= Franck Fischbach =

History of German Philosophy scholar, writer, and translator

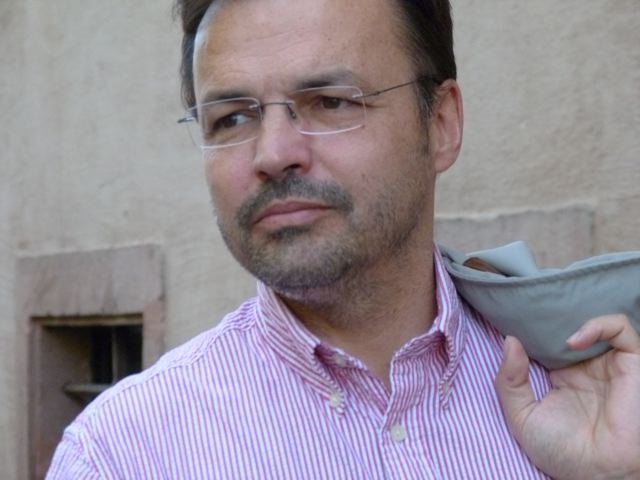
- Fischbach in 2014
- Born: 3 June 1967 (age 59); Annecy, Auvergne-Rhone-Alpes, France
- Parent(s): Fred Fischbach; Yvette Lemat
- Awards: 2019 PhiloMonaco Essay Prize

Academic background
- Education: Paris 1 Pantheon-Sorbonne University (PhD)
- Thesis: The philosophical beginning according to Hegel and Schelling (1996)
- Doctoral advisor: Bernard Bourgeois

Academic work
- Era: Contemporary philosophy
- Institutions: Paris 1 Panthéon-Sorbonne University

Franck Fischbach (born 3 June 1967) is a French philosopher and professor of German philosophy at the Panthéon-Sorbonne University (Paris 1). He is affiliated with the Centre for the History of Modern Philosophies at the Sorbonne and is a senior member of the Institut Universitaire de France (Class of 2025). He is recognized for his work in the fields of the history of German philosophy and social philosophy.

== Family and early life ==
His father was Fred Fischbach (1924–1993), an Alsatian who resisted forced conscription into the Wehrmacht in 1942, a volunteer fighter in the lsace-Lorraine Independent Brigade, a long-time member of the French Communist Party, a senior lecturer in German studies at the University of Lille 3, and a specialist on Bertolt Brecht, and Hanns Eisler.

His mother was Yvette Lemat (1931–2025), a French-Swiss native of the Canton of Vaud, a German teacher, and an honorary deputy headmistress of the Lycée Condorcet (Paris). Franck Fischbach completed his secondary education at that lycée, as well as two years of preparatory classes (including the khâgne in the philosophy class of Jean-Pierre Osier, a student of Louis Althusser and translator of Ludwig Feuerbach and Thomas Hodgskin.

== Later education ==
He studied at the École normale supérieure lettres et sciences humaines (promotion 1987), then achieved agregation in philosophy in 1991. He earned his doctorate from Paris 1 Pantheon-Sorbonne University in 1996. His doctoral thesis was supervised by Bernard Bourgeois and focused on Hegel and Schelling.

He completed a habilitation to direct research in philosophy in 2002. The habilitation was sponsored by Jean-François Kervégan, also at Paris 1, and investigated the formation of the modern ontology of activity spanning Fichte to Marx. It was titled L'Être et l'Acte.

== Career ==
Fischbach is a professor of the history of modern German philosophy at Paris 1 Panthéon-Sorbonne University since 2021. He previously taught at the University of Poitiers, Rouen, Le Mirail (from 2003) and then at the Université Nice-Sophia-Antipolis. From 2014-2018, he was director of the faculty of philosophy at the University of Strasbourg. From 2019-2023, he presided over the section 17 (Philosophy) in the Conseil national des universités (CNU).

He coedits, with Sandra Laugier the collection "Problèmes & Controverses" at the Librairie philosophique J. Vrin (Paris) and, with Sylvia Giocanti, the collection "La philosophie à l'œuvre" at Éditions de la Sorbonne (Paris). His book Faire ensemble. Reconstruction sociale et sortie du capitalisme (Le Seuil, 2024) won the essay prize from Les Rencontres Philosophiques de Monaco in 2025.

== Research ==
Fischbach’s work encompasses two fields: first, the history of modern and contemporary German philosophy (ranging from Fichte to Heidegger and the Frankfurt School’s Critical Theory, including Hegel, the Young Hegelians, and Marx; (Note: See his book: Philosophies de Marx, Vrin: 2015. The referenced article by Jérôme Skalski talks about the anthology of translations of the Young Hegelians (Gallimard, 2023) which he edited and also refers to his book Science de la logique.) and second, social philosophy (Note: See his works: Manifeste pour une philosophie sociale, La Découverte, 2009; Le sens du social, Lux Éditeur: 2015; and Faire ensemble, Le Seuil: 2024. The referenced article from Libération talks about his translations of Hegel, Schelling, Marx, and Honneth. Maggiori, the writer, also talks about Fischbach's book Le sens du social (Lux, 2015) and what's needed toward a new sense of social life in a free democratic society.) He has helped develop this latter field in France by defining it as a critical approach to social forms of life, one informed by insights from the social sciences and capable of addressing issues such as alienation or recognition. (Note: The article by Louis Pinto talks about his book La Privation de monde where he attempts to combine Heidegger and Marx into a theory of labor based on how it shapes the social sense of the individual and how its disintegration into overemphasis on production leads to world deprivation.) It is within this theoretical framework that Fischbach has philosophically addressed the question of labor. He has proposed understanding labor as an activity that cannot be reduced merely to production (poiésis) but is instead characterized by a significant practical (or "praxic") dimension, evidenced by the stakes of self-realization or collective liberation pursued by those involved in the work process. If social labor consists of a set of activities through which a society regulates its interactions with nature and ensures its own reproduction, (Note: See his works: La production des hommes, 2005, 2nd ed. 2014 Après la production. Travail, nature et capital, 2019. The referenced article from Pierre Chaillan goes into Fischbach's book Faire ensemble (the title meaning "working together").) then the subjection of labor activities to the productivist imperative of accumulation under capitalist social relations leads to a crisis of social reproduction, a crisis that, according to Fischbach, constitutes a significant dimension of contemporary ecological crises. (Note: Pour la Théorie critique. Raison, nature et société, Vrin: 2024. Again, the referenced article talks about Faire ensemble: Reconstruction sociale et sortie du capitalisme. Like his other books, it discusses the social disintegration and overproduction, but here is the theory to reconstruction after capitalism and to address the ecological crisis.)

== Published works ==
=== Books ===
- Du commencement en philosophie. Étude sur Hegel et Schelling, Paris: Librairie philosophique J. Vrin, 1999. ISBN 9782711613908
- La reconnaissance. Fichte et Hegel, Paris: PUF, 1999. ISBN 9782130497622
- Fichte. Fondement du droit naturel, Paris: Ellipses, 2000.
- L'être et l'acte. Enquête sur les fondements de l'ontologie moderne de l'agir, Paris: Librairie philosophique J. Vrin, 2002. ISBN 9782711615810
- La production des hommes. Marx avec Spinoza, Paris: PUF, 2005.
  - 2nd edition revue & complete, Paris: Librairie philosophique J. Vrin, 2014. ISBN 9782711625390
- Marx with Spinoza. Production, Alienation, History, translated by Jason Read, Edinburgh University Press, 2023
- La producción de los hombres. Marx con Spinoza, translation by Julien Canavera, Prensas de la University of Zaragoza, 2023.
- Sans objet. Capitalisme, subjectivité, aliénation, Paris: Librairie philosophique J. Vrin, 2009. ISBN 9782711622016
  - 2nd edition in 2012
  - 3rd edition en 2016.
- Brez predmeta. Kapitalizem, subjektivnost, odtujitev, translation by Aljosa Kravanja, Ljubljana, Zalozba Krtina, 2012.
- Marx. Relire Le Capital, Paris, PUF, coll. "Débats philosophiques", 2009 ; Marx. Releer El Capital.
  - Translated by Francisco López Martín, Madrid: Ediciones Akal, 2012.
- Manifeste pour une philosophie sociale, Paris: La Découverte, 2009. ISBN 9782707158482
  - Manifest fur eine Sozialphilosophie, Transcript Verlag: 2016. Translated by L. Peter, with an afterword by Th. Bedorf and K. Röttgers, Bielefeld.
  - Manifest pentru o filosofie socialâ, translated by Andreea Ratiu, Budapest, Idea Editurā, "Praxi", 2024.
- La privation de monde. Temps, espace et capital, Paris: Librairie philosophique J. Vrin, 2011. ISBN 9782711623884
- La critique sociale au cinéma, Paris: Librairie philosophique J. Vrin, 2012. ISBN 9782711624447
  - Translated in Persian by Kianoush Akhbari, chez Lega Press, Téhéran, 2023).
- Histoires et définitions de la philosophie sociale, work coedited by Eric Dufour and Emmanuel Renault, Paris: Librairie philosophique J. Vrin, 2013.
- Philosophies de Marx, Paris: Librairie philosophique J. Vrin, 2015. ISBN 9782711625628
- Le sens du social. Les puissances de la coopération, Montréal, Lux Éditeur, 2015. ISBN 9782895962021
- Qu'est-ce qu'un gouvernement socialiste? Ce qui est vivant et ce qui est mort dans le socialisme, Montréal, Lux Éditeur, 2017. ISBN 9782895962557
  - Kaj je socialistična vlada ? Kar je zivo in kar je mrtvo v socializmu, translated by Aljosa Kravanja, Ljubljana, Zalozba Krtina, 2019.
- Après la production. Travail, nature et capital, Paris: Librairie philosophique J. Vrin, 2019. ISBN 9782711628889
- Histoire philosophique du travail (in collaboration with Anne Merkel, Pierre-Marie Morel and Emmanuel Renault, Paris: Librairie philosophique J. Vrin, 2022.
- Philosophie du travail. Activité, technicité, normativité (with Emmanuel Renault, Paris: Librairie philosophique J. Vrin 2022.
- Pour la Théorie critique. Raison, nature et société, Paris: Librairie philosophique J. Vrin, 2024.
- Faire ensemble. Reconstruction sociale et sortie du capitalisme, Paris: Le Seuil, 2024.

=== Translations ===
- Georg Wilhelm Friedrich Hegel, L'esprit du christianisme et son destin, Paris: Agora, 1992.
- Friedrich Wilhelm Joseph von Schelling, Introduction à l'Esquisse d'un système de philosophie de la nature, with Emmanuel Renault, Paris: Le Livre de Poche, 2000.
- Karl Marx, Manuscrits économico-philosophiques de 1844, Paris: Librairie philosophique J. Vrin, 2007.
- Axel Honneth, Les pathologies de la liberté. Une réactualisation de la philosophie du droit de Hegel, Paris: La Découverte, 2008.
- Anthology. Selected translations from German to French, including Marx, Mikhaïl Bakounine, Bruno Bauer, Edgar Bauer, Ludwig Feuerbach, Moses Hess, Karl Friedrich Köppen, Arnold Ruge, and Max Stirner: Les Jeunes Hégéliens : politique, religion, philosophie. Une anthologie, Paris: Gallimard, coll. "NRF, Bibliothèque de Philosophie", 384 p., 2022. ISBN 9782072895241
