= Célestin Bouglé =

French philosopher (1870–1940)

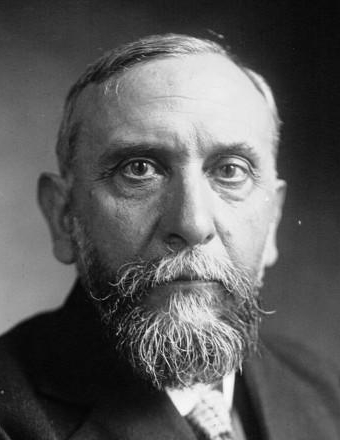
- Born: Célestin Charles Alfred Bouglé; 1 June 1870; Saint-Brieuc, Côtes-du-Nord, France
- Died: 25 January 1940 (aged 69); Paris, France
- Education: École Normale Supérieure
- Scientific career
- Fields: Philosophy, sociology, anthropology, Indology
- Workplaces: University of Paris

Célestin Charles Alfred Bouglé (1 June 1870 – 25 January 1940) was a French philosopher and sociologist known for his role as one of Émile Durkheim's collaborators and a member of the L'Année Sociologique.

== Life ==
Bouglé was born in Saint-Brieuc, Côtes-du-Nord. He entered the École Normale Supérieure in 1890 and aggregated in philosophy in 1893. He was, along with Xavier Léon, Élie Halévy, Léon Brunschvicg and Dominique Parodi, one of the founding members of the journal Revue de Métaphysique et de Morale. In 1896 he joined with Durkheim and became one of the first editors of the Année Sociologique. He received his doctorate in 1899 and became a professor of the history of social economy. Sometimes referred to as "the ambivalent Durkheimian", he is considered to be the most original and autonomous among the Durkheimians.

After teaching in Saint-Brieuc, Montpellier, and Toulouse he took a position at the Sorbonne in 1908, the same year that Essay on the Caste System appeared. In 1922, Bouglé published The Evolution of Values, which is sometimes considered to be his magnum opus. He was the vice-president of Human Rights League (France) from 1911 to 1924 and played an important role in the organization's establishment in 1898. He founded and directed the first sociology research center in France, Centre de documentation sociale (1920–1940). He became the director of the École normale supérieure (Paris) in 1935 until 1940. He died in Paris in 1940.

== Influence ==
Bouglé was one of French anthropologist Louis Dumont's foremost inspirations when it came to seeing Indian castes (in the spirit of the Année Sociologique) not just as elements making up a whole, but forming an ideological system (that of the Varnas, not the numerous Jatis) that in meaning and scope surpasses the sum of the elements.

== Works ==
- Essais sur le régime des castes in 1908 (Essays on the caste system; published in English as "Essays on the Caste System by Celestin Bougle" with a translation by D. F. Pocock in 1971 by Cambridge University Press).
- Leçons de sociologie sur l’évolution des valeurs in 1922 (Sociological lessons on the evolution of values; published in English as The Evolution of Values: Studies in Sociology with Special Applications to Teaching in 1926 by Henry Holt and Company).
- Socialismes français. Du « socialisme utopique » à la « démocratie industrielle » in 1932; (published in English as French Socialisms: From 'Utopian Socialism' to 'Industrial Democracy' in 2024 by little big eye publishing.)
