= Gwendoline Jarczyk =

French philosopher (1927–2021)

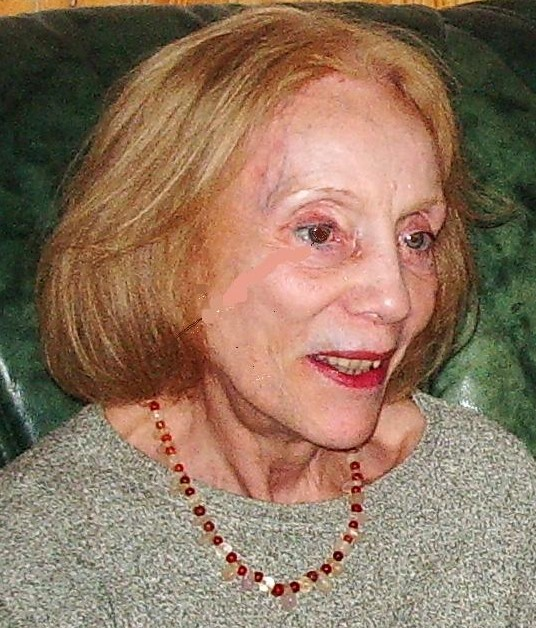
- Born: 23 August 1927; Katowice, Second Polish Republic
- Died: 18 November 2021 (aged 94); Paris, France

Philosophical work
- Era: Contemporary philosophy
- Region: Western philosophy
- School: Continental

Gwendoline Jarczyk (23 August 1927 – 18 November 2021) was a French philosopher, historian of philosophy and translator, specialising in Hegel and Master Eckhart.

== Biography ==
Gwendoline Jarczyk was born in Katowice, Poland, in 1927 to a Polish father, a doctor, and a French mother from Normandy. She left Poland in 1939 shortly before the outbreak of war.

Since then, she has lived in Paris and devoted herself to research and publications in philosophy and mysticism, focusing mainly on two authors of whom she was a specialist: Meister Eckhart, a theologian of Rhenish mysticism from the thirteenth and fourteenth centuries, and Hegel, a German philosopher from the eighteenth and nineteenth centuries.

== Work ==
In the 1970s, G. Jarczyk prepared a doctorate in philosophy under the supervision of Paul Ricœur and defended her thesis Système et liberté dans la logique de Hegel (System and Freedom in Hegel's logic) in 1979 at the Paris Nanterre University.

She contributed to the Christian newspapers La Croix and France Catholique Ecclesia and publishes in the Jesuit journals Christus and Études.

With Pierre-Jean Labarrière, a Jesuit, she has co-translated and commented on works by Hegel and Master Eckhart (see bibliography).

She has conducted several interviews with theologians from different religions. She spoke with Karl Rahner in 1983, when he came to the Centre Sèvres. In 1997 she published her interfaith talks with Raimon Panikkar, an Indo-Spanish theologian, on the themes of the Divine, Man and the Cosmos.

She has also taken an interest in the work of the Vietnamese Marxist philosopher Tran Duc Thao, whose correspondence with Alexandre Kojève she published with Labarrière, the author of the lessons on Hegel that became famous in France in the 1930s.

In 2013, Jarczyk published L'Abîmement instaurateur dans la Logique de Hegel.

== Works ==
Publications

- La Liberté religieuse. 20 ans après le Concile, Paris, Desclée de Brouwer, 1984, 161 p.
- Éloge des libertés, Paris, Desclée de Brouwer, 1992, 132 p., ISBN 9782220031033.
- Science de la logique. Hegel, Paris, Ellipses, 1998, 64 p., ISBN 9782729867997.
- Le Négatif ou l'écriture de l'autre dans la logique de Hegel, Paris, Ellipses, 1999, 624 p., ISBN 9782729849627, postface de Pierre-Jean Labarrière.
- Le Mal défiguré. Étude sur la pensée de Hegel, Paris, Ellipses, 2000, 288 p., ISBN 9782729804862.
- Système et liberté dans la logique de Hegel, Paris, Kimé, 2001, 333 p., ISBN 9782841742509.
- Au confluent de la mort. L'universel et le singulier dans la philosophie de Hegel, Paris, Ellipses, 2002, 256 p., ISBN 9782729813383, postface de Pierre-Jean Labarrière.
- La Réflexion spéculative. Le retour et la perte dans la pensée de Hegel, Paris, Kimé, 2004, 345 p., ISBN 9782841743339, postface de Pierre-Jean Labarrière.
- Le Concept dans son ambiguïté. La manifestation du sensible chez Hegel, Paris, Kimé, 2006, 308 p., ISBN 9782841743858, postface de Pierre-Jean Labarrière.
- La Liberté ou l'être en négation. Rapport et unité relationnelle dans la logique de Hegel, Paris, Kimé, 2010, 403 p., ISBN 9782841745081.
- L'Abîmement instaurateur dans la Logique de Hegel, Paris, Kimé, 2013, 233 p., ISBN 9782841746378.

Works in collaboration with Pierre-Jean Labarrière

- Hegeliana, Paris, Presses Universitaires de France, 1986, collection « Philosophie d'aujourd'hui », 368 p., ISBN 978-2130396659.
- Le Syllogisme du pouvoir. Y a-t-il une démocratie hégélienne ? , Paris, Aubier, 1992, Collection « Bibliothèque philosophique », 362 p., ISBN 9782700734720.
- Maître Eckhart ou l'empreinte du désert, Paris, Albin Michel, 1995, Collection « Spiritualités vivantes », 262 p. ISBN 978-2226079190,. Format Kindle, 2013, ASIN B00GWMCXIW.
- De Kojève à Hegel. 150 ans de pensée hégélienne en France, Paris, Albin Michel, 1996, 272 p., ISBN 9782226078667.
- Le Vocabulaire de Maître Eckhart, Paris, Ellipses, 2001, Collection « Vocabulaire de », 64 p. ISBN 978-2729804589. Réédition 2016,ISBN 978-2340010819.
- « L'anneau immobile ». Regards croisés sur Maître Eckhart, avec Benoît Vermander et S. Bongiovanni, Éditions Facultés jésuites de Paris, 2005, 135 p., ISBN 9782848470054.

Interviews

- Dom Angelico Surchamp (1993). L'art roman, rencontre entre Dieu et les hommes (in French). Paris: Desclée de Brouwer. p. 208. ISBN 2-220-03405-4..
- Godfried Danneels, L'humanité de Dieu. Entretiens avec Gwendoline Jarczyk, Paris, Desclée de Brouwer, 1994, 217 p., ISBN 2220035603.
- Claude Geffré, Profession théologien. Quelle pensée chrétienne pour le XXIe siècle ?, Paris, Albin Michel, 1999, 316 p., ISBN 9782226109835.
- Mohammed Talbi, Penseur libre en Islam, Paris, Albin Michel, 2002, 421 p., ISBN 9782226132048.
- Salah Stétié, Fils de la Parole. Un poète d'Islam en Occident, Paris, Albin Michel, 2004, 259 p., ISBN 9782226151926.
- Daniel Farhi, Profession rabbin. De la communauté à l'universel, Paris, Albin Michel, 2006, 263 p., ISBN 9782226149213.
- Karl Rahner (2011). Traité fondamental de la foi. Œuvres de Karl Rahner (in French). Paris: Cerf. p. 592. ISBN 978-2-204-09285-2..
- Raimon Panikkar, Entre Dieu et le cosmos. Une vision non dualiste de la réalité, Paris, Albin Michel, 2012, coll. « Spiritualités vivantes », 274 p., ISBN 9782226239259.

Translations

- Karol Wojtyla, Personne et acte, trad. fr. Gwendolyne Jarczyk, annotations Aude Suramy, Paris, Parole et Silence (coll. Collège des Bernardins, n° 11), 2011, XXXIV-358 p.

Translations with Pierre-Jean Labarrière

- Georg Wilhelm Friedrich Hegel, Phénoménologie de l'esprit, Paris, Gallimard, 1993, 928., ISBN 9782070728817.
- Georg Wilhelm Friedrich Hegel, Science de la logique. Premier tome : la logique objective (premier livre : la doctrine de l'être, version de 1832), Paris, Kimé, 2007, 622 p., ISBN 9782841744343.
- Maître Eckhart, Les Sermons, Paris, Albin Michel, 2009, 792 p., ISBN 9782226191021.
- Maître Eckhart, Les Traités et le Poème, Paris, Albin Michel, 2011, 230 p., ISBN 9782226220486.
- Georg Wilhelm Friedrich Hegel, Science de la logique. Second tome : la logique subjective (la doctrine du concept), Paris, Kimé, 2014, 420 p., ISBN 9782841746835.

Articles

- « Totalité et mouvement chez Hegel », Laval théologique et philosophique, Vol. 37, 1981, No. 3, p. 317-322. Lire en ligne.
- « Logic behind Consciousness », Revue Internationale de Philosophie, No. 240, 2007/2, p. 121-137. Lire en ligne.
