= Société française de philosophie =

Learned society

The Société française de philosophie or the French Society of Philosophy is a Paris-based learned society founded in 1901 by Xavier Léon and André Lalande. Over the years, it has welcomed some of the well-known representatives of science and philosophy from France and abroad, and aims to serve universal thought.

== Description ==
The Society presents itself as having the purpose of “bringing philosophical works together by creating a center for communication and information, working to bring scholars and philosophers closer together, instituting discussions to clarify the meaning and position of various problems, criticizing and determining philosophical language, dealing with questions relating to teaching, preparing the organization of congresses.”It organizes international congresses, colloquia and conferences, publishes a Bulletin and owns the Revue de métaphysique et de morale. It has around 350 members.The society has worked on the Vocabulaire technique et critique de la philosophie, edited by André Lalande.

== History ==
Bernard Bourgeois sees the founding of the Société française de philosophie as the culmination of a “social institution of philosophy” movement in the 19th century, following a “institution philosophique de la société” with the French Revolution of 1789. The Society was thus part of a philosophical institution that emerged in the wake of the Lumières and Ideological movements that had begun to unite various philosophers in France. The milieu of philosophical thought was brought together in a single community, a “spiritual home for all those who claim to be guided by reason” (Xavier Léon).

The society effectively reconciles two opposing trends in philosophy: the spiritualism of Cousinian reason and the positivism of Comtian reason. More generally, it works to bring scholars and philosophers closer together. It must provide a link for the various representatives of contemporary philosophy, whatever the diversity of their opinions. In practice, however, the synthesis was limited in that it excluded materialism and dialectical thinking, for example, until 1939.

The Dictionary's function was to universalize the language of philosophy: it was to be a joint effort, but objections from some members, such as Bergson and Brunschvicg, to the fixation of concepts in philosophy led André Lalande to direct this activity alone. He wrote the Dictionary between 1902 and 1922, occasionally calling on foreign members such as Bertrand Russell and Edmund Husserl.

As a result, the Society's main activity consists of conferences followed by debates, where the aim is not so much to present theses as to discuss them with other members. We are here,“ says Alphonse Darlu, ”to mark our dissents". Members belong to a closed society of scholars. At first, their number does not exceed sixty. They are mainly members of the Institut de France, the Collège de France or university professors. In this sense, “aristocratic” takes precedence over “democratic” functioning.

The Society's rules forbade religious discussions, but there were nonetheless some lively debates between speakers on related issues, such as the “querelle de l'athéisme” between Gabriel Marcel and Léon Brunschvicg in 1928. On this occasion, Xavier Léon recalled that the Society's principle is to allow the expression of beliefs “in complete freedom” and without fear of offending other members, but in a spirit of “complete and mutual tolerance”.

After the 1914-1918 war, the Society declared its support for “the great work of the League of Nations”. It invited thinkers from America such as Albert Einstein and John Dewey. German thought between the wars was represented by Edmund Husserl and Ernst Cassirer. In 1936, Brunschvicg spoke of the dangers to peace and freedom posed by communism, fascism and Nazism. On June 17, 1939, Raymond Aron delivered a lecture on “Democratic States and Totalitarian States”.

The Société quickly developed into an internationally recognized place of republican philosophy, where different views could be presented discursively. This early period included discussions about Georg Wilhelm Friedrich Hegel and Auguste Comte, discussions with sociologists about Émile Durkheim and, in 1922, a discussion with Albert Einstein, Paul Langevin, Henri Bergson, Edouard LeRoy and Émile Meyerson about the theory of relativity.

Once a quarter, the society invites a selected academic to give a lecture at the Sorbonne. Well-known lectures that have resulted from this include Jean-Paul Sartre's Consciousness and Self-Knowledge, Louis Althusser's Lenin and Philosophy, Michel Foucault's lectures What is an Author? and What is Critique? or Jacques Derrida's The Différance.

== Guest speakers ==
Guest speakers include Henri Bergson, Edmund Husserl, Albert Einstein, Henri Poincaré, Gustave Belot, Paul Langevin, Jean Perrin, Bertrand Russell, Louis de Broglie, Georg Lukács, Jean-Paul Sartre, Georges Sorel, Raymond Aron, Claude Lévi-Strauss, Michel Foucault, Jacques Lacan, Jacques Derrida.

== Presidents ==
- 1901-1935 : Xavier Léon
- 1936-? : Léon Brunschvicg
- 1946 : Gaston Berger
- 1946-1974 : Jean Wahl

[...]

- 1981-1991 : Jacques D'Hondt
- 1991-2010 : Bernard Bourgeois
- 2010-2019 : Didier Deleule
- Since 2019 : Denis Kambouchner. Vice-president : Laurent Jaffro

== Notes and references ==
=== Bibliography ===
- (de) François Beilecke, Französische Intellektuelle und die Dritte Republik: das Beispiel einer Intellektuellenassoziation 1892–1939, Campus Verlag, 2003 ISBN 3593372703, p. 154–155.
- Bernard Bourgeois, Centenaire de la Société française de philosophie, 15/12/2001, "Jeunesse d'une société (1901-1939)", p. 9, Bulletin de la Société française de philosophie, Paris, Vrin, 2001, 95e année, téléchargeable sur le site de la Société française de philosophie
- Stéphan Soulié, Les philosophes en République. L'aventure intellectuelle de la Revue de métaphysique et de morale et de la Société française de philosophie (1891-1914), Rennes : Presses Universitaires de Rennes, 2009.

== See also ==
- Deutsche Gesellschaft für Philosophie
- Revue de métaphysique et de morale
- Xavier Léon
- André Lalande
- Bernard Bourgeois
- Association loi de 1901
