= Author =

Creator of an original work

In legal discourse, an author is the creator of an original work that has been published, whether that work exists in written, graphic, visual, or recorded form. The act of creating such a work is called authorship, which means a sculptor, painter, or composer is considered the author of their respective sculptures, paintings, or musical compositions. Although in common usage, the term "author" is often associated specifically with the writer of a book, article, play, or other written work. In cases involving a work for hire, the employer or commissioning party is legally considered the author of the work, even if it was created by someone else.

Typically, the first owner of a copyright is the creator of the copyrighted work, i.e., the author. If more than one person created the work, then joint authorship has taken place. Copyright law differs around the world. The United States Copyright Office, for example, defines copyright as "a form of protection provided by the laws of the United States (title 17, U.S. Code) to authors of 'original works of authorship.'"

Some works are considered to be author-less, or are anonymously or secretly authored. The monkey selfie copyright dispute in the 2010s was a notable dispute of authorship involving photographs taken by Celebes crested macaques using equipment belonging to a nature photographer. The photographer asserted authorship of the photographs, which the United States Copyright Office denied, stating: "To qualify as a work of 'authorship' a work must be created by a human being." The development of generative AI has led to discourse regarding authorship of the media it generates.

== Legal significance of authorship ==
Holding the title of "author" over any "literary, dramatic, musical, artistic, [or] certain other intellectual works" gives rights to this person, the owner of the copyright, especially the exclusive right to engage in or authorize any production or distribution of their work. Any person or entity wishing to use intellectual property held under copyright must receive permission from the copyright holder to use this work, and often will be asked to pay for the use of copyrighted material.

The copyrights on intellectual work expire after a certain time. It enters the public domain, where it can be used without limit. Copyright laws in many jurisdictions – mostly following the lead of the United States, in which the entertainment and publishing industries have very strong lobbying power – have been amended repeatedly since their inception, to extend the length of this fixed period where the work is exclusively controlled by the copyright holder. Technically, someone owns their work from the time it's created. A notable aspect of authorship emerges with copyright in that, in many jurisdictions, it can be passed down to another, upon one's death. The person who inherits the copyright is not the author, but has access to the same legal benefits.

Intellectual property laws are complex. Works of fiction involve trademark law, likeness rights, fair use rights held by the public (including the right to parody or satirize), and many other interacting complications.

Authors may portion out the different rights that they hold to different parties at different times, and for different purposes or uses, such as the right to adapt a plot into a film, television series, or video game. If another party chooses to adapt the work, they may have to alter plot elements or character names in order to avoid infringing previous adaptations. An author may also not have rights when working under contract that they would otherwise have, such as when creating a work for hire (e.g., hired to write a city tour guide by a municipal government that totally owns the copyright to the finished work), or when writing material using intellectual property owned by others (such as when writing a novel or screenplay that is a new installment in an already established media franchise).

In the United States, the Copyright Clause of the Constitution of the United States (Article I, Section 8, Clause 8) provides Congress with the power of "securing for limited Times to Authors and Inventors the exclusive Right to their respective Writings and Discoveries". The language regarding authors was derived from proposals by Charles Pinckney, "to secure to authors exclusive rights for a limited time", and by James Madison, "to secure to literary authors their copyrights for a limited time", or, in the alternative, "to encourage, by proper premiums & Provisions, the advancement of useful knowledge and discoveries". Both proposals were referred to the Committee of Detail, which reported back a proposal containing the final language, which was incorporated into the Constitution by unanimous agreement of the convention.

== Philosophical views of the nature of authorship ==
The Statute of Anne in 1710 set a legal precedent which laid the foundations of copyright, further establishing an author as the sole creator of a literary work. While this legislation acknowledged that an author's words were their Intellectual property, it in no way protected that author's ideas. For example, one writer could legally copy another writer's plot exactly, as long as the words were not copied verbatim. In other words, the Statue of Anne protected an author's form of expression but not the thoughts behind their words.

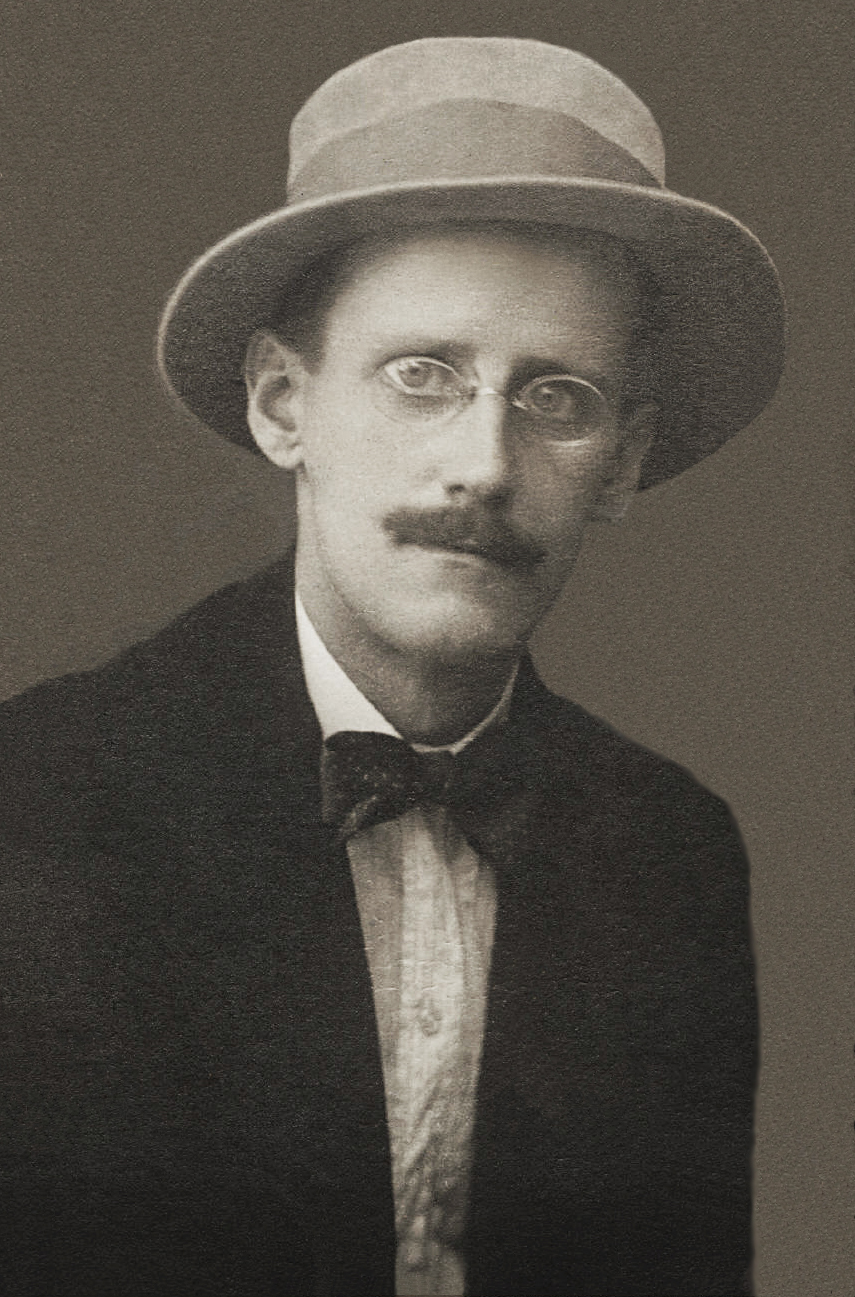
James Joyce was a prominent Irish novelist, poet and literary critic during the 20th century.

In literary theory, critics find complications in the term author beyond what constitutes authorship in a legal setting. In the wake of postmodern literature, critics such as Roland Barthes and Michel Foucault have examined the role and relevance of authorship to the meaning or interpretation of a literary text.

Barthes challenges the idea that a text can be attributed to any single author. He writes, in his essay "Death of the Author" (1968), that "it is language which speaks, not the author." The words and language of a text itself determine and expose meaning for Barthes, and not someone possessing legal responsibility for the process of its production. Every line of written text is a mere reflection of references from any of a multitude of traditions, or, as Barthes states, "the text is a tissue of quotations drawn from the innumerable centers of culture"; it is never original. With this, the perspective of the author is removed from the text, and the limits formerly imposed by the idea of one authorial voice, one ultimate and universal meaning, are destroyed. The explanation and meaning of a work does not have to be sought in the one who produced it, "as if it were always in the end, through the more or less transparent allegory of the fiction, the voice of a single person, the author 'confiding' in us". The psyche, culture, fanaticism of an author can be disregarded when interpreting a text, because the words are rich enough themselves with all of the traditions of language. To expose meanings in a written work without appealing to the celebrity of an author, their tastes, passions, vices, is, to Barthes, to allow language to speak, rather than author.

Michel Foucault argues in his essay "What is an author?" (1969) that all authors are writers, but not all writers are authors. He states that "a private letter may have a signatory—it does not have an author." For a reader to assign the title of author upon any written work is to attribute certain standards upon the text which, for Foucault, are working in conjunction with the idea of "the author function". Foucault's author function is the idea that an author exists only as a function of a written work, a part of its structure, but not necessarily part of the interpretive process. The author's name "indicates the status of the discourse within a society and culture," and at one time was used as an anchor for interpreting a text, a practice which Barthes would argue is not a particularly relevant or valid endeavor.

Expanding upon Foucault's position, Alexander Nehamas writes that Foucault suggests "an author [...] is whoever can be understood to have produced a particular text as we interpret it," not necessarily who penned the text. It is this distinction between producing a written work and producing the interpretation or meaning in a written work that both Barthes and Foucault are interested in. Foucault warns of the risks of keeping the author's name in mind during interpretation, because it could affect the value and meaning with which one handles an interpretation.

Barthes and Foucault suggest that readers should not rely on or look for the notion of one overarching voice when interpreting a written work, because of the complications inherent with a writer's title of "author". They warn of the dangers interpretations could suffer from when associating the subject of inherently meaningful words and language with the personality of one authorial voice. Instead, readers should allow a text to be interpreted in terms of the language as "author".

== Relationship with publisher ==
=== Self-publishing ===
Self-publishing is when authors act as the publisher of their own books and take full responsibility and control of the costs. Those costs include editing, printing, and distributing their own works.

=== Traditional publishing ===
With commissioned publishing, the publisher makes all the publication arrangements and the author covers all expenses.

Authors may be compensated through a percentage of a book's wholesale or specific price, or by receiving a fixed amount per copy sold. To minimize risk, publishers sometimes defer such payments until a certain number of copies have been sold. In Canada, this approach appeared in the 1890s but did not become widespread until the 1920s. Established authors may be offered advance payments against future royalties, though this practice has become less common. Most independent publishers now pay royalties as a percentage of net receipts though how net receipts are calculated can vary by publisher. Under these agreements, the author is not responsible for any publication costs; the financial burden is borne entirely by the publisher, who typically retains the largest share of the revenue. See also Compensation.

=== Vanity publishing ===
Vanity publishers normally charge a flat fee for arranging publication, offer a platform for selling, and then take a percentage of the sale of every copy of a book. The author receives the rest of the money made. Most materials published this way are for niche groups and not for large audiences.

Vanity publishing, or subsidy publishing, is stigmatized in the professional world. In 1983, Bill Henderson defined vanity publishers as people who would "publish anything for which an author will pay, usually at a loss for the author and a nice profit for the publisher". In subsidy publishing, the book sales are not the publishers' main source of income, but instead the fees that the authors are charged to initially produce the book are. Because of this, the vanity publishers need not invest in making books marketable as much as other publishers need to. This leads to low quality books being introduced to the market.

== Relationship with editor ==
The relationship between the author and the editor, often the author's only liaison to the publishing company, is typically characterized as the site of tension. For the author to reach their audience, often through publication, the work usually must attract the attention of the editor. The idea of the author as the sole meaning-maker of necessity changes to include the influences of the editor and the publisher to engage the audience in writing as a social act.

There are three principal kinds of editing:

- Proofing (checking the grammar and spelling, looking for typographical errors),
- Story (potentially an area of deep angst for both author and publisher), and
- Layout (the typesetting needed to ready a work for publishing often requires minor text changes, so a layout editor is employed to ensure that these do not alter the sense of the text).

Pierre Bourdieu's essay "The Field of Cultural Production" depicts the publishing industry as a "space of literary or artistic position-takings," also called the "field of struggles," which is defined by the tension and movement inherent among the various positions in the field. Bourdieu claims that the "field of position-takings [...] is not the product of coherence-seeking intention or objective consensus," meaning that an industry characterized by position-takings is not one of harmony and neutrality. In particular for the writer, their authorship in their work makes their work part of their identity, and there is much at stake personally over the negotiation of authority over that identity. However, it is the editor who has "the power to impose the dominant definition of the writer and therefore to delimit the population of those entitled to take part in the struggle to define the writer". As "cultural investors," publishers rely on the editor position to identify a good investment in "cultural capital" which may grow to yield economic capital across all positions.

According to the studies of James Curran, the system of shared values among editors in Britain has generated a pressure among authors to write to fit the editors' expectations, removing the focus from the reader-audience and putting a strain on the relationship between authors and editors and on writing as a social act. Even the book review by the editors has more significance than the readership's reception.

== Compensation ==
Authors rely on advance fees, royalty payments, adaptation of work to a screenplay, and fees collected from giving speeches.

A standard contract for an author will usually include provision for payment in the form of an advance and royalties.

- Advance: a lump sum paid before publication. An advance must be earned out before royalties are payable. It may be paid in two lump sums: the first payment on contract signing, and the second on delivery of the completed manuscript or on publication.
- Royalty payment: the sum paid to authors for each copy of a book sold and is traditionally around 10–12%, but self-published authors can earn about 40% – 60% royalties per each book sale. An author's contract may specify, for example, that they will earn 10% of the retail price of each book sold. Some contracts specify a scale of royalties payable (for example, where royalties start at 10% for the first 10,000 sales, but then increase to a higher percentage rate at higher sale thresholds).

Usually, an author's book must earn the advance before any further royalties are paid. For example, if an author is paid a modest advance of $2000, and their royalty rate is 10% of a book priced at $20 – that is, $2 per book – the book will need to sell 1000 copies before any further payment will be made. Publishers typically withhold payment of a percentage of royalties earned against returns.

In some countries, authors also earn income from a government scheme such as the ELR (educational lending right) and PLR (public lending right) schemes in Australia. Under these schemes, authors are paid a fee for the number of copies of their books in educational and/or public libraries.

Many authors today supplement their income from book sales with public speaking engagements, school visits, residencies, grants, and teaching positions.

Ghostwriters, technical writers, and textbooks writers are typically paid in a different way: usually a set fee or a per-word rate rather than on a percentage of sales.

In the year 2016, according to the U.S. Bureau of Labor Statistics, nearly 130,000 people worked in the country as authors, making an average of $61,240 per year.

== See also ==
- Lead author
- Academic authorship
- Authors' editor
- Writing
  - Distributive writing
  - Professional writing
  - Composition (language)
- Auteur
- Writer
- Poet
- Novelist
- Author surrogate
- Lists of writers
- List of poets
- List of novelists
