= Bernard Bourgeois =

French philosopher (1929–2024)

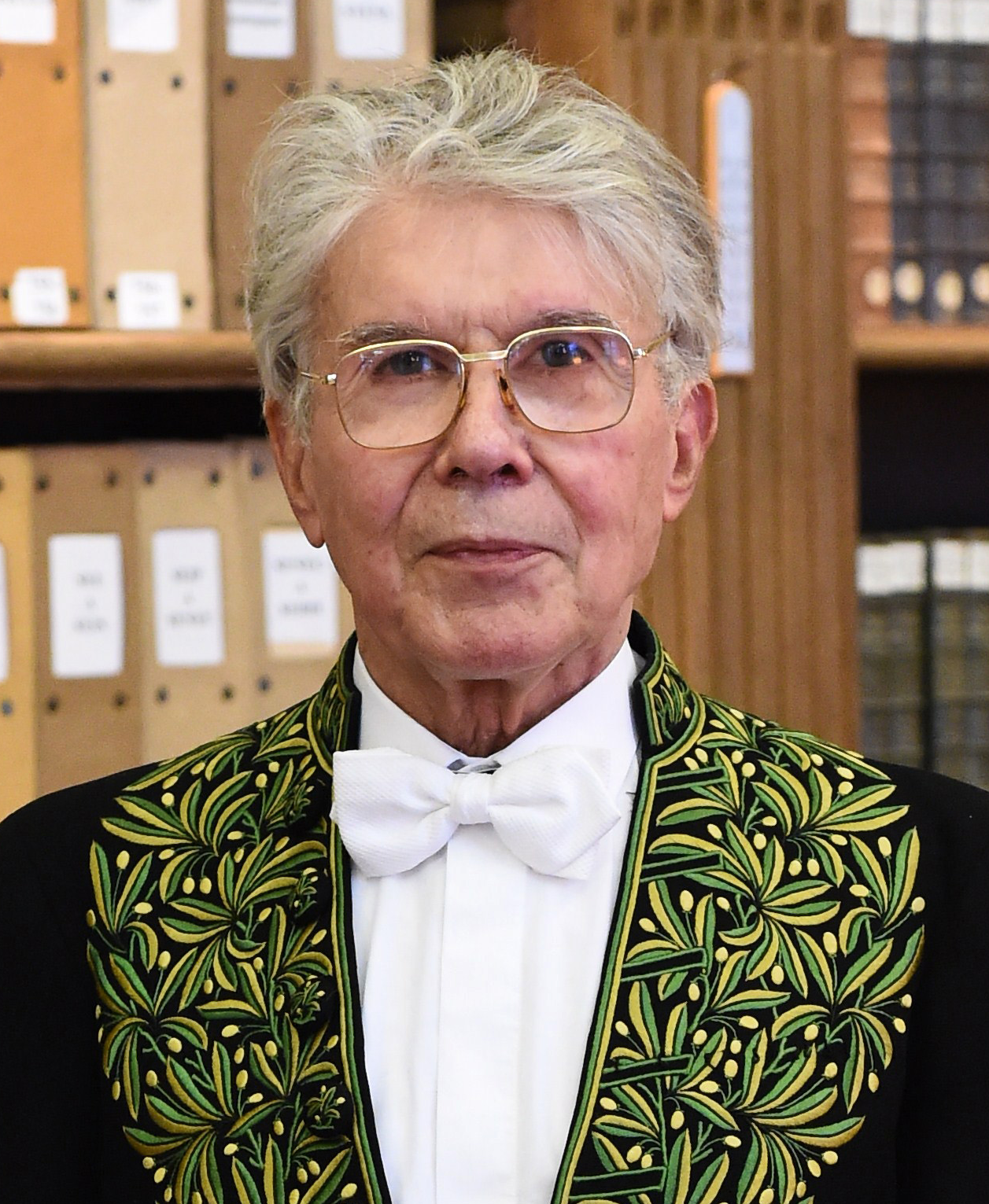
- Born: September 2, 1929; Varennes-Saint-Sauveur, France
- Died: March 26, 2024 (aged 94); Viriat, France

Education
- Education: École Normale Supérieure; Paris-Sorbonne University
- Thesis: Soutenance sur travaux hégéliens (1972)

Philosophical work
- Era: Contemporary philosophy
- Region: Western philosophy
- School: Continental
- Institutions: University of Paris I
- Doctoral students: Béatrice Longuenesse, Quentin Meillassoux, Jean-François Kervégan, Franck Fischbach
- Notable students: Joseph Cohen
- Main interests: Logic, dialectics, reason, political law, philosophy of history
- Notable ideas: Hegel as a philosopher of freedom

Bernard Bourgeois (French: [bɛʁnaʁ buʁʒwa]; September 2, 1929 – March 26, 2024) was a French philosopher. He was a member of Académie des Sciences Morales et Politiques, and he was its president in 2014. He was a specialist in the history of modern German philosophy, from Kant to Marx, and in particular Hegel, several of whose works he translated into the French language. His fields of study include logic and dialectics, reason and political law, the philosophy of history, the relationship between religion and philosophy, and pedagogy.

== Biography ==
Bernard Bourgeois graduated from the École Normale Supérieure in 1951. He received his agrégation in philosophy in 1954.

After his military service as a rifle officer in Algeria (1954–1957), he taught at the Lycée de Mâcon from 1957 to 1963. He then taught at the Faculté des Lettres et des Sciences humaines de Lyon. He obtained his doctorate from Paris-Sorbonne University in 1972, and went on to become a professor at the University of Lyon 2, then the University of Lyon-III until 1989. In March 1979, he was elected vice-president of teaching at Lyon-III, and expressed his concerns about the university's situation. In 1989, he was elected professor at the Paris 1 Panthéon-Sorbonne University.

At the same time, he assumed numerous institutional responsibilities as dean of the Faculty of Lyon, member of the Conseil national des universités, member of the French Commission for UNESCO. From 1991 to 2010 he chaired the Société française de philosophie.

He was also director of the Revue de métaphysique et de morale, and has been a member of the Board of Directors of "Fondation Ostad Elahi – éthique et solidarité humaine" since its creation in 2000.

As an emeritus professor, he was elected on December 2, 2002, to the Académie des sciences morales et politiques in the philosophy section, to Olivier Lacombe's chair. He was delegated to the Séance solennelle des Cinq Académies in 2008, and presided over the Académie in 2014.

== Bourgeois and Hegel ==
Bernard Bourgeois's work on Hegel's philosophy is situated within the problematics of twentieth-century French philosophy inaugurated by Jean Wahl and Alexandre Kojève, and continued with Jean Hyppolite. At the time, Hegel was a dominant philosophical figure around whom several philosophical currents – existentialism, phenomenology, Marxism and soon deconstruction –crystallized.

Bourgeois saw Hegelianism not as an antecedent of Marxism, but contrary to Marxism as a parenthesis of history, as the philosophy of freedom. He began a polemic against Francis Fukuyama's doctrine of the end of history, which sees liberal democracy as the end point of humanity's ideological evolution.

== Honors ==
- Chevalier de la Légion d'honneur
- Chevalier de l'ordre des Palmes académiques

== Publications ==
- L’idéalisme de Fichte, Paris, PUF, 1968 (réédition Vrin, 1985)
- La pensée politique de Hegel, Paris, PUF, 1969
- Hegel à Francfort ou Judaïsme, Christianisme, Hégélianisme, Paris, Vrin, 1970
- Le droit naturel de Hegel. Commentaire, Paris, Vrin, 1986
- Philosophie et droits de l’homme, Paris, PUF, 1990
- Éternité et historicité de l’Esprit selon Hegel, Paris, Vrin, 1991
- Études hégéliennes. Raison et décision, Paris, PUF, 1992
- La philosophie allemande classique, Paris, PUF, 1995
- Hegel, Paris, Ellipses, 1998
- Fichte, Paris, Ellipses, 2000
- Le vocabulaire de Fichte, Paris, Ellipses, 2000
- Le vocabulaire de Hegel, Paris, Ellipses, 2000
- L’idéalisme allemand : Alternatives et progrès, Paris, Vrin, 2000
- La raison moderne et le droit politique, Paris, Vrin, 2000
- Hegel. Les actes de l’Esprit, Paris, Vrin, 2001
- Les sciences morales et politiques [sous la dir. de], Paris, Hermann, 2016
- Sept questions politiques du jour, Paris, Vrin, 2017
- Penser l’histoire du présent avec Hegel, Paris, Vrin, 2017
- Sur l’histoire ou la politique, Paris, Vrin, 2018
- Pour Hegel, Paris, Vrin, 2019

=== Translations ===
- Hegel, Encyclopédie des sciences philosophiques, I : La science de la logique, Paris, Vrin, 1970
- Hegel, Des manières de traiter scientifiquement du droit naturel, Paris, Vrin, 1972
- Hegel, Textes pédagogiques, Paris, Vrin, 1978
- Hegel, Encyclopédie des sciences philosophiques, III : Philosophie de l’esprit, Paris, Vrin, 1988
- Hegel, Concepts préliminaires de l’Encyclopédie des sciences philosophiques, Paris, Vrin, 1994
- Hegel, Préface. Introduction à la Phénoménologie de l’Esprit, Paris, Vrin, 1997
- Hegel, Encyclopédie des sciences philosophiques, II : Philosophie de la Nature, Paris, Vrin, 2004
- Hegel, Phénoménologie de l'Esprit, Paris, Vrin, 2006
- Hegel, Science de la logique, I : L'Être, Paris, Vrin, 2015
- Hegel, Science de la logique, II : L'essence, Paris, Vrin, 2016
- Hegel, Science de la logique, III : Le concept, Paris, Vrin, 2016

== See also ==
- Pierre-Jean Labarrière

== Sources ==
- Deloche, Bernard (December 2018). "PERSONNAGES/Bref panorama de la philosophie lyonnaise du XXe siècle". Histoires Lyonnaises, Carnet de Recherches (in French). doi:10.58079/r405.
