= Alain Deneault =

Canadian author (born 1970)

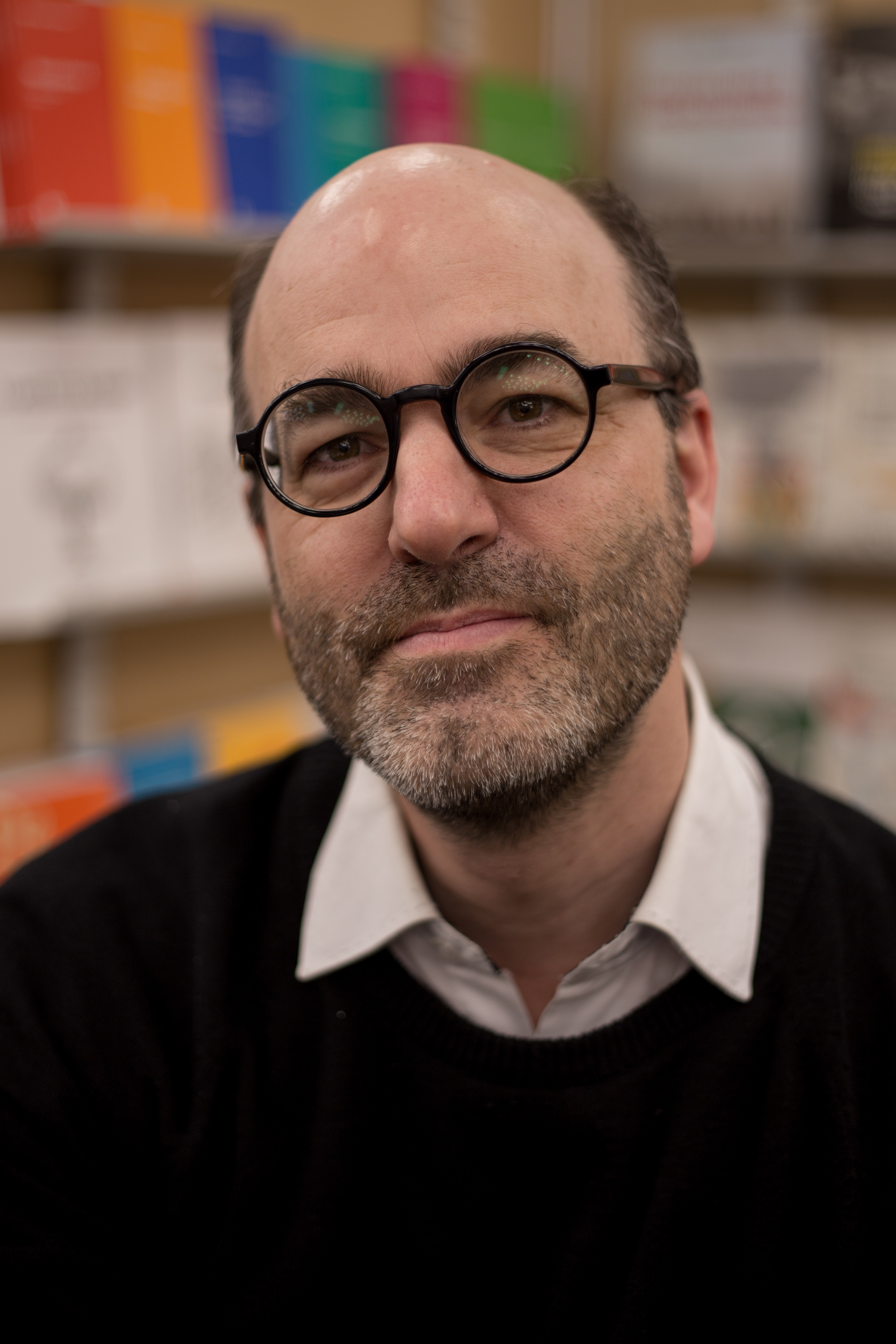
- Born: Outaouais (Quebec, Canada)
- Education: Paris 8 University (PhD)
- Website: alaindeneault.net

Alain Deneault (born 1970) is a French Canadian author from Quebec. He is known for his book Noir Canada: Pillage, corruption et criminalité en Afrique and the legal proceedings that followed its publishing.

== Biography ==
Deneault was born in Outaouais, Quebec. He has a research doctorate from Centre Marc Bloch, Berlin, and a PhD in philosophy from Paris 8 University under the supervision of Jacques Rancière. His studies focused on philosophy from nineteenth-century Germany and twentieth-century France, particularly the work of Georg Simmel. He lives in Petite-Rivière-de-l’Île, and he teaches philosophy at the campus de la Péninsule acadienne de l’Université de Moncton.

He has written several books on topics related to international finance, globalization, transnational corporations, and corporate tax havens. In 1999, Deneault was a speaker on globalization at the Millennium Round of the World Trade Organization Conference in Seattle. The book Noir Canada: Pillage, corruption et criminalité en Afrique, written by Deneault, Delphine Abadie, and William Sacher, published in 2008 by Les Éditions Écosociété Inc., concerns the activities of Canadian mining companies in Africa.

=== Lawsuits ===
Following the publication of Noir Canada, mining company Barrick Gold sent Écosociété a threatening letter regarding alleged inaccuracies in the book's description of evictions at the Bulyanhulu Gold Mine in Tanzania in 1996. The book's launch was postponed as a result, but the publisher managed to distribute 1,700 copies. Barrick filed a $6-million lawsuit against the authors and the publisher for libel.

The lawsuit has been considered by some to be a strategic lawsuit against public participation (SLAPP). On 12 August 2011 the Quebec Superior Court ruled that "Barrick seems to be trying to intimidate authors", that the suit was "seemingly abusive", and that Barrick must pay the authors and publisher $143,000 to prepare their defense. On 18 October 2011 Barrick, the authors, and the publisher reached an out-of-court settlement that included a payment to Barrick and ceasing publication of the book. Deneault told news media that the authors had agreed to the settlement in order to bring an end to the legal proceedings, so that they could "return to having our discussions back in the public sphere, instead of the courtroom".

In May 2008 a coalition of Quebec organizations formed to push for anti-SLAPP legislation. The Barrick suit against Écosociété (which joined the coalition) helped bring awareness to the cause. On 4 June 2009 Quebec adopted an anti-SLAPP bill called "An Act to amend the Code of Civil Procedure to prevent improper use of the courts and promote freedom of expression and citizen participation in public debate".

In June 2008 another mining company, Banro Corporation, sued the authors and publisher for allegedly defamatory content in Noir Canada, for $5 million. The prosecution took place in Ontario courts, despite the fact that fewer than 100 copies of the book were distributed in the province. The publisher appealed to the Supreme Court to repatriate the suit to Quebec, partly because of its newly adopted anti-SLAPP legislation, but was denied. In 2013, the proceedings ended with an out-of-court settlement that involved Écosociété paying compensation to Banro.

In February 2010 Barrick Gold sent a letter threatening legal action to everyone involved in the book Imperial Canada Inc.: Legal Haven of Choice for the World's Mining Industries, an English translation of a book by Deneault and William Sacher, also about the Canadian mining industry.

The case was profiled in Julien Fréchette's 2012 documentary film Silence Is Gold (Le Prix des mots).

== Bibliography ==
- Deneault, Alain (2020). Bande de colons. Une mauvaise conscience de classe. Lux Éditeur.
- Deneault, Alain (2016). Politiques de l'extrême centre. Lux Éditeur.
- Deneault, Alain (2015). La médiocratie. Lux Éditeur.
- Deneault, Alain (2014). Paradis fiscaux : la filière canadienne. Écosociété.
- Deneault, Alain (2013). Gouvernance : Le management totalitaire. Lux Éditeur.
- Deneault, Alain (2012). Faire l'économie de la haine : Douze essais pour une pensée critique. Écosociété.
- Deneault, Alain; Sacher, William (2012). Paradis sous terre : Comment le Canada est devenu une plaque tournante pour l'industrie minière mondiale. Écosociété.
- Deneault, Alain (2011). Redéfinir l'économie: La "Philosophie de l'argent" de Georg Simmel. Editions Universitaires Européennes.
- Deneault, Alain (2010). Offshore: Paradis fiscaux et souveraineté criminelle. La Fabrique Éditions.
- Deneault, Alain; Abadie, Delphine; Sacher, William (2008). Noir Canada: Pillage, corruption et criminalité en Afrique. Écosociété.
- Deneault, Alain (2005). Paul Martin & Compagnies. Vlb.

=== English translations ===
- Deneault, Alain (2021). Mediocracy: The Politics of the Extreme Centre.
- Deneault, Alain (2014). Canada: A New Tax Haven. Talonbooks.
- Deneault, Alain; William, Sacher (2012). Imperial Canada Inc.: Legal Haven of Choice for the World's Mining Industries. Talonbooks.
- Deneault, Alain (2011). Offshore: Tax Havens and the Rule of Global Crime. New Press.
- Deneault, Alain (2006). Paul Martin & Companies: Sixty Theses on the Alegal Nature of Tax Havens. Talonbooks.
