= Reason and Revolution =

1941 book by Herbert Marcuse

Reason and Revolution: Hegel and the Rise of Social Theory
- Cover of the first edition
- Author: Herbert Marcuse
- Language: English
- Subjects: Georg Wilhelm Friedrich Hegel; Karl Marx
- Publisher: Oxford University Press
- Publication date: 1941
- Publication place: United States
- Media type: Print (Hardcover and Paperback)
- Pages: 431 (1970 Beacon Press edition)
- ISBN: 0-8070-1557-1

Reason and Revolution: Hegel and the Rise of Social Theory (1941; second edition 1954) is a book by the philosopher Herbert Marcuse, in which the author discusses the social theories of the philosophers Georg Wilhelm Friedrich Hegel and Karl Marx. Marcuse reinterprets Hegel, with the aim of demonstrating that Hegel's basic concepts are hostile to the tendencies that led to fascism.

The book has received praise as an important discussion of Hegel and Marx.

== Summary ==
Reason and Revolution explores the philosophical underpinnings of Hegelian dialectic and its influence on the development of social theory, particularly within Marxism and critical theory. It examines Hegel's impact on the evolution of social and political thought, and has undergone multiple editions and reprints since its initial publication, maintaining its relevance in discussions concerning philosophy, sociology, and political theory.

Marcuse attempts to show that "Hegel's basic concepts are hostile to the tendencies that have led into Fascist theory and practice." Marcuse criticizes the thesis, propounded by the sociologist Leonard Hobhouse in The Metaphysical Theory of the State (1918), that Hegel provided an ideological preparation for German authoritarianism. In an appendix to the 1960 edition, Marcuse states that the "only major recent development in the interpretation of Hegel's philosophy is the postwar revival of Hegel studies in France." Marcuse credits the new French interpretation with showing clearly the "inner connection between the idealistic and materialistic dialectic". He provides a list of key works, including the philosopher Alexandre Kojève's Introduction to the Reading of Hegel (1947).

== Publication history ==
Reason and Revolution was first published by Oxford University Press in 1941. A second edition was published by Humanities Press, Inc., in 1954. In 1960, the book was published in a paperback edition by Beacon Press.

== Reception ==
The psychoanalyst Erich Fromm praised Reason and Revolution, calling it "brilliant and penetrating" and "the most important work which has opened up an understanding of Marx's humanism". The historian Peter Gay described the book as one of the most important discussions of alienation in the scholarly literature on Hegel and Marx. Jean-Michel Palmier saw the work as a rejection of Marcuse's Hegel's Ontology and the Theory of Historicity (1932), an interpretation of Hegel influenced by Martin Heidegger.
