= Silence Is Gold =

- French: Le Prix des mots
- Directed by: Julien Fréchette
- Written by: Julien Fréchette
- Produced by: Jean Simon Chartier; Colette Loumède
- Starring: Alain Deneault
- Cinematography: Étienne Boilard
- Edited by: Andrea Henriquez
- Music by: Zoé Dumais; Dany Nicolas
- Production companies: MC2 Communication; National Film Board of Canada
- Distributed by: TV5 Québec Canada
- Release date: November 2012 (RIDM)
- Running time: 102 minutes
- Country: Canada
- Language: French

Silence Is Gold (French: Le Prix des mots) is a Canadian documentary film, directed by Julien Fréchette and released in 2012. The film profiles writer Alain Deneault, who had to battle a SLAPP suit after the publication of his 2008 book Noir Canada: Pillage, corruption et criminalité en Afrique, about the activities of Canadian mining companies in Africa.

The film premiered at the 2012 Montreal International Documentary Festival, before going into wider release in February 2013.

== Awards ==
At RIDM, the film received an honorable mention from the Magnus Isacsson Award jury.

The film received a Jutra Award nomination for Best Documentary Film at the 16th Jutra Awards in 2014.
