= Jacques D'Hondt =

French philosopher (1920–2012)

- Born: 17 April 1920; Saint-Symphorien
- Died: 10 February 2012 (aged 91); 8th arrondissement of Paris

Jacques D'Hondt (April 17, 1920 in Saint-Symphorien, today a district of Tours - February 10, 2012 in Paris 8e) was a French philosopher and Resistance fighter.

== Biography ==
A young teacher in Chinon and a Communist sympathizer during the Second World War, Jacques D'Hondt was a member of the Combat resistance movement. A former student of Jean Hyppolite and Paul Ricœur, Professor Emeritus of Philosophy at the University of Poitiers, Jacques D'Hondt founded the Centre de Recherche et de Documentation sur Hegel et Marx (CRDHM) in Poitiers in 1970, which he directed until 1975. A member of the board of the Hegel-Vereinigung, he chaired the Société française de philosophie from 1981 to 1991, and the Association des sociétés de philosophie de langue française (ASPLF) from 1988 to 1996.

Jacques D'Hondt's work on Hegel (Hegel philosophe de l'histoire vivante, 1966, Hegel secret. Recherches sur les sources cachées de la pensée de Hegel, and Hegel en son temps, both published in 1968), Jacques D'Hondt gained international renown by restoring a historical face to the German philosopher, while shedding light on the processes that generated the “black legends” that ran rampant against him. This extremely rigorous research culminated in the soberly titled biography Hegel. Biographie, published in 1998. But Jacques D'Hondt's teaching, work and publications have not been devoted solely to “rehabilitating” the Hegel of his time: A participant in the philosophical recognition of Diderot and the materialist thinkers of the Enlightenment, Jacques D'Hondt is also an eminent reader of Marx (a resolute antagonist of Althusser's philosophical positions) and an interpreter of Marx's relationship to Hegel (the collection De Hegel à Marx, published in 1972, brings together only a small part of his contributions on the subject). A philosopher grasped by and within a continuous history, he is a critic of his contemporaries in L'Idéologie de la rupture (1978) and in many of his still dispersed publications.

He was doctoral advisor to the french philosopher Andre Doz.

== Works ==
- L'idéologie de la rupture (Philosophie d'aujourd'hui), Paris, PUF, 1978
- La Révolution française entre Lumières et Romantisme, Jacques d’Hondt, Simone Goyard-Fabre, Centre de philosophie politique et juridique de l’Université de Caen, 1989.

=== Works on Hegel ===
- Hegel, philosophe de l'histoire vivante, Paris, PUF, collection Epiméthée, 1966.
- Hegel secret : recherches sur les sources cachées de la pensée de Hegel, Paris, PUF, collection Epiméthée, 1968.
- Hegel en son temps, Paris, Éditions Sociales, 1968 ; ré-édité Éditions Delga, 2011.
- Hegel et la pensée moderne : séminaire sur Hegel dirigé par Jean Hyppolite au Collège de France (1967-1968); (textes publiés sous la direction de Jacques d'Hondt), Paris, PUF, collection Epiméthée, 1970.
- De Hegel à Marx, PUF, collection « Bibliothèque de Philosophie contemporaine », 1972.
- Hegel et l'hégélianisme, Paris, PUF, coll. « Que sais-je ? », 1982.
- Hegel : le philosophe du débat et du combat, Paris, Libraire générale française, collection « Le livre de poche. Textes et débats », 1984.
- Hegel : Biographie, Paris, Calmann-Lévy, collection « La vie des philosophes », 1998.

== Literature ==
- Michel Vadée et Jean-Claude Bourdin (dir.), La Philosophie saisie par l'histoire. Hommage à Jacques D'Hondt, Paris, Kimé, 1999.
- Fiorinda Li Vigni, Jacques D'Hondt e il percorso della ragione hegeliana, Naples, Città del Sole, 2002 (trad. fr. Jacques D'Hondt et le parcours de la raison hégélienne, Paris, L'Harmattan)
