= André Lalande (philosopher) =

French philosopher

André Lalande (French: [lalɑ̃d]; 19 July 1867, Dijon – 15 November 1964, Asnières) was a French philosopher. He was a proponent of rationalism.

He entered the École Normale Supérieure in 1885. In 1904, he was appointed professor of philosophy at the University of Paris.

Whilst still at school in 1883–4 he was taught by Émile Durkheim, whom he greatly appreciated. His notes have provided the basis for the publication Durkheim's Philosophy Lectures: Notes from the Lycée de Sens Course, 1883–1884 in 2004.

His doctoral thesis was entitled L'idée directrice de la dissolution opposée à celle de l'évolution. In 1901, he was one of the founders of the Société française de philosophie.

== Works ==
- 1893: Lectures sur la philosophic des sciences, Paris
- 1899: L'idée directrice de la dissolution opposée à celle de l'évolution Paris (revised and reissued as Les illusions évolutionnistes, Paris, 1930)
- 1899: Quid de Mathematica vel Rationali vel Naturali Senserit Baconus Verulamius, Paris, 1899 (in Latin)
- 1907: Précis raisonné de morale pratique, Paris: Hachette
- 1929: Les théories de l'induction et de l'expérimentation, Paris: Boivin
- 1948: La raison et les normes, Paris, 1948.
- 1960: Vocabulaire technique et critique de la philosophic 8Paris: Presses Universitaires de France
