= Emmanuel Renault =

French philosopher

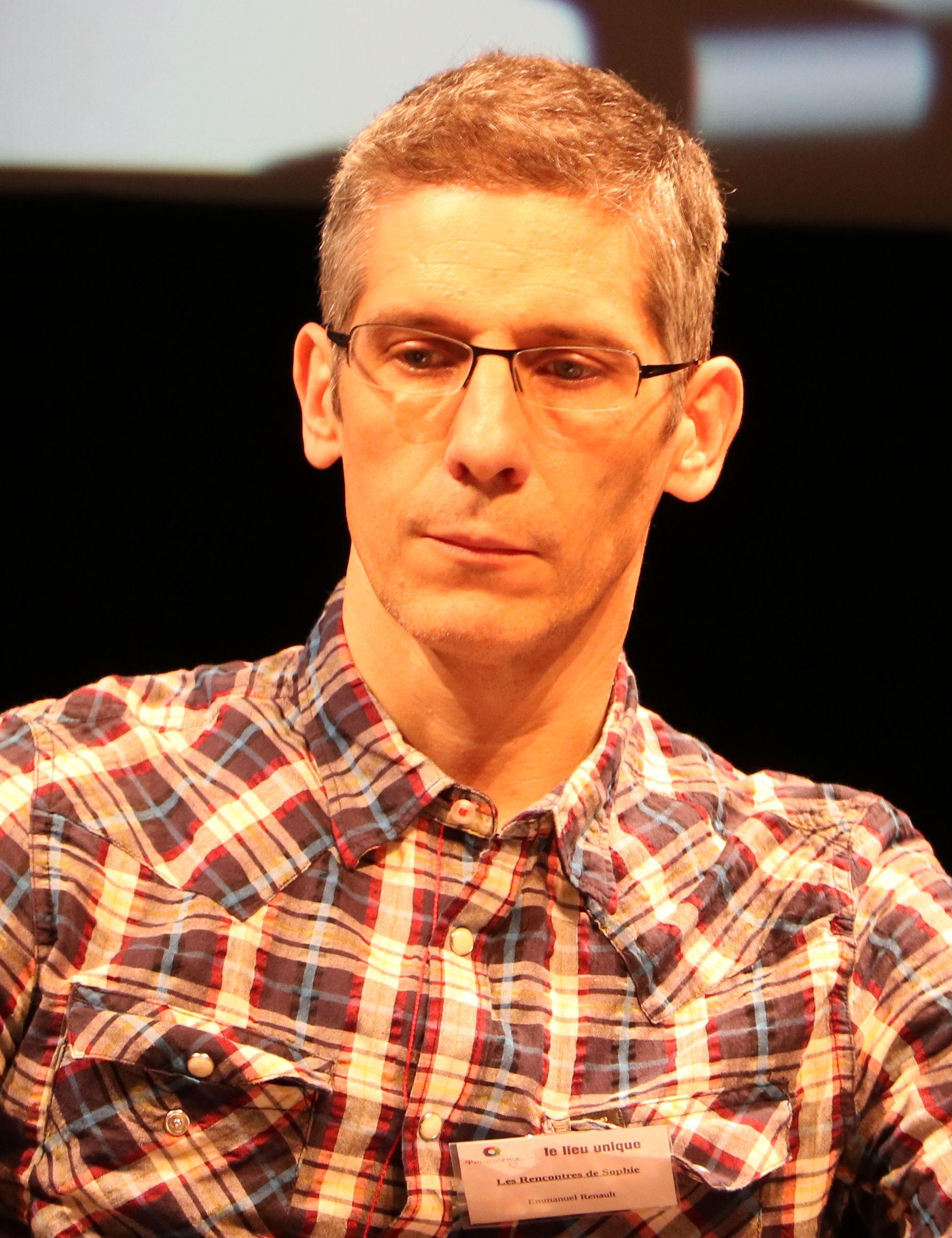
- Emmanuel Renault at Rencontres de Sophie, March 24, 2017, Lieu Unique, Nantes
- Born: July 14, 1967 (age 59)

Academic background
- Education: University of Burgundy Europe (PhD)
- Thesis: Philosophie de la nature et théorie des sciences chez Hegel : principes généraux et application à la chimie (1997)
- Doctoral advisor: André Doz

Emmanuel Renault (born July 14, 1967) is a French philosopher and professor of philosophy.

== Career ==
=== Youth and education ===
Emmanuel Renault is a professor of philosophy. He holds a doctorate in philosophy. His thesis, defended in 1997 under the supervision of André Doz, La philosophie de la nature et la théorie des sciences chez Hegel.

=== Professional positions ===
Emmanuel Renault teaches at the École normale supérieure de Lyon. He is currently a professor at the Paris Nanterre University.

== Contributions ==
Renault was one of the first interpreters of Hegel to take seriously the idea that one could speak of a genuinely Hegelian epistemology, which proceeds through the "dialectical correction" of the sciences of his time; in particular, he showed the specific ways in which Hegel referred to the chemistry of his era. In addition to his work on speculative philosophy, he is known for his numerous publications on Marx’s philosophy, including his positions on the idea of critique and his original views on the relationship between Marxism and the Young Hegelians. He was also the director of the journal Actuel Marx.

Continuing the reactivations of a critical theory of society, he is notably one of the introducers of Axel Honneth's philosophy in France (Social Disrespect, 2000), and his work on the theory of recognition is recognized as authoritative both in France and internationally. He has particularly deepened the questions concerning the relationship between the concepts of conflict, recognition, and domination in a fruitful dialogue between the ideas of Hegel, Marx, Honneth, Dewey, and Bourdieu (CNRS, 2017). In recent years, Emmanuel Renault has increasingly examined the conditions for a convergence between Marxist and pragmatist traditions, by bringing together Hegel, Marx, and Adorno with the pragmatism of Dewey. In his work, he advocates for a pragmatist, pluralist, and interdisciplinary vision of philosophy.

Emmanuel Renault is also known as one of the promoters of social philosophy in France. In addition to notable international interdisciplinary work devoted to the question of labor and that of exploitation, he has also written two decisive essays on social and political issues — one on the idea of justice and the other on the question of social suffering (both translated into English).

He has also co-authored, with Emin Boztepe, a master in the art of Wing Chun, Philosophy of Modern Martial Arts, a work in which he reflects, among other things, on the relationships between body, mechanics, dynamics, and power, particularly in the process of learning more or less demanding or complex techniques; and on the articulation between thought, action, and decision within the specific context of violence or self-defense.

== Publications ==
=== Articles ===
- Renault, Emmanuel (2016). "12 Social Self and Work in the Phenomenology of Spirit". brill.com: 202–219. doi:10.1163/9789004322967_013. ISBN 978-90-04-32296-7.
- Marx et l’idée de critique, PUF, 1995
- Mépris social, Le Passant, 2001
- Le vocabulaire de Marx, Ellipse, 2001
- Hegel. La Naturalisation de la dialectique, Vrin, 2002
- Philosophie chimique. Hegel et la science dynamiste de son temps, Presses universitaires de Bordeaux, 2002.
- Où en est la théorie critique, en collaboration avec Yves Sintomer, La Découverte, 2003
- L’Expérience de l’injustice. Reconnaissance et clinique de l’injustice, La Découverte, Collection « Armillaire », 2004, second édition remaniée en 2017 sous le titre L'expérience de l'injustice. Essai sur la théorie de la reconnaissance.
- Souffrances sociales. Sociologie, psychologie et politique, La Découverte, Collection « Armillaire », 2008
- Les 100 mots du Marxisme, PUF, « Que sais-je ? », 2009
- Lire Marx, en collaboration avec G. Duménil et M. Löwy, Paris, PUF, « Quadrige », 2009, 2e édition 2014; traduit en turc, espagnol et portugais.
- Marx et la philosophie, Paris, PUF, 2014.
- Connaître ce qui est. Enquête sur le présentisme hégélien, Paris, Vrin, 2015.
- Marx and Critical Theory, Brill, collection « Brill Research Perspectives », 2018.
- Reconnaissance, conflit, domination, Paris, CNRS éditions, 2017.
- Social Suffering. Sociology, Psychology, Politics, Rowman & Littelfield, 2017.
- Philosophie des Arts martiaux modernes, en collaboration avec Emin Boztepe, Vrin, collection Matière étrangère, 2017.
- The Return of Work in Critical theory, Columbia university press, collection « New Directions in Critical Theory », 2018 (en collaboration avec C. Dejours, J.-P. Deranty et N. Smith).
- The Experience of Injustice. A Theory of Recognition, Columbia university press, collection « New Directions in Critical Theory », 2019.
