= Pierre-Jean Labarrière =

French philosopher (1931–2018)

The Reverend Pierre-Jean Labarrière
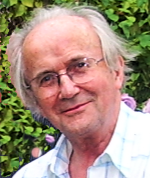
- Born: June 21, 1931; Norolles, France
- Died: July 12, 2018 (aged 87); Paris, France

Philosophical work
- Era: Contemporary philosophy
- Region: Western philosophy
- School: Continental

Pierre-Jean Labarrière (June 21, 1931 – July 12, 2018) was a French Jesuit and philosopher.

== Biography ==
Pierre-Jean Labarrière was born on June 21, 1931. He joined the Society of Jesus in 1949 and became ordained as a Catholic priest in 1963.

He received his Doctor of Philosophy from Pontifical Gregorian University, then docteur d'État in philosophy (1980), he was professor of philosophy at the Centre Sèvres Faculty of Philosophy, before teaching philosophy from 1983 at the Catholic University of Paris.

His main non-Christian inspirations were Plato, Kant and, above all, Hegel.

Throughout his life, he worked in collaboration with Gwendoline Jarczyk, in particular on Master Eckhart and Hegel.

Labarrière died on July 12, 2018, at the age of 87.

== Bibliography ==
=== Author ===
- Dieu aujourd'hui (in French). Paris: Desclée. 1977. p. 250. ISBN 2-7189-0101-2..
- Le Discours de l'altérité. Philosophie d'aujourd'hui (in French). Paris: Presses universitaires de France. 1983. p. 361. ISBN 2-13-037602-9..
- Odes à la nuit. Les Visions vives (in French). Paris: Saint-Germain-des-Prés. 1984. p. 95. ISBN 2-243-02510-8..
- Les visages de Dieu, Paris, Desclée de Brouwer / Bellarmin, 1986, collection « Croire aujourd'hui », 112 p. ISBN 978-2220026022.
- Introduction à la lecture de la phénoménologie, Paris, Aubier, 1992, collection « Analyse et raison » ISBN 978-2700701487.
- Structures et mouvement dialectique dans la "Phénoménologie de l'esprit" de Hegel, Paris, Aubier, 1992, collection « Analyse et raison » ISBN 978-2700703894.
- L'unité plurielle : Éloge, Paris, Aubier, 1992, collection « Présence et pensée », 188 p. ISBN 978-2700700084.
- De la Europa caronlongia a la era de Dante, Madrid, Ediciones Akal, 1997, collection « Historia del pensamiento y la cultura », 64 p. ISBN 978-8446007883.
- Poïétique : Quand l'utopie se fait histoire, Paris, Presses Universitaires de France, 1998, collection « Philosophie d'aujourd'hui », 336 p. ISBN 978-2130491088.
- Croire et comprendre : Approche philosophique de l'expérience chrétienne, Paris, Cerf, 1999, collection « Philo », 195 p. ISBN 978-2204060936.
- L'utopie logique, Paris, L'Harmattan, 2000 ISBN 978-2738416391.
- Au fondement de l'éthique : autostance et relation, Paris, Éditions Kimé, 2004, collection « Philosophie en cours », 106 p. ISBN 978-2841743483.
- Un silence d'environ une demi-heure, Librairie-Galerie Racine, Paris, 2006, 192 p. Ultime ouvrage ISBN 978-2-243-04206-1.

=== Co-author ===
- Hegeliana, co-auteur avec Gwendoline Jarczyk, Paris, Presses Universitaires de France, 1986, collection « Philosophie d'aujourd'hui », 368 p. ISBN 978-2130396659.
- Le syllogisme du pouvoir : y a-t-il une démocratie hégélienne ? , co-auteur avec Gwendoline Jarczyk, Paris, Aubier, 1992, Collection « Bibliothèque philosophique », 362 p. ISBN 978-2700734720.
- Maître Eckhart ou l'empreinte du désert, co-auteur avec Gwendoline Jarczyk, Paris, Albin Michel, 1995, Collection « Spiritualités vivantes », 262 p. ISBN 978-2226079190. Format Kindle, 2013 ASIN B00GWMCXIW.
- De Kojève à Hegel : 150 ans de pensée hégélienne, co-auteur avec Gwendoline Jarczyk, Paris, Albin Michel, 1996, Collection « Bibliothèque Albin Michel Idées », 272 p. ISBN 978-2226078667. Format Kindle, 2013 ASIN B00JE6S620.
- Philosophie, poésie, mystique, co-auteur avec Jean Greisch, Paris, Éditions Beauchesne, 1999, collection « Philosophie », 198 p. ISBN 978-2701013954.
- Le vocabulaire de Maître Eckhart, co-auteur avec Gwendoline Jarczyk, Paris, Ellipses, 2001, Collection « Vocabulaire de », 64 p. ISBN 978-2729804589. Réédition 2016 ISBN 978-2340010819.
- Le retour du Christ, co-auteur avec Armand Abécassis, Charles Perrot, Bernard Sesboüé, Jean Séguy, Bruxelles, Publications des Facultés universitaires Saint-Louis, 2002, 191 p. ISBN 978-2802800323.
- L'anneau immobile : Regards croisés sur Maître Eckhart, co-auteur avec Secundo Bongiovanni, Gwendoline Jarczyk, Benoît Vermander, Paris, Éditions des Facultés jésuites de Paris, 2005, 135 p. ISBN 978-2848470054.
- Hegel et la philosophie africaine : une lecture interprétative de la dialectique hégélienne, co-auteur avec Médéwalé-Jacob Agossou, Paris, Kartala, collection « Tropiques », 276 p. ISBN 978-2845866089.
- Contribution à la lecture commentée, Olivier Tinland, Bernard Bourgeois (dir.), La phénoménologie de Hegel à plusieurs voix, Ellipses marketing, 2008, collection « Philo », 304 p. ISBN 978-2729836313.
- Hegel, Science de la logique : la doctrine du concept : index des matières, Paris, éditions Kimé, 2015, collection « Logique hégélienne », 517 p. ISBN 978-2841747061.

=== Co-translator ===
- G.W.F. Hegel, Phénoménologie de l'esprit, co-traducteur avec Gwendoline Jarczyk, Paris, Gallimard, 1ère édition 1993, collection « Bibliothèque de philosophie », 928 p. ISBN 978-2070728817, réédition en 2002, coll. « Folio essais », 799 p. ISBN 978-2070421176.
- Maître Eckhart, L'étincelle de l'âme : sermons I à XXXe, co-traducteur avec Gwendoline Jarczyk, Paris, Albin Michel, 1998, collection « Spiritualité vivante », 323 p. ISBN 978-2226100818. Version Kindle, 2013 ASIN B00GWMD1QA.
- Maître Eckhart, Dieu au-delà de Dieu : sermons XXXI à LX, co-traducteur avec Gwendoline Jarczyk, Paris, Albin Michel, 1999, collection « Spiritualité vivante », 257 p. ISBN 978-2226107282. Version Kindle, 2013 ASIN B00GWFBM7M.
- Maître Eckhart, Le château de l'âme, co-traducteur avec Gwendoline Jarczyk, Paris, Desclée de Brouwer, 1995, collection « Les carnets », 87 p. ISBN 978-2220037011.
- Maître Eckhart, Et ce néant était Dieu... Sermons LXI à XC, co-traducteur avec Gwendoline Jarczyk, Paris, Albin Michel, 2000, collection « Spiritualité vivante », 260 p. ISBN 978-2226116444. Version Kindle, 2016 ASIN B00I8IMG62.
- Maître Eckhart, Sermons, co-traducteur avec Gwendoline Jarczyk, Paris, Albin Michel, 2009, collection « Spiritualité vivante », 792 p. ISBN 978-2226191021. Version Kindle, 2009 ASIN B01B99MDHS.
- Maître Eckhart, Les traités et le poème'', co-traducteur avec Gwendoline Jarczyk, Paris, Albin Michel, 2011, collection « Spiritualités vivantes », 240 p. ISBN 978-2226220486. Version Kindle, 2013 ASIN B00HCOVYYI.
- G.W.F. Hegel, Science de la logique : tome 1, La logique objective, premier livre : L'être (version de 1812), co-traducteur avec Gwendoline Jarczyk, Paris, éditions Kimé, 2006, collection « Logique hégélienne », 413 p. ISBN 978-2841743872.
- G.W.F. Hegel, Science de la logique : tome 2, La logique subjective ou la doctrine du concept, co-traducteur avec Gwendoline Jarczyk, Paris, éditions Kimé, 2e édition en 2014, collection « Logique hégélienne », 420 p. ISBN 978-2841746835.

=== Preface, postface ===
- Gwendoline Jarczyk, Le concept dans son ambiguïté : la manifestation du sensible chez Hegel, postface , Paris, éditions Kimé, 2006, collection « Logique hégélienne », 308 p. ISBN 978-2841743858.
- Gwendoline Jarczyk, Le Négatif ou l'écriture de l'autre dans la logique de Hegel, postface de Pierre-Jean Labarrière, Ellipses (collection " Philo "), Paris 1999.
- Gwendoline Jarczyk, Au confluent de la mort. L'univers et le singulier dans la philosophie de Hegel, postface de Pierre-Jean Labarrière, éditions Ellipses (collection " Philo "), Paris 2002.
- Gwendoline Jarczyk, La réflexion spéculative. Le retour et la perte dans la pensée de Hegel, postface de Pierre-Jean Labarrière, éditions Kimé (collection " Philosophie-épistémologie "), Paris, 2004.
- Gwendoline Jarczyk, Le concept dans son ambiguïté. La manifestation du sensible chez Hegel, postface Pierre-Jean Labarrière, éditions Kimé (collection " Logique hégélienne ") Paris, 2006.
