= Béatrice Longuenesse =

French philosopher (born 1950)

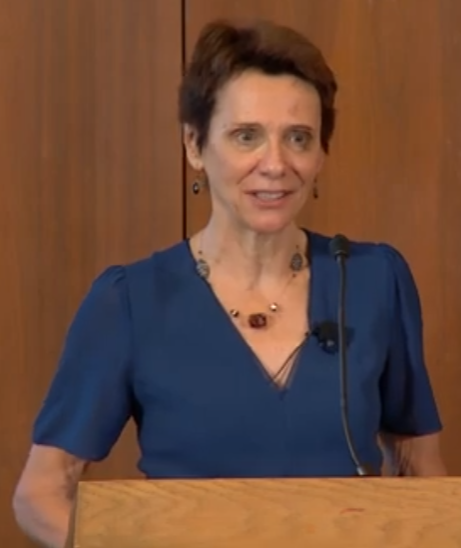
- Longuenesse giving the Howison Lecture "Self-Consciousness and 'I'" (2023)
- Born: September 6, 1950 (age 76)

Education
- Education: École Normale Supérieure; University of Paris I (PhD, 1992); Princeton University
- Theses: Le pouvoir de juger : sensibilité et discursivité dans l'Analytique transcendentale de Kant (1992); La Critique de la métaphysique dans la doctrine hégélienne de l'essence (1980)
- Doctoral advisors: Bernard Bourgeois; Hélène Védrine

Philosophical work
- Era: Contemporary philosophy
- Region: Western philosophy
- School: Continental philosophy
- Institutions: New York University, Princeton University, Paris-Sorbonne University, Université de Clermont-Ferrand, Université de Franche-Comté, École Normale Supérieure
- Notable students: Lachlan Murdoch
- Main interests: Immanuel Kant, G. W. F. Hegel, philosophy of mind
- Notable ideas: Kantian account of self-consciousness and first-person thought The Kantian thesis of the internalization to representation of the object of representation

Béatrice Longuenesse (French: [lɔ̃ɡnɛs]; born September 6, 1950) is a French philosopher and academic, who is the Silver Professor of Philosophy Emerita at New York University. Her work focuses on Immanuel Kant, Georg Wilhelm Friedrich Hegel, and the philosophy of mind. She is a fellow of the American Academy of Arts and Sciences. Longuenesse is one of the most prominent living Kant scholars, and her works have generated significant discussion around parts of Kant's corpus that were previously largely overlooked.

== Education and career ==
She studied at the École Normale Supérieure, the University of Paris I, and at Princeton University as a visiting student. She received her PhD ("doctorat de troisième cycle") with the thesis La Critique de la métaphysique dans la doctrine hégélienne de l'essence, in 1980 under Hélène Védrine, and her Doctorat d'État in 1992 from Paris I with the thesis Le pouvoir de juger : sensibilité et discursivité dans l'Analytique transcendentale de Kant under the direction of Bernard Bourgeois.

She taught at the Paris-Sorbonne University – Paris IV (1978–79), the École Normale Supérieure (1980–82), the Université de Franche-Comté (1983–85) and the Université de Clermont-Ferrand (1985–93) before joining Princeton University as an Associate Professor (1993–96) then full Professor (1996–2004). In 2004, she left Princeton for New York University (NYU). In 2011 she was elected to the American Academy of Arts and Sciences.

In 1979–80, Longuenesse was a Jane Eliza Procter fellow at Princeton, and from 1981–1983 she served as a research fellow in the department of music at the Bibliothèque nationale de France. In 2005, she was appointed as a fellow at NYU's Institute for the Humanities, a position she still holds. Starting in 2006 she held a fellowship at the Wissenschaftskolleg (Institute for Advanced Study, Berlin), and in 2010 she was appointed Silver Professor of Philosophy at New York University. In 2011 she was elected to the American Academy of Arts and Sciences. In 2012 and 2013 she received two different Berlin Prizes from the American Academy in Berlin, a Siemens fellowship and John Birkelund fellowship, respectively. At Princeton Lachlan Murdoch was a student of Longuenesse.

== Philosophical work ==
Longuenesse has written five books, edited two volumes, and published numerous refereed papers. Her books have been described as major contributions to Kantian and Hegelian scholarship.

- Hegel et la Critique de la métaphysique (Vrin, 1981). Appears in English as Hegel's Critique of Metaphysics (Cambridge University Press, 2007), with two new chapters and a new preface.
- Kant et le Pouvoir de juger. Sensibilité et discursivité dans l'Analytique Transcendantale de la Critique de la Raison Pure (Presses Universitaires de France, 1993). A revised and expanded English version appears as Kant and the Capacity to Judge. Sensibility and Discursivity in the Transcendental Analytic of the Critique of Pure Reason (Princeton University Press, 2000).
- Kant on the Human Standpoint (Cambridge University Press, 2005).
- I, Me, Mine: Back to Kant, and Back Again (Oxford University Press, 2017)
- The First Person in Cognition and Morality (Oxford University Press, 2019)
- The Organization of the Mind: Lessons from Kant and Freud, Oxford University Press, 2026

=== Kant the Capacity to Judge ===
Her first book in English, Kant and the Capacity to Judge. Sensibility and Discursivity in the Transcendental Analytic of the Critique of Pure Reason, focused on Kant's "Table of Judgements," arguing that it in fact formed the backbone of the rest of Kant's work.

=== Kant on the Human Standpoint ===
Her second book, Kant on the Human Standpoint, began by attempting to rebut some of the critiques of her first book, and went on to analyze other aspects of Kant's work, including his views on freedom, reason, and causality.

=== Hegel's Critique of Metaphysics ===
Her third book, Hegel's Critique of Metaphysics, starts by providing a close reading of some of Hegel's works that have traditionally been considered difficult to analyze, and goes on to make an argument that Hegel's work represents a novel reworking of Kant's ideas, and that the Hegelian corpus could be used as a base upon which to build a plausible alternative to Lockean empiricism.

=== Other philosophical work ===
The volume Longuenesse edited, Kant and the Early Moderns, was a collection of essays focusing on how Kant understood the work of philosophers that came before him, and how that shaped his own work.

=== Themes ===
==== Kant's critical philosophy ====
Longuenesse is well known for her work on Kant's theory of judgment, which, she argues, provides the crucial backbone for central arguments in Kant's critical system. Her first Kant book was originally published in French (Kant et le Pouvoir de Juger), then translated into English in a revised and expanded version (Kant and the Capacity to Judge). The book was broadly discussed and was especially influential in generating a new interest in Kant's logic and Kant's views on the role of imagination in perception and cognition, and Kant's explanation of concept acquisition. Longuenesse's work connects Kant's view to contemporary debates in philosophy of mind, for instance around the question of the conceptual or non-conceptual content of perception and the nature of rule following. Longuenesse's responses to the discussions elicited by her book have appeared in numerous articles, some of which were included in her second Kant book, Kant on the Human Standpoint (2005). This book expands her interpretation of Kant's theory of judgment to consideration of its role in Kant's philosophy of nature, moral philosophy and aesthetic theory.

==== Hegel's Science of Logic ====
Before beginning her systematic work on Kant, Longuenesse wrote and published on Hegel. In Hegel et la Critique de la Métaphysique, she argued that Hegel's Science of Logic should be read as a radicalization of Kant's transcendental logic. For Hegel just as for Kant, the categories of traditional metaphysics are universal forms of thinking rather than representations of intrinsic properties of things supposed to be independent of the activity of thinking. Contra Kant, however, Hegel argues that this characterization of the categories of metaphysics does not entail that we have no knowledge of things as they are in themselves. In more recent articles, some of which are gathered in the English version of her Hegel book, Longuenesse further explores the differences between Hegel's and Kant's respective views of the nature of concepts, judgments, and inferences. She lays out the consequences of those views for an assessment of the possibility and limits of metaphysics.

==== Philosophy of mind and self-consciousness ====
Longuenesse's recent work has expanded beyond the history of modern philosophy into contemporary philosophy of mind and language, in connection with psychology and neuroscience. Her work focuses on the nature of self-consciousness and its relation to the use of the first-person pronoun in language and in thought. She argues that our uses of 'I' depend on two fundamental kinds of self-consciousness: consciousness of oneself as engaged in a mental activity apt to generate and assess reasons for our beliefs and actions; and consciousness of oneself as an embodied entity. An important aspect of Kant's legacy, she claims, is to have clearly distinguished these two kinds of self-consciousness and taken the first to be fundamental to any use of 'I'. She draws on resources from both the "analytic" and the "continental" traditions of philosophy to offer an original contribution to contemporary debates on self-consciousness. Her work in this area has appeared in interdisciplinary venues alongside that of linguists, philosophers of language, and neuroscientists.

== Honors and awards ==
- Hegel Prize (2021)

== Bibliography ==
- Kant and the Capacity to Judge (Princeton University Press, 1998) ISBN 978-0-691-04348-7
- Kant on the Human Standpoint (Cambridge University Press, 2005) ISBN 978-0-521-83478-0
- Hegel's Critique of Metaphysics (Cambridge University Press, 2007) ISBN 978-0-521-84466-6
