= What Is an Author? =

1969 lecture given by Michel Foucault

"What Is an Author?" (French: Qu'est-ce qu'un auteur?) is one of the most important lectures given at the Société française de philosophie on 22 February 1969 by French philosopher, sociologist and historian Michel Foucault. For a contemporary English translation, see the corresponding chapters in Language, Counter-Memory, Practice: Selected Essays and Interviews or Textual Strategies: Perspectives in Post-Structuralist Criticism.

[T]he author is not an indefinite source of significations which fill a work; the author does not precede the works, he is a certain functional principle by which, in our culture, one limits, excludes, and chooses; in short, by which one impedes the free circulation, the free manipulation, the free composition, decomposition, and recomposition of fiction. In fact, if we are accustomed to presenting the author as a genius, as a perpetual surging of invention, it is because, in reality, we make him function in exactly the opposite fashion. One can say that the author is an ideological product, since we represent him as the opposite of his historically real function. [...] The author is therefore the ideological figure by which one marks the manner in which we fear the proliferation of meaning.

For many, Foucault's lecture responds to Roland Barthes' essay "The Death of the Author".
