= Compensation =

Compensation may refer to:

- Financial compensation
- Compensation (chess), various advantages a player has in exchange for a disadvantage
- Compensation (essay), by Ralph Waldo Emerson
- Compensation (film), a 1999 film
- Compensation (psychology)
- Biological compensation, the characteristic pattern of bending of the plant or mushroom stem after turning from the normal vertical position
- Tuning compensation in brass instruments
- Compensation, a specific form of camouflaging in autistic people

== See also ==
- "Compensating", a song by Aminé from his 2020 album Limbo
