= Political law =

Political law (or political activity law) is an established legal practice area encompassing the intersection of politics and law. Political law comprises election law, voting rights law, campaign finance law, laws governing lobbying and lobbyists, open government laws, legislative and executive branch ethics codes, legislative procedure, administrative procedure, constitutional law, and legislative and regulatory drafting. Political laws are applied primarily to government officials, candidates, advocacy groups, lobbyists, businesses, nonprofit organizations, and trade unions.

At the federal level, the Federal Election Commission enforces campaign finance law with respect to races for the United States House of Representatives, United States Senate, and the office of President of the United States. Campaigns for federal office are subject to contribution limits and certain contributions are prohibited. The Department of Justice's Public Integrity Section (PIN) has jurisdiction involving alleged criminal violations of many political laws.

At the state level, most states have administrative agencies to enforce state laws concerning campaign finance and ethics rules. The attorney general of the State may also play a role in enforcement. Some local governments also maintain ethics agencies. At the state and local level, these agencies might provide for disclosure of campaign finance registration and reporting forms (or lobbyist registration and reporting), or they may give an enforcement scheme. Political Law—is that branch of public Law which deals with the organization and operations of the governmental organs of the State and defines the State's relations with its territory's inhabitants.

"Pay-to-play" restrictions are an example of political law. For instance, in the context of municipal securities dealers, rules promulgated by the Municipal Securities Rulemaking Board effectively prohibit certain individuals from contributing to the political funds of officials of issuers.

== See also ==
- Election law
