= Xavier Léon =

French-Jewish philosopher and historian

Xavier Léon (21 May 1868, Boulogne-Billancourt – 21 October 1935, Paris) was a French-Jewish philosopher and historian of philosophy.

In 1893 Léon – together with Élie Halévy and others – helped found the French philosophical journal Revue de métaphysique et de morale. Léon remained editor of the journal until his death in 1935, when he was succeeded by Dominique Parodi. In 1900 he founded the International Congress of Philosophy, and in 1901 the Société Française de Philosophie. He wrote extensively on Johann Gottlieb Fichte. He lived at Château de Combault from 1909, and is buried in the Jewish section of Père-Lachaise Cemetery.

== Works ==
- La philosophie de Fichte, ses rapports avec la conscience contemporaine, Paris: F. Alcan, 1902
- Fichte et son temps, Paris: A Colin, 1922
- Établissement et prédication de la doctrine de la liberté : la vie de Fichte jusqu'au départ d'Jéna (1762-1799), 1922
- La lutte pour l'affranchissement national (1806 - 1813), 1924
- Fichte à Berlin (1799 - 1813) : la lutte pour l'affranchissement national (1806 - 1813), 1927
