= Jean-François Kervégan =

French philosopher (born 1950)

- Born: December 5, 1950 (age 75); Algiers, French Algeria

Academic background
- Education: Jean Moulin University Lyon 3 (PhD)
- Thesis: Dialectique et positivité : Hegel, Carl Schmitt et l'effectivité du politique (1990)
- Doctoral advisor: Bernard Bourgeois

Academic work
- Institutions: Paris 1 Panthéon-Sorbonne University

Jean-François Kervégan (born December 5, 1950) is a French philosopher of law.

== Biography ==
An alumnus of the École normale supérieure de Saint-Cloud (promotion L1972), agrégé (1975) and Doctor d'État in philosophy (1990), he has been Emeritus Professor at the Panthéon-Sorbonne Université since 2019, where he created the NoSoPhi (Normes, Sociétés, Philosophies) research group; he is an honorary senior member of the Institut Universitaire de France.

A member of various learned societies and the scientific bodies of numerous French and foreign journals, he is, with Olivier Beaud, editor of the Bibliothèque de la pensée juridique published by Classiques Garnier.

== Research areas ==
Jean-François Kervégan's work lies at the intersection of three fields: classical German philosophy (with Hegel and Kant as privileged objects), political philosophy (theory of the state and sovereignty, politics and conflictuality) and philosophy of law (theory of normativity, relations between legal normativity and ethics).

After initial academic work devoted to Husserl and Hegel's Logic, as well as to the confrontation between Hegel's political thought and that of Carl Schmitt, for over twenty years he dedicated himself to the study of the legal, social and political philosophy of German idealism, with a particular interest in Hegel, but also in Kant.

In the field of political philosophy, Kervégan is interested in the fate of concepts such as the state, sovereignty, democracy and human rights. Beyond the historical aspects of this questioning, the aim is to reflect on the non-state figures of the political that have developed in the contemporary world, such as terrorism, and what they can mean for a thinking of the political that remains attached to the achievements of modernity, without being blind to what can bend or undermine its emancipatory project.

In the field of legal philosophy, he focuses on the status of legal normativity. After reflecting on how Kant's and Hegel's reflections on normativity (“practical reason”) can inform the contemporary (post-Kelsenian, analytic) debate on legal theory and help resolve some of its difficulties, he has been devoting himself to the theory of rights for the past ten years.

== Works ==
=== In English ===
- Kervegan, Jean-Francois; Ginsburg, Daniela; Shuster, Martin (2018). The Actual and the Rational: Hegel and Objective Spirit. University of Chicago Press. doi:10.7208/chicago/9780226023946.001.0001. ISBN 9780226023946.

=== In French ===
- Hegel, Carl Schmitt : le politique entre spéculation et positivité, PUF, coll. « Léviathan », 1992 ; rééd. PUF, coll. « Quadrige », 2005. Traduit en espagnol et en portugais.
- Hegel et l’hégélianisme, PUF, coll. « Que sais-je ? », 2005. Traduit en portugais, arabe et turc.
- L'effectif et le rationnel : Hegel et l'esprit objectif, Vrin, coll. « Bibliothèque d’histoire de la philosophie », 2008. Traduit en anglais, allemand et chinois.
- Que faire de Carl Schmitt ?, Gallimard, coll. « Tel », 2011. Traduit en allemand, espagnol, italien et tchèque.
- La raison des normes ; essai sur Kant, Vrin, coll. « Moments philosophiques », 2015.
- Variazioni Kelseniane, Naples, ESI, 2016.
- Explorations allemandes, CNRS Editions, 2019.

He is also co-author, editor or co-publisher of the works:

- Introduction à la lecture de la Science de la logique de Hegel, Aubier, 3 tomes, 1981-1987.
- Recht zwischen Natur und Geschichte / Le droit entre nature et histoire, avec H. Mohnhaupt, V. Klostermann, 1997.
- Liberté sociale et lien contractuel / Gesellschaftliche Freiheit und vertragliche Bindung, avec H. Mohnhaupt, V. Klostermann, 1999.
- Influences et réceptions mutuelles du droit et de la philosophie en France et en Allemagne / Wechselseitige Beeinflussungen und Rezeptionen von Recht und Philosophie in Deutschland und Frankreich, avec H. Mohnhaupt, V. Klostermann, 2001.
- Crise et pensée de la crise en droit. Weimar, sa république et ses juristes, ENS éditions, 2002.
- De la société à la sociologie, avec Catherine Colliot-Thélène, ENS Editions, 2002.
- Hegel, penseur du droit, avec Gilles Marmasse, CNRS éditions, 2004.
- Wirtschaft und Wirtschaftstheorien in Rechtsgeschichte und Philosophie, avec H. Mohnhaupt, V. Klostermann, 2004.
- Modernité et sécularisation : Hans Blumenberg, Karl Löwith, Carl Schmitt, Leo Strauss, avec Michaël Fœssel et Myriam Revault d'Allonnes, CNRS éditions, 2007.
- Adolf Reinach, entre droit et phénoménologie, avec Jocelyn Benoist, CNRS éditions, 2008.
- Raison pratique et normativité chez Kant : Droit, politique et cosmopolitique, ENS éditions, 2010.
- Hegel au présent. Une relève de la métaphysique?, avec Bernard Mabille, CNRS Editions, 2012.
- Norme et violence. Une enquête franco-italienne, avec P.-Y. Quiviger et M. Plouviez, Olms, 2015.
- Manuel de l'idéalisme allemand, avec H. J. Sandkühler, Ed. du Cerf, 2015.
- « Alexandre Kojève face à Carl Schmitt », Philosophie n° 135 (septembre 2017).
- Dialogues avec Jürgen Habermas, avec Isabelle Aubert, CNRS Éditions, 2018.
- Droits subjectifs et citoyenneté, avec Olivier Beaud et Catherine Colliot-Thélène, Classiques Garnier, 2019.
- « Institutions », avec Christian Schmidt et Benno Zabel, Trivium 32 (2021) (en ligne).
- « Actualité ou inactualité du droit naturel », Revue de Métaphysique et de Morale, 2021/4.

J.-F. Kervégan has also translated, presented and commented on Hegel's Principes de la philosophie du droit, PUF, 1998. New revised and expanded edition, PUF, coll. “Quadrige”, 2003. Third revised and expanded edition of Additions by Eduard Gans, PUF, “Quadrige” series, 2013.
