= Introduction to the Reading of Hegel =

1947 book by Alexandre Kojève

Introduction to the Reading of Hegel: Lectures on the Phenomenology of Spirit
- Cover of the first edition
- Author: Alexandre Kojève
- Original title: Introduction à la Lecture de Hegel
- Translator: James H. Nichols, Jr
- Language: French
- Subject: Georg Wilhelm Friedrich Hegel
- Published: 1947 (Gallimard, in French); 1969 (Basic Books, in English)
- Publication place: France
- Media type: Print (Hardcover and Paperback)
- Pages: 287 (English edition)
- ISBN: 0-8014-9203-3 (English edition)
- LC Class: 80-66908

Introduction to the Reading of Hegel: Lectures on the Phenomenology of Spirit (French: Introduction à la Lecture de Hegel) is a 1947 book about Georg Wilhelm Friedrich Hegel by the philosopher Alexandre Kojève, in which the author combines the labor philosophy of Karl Marx with the Being-Toward-Death of Martin Heidegger. Kojève develops many themes that would be fundamental to existentialism and French theory such as the end of history and the Master-Slave dialectic.

== Summary ==
Kojève argues that Hegel's System needs to be seen as circular and returning to itself.

Kojève takes Heidegger's concept of Angst in the face of death and applies it to the fear the Slave fears in his initial conflict with the Master. It is the slave's unwillingness to accept death, in contrast with the Master, that leads to their unequal relationship.

Influenced by Heidegger's insights into the manner in which Dasein stands before earthly death, Kojève sees man as a fundamentally negative creature, who negates existence through labor.

== Reception ==
The philosopher Herbert Marcuse, in a 1960 appendix to Reason and Revolution (first published 1941), writes that the "only major recent development in the interpretation of Hegel's philosophy" is the "postwar revival of Hegel studies in France". Marcuse credits the "new French interpretation" with showing clearly "the inner connection between the idealistic and materialistic dialectic", and lists Kojève's book as one of the key works.

Some have argued that the book is more an elaboration of Kojève's own philosophy rather than a mere commentary on Hegel. For example F. Roger Devlin claims it is like calling Aquinas's Summa Theologica a mere introduction to Aristotle. Stefanos Geroulanos interprets Kojève's Hegel within the scope of debates on phenomenology and quantum indeterminacy in 1930s France, and argues that Kojève's text blends Hegel and Heidegger to offer multiple versions of key antihumanist concepts like the "Death of Man" and "the end of history."

Simone de Beauvoir's reading of the book would emphasize the Master-Slave relation between men and women she saw in The Second Sex (1949).

In Jon Stewart's anthology The Hegel Myths and Legends (1996), Introduction to the Reading of Hegel is listed as a work that has propagated "myths" about Hegel. Robert B. Pippin expressed a similar judgment in Idealism as Modernism: Hegelian Variations, writing that Kojève's readings "represent truncated and unsatisfactory jumblings of Hegelian ideas which get a better hearing in the original."

The work has also been subject of critical analysis by Paul Redding, George Armstrong Kelly and Patrick T. Riley among others.
