= André Doz =

French philosopher (1928–2013)

- Born: André Léon Doz; 13 August 1928; Issy-les-Moulineaux
- Died: 7 December 2013 (aged 85); 15th arrondissement of Paris
- Occupation: Philosopher, university teacher

André Doz (born August 13, 1928 in Issy-les-Moulineaux – 2013) was a French philosopher and educator.

== Life and work ==
Doz received his degree as a Doctor of Philosophy in 1969 from Sorbonne University and subsequently his Doctorat d'Etat from University of Poitiers in 1986, under the supervision of Jacques D'Hondt, with the thesis title "La logique de Hegel et les problèmes traditionnels de l'ontologie", which later on was published as a book in 1987. In the book, Doz advocates that Hegel's Science of Logic be read as a "first-order ontological doctrine". Hence Doz locates Hegel's Logic within a tradition of ontological inquiry. For doing so, he draws on a variety of figures within the history of philosophy, such as Anaximander, Diogenes Laertius, Plotinus, Boethius, Patristic philosophers, and Avicenna among others. The book has been the subject of reviews by d'Hubert Faes, Olivier Depré, Maurice de Gandillac and P. Cruysberghs. Doz's reading of Hegel along with Jean Hyppolite's Logic and Existence has been described as one of Classic interpretations of Hegel.

His 2001 work, Parcours Philosophique is a collection of essays written during the period of 1968-2000, written on different figures, from Aristotle to Heidegger (Kant, Spinoza etc.) according to Angelica Nuzzo "taken together they offer a great lesson in the method of historical-philosophical reconstruction" over which the shadow of Hegel looms large.

=== Selected works ===
==== Books ====
- La voie de l'être - André Doz (in French). Editions L'Harmattan. 2015.
- La logique de Hegel et les problèmes traditionnels de l'ontologie. J. Vrin. 1987. ISBN 978-2-7116-0960-4.
- Doz, Dominique Dubarle André (1972). Logique Et Dialectique. Paris, Larousse.

==== Articles ====
- Doz, André (1976). "Martin Heidegger". Revue de Métaphysique et de Morale. 81 (4): 433–437. JSTOR 40901716.
