= Revue de métaphysique et de morale =

French philosophy journal

The Revue de métaphysique et de morale is a French philosophy journal co-founded in 1893 by Léon Brunschvicg, Xavier Léon and Élie Halévy. The journal initially appeared six times a year, but since 1920 has been published quarterly. It was the leading French-language journal for philosophical debates at the turn of the 20th century, hosting articles by Victor Delbos, Bergson, etc., and still exists today.

Xavier Léon served as the first editor of the journal until his death in 1935, when he was succeeded by Dominique Parodi. On Parodi's death in 1955, the journal was headed by Jean Wahl.

It published in 1906 Bertrand Russell's article on the Berry paradox, as well as articles by Louis Bachelier, the logicist Jean Nicod, the mathematician Henri Poincaré, Gustave Belot, Félix Ravaisson, Célestin Bouglé, Henri Delacroix (concerning William James), Louis Couturat, Sully Prudhomme, Henri Maldiney, Francine Bloch, Frédéric Rauh, Jean Cavaillès, Julien Benda, Georges Poyer, Maurice Merleau-Ponty, Georg Simmel, etc. More recently: Barbara Cassin, etc.

== Some articles ==
- Poincaré, Henri (1898), "La mesure du temps" (PDF), Revue de métaphysique et de morale, 6: 1–13, Bibcode:1898RvMpM...6....1P (PDF) Reprinted in "The value of science" (1905a).
- Delacroix, Henri, "Les Variétés de l'expérience religieuse par William James", Revue de métaphysique et de morale, 11.5 (Sept 1903): 642–669
- Cavaillès, Jean (1940), "Du collectif au pari", Revue de métaphysique et de morale, XLVII: 139–163
- Merleau-Ponty, Maurice (July–October 1947), "La métaphysique dans l'homme", Revue de métaphysique et de morale, 52 (3–4) (Republished in Maurice Merleau-Ponty, Sens et non-sens, Paris, Éditions Nagel (1966) and in a 1966 edition of Sens et non-sens with new pagination by Éditions Gallimard, NRF, in the series 'Bibliothèque de philosophie', 1996, pp. 102–119.)
- Simmel, Georg (1894), "Le problème de la sociologie" (PDF), Revue de métaphysique et de morale, archived from the original (PDF) on 2007-09-27 (Same text in RTF)

== See also ==
- Twentieth-century French philosophy
- Wahl's Collège philosophique, whose lectures were sometimes published in the Revue
