= Dominique Parodi =

French philosopher and educational administrator

- Born: 2 May 1870; Genoa
- Died: November 12, 1955 (aged 85); Paris
- Citizenship: French
- Education: École normale supérieure Lycée Condorcet
- Occupations: Philosopher, sociologist
- Employer(s): l'Académie de Paris, l'Éducation nationale
- Organization: Académie des sciences morales et politiques
- Children: Alexandre Parodi René Parodi
- Honours: Commandeur de la Légion d'honneur

Dominique Parodi (May 2, 1870 – November 12, 1955) was a French philosopher and educational administrator.

Dominique Parodi was born in Genoa. He was the son of Margarita (née Vitale) and Dominique-Alexandre Parodi; his father was a poet and dramatist of Graeco-Italian background. A member of the group around Émile Durkheim, he was a contributor to their journal, L'Année Sociologique. Between 1919 and 1934 he was General Inspector of Public Instruction. He succeeded Xavier Léon as editor of the Revue de métaphysique et de morale, editing it from 1935 to 1955.

== Works ==
- Traditionalisme et démocratie, 1909
- Le problème moral et la pensée contemporaine, 1910
- La philosophie contemporaine en France; essai de classification des doctrines, 1919
- La Siris by George Berkeley, 1920 (translation of the book with Georges Beaulavon)
- 'De l'explication dans les sciences par E. Meyerson', Revue de métaphysique et de morale 31 (1924), pp. 585–97
- Les bases psychologiques de la vie morale, 1928
- Du positivisme à l'idéalisme: études critiques, 1930
- En quête d'une philosophie; essais de philosophie première, 1935
- Le problème politique et la démocratie, 1945
