= Lux Éditeur =

Canadian publishing house

Lux Éditeur is a Québécoise publishing house, based in Montréal, specialising in the history of the Americas and left-libertarian politics. Its works are distributed by Harmonia Mundi in Europe and Flammarion in Canada.

Founded in 1995 under the name Comeau & Nadeau by historians Robert Comeau and Jean-François Nadeau, it took the name Lux Éditeur in 2002, after the departure of Jean-François Nadeau, who became literary editor of Devoir. Since then, Lux has become part of the independent publishing scene in Québec, and part of the French market since the end of the 1990s, especially since the emergence of publishes such as Agone, La Fabrique, Les Prairies ordinaires, Syllepse, Éditions Amsterdam and Éditions Aden.

== Authors ==
Lux publishes contemporary authors (Québécois, Americans, French) as well as historic texts (Jules Fournier, Louis-Joseph Papineau, etc.).

Among their authors are:

- Francis Dupuis-Déri
- Pierre Vadeboncœur
- Normand Baillargeon
- Bernard Émond
- Noam Chomsky
- André D'Allemagne
- Jean-François Nadeau
- Howard Zinn
- Jean Bricmont
- Richard Desjardins
- Eduardo Galeano
