= Gustave Belot =

French philosopher and educational administrator

Gustave Belot (French: [ɡystav bəlo]; 7 August 1859 – 21 December 1929) was a French philosopher and educational administrator.

Gustave Belot was born 7 August 1859 at Strasbourg, the son of a professor in the faculty of letters at Lyons. He entered the École Normale Supérieure in 1878, taking the philosophy agrégation in 1881, and becoming a provincial philosophy instructor at Brest and elsewhere. In 1899 he succeeded Lucien Lévy-Bruhl as professor of philosophy at the lycée Louis-le-Grand. In 1911 he was appointed Inspector of the Paris Academy, and in 1913 he became Inspector-General of Secondary Instruction. He died in Paris on 21 December 1929. Informed by Durkheimian sociology, he was a theorist of collectively-held 'lay morality', which was rational and based upon general interest.

Gustave Belot is the brother of Émile Belot (1857-1944), engineer, inventor and astronomer, and the great great uncle of Pierre Pincemaille (1956-2018), musician and organist.

== Works ==
- Études sur la philosophie morale, au XIXe siècle: leçons professées á l'École des hautes études sociales, 1904.
- Études de morale positive, 1907.
- Morales et religions: leçons professées á l'École des hautes études sociales, 1909.
- La conscience française et la guerre, 1921.
