= Lord–bondsman dialectic =

Passage of a book by Georg Wilhelm Friedrich Hegel

The lord–bondsman dialectic (German: Herrschaft und Knechtschaft; also translated master–servant dialectic) is a famous passage in Georg Wilhelm Friedrich Hegel's The Phenomenology of Spirit. (Note: As of 2025, there are five English translations of Phänomenologie des Geistes: James Baillie (1910), A. V. Miller (1977), and Michael Inwood (2018) use "Lordship and bondage"; Terry Pinkard (2018) and Peter Fuss and John Dobbins (2019) use "Mastery and servitude".)) It is widely considered a key element in Hegel's philosophical system, and it has heavily influenced many subsequent philosophers.

The passage describes, in narrative form, the development of self-consciousness as such in an encounter between what are thereby (i.e., emerging only from this encounter) two distinct, self-conscious beings. The essence of the dialectic is the movement or motion of recognizing, in which the two self-consciousnesses are constituted in each being recognized as self-conscious by the other. This movement, inexorably taken to its extreme, takes the form of a "struggle to the death" in which one masters [beherrscht] the other, only to find that such lordship makes the very recognition he had sought impossible, since the bondsman, in this state, is not free to offer it.

This passage has been influential in a variety of disciplines. In particular, Alexandre Kojève's anthropological interpretation of what he renders the master–slave dialectic (French: Dialectique du maître et de l'esclave) has inspired 20th-century work on topics Hegel never pursued, such as feminism and critical race studies.

== Context ==
"Independent and Dependent Self-Consciousness: Lordship and Bondage" is the first of two titled subsections in the "Self-Consciousness" chapter of Phenomenology. It is preceded in the chapter by a discussion of "Life" and "Desire", among other things, and is followed by "Free Self-Consciousness: Stoicism, Skepticism, and the Unhappy Consciousness".

Hegel wrote this story or myth in order to explain his idea of how self-consciousness dialectically sublates into what he variously refers to as absolute knowledge, spirit, and science.

== Recognition ==
Crucially, for Hegel, absolute knowing cannot come to be without first a self-consciousness recognizing another self-consciousness. He maintained that the entire reality is immediately present to self-consciousness. It undergoes three stages of development:

- Desire, where self-consciousness is directed at things other than itself
- Lord-bondsman, where the self-consciousness is directed at another that is unequal to itself
- Universal self-consciousness, where the self-consciousness recognizes itself in another.

Such an issue in the history of philosophy had only ever been explored by Johann Gottlieb Fichte and its treatment marks a watershed in European philosophy.

== Hegel's parable ==
Hegel narrates an abstracted, idealized history about how two people meet. However, Hegel's idea of the development of self-consciousness from consciousness, and its sublation into a higher unity in absolute knowledge, is not the contoured brain of natural science and evolutionary biology, but a phenomenological construct with a history; one that must have passed through a struggle for freedom before realising itself.

The abstract language used by Hegel never allows one to interpret this story in one way. It can be read as self-consciousness coming to itself through a child's or adult's development, or self-consciousness coming to be in the beginning of human history or as that of a society or nation realizing freedom.

That the lord–bondsman dialectic can be interpreted as an internal process occurring in one person or as an external process between two or more people is a result, in part, of the fact that Hegel asserts an "end to the antithesis of subject and object". What occurs in the human mind also occurs outside of it. The objective and subjective, according to Hegel, sublate one another until they are unified, and the "story" takes this process through its various "moments" when the lifting up of two contradictory moments results in a higher unity.

First, the two natural beings meet and find that self-consciousness is embodied in another "independent existence." The two beings are aware that each can only be "for itself" (that is, self-conscious) when the ambiguous other is superseded—that is, made to recognize the self's pre-reflective, exclusionary "being-for-self." One being will in effect seek to establish a monopoly over self-consciousness or the certainty of oneself as thinking being. Hence, the self-consciousness that results from this initial meeting is necessarily incomplete, as each views the other as an "unessential, negatively characterized object" rather than an equivalent subject. The two individuals manipulate the other for their own particular ends. Narcissistically, they become mesmerized by seeing themselves "reflected" in another and attempt, as they previously had done in controlling their own body, to assert their will.

According to Hegel,

On approaching the other it has lost its own self, since it finds itself as another being; secondly, it has thereby sublated that other, for this primitive consciousness does not regard the other as essentially real but sees its own self in the other.

=== Reaction ===
When initially confronted with another person, the self cannot be immediately recognized: 'Appearing thus immediately on the scene, they are for one another like ordinary objects, independent shapes, individuals submerged in the being [or immediacy] of Life'.

=== Death struggle ===
A struggle to the death ensues. However, if one of the two should die, the achievement of self-consciousness fails. Hegel refers to this failure as "abstract negation" not the negation or sublation required. This death is avoided by the agreement, communication of, or subordination to, bondage. In this struggle the lord emerges as lord because he does not fear death since he does not see his identity dependent on life, while the bondsman out of this fear consents to servitude. This experience of fear on the part of the bondsman is crucial, however, in a later moment of the dialectic, where it becomes the prerequisite experience for the bondsman's further development.

=== Lordship and bondage ===
Truth of oneself as self-consciousness, as mediated rather than immediate "being-for-oneself" is achieved only if both live; the recognition of the other gives each of them the objective truth and self-certainty required for self-consciousness. Thus, the two enter into the relation of lord and bondsman and preserve the recognition of each other: "In this recognition the unessential consciousness [of the bondsman] is for the lord the object, which constitutes the truth of his certainty of himself."

=== Contradiction and resolution ===
However, this state is not a happy one and does not achieve full self-consciousness. The recognition by the bondsman is merely on pain of death. The lord's self-consciousness is dependent on the bondsman for recognition and also has a mediated relation with nature: the bondsman works with nature and begins to shape it into products for the lord. As the bondsman creates more and more products with greater and greater sophistication through his own creativity, he begins to see himself reflected in the products he created, he realizes that the world around him was created by his own hands, thus the slave is no longer alienated from his own labor and achieves self-consciousness, while the lord on the other hand has become wholly dependent on the products created by his bondsman; thus the lord is enslaved by the labour of his bondsman. According to Hegel's Lectures on the Philosophy of World History, "Humankind has not liberated itself from servitude but by means of servitude".

== Interpretations ==
One interpretation of this dialectic is that neither a bondsman nor a lord can be considered as fully self-conscious. A person who has already achieved self-consciousness could be enslaved, so self-consciousness must be considered not as an individual achievement, or an achievement of natural and genetic evolution, but as a social phenomenon.

As philosopher Robert Brandom explains:

Hegel's discussion of the dialectic of the Master and Slave is an attempt to show that asymmetric recognitive relations are metaphysically defective, that the norms they institute aren't the right kind to help us think and act with—to make it possible for us to think and act. Asymmetric recognition in this way is authority without responsibility, on the side of the Master, and responsibility without authority, on the side of the Slave. And Hegel's argument is that unless authority and responsibility are commensurate and reciprocal, no actual normative statuses are instituted. This is one of his most important and certainly one of his deepest ideas, though it's not so easy to see just how the argument works.

Alexandre Kojève's unique interpretation differs from this. His reading of the lord-bondsman dialectic substituted Hegel's epistemological figures with anthropological subjects to explain how history is defined by the struggle between masters and slaves. For Kojève, people are born and history began with the first struggle, which ended with the first masters and slaves. A person is always either master or slave; and there are no real humans where there are no masters and slaves. Prior to this struggle, he maintained that the two forces are in animal state or what Hegel called as natural existence but only the slave would remain in the animal state afterwards. Kojève argued that, in order to end this interaction, both must be dialectically overcome. For the slave, it requires revolutionary transformation or the negation of the world as it is given. In the process, he does not only transform himself but also the world by creating new conditions. History comes to an end when the difference between master and slave ends, when the master ceases to be master because there are no more slaves and the slave ceases to be a slave because there are no more masters. A synthesis takes place between master and slave: the integral citizen of the universal and homogenous state created by Napoleon.

== Influence ==
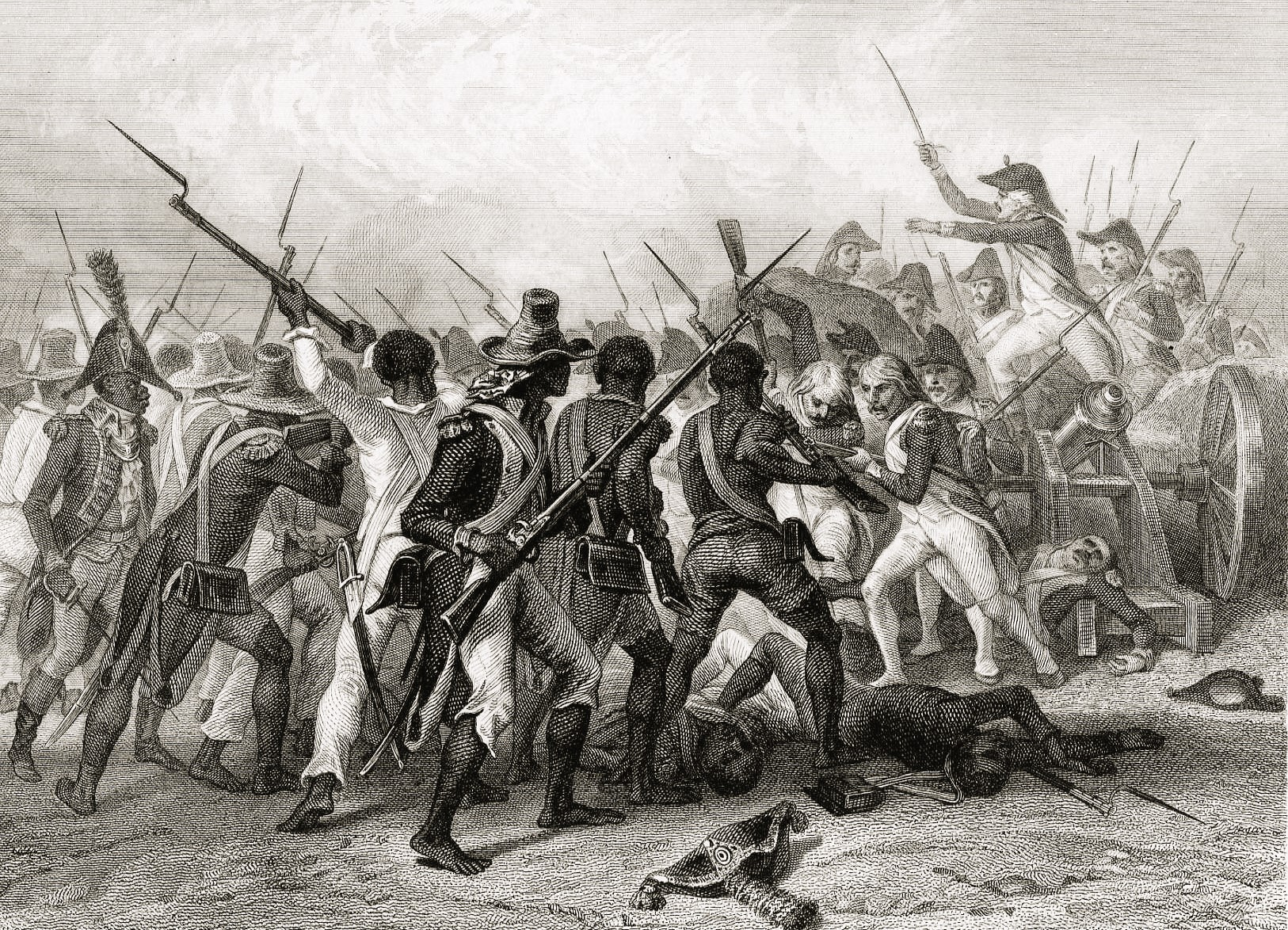
According to Susan Buck-Morss in Hegel, Haiti, and Universal History (2009), Hegel was influenced by articles about the Haitian Revolution in Minerva.

The lord–bondsman relationship influenced numerous discussions and ideas in the 20th century, especially because of its connection to Karl Marx's conception of class struggle as the motive force of social development.

Hegel's lord–bondsman dialectic has been influential in the social sciences, philosophy, literary studies, critical theory, postcolonial studies, and in psychoanalysis. Furthermore, Hegel's lord–bondsman trope, and particularly the emphasis on recognition, has been of crucial influence on Martin Buber's relational schema in I and Thou, Simone de Beauvoir's account of the history and dynamics of gender relations in The Second Sex, and Frantz Fanon's description of the colonial relation in Black Skin, White Masks. Susan Buck-Morss's article Hegel and Haiti argues that the Haitian Revolution influenced Hegel's writing of his lord–bondsman dialectic.

== See also ==
- Discourse of the Master (Jacques Lacan)
- Hegelianism and Young Hegelians
- Recognition justice
