= The Phenomenology of Spirit =

1807 book by Georg Wilhelm Friedrich Hegel

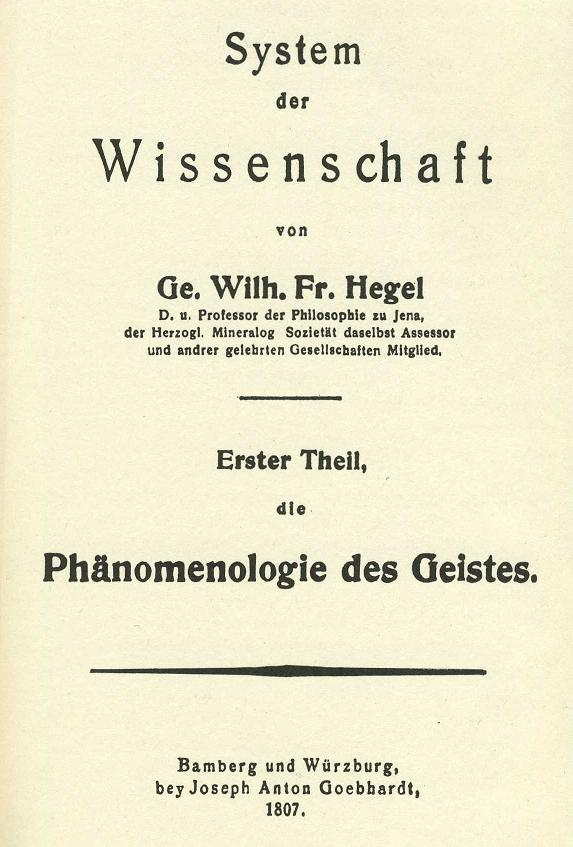
- Title page of the first edition
- Author: Georg Wilhelm Friedrich Hegel
- Original title: Phänomenologie des Geistes
- Language: German
- Subject: German idealism
- Published: 1807
- Publisher: Joseph Anton Goebhardt
- Publication place: Bamberg and Würzburg, Germany
- Original text: Phänomenologie des Geistes at Project Gutenberg
- Translation: The Phenomenology of Spirit at Wikisource

The Phenomenology of Spirit (German: Phänomenologie des Geistes) is an 1807 book by the German philosopher Georg Wilhelm Friedrich Hegel. It is Hegel's first major work and is considered one of the most important and difficult works of German idealism. The book describes a "biography of Spirit" in which consciousness develops from its most basic forms of sensory experience to the highest form of self-knowledge, which Hegel terms "absolute knowing". The book's central argument is that human beings achieve freedom through a process of retrospective self-understanding.

Originally intended as the introduction to Hegel's larger philosophical system, the Phenomenology grew into a substantial work in its own right. Its central purpose is to serve as a "ladder" that guides the reader from the standpoint of "natural consciousness" to the standpoint of philosophical science. In its extensive Preface, Hegel critiques prior philosophical methods—such as mathematical formalism and romantic intuitionism—arguing that truth is not a static proposition but a dynamic, self-developing whole. The book follows a dialectical method, tracing the journey of consciousness through a series of stages or "shapes of consciousness". Each stage is examined through a process of immanent critique, whereby consciousness discovers internal contradictions in its own view of the world, compelling it to move to a new, more sophisticated stage that attempts to resolve these contradictions. The narrative progresses through stages identified as Consciousness, Self-Consciousness, Reason, Spirit, Religion, and finally, Absolute Knowing.

The book was written during a period of historical upheaval, and its composition was famously concluded as Napoleon's army entered the city of Jena in 1806. It contains Hegel's first major public break with his former mentor Friedrich Wilhelm Joseph Schelling and establishes his own distinctive philosophical position. Key themes explored in the work include the dialectical relationship between the universal and the individual, the concept of recognition (Anerkennung), lordship and bondage, and alienation (Entfremdung).

Though its initial reception was muted, The Phenomenology of Spirit has become Hegel's most influential work. It was a foundational text for the Young Hegelians, including Karl Marx, and became a cornerstone of 20th-century continental philosophy, particularly through the influential interpretations of Alexandre Kojève and Jean Hyppolite in France, which shaped the development of existentialism, critical theory, and post-structuralism. In contemporary philosophy, it continues to be a central text for debates on epistemology, pragmatism, and social theory.

== Background and context ==
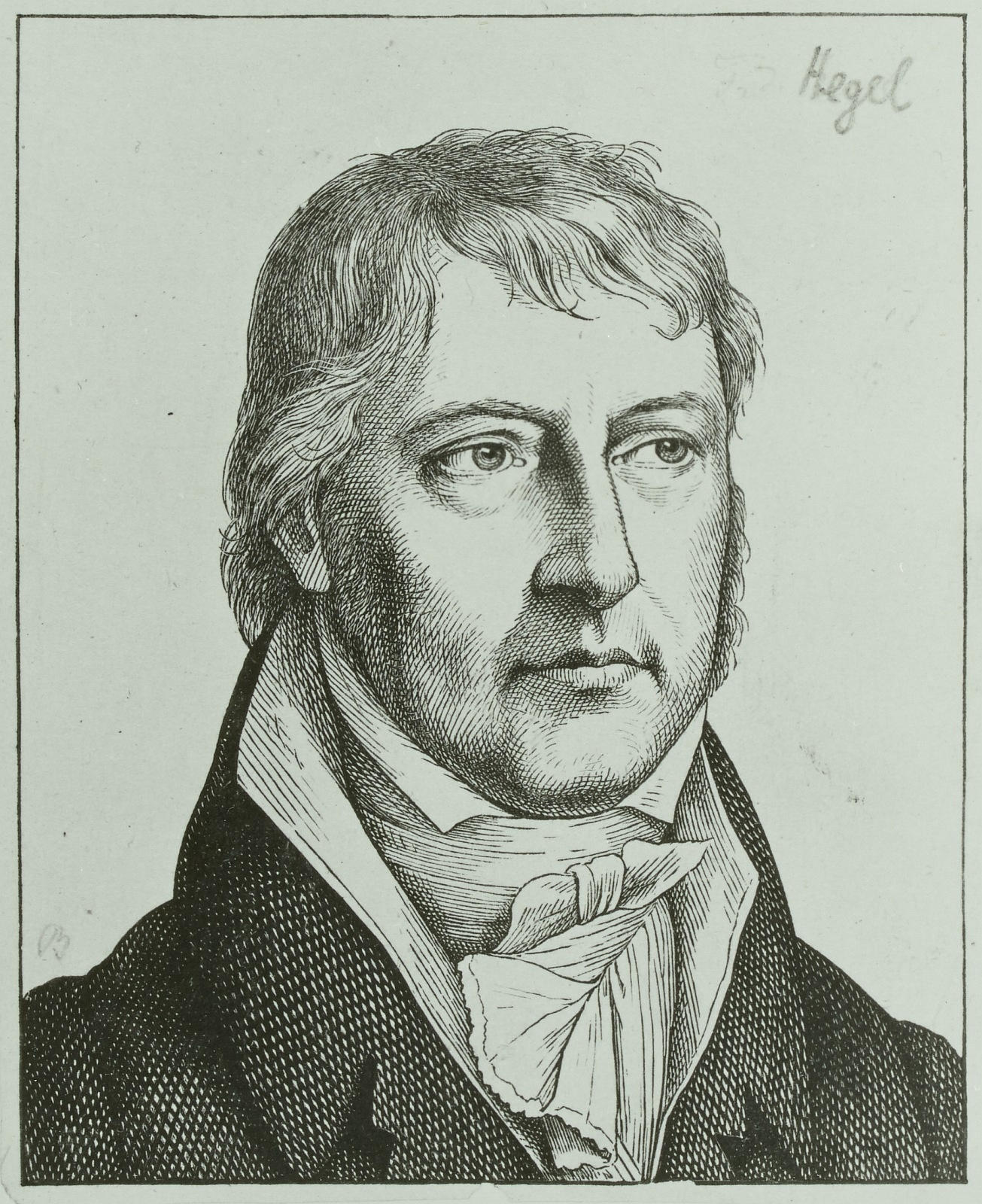
Georg Wilhelm Friedrich Hegel

The Phenomenology of Spirit was written during a time of significant political, cultural, and philosophical upheaval in Europe. Georg Wilhelm Friedrich Hegel (1770–1831) witnessed the French Revolution, the rise and fall of Napoleon, and the dissolution of the Holy Roman Empire, events which profoundly shaped his philosophical engagement with modernity, freedom, and history. As a student at the Tübingen seminary in the early 1790s, Hegel and his friends, the future philosopher Friedrich Wilhelm Joseph Schelling and poet Friedrich Hölderlin, were enthusiastic supporters of the French Revolution and saw their task as assisting in "the birth of a new and better world".

Philosophically, Hegel was a major figure in the movement of German idealism, which sought to move beyond the "critical philosophy" of Immanuel Kant. Kant's successors, including Johann Gottlieb Fichte and Schelling, felt that his system had left philosophy with an untenable dualism between the autonomous subject and the natural world, and between freedom and determinism. For the idealists, Kant was the foremost theorist of human freedom, but they argued that his conception of a free agent as purely rational and independent of its natural and social context was abstract and unappealing. Influenced by Romanticism, the early idealists sought a vision of a "spiritualized community" that would reconcile Kantian freedom with the shared cultural life of art and poetry, often looking to the model of ancient Greece. Hegel took over from Fichte and the young Schelling the idea of presenting a genetic "history of self-consciousness", which traced its development from its beginnings towards self-reflection and insight into its original identity with the world.

The publication of the Phenomenology in 1807 marked a watershed in Hegel's intellectual development and career. Hegel had joined Schelling at the University of Jena in 1801 as a Privatdozent (unsalaried lecturer) and co-edited the Critical Journal of Philosophy, in which he appeared to identify himself as a follower of Schelling's "identity philosophy". After Schelling left Jena in 1803, Hegel began to develop a more independent position, a process that culminated in the Phenomenology, the fruit of his six-year stay at the university. Hegel, now in his mid-thirties, felt a pressing need to produce a major work of his own to establish his academic reputation. The Preface to the book contains a thinly veiled and pungent critique of Schelling's philosophy, which Hegel dismisses as a "monochromatic formalism" that reduces all things to an undifferentiated Absolute, "the night in which ... all cows are black". This direct and mocking critique created a permanent rift between the two philosophers and effectively ended their friendship.

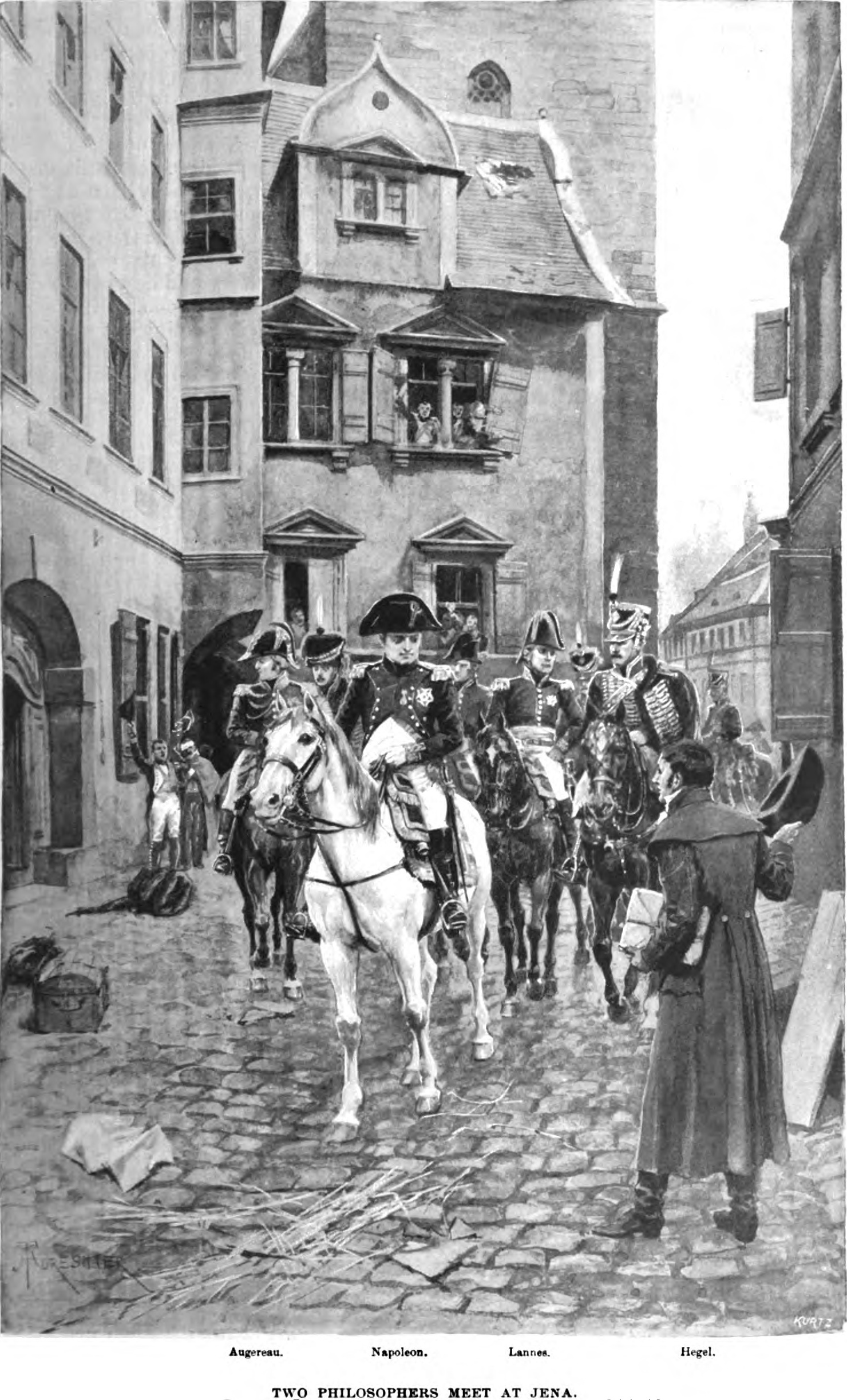
Depiction of Hegel witnessing Napoleon riding through Jena on the day before the Battle of Jena–Auerstedt in 1806

The book was composed under considerable pressure. Hegel was forced to finish the manuscript in great haste to meet a deadline in October 1806, promised to his publisher by his friend Friedrich Immanuel Niethammer. As he was rushing to complete it, Napoleon's forces engaged the Prussian army at the Battle of Jena-Auerstedt. Hegel finished the main body of the text the night before the battle, and the manuscript had to be sent to the publisher in Bamberg through French lines. Although Hegel himself later expressed dissatisfaction with the work's "unconsidered and ungoverned quality" stemming from its hasty composition, it is considered the first of his mature works and lays out the distinctive "Hegelian" approach to a wide range of issues that he would continue to defend in his later publications.

== Purpose and method ==
=== Role in Hegel's system ===
Hegel intended the Phenomenology to serve as an introduction to his philosophical system. More specifically, it is a defence of his system for those who do not accept its premises, tracing the path from "non-philosophical to philosophical thinking". His wider philosophical project, later articulated in his Encyclopedia of the Philosophical Sciences, aimed to demonstrate that the world is fundamentally rational and that human inquiry can achieve a fully adequate comprehension of reality, a state Hegel calls "absolute knowledge". For Hegel, the world is rational in the sense that it can provide deep intellectual and practical satisfaction; it is not inherently at odds with our purposes and interests, and contains nothing that is truly incomprehensible or contradictory. When we see the world in this way, we can feel "at home" in it.

A central problem of modern philosophy, for Hegel, is the problem of justification: how can any standards of belief or conduct be justified, now that traditional authorities like God or nature no longer serve as unquestioned foundations? Hegel's solution is to connect the nature of rational justification to the nature of human freedom. Hegel believed that our failure to see the world as rational stems from our tendency to think in a "one-sided" or oppositional way, adhering to rigid conceptual dichotomies such as finite/infinite, individual/universal, freedom/necessity, and human/divine. He characterizes this mode of thought as the "understanding" (Verstand). Hegel's solution is a method of "dialectical" or "speculative" thinking (Vernunft) that overcomes these oppositions by showing them to be false dichotomies and integrating elements from both sides.

Diagram illustrating Hegel's system. The Phenomenology of Spirit serves as a "ladder" to his philosophy of logic, developed in his Science of Logic and Encyclopedia of the Philosophical Sciences

The Phenomenology serves as a "ladder" to this speculative standpoint. It is necessary because "natural consciousness"—consciousness bound by its given historical and cultural situation—would not immediately see the need for this kind of "conceptual therapy", nor would it know how to undertake it. The book therefore has both a motivational and a pedagogical purpose. It aims to motivate the reader by showing, through a series of case studies, how the non-dialectical thinking of the understanding consistently leads to apparently intractable problems and contradictions. It is pedagogical in that it gradually accustoms the reader to question these "familiar ideas" and prepares them for the more abstract conceptual work of his later system, particularly the Science of Logic, for which the Phenomenology acts as a "deduction". As an "intelligible form of science", it provides an "open road" for the unscientific mind to enter the domain of science.

=== Immanent critique ===
In the Introduction to the Phenomenology, Hegel rejects the philosophical starting point, common to thinkers like John Locke and Kant, that one must first examine the nature and limits of our cognitive faculties (our "instrument" for knowing) before attempting to know reality. Hegel argues that this "natural assumption" inevitably leads to scepticism, as it posits a gap between our cognition and reality from the outset. Furthermore, the very act of examining knowledge is itself an act of knowing, so "to seek to know before we can know" is as absurd as refusing to venture into the water until one has learned how to swim.

Hegel's alternative is the method of immanent critique, which he also calls the "method of skepticism". It addresses the classical skeptical "dilemma of the criterion" posed by Sextus Empiricus: how can a criterion of knowledge be established without either begging the question or leading to an infinite regress? Hegel's solution is to examine a series of "forms of consciousness", each of which adopts a distinct set of assumptions about what knowledge is and applies them to its own putative examples. Instead of applying an external standard to judge consciousness, the investigation simply observes consciousness as it examines itself. Consciousness provides its own criterion for truth, and the investigation becomes a "comparison of consciousness with itself". Each "shape of consciousness" that is examined makes a claim to know the world as it is. In the course of its experience, it discovers a mismatch between its knowledge and the object itself. This contradiction, however, arises not from the object but from the inadequacy of the conceptual framework consciousness is using. Realising this inadequacy, consciousness is compelled to move to a new, more sophisticated "shape" that attempts to resolve the contradiction of the previous stage.

This process is a "pathway of despair" for natural consciousness, as it repeatedly finds its cherished certainties undermined. The progression is narrated from two points of view: that of the experiencing consciousness itself, and that of the "phenomenological observer" (Hegel and the reader), who can see the dialectical logic driving the transitions that remain "behind the back of consciousness". The journey is not merely destructive, however. For Hegel, the subject's essential nature is to deny itself and then to retrospectively understand the error of its ways. The process of skeptical doubt is therefore productive of subjectivity itself. At the end of the journey, consciousness has come to a form of "retrospective self-knowledge", understanding that the problems it encountered were the result of its own "one-sided" conceptual limitations. It is then ready to abandon the perspective of natural consciousness and undertake the "Science of pure thinking" found in the Logic.

=== The Preface and the critique of pseudo-philosophy ===
The unusually long Preface to the Phenomenology operates as a critique of what the scholar Andrew Alexander Davis terms "pseudo-philosophy"—methodological tendencies that appear philosophical but ultimately obstruct genuine conceptual inquiry. Hegel famously begins the work by questioning the very utility of a preface, arguing that philosophy cannot be adequately summarized or explained from the outside through prefatory statements of intent or results. Instead of offering an external "explanation" (Erklärung), Hegel insists that philosophy must be an immersive "presentation" (Darstellung) in which the conceptual content is allowed to develop organically from within.

Throughout the Preface, Hegel dismantles various contemporary approaches to truth. He criticizes the romantic longing for "edification" (Erbaulichkeit) and immediate feeling, which seeks to grasp the Absolute through intuition and sentiment rather than rigorous conceptual labor. He also attacks "formalism"—the practice of imposing external, pre-established schemas onto diverse content—a critique directed largely at the followers of Schelling's Naturphilosophie and Kant's rigid categorizations. Furthermore, Hegel rejects the mathematical and geometrical methods favoured by early modern thinkers like René Descartes and Baruch Spinoza. For Hegel, mathematical truths deal with abstract magnitudes and arbitrary constructions, rendering them incapable of grasping the self-moving, teleological nature of living and spiritual reality.

To capture this dynamic reality, Hegel introduces the concept of the "speculative proposition". He argues that ordinary subject-predicate sentences (for example, "God is eternal") falsely present the subject as a static, fixed container to which predicates are merely attached. In speculative philosophical thinking, the proposition's subject is instead destabilized and set into motion by the predicate, demanding that the reader engage with the sentence not as an atomic unit of truth, but as a moment in a fluid, developing whole. Truth, therefore, cannot be reduced to individual propositions; rather, "the true is the whole", which Hegel vividly describes as a "bacchanalian whirl in which no member is not drunk", where the collapse of each one-sided claim contributes to the transparent calm of the entire system.

== Contents ==
The Phenomenology traces the development of consciousness through a series of stages, organised into major sections. The first three sections—Consciousness, Self-Consciousness, and Reason—focus on what Hegel calls "shapes merely of consciousness", which are primarily individual standpoints. The later sections—Spirit, Religion, and Absolute Knowing—move to what Hegel calls "shapes of a world", which are collective social and historical formations. The wide range of subject matter discussed—including Greek tragedy, court culture, phrenology, Kantian ethics, and sundry religious beliefs—has led some commentators to view the work as an unsystematic collection of disparate analyses. However, a central interpretive claim of the Phenomenology is that these diverse "shapes" are not arbitrary but are connected by an inner dialectical logic and form a systematic whole.

=== A. Consciousness ===
The book begins by examining the most basic forms of consciousness of an object. The central theme of this section is the dialectic between the individuality of the object and the universality of the concepts used to know it.

- Sense-certainty: Consciousness first attempts to apprehend reality through immediate sense experience, claiming the "richest" and "truest" knowledge of a particular 'This', 'Here', and 'Now'. Hegel argues that this attempt to grasp the pure individual fails, because any attempt to say what 'this' is relies on universal terms that transcend its immediacy. The 'Here' can be a tree or a house; the 'Now' can be day or night. Sense-certainty thus discovers that its truth is not the particular individual but the most abstract universal.

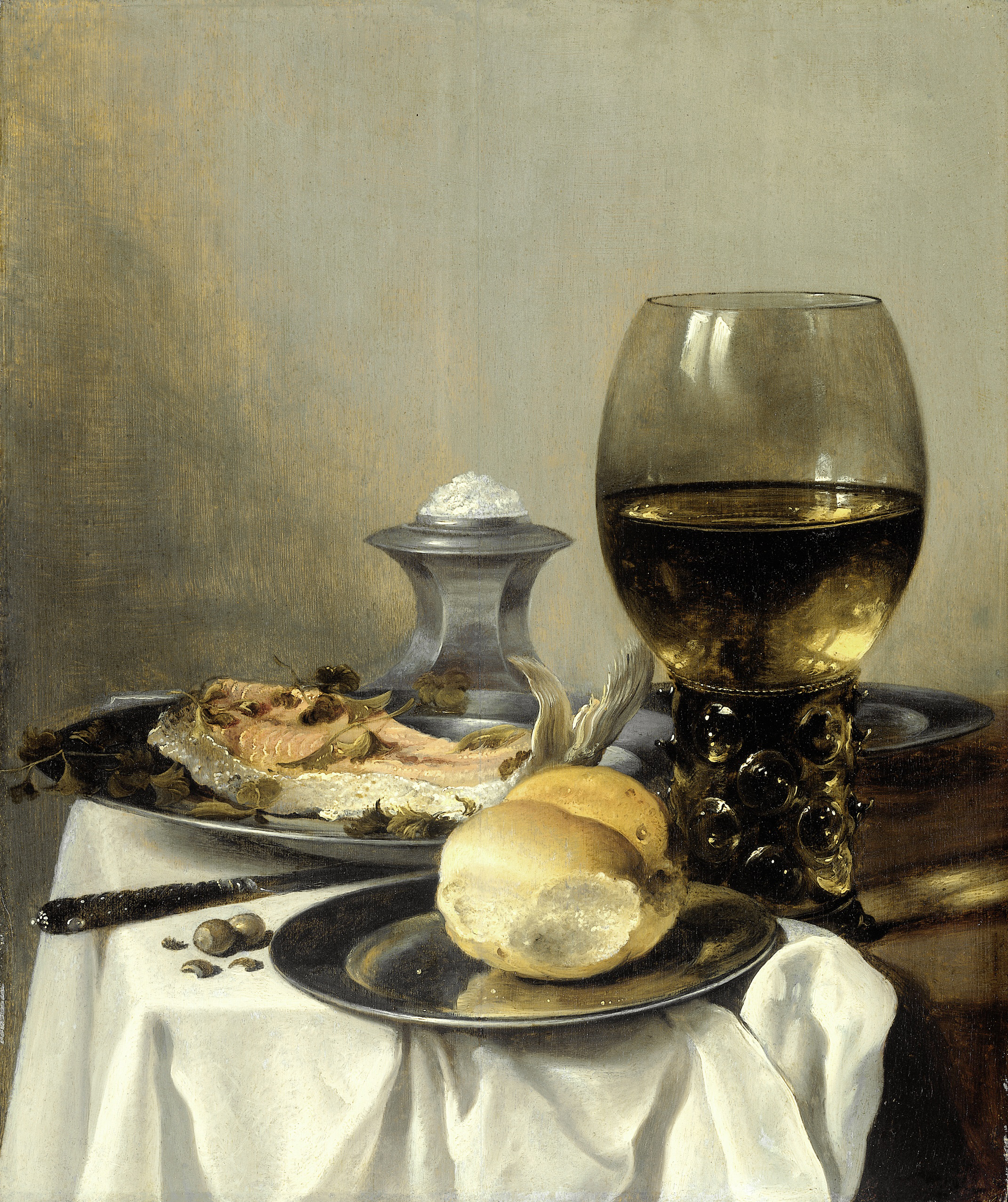
Still Life with Salt Tub (c. 1644) by Pieter Claesz

- Perception: Moving beyond immediate sensation, consciousness now perceives the object as a 'Thing' with multiple 'Properties'. This standpoint, however, becomes caught in a contradiction. It sees the object both as a unified 'One' (a single thing) and as a diverse collection or 'Also' of many independent properties (e.g., this salt is white, and also tart, and also cubical). Consciousness oscillates between these two ways of seeing the object, unable to reconcile its unity and its multiplicity.
- Force and the Understanding: To resolve the contradictions of perception, consciousness posits a supersensible 'inner' world of Force and universal laws that explains the 'outer' world of appearances. This is the standpoint of the scientific Understanding. However, this creates a new dualism between the world as it appears to us and an unknowable reality "beyond". This dualism culminates in the notion of an "inverted world", where everything in the inner world is the opposite of what it is in the phenomenal world. Hegel argues that this supersensible world is not an insight into reality, but a product of dissatisfaction with the apparent world, which the theorist is driven to "invert". The process of theoretical explanation is thus driven by the practical interests of human subjects. Having failed to find satisfaction in knowing the object, consciousness turns inward to know itself.

=== B. Self-Consciousness ===
In this section, consciousness becomes its own object. The focus shifts from a theoretical to a practical relationship with the world, as self-consciousness seeks to affirm its own existence and freedom.

- Desire: The first form of self-consciousness is Desire, which seeks to affirm itself by negating or consuming objects. This proves self-defeating, as the satisfaction of desire requires the destruction of the very object on which its satisfaction depends, leading to an endless cycle of new desires.

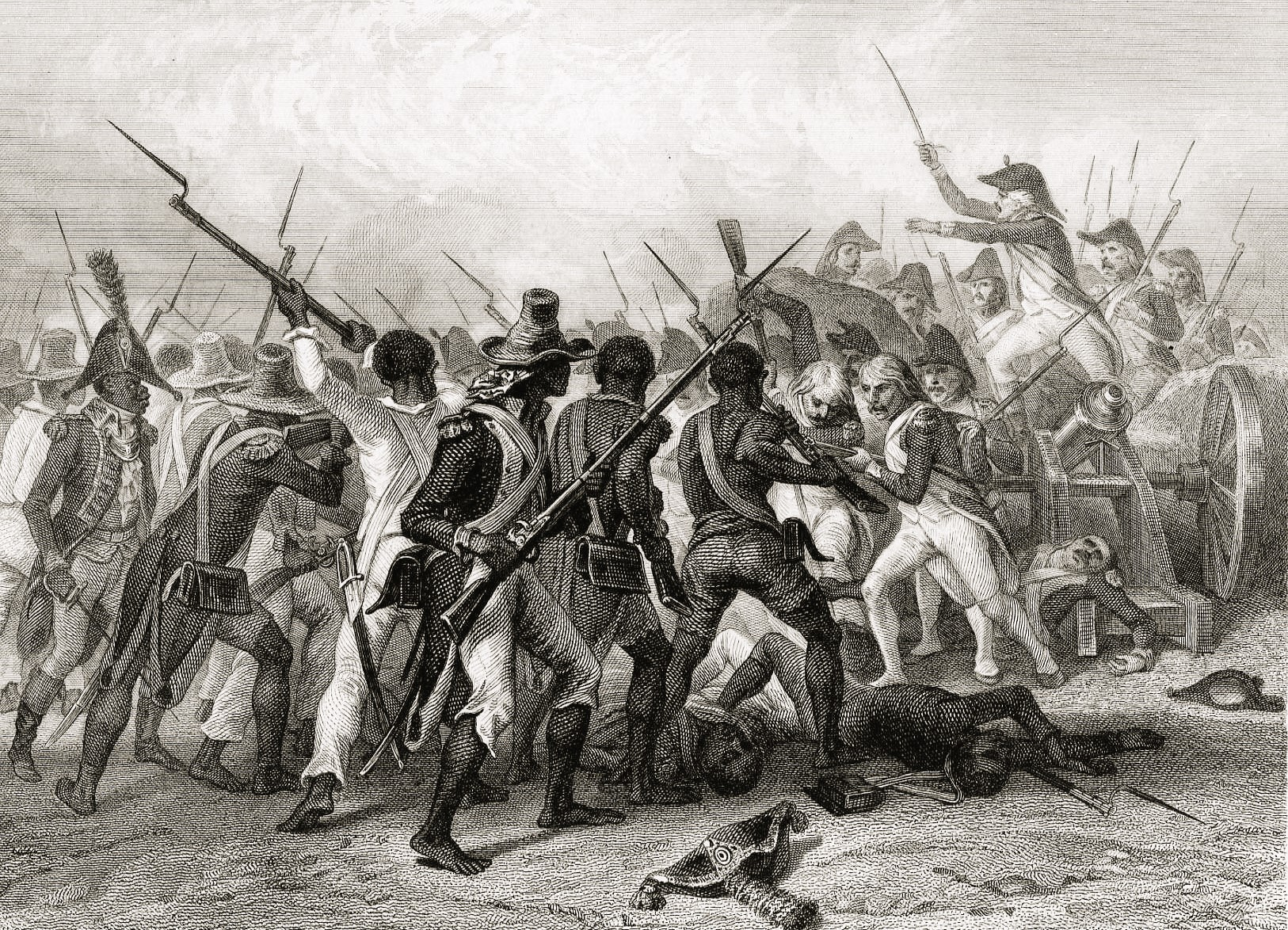
Depiction of a battle during the Haitian Revolution

- Lordship and Bondage: Self-consciousness realizes it can only achieve satisfaction through another self-consciousness. This leads to a life-and-death struggle between two self-consciousnesses, each seeking recognition (Anerkennung) from the other without reciprocating. The struggle is resolved when one individual succumbs to the fear of death and submits to the other, becoming the bondsman (or slave), while the victor becomes the lord (or master). Hegel argues that this relationship is also a dead end. The lord receives recognition only from a subordinate he does not recognise as an equal, making the recognition empty. The bondsman, however, through the discipline of work for the master and the transformative experience of the fear of death, achieves a more genuine self-consciousness. In shaping objects through work, the bondsman finds his own consciousness reflected in the world. Hegel's argument is that any project of action implicitly makes a normative claim that what one is doing is rational. This claim to rationality can only be satisfied through recognition from an idealized community of other rational agents. If one takes any external good as the supreme object of desire, it inevitably leads either to a Hobbesian state of war or to the arbitrary and non-rational relationship of master and slave. The only way to avoid this practical incoherence is to value freedom itself as the supreme good.

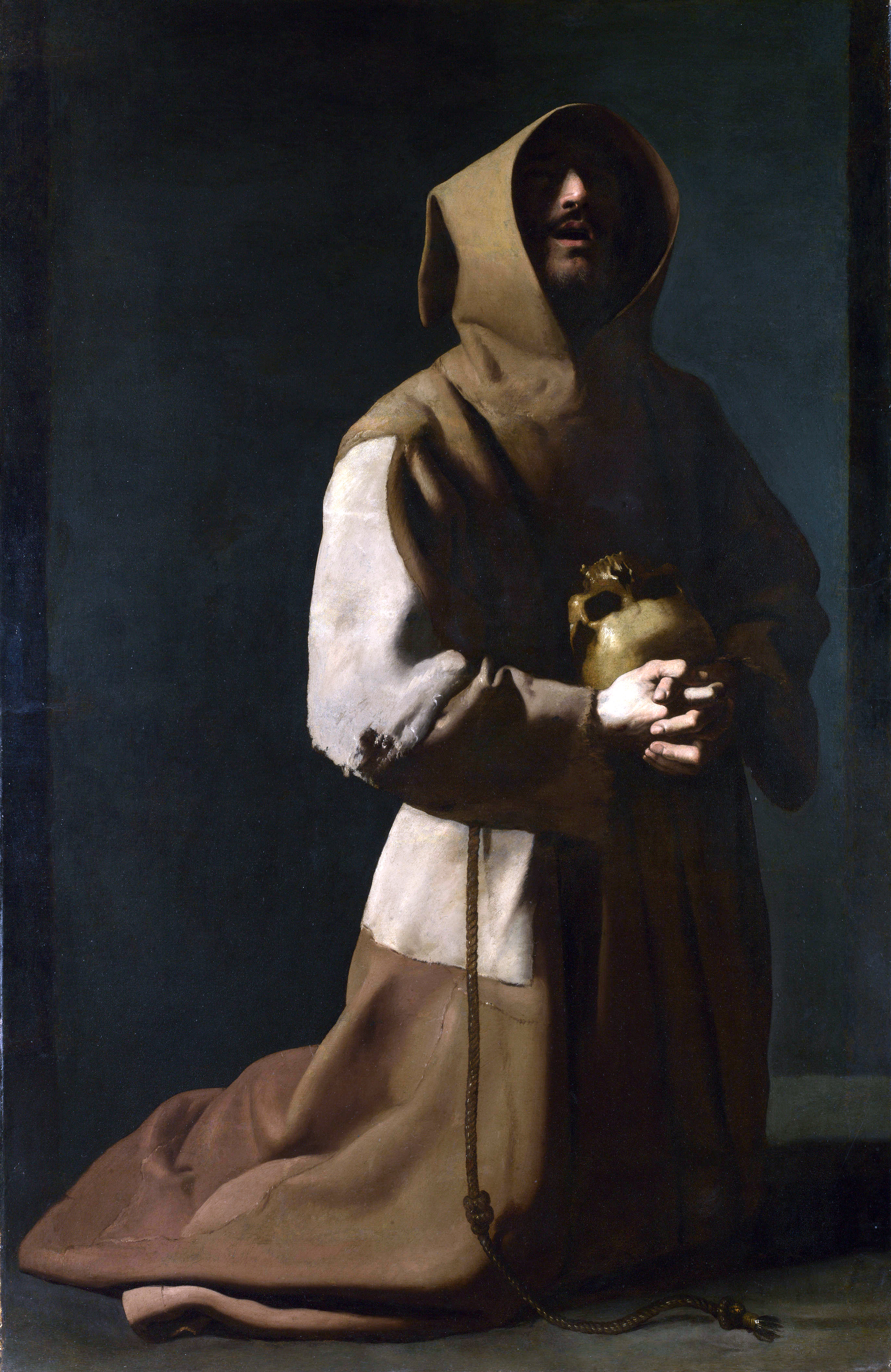
Saint Francis in Meditation (1635–1639) by Francisco de Zurbarán

- Stoicism, Scepticism, and the Unhappy Consciousness: The freedom achieved by the bondsman is initially an abstract inner freedom, the freedom of thought found in Stoicism. The Stoic retreats from the world into the "simple essentiality of thought". This withdrawal leads to Scepticism, which negates the reality of the external world altogether. Scepticism, however, is internally contradictory, as the sceptic must live in the very world whose reality he denies. This contradiction gives rise to the Unhappy Consciousness, a consciousness divided within itself. It experiences a split between its own changeable, finite self and an unchangeable, infinite 'Beyond' (God), from which it feels estranged. This stage represents the religious consciousness of the medieval world, which attempts and fails to bridge this gap through devotion, work, and asceticism.

=== C. (AA.) Reason ===
The Unhappy Consciousness's yearning for unity with the absolute leads it to a new standpoint: Reason, which is the "certainty that it is all reality". This section explores various forms of rationalism.

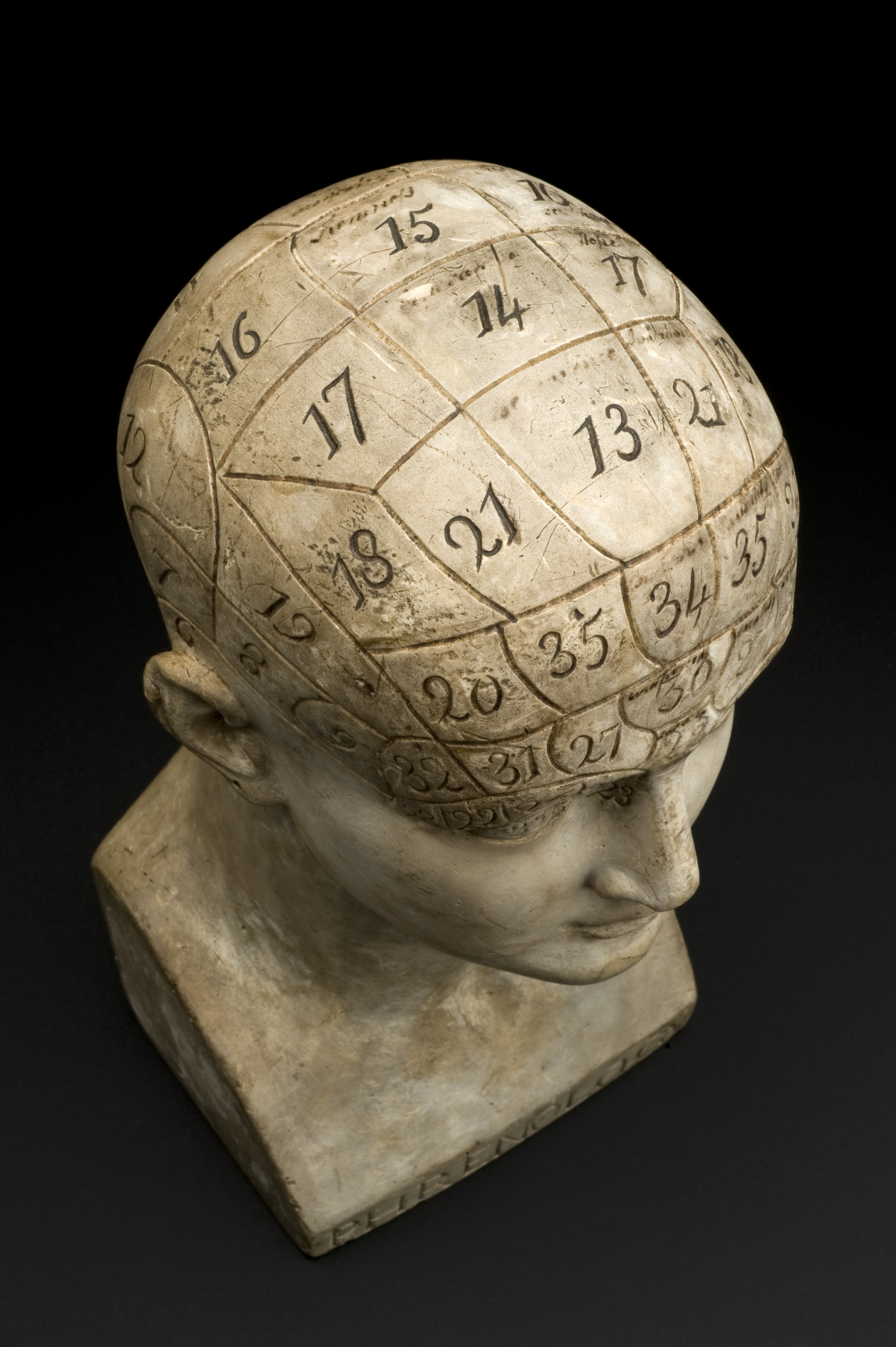
Numbered phrenology bust

- Observing Reason: Reason first seeks to find itself in the world through observation, attempting to discover rational laws in nature and in human life. However, its attempts to classify natural organisms and to discover psychological laws governing human behaviour fail. It gets lost in endless detail and cannot grasp the teleological nature of organisms or the freedom of the individual. Its inquiry into the relationship between mind and body through the pseudo-sciences of physiognomy and phrenology ends in absurdity.
- Active Reason: Disappointed with observation, Reason turns to action to shape the world according to its own purposes. It first seeks individual happiness through pleasure, but finds this leads to a sense of fatalistic necessity. It then tries to act for the good of all according to the law of the heart, but this degenerates into a "frenzy of self-conceit" when others do not accept its vision. Finally, it takes up the cause of virtue against the 'way of the world', but finds itself shadow-boxing with an empty abstraction of 'the good'.
- Individuality Which Takes Itself To Be Real In And For Itself: Reason seeks to ground its action in universal principles. At first, it asserts that each individual's "works" are a valid expression of their self. This leads to the "spiritual animal kingdom," a state of cynical hypocrisy where every action is seen as mere self-promotion. Consciousness then turns to morality and the search for binding laws. Hegel critiques the Kantian procedure of testing maxims through the categorical imperative, arguing that this formal test is either empty or presupposes the ethical content it is meant to generate. This failure of modern individualistic reason leads consciousness to seek its foundations in the concrete ethical life of a community.

=== C. (BB.) Spirit ===
Spirit (Geist) is Reason that exists in the actual world as a shared ethical and social life. Consciousness turns from the failures of modern individualism to examine the "happy state" of ancient Greece, where the individual was fully integrated into the substance of their community (the polis).

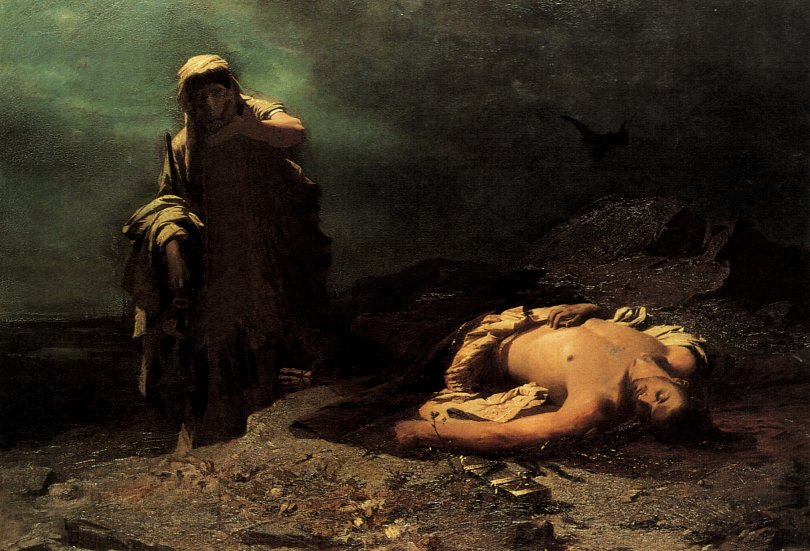
Antigone and Polynices (1865) by Lytras Nikephoros

- True Spirit. The Ethical Order: In the Greek world, there was a harmonious balance between human law (the state, represented by men) and divine law (the family, represented by women). Hegel uses Sophocles's tragedy Antigone to show the inherent instability of this world. The conflict between Antigone (who follows the divine law in burying her brother) and Creon (who upholds the human law of the state) reveals a collision between two one-sided ethical claims. The tragedy demonstrates that the Greek world lacked a higher principle to resolve this conflict, because each individual was defined entirely by their social role. Hegel's interpretation has been critiqued for overlooking key aspects of female experience in the play, such as Antigone's conscious choice and moral courage, which transcend his framework of "natural ethical life". The collapse of this ethical order leads to the Roman Empire, where individuals are no longer citizens but abstract "legal persons".

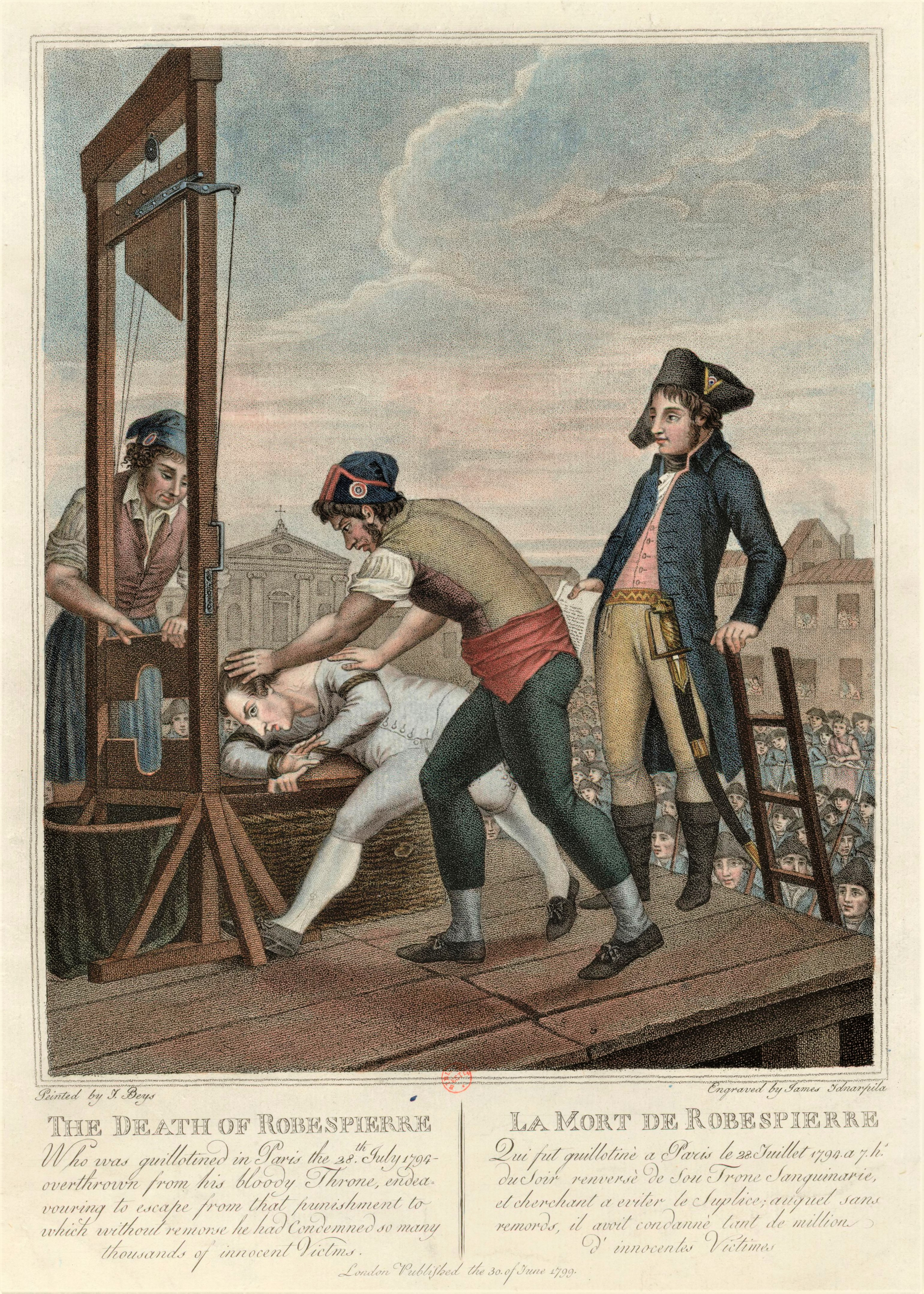
Depiction of the execution of Maximilien Robespierre during the French Revolution

- Self-Alienated Spirit. Culture: This section describes the modern world, which Hegel characterizes by alienation (Entfremdung). The individual is divided from society, nature from culture, and faith from reason. Hegel analyzes the world of Bildung (culture), exemplified by the court society of pre-revolutionary France, where all values become inverted and unstable. This leads to the standpoint of Faith which posits a transcendent beyond, and Enlightenment which critiques faith with the tools of pure reason and utility. The struggle between them culminates in the French Revolution's attempt to realise Absolute Freedom. This project, however, understands freedom as the abstract negation of all particularity and social structure, leading inevitably to the "fury of destruction" of the Reign of Terror.
- Spirit that is Certain of Itself. Morality: The failure of abstract political freedom leads Spirit to turn inward to morality. Hegel analyzes the Kantian moral worldview, which he argues is riddled with "thoughtless contradictions" because of its dualism between duty and inclination, and morality and nature. This gives way to the standpoint of Conscience (Gewissen), which asserts its own immediate certainty as the source of right. This can lead to a withdrawal from action into the purity of the "beautiful soul". The impasse is finally overcome when the "hard-hearted" judging consciousness and the acting consciousness recognise their shared fallibility and offer each other mutual forgiveness. This "word of reconciliation" constitutes the realisation of Spirit as "God manifested in the midst of those who know themselves in the form of pure knowledge".

=== C. (CC.) Religion ===
In the final stages, Spirit grasps the Absolute not in thought but in the form of representation (Vorstellung). Hegel presents the development of religion as the development of Spirit's consciousness of itself. He traces a path from Natural Religion (where the divine is identified with light, plants, or animals), through the Religion of Art (the ethical gods of ancient Greece represented in sculpture, epic, and tragedy), to the Revealed Religion, Christianity. For Hegel, Christianity represents the highest form of religious consciousness because in the doctrine of the Incarnation, it grasps the absolute as Spirit—the unity of the divine and the human. However, religion still apprehends this truth in the non-conceptual form of stories and images, leaving it to philosophy to grasp it in its proper conceptual form.

=== C. (DD.) Absolute Knowing ===
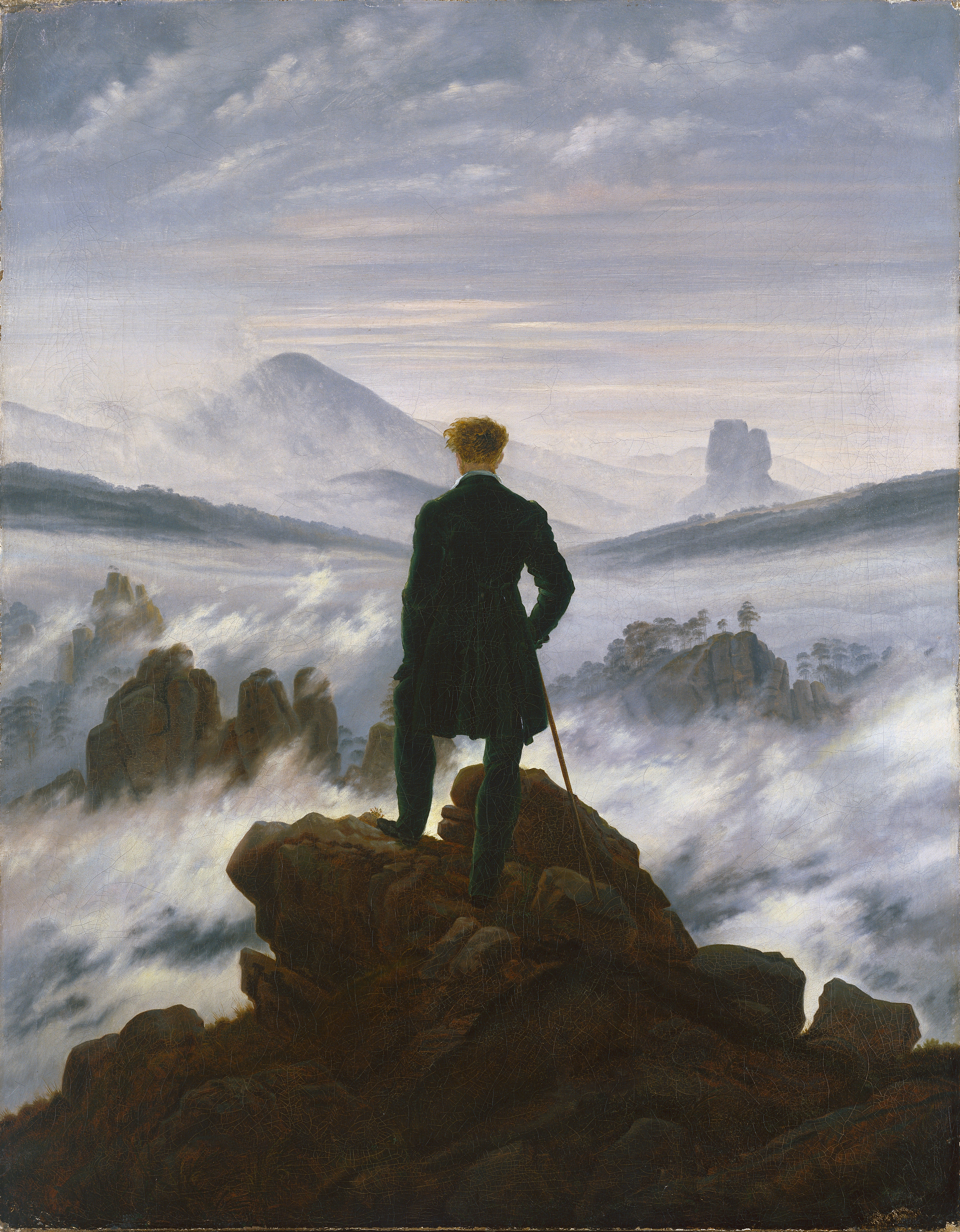
Wanderer above the Sea of Fog (1818) by Caspar David Friedrich

In the final, brief chapter, consciousness reaches the standpoint of Absolute Knowing. This is not knowledge of a transcendent "Absolute" but a form of self-knowledge where consciousness understands its own long journey through the preceding stages. It recognizes that the series of contradictions and oppositions it faced were not inherent in reality but were products of its own limited and one-sided conceptual frameworks. Having grasped the logic of its own development, Spirit is now ready to comprehend its content in its pure conceptual form. The Phenomenology, as the "Science of the experience of consciousness", is complete, and the way is cleared for the Science of Logic.

== Reception and influence ==
The initial reception of the Phenomenology was muted. Readers found it difficult to understand, and its originality was not immediately recognised. During Hegel's lifetime and in the decades following his death, the book was largely eclipsed by his later, more systematic works, especially the Science of Logic and the Encyclopedia of the Philosophical Sciences. The book's fortunes changed with the rise of the Young Hegelians in the 1830s and 1840s. Thinkers like Ludwig Feuerbach and Karl Marx began to see the Phenomenology as a more radical alternative to what they considered the conservative, idealist, and theological system of the later Hegel. Marx, in his Economic and Philosophic Manuscripts of 1844, praised the Phenomenology for grasping the "estrangement of man" and for its critical insights, particularly in the master–slave dialectic, which he reinterpreted in terms of alienated labour.

In the early 20th century, the Phenomenology remained largely neglected in the English-speaking world, but it became the central text for a major Hegel renaissance in France. Jean Wahl's 1929 study focused on the theme of the "Unhappy Consciousness", revealing a more existentialist dimension to Hegel's thought. This was followed by Alexandre Kojève's influential series of lectures in Paris from 1933 to 1939. Kojève's highly original, though idiosyncratic, reading of the Phenomenology through the lens of Marx and Martin Heidegger placed the master-slave dialectic and the theme of desire for recognition at the absolute centre of Hegel's project. Kojève's lectures were attended by a generation of French intellectuals, including Jean-Paul Sartre, Maurice Merleau-Ponty, Georges Bataille, and Jacques Lacan, and his interpretation profoundly shaped the development of French existentialism, post-structuralism, and psychoanalysis. Simultaneously, Jean Hyppolite's translation (1939–41) and detailed commentary (1946) provided a more scholarly but also influential reading that further established the book's importance.

The Phenomenology was also a key text for the tradition of critical theory, from Georg Lukács's early work on alienation in History and Class Consciousness to later work by Jürgen Habermas and Axel Honneth on themes of recognition and sociality. In contemporary Anglophone philosophy, the book has been the subject of renewed interest since the "Hegel renaissance" of the late 20th century. Epistemological readings have focused on its method of immanent critique as a response to scepticism. Pragmatist-influenced interpretations have connected Hegel's arguments, particularly on sense-certainty and social norms, to the work of Wilfrid Sellars and John Dewey. Feminist philosophers have also engaged with the text, particularly its discussion of Antigone and the relationship between gender, family, and the state. The Phenomenology continues to be seen as an enigmatic and multifaceted work, subject to ongoing debate and reinterpretation.

== English translations ==
- G. W. F. Hegel: The Phenomenology of Spirit, translated by Peter Fuss and John Dobbins (University of Notre Dame Press, 2019)
- Georg Wilhelm Friedrich Hegel: The Phenomenology of Spirit (Cambridge Hegel Translations), translated by Terry Pinkard (Cambridge University Press, 2018) ISBN 0-52185579-9
- Hegel: The Phenomenology of Spirit: Translated with introduction and commentary, translated by Michael Inwood (Oxford University Press, 2018) ISBN 0-19879062-7
- Phenomenology of Spirit, translated by A. V. Miller with analysis of the text and foreword by J. N. Findlay (Oxford: Clarendon Press, 1977) ISBN 0-19824597-1
- Phenomenology of Mind, translated by J. B. Baillie (London: Harper & Row, 1967) Baillie (1872-1940) Baillie translation 1910.
- Hegel's Preface to the Phenomenology of Spirit, translated with introduction, running commentary and notes by Yirmiyahu Yovel (Princeton: Princeton University Press, 2004) ISBN 0-69112052-8.
- Texts and Commentary: Hegel's Preface to His System in a New Translation With Commentary on Facing Pages, and "Who Thinks Abstractly?", translated by Walter Kaufmann (South Bend: University of Notre Dame Press, 1977) ISBN 0-26801069-2.
- "Introduction", "The Phenomenology of Spirit", translated by Kenley R. Dove, in Martin Heidegger, "Hegel's Concept of Experience" (New York: Harper & Row, 1970)
- "Sense-Certainty", Chapter I, "The Phenomenology of Spirit", translated by Kenley R. Dove, "The Philosophical Forum", Vol. 32, No 4
- "Stoicism", Chapter IV, B, "The Phenomenology of Spirit", translated by Kenley R. Dove, "The Philosophical Forum", Vol. 37, No 3
- "Absolute Knowing", Chapter VIII, "The Phenomenology of Spirit", translated by Kenley R. Dove, "The Philosophical Forum", Vol. 32, No 4
- Hegel's Phenomenology of Spirit: Selections Translated and Annotated by Howard P. Kainz. The Pennsylvania State University Press. ISBN 0-27101076-2
- Phenomenology of Spirit selections translated by Andrea Tschemplik and James H. Stam, in Steven M. Cahn, ed., Classics of Western Philosophy (Hackett, 2007)
- Hegel's Phenomenology of Self-consciousness: text and commentary [A translation of Chapter IV of the Phenomenology, with accompanying essays and a translation of "Hegel's summary of self-consciousness from 'The Phenomenology of Spirit' in the Philosophical Propaedeutic"], by Leo Rauch and David Sherman. State University of New York Press, 1999.

== See also ==
- Direct and indirect realism
- Process theology
- Sittlichkeit
- Weltgeist
