= Leonard Lawlor =

American philosopher (born 1954)

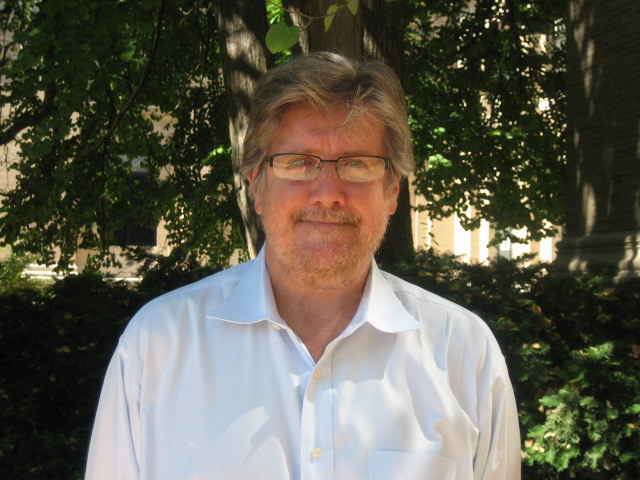
- Born: 2 November 1954 (age 71); Reading, Pennsylvania, U.S.
- Spouse: Jennifer Wagner-Lawlor
- Children: Two

Academic background
- Thesis: Event and iterability: The confrontation between Paul Ricoeur and Jacques Derrida (1988)

Academic work
- Region: Western philosophy
- School or tradition: Continental philosophy
- Institutions: Pennsylvania State University
- Main interests: Metaphysics, epistemology

Leonard "Len" Lawlor (/ˈlɔːlər/; born November 2, 1954) is an American philosopher who is Edwin Erle Sparks Professor of Philosophy at Pennsylvania State University. He specializes in nineteenth- and twentieth-century Continental philosophy.

== Career ==
Lawlor received his doctorate from SUNY Stony Brook in 1988 and taught at the University of Memphis from 1989–2008, where he held the position of Faudree-Hardin University Professor of Philosophy from 2004 to 2008 before joining the faculty at Penn State, as Sparks Professor of Philosophy. He is known for his writings on phenomenology and on the figures Jacques Derrida, Gilles Deleuze, Michel Foucault, Henri Bergson, Maurice Merleau-Ponty, Edmund Husserl, and Jean Hyppolite.

In his 2002 book Derrida and Husserl: The Basic Problem of Phenomenology, Lawlor uses the term 'lifeism' to refer to a unified field within the 20th century continental philosophy of Merleau-Ponty, Derrida, Deleuze, Foucault and Martin Heidegger, that focuses on life and death, involving concepts such as Husserl's Erlebnis and Bergson's Élan vital. In later writings he equated lifeism with "neo-vitalism".

Lawlor's most recent work concerns transcendental violence and possible responses to it. His recent From Violence to Speaking Out takes up the question of responses to violence. Although From Violence to Speaking Out contains precise expositions of important ideas in Derrida, Deleuze, and Foucault, it is an original work of philosophy, extending ideas found in his 2007 This Is Not Sufficient. Somewhat disguised by the expositions, From Violence to Speaking Out is primarily a work in ethics.

== Selected bibliography ==
=== Books authored ===
- From Violence to Speaking out (Edinburgh: Edinburgh University Press, 2016).
- Early Twentieth-Century Continental Philosophy (Bloomington: Indiana University Press, 2011).
- This Is Not Sufficient: An Essay on Animality and Human Nature in Derrida (New York: Columbia University Press, 2007).
- The Implications of Immanence: Towards a New Concept of Life (The Bronx: Fordham University Press, 2006).
- The Challenge of Bergsonism: Phenomenology, Ontology, Ethics (London: Continuum Press, 2003).
- Thinking through French Philosophy: The Being of the Question (Bloomington: Indiana University Press, 2003).
- Derrida and Husserl: The Basic Problem of Phenomenology (Bloomington: Indiana University Press, 2002).
- Imagination and Chance: The Difference between the Thought of Ricoeur and Derrida (Albany: The SUNY Press, 1992).

=== Books edited ===
- Co-editor (with Zeynep Direk) of "The Blackwell Companion to Derrida" (Blackwell, 2014).
- Co-editor (with J. Nale) of "The Cambridge Foucault Lexicon" (Cambridge University Press,2013).
- Editor of "Vol. 4, Phenomenology: Responses and Developments (1930-1960)" in The Acumen History of Continental Philosophy, Ed. Alan Schrift (Durham: Acumen Publishing, 2010).
- Co-editor (with Ted Toadvine) of The Merleau-Ponty Reader (Evanston: Northwestern University Press, 2007).
- Co-editor (with Zeynep Direk) of Derrida: Critical Assessments in three volumes (London: Routledge, 2002).
- Co-editor (with Fred Evans) of Chiasms: Merleau-Ponty's Notion of the Flesh (Albany: The SUNY Press, 2000).
- Editor and primary translator (with Bettina Bergo) of Maurice Merleau-Ponty, Husserl at the Limits of Phenomenology (Evanston: Northwestern University Press, 2002).

=== Works translated ===
- Jacques Derrida's La voix et le phénomène as Voice and Phenomenon (Evanston: Northwestern University Press, 2011).
- Co-translator (with Heath Massey) of Maurice Merleau-Ponty's course notes, 1955-56: L'institution, La passivité, as Institution and Passivity (Evanston: Northwestern University Press, 2010).
- Co-translator (with Ted Toadvine) of Renaud Barbaras's The Being of the Phenomenon: Merleau-Ponty's Ontology (Bloomington: Indiana University Press, 2004).
- Co-translator (with Amit Sen) of Jean Hyppolite's "Logic and Existence" (Albany: The SUNY Press, 1997).

=== Selected articles ===
- "Phenomenology and Metaphysics, and Chaos: On the Fragility of the Event in Deleuze", in The Cambridge Companion to Deleuze, eds. Daniel Smith and Henry Somers-Hall (New York: Cambridge University Press, 2012), pp. 103–125.
- "Neither Violent nor Tranquil", for special issue of the Journal of the British Society for Phenomenology on Foucault, eds. Keith Crome and Patrick O'Connor, 43.1 (January 2012): 6-21.
- "Deconstruction", for the Routledge Companion to Phenomenology, eds. Sebastian Luft and Soren Overgaard (London: Routledge, 2012): pp. 508–517.
- "A Note on the Relation between Étienne Souriau's L'instauration philosophique and Deleuze and Guattari's What is Philosophy?", in Deleuze Studies 5.3 (2011): 400-406.
- "Further Questions: The Way out of the Present Philosophical Situation (Via Foucault)", in the Journal of French and Francophone Philosophy, 19.1 (2011): 91-104.
- "The Postmodern Self: An Essay on Anachronism and Powerlessness", for The Oxford Handbook to the Self, Ed. Shaun Gallagher (Oxford: Oxford University Press, 2011): pp. 696–714.
- "Philosophy and Reality: Reflection on Cora Diamond's Works", in Philosophical Investigations, 34.4 (October 2011): 353-366.
- "Intuition and Duration: An Introduction to Bergson's Introduction to Metaphysics", in Phenomenology and Bergsonism, Ed. Michael Kelly (London: Palgrave-Macmillan, 2010): pp. 25–41.
- "Auto-affection and Becoming (Part I): Who are We?" in Environmental Philosophy, 6.1 (2009): 1-20.
- "Following the Rats: An Essay on the Concept of Becoming-Animal in Deleuze and Guattari", in Sub-Stance, "The Political Animal", Issue 117, Volume 37, Number 3, 2008: 169-187.
- "Waiting and Lateness: The Context, Implications, and Basic Argumentation of Derrida's 'Awaiting (at) the Arrival' (S'attendre à l'arrivée) in Aporias", in Research in Phenomenology, 38.3 (2008): 329-403.
- "Animals have no Hand: An Essay on Animality in Derrida", The New Centennial Review, 7.2 (memorial issue on Derrida, September/October 2007): 43-70.
- "Life: an Essay on the Overcoming of Metaphysics", in Edinburgh University Press Companion to Twentieth Century Philosophies, Ed., Constantine Boundas (Edinburgh: Edinburgh University Press, 2007): 517-530.
- "Phenomenology: the Way out of Subjectivism", in Edinburgh University Press Companion to Twentieth Century Philosophies, Ed., Constantine Boundas (Edinburgh: Edinburgh University Press, 2007): 389-401.
- "'For the Creation Waits with Eager Longing for the Revelation': From the Deconstruction of Metaphysics to the Deconstruction of Christianity in Derrida", Epoche, 10.2 (Spring 2006): 359-377.
- "Bergson Revisited", in Symposium, 10.1, (Spring 2006, special issue on Deleuze, edited by Constantine Boundas): 35-52.
- "Jacques Derrida" in The Stanford Encyclopedia of Philosophy (on-line), 2006.
- "Henri Bergson" (co-authored with Valentine Moulard) in The Stanford Encyclopedia of Philosophy (on-line), 2004.

== See also ==
List of deconstructionists
