= Tropes of Transport =

Tropes of Transport: Hegel and Emotion
- Author: Katrin Pahl
- Language: English
- Genre: Nonfiction
- Published: 2012
- Publisher: Northwestern University Press
- Publication place: United States
- Media type: Print
- Pages: 296
- ISBN: 0810127857

Tropes of Transport: Hegel and Emotion is a book 2012 by Katrin Pahl. The book explores and analyzes the literary texts of The Phenomenology of Spirit by Georg Wilhelm Friedrich Hegel.
