= Arnold V. Miller =

Translator of works of G.W.F Hegel

Arnold Vincent Miller aka. A.V. Miller (October 1, 1899 – 19 March 1991) was a well-known translator of Hegel's Phenomenology of Spirit and Science of Logic into English.

== Life and works ==
Miller was born on October 1, 1899, in London into a middle class family. He graduated from Hilldrop Road Secondary School in 1916. In 1917 he joined the British Army.

=== Translation of the Phenomenology ===
Miller's 1977 translation of The Phenomenology of Spirit, featured a foreword as well as a line-by-line commentary of the text by J. N. Findlay. At a time of renewal of interest in Hegel, It was a much needed improvement over the notorious shortcomings of the 1910 (revised in 1931) translation by J. B. Baillie. Miller introduced independent paragraph numbering in his translation for the first time, which does not exist in the original German, but has proven to be useful for discussions and references throughout the years. Subsequent translators, such as Terry Pinkard and Michael Inwood have retained this numeration in their works with minor alterations. According to Stephan Houlgate, Miller's translation provides many memorable passages, some of which reflect Hegel's own striking style, and some of which obscure Hegel's meaning.

=== Translations ===
- Science of Logic (1 ed.). Routledge. 2014-06-11. doi:10.4324/9781315823546. ISBN 978-1-315-82354-6.
- Phenomenology of Spirit. Oxford University Press. 1977. ISBN 978-0-19-824597-1.
- The Philosophical Propaedeutic. B. Blackwell. 1986. ISBN 978-0-631-15013-8.
- Introduction to the Lectures on the History of Philosophy. Clarendon Press. 1987. ISBN 978-0-19-824991-7.
- Miller, A. V.; Findlay, J. N., eds. (2004). Hegel's Philosophy of Nature. Oxford University Press. doi:10.1093/actrade/9780199272679.book.1. ISBN 978-0-19-927267-9.
- Wallace, William; Miller, A. V.; Inwood, Michael, eds. (2006). Hegel's Philosophy of Mind. Oxford University Press. doi:10.1093/actrade/9780199299515.book.1. ISBN 978-0-19-929951-5.

== See also ==
- William Wallace (philosopher)
- Michael Inwood
