= Jean Hyppolite =

French philosopher (1907–1968)

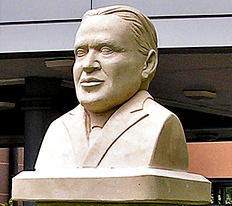
- Bust of Jean Hyppolite by Jean-Marie Meslin
- Born: 8 January 1907; Jonzac, Poitou-Charentes, France
- Died: 26 October 1968 (aged 61); Paris, France

Education
- Education: École Normale Supérieure
- Doctoral advisor: Émile Bréhier

Philosophical work
- Era: 20th-century philosophy
- Region: Western philosophy
- School: Continental philosophy
- Institutions: University of Strasbourg; University of Paris; École Normale Supérieure; Collège de France
- Doctoral students: François Châtelet; Michel Serres
- Notable students: Gilles Deleuze; Jacques Derrida; Michel Foucault; Sarah Kofman; Jean Laplanche; Gilbert Simondon
- Main interests: History of philosophy
- Notable ideas: Correlating Hegel's Phenomenology to his Logics

Jean Hyppolite (French: [ʒɑ̃ ipɔlit]; 8 January 1907 – 26 October 1968) was a French philosopher known for championing the work of G. W. F. Hegel and other German philosophers, and educating some of France's most prominent post-war thinkers. His major works include Genèse et structure de la Phénoménologie de l'esprit de Hegel (1946) and Études sur Marx et Hegel (1955) and the first translation of Hegel's The Phenomenology of Spirit into French in 1939.

== Life and career ==
Hyppolite was born in Jonzac. He was a graduate of the École Normale Supérieure (ENS) at roughly the same time as Jean-Paul Sartre. After graduation he embarked on a serious study of Hegel, teaching himself German in order to read The Phenomenology of Spirit in the original. In 1939 he came out with his own translation and his commentary would later form the basis of the book Genesis and Structure of the Phenomenology of Spirit (published in 1947). After the Second World War, Hyppolite became a professor at the University of Strasbourg, before moving to the Sorbonne in 1949.

In 1952, Hyppolite published Logique et existence (Logic and Existence), a work that may have had a seminal effect on what was to become known as post-structuralism. This book tries to correlate Hegel's Phenomenology to his Logics (the Greater Logic and the Lesser Logic). In doing so, it raises the questions of language, being, and difference that were to become the hallmarks of new French philosophy at the end of the 20th century. The book was reviewed by the philosopher Gilles Deleuze. The translators of the English language edition of the text (SUNY Press, 1997) included Deleuze's review at the end of the volume.

In 1953 he founded the philosophical Épiméthée collection within the PUF publishing house.

In 1954, he became the director of the ENS and in 1955 produced a study of Karl Marx's earlier, more Hegelian period, at a time when the French interest in Hegel was at its apogee. In 1963, he was elected to the Collège de France and given a chair in The History of Philosophical Thought.

While philosophers such as Jean-Paul Sartre were known for producing new works influenced by German philosophy, Hyppolite is remembered as an expositor, teacher, and translator. He influenced a number of thinkers, including Gilles Deleuze, who studied Hegel under him at the Lycée Henri-IV, and Michel Foucault, as well as Jacques Derrida, Gérard Granel and Étienne Balibar (at the ENS).

Hyppolite died in Paris.

== Works ==
- Genesis and Structure of Hegel's Phenomenology of Spirit (1946)
- Introduction to Hegel's Philosophy of History (1948)
- Logic and Existence (1952)
- Studies on Marx and Hegel (1955)
- Figures de la pensée philosophique: écrits de Jean Hyppolite 1931-1968 (1971)
- Charles Péguy: Quatre Conférences (2024)

=== Translations into French ===
- G. W. F. Hegel, La Phénoménologie de l'esprit, Paris, Aubier, 1939

== See also ==
- Bernard Bourgeois
- Alexandre Kojève
- Jean Wahl
