= Aufheben =

German word

Aufheben (German: [ˈʔaʊ̯fˌheːbm̩, -bən]) or Aufhebung ([ˈaʊ̯fˌheːbʊŋ]) is a German word with several seemingly contradictory meanings, including "to lift up", "to abolish", "cancel" or "suspend", or "to sublate". The term has also been defined as "abolish", "preserve", and "transcend". In philosophy, aufheben is used by Hegel in his exposition of dialectics, and in this sense is translated mainly as "sublate".

== Hegel ==
In Hegel's philosophy, the term Aufhebung has the apparently contradictory implications of both preserving and changing, and eventually advancement (the German verb aufheben means "to cancel", "to keep" and "to pick up"). The tension between these senses suits what Hegel is trying to talk about. In sublation, a term or concept is both preserved and changed through its dialectical interplay with another term or concept. Sublation is the motor by which the dialectic functions.

Sublation can be seen at work at the most basic level of Hegel's system of logic. The two concepts Being and Nothing are each both preserved and changed through sublation in the concept Becoming. Similarly, in the Science of Logic (Doctrine of Being) determinateness, or quality, and magnitude, or quantity, are each both preserved and sublated in the concept measure.

== Marx ==
Marx adopts the concept of sublation from Hegel to describe the historical development of material conditions, however, reinterprets it through a materialist framework. While Hegel understood sublation as the self-realization of Geist (often translated as "mind" or "spirit") and as an ideal, universal spirit manifesting through history, Marx inverted this approach (as he explicitly says in Capital), grounding dialectical development in concrete, socio-economic contradictions, particularly those between classes. Although Marx acknowledged a “rational kernel” in Hegel’s dialectics, he rejected the notion that Geist could account for historical change in the materialist sense, arguing instead that it mystified real social relations by abstracting them from their class-based foundations. Thus, for Marx, historical development reflects the movement of material contradictions, not the ideal agency of spirit, and cannot be reduced to the unfolding of a universal mind.

== See also ==
- Schema (Kant)
- Sublimation
- Thesis, antithesis, synthesis
