= Ernst Wolfgang Orth =

German philosopher (1936–2024)

Ernst Wolfgang Orth (9 August 1936 in Bonn - 1 March 2024) was a German philosopher and professor for philosophy at the University of Trier.

Orth studied German, history, philosophy, and psychology at the universities of Mainz and Freiburg in the late 1950s and early 1960s, obtaining his doctorate in Mainz in 1965 with a thesis on the philosophy of language in Husserl and Hönigswald (published in 1967). From 1962 to 1970 Orth was an assistant to Gerhard Funke in Mainz. In 1970, he was appointed to the newly founded University of Trier, where he worked as professor of philosophy until his retirement as emeritus in 2001. During his active career, he held several visiting professorships at universities abroad (1983 Penn State, 1985 Ottawa, 1989 Milan, 1995 Graz, 1998 Kyoto). He was vice president of the German Society for Phenomenological Research (DGPF) from 1978 to 1983 and president from 1983 to 1987 and president of the Max Scheler Society from 2007 to 2009. Finally, Orth was also Managing Director of the General Society for Philosophy in Germany from 1981-1988.

In their obituaries, R. Becker, C. Bermes, and K.-H. Lembeck drew particular attention to Orth's 1996 book From Epistemology to the Philosophy of Culture, where theory of cognition morphs into Kulturphilosophie offsetting, as they write, "the loss of ultimate certainties of knowledge against the gain that the insight into the concrete conditions of human understanding of the world promises to give—even and especially when these conditions prove to be only provisionally stable because they are historically and culturally open." Particulars of this development found their treatment in many of Orth's publications. Placing himself "entirely", Becker, Bermes, and Lembeck write, "in the tradition of Dilthey, Husserl, or Cassirer" Orth's exemplified an anthropological philosophy that was not an obstacle but a necessary perspective within a framework of transcendental epistemology: It is based on a non-reductive foundation of 19th-century epistemology and has turned into a particular kind of first philosophy.

In 2006 Sebastian Luft argued that "the similarities between Natorp’s Marburg School neo-Kantianism and Husserl’s transcendental phenomenology outweigh the differences".
