= Bernard Mouat Jones =

British chemist and academic

Professor Bernard Mouat Jones DSO
- Born: 27 November 1882; Streatham
- Died: 11 September 1953 (aged 70); Waverley Abbey House, Farnham
- Education: Dulwich College; Balliol College, Oxford
- Occupation: Chemist

Bernard Mouat Jones DSO (27 November 1882 – 11 September 1953) was a British Chemist, notable for identifying the chemical in Mustard gas (dicholorodiethyl sulphide) and the first scientist to be Vice-Chancellor of the University of Leeds.

== Early life and education ==
Jones was born in Streatham, London on 27 November 1882, the fourth son of Alexander Moat Jones, a wine merchant, and Martha Eleanor (née Brinjes). He attended Queen's College, Streatham and Dulwich College. In 1901 he went up to Balliol College, Oxford where, three years later, he gained a first-class honours degree in chemistry, mineralogy, and crystallography.

== Early academic career ==
Jones worked for a year as research assistant to Professor W R Dunstan at the Imperial Institute, and was then, in 1906, appointed professor of chemistry at Government College, Lahore. In 1913 he returned to England as assistant professor at the Imperial College of Science and Technology.

== Military service ==
In 1914 Jones enlisted in the London Scottish regiment and was sent to France. Immediately after the first German gas attack in 1915 he was promoted to captain and became assistant director of the central laboratory, general headquarters, formed to organize defensive measures. He devised methods of protection from phosgene gas and of identifying quickly any new gas used by the enemy. He was the first to identify the chemical in mustard gas.

For his services he received the Distinguished Service Order (DSO) in 1917. In 1918 he became director of the laboratory with the rank of lieutenant-colonel.

== Later academic career ==
After the war he returned to academic life, as a chemistry professor at the University College of Wales, Aberystwyth (now Aberystwyth University), then in 1921 Principal of Manchester Municipal College of Technology. Whilst principal he was elected to Membership of the Manchester Literary and Philosophical Society on 14 December 1926 and was President of the Society 1931–33.

From 1938 to 1948 Jones was Vice-Chancellor of the University of Leeds. This included the Second World War, in which he also served in the Home Guard and for six months was in charge of the chemical warfare establishment at Porton Down.

== Death ==
Jones, who never married, lived after his retirement at Waverley Abbey House, Farnham, where he died on 11 September 1953 at the age of 70. His funeral was held at Farnham parish church on 17 September.

Academic offices
Preceded by Sir James Black Baillie	Vice-Chancellor, University of Leeds; 1938-1948	Succeeded by Charles Morris
Professional and academic associations
Preceded by Charles Edmond Stromeyer	President of the Manchester Literary and Philosophical Society; 1931–33	Succeeded by John Allan
