= Derrida and Husserl: The Basic Problem of Phenomenology =

2002 book by Leonard Lawlor

Derrida and Husserl The Basic Problem of Phenomenology
- Author: Leonard Lawlor
- Subject: Continental philosophy
- Publisher: Indiana University Press
- Publication date: 1 June 2002
- Media type: Print
- Pages: 280 pp (paperback)
- ISBN: 978-0253215086

Derrida and Husserl: The Basic Problem of Phenomenology is a 2002 book by American academic, Leonard Lawlor. It examines French philosopher Jacques Derrida's interpretation of German philosopher Edmund Husserl.

== Content ==
Derrida and Husserl contains four parts: Phenomenology and Ontology; The "Originary Dialectic" of Phenomenology and Ontology; The End of Phenomenology and Ontology; and The Turn in Derrida. This is followed by an afterword ("The Final Idea: Memory and Life"). In the book Lawlor uses the term "lifeism" to refer to a unified field within the 20th century continental philosophy of Maurice Merleau-Ponty, Jacques Derrida, Gilles Deleuze, Martin Heidegger and Michel Foucault, that focuses on life and death, involving concepts such as Edmund Husserl's Erlebnis and Henri Bergson's Élan vital.

== Reception ==
Kas Saghafi referred to Derrida and Husserl as the "first detailed and comprehensive examination of all of Derrida's major writings on Husserl". He praised Lawlor as "meticulously unpacking and elucidating works that 40 or 50 years after their publication still prove forbiddingly difficult."
