= Christiane Sourvinou-Inwood =

Hellenist and academic

- Born: 26 February 1945; Volos, Greece
- Died: 19 May 2007 (aged 62); Oxford, United Kingdom
- Spouse: Michael Inwood

Academic background
- Education: University of Athens (BA); University of Oxford (DPhil)
- Thesis: Minoan and Mycenaean afterlife beliefs and their relevance to the Homeric underworld (1973)

Academic work
- Discipline: Classics
- Sub-discipline: Ancient Greek religion; classical archaeology
- Institutions: University of Reading
- Notable works: "What is Polis Religion" and "Further Aspects of Polis Religion" (1990, republished in 2000) "Reading" Greek Culture (1991)

Christiane Sourvinou-Inwood (Greek: Χριστιάνα Σουρβίνου; 26 February 1945 – 19 May 2007) was a scholar in the field of ancient Greek religion and a highly influential Hellenist.

== Biography ==
Sourvinou-Inwood was born in Volos, Greece, in 1945, but grew up in Corfu. Sourvinou-Inwood studied at the University of Athens from 1962 to 1966, where she specialised in history and archaeology, and was a pupil of the Greek prehistoric archaeologist Spyridon Marinatos. After graduating with a starred first in Classics, she began research in the field of Mycenology in Rome, publishing her first article on the reading of a Linear B tablet from Knossos in 1968.

Sourvinou-Inwood moved to the United Kingdom in 1969. She the undertook research for a doctorate on Minoan civilization and Mycenaean beliefs in the afterlife at the University of Oxford; her doctoral supervisor was John Boardman. She completed her Doctor of Philosophy (DPhil) degree in 1973 with a thesis titled "Minoan and Mycenaean afterlife beliefs and their relevance to the Homeric underworld".

She worked as a lecturer in classical archaeology at Liverpool from 1976 to 1978. Later, she returned to her alma mater and was a senior research fellow at University College, Oxford from 1990 to 1995, and before being Reader in Classical Literature at the University of Reading from 1995 until her retirement in 1998.

== Research and influence ==
After her initial research into Minoan and Mycenaean Greece, Sourvinou-Inwood moved to studying Archaic and Classical Greece, in particular Greek religion, employing evidence from a wide variety of sources including material culture and iconography as well as literary texts, mythology, and ritual practices. She has been praised for the clarity and directness of her approach. In the words of a colleague, "she wanted scholars to abandon fashionable assumptions" and "to read ancient texts through the eyes of their contemporary readers"; she insisted on the need to eliminate anachronistic modern assumptions from the study of the ancient world in order to reconstruct the perceptions, beliefs, and ideologies of people in the ancient world.

According to the University of Reading Classics Department, Sourvinou-Inwood's acknowledged supremacy in the area of Greek religion studies made a lasting contribution to the Department's research, and this field continues to be one of its strongholds in the twenty-first century. In 2018, the Festschrift Πλειών. Papers in memory of Christiane Sourvinou-Inwood was published by the University of Crete, edited by Athena Kavoulaki. This followed a memorial conference that was held in 2012 in Crete.

=== Polis-religion model ===
One of Sourvinou-Inwood's most influential works was her development of the 'Polis-religion' model, which demonstrated how the ancient Greek city (polis) controlled religious life. This was originally explored in two articles, entitled "What is Polis Religion?" and "Further Aspects of Polis Religion"; the former has been described as "unquestionably the most influential article on Greek religion of the last 25 years".

== Fiction and poetry ==
After retiring from teaching in 1998, Sourvinou-Inwood began writing mystery novels set in ancient Greece, featuring a priestess as the detective; the novels draw extensively on her research. A collection of poems written during her undergraduate studies has also recently been published.

== Personal life ==
On 13 March 1971, Sourvinou-Inwood married Michael James Inwood, a philosopher and then a fellow of Trinity College, Oxford. They did not have any children.

== Honours ==
- Carl Newell Jackson Lectures at Harvard University (1994)
- Gedenkschrift: Kavoulaki, Athena, ed. (2018). Pleiōn: papers in memory of Christiane Sourvinou-Inwood. Rethymnon: School of Philosophy, University of Crete. ISBN 9786188222915.

== Selected works ==
=== Non-fiction ===
- Theseus as Son and Stepson: A Tentative Illustration of Greek Mythological Mentality (1979); ISBN 0900587393
- Studies in Girls' Transitions: Aspects of the Arkteia and Age Representation in Attic Iconography (1988)
- "Reading" Greek Culture: Texts and Images, Rituals and Myths (1991); ISBN 0-19-814750-3
- "Reading" Greek Death: To the End of the Classical Period (1995); ISBN 019814976X
- "What is Polis Religion?" and "Further Aspects of Polis Religion" in Oxford Readings in Greek Religion (edited by Richard Buxton 2000)
- Tragedy and Athenian Religion (2003); ISBN 0739104004
- Athenian Myths and Festivals: Aglauros, Erechtheus, Plynteria, Panathenaia, Dionysia (posthumously edited and published by Robert Parker 2011); ISBN 9780199592074

=== Novels ===
- Murder Most Classical (under the pseudonym Christiana Elfwood, 2007); ISBN 978-1843863571
- Murder at the City Dionysia (2008); ISBN 978-1843864745
- Murder near the Sanctuary (2008); ISBN 978-1843864752
