= Marlène Zarader =

French philosopher (1949–2025)

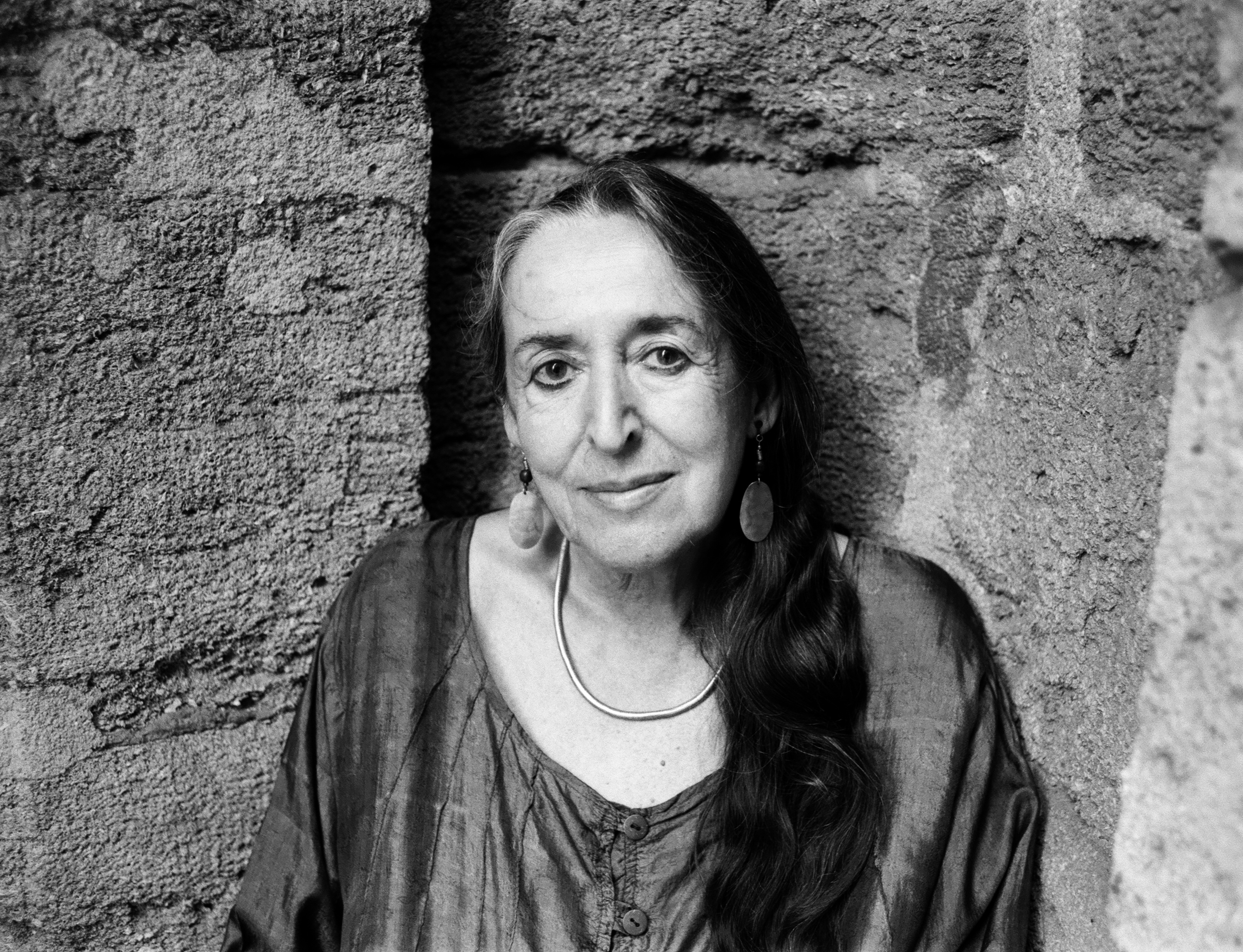
- Born: 29 December 1949; Algiers, Algeria
- Died: 6 June 2025 (aged 75); Montpellier, France
- Education: Paris-Sorbonne University
- Occupation: Philosopher

Marlène Zarader (29 December 1949 – 6 June 2025) was a French philosopher. She taught philosophy at the Paul Valéry University, Montpellier III in Montpellier. Zarader became a member of the Institut Universitaire de France in 2007. Her book The Unthought Debt was originally published in French in 1990. The work was translated into English by Bettina Bergo. She died in Montpellier on 6 June 2025, at the age of 75.

== Publications ==
- Heidegger et les paroles de l'origine, 1986
- La dette impensée. Heidegger et l'héritage hébraïque, 1990. Translated into English by Bettina Bergo (Stanford University Press, 2006).
- L'Être et le neutre. A partir de Maurice Blanchot, 2001
- La patience de Némésis, 2009

== Participations in other publications in English ==
- « Phenomenality and transcendence », in: Transcendence in philosophy and religion, J. E. Faulconer, Indiana University Press, 2002, p. 106-120.
- « The mirror with the triple reflection », in: Christopher Macann (ed.): Martin Heidegger: Critical Assessments [4 volumes], Routledge ed., London and New-York, 1992, vol. II, p. 17-36. Reissue in: Critical Heidegger, Routledge ed., London and New-York, 1996, p. 7-27.

== Sources ==
- review of The Unthought Debt
