= Bettina Bergo =

Canadian philosopher

Philosophical work
- Era: 21st-century philosophy
- Region: Western philosophy
- School: Continental
- Institutions: University of Montreal
- Main interests: post-Kantian philosophy

Bettina Bergo is a philosopher and Professor of Philosophy at the University of Montreal. Bergo is known for her work on continental philosophy.

== Books ==
- Levinas Between Ethics and Politics. Kluwer Academic Publishers, 1999. ISBN 0-7923-5694-2.
- Anxiety: A Philosophical History, Oxford University Press, 2020. ISBN 9780197539712.
- Merleau-Ponty, Maurice, Husserl at the Limits of Phenomenology, Including Texts by Edmund Husserl, edited by Leonard Lawlor with Bettina Bergo, Northwestern University Press, 2002, 192pp, ISBN 0810117479.
- Marlène Zarader, The Unthought Debt: Heidegger and the Hebraic Heritage, trans. Bettina Bergo, Stanford University Press, 2006, 255pp., $24.95 (pbk), ISBN 0804736863.
