= William Wallace (philosopher) =

Scottish philosopher (1844–1897)

William Wallace (11 May 1844 – 18 February 1897) was a Scottish philosopher and academic who became fellow of Merton College and White's Professor of Moral Philosophy at Oxford University. He was best known for his studies of German philosophers, most notably Hegel, some of whose works he translated into highly regarded English editions. While reputedly forbidding in manner, he was known as an able and effective teacher and writer who succeeded in greatly improving the understanding of German philosophy in the English-speaking world. He died at the age of 52 after a bicycle accident near Oxford.

== Life ==
Wallace was born at Railway Place in Cupar, Fife, the son of master-builder James Wallace and Jane Kelloch. He was the elder of two brothers and was educated at Madras Academy (now Bell Baxter High School) in Cupar before going on to St Andrews University to study arts. He developed a strong interest in the natural world, which led him to spend much time on walks in the countryside, cycling, botany and mountaineering.

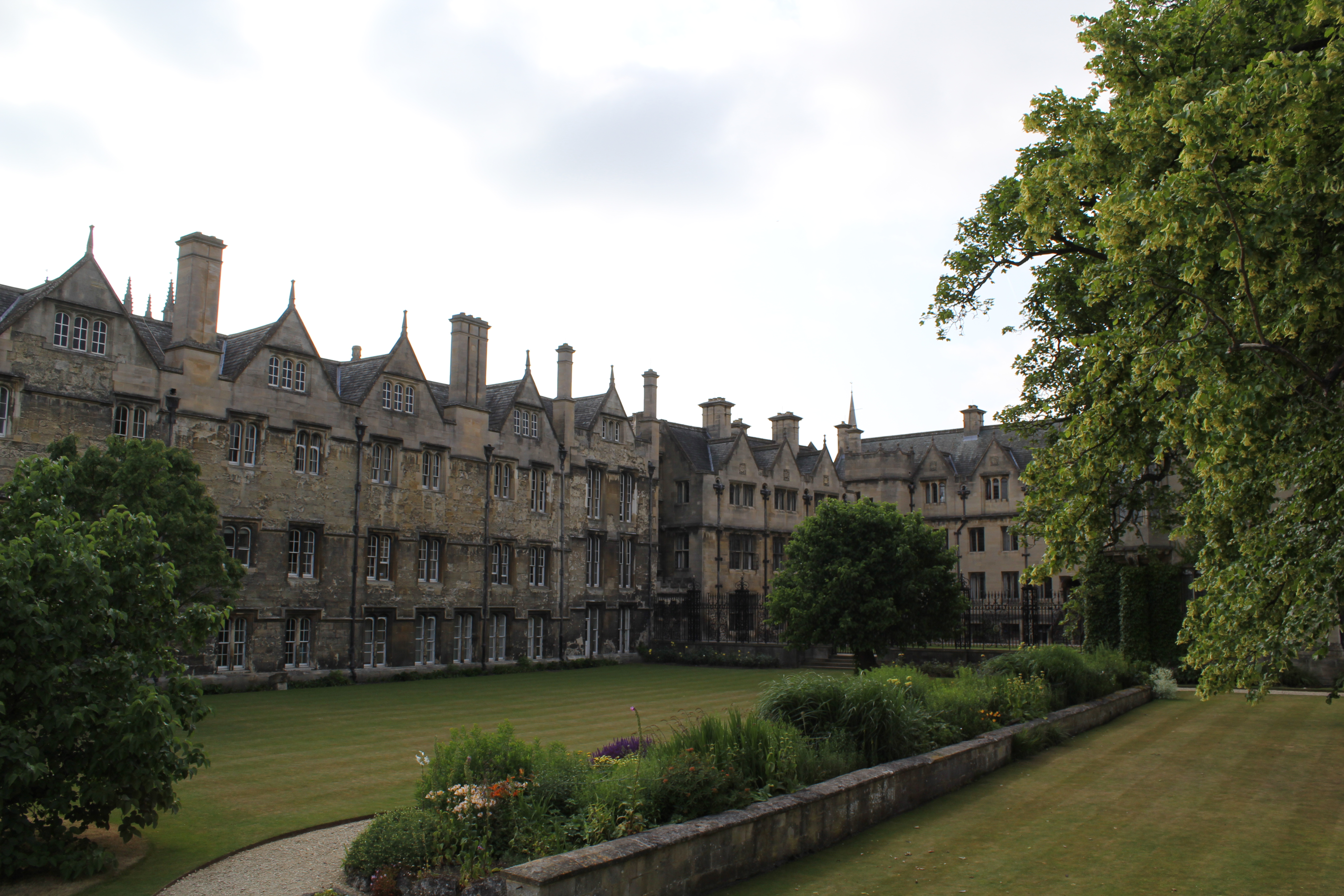
Merton College, Oxford

Although his parents had encouraged him to take up the study of theology as a precursor to a career in the clergy, Wallace realised that this would not best suit him and chose instead to study the Classics. He was awarded an exhibition at Balliol College, Oxford, where he studied from 1864. In 1867 he became a fellow of Merton College. He gained his Bachelor of Arts the following year, gaining a first class in Moderations and in Literae Humaniores. He was also awarded the Gaisford Prize in 1867 for his work on Greek prose, becoming a tutor at Merton in the same year, and was elected as a Craven Scholar in 1869. His Master of Arts followed in 1871 and he was appointed as Merton's librarian.

Wallace married Janet Barclay, a childhood friend from Cupar, on 4 April 1872. The couple had three children, a daughter and two sons. His younger brother Edwin Wallace studied at Oxford's Lincoln College and later served as vice-provost of Worcester College between 1881 and his death in 1884. In 1882, Wallace became the successor to Thomas Hill Green as White's Professor of Moral Philosophy at Oxford, a position which he held along with the Merton tutorship until his death fifteen years later.

His "brusque and sarcastic" manner earned him the nickname "the Dorian", a nickname he acquired at Balliol, though this was said to conceal a "generous and affectionate" nature. He was described as a man of "much genuine nobleness and a staunch uprightness of thought and speech" whose "acquaintances were numerous and friendly, but his intimates few and attached."

Wallace's work focused primarily on the study and diffusion of the ideas of the German philosophers Kant, Fichte, Herder, and Hegel, of whom it was said that his knowledge was exceptional. He was highly regarded as a teacher and lecturer, usually speaking without notes in a style described as "humorous, elegant, and yet earnest" that "produced a unique impression of insight and sincerity upon his students." He sought to encourage his students to think critically and aimed to explain the sometimes arcane and technical nature of philosophical constructs in a way that was both readily understandable and expressed imaginatively, for instance commenting in one of his works that "the Absolute Idea [of Hegel] may be compared to the old man who utters the same creed as a child, but for whom it is pregnant with the significance of a lifetime".

== Published works ==
His writings included The Logic and Prolegomena of Hegel (1873), a translation of Hegel's Encyclopaedia of the Philosophical Sciences. It was still regarded as "the most masterly and influential of all English translations of Hegel" when it was republished in 1975. The translation was accomplished in a free and creative style accompanied by extensive explanatory notes on the text, drawing parallels between the philosophy of Hegel and classical figures such as Plato and Aristotle. He published Epicurean Philosophy in 1880, tracing the origins of Epicureanism and highlighting the links between the life of Epicurus and the philosophy that he espoused.

Wallace's Kant (1882), part of Blackwood's Philosophical Classics series, portrayed the German philosopher as engaged in a dialogue with John Locke and David Hume, two of the most influential British Empiricists. He published The Life of Arthur Schopenhauer in 1890 in which his biographical account was accompanied by a critique of the philosopher's rejection of empiricism and materialism. He attacked Schopenhauer's "unconquerable vanity" but praised his insight into the power of art and his belief that "the best life is one predicated on the underlying unity of all experience". He travelled extensively to research both works, touring Germany to learn about the cultural and geographical environment in which the German philosophers had lived and worked.

A second edition of The Logic of Hegel followed in 1892 and a third edition was published in 1893 with a lengthy analytical introduction. Wallace's work on Hegel focused on the themes that most resonated with a British audience, such as unity and community, while giving relatively less attention to more alien ideas such as the dialectic. In 1894 he published a translation of the last part of Hegel's Encyclopaedia under the title of The Philosophy of Mind, accompanied by five essays commenting on questions such as the method of psychology and how it related to ethics and theology. His final work, published posthumously by Edward Caird, was his Lectures and Essays on Natural Theology and Ethics which he had delivered in 1892 at the University of Glasgow as part of the Gifford Lectures on the history of natural theology.

== Death ==
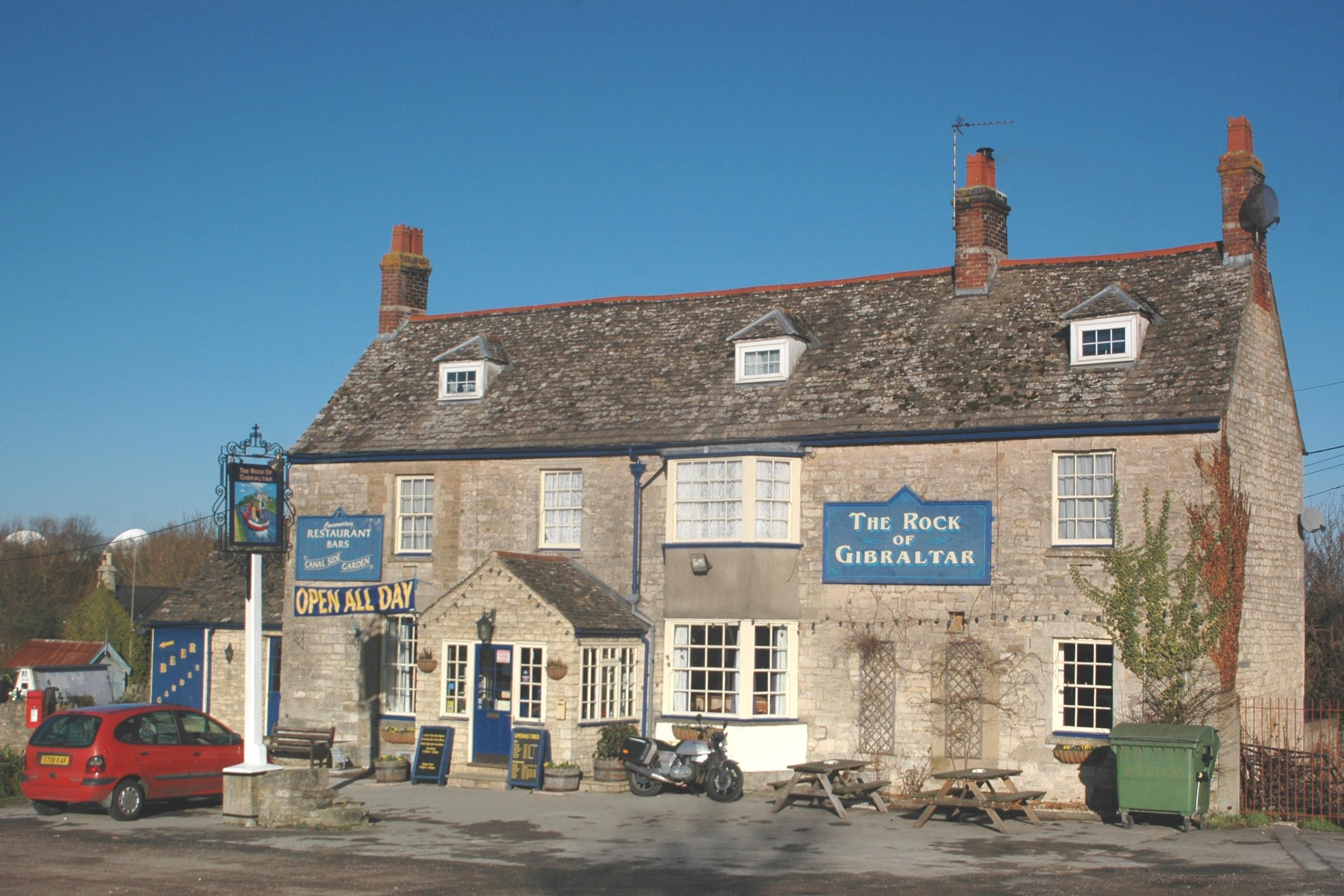
The Rock of Gibraltar Inn near Enslow Bridge

Wallace died on 19 February 1897 as a result of a bicycle accident. While descending a steep hill in Enslow Bridge in Bletchington near Oxford, he lost control of his bicycle and hit a parapet wall, fracturing his skull. He was found unconscious under his bicycle and was carried on a hurdle to The Rock of Gibraltar Inn in Enslow, where he died early the next day without regaining consciousness. He is buried in Holywell Cemetery, Oxford, with his wife and one of his sons.

== Works ==
- The Logic of Hegel (1873) (contains translation of Hegel's Encyclopaedia of the Philosophical Sciences in Outline), 2nd edition 1892 with introductory volume Prolegomena
- Epicureanism (1880)
- Kant (1882)
- Life of Arthur Schopenhauer (1890)
- Hegel's Philosophy of Mind (1894) (translation from the Encyclopaedia with five introductory essays)
- Lectures and Essays on Natural Theology and Ethics (1898)
