= Leo Rauch =

German-American philosopher (1927–1997)

- Born: 1927; Berlin, Germany
- Died: 1997 (aged 69–70); Massachusetts

Academic background
- Education: New York University (PhD)
- Thesis: Intentionality and Its Development in the Phenomenological Psychology of Edmund Husserl (1968)

Academic work
- Era: Contemporary philosophy
- Region: Western philosophy
- Institutions: Babson College

Leo Rauch (1927 Berlin, Germany – 1997 Massachusetts) was a German-American philosopher, commentator on continental philosophy (mainly Plato, Kant and Hegel), translator of the writings of G. W. F. Hegel into English.

== Curriculum vitae ==
He received his doctorate in philosophy from New York University in 1968 with a dissertation on Intentionality and Its Development in the Phenomenological Psychology of Edmund Husserl. Over the following years, he was affiliated with Ohio State University, the Universities of Texas and Cincinnati, and the Center for Philosophy and History of Science at Boston University. Most recently, he worked in the Department of Philosophy at Babson College in Massachusetts.

His wife was Gila Ramras-Rauch (1933–2005), a lecturer in Hebrew language and Jewish and Holocaust literature at Boston's Hebrew College and winner of the Israeli State Prize in Literature in 1983.

== Work highlights ==
- Plato's The Republic: And Phaedrus, Symposium, Apology, Crito, Phaedo, and other works (1965),
- The philosophy of Immanuel Kant (1965),
- The philosophy of Hegel (1965),
- Crisis on the Left (1978),
- The political animal : Studies in political philosophy from Machiavelli to Marx. 1981. ISBN 978-0-87023-338-8. (1981),
- Hegel and the Human Spirit: A Translation of the Jena Lectures on the Philosophy of Spirit (1805-6) with Commentary. Wayne State University Press. 1983. ISBN 978-0-8143-1739-6. (1983, translation and commentary),
- The ancient mind: Study guide (1984),
- Introduction to the Philosophy of History (1988, translation and commentary),
- Plato's Republic (1989),
- Kant's Foundations of Ethics (1995, translator),
- Hegel's Phenomenology of Self-Consciousness: Text and Commentary. State University of New York Press. 27 May 1999. ISBN 978-1-4384-1693-9. (1999, translation and commentary).
