= Michael Inwood =

British philosopher (1944–2021)

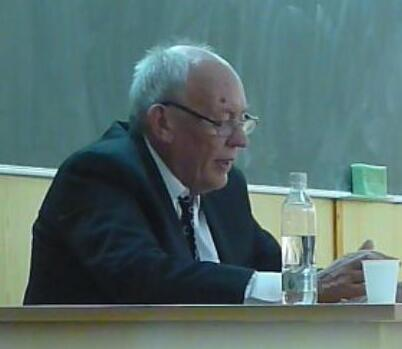
- Inwood in 2011
- Born: Michael James Inwood; 12 February 1944; London, England
- Died: 31 December 2021 (aged 77); Kidlington, England
- Spouse(s): Christiane Sourvinou-Inwood (d. 2007); Mariuta Teodorescu Inwood (m. 2017)

Academic background
- Education: University College, Oxford

Academic work
- Era: 21st-century philosophy
- Region: Western philosophy
- School or tradition: Continental philosophy
- Institutions: Trinity College, Oxford
- Doctoral students: Włodzimierz Julian Korab-Karpowicz
- Notable students: Sebastian Stein
- Main interests: Hegel, Heidegger, ancient philosophy

Michael James Inwood (12 February 1944 – 31 December 2021) was a British philosopher and fellow of Trinity College, Oxford. He is known for his works on Hegel, Heidegger and ancient philosophy.

On 13 March 1971, Inwood married Christiane Sourvinou-Inwood; she was then a doctoral student at Oxford and went on to become a classical scholar. They did not have any children, and she predeceased him in 2007.

Inwood died from lung cancer in Kidlington on 31 December 2021, at the age of 77.

== Publications ==
- Inwood, Michael (2018). Hegel: The Phenomenology of Spirit, Translated with Introduction and Commentary. Oxford: OUP Oxford. ISBN 9780192534583.
- Inwood, Michael J. (2007). A Hegel Dictionary. Blackwell Reference Online (1992 first ed.). Oxford: Blackwell. ISBN 9780631175339.
- Inwood, M. J. (2000). Heidegger: A Very Short Introduction. Oxford University Press.
- Inwood, M. J. (2008). A Heidegger Dictionary. Oxford, UK: Blackwell Publishers.

== See also ==
- Christiane Sourvinou-Inwood
- Arnold Vincent Miller
- William Wallace (philosopher)
