= Sebastian Luft =

Sebastian Luft (born August 26, 1969) is a German professor of theoretical philosophy at Paderborn University.

== Education ==
Luft received his Magister Artium in 1994 from Heidelberg University, followed by a doctorate (summa cum laude) in 1998 from the University of Wuppertal. In 2013, he completed his Habilitation at the University of Würzburg.

== Background ==
Luft is working within a Kantian philosophical framework, broadly understood, and has been influenced by Ernst Wolfgang Orth's philosophical anthropology.

== Works ==
=== Selected publications ===
- Luft, Sebastian (2011). Subjectivity and Lifeworld in Transcendental Phenomenology. Northwestern University Press. doi:10.2307/j.ctv47wch6. ISBN 978-0-8101-2743-2. JSTOR j.ctv47wch6.
- "Phänomenologie der Phänomenologie". Phaenomenologica. 166. 2002. doi:10.1007/978-94-010-0493-0. ISBN 978-1-4020-0901-3. ISSN 0079-1350.

==== Editorials ====
- Luft, Sebastian (2015). The Neo-Kantian Reader (1 ed.). London: Routledge. doi:10.4324/9781003572480. ISBN 978-1-003-57248-0.
- Luft, Sebastian; Overgaard, Soren, eds. (2013). The Routledge Companion to Phenomenology (0 ed.). Routledge. doi:10.4324/9780203816936. ISBN 978-1-136-72563-0.
