= James Black Baillie =

Scottish philosopher (1872–1940)

- Baillie in 1931
- Born: James Black Baillie; October 24, 1872; Forfarshire
- Died: 9 June 1940 (aged 67)
- Spouse: Helena May James (m. 1906)

Academic background
- Education: University of Edinburgh (PhD)
- Thesis: The Growth of Hegel's Logic (1899)

Academic work
- Era: 20th Century Philosophy
- Discipline: Philosophy
- School or tradition: German Idealism
- Institutions: University of Leeds
- Main interests: G. W. F. Hegel

Sir James Black Baillie, OBE (24 October 1872 – 9 June 1940) was a British moral philosopher and Vice-Chancellor of the University of Leeds. He provided the first significant translation of Hegel's "Phenomenology of Mind". He is said to be the model for the character Sir John Evans in the novel The Weight of the Evidence (1944) by Michael Innes.

== Early life and education ==
Baillie was born in West Mill, Cortachy, Forfarshire. He studied at the University of Edinburgh, where he gained a PhD in 1899 on The Growth of Hegel's Logic, and at Trinity College, Cambridge.

== Career ==
Baillie lectured in philosophy at University College, Dundee and in August 1902 was appointed Regius Professor of Moral Philosophy at the University of Aberdeen.

During the First World War he was in the intelligence division of the British Admiralty. After public service posts, Baillie was appointed Vice-Chancellor of the University of Leeds in 1924. He remained at Leeds until his retirement in 1938.

== Marriage ==
In 1906 Baillie married Helena May James. They had no children.

== Honours ==
Baillie was appointed an Officer of the Order of the British Empire (OBE) in the 1919 New Year Honours, made a Knight Commander of the Order of the Crown of Italy following a meeting with Italian leader Benito Mussolini and received a knighthood in 1931.

== Death ==
Baillie died of prostate cancer in Weybridge, Surrey in 1940 at the age of 67.

== Publications ==
- The Origin and Significance of Hegel's Logic: A General Introduction to Hegel's System. Macmillan. 1901.

== Translations ==
- Hegel, G. W. F. (1910). The Phenomenology of Mind. doi:10.4324/9781315830308. ISBN 978-1-315-83030-8.

Academic offices
Preceded by Sir Michael Ernest Sadler	Vice-Chancellor, University of Leeds; 1924-1938	Succeeded by Bernard Mouat Jones
