= Encyclopaedia of the Philosophical Sciences in Basic Outline =

1817 book by G.W.F Hegel

Encyclopedia of the Philosophical Sciences
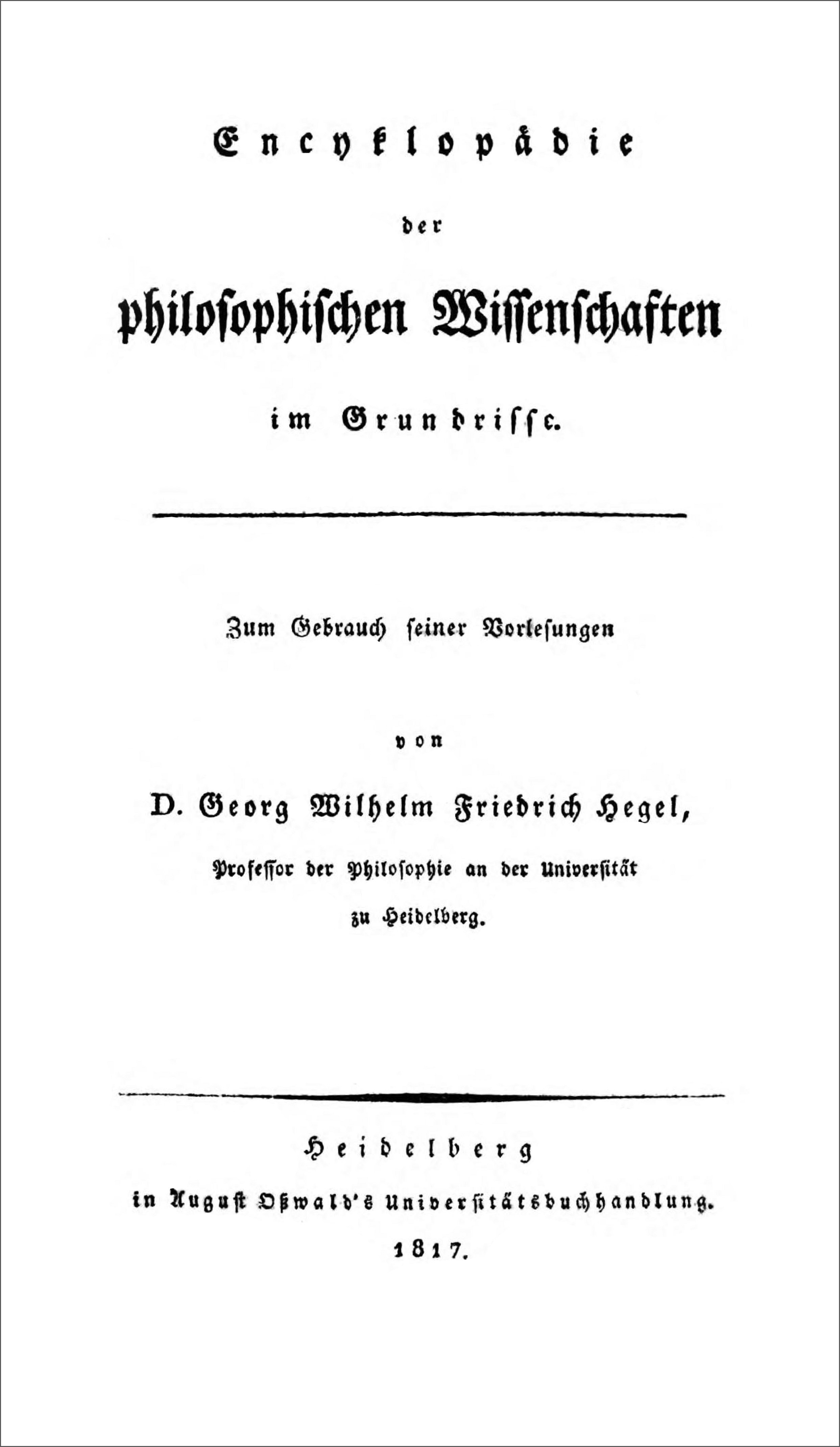
- Author: Georg Wilhelm Friedrich Hegel
- Original title: Enzyklopädie der philosophischen Wissenschaften im Grundrisse
- Language: German
- Subject: Philosophy
- Published: 1817
- Publication place: Germany
- Media type: Print

The Encyclopaedia of the Philosophical Sciences in Basic Outline (German: Enzyklopädie der philosophischen Wissenschaften im Grundrisse), (Note: Original spelling: Encyclopädie der philosophischen Wissenschaften. In English also: Encyclopedia of the Philosophical Sciences in Basic Outline.) by Georg Wilhelm Friedrich Hegel (first published in 1817, second edition 1827, third edition 1830), is a work that presents an abbreviated version of Hegel's systematic philosophy in its entirety, and is the only form in which Hegel ever published his entire mature philosophical system.

Intended as a pedagogical aid for attendees of his lectures, Hegel revised and extended the Encyclopedia over more than a decade, but stressed its role as a "textbook" in need of elucidation through oral commentary. The 1830 text is widely available in various English translations with copious additions (Zusätze) added posthumously by Hegel's students, deriving from their lecture notes. These additions expand on the text with examples and illustrations, and while scholars do not take the Zusätze to be verbatim transcription of Hegel's lectures, their more informal and non-technical style make them good stand-ins for the "necessary oral commentary".

Part I of the work is sometimes referred to as the Lesser Logic (or Shorter Logic) to distinguish it from the Greater Logic, the moniker given to Hegel's Science of Logic.

== Structure ==
The Encyclopedia has three main parts, each of which is further subdivided, which together purport to cover all the fundamental aspects of reality, and form a closed systematic unity.

1. Science of Logic
  1. Being
  2. Essence
  3. Concept (Begriff, or notion)
2. Science of Nature
  1. Mechanics
  2. Physics
  3. Organics
3. Science of Geist
  1. Subjective
  2. Objective
  3. Absolute Spirit

Hegel is careful to methodically derive each category of reality ('thought-determination') from its predecessor notion, with the completed system bringing the circle to a close, demonstrating its unity.

== Overview ==
The work describes the pattern of the Idea as manifesting itself in dialectical reasoning.

While some believe that the philosophy of nature and mind are applications of the logic, this is a misunderstanding. The purpose of the Encyclopedia is descriptive: to describe how the idea (or reason) develops itself and not to apply the dialectical method to all areas of human knowledge, but the Idea is in the process of growing, like a seed growing into a mature tree: it passes through stages. The first stage of the idea's development is described in the Logic. Thus, the Logic presents the categories of thought as they are in themselves; they are the minimal conditions for thinking anything at all, the conceptions that run in the background of all our thinking. For Hegel, unlike Kant, reason is not just "for us", but rather it is immanent within being. The rational alone is real, and is the substrate of all things. In order to get at what a thing is, we must think about it. No amount of observing will bring us to the essence of things. Thinking and being are equivalent, and so logic and metaphysics are equivalent as well.

As the idea works itself out more fully, it reaches the point where it simply cannot remain as it is; it is incomplete, and therefore it "others" itself; this is where the philosophy of nature emerges. When this stage of its development is completed, the idea "returns" to itself, which is the emergence of the philosophy of mind, or Geist, out of nature. Spirit is reason become self-conscious of itself as reason.

Hegel used the term "diamond net" in the book. He said, “the entire range of the universal determinations of thought… into which everything is brought and thereby first made intelligible.” In other words, the diamond net of which Hegel speaks are the logical categories according to which we understand our experience, thus making our empirical observations intelligible.

== English translations ==
- Hegel's Logic: Being part one of the Encyclopaedia of the philosophical sciences (1830). 1975.
- Hegel's Philosophy of mind. Oxford, Clarendon Press. 1894.
- Hegel, Georg Wilhelm Friedrich (2006). Wallace, William; Miller, A. V.; Inwood, Michael (eds.). Hegel's Philosophy of Mind. doi:10.1093/actrade/9780199299515.book.1. ISBN 978-0-19-929951-5.
- Hegel, Georg Wilhelm Friedrich (2004). Miller, A. V.; Findlay, J. N. (eds.). Hegel's Philosophy of Nature. doi:10.1093/actrade/9780199272679.book.1. ISBN 978-0-19-927267-9.
- Hegel, Georg Wilhelm Fredrich (2010). Brinkmann, Klaus; Dahlstrom, Daniel O. (eds.). Georg Wilhelm Friedrich Hegel: Encyclopedia of the Philosophical Sciences in Basic Outline. doi:10.1017/9780511780226. ISBN 978-0-511-78022-6.

== Bibliography ==
- The Encyclopaedia Logic: Part 1 of the Encyclopaedia of Philosophical Sciences, trans. T. F. Geraets, W. A. Suchting, and H. S. Harris (Indianapolis: Hackett, 1991).
- Philosophy of Nature (Part Two of the Encyclopaedia of Philosophical Sciences), trans. Michael John Petry, 3 vols., (London: George Allen and Unwin, 1970).
- Hegel's Philosophy of Mind: Being Part Three of the Encyclopaedia of Philosophical Sciences, trans. William Wallace (Oxford: Clarendon Press, 1971).
