= Ira Katznelson =

American political scientist and historian

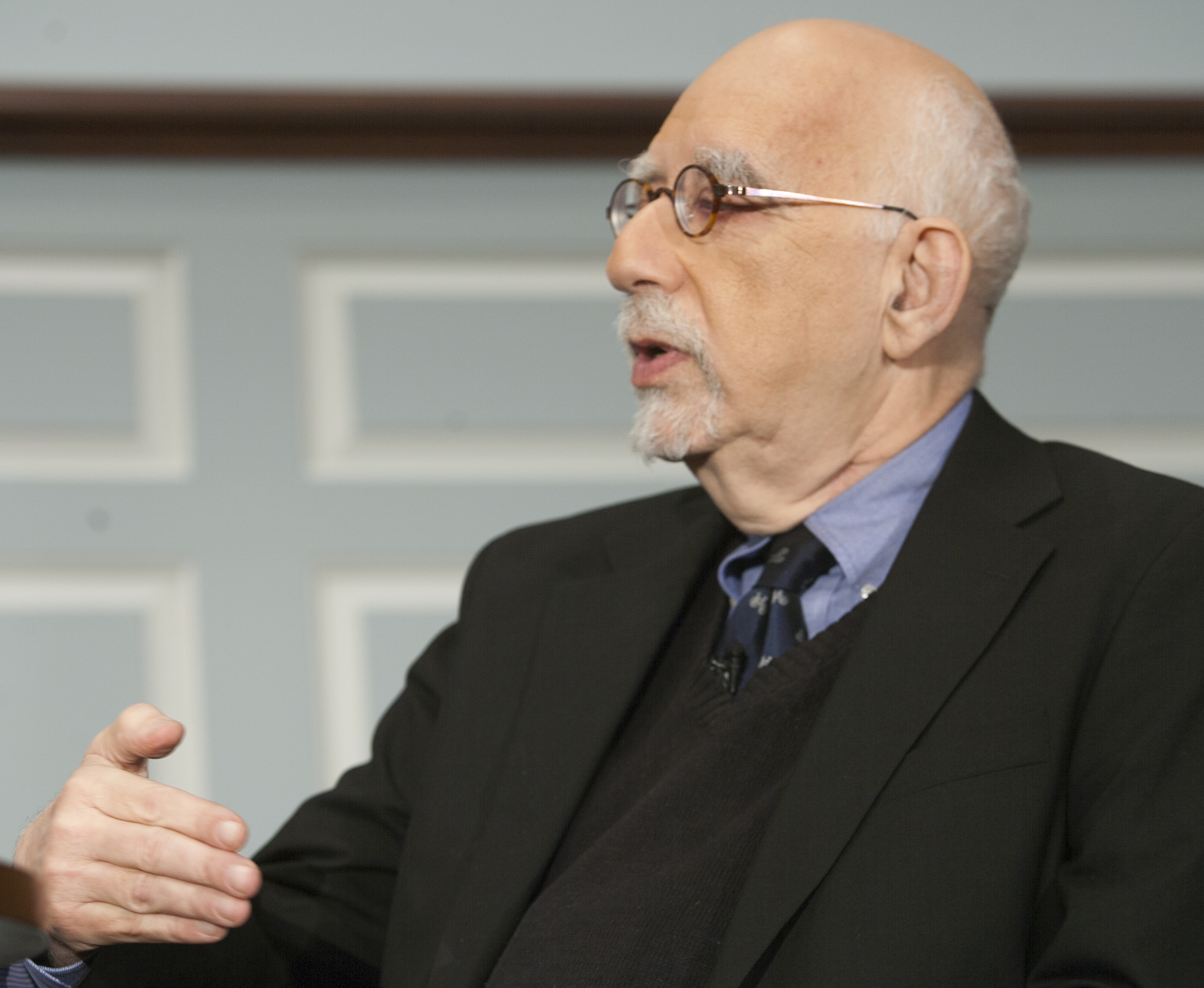
- Born: 1944 (age 81–82)
- Known for: Co-founder of Politics & Society

Academic background
- Education: Columbia University (BA); University of Cambridge (PhD)
- Doctoral advisor: Henry Pelling

Academic work
- Discipline: Political science History
- Institutions: Columbia University, University of Chicago, The New School, Social Science Research Council

Ira I. Katznelson (born 1944) is an American political scientist and historian, noted for his research on the liberal state, inequality, social knowledge, and institutions, primarily focused on the United States. His work has been characterized as an "interrogation of political liberalism in the United States and Europe—asking for definition of its many forms, their origins, their strengths and weaknesses, and what kinds there can be".

== Early life and education ==
Katznelson's parents emigrated to the United States after World War I, from Belorussia and Poland. They lived in New York City, where Katznelson attended school at the Yeshivah of Flatbush, Brooklyn. Katznelson earned a Bachelor of Arts degree from Columbia University in 1966 and completed his PhD in history at the University of Cambridge in 1969. Among his influences, he includes Richard Hofstadter, Ralf Dahrendorf, Robert Dahl, and Daniel Bell.

== Career ==
Katznelson taught at Columbia from 1969 to 1974, at the University of Chicago from 1974 to 1983, and at The New School for Social Research from 1983 to 1994. Katznelson was chair of the department of political science at the University of Chicago from 1979 to 1982 and dean of The New School from 1983 to 1989, where he taught political science and history until 1994.

In 1994, Katznelson returned to Columbia, where he is the Ruggles professor of political science and history. In 2012, he was named president of the Social Science Research Council. In 2019, Katznelson was named interim provost at Columbia. In that position, he represented management in contested negotiations with the graduate student union, a position he noted was "painful" given his "longstanding connections with the labor movement." As of July 1, 2021, he was succeeded as provost by Mary Cunningham Boyce.

Katznelson helped to launch the journal Politics & Society with Gerald Dorfman and others. He was lead editor beginning with its first issue, which appeared in 1970. He was succeeded by Margaret Levi. Katznelson was president of the American Political Science Association (APSA) in 2005 and 2006. He previously served as president of APSA's Politics and History Section in 1992 and 1993, and as president of the Social Science History Association in 1997 and 1998. He has also been a Guggenheim Fellow, and was elected as a fellow of the American Academy of Arts and Sciences in 2000 and the American Philosophical Society in 2004. Katznelson has received honorary doctorates from the New School in 1994, Queens College in 2016, and the University of Cambridge in 2018.

=== Contributions ===
Katznelson has written or co-written ten books, co-edited several others, and published over sixty journal articles. He questions "when and why liberal democracies become normatively appealing (less closed and more tolerant) and more effective (less vulnerable and more secure)." He is particularly interested in the connections and transitions between the political traditions of liberalism and republicanism in the United States. His work goes beyond the study of U.S. politics to include international relations, political theory, comparative politics, and comparative history.

His book Liberalism’s Crooked Circle: Letters to Adam Michnik (1996) won American Political Science Association's (APSA) Michael Harrington Prize. Desolation and Enlightenment (2003) won the David and Elaine Spitz Award of the Conference of Political Thought, given to the best book in liberal or democratic theory, and the David Easton Award of APSA's Foundations of Political Thought Section. In March 2014, Katznelson was awarded the Bancroft Prize for his book Fear Itself: The New Deal and the Origins of Our Time.

== Bibliography ==
- Black Men, White Cities; Race, Politics, And Migration In The United States, 1900–30 and Britain, 1948–68. 1973. Oxford University Press.
- City Trenches: Urban Politics And The Patterning Of Class In The United States. 1981. Pantheon Books.
- Schooling For All: Class, Race, And The Decline Of The Democratic Ideal. 1985. Basic Books. (written with Margaret Weir).
- Working-Class Formation: Nineteenth-Century Patterns In Western Europe And The United States. 1986. Princeton University Press. (edited with Aristide Zolberg).
- Marxism And The City. 1992. Oxford University Press.
- Paths of Emancipation: Jews, States, And Citizenship. 1995. Princeton University Press. (edited with Pierre Birnbaum).
- Liberalism’s Crooked Circle: Letters to Adam Michnik. 1996. Princeton University Press.
- Shaped By War And Trade: International Influences On American Political Development. 2002. Princeton University Press. (edited with Martin Shefter).
- Political Science: The State Of The Discipline. 2002. W.W. Norton. (edited with Helen Milner).
- Desolation And Enlightenment: Political Knowledge After Total War, Totalitarianism, And The Holocaust. 2003. Columbia University Press.
- When Affirmative Action Was White: An Untold History Of Racial Inequality In Twentieth-Century America. 2005. W.W. Norton.
- Preferences and Situations: Points of Intersection between Historical and Rational Choice Institutionalism. 2005. Russell Sage Foundation. (written with Barry Weingast).
- The Politics of Power: A Critical Introduction to American Government, 6th ed. 2006. (written with Mark Kesselman and Alan Draper). ISBN 978-0-15-570735-1
- Kalyvas, Andreas; Katznelson, Ira, eds. (2008). Liberal beginnings : making a republic for the moderns. Cambridge: Cambridge University Press. ISBN 9780521899468.
- Fear Itself: The New Deal and the Origins of Our Time. 2013. Liveright.

=== Critical studies and reviews ===
- Menand, Louis (March 4, 2013). "How the Deal went down: saving democracy in the Depression". The Critics. Books. The New Yorker. Vol. 89, no. 3. pp. 69–74. Reviews Fear itself : the New Deal and the origins of our time.
