= École libre des hautes études =

World War II-era expatriate school

Coordinates: 40.73549°N 73.99695°W

The École Libre des Hautes Études (lit. 'Free School for Advanced Studies') was a "university-in-exile" for French academics in New York during the Second World War. It was chartered by the French (the Free French) and Belgian governments-in-exile and located at the New School for Social Research. Its founders included Jean Wahl, Jacques Maritain, and Gustave Cohen, and it was supported by the Rockefeller Foundation.

The philosopher Jacques Maritain, the anthropologist Claude Lévi-Strauss, the historian Elias Bickerman, and the linguist Roman Jakobson all taught at the École Libre.

According to Louis Menand, in The Free World (p. 203) it was started in 1942 through the efforts of Alvin Johnson, co-founder and director of the New School.

== See also ==
- École des hautes études en sciences sociales
- École pratique des hautes études

== Sources ==
- Aristide R. Zolberg, "The Ecole Libre at the New School 1941–1946", Social Research, Winter 1998: at Encyclopedia.com – at FindArticles
- Menand, Louis (2021). The Free World (p. 203). Farrar, Straus and Giroux.
