= Jean Wahl =

French philosopher (1888–1974)

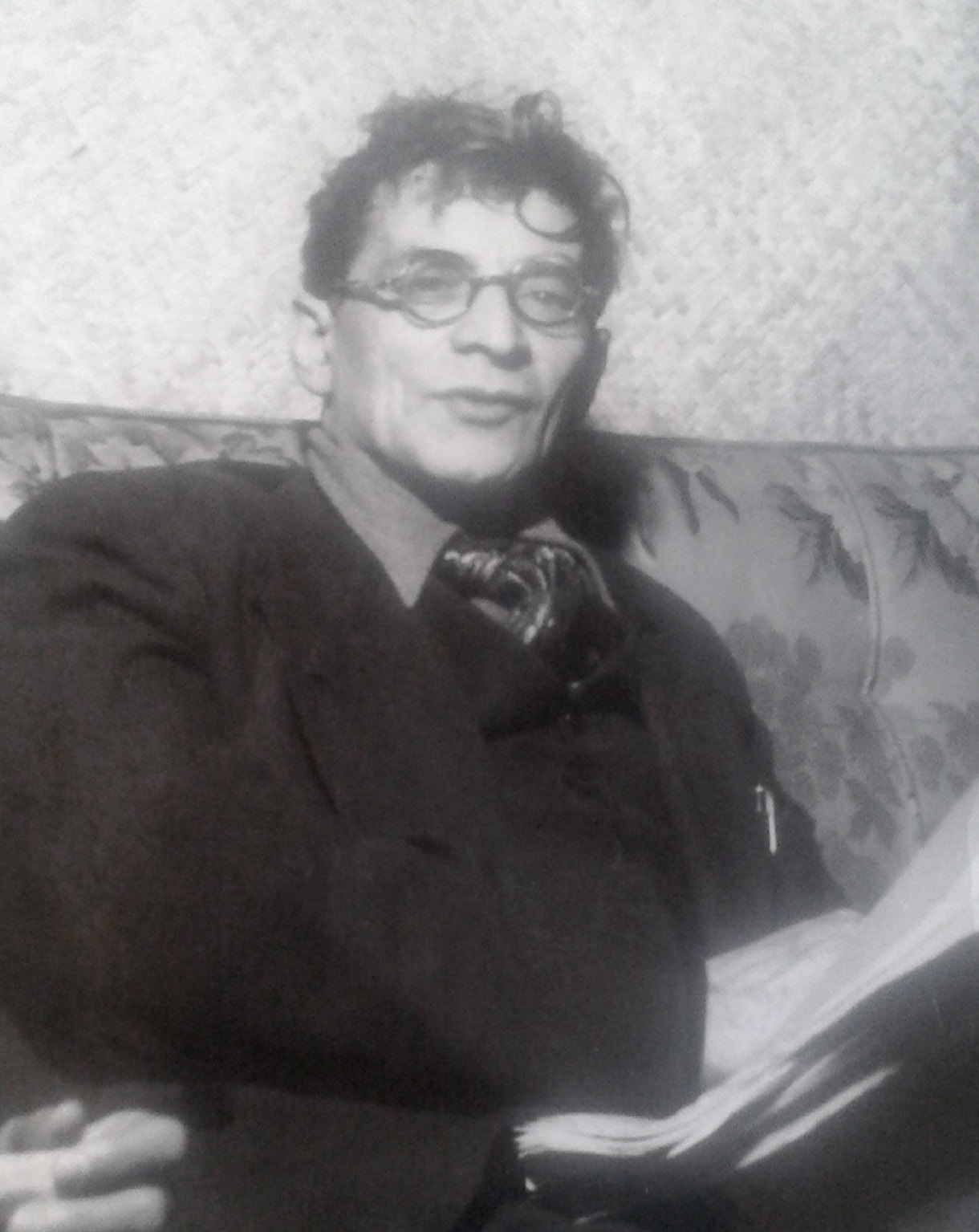
- Born: Jean André Wahl; 25 May 1888; Marseille, France
- Died: 19 June 1974 (aged 86); Paris, France
- Spouse: Marcelle Sicard

Education
- Education: École Normale Supérieure
- Doctoral advisor: Henri Bergson

Philosophical work
- Era: 20th-century philosophy
- Region: Western philosophy
- School: Continental philosophy Existentialism
- Institutions: University of Paris
- Doctoral students: Kostas Axelos; Michel Henry
- Notable students: Gilles Deleuze; Arthur Danto; Édouard Glissant
- Main interests: History of philosophy
- Notable ideas: Pluralism

Jean André Wahl (French: [val]; 25 May 1888 – 19 June 1974) was a French philosopher.

== Early career ==
Wahl was educated at the École Normale Supérieure. He was a professor at the Sorbonne from 1936 to 1967, interrupted by World War II. He was in the United States from 1942 to 1945, having been interned as a Jew at the Drancy internment camp (north-east of Paris) and then escaped.

He began his career as a follower of Henri Bergson and the American pluralist philosophers William James and George Santayana. He is known as one of those introducing Hegelian thought in France in the 1930s (his book on Hegel was published in 1929), ahead of Alexandre Kojève's more celebrated lectures. He was also a champion in French thought of the Danish proto-existentialist Søren Kierkegaard. These enthusiasms, which became the significant books Le malheur de la conscience dans la Philosophie de Hegel (1929) and Études kierkegaardiennes (1938) were controversial, in the prevailing climate of thought. However, he influenced a number of key thinkers including Gilles Deleuze, Emmanuel Levinas and Jean-Paul Sartre. In the second issue of Acéphale, Georges Bataille's review, Jean Wahl wrote an article titled "Nietzsche and the Death of God", concerning Karl Jaspers' interpretation of this work. He became known as an anti-systematic philosopher, in favour of philosophical innovation and the concrete.

== In exile ==
While in the U.S., Wahl with Gustave Cohen and backed by the Rockefeller Foundation founded a 'university in exile', the École Libre des Hautes Études, in New York City. Later, at Mount Holyoke where he had a position, he set up the Décades de Mount Holyoke, also known as Pontigny-en-Amérique, modelled on meetings run from 1910 to 1939 by French philosopher Paul Desjardins (22 November 1859 – 13 March 1940) at the site of the Cistercian abbey of Pontigny in Burgundy. These successfully gathered together French intellectuals in wartime exile, ostensibly studying the English language, with Americans including Marianne Moore, Wallace Stevens and Roger Sessions. Wahl, already a published poet, made translations of poems of Stevens into French. He was also an avid reader of the Four Quartets and toyed with the idea of publishing a poetical refutation of the poem. (See, e.g., his "On Reading the Four Quartets.")

== After World War II ==
In post-war France Wahl was an important figure, as a teacher and editor of learned journals. In 1946, he founded the Collège philosophique, influential center for non-conformist intellectuals, alternative to the Sorbonne. Starting in 1950, he headed the Revue de Métaphysique et de Morale.

Wahl translated the second hypothesis of the Parmenides of Plato as "Il y a de l'Un", and Jacques Lacan adopted his translation as a central point in psychoanalysis, as a sort of antecedent in the Parmenides of the analytic discourse. This is the existential sentence of psychoanalytic discourse according to Lacan, and the negative one is "Il n'y a pas de rapport sexuel" – there is no sexual relationship.

== Personal life ==
He received the Grand Prix littéraire de la Ville de Paris in June 1971. He was married to Marcelle Sicard (1915–2002).

== Wahl in literature ==
In 2021, Angelico Press published W. C. Hackett's novel Outside the Gates, based on the true story of Wahl's release from the Drancy Internment Camp. The narrator in the novel is Wahl himself, who alternatively tells what he is experiencing and muses philosophically on his situation in life, his sufferings and the sufferings of others in the war, and on whether or not there is a God. Hackett, himself a professional philosopher, artfully weaves in to the narrative former students and colleagues of Wahl.

== Works ==
- Du rôle de l'idée de l'instant dans la Philosophie de Descartes, Paris, Alcan, 1920; rééd. avec une préface de Frédéric Worms, Paris, Descartes & Co, 1994.
- Les Philosophies pluralistes d'Angleterre et d'Amérique, Paris, Alcan, 1920; rééd. préface de Thibaud Trochu, Les Empêcheurs de penser en rond, 2005.
- Le Malheur de la conscience dans la Philosophie de Hegel, Paris, Rieder, 1929.
- Étude sur le Parménide de Platon, Paris, Rieder, 1930.
- Vers le concret, études d'histoire de la philosophie contemporaine (William James, Whitehead, Gabriel Marcel), Paris, Vrin, 1932; rééd. avec un avant-propos de Mathias Girel, Paris, Vrin, 2004.
- Études kierkegaardiennes, Paris, Aubier, 1938.
- Les Problèmes platoniciens : La République, Euthydème, Cratyle (Paris: CDU, 3 fasc., 1938–1939).
- Existence humaine et transcendance, Neufchâtel, La Baconnière, 1944.
- Tableau de la philosophie française, Paris, Fontaine, 1946.
- Introduction à la pensée de Heidegger, livre de poche, 1946.
- Petite histoire de l'existentialisme, Paris, L'Arche, 1947.
- Poésie, pensée, perception, Paris, Calman-Levy, 1948.
- Jules Lequier 1814-1862, Geneva, Éditions des Trois Collines, 1948.
- La Pensée de l'existence, Paris, Flammarion, 1952.
- Traité de Métaphysique, Paris, Payot, 1953.
- La structure du monde réel d'après Nicolai Hartmann (Paris: Centre de documentation universitaire, 1953) (Cours de la Sorbonne enseigné en 1952).
- La théorie des catégories fondamentales dans Nicolai Hartmann (Paris: Centre de documentation universitaire, 1954) (Cours de la Sorbonne enseigné en 1953).
- Les Philosophies de l'existence, Paris, Armand Colin, 1954.
- Les aspects qualitatifs du réel. I. Introduction, la philosophie de l'existence; II. Début d'une étude sur Husserl; III. La philosophie de la nature de N. Hartmann, Paris: Centre de documentation universitaire 1955. (Cours de la Sorbonne enseigné en 1954).
- Vers la fin de l'ontologie - Étude sur l'«Introduction de la Métaphysique» de Heidegger, Paris, SEDES, 1956.
- L'Expérience métaphysique, Paris, Flammarion, 1964.
- Cours sur l'athéisme éclairé de Dom Deschamps, 1967.

=== English translations ===
- Wahl, Jean (1948). The Philosopher's Way. New York: Oxford University Press.
- Wahl, Jean (1925). The Pluralist Philosophies Of England And America. Chicago and London: Open Court. (mostly about William James)
- Wahl, Jean (1949). A Short History of Existentialism. New York: Philosophical Library.
- Wahl, Jean (1968). Philosophies of Existence: An Introduction to the Basic Thought of Kierkegaard, Heidegger, Jaspers, Marcel, Sartre. New York: Schocken Books.
- Wahl, Jean (2016). Schrift, Alan D.; Moore, Ian Alexander (eds.). Transcendence and the Concrete Selected Writings. Baltimore, Md.: Project MUSE. ISBN 0823273067.
- Wahl, Jean (2016). Human Existence and Transcendence. Translated by Hackett, William C. Notre Dame, IN: University of Notre Dame Press. ISBN 9780268101060.

== See also ==
- Bernard Bourgeois
- Jean Hyppolite
