= Martin Shefter =

American political scientist (1943–2023)

Martin Allen Shefter (1943 – November 3, 2023) was an American political scientist and author who was a professor emeritus in the Department of Government at Cornell University. He is noted for his research on New York City politics and on how changes in the international system shape political institutions and the conduct of politics in the United States.

== Biography ==
Shefter graduated with a B.A. in government from Cornell University in 1964 and completed his PhD degree at Harvard University in 1970. His doctoral dissertation examined "City Hall and State House: State Legislative Involvement in the Politics of New York City and Boston."

Shefter taught political science at Harvard, Cornell, and the University of Chicago, before returning to Cornell University in 1986. Shefter teaches urban politics, political parties and movements, and American political development.

From 1995, Shefter was a member of the executive committee of the Politics and History Section of the American Political Science Association and served as president of the section for 1996–97.

Shefter died on November 3, 2023, at the age of 79.

== Select publications ==
- Patronage and its Opponents: A Theory and Some European Cases. 1977. Cornell University.
- Political Crisis, Fiscal Crisis: The Collapse and Revival of New York City. 1985. Basic Books.
- Politics By Other Means: Politicians, Prosecutors, and the Press from Watergate to Whitewater. 1990. Basic Books. (written with Benjamin Ginsberg).
- Capital of the American Century: The National and International Influence of New York City. 1993. Russell Sage Foundation. (editor).
- Political Parties and the State: The American Historical Experience. 1994. Princeton University Press.
- Shaped By War and Trade: International Influences on American Political Development. 2002. Princeton University Press. (edited with Ira Katznelson).
