= Kierkegaardian Studies =

Book on philosophy

- Book cover to Études kierkegaardiennes
- Author: Jean Wahl
- Original title: Études kierkegaardiennes
- Language: French
- Subject: Philosophy
- Publication date: 1938
- Publication place: France
- Media type: Print (Hardback)

Kierkegaardian Studies (French: Études kierkegaardiennes) is a book about Søren Kierkegaard by philosopher Jean Wahl, originally published in 1938 in Paris, France. Its publication marked a significant turning-point in French philosophy, which formally introduced and disseminated Kierkegaard's philosophy to France.

Kierkegaardian Studies was one of the first French studies of Kierkegaard to treat him as a coherent philosopher and theologian, and raised questions that became central to Kierkegaard studies and to existentialism in general. Before Wahl's book, very few people in France knew much about Kierkegaard. After it, almost every French intellectual did.
