= Benjamin Ginsberg (political scientist) =

American political scientist

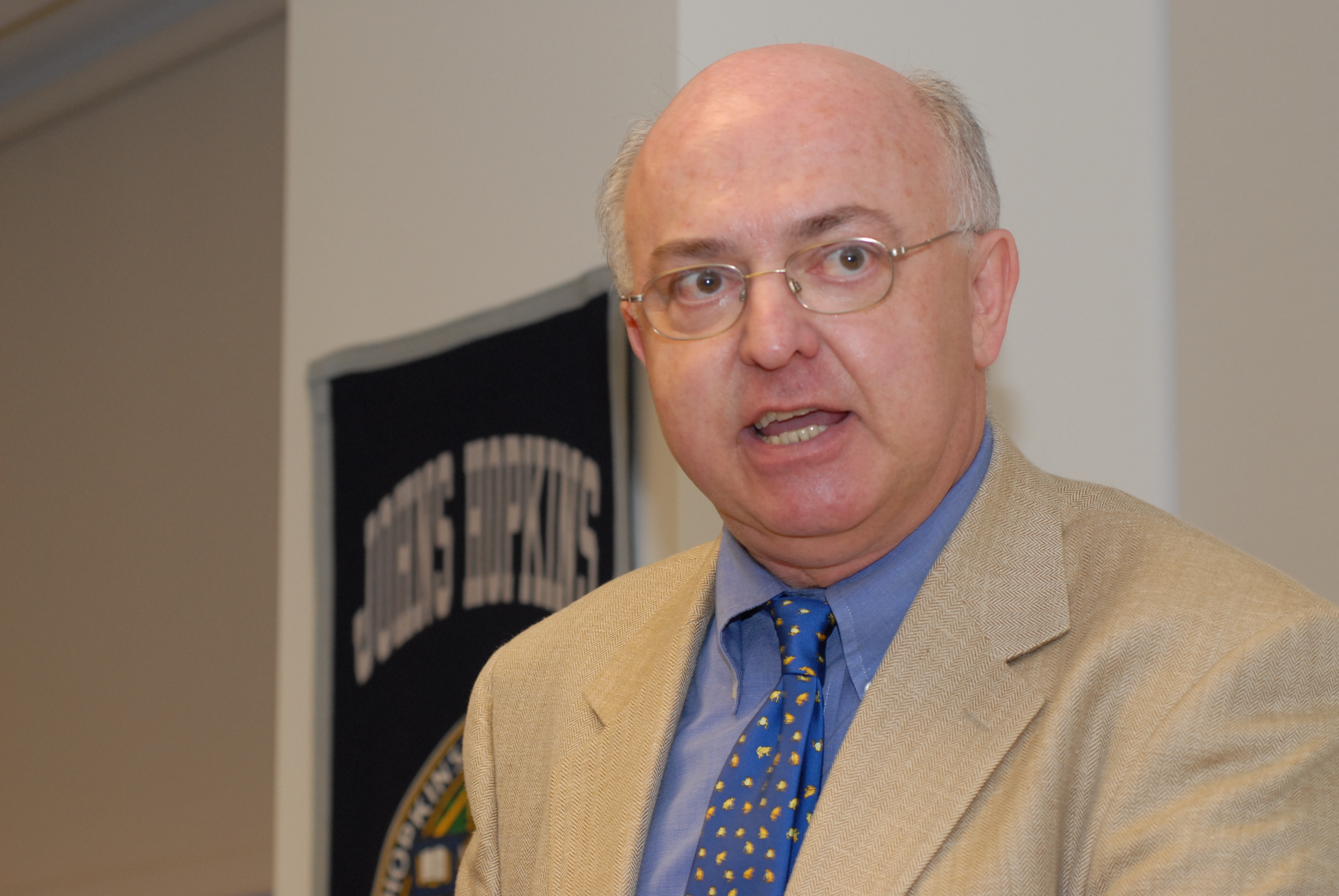
- Born: 1947 (age 78–79)
- Occupations: Chair, Johns Hopkins University Center for Advanced Governmental Studies

Academic background
- Education: University of Chicago

Academic work
- Discipline: Political science
- Institutions: Cornell University; Johns Hopkins University
- Main interests: Analysis of U.S. government; Jewish history; higher education policy; societal impact of war and violence
- Website: Faculty page at JHU

Benjamin Ginsberg (born 1947) is an American political scientist who is David Bernstein Professor, and Chair of Center for Advanced Governmental Studies, at Johns Hopkins University. Much of his earlier career was spent at Cornell University.

Noted for holding libertarian views, Ginsberg is known for his criticism of American politics, in which he says that citizens have become "marginalized as political actors" and political parties weakened while state power has grown. His assessment of the futility of voting, along with his notion that the public has an illusion of control over government, has caused controversy. He is a co-author, along with Matthew Crenson, of Downsizing Democracy, 2004, which received critical attention in mainstream newspapers.

== Biography ==
At the University of Chicago studying political science, Ginsberg earned a bachelor's degree in 1968, a master's degree in 1970, and a doctorate in 1973.

At Cornell University, Ginsberg was an instructor (1972), assistant professor (1973), associate professor (1978), and professor (1983). There he taught courses such as "Political Parties and Elections" and "Criminal Justice and Public Policy". He became director of the Cornell Institute for Public Affairs. He also acted as faculty advisor to the Cornell chapter of the College Republicans student organization.

He returned to University of Chicago in 1992 as the Exxon Foundation Lecturer for the Committee on Social Thought, also becoming a professor at Johns Hopkins University later that year.

He won the George E. Owen Award for outstanding teaching and service in June 2000, and again in 2016. From 2002 to 2004, he served as president of the National Capitol Area Political Science Association.

== Work ==
=== Downsizing Democracy ===
This 2002 book received serious critical attention from reviewers in major newspapers who explained, and criticized, the analysis of Ginsberg and co-author Matthew Crenson.

- A reviewer from the Associated Press elaborated that the authors commented on dwindling civic participation in America. A newspaper chronicled a pattern of reduced interest in civic groups, using diminished Lions Club attendance from the 1970s to 2004, as an example of the "decline of mass political participation." Ginsberg and Crenson argue that civic decline is "not simply a consequence of the decay of civil society brought on by TV, suburbanization and busy lives;" rather, government regulatory commissions, which were supposed to have served as watchdogs on special interests, have been taken over by those interests. As a result, "Citizens became less vigilant and involved, and interests like the banks and railroads came to control the very commissions that were supposed to work on behalf of the public good." Ginsberg criticizes "statutes and judicial rulings" for making advocacy by litigation commonplace, and effectively removing many issues from the political arena.
- The Washington Post discussed how Ginsberg and Crenson charted the declining importance of citizens to political and public life in the United States. People are better described as consumers, not citizens. Americans no longer embrace civic responsibility. Many people don't bother to vote, according to one report. The authors argue that the public has chosen to stay aloof from government which it sees as "another service provider." Many factors are blamed for causing this shift, including fewer patronage jobs. Candidates use polls to focus on the dwindling number of persons who show up to vote. Increasing court involvement is blamed, as well, for diminishing the role of public sentiment. The authors suggest that the 1960s civil rights movement has morphed into a litigation struggle about rights and a "middle class" prerogative. Reviewer Kerry Lauerman suggested Ginsberg and Crenson "overstate on occasion," such as characterizing the issues of AIDS, breast cancer, and gun violence as "the causes of the comfortable." The reviewer criticized the writing style as sometimes "turgid" but concluded overall that the analysis was "thoughtful and useful", but needed more analysis of the role of the media.
- A review in the Independent Review, a quarterly academic journal, found the writing style to be "well documented" and "analytical," which exposed the "thoroughly corrosive impact of beltway politics on democratic processes and citizen power." The authors suggest that citizens, who used to be the "backbone of the western state," are no longer relevant. While government has grown, influential citizens have been reduced to recipients of government services and "marginalized as political actors." Government can raise an army and collect taxes without widespread public support; the withholding tax has made the voluntary component of tax paying less important; a professional military limits the need for citizen soldiers; special interests provide bureaucrats with a substitute for public support. The authors blame, in part, Progressive Era reforms such as primaries and recalls and referendums as weakening the parties' ability to mobilize voters. Neither party has much enthusiasm for mobilizing more voters. Group conflict dominates, and government is little more than a "broker for competing interests." Inside-the-Beltway regulatory agencies have a huge advantage over colleagues elsewhere. Ginsberg and Crenson think that increased litigation, caused by lowering the requirements for class-action lawsuits, works to the benefit of special interests who can cause changes beneficial to them without having to energize apathetic voters. The reviewer writes: "the authors trace the civil rights, consumer, and environmental movements from their beginnings as popularly based struggles to the narrow group causes they have become today." The reviewer suggested that the authors have "acuity" but neglected to consider that "big government itself" may be the problem. The reviewer criticized the argument as having "fallen short" in some respects by focusing on non-elected public officials skilled at channeling power to special interests. The reviewer thinks elected officials still have incentives to mobilize wider publics and to act responsibly. But the reviewer concluded that American government might become "a Frankenstein's monster of exceptionally powerful officialdom with neither defined goals nor clear responsibility to the American public."

=== The Captive Public ===
- A reviewer from The New York Times evaluated Ginsberg's The Captive Public: How Mass Opinion Promotes State Power 1986. Ginsberg argued that people think they're in control since they vote and answer public opinion polls, but he argues that such control is illusory. He thinks government used tactics such as extending rights of modern citizenship to diverse new groups, such as minorities and women, as well as encouraging voting as an alternative to more dangerous unwanted protests, such as striking or rioting, to tame a wary public. "To vote meant not to strike or riot," and the state preferred citizens to vote rather than mount more serious challenges to its power such as lawsuits, protests, organizing, parliamentary procedure, or lobbying. Schools taught children the benefits of voting with such repetition until it became a "tenacious myth of mass control," in his view. Since elections happen periodically, they limit citizen participation in politics to the selection of leaders and keep people away from policy formation. Ginsberg sees public opinion polling as a "subtle instrument of power" since it renders opinions "less dangerous, less disruptive, more permissive, and, perhaps, more amenable to governmental control." He sees policy based not on mass opinion but on managing mass opinion, a kind of giant public relations project. Reviewer Mark Crispin Miller found Ginsberg's analysis compelling but "a bit too careful to do justice to the complex advertising mechanism that has swallowed up our politics," and found his focus "too narrow", "too simple", with a "libertarian bias." He criticizes Ginsberg's terms as "too crude" such as using "the state" to describe regulatory agencies, and for equating agencies such as the Office of Economic Opportunity with Big Brother. Miller criticized Ginsberg for ignoring the "subtle and extensive interrelationships" between government, corporations, advertising agencies and the mass media. Miller thinks Ginsberg underestimated the public, and "has translated his fellow citizens into a featureless manipulated mass, without fears or desires worth taking seriously."

=== Citizenship, political parties, and polling ===
Ginsberg has criticized the Washington political climate as "toxic", characterized by a "cycle of attack and counterattack" in which minor indiscretions are used as political weapons. Ginsberg sees this as a "structural" problem. While Ginsberg sees voting as a passive and meaningless act which gives the illusion of public control over government, he sometimes criticizes both political parties as having a "resistance" to sincerely working towards increased voter participation. One newspaper reporter, writing about low voter turnout in 1998, suggested there was a "deep-rooted resistance within both parties to expanding the national electorate," and quoted Ginsberg as saying "Politicians who have risen to power in a low-turnout political environment have little to gain and much to fear from an expanded electorate." Ginsberg added when officeholders talk about "getting out the vote," they generally mean their own voters, not non-participants. Ginsberg argued that citizenship has been undermined by a move to a voluntary military. He believes citizen participation in the military is good since it strengthens patriotism, which means "sacrifice and a willingness to die for one's country." But the switch to a voluntary military eliminates "a powerful patriotic framework" since "instead of a disgruntled army of citizen soldiers, the military seems to consist of professional soldiers and private contractors." Ginsberg suggested that the "government learned the lessons of Vietnam and has found ways to insulate the use of military force" from society. Ginsberg criticized American leaders for trying to wage war on terrorism without any sacrifice from citizens: "U.S. leaders have pleaded for what can best be described as defiant normalcy – living, spending and consuming to show that terrorists won't change the American way of life," according to a reporter commenting on Ginsberg's views. Ginsberg has suggested that American political parties have less and less influence.

Ginsberg has commented on campaign strategies; for example, he suggested that a photo of young Bill Clinton shaking the hand of President John F. Kennedy, taken by photographer Arnold Sachs, was used by campaign operatives to reinforce the idea of Clinton as "heir apparent" to the Kennedy legacy. He also commented on the tight presidential primary race between Hillary Clinton and Barack Obama in 2008, and compared the two candidates to "Walmart and Kmart – they're occupying the same space." Ginsberg has a cynical outlook, seeing the Republican Party as courting Jews not for their votes but for their financial contributions. He was quoted as saying: "When the numbers are added up, we will probably find that Jewish money was especially important to the Republicans this year." In another instance, Ginsberg criticized the administration of FDR for the tactic of having federal investigators sift through tax and financial records of opposition politicians. He's known for speaking bluntly about religious politics: for example, he said "Jews have always been the brains, the wallet and the legs of the Democratic Party," in an interview in 2002. Ginsberg participated in panel discussions about polling and democracy.

=== The effect of administrative bloat on universities ===
Ginsberg has been an outspoken critic of the expansion in the number and pay of non-teaching university administrators on campuses throughout the world. As these administrators now outnumber faculty in every university in the U.S., he points out that this is the fundamental reason for rapid tuition increases despite the fact that the faculty to student ratio has remained nearly unchanged and faculty salaries generally track inflation. There is general consensus that Ginsberg's observations are correct with some studies showing that administrators not qualified to be assistant professors in their own discipline are hired to oversee faculty at all levels. These conditions have incited rage in some faculty, yet little has changed at university campuses since the publication of Ginsberg's book. Ginsberg places the blame not only on administrators but also on faculty for ceding their universities to inept administrators. Even critics have said, "Ginsberg rightly points out that numbers of administrators and professional staffers have grown far more quickly than numbers of faculty, pushing up the costs that students and their families pay without enhancing the academic side of their experience."

== Books ==
- American Government
- Democracy: How Direct?: Views from the Founding Era and the Polling Era
- Dissenting Electorate: Those Who Refuse to Vote and the Legitimacy of Their Opposition
- Do the Jews Have a Future in America?
- Essentials of American Politics
- Trumping Democracy
- Let's Talk Soft Drinks: The Story of a Great Industry, 1960.
- Poliscide (co-authored with Theodore J. Lowi), MacMillan Publishing Company, 1976.
- The Consequences of Consent: Elections, Citizen Control And Popular Acquiescence, 1982.
- The Sibling Rivalry Monster, 1985.
- Do Elections Matter? (co-edited with Alan Stone), M. E. Sharpe Publishers, 1986.
- The Captive Public: How Mass Opinion Promotes State Power. Basic Books, 1986.
- American Government: Freedom and Power (co-authored with Theodore J. Lowi), W.W. Norton, 1990. Textbook with numerous reprintings.
- Politics by other means (co-authored with Martin Shefter), Basic Books, 1990.
- Politics by Other Means, The Captive Public (co-authored with Martin Shefter), Basic Books, 1990.
- American Government: Readings and Cases, (co-edited with Theodore J. Lowi and Alice Hearst), W.W. Norton, 1992.
- The Fatal Embrace: Jews and the State, University of Chicago Press, 1993.
- Analyzing American Government, 1994.
- Democrats Return to Power, 1994.
- Embattled Democracy: Politics and Policy in the Clinton Era (co-authored with Theodore J. Lowi), W.W. Norton, 1995.
- We the People: An Introduction to American Politics (co-authored with Theodore J. Lowi and Margaret Weir), W.W. Norton, 1997.
- Electoral deadlock: Politics and policy in the Clinton era, 1999.
- Downsizing Democracy: How America Sidelined Its Citizens and Privatized Its Public (with Matthew Crenson) The Johns Hopkins University Press, 2002.
- Jews in American Politics: Essays, 2003.
- American Government: Power and Purpose, 2004.
- Making Government Manageable: Executive Organization and Management in the 21st Century (co-editor with Thomas H. Stanton) Johns Hopkins University Press, 2004.
- Presidential Power: Unchecked and Unbalanced (co-authored), 2007.
- The American Lie: Government by the People and other Political Fables, 2007.
- Moses of South Carolina: A Jewish Scalawag during Radical Reconstruction (2010) Johns Hopkins University Press ISBN 978-0-8018-9464-0
- Moses of South Carolina: A Jewish Scalawag During Radical Reconstruction (Baltimore; Johns Hopkins University Press; 2010)
- Anti-Semitism on the Campus: Past and Present, 2011.
- The Fall of the Faculty: The Rise of the All-Administrative University and Why It Matters (2011) Oxford University Press
- How the Jews Defeated Hitler: Exploding the Myth of Jewish Passivity in the Face of Nazism, 2013.
- The Value of Violence, 2013.
- The Worth of War, 2014.
- The Worth of War, 2014.
- Presidential Government, 2016.
- What Washington Gets Wrong: The Unelected Officials Who Actually Run the Government and Their Misconceptions about the American People, 2016.
- Analytics, Policy, and Governance, 2017.
- From Antisemitism to Anti-Zionism: The Past & Present of a Lethal Ideology, 2017.
- A Guide to the United States Constitution, 2019.
- American Government: A Brief Introduction, 2019.
- Congress: The First Branch, 2019.
- America's State Governments: A Critical Look at Disconnected Democracies, 2021.
- Speaking Truth to Power: Expertise, Politics and Governance, 2022.
- The Imperial Presidency and American Politics: Governance by Edicts and Coups, 2022.
- Big Brother and the Grim Reaper: Political Life After Death, 2024.
- The Dark Side of Politics, 2024.
- The New American Anti-Semitism: The Left, the Right, and the Jews, 2024.
