= William Christian Hackett =

American novelist, philosopher and translator

William Christian Hackett (born 1979) is an American Catholic philosopher. He is also a translator, involved in the reception of French Phenomenology into English, and a novelist.

His novel Outside the Gates retells the true story of existentialist philosopher Jean Wahl's escape from Drancy Internment Camp and underground flight to the free zone during the German Occupation of France in 1941. Hackett is the translator of Wahl's Human Existence and Transcendence, published in 1944 after his escape, that is partially retold by the novel.

Hackett is a professor of philosophy at Saint Meinrad Seminary and School of Theology in St. Meinrad, Indiana.

== Works ==
=== Fiction ===
- Outside the Gates, Angelico Press, 2021. Honorable Mention. Catholic Media Association Book Awards 2022.

=== Theory ===
- Pascal's Prayers with "The Grandeur and Miser of Man" by Pope Francis. Word on Fire, 2026.
- Anthropomorphism and Christian Theology: The Apophatics of the Sensible. Bloomsbury, 2024.
- Philosophy in Word and Name: Myth, Wisdom, Apocalypse, Angelico Press, 2020.
- Quiet Powers of the Possible: Interviews in Contemporary French Phenomenology, Fordham University Press, 2016. (with Tarek Dika)

=== Translations ===
- From Theology to Theological Thinking, by Jean-Yves Lacoste, University of Virginia Press, 2014 (second edition, 2023).
- God, the Flesh, and the Other: From Irenaeus to Duns Scotus, by Emmanuel Falque, Northwestern University Press, 2014.
- Human Existence and Transcendence, by Jean Wahl, University of Notre Dame Press, 2016.
- Saint Bonaventure and the Entrance of God into Theology, by Emmanuel Falque, St. Bonaventure University Press, 2018. (with Brian Lapsa)
- The Expansion of Metaphysics, by Miklos Vető, Cascade Press, 2018.
