= Michel Henry =

French writer and philosopher

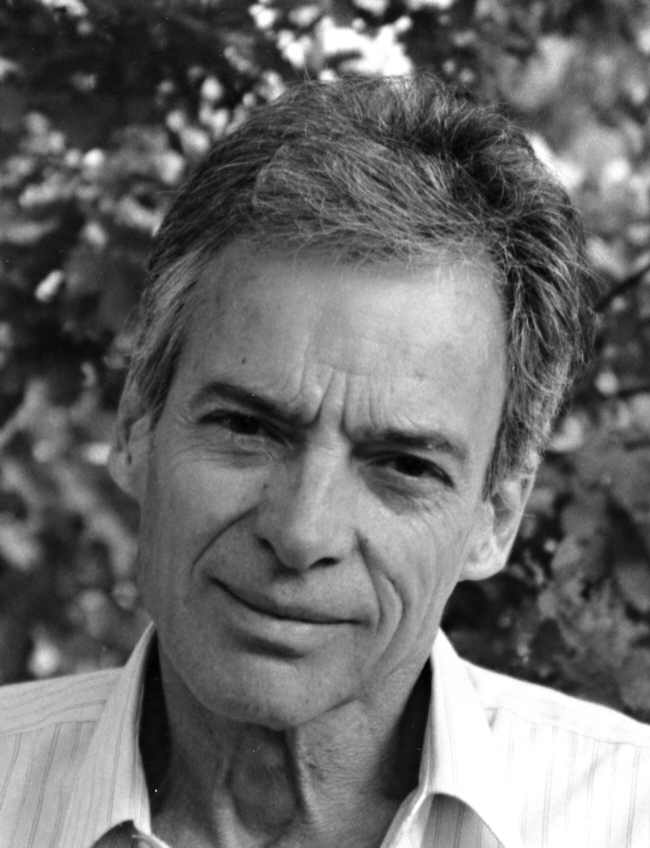
- Michel Henry at the early 1990s
- Born: 10 January 1922; Haiphong, French Indochina (present-day Vietnam)
- Died: 3 July 2002 (aged 80); Albi, France
- Spouse: Anne Pécourt (m. 1958)

Academic background
- Education: École Normale Supérieure; University of Paris (PhD, 1963)
- Thesis: L'essence de la manifestation (1963)
- Doctoral advisor: Jean Wahl

Academic work
- Era: 20th-century philosophy
- Region: Western philosophy
- School or tradition: Continental philosophy Phenomenology
- Institutions: University of Montpellier
- Main interests: Ethics; Philosophy of religion
- Notable ideas: Phenomenology of life, material phenomenology, phenomenological life

Michel Henry (/ɒnˈriː/; French: [ɑ̃ʁi]; 10 January 1922 – 3 July 2002) was a French philosopher, phenomenologist and novelist. He wrote four novels and numerous philosophical works. He also lectured at universities in France, Belgium, the United States, and Japan.

== Biography ==
Michel Henry was born in Haiphong, French Indochina (now Vietnam), and he lived in French Indochina until he was seven years old. Following the death of his father, who was an officer in the French Navy, he and his mother settled in metropolitan France. While studying in Paris, he discovered a true passion for philosophy, which he decided to make his profession—he enrolled at the École Normale Supérieure, at the time part of the University of Paris. From June 1943, he was fully engaged with the French Resistance, joining the maquis of the Haut Jura under the code name of Kant. He often had to come down from the mountains in order to accomplish missions in Nazi-occupied Lyon, an experience of clandestinity that deeply marked his philosophy.

At the end of the war he took the final part of the philosophy examination at the university, following which he wrote a doctoral thesis at the University of Paris in 1963 (but eventually published in 1973), titled L'essence de la manifestation (The Essence of Manifestation), under the direction of Jean Wahl. Other academic advisors included Paul Ricœur, Ferdinand Alquié, and Henri Gouhier. His first book, on the Philosophy and Phenomenology of the Body, was completed in 1950. His first significant published work was on The Essence of Manifestation, to which he devoted long years of necessary research in order to surmount the main deficiency of all intellectualist philosophy, the ignorance of life as experienced.

From 1960, Michel Henry was a professor of philosophy at the University of Montpellier, where he patiently perfected his work, keeping himself away from philosophical fashions and far from dominant ideologies. He died in Albi, France, at the age of eighty.

The sole subject of his philosophy is living subjectivity, which is to say the real life of living individuals. This subject is found in all his work and ensures its deep unity in spite of the diversity of themes he tackled. It has been suggested that he proposed the most profound theory of subjectivity in the Twentieth Century.

== Philosophy ==
=== A phenomenology of life ===
The work of Michel Henry is based on Phenomenology, which is the study of the phenomenon. The English/German/Latinate word "phenomenon" comes from the Greek "phainomenon" which means "that which shows itself by coming into the light". The everyday understanding of phenomenon as appearance is only possible as a negative derivation of this authentic sense of Greek self-showing. The object of phenomenology is not however something that appears, such as a particular thing or phenomena, but the act of appearing itself. Henry's thought led him to a reversal of Husserlian phenomenology, which acknowledges as phenomenon only that which appears in the world, or exteriority. Henry counterposed this conception of phenomenality with a radical phenomenology of life.

Henry defines life from a phenomenological point of view as what possesses the faculty and the power "to feel and to experience oneself in each point of its being". For Henry, life is essentially force and affect; it is essentially invisible; it consists in a pure experience of itself which perpetually oscillates between suffering and joy; thought is for him only a mode of life, because it is not 'thought which gives access to life, but life that allows thought to reach itself'.

According to Henry, life can never be seen from the exterior, as it never appears in the exteriority of the world. Life feels itself and experiences itself in its invisible interiority and in its radical immanence. In the world, we never see life itself, but only living beings or living organisms; we cannot see life in them. In the same way, it is impossible to see another person's soul with the eyes or to perceive it at the end of a scalpel.

Henry's philosophy goes on to aver that we undergo life in a radical passivity, we are reduced to bear it permanently as what we have not wanted, and that this radical passivity of life is the foundation and the cause of suffering. No-one has ever given himself life. At the same time, the simple fact of living, of being alive and of feeling oneself instead of being nothing and of not existing is already the highest joy and the greatest happiness. Suffering and joy belong to the essence of life, they are the two fundamental affective tonalities of its manifestation and of its "pathetic" self-revelation (from the French word pathétique which means capable of feeling something like suffering or joy).

For Henry, life is not a universal, blind, impersonal and abstract substance, it is necessarily the personal and concrete life of a living individual, it carries in it a consubstantial Ipseity which refers to the fact of being itself, to the fact of being a Self. This life is the personal and finite life of men, or the personal and infinite life of God. For Michel Henry, human life is indeed a finite life, because it is marked by a fundamental lack which manifests itself in particular in suffering, in dissatisfaction or in desire.

=== A theory of subjectivity ===
While the question of being regained importance in France in the posterity of Heidegger, and that the question of the subject was revived, Michel Henry has combined the most living contributions of philosophy to produce what remains today the last complete philosophical system. Life or "absolute phenomenological life" is the base or the foundation of this philosophical system, it is its radical presupposition and its "undeductible" principle, and so the essence or the foundation of all truth according to Michel Henry. Life escapes by principle and according to him to any "distanciation", to any transcendence, merging in the unity of a feeling (épreuve in French) the speculative power of a principle and the material presence of an experience.

Being bullied or denied, returning its forces against itself, or on the opposite deploying itself freely as in the art, in the love or in the work, life through its multiple manifestations focalizes all the concerns of Michel Henry's thought. So phenomenology reaches according to Michel Henry its limits, as the "texture" of phenomenality itself and its simple manifestation refers constantly to the inner reality and to the effectivity of life, which it requires as a condition of possibility. This is the meaning of the title of the main work of Michel Henry, The essence of manifestation: the world appears behind a subject, who discovers this space of exteriority only because he is firstly in passive relation with himself, as being living.

But it is important to be precise and even to underline that for Michel Henry, the human is an incarnated being, he is not reduced to a “pure spirit who surveys the world” or to a “disincarnate subject, like the Kantian spectator of the Paralogisms”. And that for him, the subjectivity is identical with the body, which doesn't reduce at all to an external and objective body as it appears into the world, but which is on the opposite and in reality a subjective and living body which reveals itself permanently from the interior through the movement and sensing and by which we can act on the external world.

=== Two modes of manifestation ===
Two modes of manifestation of phenomena exist, according to Henry, which are two ways of appearing: "exteriority", which is the mode of manifestation of the visible world, and phenomenological "interiority", which is the mode of manifestation of invisible life. Our bodies, for instance, are in life given to us from the inside, which allows us, for example, to move our hands, and it also appears to us from the outside like any other object that we can see in the world.

The "invisible", here, does not correspond to that which is too small to be seen with the naked eye, or to radiation to which the eye is not sensitive, but rather to life, which is forever invisible because it is radically immanent and never appears in the exteriority of the world. No one has ever seen a force, a thought or a feeling appear in the world in their inner reality; no one has ever found them by digging into the ground.

Some of his assertions seem paradoxical and difficult to understand at first glance, not only because they are taken out of context, but above all because our habits of thought make us reduce everything to its visible appearance in the world instead of trying to attain its invisible reality in life. It is this separation between visible appearance and invisible reality which allows the dissimulation of our real feelings and which grounds the possibility of sham and hypocrisy, which are forms of lies.

=== The absolute Truth of Life ===
Michel Henry explains in his book I am the Truth. Towards a Philosophy of Christianity what Christianity considers to be the Truth and which he calls "the Truth of Life". He shows that the Christian concept of Truth is opposed to what men habitually consider to be the truth, which originates in Greek thought and which he calls "the truth of the world". But what is truth? Truth is what shows itself and thus demonstrates its reality in its effective manifestation in us or in the world.

The truth of the world designates an external and objective truth, a truth in which everything appears to our gaze in the form of a visible object at a distance from us, i.e. in the form of a representation which is distinct from what it shows: when we look at an apple, it is not the apple in itself that we see but a mere image of the apple that appears in our sensibility and which changes depending on the lighting or the angle from which we view it. In the same way, when we look at a person's face, it is not the person in herself that we see, but only an image of her face, her visible appearance in the world. According to this way of conceiving truth, life is nothing more than a set of objective properties characterised (for example) by the need to feed oneself or one's aptitude for reproduction.

In Christianity, Life is reduced to its internal reality, which is absolutely subjective and radically immanent. Considered in its phenomenological reality, Life is quite simply the faculty and the subjective ability to feel sensations, small pleasures or great hurts, to experience desires and feelings, to move our bodies from within by exerting subjective effort, or even to think. All such faculties possess the fundamental characteristic of appearing and manifesting themselves in themselves, with no gap or distance; we do not perceive them from outside our being or as present to our gaze, but only in us: we coincide with each of these abilities. Life is in itself the power of manifestation and revelation, and what it manifests is itself, in its feeling self-revelation — it is a power of revelation which is perpetually at work within us and which we continually forget.

The Truth of Life is absolutely subjective — that is, it is independent of our subjective beliefs and tastes. The perception of a coloured sensation or a pain, for example, is not a matter of personal preference but a fact and an incontestable inner experience which pertains to the absolute subjectivity of Life. The Truth of Life does not therefore differ in any way from that which it makes true, it is not distinct from that which manifests itself in it. Truth is manifestation itself in its pure inner revelation, and Life is what Christianity calls God.

The Truth of Life is not a relative truth which varies from one individual to another, but absolute Truth which is the inner foundation of each of our faculties and abilities, and which illuminates the least of our impressions. The Truth of Life is not an abstract and indifferent truth; on the contrary, it is that which is most essential for man, as it is this alone that can lead him to salvation in his inner identification with it and in becoming the Son of God, rather than losing himself in the world.

=== God or the essence of life ===
For Michel Henry, God is nothing but the absolute phenomenological life which gives each ego to himself and which reveals to us both suffering and self-enjoyment. He says: "God is Life, he is the essence of Life, or, if one prefers, the essence of life is God. Saying this we already know what God is, we know it not through the effect of some knowledge or learning, we do not know it through thought, against the background of the truth of the world. Rather we know it, and can know it, only in and through Life itself. We can know the essence of God only in God."

In the work of Michel Henry, the word "essence", that he uses frequently, designates only the foundation, the source, the origin and the condition of possibility. This Life is not biological life defined by objective and exterior properties, nor an abstract and empty philosophical concept, but the absolute phenomenological life, a radically immanent life which possesses in it the power of showing itself in itself without distance, a life which reveals permanently itself. A manifestation of oneself and a self-revelation which doesn't consist in the fact of seeing outside oneself or of perceiving the exterior world, but in the fact of feeling and of feeling oneself, of experiencing in oneself its own inner and affective reality.

As Michel Henry says also in this same book, "God is that pure Revelation that reveals nothing other than itself. God reveals Himself. The Revelation of God is his self-revelation". God is in himself revelation, he is the “primordial Revelation that tears everything from nothingness”, a revelation which is the “pathetic self-revelation” and the absolute self-enjoyment of life. As the apostle John says in his first epistle, “God is love”, because “Life loves itself in an infinite and eternal love”.

Michel Henry opposes to the notion of creation, which is the creation of the world, the notion of generation of life. The creation of the world consists in the opening of this exteriority horizon where everything becomes visible. Whereas Life never stops to generate itself and to generate all the livings in its radical immanence, in its absolute phenomenological interiority that is without gap nor distance.

As we are living and by consequence generated continually by the infinite Life of God, as he never stops to give us life, and as we never cease of being born into the eternal present of life by the action in us of this absolute Life, God is for Christianity our Father and we are its beloved Sons, the Sons of the living God. This doesn't only mean that he has created us at the time of our conception or at the beginning of the world, but that he never stops to generate us permanently into Life, that he is always at work in us in the least of our subjective impressions.

=== Evil or self-negation of life ===
For the French philosopher Michel Henry, God is the invisible Life that never stops to generate us and give us to ourselves in its pathetic self-revelation. According to his philosophy of Christianity and according to the founder texts of Christianity, God is Love because Life loves itself in an infinite and eternal love. By consequence life is good in itself. But the fact that life is good doesn't come from a judgment of intentional thought or of any science passed from the exterior of life, it resides on the opposite according to Michel Henry in the immediate and immanent experience of life itself, or more precisely in "the very fact of undergoing experiencing itself", in "the delight of this experience that is its enjoyment of itself".

The evil corresponds to all that denies or attacks life, it finds its origin in what Michel Henry calls “death”, which is “the negation” or “self-negation of life”. This “death” is an inner, affective and spiritual death which is the radical separation from God and his infinite love, and which consists simply in not loving or despising life, in living selfishly as if God didn't exist, as if he was not our Father of us all, and by consequence as if we were not all his beloved Sons and Daughters, as if we were not all Brothers and Sisters generated by a same Life.

According to Henry, the evil peaks in the unlimited violence of hatred that is at the origin of all forms of barbarism, of all the crimes, of all the wars and of all the genocides that ravage the world. However, he also claims that the evil understood as self-negation of life is also the common origin of all those blind processes and of all those false abstractions that lead so many people to misery and exclusion. According to Alain David, a teacher in philosophy at Dijon, Michel Henry has given us the means of really thinking “this unlimited attack on life” that is called “"Crime against humanity" in the after-war political law”, which is for him “one of the most important things for today philosophy”.

=== Art or the resurrection of eternal life ===
For the philosopher Michel Henry, art or the contemplation of the beauty of artworks is not “a separated domain reserved to snobs and to initiated people”. As well as artistic creation is not reserved to professional artists only, it is on the contrary accessible to every human being and to each individual in particular. For him, every “human being is potentially, and perhaps even necessarily, a painter and an artist”, because the possibility of painting is fundamentally written in him in reason of his inner life, of his feeling of oneself and of sensibility he carries in him, as he explains it in his book Seeing the invisible. On Kandinsky. But also because we live permanently our body internally, « coinciding with the exercise of each one of its powers: I see, I hear, I feel, I move my hand and eyes ».

According to Michel Henry, the fundamental goal of art in general, and in particular of music as it is understood by the German philosopher Arthur Schopenhauer or of abstract painting as conceived by its founder Wassily Kandinsky, is simply to use musical means that are sounds or musical notes, as well as pictorial means that are forms and colors, to express “this continual emergence of life” or “its eternally living essence” which is called an emotion. That’s this emotion or this ensemble of emotions that the artist feels in himself and that he wants to share with others and to transmit to the auditor or that he searches to awake in the spectator by means of his musical or pictorial work, “this profusion of life in him, its intensification and exaltation”.

For Michel Henry, who repeats in fact in this book Seeing the invisible. On Kandinsky what he considers as being “one of Schopenhauer’s most important theses”, “music expresses immediately our life, that is, our feelings”. This life or the “core of our being” is for Schopenhauer a “never-ending Desire” which leads it consequently permanently to dissatisfaction and to frustration, because no object can fulfill it. The human existence, which is both laminated and defined in his eye by such an infinite desire, is essentially Suffering.

But music expresses our inner life and our feelings without relation to an external world or to any representation, music realizes it simply in ordering sounds in order to “reproduce the history of our unhappy existence”, a tormented existence that aspires fundamentally to find relief or “absence of trouble”, and perhaps also the simple “happiness of living”, “throughout the long sequence of disillusions and chagrins”. According to Michel Henry, that’s melody that accomplishes immediately this “revelation of our suffering existence” by “distancing itself from the fundamental tone”, or which allows, on the contrary, the “realization or mere abolition of desire” with “its ultimate return to the tone on the final chord”. And who accomplishes this revelation through “the expressive power of music”, through its both slow and sad rhythm or through its faster and joyful rhythm, and through “its miraculous ability to disclose the immense domain of our feelings with their many nuances”.

But for Michel Henry, “a feeling can never be assimilated to an external event in the world, to a fact individuated in space and time, which is destined to slide into the past and disappear”, except if it is “confused with its occasional cause in the world”: a feeling is on the opposite according to him an “original experience” of life itself, “that’s to say of an absolute subjectivity” whose affectivity resides precisely “in its immediate self-revelation”.

In the same way, for the painter and art theoretician Wassily Kandinsky, the function of abstract painting is no longer to give us to see or to represent the external world or the objects it contains, as was the case with figurative painting of the eighteenth and nineteenth centuries, which is often without real interest on an esthetical or emotional point of view, but on the contrary, as with music, to express or more precisely to “show into the visible light” our inner life, our sensations, our passions and our emotions.

In order to reach expressing the “invisible feelings” or “the hidden emotions of our soul”, abstract painting disposes simply, according to Michel Henry, of the “basic elements of all painting” which are “linear forms and colours”, which the painter will dispose or draw on the surface of the paper sheet, of the wood panel or of the linen canvas he uses as material support. But each line concretely drawn by the artist is fundamentally, according to Michel Henry, the product of a subjective force that this one deploys internally with his arm and with his whole subjective body at the surface of the support, and which he exerts with his hand on his pencil or on his paintbrush, softly or with violence.

The subjective impression, the “pathetic stir” or the inner and purely subjective effect produced by this short line or by this longer line on the sensibility of those who take the time to observe it attentively and who make the effort to follow its movement with his or her sight and with their hand, varies obviously according to the width of the line and its length, according to its curvature or its breaks, but also according to its inclination or its position on the material support and according to the other neighbouring forms who surround it.

In addition to the colours which he uses pure, as they come out of the paint tube, or those which he obtains by mixing several pure colours between them, the choice of each one of them, for Michel Henry, by the painter or the artist, is due to the emotional power that it possesses, a power which is due simply to the “inherent affective tonality” of the colour, its “resonance” or its “sonority”, as stated also by Kandinsky. In other words, it is due to the “purely subjective impression” which pure or mixed colours make on us, once we give some more attention to look at them than usual, without any utilitarian reason.

And as Michel Henry writes about the contemplation of Kandinsky’s abstract or figurative paintings, about his ink drawings or his wood engravings, but also more generally about the contemplation of every possible form of painting, of drawing, of engraving or of sculpture: “So if we are essentially force and affect, then lines and colours allow the luminous emergence of our deepest being.”

For Michel Henry as well as for Kandinsky, the true mission of art in general, and of painting and music in particular, is simply to exert an “inner” or “spiritual” action on the soul, that’s to say in reality an action on the interiority of life, on affectivity and on the feeling who habits us permanently, a spiritual action which is fundamentally to allow abandoned men and women of our time to find in themselves the “path to eternal life” and “to arrive at happiness”.

Because life is not only for Michel Henry “a pure experience of oneself”, it is also according to him and “as its direct result, the growth of the self”. A “growth of the self” which simply consists to the fact of “experiencing oneself more intensely” and so of “enjoying oneself”. Because life is not for Michel Henry something of static or fixed, it is on the opposite according to him a kind of internal and eternal movement, it is “the eternal movement of the passage from Suffering to Joy”. That’s why he often speaks in his writings about this “enlarged” or “magnified” life which leads the culture of life.

According to Michel Henry, “life’s experience of itself” or the “feeling of oneself that brings life to itself” is “a primal Suffering”, that true art and authentic culture of life, understood as “self-transformation” or as “self-development of life”, can lead to “the enjoyment and to the exaltation of oneself”. This is precisely this eternal passage always restarted from lack or dissatisfaction, from Desire or Suffering to a deep inner Joy and to an unlimited inner happiness that Michel Henry calls “the resurrection of eternal life”, in the conclusion of his book Seeing the invisible. On Kandinsky.

=== Critique of Western philosophy ===
Western philosophy as a whole since its Greek origins recognizes only the visible world and exteriority as the sole form of manifestation. It is trapped into what in The Essence of Manifestation Michel Henry calls "ontological monism"; it completely ignores the invisible interiority of life, its radical immanence and its original mode of revelation which is irreducible to any form of transcendence or to any exteriority. When subjectivity or life are in question, they are never grasped in their purity; they are systematically reduced to biological life, to their external relation with the world, or as in Husserl to an intentionality, i.e. an orientation of consciousness towards an object outside it.

Henry rejects materialism, which admits only matter as reality, because the manifestation of matter in the transcendence of the world always presupposes life's self-revelation, whether in order to accede to it, or to be able to see it or touch it. He equally rejects idealism, which reduces being to thought and is in principle incapable of grasping the reality of being which it reduces to an unreal image, to a simple representation. For Michel Henry, the revelation of the absolute resides in affectivity and is constituted by it.

The deep originality of Michel Henry's thought and its radical novelty in relation to all preceding philosophy explains its fairly limited reception. It is however a philosophy that is admired for its "rigor" and its "depth". But his thought is both "difficult" and "demanding", despite the simplicity and immediacy of its central and unique theme of phenomenological life, the experience of which it tries to communicate. It is the immediacy and absolute transparency of life which explains the difficulty of grasping it as a thought: it is much easier to speak of what we see than of this invisible life, which fundamentally avoids being seen from the outside.

== Reception of Henry's philosophy ==
His thesis on The Essence of Manifestation was warmly welcomed by the members of the jury, who recognized the intellectual value and the seriousness of its author, although this thesis did not have any influence on their later works, as written by Alain David: “All the members of the jury (except perhaps Jean Wahl) have remained riveted, in their work on the history of philosophy or general philosophy, on the notion of the horizon and the world. The same goes for later readers, who are often admiring though. Everyone recognizes his exceptional power at work, without this recognition leading to questioning, or even generating emulators or disciples. And he adds that in comparison with the fate of other famous theses, such as The phenomenology of perception, Words and things or Totality and infinity, “The essence of manifestation remains a solitary work, mentioned but rarely quoted, and not involving the upheaval one might expect.”

His book on Marx was rejected by Marxists, who were harshly criticized, as well as by those who refused to see in Marx a philosopher and who reduced him to an ideologue responsible from Marxism. His book on Barbarism was considered by some as a rather simplistic and overly trenchant “anti-scientific” and “technophobic” discourse. Nevertheless, it seems that science and technology too often pursue their blind and unrestrained development in defiance of life.

It is in particular on these Henryian presuppositions of subjectivity at work that Ghislain Deslandes nevertheless built his phenomenology and his "critique of the managerial condition". He explains in particular that with Michel Henry, “work is presented as the very power to create value and therefore cannot, in itself, be compared to any other value in particular. It is precisely the place where the economy can think of itself from an outside where the being of the action itself is produced. We are here at the opposite of the economic analysis of work, according to which it is a value among others, but treated as a negative magnitude – hence the notion of disutility, or negative utility, in economics. (...) For Michel Henry, on the other hand, work is conceived as the condition of possibility for all forms of organization of the economy, as well as for the economic universe itself.”

The philosopher Renaud Barbaras criticizes the phenomenological definition of life as “auto-affection” proposed by Michel Henry. According to Renaud Barbaras, “life occupies [indeed] a singular place within phenomenology”, whether in its founder Husserl, in Heidegger, in Merleau-Ponty or in Michel Henry. Life is for him at “the heart of the great phenomenologies”, and finally “what they seek to think”. But it is according to him very difficult “to put in evidence a phenomenological concept of life” in these authors, because “life is never thought for itself”. What would suppose indeed according to him taking into account “the activity of a living organism struggling with an exterior milieu” or with its environment? Even if in his phenomenology of life, Michel Henry defines fundamentally life as “pure auto-affection”, that’s to say as being “in essence foreign to exteriority or transcendence”, since it is defined precisely, for Michel Henry, “by the fact that it relates only to itself.” A life fundamentally foreign to the world, which appears in fact to Renaud Barbaras as being “an exhausted life” or as “a life deserted by the living”.

The philosopher Renaud Barabas considers actually that the fundamental effect of life is not what Michel Henry calls “the plenitude of life”, “the embrace of oneself” or also “auto-affection”, but on the opposite “the quest” or “the desire” of the other, “the separation” or “hetero-affection”. A Desire which manifests itself for him in a privileged way in “the amorous desire or more simply [in] love”. For Renaud Barbaras, the essence of affectivity is actually desire, that’s to say what allows “to welcome every content” or “the very form of receptivity”. As he sums it up in one sentence, at the conclusion of his chapter on Desire as essence of the living: “Insofar as it is Desire, life is the place of all feeling and of all experience, it is Affectivity”.

Catherine Meyor, Doctor of Educational Sciences at the University of Laval (Quebec) who teaches the foundations of education, has written a fundamental book on Affectivity in education, which is based on a phenomenological approach to affectivity, and which is largely based on the philosophical work of Michel Henry. It offers a critique of the main approaches or current perspectives for understanding affectivity in the context of education: 1) the functional or behaviourist approach, for which sensitivity or individuality, existence or consciousness have no methodological value; 2) the instrumental or cognitivist approach, "which reduces affectivity to the role of a tool or means", "an exclusively academic instrument placed at the service of the cognitive" through the notion of motivation, and which does not actually grants it no proper value; 3) and finally the therapeutic or curative approach which is that of psychoanalysis or existential-humanistic psychology, which simply aims "to treat the physical and/or psychic disorders of an individual in order to cure him of his ailments", by completely obscuring the strictly cultural dimension of life.

According to Catherine Meyor, “the functional, instrumental and therapeutic statuses seem to obscure, in part or in whole, this property which is nevertheless unavoidable and inalienable in affective experience, its sensitive essence. This eviction poses a problem and this insofar as registering ourselves in the lived experience already lets us perceive the evidence of sensitivity”. This leads her to formulate the main and fundamental objective of her book: “It is to the enhancement of this evidence that our subject will be devoted; returning to sensitivity will take us discursively along a renewed path of approach to affectivity and towards the enunciation of its sensitive status, for the time being still unformulated”. As Catherine Meyor writes again, at the conclusion of a section devoted to the questioning of educational approaches to affectivity: “This subjectivity which passes through the modes of sensitivity in order to make itself felt and to experience itself, which is fundamentally affectivity: feeling and desire constitutive of the world, which is also the first point of culture, which is full presence working for its own amplification, which also exceeds itself, which, in a classic word, condenses the "human condition", it is there, below and beyond any functional and therapeutic mode, what interests us, since both "in" and "after" managerial approaches, it remains intact and brilliant, undamaged by the trials of its resolution.”

His works on Christianity seem rather to have disappointed certain professional theologians and Catholic exegetes, who contented themselves with picking out and correcting what they considered as "dogmatic errors". His phenomenology of life was the subject of a pamphlet on Le tournant théologique de la phénoménologie française (The Theological Turn in French Phenomenology) by Dominique Janicaud, who sees in the immanence of life only “the affirmation of a tautological interiority”. On the other hand, Antoine Vidalin published in 2006 a book entitled La parole de la Vie (The Word of Life) in which preface the Professor at the Institut d'Etudes Théologiques from Brussels Jean-Marie Hennaux says that Michel Henry's phenomenology of life "allows for a renewed approach to every area of theology" and that his philosophy "will allow the renewal and deepening of many theological questions".

As Alain David says in an article published in the French journal Revue philosophique de la France et de l'étranger (number 3, July – September 2001), the thought of Michel Henry seems so radical, it affects our habitual ways of thinking so deeply, that it has had a difficult reception, even if all his readers declare themselves impressed by its "power", by the "staggering effect" of a thought which "sweeps everything clean on its way through", which "prompts admiration", but nevertheless "doesn’t really convince", as we don't know whether we are confronted by "the violence of a prophetic voice or by pure madness". In the same journal, Rolf Kühn also asserts, in order to explain the difficult reception of Michel Henry's work, that "if we do not side with any power in this world, we inevitably submit to silence and to criticism from every possible power, because we remind each institution that its visible or apparent power is, in fact, only powerlessness, because nobody gives himself over to absolute phenomenological life".

His books have been translated into many languages, notably English, German, Spanish, Italian, Portuguese and Japanese. A substantial amount of work has been dedicated to him, mainly in French, but also in German, Spanish and Italian. A number of international seminars have also been dedicated to the thought of Michel Henry in Beirut, Cerisy, Namur, Prague, Montpellier, Paris and Louvain-la-Neuve in 2010. Michel Henry is considered by the specialists who know his work and recognize its value as one of the most important contemporary philosophers, and his phenomenology of life has started to gain a following. A Michel Henry Study Center has been established at St Joseph's University in Beirut (Lebanon) under the direction of Professor Jad Hatem.

Since 2006, the archives of the philosopher have been deposited by his wife at the Catholic University of Louvain (Belgium), where they form the Michel Henry Archives Fund, placed under the direction of Jean Leclercq. An annual review, called Revue internationale Michel Henry, is also edited by this Fund in collaboration with the Presses universitaires de Louvain since 2010.

A newsletter on Michel Henry mainly in French, called La gazette d'Aliahova (in reference to the town of Aliahova described in the Michel Henry novel L'Amour les yeux fermés), has been published every month by Roland Vaschalde since 2010. The goal of this publication is to keep informed of the articles, books, courses, seminars and meetings on the thought of Michel Henry.

== Consequences of Henry's philosophy ==
=== On phenomenology and life ===
==== The Essence of Manifestation (1963) ====
This book on The essence of manifestation is a work particularly long and dense, often very technical and of a difficult access, as it contains more than 900 pages in its French version. So it is in principle rather destined to students in philosophy, to specialists and to professional philosophers. The lengthy introduction of this difficult book is devoted to the fundamental philosophical problem of the Being of the ego.

The problem of the Being of the ego

In his fundamental book on The essence of manifestation, the purpose of Michel Henry is to put into light and to understand from a philosophical and phenomenological point of view (and not only from a psychological point of view, which just lacks any “philosophical foundation”) which is “the meaning of the Being of the ego”, that's to say what we understand precisely when we say about ourselves: “me, I”. However, the true object of first and fundamental research is not for Michel Henry the ego himself, but « the Being into and by which the ego can appear to existence and acquire his own Being ». Michel Henry says that first philosophy is identical with a universal ontology, because ontology is the science that studies Being in general, and it is necessarily universal as its object isn't such thing in particular or such kind of things, but what conditions them all equally.

In his Metaphysical meditations, Descartes began a first philosophical research, that's to say free from any prejudice and any historical tradition. The ego cogito (or the affirmation “I think, so I am”) is undeniable evidence or a first truth, so it is for Michel Henry the starting point and the true beginning of knowledge. The consciousness which manifests itself in the cogito is not only according to Michel Henry a region of Being, but Being itself, the absolute Being or more precisely “the foundation of Being in general”. This “absolute ego” is nothing for Michel Henry but the transcendental life itself, considered as the origin of all that is given to consciousness in the transcendence.

The problem of the Being of the ego is in fact identical for Michel Henry to that to know how the ego can become a “phenomenon”, that's to say can appear in front of us in the light of the world, under the appearance of a “transcendental field” understood as “the origin of Being, of its different meanings and of its diverse structures”. The phenomenological reduction or epoke, which supposes to put into parenthesis all what we see and all the things we feel with our senses, that's to say the work of transcendence, to retain only the pure fact of appearing, is precisely for Michel Henry the “ "radical" method that allows to grasp the pure self and the life which belongs to him as a transcendental life, to which the world is immanent as an intentional component”. The “transcendence” is the power which deploys the horizon of visibility where any Being can manifest itself and so become a « phenomenon ».

However the ego doesn't become a « phenomenon » according to Michel Henry by becoming “visible” in the transcendence of the world, but on the opposite by remaining permanently in a “sphere of radical immanence”. The immanence is for him a pure revelation or an original revelation which owes nothing to the work of transcendence. The foundation or the essence of manifestation is for Michel Henry an “original immanent revelation” which reduces itself to a “pure presence to itself”, even if such a presence remains “invisible”, because it never appears in the exteriority of the visible world. The goal of this work of Michel Henry on the essence of manifestation is “to show the existence of an absolute knowledge” which doesn't depend of any philosophical or other progress, and which is “the medium of existence itself, the essence of life”.

==== Material Phenomenology (1990) ====
“Material phenomenology” is another name by which Michel Henry designated his radical phenomenology of life, to which development he has devoted his whole philosophical work. The object of material phenomenology is the subjective life of living individuals understood in its pathetic and affective reality as pure impression. As he wrote in the introduction of his book Material Phenomenology: “To radicalize the question of phenomenology is not only to aim for a pure phenomenality but to seek out the mode according to which it originally becomes a phenomenon -- the substance, the stuff, the phenomenological matter of which it is made, its phenomenologically pure materiality. That is the task of material phenomenology.”.

This book by Michel Henry on material phenomenology is constituted of three studies on the “question of phenomenology”, and each of these studies poses this question in its own way. The first study tries to show how material phenomenology distinguishes from classical or historical phenomenology about the problem of time, which allows to Husserl to “think how consciousness manifests itself, that’s to say phenomenality itself”. A problem to which he searches a solution into intentionality, which delivers according to Michel Henry the self-revelation of absolute subjectivity to the “anonymous”, depriving it “of every assignable phenomenological status”.

The second study is devoted to “the phenomenological method”. It seeks to demonstrate that classical or historical phenomenology is confronted with the “impossibility of providing theoretical knowledge of absolute subjectivity”. According to Michel Henry, this demonstrates that “transcendental life withdraws from every intentional approach, from evidence, and from the ‘pure seeing’ of phenomenological reduction”. The “extraordinary” and unconscious path taken by Husserl's thought in its attempt to overcome this aporia constitutes, for Michel Henry, “the striking proof of the non-ekstatic status of life”; that is, the fact that life never manifests itself in the exteriority of a seeing.

The third study is composed of two texts from Michel Henry devoted to the fundamental philosophical problem of the “experience of the other” and on community. According to him, the experience of the other and by consequence the relation to others doesn't funds on intentionality or on “the opening to the alterity of a world”, but on the opposite on life which provides paradoxically “the milieu or the medium in which all possible intersubjectivity can take place”. For this is in the “experience of a radically immanent subject that life arrives to itself”, individuals can communicate between them only because they are living and possess a common origin, “a common birth, a shared essence”.

=== On the body and subjectivity ===
==== Philosophy and Phenomenology of the Body (1965) ====
The different philosophical systems all agreed, despite the diversity of their theories concerning the body, on the decisive doctrine of the belonging of the body to the being of the world. The first and the unique philosopher who understood the necessity of determining originally or fundamentally our body as a 'subjective body' is Maine de Biran, who Michel Henry calls a 'prince of thought', and who deserves according to him to be considered as well as Descartes and Husserl as one of the true founders of a phenomenological science of human reality.

According to Maine de Biran, the being or the reality of the ego does not reside in the immobility of substance-thought, as in the cogito of Descartes, but in the inner experience of a personal and purely subjective effort in its accomplishment. This is with this personal and purely subjective effort that begins and ends, according to Maine de Biran, the very being of the ego or its inner reality. The being or the true reality of the ego is no longer reduced to a pure thought whose nature is limited to the external knowledge of extension and to the contemplation of the external world. According to Maine de Biran, the ego is first a power that manifests itself in the subjective effort he accomplishes at each time, so that the cogito does not have for him the signification of being an 'I think' but on the opposite of being an 'I can'.

The depth of the philosophy of Maine de Biran resides according to Michel Henry in the affirmation that the true being of the movement, but also of the action and of the power of the ego is accurately that of a cogito or of a subjectivity. According to Michel Henry, the philosophical and ontological consequences of this thesis are infinite. By affirming like this the belonging of the true being of movement to what Michel Henry calls the "sphere of the absolute immanence of subjectivity", Maine de Biran proposes in reality "an entirely new theory" of the way whose knowledge of movement is given to us. This knowledge of movement is that of the personal and immanent experience that everyone does of its own subjective body and of its own life. Consequently, movement is known to us in both an inner and immediate way, which consequently concerns an absolute certainty.

Michel Henry is finally led at the end of his reflection to distinguish three different bodies: 1) The original being of the subjective body, which is the absolute body of subjectivity as revealed in the internal experience of the movement, and which possesses the immediate power to move its organs and knows this power with an inner and immanent knowledge; this subjective body is a fundamental 'I can' and its being is a pure revelation of itself. 2) The organic body, which is the immediate and moving terminus of the subjective body, or rather the ensemble of the termini over which movement has a hold; it is the transcendent medium that gives up to the effort of our movement; it is divided into various transcendent masses whose unity is provided by the subjective body. 3) The transcendent or objective body, which manifests in the external world, where it appears with the signification of being mine; the objective body can be the theme of scientific research; this is the only body known by the philosophical tradition.

According to Michel Henry, the world consists in the totality of the contents of all experiences that can live or feel our subjective body, it is in reality the terminus or the limit of all our real, possible and imaginable movements that we can accomplish. The power of acting, that Michel Henry also calls the habit, is finally the real and concrete possibility of a world being given to us, it is a "possibility of knowledge in general". The world is the terminus or the outcome of all our subjective power and of all our habits, and it is for this reason that we are truly its inhabitants. The body is however not an instantaneous knowledge, it is on the contrary a permanent knowledge which coincides with our own existence, so that we can say that the subjective body as a whole is memory. As underlined by Michel Henry, "habit is the foundation for memory", which significates that the original being of the subjective body is a "possibility of knowledge in general", that's to say a knowledge or a memory of the world in its absence, and consequently an immanent memory of its forms.

==== Genealogy of Psychoanalysis (1985) ====
Michel Henry undertook a study of the historical and philosophical genesis of psychoanalysis in the light of phenomenology of life in Généalogie de la psychanalyse, le commencement perdu (Genealogy of Psychoanalysis, the Lost Beginning), in which he shows that the Freudian notion of the unconscious results from the inability of Freud, its founder, to think the essence of life in its purity as affectivity and auto-affection. The repressed representation does not come from the unconscious, it is simply unformed: the unconscious is only an empty representation, it does not exist—or rather, the real unconscious is life itself in its pathetic reality. And it is not repression that provokes anguish, whose existence depends on the mere fact of power, but unused psychic energy or libido. As for the notion of consciousness, it simply means the power of seeing, it is nothing but a consciousness of the object which leads to an empty subjectivity.

==== The Book of the Dead (not published) ====
Henry's planned last book was entitled Le Livre des Morts (The Book of the Dead) and would have dealt with what he called "clandestine subjectivity": a theme which evokes the condition of life in the modern world and which also alludes to his commitment to the Resistance and his personal experience of clandestinity.

=== On economy and politics ===
==== Marx (1976) ====
Michel Henry wrote an important work on Karl Marx, whom he considers, paradoxically, as one of the leading Christian thinkers and one of the most important western philosophers, due to the weight he gives in his thought to living work and to the living individual (praxis) in which he sees the foundation of economic reality. One reason why Marx's genuine thought has been so misunderstood is the complete ignorance of his fundamental philosophical writings during the development of the official doctrine of Marxism, due to their very late publication — for example, The German Ideology only appeared in 1932.

But the real reason for ignorance of Marx's philosophical texts is Marxism's negation, from its earliest days, of subjectivity, because Marxism is nothing other than a repetition of Hegelianism, which is a philosophy of objectivity which reduces the individual to the effective becoming of the Absolute and its manifestation in the light of ek-static exteriority. This work on Marx was published in two volumes entitled respectively Marx I. Une philosophie de la réalité and Marx II. Une philosophie de l’économie, translated in English as Marx: A Philosophy of Human Reality. The reading of Marx by Michel Henry starts by putting Marxism into parenthesis because Michel Henry considers that "Marxism is the whole of the misinterpretations that have been done about Marx".

==== From Communism to Capitalism (1990) ====
Communism and Capitalism are for Michel Henry two faces of the one death, which consists of the negation of life. Communism eliminates individual life in favour of universal abstractions like society, people, history or social classes. Marxism is according to Michel Henry a form of fascism, i.e. a doctrine which originates in the degradation of the individual whose elimination is considered as legitimate, whereas capitalism substitutes economic entities such as money, profit or interest for the real needs of life.

Capitalism however recognizes life as a source of value, wages being the objective representation of real subjective and living work. But capitalism progressively gives way to the exclusion of subjectivity by modern technology, which replaces living work by automated technological processes, eliminating at one stroke the power of creating value and ultimately value itself: possessions are produced in abundance, but unemployment increases and there is a continual shortage of money to buy them. These themes are developed in Du communisme au capitalisme, théorie d’une catastrophe (From Communism to Capitalism, Theory of a Catastrophe).

The initial title of this book should have been The two faces death, but this title has been refused by the editor 'for obvious reasons of international actuality', as confided Michel Henry in an interview with Olivier Salazar-Ferrer published in 1991 in the Agones review.

==== Socialism According to Marx (2008) ====
This small posthumous book of about 100 pages from Michel Henry, translated in English under the title Marx: an introduction (Bloomsbury Academic, 2019), is an introduction to the reading of his more complete and more voluminous book on Marx of 1000 pages and in 2 large volumes published in 1976. It is composed of the texts of several articles or conferences from Michel Henry dedicated to the theme of socialism as understood by Marx, first of all, an "Introduction to the thought of Marx", in which Michel Henry proposes us to “read Marx for the first time”, to do a philosophical reading of his writings which consists simply in doing a “return to the original intuitions of Marx” and in living again in us these fundamental philosophical intuitions. And above all to “take Marx seriously”, abandoning the Marxist interpretative framework, that “makes screen, according to him, between Marx and us”, notably because of the occultation by Marxism of the “individual and concrete subjective determinations” and their replacement by “transcendent masses” and by “abstractions” like “the society, the history, the class, the State, production, consumption, etc…”.

Michel Henry proposes also, in this first article, to “distinguish, very schematically, three groups of texts” in Marx's writings: first of all “the youth writings written until 1845” in which Marx separates progressively himself from Hegel and Feuerbach philosophy in doing a radical critique of their ideological concepts of man, of alienation or of individual, which are for Marx only simple representations “in an act of thought”, leading us to “the concrete [and so purely subjective] life of real individual”; secondly “the historical-political texts” such as The manifest of communist party or The struggle of classes “which have given birth to Marxism”, which has consequently retained in the work of Marx “only what could be useful to political action and its problems”; and lastly “the economic or rather economic-philosophical texts” like the Grundrisse and The Capital, where are elaborated “the fundamental concepts of Marx thought” and which form according to Michel Henry a genuine “first philosophy”, which opposes radically to Hegelianism as well as to Marxism.

In the second article of this small book, which is untitled "Life and death: Marx and Marxism", Michel Henry dissociates carefully “the philosophy of subjective and living praxis” of Marx in which life is “essentially dynamism, movement, effort, tension and overtaking of oneself”, from Marxism or “from the ideologies and systems where life has lost itself”, and that Michel Henry considers as being nothing in reality but “death”. The economic and political failure of Marxism, which has conducted for example 1920’s Russia to a “political dictatorship” and to an “economic collapse”, is not at all for Michel Henry a “simple consequence of Marx own thought”, but results on the opposite according to him from the “ignorance” and the “incomprehension” of the real thought of Marx.

In the third article of this book, which is untitled "Productive forces and subjectivity", Michel Henry explains to us in particular that for Marx, “value is produced exclusively by subjective and living work” in capitalism, which is by definition “the system of value, of its development and of its maintenance”, and that in capitalism as well, “subjectivity forms the essence of production”, that’s to say its foundation or its condition of possibility. Even if life “retires progressively from production in order to return to itself” through the “free development of individualities” and of “their spiritual needs” in “a coming [and really] socialist universe”, “because we assist, for him and according to Marx, to the end of merchant economy” because of the progressive and trend elimination of “subjective and living work” from the production process by machines and modern technology.

For Michel Henry, a really socialist society is actually “1° a superabundance society, 2° in which the living praxis is no longer occupied to production”. Michel Henry opposes radically the real socialism as understood by Marx, in which “superabundance” designates nothing but the “freedom” of “living praxis” and individuals, to its reduction to the “socialization of the means of production” in the Marxist ideology, which leads most often to “shortage on the material level” and whose content reduces in practice only to “police” and to “bureaucracy”. For Michel Henry, real socialism according to Marx derives necessarily from capitalism and from its inherent “internal contradiction” which results precisely from this “reciprocal exclusion of living subjectivity and production”, that’s to say in fact from this progressive elimination of living subjectivity from production while it is in reality its true foundation.

=== On culture and barbarism ===
==== Barbarism (1987) ====
In his book Barbarism, Michel Henry examines the link that exists between barbarism and science or modern technology, from their opposition to culture understood as self-development of sensibility and of inner or purely subjective life of living individuals. Science is founded on the idea of a universal and as such objective truth, which therefore leads to the elimination of the sensible qualities of the world, sensibility and life. There is nothing wrong with science in itself as long as it is restricted to the study of nature, but it tends to exclude all traditional forms of culture, such as art, ethics and religion. Science left to its own devices leads to technology, whose blind processes develop themselves independently in a monstrous fashion with no reference to life.

Science is a form of culture in which life denies itself and refuses itself any value. It is a practical negation of life, which develops into a theoretical negation in the form of ideologies that reduces all possible knowledge to that of science, such as the human sciences whose very objectivity deprives them of their object: what value do statistics have faced with suicide, what do they say about the anguish and the despair that produce it? These ideologies have invaded the university, and are precipitating it to its destruction by eliminating life from research and teaching. Television is the truth of technology; it is the practice par excellence of barbarism: it reduces every event to current affairs, to incoherent and insignificant facts.

This negation of life results, according to Michel Henry, from the "disease of life", from its secret dissatisfaction with the self which leads it to deny itself, to flee itself in order to escape its anguish and its own suffering. In the modern world, we are almost all condemned from childhood to flee our anguish and our proper life in the mediocrity of the media universe — an escape from self and dissatisfaction which leads to violence — rather than resorting to the most highly developed traditional forms of culture which enable the overcoming of this suffering and its transformation into joy. Culture subsists, despite everything, but in a kind of incognito; in our materialist society, which is sinking into barbarism, it must necessarily operate in a clandestine way.

==== Seeing the Invisible: On Kandinsky (1988) ====
Michel Henry was a student of ancient painting and of the great classical painting which preceded the scientistic figuration of the 18th and 19th Centuries, and also of abstract creations such as those of the painter Wassily Kandinsky. Henry dedicated a book entitled Voir l’invisible (Seeing the Invisible) to Kandinsky, in which he describes his work in laudatory terms. He analyses Kandinsky's theoretical writings on art and painting in their spiritual and cultural dimensions as a means of self-growth and refinement of one's sensibility. He explores painting's means of form and colour, and studies their effects on the inner life of one who looks at them filled with wonder, following the rigorous and almost phenomenological analysis proposed by Kandinsky. He explains that every form of painting capable of moving us is in reality abstract, i.e. it is not content to reproduce the world but seeks to express the invisible power and invisible life that we are. He also evokes the great thoughts of Kandinsky, the synthesis of arts, their unity in monumental art, and the cosmic dimension of art.

=== On religion and Christianity ===
==== I Am the Truth (1996) ====
In his book I Am the Truth: Towards a Philosophy of Christianity, Michel Henry confronts his phenomenology of life with the foundational texts of Christianity. Life loves itself with an infinite love and never ceases to engender itself; it never ceases to engender each one of us as its beloved Son or Daughter in the eternal presence of life. Life is nothing but this absolute love that religion calls God. That is why Life is sacred, and it is for this reason that no one has the right to assault another or attack another's life.

The problem of evil is that of the inner and phenomenological "death" of the apparently or externally "living" individuals who do it; that is in reality, of the inner, affective and spiritual degeneration from their original condition of Son of God, when the life they carry in them "turns against itself" in the terrible phenomena of hate and resentment. Because as John says in his first epistle, anyone who does not love remains in death, whereas everyone who loves has been born of God. The commandment of love is not an ethical law, but Life itself.

This work also proposes a phenomenology of Christ, who is understood as the First Living Being. A living being is simply that which succeeds in the pure revelation of self or self-revelation that is Life. It is in the form of an effective and singular Ipseity that Life never ceases to engender itself. It never ceases to occur in the form of a singular Self that embraces itself, experiences itself and finds joy in itself, and that Michel Henry calls the First Living Being. Or again the Arch-Son, as he himself inhabits the Origin and the Beginning, and is engendered in the very process whereby the Father engenders himself.

Michel Henry tells us in this book that the purpose of the coming of Christ into the world is to make the true Father manifest to people, and thus to save them from the forgetting of Life in which they stand. A forgetting which leads them falsely to believe themselves as being the source of their own powers, their own pleasures and their own feelings, and to live in the terrifying lack of that which however gives each ego to itself. The plenitude of life and the feeling of satisfaction it brings must yield to the great Rift, to the Desire that no object can fulfil, to the Hunger that nothing can satisfy.

==== Incarnation: A Philosophy of Flesh (2000) ====
In his book Incarnation: A Philosophy of Flesh, Henry starts by opposing the sensible and living flesh as we experience it perpetually from the inside to the inert and material body as we can see it from the outside, like other objects we find in the world. The flesh does not correspond at all, in his terminology, to the soft part of our material and objective body as opposed for example to the bones, but to what he called in his earlier books our subjective body. For Henry, an object possesses no interiority, it is not living, it does not feel itself and does not feel that it is touched, it does not subjectively experience being touched.

Having put the difficult problem of the incarnation in a historical perspective by going back to the thought of the Church Fathers, he undertakes a critical re-reading of the phenomenological tradition that leads to a reversal of phenomenology. He then proposes to elaborate a phenomenology of the flesh which leads to the notion of an original flesh which is not constituted but is given in the arch-revelation of Life, as well as a phenomenology of Incarnation.

Although the flesh is traditionally understood as the seat of sin, in Christianity it is also the place of salvation, which consists in the deification of man, i.e. in the fact of becoming the Son of God, of returning to the eternal and absolute Life we had forgotten in losing ourselves in the world, in caring only about things and ourselves. In sin, we have the tragic experience of our powerlessness to do the good we would like to do and of our inability to avoid evil. Thus, faced with the magical body of the other, it is the anguished desire to rejoin the life in it that leads to error. In the night of lovers, the sexual act couples two impulsive movements, but erotic desire fails to attain the pleasure of the other just there where it is experienced, in a complete loving fusion. The erotic relation is however doubled by a pure affective relation, foreign to the carnal coupling, a relation made of mutual gratitude or love. It is this affective dimension that is denied in the form of violence that is pornography, which wrenches the erotic relation from the pathos of life in order to deliver it to the world, and which constitutes a genuine profanation of life.

==== Words of Christ (2002) ====
As Henry says in his last book Words of Christ, it is in the heart that life speaks, in its immediate pathetic self-revelation; but the heart is blind to the Truth, it is deaf to the word of Life, it is hard and selfish, and it is from this that evil comes. It is in the violence of its silent and implacable self-revelation, which bears witness against this degenerate life and against the evil that comes from it, that Judgement stands — Judgement which is identical to the advent of each Self to itself and from which none can escape.

== Descriptions of selected works ==
=== On economy and politics ===
- Du communisme au capitalisme, théorie d'une catastrophe (From Communism to Capitalism, Theory of a Catastrophe): The collapse of the eastern communist systems corresponds to the bankruptcy of a system that claimed to deny the reality of life in favour of falsely universal abstractions. But death is also at the meeting point in the empire of capitalism and of modern technology.

=== On culture and barbarism ===
- La barbarie (Barbarism): Culture, which is the self-development of life, is threatened in our society by the barbarism of the monstrous objectivity of technoscience, whose ideologies reject all form of subjectivity, while life is condemned to escape its anguish in the media universe.
- Voir l'invisible, sur Kandinsky (Seeing the Invisible, about Kandinsky): Art can save man, abandoned by our technological civilization, from his confusion. This is this spiritual quest that led Kandinsky to the creation of abstract painting. It is no longer a matter of representing the world but our inner life, by means of lines and colours that correspond to inner forces and sonorities.

=== On religion and Christianity ===
- C'est moi la Vérité, pour une philosophie du christianisme (I am the Truth: Toward a Philosophy of Christianity): This book explains the kind of truth that Christianity tries to transmit to Man. Christianity opposes to the truth of the world the Truth of Life, according to which man is the Son of God. The self-revelation of Life which experiences itself in its invisible interiority is the essence of God in which each individual is grounded. In the world, Jesus has the appearance of a man, but it is in the Truth of Life that he is the Christ, the First Living Being.
- Incarnation, une philosophie de la chair (Incarnation, a Philosophy of Flesh): The living flesh is radically opposed to the material body, because it is the flesh which, experiencing itself, enjoying itself in accordance with ever-renewed impressions, is able to feel the body which is exterior to it, to touch it and to be touched by it. It is the flesh which allows us to know the body. The fundamental teaching of the prologue to the Gospel according to St. John, who says that the Word became flesh, asserts the improbable thesis that God incarnated himself in a mortal flesh like ours — it asserts the unity of the Word and the flesh in Christ. What is it for flesh to be the place of God's revelation, and in what does this revelation consist?
- Paroles du Christ (Words of Christ): Can man understand in his own language the word of God, a word that speaks in another language? The words of Christ seem to many to be an immoderate claim because they claim not only to transmit the truth or a divine revelation, but to be this Revelation and this Truth, the Word of God himself, of this God that Christ himself claims to be.

=== Literary works ===
- Le jeune officier (The Young Officer): This first novel evokes the struggle of a young officer against evil, embodied by rats on a ship.
- L'amour les yeux fermés (Love With Closed Eyes): This novel, which won the Renaudot Prize, is the account of the destruction of a city which has reached the peak of its development and refinement and which is suffering from an insidious evil.
- Le fils du roi (The Son of the King): A story of life locked up in a psychiatric hospital and confronted by the rationality of psychiatrists.
- Le cadavre indiscret (The Indiscreet Corpse): In this novel, Henry tells us of the anxiety of the assassins of the secret and too honest treasurer of a political party, who finance an investigation to discover what is really known about them and to reassure themselves.

== Bibliography ==
=== Philosophical works ===
- L’Essence de la manifestation, PUF, collection "Epiméthée", 1963 (réédition 1990)
- Philosophie et Phénoménologie du corps, PUF, collection "Epiméthée", 1965 (réédition 1987)
- Marx:
  - Marx I. Une philosophie de la réalité, Gallimard, 1976 (réédition collection "Tel", 1991)
  - Marx II. Une philosophie de l’économie, Gallimard, 1976 (réédition collection "Tel", 1991)
- Généalogie de la psychanalyse. Le commencement perdu, PUF, collection "Epiméthée", 1985
- La Barbarie, Grasset, 1987 (rééditions: collection "Biblio Essais", 1988; PUF, collection "Quadridge", 2001)
- Voir l’invisible, sur Kandinsky, Bourin-Julliard, 1988 (rééditions: PUF, collection "Quadridge", 2005, 2010)
- Phénoménologie matérielle, PUF, collection "Epiméthée", 1990
- Du communisme au capitalisme. Théorie d'une catastrophe, Odile Jacob, 1990 (réédition Éditions l'Âge d'Homme, 2008)
- C'est moi la Vérité. Pour une philosophie du christianisme, Éditions du Seuil, 1996
- Vie et révélation, Publications de la Faculté des Lettres et des Sciences humaines de l'Université Saint-Joseph, Beyrouth, 1996.
- Incarnation. Une philosophie de la chair, Éditions du Seuil, 2000
- Paroles du Christ, Éditions du Seuil, 2002

=== Posthumous works ===
- Auto-donation. Entretiens et conférences, Éditions Prétentaine, 2002, réédition Beauchesne, 2004
- Le bonheur de Spinoza, PUF, collection "Epiméthée", 2003
- Phénoménologie de la vie:
  - Tome I. De la phénoménologie, PUF, collection "Epiméthée", 2003
  - Tome II. De la subjectivité, PUF, collection "Epiméthée", 2003
  - Tome III. De l’art et du politique, PUF, collection "Epiméthée", 2003
  - Tome IV. Sur l’éthique et la religion, PUF, collection "Epiméthée", 2004
  - Tome V, PUF, collection "Epiméthée", 2015
- Entretiens, Éditions Sulliver, 2005
- Le socialisme selon Marx, Éditions Sulliver, 2008
- Pour une phénoménologie de la vie - entretien avec Olivier Salazar-Ferrer, suivi de Perspectives sur la phénoménologie matérielle par Grégori Jean & Jean Leclercq, Éditions de Corlevour, 2010.

=== Literary works ===
- Le Jeune Officier, Gallimard, 1954
- L'Amour les yeux fermés, Prix Renaudot, Gallimard, 1976, et collection "Folio", 1982
- Le Fils du roi, Gallimard, 1981
- Le Cadavre indiscret, Albin Michel, 1996
