= Phenomenological life (Michel Henry) =

Phenomenological life (French: vie phénoménologique) is life considered from a philosophical and rigorously phenomenological point of view. The relevant philosophical project is called "radical phenomenology of life" (phénoménologie radicale de la vie) or "material phenomenology of life" (phénoménologie matérielle de la vie). This part of phenomenology has been developed by the French philosopher Michel Henry, since his fundamental book on The Essence of Manifestation; it studies the subjective life of individuals in their pathetic and affective reality as pure impression.

== Definition ==
The philosopher Michel Henry defines life from a phenomenological point of view as that which possesses the faculty and the power "of feeling and experiencing oneself in each point of its being".

For Michel Henry, life is essentially subjective force and affectivity — it consists of a pure subjective experience of oneself which perpetually oscillates between suffering and joy. A "subjective force" is not an impersonal, blind and insensitive force like the objective forces we meet in nature, but a living and sensible force experienced from within and resulting from an inner desire and a subjective effort of the will to satisfy it.

Starting from this phenomenological approach to life, in Incarnation, a Philosophy of Flesh Michel Henry establishes a radical opposition between the living flesh endowed with sensibility and the material body, which is in principle insensible.

The word "phenomenological" refers to phenomenology, which is the study of phenomena and a philosophical method which fundamentally concerns the study of phenomena as they appear. What Henry calls "absolute phenomenological life" is the subjective life of individuals reduced to its pure inner manifestation, as we perpetually live it and feel it. It is life as it reveals itself and appears inwardly, its self-revelation: life is both what reveals and what is revealed.

== Properties ==
Life is by nature invisible because it never appears in the exteriority of a look; it reveals itself in itself without gap or distance. The fact of seeing does in effect presuppose the existence of a distance and of a separation between what is seen and the one who sees, between the object that is perceived and the subject who perceives it. A feeling, for example, can never be seen from the exterior, it never appears in the "horizon of visibility" of the world; it feels itself and experiences itself from within in the radical immanence of life. Love cannot see itself, any more than hatred; feelings are felt in the secrecy of our hearts, where no look can penetrate.

Life is constituted of sensitivity and affectivity — it is the unity of their manifestation, affectivity being however the essence of sensibility (as Henry shows in The Essence of Manifestation) which means that every sensation is affective by nature. Phenomenological life is the foundation of all our subjective experiences (like the subjective experience of a sorrow, of seeing a color or the pleasure of drinking fresh water in summer) and of each of our subjective powers (the subjective power of moving the hand or the eyes, for example).

== Phenomenological vs. biological life ==
This phenomenological definition of life is founded, then, in the concrete subjective experience we have of life in our own existence. It thus corresponds to human life. In I am the Truth. Toward a Philosophy of Christianity, Michel Henry writes about the other forms of life studied by biology and from which Heidegger derives his own philosophical conception of life: "Is it not paradoxical for anyone who wants to know what life is to go and ask protozoa or, in the best case, honeybees? As if our only relation with life was a wholly external and fragile relation with beings about whom we know nothing – or so very little! As if we ourselves were not living beings!"

This definition, however, fails to include living organisms that cannot experience themselves, such as plant life — unless one can find evidence of the existence of a certain kind of sensibility in them, as Professor A. Tronchet appears to suggest in his book La sensibilité des plantes (Plant Sensibility): "The protoplasm of plant cells, like that of animal cells, is endowed with irritability, i.e. a particular form of sensibility, thanks to which it is capable of being affected by excitations originating externally or internally".

For Michel Henry, what scientists call “biological life” is only a visible appearance or the projection in the external world of the true life, whose inner or affective reality resides into the “absolute phenomenological life”, that’s to say in the pure and inner feeling that the living does constantly of his own life, in the suffering and the joy he constantly feels in himself.
