= Gustave Cohen =

French medievalist

Gustave Cohen (24 December 1879 – 10 June 1958) was a French medievalist.

Cohen was born and grew up in Brussels. He fought for the French army in World War I. He became professor of medieval literature at the Sorbonne, encouraging his students to put on dramatic productions of medieval material. After the Vichy government forced him to resign in 1940, Cohen emigrated to the United States. In February 1942 he helped found the New York École libre des hautes études with Henri Focillon and Jacques Maritain. He established the Entretiens de Pontigny, symposiums of French cultural activity held at Mount Holyoke College in 1942, 1943 and 1944.

== Publications ==
- Histoire de la mise en scène dans le théâtre religieux français du Moyen Âge, H. Champion, 1906.
- Rabelais et le théâtre, Champion, 1911.
- Mystères et moralités du manuscrit 617 de Chantilly, Champion, 1920.
- Écrivains français en Hollande dans la première moitié du XVIIe siècle, Champion, 1921.
- Ronsard, sa vie et son œuvre, Boivin, 1924.
- Le livre de conduite du régisseur et le compte des dépenses pour le Mystère de la Passion joué à Mons en 1501, Strasbourg, 1925.
- Le Théâtre en France au Moyen Âge, Rieder, 1928-1931.
- La Comédie latine en France au XIIe siècle, Les Belles Lettres, 1931.
- Un Grand Romancier d'amour et d'aventure du XIIe siècle : Chrétien de Troyes et son œuvre, Boivin, Paris, 1931.
- Le Champfleury de Geoffroy Tory, Charles Bosse, 1932.
- Essai d'explication du Cimetière marin, Gallimard, 1933.
- Le Miracle de Théophile, Delagrave, 1933.
- Le Jeu d'Adam et Ève, Delagrave, 1935.
- Le Jeu de Robin et Marion, Delagrave, 1935.
- Lettres aux Américains, Montréal, Éditions de l'arbre, 1942.
- Anthologie de la littérature française au Moyen Âge, Delagrave, 1946.
- La Grande Clarté du Moyen Âge, New York, Maison française d'édition, 1943.
- Ceux que j'ai connus, Montréal, Éditions de l'arbre, 1946.
- Le Théâtre français en Belgique au Moyen Âge, La Renaissance du Livre, Bruxelles, 1953.
