= Aristide Zolberg =

American political scientist

- Born: Aristide R. Zolberg; 1931
- Died: 2013 (aged 81–82)

Academic background
- Education: University of Chicago

Academic work
- Discipline: Political science

Aristide R. Zolberg (1931–2013) was an American political scientist, educated at the University of Chicago (Ph.D. in Political Science, 1961). He taught in a number of universities, including the University of Wisconsin, the University of Chicago and, finally, the New School for Social Research from 1983 onwards. At the New School, Zolberg served as Walter A. Eberstadt Professor of Politics and University in Exile Professor Emeritus.

In 2008, Zolberg was awarded the ENMISA Distinguished Scholar Award by the International Studies Association. He is the author of A Nation by Design: Immigration Policy in the Fashioning of America.

Zolberg died on April 12, 2013, at the age of 81. The New School's Zolberg Institute on Migration and Mobility is named in his honor.
