= Joseph Cohen (philosopher) =

French philosopher and academic

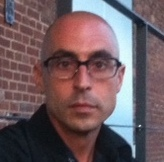
- Born: August 12, 1971 (age 55); Montreal, Canada

Education
- Education: York University (BA, 1993); University of Oxford (BPhil, 1994); Paris 1 Panthéon-Sorbonne University (M.A., 1996); EHESS/Caen (M.A., 1997; PhD, 2002)
- Doctoral advisor: Jacques Derrida, Robert Legros
- Other advisors: Bernard Bourgeois, Jürgen Habermas, Hans-Georg Gadamer

Philosophical work
- Era: Contemporary Philosophy
- Region: Western philosophy
- School: Continental philosophy
- Institutions: University College Dublin
- Main interests: German idealism, Jewish philosophy, hermeneutics, history of philosophy, philosophy of history, epistemology

Joseph Cohen (French: [kɔ.ɛn]; born 12 August 1971) is a French philosopher and associate professor of Contemporary Continental Philosophy at University College Dublin. He works principally on German idealism and phenomenology, as well as on contemporary philosophical thought in a European context. He holds three doctorates: in philosophy, history of philosophy, and epistemology.

Since 2007, he is a founding member and secretary of the Irish Phenomenological Circle.

In 2015, he became a founding member of Les Rencontres Philosophiques de Monaco, where his status is currently categorized as honorary.

== Education ==
In 1994, he obtained a Bachelor of Arts degree in philosophy from York University in Toronto, and the following year, a master's degree in philosophy under the supervision of Bernard Bourgeois at Sorbonne Paris North University (Paris XIII). (Note: Cohen's French Wikipedia page claims that his Master's Degree is from Paris I. Another source, his University College Dublin page, says Paris XIII. While it would seem that the latter is the best source, Bernard Bourgeois was a professor at Paris I from 1989. For now, it will be assumed that the University College Dublin profile is the accurate version.)

In 1996, he earned a postgraduate diploma in the history of philosophy under the supervision of Bernard Bourgeois, and in 1997, he received a second postgraduate diploma in philosophy and epistemology at the École des hautes études en sciences sociales (EHESS) under the joint supervision of Jacques Derrida.

In 2001, under the supervision of Hans-Georg Gadamer and Reiner Wiehl, he joined the Philosophy Seminar at the University of Heidelberg before defending his doctoral thesis in philosophy in 2002, supervised by Robert Legros (University of Caen).

In 2003, he became a postdoctoral researcher (fellow) in the Department of Philosophy at the University of Strasbourg II in Alsace.

== Academic career ==
From 2004 to 2010, Cohen served as a program director (Directeur de programme) at the Collège international de philosophie in Paris. While at the University of Strasbourg, he founded a research unit for Phenomenology, Hermeneutics, and Deconstruction, from 2003 to 2005 . In June 2004, he coordinated at Strasbourg what would become Jacques Derrida's last lecture in France. He organized a doctoral study day that concluded with what would be the last public dialogue between Jean-Luc Nancy, Philippe Labarthe, and Derrida.

In Strasbourg, he also worked within the framework of the Parliament of Philosophers (Strasbourg) where he and Gérard Bensussan organized the colloquium "Heidegger: The Danger and the Promise."

He was a member of the editorial board of the journal Rue Descartes (revue) from 2004 to 2008, of the journal Les Temps modernes (Éditions Gallimard) from 2009 to 2014, and of the journal Cités (revue) from 2010 to 2015. He was also a tenured member of the PHILéPOL research team at Paris Descartes University from 2010 to 2015.

In 2015, he joined with Charlotte Casiraghi, Robert Maggiori, and Raphael Zagury-Orly to become a founding member of Les Rencontres Philosophiques de Monaco. Currently, his position at PhiloMonaco is honorary, as he is listed as Membre fondateur honoraire.

From September 2015 to August 2016, he was a research fellow in philosophy at the Heidelberg Centre for Transcultural Studies (Karl Jaspers Centre) at the University of Heidelberg.

In 2016, he and Zagury-Orly relaunched and revived the Foundation for French Judaism, the Colloquium of French-Speaking Jewish Intellectuals, and then, in 2017, the René Cassin Seminar.

In 2018, Alain Fleischer, Zagury-Orly, and Cohen founded Le Fresnoy National Studio, the interdisciplinary research group "The Coming Human."

In 2020, he founded the "Jewish Thought and Contemporary Philosophy" project at the Newman Centre for the Study of Religions, University College Dublin. This project is the first research and higher education seminar on Jewish thought in Ireland.

Cohen is a tenured professor of philosophy at the University College, Dublin.

He has held numerous visiting professorships across Europe, including the University of Heidelberg, Karlsruhe University of Arts and Design, Stuttgart University, Sorbonne University, (Note: Paris IV and Paris I according to Cohen's University College Dublin page) Sapienza University of Rome, University of Macerata, the University of Poitiers, and University of Sassari.

== Philosophical work ==
Cohen's research primarily intersects German Idealism (specifically G.W.F. Hegel), 20th-century French philosophy and Post-structuralism, phenomenology, and Jewish philosophy.

His work often analyzes the themes of sacrifice, alterity, and the spectrality of historical events.

He has co-authored several works and articles exploring the philosophy of history and the concept of justice with philosopher Raphaël Zagury-Orly. For example, in 2006, Cohen and Zagury-Orly collaborated with Jean-Luc Nancy, Jean-François Mattéi, Peter Eli Gordon, Marc Crépon, François Raffoul, Françoise Dastur, Holger Zaborowski, Peter Sloterdijk, Gianni Vattimo, Rodolphe Gasché, Mario Ruggenini, Catherine Malabou, Frédéric Neyrat, Michel Vanni, Dominique Pradelle, Gérard Bensussan,Andrea Potestà, Stéphane Habib, and Samuel Weber on the book Heidegger. Le danger et la promesse.

Cohen and Zagury-Orly have extensively explored the intersection of phenomenology, Western metaphysics, and Jewish thought. Their 2021 book, L'Adversaire privilégié : Heidegger, les juifs et nous, offers a comprehensive reading of the totality of Martin Heidegger's oeuvre rather than focusing solely on his later Black Notebooks. They argue that a structural isolation or exclusion of the Jewish figure from the "history of being" can be traced back to the very beginning of Heidegger's career in the early 1920s. Representing a generation of scholars trained within the tradition of French Existential phenomenology, also known as Heideggerianism, Zagury-Orly and Cohen advocate for continuing the rigorous study of controversial canonical figures, arguing that confronting the structural exclusions in their texts is vital toward understanding how Western philosophy constructs the concept of "the other."

== Selected bibliography ==
=== Articles ===
- (2008). With Raphaël Zagury-Orly. Messianismo e política: Nota sobre o sionismo religioso. Reflexão, 33(94).
- (2012). Levinas and the Problem of Phenomenology. International Journal of Philosophical Studies, 20(3), 363–374.
- (2012). ‘Introduction: Emmanuel Levinas’-From Philosophy to the Other. International Journal of Philosophical Studies, 20(3), 315–317.
- (2012). With Zagury-Orly. Avant-propos. Les Temps Modernes, n° 669-670(3), 3–4.
- (2013). The Call of Philosophy. Journal of the British Society for Phenomenology, 44(1), 45–58.
- (2014). On the Possibility of Sacrifice. International Journal of Philosophical Studies, 22(4), 552–568.
- (2017). From the Night, the Spectre. In Unconsciousness Between Phenomenology and Psychoanalysis (pp. 133–140). Cham: Springer International Publishing.
- (2020). With Zagury-Orly. History supposes Justice. Das Questões, 9(1), 43–67.
- (2023). Futurités de l’être : entre le “mourir” et le “vivre” de l’Autre. Metodo, 10(2), 95–118.
- (2023). With Zagury-Orly. On history. Metodo, 10(2), 7–12.
- (2026). Levinas, Emmanuel (1905/06–1995). In Encyclopedia of Phenomenology (pp. 1–17). Cham: Springer Nature Switzerland.
- (2026). Writing, Sedimentations, Difference. On the Aporology of History. Continental Philosophy Review, 1–18.

=== Books ===
- With Raphaël Zagury-Orly, Judéités: Questions pour Jacques Derrida, Paris: Éditions Galilée, 2003. ISBN 9782718605821.
  - English translation: Judeities: Questions for Jacques Derrida, edited by Bettina Bergo, Cohen, and Zagury-Orly; translated by Bergo and Michael B. Smith, New York: Fordham University Press, 2007.
    - Chapter titled, "A Monster of Faithfulness," written by Cohen and Zagury-Orly
- Le spectre juif de Hegel. Paris: Galilée, 2005. Preface by Jean-Luc Nancy. ISBN 9782718606965.
- Le sacrifice de Hegel. Galilée, 2007. ISBN 9782718607542.
- The Husserl Dictionary. With Dermot Moran. Continuum International Publishing Group, 2012.
- Alternances de la métaphysique. Essais sur Emmanuel Levinas. Galilée, 2014. ISBN 9782718607788.
- With Zagury-Orly. L'Adversaire privilégié. Heidegger, les juifs et nous. Galilée, 2021.
- La règle du jeu n°68. With Yossi Klein Halévi, Bruno Karsenti, Cyril Aslanov, Dany Traum, Daniel Epstein, and Zagury-Orly. Éditions Grasset, 2022. ISBN 9782246817673.
- With Zagury-Orly. To Live and Die in History, in After Life, ed. Rona Cohen & Ruth Ronen. Routledge, 2023. ISBN 9781003371557.
  - Published as a standalone book by Alibri Verlag, 2024. ISBN 9783865693969.
- With Zagury-Orly, "Anti-Judaism and Anti-Semitism in European Philosophy", in The Routledge Handbook of Philosophy and Europe, Routledge, 2021, p. 218. ISBN 9781317414520.
