= Continental Philosophy Review =

- Discipline: Philosophy
- Language: English
- Edited by: Anthony Steinbock

Publication details
- Former names: Man and World
- History: 1968–present
- Publisher: Springer Science+Business Media
- Frequency: Quarterly

Standard abbreviations
- ISO 4: Cont. Philos. Rev.

Indexing
- ISSN: 1387-2842 (print); 1573-1103 (web)
- LCCN: 98660897
- OCLC no.: 905783063
- Man and World
- ISSN: 0025-1534

Links
- Journal homepage; Online archive

Continental Philosophy Review is a quarterly peer-reviewed academic journal covering different areas of continental philosophy. It is published by Springer Science+Business Media and the editor-in-chief is Anthony Steinbock (Stony Brook University). The journal was established in 1968 as Man and World, obtaining its current title in 1998.

== Abstracting and indexing ==
The journal is abstracted and indexed in:

- Academic OneFile
- Arts & Humanities Citation Index
- Current Contents/Arts and Humanities
- EBSCO databases
- FRANCIS
- PASCAL
- ProQuest databases
- Répertoire Bibliographique de la Philosophie
- Scopus
- The Philosopher's Index

== Board ==
- Editor in Chief: Anthony J. Steinbock, Stony Brook University, USA
- Associate Editor: Robert C. Scharff, University of New Hampshire, USA

=== Founding Editors ===
- John Mueller Anderson, Pennsylvania State University, USA
- Joseph J. Kockelmans, Pennsylvania State University, USA
- Calvin O. Schrag, Purdue University, USA

=== Book Review Editors ===
- Joseph Lemelin, Stony Brook University, USA
- Claude Romano, University of Paris-Sorbonne, France

=== Advisory Editorial Board ===
- Andreea Smaranda Aldea, DePaul University, USA
- Amy Allen, Penn State University, USA
- Ellie Anderson, Pomona College, USA
- Jeffery Bloechl, Boston College, USA
- Robert Crease, Stony Brook University, USA
- Steven Crowell, Rice University, USA
- Daniel Dahlstrom, Boston University, USA
- John J. Drummond, Fordham University, USA
- Lewis Gordon, University of Connecticut, USA
- Christina M. Gschwandtner, Fordham University, USA
- Sara Heinämaa, University of Jyväskylä, Finland
- Adrian Johnston, University of New Mexico, USA
- Sophie Loidolt, Technical University of Darmstadt, Germany
- David Morris, Concordia University, Canada
- Johanna Oksala, Helsinki University, Finland
- Ignacio Quepons, University of Veracruz, Xalapa, Mexico
- Antonio Zirion Quijano, National Autonomous University of Mexico, Mexico
- James C. Risser, Seattle University, USA
- Claudia Serban, University of Toulouse Jean Jaurès, France
- Cynthia Willett, Emory University, USA

=== Editorial Board ===
- Linda Alcoff, City University of New York, USA
- John Caputo, Syracuse University, USA
- Edward S. Casey, Stony Brook University, USA
- Raphael Celis, University of Lausanne, Switzerland
- Françoise Dastur, University of Nice Sophia-Antipolis, France
- Bernard Dauenhauer, University of Georgia, USA
- Natalie Depraz, University of Rouen, France
- Anibal Fornari, Catholic University of Santa Fe, Argentina
- Dieter Henrich, LMU Munich, Germany
- Nam-In Lee, Seoul National University, Korea
- William Leon McBride, Purdue University, USA
- Junichi Murata, University of Tokyo, Japan
- Liangkang Ni, Sun Yat-Sen University, China
- Graeme Nicholson, University of Toronto, Canada
- Adriaan Peperzak, Loyola University, USA
- Ben-Ami Scharfstein, Tel-Aviv University, Israel
- Toru Tani, Ritsumeikan University, Japan
- Bernhard Waldenfels, Ruhr University, Germany
- Dan Zahavi, University of Copenhagen, Denmark

== See also ==
- List of philosophy journals
