= Éditions Galilée =

French publishing company

- Founded: November 29, 1971
- Headquarters location: Paris, France
- Key people: Michel Delorme
- Revenue: €677,300 (in 2017)
- Official website: www.editions-galilee.fr

Éditions Galilée is a French publishing house in Paris, and was founded in 1971 by Michel Delorme. It specializes in philosophy, French literature, arts and human sciences. Focusing on the deconstructionist thought of Jacques Derrida, Galilée also publishes works on postmodernist thought (Jean Baudrillard, Jean-François Lyotard, etc.).

In 2008, their catalogue consisted of around 900 titles and was run by Michel Delorme (CEO, editorial director).

In 2020, the publishing house was awarded the Mention Honorifique by Les Rencontres Philosophiques de Monaco.

== History ==
Éditions Galilée was founded in 1971. In 1973, Éditions Galilée published the 1973 Critique du capitalisme quotidien by Michel Bosquet; Les Figures juives de Marx by Élisabeth de Fontenay; Le Discours impur by Jean-Noël Vuarnet; Camera obscura : de l'idéologie by Sarah Kofman; Le Titre de la lettre by Philippe Lacoue-Labarthe; and Jean-Luc Nancy; L'Archéologie du frivole by Jacques Derrida in the preface to L'Essai sur l'origine des connaissances humaines by Condillac; and La Remarque spéculative by Jean-Luc Nancy.

Less than a year later, Derrida, Nancy, Lacoue-Labarthe and Kofman created the collection "La philosophie en effet" which Derrida inaugurated with the publication of Glas. It was in the same collection that Sarah Kofman published Quatre romans analytiques shortly after. In 1974, Georges Perec published Espèces d'espaces, and Alphabets in 1976. In 1974 and 1975, éditions Galilée published the first five issues of the review Digraphe, edited by Jean Ristat, as well as multiple issues of the review Chorus edited by Pierre Tilman.

The mixture of artists, works, and work with books and their creators, which was the founding ethos of Galilée, led to further publications from Marcel Duchamp and the fictional Jean Clair, L'Invention du corps chrétien by Jean-Louis Schefer, and Wifredo Lam publishing Dessins (1975). Further, Détruire la peinture by Louis Marin, Les Transformateurs Duchamp by Jean-François Lyotard (1977). Oublier Foucault by Jean Baudrillard, Fondements pour une morale by André Gorz, L'Éboulement by Jacques Dupin, Vitesse et politique by Paul Virilio were also published in 1977. In 1979, Christian Boltanski created for Farce by Jean-Marie Touratier, an original cover and created a separate original cover with an opening window showing a sugar cage created by Boltanski in 1971. Pierre Restany published L'Autre Face de l'art the same year. In 1980, Jean Baudrillard published De la séduction, Paul Virilio : Vitesse et politique, Jean Oury : Onze heures du soir à la Borde, Jean-Clarence Lambert : Le Noir de l'azur, followed in 1984, Jean-Joseph Goux, Les monnayeurs du langage, Christine Buci-Glucksmann : La Raison baroque and in 1986, Michel Ragon : 25 ans d'art vivant ; finally, to close the decade, Michel Sicard published his Essais sur Sartre and Félix Guattari released his Cartographies schizoanalytiques in 1989.

In the following years, Bernard Stiegler released his first title for Galilée with La Technique et le Temps I in 1994, Philippe Bonnefis (first title at Galilée : Parfums, in 1995), Ignacio Ramonet (Géopolitique du chaos, 1997), Hélène Cixous (Voiles, with Jacques Derrida, 1998), Michel Deguy (La Raison poétique, 2000), Serge Margel (Logique de la nature, 2000), Michel Onfray (Célébration du génie colérique, 2002), Marc Crépon (Terreur et poésie, 2004), Pascal Quignard (Écrits de l'éphémère, 2005, along with five other books the same year), Joseph Cohen (Le spectre juif de Hegel, 2005), Stéphane Sangral (Méandres et Néant, 2013), and many others. Other artists continued to publish with the company: Valerio Adami, Pierre Alechinsky, Karel Appel, Christian Boltanski, Pol Bury, Corneille Guillaume Beverloo, Leonardo Cremonini, Henri Cueco, Dado, Jacques Doucet, Erro, Gérard Garouste, Peter Klasen, Jean Le Gac, Simon Hantaï, Paul Jenkins, François Martin, Raymond Mason, Jacques Monory, Danièle Noël, Ernest Pignon-Ernest, François Rouan, Antonio Segui, Takis, Antoni Tàpies, Vladimir Veličković.

== Main collections ==
- « Débats »
- « L'espace critique »
- « Incises »
- « Écritures / Figures »
- « La philosophie en effet »
- « Lignes fictives »

== Main authors ==
- Marc Augé
- Jean Baudrillard
- Yves Bonnefoy
- Christine Buci-Glucksmann
- Hélène Cixous
- Joseph Cohen
- Michel Deguy
- Jacques Derrida
- Serge Doubrovsky
- Félix Guattari
- André Gorz
- Jean-Joseph Goux
- Sarah Kofman
- Philippe Lacoue-Labarthe
- Jean Le Gac
- Jean-François Lyotard
- Serge Margel
- Jean-Luc Nancy
- Michel Onfray
- Pascal Quignard
- François Raffoul
- Ignacio Ramonet
- Jacques Rancière
- Stéphane Sangral
- Jean-Louis Schefer
- Bernard Stiegler
- Paul Virilio
