= Death: An Essay on Finitude =

- Author: Françoise Dastur
- Original title: La Mort: Essai sur la Finitude
- Translator: John Llewelyn
- Language: French
- Subject: philosophy of death
- Publisher: Hatier, The Athlone Press
- Publication date: 1994
- Publication place: France
- English publication date: 1996
- Media type: Print
- Pages: 208 (French); 116 (English)
- ISBN: 9780485114874

Death: An Essay on Finitude is a book by Françoise Dastur in which the author explores philosophical aspects of death in the continental perspective.

== Reception ==
The book was reviewed by Mark Sinclair and Stan Van Hooft.
