= Alexandru Dragomir =

Romanian philosopher

Alexandru Dragomir (November 8, 1916 in Zalău – November 13, 2002 in Bucharest) was a Romanian philosopher. He made his doctoral studies under Martin Heidegger's direction, in 1940.

== Philosophy ==
Dragomir refused to publish any of his writing. He always maintained that publishing was of no importance to him; instead, genuine understanding was all that mattered. Thus he never got involved with the public cultural milieu. Before his death, no one even knew whether he had actually written anything, or not.

Walter Biemel recollects that Heidegger much appreciated Dragomir's brightness. Dragomir attended Heidegger's private seminars and it is said that, when the discussion seemed to stall, Heidegger would turn to him and say: “Eh, what do the Latins say? ”. Dragomir was a close friend of Biemel, with whom he translated “What is metaphysics? ” into Romanian (in 1942), and of the Romanian philosopher Constantin Noica.

At the end of 1943, Dragomir was obliged to leave Freiburg im Breisgau and Heidegger's seminars and return to Romania to be conscripted. Even Heidegger's insistence to prolong his stay in Freiburg could not prevent his departure. In 1945, the end of the war coincided with the Russian occupation and the introduction of communism in Romania; Dragomir saw himself unable to continue his thesis with Heidegger. He understood that his connections with Germany could be reasons for political persecution and that his interest in philosophy could trigger his prosecution. Dragomir understood that his life depended on his ability to hide his interest in philosophy and to efface his ties with Germany. While continuously erasing the traces of his past, Dragomir worked in all possible trades: welder, salesman, civil servant or accountant, always changing jobs, being regularly fired because of his politically unsuitable “file”. Finally, he was an economist with the Ministry for Wood until his retirement in 1976. After 1985, he agreed to make a compromise as far as his silence on his philosophical activity: he decided to hold several seminars with the disciples of Noica: Gabriel Liiceanu, Andrei Pleșu, Sorin Vieru.

== Legacy ==
In 2002, a hundred books with notes, comments on traditional philosophical texts, tests of investigation and phenomenologic analysis, philosophical and extremely subtle descriptions were found at his home. "Most of the texts are phenomenologic microanalyses of various concrete aspects of life. Texts were found that dealt with themes such as the mirror, lapse of memory, error [...], the morning alarm clock, what one calls ugly and disgusting, attention - because of being wrong about oneself, writing and orality - because of distinguishing and [...], uniqueness and so on." They are disparate and heterogeneous subjects, as if Dragomir had let his phenomenologic magnifier fall upon the diversity of the world and chose to analyze, for his own desire to comprehend, with no other end, such and such fact or such and such aspect of reality.

However, one of his topics is constant: it is to be found in a series of books, entitled Chronos, in which Dragomir systematically looked into the problem of time for several decades: the first book goes back to 1948 and it includes several notes written in German, while the last one covers the period between 1980 and 1990. This discovery enabled the recovery of Dragomir's work. Five volumes have been already published by the Humanitas publishing house to-date: Crase banalităţi metafizice (2004; translated into English by James Christian Brown as The World We Live In, 2017; into French by Dobré Michelle, as Banalités métaphysiques, 2008), Cinci plecări din prezent. Exerciţii fenomenologice ("Five departures from present. Phenomenological exercises", 2005.), Caietele timpului ("The Time Notebooks", 2006, translated into French by Romain Otal as Cahiers du temps, 2010; into German by Eveline Cioflec, as Chronos. Notizbücher über Zeit, 2017), Semințe (2008), and Meditații despre epoca modernă (2010). Lastly, to prevent any further delay in the reception of this thinker abroad, a number of the journal Studia Phaenomenologica was dedicated to him, featuring texts by Dragomir translated into French, English and German, as well as texts about his personality, according to the ones who knew him and who could testify for his life and his manner of philosophizing. Other translations appeared in the French journal Alter.

Starting from 2009, A Romanian research institute bears his name: The Institute for Philosophy “Alexandru Dragomir”.

== Sources ==
- Paul Balogh & Cristian Ciocan (eds.), The Ocean of Forgetting. Alexandru Dragomir: A Romanian Phenomenologist Studia Phaenomenologica IV (2004) 3-4
- Alexandru Dragomir, The World We Live In, Translation by James Christian Brown, Cham: Springer, 2017 https://doi.org/10.1007/978-3-319-42854-3
- Alexandru Dragomir, Banalités métaphysiques, Translation by Dobré Michelle, Paris: Vrin, 2008
- Alexandru Dragomir, Cahiers du temps, Translation by Romain Otal, Paris: Vrin, 2010
- Alexandru Dragomir, Chronos. Notizbücher über Zeit, Translation by Eveline Cioflec, Würzburg: Könighausen und Neumann, 2017
- Mădălina Diaconu, "Alexandru Dragomir: Chronos. Notizbücher über Zeit | Rezension," Spiegelung 2, 2020
- Gabriel Liiceanu, The Notebooks from Underground," in Alexandru Dragomir, The World We Live In, Cham: Springer, 2017
