= Symposium: Canadian Journal of Continental Philosophy =

- Discipline: Philosophy
- Language: English, French
- Edited by: Lorraine Markotic

Publication details
- History: 1997–present
- Publisher: Canadian Society for Continental Philosophy
- Frequency: Biannually

Standard abbreviations
- ISO 4: Symp.: Can. J. Cont. Philos.

Indexing
- ISSN: 1917-9685 (print); 2154-5278 (web)

Links
- Journal homepage

Symposium: Canadian Journal of Continental Philosophy is a semi-annual peer-reviewed academic journal covering different areas of continental philosophy published by Canadian Society for Continental Philosophy. It was established in 1997 and publishes contributions in English and French.

== Abstracting and indexing ==
The journal is abstracted and indexed in:

- CNKI Scholar
- Dimensions
- EBSCO Discover
- Emerging Sources Citation Index
- Google Scholar
- Humanities International Index
- Humanities Source
- Index Copernicus
- International Bibliography of the Social Sciences
- JournalTOCs
- MIAR: Matriz de Información para el Análisis de Revistas
- Microsoft Academic
- Philosopher's Index
- PhilPapers
- ProQuest Summon
- Scilit
- WorldCat Local

== Editorial team ==
- Editor-in-chief: Lorraine Markotic, University of Calgary
- Associate Editors: Ada Jaarsma, Mount Royal University; Jim Vernon, York University
- Assistants to the Editor: Will Best, Kwantlen Polytechnic University; Samantha Carron, University of Calgary
- Book Review Editors: Rick Elmore, Senior Managing Editor, Appalachian State University; Jean-François Perrier, Université Laval

=== Advisory Board ===
- Manola Antonioli, École Nationale Supérieure d'Architecture de La Villette
- Sophie-Jan Arrien, Université Laval
- Bruce Baugh, Thompson Rivers University
- Alain Beaulieu, Laurentian University
- Constantin Boundas, Trent University
- Antonio Calcagno, King's University College at The University of Western Ontario
- Cristian Ciocan, Romanian Society for Phenomenology
- Philippe Constantineau, Royal Military College
- Diane Enns, McMaster University
- Paul Fairfield, Queen’s University
- Jane Forsey, University of Winnipeg
- Jean Grondin, Université de Montréal
- Donald Ipperciel, Glendon College, York University
- Morny Joy, University of Calgary
- Richard Kearney, Boston College
- Jay Lampert, Duquesne University
- Linda Martı́n-Alcoff, CUNY Graduate Center
- James Mensch, Charles University, Prague
- Jeff Mitscherling, University of Guelph
- Marie-Eve Morin, University of Alberta
- Tom Rockmore, Peking University, China

== Symposium Book Award ==
Symposium grants an annual book award. Books submitted for this award are assessed by Symposium editorial team and the CSCP executive. Recipients have included:

- 2024 Henry Dicks, The Biomimicry Revolution: Learning From Nature How to Inhabit the Earth, Columbia University Press, 2023.
- 2023 April Flakne, The Affection in Between: From Common Sense to Sensing in Common, Ohio UP, 2022.
- 2023 Pierre-Alexandre Fradet, Le désir du réel dans la philosophie québécoise, Éditions Nota Bene, 2022.
- 2023 Ian Alexander Moore, Dialogue on the Threshold: Heidegger and Trakl, SUNY Press, 2022.
- 2022 Ian Angus, Groundwork of Phenomenological Marxism: Crisis, Body, World, Rowman & Littlefield, 2021.
- 2022 Bettina Bergo, Anxiety: A Philosophical History, Oxford UP, 2021.
- 2022 Lorenzo C. Simpson, Hermeneutics as Critique: Science, Politics, Race, and Culture, Columbia UP, 2021.
- 2021 Grégori Jean, L’humanité à son insu. Phénoménologie, anthropologie, métaphysique, Association Internationale de Phénoménologie, 2020.
- 2020 Stella Gaon, The Lucid Vigil: Deconstruction, Desire and the Politics of Critique, Routledge, 2019.
- 2019 Rosalyn Diprose and Ewa Ziarek, Arendt, Natality and Biopolitics: Toward Democratic Plurality and Reproductive Justice, Edinburgh UP, 2018.
- 2018 Penelope Deutscher, Foucault’s Futures: A Critique of Reproductive Reason, Columbia UP, 2017.
- 2017 Greg Bird, Containing Community: From Political Economy to Ontology in Agamben, Esposito, and Nancy, SUNY Press, 2016.
- 2016 Thomas Nail, The Figure of the Migrant, Stanford UP, 2015.
- 2015 Anthony J. Steinbock, Moral Emotions: Reclaiming the Evidence of the Heart, Northwestern UP, 2014.
- 2014 Steven G. Crowell, Normativity and Phenomenology in Husserl and Heidegger, Cambridge UP, 2013.
- 2013 Sean D. Kirkland, The Ontology of Socratic Questioning in Plato’s Early Dialogues, SUNY Press, 2012.
- 2012 Espen Hammer, Philosophy and Temporality from Kant to Critical Theory, Cambridge UP, 2011.
- 2011 Andrew J. Mitchell, Heidegger among the Sculptors: Body, Space, and the Art of Dwelling, Stanford UP, 2010.
- 2010 James R. Mensch, Embodiments: From the Body to the Body Politic, Northwestern UP, 2009.
- 2009 Dana Hollander, Exemplarity and Chosenness: Rosenzweig and Derrida on the Nation of Philosophy, Stanford UP, 2008.
- 2008 Lambert Zuidervaart, Social Philosophy after Adorno, Cambridge UP, 2007.
- 2007 Lisa Guenther, The Gift of the Other: Levinas and the Politics of Reproduction, SUNY Press, 2006.
- 2006 Lambert Zuidervaart, Artistic Truth: Aesthetics, Discourse, and Imaginative Disclosure, Cambridge UP, 2004.

== See also ==
- List of philosophy journals
