= John Llewellyn =

John Llewellyn may refer to:

- John Llewellyn (fencer) (born 1957), British fencer who appeared at three Olympic Games
- John Llewellyn (racing driver), British former auto racing driver
- Sir John Llewellyn (academic), academic administrator in New Zealand and Great Britain
- John Anthony Llewellyn (1933–2013), British-born American scientist and NASA astronaut
- Sir John Dillwyn-Llewellyn, 1st Baronet (1836–1927), Welsh Conservative Member of Parliament
- John Seys-Llewellyn (1912–2003), Welsh barrister and judge
- John Llewellin, 1st Baron Llewellin (1893–1957), British army officer and politician

== See also ==
- John Llewelyn (born 1928), Welsh-born British philosopher
- John Dillwyn Llewelyn (1810–1882), Welsh botanist and pioneer photographer
