= Dastur (surname) =

Dastur is a Parsi surname. Notable people with the surname include:

- Amyra Dastur (born 1993), Indian film actress
- Firoz Dastur (1919–2008), Indian film actor and classical vocalist
- Parzaan Dastur (born 1991), Indian actor and writer
- Françoise Dastur (born 1942), French philosopher
