= Studia Phaenomenologica =

- Discipline: Philosophy, Phenomenology
- Language: English
- Edited by: Cristian Ciocan

Publication details
- History: 2001–present
- Publisher: Zeta Books in collaboration with the Romanian Society for Phenomenology (Romania)
- Frequency: Annual

Standard abbreviations
- ISO 4: Stud. Phaenomenologica

Indexing
- ISSN: 1582-5647 (print); 2069-0061 (web)
- OCLC no.: 474339400

Links
- Journal homepage; Online access

Studia Phaenomenologica is a peer-reviewed academic journal dedicated to the study of phenomenology and hermeneutics. It was established in 2001 by the Romanian Society for Phenomenology, and the founding editors-in-chief were Gabriel Cercel and Cristian Ciocan. The journal is currently published by Zeta Books. All issues are available online from the Philosophy Documentation Center.

== Published issues ==
- Volume 25 (2025) – Eco-Phenomenology
- Volume 24 (2024) – Phenomenology and the Sciences
- Volume 23 (2023) – Phenomenologies of the Image
- Volume 22 (2022) – Gestures
- Volume 21 (2021) – From Witnessing to Testimony
- Volume 20 (2020) – Phenomenology and the History of Platonism
- Volume 19 (2019) – On Conflict and Violence
- Volume 18 (2018) – The Promise of Genetic Phenomenology
- Volume 17 (2017) – Phenomenology of Animality
- Volume 16 (2016) – Film and Phenomenology
- Volume 15 (2015) – Early Phenomenology
- Volume 14 (2014) – Place, Environment, Atmosphere
- Volume 13 (2013) – On the Proper Use of Phenomenology. Paul Ricoeur Centenary
- Volume 12 (2012) – Possibilities of Embodiment
- Volume 11 (2011) – Concepts of Tradition in Phenomenology
- Volume 10 (2010) – Phenomenology and Psychology
- Volume 9 (2009) – Michel Henry's Radical Phenomenology
- Volume 8 (2008) – Phenomenology and Literature
- Volume 7 (2007) – Jan Patočka and the European Heritage
- Volume 6 (2006) – A Century with Levinas. Notes on the Margins of his Legacy
- Volume 5 (2012) – Translating Heidegger's Sein und Zeit
- Volume 4 issue 3–4 (2004) – The Ocean of Forgetting. Alexandru Dragomir: A Romanian Phenomenologist
- Volume 4 issue 1–2 (2004) – Issues on Brentano, Husserl and Heidegger
- Volume 3 Special Issue – Kunst und Wahrheit. Festschrift für Walter Biemel zu seinem 85. Geburtstag
- Volume 3 issue 3–4 (2003) – Maurice Merleau-Ponty: Chiasm and Logos
- Volume 3 issue 1–2 (2003) – The School of Brentano and Husserlian Phenomenology
- Volume 2 issue 3–4 (2002) – Issues on Husserl, Fink and Schutz
- Volume 2 issue 1–2 (2002) – In Memoriam: Hans-Georg Gadamer
- Volume 1 issue 3–4 (2001) – The Early Heidegger
- Volume 1 issue 1–2 (2001) – Heidegger and Theology

== Abstracting and indexing ==
Studia Phaenomenologica is abstracted and indexed in Academic Search, Arts & Humanities Citation Index, Central and Eastern European Online Library, Current Contents/Arts & Humanities, FRANCIS, Philosopher's Index, Répertoire bibliographique de la philosophie, and Scopus.

== See also ==
- List of philosophy journals
