= Sean D. Kirkland =

American philosopher

- Awards: Symposium Book Award

Education
- Education: Stony Brook University, Bergische Universität Wuppertal, Gustavus Adolphus College

Philosophical work
- Era: 21st-century philosophy
- Region: Western philosophy
- School: Continental
- Institutions: DePaul University
- Main interests: Ancient Greek Philosophy, Phenomenology

Sean D. Kirkland is an American philosopher and professor of philosophy at DePaul University. He is known for his expertise on Ancient Greek Philosophy. Kirkland won the 2013 Symposium Book Award for his monograph The Ontology of Socratic Questioning in Platos Early Dialogues.

== Books ==
- The Ontology of Socratic Questioning in Platos Early Dialogues, SUNY Press, 2012
- The Returns of Antigone: Interdisciplinary Essays, co-edited with Tina Chanter, SUNY Press, 2014
- A Companion to Ancient Philosophy, co-edited with Eric Sanday, Northwestern University Press 2018
- Heidegger and the Destruction of Aristotle: On How to Read the Tradition, Northwestern University Press, 2023
- Aristotle and Tragic Temporality (Edinburgh University Press, 2025)
