= Canadian Society for Continental Philosophy =

- Founders: Gary Madison, Anthony Kerby, John van Buren, John King, Michael Yeo and Jeff Mitscherling
- Established: 1984
- Mission: the study of continental philosophy
- President: Don Beith
- Website: c-scp.org

Canadian Society for Continental Philosophy (CSCP) is an organization whose purpose is to pursue and exchange philosophical ideas inspired by Continental European traditions. It was established in 1984 under the name Canadian Society for Hermeneutics and Postmodern Thought and its name changed in 2004. CSCP also publishes Symposium: Canadian Journal of Continental Philosophy and holds an annual meeting in Canada each fall.

== Past Presidents ==
- Gary Madison
- Jeff Mitscherling
- Linda Fisher
- Marty Fairbairn
- Paul Fairfield
- Diane Enns
- Iain McDonald
- Shannon Hoff
- Scott Marratto
- Laura McMahon

== See also ==
- Canadian Philosophical Association
