= Anthony Steinbock =

American philosopher and professor (born 1958)

- Born: Anthony J. Steinbock; 1958 (age 67–68)
- Awards: Symposium Book Award

Education
- Education: Stony Brook University (Ph.D., 1993)

Philosophical work
- Era: Contemporary philosophy
- Region: Western philosophy
- School: Continental
- Institutions: Stony Brook University; Southern Illinois University Carbondale
- Main interests: Contemporary French and German philosophy, phenomenology, social ontology, aesthetics

Anthony J. Steinbock (born 1958) is an American philosopher and Professor of Philosophy at Stony Brook University in New York. He is the Director of the Phenomenology Research Center, editor-in-chief of Continental Philosophy Review and a co-editor-in-chief of Phenomenological Reviews. Steinbock is known for his research on phenomenology.

== Books ==
- It’s Not about the Gift: From Givenness to Loving (2018)
- Limit-Phenomena and Phenomenology in Husserl (2017)
- Moral Emotions: Reclaiming the Evidence of the Heart (2014) Recipient of the 2015 Symposium Book Award
- Phenomenology and Mysticism: The Verticality of Religious Experience Recipient of the 2009 Edward Goodwin Ballard Book Prize in Phenomenology
- Home and Beyond: Generative Phenomenology after Husserl
- Translation of Edmund Husserl, Analyses Concerning Passive and Active Syntheses: Lectures on Transcendental Logic, Husserliana Collected Works, IX (Dordrecht: Kluwer Academic Publishers, 2001), pp. 659 + lx “Translator’s Introduction.”
