= Marie-Eve Morin =

Canadian philosopher

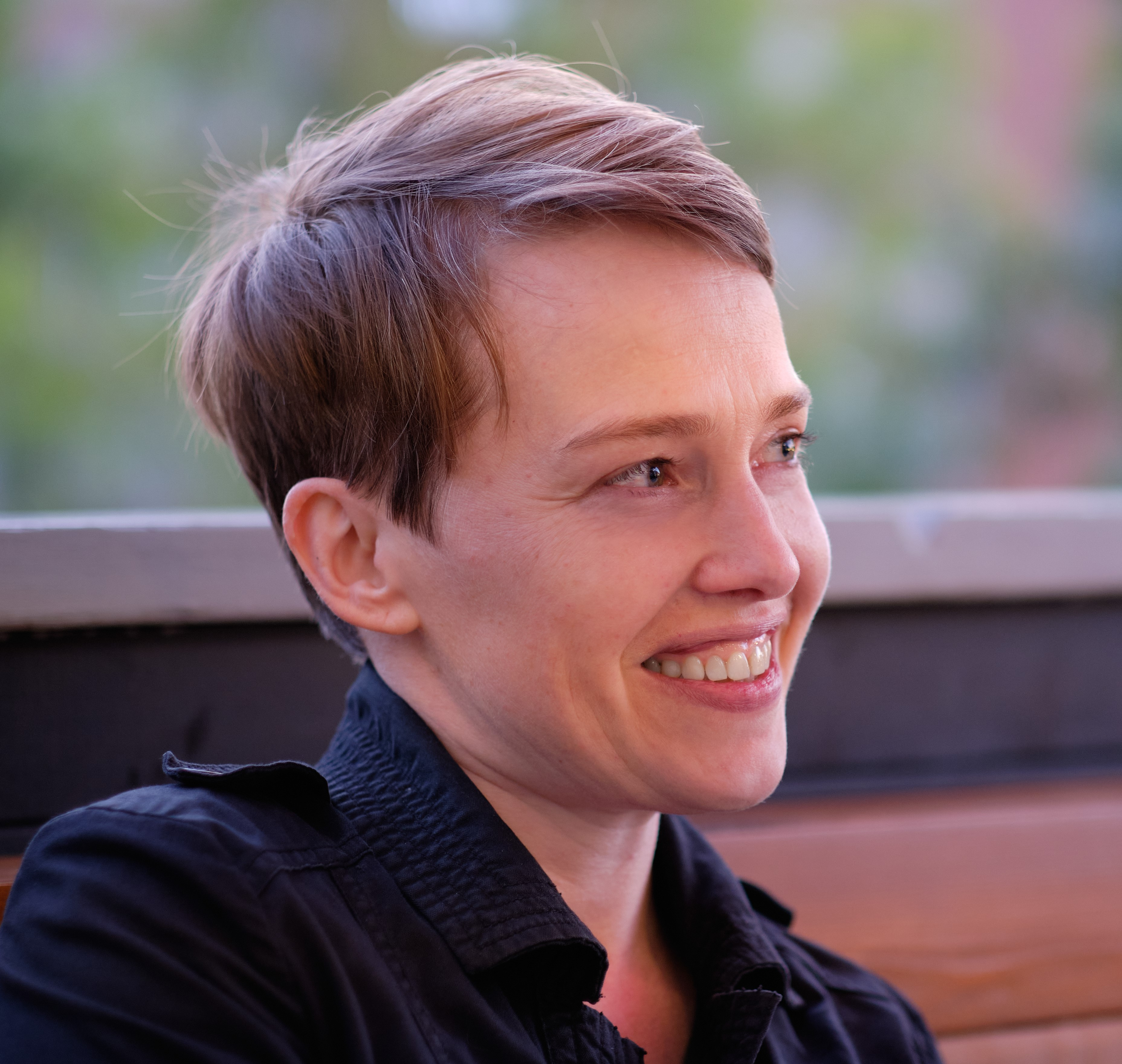
- Awards: Faculty of Arts Undergraduate Teaching Award

Education
- Education: Albert-Ludwigs Universität Freiburg (Ph.D.), McGill University (B.A.)
- Thesis: Die Frage nach der Gemeinschaft im Denken von Jacques Derrida und Jean-Luc Nancy (2005)

Philosophical work
- Era: 21st-century philosophy
- Region: Western philosophy
- School: Continental
- Institutions: University of Alberta
- Main interests: political philosophy, post-Kantian philosophy
- Website: https://apps.ualberta.ca/directory/person/mmorin1

Marie-Eve Morin is a Canadian philosopher and Professor of Philosophy at the University of Alberta. From 2012 to 2018 she was the editor-in-chief of Symposium: Canadian Journal of Continental Philosophy. Morin is known for her work on post-structuralism and post-phenomenology.

== Books ==
- Merleau-Ponty and Nancy on Sense and Being at the Limits of Phenomenology, Edinburgh University Press, 2022
- Continental Realism and Its Discontents (ed.), Edinburgh University Press, 2017
- The Nancy Dictionary (ed.), Edinburgh University Press, 2015
- Jean-Luc Nancy (Key Contemporary Thinker Series). Polity Press, 2012
- Jean-Luc Nancy and Plural Thinking: Expositions of World, Politics, Art, and Sense (ed.), SUNY Press, 2012
- Jenseits der brüderlichen Gemeinschaft. Das Gespräch zwischen Jacques Derrida und Jean-Luc Nancy, Ergon Verlag, 2006
