= William Leon McBride =

American philosopher (1938–2026)

William McBride
- Born: January 19, 1938; New York City, U.S.
- Died: April 10, 2026 (aged 88)

Education
- Education: Yale University (PhD), Georgetown University (AB)

Philosophical work
- Era: 21st-century philosophy
- Region: Western philosophy
- Institutions: Purdue University
- Main interests: political philosophy, philosophy of law

William McBride (January 19, 1938 – April 10, 2026) was an American philosopher and Arthur G. Hansen Distinguished Professor of Philosophy at Purdue University. He is known for his works on political philosophy and philosophy of law. McBride died on April 10, 2026, at the age of 88.

== Books ==
- Fundamental Change in Law and Society: Hart and Sartre on Revolution, Mouton and Co., The Hague, 1970
- The Philosophy of Marx, Hutchinson Univ. Library, London; St. Martin's Press, New York, 1977 (Routledge, 2015)
- Social Theory at a Crossroads, Duquesne University Press, Pittsburgh, 1980
- Demokrati og Autoritet (with reply by Robert A Dahl), Dreyers, Oslo, 1980
- Sartre's Political Theory, Indiana University Press, 1991
- Social and Political Philosophy, Paragon Press, 1994
- Philosophical Reflections on the Changes in Eastern Europe, Rowman & Littlefield, 1999.
- From Yugoslav Praxis to Global Pathos: Anti-Hegemonic Post-Post-Marxist Essays, Rowman & Littlefield, 2001.
