= Cynthia Willett =

American philosopher

Cynthia Willett is an American philosopher who is Samuel Candler Dobbs Professor of Philosophy at Emory University, where she is also affiliated faculty with Women, Gender, and Sexuality Studies and with the Psychoanalytic Studies Program. She has written influential books on intersectional feminism and founded Emory's Institute for the History of Philosophy. Willett was on the American Philosophical Association's Executive Board between 2008 and 2010, and has served as co-director of the Society for Phenomenology and Existential Philosophy. She earned her Ph.D. in 1988 from Pennsylvania State University.

== Education and career ==
As an undergraduate at the University of Missouri (1974–1977) and at the University of Minnesota at Minneapolis (1977–1978), Willett studied political science. She then earned a master's degree in philosophy from the University of Toronto (1979–1980). From 1981 to 1982 she did graduate work at the University of Texas at Austin in philosophy and literature. She then moved to Pennsylvania State University to work toward a Ph.D. in philosophy, which she earned in 1988, with a dissertation titled Tropes of Orientation under the direction of Carl Vaught and Irene Harvey.

After serving as an assistant professor of philosophy at Le Moyne College from 1988 to 1991, she moved to the University of Kansas (1991–1996) and then to Emory University, first as an assistant professor and then, beginning in 1998, as an associate professor. She was promoted to the rank of full professor in 2004 and received an endowed chair in 2016.

== Research areas ==
Willett specializes in ethics, social and political philosophy, critical theory, and American social thought of the 19th and 20th centuries. She has researched and written about philosophy of music, literature, tragedy, comedy, and interspecies ethics.

== Publications ==
Willett's first authored book was Maternal Ethics and Other Slave Moralities, published by Routledge in 1995. In 2001 Cornell University Press published her book, The Soul of Justice: Social Bonds and Racial Hubris. Her 2009 book Irony in the Age of Empire was praised for its novel perspective. Her book, Interspecies Ethics, was published by Columbia University Press, in August 2014. Her most recent book is Uproarious: How Feminists and Other Subversive Comics Speak Truth, co-authored with Julie Willett and published by Minnesota University Press in 2019.
