= Françoise Dastur =

French philosopher

- Born: 1942 (age 83–84); Lyon

Philosophical work
- Era: 21st century Philosophy
- Region: Western philosophy
- School: Continental
- Main interests: Existentialism, hermeneutics

Françoise Dastur (born 1942 in Lyon) is a French philosopher. She is Professor Emeritus at University of Nice Sophia Antipolis. She is a specialist of the works of Martin Heidegger.

== Bibliography ==
- Heidegger and the Question of Time (Contemporary Studies in Philosophy and the Human Sciences), translated by François Raffoul and David Pettigrew, Humanity Books, 1998
- Death: An Essay on Finitude, translated by John Llewelyn, Continuum, 2002
- Telling Time: Sketch of a Phenomenological Chronology (Athlone Contemporary European Thinkers), translated by Edward Bullard, The Athlone Press, 2000
- How Are We to Confront Death?: An Introduction to Philosophy (Perspectives in Continental Philosophy), Robert Vallier (Translator), David Farrell Krell (Foreword), Fordham University Press, 2012
- Questioning Phenomenology (Perspectives in Continental Philosophy), translated by Robert Vallier, Fordham University Press, 2011
- Heidegger et la question du temps, PUF, « Philosophies », Paris, 1990
- Hölderlin, tragédie et modernité, Encre Marine, Fougères, 1992.
- Dire le temps. Esquisse d’une chrono-logie phénoménologique, Encre Marine, Fougères, 1994, deuxième édition (Encre Marine, Livre de poche), 2002.
- La Mort. Essai sur la finitude, Hatier, Paris, 1994.
- Husserl, Des mathématiques à l’histoire, PUF, collection « Philosophies », Paris, 1995
- Hölderlin. Le retournement natal, Encre Marine, Fougères, La Versanne, 1997.
- Comment vivre avec la mort ?, Éditions Pleins feux, Nantes, 1998.
- Chair et langage. Essais sur Merleau-Ponty, Encre Marine, 2001.
- Heidegger et la question anthropologique, Peeters, Leuven, 2003.
- Philosophie et Différence, Éditions de La Transparence, 2004.
- La phénoménologie en questions : Langage, altérité, temporalité, finitude, Vrin, Paris, 2004.
- À la naissance des choses : Art, poésie et philosophie, Encre Marine, 2005.
- Comment affronter la mort ?, Bayard, Paris, 2005.
- La Mort. Essai sur la finitude, PUF, Paris, 2007.
- Heidegger. La question du logos, Vrin, Paris, 2007.
- Daseinsanalyse (avec Ph. Cabestan), Vrin, Paris, 2011.
- Heidegger et la pensée à venir, Vrin, Paris, 2011.
