= John Mueller Anderson =

American philosopher (1914–1999)

- Born: 29 July 1914
- Died: 3 December 1999 (aged 85)

Education
- Education: University of Illinois (B.A., M.A.); University of California, Berkeley (Ph.D.)
- Thesis: 1939

Philosophical work
- Era: Contemporary philosophy
- Region: Western philosophy
- School: Continental
- Institutions: Pennsylvania State University

John Mueller Anderson (29 July 1914 – 3 December 1999) was an American philosopher. He was known for his expertise on post-Kantian philosophy, philosophy of art and logic. Anderson was Evan Pugh Professor of Philosophy at the Pennsylvania State University.

== Early life and education ==
Anderson received a Bachelor of Arts (1935) and a Master of Arts (1936) from the University of Illinois at Urbana–Champaign and a Doctor of Philosophy (1939) at the University of California, Berkeley.
