= Jean-Marie Touratier =

French writer (1943–2021)

- Born: 1943
- Died: 1 February 2021 (aged 77–78); Paris, France
- Occupation: Writer

Jean-Marie Touratier (1943 – 1 February 2021) was a French writer and artistic director.

== Biography ==
Touratier earned an agrégation in modern literature and subsequently became the director of the Fonds régional d'art contemporain in Toulouse and arranged multiple art exhibitions. He then worked as a cultural advisor to the Rector of Paris, serving as an academic delegate for arts and culture. In addition to his career as an artistic director, he wrote a number of books about different works of art.

Jean-Marie Touratier died in Paris on 1 February 2021 at the age of 77 from COVID-19.

== Works ==
- T.V. Essai sur la représentation et la communication (1978)
- Farce (1979)
- Le Stéréotype. Et comment s'en servir (1979)
- Autoportraits avec ruines (1980)
- Le Mal de Seine (1980)
- Au bord des fleuves de Babylone (1982)
- Vie et légende du captain Sarkis (1986)
- Manuel pratique d'art contemporain (1987)
- Moi, le dernier des enfants d'Occident & autres textes (1991)
- Bois rouge (1993)
- Le Caravage. Fragments d'une vie violente (1997)
- L’œuvre ultime. Giovanni Cosma (1999)
- La Belle Déception du regard. Réflexions sur l’art contemporain (2001)
- Martha se tait (2003)
- Déjà la nuit. Claude Monet (2005)
- La Cicatrice (2007)
- Être humain, tome I, Carl Th. Dreyer, Ingmar Bergman (2009)
- Être humain, tome II, Yasujiro Ozu, Andreï Tarkovski (2009)
- Géricault, cheval-peintre (2012)
- Pauvre Joconde (2013)
- "Les Venimeux" (2015)
- Mauvais sang (2018)
- Le légendaire de Marcel Duchamp (2020)
