= Marc Crépon =

French philosopher and translator

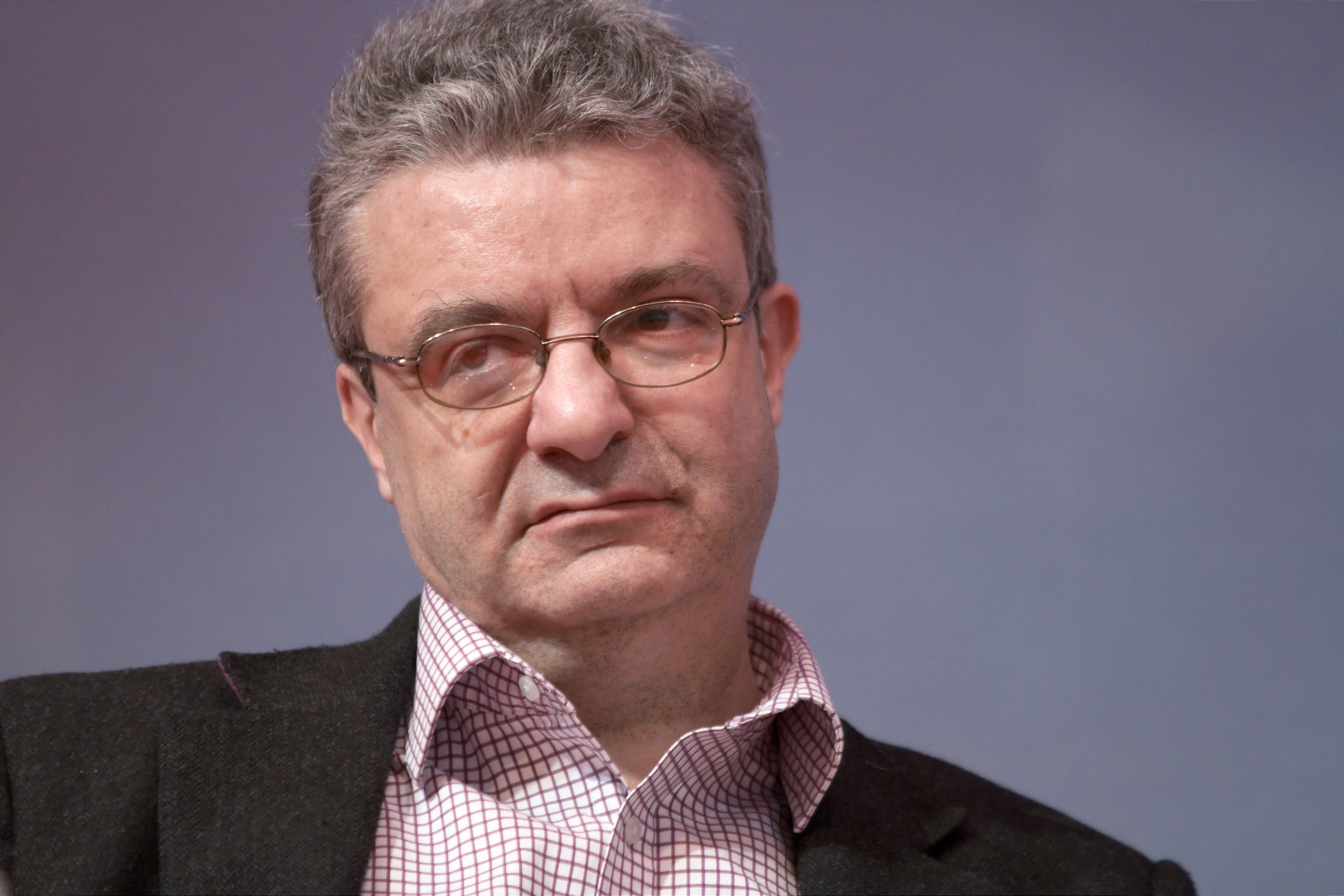
- Born: March 30, 1962 (age 64); Decize, France

Education
- Education: Lycée Condorcet, École normale supérieure
- Thesis: The problem of human diversity inquiry concerning the characteristics of peoples and the constitution of geographies of the spirit
- Doctoral advisor: Jean-François Courtine

Philosophical work
- Era: Contemporary philosophy
- Region: Western philosophy
- School: Continental philosophy
- Institutions: Paris Nanterre University, ENS, CNRS
- Main interests: Political philosophy, ethics, philosophy of language, violence, democracy

Marc Crépon (born 30 March 1962 in Decize) is a French philosopher and academic who writes on the subject of languages and communities in the French and German philosophies and contemporary political and moral philosophy.

He is also a translator of works (into French) by Gottfried Wilhelm Leibniz, Walter Benjamin, Martin Heidegger, Friedrich Nietzsche, Jan Patočka, Franz Rosenzweig, and Sigmund Freud.

He is Professor of Philosophy at the Ecole Normale Superieure, where he is also chair of the philosophy department and where he founded the transdisciplinary Graduate School of Letters and Sciences. He is also director of research at the Archives Husserl, French National Center for Scientific Research.

== Early life ==
He was born in Decize, in the Nievre department of France in 1962. After passing the baccalaureat exam to complete his secondary education in 1984, Crépon entered a preparatory course at Lycee Condorcet in Paris. He then attended the Ecole Normale Superieure and passed the agrégation in 1986.

== Academic career ==
The topic of his dissertation was The problem of human diversity: survey on the characterization of the people and the constitution of geographies of spirit from Leibniz to Hegel (1995). The supervising institution was Paris Nanterre University, where he began his academic career.

He traveled for a period in Moldova and credits living and working in the USSR with developing many of his attitudes and pedagogical methods. At this time, he also developed an interest in the relationship between political and linguistic communities, a question related to this thesis topic.

He has traveled and lectured at American universities, including University of California, Irvine and Northwestern University. Crépon delivered the University of Notre Dame’s 2008-09 Nanovic Institute Distinguished European Lecture on “The Culture of the Enemy: A Critique of Huntington from Freud and Nietzsche."

Marc Crépon was the co-founder (along with Bernard Stiegler) of the association Ars Industrialis. He was a member of the jury at Les Rencontres Philosophiques de Monaco from 2015-2025. He is a member of the PMLA, the journal of the Modern Language Association.

== Research ==
Crépon's research focuses on the "intersection of moral and political philosophy," with particular attention to violence. He emphasizes that violence is a recurring thread in his work, including L’Épreuve de la haine : essai sur le refus de la violence (2016) and La Philosophie face à la violence (2015), co-written with Frédéric Worms. His work also examines democracy, political authority, and the relationship between rulers and the governed. Crépon has explored what he describes as the paradox produced by the tension between the "verticality" of institutional power and the horizontal forms of protest, public opinion, and political contestation characteristic of democratic societies.

== Reception ==
In his foreword to the English translation of Murderous Consent, political scientist James Martel characterized Crépon's opposition to violence as unusually thorough, and described his connection between consent and murder as persuasive. Martel argued that Crépon challenges the distinctions by which individuals and political entities rationalize what murders are justified or legitimate. Philosopher Michael Naas (of DePaul University) has also examined Crépon's treatment of violence in the peer-reviewed essay "Philosophy on the Western Front: Marc Crépon and the Trials of Violence in Our Times", published in CR: The New Centennial Review in 2018.

== Publications ==
=== Translations and editions ===
- Nietzsche, Friedrich. Écrits autobiographiques : 1856–1869. Translated and annotated by Marc Crépon. Paris: Presses universitaires de France, 1994.
- Leibniz, Gottfried Wilhelm. L’Harmonie des langues. Presented, translated and commented by Marc Crépon. Paris: Éditions du Seuil, 2000.
- Rosenzweig, Franz. Foi et savoir : autour de l’Étoile de la Rédemption. Introduced, translated and annotated by Gérard Bensussan, Marc Crépon and Marc de Launay. Paris: Vrin, 2001.
- Freud, Sigmund. Anthropologie de la guerre. Translated and with commentary by Marc Crépon and Marc de Launay; postface by Alain Badiou. Paris: Fayard, 2010.

=== Books ===
- Les Géographies de l’esprit : enquête sur la caractérisation des peuples de Leibniz à Hegel. Paris: Payot, 1996.
- La Langue source de la nation : messianismes séculiers et Europe centrale et orientale, with Pierre Caussat and Dariusz Adamski. Mardaga, 1996.
- Le Malin génie des langues : essais sur Nietzsche, Heidegger, Rosenzweig. Paris: Librairie philosophique J. Vrin, 2000.
- Les Promesses du langage : Benjamin, Rosenzweig, Heidegger. Paris: Vrin, 2001.
- L’Imposture du choc des civilisations. Nantes: Pleins Feux, 2002.
- Nietzsche : l’art et la politique de l’avenir. Paris: Presses Universitaires de France, 2003.
- Terreur et poésie. Paris: Éditions Galilée, 2004.
- Langues sans demeure. Paris: Galilée, 2005.
- Altérités de l’Europe. Paris: Galilée, 2006.
- De la démocratie participative : fondements et limites, with Bernard Stiegler. Paris: Mille et une nuits, 2007.
- La Culture de la peur : démocratie, identité, sécurité. Paris: Galilée, 2008.
- Vivre avec : la pensée de la mort et la mémoire des guerres. Paris: Éditions Hermann, 2008.
- La Guerre des civilisations : la culture de la peur II. Paris: Galilée, 2010.
- Le Consentement meurtrier. Paris: Éditions du Cerf, 2012.
- Élections : de la démophobie. Paris: Hermann, 2012.
- La Vocation de l’écriture : la littérature et la philosophie à l’épreuve de la violence. Paris: Éditions Odile Jacob, 2014.
- La Philosophie face à la violence, with Frédéric Worms. Paris: Équateurs, 2015.
- La Gauche, c’est quand ?. Paris: Équateurs, 2015.
- L’Épreuve de la haine : essai sur le refus de la violence. Paris: Odile Jacob, 2016.
- Inhumaines conditions : combattre l’intolérable. Paris: Odile Jacob, 2018.
- Ces temps-ci : la société à l’épreuve des affaires de mœurs. Paris: Payot & Rivages, 2020.
- Le Désir de résister : un esprit critique pour notre temps. Paris: Odile Jacob, 2022.
- L’Héritage des langues : éthique et politique du dire, de l’écrire et du traduire. Séminaire 2020–2021. Paris: Fayard, 2022.
- Journal de Moldavie : 1987–1988, juillet 2022. Lagrasse: Verdier, 2023.
- Sept leçons sur la violence. Paris: Odile Jacob, 2024.
- Le Spectre du nationalisme. Paris: Odile Jacob, 2025.

==== English translations ====
(in order by year of translation)

- "The Memory of the Wars." CR: The New Centennial Review, 13(1), (2013) 1–18. Translated by Michael Stanish.
- The Thought of Death and the Memory of War, translated by Michael Loriaux, foreword by Rodolphe Gasché. Minneapolis: University of Minnesota Press, 2013. Translation of Vivre avec : la pensée de la mort et la mémoire des guerres (2008).
- The Vocation of Writing: Literature, Philosophy, and the Test of Violence, translated by D. J. S. Cross and Tyler M. Williams. Albany: State University of New York Press, 2018. Translation of La Vocation de l’écriture : la littérature et la philosophie à l’épreuve de la violence (2014).
- Murderous Consent: On the Accommodation of Violent Death, translated by Michael Loriaux, foreword by James Martel. New York: Fordham University Press, 2019. Translation of Le Consentement meurtrier (2012).
- The Trial of Hatred: An Essay on the Refusal of Violence, translated by D. J. S. Cross and Tyler M. Williams. Edinburgh: Edinburgh University Press, 2022. Translation of L’Épreuve de la haine : essai sur le refus de la violence (2016).

=== Selected periodicals & chapters ===
- (1998). "Le Jeu de Kant et Spinoza dans le Livre XV des 'Idées sur la Philosophie de L'Histoire de L'Humanité." Les Études Philosophiques, (3), 389–402.
- (1999). "La langue sans communauté. Améry, Adorno, Arendt et la langue maternelle." Rue Descartes, (26), 117–140.
- (2004). "La traduction entre les cultures," Revue germanique internationale, 21. Digitized 19 September 2011, accessed 10 septembre 2026.
- (2004). "Penser l’Europe avec Patočkà. Réflexions sur l’altérité." Esprit 310 (12, 28–44.
- (2005). "L'éternel retour et la pensée de la mort." Les Études philosophiques, 73(2), 193-202.
- (2006). Traduire, témoigner, survivre. Rue Descartes, 52(2), 27-38.
- (2006). "Deconstruction and Translation: The Passage into Philosophy." Research in Phenomenology, 36(1), 299-313.
- (2007). "La guerre continue: Note sur le sens du monde et la pensée de la mort." Studia Phænomenologica, 7(7), 395-408.
- (2008). "L'imaginaire de la mort : une responsabilité éthique et politique." Cités, 33(1), 53-61.
- (2011). Fear, Courage, Anger: The Socratic Lesson. In: Abrams, E., Chvatík, I. (eds) Jan Patočka and the Heritage of Phenomenology. Contributions To Phenomenology, vol 61. Springer, Dordrecht.
- (2015). "The invention of the idiom: the event of the untranslatable." Paragraph (journal), 38(2), 189-203.
- (2020). "La Philosophie à l’épreuve du terrorisme. Une lecture croisée de Habermas et Derrida." Contemporary French and Francophone Studies, 24(4), 373–389.
- (2020). "De la démocratie participative, à la croisée des chemins." Pouvoirs, 175(4), 31-42.
