= Frédéric Neyrat =

French philosopher

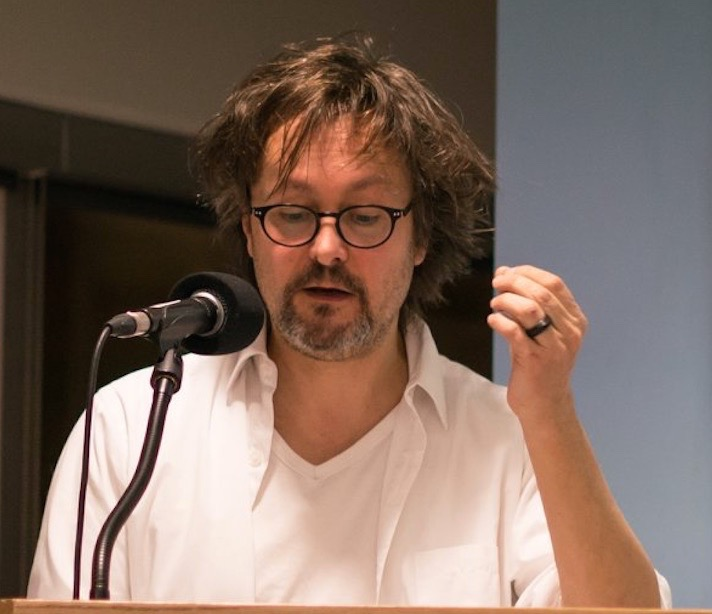
Frédéric Neyrat

Frédéric Neyrat is a French philosopher with expertise in environmental humanities, contemporary theory, and media culture. He is a professor in the English department of UW-Madison (USA), contributor on the electronic platform Alienocene, and a member of the editorial board of the journals Lignes and Multitudes. He wrote The Unconstructable Earth: An Ecology of separation, Literature and Materialisms, L’Ange Noir de l’Histoire: Cosmos et Technique de l’Afrofuturisme (MF, 2021), Cosmos Expérimental, and Le Cosmos de Walter Benjamin: Un Communisme du Lointain.

== Works ==
- Traumachine: Intelligence Artificielle et Techno-fascisme (Paris, Éditions MF). 2025.
- Le Cosmos de Walter Benjamin: Un Communisme du Lointain (Walter Benjamin's Cosmos: A Communism of the Distance) (Paris, Kimé). 2022.
- Cosmos Expérimental (Experimental Cosmos) (Zürich, Abrüpt). 2022
- L’Ange Noir de l’Histoire: Cosmos et Technique de l’Afrofuturisme (The Black Angel of History: Cosmos and Technics of Afrofuturism) (Paris, Éditions MF). 2021.
- Literature and Materialisms (Routledge). 2020.
- The Unconstructable Earth: An Ecology of separation (New York, Fordham University Press). Translated from the French La Part inconstructible de la Terre 2018.
- Echapper à l’horreur. Court traité des interruptions merveilleuses (Fécamp, Nouvelles Editions Lignes). With a preface by Jean-Luc Nancy. 2017. Translated in Dutch as Ontsnappen aan de verschrikking: Essay over wonderlijke onderbrekingen by Wouter Kusters (Lontano, 2021).
- Atopias. Manifesto for a Radical Existentialism (trans. Walt Hunter and Lindsay Turner, preface by Steven Shaviro). Translated from French Atopies. Manifeste pour la Philosophie. 2017.
- La Part inconstructible de la Terre. Critique du Géo-constructivisme (Paris, Éditions du Seuil). 2016.
- Homo Labyrinthus. Humanisme, antihumanisme, posthumanisme (Bellevaux, Editions Dehors). 2015.
- Atopies. Manifeste pour la Philosophie. 2014.
- Le Communisme existentiel de Jean-Luc Nancy. 2013.
- Clinamen. Flux, absolu et loi spirale (Paris, e®e). 2011.
- Le terrorisme, un concept piégé (Paris, e®e - a new edition of Le terrorisme. La tentation de l’abyme (Paris, Larousse, 2009)). 223 pages.
- Instructions pour une prise d’âmes. Artaud et l’envoûtement occidental (Paris, La Phocide). 2009.
- Biopolitique des catastrophes. La politique sur le qui-vive (Paris, MF). 2008.
- L’indemne. Heidegger et la destruction du monde (Paris, Sens et Tonka, “Collège International de Philosophie” series). 2008.
- Surexposés. Le Monde, le Capital, la Terre (Paris, Lignes – Manifeste). 2.005.
- L’image hors-l’image (Paris, Leo Scheer). 2003.
- S (Paris, L’Harmattan). 2002
