= Joseph J. Kockelmans =

American philosopher

Joseph J. Kockelmans (Dutch: [ˈkɔkəlmɑns]; December 1, 1923 – September 28, 2008) was a Dutch-born American philosopher and Distinguished Professor Emeritus of Philosophy at the Pennsylvania State University.

He was born in Meerssen, Netherlands, and died in State College, Pennsylvania. He earned his doctorate in 1951 from Collegio Angelico.
