= Cristian Ciocan =

Romanian philosopher

- Born: 1974 (age 51–52)

Education
- Education: University of Bucharest (Habil, 2015; PhD, 2006), University of Paris IV – Sorbonne (PhD, 2009)

Philosophical work
- Era: 21st-century philosophy
- Region: Western philosophy
- School: Continental
- Institutions: University of Bucharest, Romanian Society for Phenomenology

Cristian Ciocan (born 1974) is a Romanian philosopher and a member of the Doctoral School of Philosophy at the University of Bucharest. He is also a senior researcher at the Research Institute of the University of Bucharest (ICUB). Ciocan is known for his work on Heidegger's philosophy. He is the Editor-in-Chief of the journal Studia Phaenomenologica.

== Books ==
- Ciocan C. (2022), Violență și animalitate: explorări fenomenologice, Spandugino & Zeta Books.
- Ciocan C. (2014), Heidegger et le problème de la mort: existentialité, authenticité, temporalité (Dordrecht: Springer, “Phaenomenologica” Series, vol. 211)
- Ciocan C. (2013), Întruchipări. Studiu de fenomenologie a corporalității (Bucharest: Humanitas).
- Ciocan C. (2007), Moribundus sum. Heidegger și problema morții (Bucharest: Humanitas).
- Ciocan C., Hansel G. (2005), Levinas Concordance (Dordrecht: Springer).
