= Walter Biemel =

Romanian–German philosopher (1918–2015)

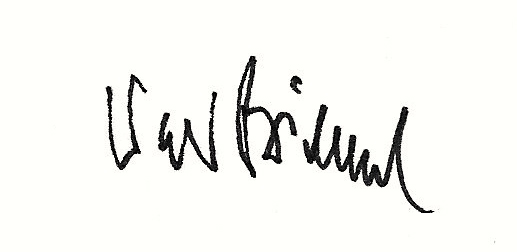
Walter Biemel's signature

Walter Biemel (February 19, 1918, Topčider, Kingdom of Serbia – March 6, 2015, Aachen) was a Serbian-born German philosopher.

== Life and work ==
Biemel grew up in Kronstadt, Transylvania as the son of the director of the Kronstadt Philharmonic Orchestra, he studied philosophy, psychology, sociology and art history in Bucharest from 1937 to 1941 under Mircea Eliade, among others. In 1942, Biemel went to University of Freiburg with the draft of an unrealized dissertation on the concept of nature (Naturbegriff) in Novalis. Instead, he became a student of Martin Heidegger and developed his own areas of specialization in phenomenology and the philosophy of art.

After the closure of Freiburg University in the fall of 1944, Biemel went to the Husserl Archive in Leuven, where he wrote his treatise on Heidegger's concept of the world (Weltbegriff) in French, for which he received his doctorate in University of Cologne in 1950. He edited several volumes of the Husserliana and the Heidegger-Werkausgabe. While working at the Husserl Archive in Cologne, he wrote his habilitation thesis on significance of Kant's grounding of aesthetics for the philosophy of art, with which he habilitated at the University of Cologne. From 1962 until his retirement, he taught as emeritus of philosophy at the Institute of Philosophy at the Rheinisch-Westfälische Technische Hochschule Aachen and from 1978 as a professor of philosophy of art at the Kunstakademie Düsseldorf.

Walter Biemel's life and thinking were characterized by a lifelong, intensive engagement with modern art and literature; this is the basis of his art-philosophical approach. Since the establishment of the Museum Insel Hombroich, he has been closely associated with the Kulturraum Hombroich as an advisor for the philosophy section, both with the founding of the colloquium series Hombroich: Philosophie and with his commitment to the Raumortlabor Hombroich project. Walter Biemel has donated his entire archival and library estate to the Stiftung Insel Hombroich. His older brother Rainer Biemel became known in France as a Rilke translator and writer under the pseudonym Jean Rounault.

== Honors ==
- 1997 Siebenbürgisch-Sächsischer Kulturpreis
- Seit 2000 Ehrenpräsident der Rumänischen Gesellschaft für Phänomenologie
- 2003 Doctor honoris causa der Universität Bukarest

== Publications (selection) ==
=== Books ===
- Le concept de monde chez Heidegger. Nauwelaerts, Louvain 1950, 2. Auflage 1981
- Die Bedeutung von Kants Begründung der Ästhetik für die Philosophie der Kunst. Kölner Universitätsverlag, Köln 1959
- Jean-Paul Sartre (Rowohlts Monographie). 1964, 26. Auflage 1995
- Philosophische Analysen zur Kunst der Gegenwart. 1968
- (Herausgeber:) Phänomenologie heute, Festschrift für Ludwig Landgrebe. 1972
- Martin Heidegger (Rowohlts Monographie). 1973, 16. Auflage 2002
- (Herausgeber:) Die Welt des Menschen – die Welt der Philosophie. Festschrift für Jan Patočka. 1976
- Zeitigung und Romanstruktur. Philosophische Analysen zur Deutung des modernen Romans. Alber, Freiburg / München 1985, ISBN 3-495-47548-6
- Gesammelte Schriften Bd. 1. Schriften zur Philosophie. Frommann-Holzboog, Stuttgart-Bad Cannstatt 1996
- Gesammelte Schriften Bd. 2. Schriften zur Kunst. Frommann-Holzboog, Stuttgart-Bad Cannstatt 1996

=== Editions ===
- Edmund Husserl: Die Idee der Phänomenologie. Fünf Vorlesungen, Den Haag: Nijhoff, 1950 (Hua II)
- Edmund Husserl: Ideen zu einer reinen Phänomenologie und phänomenologischen Philosophie. Erstes Buch, Allgemeine Einführung in die reine Phänomenologie, Den Haag: Nijhoff, 1950 (Hua III)
- Edmund Husserl: Die Krisis der europäischen Wissenschaften und die transzendentale Phänomenologie. Eine Einleitung in die phänomenologische Philosophie, Den Haag: Nijhoff, 1954 (Hua VI)
- Edmund Husserl: Phänomenologische Psychologie. Vorlesungen Sommersemester 1925, Den Haag: Nijhoff, 1961 (Hua IX)
- (Die Bände gehören zur Husserliana: Gesammelte Werke. Aufgrund des Nachlasses veröffentlicht in Gemeinschaft mit dem Husserl-Archiv an der Universität Köln vom Husserl-Archiv in Löwen und enthalten ein Vorwort des Herausgebers.)
- Phänomenologie heute. Festschrift für Ludwig Landgrebe, Phaenomenologica, Bd. 51, Den Haag: Nijhoff, 1972
- Martin Heidegger: Logik. Die Frage nach der Wahrheit (Gesamtausgabe, Bd. 21), Frankfurt a. M.: Klostermann, 1976; 2., durchges. Aufl. 1995
- Die Welt des Menschen, die Welt der Philosophie. Festschrift für Jan Pato?ka, Phaenomenologica, Bd. 72, Den Haag: Nijhoff, 1976
- Kunst und Technik. Gedächtnisschrift zum 100. Geburtstag von Martin Heidegger, (gemeinsam mit Friedrich-Wilhelm von Herrmann), Frankfurt a. M.: Klostermann, 1989
- Martin Heidegger / Karl Jaspers: Briefwechsel 1920–1963 (gemeinsam mit Hans Saner), Frankfurt a. M.: Klostermann, und München / Zürich: Piper, 1992
- Martin Heidegger: Hölderlins Hymne „Der Ister“ (Freiburger Vorlesung SS 1942, Gesamtausgabe, Bd. 53), Frankfurt a. M.: Klostermann, 11984, 21993

=== Essays ===
1. „Heideggers Begriff des Daseins“, in: Studia Catholica, 24. Jg., Juni 1949, 113–130, Nimwegen
2. „Husserls Encyclopaedia Britannica-Artikel und Heideggers Anmerkungen dazu“, in: Tijdschrift voor philosophie, Leuven [u. a.], 12 (1950), 246–280, ; wieder veröffentlicht in: Wege der Forschung, Bd. XL: Husserl, Darmstadt: Wiss. Buchgesellschaft, 1973, 282–315; aufgenommen in Gesammelte Werke, Bd. 1, 1996, 173–207
3. „Heideggers Schrift Vom Wesen der Wahrheit“ (gemeinsam mit Alphonse de Waehlens), in: Symposion, Bd. III, Freiburg i. Br., 1952, 471–508; aufgenommen in Gesammelte Werke, Bd. 1, 1996, 209–263
4. „Über den Neid“, in: Rencontre / Encounter / Begegnung. Festschrift für Frederik J. J. Buytendijk, Utrecht/Antwerpen: Spectrum, 1957, 40–49; aufgenommen in Gesammelte Werke, Bd. 1, 1996, 11–23
5. „Das Wesen der Dialektik bei Hegel und Sartre“, in: Tijdschrift voor philosophie, Leuven, 20 (1958), 269–300; aufgenommen in Gesammelte Werke, Bd. 1, 1996, 25–57
6. Einleitung zum Husserl-Text: „Die Philosophie als menschheitliche Selbstverwirklichung der Vernunft“, in: Deucalion: cahiers de philosophie, Bd. III, Neuchâtel: Ed. de la Baconnière, 1950, 109–115
7. „Einleitung zum Briefwechsel Dilthey–Husserl“, in: Revista de filosofia de la Universidad de Costa Rica, San Jose, 1 (1957), 103–107
8. Vorwort zur französischen Übersetzung von Heideggers Kant und das Problem der Metaphysik (gemeinsam mit Alphonse de Waehlens), Paris: Gallimard, 1953, 9–50
9. „Die entscheidenden Phasen von Husserls Philosophieren“, in: Zeitschrift für Philosophische Forschung ‚Husserl-Festschrift‘, Bd. XIII, 187–213, 1959; wieder abgedruckt in dem Band Phänomenologie, Darmstadt: Wiss. Buchgesellschaft, 1973 und wieder aufgenommen in Gesammelte Werke, Bd. 1, 1996, 59–95
10. „Zur transzendentalen Phänomenologie von G. Funke“, in: Archivio di Filosofia, Roma, 1960, 133–141
11. „Fortschritt der Technik – Fortschritt der Menschheit?“, in: Der Fortschrittsglaube – Sinn und Gefahren. Festschrift für Kardinal König, Studien der Wiener Katholischen Akademie, Graz/Wien/Köln: Styria, 1965, 53–68
12. „Versuch einer Deutung von Picassos Polyperspektivität“, in: Actes du IVème Congrès international d’Esthétique, Athènes, 1960, 705–709
13. „L’ironia romantica y la filosofia del idealismo alemán“, in: Convivium, Bd. XIII, Barcelona, 1961, 29–48
14. „L’ironie romantique et la philosophie de l’idealisme allemand“, in: Revue Philosophique de Louvain, 61 (1963), 627–643
15. „Platon und die Sophisten“, in: Alma Mater Aquensis, 1963, Aachen, 59–66
16. „La transformación de la filosofia“, in: Eco. Revista de la cultura de Occidente, Bd. VIII, Nr. 46, Februar 1964, 397–407
17. „Kafkas Erzählung Poseidon“, in: Sur, März–April 1964, 1–6 (in spanischer Übersetzung)
18. „L’ambiguïté de la technique“, in: Tecnica e Casistica. Atti del Convegno indetto dal Centro internazionale di studi umanistici e dall’ Istituto di studi filosofici, Roma, 7–12 gennaio 1964. A cura di Enrico Castelli, Roma: Istituto di studi filosofici, 1964, 319–328
19. „Hölderlins Hymne: Der Einzige“ (spanische Übersetzung der Deutung), in: Convivium, Bd. 13/14, Barcelona, 1962, 3–26
20. „Von Kant bis Hegel“ (spanische Übersetzung der Vorlesung gehalten an der Universität Barcelona, 1962), in: Convivium, Bd. 13/14, Barcelona, 1962, 69–146
21. „Hegels Ästhetik“ (spanische Übersetzung der Vorlesung gehalten an der Universität Barcelona, 1962), in: Convivium, Bd. 13/14, Barcelona, 1962, 147–162
22. „Sartres Deutung des Leibes“ (spanische Übersetzung), in: Convivium, Bd. 21, Barcelona, 1966, 65–76
23. „Réflexions à propos des recherches husserliennes de la Lebenswelt“, in: Tijdschrift voor filosofie, Leuven [u. a.], 33 (1971), 659–683
24. „Reflexionen zur Lebenswelt-Problematik“, in: Phänomenologie heute. Festschrift für Ludwig Landgrebe, Phaenomenologica, Bd. 51, Den Haag: Nijhoff, 1972, 49–77; wieder aufgenommen in Gesammelte Werke, Bd. 1, 1996, 97–129
25. „Pop-Art und Lebenswelt“, in: Aachener Kunstblätter, Bd. 40, Aachen, 1971, 194–214; „Pop Art and the Lived World“, englische Übersetzung von Edward G. Ballard und Alexander von Schönborn, in Life-world and Consciousness: Essays for Aron Gurwitsch, edited by Lester E. Embree, Evanston, Ill.: Northwestern University Press, 1972, 489–519; jugoslawische Übersetzung in: Umetnost 32 (1972), Belgrad, 45–52; Wiederabdruck in: Ästhetik, Wege der Forschung, Bd. 31, hrsg. v. Wolfhart Henckmann, Darmstadt: Wissenschaftliche Buchgesellschaft, 1979, 148–189; wieder aufgenommen in Gesammelte Werke, Bd. 2, 1996, 67–115
26. „Kunst und Situation“, in: Philosophische Perspektiven, hg. v. Rudolph Berlinger u. Eugen Fink, Bd. 4, Frankfurt a. M.: Klostermann, 1972, 27–42; unter dem Titel „Kunst und Situation – Bemerkungen zu einem Aspekt der aktuellen Kunst“ wieder aufgenommen in Gesammelte Werke, Bd. 2, 1996, 117–144
27. „Dichtung und Sprache bei Heidegger“, in: Man and World (1969); englische Übersetzung „Poetry and Language in Heidegger“, in: On Heidegger and Language, hrsg. v. J. Kockelmans, Evanston: Northwestern University Press, 1972, 65–106; tschechische Übersetzung in Filosoficky Casopis, 5–6 (1969), 768–788, Veröffentlichung der Tschekoslowakischen Akademie der Wissenschaften, Prag
28. „Zum Problem der Wiederholung in der Kunst der Gegenwart“, in: Aachener Kunstblätter, Bd. 43, 1972, 282–296; wieder abgedruckt in: Sprache und Begriff. Festschrift für Bruno Liebrucks, hrsg. v. Heinz Rüttges, Meisenheim am Glan: Hain, 1974, 269–291; wieder aufgenommen in Gesammelte Werke, Bd. 2, 1996, 145–178
29. Artikel „Phenomenology“ in der Encyclopædia Britannica (gemeinsam mit Herbert Spiegelberg), Chicago: Encyclopædia Britannica, Ausg. 1974
30. „Metaphysik und Technik“, in: Alma Mater Aquensis. Festschrift für Graf Stenbock-Fermor, Aachen, 1973, 43–49
31. „Die Phänomenologie des Geistes und die Hegel-Renaissance in Frankreich“, in: Akten des Hegel-Kongresses in Stuttgart, 1975, 643–655
32. „Das Wesen der Lust bei Kant“, in: Bewußt sein: Gerhard Funke zu eigen, hrsg. v. Alexius J. Bucher, Bonn: Bouvier, 1975
33. „L’interprétation heideggérienne du Sacré chez Hölderlin“, in: Prospettive sul Sacre, a cura di Enrico Castelli, Roma, 1974, 185–198
34. „Heideggers Deutung des Heiligen bei Hölderlin“, in: Theologische Forschung, Bd. 58 (Kerygma und Mythos 6, 7), Hamburg/Bergstedt, 1976, 181–190
35. „Der Beginn von Prousts À la recherche du temps perdu“, in: Die Welt des Menschen, die Welt der Philosophie. Festschrift für Jan Pato?ka, hrsg. v. Walter Biemel und dem Husserl-Archiv zu Löwen, Phaenomenologica, Bd. 72, Den Haag: Nijhoff, 1976, 285–300
36. „Erinnerungen an Martin Heidegger“, in: Allgemeine Zeitschrift für Philosophie, hrsg. v. der Allgemeinen Gesellschaft für Philosophie in Deutschland, Stuttgart: Frommann, 1 (1976), 1–23
37. „Heidegger und die Metaphysik“, englische Übersetzung von Th. Sheehan in der Gedenknummer für Heidegger der Zeitschrift Listening, 12 (1977), 50–61
38. „Erinnerungsfragmente“, in: Erinnerung an Martin Heidegger, hrsg. v. Günther Neske, Pfullingen: Neske, 1977, 15–24
39. „Laudatio für Jan Pato?ka“, in: Mensch, Welt, Verständigung: Perspektiven einer Phänomenologie der Kommunikation, Phänomenologische Forschungen, Bd. 4, Freiburg, München: Alber, 1977, 131–137
40. „Heidegger und die Phänomenologie in der Marburger Zeit“, in: Husserl, Scheler, Heidegger in der Sicht neuer Quellen, Phänomenologische Forschungen, Bd. 6/7, Freiburg i. Br., München: Alber, 1978, 141–223; unter dem Titel „Heideggers Stellung zur Phänomenologie in der Marburger Zeit“ wieder aufgenommen in Gesammelte Werke, Bd. 1, 1996, 265–333
41. „Die Bedeutung der Zeit für die Deutung des Romans“, in: Archivio di Filosofia, Roma, 1980, 333–341
42. Katalog-Text für Norbert Kricke, anlässlich der Ausstellung in Moderne Galerie, 27. April bis 25. Mai 1980, Quadrat, Bottrop, Hrsg. Stadt Bottrop, 1980
43. „Doxa und Episteme im Umkreis der Krisis-Thematik“, in: Lebenswelt und Wissenschaft in der Philosophie Edmund Husserls, hrsg. v. Elisabeth Ströker, Frankfurt a. M.: Klostermann, 1979, 10–22; unter dem Titel „Zur Bedeutung von ???? und ???????? im Umkreis der Krisis-Thematik“ wieder aufgenommen in Gesammelte Werke, Bd. 1, 1996, 131–146
44. „Philosophie und Kunst“, in: Aachener Kunstblätter, Bd. 48, Aachen, 1978/79, 219–228; „Philosophy and Art“, englische Übersetzung von Parvis Emad, in: Man and World, 12 (1979), 267–283
45. „Zur Komposition und Einheit der Holzwege“, in: Das literarische Wort, in jugoslawischer Übersetzung, 10. Oktober 977, 25. Oktober 1977, 10. November 1977; unter demselben Titel in: Concordia, 2(1982), hrsg. v. Betancourt, Aachen, 67–80; „On the Composition and Unity of Holzwege“, transl. by Michael E. Zimmermann, in: Continental Philosophy in America, Ed. Hugh J. Silverman, John Sallis, and Thomas M. Seebohm, Pittsburgh: Duquesne University Press, 1983, 93–114; dt. Fassung wieder aufgenommen in Gesammelte Werke, Bd. 1, 1996, 335–352
46. „La signification de Heidegger para la filosofia del siglo XX“. Vortrag beim Interamerikanischen Philosophie-Kongress in Caracas, veröffentlicht in: La filosofia en America. Trabajos presentados en el IX Congreso Interamericano de Filosofia, Bd. II, 161–165, Caracas: Sociedad Venezolana de Filosofía, 1979
47. „Überlegungen zur Graphik von Rolf Sackenheim“, Galerie am Bismarckplatz, Herbst 1979
48. „The Development of Heidegger’s Concept of the Thing“, in: The Southwestern Journal of Philosophy, XI (1980), Norman, Okla: Southwestern Journal of Philosophy, etc., 47–64; die dt. Fassung mit dem Titel „Die Entfaltung von Heideggers Ding-Begriff“ wurde aufgenommen in Gesammelte Werke, Bd. 1, 1996, 353–378
49. „Kritische Bemerkungen zu Alberts Kritik an der Hermeneutik und an Heidegger“, in: Wissen – Glaube – Politik. Festschrift für Paul Asveld, hrsg. v. Winfried Gruber, Jean Ladrière, Norbert Leser, unter Mitarbeit von Otto König, Florian Uhl, Graz, Wien, Köln: Styria, 1981, 19–31
50. „Sartres Leben als sein Werk“, in: Herrenalber Texte, 30 (1981), hrsg. v. Wolfgang Böhme, 1–27
51. „Heidegger and Metaphysics“, transl. by Thomas Sheehan, in: Heidegger. The Man and the Thinker, edited by Thomas Sheehan, Chicago (Ill.): Precedent Publishing, Inc., 1981, 163–172
52. „Die Entgrenzung des Tafelbildes“ (Zu den Arbeiten von Gerhard Hoehme) in der Galerie Zimmer, Düsseldorf, 1982, übernommen im Katalog der Modernen Galerie des Saarland-Museums, Saarbrücken, 1982
53. „Jean-Paul Sartre: Die Faszination der Freiheit“, in: Grundprobleme der großen Philosophen, Philosophie der Gegenwart Bd. V, Göttingen: Vandenhoeck & Ruprecht, 1982, 87–125
54. „Martin Heidegger: Amintiri“ (Erinnerungen), auf Rumänisch, in: Ethos, Paris, 1982, 120–129
55. „Zu Erwin Heerichs Arbeiten“, in: Jahresgabe des Krefelder Kunstvereins, 1982; (unter dem Titel „Zu Erwin Heerichs Arbeiten – Ausstellung in Schloss Morsbroich, 14.11.1980“ wieder aufgenommen in Gesammelte Werke, Bd. 2, 1996, 317–323)
56. „Gedanken zum Werk von Norbert Kricke“, in: Akademiezeitung 2, Düsseldorf, 1983; „The Presence of Space-Time in the Work of Norbert Kricke“, englische Übersetzung von A. von Schoenborn, in: Essays in memory of Aron Gurwitsch, edited by Lester Embree, Washington, D.C.: Center for Advanced Research in Phenomenology & University Press in America, 1983, chapter 9, 157–169
57. „Die Frage nach dem Kunstwerk“, in: Neue Museen für Schleswig-Holstein – Kunst und Kunstbetrieb, hrsg. im Auftrag des Landeskulturverbandes v. Jürgen Jensen, Klaus Juhl u. Brigitte Schubert-Riese, Neumünster, 1982, 95–106
58. „Zur Komposition und Einheit der Holzwege“, in: Concordia 2 (1982), 67–80; englische Übersetzung v. Michael E. Zimmermann, in: Continental Philosophy in America, edited by. Hugh J. Silverman, John Sallis & Thomas M. Seebohm, Pittsburgh: Duquesne University Press, 1983, 93–114
59. „Zur Realitätsträchtigkeit des Irrealen“, in: Sozialität und Intersubjektivität: phänomenologische Perspektiven der Sozialwissenschaften im Umkreis von Aron Gurwitsch und Alfred Schütz, eds. Richard Grathoff and Bernhard Waldenfels, Munich: Fink, 1983, 252–271
60. „Die Wahrheit der Metaphysik – die Wahrheit der Kunst“. Vortrag an der Universität Genf, 1984; spanische Fassung „La verdad de la metafisica. La verdad del arte“ erschienen in: Cultura y existencia humana: homenaje al Prof. Jorge Uscatescu, hrsg. v. José Antonio Merino, Madrid, 1985, 39–56; wieder abgedruckt in: Heideggeriana, hrsg. v. Giampiero Moretti, Itinerari, 1986, 17–35; dt. Fassung aufgenommen in Gesammelte Werke, Bd. 2, 1996, 7–28
61. „L’idée de la phénoménologie chez Husserl“, in: Phénoménologie et métaphysique, Coll. Epiméthée, hrsg. v. J. L. Marion u. G. Planty Bonjour, Paris: P.U.F., 1984, 81–105; die dt. Fassung mit dem Titel „Die Idee der Phänomenologie bei Husserl“ wurde aufgenommen in Gesammelte Werke, Bd. 1, 1996, 147–171
62. „Die Stimmkraft der offenen Bilder von Gerhard Hoehme“, in: Gerhard Hoehme: das offene Bild, Ausstellungskatalog des Kunstvereins Braunschweig, der Overbeck-Gesellschaft, Lübeck, Galerie Metta Linde, Lübeck; hrsg. v. Wilhelm Bojescul, Braunschweig-Lübeck, 1984, 7–18; wieder aufgenommen in Gesammelte Werke, Bd. 2, 1996, 179–211
63. „Zu Celans letztem Gedicht aus dem Zyklus Atemkristall“, in der Zeitschrift Ximera (spanische Übersetzung von Rafael Gutiérrez), Barcelona, 1983
64. „Und wozu Künstler in dürftiger Zeit?“ Eröffnungsansprache zur Ausstellung Druckgraphik und Bücher von Daniel Hees, Januar 1984, in der Villa Waldrich/Siegen, veröffentlicht in: Studienfach Bildende Kunst, Universität-Gesamthochschule Siegen, [3–9]
65. „Il Problema del Sapere dell’uomo nell’epoca della Tecnologia“, in: Nuova Civiltà delle Macchine, Anno II, Primavera 1984, No. 2, 41–47, a cura di Francesco Barone e Francesco d’Arcais
66. „Bemerkungen zu Jan Pato?kas Deutung der Kunst“, in: Studien zur Philosophie von Jan Pato?ka, Phänomenologische Forschungen, Bd. 17, hrsg. v. Ernst Wolfgang Orth, Freiburg, München: Alber, 1985, 32–52
67. „Die neue Zeitauffassung im Werk von Bernd Alois Zimmermann“, in: Bernd Alois Zimmermann. Dokumente und Interpretationen, hrsg. v. Wulf Konold, Köln: Wienand, 1986, 117–124; erweiterte Fassung mit dem Titel „Das Zeit-Motiv im Werk Bernd Alois Zimmermanns“ in: Philosophie und Poesie, Bd. 2. Otto Pöggeler zum 60. Geburtstag, hrsg. v. Annemarie Gethmann-Siefert, Stuttgart-Bad Cannstatt: frommann-holzboog, 1988, 333–349; wieder aufgenommen in Gesammelte Werke, Bd. 2, 1996, 325–342
68. „On the Relation of Art and Philosophy“, in: Facts and Values: philosophical reflections from western and non-western perspectives, edited by M. C. Doeser, J. N. Kraay, Den Haag, Dordrecht: Nijhoff, 1986, 133–139
69. „Arte e verità in Heidegger“, in: Statuto dell’estetica. Atti de „Lo statuto dell’estetica, l’estetica tra filosofia e scienze dell’uomo“: convegno e seminari, Reggio Emilia, 3–6 novembre 1982, Istituto „Antonio Banfi“. Modena: Mucchi, 1986, 245–255
70. „The Presence of Space-Time in the Work of Norbert Kricke“, in: Essays in Memory of Aron Gurwitsch, hrsg. v. Lester Embree, Center for Advanced Research in Phenomenology & University Press of America, Washington, D.C., 1983, 157–168; die dt. Fassung mit dem Titel „Die Raum-Zeit-Thematik im Werk von Norbert Kricke“ wurde im Kunstverein Braunschweig 1984 vorgetragen und aufgenommen in: Jahreshefte der Kunstakademie Düsseldorf, Bd. 4, hrsg. v. Rektorat der Kunstakademie, Düsseldorf, 1994, 87–112 und in Gesammelte Werke, Bd. 2, 1996, 287–315
71. „Erinnerungen an zwei Jahre in Freiburg“, in: Martin Heidegger – Ein Philosoph und die Politik, Freiburger Universitätsblätter, Heft 92, Freiburg i. Br., 1986, 71–73
72. „Reflexionen zu Ingardens Deutung des Bildes“, in: Jagellonian University Reports on Philosophy 10, Polish Scientific Publishers Warsaw-Cracow, 1986, 5–18
73. „Der Beitrag Spaniens zur Kunst des XX. Jahrhunderts“, in: Jahresring 87/88. Jahrbuch für Kunst und Literatur, hrsg. v. A. Henle, H. Bender, E. Trier, V. Neubaus, B. Freiherr von Loeffelholz u. A. Oetker, Stuttgart: Deutsche Verlagsanstalt, 1987, 7–34; wieder aufgenommen in Gesammelte Werke, Bd. 2, 1996, 343–375
74. „Zur Entfaltung von Heideggers Denken – erläutert am Wandel des Begriffs der ‚Existenz‘ in Sein und Zeit und im Brief über den ‚Humanismus‘“, in: Martin Heidegger – Unterwegs im Denken. Symposion im 10. Todesjahr, hrsg. v. Richard Wisser, Freiburg i. Br./München: Alber, 1987, 67–86; wieder aufgenommen in Gesammelte Werke, Bd. 1, 1996, 379–395
75. „Schlußwort zum Eugen Fink Symposion“, Freiburg i. Br., 1985, in: Schriftenreihe der Pädagogischen Hochschule Freiburg, Bd. 2, hrsg. v. Ferdinand Graf, Freiburg i. Br., 1987, 111–115
76. „Maß und Maßlosigkeit der Sterblichen“, in: Sterblichkeitserfahrung und Ethikbegründung. Ein Kolloquium für Werner Marx, hrsg. v. Walter Brüstle und Ludwig Siep, Essen, 1988, 22–37
77. „Jan Pato?ka: Le philosophe en tant que conscience de son peuple“, in: Phénoménologie et Politique: mélanges offerts à Jacques Taminiaux, hrsg. v. Danielle Loris u. Bernard Stevens, [Bruxelles]: Ousia, 1989, 115–136
78. „Zu Heideggers Deutung der Ister-Hymne (Vorlesung SS 1942)“, in: Heidegger-Studies, vol. 3/4, Berlin

=== Commemorative publications ===
- Distanz und Nähe. Reflexionen und Analysen zur Kunst der Gegenwart. Festschrift für Walter Biemel zu seinem 65. Geburtstag. Herausgegeben von Petra Jaeger und Rudolf Lüthe. Königshausen & Neumann, Würzburg 1983. ISBN 3-88479-105-2
- Kunst und Wahrheit. Festschrift für Walter Biemel zu seinem 85. Geburtstag. Herausgegeben von Madalina Diaconu. Humanitas, Bukarest 2003. ISBN 973-50-0423-2
