= François Raffoul =

American philosopher (born 1960)

- Born: 1960 (age 65–66)

Education
- Education: École des Hautes Études en Sciences Sociales (PhD)
- Doctoral advisor: Jacques Derrida

Philosophical work
- Era: 21st-century philosophy
- Region: Western philosophy
- Institutions: Louisiana State University
- Main interests: continental philosophy

François Raffoul (born 1960) is a Franco-American philosopher and professor emeritus of Philosophy at Louisiana State University. He is known for his works on continental thought.

== Books ==
- Thinking the Event. Indiana University Press, 2020
- The Origins of Responsibility. Indiana University Press, 2010
- A chaque fois mien. Paris, France: Galilée, 2004
- Heidegger and the Subject. Amherst, NY: Prometheus Books, 1999
