= John Llewelyn =

Welsh-born British philosopher (1928–2021)

John Llewelyn (1 February 1928 – 7 May 2021) was a Welsh-born British philosopher whose extensive body of work, published over a period of more than forty years, spans the divide between Analytical and Continental schools of contemporary thought. He has conjoined the rigorous approach to matters of meaning and logic typical of the former and the depth and range of reference typical of the latter in a constructive and critical engagement with the work of Jacques Derrida and Emmanuel Levinas.

== Education and career ==
Llewelyn was born in Rogerstone, near Newport, South Wales and educated at Rogerstone Elementary School and Bassaleg Grammar School. After taking a degree in French at University of Wales, Aberystwyth he went on to take an Honours degree in philosophy at the University of Edinburgh and pursue postgraduate studies in philosophy at Oxford. He has held teaching posts at the University of New England, as reader in philosophy at the University of Edinburgh and as visiting professor of philosophy at the University of Memphis and Loyola University Chicago.

== Work ==
A collegiate and enduring friendship with Derrida was established at their first meeting at the 1972 Cerisy-la-Salle décade on Nietzsche, an encounter that would lead to Llewelyn becoming one of the first Anglophone philosophers to engage constructively with Derrida's thought. Llewelyn's 1986 Derrida on the Threshold of Sense contributed to a marked shift in the Anglo-American response to Derrida's work, up until then largely the province of literary and cultural theory.

In 1995 Llewelyn published the first systematic exposition and critical evaluation of the work of Emmanuel Levinas to appear in the English language. The summary of the philosophical doctrines Levinas interrogates, presented in the introduction to that work (1995: 1–4) – Plato, Aristotle, Plotinus, Hobbes, Descartes, Spinoza, Kant, Hegel, Kierkegaard, Nietzsche, Bergson, Husserl, Heidegger– is itself indicative of the depth of scholarship and range of reference Llewelyn marshals throughout his own later work which also has additional important points of reference in the work of Wittgenstein, Saussure, Peirce, J.L. Austin and Duns Scotus and a range of literary figures, notably Emily Dickinson, Wordsworth, Gerard Manley Hopkins and Rilke.

Taking his point of departure from Derrida's last seminars on the animal and moving beyond Levinas's ethics of the Other, Llewelyn has elaborated a "metaphysics of singular responsibility" (1991: 172) which effects a deconstruction of the boundaries between the human and the non-human and, in challenging the anthropocentric bias of Levinas’s ethics, inaugurates a "widening of our conception of the ethical and the political toward the ecological", a "widening of the constituency of the other to whom I owe responsibility" (2012a: 1, 288). In conjunction with this undertaking Llewelyn develops a radicalised and enlarged concept of imagination as the "chief religious faculty", wherein religion is reconceptualised as, per se, the relation to the world as other and as such "is not dependent on, though not incompatible with, institutionalised religion or a certain traditional divinity" (2012b: 314; 2012a, 2009).

== Books authored ==
- 2015. Gerard Manley Hopkins and the Spell of John Duns Scotus, Edinburgh: Edinburgh University Press
- 2012. The Rigor of a Certain Inhumanity: Toward a Wider Suffrage, Bloomington: Indiana University Press
- 2012. Departing from Logic, Returning to Wales, Talybont: Y Lolfa
- 2009. Margins of Religion: Between Kierkegaard and Derrida, Bloomington: Indiana University Press
- 2004. Seeing Through God: A Geophenomenology, Bloomington: Indiana University Press
- 2002. Appositions – of Jacques Derrida and Emmanuel Levinas, Bloomington: Indiana University Press
- 2000. The HypoCritical Imagination: Between Kant and Levinas, London: Routledge
- 1995. Emmanuel Levinas: The Genealogy of Ethics, London: Routledge
- 1991. The Middle Voice of Ecological Conscience: A Chiasmic Reading of Responsibility in the Neighbourhood of Levinas, Heidegger and Others, London: Macmillan
- 1986. Derrida on the Threshold of Sense, London: Macmillan
- 1985. Beyond Metaphysics? The Hermeneutic Circle in Contemporary Continental Philosophy, London: Macmillan

== Selected articles and papers ==
- 2010. "Pursuing Levinas and Ferry toward a Newer and More Democratic Ecological Order," in Peter Atterton and Matthew Calarco, eds, Radicalizing Levinas, Albany: State University of New York Press, 95–111.
- 2009. "Whot or What or Whot?" J. Aaron Simmons and David Wood, eds, A Conversation Between Neighbours: Emmanuel Levinas and Søren Kierkegaard, Bloomington, Indiana University Press, 69–81.
- 2005. "Imagination as a Connecting Middle in Schelling’s Reconstruction of Kant", in George MacDonald Ross, ed., Kant and His Influence, New York, Continuum, 170–201. New ed. of 1990.
- 2003. "Prolegomena to any Future Phenomenological Ecology," in Charles S. Brown and Ted Toadvine, eds. Eco-Phenomenology: Back to the Earth Itself, 51–72.
- 2002. "Levinas and Language," in Simon Critchley and Robert Bernasconi, eds, The Cambridge Companion to Levinas, Cambridge University Press, 119–138
- 2001. "What is Orientation in Thinking. Facing the Facts," in Melvyn New, ed., In Proximity: Emmanuel Levinas and the 18th Century, Texas Tech University Press, 69–90.
- Andrew Benjamin, ed. (1988). "On the Saying that Philosophy begins in thaumazein". Post-Structuralist Classics. London, Routledge. pp. 173–91. ISBN 9781315537597..
- 1988. "The Origin and End of Philosophy", Hugh J. Silverman, ed., Philosophy and Non-Philosophy since Merleau-Ponty, New York, Routledge, 191–210.
- 1987. "A Point of Almost Absolute Proximity to Hegel", John Sallis, ed., Deconstruction and Philosophy: The Texts of Jacques Derrida, Chicago, The University of Chicago Press, 87–95.
- 1982. "Heidegger’s Kant and the Middle Voice", David Wood and Robert Bernasconi, eds, Time and Metaphysics, University of Warwick, Parousia Press, 87–120.

== Articles in Welsh ==
- 2009. "Edmund Husserl," in John Daniel and Walford L. Gealy, eds. Hanes Athroniaeth y Gorllewin (History of Western Philosophy), Cardiff, University of Wales Press, 574–593
- 2005. "Friedrich Nietzsche", Efrydiau Athronyddol (Philosophical Studies), Cardiff, University of Wales Press, 114–138, also in John Daniel and Walford L. Gealy, eds. Hanes Athroniaeth y Gorllewin (History of Western Philosophy)
