= Parting Ways =

Parting Ways or Partin' Ways may refer to:

- Parting Ways (Plymouth, Massachusetts)
- Parting Ways: Jewishness and the Critique of Zionism, a 2012 book by Judith Butler
- "Parting Ways", a song by Pearl Jam from Binaural
- "Partin' Ways", a song by Polo G from Hall of Fame 2.0
