= Subjects of Desire =

1987 book by Judith Butler

Subjects of Desire: Hegelian Reflections in Twentieth-Century France
- Cover of the first edition
- Author: Judith Butler
- Language: English
- Subjects: Hegelianism; French philosophy
- Publisher: Columbia University Press
- Publication date: 1987
- Publication place: United States
- Media type: Print (Hardcover and Paperback)
- Pages: 304 (2012 Columbia University Press edition)
- ISBN: 978-0231159999

Subjects of Desire: Hegelian Reflections in Twentieth-Century France is a 1987 book by the philosopher Judith Butler. Their first published book, it was based on their 1984 Ph.D. dissertation.

== Summary ==
Butler examines the influence of the German philosopher Georg Wilhelm Friedrich Hegel on 20th-century French philosophy. Influenced by Alexandre Kojève, they follow and expand upon his definition of desire as the feeling of an absence or lack. Hegelian desire is in this sense a desire for non-being or death.

While Butler ultimately calls for a rejection of standard Hegelianism, this moving forward itself represents a triumph for Hegel's dialectical method of the negation of difference.

Influenced by psychoanalysis, Butler sees the subject as having to lose identity before becoming itself. The sense of self is lost in desire, as desire is a pull towards an Other. It is a hunger for that which is not present within.

Butler reinterprets Hegel's category of sublation to be the developing sequence of the subject's desire for recognition.

Butler uses Hegel's category of sense-certainty, to question whether the subject can truly ever be aware of its own gendered sexuality. Sexual identity is hence formed in the unconscious. The creation of the "I" of sexual identity is also a radical concealment.

In the battle of recognition between the Master and Slave, the ultimate Lord is death. Hence the triumph of the Master, is not the victory of any subject or man, but of death and desire itself. Death and desire are inherently linked. And all desire is ultimately a wish for that which is not, a wish for suicide. Desire is the impetus towards non-existence. Death is the ultimate fulfillment of all human desires. It is this embrace of death that is true mastery. Slavery is the fear of ceasing to be.

== Reception and influence ==
Butler's interpretation of Hegel-Kojève's master–slave dialectic has been applied by feminist theory to the gender relations between man and woman.

== See also ==
Lack (psychoanalysis)
