= Undoing Gender =

2004 book by Judith Butler

- Author: Judith Butler
- Language: English
- Subject: Gender
- Publisher: Routledge
- Publication date: 2004
- Publication place: United States
- Media type: Print (Hardcover and Paperback)
- Pages: 288
- ISBN: 978-0415969239

Undoing Gender is a 2004 book by American philosopher and gender studies writer Judith Butler.

== Summary ==
Butler examines gender, sex, psychoanalysis, and the way medicine and the law treat intersex and transgender people. Focusing on the case of David Reimer who was born male and reassigned to be raised as a girl after a botched circumcision, Butler reexamines the theory of performativity that they originally explored in Gender Trouble (1990). David—then renamed Brenda—rediscovers his masculinity and goes on to live his life as a male again. While many of Butler's books are intended for a highly academic audience, Undoing Gender reaches out to a much broader readership.

Butler discusses how gender is performed without one being conscious of it, but says that it does not mean this performativity is "automatic or mechanical". They argue that we have desires that do not originate from our personhood, but rather, from social norms. The philosopher also debates our notions of "human" and "less-than-human" and how these culturally imposed ideas can keep one from having a "viable life" as the biggest concerns are usually about whether a person will be accepted if their desires differ from normality. They state that one may feel the need of being recognized in order to live, but that at the same time, the conditions to be recognized make life "unlivable". The writer proposes an interrogation of such conditions so that people who resist them may have more possibilities of living.

== Reception ==
In a review of the book for The Comparatist, Atticus Schoch Zavaletta wrote that Undoing Gender is the first of Butler's works to address transgender and intersex demographics in a prominent manner, and argued that, in doing so, Butler further "push[es] against the boundaries of the field she had a large part in creating." Zavaletta concluded: "Undoing Gender constitutes a thoughtful and provocative response to the new gender politics and elegantly employs psychoanalysis, philosophy, feminism, and queer theory in an effort to pry open the future of the human. Butler carefully attends to contemporary culture, asking questions crucial to LGBTQI studies, ones that are ultimately not only about gays or lesbians but are affirmative of the human and all its possible futures."
