= Judith Butler =

American feminist and queer philosopher (born 1956)

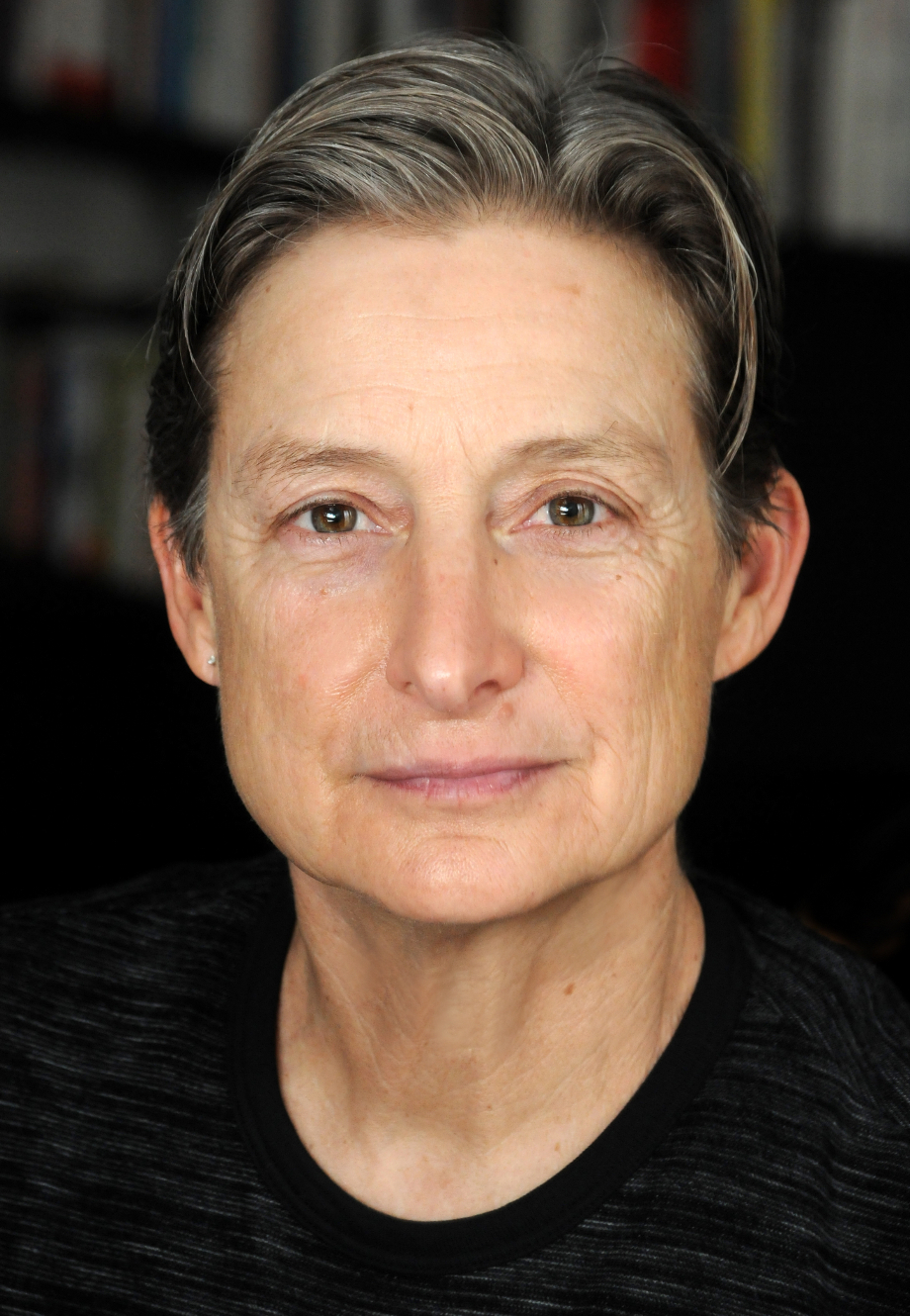
- Butler in 2012
- Born: February 24, 1956 (age 70); Cleveland, Ohio, U.S.
- Partner: Wendy Brown
- Children: 1

Academic background
- Education: Bennington College (attended); Yale University (BA, MA, PhD); Heidelberg University (attended)
- Thesis: Recovery and Invention: The Projects of Desire in Hegel, Kojève, Hyppolite and Sartre (1984)
- Doctoral advisor: Maurice Natanson
- Other advisor: George A. Schrader

Academic work
- Era: Contemporary philosophy
- Region: Western philosophy
- School or tradition: Continental philosophy; third-wave feminism; critical theory; queer theory; performative turn
- Institutions: University of California, Berkeley; European Graduate School
- Main interests: Feminist theory; political philosophy; ethics; psychoanalysis; phenomenology; discourse; embodiment; sexuality; gender studies; Jewish philosophy
- Notable ideas: Gender performativity

Judith Butler (born February 24, 1956) is an American feminist, queer philosopher, and gender studies scholar whose work has influenced political philosophy, ethics, psychoanalysis, and the fields of feminist and queer theory, academic freedom, and literary theory.

Butler has held academic appointments at Wesleyan University, George Washington University, and Johns Hopkins University where they (Note: Butler uses she/her and they/them pronouns but in 2020 said that they prefer the latter. This article uses they/them for consistency.) received tenure in 1992 before joining the faculty in the Department of Rhetoric at the University of California, Berkeley in 1993. There they became the Maxine Elliot Professor in 1998, holding faculty appointments in the Departments of Rhetoric and Comparative Literature and the program in critical theory which they cofounded in 2007. They founded the International Consortium of Critical Theory, funded by the Mellon Foundation, in 2015. They also hold the Hannah Arendt Chair at the European Graduate School (EGS).

Butler is best known for the books Gender Trouble: Feminism and the Subversion of Identity (1990) and Bodies That Matter: On the Discursive Limits of Sex (1993), in which they challenge conventional, heteronormative notions of gender and develop their theory of gender performativity. This theory has had a major influence on feminist and queer scholarship.

Butler has also spoken and written on war, non-violence, ethics, public mourning, democratic theory and other contemporary political questions, including the Palestinian struggles and the limits of Zionism. They have also spoken internationally in support of LGBTQIA rights and against anti-gender ideology.

== Early life and education ==
Judith Butler was born on February 24, 1956, in Cleveland, Ohio, to a family of Hungarian-Jewish and Russian-Jewish descent. Most of their maternal grandmother's family was murdered in the Holocaust. Butler's parents were practicing Reform Jews. Their mother was raised Orthodox, eventually becoming Conservative and then Reform, while their father was raised Reform. As a child and teenager, Butler attended both Hebrew school and special classes on Jewish ethics, where they received their "first training in philosophy". Butler stated in a 2010 interview with Haaretz that they began the ethics classes at the age of 14 as a form of punishment by Butler's Hebrew school's rabbi because they were "too talkative in class" and often accused of clowning. Butler said they were "thrilled" by the idea of these tutorials. When asked what they wanted to study in these special sessions, Butler responded with three questions preoccupying them at the time: "Why was Spinoza excommunicated from the synagogue? Could German Idealism be held accountable for Nazism? And how was one to understand existential theology, including the work of Martin Buber?"

Butler attended Bennington College before transferring to Yale University, where they studied philosophy and received a Bachelor of Arts in 1978 and a PhD in 1984 with the dissertation Recovery and Invention: The Projects of Desire in Hegel, Kojève, Hyppolite and Sartre. Their studies fell primarily under the traditions of German idealism and phenomenology, and they spent one academic year at Heidelberg University as a Fulbright Scholar in 1979. After receiving their PhD, Butler revised their doctoral dissertation to produce their first book, entitled Subjects of Desire: Hegelian Reflections in Twentieth Century France (1987). Butler went on to teach at Wesleyan University, George Washington University, and Johns Hopkins University before joining the faculty of the University of California, Berkeley, in 1993. In 2002, they held the Spinoza Chair of Philosophy at the University of Amsterdam. In addition, they joined the department of English and Comparative Literature at Columbia University as Wun Tsun Tam Mellon Visiting Professor of the Humanities in the spring semesters of 2012, 2013 and 2014 with the option of remaining as full-time faculty.

Butler serves on the editorial or advisory board of several academic journals, including Janus Unbound: Journal of Critical Studies, JAC: A Journal of Rhetoric, Culture, and Politics and Signs: Journal of Women in Culture and Society.

== Overview of major works ==
=== "Performative Acts and Gender Constitution" (1988) ===
In the essay "Performative Acts and Gender Constitution: An Essay in Phenomenology and Feminist Theory", Judith Butler proposes that gender is performative – that is, gender is not so much a static identity or role, but rather comprises a set of acts which can evolve over time. Butler states that because gender identity is established through behavior, there is a possibility to construct different genders via different behaviors.

...if gender is instituted through acts which are internally discontinuous, then the appearance of substance is precisely that, a constructed identity, a performative accomplishment which the mundane social audience, including the actors themselves, come to believe and to perform in the mode of belief. If the ground of gender identity is the stylized repetition of acts through time, and not a seemingly seamless identity, then the possibilities of gender transformation are to be found in the arbitrary relation between such acts, in the possibility of a different sort of repeating, in the breaking or subversive repetition of that style.

Butler concludes their essay with a personal reflection on the strengths and limitations of widespread feminist theories which function on a solely binary perception of gender. Butler critiques what they call the "reification" of sexual difference within a heterosexual framework, and articulates their concern with how this framework affects the accurate presentation (or lack thereof) of "femaleness" across a diverse array of experiences, including those of women.

As a corporeal field of cultural play, gender is a basically innovative affair, although it is quite clear that there are strict punishments for contesting the script by performing out of turn or through unwarranted improvisations. Gender is not passively scripted on the body, and neither is it determined by nature, language, the symbolic, or the overwhelming history of patriarchy. Gender is what is put on, invariably, under constraint, daily and incessantly, with anxiety and pleasure, but if this continuous act is mistaken for a natural or linguistic given, power is relinquished to expand the cultural field bodily through subversive performances of various kinds.

Throughout this text, Butler derives influence from French philosophers such as Simone de Beauvoir and Maurice Merleau-Ponty, particularly de Beauvoir's The Second Sex and Merleau-Ponty's "The Body in its Sexual Being". Butler also cites works by Gayle Rubin, Mary Anne Warren, and their own piece "Sex and Gender in Simone de Beauvoir's Second Sex" (1986), among others.

=== Gender Trouble (1990) ===
Gender Trouble: Feminism and the Subversion of Identity was first published in 1990, selling over 100,000 copies internationally, in multiple languages. Similar to "Performative Acts and Gender Constitution", Gender Trouble discusses the works of Sigmund Freud, Simone de Beauvoir, Julia Kristeva, Jacques Lacan, Luce Irigaray, Monique Wittig, Jacques Derrida, and Michel Foucault.

Butler offers a critique of the terms 'gender' and 'sex' as they have been used by feminists. Butler argues that feminism made a mistake in trying to make "women" a discrete, ahistorical group with common characteristics. Butler writes that this approach reinforces the binary view of gender relations. Butler believes that feminists should not try to define "women" and they also believe that feminists should "focus on providing an account of how power functions and shapes our understandings of womanhood not only in the society at large but also within the feminist movement". Finally, Butler aims to break the supposed links between sex and gender so that gender and desire can be "flexible, free floating and not caused by other stable factors" (David Gauntlett). The idea of identity as free and flexible and gender as performative, not an essence, has become one of the foundations of queer theory.

=== Imitation and Gender Insubordination (1991) ===
Inside/Out: Lesbian Theories, Gay Theories is a collection of writings of gay and lesbian social theorists. Butler's contribution argues that no transparent revelation is afforded by using the terms "gay" or "lesbian" yet there is a political imperative to do so.

Butler employs the concepts of play/performance, drag, and imitation to describe the formation of gender and sexuality as continually created subjectivities always at risk of dissolution from non-performance.

=== Bodies That Matter (1993) ===
Bodies That Matter: On the Discursive Limits of Sex seeks to clear up readings and supposed misinterpretations of performativity that view the enactment of sex/gender as a daily choice. As such, Butler aims to answer questions of this vein that may have been raised from their previous work Gender Trouble. Butler emphasizes the role of repetition in performativity, making use of Derrida's theory of iterability, which is a form of citationality:

Performativity cannot be understood outside of a process of iterability, a regularized and constrained repetition of norms. And this repetition is not performed by a subject; this repetition is what enables a subject and constitutes the temporal condition for the subject. This iterability implies that 'performance' is not a singular 'act' or event, but a ritualized production, a ritual reiterated under and through constraint, under and through the force of prohibition and taboo, with the threat of ostracism and even death controlling and compelling the shape of the production, but not, I will insist, determining it fully in advance.

Butler also explores how gender can be understood not only as a performance, but also as a "constitutive constraint", or constructed character. They ask how this conceptualization of an individual's gender contributes to notions of bodily intelligibility, or comprehension, by other individuals. Butler continues to discuss bodily intelligibility by means of sex as a "materialized" entity, upon which cultural, collective ideals of gender can be built. From this angle, Butler interrogates value conscription upon various bodies as determined theories and practices of heterosexual predominance.

If gender consists of the social meanings that sex assumes, then sex does not accrue social meanings as additive properties but, rather, is replaced by the social meanings it takes on; sex is relinquished in the course of that assumption, and gender emerges, not as a term in a continued relationship of opposition to sex, but as the term which absorbs and displaces "sex," the mark of its full substantiation into gender or what, from a materialist point of view, might constitute a full de-substantiation.

While continuing to draw upon sources such as those of Plato, Irigaray, Lacan, and Freud (as they did for Gender Trouble), Butler also draws upon pieces of documentary film and literature for Bodies That Matter. Such pieces include the film Paris is Burning, short stories by Willa Cather, and the novel Passing by Nella Larsen.

=== Excitable Speech (1997) ===
In Excitable Speech: A Politics of the Performative, Butler surveys the problems of hate speech and censorship. They argue that censorship is difficult to evaluate, and that in some cases it may be useful or even necessary, while in others it may be worse than tolerance.

Butler argues that hate speech exists retrospectively, only after being declared such by state authorities. In this way, the state reserves for itself the power to define hate speech and, conversely, the limits of acceptable discourse. In this connection, Butler criticizes feminist legal scholar Catharine MacKinnon's argument against pornography for its unquestioning acceptance of the state's power to censor.

Deploying Foucault's argument from the first volume of The History of Sexuality, Butler states that any attempt at censorship, legal or otherwise, necessarily propagates the very language it seeks to forbid. As Foucault argues, for example, the strict sexual mores of 19th-century Western Europe did nothing but amplify the discourse of sexuality they sought to control. Extending this argument using Derrida and Lacan, Butler says that censorship is primitive to language, and that the linguistic "I" is a mere effect of a primitive censorship. In this way, Butler questions the possibility of any genuinely oppositional discourse; "If speech depends upon censorship, then the principle that one might seek to oppose is at once the formative principle of oppositional speech".

=== Precarious Life (2004) ===
Precarious Life: The Powers of Mourning and Violence opens a new line in Judith Butler's work that has had a great impact on their subsequent thought, especially on books like Frames of War: When Is Life Grievable? (2009) or Notes Toward a Performative Theory of Assembly (2015), as well as on other contemporary thinkers. In this book, Butler deals with issues of precarity, vulnerability, grief and contemporary political violence in the face of the war on terror and the realities of prisoners at Guantanamo Bay and similar detention centers. Drawing on Foucault, they characterize the form of power at work in these places of "indefinite detention" as a convergence of sovereignty and governmentality. The "state of exception" deployed here is in fact more complex than the one pointed out by Agamben in his Homo Sacer, since the government is in a more ambiguous relation to law —it may comply with it or suspend it, depending on its interests, and this is itself a tool of the state to produce its own sovereignty. Butler also points towards problems in international law treatises like the Geneva Conventions. In practice, these only protect people who belong to (or act in the name of) a recognized state, and therefore are helpless in situations of abuse toward stateless people, people who do not enjoy a recognized citizenship or people who are labelled "terrorists", and therefore understood as acting on their own behalf as irrational "killing machines" that need to be held captive due to their "dangerousness".

Butler also writes here on vulnerability and precariousness as intrinsic to the human condition. This is due to our inevitable interdependency from other precarious subjects, who are never really "complete" or autonomous but instead always "dispossessed" on the Other. This is manifested in shared experiences like grief and loss, that can form the basis for a recognition of our shared human (vulnerable) condition. However, not every loss can be mourned in the same way, and in fact not every life can be conceived of as such (as situated in a condition common to ours). Through a critical engagement with Levinas, they will explore how certain representations prevent lives from being considered worthy of being lived or taken into account, precluding the mourning of certain Others, and with that the recognition of them and their losses as equally human. This preoccupation with the dignifying or dehumanizing role of practices of framing and representations will constitute one of the central elements of Frames of War (2009).

=== Undoing Gender (2004) ===
Undoing Gender collects Butler's reflections on gender, sex, sexuality, psychoanalysis and the medical treatment of intersex people for a more general readership than many of their other books. Butler revisits and refines their notion of performativity and focuses on the question of undoing "restrictively normative conceptions of sexual and gendered life".

Butler discusses how gender is performed without one being conscious of it, but says that it does not mean this performativity is "automatic or mechanical". They argue that we have desires that do not originate from our personhood, but rather, from social norms. The writer also debates our notions of "human" and "less-than-human" and how these culturally imposed ideas can keep one from having a "viable life" as the biggest concerns are usually about whether a person will be accepted if their desires differ from normality. Butler states that one may feel the need of being recognized in order to live, but that at the same time, the conditions to be recognized make life "unlivable". The writer proposes an interrogation of such conditions so that people who resist them may have more possibilities of living.

In Butler's discussion of intersex issues and people, Butler addresses the case of David Reimer, a person whose sex was medically reassigned from male to female after a botched circumcision at eight months of age. Reimer was "made" female by doctors, but later in life identified as "really" male, married and became a stepfather to his wife's three children, and went on to tell his story in As Nature Made Him: The Boy Who Was Raised as a Girl, which he wrote with John Colapinto. Reimer died by suicide in 2004.

=== Giving an Account of Oneself (2005) ===
In Giving an Account of Oneself, Butler develops an ethics based on the opacity of the subject to itself; in other words, the limits of self-knowledge. Primarily borrowing from Theodor Adorno, Michel Foucault, Friedrich Nietzsche, Jean Laplanche, Adriana Cavarero and Emmanuel Levinas, Butler develops a theory of the formation of the subject. Butler theorizes the subject in relation to the social – a community of others and their norms – which is beyond the control of the subject it forms, as precisely the very condition of that subject's formation, the resources by which the subject becomes recognizably human, a grammatical "I", in the first place.

Butler accepts the claim that if the subject is opaque to itself the limitations of its free ethical responsibility and obligations are due to the limits of narrative, presuppositions of language and projection.

You may think that I am in fact telling a story about the prehistory of the subject, one that I have been arguing cannot be told. There are two responses to this objection. (1) That there is no final or adequate narrative reconstruction of the prehistory of the speaking "I" does not mean we cannot narrate it; it only means that at the moment when we narrate we become speculative philosophers or fiction writers. (2) This prehistory has never stopped happening and, as such, is not a prehistory in any chronological sense. It is not done with, over, relegated to a past, which then becomes part of a causal or narrative reconstruction of the self. On the contrary, that prehistory interrupts the story I have to give of myself, makes every account of myself partial and failed, and constitutes, in a way, my failure to be fully accountable for my actions, my final "irresponsibility," one for which I may be forgiven only because I could not do otherwise. This not being able to do otherwise is our common predicament (page 78).

Instead Butler argues for an ethics based precisely on the limits of self-knowledge as the limits of responsibility itself. Any concept of responsibility which demands the full transparency of the self to itself, an entirely accountable self, necessarily does violence to the opacity which marks the constitution of the self it addresses. The scene of address by which responsibility is enabled is always already a relation between subjects who are variably opaque to themselves and to each other. The ethics that Butler envisions is therefore one in which the responsible self knows the limits of its knowing, recognizes the limits of its capacity to give an account of itself to others, and respects those limits as symptomatically human. To take seriously one's opacity to oneself in ethical deliberation means then to critically interrogate the social world in which one comes to be human in the first place and which remains precisely that which one cannot know about oneself. In this way, Butler locates social and political critique at the core of ethical practice.

=== Notes Toward a Performative Theory of Assembly (2015) ===
In Notes Toward a Performative Theory of Assembly, Butler discusses the power of public gatherings, considering what they signify and how they work. They use this framework to analyze the power and possibilities of protests, such as the Black Lives Matter protests regarding the deaths of Michael Brown and Eric Garner in 2014.

=== The Force of Nonviolence (2020) ===
In The Force of Nonviolence: An Ethico-Political Bind, Butler connects the ideologies of nonviolence and the political struggle for social equality. They review the traditional understanding of "nonviolence", stating that it "is often misunderstood as a passive practice that emanates from a calm region of the soul, or as an individualist ethical relation to existing forms of power". Instead of this understanding, Butler argues that "nonviolence is an ethical position found in the midst of the political field".

=== Who's Afraid of Gender? (2024) ===
In Who's Afraid of Gender?, Butler explores the roots of current anti-trans rhetoric, which they define as a "phantasm" that aligns itself with emerging authoritarian movements. Butler was inspired to write this book after being attacked in 2017 in Brazil while speaking, at least one of whom shouted at Butler, saying "Take your ideology to hell!" Butler is interested in the literal demonization of gender by analyzing the historical context of the anti-gender movement. The book has been described as "the most accessible of their books so far, an intervention meant for a wide audience".

== Reception ==
Butler's work has been influential in feminist and queer theory, cultural studies, and continental philosophy. Their contribution to a range of other disciplines, such as psychoanalysis, (Note: Butler calls themselves a "creature of psychoanalysis". "It's where I learned how to read. I was given permission to live and to love, which is what I do in my work. It was a wise and generous gift, which allowed me to move forward with my life.") literary, film, and performance studies as well as visual arts, has also been significant. Their theory of gender performativity as well as their conception of "critically queer" have heavily influenced understandings of gender and queer identity in the academic world, and have shaped and mobilized various kinds of political activism, particularly queer activism, internationally. Butler's work has also entered into contemporary debates on the teaching of gender, gay parenting, and the depathologization of transgender people.

Some academics and political activists see in Butler a departure from the sex/gender dichotomy and a non-essentialist conception of gender—along with an insistence that power helps form the subject—an idea whose introduction purportedly brought new insights to feminist and queer praxis, thought, and studies. Darin Barney of McGill University wrote that:

Butler's work on gender, sex, sexuality, queerness, feminism, bodies, political speech and ethics has changed the way scholars all over the world think, talk and write about identity, subjectivity, power and politics. It has also changed the lives of countless people whose bodies, genders, sexualities and desires have made them subject to violence, exclusion and oppression.

Postmodern feminism's major departure from other branches of feminism is perhaps the argument that sex is itself constructed through language, a view notably propounded in Butler's 1990 book, Gender Trouble. Butler's work has been criticised by modernist and anti-relativist critics of postmodernism who deplore the idea that categories spoken about in the natural sciences (e.g., sex) are socially constructed.

In 1998, Denis Dutton's journal Philosophy and Literature awarded Butler first prize in its fourth annual "Bad Writing Competition", which set out to "celebrate bad writing from the most stylistically lamentable passages found in scholarly books and articles", which Butler responded to. (Note: Butler's cited entry in a 1997 issue of the scholarly journal Diacritics ran thus: The move from a structuralist account in which capital is understood to structure social relations in relatively homologous ways to a view of hegemony in which power relations are subject to repetition, convergence, and rearticulation brought the question of temporality into the thinking of structure, and marked a shift from a form of Althusserian theory that takes structural totalities as theoretical objects to one in which the insights into the contingent possibility of structure inaugurate a renewed conception of hegemony as bound up with the contingent sites and strategies of the rearticulation of power.)

Some critics have accused Butler of elitism due to their difficult prose style, while others state that Butler reduces gender to "discourse" or promotes a form of gender voluntarism – Doctrine prioritizing will over intellect. Susan Bordo, for example, has argued that Butler reduces gender to language and has contended that the body is a major part of gender, in opposition to Butler's conception of gender as performative. A particularly vocal critic has been feminist Martha Nussbaum, who has argued that Butler misreads J. L. Austin's idea of performative utterance, makes erroneous legal claims, forecloses an essential site of resistance by repudiating pre-cultural agency, and provides no "normative theory of social justice and human dignity". Finally, Nancy Fraser's critique of Butler was part of a famous exchange between the two theorists. Fraser has suggested that Butler's focus on performativity distances them from "everyday ways of talking and thinking about ourselves. ... Why should we use such a self-distancing idiom?" Butler responded to criticisms in the preface to the 1999-edition Gender Trouble by asking suggestively whether there is "a value to be derived from...experiences of linguistic difficulty".

More recently, several critics — such as semiotician Viviane Namaste — have criticised Judith Butler's Undoing Gender for under-emphasizing the intersectional aspects of gender-based violence. For example, Timothy Laurie notes that Butler's use of phrases like "gender politics" and "gender violence" in relation to assaults on transgender individuals in the United States can "[scour] a landscape filled with class and labour relations, racialized urban stratification, and complex interactions between sexual identity, sexual practices and sex work", and produce instead "a clean surface on which struggles over 'the human' are imagined to play out".

EGS philosophy professor Geoffrey Bennington, translator for many of Derrida's books, criticised Butler's introduction to the 1997 translation of Derrida's 1967 Of Grammatology. (Note: He criticised it for "vagueness, inaccuracies, misunderstandings, and plain errors", such as an "extraordinarily inaccurate account of Saussure's notion of the sign", doing Derrida and original preface-writer Gayatri Chakravorty Spivak "a real disservice".)

=== Non-academic ===
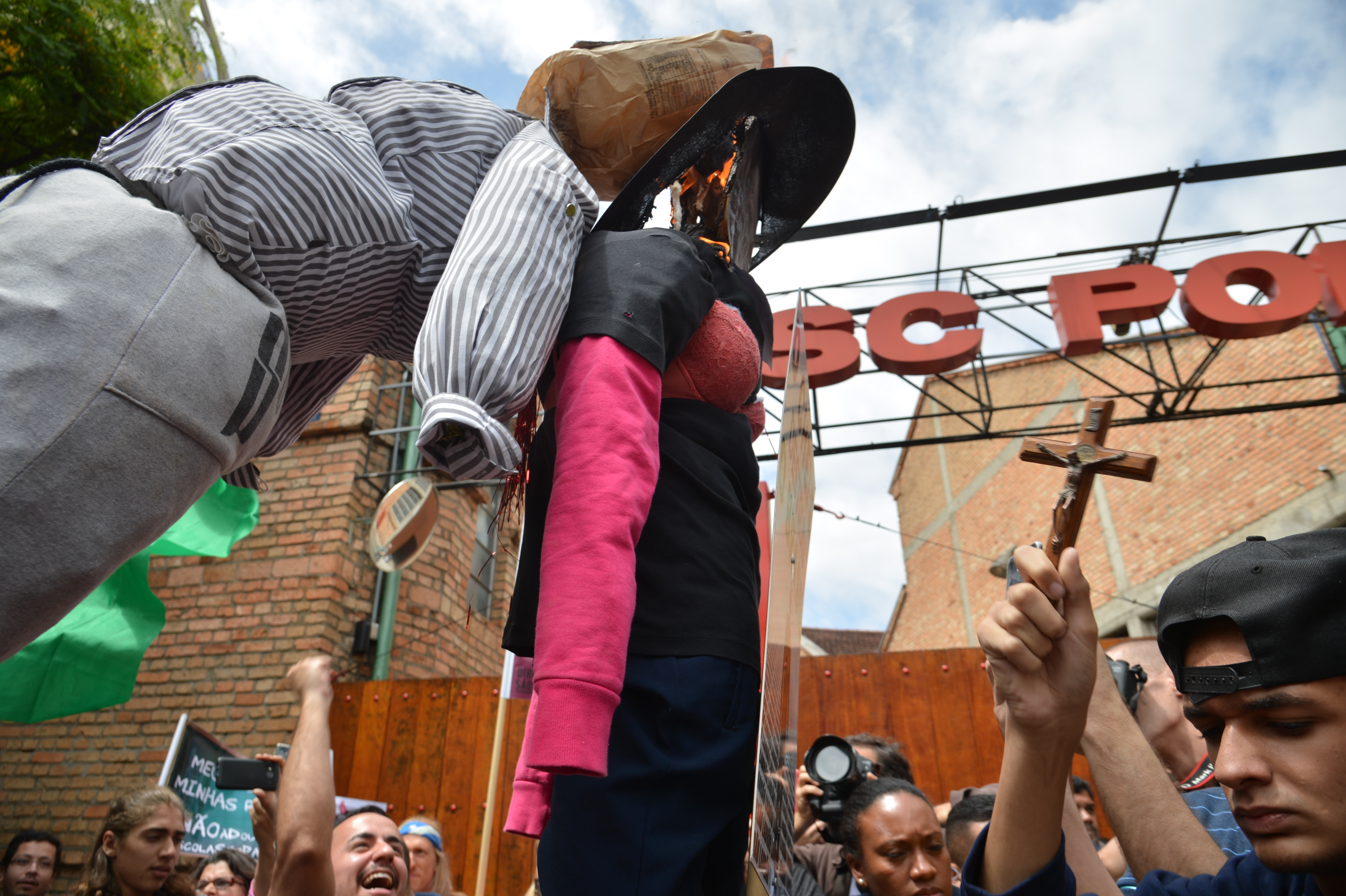
São Paulo, Brazil. An Inside Higher Ed article notes that before a democracy conference in Brazil "Butler was burned in effigy as police kept groups of protesters – for and against Butler – apart. A pink bra was attached to the figure that was burned". Some protesters "held crosses and Brazilian flags in the air".

Before a 2017 democracy conference in Brazil, Butler was burnt in effigy.

Bruno Perreau has written that Butler was literally depicted as an "antichrist", both because of their gender and their Jewish identity, the fear of minority politics and critical studies being expressed through fantasies of a corrupted body.

== Political activism ==
Much of Butler's early political activism centered around queer and feminist issues, and they served, for a period of time, as the chair of the board of the International Gay and Lesbian Human Rights Commission. Over the years, Butler has been particularly active in the gay and lesbian rights, feminist, and anti-war movements. They have also written and spoken out on issues ranging from affirmative action and gay marriage to the wars in Iraq and Afghanistan and the prisoners detained at Guantanamo Bay. More recently, Butler has been active in the Occupy movement and has publicly expressed support for a version of the 2005 Boycott, Divestment and Sanctions (BDS) campaign against Israel.

They emphasize that Israel as a state does not, and should not, be taken to represent all Jews or Jewish opinions. Butler is an outspoken critic of many aspects of contemporary Israel's actions and has criticized some forms of Zionism. Butler has been variously identified as post-Zionist and anti-Zionist but is reluctant to embrace such labels, saying in 2013, "I prefer to [provide] a story rather than a category. I come from a strong zionist community in the [United States], and became critical of zionism starting in my early twenties.... I am now working for what can only be called a post-zionist vision at this point in history. Perhaps at another point in history, I would be called a zionist, or even call myself that."

Butler argues that, though antisemitism has been rising, there is a danger that Jews are seen as "presumptive victims", leading to widespread misuse of accusations of antisemitism, which may in fact trivialize the accusation's gravity and weight.

On September 7, 2006, Butler participated in a faculty-organized teach-in against the 2006 Lebanon War at the University of California, Berkeley. Another widely publicized moment occurred in June 2010, when Butler refused the Civil Courage Award (Zivilcouragepreis) of the Christopher Street Day (CSD) Parade in Berlin, Germany, at the award ceremony. They cited racist comments on the part of organizers and a general failure of CSD organizations to distance themselves from racism in general and from anti-Muslim excuses for war more specifically. Criticizing the event's commercialism, Butler went on to name several groups that they commended as stronger opponents of "homophobia, transphobia, sexism, racism, and militarism".

In October 2011, Butler attended Occupy Wall Street and, in reference to calls for clarification of the protesters' demands, they said:

People have asked, so what are the demands? What are the demands all of these people are making? Either they say there are no demands and that leaves your critics confused, or they say that the demands for social equality and economic justice are impossible demands. And the impossible demands, they say, are just not practical. If hope is an impossible demand, then we demand the impossible – that the right to shelter, food and employment are impossible demands, then we demand the impossible. If it is impossible to demand that those who profit from the recession redistribute their wealth and cease their greed, then yes, we demand the impossible.

Butler was an executive member of Faculty for Israeli-Palestinian Peace – Educational Network for Human Rights in Israel/Palestine. They are a long standing member of the Academic Council of Jewish Voice for Peace. In regards to the U.S. presidential campaign in 2016, they criticized Hillary Clinton's "limited" feminism and "hawkish" foreign policy, but indicated they would vote for the Democratic nominee, calling the Republican candidate Donald Trump a "danger to democracy as we know it."

=== Adorno Prize affair ===
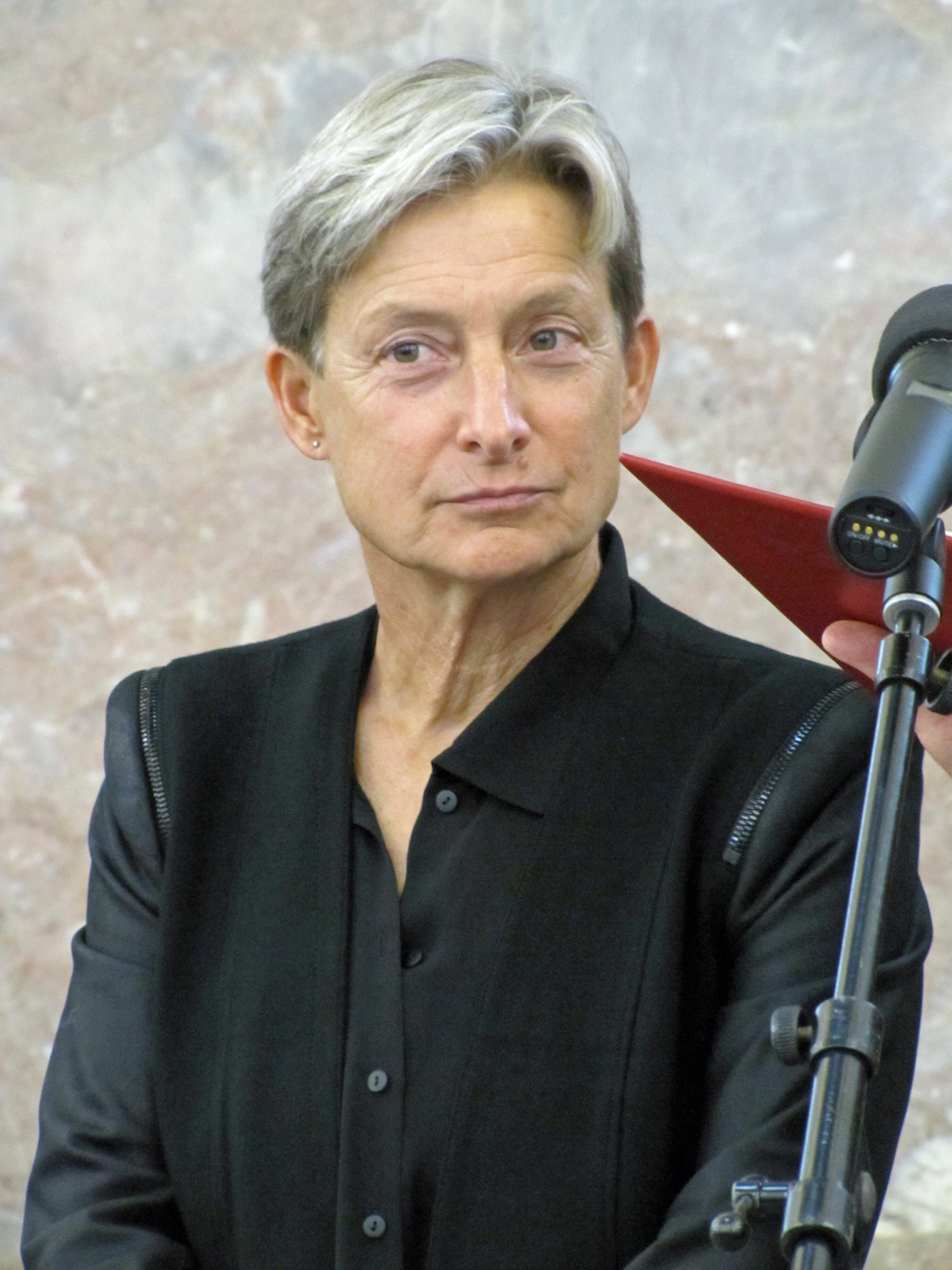
Butler receives the Theodor W. Adorno Award in 2012.

When Butler received the 2012 Theodor W. Adorno Award, which recognizes outstanding contributions in philosophy, theater, music, and film, the prize committee faced public criticism. Israel's ambassador to Germany, Yacov Hadas-Handelsman; Efraim Zuroff, director of the Simon Wiesenthal Center's Jerusalem office; and the Central Council of Jews in Germany objected to Butler's selection, citing Butler's public statements on Israel, including their support for a boycott.

Butler responded that they did not take these criticisms personally, arguing instead that such objections were aimed more broadly at individuals who criticize Israel and its current policies. In a letter published on the Mondoweiss website, Butler wrote that their ethical positions were grounded in Jewish philosophical traditions and stated that it is "blatantly untrue, absurd, and painful" to claim that criticism of the State of Israel is inherently antisemitic or, when expressed by Jews, a form of self-hatred.

=== Comments on Hamas, Hezbollah and the Gaza war ===
Butler has been criticized for statements they have made about Hamas and Hezbollah. In 2006, Butler described the militant Islamist groups as "social movements that are progressive, that are on the Left, that are part of a global Left". They were accused of defending "Hezbollah and Hamas as progressive organizations" and supporting their tactics.

Butler responded to these criticisms by stating that their remarks on Hamas and Hezbollah were taken completely out of context and, in so doing, Butler's established views on non-violence were contradicted and misrepresented. Butler describes the origin of their remarks on Hamas and Hezbollah in the following way:

I was asked by a member of an academic audience a few years ago whether I thought Hamas and Hezbollah belonged to "the global left" and I replied with two points. My first point was merely descriptive: those political organizations define themselves as anti-imperialist, and anti-imperialism is one characteristic of the global left, so on that basis one could describe them as part of the global left. My second point was then critical: as with any group on the left, one has to decide whether one is for that group or against that group, and one needs to critically evaluate their stand.

After the start of the Gaza war in 2023, Butler published an essay entitled "The Compass of Mourning" in which they "condemn without qualification" the "terrifying and revolting massacre" while at the same time arguing that the attacks by Hamas should be seen in the context of the "horrors of the last seventy years". The article was criticized several times in German newspapers. Christian Geyer-Hindemith wrote in the Frankfurter Allgemeine Zeitung that Butler "makes individual atrocities disappear" through contextualization. Thomas E. Schmidt spoke in the Die Zeit about the "reversal of guilt". At the same time, Anna Mayr wrote in the Die Zeit that "countless the same thing goes on for paragraphs: Nothing can justify the violence, and you still have to see the violence of the occupying power, Israel. It becomes clear that [they] (understandably) doesn't know where to think next." Writing for Haaretz, Chaim Levinson rejected Butler's framing of the matter within a context of colonialism, saying that term is "the emptiest word in Western intellectual discourse today".

Speaking at a public event in Paris on March 3, 2024, Butler stated that the October 7 attacks was an uprising, an instance of armed resistance, rather than an act of terrorism.

I think it is more honest and historically correct to say that the uprising of October 7 was an act of armed resistance. It is not a terrorist attack and it is not an antisemitic attack. It was an attack against Israelis.

On September 4, 2025, the University of California, Berkeley, where Butler is a professor, informed 160 members of the campus community that their names and files had been provided to the US Department of Education in response to an investigation into alleged incidents of antisemitism. In an editorial for The Chronicle of Higher Education on September 13, Butler announced that their name had been included and condemned the university for capitulating and acting as an "informant". When interviewed by Democracy Now, Butler noted that they had received no details on what the specific allegations were, and that the university had failed to follow its own internal protocols in the matter. Butler, who is of Jewish heritage and who lost family members in the Holocaust, was the most culturally prominent member of the list. Joel Swanson, professor of Jewish Studies, argued that the Department of Education's investigation was politically motivated, and that "the Trump administration is publicly making an example out of arguably the most famous Jewish public intellectual in the country today." A number of politicians, professors, and other groups spoke out on the topic in the weeks following the announcement.

=== Comments on Black Lives Matter ===
In a January 2015 interview with George Yancy of The New York Times, Butler discussed the Black Lives Matter movement. They said:

What is implied by this statement [Black Lives Matter], a statement that should be obviously true, but apparently is not? If black lives do not matter, then they are not really regarded as lives, since a life is supposed to matter. So what we see is that some lives matter more than others, that some lives matter so much that they need to be protected at all costs, and that other lives matter less, or not at all. And when that becomes the situation, then the lives that do not matter so much, or do not matter at all, can be killed or lost, can be exposed to conditions of destitution, and there is no concern, or even worse, that is regarded as the way it is supposed to be...When people engage in concerted actions across racial lines to build communities based on equality, to defend the rights of those who are disproportionately imperiled to have a chance to live without the fear of dying quite suddenly at the hands of the police. There are many ways to do this, in the street, the office, the home, and in the media. Only through such an ever-growing cross-racial struggle against racism can we begin to achieve a sense of all the lives that really do matter.

The dialogue draws heavily on their 2004 book Precarious Life: The Powers of Mourning and Violence.

=== Avital Ronell sexual harassment case ===
On May 11, 2018, Butler joined a group of scholars in writing a letter to New York University following the sexual harassment suit filed by a former NYU graduate student against his advisor Avital Ronell. The signatories acknowledged not having had access to the confidential findings of the investigation that followed the Title IX complaint against Ronell. Nonetheless, they accused the complainant of waging a "malicious campaign" against Ronell. The signatories also wrote that the presumed "malicious intention has animated and sustained this legal nightmare" for a highly regarded scholar. "If she were to be terminated or relieved of her duties, the injustice would be widely recognized and opposed." Butler, one of the signatories, invoked their title as President Elect of the Modern Language Association. Some three months later, Butler apologized to the MLA for the letter. "I acknowledged that I should not have allowed the MLA affiliation to go forward with my name", Butler wrote to the Chronicle of Higher Education. "I expressed regret to the MLA officers and staff, and my colleagues accepted my apology. I extend that same apology to MLA members."

=== Comments on the anti-gender movement and trans-exclusionary radical feminism ===
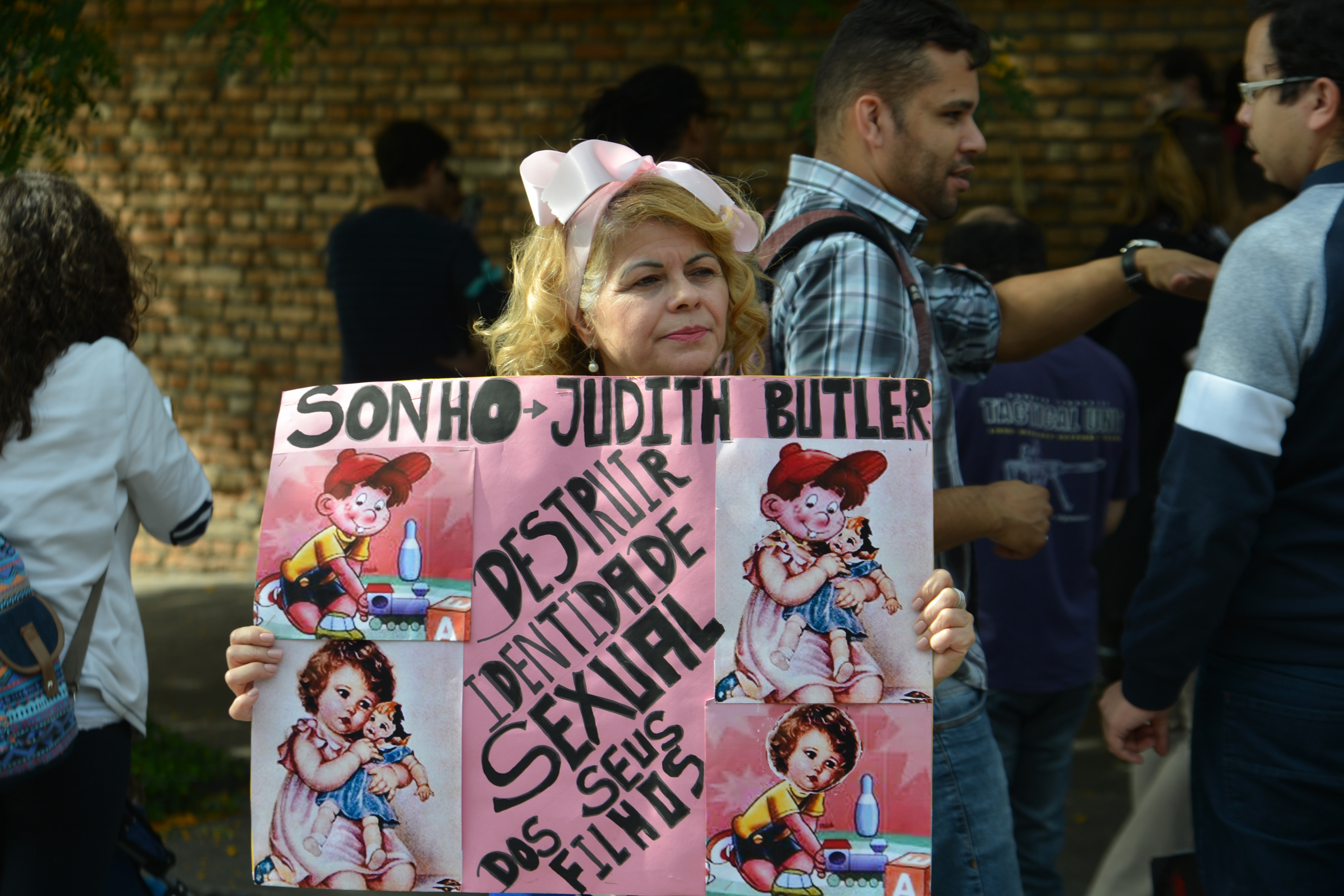
Sign at São Paulo with the alleged "sonho" (dream) of Judith Butler: "destruir identidade sexual dos seus filhos", which can be loosely translated as "[Butler's dream is to] destroy sexual identity of your children"

Butler said in 2020 that trans-exclusionary radical feminism (TERF) is "a fringe movement that is seeking to speak in the name of the mainstream, and that our responsibility is to refuse to let that happen". In 2021, drawing from Umberto Eco who understood "fascism" as "a beehive of contradictions", (Note: Butler notes a 'contradiction':... chromosomal and endocrinological differences complicate the binarism [sic] of sex ... [Nevertheless,] [t]he anti-gender advocates claim that "gender ideologists" deny the material differences between men and women, but their [the anti-gender advocates'] materialism quickly devolves ... .) they noted that the term 'fascism' "describes" the "anti-gender ideology". They cautioned self-declared feminists from allying with anti-gender movements in targeting trans, non-binary, and genderqueer people. Butler also explored the issue in a 2019 paper in which they argued that "the confusion of discourses is part of what constitutes the fascist structure and appeal of at least some of these [anti-gender] movements. One can oppose gender as a cultural import from the North at the same time that one can see that very opposition as a social movement against further colonization of the South. The result is not a turn to the Left, but an embrace of ethno-nationalism." In 2023 Butler said, "the anti-gender ideology movement should be considered a neo-fascist phenomenon."

==== The Guardian interview ====
On September 7, 2021, The Guardian published an interview with Butler by Jules Gleeson that included Butler's view of trans-exclusionary feminists (TERFs). In response to a question about the Wi Spa controversy, the Press Gazette stated that Butler, in the Guardian article, said: "The anti-gender ideology is one of the dominant strains of fascism in our times." Within a few hours of publication, three paragraphs including this statement were removed, with a note explaining: "This article was edited on 7 September 2021 to reflect developments which occurred after the interview took place."

The Guardian was then accused of censoring Butler for having compared TERFs to fascists. British writer Roz Kaveney called it "a truly shocking moment of bigoted dishonesty", while British transgender activist and writer Juno Dawson, among others, observed that The Guardian had inadvertently triggered the Streisand effect—an attempt to censor yields the unintended consequence of increasing awareness of a topic. The next day, The Guardian acknowledged "a failure in our editorial standards".

== Personal life ==
Butler is a lesbian, legally non-binary in the State of California, and, as of 2020, said they use both singular 'they/them' and 'she/her' pronouns but prefer to use singular 'they/them' pronouns. Butler indicated that they were "never at home" with being assigned female at birth.

They live in Berkeley with their partner Wendy Brown and son.

== Selected honors and awards ==
- 2025: American Council of Learned Societies, Distinguished Lifetime Achievement Award
- 2025: Grain of Sand Award, American Political Science Association, Interpretive Methodologies Section
- 2022: Gold Medal of the Círculo de Bellas Artes, Madrid
- 2022: 33rd Catalonia International Prize, Barcelona
- 2020: Gold Medal of Honorary Patronage, Dublin University Philosophical Society
- 2019: Elected as Fellow to the American Academy of Arts and Sciences.
- 2018: Butler delivered the Gifford Lectures with their series entitled 'My Life, Your Life: Equality and the Philosophy of Non-Violence'
- 2018: Lifelong Fellow, St. Johns College, Cambridge University
- 2015-2024: Recipient of Andrew Mellon grants for the International Consortium of Critical Theory Programs and Distinguished Accomplishment in the Humanities
- 2015: Elected as a Corresponding Fellow of the British Academy
- 2014: Named one of PinkNews's top 11 Jewish gay and lesbian icons
- 2013: Officier, Ordre des Arts et des Lettres, French Cultural Ministry
- 2012: Theodor W. Adorno Award
- 2010: "25 Visionaries Who Are Changing Your World", Utne Reader
- 2009: Forbes magazine, Princeton President List of Seven Most Powerful Thinkers
- 2008: Mellon Award for their exemplary contributions to scholarship in the humanities
- 2007: Elected to the American Philosophical Society
- 2001: David R Kessler Award for LGBTQ Studies, CLAGS: The Center for LGBTQ Studies
- 1999: Guggenheim Fellowship

== Honorary degrees ==
- 2026: Universitat Autònoma de Barcelona
- 2025: University of Cyprus
- 2023: Università degli Studi di Bari Aldo Moro, Italy
- 2022 Universidad Nacional Autónoma de México (UNAM)
- 2021: Honorary Fellow, University of London, Birkbeck
- 2020: Royal College of Art, London
- 2019: Universidad de Chile
- 2019: University of Belgrade
- 2018: Universidad de San Carlos de Guatemala
- 2015: Universidad de Buenos Aires
- 2015: Université de Liège, Belgium
- 2015: University of Costa Rica
- 2014: University of Fribourg, Switzerland
- 2013: University of St. Andrews
- 2013: McGill University
- 2011: Université de Paris VII
- 2011: Université de Bordeaux III
- 2008: Grinnell College

== Publications ==
Butler's books have been translated into numerous languages; Gender Trouble has been translated into twenty-seven languages. They have co-authored and edited over a dozen volumes, including Dispossession: The Performative in the Political (2013), coauthored with Athena Athanasiou. Over the years Butler has also published many influential essays, interviews, and public presentations. Butler is considered by many to be "one of the most influential voices in contemporary political theory", and the most widely read and influential gender studies academic in the world.

The following is a partial list of Butler's publications.

=== Books ===
- Butler, Judith (1999) [1987]. Subjects of Desire: Hegelian Reflections in Twentieth-Century France. New York: Columbia University Press. ISBN 978-0-231-15998-2. [Their doctoral dissertation.]
- — (2006) [1990]. Gender Trouble: Feminism and the Subversion of Identity. New York: Routledge. ISBN 978-0-415-38955-6.
- — (1993). Bodies That Matter: On the Discursive Limits of "Sex". New York: Routledge. ISBN 978-0-415-90365-3.
- with Benhabib, Seyla; Fraser, Nancy; Cornell, Drucilla (1995). Feminist Contentions: A Philosophical Exchange. New York: Routledge. ISBN 978-0-415-91086-6.
- — (1997). Excitable speech: a politics of the performative. New York: Routledge. ISBN 978-0-415-91587-8.
- — (1997). The Psychic Life of Power: Theories in Subjection. Stanford, California: Stanford University Press. ISBN 978-0-8047-2812-6.
- — (2000). Antigone's Claim: Kinship Between Life and Death. New York: Columbia University Press. ISBN 978-0-231-51804-8.
- with Laclau, Ernesto; Žižek, Slavoj (2000). Contingency, Hegemony, Universality: Contemporary Dialogues on the Left. London: Verso. ISBN 978-1-85984-278-2.
- with Beck-Gernsheim, Elisabeth; Puigvert, Lídia (2003). Women & Social Transformation. New York: Peter Lang. ISBN 978-0-8204-6708-5.
- — (2004). Precarious Life: The Powers of Mourning and Violence. London: Verso. ISBN 978-1-84467-544-9.
- — (2004). Undoing gender. New York: Routledge. ISBN 978-0-203-49962-7.
- — (2005). Giving an account of oneself. New York: Fordham University Press. ISBN 978-0-8232-4677-9.
- with Spivak, Gayatri (2007). Who Sings the Nation-State?: Language, Politics, Belonging. London: Seagull Books. ISBN 978-1-905422-57-9.
- with Asad, Talal; Brown, Wendy; Mahmood, Saba (2009). Is Critique Secular?: Blasphemy, Injury, and Free Speech. Berkeley, California: Townsend Center for the Humanities, University of California Distributed by University of California Press. ISBN 978-0-9823294-1-2.
- — (2009). Frames of War: When Is Life Grievable?. London New York: Verso. ISBN 978-1-84467-333-9.
- with Habermas, Jürgen; Taylor, Charles; West, Cornel (2011). The Power of Religion in the Public Sphere. New York: Columbia University Press. ISBN 978-1-283-00892-1.
- with Weed, Elizabeth (2011). The Question of Gender: Joan W. Scott's Critical Feminism. Bloomington, Indiana: Indiana University Press. ISBN 978-0-253-00153-5.
- — (2012). Parting Ways: Jewishness and the Critique of Zionism. New York: Columbia University Press. ISBN 978-0-231-51795-9.
- with Athanasiou, Athena (2013). Dispossession: The Performative in the Political. Cambridge: Polity Press. ISBN 978-0-7456-5381-5.
- — (2015). Senses of the Subject. New York: Fordham University Press. ISBN 978-0-8232-6467-4.
- — (2015). Notes Toward a Performative Theory of Assembly. Cambridge, Massachusetts: Harvard University Press. ISBN 978-0-674-96775-5.
- with Gambetti, Zeynep (2016). Leticia, Sabsay (ed.). Vulnerability in Resistance. Durham: Duke University Press. ISBN 978-0-8223-6279-1.
- — (2020). The Force of Nonviolence. New York: Penguin Random House. ISBN 978-1-78873-276-5.
- — (2022). What World Is This? A Pandemic Phenomenology. New York: Columbia University Press. ISBN 978-0-231-20828-4.
- — (2024). Who's Afraid of Gender?. New York: Farrar, Straus & Giroux. ISBN 978-0-374-60822-4.

=== Book chapters ===
- Butler, Judith (1982), "Lesbian S & M: the politics of dis-illusion", in Linden, Robin Ruth (ed.), Against sadomasochism: a radical feminist analysis, East Palo Alto, California: Frog in the Well, ISBN 978-0-9603628-3-7.
- ——— (1990), "The pleasures of repetition", in Glick, Robert A.; Bone, Stanley (eds.), Pleasure beyond the pleasure principle: the role of affect in motivation, development, and adaptation, New Haven: Yale University Press, ISBN 978-0-300-04793-6.
- ——— (1991), "Imitation and gender insubordination", in Fuss, Diana (ed.), Inside/out: lesbian theories, gay theories, New York: Routledge, ISBN 978-0-415-90237-3.
- ——— (1993), "Kierkegaard's speculative despair", in Solomon, Robert C.; Higgins, Kathleen M. (eds.), The age of German idealism, Routledge History of Philosophy, Volume VI, London New York: Routledge, pp. 363–395, ISBN 978-0-415-30878-6.
- ——— (1997), "Imitation and gender insubordination", in Nicholson, Linda (ed.), The second wave: a reader in feminist theory, New York: Routledge, pp. 300–316, ISBN 978-0-415-91761-2.
- ——— (1997), "Gender is burning: questions of appropriation and subversion", in McClintock, Anne; Mufti, Aamir; Shohat, Ella (eds.), Dangerous liaisons: gender, nation, and postcolonial perspectives, Minnesota, Minneapolis: University of Minnesota Press, pp. 381–395, ISBN 978-0-8166-2649-6.
- ——— (2001), "Sexual difference as a question of ethics", in Doyle, Laura (ed.), Bodies of resistance: new phenomenologies of politics, agency, and culture, Evanston, Illinois: Northwestern University Press, ISBN 978-0-8101-1847-8.
- ——— (2001), "Appearances aside", in Post, Robert (ed.), Prejudicial appearances: the logic of American antidiscrimination law, Durham, North Carolina: Duke University Press, pp. 73–84, ISBN 978-0-8223-2713-4.
- ——— (2005), "Subjects of sex/gender/desire", in Cudd, Ann; Andreasen, Robin O. (eds.), Feminist theory: a philosophical anthology, Oxford, UK; Malden, Massachusetts: Blackwell Publishing, pp. 145–153, ISBN 978-1-4051-1661-9.
- ——— (2009), "Ronell as gay scientist", in Davis, Diane (ed.), Reading Ronell, Urbana: University of Illinois Press, ISBN 978-0-252-07647-3. A collection of essays on the work of Avital Ronell.
- Blanchet, Nassia; Blanchet, Reginald (April 3, 2010). "Interview with Judith Butler". Hurly-Burly: The International Lacanian Journal of Psychoanalysis. 3.
- ——— (2011), "Lecture notes", in Ronell, Avital; Joubert, Joseph (eds.), Georges Perros (Issue 983 of Collection Europe), Paris: Europe, ISBN 978-2-35150-038-5. Details.
- ——— (2016), "Rethinking Vulnerability and Resistance", in Butler, Judith; Gambetti, Zeynep; Sabsay, Leticia (eds.), Vulnerability in Resistance, Duke University Press, pp. 12–28, ISBN 978-0-8223-6290-6
- ———; Hark, Sabine (2018), "Defamation and the Grammar of Harsh Words", in Sweetapple, Christopher (ed.), The Queer Intersectional in Contemporary Germany, Applied Sexology, Psychosocial-Verlag, pp. 203–207, doi:10.30820/9783837974447, ISBN 978-3-8379-7444-7, ISSN 2367-2420
- ——— (2021), "Bodies that Still Matter", in Halsema, Annemie; Kwastek, Katja; van den Oever, Roel (eds.), Bodies That Still Matter. Resonances of the Work of Judith Butler, Amsterdam University Press, pp. 177–195, ISBN 9789463722940
