= Gender Trouble =

1990 book by Judith Butler

Gender Trouble: Feminism and the Subversion of Identity
- Cover of the first edition
- Author: Judith Butler
- Language: English
- Subjects: Feminism, philosophy, queer theory
- Publisher: Routledge
- Publication date: 1990
- Publication place: United States
- Media type: Print (hardcover and paperback)
- Pages: 272 (UK paperback edition)
- ISBN: 0-415-38955-0
- Preceded by: Subjects of Desire
- Followed by: Bodies That Matter

Gender Trouble: Feminism and the Subversion of Identity is a 1990 book by the post-structuralist gender theorist and philosopher Judith Butler in which the author argues that gender is performative, meaning that it is maintained, created or perpetuated by iterative repetitions when speaking and interacting with each other. Butler draws upon many authors in their (Note: Butler uses she/her and they/them pronouns. (Note: Butler said, "Many people who were assigned 'female' at birth never felt at home with that assignment, and those people (including me) tell all of us something important about the constraints of traditional gender norms for many who fall outside its terms. ... *Judith Butler goes by she or they.") However, Butler prefers they/them pronouns. (Note: " ' Which pronoun do I prefer?' Butler laughs ... . 'It is they', Butler says ... . It is the year 2020, and Butler outs theirself as 'they' - a truly historic moment." („ ‚Welches Pronomen bevorzuge ich?‘ Butler lachte .. . ‚Es ist they‘, sagt Butler ... . Wir haben das Jahr 2020 und Butler outet sich als ‚they‘ - ein wahrhaft historischer Moment.“)) This article uses they/them pronouns for consistency.) work, including Jacques Lacan, Sigmund Freud, Michel Foucault, Julia Kristeva, Jacques Derrida, Simone de Beauvoir, Luce Irigaray, Monique Wittig, among others.

== Summary ==
=== Chapter 1: Subjects of Sex/Gender/Desire ===
Butler criticizes the feminist assumption that there exists an identity and a subject that requires representation in politics and language. For Butler, "men" and "women" are categories complicated by other demographics. Butler eschews identity politics in favor of a new, coalitional feminism that critiques the basis of identity and gender. They challenge assumptions about the distinction often made between sex and gender: that sex is biological while gender is constructed. Butler argues that this false distinction introduces a split in feminism. Sexed bodies cannot signify without gender, and the apparent existence of sex prior to discourse and cultural imposition is only an effect of the functioning of gender. Sex and gender are thus both constructed.

Examining the work of the philosophers Simone de Beauvoir and Luce Irigaray, Butler explores the relationship between power and categories of sex and gender. For de Beauvoir, women constitute a lack against which men establish their identity; for Irigaray, this dialectic belongs to a "signifying economy" that excludes the representation of women altogether by employing phallocentric language. Both assume that there exists a female "self-identical being" in need of representation, and their arguments hide the impossibility of "being" a gender at all. Butler argues instead that gender is performative. (Note: Butler uses the terminology of the English philosopher J. L. Austin, who spoke of speech acts and performative utterances, which are sentences that "do" something while saying something, for example "I promise you that..." is the act of promising, an assumption of responsibility, and not a simple speech. Butler, unlike Austin, extends the "performance" from the verbal to the behavioral level, "arguing that gender was something people did performatively".) If the appearance of “being” a gender is a result of culture, then there exists no universal gender. Constituted through the practice of performance, gender remains open to interpretation. Butler calls for people to "trouble" the categories of gender through performance.

=== Chapter 2: Prohibition, Psychoanalysis, and the Production of the Heterosexual Matrix ===
Butler notes that feminists rely on a supposed pre-patriarchal culture as a model for a new, non-oppressive society. For this reason, accounts of the original transformation of sex into gender by means of the incest taboo have proven particularly useful to feminists. Butler revisits three of the most popular: Claude Lévi-Strauss's structural anthropology, in which the incest taboo necessitates a kinship structure governed by the exchange of women; Joan Riviere's psychoanalytic description of "womanliness as a masquerade" that hides masculine identification and therefore also conceals a desire for another woman; and Sigmund Freud's psychoanalytic explanation of mourning and melancholia, in which loss prompts the ego to incorporate attributes of the lost loved one, in which cathexis becomes identification.

Butler extends these accounts of gender identification in order to emphasize the productive or performative aspects of gender. In discussing Lévi-Strauss, Butler suggests that incest is "a pervasive cultural fantasy" and that the presence of the taboo generates these desires. With Riviere, they state that mimicry forms the "essence" of gender. Finally, with Freud, they assert that "gender identification is a kind of melancholia in which the sex of the prohibited object is internalized as a prohibition", and therefore that "same-sexed gender identification" depends on an unresolved homosexual cathexis (with the father, not the mother, of the Oedipal myth). They argue that for heterosexuality to remain stable, it demands a notion of homosexuality within the bounds of culture. Finally, they point again to incest taboo, which generates and regulates approved heterosexuality and subversive homosexuality, neither of which exists beforehand.

=== Chapter 3: Subversive Bodily Acts ===
In response to the work of psychoanalyst Jacques Lacan that posited a paternal Symbolic order and a repression of the "feminine" required for language and culture, Julia Kristeva added women back into the narrative by claiming that poetic language was a surfacing of the maternal body in writing, uncontrolled by paternal logic. For Kristeva, poetic writing and maternity are the sole culturally permissible ways for women to return to the maternal body that bore them, and female homosexuality is an impossibility. Butler criticizes Kristeva, claiming that her insistence on a "maternal" that precedes culture and on poetry as a return to the maternal body is essentialist. Butler argues the notion of "maternity" as a haven for females is a social construct and invokes arguments by Michel Foucault to posit that maternity defining women is itself a product of discourse.

Butler dismantles part of Foucault's critical introduction to the journals of Herculine Barbin, an intersex person who lived in France during the 19th century and eventually committed suicide after being forced to live as a man by the authorities. In his introduction to the journals, Foucault writes of Barbin's early days, when she was able to live her gender or "sex" as she saw fit as a "happy limbo of nonidentity." Butler accuses Foucault of romanticism, claiming that his proclamation of a blissful identity "prior" to cultural inscription contradicts his work in The History of Sexuality, in which he posits that the idea of a "true" sexual identity is an illusion. Butler instead places Barbin not in a "happy limbo" but part of a larger network of social control.

Butler traces the feminist theorist Monique Wittig's thinking about lesbianism as the one recourse to the constructed notion of sex. The notion of "sex" is always coded as female, according to Wittig, a way to designate the non-male through an absence. Women, thus reduced to "sex", cannot escape carrying sex as a burden. Wittig argues that even naming body parts as sexual creates a fictitious limitation of what body parts can be considered erogenous, socially constructing the features themselves and fragmenting what was once whole.

Butler questions the notion that "the body" itself is a natural entity without a history: Building on the thinking of the anthropologist Mary Douglas, Butler claims that the boundaries of the body have been drawn to define certain taboos. Butler proposes the practice of drag as a way to destabilize the binary and the notion that there is an "original" gender, and to demonstrate playfully to the audience that gender is performative.

== Publication history ==
Routledge first published Gender Trouble: Feminism and the Subversion of Identity in 1990; other Routledge publications occurred in 1999, 2006 (Routledge Classics) and 2007.

== Reception and influence ==
On November 23, 2018, the playwright Jordan Tannahill read the entirety of Gender Trouble outside the Hungarian Parliament Building in protest of Hungarian Prime Minister Viktor Orbán's decision to revoke accreditation and funding for gender studies programs in the country.

== See also ==
- Feminist philosophy
- Poststructuralism
- Third-wave feminism
- Undoing Gender
