= Parting Ways: Jewishness and the Critique of Zionism =

2012 book by Judith Butler

- Author: Judith Butler
- Language: English
- Subject: Zionism; Palestinian nationalism; Anti-Zionism; Israeli–Palestinian conflict; Philosophy
- Publisher: Columbia University Press
- Publication date: 2012
- Publication place: United States
- Media type: Print (paperback and hardcover); Digital (e-book)
- Pages: 256
- ISBN: 978-0-231-14610-4 hardcover edition
- LC Class: DS149.B98 2012
- Preceded by: The Question of Gender: Joan W. Scott's Critical Feminism
- Followed by: Dispossession: The Performative in the Political
- Website: Official website

Parting Ways: Jewishness and the Critique of Zionism is a 2012 book written by American philosopher and gender studies scholar Judith Butler and published by Columbia University Press.

== Background ==
Judith Butler is a Jewish American philosopher, gender studies scholar, and distinguished professor at the University of California, Berkeley. Butler has been an outspoken critic of Israel for decades. Parting Ways was published after, and makes reference to, the 2008-2009 Operation Cast Lead in Gaza, which Butler describes as "violent bombardments of trapped populations" in the book's introduction.

== Overview ==
In Parting Ways, Butler derives a set of ethical principles opposing Zionism, seeking to lay out a framework for cohabitation in Israel/Palestine. While exploring the history of these principles within Jewish thought, they argue that such principles are not uniquely Jewish.

Parting Ways draws from the writings of Edward Said, Emmanuel Levinas, Walter Benjamin, Hannah Arendt, Primo Levi, and Mahmoud Darwish. Butler argues that cohabitation with other groups is a core part of Jewish history and identity, and that Israel and Palestine are inextricably linked. This creates an ethical responsibility for each group towards the other, an idea they borrow from Levinas. Unlike Levinas, however, Butler rejects Zionism and the necessity of the modern state of Israel, arguing that "no democratic polity has the right to secure demographic advantage for any particular ethnic or religious group". Butler imagines a single federal state protecting the rights of all citizens whose inhabitants have reexamined their experiences of exile and dispossession, and forged a new shared identity.

== See also ==
- Anti-Zionism
- Israeli–Palestinian conflict
