= Freudo-Marxism =

Philosophical perspectives informed by Freud and Marx

Freudo-Marxism is a loose designation for philosophical perspectives informed by both the Marxist philosophy of Karl Marx and the psychoanalytic theory of Sigmund Freud. Its history within continental philosophy began in the 1920s and 1930s and continuing since through critical theory, Lacanian psychoanalysis, and post-structuralism.

Sigmund Freud critiqued Marxism in his 1932 New Introductory Lectures on Psychoanalysis, arguing that Marx overemphasized historical determinism and ignored contingent psychological and material factors in shaping society. Freud acknowledged Marxism’s insight into the influence of economic circumstances on human thought and culture, but he did not see history as following inevitable laws.

Freudo-Marxist thought emerged in the 1920s in Germany and the Soviet Union, with theorists like Wilhelm Reich, Erich Fromm, and Valentin Voloshinov exploring connections between psychoanalysis and Marxism. Reich’s work on character and bodily expression influenced later psychotherapies, while Fromm incorporated Freudian ideas into a Marxist framework emphasizing personal freedom. The Frankfurt School further developed these ideas, blending Marx and Freud to analyze social repression, authority, and alienation.

Later developments expanded Freudo-Marxist influence through thinkers like Frantz Fanon, Louis Althusser, Jacques Lacan, Cornelius Castoriadis, and Slavoj Žižek, who integrated psychoanalysis into Marxist theory in diverse ways. Post-structuralist and postmodern philosophers, including Michel Foucault, Jacques Derrida, and Gilles Deleuze with Félix Guattari, also engaged with both traditions, producing works such as Capitalism and Schizophrenia that critiqued society, ideology, and subjectivity through the lens of psychoanalysis and Marxism.

== Sigmund Freud ==
Sigmund Freud engages with Marxism in his 1932 New Introductory Lectures on Psychoanalysis, in which he hesitantly contests what he sees as the Marxist view of history.

According to Freud, Marx erroneously attributes the trajectory of society to a necessary "natural law or conceptual [dialectical] evolution"; instead, Freud suggests, it can be attributed to contingent factors: "psychological factors, such as the amount of constitutional aggressiveness", "the firmness of the organization within the horde" and "material factors, such as the possession of superior weapons". However, Freud does not completely dismiss Marxism: "The strength of Marxism clearly lies, not in its view of history or its prophecies of the future that are based on it, but in its sagacious indication of the decisive influence which the economic circumstances of men have upon their intellectual, ethical and artistic attitudes."

== Emergence ==
The beginnings of Freudo-Marxist theorizing took place in the 1920s in Germany and the Soviet Union. The Soviet pedagogist Aron Zalkind was the most prominent proponent of Marxist psychoanalysis in the Soviet Union. The Soviet philosopher V. Yurinets and the Freudian analyst Siegfried Bernfeld both discussed the topic. The Soviet linguist Valentin Voloshinov, a member of the Bakhtin circle, began a Marxist critique of psychoanalysis in his 1925 article "Beyond the Social", which he developed more substantially in his 1927 book Freudianism: A Marxist Critique. In 1929, Wilhelm Reich's Dialectical Materialism and Psychoanalysis was published in German and Russian in the bilingual communist theory journal Unter dem Banner des Marxismus, 'Under the Banner of Marxism'. At the end of this line of thought can be considered Otto Fenichel's 1934 article Psychoanalysis as the Nucleus of a Future Dialectical-Materialistic Psychology which appeared in Reich's Zeitschrift für Politische Psychologie und Sexualökonomie, 'Journal for Political Psychology and Sex-Economy'. One member of the Berlin group of Marxist psychoanalysts around Reich was Erich Fromm, who later brought Freudo-Marxist ideas into the exiled Frankfurt School led by Max Horkheimer and Theodor W. Adorno.

=== Wilhelm Reich ===
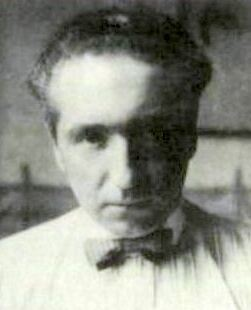
Wilhelm Reich in his mid-20s

Wilhelm Reich was an Austrian psychoanalyst, a member of the second generation of psychoanalysts after Freud, and a radical psychiatrist. His books were the first popular attempt to bridge Freud and Marx, which garnered him the moniker by Gilles Deleuze and Felix Guatarri as "the true founder of materialist psychiatry," the discipline bridging Marx (materialism) and Freud (psychiatry). (Note: They also state that Reich went further than Herbert Marcuse who treated the problem of the relation between individual desire and the social sphere too "lightly.") He was the author of several influential books and essays, most notably Character Analysis (1933), The Mass Psychology of Fascism (1933), and The Sexual Revolution (1936). His work on character contributed to the development of Anna Freud's The Ego and the Mechanisms of Defence (1936), and his idea of muscular armour – the expression of the personality in the way the body moves – shaped innovations such as body psychotherapy, Fritz Perls's Gestalt therapy, Alexander Lowen's bioenergetic analysis, and Arthur Janov's primal therapy. His writing influenced generations of intellectuals: during the 1968 student uprisings in Paris and Berlin, students scrawled his name on walls and threw copies of The Mass Psychology of Fascism at the police.

== Critical theory ==
=== Frankfurt School ===
The Frankfurt School, from the Institute for Social Research, took up the task of choosing what parts of Marx's thought might serve to clarify social conditions which Marx himself had never seen. They drew on other schools of thought to fill in Marx's perceived omissions. Max Weber exerted a major influence, as did Freud. In the Institute's extensive Studien über Authorität und Familie (ed. Max Horkheimer, Paris 1936), Erich Fromm authored the social-psychological part. Another new member of the institute was Herbert Marcuse, who would become famous during the 1950s in the US.

==== Herbert Marcuse ====
Eros and Civilization is one of Marcuse's best known early works. Written in 1955, it is an attempted dialectical synthesis of Marx and Freud whose title alludes to Freud's Civilization and its Discontents. Marcuse's vision of a non-repressive society (which runs rather counter to Freud's conception of society as naturally and necessarily repressive), based on Marx and Freud, anticipated the values of 1960s countercultural social movements.

In the book, Marcuse writes about the social meaning of biology – history seen not as a class struggle, but fight against repression of our instincts. He argues that capitalism (if never named as such) is preventing us from reaching the non-repressive society "based on a fundamentally different experience of being, a fundamentally different relation between man and nature, and fundamentally different existential relations".

==== Erich Fromm ====
Erich Fromm, once a member of the Frankfurt School, left the group at the end of the 1930s. The culmination of Fromm's social and political philosophy was his book The Sane Society, published in 1955, which argued in favor of humanist, democratic socialism. Building primarily upon the works of Marx, Fromm sought to re-emphasise the ideal of personal freedom, missing from most Soviet Marxism, and more frequently found in the writings of classic liberals. Fromm's brand of socialism rejected both Western capitalism and Soviet communism, which he saw as dehumanizing and bureaucratic social structures that resulted in a virtually universal modern phenomenon of alienation.

== Other developments ==
=== Frantz Fanon ===
The French West Indian psychiatrist and philosopher Frantz Fanon drew on both psychoanalytic and Marxist theory in his critique of colonialism. His seminal works in this area include Black Skin, White Masks (1952) and The Wretched of the Earth (1961).

=== Paul Ricœur ===
In his 1965 book Freud and Philosophy: An Essay on Interpretation, the French philosopher Paul Ricœur compared the two (together with Friedrich Nietzsche), characterizing their common method as the "hermeneutics of suspicion".

== Lacanianism ==
Jacques Lacan was a philosophically minded French psychoanalyst, whose perspective gained widespread influence in French psychiatry and psychology. Lacan saw himself as loyal to and rescuing Freud's legacy. In his 16th Seminar, D'un Autre à l'autre, Lacan proposes and develops a homology between the Marxist notion of surplus value and his own notion of surplus-jouissance/objet a. While Lacan was not himself a Marxist, many Marxists drew on his ideas.

=== Louis Althusser ===
The French Marxist philosopher Louis Althusser is widely known as a theorist of ideology, and his best-known essay is Ideology and Ideological State Apparatuses: Notes Toward an Investigation. The essay establishes the concept of ideology, also based on Gramsci's theory of hegemony. Whereas hegemony is ultimately determined entirely by political forces, ideology draws on Freud's and Lacan's concepts of the unconscious and mirror-phase respectively, and describes the structures and systems that allow us to meaningfully have a concept of the self. These structures, for Althusser, are both agents of repression and inevitable – it is impossible to escape ideology, to not be subjected to it. The distinction between ideology and science or philosophy is not assured once and for all by the epistemological break (a term borrowed from Gaston Bachelard): this "break" is not a chronologically determined event, but a process. Instead of an assured victory, there is a continuous struggle against ideology: "Ideology has no history".

His essay Contradiction and Overdetermination borrows the concept of overdetermination from psychoanalysis, in order to replace the idea of "contradiction" with a more complex model of multiple causality in political situations (an idea closely related to Gramsci's concept of hegemony).

=== Cornelius Castoriadis ===
Greek-French philosopher, psychoanalyst, and social critic Cornelius Castoriadis also followed up on the work of Lacan.

=== Slavoj Žižek ===
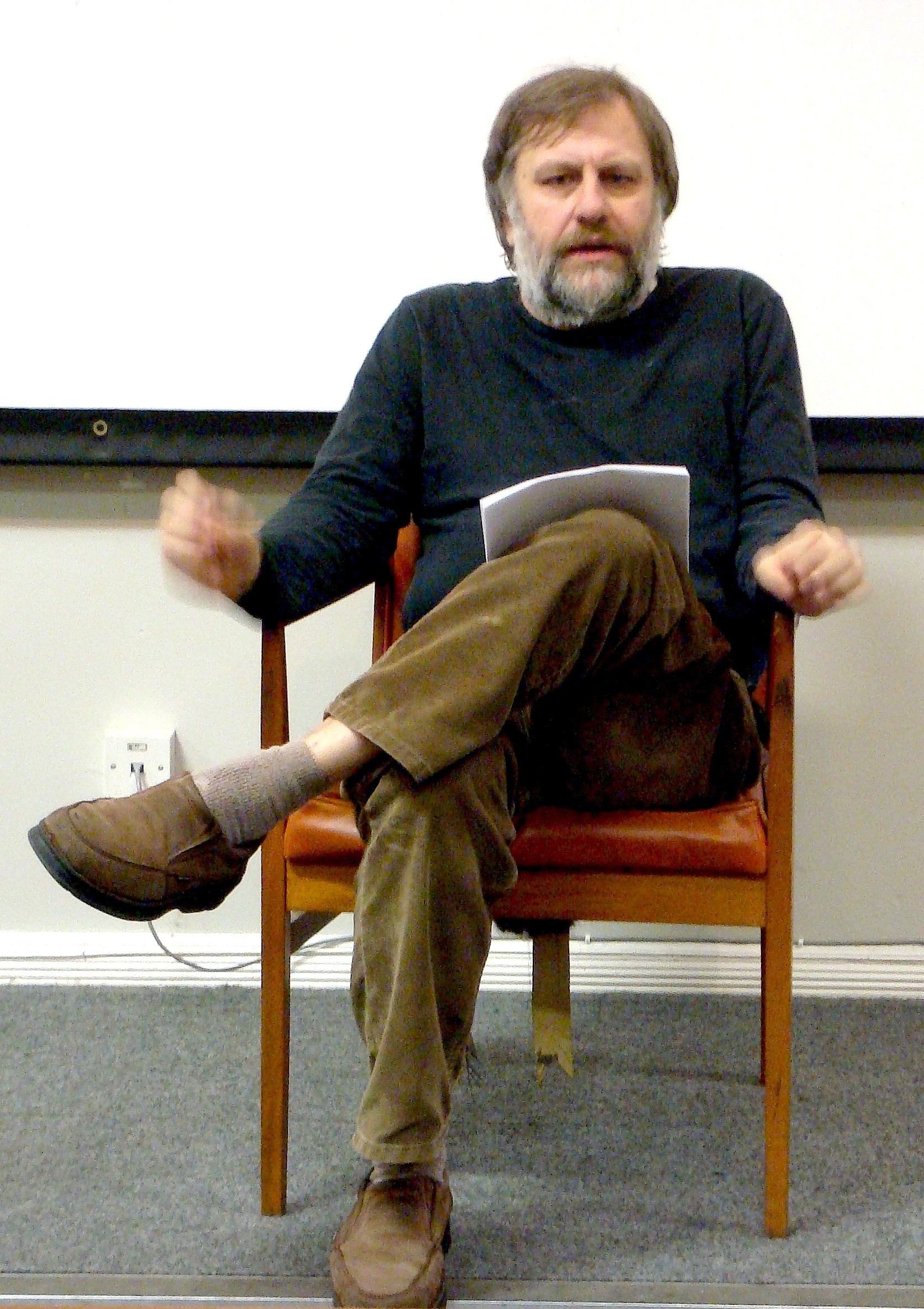
Slavoj Žižek in 2008

The Slovenian philosopher Slavoj Žižek promotes a form of Marxism highly modified by Lacanian psychoanalysis and Hegelian philosophy. Žižek contests Althusser's account of ideology because it misses the role of subjectivity.

== Post-structuralism ==
Major French philosophers associated with post-structuralism, post-modernism, and/or deconstruction, including Jean-François Lyotard, Michel Foucault, and Jacques Derrida, engaged deeply with both Marxism and psychoanalysis. Most notably, Gilles Deleuze and Félix Guattari collaborated on the theoretical work Capitalism and Schizophrenia in two volumes: Anti-Oedipus (1972) and A Thousand Plateaus (1980).

== Major works ==
- Freudianism: A Marxist Critique (1927) by Valentin Voloshinov
- Character Analysis (1933) by Wilhelm Reich
- Black Skin, White Masks (1952) by Frantz Fanon
- Eros and Civilization: A Philosophical Inquiry into Freud (1955) by Herbert Marcuse
- The Sane Society (1955) by Erich Fromm
- Life Against Death: The Psychoanalytical Meaning of History (1959) by Norman O. Brown
- Ideology and Ideological State Apparatuses (1970) by Louis Althusser
- Capitalism and Schizophrenia (1972/1980) by Gilles Deleuze and Félix Guattari
- Libidinal Economy (1974) by Jean-François Lyotard
- False Consciousness: An Essay on Reification by Joseph Gabel
- The Sublime Object of Ideology (1989) by Slavoj Žižek

== See also ==
- Class consciousness
- Crowd psychology
- Critical psychology
- Critique of political economy
