= Lucien Sève =

French philosopher and political activist (1926–2020)

- Born: 9 December 1926; Chambéry, Savoie, France
- Died: 23 March 2020 (aged 93); Clamart, Île-de-France, France
- Political party: PCF (1950–2010)

Education
- Education: École normale supérieure

Lucien Sève (French: [lysjɛ̃ sɛv]; 9 December 1926 – 23 March 2020) was a French philosopher, communist and political activist. He was an active member of the French Communist Party (PCF) from 1950 to 2010. His 1969 work Marxisme et théorie de la personnalité (Marxism and theory of personality) has been translated into 25 different languages. Sève died on 23 March 2020 of COVID-19.

== Family, career and death ==
Sève was born in 1926 in Chambéry. His parents ran a publishing house for children's books. He studied at the Lycée de Chambéry, and the Lycée du Parc. Sève entered the École normale supérieure in 1945, where he earned agrégation of philosophy in 1949. He became a philosophy teacher at a lycée in Brussels, although he was later removed from the post due to his Marxist beliefs. Sève performed military service in Algeria, from 1952 to 1953. After his military service, he worked at the Lycée Saint-Charles in Marseille.

In 1952, Sève married Françoise Guille in Gap, Hautes-Alpes, and they had two children. Guille died in 2011. Sève died on 23 March 2020 of COVID-19 at the age of 93.

== Political life ==
Sève was an avid Politzerian. He supported the views of fellow French Marxist philosophers Louis Althusser and Roger Garaudy, arguing that the PCF should follow some humanist aspects of the Marxist philosophy. However, Sève also focused on a scientific, rather than a purely humanist or non-humanist, basis for Marxism, something that was different from most Western European Marxist ideas of the time. Most Western Communist parties, including the French Communist Party, were moving towards social democracy. He also focused upon the relationship between Marxism and psychology. He supported a Communist regime where the Communist Party was the dominant force, and as such his views have been compared to Joseph Stalin's USSR. Nevertheless, after the death of Stalin, Sève supported the De-Stalinization of the USSR. In the 1980s, Sève supported the creation of the medical ethics committee Comité consultatif national d'éthique (CCNE). He was a member of the CCNE committee from 1983 to 2000. He was a supporter of embryo testing, but only from excess IVF embryos. He saw embryos as "the potential of a human being", so considered using them solely for testing as unethical. Sève also had very strong opinions on how a Marxist biography should be written. His works included very specific, albeit almost unachievable, criteria that he believed should be adhered to for all Marxist biographies. He was a founding member of the Grande Édition de Marx et d'Engels project, which aimed to translate and republish all of Marx's and Friedrich Engels' works. In 2019, on the 30th anniversary of the fall of the Berlin Wall, Sève gave an interview in which he said that Communism is relevant today, and that Karl Marx was centuries ahead of his time.

In 1950, Sève joined the French Communist Party (PCF). He was elected as a member of the Central Committee in 1961, and remained a member of it until 1994. From 1970 to 1982, he ran the PCF publishing house. He was appointed to this role because members of the PCF considered him one of the best intellectuals in the party. In 1970, he attended a panel discussion organised by Catherine Clément, which also included Serge Leclaire and André Green. During the 1980s, Sève began to distance himself from the PCF after disagreements with the political leaders. In 1984, he proposed a refounding of the PCF, arguing that the party had lost its way. Sève resigned from the party in 2010, citing a lack of public support for the party at the 2007 French presidential election and 2010 French regional elections, as well as a distaste for the youth wing of the party.

== Works ==
In 1969, he authored the work Marxisme et théorie de la personnalité (Marxism and theory of personality). The work has been translated into 25 different languages. His 1978 work Man in Marxist theory and the psychology of personality focused on how personality was a "product of social relations". This strongly opposed Hans Eysenck's view that personality was a mixture of genetics and learned behaviours. In 1990, he authored Communisme : quel second souffle? (Communism: what a second wind?), and from 2004 to 2019, he worked on four volumes of Penser avec Marx aujourd’hui (Thinking with Marx today.) The works aimed to highlight Sève's perceived problems with various interpretations of Marxism, including Stalinism, ideological mistreatment by Luc Ferry, and theories from Louis Althusser and Gilles Deleuze that Sève believed incompatible with Marxism. The first of the four volumes was entitled Marx et nous (Marx and us), and the second volume, published in 2008, was entitled L'homme? (The Person). In 2008, he was awarded a prize by the Union rationaliste.

=== List ===
- Sève, L. (1954), La Science (The science), Les Éditions scolaires
- Sève, L. (1969), Marxisme et théorie de la personalité (Marxism and theory of personality), Éditions sociales.
- Sève, L. (1974), Textes sur la méthode de la science économique (Texts on the method of economics), Éditions sociales
- Sève, L. (1975), Marxism and the theory of human personality, Lawrence & Wishart
- Sève, L., & Clément, C. (1977). Pour une critique marxiste de la théorie psychanalytique (For a Marxist critique of psychoanalytic theory), Éditions sociales
- Sève, L. (1978), Man in Marxist theory and the psychology of personality, Hassocks: Harvester Press
- Sève, L. (1980), Une introduction à la philosophie marxiste: Suivie d’un vocabulaire philosophique (An introduction to Marxist philosophy: Followed by a philosophical vocabulary), Éditions sociales
- Sève, L. (1984), Structuralisme et dialectique (Structuralism and dialectics), Messidor/Editions sociales
- Sève, L. (1994), Pour une critique de la raison bioéthique (For a critique of bioethical reason), Odile Jacob
- Sève, L. (1998), Sciences et dialectiques de la nature (Natural sciences and dialectics), La Dispute
- Sève, L. (1999), Commencer par les fins: La nouvelle question communiste (Start with the Ends: The New Communist Question), La Dispute
- Sève, L. (2001), Sciences de l’homme et de la société: La responsabilité des scientifiques (Human and social sciences: The responsibility of scientists), L’Harmattan
- Sève, L. (2004), Marx et nous (Marx and us), La Dispute
- Sève, L. (2005), Émergence, complexité et dialectique: Sur les systèmes dynamiques non linéaires (Emergence, complexity and dialectics: On nonlinear dynamical systems), Odile Jacob
- Sève, L. (2006), Qu’est-ce que la personne humaine? (What is the human person?), La Dispute
- Sève, L. (2008), L’homme? (The Person), La Dispute
- Sève, L. (2008), Dialectics of emergence. In: Ollman, B. & Smith, T. (Eds.) (2008), Dialectics for the new century, Palgrave Macmillan https://link.springer.com/chapter/10.1057/9780230583818_6
