= Overdetermined =

Overdetermined may refer to:

- Overdetermined systems in various branches of mathematics
- Overdetermination in various fields of psychology or analytical thought
