= Bölk =

Bölk is a German surname. Notable people with the surname include:

- Andrea Bölk (born 1968), German handball player
- Emily Bölk (born 1998), German handball player

== See also ==
- Louis Bolk (1866–1930), Dutch anatomist
