= Interpellation =

Interpellation may refer to:

- Interpellation (philosophy), the process by which a dominant ideology or culture addresses individuals as particular socially defined subjects and positions them to recognize themselves within those roles
- Interpellation (politics), the right of the members to ask questions from the government

== See also ==
- Interpellator
