= Lenin and Philosophy and Other Essays =

Lenin and Philosophy and other Essays
- Author: Louis Althusser
- Translator: Ben Brewster
- Language: English
- Subject: Marxism, philosophy, ideology, psychoanalysis, art
- Publication date: 1971
- Media type: Print
- Pages: 229
- ISBN: 0-902308-12-2
- OCLC: 633324214
- Dewey Decimal: 335.4112 (146.3, 335.43)
- LC Class: B4249.L384 (definition books)

Lénine et la Philosophie suivi de Marx et Lénine devant Hegel
- Author: Louis Althusser
- Language: French
- Series: Petite Collection
- Subject: Vladimir Lenin, Karl Marx, Hegel, philosophy
- Publication date: 1972
- Publication place: France
- Media type: Print
- Pages: 91
- OCLC: 559058
- Dewey Decimal: 190, 320
- LC Class: B4249.L384 (definition books)

Lénine et la Philosophie (Lenin and Philosophy)
- Cover of the first edition
- Author: Louis Althusser
- Original title: Lénine et la Philosophie
- Language: French
- Series: Collection ‘Théorie’
- Subject: Vladimir Lenin, philosophy
- Publication date: 1969
- Publication place: France
- English publication date: 1971
- Media type: Print
- Pages: 59
- OCLC: 250566779
- Dewey Decimal: 146.32, 190 (320.532) (335.4)
- LC Class: B4249.L384 (definition books)

Lenin and Philosophy and Other Essays is a collection of essays, written by the Marxist philosopher Louis Althusser, published in 1971. A similar edition in French is Lénine et la philosophie suivi de Marx et Lénine devant Hegel (Paris, 1972).

Both editions consist of Althusser's lecture at the Société française de philosophie ‘Lenin and Philosophy’ (French: Lénine et la Philosophie) as well as of Althusser's essay ‘Lenin before Hegel’ (French: Lénine devant Hegel) (written in 1968; first published [in French]: 1970).

A third essay within the French edition is Sur la rapport de Marx à Hegel (About the relationship of Marx to Hegel) (written in 1969; first published [in German]: 1970). This essay is not part of the English edition.

Rather the English edition additionally consists of a foreword, written by Althusser himself, and six other works of Althusser, which are not part of the French edition. Among these six works is Althusser's famous essay ‘Ideology and Ideological State Apparatuses’.

== Most recent English editions ==
Louis Althusser, Lenin and Philosophy and Other Essays. [Newly] introduced by Fredric Jameson. Translated from the French by Ben Brewster (Dewey classification: 335.43)

- Monthly Review Press: New York, 2001 (ISBN 1-583-67039-4 [pbk.]; 1-583-67038-6 [cloth]); XVII + 173 pages; Table of Content)
- Aakar Books: Delhi, 2006 (ISBN 81-87879-85-8; XVII + 173 pages; OCLC: 838361487)
