= Louis Althusser =

French Marxist philosopher (1918–1990)

- Born: Louis Pierre Althusser; 16 October 1918; Birmendreïs, French Algeria
- Died: 22 October 1990 (aged 72); Paris, France
- Political party: PCF (1948–1990)
- Spouse: Hélène Rytmann (m. c. 1975; d. 1980)

Education
- Education: École Normale Supérieure; University of Picardie
- Doctoral advisor: Yvon Belaval
- Other advisors: Gaston Bachelard; Jean-Toussaint Desanti; Maurice de Gandillac

Philosophical work
- Era: 20th-century philosophy
- Region: Western philosophy
- School: Continental philosophy; Western Marxism; Structural Marxism
- Institutions: École Normale Supérieure
- Notable students: See list: Alain Badiou; Étienne Balibar; Michel Foucault; Marta Harnecker; Robert Linhart; Pierre Macherey; Jean-Luc Marion; Jacques-Alain Miller; Jean-Claude Milner; Chantal Mouffe; Jacques Rancière; François Regnault
- Main interests: Politics; economics; ideology
- Notable works: For Marx (1965); Reading Capital (1965); "Ideology and Ideological State Apparatuses" (1970)
- Notable ideas: Epistemological break between the Young and Mature Marx; Overdetermination; Ideological state apparatuses; Interpellation; Aleatory materialism; Determination in the last instance; "Individuals are always-already subjects"

Louis Pierre Althusser (UK: /ˌæltʊˈsɛər/, US: /ˌɑːltuːˈsɛər/; French: [altysɛʁ]; 16 October 1918 – 22 October 1990) was a French Marxist philosopher who studied at the École Normale Supérieure in Paris, where he eventually became professor of philosophy. Althusser's life was marked by periods of intense mental illness. In 1980, he killed his wife, the sociologist Hélène Rytmann, by strangling her. He was declared unfit to stand trial due to insanity and was committed to a psychiatric hospital for three years. He did little further academic work, dying in 1990.

Althusser is commonly referred to as a structural Marxist, although his relationship to other schools of French structuralism is not a simple affiliation and he was critical of many aspects of structuralism. He later described himself as a social anarchist. Althusser was a long-time member and sometimes a strong critic of the French Communist Party. His arguments and theses were set against the threats that he saw attacking the theoretical foundations of Marxism. These included both the influence of empiricism on Marxist theory, and humanist and reformist orientations which manifested as divisions in the European communist parties, as well as the problem of the cult of personality and of ideology.

== Biography ==
=== Early life: 1918–1948 ===
Althusser was born in French Algeria in the town of Birmendreïs, near Algiers, to a pied-noir petit-bourgeois family from Alsace, France. His father, Charles-Joseph Althusser, was a lieutenant in the French army and a bank clerk, while his mother, Lucienne Marthe Berger, a devout Catholic, worked as a schoolteacher. According to his own memoirs, his Algerian childhood was prosperous; historian Martin Jay said that Althusser, along with Albert Camus and Jacques Derrida, was "a product of the French colonial culture in Northern Africa." In 1930, his family moved to the French city of Marseille as his father was to be the director of the Compagnie Algérienne bank branch in the city. Althusser spent the rest of his childhood there, excelling in his studies at the Lycée Saint-Charles and joining a scout group. A second displacement occurred in 1936 when Althusser settled in Lyon as a student at the Lycée du Parc. Later he was accepted by the highly regarded higher-education establishment (grande école) École Normale Supérieure (ENS) in Paris. At the Lycée du Parc, Althusser was influenced by Catholic professors, (Note: Among them, the philosophers Jean Guitton (1901–1999) and Jean Lacroix (1900–1986) and the historian Joseph Hours (1896–1963).) joined the Catholic youth movement Jeunesse Étudiante Chrétienne, and wanted to be a Trappist. His interest in Catholicism coexisted with his communist ideology, and some critics argued that his early Catholic introduction affected the way he interpreted Karl Marx.

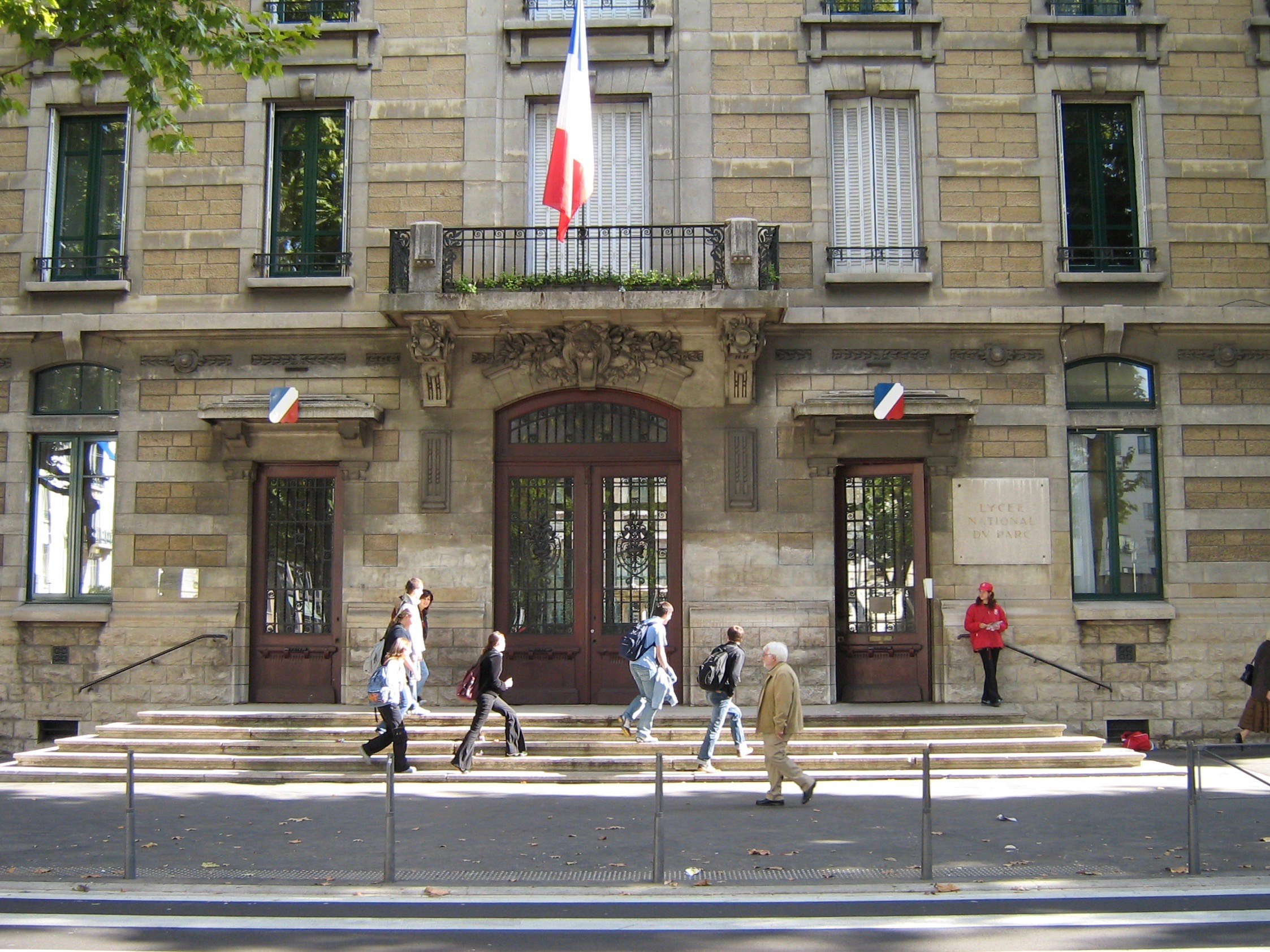
The Lycée du Parc, where Althusser studied for two years and was influenced by Catholic professors

After a two-year period of preparation (khâgne) under Jean Guitton at the Lycée du Parc, Althusser was admitted into the ENS in July 1939. But his attendance was deferred by many years because he was drafted into the French Army in September of that year in the run-up to World War II and, like most French soldiers following the Fall of France, was captured by the Germans. Seized in Vannes in June 1940, he was held in a prisoner-of-war camp in Schleswig-Holstein, in Northern Germany, for the five remaining years of the war. In the camp, he was at first drafted to hard labour but ultimately reassigned to work in the infirmary after falling ill. This second occupation allowed him to read philosophy and literature. In his memoirs, Althusser described the experiences of solidarity, political action, and community in the camp as the moment he first understood the idea of communism. Althusser recalled: "It was in prison camp that I first heard Marxism discussed by a Parisian lawyer in transit—and that I actually met a communist". His experience in the camp also affected his lifelong bouts of mental instability, reflected in constant depression that lasted until the end of life. Psychoanalyst Élisabeth Roudinesco has argued that the absurd war experience was essential for Althusser's philosophical thought.

Althusser resumed his studies at the ENS in 1945 to prepare himself for the agrégation, an exam to teach philosophy in secondary schools. In 1946, Althusser met sociologist Hélène Rytmann, (Note: She was also known as Hélène Legotien and Hélène Legotien-Rytmann because "Legotien" had been her cover name in the Resistance and she continued to use it. There is some divergence on how to spell her last name; some sources spell it as "Rytman", while others use "Rytmann". In Althusser's compilation of his letters to his wife, Lettres à Hélène, he always addressed her as "Rytmann", although the book's own preface by Bernard-Henri Lévy calls her "Rytman".) a Jewish former French Resistance member with whom he was in a relationship until he killed her by strangulation in 1980. That same year, he started a close friendly relationship with Jacques Martin, a translator of G. W. F. Hegel and Hermann Hesse. Martin, to whom Althusser dedicated his first book, would later commit suicide. Martin was influential on Althusser's interest on reading the bibliography of Jean Cavaillès, Georges Canguilhem and Hegel. Although Althusser remained a Catholic, he became more associated with left-wing groups, joining the "worker-priests" movement and embracing a synthesis of Christian and Marxist thought. This combination may have led him to adopt German Idealism and Hegelian thought, as did Martin's influence and a renewed interest in Hegel in the 1930s and 1940s in France. In consonance, Althusser's 1947 DES (diplôme d'études supérieures) thesis, roughly equivalent to an M.A. thesis, was "On Content in the Thought of G. W. F. Hegel" ("Du contenu dans la pensée de G. W. F. Hegel"). Based on The Phenomenology of Spirit, and under Gaston Bachelard's supervision, Althusser wrote a dissertation on how Marx's philosophy refused to withdraw from the Hegelian master–slave dialectic. According to the researcher Gregory Elliott, Althusser was a Hegelian at that time but only for a short period.

=== Academic life and Communist Party affiliation: 1948–1959 ===
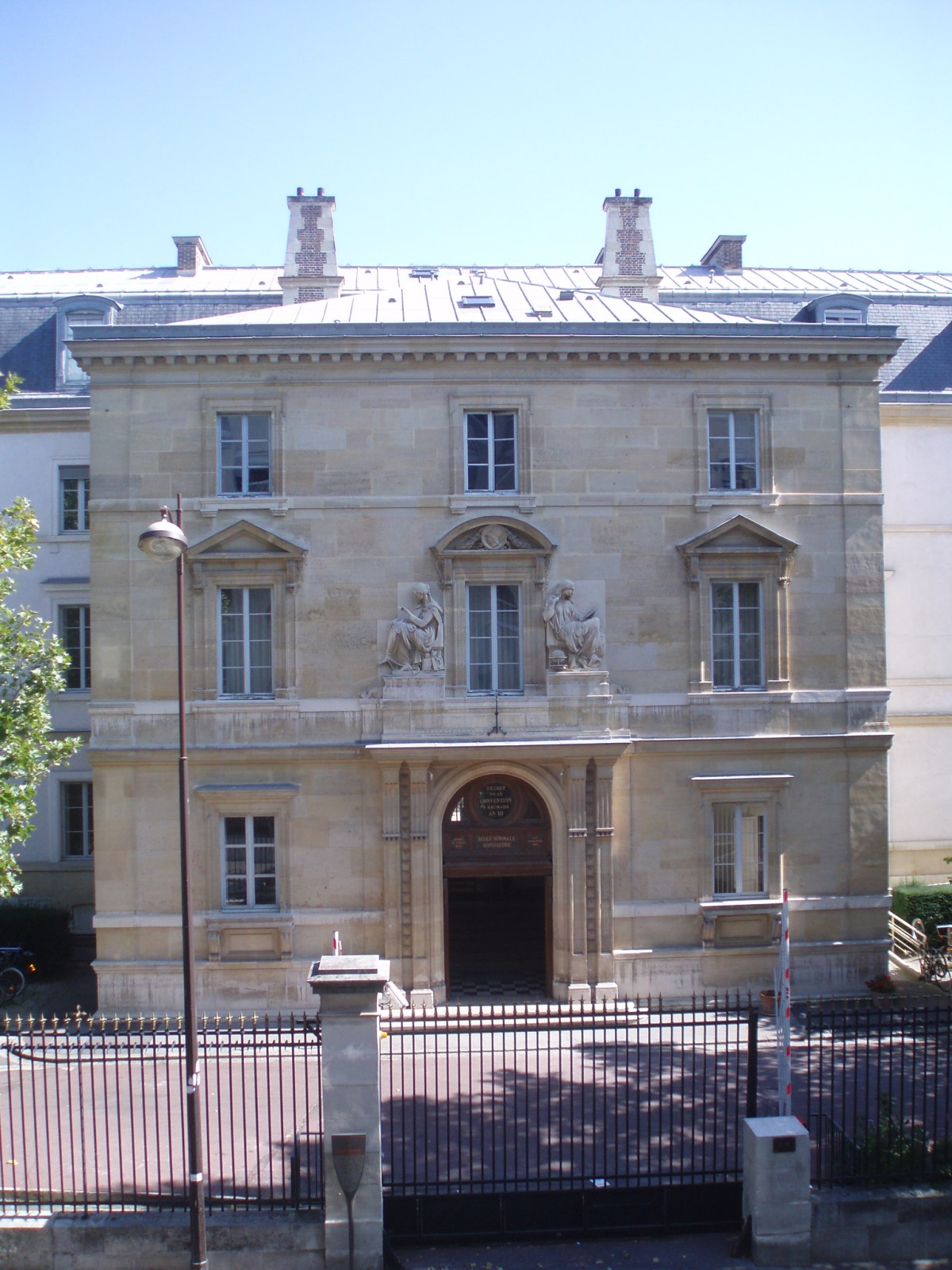
The main entrance to the École Normale Supérieure on Rue d'Ulm, where Althusser established himself as well-known intellectual

In 1948, he was approved to teach in secondary schools but instead became a tutor at the ENS to help students prepare for their own agrégation. His performance on the exam—he was the best ranked on the writing part and second on the oral module—guaranteed this change on his occupation. He was responsible for offering special courses and tutorials on particular topics and on particular figures from the history of philosophy. In 1954, he became secrétaire de l'école litteraire (secretary of the literary school), assuming responsibility for managing and directing the school. Althusser was deeply influential at the ENS because of the lectures and conferences he organized with participation of leading French philosophers like Gilles Deleuze and Jacques Lacan. He also influenced a generation of French philosophers and French philosophy in general—among his students were Derrida, Pierre Bourdieu, Michel Foucault, and Michel Serres. In total, Althusser spent 35 years in the ENS, working there until November 1980.

Parallel to his academic life, Althusser joined the French Communist Party (Parti communiste français, PCF) in October 1948. In the early postwar years, the PCF was one of the most influential political forces and many French intellectuals joined it. Althusser himself declared, "Communism was in the air in 1945, after the German defeat, the victory at Stalingrad, and the hopes and lessons of the Resistance." Althusser was primarily active on the "Peace Movement" section and kept for a few years his Catholic beliefs; in 1949, he published in the L'Évangile captif (The captive gospel), the tenth book of the Jeunesse de l'Église (the youth wing of Church), an article on the historic situation of Catholicism in response to the question: "Is the good news preached to the men today?" In it, he wrote about the relationship between the Catholic Church and the labour movement, advocating at the same time for social emancipation and the Church "religious reconquest". There was mutual hostility between these two organizations—in the early 1950s, the Vatican prohibited Catholics from membership in the worker priests and left-wing movements—and it certainly affected Althusser since he firmly believed in this combination.

Initially afraid of joining the party because of ENS's opposition to communists, Althusser did so when he was made a tutor—when membership became less likely to affect his employment—and he even created at ENA the Cercle Politzer, a Marxist study group. Althusser also introduced colleagues and students to the party and worked closely with the communist cell of the ENS. But his professionalism made him avoid Marxism and Communism in his classes; instead, he helped students depending on the demands of their agrégation. In the early 1950s, Althusser distanced himself from his youthful political and philosophical ideals and from Hegel, whose teachings he considered a "bourgeois" philosophy. Starting from 1948, he studied history of philosophy and gave lectures on it; the first was about Plato in 1949. In 1949–1950, he gave a lecture about René Descartes, (Note: He also lectured about Descartes' thought relation to Nicolas Malebranche, as can be found in an inventory of his archives by the Institute for Contemporary Publishing Archives (L'Institut mémoires de l'édition contemporaine, IMEC).) and wrote a thesis titled "Politics and Philosophy in the Eighteenth Century" and a small study on Jean-Jacques Rousseau's "Second Discourse". He presented the thesis to Jean Hyppolite and Vladimir Jankélévitch in 1950 but it was rejected. These studies were nonetheless valuable because Althusser later used them to write his book about Montesquieu's philosophy and an essay on Rousseau's The Social Contract. Indeed, his first and the only book-length study published during his lifetime was Montesquieu, la politique et l'histoire ("Montesquieu: Politics and History") in 1959. He also lectured on Rousseau from 1950 to 1955, and changed his focus to philosophy of history, also studying Voltaire, Condorcet, and Helvétius, which resulted in a 1955–1956 lecture on "Les problèmes de la philosophie de l'histoire". This course and others on Machiavelli (1962), 17th- and 18th-century political philosophy (1965–1966), Locke (1971), and Hobbes (1971–1972) were later edited and published by François Matheron in 2006. From 1953 to 1960, Althusser did not often publish on Marxist themes, which gave him time to focus on his teaching and establish himself as a reputable philosopher and researcher.

=== Major works, For Marx and Reading Capital: 1960–1968 ===
Althusser resumed his Marxist-related publications in 1960 as he translated, edited, and published a collection directed by Hyppolite about Ludwig Feuerbach's works. The objective of this endeavour was to identify Feuerbach's influence on Marx's early writings, contrasting it with the absence of his thought on Marx's mature works. This work spurred him to write "On the Young Marx: Theoretical Questions" ("Sur le jeune Marx – Questions de théorie", 1961). Published in the journal La Pensée, it was the first in a series of articles about Marx that were later collected in his most famous book For Marx. He inflamed the French debate on Marx and Marxist philosophy, and gained a considerable number of supporters. Inspired by this recognition, he started to publish more articles on Marxist thought; in 1964, Althusser published an article titled "Freud and Lacan" in the journal La Nouvelle Critique, which greatly influenced Freudo-Marxist thought. At the same time, he invited Lacan to a lecture on Baruch Spinoza and the fundamental concepts of psychoanalysis. The impact of the articles led Althusser to change his teaching style at the ENS, and he started to conduct a series of seminars on the following topics: "On the Young Marx" (1961–1962), "The Origins of Structuralism" (1962–1963; on Foucault's History of Madness, which Althusser highly appreciated), "Lacan and Psychoanalysis" (1963–1964), and "Reading Capital" (1964–1965). These seminars aimed for a "return to Marx" and were attended by a new generation of students. (Note: These included Étienne Balibar (1942–), Alain Badiou (1937–), Pierre Macherey (1938–), Dominique Lecourt (1944–), Régis Debray (1940–), Jacques Rancière (1940–), and Jacques-Alain Miller (1944–).)

For Marx (a collection of works published between 1961 and 1965) and Reading Capital (in collaboration with some of his students), both published in 1965, brought international fame to Althusser. Despite being criticized widely, these books made Althusser a sensation in French intellectual circles and one of the leading theoreticians of the PCF. He supported a structuralist view of Marx's work, influenced by Cavaillès and Canguilhem, affirming that Marx laid the "cornerstones" of a new science, incomparable to all non-Marxist thought; and this new science's fundamental principles he himself espoused from 1960 to 1966. Critiques were carried out of Stalin's cult of personality and Althusser defended what he called "theoretical anti-humanism", as an alternative to Stalinism and the Marxist humanism—both popular at the time. At mid-decade, his popularity grew to the point that it was virtually impossible to have an intellectual debate about political or ideological theoretical questions without mentioning his name. Althusser's ideas were influential enough to arouse the creation of a young militant group to dispute the power within the PCF. Nevertheless, the official position of the party was still Stalinist Marxism, which was criticized both from Maoist and humanist groups. Althusser was initially careful not to identify with Maoism but progressively agreed with its critique of Stalinism. At the end of 1966, Althusser even published an unsigned article titled "On the Cultural Revolution", in which he considered the beginning of the Chinese Cultural Revolution as "a historical fact without precedent" and of "enormous theoretical interest". Althusser mainly praised the non-bureaucratic, non-party, mass organizations in which, in his opinion, the "Marxist principles regarding the nature of the ideological" were fully applied.

Key events in the theoretical struggle took place in 1966. In January, there was a conference of communist philosophers in Choisy-le-Roi; Althusser was absent, but Roger Garaudy, the official philosopher of the party, read an indictment that opposed the "theoretical anti-humanism". The controversy was the pinnacle of a long conflict between the supporters of Althusser on the one hand, and those of Garaudy on the other. During March, in Argenteuil, the theses of Garaudy and Althusser were formally examined by the PCF Central Committee, chaired by Louis Aragon. The Party decided to keep Garaudy's position as the official one, and even Lucien Sève—who was a student of Althusser at the beginning of his teaching at the ENS—supported the party's decision, becoming in consequence the philosopher who remained closest to the PCF leadership. General secretary of the party, Waldeck Rochet said that "Communism without humanism would not be Communism". Whilst Althusser was not publicly censured (nor was he expelled from the PCF, as were 600 Maoist students), the party's continued support of Garaudy resulted in a further reduction of Althusser's influence in the party.

Still in 1966, Althusser published in the Cahiers pour l'Analyse the article "On the 'Social Contract'" ("Sur le 'Contrat Social'"), a course about Rousseau he had given at the ENS, and "Cremonini, Painter of the Abstract" ("Cremonini, peintre de l'abstrait") about Italian painter Leonardo Cremonini. In the following year, he wrote a long article titled "The Historical Task of Marxist Philosophy" ("La tâche historique de la philosophie marxiste") that was submitted to the Soviet journal Voprossi Filosofii; it was not accepted but was published a year later in a Hungarian journal. In 1967–1968, Althusser and his students organized an ENS course titled "Philosophy Course for Scientists" ("Cours de philosophie pour scientifiques") that would be interrupted by May 1968 events. Some of the material of the course was reused in his 1974 book Philosophy and the Spontaneous Philosophy of the Scientists (Philosophie et philosophie spontanée des savants). Another Althusser's significant work from this period was "Lenin and Philosophy", a lecture first presented in February 1968 at the French Society of Philosophy.

=== May 1968, Eurocommunism debates, and auto-critique: 1968–1978 ===
During May 68, the tumultuous events of May 1968 in France, Althusser was hospitalized because of a depressive breakdown and was absent from the Latin Quarter. Many of his students participated in the events, and Régis Debray in particular became an international celebrity revolutionary. Althusser's initial silence was met with criticism by the protesters, who wrote on walls: "Of what use is Althusser?" ("A quoi sert Althusser?"). Later, Althusser was ambivalent about it; on the one hand, he was not supportive of the movement and he criticized the movement as an "ideological revolt of the mass", adopting the PCF official argument that an "infantile disorder" of anarchistic utopianism that had infiltrated the student movement. On the other hand, he called it "the most significant event in Western history since the Resistance and the victory over Nazism" and wanted to reconcile the students and the PCF. Nevertheless, the Maoist journal La Cause du peuple called him a revisionist, and he was condemned by former students, mainly by Jacques Rancière. After it, Althusser went through a phase of "self-criticism" that resulted in the book Essays in Self-criticism (Éléments d'autocritique, 1974) in which he revisited some of his old positions, including his support of the Soviet invasion of Czechoslovakia.

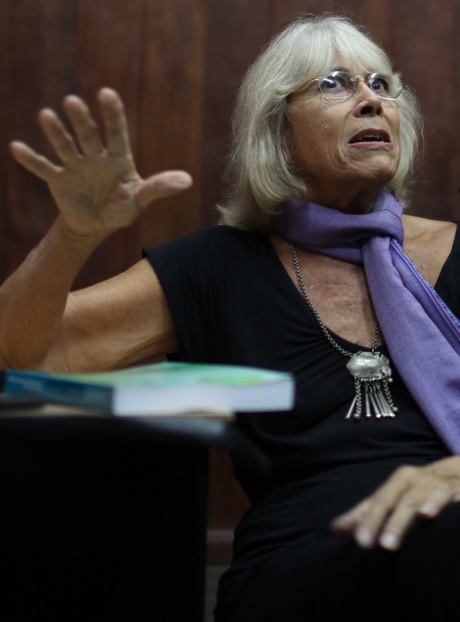
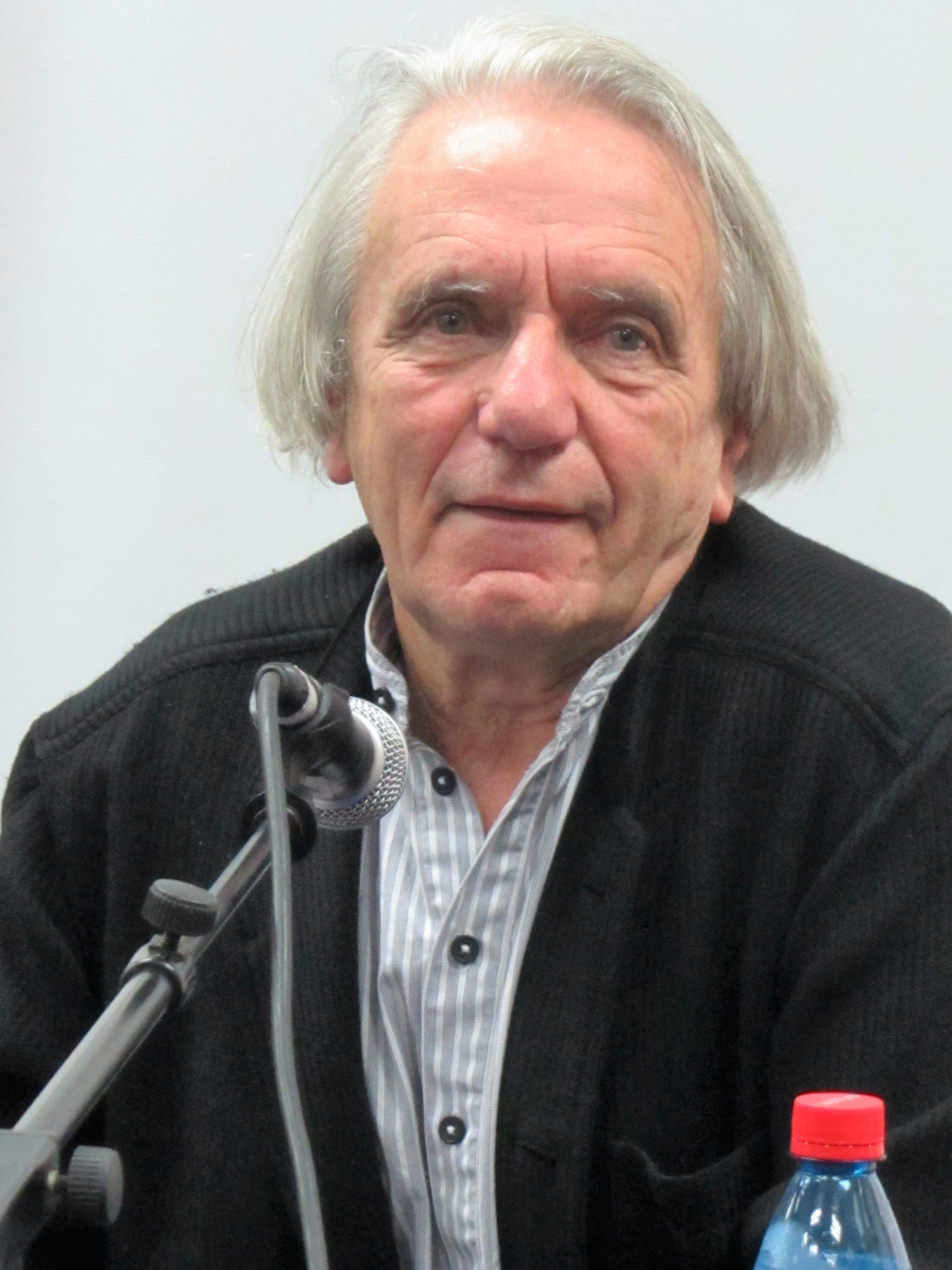
While Althusser was criticized in France by his former students, such as Jacques Rancière (right), his influence in Latin America grew, as exemplified by Marta Harnecker (left).

In 1969, Althusser started an unfinished work (Note: Balibar referred to it as "L'Etat, le Droit, la Superstructure" ("The State, the Law, the Superstructure"), while Elliott cited it as "De la superstructure (Droit-État-Idéologie)" ("On the Superstructure (Law-State-Ideology)"). The IMEC archives report the existence of "De la superstructure", latter called "Qu'est-ce que la philosophie marxiste-léniniste?" ("What is the Marxist-Lenist philosophy?") and reworked as "La reproduction des rapports de production" ("The reproduction of relations of production"), but that ultimately returned to its first title.) that was only released in 1995 as Sur la reproduction ("On the Reproduction"). However, from these early manuscripts, he developed "Ideology and Ideological State Apparatuses", which was published in the journal La Pensée in 1970, and became very influential on ideology discussions. In the same year, Althusser wrote "Marxism and Class Struggle" ("Marxisme et lutte de classe") that would be the foreword to the book The Basic Concepts of Historical Materialism of his former student, the Chilean Marxist sociologist Marta Harnecker. By this time, Althusser was very popular in Latin America: some leftist activists and intellectuals saw him almost as a new Marx, although his work has been the subject of heated debates and sharp criticism. As an example of this popularity, some of his works were first translated to Spanish than into English, and others were released in book format first in Spanish and then in French. (Note: For example, "Théorie, pratique théorique et formation théorique. Idéologie et lutte idéologique" was published in Casa de las Americas (Havana), no. 34, 1966, pp. 5–31, but was only translated into English in 1990. The same article was first published in book-form as La filosofía como arma de la revolución in 1968. Some of his articles on the debate over humanism were also only published in Spanish as Polemica sobre Marxismo y Humanismo that same year.) At the turn from the 1960s to the 1970s, Althusser's major works were translated into English—For Marx, in 1969, and Reading Capital in 1970—disseminating his ideas among the English-speaking Marxists.

In the early 1970s, the PCF was, as most of European Communist parties, in a period of internal conflicts on strategic orientation that occurred against the backdrop of the emergence of Eurocommunism. In this context, Althusserian structuralist Marxism was one of the more or less defined strategic lines. Althusser participated in various public events of the PCF, most notably the public debate "Communists, Intellectuals and Culture" ("Les communistes, les intellectuels et la culture") in 1973. He and his supporters contested the party's leadership over its decision to abandon the notion of the "dictatorship of the proletariat" during its twenty-second congress in 1976. The PCF considered that in the European context it was possible to have a peaceful transition to socialism, which Althusser saw as "a new opportunistic version of Marxist Humanism". In a lecture given to the Union of Communist Students in the same year, he criticized above all the form in which this decision was taken. According to Althusser—echoing his notion of "French misery" exposed on For Marx—the party demonstrated a contempt for the materialist theory when it suppressed a "scientific concept". This struggle ultimately resulted in the debacle of the fraction "Union of the Left" and an open letter written by Althusser and five other intellectuals in which they asked for "a real political discussion in the PCF". That same year, Althusser also published a series of articles in the newspaper Le Monde under the title of "What Must Change in the Party". Published between 25 and 28 April, they were expanded and reprinted in May 1978 by François Maspero as the book Ce qui ne peut plus durer dans le parti communiste. Between 1977 and 1978, Althusser mainly elaborated texts criticizing Eurocommunism and the PCF. "Marx in his Limits" ("Marx dans ses limits"), an abandoned manuscript written in 1978, argued that there was no Marxist theory of the state; it was only published in 1994 in the Écrits philosophiques et politiques I. The Italian Communist newspaper Il manifesto allowed Althusser to develop new ideas on a conference held in Venice about "Power and Opposition in Post-Revolutionary Societies" in 1977. His speeches resulted into the articles "The Crisis of Marxism" ("La crisi del marxismo") and "Marxism as a 'finite' theory" in which he stressed "something vital and alive can be liberated by this crisis": the perception of Marxism as a theory that originally only reflected Marx's time and then needed to be completed by a state theory. The former was published as "Marxism Today" ("Marxismo oggi") in the 1978 Italian Enciclopedia Europea. The latter text was included in a book published in Italy, Discutere lo Stato, and he criticized the notion of "government party" and defended the notion of a revolutionary party "out of state".

During the 1970s, Althusser's institutional roles at the ENS increased but he still edited and published his and other works in the series Théorie, with François Maspero. Among the essays published, there was "Response to John Lewis", a 1973 reply of an English Communist's defence of Marxist humanism. In 1975, he concluded his Doctorat d'État (State doctorate) at the University of Picardie and acquired the right to direct research on the basis of his previously published work. Some time after this recognition, Althusser married Hélène Rytmann. In 1976, he compiled several of his essays written between 1964 and 1975 to publish Positions. These years would be a period in which his work was very intermittent; he gave a conference titled "The Transformation of Philosophy" ("La transformation de la philosophie") in two Spanish cities, first Granada and then in Madrid, in March 1976. The same year he gave a lecture in Catalonia titled "Quelques questions de la crise de la théorie marxiste et du mouvement communiste international" ("Some Questions on the Crisis of Marxist Theory and the International Communist Movement") in which Althusser outlined empiricism as the main enemy of class struggle. He also started a rereading of Machiavelli that would influence his later work; he worked between 1975 and 1976 on "Machiavel et nous" ("Machiavelli and Us"), a draft, only published posthumously, based on a 1972 lecture, and also wrote for the National Foundation of Political Science a piece titled "Machiavelli's Solitude" ("Solitude de Machiavel", 1977). In Spring 1976, requested by Léon Chertok to write for the International Symposium on the Unconscious at Tbilisi, he drafted a presentation titled "The Discovery of Dr. Freud" ("La découverte du docteur Freud"). After sending it to Chertok and some friends, he was unsettled by the requested criticism he received by Jacques Nassif and Roudinesco, and then, by December, he wrote a new essay, "On Marx and Freud". He could not attend the event in 1979 and asked Chertok to replace the texts, but Chertok published the first without his consent. This would become a public "affair" in 1984 when Althusser finally noticed it by the time Chertok republished it in a book titled Dialogue franco-soviétique, sur la psychanalyse.

=== Killing of Rytmann and late years: 1978–1990 ===
After the PCF and the left were defeated in the French legislative elections of 1978, Althusser's bouts of depression became more severe and frequent. In March 1980, Althusser interrupted the dissolution session of the École Freudienne de Paris, and, "in the name of the analysts", called Lacan a "beautiful and pitiful harlequin." Later, he went through a hiatal hernia-removal surgery as he had difficulties breathing while eating. According to Althusser himself, the operation caused his physical and mental state to deteriorate; in particular, he developed a persecution complex and suicidal thoughts. He would recall later:

I wanted not only to destroy myself physically but to wipe out all trace of my time on earth: in particular, to destroy every last one of my books and all my notes, and burn the École Normale, and also, "if possible," suppress Hélène herself while I still could.

After the surgery, in May, he was hospitalized for most of the summer in a Parisian clinic. His condition did not improve, but in early October he was sent home. Upon returning, he wanted to get away from ENS and even proposed to buy Roudinesco's house. He and Rytmann were also convinced about the "human decline", and so he tried to talk to the Pope John Paul II through his former professor Jean Guitton. Most of the time, however, he and his wife spent locked in their ENS apartment. In the fall of 1980, Althusser's psychiatrist René Diatkine, who by now was also treating Althusser's wife Hélène Rytmann, recommended that Althusser be hospitalized, but the couple refused.

Before me: Hélène lying on her back, also wearing a dressing gown. ... Kneeling beside her, leaning over her body, I am engaged in massaging her neck. ... I press my two thumbs into the hollow of flesh that borders the top of the sternum, and, applying force, I slowly reach, one thumb toward the right, one thumb toward the left at an angle, the firmer area below the ears. ... Hélène's face is immobile and serene, her open eyes are fixed on the ceiling. And suddenly I am struck with terror: her eyes are interminably fixed, and above all here is the tip of her tongue lying, unusually and peacefully, between her teeth and her lips. I had certainly seen corpses before, but I had never seen the face of a strangled woman in my life. And yet I know that this is a strangled woman. What is happening? I stand up and scream: I've strangled Hélène!

— Althusser, L'avenir dure longtemps

On 16 November 1980, Althusser strangled Rytmann in their ENS room. He himself reported the murder to the doctor in residence, who contacted psychiatric institutions. Even before the police arrival, the doctor and the director of ENS decided to hospitalize him in the Sainte-Anne hospital and a psychiatric examination was conducted on him. Due to his mental state, Althusser was deemed to not understand the charges or the process to which he was to be submitted, so he remained at the hospital. The psychiatric assessment concluded he should not be criminally charged, based on article 64 of the French Penal Code, which stated that "there is neither crime nor delict where the suspect was in a state of dementia at the time of the action". The report said Althusser killed Rytmann in the course of an acute crisis of melancholy, without even realizing it, and that the "wife-murder by manual strangulation was committed without any additional violence, in the course of [an] iatrogenic hallucinatory episode complicated by melancholic depression." As a result, he lost his civil rights, entrusted to a representative of the law, and he was forbidden to sign any documents. In February 1981, the court ruled Althusser as having been mentally irresponsible when he committed the murder, therefore he could not be prosecuted and was not charged. Nonetheless, a warrant of confinement was subsequently issued by the Paris police prefecture; the Ministry of National Education mandated his retirement from the ENS; and the ENS requested his family and friends to clear out his apartment. In June, he was transferred to the L'Eau-Vive clinic at Soisy-sur-Seine.

The murder of Rytmann attracted much media attention, and there were several requests to treat Althusser as an ordinary criminal. The newspaper Minute, journalist Dominique Jamet and Minister of Justice Alain Peyrefitte were among those who accused Althusser of having "privileges" because of the fact he was Communist. From this point of view, Roudinesco wrote, Althusser was three times a criminal. First, the philosopher had legitimated the current of thought judged responsible for the Gulag; second, he praised the Chinese Cultural Revolution as an alternative to both capitalism and Stalinism; and finally because he had, it was said, corrupted the elite of French youth by introducing the cult of a criminal ideology into the heart of one of the best French institutions. Philosopher Pierre-André Taguieff went further on claiming Althusser taught his students to perceive crimes positively, as akin to a revolution. Five years after the murder, a critique by Le Monde's Claude Sarraute would have a great impact on Althusser. She compared his case to the situation of Issei Sagawa, who killed and cannibalized a woman in France, but whose psychiatric diagnosis absolved him. Sarraute criticized the fact that, when prestigious names are involved, a lot is written about them but that little is written about the victim. Althusser's friends persuaded him to speak in his defense, and the philosopher wrote an autobiography in 1985. He showed the result, L'avenir dure longtemps, (Note: Taken from a phrase by Charles de Gaulle, its literal translation is "the future lasts a long time". Several biographers and sources refer to it as The Future Lasts A Long Time. This was the title of the British version published by Chatto & Windus. The US version by The New York Press, however, adopts the title The Future Lasts Forever.) to some of his friends and considered publishing it, but he never sent it to a publisher and locked it in his desk drawer. The book was only published posthumously in 1992.

Despite the critics, some of his friends, such as Guitton and Debray, defended Althusser, saying the murder was an act of love—as Althusser argued too. Rytmann had bouts of melancholy and self-medicated because of this. Guitton said, "I sincerely think that he killed his wife out of love of her. It was a crime of mystical love". Debray compared it to an altruistic suicide: "He suffocated her under a pillow to save her from the anguish that was suffocating him. A beautiful proof of love ... that one can save one's skin while sacrificing oneself for the other, only to take upon oneself all the pain of living". In his autobiography, written to be the public explanation he could not provide in court, Althusser stated that "she matter-of-factly asked me to kill her myself, and this word, unthinkable and intolerable in its horror, caused my whole body to tremble for a long time. It still makes me tremble ... We were living shut up in the cloister of our hell, both of us."

I killed a woman who was everything to me during a crisis of mental confusion, she who loved me to the point of wanting only to die because she could not continue living. And no doubt in my confusion and unconsciousness I 'did her this service,' which she did not try to prevent, but from which she died.

— Althusser, L'avenir dure longtemps

Quebecois author Suzanne Léveillée has written that Rytmann wanted to leave him. Another Quebecois author, Francis Dupuis-Déri, also confirms that idea in an article about how the media dealt handled the murder, and later in a book titled Althusser Assassin.

The crime seriously tarnished Althusser's reputation. As Roudinesco wrote, from 1980, he lived his life as a "specter, a dead man walking". Althusser was forced to live in various public and private clinics until 1983, when he became a voluntary patient. He was able to start an untitled manuscript during this time, in 1982; it was later published as "The Underground Current of the Materialism of the Encounter" ("Le courant souterrain du matérialisme de la rencontre"). From 1984 to 1986, he stayed at an apartment in the north of Paris, where he remained confined most of his time, but he also received visits from some friends, such as philosopher and theologian Stanislas Breton, who had also been a prisoner in the German stalags; from Guitton, who converted him into a "mystic monk" in Roudinesco's words; and from Mexican philosopher Fernanda Navarro during six months, starting from the winter of 1984. Althusser and Navarro exchanged letters until February 1987, and he also wrote a preface in July 1986 for the resulting book, Filosofía y marxismo, a collection of her interviews with Althusser that was released in Mexico in 1988. These interviews and correspondence were collected and published in France in 1994 as Sur la philosophie. In this period he formulated his "materialism of the encounter" or "aleatory materialism", talking to Breton and Navarro about it, that first appeared in Écrits philosophiques et politiques I (1994) and later in the 2006 Verso book Philosophy of the Encounter. In 1987, after Althusser underwent an emergency operation because of the obstruction of the esophagus, he developed a new clinical case of depression. First brought to the Soisy-sur-Seine clinic, he was transferred to the psychiatric institution MGEN in La Verrière. There, following a pneumonia contracted during the summer, he died of a heart attack on 22 October 1990.

While many scholars accept Althusser's defense of mental illness, there are some who are more skeptical. Francis Dupuis-Déri for example argues in Killer Althusser: The Banality of Men that the murder of Hélène Legotien was not an abnormal break, but was a banal example of patriarchal violence against women which was excused by the French intelligentia because of Althusser's status. In an interview Dupuis-Déri explains that his study focuses on "the discursive mechanisms by which we come to excuse the murder of a woman when the murderer is a famous and admired man."

== Personal life ==
=== Romantic life ===
Althusser was such a homebody that biographer William S. Lewis affirmed, "Althusser had known only home, school, and P.O.W. camp" by the time he met his future wife. In contrast, when he first met Rytmann in 1946, she was a former member of the French resistance and a Communist activist. After fighting along with Jean Beaufret in the group "Service Périclès", she joined the PCF. However, she was expelled from the party accused of being a double agent for the Gestapo, for "Trotskyist deviation" and "crimes", which probably referred to the execution of former Nazi collaborators. Although high-ranking party officials instructed him to sever relations with Rytmann, Althusser tried to restore her reputation in the PCF for a long time by making inquiries into her wartime activities. Although he did not succeed in reinserting her into the party, his relationship with Rytmann nonetheless deepened during this period. Their relationship "was traumatic from the outset, so Althusser claims", wrote Elliott. Among the reasons were his almost total inexperience with women and the fact she was eight years older than him.

I had never embraced a woman, and above all I had never been embraced by a woman (at age thirty!). Desire mounted in me, we made love on the bed, it was new, exciting, exalting, and violent. When she (Hélène) had left, an abysm of anguish opened up in me, never again to close.

— Althusser, L'avenir dure longtemps

His feelings toward her were contradictory from the very beginning; it is suggested that the strong emotional impact she caused in him led him to deep depression. Roudinesco wrote that, for Althusser, Rytmann represented the opposite of himself: she had been in the Resistance while he was remote from the anti-Nazi combat; she was a Jew who carried the stamp of the Holocaust, whereas he, despite his conversion to Marxism, never escaped the formative effect of Catholicism; she suffered under Stalinism at the very moment when he was joining the party; and, in opposition to his petit-bourgeois background, her childhood was not prosperous—at the age of 13 she became the sexual abuse victim of a family doctor who, in addition to the abuse, instructed her to give her terminally ill parents a lethal dose of morphine. However, this story could have been invented by Althusser, who admitted to incorporating "imagined memories" into his "traumabiography." According to Roudinesco, she embodied for Althusser his "displaced conscience", "pitiless superego", "damned part", "black animality".

Althusser considered that Rytmann gave him "a world of solidarity and struggle, a world of reasoned action, ... a world of courage". According to him, they performed an indispensable maternal and paternal function for one another: "She loved me as a mother loves a child ... and at the same time like a good father in that she introduced me ... to the real world, that vast arena I had never been able to enter. ... Through her desire for me she also initiated me ... into my role as a man, into my masculinity. She loved me as a woman loves a man!" Roudinesco argued that Rytmann represented for him "the sublimated figure of his own hated mother to whom he remained attached all his life". In his autobiography, he wrote: "If I was dazzled by Hélène's love and the miraculous privilege of knowing her and having her in my life, I tried to give that back to her in my own way, intensely and, if I may put it this way, as a religious offering, as I had done for my mother."

Although Althusser was really in love with Rytmann, he also had affairs with other women. Roudinesco commented that "unlike Hélène, the other women loved by Louis Althusser were generally of great physical beauty and sometimes exceptionally sensitive to intellectual dialogue". She gives as an example of the latter case a woman named Claire Z., with whom he had a long relationship until he was forty-two. They broke up when he met Franca Madonia, a philosopher, translator, and playwright from a well-off Italian bourgeois family from Romagna. Madonia was married to Mino, whose sister Giovanna was married to the Communist painter Leonardo Cremonini. Every summer the two families gathered in a residence in the village of Bertinoro, and, according to Roudinesco, "It was in this magical setting ... that Louis Althusser fell in love with Franca, discovering through her everything he had missed in his own childhood and that he lacked in Paris: a real family, an art of living, a new manner of thinking, speaking, desiring". She influenced him to appreciate modern theatre (Luigi Pirandello, Bertolt Brecht, Samuel Beckett), and, Roudinesco wrote, also on his detachment of Stalinism and "his finest texts (For Marx especially) but also his most important concepts". In her company in Italy in 1961, as Elliott affirmed, was also when he "truly discovered" Machiavelli. Between 1961 and 1965, they exchanged letters and telephone calls, and they also went on trips together, in which they talked about the current events, politics, and theory, as well as made confidences on the happiness and unhappiness of daily life. However, Madonia had an explosive reaction when Althusser tried to make her Rytmann's friend, and sought to bring Mino into their meetings. They nevertheless continued to exchange letters until 1973; these were published in 1998 into an 800-page book Lettres à Franca.

=== Mental condition ===
Althusser underwent psychiatric hospitalisations throughout his life, the first time after receiving a diagnosis of schizophrenia. He suffered from bipolar disorder, and because of it he had frequent bouts of depression that started in 1938 and became regular after his five-year stay in German captivity. From the 1950s onward, he was under constant medical supervision, often undergoing, in Lewis' words, "the most aggressive treatments post-war French psychiatry had to offer", which included electroconvulsive therapy, narco-analysis, and psychoanalysis. Althusser did not limit himself to prescribed medications and practised self-medication. The disease affected his academic productivity; in 1962, he began to write a book about Machiavelli during a depressive exacerbation but was interrupted by a three-months stay in a clinic. The main psychoanalyst he attended was the anti-Lacanian René Diatkine, starting from 1964, after he had a dream about killing his own sister. The sessions became more frequent in January 1965, and the real work of exploring the unconscious was launched in June. Soon Althusser recognized the positive side of non-Lacanian psychoanalysis; although he sometimes tried to ridicule Diatkine giving him lessons in Lacanianism, by July 1966, he considered the treatment was producing "spectacular results". In 1976, Althusser estimated that he had spent fifteen of the previous thirty years in hospitals and psychiatric clinics.

Althusser analysed the prerequisites of his illness with the help of psychoanalysis and found them in complex relationships with his family (he devoted to this topic half of the autobiography). Althusser believed that he did not have a genuine "I", which was caused by the absence of real maternal love and the fact that his father was emotionally reserved and virtually absent for his son. Althusser deduced the family situation from the events before his birth, as told to him by his aunt: Lucienne Berger, his mother, was to marry his father's brother, Louis Althusser, who died in World War I near Verdun, while Charles, his father, was engaged with Lucienne's sister, Juliette. Both families followed the old custom of the levirate, which obliged an older, still unmarried, brother to wed the widow of a deceased younger brother. Lucienne then married Charles, and the son was named after the deceased Louis. In Althusser's memoirs, this marriage was "madness", not so much because of the tradition itself, but because of the excessive submission, as Charles was not forced to marry Lucienne since his younger brother had not yet married her. As a result, Althusser concluded, his mother did not love him, but loved the long-dead Louis. The philosopher described his mother as a "castrating mother" (a term from psychoanalysis), who, under the influence of her phobias, established a strict regime of social and sexual "hygiene" for Althusser and his sister Georgette. His "feeling of fathomless solitude" could only be mitigated by communicating with his mother's parents who lived in Morvan. His relationship with his mother and the desire to deserve her love, in his memoirs, largely determined his adult life and career, including his admission to the ENS and his desire to become a "well-known intellectual". According to his autobiography, ENS was for Althusser a kind of refuge of intellectual "purity" from the big "dirty" world that his mother was so afraid of.

The facts of his autobiography have been critically evaluated by researchers. According to its own editors, L'avenir dure longtemps is "an inextricable tangle of 'facts' and 'phantasies'". His friend and biographer Yann Moulier-Boutang, after a careful analysis of the early period of Althusser's life, concluded that the autobiography was "a re-writing of a life through the prism of its wreckage". Moulier-Boutang believed that it was Rytmann who played a key role in creating a "fatalistic" account of the history of the Althusser family, largely shaping his vision in a 1964 letter. According to Elliott, the autobiography produces primarily an impression of "destructiveness and self-destructiveness". Althusser, most likely, postdated the beginning of his depression to a later period (post-war), having not mentioned earlier manifestations of the disease in school and in the concentration camp. According to Moulier-Boutang, Althusser had a close psychological connection with Georgette from an early age, and although he did not often mention it in his autobiography, her "nervous illness" may have tracked his own. His sister also had depression, and despite their living separately from each other for almost their entire adult lives, their depression often coincided in time. Also, Althusser focused on describing family circumstances, not considering, for example, the influence of ENS on his personality. Moulier-Boutang connected the depression not only with events in his personal life, but also with political disappointments.

== Thought ==
Althusser's earlier works include the influential volume Reading Capital (1965), which collects the work of Althusser and his students in an intensive philosophical rereading of Marx's Capital. The book reflects on the philosophical status of Marxist theory as a "critique of political economy", and on its object. Althusser would later acknowledge that many of the innovations in this interpretation of Marx attempt to assimilate concepts derived from Baruch Spinoza into Marxism. The original English translation of this work includes only the essays of Althusser and Étienne Balibar, while the original French edition contains additional contributions from Jacques Rancière, Pierre Macherey and Roger Establet. A full translation was published in 2016.

Several of Althusser's theoretical positions have remained influential in Marxist philosophy. His essay "On the Materialist Dialectic" proposes a great "epistemological break" between Marx's early writings (1840–44) and his later, properly Marxist texts, borrowing a term from the philosopher of science Gaston Bachelard. His essay "Marxism and Humanism" is a strong statement of anti-humanism in Marxist theory, condemning ideas like "human potential" and "species-being", which are often put forth by Marxists, as outgrowths of a bourgeois ideology of "humanity". His essay "Contradiction and Overdetermination" borrows the concept of overdetermination from psychoanalysis, in order to replace the idea of "contradiction" with a more complex model of multiple causality in political situations (an idea closely related to Antonio Gramsci's concept of cultural hegemony).

Althusser is also widely known as a theorist of ideology. His best-known essay, "Ideology and Ideological State Apparatuses: Notes Toward an Investigation", establishes the concept of ideology. Althusser's theory of ideology draws on Marx and Gramsci, but also on Freud's and Lacan's psychological concepts of the unconscious and mirror-phase respectively, and describes the structures and systems that enable the concept of self. For Althusser, these structures are both agents of repression and inevitable: it is impossible to escape ideology and avoid being subjected to it. On the other hand, the collection of essays from which "Ideology and Ideological State Apparatuses" is drawn contains other essays which confirm that Althusser's concept of ideology is broadly consistent with the classic Marxist theory of class struggle.

Althusser's thought evolved during his lifetime. It has been the subject of argument and debate, especially within Marxism and specifically concerning his theory of knowledge (epistemology).

=== Epistemological break ===
Althusser argues that Marx's thought has been fundamentally misunderstood and underestimated. He fiercely condemns various interpretations of Marx's works—historicism, idealism and economism—on grounds that they fail to realize that with the "science of history", historical materialism, Marx has constructed a revolutionary view of social change. Althusser believes these errors result from the notion that Marx's entire body of work can be understood as a coherent whole. Rather, Marx's thought contains a radical "epistemological break". Although the works of the young Marx are bound by the categories of German philosophy and classical political economy, The German Ideology (written in 1845) makes a sudden and unprecedented departure. This break represents a shift in Marx's work to a fundamentally different "problematic", i.e., a different set of central propositions and questions posed, a different theoretical framework. Althusser believes that Marx himself did not fully comprehend the significance of his own work, and was able to express it only obliquely and tentatively. The shift can be revealed only by a careful and sensitive "symptomatic reading". Thus, Althusser's project is to help readers fully grasp the originality and power of Marx's extraordinary theory, giving as much attention to what is not said as to the explicit. Althusser holds that Marx has discovered a "continent of knowledge", History, analogous to the contributions of Thales to mathematics or Galileo to physics, in that the structure of his theory is unlike anything posited by his predecessors.

Althusser believes that Marx's work is fundamentally incompatible with its antecedents because it is built on a groundbreaking epistemology (theory of knowledge) that rejects the distinction between subject and object. In opposition to empiricism, Althusser claims that Marx's philosophy, dialectical materialism, counters the theory of knowledge as vision with a theory of knowledge as production. On the empiricist view, a knowing subject encounters a real object and uncovers its essence by means of abstraction. On the assumption that thought has a direct engagement with reality, or an unmediated vision of a "real" object, the empiricist believes that the truth of knowledge lies in the correspondence of a subject's thought to an object that is external to thought itself. By contrast, Althusser claims to find latent in Marx's work a view of knowledge as "theoretical practice". For Althusser, theoretical practice takes place entirely within the realm of thought, working upon theoretical objects and never coming into direct contact with the real object that it aims to know. Knowledge is not discovered, but rather produced by way of three "Generalities": (I) the "raw material" of pre-scientific ideas, abstractions and facts; (II) a conceptual framework (or "problematic") brought to bear upon these; and (III) the finished product of a transformed theoretical entity, concrete knowledge. In this view, the validity of knowledge does not lie in its correspondence to something external to itself. Marx's historical materialism is a science with its own internal methods of proof. It is therefore not governed by interests of society, class, ideology, or politics, and is distinct from the superstructure.

In addition to its unique epistemology, Marx's theory is built on concepts—such as forces and relations of production—that have no counterpart in classical political economy. Even when existing terms are adopted—for example, the theory of surplus value, which combines David Ricardo's concepts of rent, profit, and interest—their meaning and relation to other concepts in the theory is significantly different. However, more fundamental to Marx's "break" is a rejection of homo economicus, or the idea held by the classical economists that the needs of individuals can be treated as a fact or "given" independent of any economic organization. For the classical economists, individual needs can serve as a premise for a theory explaining the character of a mode of production and as an independent starting point for a theory about society. Where classical political economy explains economic systems as a response to individual needs, Marx's analysis accounts for a wider range of social phenomena in terms of the parts they play in a structured whole. Consequently, Marx's Capital has greater explanatory power than does political economy because it provides both a model of the economy and a description of the structure and development of a whole society. In Althusser's view, Marx does not merely argue that human needs are largely created by their social environment and thus vary with time and place; rather, he abandons the very idea that there can be a theory about what people are like that is prior to any theory about how they come to be that way.

Although Althusser insists that there was an epistemological break, he later states that its occurrence around 1845 is not clearly defined, as traces of humanism, historicism, and Hegelianism are found in Capital. He claims that only Marx's Critique of the Gotha Programme and some marginal notes on a book by Adolph Wagner are fully free from humanist ideology. In line with this, Althusser replaces his earlier definition of Marx's philosophy as the "theory of theoretical practice" with a new belief in "politics in the field of history" and "class struggle in theory". Althusser considers the epistemological break to be a process instead of a clearly defined event — the product of incessant struggle against ideology. Thus, the distinction between ideology and science or philosophy is not assured once and for all by the epistemological break.

=== Practices ===
Because of Marx's belief that the individual is a product of society, Althusser holds that it is pointless to try to build a social theory on a prior conception of the individual. The subject of observation is not individual human elements, but rather "structure". As he sees it, Marx does not explain society by appealing to the properties of individual persons—their beliefs, desires, preferences, and judgements. Rather, Marx defines society as a set of fixed "practices". Individuals are not actors who make their own history, but are instead the "supports" (Träger) of these practices.

Althusser uses this analysis to defend Marx's historical materialism against the charge that it crudely posits a base (economic level) and superstructure (culture/politics) "rising upon it" and then attempts to explain all aspects of the superstructure by appealing to features of the (economic) base (the well known architectural metaphor). For Althusser, it is a mistake to attribute this economic determinist view to Marx. Just as Althusser criticises the idea that a social theory can be founded on a historical conception of human needs, so does he reject the idea that economic practice can be used in isolation to explain other aspects of society. Althusser believes that the base and the superstructure are interdependent, although he keeps to the classic Marxist materialist understanding of the determination of the base "in the last instance" (albeit with some extension and revision). The advantage of practices over human individuals as a starting point is that although each practice is only a part of a complex whole of society, a practice is a whole in itself in that it consists of a number of different kinds of parts. Economic practice, for example, contains raw materials, tools, individual persons, etc., all united in a process of production.

Althusser conceives of society as an interconnected collection of these wholes: economic practice, ideological practice, and politico-legal practice. Although each practice has a degree of relative autonomy, together they make up one complex, structured whole (social formation). In his view, all practices are dependent on each other. For example, among the relations of production of capitalist societies are the buying and selling of labour power by capitalists and workers respectively. These relations are part of economic practice, but can only exist within the context of a legal system which establishes individual agents as buyers and sellers. Furthermore, the arrangement must be maintained by political and ideological means. From this it can be seen that aspects of economic practice depend on the superstructure and vice versa. For him this was the moment of reproduction and constituted the important role of the superstructure.

=== Contradiction and overdetermination ===
An analysis understood in terms of interdependent practices helps people to conceive of how society is organized, but also permits them to comprehend social change and thus provides a theory of history. Althusser explains the reproduction of the relations of production by reference to aspects of ideological and political practice; conversely, the emergence of new production relations can be explained by the failure of these mechanisms. Marx's theory seems to posit a system in which an imbalance in two parts could lead to compensatory adjustments at other levels, or sometimes to a major reorganization of the whole. To develop this idea, Althusser relies on the concepts of contradiction and non-contradiction, which he claims are illuminated by their relation to a complex structured whole. Practices are contradictory when they "grate" on one another and non-contradictory when they support one another. Althusser elaborates on these concepts by reference to Lenin's analysis of the Russian Revolution of 1917.

Lenin posited that despite widespread discontent throughout Europe in the early 20th century, Russia was the country in which revolution occurred because it contained all the contradictions possible within a single state at the time. In his words, it was the "weakest link in a chain of imperialist states". He explained the revolution in relation to two groups of circumstances: firstly, the existence within Russia of large-scale exploitation in cities, mining districts, etc., a disparity between urban industrialization and medieval conditions in the countryside, and a lack of unity amongst the ruling class; secondly, a foreign policy which played into the hands of revolutionaries, such as the elites who had been exiled by the Tsar and had become sophisticated socialists.

For Althusser, this example reinforces his claim that Marx's explanation of social change is more complex than the result of a single contradiction between the forces and the relations of production. The differences between events in Russia and Western Europe highlight that a contradiction between forces and relations of production may be necessary, but not sufficient, to bring about revolution. The circumstances that produced revolution in Russia were heterogeneous, and cannot be seen to be aspects of one large contradiction. Each was a contradiction within a particular social totality. From this, Althusser concludes that Marx's concept of contradiction is inseparable from the concept of a complex structured social whole. To emphasize that changes in social structures relate to numerous contradictions, Althusser describes these changes as "overdetermined", using a term taken from Sigmund Freud. This interpretation allows people to account for the way in which many different circumstances may play a part in the course of events, and how these circumstances may combine to produce unexpected social changes or "ruptures".

However, Althusser does not mean to say that the events that determine social changes all have the same causal status. While a part of a complex whole, economic practice is a "structure in dominance": it plays a major part in determining the relations between other spheres, and has more effect on them than they have on it. The most prominent aspect of society (the religious aspect in feudal formations and the economic aspect in capitalist formations) is called the "dominant instance", and is in turn determined "in the last instance" by the economy. For Althusser, the economic practice of a society determines which other formation of that society dominates the society as a whole.

Althusser's understanding of contradiction in terms of the dialectic attempts to rid Marxism of the influence and vestiges of Hegelian (idealist) dialectics, and is a component part of his general anti-humanist position. In his reading, the Marxist understanding of social totality is not to be confused with the Hegelian. Where Hegel sees the different features of each historical epoch – its art, politics, religion, etc. – as expressions of a single essence, Althusser believes each social formation to be "decentred", i.e., that it cannot be reduced or simplified to a unique central point.

=== Ideological state apparatuses ===
Because Althusser held that a person's desires, choices, intentions, preferences, judgements, and so forth are the effects of social practices, he believed it necessary to conceive of how society makes the individual in its own image. Within capitalist societies, the human individual is generally regarded as a subject—a self-conscious, "responsible" agent whose actions can be explained by their beliefs and thoughts. For Althusser, a person's capacity to perceive themselves in this way is not innate. Rather, it is acquired within the structure of established social practices, which impose on individuals the role (forme) of a subject. Social practices both determine the characteristics of the individual and give them an idea of the range of properties they can have, and of the limits of each individual. Althusser argues that many roles and activities are acquired and learned by social practice: for example, the production of steelworkers is a part of economic practice, while the production of lawyers is part of politico-legal practice. However, other characteristics of individuals, such as their beliefs about the good life or their metaphysical reflections on the nature of the self, do not easily fit into these categories.

In Althusser's view, values, desires, and preferences are inculcated in by ideological practice, the sphere which has the defining property of constituting individuals as subjects. Ideological practice consists of an assortment of institutions called "ideological state apparatuses" (ISAs), which include the family, the media, religious organizations, and most importantly in capitalist societies, the education system, as well as the received ideas that they propagate. No single ISA produces in people the belief of self-conscious agents. Instead, this belief is derived from learning what it is to be a daughter, a schoolchild, black, a steelworker, a councillor, and so forth.

Despite its many institutional forms, the function and structure of ideology is unchanging and present throughout history; as Althusser states, "ideology has no history". All ideologies constitute a subject, even though he or she may differ according to each particular ideology. Althusser illustrates this with the concept of "hailing" or "interpellation". He describes the process by which ideology "recruits" and "transforms the individuals into subjects."

Althusser compares ideology to a policeman shouting "Hey you there!" toward a person walking on the street. Upon hearing this call, the person responds by turning around and in doing so, is transformed into a subject. The person being hailed recognizes themselves as the subject of the hail, and knows to respond. Althusser calls this recognition a "mis-recognition" (méconnaissance), because it works retroactively: a material individual is always already an ideological subject, even before he or she is born. The "transformation" of an individual into a subject has always already happened; Althusser here acknowledges a debt to Spinoza's theory of immanence.

To highlight this, Althusser offers the example of Christian religious ideology, embodied in the Voice of God, instructing a person on what their place in the world is and what he must do to be reconciled with Christ. From this, Althusser draws the point that in order for that person to identify as a Christian, he must first already be a subject; that is, by responding to God's call and following His rules, he affirms himself as a free agent, the author of the acts for which he assumes responsibility. People cannot recognize themselves outside ideology, and in fact, their very actions reach out to this overarching structure. Althusser's theory draws heavily from Jacques Lacan and his concept of the Mirror Stage—people acquire their identities by seeing themselves mirrored in ideologies.

=== Aleatory materialism ===
In various short papers drafted from 1982 to 1986 and published posthumously, Althusser is critical of the relation of Marxist science to the philosophy of dialectical materialism and materialist philosophy in general. Althusser rejects dialectical materialism and introduces a new concept: the philosophy of the encounter, renamed aleatory materialism in 1986. To develop this idea, Althusser holds that there exists an “underground” or barely recognized philosophical current of aleatory Materialism, articulated by Marx, Democritus, Epicurus, Lucretius, Machiavelli, Spinoza, Hobbes, Rousseau, Montesquieu, Heidegger, Wittgenstein, and Derrida.

He argues that it was an idealist and teleological mistake to think that there are general laws of history and that social relations are determined in the same manner as physical relations. Emphasising the role of contingency in history over laws of development he states that reconstructed historical materialism has as its object complex historical singularities or conjunctures, The conjuncture is the pivotal point, where political practice may intervene, and aleatory materialism is a materialist philosophy to understand this conjuncture.

== Reception and influence ==
While Althusser's writings were born of an intervention against reformist and ecumenical tendencies within Marxist theory, the eclecticism of his influences reflected a move away from the intellectual isolation of the Stalin era. He drew as much from pre-Marxist systems of thought and contemporary schools such as structuralism, philosophy of science and psychoanalysis as he did from thinkers in the Marxist tradition. Furthermore, his thought was symptomatic of Marxism's growing academic respectability, and of a push towards emphasizing Marx's legacy as a philosopher rather than only as an economist or sociologist. Tony Judt saw this as a criticism of Althusser's work, saying he removed Marxism "altogether from the realm of history, politics and experience, and thereby ... render[ed] it invulnerable to any criticism of the empirical sort."

Althusser has had broad influence in the areas of Marxist philosophy and post-structuralism: interpellation has been popularized and adapted by the feminist philosopher and critic Judith Butler, and elaborated further by Göran Therborn; the concept of ideological state apparatuses has been of interest to Slovenian philosopher Slavoj Žižek; the attempt to view history as a process without a subject garnered sympathy from Jacques Derrida; historical materialism was defended as a coherent doctrine from the standpoint of analytic philosophy by G. A. Cohen; the interest in structure and agency sparked by Althusser was to play a role in sociologist Anthony Giddens's theory of structuration.

Althusser's influence is also seen in the work of economists Richard D. Wolff and Stephen Resnick, who have interpreted that Marx's mature works hold a conception of class different from the normally understood ones. For them, in Marx class refers not to a group of people (for example, those that own the means of production versus those that do not), but to a process involving the production, appropriation, and distribution of surplus labour. Their emphasis on class as a process is consistent with their reading and use of Althusser's concept of overdetermination in terms of understanding agents and objects as the site of multiple determinations.

Althusser's work has also been criticized from a number of angles. In a 1971 paper for Socialist Register, Polish philosopher Leszek Kołakowski undertook a detailed critique of structural Marxism, arguing that the concept was seriously flawed on three main points:

I will argue that the whole of Althusser's theory is made up of the following elements: 1. common sense banalities expressed with the help of unnecessarily complicated neologisms; 2. traditional Marxist concepts that are vague and ambiguous in Marx himself (or in Engels) and which remain, after Althusser's explanation, exactly as vague and ambiguous as they were before; 3. some striking historical inexactitudes.

Kołakowski further argued that Althusser, despite his 'verbal claims to "scientificity"', is himself "building a gratuitous ideological project". In 1980, sociologist Axel van den Berg described Kołakowski's critique as "devastating", proving that "Althusser retains the orthodox radical rhetoric by simply severing all connections with verifiable facts".

G. A. Cohen, in his essay 'Complete Bullshit', has cited the 'Althusserian school' as an example of 'bullshit' and a factor in his co-founding the 'Non-Bullshit Marxism Group'. He says that 'the ideas that the Althusserians generated, for example, of the interpellation of the subject, or of contradiction and overdetermination, possessed a surface allure, but it often seemed impossible to determine whether or not the theses in which those ideas figured were true, and, at other times, those theses seemed capable of just two interpretations: on one of them they were true but uninteresting, and, on the other, they were interesting, but quite obviously false'.

Althusser was vehemently attacked by British Marxist historian E. P. Thompson in his book The Poverty of Theory. Thompson claimed that Althusserianism was Stalinism reduced to the paradigm of a theory. Where the Soviet doctrines that existed during the lifetime of the dictator lacked systematisation, Althusser's theory gave Stalinism "its true, rigorous and totally coherent expression". As such, Thompson called for "unrelenting intellectual war" against the Marxism of Althusser.

== Legacy ==
Since his death, the reassessment of Althusser's work and influence has been ongoing. The first wave of retrospective critiques and interventions ("drawing up a balance sheet") began outside of Althusser's own country, France, because, as Étienne Balibar pointed out in 1988, "there is an absolute taboo now suppressing the name of this man and the meaning of his writings." Balibar's remarks were made at the "Althusserian Legacy" Conference organized at Stony Brook University by Michael Sprinker. The proceedings of this conference were published in September 1992 as the Althusserian Legacy and included contributions from Balibar, Alex Callinicos, Michèle Barrett, Alain Lipietz, Warren Montag, and Gregory Elliott, among others. It also included an obituary and an extensive interview with Derrida.

Eventually, a colloquium was organized in France at the University of Paris VIII by Sylvain Lazarus on 27 May 1992. The general title was Politique et philosophie dans l'oeuvre de Louis Althusser, the proceedings of which were published in 1993.

In retrospect, Althusser's continuing influence can be seen through his students. A dramatic example of this points to the editors and contributors of the 1960s journal Cahiers pour l'Analyse: "In many ways, the 'Cahiers' can be read as the critical development of Althusser's own intellectual itinerary when it was at its most robust." This influence continues to guide much philosophical work, as many of these same students became eminent intellectuals in the 1960s, 1970s, 1980s and 1990s: Alain Badiou, Étienne Balibar and Jacques Rancière in philosophy, Pierre Macherey in literary criticism and Nicos Poulantzas in sociology. The prominent Guevarist Régis Debray also studied under Althusser, as did the aforementioned Derrida (with whom he at one time shared an office at the ENS), noted philosopher Michel Foucault, and the pre-eminent Lacanian psychoanalyst Jacques-Alain Miller.

Badiou has lectured and spoken on Althusser on several occasions in France, Brazil, and Austria since Althusser's death. Badiou has written many studies, including "Althusser: Subjectivity without a Subject", published in his book Metapolitics in 2005. Most recently, Althusser's work has been given prominence again through the interventions of Warren Montag and his circle; see for example the special issue of borderlands e-journal edited by David McInerney (Althusser & Us) and "Décalages: An Althusser Studies Journal", edited by Montag. (See "External links" below for access to both of these journals.)

In 2011 Althusser continued to spark controversy and debate with the publication in August of that year of Jacques Rancière's first book, Althusser's Lesson (1974). It marked the first time this groundbreaking work was to appear in its entirety in an English translation. In 2014, On the Reproduction of Capitalism was published, which is an English translation of the full text of the work from which the ISAs text was drawn.

The publication of Althusser's posthumous memoir cast some doubt on his own scholarly practices. For example, although he owned thousands of books, Althusser revealed that he knew very little about Kant, Spinoza, and Hegel. While he was familiar with Marx's early works, he had not read Capital when he wrote his own most important Marxist texts. Additionally, Althusser had "contrived to impress his first teacher, the Catholic theologian Jean Guitton, with a paper whose guiding principles he had simply filched from Guitton's own corrections of a fellow student's essay," and "he concocted fake quotations in the thesis he wrote for another major contemporary philosopher, Gaston Bachelard."

== Selected bibliography ==
=== French books ===
Original French	English translation	Ref.
Montesquieu, la politique et l'histoire (Paris: Presses Universitaires de France, 1959)	"Montesquieu: Politics and History" translation appears in Politics and History: Montesquieu, Rousseau, Marx trans. Ben Brewster (London: New Left Books, 1972), pp. 9–109	
Pour Marx (Paris: François Maspero, September 1965)	For Marx trans. Ben Brewster (London: Allen Lan, 1969)	
Lire 'le Capital' (Paris: François Maspero, November 1965)	Reading Capital trans. Ben Brewster (London: New Left Books, 1970)	
Lénine et la philosophie (Paris: François Maspero, January 1969)	"Lenin and Philosophy" translation appears in Lenin and Philosophy and Other Essays trans. Ben Brewster (London: New Left Books, 1971), pp. 27–68; reprinted in Philosophy and the Spontaneous Philosophy of the Scientists & Other Essays, pp. 167–202	
Réponse à John Lewis (Paris: François Maspero, June 1973)	"Reply to John Lewis (Self-Criticism)" translation appears in Marxism Today trans. Grahame Lock, October 1972, pp. 310–18 and November 1972, pp. 343–9; reprinted (with revisions) in Essays in Self-Criticism trans. Grahame Lock (London: Verso, 1976), pp. 33–99; reprinted in Essays on Ideology trans. Grahame Lock and Ben Brewster (London: Verso 1984), pp. 141–71	
Éléments d'autocritique (Paris: Librairie Hachette, 1974)	"Elements of Self-Criticism" translation appears in Essays in Self-criticism trans. Grahame Lock (London: Verso, 1976), pp. 101–161	
Philosophie et philosophie spontanée des savants (1967) (Paris: François Maspero, September 1974)	"Philosophy and the Spontaneous Philosophy of the Scientists" translation appears in Gregory Elliott ed. Philosophy and the Spontaneous Philosophy of the Scientists trans. Warren Montag (London: Verso, 1990), pp. 69–165	
Positions (1964–1975) (Paris: Éditions Sociales, March 1976)	Not translated	
Ce qui ne peut plus durer dans le parti communiste (Paris: François Maspero, May 1978)	The book itself was not translated, but the original Le Monde articles were translated as "What Must Change in the Party" by Patrick Camiller, in New Left Review, I, no. 109, May–June 1978, pp. 19–45	
L'avenir dure longtemps (Paris: Éditions Stock/IMEC, April 1992)	"The Future Lasts A Long Time" translation appears in The Future Lasts a Long Time and The Facts trans. Richard Veasey (London: Chatto & Windus, 1993) "The Future Lasts Forever" translation appears The Future Lasts Forever: A Memoir trans. Richard Veasey (New York: New Press, 1993)	
Journal de captivité: Stalag XA/1940–1945 (Paris: Éditions Stock/IMEC, September 1992)	Not translated	
Écrits sur la psychanalyse (Paris: Éditions Stock/IMEC, September 1993)	Partially translated as Writings on Psychoanalysis: Freud and Lacan trans. Jeffrey Mehlman (New York: Columbia University Press, 1996)	
Sur la philosophie (Paris: Éditions Gallimard, April 1994)	Not translated	
Écrits philosophiques et politiques II (Paris: Éditions Stock/IMEC, October 1994)	Not translated	
Écrits philosophiques et politiques II (Paris: Éditions Stock/IMEC, October 1995)	Not translated	
Sur la reproduction (Paris: Presses Universitaires de France, October 1995)	On the Reproduction of Capitalism trans. G. M. Goshgarian (London: Verso, 2014)	
Psychanalyse et sciences humaines (Paris: Le Livre de Poche, November 1996)	Not translated	
Solitude de Machiavel et autres textes (Paris: Presses Universitaires de France, October 1998)	"Machiavell's Solitude" was translated by Ben Brewster and appeared in Economy and Society, vol. 17, no. 4, November 1988, pp. 468–79; it was also reprinted in Machiavelli and Us, pp. 115–30	
Politique et Histoire de Machiavel à Marx (Paris: Éditions du Seuil, 2006)	Not translated	
Machiavel et nous (Paris: Ed. Tallandier, 2009)	A draft Althusser kept on his drawer, it was first published in Écrits philosophiques et politiques. It was then published in English as Machiavelli and Us trans. Gregory Elliott (London: Verso, 1999)	
Initiation à la philosophie pour les non-philosophes (Paris: Presses Universitaires de France, January 2014)	Philosophy for Non-Philosophers translated and edited by G.M. Goshgarian with an introduction by Warren Montag (London: Bloomsbury Academic, 2017)	

=== English collections ===
Book	Content	Ref.
The Spectre of Hegel: Early Writings ed. François Matheron; trans. G. M. Goshgarian (London: Verso, 1997)	It translates part of Écrits philosophiques et politiques I and covers some of Althusser's "early writings" (1946–1950) including the "Letter to Jean Lacroix".	
Politics and History: Montesquieu, Rousseau, Marx trans. Ben Brewster (London: New Left Books, 1972)	It collects three texts: 1958's "Montesquieu: Politics and History", pp. 9–109; 1965's "Rousseau: The Social Contract (The Discrepancies)", pp. 111–160; and 1968's "Marx's Relation to Hegel", pp. 161–86	
The Humanist Controversy and Other Texts ed. François Matheron; trans. G. M. Goshgarian (London: Verso, 2003)	1966's "The Theoretical Conjuncture and Marxist Theoretical Research", "On Lévi-Strauss" and "Three Notes on the Theory of Discourses", pp. 1–18, pp. 19–32 and pp. 33–84 respectively; 1967's "On Feuerbach", "The Historical Task of Marxist Philosophy" and "The Humanist Controversy", pp. 85–154, pp. 155–220 and pp. 221–305 respectively	
Philosophy of the Encounter: Later Writings, 1978–1987 ed. François Matheron; trans. G.M. Goshgarian (London: Verso, 2006)	Translation of texts from Écrits philosophiques et politiques 1 and Sur la philosophie, including the latter's preface, 1979's "Marx in his Limits", 1982's "The Underground Current of the Materialism of the Encounter" and 1986's "Portrait of the Materialist Philosopher" and letters to Merab Mamardashvili, Mauricio Malamud and Fernanda Navarro, and his interviews with her	
History and Imperialism: Writings, 1963–1986 translated and edited by G.M. Goshgarian (London: Polity, 2019)	Includes Althusser's unpublished and incomplete book on imperialism	

=== Selected articles in translation ===
- "Our Jean-Jacques Rousseau". Telos 44 (Summer 1980). New York: Telos Press.

== See also ==
- Jean-Louis Baudry
- Charles Bettelheim
- Roy Bhaskar
- Michael Heinrich
- Ernesto Laclau
- Michael Quante
