= Stanislas Breton =

French philosopher and theologian (1912–2007)

Stanislas Breton (3 June 1912 – 2 April 2005) was a French theologian and philosopher. He taught at the École Normale Supérieure in Paris, the Catholic University of Paris and the Catholic University of Lyon.

Stanislas Breton was born in Gradignan, and at the age of fifteen entered the Passionists as a novitiate. His doctoral thesis, under Raymond Aron, was on Nicolaï Hartmann. After teaching at the Pontifical University in Rome in the 1950s, Breton became Professor of Philosophy at the University of Lyons and then at the Catholic University of Paris. In 1970 he was appointed Maître de Conférence at the École Normale Supérieure: nominated by Louis Althusser, he was the first Catholic philosopher to obtain the post.

== Works ==
- L'esse in et l'esse ad dans la métaphysique de la relation, Rome, 1951
- La Passion du Christ et les philosophies, Teramo: Eco, 1954
- Conscience et intentionalité, Paris-Lyon: Vitte, 1956
- Approches phénoménologiques de l'idée dêtre, Paris: E. Vitte, 1959
- Situation de la philosophie contemporaine, Paris: E. Vitte, 1959
- Essence et existence, Paris: Presses universitaires de France, 1962.
- L'être spirituel; recherches sur la philosophie de Nicolaï Hartmann, Lyon: E. Vitte, 1962.
- Mystique de la Passion, Tournai: Desclée, 1962
- Saint Thomas d'Aquin, Paris: Seghers, 1965
- Philosophie et mathématiques chez Proclus, Paris: Beauchesne, 1969
- Du Principe: l'organisation contemporaine de pensable, Paris: Aubier-Montaigne, 1971
- La Foi et raison logique, Paris: Éditions du Seuil, 1971
- Etre, monde, imaginaire, Paris: Seuil, 1976.
- Théorie des idéologies, Paris: Desclée, 1976
- Spinoza: théologie et politique, Paris: Desclée, 1977
- Ecriture et révélation, Paris: Editions du Cerf, 1979
- Le verbe et la croix, Paris: Desclée, 1981. Translated with an introduction by Jacquelyn Porter as The Word and the Cross, New York: Fordham University Press, 2002.
- Unicité et monothéisme, Paris: Éditions du Cerf, 1981.
- Deux mystiques de l'excès: J.-J. Surin et maître Eckhart, Paris: Cerf, 1985.
- Rien ou quelque chose: roman de métaphysique, Paris: Flammarion, 1987
- Poétique du sensible, Paris: Editions du Cerf, 1988
- Saint Paul, Paris: Presses universitaires de France, 1988. Translated by Joseph N. Bellan with an introduction by Ward Blanton as A Radical Philosophy of Saint Paul, New York: Columbia University Press, 2011.
- Matière et dispersion, Grenoble: J. Millon, 1993
- L’avenir du christianisme, Paris: Desclée de Brouwer, 1999
