= Interpellation (philosophy) =

Process by which we encounter a culture's or ideology's values and internalize them

Interpellation is a concept introduced to Marxist theory by Louis Althusser as the mechanism through which pre-existing social structures "constitute" (or construct) individual human organisms as subjects (with consciousness and agency). Althusser asked how people come voluntarily to live within class, gender, racial or other identities, and argued that this happens through "state apparatuses" (such as the family, mass media, schools, churches, the judicial system, police, government) continually telling individuals what they are from infancy. In this way, apparatuses maintain the social order. In Althusser's view, apparatuses call us (or ‘hail’ us, French interpeller) by labels, and we learn to respond to those labels. In this structuralist philosophy, social structures constitute subjects rather than individuals constituting their own subjectivity for themselves.

== Origin of the term ==
The term interpellation is more common in French—the language in which Althusser originally introduced the concept—than in English. It comes from the French verb interpeller, meaning "call out [to someone]," "speak (abruptly) [to get someone's attention, to request something, or to insult someone]." This French verb also has several technical legal senses: to pose questions when interrogating a suspected criminal; to notify someone that one is legally obliged to do something; or a parliamentary summons to someone to account for oneself. Thus in both French and English, the noun interpellation denotes the act of interpellating someone.

== Precursors ==
The German philosophers Theodor Adorno and Max Horkheimer employed a method of analysis similar to Althusser's notion of interpellation in their text Dialectic of Enlightenment, although they did so 26 years before Althusser's "Ideology and Ideological State Apparatuses" was published. Rather than situating their analysis heavily on the State, Adorno and Horkheimer argued that the mass media—the "culture industry"—also plays a role in the construction of passive subjects. So unlike the police officer in Althusser's example who reinforces the ideology of democracy and law, the mass media now plays a powerful complementary role in the creation of a passive consumer. However, whereas Althusser sought to make subjectivity a mere epiphenomenon of institutional interpellation, Adorno and Horkheimer insisted on a concept of subjectivity that was not limited to an institutional definition. They sought to expose tendencies favoring "total administration" over the individual and their subjective potential, while Althusser's analysis seemed only to confirm those tendencies.

== Overview ==
In "Ideology and Ideological State Apparatuses (Notes Towards an Investigation)", Althusser introduces the concepts of ideological state apparatuses (ISAs) and repressive state apparatuses (RSAs), institutions which make up society and which are instrumental to the constant reproduction of the relations of production in that society. While RSAs are institutions that directly repress dissent and opposition (for example, the police and the military), ISAs (for example family, church, schools, the media and politics) reproduce capitalism through non-repressive ideological means. Consequently, interpellation describes the process by which ideology, embodied in major social and political institutions (ISAs and RSAs), constitutes the very nature of individual subjects' identities.

Althusser sees interpellation as an act of "hailing" individuals through social interactions: "all ideology hails or interpellates concrete individuals as concrete subjects"; "ideology 'acts' or 'functions' in such a way that it ... 'transforms' the individual into subjects". For Althusser, interpellation ("hailing") is a non-specific and unconscious process. For example, when a police officer shouts (or hails) "Hey, you there!" and an individual turns around and, so-to-speak, 'answers' the call, the individual becomes a subject. Althusser argues that this is because the individual's internal voice becomes shaped by the hailing that was addressed at him, making him subject to the ideology of democracy and law. Another example is of a friend who knocks on a door. The person inside asks "Who is there?" and only opens the door once the "It's me" from the outside sounds familiar. By doing so, the person inside partakes in "a material ritual practice of ideological recognition in everyday life". In other words, Althusser's central thesis is that "you and I are always already subjects" and are constantly engaging in everyday rituals, like greeting someone or shaking hands, which makes us subject to ideology.

Althusser argued that "there is no ideology except by the subject and for the subject". This notion of subjectivity became central to his thought. According to Althusser, "ideology has always-already interpellated individuals", that is, individuals are constituted as subjects through being interpellated from before they are even born. He further remarks about the individual identity under these conditions:

the individual is interpellated as a (free) subject in order that he shall submit freely to the commandments of the Subject, i.e. in order that he shall (freely) accept his subjection, i.e. in order that he shall make the gestures and actions of his subjection 'all by himself'.

Consequently, individual subjects are presented principally as produced by social forces, rather than acting as powerful independent agents with self-produced identities. Althusser's argument here strongly draws from Jacques Lacan's concept of the mirror stage. However, unlike Lacan who distinguishes between the "I" (i.e., the conscious ego which is created by the mirror stage) and the "subject" (that is, the symbolic subject of the unconscious), Althusser collapses both concepts into one.

== Other applications ==
Althusser's thought has made significant contributions to other French philosophers, notably Derrida, Kristeva, Barthes, Foucault, Deleuze, and Badiou. The feminist scholar and queer theorist Judith Butler critically applied a framework based on interpellation to highlight the social construction of gender identities. Butler argues that by hailing "It's a boy/girl," the newborn baby is ultimately positioned as subject.

Media theorist David Gauntlett argues that "interpellation occurs when a person connects with a media text: when we enjoy a magazine or TV show, for example, this uncritical consumption means that the text has interpellated us into a certain set of assumptions, and caused us to tacitly accept a particular approach to the world."

== Bibliography ==
Key editions and translations of "Idéologie et appareils idéologiques d'État"

- Louis Althusser, 'Idéologie et appareils idéologiques d’État. (Notes pour une recherche)', La Pensée, 151 (1970), 3–38 (original publication).
- Louis Althusser, 'Idéologie et appareils idéologiques d’État. (Notes pour une recherche)', in Positions (1964-1975) (Paris: Les Éditions sociales, 1976), pp. 67–125, ISBN 2209051967 (an influential early reprint).
- Louis Althusser, 'Ideology and Ideological State Apparatuses (Notes towards an Investigation)', trans. by Ben Brewster, in Lenin and Philosophy and Other Essays (London: New Left Press, 1971), pp. 127–86, ISBN 9780902308121 (English translation).
