= Essays in Self-criticism =

1974 book by Louis Althusser

- Cover of the first edition
- Author: Louis Althusser
- Original title: Eléments d'autocritique
- Translator: Grahame Lock
- Language: French
- Subjects: For Marx, Reading Capital
- Published: 1974 (in French); 1976 (in English)
- Publication place: France
- Media type: Print (Hardcover)
- Pages: 224 (English edition)
- ISBN: 978-0391006188

Essays in Self-criticism (French: Eléments d'autocritique) is one of the chief works of the Marxist philosopher Louis Althusser, first published in 1974. An English translation by Grahame Lock was published in 1976.
