= Jean Guitton =

French Catholic philosopher and theologian (1901–1999)

- Born: 18 August 1901; Saint-Étienne, France
- Died: 21 March 1999 (aged 97); Paris, France
- Education: École Normale Supérieure

Jean Guitton (August 18, 1901 – March 21, 1999) was a French Catholic philosopher and theologian. Le Monde called him "the last of the great Catholic philosophers."

== Biography ==
Born in Saint-Étienne, Loire in August 1901, he was the son of Auguste Guitton, a prosperous passementerie industrialist, and Gabrielle Bertrand, both devout Catholics. He studied at the Lycée du Parc in Lyon and was accepted at the École Normale Supérieure in Paris in 1920. His principal religious and intellectual influence was from a blind priest, François Pouget. He finished his philosophical studies in the early 1920s and taught in a number of secondary schools. Guitton was a disciple of philosopher Henri Bergson.

During World War II, he was made a war prisoner by the Nazis. Guitton held university professorships in Montpellier and then Dijon.

On 3 September 1948, at Nice, Guitton married Marie-Louise Honorine Bonnet (Puget-Théniers, Alpes-Maritimes, 22.03.1901 - Nice, 18.01.1974).

In the year 1954, he earned a literary award from the Académie française. From 1955 to 1968 he continued his works as a professor of philosophy at the Sorbonne. He became a member of the Académie française in 1961.

Invited as an observer to the ecumenical council of Vatican II, the first lay person to be granted this honor, he would become a close friend of Pope Paul VI.

He died in Paris at 97 in 1999. During his life, he was also awarded the Great Cross of the National Order of Merit, Commander of the Légion d'Honneur and of the Arts and Letters Medal.

In most of his works Jean Guitton writes about and discusses the agnostic confrontation between human faith and human logic. He wrote around fifty books.

Amongst others, Guitton influenced the Marxist philosopher Louis Althusser, who became a Catholic in his youth.

== Works ==
- Portrait d'une mère (1933)
- Le Temps et l'éternité chez Plotin et Saint Augustin (1933)
- La Philosophie de Leibniz (1933)
- Actualité de saint Augustin (1935)
- La Pensée moderne et le catholicisme (1934-1950)
- Perspectives (1934)
- Newman et Renan (1938)
- La Pensée de M. Loisy (1936)
- Critique de la critique (1937)
- Le Problème de la connaissance et de la pensée religieuse
- Le Problème de Jésus et le fondement du témoignage chrétien (1946)
- Développement des idées dans l'Ancien Testament (1947)
- Portrait de M. Pouget (1941)
- Justification du temps (1941)
- Fondements de la communauté française (1942)
- Journal de captivité 1942-1943 (1942-1943)
- Nouvel art de penser (1946)
- Le Problème de Jésus (1946)
- L'Amour humain (1948)
- L'Existence temporelle (1949)
- La Vierge Marie (1949)
- Pascal et Leibniz (1951)
- Le Travail intellectuel (1951)
- Journal, études et rencontres (1959 et 1968)
- L'Église et l'Évangile (1959)
- La Vocation de Bergson (1960)
- Une mère dans sa vallée (1961)
- Regard sur le concile (1962)
- Génie de Pascal (1962)
- L'Église et les laïcs (1963)
- La conversion de Ratisbonne (1964)
- Le Clair et l'Obscur (1964)
- Dialogues avec Paul VI (1967)
- Développement de la pensée occidentale (1968)
- Profils parallèles (1970)
- Newman et Renan
- Pascal et Leibniz
- Teilhard et Bergson
- Claudel et Heidegger
- Ce que je crois (1971)
- Paul VI et l'Année sainte (1974)
- Écrire comme on se souvient (1974)
- Remarques et réflexions sur l'Histoire (1976)
- Journal de ma vie (1976)
- Évangile et mystère du temps (1977)
- L'Évangile dans ma vie (1978)
- Paul VI secret (1980)
- Le Temps d'une vie (1980)
- Jugements (1981)
- Pages brûlées (1984)
- L'Absurde et le Mystère (1984)
- Portrait de Marthe Robin (1985)
- Œcuménisme (1986)
- Un siècle, une vie(1988), 13th Prix Fondation Pierre-Lafue 1989
- Dieu et la science (with Igor and Grichka Bogdanoff, 1991)
- Portrait du père Lagrange (1992)
- Celui qui croyait au ciel et celui qui n'y croyait pas (with Jacques Lanzmann, 1994)
- Lumen de lumine (1994)
- Le génie de Thérèse de Lisieux (1995)
- Chaque jour que Dieu fait (1996)
- Le Siècle qui s'annonce (1996)
- Mon testament philosophique (1997)
- Ultima Verba (with Gérard Prévost, 1998)
- Le livre de la sagesse et des vertus retrouvées (1998)
