= Lycée du Parc =

Coordinates: 45°46′18″N 4°51′26″E

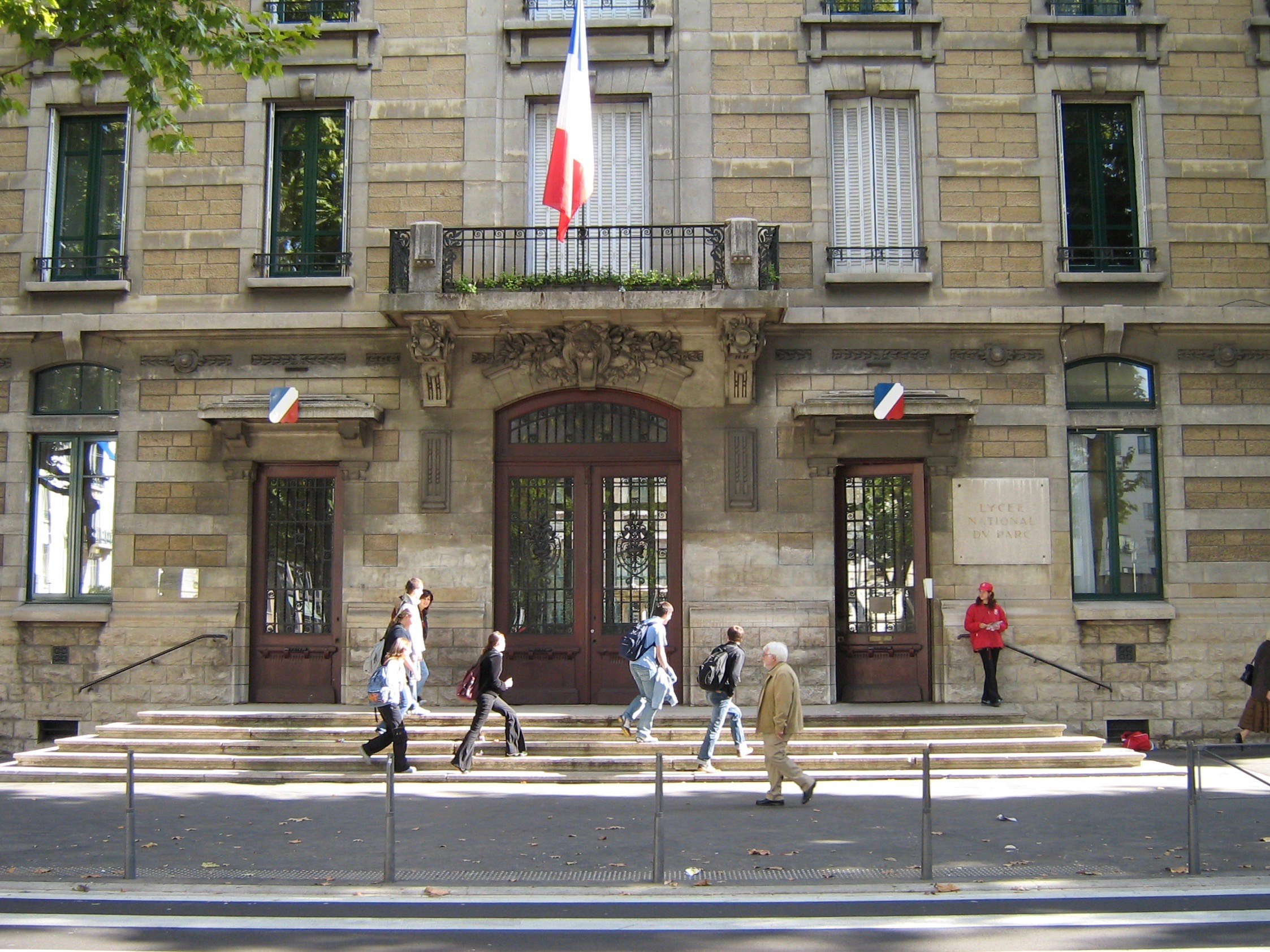

Location
- 1 Boulevard Anatole France; 69458 Lyon; France

Information
- Type: Lycée (Public, Secondary)
- Established: 30 May 1914
- School district: Académie de Lyon
- Principal: Pascal Charpentier
- Faculty: 171
- Gender: Coeducational
- Enrollment: 650
- Website: lyceeduparc.fr

The Lycée du Parc is a public secondary school located in the sixth arrondissement of Lyon, France. Its name comes from the Parc de la Tête d'Or, one of Europe's largest urban parks, which is situated nearby.

It provides a lycée-level education and also offers classes préparatoires, or prépas, preparing students for entrance to the elite Grandes Écoles such as École Polytechnique, CentraleSupélec, École des Mines de Paris, ESSEC Business School, ESCP Business School, and HEC Paris.

The school was built on the site of the former Lunette des Charpennes, part of the Ceintures de Lyon system of fortifications built in the 19th century.

== Famous alumni ==
- Louis Armand
- Louis Althusser
- Nathalie Arthaud
- Louis Bancel
- Christophe Barbier
- Nicolas Baverez
- René Belletto
- Georges Bidault
- Claude Bloch
- Pierre Boutang
- Bertrand Collomb
- Gérard Collomb
- Bruno Cotte
- Antoine Culioli
- Jean-Marie Domenach
- Jacques Friedel
- André Glucksmann
- Jean Guitton
- Jules Horowitz
- Vladimir Jankélévitch
- Jacques Julliard
- Marc Lambron
- Benoît Mandelbrot
- Emmanuel Mounier
- Louis Néel
- Cédric O
- Gilles Pélisson
- Nadia Ramirez
- Jean-François Revel
- Jean Reverzy
- Étienne Roth
- Éric-Emmanuel Schmitt
- Gilbert Simondon
- Jacques Soustelle
- Jean-François Stévenin
- Jean Vuarnet
- Michel Zink
- Stéphane Vaillant

== Famous teachers ==
- Terra Stenberg
- Brad Wilgien
- Jennifer Goodrich

== See also ==
- Secondary education in France
- Education in France
