= Louis Bolk =

Dutch anatomist (1866–1930)

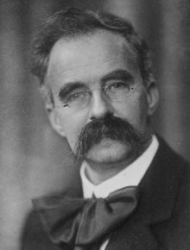
Louis Bolk.

Lodewijk 'Louis' Bolk (10 December 1866, Overschie – 17 June 1930, Amsterdam) was a Dutch anatomist who created the fetalization theory about the human body. It states that when a human being is born, it is still a fetus, as can be seen by its (proportionally) big head, lack of coordination, and helplessness. Furthermore, this "prematuration" is specifically human.

Gavin de Beer and Stephen Jay Gould wrote about him and further developed this theory of neoteny in humans.

Also Jacques Lacan took Bolk's fetalization theory into account in order to introduce his own thesis on the mirror stage.

Bolk wrote in Origin of Racial Characteristics in Man, “White skin...started from an ancestor with a black skin, in whose offspring hair and iris color were suppressed more and more.”

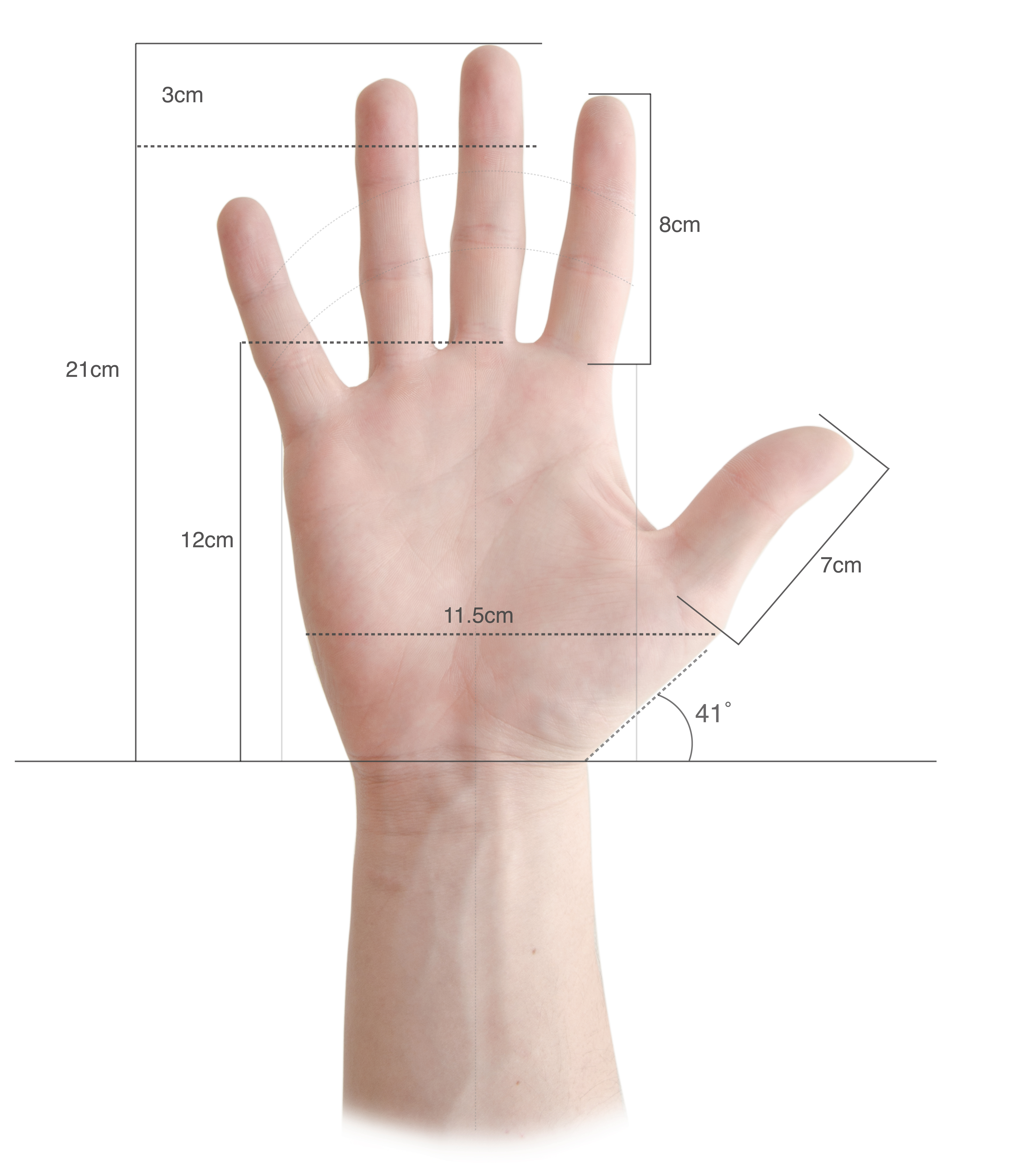
Hand measurements based on the Louis Bolk's fetalization theory
