= Ideology and Ideological State Apparatuses =

1970 essay by Louis Althusser

"Ideology and Ideological State Apparatuses (Notes Towards an Investigation)" (French: "Idéologie et appareils idéologiques d'État (Notes pour une recherche)") is an essay by the French Marxist philosopher Louis Althusser. First published in 1970, it advances Althusser's conception and critique of ideology. Althusser draws upon the works of earlier theorists such as Antonio Gramsci, Sigmund Freud and Jacques Lacan to proffer a more elaborate redefinition of the theory. Althusser's theory of ideology has remained influential since it was written. The essay was intended to be a section of a larger book and was eventually published as a part of "On the Reproduction of Capitalism: Ideology and Ideological State Apparatuses."

== Reproduction of the relations of production ==
Althusser begins the essay by reiterating the Marxist theory that in order to exist, a social formation is required to essentially, continuously and perpetually, reproduce the productive forces (labour power and means of production), the conditions of production, and the relations of production. The reproduction of labour power is ensured by the wage system which pays a minimum amount to the workers so that they appear to work day after day, thereby limiting their vertical mobility. The reproduction of the conditions of production and the reproduction of the relations of production happens through the state apparatuses which are insidious machinations controlled by the capitalist ruling ideology in the context of a class struggle to repress, exploit, extort and subjugate the ruled class.

The Marxist spatial metaphor of the edifice describes a social formation constituted by the foundational infrastructure, i.e. the economic base, on which stands the superstructure consisting of two floors: the law/the state (the politico-legal floor) and ideology. A detailed description of both structures is provided below:

The infrastructure consists of the forces, the means, and the relations of production. The following examples reflect the concept of the infrastructure in further detail:

- The forces included the workers. Also, it consists of the technical knowledge to perform the work, such as training and knowledge.
- The means are the materials of production. This includes the raw materials, tools, and machines.
- The relations of production reflect the interactions between workers as well as between the workers and owners.

The superstructure arises from the infrastructure and consists of culture and ideology. The following examples reflect the concept of the superstructure in further detail:

- The culture includes the laws, politics, art, etc.
- Ideology includes the world views, values, and beliefs

Marx's theory is that the superstructure comes from the infrastructure and reconditions ways of life and living so that the infrastructure continues to be produced.

Althusser extends this topographical paradigm by stating that the infrastructural economic base is endowed with an "index of effectivity" which enables it to ultimately determine the functioning of the superstructure. He scrutinizes this structural metaphor by discussing the superstructure in detail. A close study of the superstructure is necessitated due to its relative autonomy over the base and its reciprocal action on the base.

== Repressive state apparatuses ==
The ruling class uses repressive state apparatuses (RSA) to dominate the working class. The basic, social function of the RSA (government, courts, police and armed forces, etc.) is timely intervention within politics in favour of the interests of the ruling class, by repressing the subordinate social classes as required, using either violent or nonviolent coercive means. The ruling class controls the RSA because they also control the powers of the state (political, legislative, armed).

Althusser has enhanced the Marxist theory of the state by distinguishing the repressive apparatuses of the state from the ideological apparatuses of the state (ISA), which comprise an array of social institutions and multiple, political realities that propagate many ideologies—the religious ISA, the educational ISA, the family ISA, the legal ISA, the political ISA, the communications ISA, the cultural ISA, etc.

The differences between the RSA and the ISA are:

- The repressive state apparatus (RSA) functions as a unified entity (an institution), unlike the ideological state apparatus (ISA), which is diverse in nature and plural in function. What unites the disparate ISA, however, is their ultimate control by the ruling ideology.
- The apparatuses of the state, repressive and ideological, each perform the double functions of violence and ideology. A state apparatus cannot be exclusively repressive or exclusively ideological. The distinction between an RSA and an ISA is its primary function in society: respectively, the administration of violent repression and the dissemination of ideology. In practice, the RSA is the means of repression and violence, and, secondarily, a means of ideology; whereas, the primary, practical function of the ISA is as the means for the dissemination of ideology, and, secondarily, as a means of political violence and repression. The secondary functions of the ISA are effected in a concealed and a symbolic manner.

Moreover, when individual persons and political groups threaten the social order established by the dominant social class, the state invokes the stabilising functions of the repressive state apparatus. As such, the benign forms of social repression affect the judicial system, where ostensibly public contractual language is invoked in order to govern individual and collective behaviour in society. As internal threats (social, political, economic) to the dominant order appear, the state applies proportionate social repression: police suppression, incarceration, and military intervention.

== Ideological state apparatuses ==
Ideological state apparatuses (ISA), according to Althusser, use methods other than physical violence to achieve the same objectives as RSA. They may include educational institutions (e.g. schools), media outlets, churches, social and sports clubs and the family. These formations are ostensibly apolitical and part of civil society, rather than a formal part of the state (i.e. as is the case in an RSA). In terms of psychology they could be described as psychosocial, because they aim to inculcate ways of seeing and evaluating things, events and class relations. Instead of expressing and imposing order, through violent repression, ISA disseminate ideologies that reinforce the control of a dominant class. People tend to be co-opted by fear of social rejection, e.g. ostracisation, ridicule and isolation. In Althusser's view, a social class cannot hold state power unless, and until, it simultaneously exercises hegemony (domination) over and through ISA.

Educational ISA, in particular, assume a dominant role in a capitalist economy, and conceal and mask the ideology of the ruling class behind the "liberating qualities" of education, so that the hidden agendas of the ruling class are inconspicuous to most teachers, students, parents and other interested members of society. Althusser said that the school has supplanted the church as the crucial ISA for indoctrination, which augments the reproduction of the relations of production (i.e. the capitalist relations of exploitation) by training the students to become sources of labour power, who work for and under capitalists.

However, because ISA cannot dominate as obviously or readily as RSA, ideological state apparatuses may themselves become a site of class struggle. That is, subordinate social classes are able to find the means and occasions to express class struggle politically and in so doing counter the dominant class, either by utilizing ideological contradictions inherent in ISA, or by campaigns to take control of positions within the ISA. This, nevertheless, will not in itself prevent the dominant class from retaining its position in control of RSA.

== Two theses on ideology ==
Althusser advances two theses on ideology: "Ideology represents the imaginary relationship of individuals to their real conditions of existence"; and "Ideology has a material existence".

The first thesis tenders the familiar Marxist contention that ideologies have the function of masking the exploitative arrangements on which class societies are based. Where Althusser's theory differs from the conception of ideology held by previous Marxists, is that it sees ideology as a permanent medium of delusion that must exist to bind men together into society. Even in a classless society, ideology is needed to give social cohesion, to constitute individuals as imaginary subjects.

The second thesis posits that ideology does not exist in the form of "ideas" or conscious "representations" in the "minds" of individuals. Rather, ideology consists of the actions and behaviours of bodies governed by their disposition within material apparatuses. Central to the view of individuals as responsible subjects is the notion of an explanatory link between belief and action, that

every 'subject' endowed with a 'consciousness' and believing in the 'ideas' that his 'consciousness' inspires in him and freely accepts, must act according to his ideas, must therefore inscribe his own ideas as a free subject in the actions of his material practice.

For Althusser, this is yet another effect of social practice:

I shall therefore say that, where only a single subject (such and such individual) is concerned, the existence of the ideas of his belief is material in that his ideas are his material actions inserted into his material practices governed by material rituals which are themselves defined by the material ideological apparatus from which we derive the ideas of that subject...Ideas have disappeared as such (insofar as they are endowed with an ideal or spiritual existence), to the precise extent that it has emerged that their existence is inscribed in the actions of practices governed by rituals defined in the last instance by an ideological apparatus. It therefore appears that the subject acts insofar as he is acted by the following system (set out in the order of its real determination): ideology existing in a material ideological apparatus, describing material practices governed by a material ritual, which practices exist in the material actions of a subject acting in all consciousness according to his belief.

== Interpellation ==
Althusser uses the term "interpellation" to describe the process by which ideology constitutes individual persons as subjects. According to Althusser, the obviousness that people (you and I) are subjects is an effect of ideology. Althusser believes that there are two functions of interpellation. One function of ideology is "recognition" and the other function, its inverse, is "misrecognition". Below are a few concrete illustrations that Althusser provides to further explain the two functions:

1. When a friend of yours knocks on your door, you ask "Who's there?" The answer, since it is obvious, is "it's me". Once you recognize that "it is him or her", you open to the door. After opening the door, you see that it truly is he or she who is there.
2. Another illustration reflects Althusser's idea of reconnaissance. When recognizing a familiar face on the street in France, for example, you show him that you have recognized him and that he has recognized you by saying "Hello, my friend". You also shake his hand when speaking. The handshake represents a material ritual practice of ideological recognition in the everyday life of France. Other locations across the world may have different rituals.

Ideological social and political institutions "hail" the individual in social interactions, giving the individual his or her identity. Althusser compares ideology to a policeman shouting "hey you" to a person walking in the street. The person responds to the call and in doing so is transformed into a subject—a self-conscious, responsible agent whose actions can be explained by his or her thoughts. Althusser thus goes against the classical definition of the subject as cause and substance, emphasising instead how the situation always precedes the (individual or collective) subject. Concrete individual persons are the carriers of ideology—they are "always-already interpellated" as subjects. Individual subjects are presented principally as produced by social forces, rather than acting as powerful independent agents with self-produced identities. Althusser's argument here strongly draws from Jacques Lacan's concept of the mirror stage—we acquire our identities by seeing ourselves somehow mirrored in ideologies.

As a further example, Althusser depicts Christian religious ideology, embodied in the Voice of God, instructing a person on what his place in the world is and what he must do to be reconciled with Christ. Althusser draws the point that in order for that person to identify himself as a Christian, he must first already be a subject; that is, by responding to God's call and following His rules, he affirms himself as a free agent, the author of the acts for which he assumes responsibility. Individuals cannot recognize themselves outside of ideology, Slavoj Zizek would later summarize Althusser's position as being "the thesis that the idea of the possible end of ideology is an ideological idea par excellence."

== Reception ==
Generally, Althusser's perspectives on ideology remain respected; in the Louis Althusser capsule biography, the Norton Anthology of Theory and Criticism, 2nd. Ed., says that "Althusser's major concepts—Ideological State Apparatuses, Interpellation, Imaginary relations, and Overdetermination—permeate the discourse of contemporary literary and cultural theory, and his theory of ideology has influenced virtually all subsequent serious work on the topic."

A critique of Althusser's concepts of ideology, and the more broad-based Gramsci-inspired turn in postwar Marxism since the Second World War has been provided by Vivek Chibber, arguing instead that 'resignation' is the driving force behind worker's lack of militancy during periods of capitalist dominance, de-emphasising the role placed on ideology by Althusser and like-minded academics.

== Key editions and translations ==
- Louis Althusser, 'Idéologie et appareils idéologiques d’État. (Notes pour une recherche)', La Pensée, 151 (1970), 3–38 (original publication)
- Louis Althusser, 'Idéologie et appareils idéologiques d’État. (Notes pour une recherche)', in Positions (1964-1975) (Paris: Les Éditions sociales, 1976), pp. 67–125, ISBN 2209051967 (an influential early reprint)
- Louis Althusser, 'Ideology and Ideological State Apparatuses (Notes towards an Investigation)', trans. by Ben Brewster, in Lenin and Philosophy and Other Essays (London: New Left Press, 1971), pp. 127–86, ISBN 9780902308121 (English translation)

== See also ==
- Critique of ideology
- Screen theory
