= Overdetermination =

When a single effect has multiple sufficient causes

Overdetermination occurs when a single observed effect is determined by multiple causes, any one of which alone would be conceivably sufficient to account for ("determine") the effect. The term "overdetermination" (German: Überdeterminierung) was used by Sigmund Freud as a key concept in his psychoanalysis, and later by Louis Althusser.

In the philosophy of science, the concept of overdetermination has been used to describe a situation in which there are more causes present than are necessary to instantiate an effect. Overdetermination here is in contrast to underdetermination, when the number or strength of causes is insufficient.

== Classical Greek psychology ==
Classical Greek history and literature could deploy a form of overdetermination or "double determination" to allow both for divine intervention and for human action.

== Freud and psychoanalysis ==
Freud wrote in The Interpretation of Dreams that many features of dreams were usually "overdetermined," in that they were caused by multiple factors in the life of the dreamer, from the "residue of the day" (superficial memories of recent life) to deeply repressed traumas and unconscious wishes, these being "potent thoughts". Freud favored interpretations which accounted for such features not only once, but many times, in the context of various levels and complexes of the dreamer's psyche.

The concept was later borrowed for a variety of other realms of thought.

== Richards and literature ==
The New Critic I. A. Richards appealed to Freud's idea of overdetermination while explaining why what Richards called a 'context theorem of meaning' showed the importance of ambiguity in rhetoric, the philosophy of language, and literary criticism:

Freud taught us that a dream may mean a dozen different things; he has persuaded us that some symbols are, as he says, 'over-determined' and mean many different selections from among their causes. This theorem goes further, and regards all discourse – outside the technicalities of science – as over-determined, as having multiplicity of meaning.

== Althusser and structuralist Marxism ==
The Marxist philosopher Louis Althusser imported the concept into Marxist political theory in an influential essay, "Contradiction and overdetermination." Drawing from both Freud and Mao Zedong, Althusser used the idea of overdetermination as a way of thinking about the multiple, often opposed, forces active at once in any political situation, without falling into an overly simple idea of these forces being simply "contradictory." Translator Ben Brewster, in his glossary to Reading Capital defines Althusser's notion of overdetermination as describing

"the effects of the contradictions in each practice constituting the social formation on the social formation as a whole, and hence back on each practice and each contradiction, defining the pattern of dominance and subordination, antagonism and non-antagonism of the contradictions in the structure in dominance at any given historical moment. More precisely, the overdetermination of a contradiction is the reflection in it of its conditions of existence within the complex whole, that is, of the other contradictions in the complex whole, in other words its uneven development."

== In analytic philosophy ==
In contemporary analytic philosophy, an event or state of affairs is said to be overdetermined if it has two or more distinct, sufficient causes. In the philosophy of mind, the famous case of overdetermination is called mental-physical causal overdetermination. If we accept that a mental state (M) is realized by a physical state (P), and M can cause another mental state (M*) or another physical state (P*), then, nomologically speaking, P can also cause M* or P*. In this way, M* or P* would be determined by both M and P. In other words, both M* and P* are overdetermined. Since either M or P is sufficient for M* or P*, the problem of mental-physical causal overdetermination is the causal redundancy.

Whereas there may unproblematically be recognised many different necessary conditions of the event's occurrence, no two distinct events may lay claim to be sufficient conditions, since this would lead to overdetermination. A much-used example is that of a firing squad, whose members simultaneously fire at and 'kill' their target. Apparently, no one member can be said to have caused the victim's death, since they would have been killed anyway. Another example is that Billy and Suzy each throw a rock through a window, and either rock alone could have shattered the window. In this case, similar to the example of firing squads, Billy and Suzy together shatter the window and the result is not overdetermined. Or, we can say, even if these two examples are a kind of overdetermination, this kind of overdetermination is benign.

There are many problems of overdetermination. First, overdetermination is problematic from the viewpoint of a standard counterfactual understanding of causation, according to which an event is the cause of another event if and only if the latter would not have occurred, had the former not occurred. In order to apply this formula to actual complex situations, implicit or explicit conditions need to be accepted as being circumstantial, since the list of counterfactually acceptable causes would otherwise be impractically long (e.g. the Earth's continued existence could be said to be a (necessary) cause of one drinking one's coffee). Unless a circumstance-clause is included, the putative cause to which one wishes to draw attention could never be considered sufficient, and hence not comply with the counterfactual analysis. Second, overdetermination is problematic in that we do not know how to explain where the extra causation "comes from" and "goes". This makes overdetermination mysterious.

== See also ==
- Fallacy of the single cause
- Multivariate statistics
- Occam's razor
- Open systems
- Parametric determinism
