= Mirror stage =

Psychoanalytic concept

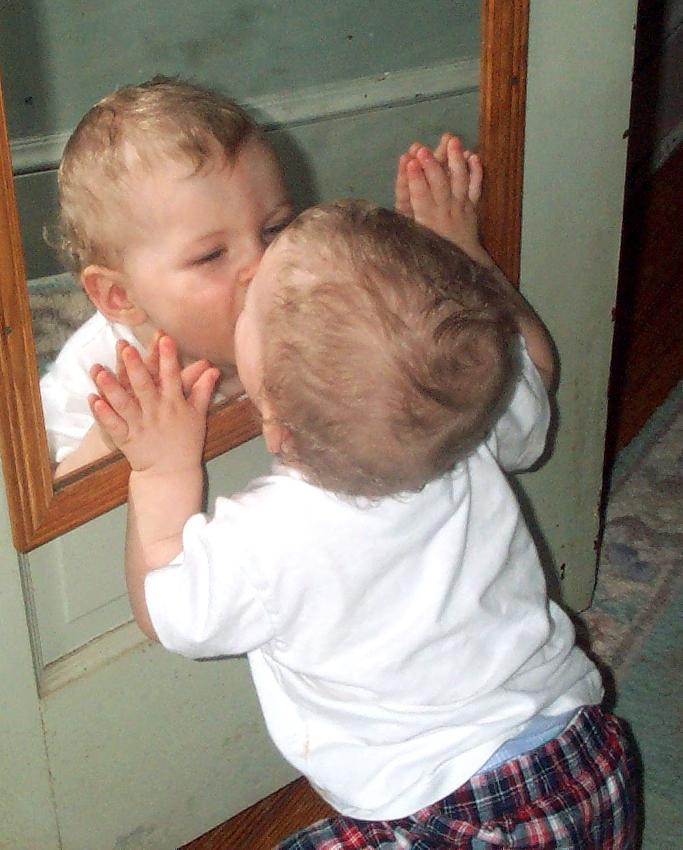
A toddler and a mirror

The mirror stage (French: stade du miroir) is a concept in the psychoanalytic theory of Jacques Lacan. The mirror stage is based on the belief that infants recognize themselves in a mirror (literal) or other symbolic contraption which induces apperception (the turning of oneself into an object that can be viewed by the child from outside themselves) from the age of about six months.

Initially, Lacan proposed that the mirror stage was part of an infant's development from 6 to 18 months, as outlined at the Fourteenth International Psychoanalytical Congress at Marienbad in 1936. By the early 1950s, Lacan's concept of the mirror stage had evolved: he no longer considered the mirror stage as a moment in the life of the infant, but as representing a permanent structure of subjectivity, or as the paradigm of "Imaginary order". This evolution in Lacan's thinking becomes clear in his later essay titled "The Subversion of the Subject and the Dialectic of Desire".

== History of development ==
Lacan's concept of the mirror stage was strongly inspired by earlier work by psychologist Henri Wallon, who speculated based on observations of animals and humans responding to their reflections in mirrors. Wallon noted that by the age of about six months, human infants and chimpanzees both seem to recognize their reflection in a mirror. While chimpanzees rapidly lose interest in the discovery, human infants typically become very interested and devote much time and effort to exploring the connections between their bodies and their images. In a 1931 paper, Wallon argued that mirrors helped children develop a sense of self-identity. However, later mirror test research indicates that while toddlers are usually fascinated by mirrors, they do not actually recognize themselves in mirrors until the age of 15 months at the earliest, leading psychoanalytically trained critic Norman N. Holland to declare that "there is no evidence whatsoever for Lacan's notion of a mirror stage". Similarly, physician Raymond Tallis notes that a literal interpretation of the Lacanian mirror stage contradicts empirical observations about human identity and personality: "If epistemological maturation and the formation of a world picture were dependent upon catching sight of oneself in a mirror, then the [mirror stage] theory would predict that congenitally blind individuals would lack selfhood and be unable to enter language, society or the world at large. There is no evidence whatsoever that this implausible consequence of the theory is borne out in practice."

Wallon's ideas about mirrors in infant development were distinctly non-Freudian and little-known until revived in modified form a few years later by Lacan. As Evans writes, "Lacan used this observation as a springboard to develop an account of the development of human subjectivity that was inherently, though often implicitly, comparative in nature." Lacan attempted to link Wallon's ideas to Freudian psychoanalysis, but was met with indifference from the larger community of Freudian psychoanalysts. Richard Webster explains how the "complex, and at times impenetrable paper ... appears to have made little or no lasting impression on the psychoanalysts who first heard it. It was not mentioned in Ernest Jones's brief account of the congress and received no public discussion."

In the 1930s, Lacan attended seminars by Alexandre Kojève, whose philosophy was heavily influenced by Hegel. The diachronic structure of the mirror stage theory is influenced by Kojève's interpretation of the master–slave dialectic. Lacan continued to refine and modify the mirror stage concept through the remainder of his career; see below.

Dylan Evans argues that Lacan's earliest versions of the mirror stage, while flawed, can be regarded as a bold pioneering in the field of ethology (the study of animal behavior) and a precursor of both cognitive psychology and evolutionary psychology. In the 1930s, zoologists were increasingly interested in the then-new field of ethology, but not until the 1960s would the larger scientific community believe that animal behaviour offered any insights into human behaviour.

However, Evans also notes that by the 1950s Lacan's mirror stage concept had become abstracted to the point that it no longer required a literal mirror, but could simply be the child's observation of observed behaviour in the imitative gestures of another child or elder.

== Self-alienation ==
The child's initiation into what Jacques Lacan would call the "mirror stage" entails a "libidinal dynamism" caused by the young child's identification with its own image and creation of what Lacan terms the "Ideal-I" or "Ideal ego". This reflexivity inherent in fantasy is apparent in the mirror stage, since to recognize oneself as "I" is like recognizing oneself as other ("yes, that person over there is me"); this act is thus fundamentally self-alienating. Indeed, for this reason feelings towards the image are mixed, caught between hatred ("I hate that version of myself because it is so much better than me") and love ("I want to be like that image"). A type of repetition compulsion develops from this vacillation as the attempt to locate a fixed subject proves ever elusive. "The mirror stage is a drama...which manufactures for the subject, caught up in the lure of spatial identification, the succession of phantasies that extends from a fragmented body-image to a form of its totality." This misrecognition (seeing an ideal-I where there is a fragmented, chaotic body) subsequently "characterizes the ego in all its structures."

== As phenomenon ==
The mirror stage is a phenomenon to which I assign a twofold value. In the first place, it has historical value as it marks a decisive turning-point in the mental development of the child. In the second place, it typifies an essential libidinal relationship with the body image. (Lacan, Some reflections on the Ego, 1953)

As Lacan further develops the mirror stage concept, the stress falls less on its historical value and ever more on its structural value. "Historical value" refers to the mental development of the child and "structural value" to the libidinal relationship with the body image. In Lacan's fourth Seminar, La relation d'objet, he states that "the mirror stage is far from a mere phenomenon which occurs in the development of the child. It illustrates the conflictual nature of the dual relationship". The dual relationship (relation duelle) refers not only to the relation between the Ego and the body, which is always characterized by illusions of similarity and reciprocity, but also to the relation between the Imaginary and the Real. The visual identity given from the mirror supplies imaginary "wholeness" to the experience of a fragmentary real. See Lacan's paper, "The Mirror Stage as formative of the function of the I as revealed in psychoanalytic experience", the first of his Écrits.

The mirror stage describes the formation of the Ego via the process of identification, the Ego being the result of identifying with one's own specular image. At six months the baby still lacks coordination (see Louis Bolk); however, Lacan hypothesized that the baby can recognize itself in the mirror before attaining control over its bodily movements. The child sees its image as a whole, but this contrasts with the lack of coordination of the body and leads the child to perceive a fragmented body. This contrast, Lacan hypothesized, is first felt by the infant as a rivalry with its own image, because the wholeness of the image threatens it with fragmentation; thus the mirror stage gives rise to an aggressive tension between the subject and the image. To resolve this aggressive tension, the subject identifies with the image: this primary identification with the counterpart is what forms the Ego. (Evans, 1996) The moment of identification is to Lacan a moment of jubilation since it leads to an imaginary sense of mastery. (Écrits, "The Mirror Stage") Yet, the jubilation may also be accompanied by a depressive reaction, when the infant compares his own precarious sense of mastery with the omnipotence of the mother. (La relation d'objet) This identification also involves the ideal ego which functions as a promise of future wholeness sustaining the Ego in anticipation.

The mirror stage, Lacan also hypothesized, shows that the Ego is the product of misunderstanding – Lacan's term "méconnaissance" implies a false recognition. Additionally, the mirror stage is where the subject becomes alienated from itself, and thus is introduced into the Imaginary order.

The Mirror Stage has also a significant symbolic dimension. The Symbolic order is present in the figure of the adult who is carrying the infant: the moment after the subject has jubilantly assumed his image as his own, he turns his head toward this adult who represents the big Other, as if to call on him to ratify this image. (Tenth Seminar, "L'angoisse", 1962–1963)

== See also ==
- Interpellation (philosophy)
- Mirror test
- Self-consciousness
- The Mirror of Production – 1973 book by Jean Baudrillard
