= 20th-century French philosophy =

20th-century French philosophy is a strand of contemporary philosophy generally associated with post-World War II French thinkers, although it is directly influenced by previous philosophical movements.

== Bergson ==
The work of Henri Bergson (1859–1941) is often considered the division point between nineteenth- and twentieth-century French philosophy. Essentially, despite his respect for mathematics and science, he pioneered the French movement of scepticism towards the use of scientific methods to understand human nature and metaphysical reality. Positivism, which, for instance, the French sociologist Durkheim was interested in at the time, was not appropriate, he argued. Unlike later philosophers, Bergson was highly influenced by biology, particularly Darwin's Origin of Species, which was published in the year Bergson was born. This led Bergson to discuss the 'Body' and 'Self' in detail, arguably prompting the fundamental ontological and epistemological questions to be raised later in the 20th century. Bergson's work was a major influence on Gilles Deleuze, who wrote a monograph on him (Bergsonism, 1966) and whose philosophical analyses of cinema (Cinema 1: The Movement Image and Cinema 2: The Time-Image) develop his ideas.

== Philosophy of science ==
Following debates concerning the foundation of mathematics around the mathematician and philosopher Henri Poincaré (1854–1912), who opposed Bertrand Russell and Frege, various French philosophers started working on philosophy of science, among them Gaston Bachelard, who developed a discontinuous view of scientific progress, Jean Cavaillès (1903–1944), Jules Vuillemin (1920-2001), or Georges Canguilhem, who would be a strong influence of Michel Foucault; in his introduction to Canguilhem's The Normal and the Pathological, Foucault wrote:

Take away Canguilhem and you will no longer understand much about Althusser, Althusserism and a whole series of discussions which have taken place among French Marxists; you will no longer grasp what is specific to sociologists such as Bourdieu, Robert Castel, Jean-Claude Passeron and what marks them so strongly within sociology; you will miss an entire aspect of the theoretical work done by psychoanalysts, particularly by the followers of Lacan. Further, in the entire discussion of ideas which preceded or followed the movement of '68, it is easy to find the place of those who, from near or from afar, had been trained by Canguilhem.

Starting in the 1980s, Bruno Latour (1947-2022), teacher at the engineering school École nationale supérieure des mines de Paris, would develop the actor-network theory, a distinctive approach to social theory and research, best known for its controversial insistence on the agency of nonhumans.

== The Sorbonne ==
Many philosophers and historians of philosophy were teachers at the Sorbonne, the University of Paris, including Léon Brunschvicg (1869–1944), co-founder of the Revue de Métaphysique et de Morale with Xavier Léon and Elie Halévy, Martial Guéroult (1891–1976) and successor of Étienne Gilson at the Collège de France in 1951, Ferdinand Alquié, Paul Ricœur, etc. Jean Wahl taught between 1936 and 1967 and helped introduce the philosophy of Søren Kierkegaard to French thinkers.

== Personalism ==
Emmanuel Mounier (1905–1950) was a guiding spirit in the French personalist movement, and founder and director of Esprit, the magazine which was the organ of the movement. Mounier, who was the child of peasants, was a brilliant scholar at the Sorbonne. In 1929, when he was only twenty-four, he came under the influence of the French writer, Charles Péguy, to whom he ascribed the inspiration of the personalist movement.

Gabriel Honoré Marcel (1889–1973) was a leading Catholic existentialist and the author of about 30 plays. He shared a great deal in common with Mounier's ideas. They both show Bergson's influence in their assessment of 'being', specifically the Mystery of Being. Interest of Mounier and Marcel in the problems of technology moved French philosophy forward.

== Jean-Paul Sartre and Existentialism ==
Jean-Paul Sartre (1905–1980) was, if only by birth, the first truly 20th-century French philosopher. He was also well-known as a dramatist, screenwriter, novelist and critic. Sartre popularized (and named) existentialism, making it better known to the lay-person than, for instance, deconstruction. Phenomenology and Marxism were two other key concerns of his. A leading figure of the French Left, Sartre was opposed on his right by Raymond Aron.

== Merleau-Ponty ==
Maurice Merleau-Ponty (1908–1961) was a French phenomenologist philosopher, strongly influenced by Edmund Husserl. Merleau-Ponty is classified as an existentialist thinker because of his close association with Jean-Paul Sartre and Simone de Beauvoir, and his distinctly Heideggerian conception of Being.

== Marxist philosophers ==
It is important to realise that, as well as holding many varying degrees and interpretations of Marxism, many French Philosophers' views on it shifted substantially during their lifetime. Sartre, for instance, became more influenced by Marx during the course of his life.

Alexandre Kojève (1902–1968) was a Marxist and Hegelian political philosopher, who had a substantial influence on intellectual life in France in the 1930s and on the reading of Hegel in France.

Louis Althusser (1918–1990) was a key Marxist philosopher, sometimes considered to be the structuralist equivalent to Marxism that Lacan was to Psychoanalysis and Claude Lévi-Strauss to ethnology (although all of them rejected the identification). In 'Lenin and Philosophy', Althusser explained Lenin's differentiation between Dialectical Materialism and Historical Materialism. He said the former was the philosophy and the latter was the science, and claimed that in history science has always preceded Philosophy. One of his seminal works was Reading Capital (1965), co-written with Étienne Balibar, Roger Establet, Jacques Rancière and Pierre Macherey. He opposed Hegel's teleological approach to history, drew on Bachelard's concept of "epistemological break" and defined philosophy as "class struggle in theory."

== Structuralism ==
The structuralist movement in French philosophy was highly influenced by the Swiss thinker Ferdinand de Saussure (1857–1913). His ideas laid the foundation for many of the significant developments in linguistics in the 20th century. He is widely considered the 'father' of 20th-century linguistics.

This current was further explored by Claude-Levi Strauss in ethnology. His work influenced important figures like Jacques Derrida and Jacques Lacan significantly. From 1963, a magazine was run in Paris, called Tel Quel, which also dabbled excessively in structuralist analysis of texts. Important figures in this endeavour were Phillip Sollers, the magazine's editor, Julia Kristeva and Roland Barthes.

Jacques Lacan (1901–1981) was specifically interested in the philosophy of psychoanalysis. He could be said to be relevant to the more modern foundations of discursive psychology.

== Post-structuralism ==
Post-structuralism is, like structuralism, an ambiguous term in some respect. It is first important to understand the nature of the schools of thought - as often it seems they aren't truly separate 'schools' at all. Much like Sartre's interest in art, both of these movements are important to a wide range of academic disciplines. E.g., English literature, cultural studies, media studies/film studies, anthropology, etc. etc.

Michel Foucault (1926–1984), although sometimes considered close to structuralism, quickly drew apart from this movement, developing a specific approach to semiology and history which he dubbed "archeology." His influence is broad-ranging, and his work includes books such as Madness and Civilization (1961), The Order of Things (1966), Discipline and Punish: The Birth of Prison (1975) or The History of Sexuality.

Gilles Deleuze, who wrote Anti-Oedipus (1972) with Félix Guattari, criticizing psychoanalysis, was, like Foucault, one of the key thinkers who introduced a thorough reading of Nietzsche in France, following Georges Bataille's early attempts — Bataille published the Acéphale review from 1936 to 1939, along with Pierre Klossowski, another close reader of Nietzsche, Roger Caillois and Jean Wahl. Deleuze wrote books such as Difference and Repetition, The Logic of Sense, Spinoza: Practical Philosophy (1970), and also wrote on Bergson, Leibniz, Nietzsche, etc., as well as other works on cinema (Cinema 1: The Movement Image). Both Deleuze and Foucault attempted to take distance from the strong influence of Marxism and psychoanalysis in their works, in part by means of a radical reinterpretation of Marx and Freud.

Jacques Derrida (1930–2004) was an Algerian-born French philosopher, known as the founder of deconstruction. His voluminous work had a profound impact upon continental philosophy and literary theory.

Jean-François Lyotard (1924–1998) was a philosopher and literary theorist. He is well known for his articulation of Postmodernism after the late 1970s.

Other authors include Jean Baudrillard, who started with a situationist criticism of Consumption Society in the 1970s to evolve towards a reflection on simulation and virtual reality, Paul Virilio, both a philosopher and an urbanist, Cornelius Castoriadis, who was, along with Claude Lefort, co-founder of Socialisme ou Barbarie and criticized orthodox Marxism, Alain Badiou, François Laruelle, who developed "Non-philosophy" starting in the 1980s, Philippe Lacoue-Labarthe, Paul Ricoeur (administrator of the University of Nanterre during May '68), Emmanuel Levinas, Vincent Descombes, etc.

== 20th-century French feminism ==
The Feminist movement in contemporary France (or at least that which can be placed in the 'Philosophy' genre) is characterised more by deconstructionism and Marxism than much Anglo-American Feminism. Key thinkers include psychoanalytic and cultural theorist Luce Irigaray (born 1930), psychoanalyst and writer Julia Kristeva (born 1941), writer and philosopher Simone de Beauvoir, writer and cultural theorist Hélène Cixous and artist and psychoanalyst Bracha Ettinger.

== Important influences ==
One way of understanding French philosophy of this period is to locate the major influential figures in their current. The primary influences were the following 6 Germans from preceding eras: Hegel, Marx, Freud, Nietzsche, Husserl, Heidegger. For example, Alexander Kojeve's Lectures on the Phenomenology of Spirit were quite a sensation in Paris in the 1930s. It was attended by George Batailles and a young Jacques Lacan among others. Jean Wahl and Jean Hippolyte were also responsible for spreading Hegel's lectures into Parisian circles.

Marx was introduced to philosophers both inside and outside the university. Many, like Sartre and Merleau-Ponty, grew up during the Resistance against Nazi occupation, during which time they were introduced to Marxist-Leninists.

Nietzsche's influence went through George Batailles and the Acéphale group, down to Foucault and Deleuze. The Acéphale group is partly responsible for reclaiming Nietzsche for Western Philosophy, after decades of Nazi appropriation.

Heidegger and Husserl's influence was felt, firstly, in the existential-phenomenology of Sartre and Merleau-Ponty. Even Simon de Beauvoir's feminism borrowed extensively from this current. She used phenomenological conceptualizations of consciousness, time and memory to conceptualize Woman.

== The role of politics ==
20th century French philosophers lived through several very important political upheavals during their time. On the one hand, there was the Resistance against the Nazi forces. For Sartre and Merleau-Ponty, this was the first introduction to communism. Later, they would both become members of the PCF. The other important political event of that era was the Algerian War of Independence, to which the young Foucault, Derrida and Frantz Fanon went. While the PCF had a problematic role to play, dissident Marxist-Leninists of that era went there to help rebelling Algerians. Undoubtedly, for the next generation, the great political upheaval was the student-worker protests of May 1968. Young radicals, from the Sorbonne and Ecole Normale Supérieure organized, went to the factories and encouraged the worker's to go on strike. Many young radicals broke away from Marxism–Leninism towards Maoism at this point, while there were several Anarchists, Trotskyites, Situationists etc. at the protests as well.

Each of these events have shaped the content as well as the form of the writing of these French philosophers. Time and again, the movements have questioned the French state, the university, imperialism and capitalism as well. This has provided impetus, material and structural change to the current of French philosophy consistently.

== See also ==
- Collège de France
- Hermeneutics
- List of philosophers born in the nineteenth century
- List of philosophers born in the twentieth century
- French feminism
- Roland Barthes
