= Structural Marxism =

School of Marxist thought

Structural Marxism (or structuralist Marxism) is an approach to Marxism based on structuralism, primarily associated with the work of the French philosopher Louis Althusser and his students. It was influential in France during the late 1960s and 1970s, and also came to influence philosophers, political theorists and sociologists outside France during the 1970s. Structural Marxism arose in opposition to the humanist Marxism that dominated many universities in the West during the 1950s and 60s. In contrast to the humanist focus on the early works of Karl Marx, structural Marxism emphasizes the later, more structural works, such as Das Kapital, which Althusser argued represented a scientific break from Marx's earlier Hegelian humanism.

Because Althusser's thought was deeply rooted in the history of the French Communist Party (PCF), structural Marxism is often considered a politically-motivated theoretical intervention. Althusser's aim was to reconcile Marxism with the structuralist sciences of his day (such as the linguistics of Ferdinand de Saussure, the anthropology of Claude Lévi-Strauss, and the psychoanalysis of Jacques Lacan), creating a "third way" between the dogmatic dialectical materialism of the Stalinist era and the various humanist and existentialist Marxisms. His project was to re-establish Marxism as a science—"historical materialism"—by purging it of what he saw as its ideological, humanist and historicist elements.

Key concepts of structural Marxism include the idea of an "epistemological break" in Marx's thought, an anti-humanist view of history as a "process without a subject", and the concepts of overdetermination and relative autonomy of the superstructures from the economic base. In his later work, Althusser developed his theory of ideology and the process of "interpellation" to explain how subjects are constituted within social structures. The school of thought had a significant influence on figures such as Nicos Poulantzas, Étienne Balibar, and Pierre Macherey. However, it faced sustained criticism from other Marxist traditions, notably from historians like E. P. Thompson who accused it of being a form of idealism and Stalinism. By the late 1970s, the movement declined due to both internal theoretical problems and the rise of post-structuralism, with many of Althusser's own students becoming prominent critics.

== Intellectual and political context ==
Louis Althusser's project emerged from a specific intellectual and political conjuncture in post-war France, defined by the political crises of the Communist movement and major shifts in French philosophy.

=== Post-war French Marxism ===
After World War II, Marxist philosophy in France was largely divided between two trends. The first was the "orthodox" Marxism of the French Communist Party (PCF), which was codified into a dogmatic system known as dialectical materialism or "diamat". After being ejected from government in 1947 and with the onset of the Cold War, the PCF retreated into a "Stalinist fortress", loyally executing the demands of the Cominform and promoting a quasi-"third-period" rhetoric. This system treated Marxism as a universal "world-view" with laws applicable to both nature and history, often serving to legitimize the political line of the Soviet Union. The official philosophy of the PCF left little room for serious philosophical work, instead subordinating theoretical inquiry to the legitimation of party policy.

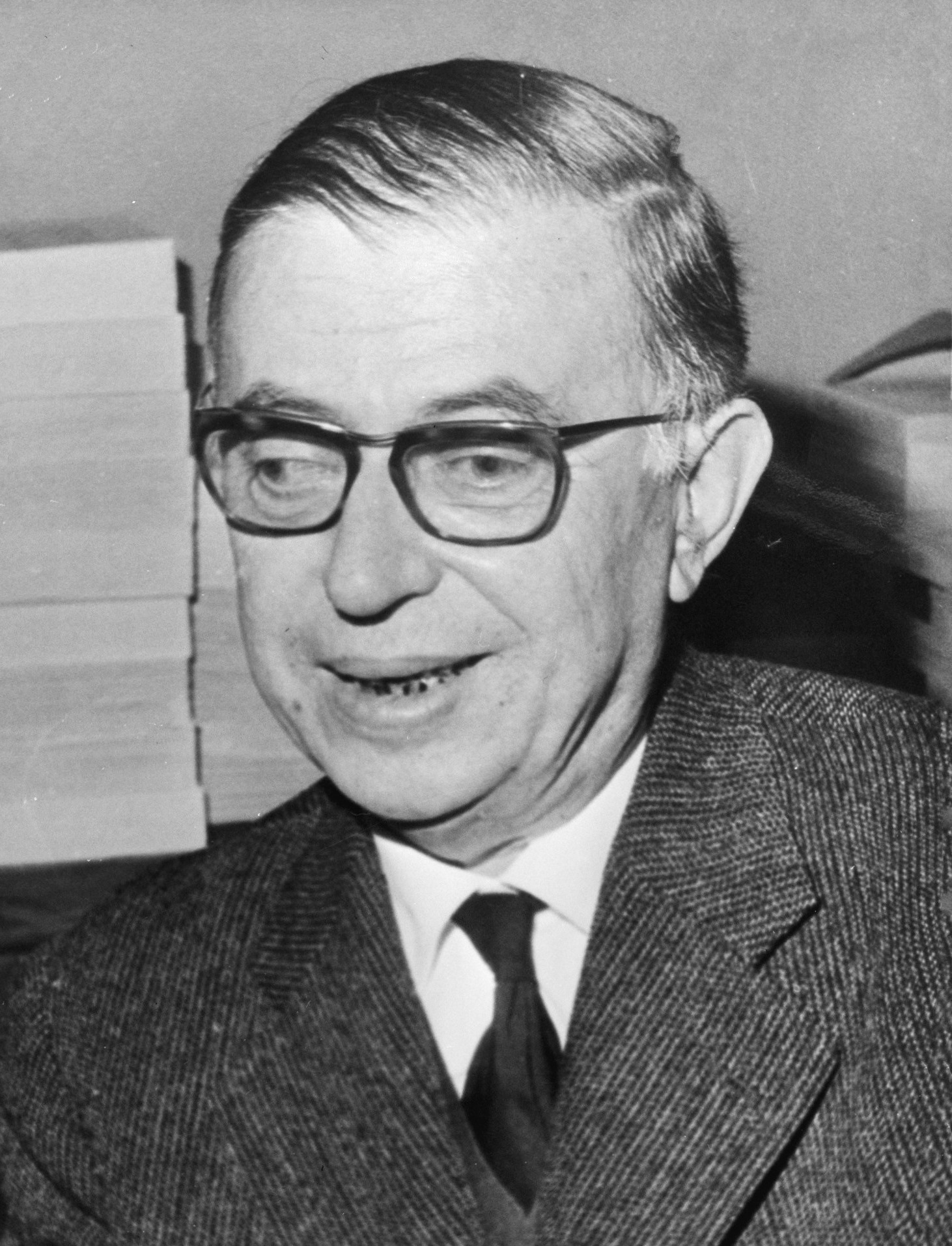
Jean-Paul Sartre, whose blend of existentialism and Marxist humanism was a primary target of Althusser's critique and the structural Marxist school

The second trend was a reaction against this orthodoxy, taking the form of Marxist humanism and often blending Marxism with existentialism and phenomenology. Thinkers like Jean-Paul Sartre and Maurice Merleau-Ponty, particularly after their experiences in the French Resistance, sought to develop a Marxism that emphasized human subjectivity, lived experience, and creative practice (praxis). This approach was part of a broader "Hegelian Marxist" current that emerged after World War I with the work of Georg Lukács and Karl Korsch, who reacted against the mechanistic and deterministic Marxism of the Second International by returning to Hegel and emphasizing class consciousness. This trend was given a new impetus by the discovery and publication in the post-war years of Karl Marx's early works, particularly the Economic and Philosophic Manuscripts of 1844 and the Grundrisse, which were saturated with Hegelian and humanist themes. Another important influence on post-war French Marxism was Alexandre Kojève's lectures on Hegel, which interpreted Hegel through a Marxist lens and emphasized themes such as the end of history and the master–slave dialectic. The humanist Marxists rejected the scientific and determinist "iron laws" of dialectical materialism, arguing that Stalinism's theoretical naturalism denied the specificity of human history as the product of creative human agency. Their philosophy was "subject-centered", rooted in the lived experience of the historical actor as the source of both history and knowledge.

This intellectual environment was transformed by two major political events. First, Nikita Khrushchev's "Secret Speech" at the Twentieth Congress of the CPSU in 1956, which denounced the crimes of the Stalin era, created a crisis within Western Communist Parties that Althusser later described as an "earthquake". This "de-Stalinization" opened up a new space for criticism and intellectual freedom, allowing for critical encounters with both Marxist orthodoxy and non-Marxist traditions. Second, the Sino-Soviet split provided an alternative model of socialist construction in China and introduced the theoretical work of Mao Zedong into European debates. For many commentators, the Sino-Soviet dispute was the "real political background" to Althusser's work.

=== The rise of structuralism ===
By the late 1950s and early 1960s, the intellectual tide in France turned away from the subject-centered philosophies of existentialism and phenomenology toward structuralism. This shift was characterized as a move from the legacy of the "three H's" (Hegel, Edmund Husserl, and Martin Heidegger) to that of the three "masters of suspicion" (Marx, Friedrich Nietzsche, and Sigmund Freud). The principal source of this movement was the structural linguistics of Ferdinand de Saussure, which emphasized that language is a system of signs whose meaning is determined not by reference to an external reality or the intention of a speaker, but by the internal relations of difference within the linguistic system.

This approach was extended to other fields, radically challenging the idea of the autonomous, meaning-creating human subject:

- In anthropology, Claude Lévi-Strauss analyzed myths, kinship, and other social practices as "codes" governed by underlying structural rules, analogous to language. History was not the product of conscious human projects but was determined by the totality of these rule systems.
- In psychoanalysis, Jacques Lacan reinterpreted Freud through structural linguistics, arguing that "the unconscious is structured like a language". The sovereign, conscious self of Cartesian philosophy was displaced by a subject constituted through its entry into a pre-existing "symbolic order".

The common theme of structuralism was the "decentering of the subject": the human subject was no longer seen as the source of meaning, but as an effect, a "prisoner of meaning" constituted by external structures (linguistic, cultural, or unconscious). This provided Althusser with powerful tools to criticize the humanist Marxisms of Sartre and others.

=== Althusser's intervention ===
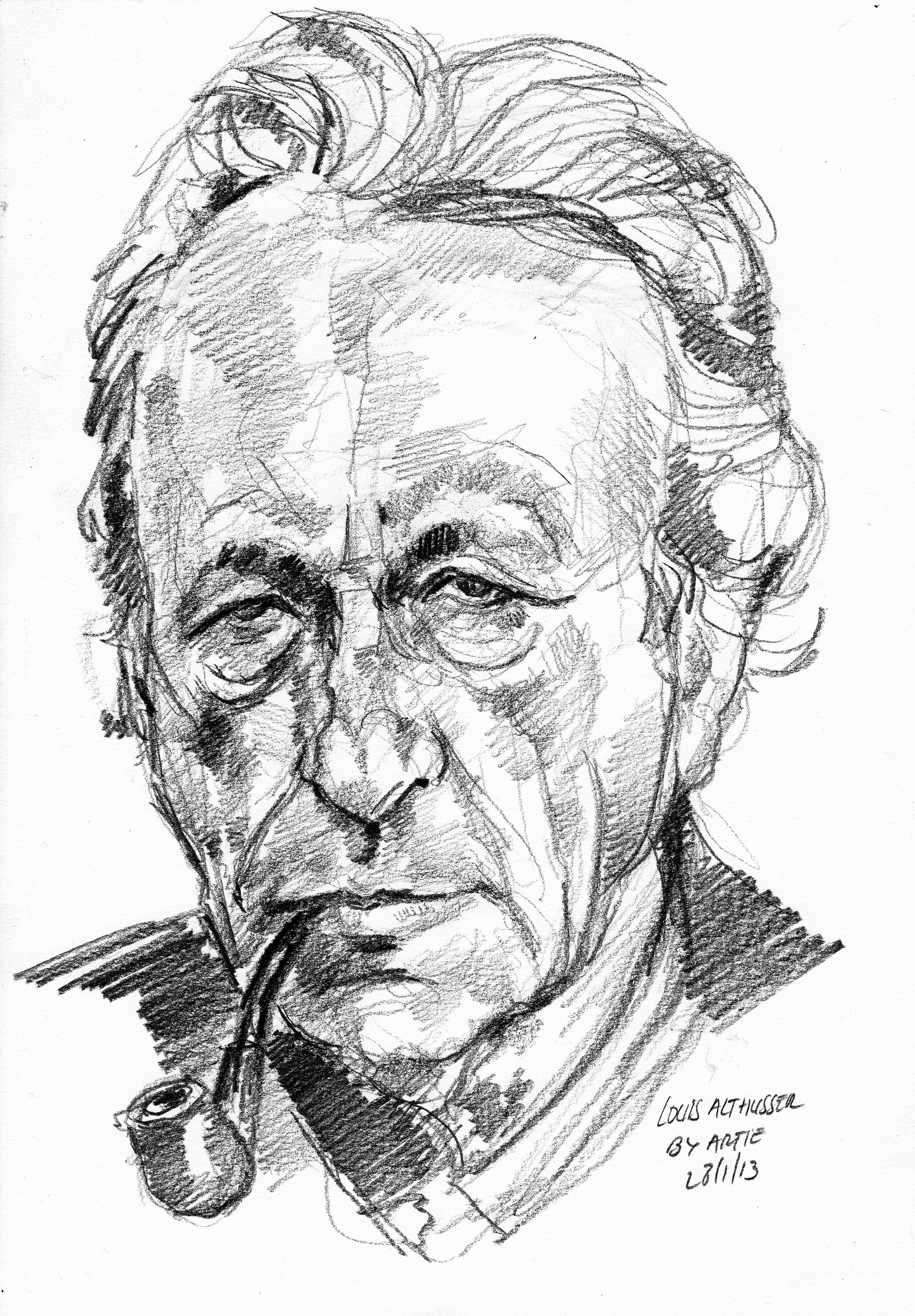
Sketch of Louis Althusser

Althusser's work in the early 1960s, collected in For Marx and Reading Capital (both 1965), constituted a decisive intervention into this context. As a philosopher and member of the PCF, he sought to chart a "third way" that was neither the dogmatic scientism of Stalinism nor the philosophical humanism of its critics. He did this by denying that humanist Marxism was authentically Marxist at all. Instead, he argued that Marxism was a science—historical materialism—and that its scientificity had been established by Marx himself in a radical break from his early humanist and Hegelian writings.

To make this case, Althusser allied with structuralism and another French intellectual tradition, the "historical epistemology" of philosophers of science like Gaston Bachelard. From Bachelard, he borrowed the concept of the "epistemological break" (coupure épistémologique), a discontinuous rupture that separates a new science from its ideological prehistory. Althusser's project was to use these tools to purify Marxism of its ideological elements and re-establish it on a scientific footing. This intervention was simultaneously political: it was conceived as a left-wing critique of Stalinism that, unlike humanism, did not abandon the theoretical tools needed to analyze Stalinism as a historical reality, and as a theoretical opposition to the "rightist" tendencies of reformism and opportunism which he saw growing within the PCF.

== Key concepts ==
Althusser's project involved a fundamental re-reading of Marx and a re-conceptualization of historical materialism as a science. This produced a distinct set of theoretical concepts that defined the structural Marxist school.

=== Science versus ideology ===
The central theoretical move in Althusser's work is a rigid distinction between science and ideology. Drawing on the historical epistemology of Gaston Bachelard, Althusser argued that science is not the opposite of ignorance, but of a "tenacious web of error" embodied in ideology. This distinction is elaborated through two key concepts:

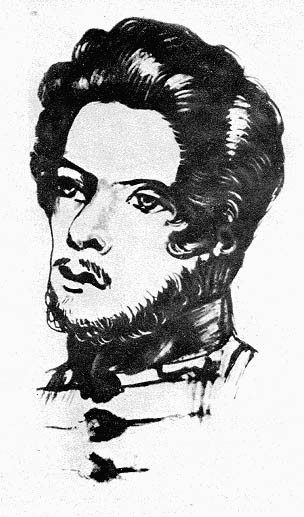
Depiction of the young Marx (left), and Marx in 1875. A central tenet of structural Marxism is an "epistemological break" that separates his early, "ideological" humanist works from the scientific project of his later writings.
- Epistemological break (coupure épistémologique): Althusser argued that the history of a science is marked by a radical, discontinuous "break" that separates the new scientific field from its "pre-scientific" ideological past. He located such a break in Marx's own intellectual development around 1845, with works like The German Ideology and the Theses on Feuerbach. According to Althusser, these texts mark Marx's definitive rupture with his early, "ideological" works, which were dominated by Hegelian and Feuerbachian humanism, and the founding of a new science: historical materialism. Consequently, the early writings of Marx (such as the Economic and Philosophic Manuscripts of 1844) were not to be considered part of scientific Marxism, but belonged to its prehistory. One political interpretation of this theoretical move is that it allowed Althusser to "neatly eliminate" questions concerning alienation and the nature of work which were "embarrassing to the Soviet state".
- Problematic: The epistemological break is understood as a change in the fundamental "problematic" of a discourse. A problematic is not simply a set of ideas, but the underlying theoretical framework—the "objective internal reference system...the system of questions commanding the answers given"—that determines what can be thought and said within a particular discourse. A scientific problematic is "open," capable of development, whereas an ideological problematic is "closed," dominated by its service to extra-theoretical, "practico-social" functions. The break in Marx's work was therefore a shift from the humanist problematic of alienation and human essence to the scientific problematic of concepts like mode of production, social formation, and class struggle. To identify a text's problematic, Althusser proposed a method of "symptomatic reading", borrowed from Freud, which seeks to uncover the text's unspoken assumptions, "silences", and the "undivulged event" that structures its content.

=== Anti-humanism and anti-historicism ===
Based on this epistemological break, Althusser mounted a critique of two tendencies he saw as ideological deviations within Marxism: theoretical humanism and historicism.

- Theoretical anti-humanism: Althusser famously declared that Marxism is a "theoretical anti-humanism". He rejected the idea, central to both Feuerbach and the early Marx, that history is the story of the alienation and eventual self-realization of a universal "human essence". For scientific Marxism, concepts like "Man" and human nature are ideological, not scientific. Instead, history must be understood as a "process without a subject". Individuals are not the autonomous creators of history; they are the "bearers" (Träger) or supports of objective social relations and structures. Subjectivity itself is an effect of ideology.
- Anti-historicism: Closely related is Althusser's critique of historicism, which he defined as any teleological conception of history as a linear, continuous process moving toward a pre-determined goal. He argued that the Hegelian dialectic, even when "inverted" by Marxists, retained this structure, viewing history as the self-development of a simple, inner principle (whether the Idea, "Man", or the productive forces). Althusser argued that this "expressive totality", where each part of society is seen as an expression of a single essence, was incompatible with the scientific Marxist concept of a complex, decentred social formation.

=== Theory of the social formation ===
Diagram illustrating Althusser's theory of the social formation, depicting relations between economic, political, and ideological instances and the human agent

Althusser proposed a new conceptualization of the social whole (or "social formation") based on his reading of Capital.

- Levels and practices: The social formation is a complex, structured whole consisting of distinct levels or "instances": the economic, the political, and the ideological. This totality is not unified by a central essence but is a "de-centred structure in dominance".
- Relative autonomy and determination in the last instance: Against economic determinism (or "economism"), Althusser argued that the political and ideological levels have a "relative autonomy". They are not mere passive reflections of the economic base but are themselves effective structures that are conditions of existence for the economy. The primacy of the economy is maintained through the concept of "determination in the last instance", which means the economy determines which level will be dominant in a given mode of production (e.g., politics in feudalism, ideology in some pre-capitalist societies, and the economy in capitalism). The dominance of the economy is therefore never direct or simple; as Althusser puts it, "the lonely hour of the 'last instance' never comes".
- Overdetermination: Borrowing from psychoanalysis, Althusser used the concept of overdetermination to describe the complex causality at work in a social formation. Each level has its own "peculiar time" and rhythm of development. A contradiction (such as the one between capital and labor) is never simple but is always "overdetermined"—shaped, displaced, and specified by the other contradictions and effectivities of the different levels of the social formation. A revolutionary "rupture" occurs not from the simple maturation of the economic contradiction, but from a "condensation" or fusion of a multiplicity of contradictions into a "ruptural unity".
- Structural causality: To conceptualize the determination of the elements of a structure by the structure itself, Althusser proposed a new concept of "structural causality". Drawing on Baruch Spinoza's idea of an "immanent cause", he argued that the structure is not an external cause (like in mechanics) or an inner essence expressing itself (like in Hegel), but is a cause that is immanent in its effects. The structure is nothing other than the totality of its effects, "present only in and as its effects", and its existence is secured by the mechanism that produces those effects. It is an "absent cause" that is not directly visible but can be inferred from its effects, analogous to the Freudian unconscious.

== Later developments and self-criticism ==
In the late 1960s, influenced by the political events of May 68 and the Cultural Revolution in China, as well as by criticisms from his own students, Althusser undertook a significant self-criticism and revision of his earlier positions.

=== New conception of philosophy ===
Althusser abandoned his earlier definition of philosophy as a "theory of theoretical practice". This earlier formulation, he argued, was "theoreticist" and "positivist," as it wrongly treated philosophy as a science above other sciences, capable of guaranteeing their truth. He proposed a new definition: philosophy is, in the last resort, "class struggle in the domain of theory".

According to this new view, philosophy has no object of its own and produces no knowledge. Instead, it is a political intervention. It represents the political line of the class struggle within the field of theory (for example, defending scientific materialism against idealist ideologies), and it represents scientificity in the field of politics (defending "correct" political positions against "deviations"). The entire history of philosophy is seen as a struggle between two tendencies, materialism and idealism, which ultimately represent the class outlooks of the proletariat and the bourgeoisie, respectively. From this new perspective, Althusser admitted his earlier work had largely ignored class struggle, though Harry Cleaver argued this revision still limited the concept to the "ideological battles of leftist intellectuals".

=== Ideology and Ideological State Apparatuses ===
In his influential 1970 essay "Ideology and Ideological State Apparatuses", Althusser offered a new theory of ideology that moved away from the earlier science/ideology pairing. This essay was drawn from a larger, unpublished manuscript written in 1969, On the Superstructure. Althusser argued that the reproduction of the relations of production is the primary function of the state. The state achieves this not only through overt coercion via the "Repressive State Apparatus" (RSA)—the government, police, army, courts, prisons—but also, and primarily, through ideology via "Ideological State Apparatuses" (ISAs).

The ISAs are a plurality of seemingly private institutions—such as the church, the family, the educational system, the media, trade unions, and political parties—that function to secure the reproduction of the relations of production by inculcating the dominant ideology. Whereas the RSA functions primarily by violence, the ISAs function primarily by ideology. Althusser argued that in pre-capitalist formations the dominant ISA was the Church, but that under capitalism, this role was taken over by the educational system. He contended that ideology is an "organic part of every social totality", a permanent and necessary feature of all societies, including communist ones, because it serves the indispensable function of social cohesion.

=== Interpellation ===
Within this framework, Althusser proposed a new theory of how ideology functions to constitute individuals as subjects. He argued that "ideology has a material existence" in the practices and rituals of the ISAs. Individuals are integrated into ideology through a process he called "interpellation" or "hailing".

Ideology functions by "hailing" concrete individuals as concrete subjects. In recognizing themselves as the one who is hailed (for example, by a policeman shouting "Hey, you there!"), the individual becomes a subject who freely accepts their subjection to a higher Subject (God, the State, Capital). Drawing on Lacanian psychoanalysis, especially the concept of the mirror stage, Althusser argued that this constitution of the subject in ideology is a process of (mis)recognition, where the subject perceives their ideological subjection as a form of free will and self-transparency. This mechanism ensures that individuals willingly fulfill their roles within the relations of production, giving them the illusion that history was made for them, while in fact they are merely agents in a "process without a subject".

== Influence and legacy ==
Structural Marxism proved to be an enormously influential, though controversial, theoretical current in the 1970s. Its concepts were applied and developed in a wide range of fields, including political theory, anthropology, class analysis, and feminist theory.

=== Class analysis and state theory ===
The most prominent theorist to develop Althusserian ideas in political science was Nicos Poulantzas. In works like Political Power and Social Classes (1968), Poulantzas applied the concepts of relative autonomy and structural determination to the analysis of the capitalist state and class structure.

Poulantzas argued that the state in capitalist societies is not a simple instrument of the ruling class. Because the capitalist class is itself divided into competing "fractions" (e.g., industrial capital, finance capital), the state must have relative autonomy from any particular fraction in order to organize the long-term political interests of the capitalist class as a whole (the "power bloc"). The function of the state is to maintain the cohesion of the social formation, and it does so through organizing the "hegemonic" leadership of the power bloc and disorganizing the dominated classes. Poulantzas also developed a complex theory of class determination, arguing that classes are defined not just by their economic position, but by their position in political and ideological structures as well. This led to his controversial analysis of the "new petty bourgeoisie". The Althusserian tradition also influenced the state theory of Göran Therborn and the work on ideology and populism by Ernesto Laclau.

=== Anthropology and analysis of modes of production ===
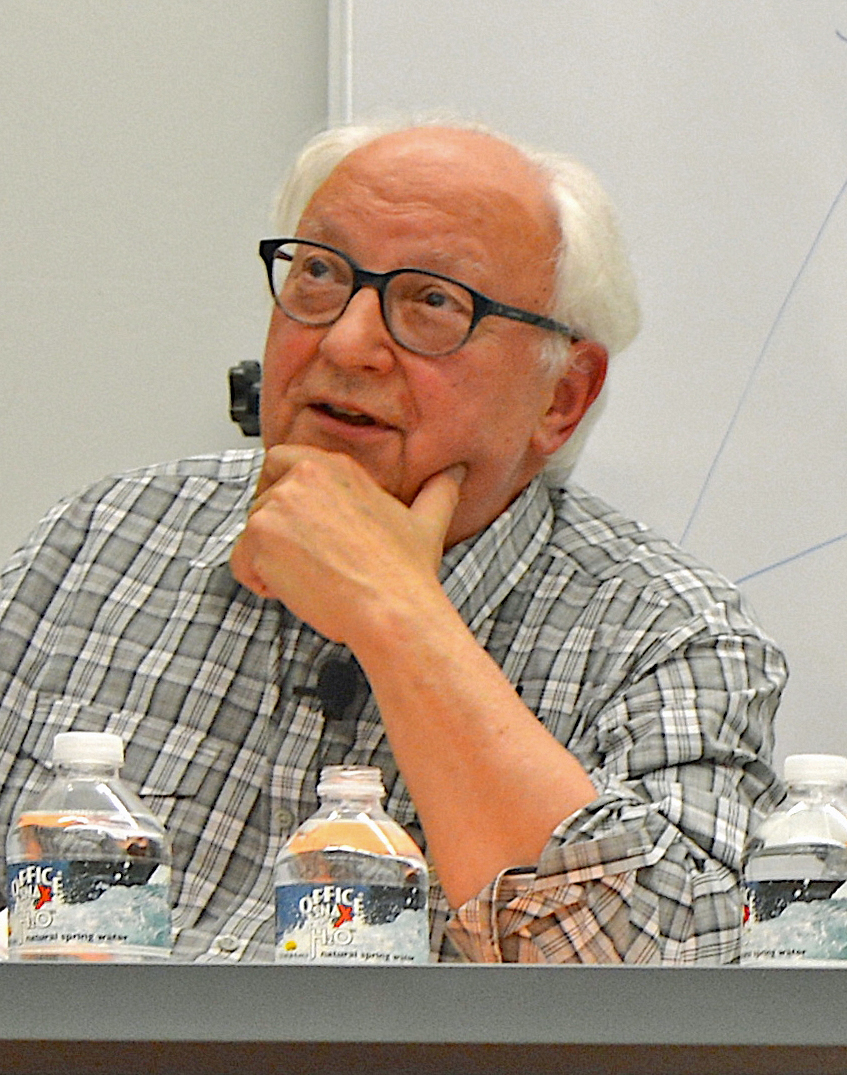
Étienne Balibar

Althusser and Étienne Balibar's reconceptualization of the mode of production had a major impact on Marxist anthropology. Their abstract, trans-historical concepts were seen as a tool for analyzing pre-capitalist societies without imposing a Eurocentric or evolutionary schema. French anthropologists like Emmanuel Terray and Claude Meillassoux used this framework to analyze lineage-based societies in Africa. Terray, for instance, re-analyzed Meillassoux's work on the Gouro people to argue that kinship relations were the "realisation" of the economic, political, and ideological determinations of a specific "lineage mode of production".

This work gave rise to the influential concept of the "articulation of modes of production," which theorized how a single social formation could be composed of a complex combination of several modes of production (e.g., a capitalist mode articulated with a pre-capitalist or "domestic" mode). This concept was widely used to analyze colonial and post-colonial societies, imperialism, and historical transitions, such as the transition from feudalism to capitalism. The Althusserian use of this concept was deployed by Communist Party theoreticians as a "counterattack" against New Left dependency theorists such as Andre Gunder Frank, who, according to the Althusserians, had failed to adequately theorize the specificity of production relationships in the Third World. The Althusserian school has also influenced concrete historical analyses by figures such as Guy Bois, Robert Linhart, Perry Anderson, and Gareth Stedman Jones.

=== Feminist theory ===
Several concepts from structural Marxism were taken up by feminist theorists in the 1970s as a way to theorize patriarchy and the oppression of women within a materialist framework.

- The "domestic labor debate" drew on the Althusserian focus on reproduction. Theorists analyzed the family and domestic labor as a distinct mode of production (the "domestic mode") responsible for the production and reproduction of labor power, a function essential for the capitalist mode of production with which it was articulated.
- The theory of Ideological State Apparatuses was used to analyze the family and schools as key sites for the reproduction of gender ideology and the constitution of gendered subjects.
- The theory of interpellation was linked with Lacanian psychoanalysis to provide a theory of the constitution of gendered subjectivity. Juliet Mitchell's Psychoanalysis and Feminism (1974) famously used this framework to argue that patriarchy, as a universal ideological structure, is established through the entry of individuals into the symbolic order via the Oedipus complex.

== Criticism and decline ==
Structural Marxism came under sustained attack from multiple directions, and its influence waned significantly by the early 1980s. The critiques focused on its theoretical inconsistencies, its political implications, and its alleged philosophical flaws.

=== Functionalism and the problem of change ===
A widespread criticism was that Althusser's framework, particularly his theory of reproduction, was a form of structural functionalism. Critics argued that Althusser explained social institutions (like the ISAs) in terms of their "function" in satisfying the needs of the system (the reproduction of the relations of production). This was seen as a "systems teleology", where the needs of the system magically call forth the institutions that fulfill them. This functionalist logic, combined with the concept of structural causality, was said to produce a static model of society as a self-perpetuating system in which historical change, particularly revolutionary change initiated by class struggle, became theoretically inconceivable. While Althusser later introduced "class struggle" as the "motor of history," critics argued that this was an ad hoc addition that was not integrated into the rest of his theoretical framework. A related critique, leveled by Alex Callinicos, is that Althusser's insistence on the necessity of ideology for all societies, including post-revolutionary ones, transforms Marxism from a theory of class struggle into a general theory of "social cohesion", more akin to the sociology of Émile Durkheim than to Marx.

=== The critique from historians ===
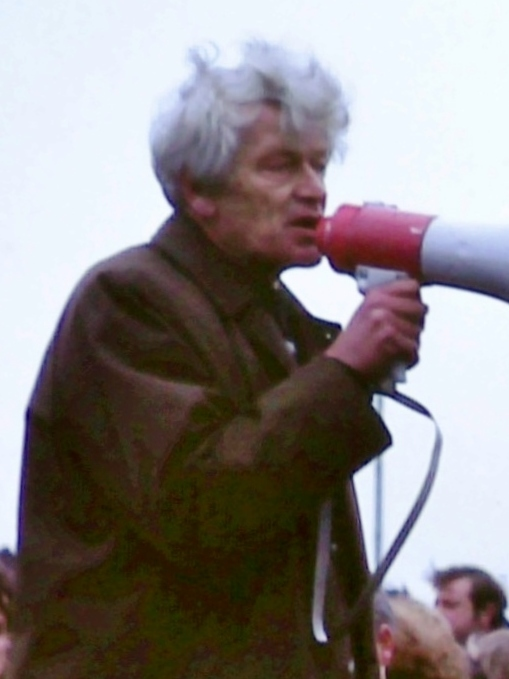
E. P. Thompson, a major critic of structural Marxism

One of the most powerful critiques came from Marxist historians, most notably E. P. Thompson in his polemical essay The Poverty of Theory (1978). Thompson accused Althusserianism of being a new form of idealism, a "theology" that imposed a pre-conceived theoretical schema (the "orrery") onto the real flow of history. He argued that Althusser's anti-empiricism and his dismissal of "experience" were a rejection of the historian's craft and an assertion of intellectual elitism. Thompson defended a conception of history as an open-ended "process" shaped by the conscious agency of human beings. He charged that Althusser's structural determinism, by reducing humans to mere "bearers" of structures, eliminated human agency from history and led to a theoretical justification for Stalinism, famously calling it "Stalinism reduced to the paradigm of Theory". Another line of critique came from autonomist Marxists such as Harry Cleaver, who characterized Althusser's work as a "born-again orthodoxy" and a "sterile and dogmatic ideology of domination" which presented a "lifeless sociological taxonomy of modes of production" notable for the "absence of class struggle".

Other critics, while accepting the force of Thompson's argument against Althusser's determinism, considered the charge of Stalinism to be unsubstantiated and "remarkably flimsy". They noted that Althusser himself wrote against "the massive edifice of Stalinism" and that his works were received with "extreme skepticism, if not hostility" by the leadership of the PCF. From this perspective, while Althusser's philosophical denial of human agency was a serious theoretical problem, to see in it a rationale for mass liquidation was an "unwarranted" leap.

=== Epistemological problems and post-structuralism ===
The theoretical foundations of Althusserianism also came under attack, often from his former students who went on to form the core of the post-structuralist movement. Critics argued that the very attempt to establish a definitive epistemological criterion to distinguish science from ideology was untenable. The reliance on structuralism and conventionalist philosophy of science, they claimed, led to a form of relativism that was incompatible with Althusser's claim that Marxism was an objective science. The rigid distinction between the "real object" and the "object of knowledge" created an unbridgeable gap, making it impossible to validate knowledge claims about reality. Althusser's coherence theory of truth was accused of being a form of idealism, unable to distinguish between internally consistent theories and thus risking "epistemological agnosticism".

Thinkers like Michel Foucault rejected the science/ideology distinction altogether, instead analyzing all discourses, including scientific ones, as "regimes of truth" inseparable from institutional power. The Nouveaux Philosophes, many of them former Maoist-Althusserians like André Glucksmann and Bernard-Henri Lévy, went further. Emerging from the disillusionment with Maoism following the exposure of the Gulag by Aleksandr Solzhenitsyn, they denounced structural Marxism as a totalitarian "master discourse" that completed the oppressive trajectory of Western rationality, leading logically to the Gulag. This "rebellion of subjectivity" marked the definitive end of structural Marxism's intellectual hegemony in Paris and contributed to its broader decline.
