= Apartheid (disambiguation) =

Apartheid was a system of institutionalised racial segregation enforced by the South African Government between 1948 to 1994.

Apartheid may also refer to:

- Crime of apartheid, defined in international law
- Allegations of apartheid by country
- Apartheid Convention, international treaty to prevent apartheid
- European apartheid

== Uses in non-racial contexts ==
- Caste apartheid, segregation on the basis of the Indian caste system
- Gender apartheid, economic and social discrimination because of gender
- Global apartheid, argument that the global order imposes a kind of apartheid on people from the Global South
- Occupational apartheid, the concept that people can be deprived of meaningful work through segregation
- Religious apartheid, separation of people according to their religion
- Social apartheid, segregation on the basis of class or economic status
- Technological apartheid, the denial of modern technologies to Third World or developing nations
