= Reading Capital =

1965 book by Louis Althusser

- Cover of the 1966 edition
- Authors: Louis Althusser, Étienne Balibar, Jacques Rancière, Pierre Macherey, Roger Establet
- Original title: Lire le Capital
- Translators: Ben Brewster; David Fernbach
- Language: French
- Subject: Das Kapital
- Publisher: François Maspero, New Left Books
- Publication date: 1965
- Publication place: France
- English publication date: 1970
- Media type: Print (Hardcover and Paperback)
- Pages: 340 (abridged English translation); 565 (complete English translation)
- ISBN: 978-1-78478-141-5

Reading Capital (French: Lire le Capital) is a 1965 book about Karl Marx's Capital, written by the French philosopher Louis Althusser and his students Étienne Balibar, Jacques Rancière, Pierre Macherey, and Roger Establet. The book was first published in France by François Maspero. An abridged edition was published in 1968, and a complete English translation in 2016.

Reading Capital is a key text of structural Marxism. It offers a philosophical re-reading of Capital as a scientific and theoretical work, rather than a text of humanist economics or historicist prophecy. The book introduced the influential concept of "symptomatic reading", a method of textual analysis that seeks to identify the unconscious, unposed theoretical problems within a text by examining its omissions and structural tensions. The authors critique empiricist, humanist, and Hegelian interpretations of Marx, arguing for an "epistemological break" in his thought around 1845, which separated his early, more ideological work from the scientific framework of his later writings. The book's publication history is complex; a heavily abridged French edition published in 1968 served as the basis for most international translations for decades, which significantly shaped its global reception by omitting several key essays.

== Background and publication ==
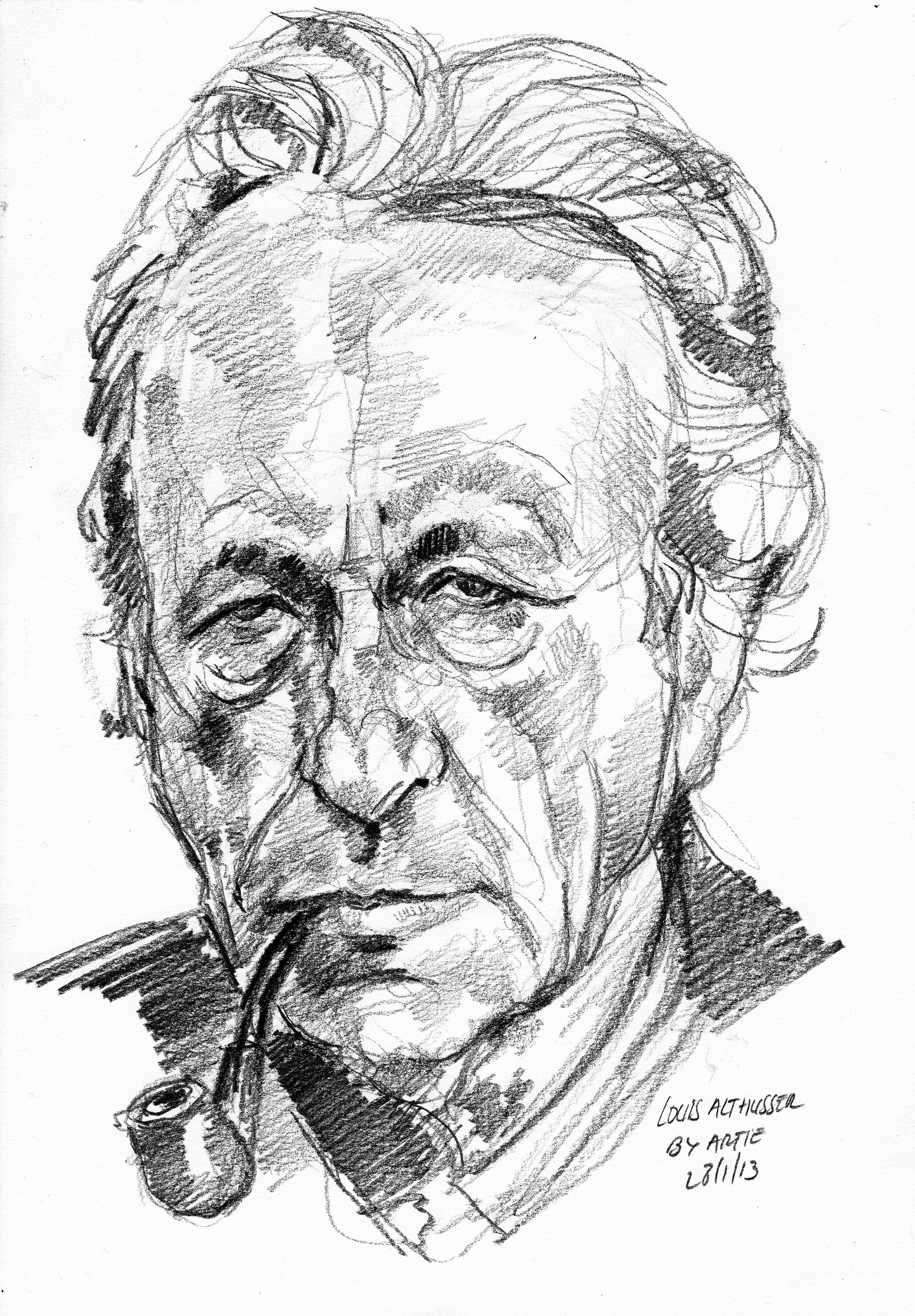
Sketch depicting Louis Althusser

Reading Capital originated in a seminar on Karl Marx's Capital held at the École normale supérieure in Paris during the 1964–65 academic year. The seminar was led by Louis Althusser, then a professor of philosophy at the school, and was collectively organized with his students Étienne Balibar, Yves Duroux, Jacques Rancière, and Jean-Claude Milner. The project was intended as a philosophical reading of Capital, an approach Althusser had called for in his earlier work, published in the collection For Marx. The result was a "collective work" in which each contributor, working independently, reached similar conclusions through different paths.

The project emerged in a specific political and intellectual context. The de-Stalinization that followed the 20th Congress of the Soviet Communist Party in 1956 had created an opening for new interpretations of Marxism that could challenge both Stalinist orthodoxy and the resurgent humanist readings of Marx that were gaining traction within the French Communist Party (PCF). Althusser's intervention was a "two-front war", opposing both the dogmatic scientism of dialectical materialism and the historicism and humanism of Marxists influenced by Jean-Paul Sartre and Georg Wilhelm Friedrich Hegel.

The papers from the seminar were collected and published in two volumes in November 1965 by publisher François Maspero, under the title Lire le Capital. The collection included contributions from Althusser, Balibar, Rancière, Pierre Macherey, and Roger Establet. Published as part of the 'Théorie' series edited by Althusser, the book was designed to oppose what Althusser saw as theoretical and political "opportunism" within the PCF. The publication was an immediate success in French academic and communist circles, establishing Althusser and his collaborators as prominent figures in Marxist philosophy.

In early 1968, Maspero approached Althusser about releasing a more accessible single-volume paperback edition. For this second edition, the contributions by Establet, Macherey, and Rancière's chapter "The Concept of Critique and the Critique of Political Economy from 'The 1844 Manuscripts' to Capital" were removed. This abridged version, containing only the revised essays by Althusser and Balibar, became the basis for most foreign translations, including the first English translation by Ben Brewster in 1970. This decision fundamentally shaped the international reception of the book. According to Nick Nesbitt, this abridged version led to a reception focused on Althusser's theory of ideology, while the "theoreticist, epistemological focus" of the original edition was largely dismissed or ignored. In France, a more complete four-volume paperback edition was published in 1973, which restored the previously excluded chapters. A complete English edition, translated by Ben Brewster and David Fernbach, was not published until 2016.

== Synopsis and key concepts ==
Reading Capital presents a philosophical interpretation of Capital, arguing that Marx's work constitutes a scientific revolution that breaks radically with all previous forms of political economy and philosophy. The book develops a series of concepts to articulate the specificity of Marx's scientific project, including critiques of empiricism, humanism, and historicism.

=== Symptomatic reading ===
The book's most famous conceptual innovation is the method of "symptomatic reading" (lecture symptomale). Althusser derived this method from Marx's own reading of classical political economists such as Adam Smith. A symptomatic reading treats a text not as a simple expression of an author's thought but as a complex structure marked by "lapses", silences, and absences. The goal is to identify the text's "unsaid", which is not a hidden meaning but an "unposed problem" that the text implicitly addresses without being able to formulate. This technique, which Althusser drew in part from the psychoanalysis of Jacques Lacan, seeks to reveal the underlying "problematic"—the theoretical framework of concepts and questions—that governs a text.

According to Robert J. C. Young, this method involves a "double reading". The first reading is a literal one, but the second reading seeks to identify the invisible gaps and internal contradictions within the text. Althusser argues that what a text does not see is a function of what it does see; its blindness is the condition of its insight. The symptomatic reading aims to produce the unstated question to which the text is an answer, thereby revealing the text's underlying conceptual framework. Althusser connects this method to the work of both Baruch Spinoza and Sigmund Freud, particularly Freud's analysis of the unconscious as it manifests in slips and omissions.

=== Critique of humanism and empiricism ===
Reading Capital is an anti-humanist work. It rejects the idea that history is made by a collective "Man" or that society can be understood as the expression of a human essence. Instead, it argues that Marx's scientific breakthrough in Capital was to analyze social structures and their objective relations, such as the forces and relations of production, without recourse to a pre-given concept of the human subject. Critics such as Harry Cleaver have argued that this anti-humanist stance, particularly the sidelining of concepts like alienation, served a political purpose by deflecting critiques of the Soviet Union that were often framed in humanist terms.

The book is also anti-empiricist. Althusser argues that knowledge is not derived from the immediate experience of a "real" object but is instead produced through a process internal to thought. He follows Spinoza in distinguishing between the "real object" (the external reality) and the "object of knowledge" (the conceptual object of a science). The process of knowledge production, or what Althusser calls "theoretical practice", takes place "entirely in thought". Science produces knowledge not by abstracting an essence from the real, but by transforming ideological "raw materials" (Généralités I) into scientific concepts (Généralités III) through a specific conceptual framework (Généralités II). This process is internal to theory and its validity is guaranteed by its own protocols, not by correspondence with an external reality.

=== Structure and causality ===
The book develops a specific theory of social structure based on a concept of "structural causality". Rejecting both mechanistic causality (where cause and effect are external to each other) and expressive causality (where a central essence, like the Hegelian Geist, is expressed in all parts of a whole), Althusser proposes a causality where the structure itself is immanent in its effects. The structure is not an external cause, but is present only through the totality of its effects, and is therefore an "absent cause". This means that the various levels of a social formation (economic, political, ideological) are not expressions of a single principle but are relatively autonomous and possess their own specific temporalities. The totality is thus "decentered" and complexly articulated, held together by a "structure in dominance". Drawing on Spinoza, Althusser argues that the mode of production is a "cause immanent in its effects", a formulation that some critics, such as Ted Benton, have argued leads to a static conception of social structures that cannot account for historical change.

== Themes and interpretation ==
=== Epistemological framework ===
In Reading Capital, the word "theory" is what Alain Badiou calls a "master-word". Badiou argues that Althusser's primary gesture is to dismantle the traditional dialectical opposition between theory and practice. Instead of a relationship of external verification, where the truth of theory lies in its practical application, Althusser defines theory itself as a specific kind of practice: "theoretical practice". This practice has its own material components (concepts) and produces a specific product: knowledge.

This framework is heavily influenced by the tradition of French epistemology known as "historical epistemology", particularly the work of Gaston Bachelard. From this tradition, Althusser borrows key concepts such as the "epistemological break" (a radical discontinuity that separates a science from its ideological pre-history) and the "problematic" (the underlying theoretical framework that defines the field of possible questions and answers for a science). Althusser's analysis of "knowledge as production" and the distinction between the "real object" and the "object of knowledge" created what Ted Benton described as an unresolved tension in his work, leaving him caught between a materialist commitment to objective reality and a conventionalist view where knowledge is a purely internal discursive process.

=== Balibar's contribution ===
Étienne Balibar's contribution, "The Basic Concepts of Historical Materialism", was the most systematic attempt within the original edition to elaborate the concepts of historical materialism in line with Althusserian principles, purged of all historicist and humanist assumptions. Balibar analyzes the Marxist concept of the mode of production as a combination of a "property connexion" (the social relations of production) and a "material-appropriation connexion" (the labour process). He argues that different modes of production (e.g., feudalism, capitalism) represent different combinations of these invariant elements. Balibar's essay also introduces a theory of historical transition that attempts to avoid teleology. Instead of seeing history as a linear succession of modes of production, he develops the idea of the "articulation" of multiple modes of production within a single social formation, with historical change occurring through shifts in the dominance of these articulated modes.

=== Textual complexity and translation ===
Robert J. C. Young analyzes Althusser's injunction to read Capital "to the letter" ("à la lettre"). Young points out the paradox that Althusser and his students were themselves reading Capital in a French translation by Joseph Roy, a version that Marx himself had not only supervised but extensively "revised, or rather, rewrote". Furthermore, the textual history of Capital is itself immensely complex, comprising multiple German editions, drafts, and manuscripts published over many decades, making the very idea of a single, definitive "original text" problematic.

For Young, this textual complexity is not an obstacle to be overcome but is rather the very basis for Althusser's method. The symptomatic reading becomes a way of engaging with this "almost undecipherable palimpsest". It is a reading that must account for the work's internal dislocations (décalage) and temporal lags, both within the text and between its various versions. The act of reading becomes a form of "double reading" that is akin to translation—not a simple transfer of meaning, but a transformation and production of new knowledge. In this light, Marx's own revision of the French translation becomes a model for the symptomatic reading: a rewriting that produces new concepts by transforming the original text. Ultimately, the reading Althusser proposes is a "form of stenographic dictatorship", where the reader writes "at his dictation", producing Marx's unwritten philosophy from within his scientific text.

== Legacy ==
Reading Capital was a watershed text in Marxist philosophy and critical theory. Its argument for a scientific, anti-humanist Marx was highly influential in the 1960s and 1970s, but it also drew harsh criticism for its "theoreticism"—its apparent separation of theoretical work from political practice. Some of Althusser's own collaborators, most notably Jacques Rancière, would later repudiate the project, with Rancière's Althusser's Lesson (1974) offering a powerful polemic against the intellectual elitism he saw in Althusser's distinction between science and ideology.

In his book Reading Capital Politically (1979), the autonomist Marxist theorist Harry Cleaver presented a sustained critique of Althusser's work as a prime example of a reading of Marx that severs his analysis from the practical realities of class struggle. Cleaver argues that Althusser's project was a "born-again orthodoxy"—an attempt to revitalize dialectical materialism as an ideology to serve the political needs of the French Communist Party. From this perspective, Althusser's "philosopher's reading" presents Capital as an abstract, theoretical science, divorcing it from concrete history and the revolutionary self-activity of the working class. Cleaver contends that Althusser's "scientism" and his focus on concepts like the "epistemological break" and "theoretical practice" served to remove class struggle from the center of analysis, thereby creating a "lifeless sociological taxonomy of modes of production" and a "dogmatic scientism" that ignored the actual history of workers' struggles. According to Cleaver, Althusser's structuralist Marxism ultimately provides a "more sophisticated justification for a Marxism–Leninism" in which the party, not the class, is the primary agent of history.

Despite these criticisms, the concepts developed in Reading Capital had wide-ranging implications in numerous fields. The analysis of modes of production and their articulation influenced Marxist anthropology, particularly in the work of Emmanuel Terray and the subsequent debates in Britain around the book Pre-Capitalist Modes of Production (1975). The focus on reproduction also opened up new avenues for feminist theory, providing categories for analyzing the sexual division of labor and the economic function of domestic labor. The book also made possible new analyses of literary and cultural products by providing a method to understand them as relatively autonomous practices rather than simple reflections of a society's economic base.

The book's reception was heavily conditioned by the circulation of the abridged edition. In the Anglophone world, this led to a focus on Althusser's later essays on ideology, while the complex epistemological arguments of Reading Capital were often overlooked. However, in recent years, there has been what Nick Nesbitt calls a "rediscovery of Lire le Capital". This has been spurred by the publication of posthumous works by Althusser and new, complete translations of his major texts. Contemporary analysis tends to situate the book not as an exercise in ideology critique but as a culminating moment in a tradition of 20th-century French epistemology that includes Gaston Bachelard, Jean Cavaillès, and Georges Canguilhem, a rationalist tradition defined by its opposition to phenomenology and philosophies of consciousness. The essays collected in The Concept in Crisis: Reading Capital Today argue for the book's continuing relevance for a "renewed communist philosophy and critique of political economy in the twenty-first century".
