= Allegations of apartheid by country =

Apartheid was a system of racial segregation in South Africa. Allegations of the crime of apartheid have been made about various countries.

== China ==
The privileging of the Han people in ethnic minority areas outside of China proper, such as the Uyghur-majority Xinjiang and the central government's policy of settlement in Tibet, and the alleged erosion of indigenous religion, language and culture through repressive measures (such as the Han Bingtuan militia in Xinjiang) and sinicization have been likened to "cultural genocide" and apartheid by some activists. With regards to Chinese settlements in Tibet, in 1991 the Dalai Lama declared:

The new Chinese settlers have created an alternate society: a Chinese apartheid which, denying Tibetans equal social and economic status in our own land, threatens to finally overwhelm and absorb us.

Additionally, the traditional residential system of hukou has been likened to apartheid due to its classification of 'rural' and 'urban' residency status, and is sometimes likened to a form of caste system. In recent years, the system has undergone reform, with an expansion of urban residency permits in order to accommodate more migrant workers.

== Cuba ==
After the dissolution of the Soviet Union, Cuba faced major economic changes and tourism was regarded as the only stable sector of the Cuban economy, which became the subject of policy changes to enhance its development. Cuba legalized the use of the US dollar and created a dual currency system, one based on the dollar and the Cuban convertible peso with the other system based on the Cuban peso. Different institutions and businesses operated on only one side of the currency divide. The Cuban peso, used mostly by Cuban nationals, could not buy imported goods. The goal of the dual economy was to create one economic sphere designed to use foreign investment, while keeping it separate from the other economic sphere of domestic activities.

The dual economy involved various policies that divided Cuban nationals and foreigners. These systems dividing tourist facilities, currencies, and health care, have been informally termed "tourism apartheid", "dollar apartheid", and "medical apartheid".

== India ==
The maltreatment of Dalits in India has been described by Anand Teltumbde, Gopal Guru and others as "India's hidden apartheid". A 2007 report by Human Rights Watch (HRW) also described the treatment of Dalits as akin to a "hidden apartheid", and that they "endure segregation in housing, schools, and access to public services". HRW noted that Prime Minister of India Manmohan Singh saw a parallel between the crime of apartheid and untouchability.

Although the constitution of India officially abolished untouchability, Klaus Klostermaier argued in 2010 that "they still live in secluded quarters, do the dirtiest work, and are not allowed to use the village well and other common facilities". In the same year, Eleanor Zelliot noted that "In spite of much progress over the last sixty years, Dalits are still at the social and economic bottom of society." According to the 2014 NCAER/University of Maryland survey, 27 percent of the Indian population still practices untouchability; the figure may be higher because many people refuse to acknowledge doing so when questioned, although the methodology of the survey was also criticised for potentially inflating the figure. Across India, untouchability was practised among 52 percent of Brahmins, 33 percent of Other Backward Classes and 24 percent of non-Brahmin forward castes. Untouchability was also practised by people of minority religions – 23 percent of Sikhs, 18 percent of Muslims and 5 percent of Christians.

21st century research by Naveen Bharathi, Deepak Malghan and Andaleeb Rahman found that "the extent of intra-village segregation in Karnataka is greater than the local black-white segregation in the American South that continues to influence residential patterns to this day". They claim that this finding agrees with previous ethnographic research that found that residential space in rural India is segregated along caste lines.

== Iran ==
The Islamic Republic of Iran has been described as maintaining a "religious apartheid", where Muslims have full citizenship rights and three minority religions have less rights or differing rights under the constitution and laws, specifically Christianity, Judaism and Zoroastrianism. Iranians who openly hold to other religion or no religion are alleged to be subject to persecution or arrest, notably those of the Baháʼí faith. Baháʼí youth are not permitted to attend university within Iran and Baháʼí businesses must be "modest", not high-earning and excluded from multiple professional services.

The country has also been described as having a "gender apartheid", where woman are granted less rights and face legal restrictions that do not apply to men, such as in divorce, marital sexuality, domestic violence, inheritance, dress codes and political activism. Males are held to be guardians of their wives under the constitution.

== Israel ==
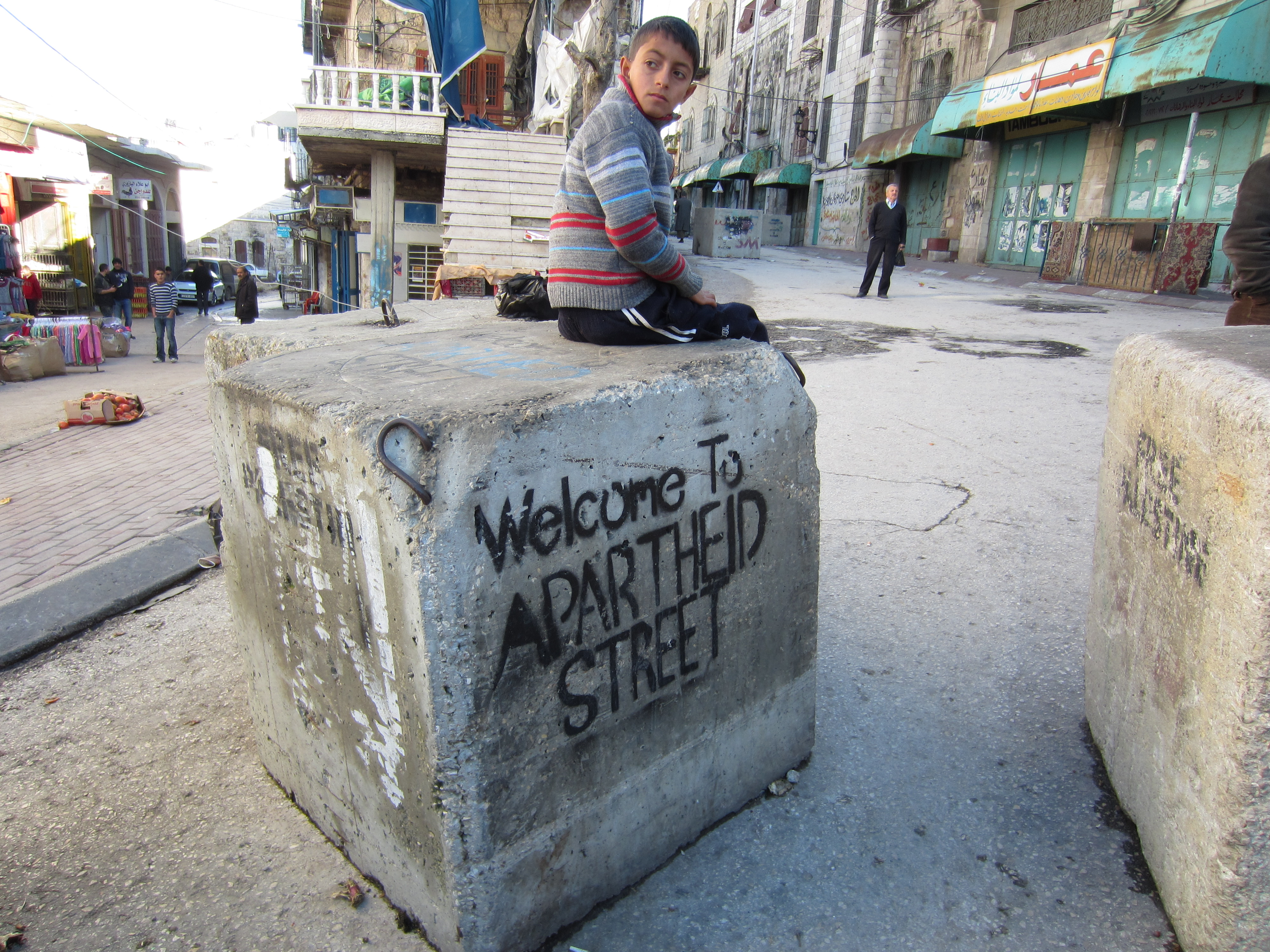
A Palestinian child sitting on a roadblock at Al-Shuhada Street within the Old City of Hebron in the Israeli-occupied West Bank (2013). Palestinians have given the street the moniker "Apartheid Street" because it is closed to Palestinian traffic and open only to Israeli settlers and tourists.

Israeli apartheid is a system of institutionalized segregation and discrimination in the Israeli-occupied Palestinian territories. The system is characterized by near-total physical separation between the Israeli settler and Palestinian populations of the West Bank, as well as the judicial separation that governs both communities, which discriminates against Palestinians in a wide range of ways. Israel also discriminates against Palestinians in the diaspora, including refugees, whose residency and property claims it denies, and against its own Palestinian citizens. (Note: Attributed to multiple references:) Whether apartheid exists in Israel proper is disputed. (Note: "Israel proper" refers to the borders of Israel as recognized by the majority of the international community, which excludes East Jerusalem, the West Bank, the Golan Heights, and the Gaza Strip.)

Since the 1948 Palestine war, Israel has denied Palestinian refugees who were expelled or fled from what became its territory, the right to return to their lost properties. Israel has occupied the West Bank and the Gaza Strip since the 1967 Six-Day War, which is now the longest military occupation in modern history, and, in contravention of international law, has been constructing large settlements there that separate Palestinian communities from one another and prevent the establishment of a Palestinian state. The settlements are mostly encircled by the Israeli West Bank barrier, which intentionally separates the Israeli and Palestinian populations, a policy called Hafrada. Jewish Israeli settlers are subject to Israeli civil law, but the Palestinian population is subject to military law. Settlers also have access to separate roads and exploit the region's natural resources at the expense of its Palestinian inhabitants.

Academic comparisons between Israel-Palestine and South African apartheid were prevalent by the mid-1990s. Since the definition of apartheid as a crime in the 2002 Rome Statute, attention has shifted to the question of international law. In December 2019, the Committee on the Elimination of Racial Discrimination announced it was reviewing the Palestinian complaint that Israel's policies in the West Bank amount to apartheid. Since then, several Israeli, Palestinian, and international human rights organizations have characterized the situation as apartheid, including Yesh Din, B'Tselem, Human Rights Watch, and Amnesty International. This view has been supported by United Nations investigators, the African National Congress (ANC), human rights groups, and many prominent Israeli political and cultural figures. The International Court of Justice in its 2024 advisory opinion found that Israel's occupation of the Palestinian territories constitutes systemic discrimination and is in breach of Article 3 of the International Convention on the Elimination of All Forms of Racial Discrimination, which prohibits racial segregation and apartheid. The opinion did not specify whether it was referring to racial segregation, apartheid, or both.

Elements of Israeli apartheid include the Law of Return, the 2003 Citizenship and Entry into Israel Law, the 2018 Nation-State Law, and many laws regarding security, freedom of movement, land and planning, citizenship, political representation in the Knesset (legislature), education, and culture. Israel says its policies are driven by security considerations, and that the accusation of apartheid is factually and morally inaccurate and intended to delegitimize Israel. It also often calls the charge antisemitic, which critics have in turn called weaponization of antisemitism.

== Malaysia ==
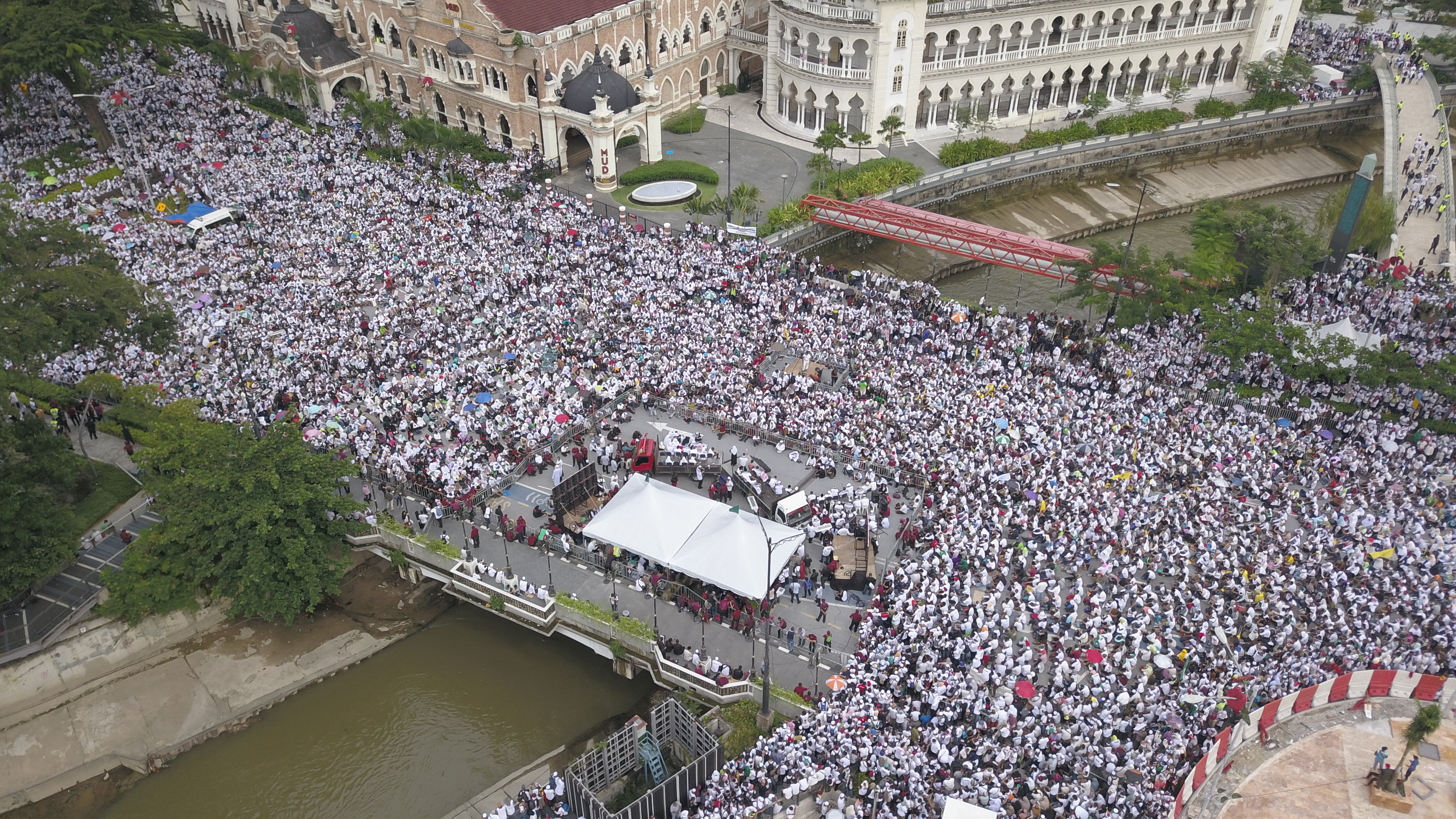
Thousands of Malaysian bumiputeras protesting against the ratification of ICERD

Due to the concept of Ketuanan Melayu enshrined in the country's constitution, which directly translates to "Malay Supremacy", as well as Bumiputera, Malaysia's structural institutions has been noted by many opposition groups, government critics and human rights observers as being analogous to apartheid in various forms. This has been noted specifically against its citizens who are of ethnic Chinese and Indian descent, as well as other various minorities. In Malaysia, a citizen who is not considered to be bumiputera faces obstacles and discrimination in matters such as economic freedom, education, healthcare and housing, leading to a de facto second-class citizen status. Malaysia is also one of the few countries in the world that is not a signatory to the International Convention on the Elimination of All Forms of Racial Discrimination (ICERD). A possible ratification in 2018 led to an anti-ICERD mass rally by Malay supremacists at the country's capital to prevent it, threatening a racial conflict if it does happen.

Examples include in education, in which the country's pre-university matriculation programmes specifically has a 90:10 admissions quota that favours bumiputera students, despite bumiputeras already making up a majority in the country. In addition, government-funded public universities such as Universiti Teknologi MARA (UiTM) exclusively only permits bumiputera citizens as students. In addition, the ownership of land significantly differs between citizens depending on race. For example, numerous plots of land throughout the country, a significant factor needed for housing, are usually reserved only for either bumiputeras and Malays, also known as Bumiputera Lot or Malay Reserved Land (MRL). MRL's are specifically available only for Malays, with even non-Malay bumiputeras not eligible.

In 2006, prominent activist Marina Mahathir described the status of Muslim women in Malaysia as gender apartheid and similar to that of the apartheid system in South Africa. Mahathir's remarks were made in response to a new Islamic law that enables men to divorce or take up to four wives. The law also granted husbands more authority over their wives' property. In response, Conservative groups such as the Malaysian Muslim Professionals Forum (MMPF) criticized her comments for insulting Sharia law. In 2009, politician Boo Cheng Hau compared "bumiputeraism" with state apartheid; as a result Boo faced intense criticisms and death threats by the governing United Malays National Organisation (UMNO), which is a part of the Barisan Nasional (BN) coalition. He was also called into questioning by the Royal Malaysia Police (RMP). In 2015, human rights activist Shafiqah Othman Hamzah also noted that the practice of apartheid policies against different religions in Malaysia is institutionalised and widespread, adding that "What we are living in Malaysia is almost no different from apartheid." In 2021, a group of Malaysian women launched a class-action lawsuit against the government over outdated citizenship laws, which risks trapping women in abusive relationships and can leave children stateless.

Such policies have also caused significant rates of human capital flight or brain drain from Malaysia. A study divulged by Stanford University highlighted that among the main factors behind the Malaysian brain drain include social injustice. It stated that the high rates of emigration of non-bumiputera Malaysians from the country is driven by discriminatory policies that appear to favour Malays/Bumiputeras—such as providing exclusive additional assistance in starting businesses and educational opportunities.

== Myanmar ==
Since Myanmar's transition to relative democratic rule beginning in 2010, the government's response to the Rohingya genocide has been widely condemned, and has been described as an ethnic cleansing by the United Nations, ICC officials, and other governments.

Myanmar's current policies towards the Rohingya population include ethnic segregation, limited access to resources (comparable to the bantustan system), a lack of civil rights, ID card and special permit systems without any guarantee of citizenship (akin to the pass laws), restrictions on movement, and even institutionalized racial definitions, with the Rohingya being officially labelled as "Bengali races". In 2017, Amnesty International issued a report accusing Myanmar of committing the crime of apartheid against the Rohingya. Additionally, the UN has explicitly condemned Myanmar over creating an apartheid state, threatening to withdraw aid from the country.

== Qatar ==
Several human rights groups have compared Qatar's discriminatory treatment of the migrant workers that make up 90% of its population to apartheid.

== Saudi Arabia ==
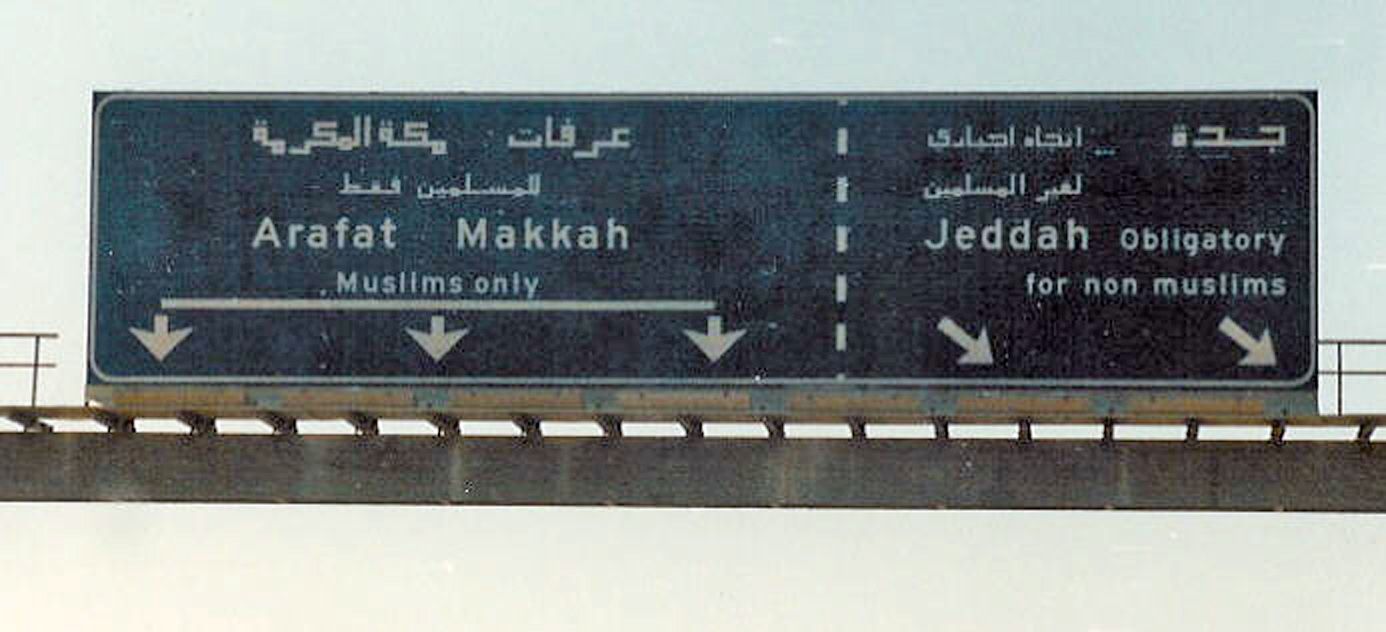
Road sign on a highway into Mecca, stating that one direction is "Muslims only" while another direction is "obligatory for non-Muslims". Religious police are stationed beyond the turnoff on the main road to prevent non-Muslims from proceeding into Mecca and Medina.

Saudi Arabia's treatment of religious minorities has been described by both Saudis and non-Saudis as "apartheid" and "religious apartheid".

The restrictions on the Shia branch of Islam in the Kingdom, along with the banning of displaying Jewish, Hindu and Christian symbols, have been referred to as apartheid. Alan Dershowitz wrote in 2002, "in Saudi Arabia apartheid is practiced against non-Muslims, with signs indicating that Muslims must go to certain areas and non-Muslims to others." In 2003, Amir Taheri quoted a Shi'ite businessman from Dhahran as saying "It is not normal that there are no Shi'ite army officers, ministers, governors, mayors and ambassadors in this kingdom. This form of religious apartheid is as intolerable as was apartheid based on race." Testifying before the U.S. Congressional Human Rights Caucus on 4 June 2002, in a briefing entitled "Human Rights in Saudi Arabia: The Role of Women", Ali Al-Ahmed, Director of the Institute for Gulf Affairs, stated:

Saudi Arabia is a glaring example of religious apartheid. The religious institutions from government clerics to judges, to religious curricula, and all religious instructions in media are restricted to the Wahhabi understanding of Islam, adhered to by less than 40% of the population. The Saudi government communized Islam, through its monopoly of both religious thoughts and practice. Wahhabi Islam is imposed and enforced on all Saudis regardless of their religious orientations. The Wahhabi sect does not tolerate other religious or ideological beliefs, Muslim or not. Religious symbols by Muslims, Christians, Jews and other believers are all banned. The Saudi embassy in Washington is a living example of religious apartheid. In its 50 years, there has not been a single non-Sunni Muslim diplomat in the embassy. The branch of Imam Mohamed Bin Saud University in Fairfax, Virginia instructs its students that Shia Islam is a Jewish conspiracy.

On 14 December 2005, Republican Representative Ileana Ros-Lehtinen and Democratic Representative Shelley Berkley introduced a bill in Congress urging American divestiture from Saudi Arabia, and giving as its rationale (among other things) "Saudi Arabia is a country that practices religious apartheid and continuously subjugates its citizenry, both Muslim and non-Muslim, to a specific interpretation of Islam." Freedom House showed on its website, on a page titled "Religious apartheid in Saudi Arabia", a picture of a sign showing Muslim-only and non-Muslim roads.

In addition, the treatment of women in Saudi Arabia has been referred to as "sex segregation" and a "gender apartheid".

== South Africa ==
The name of the crime comes from a system of racial segregation in South Africa enforced through legislation by the National Party (NP), the governing party from 1948 to 1994. Under apartheid, the rights, associations, and movements of the majority black inhabitants and other ethnic groups were curtailed, and white minority rule was maintained. Notably, South Africa's post-apartheid Constitution does not mention or prohibit the crime of apartheid.

== Soviet Union ==
Special settlements in the Soviet Union were the result of population transfers and were performed in a series of operations organized according to social class or nationality of the deported. Resettling of "enemy classes" such as prosperous peasants and entire populations by ethnicity was a method of political repression in the Soviet Union, although separate from the Gulag system of penal labor. Involuntary settlement played a role in the colonization of virgin lands of the Soviet Union. This role was specifically mentioned in the first Soviet decrees about involuntary labor camps. Compared to the Gulag labor camps, the involuntary settlements had the appearance of "normal" settlements: people lived in families, and there was slightly more freedom of movement; however, that was permitted only within a small specified area. All settlers were overseen by the NKVD; once a month a person had to register at a local law enforcement office at a selsoviet in rural areas or at a militsiya department in urban settlements. As second-class citizens, deported peoples designated as "special settlers" were prohibited from holding a variety of jobs, returning to their region of origin, attending prestigious schools, and even joining the cosmonaut program. Due to this special settlements have been called by J. Otto Pohl a type of apartheid.

== Sudan ==
In early 1991, non-Arabs of the Zaghawa tribe of Sudan attested that they were victims of an intensifying Arab apartheid campaign, segregating Arabs and non-Arabs. Sudanese Arabs, who controlled the government, were widely referred to as practicing apartheid against Sudan's non-Arab citizens. The government was accused of "deftly manipulat(ing) Arab solidarity" to carry out policies of apartheid and ethnic cleansing.

American University economist George Ayittey accused the Arab government of Sudan of practicing acts of racism against black citizens. According to Ayittey, "In Sudan ... the Arabs monopolized power and excluded blacks – Arab apartheid." Many African commentators joined Ayittey in accusing Sudan of practising Arab apartheid.

Alan Dershowitz labeled Sudan an example of a government that "actually deserve(s)" the appellation "apartheid". Former Canadian Minister of Justice Irwin Cotler echoed the accusation.

== United States ==
Some observers have described the United States as an apartheid state based on examples of systemic oppression against African Americans, Native Americans, and other people of color.

A 1994 paper on "The Legacy of American Apartheid and Environmental Racism" by scholar Robert Bullard described housing discrimination, residential segregation, and differential exposure to air pollution as evidence of ongoing "Apartheid American Style". Michelle Alexander has referred to the country's disproportionate incarceration of African Americans as "a form of apartheid unlike any the world has ever seen", since it puts the victims behind bars rather than "merely shunting black people to the other side of town or corralling them in ghettos".

Historian Nick Estes has referred to the United States' history of pushing Indigenous nations onto smaller and smaller reservations as comprising "a new spatial arrangement of apartheid". Journalist Stephanie Woodard argues that the term "apartheid" is "an apt description of the relationship between the United States and its first peoples ... If a tribe wants to build a housing development or protect a sacred site, if a tribal member wants to start a business or plant a field, a federal agency can modify or scuttle the plans. Conversely, if a corporation or other outside interest covets reservation land or resources, the federal government becomes an obsequious bondservant, helping the non-Native entity get what it wants at bargain-basement prices."

Legal scholar Steven Newcomb has argued that, since the Supreme Court decided Johnson v. McIntosh in 1823, federal law has officially endorsed "a doctrine of Christian dominion over the American Indian". The decision, which has never been overturned, established a "doctrine of discovery" that gave Europeans full sovereignty over land that had been inhabited by Indigenous people. Newcomb asserts that the decision's author John Marshall applied a "double standard" by denying sovereignty rights to the prior and original discoverers. Based on the decision's reference to the discovery rights of "Christian people" and on the account of Marshall's Supreme Court colleague Joseph Story, Newcomb establishes that the Johnson decision is based in Christian law, specifically the 1493 papal bull Inter caetera. Newcomb concludes that the doctrine of discovery violates federal law's separation of church and state.

== Turkey ==
Several Turkish historians and political scholars have characterized Turkey as an apartheid state, arguing that its political and legal institutions were founded upon systematic ethnic, religious, and cultural discrimination that persists into the present. Taner Akçam traces the system to the Turkish War of Independence and the establishment of the republic during the Turkish National Movement between 1918 and 1923, arguing that the new state combined the religious hierarchies of the Ottoman millet system with ethnic Turkish nationalism and colonial practices, creating a three-tiered hierarchy of citizenship: Sunni Muslim Turks at the top, Alevis and non-Turkish Muslims in an intermediate category, and Christians and Jews at the bottom. Proponents cite legislation and administrative practices that excluded Christians from certain parliamentary elections, confiscated Christian properties, restricted the residence and movements of Christians, classified and surveilled citizens according to ethnic ancestry. Kılıçdağı emphasizes that these practices constituted institutionalized discrimination embedded in laws, decrees, and administrative directives rather than isolated incidents of prejudice, citing parliamentary proceedings revealing deliberate efforts to deny Christian citizens restitution for confiscated property. Akçam further distinguishes between the forced assimilation of non-Turkish Muslims and the enduring exclusion of Christians and Jews, arguing that these policies institutionalized unequal citizenship. Köker endorses the characterization, arguing that the discriminatory order was integral to the founding of Turkey rather than a subsequent deviation from its principles, while Akçam maintains that understanding Turkey's history through the establishment of apartheid, rather than exclusively through national liberation, is essential.

== Sources ==
- Adam, Heribert; Moodley, Kogila (2005). Seeking Mandela: Peacemaking between Israelis and Palestinians. Philadelphia: Temple University Press. ISBN 978-1-59213-396-3. OCLC 56955855.
