= Warren Montag =

American academic

Warren Montag (born March 21, 1952) (Note: Birth date is from LCNAF's CIP data) is an American academic of English literature who is a professor of English at Occidental College in Los Angeles, California. He is known primarily for his work on twentieth-century French theory, especially Althusser and his circle, as well as his studies of the philosophers Spinoza, Locke, and Hobbes.

== Work ==
Montag's work has focused on the origins and internal contradictions of political liberalism and individualism, and has demonstrated, following the suggestions of Étienne Balibar, the existence of "a fear of the masses" (or multitude) in the classic texts of seventeenth century liberal thought. More recently, he has shifted to a study of the emergence of the concept of the market in the work of Adam Smith. Montag received his B.A. from the University of California, Berkeley and his M.A. and Ph.D. from Claremont Graduate University. He has published three books and three edited collections, has translated many essays by Althusser and published more than forty essays. He resides in Los Angeles and is married with two children.

== Publications ==
- (Co-Editor) Systems of Life: Biopolitics, Economics, and Literature, 1750-1859 (New York: Fordham University Press, 2018).
- (Co-Editor) Balibar and the Citizen Subject (Edinburgh: Edinburgh University Press, 2017).
- (Co-Written) The Other Adam Smith (Stanford University Press, 2014).
- Althusser and His Contemporaries: Philosophy's Perpetual War (Duke University Press, 2013).
- Louis Althusser. (London: Palgrave, 2002).
- (Co-Editor) Masses, Classes and The Public Sphere. (London: Verso, 2001).
- Bodies, Masses, Power: Spinoza and his Contemporaries. (London: Verso, Spring 1999). (Spanish translation, Ediciones Tierra de Nadie, 2005; Italian translation, Edizioni Ghibili, forthcoming).
- (Ed) In a Materialist Way: Selected Essays by Pierre Macherey. (London: Verso, 1998).
- (Co-Editor) The New Spinoza. (Minneapolis: University of Minnesota Press, 1997).
- The Unthinkable Swift: The Spontaneous Philosophy of a Church of England Man. (London: Verso, 1994).
