= Louis Althusser and the Traditions of French Marxism =

2005 book by William S. Lewis

- Cover of the first edition
- Author: William S. Lewis
- Language: English
- Subject: Louis Althusser
- Publisher: Lexington Books
- Publication date: 2005
- Publication place: United States
- Media type: Print (Hardcover and Paperback)
- Pages: 238
- ISBN: 0-7391-1307-0

Louis Althusser and the Traditions of French Marxism is a 2005 book about the French philosopher Louis Althusser by William S. Lewis. The book received positive reviews. Lewis was complimented for his inclusion of translated documents of the French Communist Party.

== Summary ==
Lewis discusses the French philosopher Louis Althusser, his interpretation of the philosopher Karl Marx, and his relationship with the French Communist Party. He examines works of Althusser such as For Marx (1965), Reading Capital (1965), and Lenin and Philosophy and Other Essays (1968). He also discusses the work of other French philosophers, such as Henri Lefebvre, Alexandre Kojève, Georges Politzer, Jean Hyppolite, Jean-Paul Sartre, Maurice Merleau-Ponty, and René Maublanc, and the relationship between Marxism and epistemology.

== Publication history ==
Louis Althusser and the Traditions of French Marxism was published in 2005 by Lexington Books.

== Reception ==
Louis Althusser and the Traditions of French Marxism received positive reviews from Hasana Sharp in the Journal of Speculative Philosophy and Panagiotis Sotiris in Historical Materialism, and a mixed review from Bruce Baugh in Notre Dame Philosophical Reviews. It was also reviewed by Chamsy el-Ojeili in Thesis Eleven and the economist Richard D. Wolff in Science & Society. In Borderlands E-Journal: New Spaces in the Humanities, David McInerney reviewed the book and interviewed Lewis about it.

Sharp considered the book a welcome addition to the literature on Althusser, noting that Lewis translated documents from the French Communist Party "that would otherwise be entirely unavailable." She complimented Lewis for his treatment of Althusser's philosophy and its relevance to "long-standing debates" about knowledge, but disagreed with his view that Althusser's description of philosophy and science was "excessively rationalist and conventionalist", observing that it was "really an affirmation of a criticism levied by others".

Sotiris credited Lewis with providing a "balanced and insightful" assessment of Althusser. He endorsed Lewis's view that Althusser's work was "a response to the crisis of French Marxism" and an effort to intervene in both the theoretical debate and the political orientation of the French Communist Party. He also complimented Lewis for his treatment of Lefebvre and Merleau-Ponty, crediting him with showing "their inadequacy to theorise social totality and their distance from Marx’s original formulations." However, he expressed disagreement with Lewis's view of Althusser's stance on epistemology, and his view that Althusser’s work can be used "to refute the epistemological primacy of the proletariat."

Baugh considered Lewis's account of the intellectual development of the French Communist Party "clear and mostly unobjectionable", though he also considered it largely unoriginal. He complimented Lewis for his inclusion of translations of excerpts from PCF publications and from the work of Maublanc. However, he criticized his discussion of French Marxist thought in the period prior to 1956, arguing that Lewis established a "a false alternative between Stalinist French Marxism ... and humanist Marxism" in order to present an overly-favorable view of Althusser and overstate his importance to French Marxism. He also criticized Lewis's treatment of Lefebvre, Merleau-Ponty, Sartre, Kojève, and Hyppolite.
