= Second-class citizen =

Those discriminated against by the state

A second-class citizen is a person who is systematically and actively discriminated against within a state or other political jurisdiction, despite their nominal status as a citizen or a legal resident there. While not necessarily slaves, outlaws, illegal immigrants, or criminals, second-class citizens have significantly limited legal rights, civil rights and socioeconomic opportunities, and are often subject to mistreatment and exploitation at the hands of their putative superiors. Systems with de facto second-class citizenry are widely regarded as violating human rights.

Typical conditions facing second-class citizens include but are not limited to:

- disenfranchisement (a lack or loss of voting rights)
- limitations on civil service and/or exclusion from military forces
- restrictions on language, religion, education
- lack of freedom of movement, expression, and association
- limitations on the right to keep and bear arms
- restrictions on marriage
- restrictions on housing
- restrictions on property ownership
- mandatory military service (conscription)

Citizenship and nationality have essential imbued rights that define them, and some commentators argue that having second-class citizenship may amount to statelessness. As an example, Nazi Germany's Reich Citizenship Law of 1935 created a second-class citizenship status, which was used for anyone excluded from the "Reich Citizenship." On paper, the holders of the second-class citizenship "enjoyed the protection of the state and were bound to fulfill all the duties of citizenship," but in practice the status was worse than that for aliens, allowing any form of discrimination and other maltreatment against the holders, effectively nullifying the defining function of citizenship. There is much debate as to where to draw the line on defining second-class citizenship and whether it amounts to statelessness. The category remains unofficial and mostly academic, and is generally used as a pejorative by commentators.

Governments will typically deny the existence of a second class within its polity, and as an informal category, second-class citizenship is not objectively measured. Cases such as the Southern United States under racial segregation and Jim Crow laws, the repression of Aboriginal citizens in Australia prior to 1967, deported ethnic groups designated as "special settlers" in the Soviet Union, Latvian and Estonian non-citizen minorities, the apartheid regime in South Africa, women in Saudi Arabia under Saudi Sharia law, and Roman Catholics in Northern Ireland during the Parliamentary era are all examples of groups that have been historically described as having second-class citizenry and being victims of state-sponsored discrimination.

Historically, before the mid-20th century, this policy was applied by several European colonial empires on colonial residents of overseas possessions.

A resident alien or foreign national, and children in general, fit most definitions of a second-class citizen. This does not mean that they do not have any legal protections, nor do they lack acceptance by the local population, but they lack many of the civil rights commonly given to the dominant social group. A naturalized citizen, on the other hand, essentially carries the same rights and responsibilities as any other citizen, except for possible exclusion from certain public offices, and is also legally protected.

== Relationship with citizenry class ==
| Citizenry class | Freedoms | Limitations | Legal status |
|---|---|---|---|
| Full and equal citizenship | Freedom to reside and work, freedom to enter and leave the country, freedom to vote, freedom to stand for public office | No limitations | Internationally recognized |
| Second-class citizenry | Restrictions on freedom of language, religion, education, property ownership, and other material or social needs. | Largely limited | Internationally recognized |
| Non-citizens | Rights are neither given nor withdrawn from the individual. | Non-Assessable | Internationally recognized |
| Outlaws, criminals | No rights to outlaws, or criminals in normal citizenry classes, however, certain countries have constitutional sets and legal standards for criminals and outlaws | Completely limited | Widely unrecognized |

== Examples ==
- Christian minorities in the Ottoman Empire (e.g., Armenians, Greeks, Assyrians) were second-class citizens. This was legally codified under the millet system, which subjected them to higher taxes (like the jizya) and restrictions on public religious expression, political participation, land ownership, and military service.
- Latvian non-citizens constitute a group similar to second-class citizens. Although they are not considered foreigners (they hold no other citizenship, have Latvian IDs), they have reduced rights compared to full citizens. For example, non-citizens are not eligible to vote or hold public office. The European Commission against Racism and Intolerance has described their status as making "people concerned feel like "second-class citizens". Estonian non-citizens are in a similar position.
- In Malaysia, as part of the concept of Ketuanan Melayu (lit. Malay supremacy), a citizen that is not considered to be of Bumiputera status may face roadblocks and discrimination in matters such as economic freedom, education and housing.
- Mainland Chinese citizens who are settling in Hong Kong or Macau by means of a one-way permit do not have citizenship rights (such as obtaining a passport) in both the mainland or the SAR after settling but before obtaining the permanent resident status, effectively rendering them second-class citizens.
- Special permanent resident (特別永住者) is a type of Japanese resident with ancestry usually related to its former colonies, Korea or Taiwan. They are usually afforded additional rights and privileges beyond those of normal Permanent Residents, but are still unable to vote in Japanese elections.
- The burakumin (部落民, 'hamlet/village people') are a social grouping of Japanese people descended from members of the feudal class associated with kegare (穢れ, 'impurity'), mainly those with occupations related to death such as executioners, gravediggers, slaughterhouse workers, butchers, and tanners. Burakumin are physically indistinguishable from other Japanese but have historically been regarded as a socially distinct group. When identified, they are often subject to discrimination and prejudice. They are often called eta (穢多, "great filth") or hinin (非人, "non-persons"). Although liberated legally during 1871 with the abolition of the feudal caste system, this did not end social discrimination against burakumin nor improve their living standards. Outside of the Kansai region, people in general are often not aware of the issues experienced by those of buraku ancestry. Prejudice against buraku most often manifests itself in the form of marriage discrimination and sometimes in employment.
- The British Nationality Act 1981 reclassified the British national classes as British Overseas Territories citizen, British Nationals (Overseas) and British Overseas citizens in addition to British citizens. Martin Lee referred to it as "One country, six citizenships". The creation of British Nationals (Overseas) (BNO) class was satirized as "British NO" by some Hong Kong media. Despite its status as a British national, holders do not have the right of residence in the United Kingdom, with its application and status similar to a general Commonwealth citizen of other sovereign countries.
- Apartheid in South Africa between 1948 and 1991 was a nationwide institutional racially segregated multi-level system in which European residents of the nation had more rights and privileges than Indians, who in turn had more rights than those of mixed descent, who had more rights than the majority of the population, namely Black Africans. This segregation included having separate events for those of different races, separate walkways and modes of transportation, separate hospitals, Black Africans being banned from voting, and compelling those of separate races to live in separate townships. The international condemnation of apartheid that led to its end largely began in the aftermath of the Sharpeville massacre, in which 69 protesters were killed and more than 175 were injured when police opened fire on a crowd of thousands on March 21, 1960.
- The Bedoons in Kuwait, the "untouchable" Dalits in India, and some ethnic minorities in China are sometimes referred to as second-class citizens.
- Heribert Adam and Kogila Moodley wrote in 2006 that Israeli Palestinians are "restricted to second-class citizen status when another ethnic group monopolizes state power" because of legal prohibitions on access to land, as well as the unequal allocation of civil service positions and per capita expenditure on educations between "dominant and minority citizens".
- The U.S. Supreme Court ruled that a naturalized person could not be stripped of her citizenship because she resided abroad, saying of the federal statute, "It creates indeed a second-class citizenship." The court said, "We start from the premise that the right of citizenship of the native born and of the naturalized person are of the same dignity and are coextensive. The only difference drawn by the Constitution is that only the 'natural born' citizen is eligible to be President." Schneider v. Rusk (1964), 377 U.S. 163 (Click the link and scroll down to page 163 in the .pdf.)

== See also ==
- Blacklisting
- Dégradation nationale
- Dhimmi and Dhimmitude
- Involuntary unemployment
- Loss of rights due to felony conviction
- Reverse discrimination
- Untouchability
