= Terray =

Terray is a surname. Notable people with the surname include:

- Emmanuel Terray (1935–2024), French anthropologist and political activist
- Joseph Marie Terray (1715–1778), French politician
- Lionel Terray (1921–1965), French climber
