= Pierre Macherey =

French philosopher (born 1938)

- Born: 17 February 1938 (age 88); Belfort, France

Education
- Education: École Normale Supérieure
- Academic advisor: Louis Althusser

Philosophical work
- Era: Contemporary philosophy
- Region: Western philosophy
- School: Continental philosophy Structural Marxism; Marxist literary criticism
- Institutions: Paris I Lille III
- Main interests: History of philosophy Literary theory
- Notable ideas: The literary work as ideological production

Pierre Macherey (French: [maʃrɛ]; born 17 February 1938) is a French philosopher and literary theorist at the University of Lille Nord de France. A former student of Louis Althusser and contributor to Reading Capital, he is a key figure in French post-structuralism and Marxist philosophy. His work has influenced literary criticism and continental philosophy in Europe, including Britain, but is generally little read in the United States.

== Scholarly work ==
Macherey is known for his contribution to Reading Capital and his influential work in Marxist literary criticism, especially his account of the literary work as ideological production.

Since 2000, he has participated in "La Philosophie au sens large" (Philosophy in the grand sense), a collaborative project hosted on Hypotheses.org since 2009. Collecting essays, presentations, and longer studies, the project examines how philosophy is conditioned by literary, political, artistic, and social-scientific thought, aiming to reformulate the problem of practice. Macharey describes philosophy in this "grand sense" as "a conjectural practice" that reflects on and elucidates the conditions shaping it in order to intervene in and contribute to their transformation.

== Works ==
Only a partial selection of Macherey's work has been translated into English.

- "The Productive Subject", Viewpoint Magazine 5 (October 2015)
- Reading Capital (1965; with Louis Althusser, Étienne Balibar and Jacques Rancière)
- Pour un théorie de la production littéraire (1966). Translated as A Theory of Literary Production (1978), ISBN 0-415-04613-0
- Hegel ou Spinoza, Maspéro, 1977 (reed. La Découverte, 2004)
- Hegel et la société, PUF (1984)
- The Object of Literature (1995), ISBN 0-521-47678-X
- In a Materialist Way: Selected Essays (1998 ed. Warren Montag): ISBN 1-85984-949-0
- Hegel or Spinoza, University of Minnesota Press (2012). Translator, Susan M. Ruddick.
