= Discontinuity (postmodernism) =

Foucault's description of things no longer known in the same way

According to Michel Foucault, discontinuity and continuity reflect the flow of history and the fact that some "things are no longer perceived, described, expressed, characterised, classified, and known in the same way" from one era to the next (1964).

== Explanation ==
In developing the theory of archaeology of knowledge, Foucault was trying to analyse the fundamental codes which a culture uses to construct the episteme or configuration of knowledge that determines the empirical orders and social practices of each particular historical era. He adopted discontinuity as a positive working tool. Some of the discourse would be regular and continuous over time as knowledge steadily accumulates and society gradually establishes what will constitute truth or reason for the time being. But, in a transition from one era to the next, there will be overlaps, breaks and discontinuities as society reconfigures the discourse to match the new environment.

The tool is given an expanded role in genealogy, the next phase of discourse analysis, where the intention is to grasp the total complexity of the use of power and the effects it produces. Foucault sees power as the means for constituting individuals’ identities and determining the limits of their autonomy. This reflects the symbiotic relationship between power (pouvoir) and knowledge (savoir). In his study of prisons and hospitals, he observed how the modern individual becomes both an object and subject of knowledge. Science emerges as a means of directing and shaping lives. Hence, the modern conception of sexuality emerges from Christian codes of morality, the science of psychology, the laws and enforcement strategies adopted by the police and judiciary, the way in which issues of sexuality are discussed in the public media, the education system, etc.

== See also ==
- Epistemological rupture – Concept of knowledge theory
