= Christian Baudelot =

French sociologist

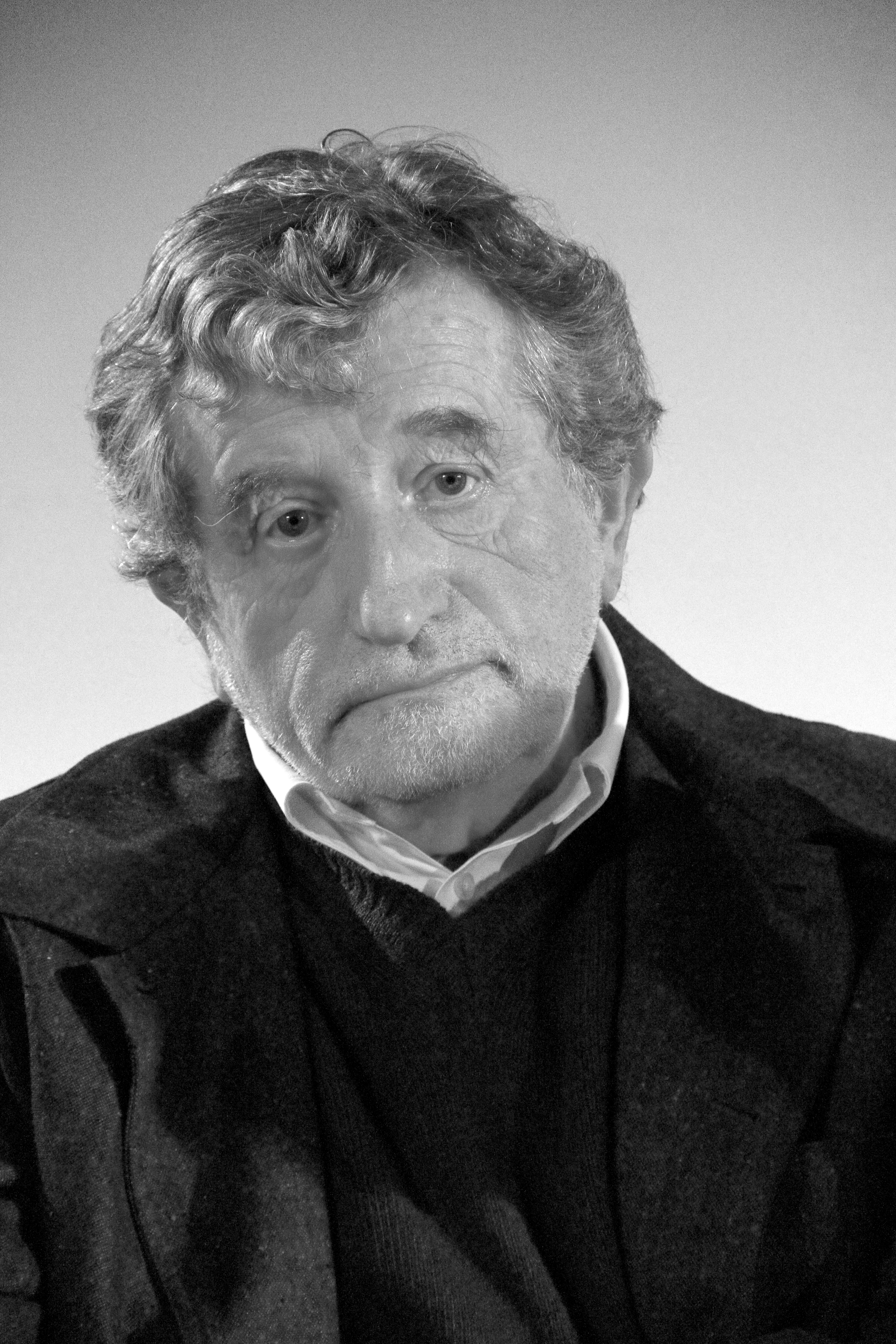
Christian Baudelot, 2013.

Christian Baudelot (born 9 December 1938 in Paris) is a French sociologist based at the École normale supérieure. Many of his works have been written in collaboration with Roger Establet.

== Biography ==
A specialist in education and the Sociology of work, he is professor emeritus of sociology in the Social Sciences Department of the École normale supérieure (Paris) and a researcher at the Maurice-Halbwachs Centre (French National Centre for Scientific Research/School for Advanced Studies in the Social Sciences/École normale supérieure (Paris)). An alumnus of the École normale supérieure de la rue d'Ulm (1960–1964), he holds an agrégation in classics and a doctorate in sociology.

Christian Baudelot has published a number of works, often in collaboration with Roger Establet, including L'école capitaliste en France (Maspero, 1971), Le niveau monte (Seuil, 1989), Allez les filles (Éditions du Seuil, 1992), Suicide, l'envers de notre monde (Seuil, 2006).

In the first part of his career, he was close to Louis Althusser. His work was initially part of the Marxist intellectual landscape of the sixties and seventies. His early work in the Sociology of education, in conjunction with the works of Pierre Bourdieu and Jean-Claude Passeron (Les héritiers, 1964; La reproduction, 1970), sought to highlight the social inequalities reproduced by the school system.

From 1968 to 1989, he was a professor at the ENSAE Paris(Ensae). It contributes to the dissemination of sociological culture among future statistician-surveyors at the Institut national de la statistique et des études économiques(INSEE), but above all to the development of a reflective approach and the theoretical foundations for the production of French public statistics.

In the second part of his work,Marxism ideology becomes less present, giving way to a more Émile Durkheim sociology of the struggle against preconceptions: Le niveau monte (with Roger Establet, Seuil, 1989), Et pourtant, ils lisent... (with Marie Cartier and Christine Detrez, Seuil, 1999), Suicide. L'envers de notre monde (with Roger Establet, Seuil, 2006).

Confronted with his wife Olga's chronic kidney disease, he donated one of his kidneys to her in 2006. Sensitized by this experience, he became involved in patient movements, with the Renaloo association, of which he became vice-president, and as co-founder of the Demain la Greffe think-tank.

In 2007, he signed the “appel des intellectuels” calling for a vote for Ségolène Royal.

== Works ==
- (tr. with Pierre Clinquart) Anthropologie by Edward Sapir, 1967.
- (with Roger Establet) L'ecole capitaliste en France, 1971
- (with Roger Establet and Jacques Malemort) La petite bourgeoisie en France, 1974
- (with Roger Establet, Jacques Toiser and P. O Flavigny) Qui travaille pour qui, 1979
- (with Roger Establet) Durkheim et le suicide, 1984
- (with Roger Establet) Le Niveau monte, 1989
- (with Roger Establet) Allez les filles!, 1992
- (with Roger Establet) Maurice Halbwachs: consommation et société, 1994
- (with M. Gollac, Céline Bessière et al) Travailler pour être heureux? le bonheur et le travail en France, 2003
- (with Roger Establet) Suicide: l'envers de notre monde, 2006. Translated into English as Suicide: The Hidden Side of Modernity, 2008
- (ed. with Marie Jaisson) Maurice Halbwachs, sociologue retrouvé, 2007
- (with Roger Establet) L'élitisme républicain: l'école française à l'épreuve des comparaisons internationales, 2009

== Bibliography ==
- Cécile Daumas, "Le don de soi", Libération, 6 February 2010.
