= European apartheid =

European apartheid is a term coined by French sociologist Étienne Balibar in 1999 to describe how the introduction of European citizenship produced two classes of people in the European Union, those who had European citizenship and those who lacked it. Balibar questioned the self-image of the "new Europe" that it had rejected colonialism and imperialism. He argued that largely non-white, long-term immigrants to Europe were in danger of becoming a permanent underclass if they were cut off from the benefits of citizenship, a situation which would resemble South African apartheid. Balibar believed that it was unclear at the time whether Europe would develop into such an apartheid system, or be able to create a non-segregated society. The term was originally intended to highlight how many of the European Union's protections only apply to European citizens, but has also come to describe the harms of increasingly draconian European Union border policies against non-European citizens. According to Dimitry Kochenov, European apartheid is "at the core of the EU integration project" and "a natural outflow of the EU’s colonial past". Koen Leurs and Sandra Ponzanesi state that European apartheid derives in part from refusal to acknowledge Europe's present multicultural reality, while also ignoring Europe's colonial past. Colonies geographically outside of Europe have not been included in European history, enabling colonial violence to be ignored while telling the story of the European project and its supposed values. Andreas Hieronymus compares Europe's migration regime to the White Australia policy arguing that the two have substantial similarities.

European apartheid has also been used to describe treatment of Romani people.

== See also ==
- Global apartheid
