= Roger Establet =

French sociologist (1938–2026)

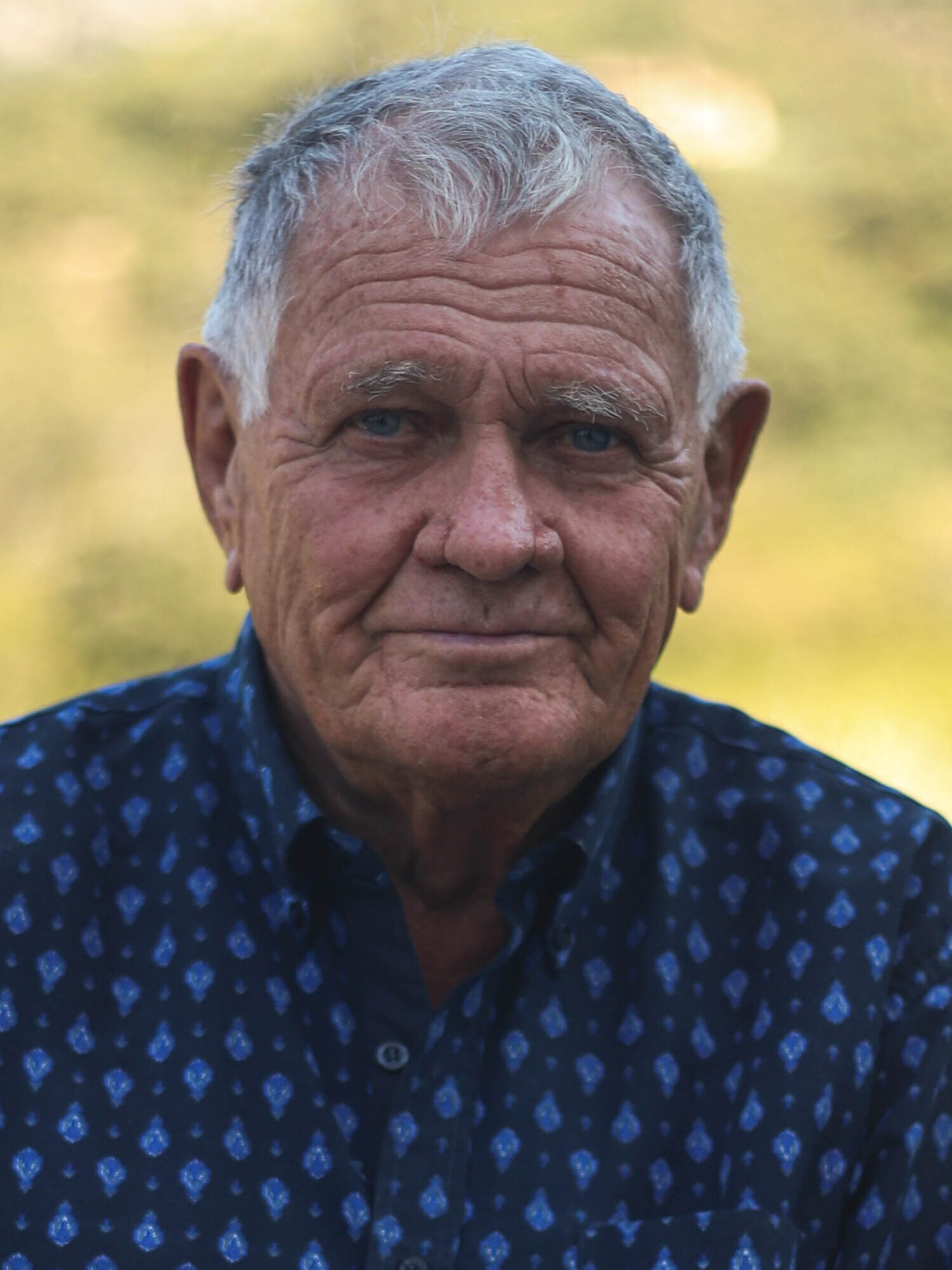
Portrait of Roger Establet

Roger Establet Polity (1938 – 8 April 2026) was a French scholar of the sociology of education. A student of Louis Althusser, Establet was an emeritus professor at University of Provence.

== Life and career ==
A student at the lycée in Nice, and khâgne at the Lycée Louis-le-Grand in Paris, in 1959 he entered the Ecole Normale Supérieure, where he earned degrees in philosophy and sociology. He often collaborated with Christian Baudelot, a sociologist at the École normale supérieure. He was involved in Althusser's Reading Capital project. Establet died on 8 April 2026.

== Works ==
- L'École capitaliste en France, 1970 (with Christian Baudelot)
- Le niveau monte (with Christian Baudelot)
- (with Christian Baudelot) Suicide: The Hidden Side of Modernity (2008). ISBN 9780745640563
