= For Marx =

1965 book by Louis Althusser

- Cover of the first edition
- Author: Louis Althusser
- Original title: Pour Marx
- Translator: Ben Brewster
- Language: French
- Subject: Karl Marx
- Publisher: François Maspero, Allen Lane
- Publication date: 1965
- Publication place: France
- English publication date: 1969
- Media type: Print (Hardcover and Paperback)
- Pages: 258 (first edition)
- ISBN: 978-1844670529

For Marx (French: Pour Marx) is a 1965 book by the philosopher Louis Althusser, a leading theoretician of the French Communist Party (PCF). The book reinterprets the work of the philosopher Karl Marx, proposing an epistemological break between the young, Hegelian Marx, and the old Marx, the author of Das Kapital (1867–1883). The book was first published in France by François Maspero. The texts presented in For Marx are theoretical interventions in a definite conjuncture, particularly aiming at the definition of the lines to be pursued by the PCF after Stalin's years in the Soviet Union. Althusser's position is of theoretical antihumanism, and is against the teleology of history. Althusser defends that history is a process without subject and with an open end, but that has determinations that can be theorized by the science of history as constructed by Marx in his mature work, Das Kapital. Society is then conceptualized as a complex whole articulated in dominance by the economy where several social practices co-exist with a relative autonomy, introducing the concept overdetermination to characterize the levels of effectivity.

== Background, contents and publication history ==
The book is composed of the following essays:

To My English Readers

Introduction: Today

1. Feuerbach’s ‘Philosophical Manifestoes’

2. ‘On the Young Marx’

3. Contradiction and Overdetermination

4. The ‘Piccolo Teatro’: Bertolazzi and Brecht

5. The ‘1844 Manuscripts’ of Karl Marx

6. On the Materialist Dialectic

7. Marxism and Humanism

== See also ==
- Louis Althusser and the Traditions of French Marxism
