= Heribert Adam =

German-Canadian university professor and author

Heribert Adam FRSC
- Born: 1936; Germany
- Spouse: Kogila Moodley

Academic background
- Education: Frankfurt School
- Thesis: (1965)
- Doctoral advisor: Theodor W. Adorno

Academic work
- Discipline: Sociology
- Sub-discipline: Political sociology
- Institutions: Simon Fraser University
- Main interests: Ethnonationalism, human rights

Heribert Adam FRSC (born 1936) is a German-Canadian university professor and author. Adam is professor emeritus of political sociology at Simon Fraser University, specializing in human rights, comparative racisms, peace studies, Southern Africa, and ethnic conflict. Originally from Frankfurt, Germany, he is a former president of the International Sociological Association's Research Committee on Ethnic, Minority and Race Relations.

Adam is noted for his work on ethnonationalism, which aims at understanding intergroup conflict and fostering a human rights culture that minimizes bigotry and communal strife.

Adam was awarded the Konrad Adenauer Research Award in 1998 for a project on how democracies deal with crimes they have committed in the past. He was elected a fellow of the Royal Society of Canada in 2000. The Society wrote of his work: "Mainly drawing upon Nazi Germany and Apartheid South Africa—where he has been involved in facilitating the 'negotiated revolution'—his nuanced analysis of anti-Semitism, colonial racism, and Canadian treatment of minorities goes beyond the conventional preaching of tolerance. Nelson Mandela in prison praised his work."

Adams was born in Germany. He is married to Kogila Moodley, Professor of Anthropology and Sociology of Education at the University of British Columbia, who is co-author of his book Seeking Mandela: Peacemaking Between Israeli and Palestinians and other works.

== Selected publications ==
- with Moodley, Kogila. Seeking Mandela: Peacemaking Between Israelis and Palestinians. PA: Temple University Press, 2005.
- with van Zyl Slabbert, F & Moodley, Kogila. Comrades in Business. Post-Liberation Politics in South Africa. Cape Town: Tafelberg, 1997. Third edition 1999. Also published by: International Books, Utrecht, 1998.
- with Moodley, Kogila. The Opening of the Apartheid Mind: Options for the New South Africa. Berkeley: University of California Press, 1993. Published in South Africa as The Negotiated Revolution: Society and Politics in Post-Apartheid South Africa, Johannesburg: Jonathan Ball, 1993.
- with Moodley, Kogila. South Africa Without Apartheid. Dismantling Racial Domination. Berkeley: University of California Press, 1986. Expanded German edition: Edition Suhrkamp. NF 369, 1987. Second edition 1988.
- with Giliomee, H. Ethnic Power Mobilized. New Haven: Yale University Press, 1979. Afrikaans edition, 1981.
- Modernizing Racial Domination. The Dynamics of South African Politics. Berkeley: University of California Press, 1971. Third edition, 1976.
- "Anti-Semitism and Anti-Black Racism: Nazi Germany and Apartheid South Africa". Telos 108 (Summer 1996). New York: Telos Press.

== See also ==
- List of German Canadians
