= Kogila Moodley =

Canadian academic

- Spouse: Heribert Adam

Academic work
- Discipline: Sociology
- Institutions: University of British Columbia
- Main interests: Multiculturalism, anti-racism

Kogila Moodley is a published academic and sociologist at the University of British Columbia, where she was the first holder of the David Lam Chair of Multicultural Studies. She serves on the board of directors of the International Sociological Association's Race Relations Committee, and was its president from (1998–2002).

Raised in the Indian community of apartheid South Africa, her expertise is focused on multiculturalism, anti-racism and ethnic and race relations. Moodley also researches Canadian educational and immigration policy, and political and economic developments in South Africa and the Middle East.

She is married to Heribert Adam, with whom she co-authored several books:

- Adam, Heribert; Kogila Moodley (2005). Seeking Mandela: Peacemaking Between Israelis and Palestinians. Temple University Press. p. 224. 1592133967.
- Heribert, Adam; Kogila Moodley; Frederik van Zyl (1998). Comrades in Business: Post-Liberation Politics in South Africa. International Books. p. 240. 9057270226.
- Adam, Heribert; Kogila Moodley (1993). The Opening of the Apartheid Mind: Options for the New South Africa. University of California Press. pp. 277. ISBN 9780520081994. 0520081994.
- Adam, Heribert; Kogila Moodley (1986). South Africa Without Apartheid: Dismantling Racial Domination. University of California Press. 0520081994.

In addition, she has authored the following works:

- Moodley, Kogila (1992). Beyond Multicultural Education: International Perspectives. Detselig Enterprises. 15550590294.
- "The End of Apartheid: The Federalization of South Africa". Telos 92 (Summer 1992). New York: Telos Press.
