= Theoreticism =

In philosophy and particularly political philosophy, theoreticism is the preference for theory over practice (or, more broadly, abstract knowledge over concrete action), or a philosophical position which would lead to such a preference.

The term is often used pejoratively. In Marxist philosophy, for instance, theoreticism is often identified as a political error, valorizing the efforts of academic Marxism over those of revolutionary struggle. Louis Althusser, for instance, criticized his own early work for theoreticism. In phenomenology, theoreticism would be something closer to the over-valuing of knowledge at the cost of losing proper appreciation of experience. Martin Heidegger claimed this trend was begun by Plato, and that it continued in an "intensification and hardening of 'theoreticism', the drive toward technical and objectifying modes of knowledge and, with it, the oblivion of any more primordial or more reverential kind of existence."

== See also ==
- Theoretician (Marxism)
