= Étienne Balibar =

French philosopher (born 1942)

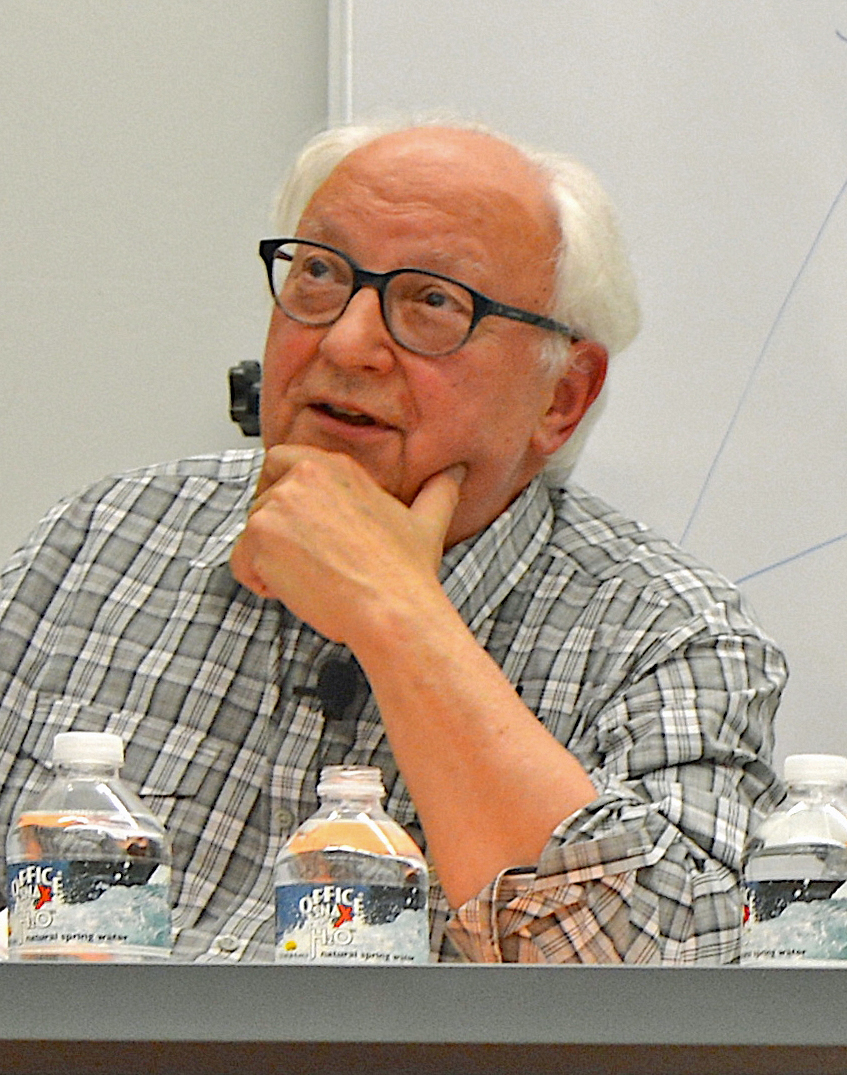
- Born: 23 April 1942 (age 84); Avallon, Burgundy, France
- Political party: PCF (1961–1981)

Education
- Education: École Normale Supérieure; Katholieke Universiteit Nijmegen (PhD, 1987)
- Academic advisor: Louis Althusser

Philosophical work
- Era: Contemporary philosophy
- Region: Western philosophy
- School: Continental philosophy Structural Marxism (early); Post-Marxism
- Institutions: University of Paris X University of California, Irvine; Kingston University; Columbia University
- Main interests: Political philosophy
- Notable ideas: Equaliberty, European apartheid, critique of modern conceptions of the nation-state

Étienne Balibar (/bælɪˈbɑːr/; French: [etjɛn balibaʁ]; born 23 April 1942) is a French philosopher. He has taught at the University of Paris X, at the University of California, Irvine and is currently an Anniversary Chair Professor at the Centre for Research in Modern European Philosophy (CRMEP) at Kingston University and a visiting professor at the Department of French and Romance Philology at Columbia University.

== Life ==
Balibar was born in Avallon, Yonne, Burgundy, France in 1942. He entered the École Normale Supérieure in 1960.

In 1961, Balibar joined the French Communist Party (PCF). He was expelled in 1981 for critiquing the party's policy on immigration in an article.

Balibar participated in Louis Althusser's seminar on Karl Marx's Das Kapital in 1965. This seminar resulted in the book Reading Capital, co-authored by Althusser and his students. Balibar's chapter, "On the Basic Concepts of Historical Materialism," was republished along with those of Althusser in the book's abridged version (trans. 1970), until a complete translation was published in 2016.

In 1987, he received his doctorate degree in philosophy from the Katholieke Universiteit Nijmegen in the Netherlands. He received his habilitation from the Université Paris I in 1993. Balibar joined the University of Paris X-Nanterre as a professor in 1994, and the University of California—Irvine in 2000. He became professor emeritus of Paris X in 2002.

His daughter with the physicist Françoise Balibar is the actress Jeanne Balibar.

== Work ==
In Masses, Classes, Ideas (1994), Balibar argues that in Das Kapital (or Capital), the theory of historical materialism comes into conflict with the critical theory that Marx begins to develop, particularly in his analysis of the category of labor, which in capitalism becomes a form of property. This conflict involves two distinct uses of the term "labor": labor as the revolutionary class subject (i.e., the "proletariat") and labor as an objective condition for the reproduction of capitalism (the "working class"). In The German Ideology, Marx conflates these two meanings, and treats labor as, in Balibar's words, the "veritable site of truth as well as the place from which the world is changed..."

In Capital, however, the disparity between the two senses of labor becomes apparent. One manifestation of this is the virtual disappearance in the text of the term "proletariat." As Balibar points out, the term appears only twice in the first edition of Capital, published in 1867: in the dedication to Wilhelm Wolff and in the two final sections on the "General Law of Capitalist Accumulation". For Balibar, this implies that "the emergence of a revolutionary form of subjectivity (or identity)... is never a specific property of nature, and therefore brings with it no guarantees, but obliges us to search for the conditions in a conjuncture that can precipitate class struggles into mass movements..." Moreover, "[t]here is no proof… that these forms are always and eternally the same (for example, the party-form, or the trade union)."

In "The Nation Form: History and Ideology," Balibar critiques modern conceptions of the nation-state. He states that he is undertaking a study of the contradiction of the nation-state because "Thinking about racism led us back to nationalism, and nationalism to uncertainty about the historical realities and categorization of the nation".

Balibar contends that it is impossible to pinpoint the beginning of a nation or to argue that the modern people who inhabit a nation-state are the descendants of the nation that preceded it. Balibar argues that, because no nation-state has an ethnic base, every nation-state must create fictive ethnicities in order to project stability on the populace:

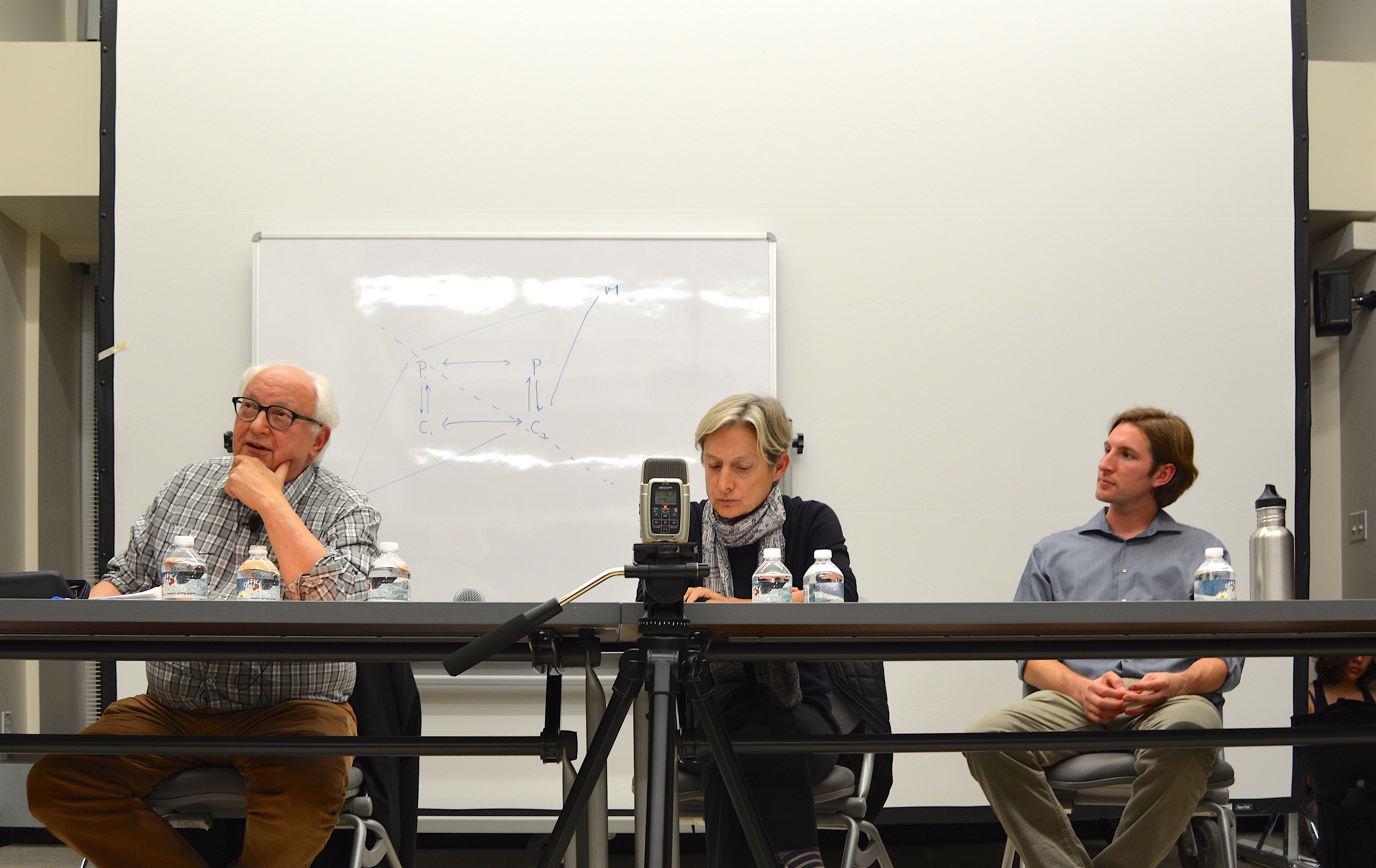
Etienne Balibar with Judith Butler in Berkeley, 2014

"the idea of nations without a state, or nations 'before' the state, is thus a contradiction in terms, because a state always is implied in the historic framework of a national formation (even if not necessarily within the limits of its territory). But this contradiction is masked by the fact that national states, whose integrity suffers from internal conflicts that threaten its survival (regional conflicts, and especially class conflicts), project beneath their political existence to a preexisting 'ethnic' or 'popular' unity".

In order to minimize these regional, class, and race conflicts, nation-states fabricate myths of origin that produce the illusion of shared ethnicity among all their inhabitants. In order to create these myths of origins, nation-states scour the historical period during which they were "formed" to find justification for their existence. They also create the illusion of shared ethnicity through linguistic communities: when everyone has access to the same language, they feel as if they share an ethnicity. Balibar argues that "schooling is the principal institution which produces ethnicity as linguistic community." In addition, this ethnicity is created through the "nationalization of the family," meaning that the state comes to perform certain functions that might traditionally be performed by the family, such as the regulation of marriages and administration of social security. In recent work following the "populist" wave, Balibar has called the incorporation of these different elements "absolute capitalism."

== Bibliography ==
=== Works in French ===
- 1965: Lire le Capital. With Louis Althusser et al.
- 1974: Cinq Etudes du Matérialisme Historique.
- 1976: Sur La Dictature du Prolétariat.
- 1985: Spinoza et la politique.
- 1988: Race, Nation, Classe. With Immanuel Wallerstein.
- 1991: Écrits pour Althusser.
- 1992: Les Frontieres De La Démocratie
- 1993: La philosophie de Marx.
- 1997: La crainte des masses: politique et philosophie avant et après Marx. (French version of Masses, Classes, Ideas, with extra essays)
- 1998: Droit de cité. Culture et politique en démocratie.
- 1998: John Locke, Identité et différence - L'invention de la conscience (Balibar's Monograph on John Locke)
- 2001: Nous, citoyens d'Europe? Les frontières, l'État, le peuple.
- 2003: L'Europe, l'Amérique, la Guerre. Réflexions sur la médiation européenne.
- 2005: Europe, Constitution, Frontière.
- 2010: La proposition de l'égaliberté.
- 2010: Violence et Civilité: Wellek Library Lectures et autres essais de philosophie politique
- 2011: Citoyen sujet et autres essais d'anthropologie philosophique
- 2012: Saeculum : Culture, religion, idéologie
- 2015: Violence, civilité, révolution (edited volume about Balibar's work)
- 2016: Europe, Crise et fin ?
- 2016: Des Universels. Essais et conférences
- 2018: Spinoza politique. Le transindividuel (French version of Italian original, which appeared in 2002)

=== Selected translations ===
- 1970: Reading Capital (London: NLB). With Louis Althusser. Trans. Ben Brewster.
- 1977: On the Dictatorship of the Proletariat (London: NLB). Trans. Grahame Lock.
- 1991: Race, Nation, Class: Ambiguous Identities (London & New York: Verso). With Immanuel Wallerstein. Trans. Chris Turner.
- 1994: Masses, Classes, Ideas: Studies on Politics and Philosophy Before and After Marx (New York & London: Routledge). Trans. James Swenson.
- 1995: The Philosophy of Marx (London & New York: Verso). Trans. Chris Turner.
- 1998: Spinoza and Politics (London & New York: Verso). Trans. Peter Snowdon.
- 2002: Politics and the Other Scene (London & New York: Verso). Trans. Christine Jones, James Swenson & Chris Turner.
- 2004: We, the People of Europe? Reflections on Transnational Citizenship (Princeton & Oxford: Princeton University Press). Trans. James Swenson.
- 2013: Identity and Difference: John Locke and the Invention of Consciousness (London & New York: Verso).
- 2014: Equaliberty: Political Essays (Durham, NC: Duke University Press). Trans. James Ingram.
- 2015: Violence and Civility: On the Limits of Political Philosophy (New York: Columbia University Press). Trans. G.M. Goshgarian.
- 2015: Citizenship (Cambridge: Polity). Trans. Thomas Scott-Railton.
- 2017: Citizen Subject: Foundations for Philosophical Anthropology (New York: Fordham University Press). Trans. Steven Miller.
- 2018: Secularism and Cosmopolitanism: Critical Hypotheses on Religion and Politics (New York: Columbia University Press). Trans. G. M. Goshgarian.
- 2020: Spinoza, the Transindividual (Edinburgh: Edinburgh University Press). Trans. M.G.E. Kelly.

=== Online texts ===
- Occasional Notes on Communism. In: Krisis: Journal for Contemporary Philosophy
- Till Death Palestine, Philosophy World Democracy, 25 October 2023.
- The Genocide in Gaza and its Consequences for the Israeli-Palestinian Conflict, Philosophy World Democracy, 19 September 2024.
- “The Rectification of the Communist Manifesto”, translated by Patrick King, décalages journal,
- Theses for an Alter-Globalising Europe .
- Reading Capital (1968).
- Self-Criticism: Answers to Questions from Theoretical Practice (1973).
- On the Dictatorship of the Proletariat (1977).
- At The Borders Of Europe (1999).
- October 1917 After One Century, Crisis and Critique, Volume 4, Issue 2.
- “Ontological difference, anthropological difference, and equal liberty”, European Journal of Philosophy, 28(1), pp. 3–14, https://doi.org/10.1111/ejop.12512 .
- “Althusser’s dramaturgy and the critique of ideology”, The Roger B. Henkle Memorial Lecture at Brown University, Providence, October 7, 2013.

=== Interviews ===
- “Étienne Balibar in Conversation: Revisiting European Marxism”, Theory, Culture & Society, 36(7–8) pp. 231–247.
- “Of Ambivalent Insurrections: Interview with Étienne Balibar”, Philosophy World Democracy, 15 January 2021.
- “Democracy, Oppression, and Universality: an Interview with Étienne Balibar”, Verso, 7 December 2017.
- “A Period of Intense Debate about Marxist Philosophy”: An Interview with Étienne Balibar, Viewpoint Magazine, March 17, 2015.
- “Étienne Balibar: Socialism and Democracy Are Intrinsically Related Ideas”, Jacobin, 2023.
