= Emmanuel Terray =

French anthropologist (1935–2024)

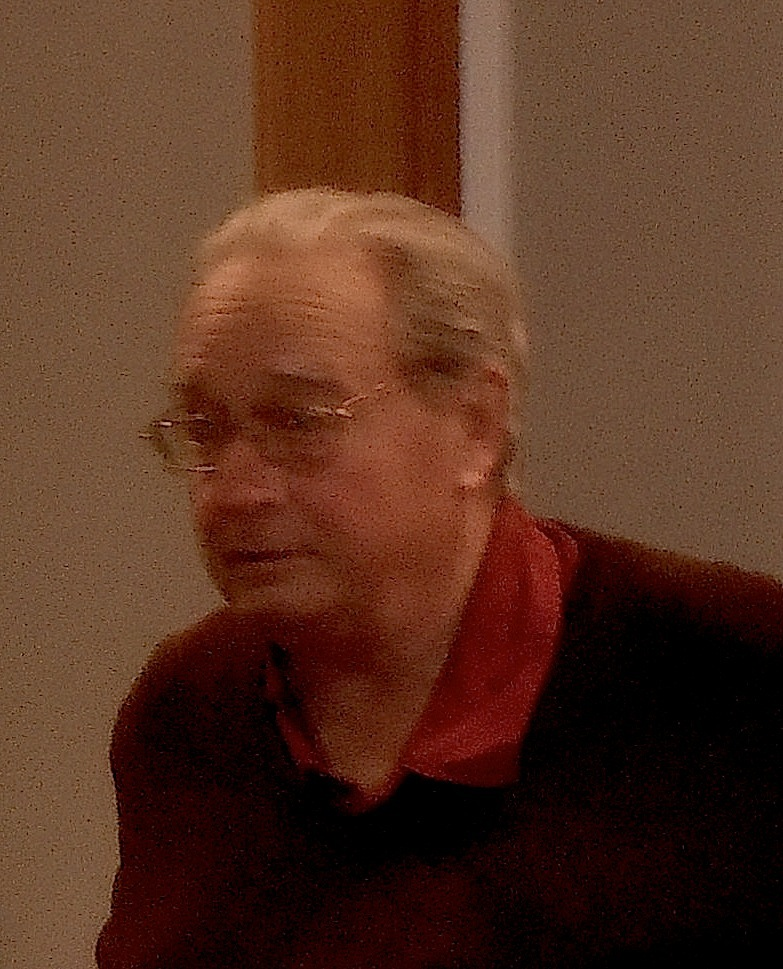
Image of E. Terray

Emmanuel Terray (1935 – 26 March 2024) was a French anthropologist and political activist. He died on 26 March 2024, at the age of 89.

== Publications ==
- L'Organisation sociale des Dida de Côte d'Ivoire. Essai sur un village dida de la région de Lakota, Abidjan, Annales de l'Université d'Abidjan, tome 1, 1969.
- Le Marxisme devant les sociétés « primitives ». Deux études, Paris, Éditions Maspero, 1969 (coll. « Théorie »).
- (ed. with Jean Bazin), Guerres de lignages et guerres d'États en Afrique, Paris, Éditions des Archives contemporaines, 1982.
- Lettres à la fugitive, Paris, Éditions Odile Jacob, 1988.
- La Politique dans la caverne, Paris, Le Seuil, 1990.
- Le Troisième jour du communisme, Arles, Actes Sud, 1992.
- Une histoire du royaume Abron du Gyaman, des origines à la conquête coloniale, Paris, Éditions Karthala, 1995.
- Une passion allemande. Luther, Kant, Schiller, Hölderlin, Kleist, Paris, Le Seuil, 1994.
- Ombres berlinoises. Voyage à travers une autre Allemagne, Paris, Odile Jacob, 1996.
- Clausewitz, Paris, Fayard, 1999.
- (ed. with Jean-Luc Jamard and Margarita Xanthakou), En substances. Textes pour Françoise Héritier, Paris, Fayard, 2000.
- Traversées. Livres, actions, voyages, Brussels, Labor, 2005 - Un livre d'entretiens avec un cadet, l'anthropologue Jean-Paul Colleyn.
- Face aux abus de mémoire, Arles, Actes Sud, 2006.
- Immigration : fantasmes et réalités, with Claire Rodier, Paris, Éd. La Découverte, 2008 (coll. « Sur le vif »).
- Combats avec Méduse, Paris, Éditions Galilée, 2011.
- Penser à droite, Paris, Éditions Galilée, 2012

=== Chapters ===
- Le Grand Atlas des Religions (Encyclopaedia Universalis 1990), chapter "Organisation, règles et Pouvoirs", article about "Black Africa", pp. 248–249
