= Epistemological rupture =

Concept of knowledge theory

Epistemological rupture (or epistemological break) is a notion introduced in 1938 by French philosopher Gaston Bachelard, and later used by Louis Althusser.

Bachelard proposed that the history of science is replete with "epistemological obstacles"—or unthought/unconscious structures that were immanent within the realm of the sciences, such as principles of division (e.g., mind/body). The history of science, Bachelard asserted, consisted in the formation and establishment of these epistemological obstacles, and then the subsequent tearing down of the obstacles. This latter stage is an epistemological rupture—where an unconscious obstacle to scientific thought is thoroughly ruptured or broken away from.

== Etymology ==
Epistemology, from the Greek words episteme (knowledge) and logos ("word, speech") is the branch of philosophy that deals with the nature, origin and scope of knowledge. Rupture, from Old French rupture or Latin ruptura, is defined as an instance of breaking or bursting suddenly and completely, as well as a breach of a harmonious link in a figurative way.

== See also ==
- Paradigm shift – Fundamental change in ideas and practices within a scientific discipline
- Discontinuity (Postmodernism) – Foucault's description of things no longer known in the same way
- Scientific Revolution – Emergence of modern science (1572-1687)
