= Israeli apartheid =

Israeli system of racial segregation and discrimination

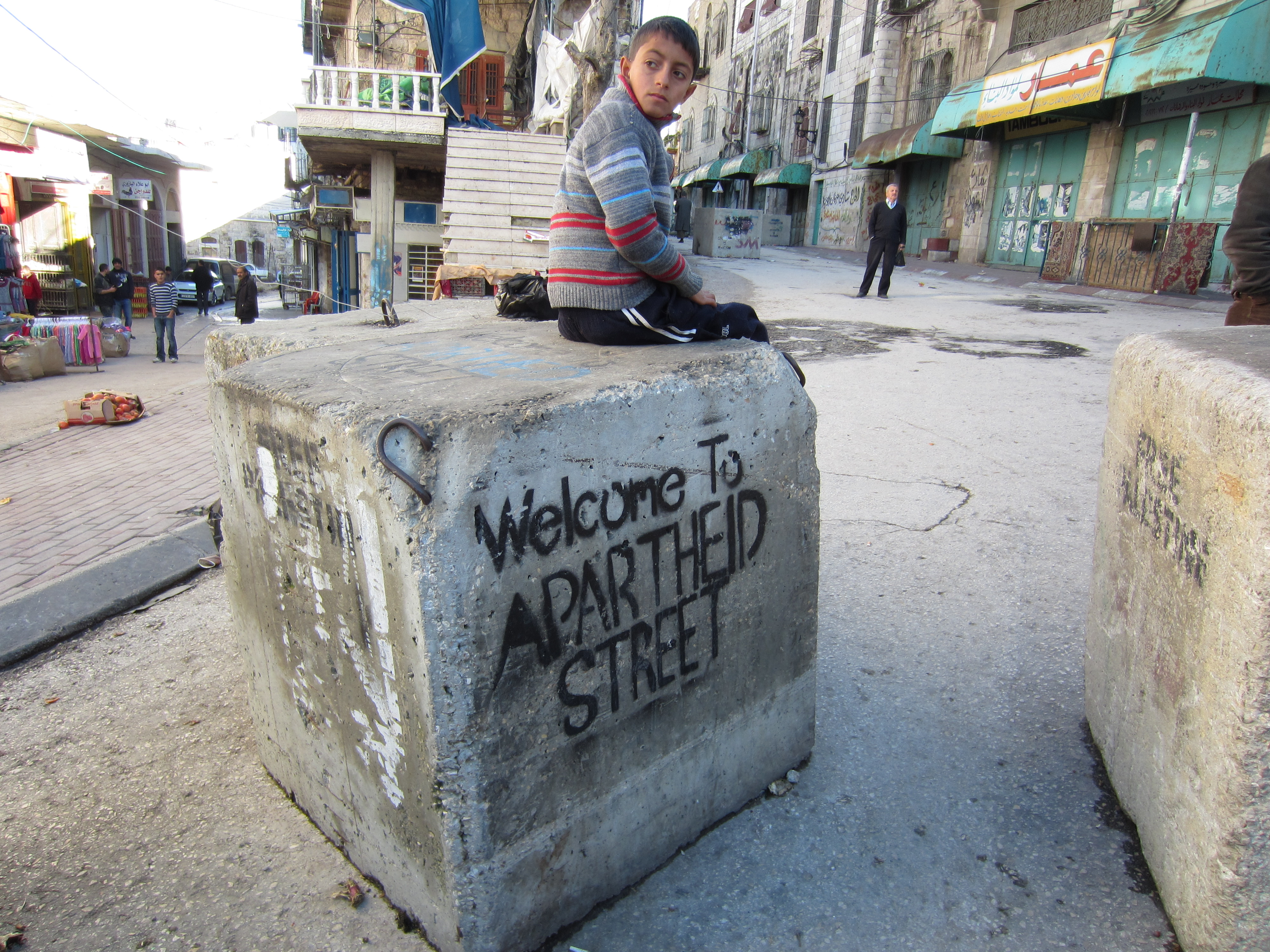
A Palestinian child sitting on a roadblock at Al-Shuhada Street within the Old City of Hebron in the Israeli-occupied West Bank (2013). Palestinians have given the street the moniker "Apartheid Street" because it is closed to Palestinian traffic and open only to Israeli settlers and tourists.

Israeli apartheid is a system of institutionalized segregation and discrimination in the Israeli-occupied Palestinian territories. The system is characterized by near-total physical separation between the Israeli settler and Palestinian populations of the West Bank, as well as the judicial separation that governs both communities, which discriminates against Palestinians in a wide range of ways. Israel also discriminates against Palestinians in the diaspora, including refugees, whose residency and property claims it denies, and against its own Palestinian citizens. (Note: Attributed to multiple references:) Whether apartheid exists in Israel proper is disputed. (Note: "Israel proper" refers to the borders of Israel as recognized by the majority of the international community, which excludes East Jerusalem, the West Bank, the Golan Heights, and the Gaza Strip.)

Since the 1948 Palestine war, Israel has denied Palestinian refugees who were expelled or fled from what became its territory, the right to return to their lost properties. Israel has occupied the West Bank and the Gaza Strip since the 1967 Six-Day War, which is now the longest military occupation in modern history, and, in contravention of international law, has been constructing large settlements there that separate Palestinian communities from one another and prevent the establishment of a Palestinian state. The settlements are mostly encircled by the Israeli West Bank barrier, which intentionally separates the Israeli and Palestinian populations, a policy called Hafrada. Jewish Israeli settlers are subject to Israeli civil law, but the Palestinian population is subject to military law. Settlers also have access to separate roads and exploit the region's natural resources at the expense of its Palestinian inhabitants.

Academic comparisons between Israel-Palestine and South African apartheid were prevalent by the mid-1990s. Since the definition of apartheid as a crime in the 2002 Rome Statute, attention has shifted to the question of international law. In December 2019, the Committee on the Elimination of Racial Discrimination announced it was reviewing the Palestinian complaint that Israel's policies in the West Bank amount to apartheid. Since then, several Israeli, Palestinian, and international human rights organizations have characterized the situation as apartheid, including Yesh Din, B'Tselem, Human Rights Watch, and Amnesty International. This view has been supported by United Nations investigators, the African National Congress (ANC), human rights groups, and many prominent Israeli political and cultural figures. The International Court of Justice in its 2024 advisory opinion found that Israel's occupation of the Palestinian territories constitutes systemic discrimination and is in breach of Article 3 of the International Convention on the Elimination of All Forms of Racial Discrimination, which prohibits racial segregation and apartheid. The opinion did not specify whether it was referring to racial segregation, apartheid, or both.

Elements of Israeli apartheid include the Law of Return, the 2003 Citizenship and Entry into Israel Law, the 2018 Nation-State Law, and many laws regarding security, freedom of movement, land and planning, citizenship, political representation in the Knesset (legislature), education, and culture. Israel says its policies are driven by security considerations, and that the accusation of apartheid is factually and morally inaccurate and intended to delegitimize Israel. It also often calls the charge antisemitic, which critics have in turn called weaponization of antisemitism.

== Historical comparisons ==
In 1961, South African prime minister Hendrik Verwoerd—architect of South Africa's apartheid policies—dismissed an Israeli vote against South African apartheid at the United Nations, saying, "Israel is not consistent in its new anti-apartheid attitude ... they took Israel away from the Arabs after the Arabs lived there for a thousand years. In that, I agree with them. Israel, like South Africa, is an apartheid state." His successor John Vorster held the same view. Since then, a number of sources have used the apartheid analogy. In the early 1970s, Arabic language magazines of the Palestine Liberation Organization (PLO) and Popular Front for the Liberation of Palestine (PFLP) compared the Israeli proposals for Palestinian autonomy to the Bantustan strategy of South Africa. In 1970, an anti-apartheid activist in the UK's Liberal Party, Louis Eaks, referred to the situation in Israel as "apartheid" and was threatened with expulsion as a result.

In 1979, the Palestinian sociologist Elia Zureik said that while not de jure an apartheid state, Israeli society was characterized by a latent form of apartheid. The concept emerged with some frequency in both academic and activist writings in the 1980s–90s, when Uri Davis, Meron Benvenisti, Richard Locke, and A. T. Q. Stewart used the term apartheid to describe Israel's treatment of the Palestinians.

In the 1990s, the term "Israeli apartheid" gained prominence after Israel, as a result of the Oslo Accords, granted the Palestinians limited self-government in the form of the Palestinian Authority and established a system of permits and checkpoints in the Palestinian Territories. The apartheid analogy gained additional traction after Israel constructed the West Bank Barrier.

In 2001, an NGO Forum ran separately from the World Conference against Racism in the nearby Kingsmead Stadium in Durban, from 28 August to 1 September. It consisted of 3,000 NGOs and was attended by 8,000 representatives. The declaration the NGO Forum adopted was not an official document of the conference. The final NGO document called "for the reinstitution of the UN resolution equating Zionism with racism" and "the complete and total isolation of Israel as an apartheid state".

Former US President Jimmy Carter wrote the 2006 book Palestine: Peace Not Apartheid. His use of the term "apartheid" was calibrated to avoid specific accusations of racism against the government of Israel, and carefully limited to the situation in Gaza and the West Bank. In a letter to the Board of Rabbis of Greater Phoenix, Carter made clear that he was not discussing the circumstances within Israel but exclusively within Gaza and the West Bank. In a 2007 interview, he said: "Apartheid is a word that is an accurate description of what has been going on in the West Bank, and it's based on the desire or avarice of a minority of Israelis for Palestinian land. It's not based on racism...This is a word that's a very accurate description of the forced separation within the West Bank of Israelis from Palestinians and the total domination and oppression of Palestinians by the dominant Israeli military."

By 2013, the analogy between the West Bank and Bantustans of apartheid-era South Africa was widely drawn in international circles. In the US, where the notion had previously been taboo, Israel's rule over the occupied territories was increasingly compared to apartheid.

== West Bank and Gaza Strip ==
=== Hafrada–apartheid comparison ===
Hafrada (Hebrew: הפרדה literally 'separation') is the Israeli government's official term for the policy of separating the Palestinian population in Palestinian territories from the Israeli population. The term refers to the general policy of separation the Israeli government has adopted and implemented over the Palestinians in the West Bank and Gaza Strip. Scholars and commentators have compared the word to apartheid, with some claiming the two words are equivalent.

The Israeli West Bank barrier (Hebrew: גדר ההפרדה Geder Ha'hafrada, "separation fence"), the associated controls on Palestinians' movements posed by West Bank Closures, and Israel's unilateral disengagement from Gaza have been cited as examples of hafrada. Aaron Klieman has distinguished between partition plans based on hafrada, which he translates as "detachment", and hipardut, translated as "disengagement".

Since its first public introductions, the concept-turned-policy or paradigm of hafrada has dominated Israeli political and cultural discourse. In 2009, Israeli historian Benny Morris said those who equate Israeli efforts to separate the two populations with apartheid are effectively trying to undermine the legitimacy of any peace agreement based on a two-state solution. In 2023, former Human Rights Watch director Kenneth Roth said his organization had long refrained from interpreting the reality on the ground in terms of apartheid as long as there was a chance the peace process would succeed. Since, in his view, the process is going nowhere and the Israeli government is undermining a two-state solution, Roth has concluded Israel's policies in the West Bank have "all the elements of the oppressive discrimination that constitute apartheid". Former Foreign Policy editor David Rothkopf has called Israel an apartheid state.

=== Under Israeli military occupation ===
Leila Farsakh, associate professor of political science at University of Massachusetts Boston, has said that after 1977, "the military government in the West Bank and Gaza Strip (WBGS) expropriated and enclosed Palestinian land and allowed the transfer of Israeli settlers to the occupied territories." She notes that settlers continued to be governed by Israeli laws, and that a different system of military law was enacted "to regulate the civilian, economic and legal affairs of Palestinian inhabitants". She says, "[m]any view these Israeli policies of territorial integration and societal separation as apartheid, even if they were never given such a name."

=== Under Palestinian Authority ===
Most Arabs living in the West Bank, an area occupied by Israel in the 1967 Six-Day War and deemed to be occupied territory under international law, are under the civil control of the Palestinian National Authority and are not Israeli citizens. In some areas of the West Bank, they are under Israeli security control.

In 2007, in advance of a report from the United Nations Human Rights Council, Special Rapporteur John Dugard said that "Israel's laws and practices in the OPT [occupied Palestinian territories] certainly resemble aspects of apartheid." Dugard asked: "Can it seriously be denied that the purpose [...] is to establish and maintain domination by one racial group (Jews) over another racial group (Palestinians) and systematically oppressing them?" In October 2010, Richard A. Falk reported to the General Assembly Third Committee that "the nature of the occupation as of 2010 substantiates earlier allegations of colonialism and apartheid in evidence and law to a greater extent than was the case even three years ago." Falk called it a "cumulative process" and said "the longer it continues...the more serious is the abridgment of fundamental Palestinian rights."

Israeli Defense Minister and former prime minister Ehud Barak said in 2010: "As long as in this territory west of the Jordan River there is only one political entity called Israel it is going to be either non-Jewish, or non-democratic. If this bloc of millions of Palestinians cannot vote, that will be an apartheid state."

In November 2014, former Attorney General of Israel Michael Ben-Yair urged the European Economic Union to endorse the creation of a Palestinian state, arguing that Israel had imposed an apartheid regime on the West Bank. In 2015, Meir Dagan, a former head of the Mossad, argued that continuing Prime Minister Netanyahu's policies would result in an Israel that is either a binational state or an apartheid state.

=== West Bank barrier ===
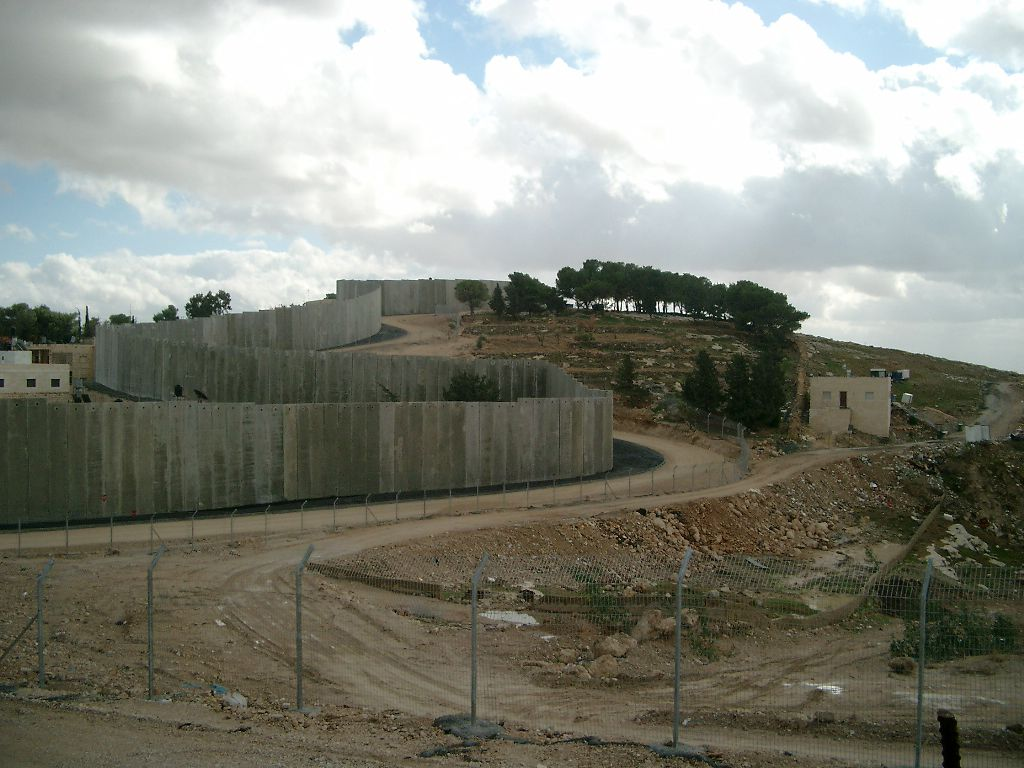
The barrier, called an "apartheid wall" by pro-Palestinian groups, "a security fence" by Israel

In 2003, a year after Operation Defensive Shield, the Israeli government announced a project of "fences and other physical obstacles" to keep Palestinians from crossing into Israel. Several figures, including Mohammad Sarwar, John Pilger, and Mustafa Barghouti, have called the resultant West Bank barrier an "apartheid wall".

Supporters of the barrier consider it largely responsible for reducing incidents of terrorism by 90% from 2002 to 2005. Some Israelis have compared the separation plan to the South African apartheid regime. Political scientist Meron Benvenisti wrote that Israel's disengagement from Gaza created a bantustan model for Gaza. According to Benvenisti, Ariel Sharon's intention to disengage from Gaza only after construction of the fence was completed, "along a route that will include all settlement blocs (in keeping with Binyamin Netanyahu's demand), underscores the continuity of the bantustan concept. The fence creates three bantustans on the West Bank: Jenin-Nablus, Bethlehem-Hebron, and Ramallah. He called this "the real link between the Gaza and West Bank plans".

In 2004, the International Court of Justice ruled in an advisory opinion that the wall is illegal where it extends beyond the 1967 Green Line into the West Bank. Israel disagreed with the opinion, but its supreme court subsequently ordered the barrier to be moved in sections where its route was seen to cause more hardship to Palestinians than security concerns justified. The Israeli Court ruled that the barrier is defensive and accepted the government's position that the route is based on security considerations.

=== Land ===
Henry Siegman, a former national director of the American Jewish Congress, has said that the network of settlements in the West Bank has created an "irreversible colonial project" aimed to foreclose the possibility of a viable Palestinian state. According to Siegman, in accomplishing this Israel has "crossed the threshold from 'the only democracy in the Middle East' to the only apartheid regime in the Western world". He argues that denying Palestinians both self-determination and Israeli citizenship amounts to a "double disenfranchisement", which when based on ethnicity amounts to racism, and that reserving democracy for privileged citizens and keeping others "behind checkpoints and barbed wire fences" is the opposite of democracy.

John Dugard has compared Israel's confiscation of Palestinian farms and land, and destruction of Palestinian homes, to similar policies of apartheid-era South Africa.

A major 2002 study of Israeli settlement practices by the Israeli human rights organization B'Tselem concluded: "Israel has created in the Occupied Territories a regime of separation based on discrimination, applying two separate systems of law in the same area and basing the rights of individuals on their nationality. This regime is the only one of its kind in the world, and is reminiscent of distasteful regimes from the past, such as the apartheid regime in South Africa.

=== Criminal law ===
In Illar, Tulkarm, occupation soldiers storm a taxi office to tear down the Palestinian flag.

In 2007, the UN Committee on the Elimination of Racial Discrimination reported that Palestinians and Israeli settlers in the occupied territories are subject to different criminal laws, leading to longer detention and harsher punishments for Palestinians than Israelis for the same offenses. Amnesty International has reported that in the West Bank, Israeli settlers and soldiers who engage in abuses against Palestinians, including unlawful killings, enjoy "impunity" from punishment and are rarely prosecuted, but Palestinians detained by Israeli security forces may be imprisoned for prolonged periods of time, and reports of their torture and other ill-treatment are not credibly investigated.

Dugard has compared Israeli imprisonment of Palestinians to policies of apartheid-era South Africa, saying, "Apartheid's security police practiced torture on a large scale. So do the Israeli security forces. There were many political prisoners on Robben Island but there are more Palestinian political prisoners in Israeli jails."

=== Access to water ===
The World Bank found in 2009 that Israeli settlements in the West Bank (which amount to 15% of its population) are given access to over 80% of its freshwater resources, despite the fact that the Oslo accords call for "joint" management of such resources. This has created, according to the Bank, "real water shortages" for the Palestinians. In January 2012, the Foreign Affairs Committee of the French parliament published a report calling Israel's water policies in the West Bank "a weapon serving the new apartheid". The report noted that the 450,000 Israeli settlers used more water than the 2.3 million Palestinians, "in contravention of international law", that Palestinians are not allowed to use the underground aquifers, and that Israel was deliberately destroying wells, reservoirs and water purification plants. Israeli Foreign Ministry spokesman Yigal Palmor said the report was "loaded with the language of vicious propaganda, far removed from any professional criticism with which one could argue intelligently". A Begin–Sadat Center for Strategic Studies report concludes that Israel has fulfilled the water agreements it has made with the Palestinians, and the author said the situation is "just the opposite of apartheid" as Israel has provided water infrastructure to more than 700 Palestinian villages.

In 2008, the Association for Civil Rights in Israel concluded that a segregated road network in the West Bank, expansion of Jewish settlements, restriction of the growth of Palestinian towns, and discriminatory granting of services, budgets, and access to natural resources are "a blatant violation of the principle of equality and in many ways reminiscent of the Apartheid regime in South Africa". The group reversed its previous reluctance to make a comparison to South Africa because "things are getting worse rather than better", according to spokeswoman Melanie Takefman.

=== Travel and movement ===
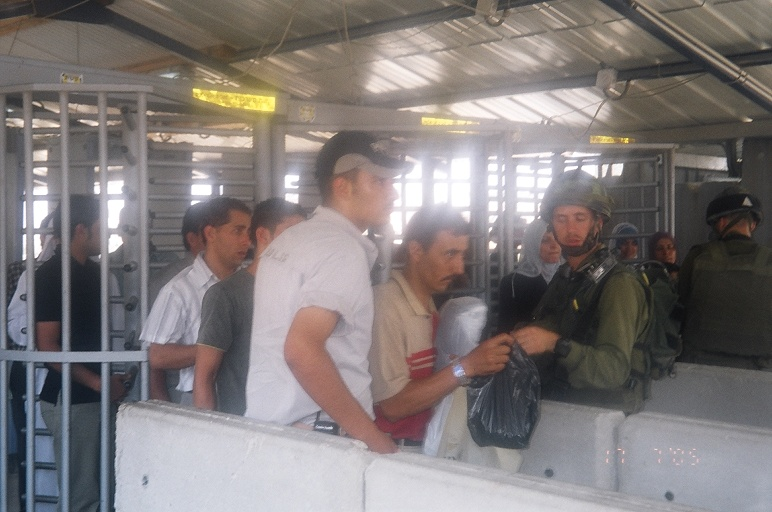
Huwwara Checkpoint, one of many Israeli checkpoints and closures (dismantled 2011) that restricted the movement of Palestinians in the occupied West Bank and have been compared to the apartheid pass laws

Palestinians living in non-annexed portions of the West Bank do not have Israeli citizenship or voting rights in Israel but are subject to movement restrictions by the Israeli government. Israel has created roads and checkpoints in the West Bank with the stated purpose of preventing the uninhibited movement of suicide bombers and militants in the region. The human rights NGO B'Tselem has indicated that such policies have isolated some Palestinian communities and that Israel's road regime "based on the principle of separation through discrimination, bears striking similarities to the racist apartheid regime that existed in South Africa until 1994".

The International Court of Justice stated that the International Covenant on Civil and Political Rights guarantees the fundamental rights of the Palestinian population of the occupied territories, and that Israel cannot deny them on the grounds of security. Marwan Bishara, a teacher of international relations at the American University of Paris, has said that the restrictions on the movement of goods between Israel and the West Bank are "a de facto apartheid system". Israeli ambassador to the United States Michael Oren claimed that none of this even remotely resembles apartheid, since "the vast majority of settlers and Palestinians choose to live apart because of cultural and historical differences, not segregation, though thousands of them do work side by side. The separate roads were created in response to terrorist attacks—not to segregate Palestinians but to save Jewish lives. And Israeli roads are used by Israeli Jews and Arabs alike."

A permit and closure system was introduced in 1990. Leila Farsakh maintains that this system imposes "on Palestinians similar conditions to those faced by blacks under the pass laws. Like the pass laws, the permit system controlled population movement according to the settlers' unilaterally defined considerations." In response to the Al-Aqsa Intifada, Israel modified the permit system and fragmented the WBGS [West Bank and Gaza Strip] territorially. "In April 2002 Israel declared that the WBGS would be cut into eight main areas, outside which Palestinians could not live without a permit."

John Dugard has said these laws "resemble, but in severity go far beyond, apartheid's pass system". Jamal Zahalka, an Israeli-Arab member of the Knesset, has also said that this permit system is a feature of apartheid. Azmi Bishara, a former Knesset member, argued that the Palestinian situation had been caused by "colonialist apartheid".

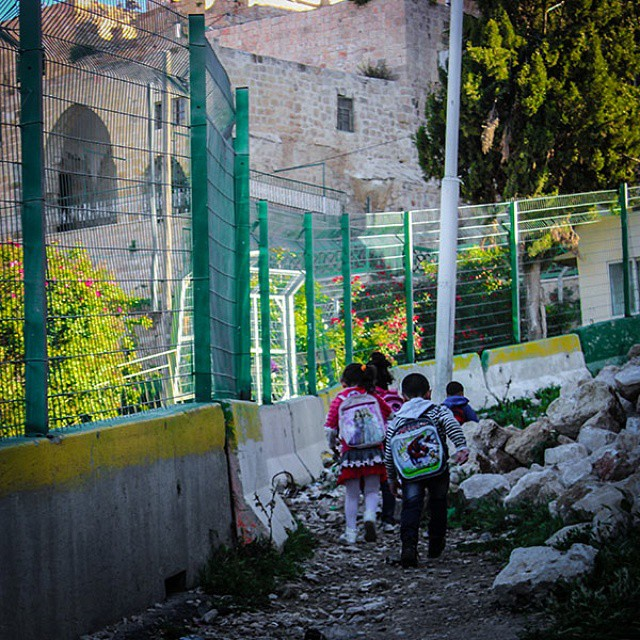
Palestinian children walk to their kindergarten, separated from the paved path reserved for Israeli settlers.

B'Tselem wrote in 2004, "Palestinians are barred from or have restricted access to 450 miles [720 km] of West Bank roads", and has said this system has "clear similarities" to South Africa's apartheid regime.

In October 2005, the Israel Defense Forces stopped Palestinians from driving on Highway 60 as part of a plan for a separate road network for Palestinians and Israelis in the West Bank. The road had been sealed after the fatal shooting of three settlers near Bethlehem. As of 2005, no private Palestinian cars were permitted on the road although public transport was still allowed.

In 2011, Major General Nitzan Alon abolished separate public transportation systems on the West Bank, permitting Palestinians to ride alongside Israelis. Settlers have protested the measure. The IDF order was reportedly overturned by Moshe Ya'alon who, responding to pressure from settler groups, issued a directive that would deny Palestinians passage on buses running from Israel to the West Bank. In 2014, the decision was said to be made on security grounds, though according to Haaretz, military officials say that Palestinian use of such transport poses no security threat. Justice Minister Tzipi Livni asked Israeli Attorney General Yehuda Weinstein to examine the ban's legality and Weinstein immediately demanded that Ya'alon provide an explanation for his decision. Israeli security sources were quoted saying the decision had nothing to do with public buses and that the goal was to supervise entrance into and exit out of Israeli territory, thereby decreasing the chance of terrorist attacks inside Israel. Critics on the left called the policy tantamount to apartheid, and something that would render Israel a pariah state.

On 29 December 2009, Israel's High Court of Justice accepted the Association for Civil Rights in Israel's petition against an IDF order barring Palestinians from driving on Highway 443. The ruling was to come into effect five months after being issued, allowing Palestinians to use the road. According to plans the IDF laid out to implement the court's ruling, Palestinian use of the road was to remain limited. In March 2013, the Israeli Afikim bus company announced that, as of 4 March 2013, it would operate separate bus lines for Jews and Arabs in the occupied territories.

== Israel proper ==
Heribert Adam and Kogila Moodley define second-class citizen status through state power monopolies and minority suspicion, arguing that Israeli Palestinians experience this due to disparities in land access, civil service allocations, and educational funding.

In 2008, fifty-three Stanford University faculty members signed a letter saying that "the State of Israel has nothing in common with apartheid" within its national territory. They argued that Israel is a liberal democracy in which Arab citizens enjoy civil, religious, social, and political equality, and that likening Israel to apartheid South Africa was a "smear" and part of a campaign of "malicious propaganda".

South African Judge Richard Goldstone, writing in The New York Times in October 2011, said that while there exists a degree of separation between Israeli Jews and Arabs, "in Israel, there is no apartheid. Nothing there comes close to the definition of apartheid under the 1998 Rome Statute". He wrote that the situation in the West Bank "is more complex. But here too there is no intent to maintain 'an institutionalized regime of systematic oppression and domination by one racial group'. This is a critical distinction, even if Israel acts oppressively toward Palestinians there." Goldstone also wrote, "the charge that Israel is an apartheid state is a false and malicious one that precludes, rather than promotes, peace and harmony."

In 2023, Amnesty International condemned an Israeli court decision to forcibly evict 500 Palestinian Bedouins from Ras Jrabah in the Negev, saying the judgment showed the "deep discrimination that Palestinian citizens of Israel face under apartheid".

=== Land ===
There has been a steady extension of Israeli Arab rights to lease or purchase land formerly restricted to Jewish applicants, such as that owned by the Jewish National Fund (JNF) or the Jewish Agency. These groups, established by Jews during the Ottoman period to aid in building up a viable Jewish community in Ottoman Palestine, purchased land that could be rented only by Jews, thus encouraging Jewish immigration. After the establishment of the state of Israel, the Israel Lands Authority (ILA) oversaw the administration of these properties. On 8 March 2000, the Israeli Supreme Court ruled that Israeli Arabs had an equal right to purchase long-term leases of such land, even inside previously solely Jewish communities and villages.

In 2006, Chris McGreal of The Guardian said that as a result of the government's control over most of the land in Israel, the vast majority of land in Israel is not available to non-Jews.

In 2005, in response to a petition filed by Adalah (the Legal Center for Arab Minority Rights in Israel), Attorney General Menachem Mazuz ruled that the JNF's policy of refusing to sell land to non-Jews was in violation of anti-discrimination laws, on the basis that the JNF is administered by the ILA, which is a state-run agency. However, Mazuz also decided that any time JNF land is purchased by a non-Jew, the ILA would compensate the JNF with an equal amount of land, so that the total amount of Jewish-owned land remained the same. Shortly after this ruling, it was reported that the JNF and the Finance Ministry were attempting to draft a new agreement to separate the JNF from the state, thereby allowing it to continue its practice of selling land to Jews only.

In 2007, in response to a similar petition by Adalah, the High Court of Justice agreed to delay a ruling by at least four months, and a temporary settlement was reached (following the compromise proposed in 2005 by Mazuz) wherein, although the JNF would be prevented from discriminating on grounds of ethnicity, nevertheless every time land is sold to a non-Jew, the ILA would compensate it with an equivalent amount of land.

=== Community settlements legislation ===
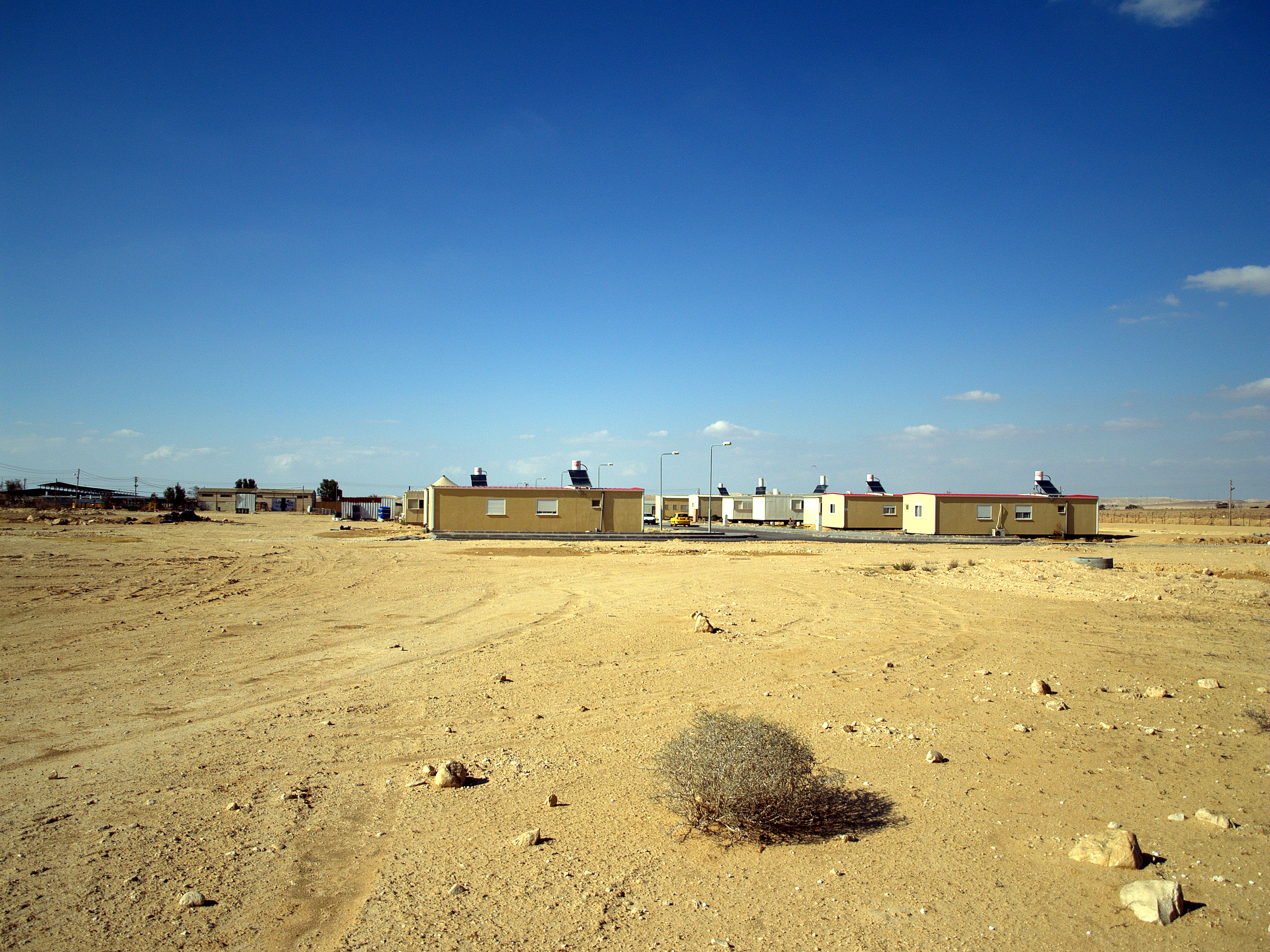
A community in the Negev established by the JNF under its Blueprint Negev program

In the early 2000s, several community settlements in the Negev and the Galilee were accused of barring Arab applicants from moving in. In 2010, the Knesset passed legislation that allowed admissions committees to function in smaller communities in the Galilee and the Negev, while explicitly forbidding committees to bar applicants on the basis of race, religion, sex, ethnicity, disability, personal status, age, parenthood, sexual orientation, country of origin, political views, or political affiliation. Critics say the law gives the privately run admissions committees wide latitude over public lands, and believe it will worsen discrimination against the Arab minority.

=== Israeli citizenship law ===
The Knesset passed the Citizenship and Entry into Israel Law in 2003 as an emergency measure after Israel had suffered its worst ever spate of suicide bombings and after several Palestinians who had been granted permanent residency on the grounds of family reunification took part in terrorist attacks in Israel. The law makes inhabitants of Iran, Afghanistan, Lebanon, Libya, Sudan, Syria, Iraq, Pakistan, Yemen, and areas governed by the Palestinian Authority ineligible for the automatic granting of Israeli citizenship and residency permits that is usually available through marriage to an Israeli citizen. This applies equally to a spouse of any Israeli citizen, whether Arab or Jewish, but in practice the law mostly affects Palestinian Israelis living in the towns bordering the West Bank. The law was intended to be temporary but has since been extended annually.

In May 2006, the Supreme Court of Israel upheld the law by a six to five vote. Chief Justice Aharon Barak sided with the minority, declaring: "This violation of rights is directed against Arab citizens of Israel. As a result, therefore, the law is a violation of the right of Arab citizens in Israel to equality." Zehava Gal-On, one of the founders of B'Tselem and a Knesset member with the Meretz-Yachad party, said that with the ruling "The Supreme Court could have taken a braver decision and not relegated us to the level of an apartheid state." The law was also criticized by Amnesty International and Human Rights Watch. In 2007, the restriction was expanded to citizens of Iran, Iraq, Syria and Lebanon.

Adam and Moodley cite the marriage law as an example of how Arab Israelis "resemble in many ways 'Colored' and Indian South Africans". They write: "Both Israeli Palestinians and Colored and Indian South Africans are restricted to second-class citizen status when another ethnic group monopolizes state power, treats the minorities as intrinsically suspect, and legally prohibits their access to land or allocates civil service positions or per capita expenditure on education differentially between dominant and minority citizens."

In June 2008, after the law was extended for another year, Amos Schocken, the publisher of the Israeli daily Haaretz, wrote in an opinion article that the law severely discriminates when comparing the rights of young Israeli Jewish citizens and young Israeli Arab citizens who marry, and that its existence in the law books turns Israel into an apartheid state.

Political sociologist Ran Greenstein argues that the Israeli system may be called "apartheid of a special type" to reflect both its similarities to and differences from apartheid in South Africa. He argues that Israeli citizenship policy distinguishes between Jews and Palestinians outside the country: Israel potentially extends citizenship to all Jews outside its territory, while Palestinian refugees outside its territory cannot become citizens, irrespective of either group's personal history or links to the territory. Israeli geographer Oren Yiftachel places Palestinian refugees outside Israeli-controlled territory at the bottom of a hierarchy of Palestinian legal statuses, saying that Israel denies their claims to residency and property rights.

=== Education ===
Israel's Compulsory Education Law and the State Education Law, passed by the Knesset in 1949 and 1953 respectively, allowed for Arabs, ultra-Orthodox, Religious Zionist, and secular Jews to maintain separate schools systems. The Israeli Pupils' Rights Law of 2000 prohibits educators from establishing different rights, obligations and disciplinary standards for students of different religions. Educational institutions may not discriminate against religious minorities in admissions or expulsion decisions or when developing curricula or assigning students to classes. Despite this, the Israeli school system remains heavily segregated along racial and religious lines.

In Israel, unlike in apartheid South Africa, education is free and compulsory for all children between ages 3-17, regardless of their nationality. However, for grades K-12, although not mandated by law, Israel generally maintains segregated schools for Arab and Jewish students on the grounds of "language differences", which many Israeli Arab parents characterize this as "a cover for systematic discrimination against their children". Although there are a few bilingual, mixed Jewish-Arab schools, over 70% of Arab and Jewish students attend Arab-only or Jewish-only schools, respectively. Arab students are unable to attend university in their own language; all of Israel's eight universities use Hebrew. In 1992 a government report concluded that nearly twice as much money was allocated to each Jewish child as to each Arab pupil. Likewise, a 2004 Human Rights Watch report identified significant disparities in education spending and found that discrimination against Arab children affects every aspect of the education system. Exam pass-rate for Arab pupils were about one-third lower than their Jewish compatriots'.

=== Population Registry Law ===
Chris McGreal, The Guardian's former chief Israel correspondent, compared Israel's Population Registry Law of 1965, which requires all residents of Israel to register their nationality, to South Africa's apartheid-era Population Registration Act, which categorized South Africans according racially to determine who could live on what land. According to McGreal, the Israeli identification cards determine where people are permitted to live, affect access to some government welfare programs, and affect how people are likely to be treated by civil servants and policemen.

=== "Jewish State" bill ===
The "Jewish State" bill, which passed in July 2018, states that "the right of national self-determination in the state of Israel is unique to the Jewish people". The bill allows the establishment of segregated towns in which residency is restricted by religion or nationality—which has been compared to the 1950 Group Areas Act, which established apartheid in South Africa. Opposition members and other commentators have warned that the bill would establish or consolidate an apartheid regime; a Haaretz editorial called it "a cornerstone of apartheid".

The Ministerial Committee for Legislation unanimously approved the bill in May 2017.

Critical scholars have since noted that the bill cemented Israel's ethnocratic structure as de jure, crippling the bargaining power of non-Jewish minority groups.

== Legal standard ==
The United Nations General Assembly adopted the International Convention on the Suppression and Punishment of the Crime of Apartheid (ICSPCA) in 1973. The ICSPCA defines apartheid as "inhuman acts committed for the purpose of establishing and maintaining domination by one racial group ... over another racial group ... and systematically oppressing them".

The crime of apartheid was further defined in 2002 by Article 7 of the Rome Statute of the International Criminal Court as encompassing inhumane acts such as torture, murder, forcible transfer, imprisonment, or persecution of an identifiable group on political, racial, national, ethnic, cultural, religious, or other grounds, "committed in the context of an institutionalized regime of systematic oppression and domination by one racial group over any racial group or groups and committed with the intention of maintaining that regime".

At Israel's five-yearly Universal Periodic Review in January 2018, Human Rights Watch and other rights groups criticized Israel. Human Rights Watch's Geneva Director John Fisher said, "Israel's professed commitment to human rights during its UN review is belied by its unwillingness to address human rights violations in the context of the occupation, the rights of Palestinians, or illegal settlement activity." Ahead of the review, eight Palestinian human rights organizations submitted a joint 60-page report detailing "Israel's creation of an institutionalised regime of systematic racial domination and oppression over the Palestinian people as a whole, which amounts to the crime of apartheid, in violation of Article 3 of the International Convention on the Elimination of All Forms of Racial Discrimination(ICERD)".

=== CERD ===
On 23 April 2018, Palestine filed an inter-state complaint against Israel for breaches of its obligations under the ICERD. On 12 December 2019, the Committee on the Elimination of Racial Discrimination decided that it has jurisdiction over the complaint and would begin a review of the Palestinian complaint that Israel's policies in the West Bank amount to apartheid. The committee also expressed concern that Israel had not adopted a legal definition of racial discrimination and issued a number of recommendations. On 30 April 2021, the Committee rejected the exceptions raised about the admissibility of inter-state communication and requested the creation of an ad hoc Conciliation Commission with a view "to an amicable solution of the matter on the basis of States parties' compliance with the convention." The ad hoc Conciliation Commission will issue a report, to be distributed among all state parties to ICERD. On 17 February 2022, CERD set up the commission, composed of five human rights experts from the Committee: Verene Shepherd, Gün Kut (chair), Pansy Tlakula, Chinsung Chung and Michał Balcerzak. On 4–5 May 2022, the Commission held its first in-person meeting and published its Rules of Procedure.

During the public hearings pertaining to the UNGA request for an ICJ advisory opinion on Israeli practices in the OPT, 24 states and three international organizations claimed that "Israel's policies and practices amount to a system of institutionalized racial discrimination and domination breaching the prohibition of apartheid under international law and/or amount to prohibited acts of racial discrimination." In its advisory opinion of 19 July 2024, the ICJ found that "the régime of comprehensive restrictions imposed by Israel on Palestinians in the Occupied Palestinian Territory "constitutes systemic discrimination based on, inter alia, race, religion or ethnic origin, in violation of Articles 2, paragraph 1, and 26 of the ICCPR, Article 2, paragraph 2, of the ICESCR, and Article 2 of CERD", "that Israel's legislation and measures impose and serve to maintain a near-complete separation in the West Bank and East Jerusalem between the settler and Palestinian communities", and "that Israel's legislation and measures constitute a breach of Article 3 of [I]CERD". The opinion did not say whether the discrimination amounts to apartheid. In separate opinions, Judge Nolte said that the Court did not have sufficient information to make that determination, while Judges Salam and Tladi thought the evidence supported such a finding. The opinion suggests that the definitions of apartheid in the apartheid convention and the Rome statute could be used to "inform the interpretation of Article 3".

On 22 August 2024, CERD published the final report of the ad hoc conciliation commission, drafted before the advisory opinion, that determined Israeli practices to be racial segregation. The accompanying annex reads, "The commission is of the view that those acts (Note: p4, 11. The commission notes the worrying assessment made by several United Nations bodies regarding segregation between Palestinians and Israelis as part of policies and practices imposed by Israel through two separate legal systems, road separation and movement restrictions, among other means.) may amount to a situation of apartheid if no action is taken by Israel to effectively address the issues raised". The question returns to CERD.

== Opinions on applicability ==
=== UN related reports ===
==== UN special rapporteur reports ====
In a 2007 report, UN Special Rapporteur on Palestine John Dugard said, "elements of the Israeli occupation constitute forms of colonialism and of apartheid, which are contrary to international law" and suggested that the International Court of Justice should consider the "legal consequences" of these.

In 2014, United Nations Special Rapporteur Richard A. Falk used the term in his "Report of the Special Rapporteur on the situation of human rights in the Palestinian territories occupied since 1967".

On 21 March 2022, Michael Lynk, the UN's Special Rapporteur for Human Rights in the Occupied Palestinian Territories, submitted a report to the UN Human Rights Council stating that Israel's control over the West Bank and Gaza Strip amounts to apartheid, an "institutionalised regime of systematic racial oppression and discrimination." The Israeli Foreign Ministry and other Israeli and Jewish organizations called Lynk hostile to Israel and the report baseless. In January, Foreign Minister Yair Lapid warned that 2022 would see intense efforts to call Israeli policy apartheid.

On 18 October 2022, the United Nations Special Rapporteur on the occupied Palestinian territories recommended in a report that UN member states develop "a plan to end the Israeli settler-colonial occupation and apartheid regime" and said these "violations" show that Israel's occupation is an "intentionally acquisitive, segregationist and repressive regime designed to prevent the realization of the Palestinian people's right to self-determination".

==== 2017 ESCWA Report ====
A 2017 report was "commissioned and approved by the UN but has not obtained an official endorsement from the Secretary General of the UN. Hence, it does not represent the views of the UN." Author Seada Hussein Adem discusses "the issue of apartheid on its own merits, in light of the Rome Statute and the Apartheid Convention" while acknowledging the analogy and taking "precaution to avoid using the discrete cases in apartheid South Africa as a yardstick to qualify conducts as amounting to the crime of apartheid", referring the reader to pages 14 to 17 of the 2017 report. At the time of publication, Rima Khalaf, then UN Under-Secretary General and ESCWA Executive Secretary, said the report "clearly and frankly concludes that Israel is a racist state that has established an apartheid system that persecutes the Palestinian people". The ESCWA comprises 18 Arab countries.

==== 2022 special committee on Israeli practices ====
The report of the Special Committee to Investigate Israeli Practices Affecting the Human Rights of the Palestinian People was published on 15 July 2022, following its annual mission to Amman, Jordan, from 4 to 7 July 2022. The Special Committee stated, "By design, Israel's 55-year occupation of Palestine has been used as a vehicle to serve and protect the interest of a Jewish State and its Jewish people, while subjugating Palestinians", and "Many stakeholders consider that this practice amounts to apartheid."

=== Reports by NGOs ===
==== 2009 legal study of the South African Human Sciences Research Council ====
Following Dugard's report, the Human Sciences Research Council (HSRC) of South Africa commissioned a legal study, completed in 2009, of Israel's practices in the occupied Palestinian territories. The report said that one of South African apartheid's most "notorious" aspects was the "racial enclave policy" manifested in the Black Homelands called bantustans, and that Israel uses similar measures "aimed at preserving demographic superiority of one racial group over the other in certain areas", using security as a pretext. It said Israel's practices in the occupied Palestinian territories correlate almost entirely with the definition of apartheid as established in Article 2 of the International Convention on the Suppression and Punishment of the Crime of Apartheid. It also suggested Israeli practices can be compared to South African laws and practices, including violations of international standards for due process (such as illegal detention); discriminatory privileges based on ascribed ethnicity (legally, as Jewish or non-Jewish); draconian enforced ethnic segregation in all parts of life, including by confining groups to ethnic "reserves and ghettoes"; comprehensive restrictions on individual freedoms, such as movement and expression; a dual legal system based on ethno-national identity (Jewish or Palestinian); denationalization (denial of citizenship); and a special system of laws designed to punish any Palestinian resistance to the system. The study said Jewish Israeli domination over Palestinians "constitutes a breach of the prohibition of apartheid". The report was published in 2012.

Whether Israelis and Palestinians are "racial groups" has been a point of contention in regard to the applicability of the ICSPCA and Article 7 of the Rome Statute. The HSRC's 2009 report states that in the Occupied Palestinian Territories, Jewish and Palestinian identities are "socially constructed as groups distinguished by ancestry or descent as well as nationality, ethnicity, and religion". On this basis, the study says that Israeli Jews and Palestinian Arabs can be considered "racial groups" for the purposes of the definition of apartheid in international law.

==== 2020 Yesh Din ====
In 2020, the Israeli human rights organization Yesh Din said that Israeli treatment of the West Bank's Palestinian population meets the definition of apartheid under both Article 7 of the 2002 Rome Statute, which established the International Criminal Court (ICC), and the International Convention on the Suppression and Punishment of the Crime of Apartheid (ICSPCA) adopted by the United Nations General Assembly, which went into force in 1976.

==== 2021 B'Tselem report ====
In January 2021, Israeli human rights organization B'Tselem issued a report outlining the considerations that led to the conclusion that "the bar for labeling the Israeli regime as apartheid has been met." B'Tselem Executive Director Hagai El-Ad said, "Israel is not a democracy that has a temporary occupation attached to it: it is one regime between the Jordan River and the Mediterranean Sea, and we must look at the full picture and see it for what it is: apartheid."

==== 2021 FIDH statement ====
In March 2021, the International Federation for Human Rights (FIDH) issued a statement saying, "The international community must hold Israel responsible for its crimes of apartheid", citing the work of its member organizations in Israel and Palestine.

==== 2021 Human Rights Watch report ====
In April 2021, Human Rights Watch released a report accusing Israeli officials of the crimes against humanity of apartheid and persecution and calling on the International Criminal Court to investigate "systematic discrimination" against Palestinians, becoming the first major international rights NGO to do so. Its report said that Israeli authorities "have dispossessed, confined, forcibly separated, and subjugated Palestinians by virtue of their identity to varying degrees of intensity". Israel rejected the report, with Strategic Affairs Minister Michael Biton saying it was part of "an ongoing attempt by HRW to undermine the State of Israel's right to exist as the nation state of the Jewish people". Palestinian Prime Minister Mohammad Shtayyeh welcomed HRW's report, urging the ICC to investigate the Israeli officials implicated. The US State Department rejected the report, saying, "It is not the view of this administration that Israel's actions constitute apartheid."

==== 2022 Amnesty report ====
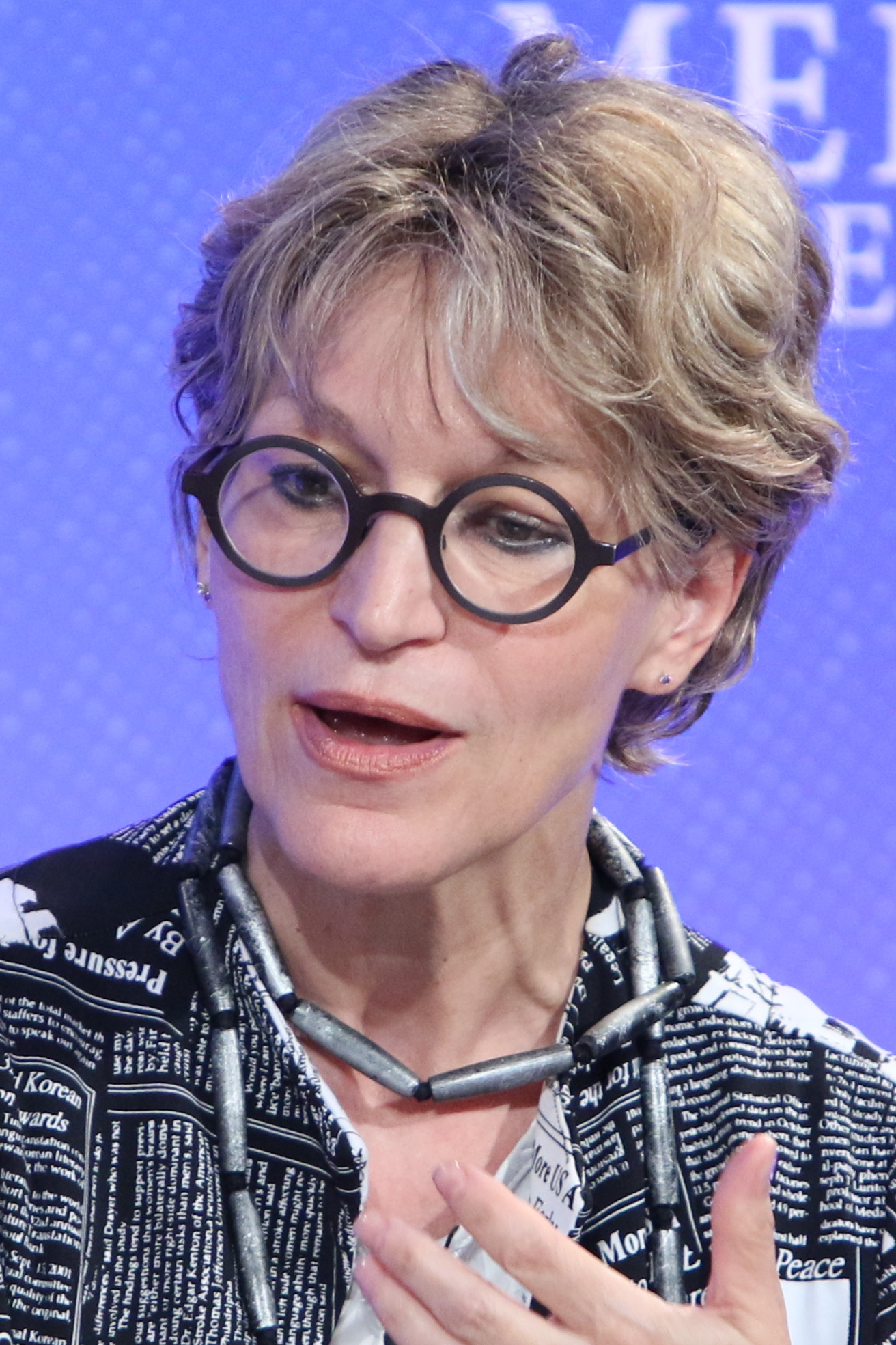
Amnesty secretary general Agnes Callamard dismissed the criticism of its report as shooting the messenger.

On 1 February 2022, Amnesty International published a report, Israel's Apartheid Against Palestinians: Cruel System of Domination and Crime Against Humanity, which stated that Israeli practices in Israel and the occupied territories amount to apartheid and that territorial fragmentation of the Palestinians "serves as a foundational element of the regime of oppression and domination". The report states that, taken together, Israeli practices, including land expropriation, unlawful killings, forced displacement, restrictions on movement, and denial of citizenship rights amount to the crime of apartheid. The report suggested the International Criminal Court include the crime of apartheid as part of its investigations. Even before its release, Israeli officials condemned the report as "false and biased" and antisemitic, accusations that Amnesty secretary general Agnes Callamard dismissed as "baseless attacks, barefaced lies, fabrications on the messenger".

The U.S. State Department rejected the report's conclusions, calling them "absurd", and said "the Jewish people must not be denied their right to self-determination, and we must ensure there isn't a double standard being applied". German Foreign Ministry spokesperson Christopher Burger said: "We reject expressions like 'apartheid' or a one-sided focusing of criticism on Israel. That is not helpful to solving the conflict in the Middle East". A spokesperson for the UK's Foreign and Commonwealth Development Office rejected the terminology used and said breaches of international law can be determined only by the courts. The Dutch foreign minister said his government did not agree with Amnesty's conclusions.

J Street, a nonprofit liberal organization, did not endorse the use of the term apartheid, while discouraging labeling those who use the term "antisemitic". Thirteen Israeli human rights organizations issued a statement defending Amnesty and the report. Omar Shakir, the Israel and Palestine director of Human Rights Watch, which produced a similar report in 2021, said, "There is certainly a consensus in the international human rights movement that Israel is committing apartheid." The Arab League, the OIC, and the Palestinian Authority welcomed the report. (Note: The Palestinian Authority statement said: "The State of Palestine welcomes the report by Amnesty International on Israel's apartheid regime and racist policies and practices against the Palestinian people".)

On 28 September 2022, Al-Haq hosted representatives of Amnesty International, the International Federation for Human Rights and Human Rights Watch in Ramallah. Referring to Israel's outlawing of Palestinian NGOs, Amnesty International's France director of campaigns Nathalie Godard described the "repression of Palestinian civic space" as part of the system of apartheid. She said, "Not only are Palestinians under Israeli military occupation, conducted with manifold violations of international humanitarian law and human rights law, but then also those organizations and human rights defenders who seek to assist people in need are shut down."

In its March 2023 annual report, Amnesty condemned Western countries' "double standards" with respect to Israel. The report said "many Western governments chose instead to attack those denouncing Israel's apartheid system" rather than trying to end it.

==== 2022 jurists statement ====
In March 2022, the International Commission of Jurists said it "strongly condemns Israel's laws, policies and practices of racial segregation, persecution and apartheid against the indigenous Palestinian population in Israel and in the Occupied Palestinian Territories (OPT), comprising the Gaza Strip and the West Bank, including East Jerusalem, and against Palestinian refugees".

==== 2022 ICC submission by Dawn ====
The US-based NGO Democracy for the Arab World Now (DAWN) filed a complaint with the ICC against senior Israeli military lawyer Eyal Toledano for war crimes and crimes against humanity, including apartheid. The submission follows a months-long investigation by the NGO into incidents in the West Bank between 2016 and 2020 and falls within the scope of the current International Criminal Court investigation in Palestine. DAWN Executive Director Sarah Leah Whitson said, "The international legal community, democracies across the world, and in particular the signatories of the Apartheid Convention and Rome Statute have an obligation to reject Israeli apartheid by holding Toledano accountable for his culpability in the crime of apartheid". The Israeli military said it "thoroughly rejects" the claims, which it called "baseless".

=== Overview of reports ===
Human rights lawyer Smadar Ben-Natan analyzed the different reports in terms of temporal and spatial framing, whether they look at the situation from 1948 or from 1967, and whether they include Israel. ESCWA and the Palestinian NGOs take a very broad approach, "arguing that apartheid exists in the entire territory under Israeli control since 1948, being the constitutive logic of the State of Israel (raison d'état)", while Yesh Din focuses only on the occupied territories post-1967. B'tselem includes Israel but limits its scope to post-1967 while the HRW report differs from it in finding that while "the elements of systematic and widespread repression with the intention of maintaining the superiority of one group exist both within Israel and in the OPT, only in the OPT (including East Jerusalem) does the severity of inhumane acts make them criminal." The Amnesty report is "the only report explicitly arguing that crimes of apartheid have been perpetrated inside Israel since 1948, and accordingly considers many Israeli policies as falling under the category of inhumane acts". The UN Special Rapporteur report follows the mandate given and examines only the occupied territory, concluding "that Israel's occupation has turned into a system of apartheid, and that the crime of apartheid is being committed."

According to author Ran Greenstein, "Two features are shared by all the reports: they agree that apartheid is a relevant, indeed essential, concept for the analysis of Israeli rule, and they focus on legal analysis and political arrangements, paying scant attention to social and historical aspects of the evolution of Israeli, Palestinian, and South African societies."

=== Additional views ===
==== Scholarly views ====
In a 2005 book-length study, Heribert Adam of Simon Fraser University and Kogila Moodley of the University of British Columbia wrote that controversy over use of the term arises because Israel is perceived as a uniquely Western democracy in the region and is thus likely to be judged by the standards of such a state. Israel also claims to be a home for the worldwide Jewish diaspora. Adam and Moodley say that Jewish historical suffering has imbued Zionism with a "subjective sense of moral validity" that the ruling white South Africans never had. They also suggest that academic comparisons between Israel and apartheid South Africa leave unanswered the question of "when and how settlers become indigenous", as well as failing to take into account that Israel's Jewish immigrants view themselves as returning home. (Note: Adam and Moodley write, "because people give meaning to their lives and interpret their worlds through these diverse ideological prisms, the perceptions are real and have to be taken seriously".)

In 2007, Gideon Shimoni, professor emeritus of Hebrew University, said the analogy is defamatory and reflects a double standard when applied to Israel and not to neighboring Arab countries, whose policies towards Palestinian minorities have also been described as discriminatory. Shimoni also says that while white people exploited Black Africans within a common South African society, Israel refuses to exploit Palestinians, instead seeking separation and "divorce" from Palestinians for reasons including self-defense. He says the Israel–Palestinian conflict reflects "the tragic clash between two self-defined national entities, each aspiring to national self-determination in the same territory".

An August 2021 survey found that 65% of academic experts on the Middle East described Israel as a "one-state reality akin to apartheid". Seven months earlier, that percentage was 59%. Attitudes may have shifted due to two key events during this time: the planned evictions of Palestinians in East Jerusalem, which may have highlighted the unequal treatment of Jews and Palestinians under Israeli control (and which led to the 2021 Israel-Palestine crisis); and the reports published by the Israeli-based B'Tselem and the US-based Human Rights Watch, which suggested that there is an apartheid reality in Israel and the Palestinian territories, and that Israel's behavior fits the legal definition of apartheid, respectively.

On 14 April 2023, Foreign Policy released a feature-length article, Israel's One-State Reality, co-authored by Michael Barnett, Nathan Brown, Marc Lynch, and Shibley Telhami. The authors wrote that the "illusion of a two-state solution" had been shattered by the return of Benjamin Netanyahu at the head of a far-right Israeli coalition, and called on the U.S. government to "stop shielding Israel in international organizations" when confronted by accusations of violations of international law. It concluded that "the one-state reality demands more. Looked at through that prism, Israel resembles an apartheid state."

In August 2023, more than 1,500 U.S., Israeli, Jewish, and Palestinian academics and public figures signed an open letter stating that Israel operates "a regime of apartheid" and calling on U.S. Jewish groups to speak out against the occupation in Palestine.

==== Palestinian views ====
On 8 June 2021, the Palestine Liberation Organization released a report titled It is Apartheid: The Reality of Israel's Colonial Occupation of Palestine. In a 6 June 2022 editorial, Israeli newspaper Haaretz wrote that Israeli settlements are made possible by a "mechanism that maintains apartheid in the West Bank"; the editorial mentions "the existence of two separate legal systems in the same territory, one for Israelis (that is, Jews) and one for Palestinians, as well as two separate justice systems. There's a military justice system for subjects without [Israeli] citizenship who live under a military dictatorship, and there's a second system for privileged Jews with Israeli citizenship, who live under Israeli law in a territory that's not under Israeli sovereignty".

==== Israeli views ====
A number of sitting Israeli premiers have warned that Israel could become like apartheid South Africa. In 1976, Prime Minister Yitzhak Rabin warned that Israel risked becoming an apartheid state if it annexed and absorbed the West Bank's Arab population. In 2007, Prime Minister Ehud Olmert warned that if the two-state solution collapsed, Israel would "face a South African-style struggle for equal voting rights, and as soon as that happens, the state of Israel is finished".

On 8 June 2021, two former Israeli ambassadors to South Africa, Ilan Baruch and Alon Liel, wrote in an opinion piece for South African news website GroundUp, "It is time for the world to recognize that what we saw in South Africa decades ago is happening in the occupied Palestinian territories too."

United Arab List leader Mansour Abbas said he would not use the term apartheid to describe relations between Jews and Arabs inside Israel, pointing out that his Ra'am party was a member of the Israeli ruling coalition of the thirty-sixth government of Israel. Hadash leader Ayman Odeh has said, "in [Israel's] infrastructure and ... law there is apartheid toward the Palestinian citizens [Israeli Arabs]".

Former Attorney General of Israel Michael Ben-Yair said, "It is with great sadness that I must also conclude that my country has sunk to such political and moral depths that it is now an apartheid regime. It is time for the international community to recognise this reality as well."

As of 12 February 2023, 12 Israeli human rights groups had voiced their support for the Amnesty report and condemned the European Commission's negative reaction to it. These groups were Adalah, B'Tselem, Breaking the Silence, Combatants for Peace, Gisha, HaMoked, Haqel: In Defense of Human Rights, Human Rights Defenders Fund, Ofek: The Israeli Center for Public Affairs, Physicians for Human Rights–Israel, and Yesh Din.

A March 2023 position paper by the Israeli Law Professors' Forum for Democracy, a group of 120 Israeli law professors, stated that recent changes introduced by the Netanyahu government "validate the claim that Israel practices apartheid". Specifically, the group criticized the 23 February power-sharing agreement signed between the Likud parliamentary faction and the Religious Zionism faction granting the far-right leader of Religious Zionism, Bezalel Smotrich, special authority over the occupied West Bank. The professors argue that this transfer of responsibility to civilian hands violates international law, specifically the 1907 Hague Conventions. The Biden administration criticized this aspect of the power-sharing agreement, calling it a step toward annexation; a Haaretz editorial stated, "In light of the fact that there is no intention of granting civil rights to the millions of Palestinians living in the West Bank, the result of the agreement is a formal, full-fledged apartheid regime."

On 13 August 2023, former IDF Northern Command commander Amiram Levin said: "There are MKs in the government who came from the West Bank and do not know what democracy is. 57 years of absolute apartheid. The IDF is standing by and beginning to be complicit in war crimes. Walk around Hebron and you will see streets where Arabs cannot walk, just like what happened in Germany".

On 6 September 2023, former Mossad head Tamir Pardo said that Israel had imposed apartheid in the West Bank. He argued that "two people are judged under two legal systems" because Israel had imposed martial law on the Palestinians while Jewish settlers in West Bank are governed by civilian courts.

Israel and its supporters frequently call apartheid accusations antisemitic. Human rights specialists, scholars, and others argue that this criticism constitutes a weaponization of antisemitism accusations.

==== American views ====
In 1975, former United States Ambassador to the United Nations Daniel Patrick Moynihan voiced the United States' strong disagreement with United Nations General Assembly Resolution 3379, which stated "Zionism is a form of racism and racial discrimination", saying that unlike apartheid, Zionism is not a racist ideology. He said that racist ideologies such as apartheid favor discrimination on the grounds of alleged biological differences, yet few peoples are as biologically heterogeneous as the Jews. Moynihan called the UN resolution "a great evil", adding, "the abomination of anti-Semitism has been given the appearance of international sanction by the UN". National Urban League executive director Vernon Jordan said the resolution smeared the "racist" label on Zionism, adding that Black people could "easily smell out the fact that 'anti-Zionism' in this context is a code word for anti-Semitism". The General Assembly's resolution equating Zionism with racism was revoked in 1991.

In 2014, U.S. Secretary of State John Kerry warned that if Israel did not make peace soon with a two-state solution, it could become an apartheid state. Former South African state president F. W. de Klerk, who negotiated to end his country's apartheid regime, later said: "You have Palestinians living in Israel with full political rights. You don't have discriminatory laws against them, I mean not letting them swim on certain beaches or anything like that. I think it's unfair to call Israel an apartheid state. If John Kerry did so, I think he made a mistake." The interviewer clarified that Kerry had stressed that Israel was not at present an apartheid state.

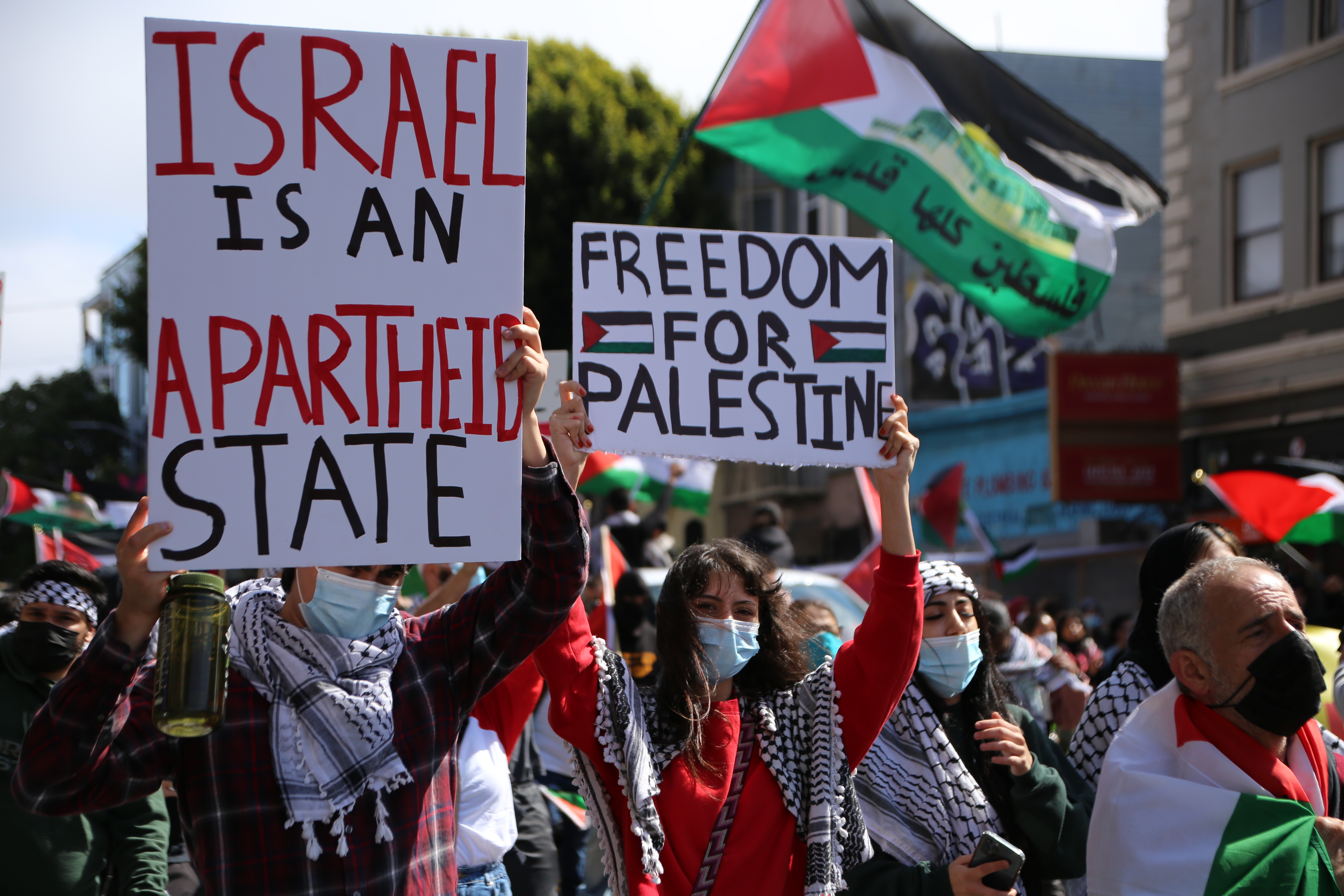
Pro-Palestinian protest in San Francisco, 15 May 2021

In an opinion survey commissioned by the Jewish Electorate Institute after the 2021 Israel–Palestine crisis, 34% agreed that "Israel's treatment of Palestinians is similar to racism in the United States", 25% agreed that "Israel is an apartheid state", and 22% agreed that "Israel is committing genocide against the Palestinians". The percentages were higher among younger voters, of whom more than a third agreed that Israel is an apartheid state.

In a July 2022 interview, U.S. President Joe Biden was asked about "voices in the Democratic Party" who "say that Israel is an apartheid state, calling for an end of unconditional aid." He responded: "There are a few of them. I think they're wrong. I think they're making a mistake. Israel is a democracy. Israel is our ally."

A 27 March – 5 April 2023, Ipsos/University of Maryland poll found that when given choices for how they viewed Israel, 56% of the respondents said that they did not know. Of the remainder, 9% of respondents believed that Israel was a vibrant democracy, 13% said it was a flawed democracy, 7% said it was a state with restricted minority rights, and 13% said it was "a state with segregation similar to apartheid".

In July 2023, the U.S. House of Representatives passed a resolution, 412–9, declaring that "The State of Israel is not a racist or apartheid state, Congress rejects all forms of antisemitism and xenophobia, and the United States will always be a staunch partner and supporter of Israel."

A 2023 Gallup survey found that Democrats' sympathies lie more with Palestinians than Israelis by a margin of 49% to 38%. In addition to the Ipsos poll, a June 2023 poll found that "in the absence of a two-state solution to the Israeli-Palestinian conflict, three-quarters of Americans would choose a democratic Israel that is no longer Jewish over a Jewish Israel that denies full citizenship and equality to non-Jews."

==== European views ====
In May 2021, then French foreign minister Jean-Yves Le Drian warned of "the risk of 'long-lasting apartheid' in Israel in the event that the Palestinians fail to obtain their own state" and that "Even the status quo produces that". Commenting on the clashes between Arabs and Jews in some Israeli towns, he concluded that this "clearly shows that if in the future we had a solution other than the two-state solution, we would have the ingredients of long-lasting apartheid."

In February 2022, Prime Minister Jean Castex of France read a speech on behalf of President Emmanuel Macron to the Representative Council of Jewish Institutions in France (CRIF) and said "How dare we talk about apartheid in a state where Arab citizens are represented in government and positions of leadership and responsibility?"

In June 2022 the Catalan Parliament passed a resolution that "Israel commits the crime of apartheid against the Palestinian people" and calling upon the Generalitat de Catalunya to avoid any support for the Israeli regime and to aid in implementing the recommendations of the Amnesty and Human Rights Watch reports.

In a joint press conference with Palestinian President Mahmoud Abbas in August 2022, German Chancellor Olaf Scholz rejected Abbas's comparison of Israel to apartheid and said "Regarding the Israeli politics we have a different assessment. I want to say clearly that I won't use the word 'apartheid' and I don't believe it is right to use the term to describe the situation".

On 13 January 2023, in response to questions from the EU parliament, EU high representative for foreign affairs and security policy Josep Borrell wrote, "The Commission is aware of the reports referred to by the Honourable Members and is giving them due attention. In any case, the Commission considers that it is not appropriate to use the term apartheid in connection with the State of Israel." In response, 12 Israeli human rights organizations, including B'tselem and Yesh Din, issued a statement condemning Borrell's remarks and calling on the EU Commission "to engage with the facts on which legal designations of apartheid regarding various aspects of Israel's treatment of Palestinians are based, and to reconsider its position in this regard."

On 8 February 2023, the mayor of Barcelona cut ties with Israeli institutions "due to its 'apartheid policy' towards Palestinians" and announced that the city is no longer twinned with Tel Aviv. In response, Madrid's mayor offered to partner with Tel Aviv instead, denouncing Barcelona's move as having a "clear antisemitic overtone".

In March 2023, the UK and Israel signed "The 2030 Roadmap for UK-Israeli Bilateral Relations", which said, "The UK and Israel will work together to tackle the singling out of Israel in the Human Rights Council as well as in other international bodies. In this context, the UK and Israel disagree with the use of the term 'apartheid' with regard to Israel."

In July 2023, departing EU Ambassador to the Palestinians Sven Kühn von Burgsdorff said: "I have my personal view on that matter, but I'm still a diplomat until the 31st of July and have to represent my headquarters on that matter. However, I would certainly be on the right side of history if I were to say that one should not suppress the discussion of whether actually what we're seeing on the ground constitutes or doesn't constitute the crime of apartheid", and insisted it was a question to be decided by international courts, not politicians.

Responding to Felix Klein, Germany's commissioner for Jewish Life and the Fight Against Anti-Semitism, Jewish history professor Amos Goldberg wrote in the Frankfurter Allgemeine Zeitung on 23 August 2023 that the Israeli government fights against human rights, democracy, and equality, and promotes the opposite—"authoritarianism, discrimination, racism and apartheid"—and that "Accusing Israel of apartheid is not anti-Semitic. It describes reality". Klein gave an interview to Die Welt on 5 August 2023 during which, in response to Middle East scholar Muriel Assenburg, who had earlier said that Israel is "prima facie committing the crime of apartheid in the occupied territories", he said, "To accuse Israel of apartheid delegitimizes the Jewish state and is therefore an anti-Semitic narrative."

==== African views ====
In February 2022, the Assembly of the African Union passed a resolution calling for the dismantlement of Israeli apartheid in the State of Palestine and recommended boycotting "the Israeli colonial system and illegal settlements" to end apartheid. The same declaration was renewed at the Union's Summit in 2023.

On 26 July 2022, South African Foreign Minister Naledi Pandor said that Israel should be considered an apartheid state. In her remarks to the 2022 UNGA on 22 September 2022, she said, "We cannot ignore the words of the former Israeli negotiator at the Oslo talks, Daniel Levy, who addressed the UN Security Council recently and referred to 'the increasingly weighty body of scholarly, legal and public opinion that has designated Israel to be perpetrating apartheid in the territories under its control'."

==== Other countries ====
Foreign governments who have used the word apartheid to describe the situation in Israel or in the Israeli-occupied territories include those of Bahrain, Bangladesh, Bolivia, Cuba, Iran, Iraq, Lebanon, Nicaragua, North Korea, Pakistan, Qatar, Saudi Arabia, and Venezuela.

In April 2025, the 24th Congress of the Communist Party of India (Marxist) adopted a resolution declaring Israel an apartheid state.

==== Faith-based groups ====
On 18 July 2021, the General Synod of the United Church of Christ adopted a resolution, denounced by the American Jewish Committee's director of media relations, that, among other criticism, refers to Israel's "apartheid system of laws and legal procedures".

On 28 June 2022, the U.S. Presbyterian Church passed a resolution stating that "Israel's laws, policies and practices regarding the Palestinian people fulfill the international legal definition of apartheid".

On 8 September 2022, the World Council of Churches adopted a statement that included a call for "The WCC to study, discuss and discern the implications of the recent reports by B'tselem, Human Rights Watch and Amnesty International, and for its governing bodies to respond appropriately." After much debate, the statement also read, "Recently, numerous international, Israeli and Palestinian human rights organizations and legal bodies have published studies and reports describing the policies and actions of Israel as amounting to 'apartheid' under international law. Within this Assembly, some churches and delegates strongly support the utilization of this term as accurately describing the reality of the people in Palestine/Israel and the position under international law, while others find it inappropriate, unhelpful and painful. We are not of one mind on this matter". In June 2025, the Council concluded that Israel was practicing apartheid, and called for divestment and sanctions.

On 6 June 2023, the Apartheid-Free Communities Initiative launched, bringing together "over 100 congregations, faith groups, and organizations as an interdenominational campaign working to end the crime of apartheid committed against Palestinians."

On 29 July 2023, the Christian Church (Disciples of Christ) adopted a resolution stating "that many of the laws, policies and practices of the State of Israel meet the definition of apartheid as defined in international law."

The Anglican Church of Southern Africa passed a resolution on 27 September 2023 declaring Israel an apartheid state and reviewing pilgrimages to the Holy Land.

==== Other views ====
In 2017, Jacques De Maio, then Head of Delegation of the International Committee of the Red Cross, Israel and the Occupied Territories, denied there is apartheid, saying there is "no regime of superiority of race, of denial of basic human rights to a group of people because of their alleged racial inferiority. There is a bloody national conflict, whose most prominent and tragic characteristic is its continuation over the years, decades-long, and there is a state of occupation. Not apartheid."

In November 2020, Haaretz reported that Wikipedia's "West Bank bantustans" article comparing Israel's control of the West Bank to the Black-only enclaves in apartheid-era South Africa indicated a possible shift for Wikipedia's consensus on likening Israel to an apartheid regime. Wikipedia editors said that the article's having survived a deletion proposal indicated that events such as the Trump peace plan and Benjamin Netanyahu's pledge to annex parts of the West Bank undermined Israel's talking point that it supported a two-state solution and strove to establish a Palestinian state.

On 9 September 2022, hundreds of Google and Amazon workers protested cloud contracts made with the Israeli government known as Project Nimbus. Some protesters in San Francisco held signs reading, "Another Google Worker Against Apartheid" and "No Tech For Apartheid". Palestinian employees claim "institutionalized bias" within Google, with one saying it had become impossible to express disagreement with Israel's treatment of Palestinians without "being called into a HR [sic] meeting with the threat of retaliation".

Former United Nations Secretary General Ban Ki-moon and Mary Robinson, chair of The Elders and former president of Ireland and UN human rights commissioner, visited Israel and the Palestinian territories on 22 June 2023. Ban said the situation had become worse since he was at the UN and there were signs that an apartheid system was taking root: "I'm just thinking that, as many people are saying, that this may constitute apartheid." (Note: On 29 June 2021, Ban Ki-moon, UN secretary general from 2007 to 2016, wrote in an opinion piece for the Financial Times, "This gives the dual legal regimes imposed in Palestinian territories by Israel—together with the inhumane and abusive acts that are carried out against Palestinians—new significance, resulting in a situation that arguably constitutes apartheid".) Robinson said that in every meeting they attended "we heard the word 'apartheid'".

An August 2023 open letter signed by more than 2,000 U.S., Israeli, Jewish and Palestinian academics and public figures stated that Israel operates "a regime of apartheid". Signatories included Israeli historian Benny Morris, former Jewish Agency head Avraham Burg, and Israeli American Holocaust expert Omer Bartov, who said Israel's 37th government had brought "a very radical shift".

In October 2023, Craig Mokhiber, a director of the Office of the United Nations High Commissioner for Human Rights, accused Israel of apartheid in his resignation letter. In February 2024, Amnesty International chair Agnes Callamard said, "The occupation has enabled and entrenched Israel's system of apartheid imposed on all Palestinians".

A November 2023 poll asked Canadians whether "Israel's policy towards Palestinians is a form of apartheid"; 43% agreed, 27% disagreed and 30% were unsure.

== Comments from South Africans ==
Anglican Archbishop and Nobel Peace Prize winner Desmond Tutu commented on the similarities between South Africa and Palestine and the importance of international pressure in ending apartheid in South Africa. He drew a parallel between the movement to end Israeli occupation and the international pressure that helped end apartheid in South Africa, saying: "If apartheid ended, so can the occupation, but the moral force and international pressure will have to be just as determined." In 2014, Tutu urged the General Assembly of the Presbyterian Church in the United States to divest from companies that contributed to the occupation, saying that Israel "has created an apartheid reality within its borders and through its occupation", and that the alternative to Israel being "an apartheid state in perpetuity" was to end the occupation through either a one-state solution or a two-state solution.

American scholar Howard Friel wrote that Tutu "views the conditions in the occupied Palestinian territories as resembling apartheid in South Africa." BBC News reported in 2012 that Tutu "accused Israel of practicing apartheid in its policies towards Palestinians." Both Friel and Israeli author Uri Davis have quoted the following comment from Tutu, published in the Guardian in 2002, in their own work: "I was deeply distressed in my visit to the Holy Land; it reminded me so much of what has happened to us black people in South Africa." Davis discusses Tutu's remark in his book Apartheid Israel: Possibilities for the Struggle Within, in which he argues that "fundamental apartheid structures of the Israeli polity" with respect to property inheritance rights, access to state land and water resources and access to state welfare resources "fully justify the classification of Israel as an apartheid State."

Other prominent South African anti-apartheid activists have used apartheid comparisons to criticize the occupation of the West Bank, and particularly the construction of the separation barrier. These include Farid Esack, a writer who was then a visiting professor at Harvard Divinity School, as well as Ronnie Kasrils, Winnie Madikizela-Mandela, Denis Goldberg, and Arun Gandhi.

In 2008, a delegation of African National Congress (ANC) veterans visited Israel and the Occupied Territories, and said that in some respects it was worse than apartheid. In May 2018, in the aftermath of the Gaza border protests, the ANC issued a statement comparing the actions of Palestinians to "our struggle against the apartheid regime". It also accused the Israeli military of "the same cruelty" as Hitler, and said that "all South Africans must rise up and treat Israel like the pariah that it is". Around the same time, the South African government withdrew indefinitely its ambassador to Israel, Sisa Ngombane, to protest "the indiscriminate and grave manner of the latest Israeli attack".

Human rights lawyer Fatima Hassan, a member of the 2008 ANC delegation, cited the separate roads, different registration of cars, the indignity of having to produce a permit, and long queues at checkpoints as worse than what black South Africans had experienced during apartheid. But she also thought the apartheid comparison was a potential "red herring": "the context is different and the debate on whether this is Apartheid or not deflects from the real issue of occupation, encroachment of more land, building of the wall and the indignity of the occupation and the conduct of the military and police. I saw the check point at Nablus, I met with Palestinians in Hebron, I met the villagers who are against the wall—I met Israelis and Palestinians who have lost family members, their land and homes. They have not lost hope though—and they believe in a joint struggle against the occupation and are willing in non-violent means to transform the daily direct and indirect forms of injustice and violence. To sum up, there is a transgression that is continuing unabated—call it what you want, apartheid/separation/closure/security—it remains a transgression".

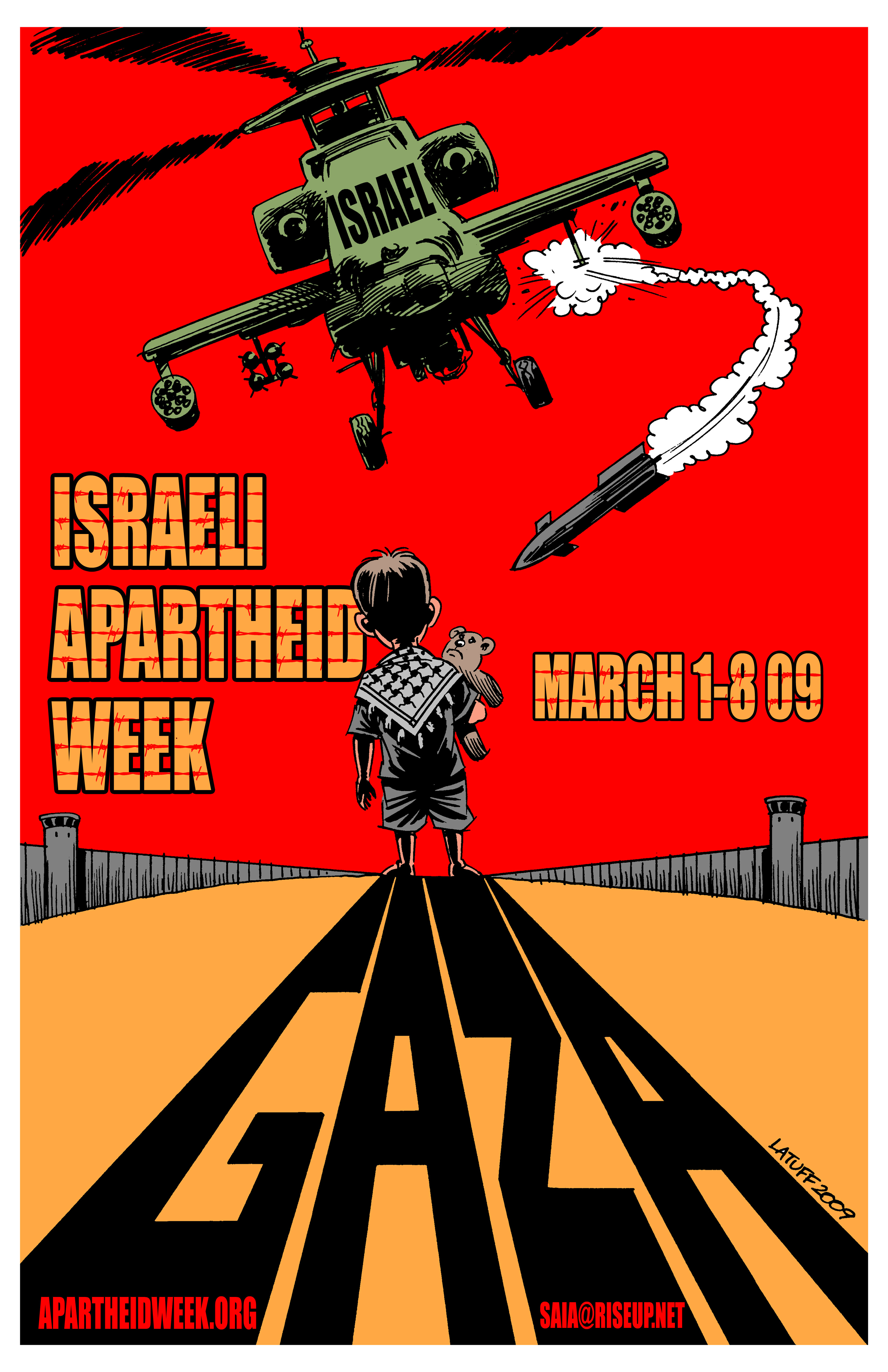
Poster for the 2009 Israeli Apartheid Week, designed by Carlos Latuff

Sasha Polakow-Suransky notes that Israel's labour policies are very different from those of apartheid-era South Africa, that Israel has never enacted miscegenation laws, and that liberation movements in South Africa and Palestine have had different "aspirations and tactics". Still, he argues that the apartheid analogy is likely to gain further legitimacy in coming years unless Israel moves to dismantle West Bank settlements and create a viable Palestinian state. Polakow-Suransky also writes that the response of Israel's defenders to the analogy since 2007 has been "knee-jerk" and based on "vitriol and recycled propaganda" rather than an honest assessment of the situation.

After Benjamin Netanyahu announced the proposed Israeli annexation of the West Bank in 2020, South-African born Israeli writer Benjamin Pogrund, a longtime critic of the analogy between Israeli occupational practices and apartheid, commented that if implemented, such a plan would alter his assessment: "[At] least it has been a military occupation. Now we are going to put other people under our control and not give them citizenship. That is apartheid. That is an exact mirror of what apartheid was [in South Africa]." In an August 2023 opinion piece for Haaretz, Pogrund wrote, "In Israel, I am now witnessing the apartheid with which I grew up."

Incumbent South African president Cyril Ramaphosa has also compared Israel's treatment of Palestinians to apartheid.

In 2024, Anton Harber and Irwin Manoim, the founders and editors of the South African newspaper Weekly Mail, wrote in a letter to the editor of Haaretz, "The Netanyahu government's sanctions against Ha'aretz have brought back vivid memories of our own newspaper's struggle against the apartheid government about four decades ago."

== See also ==
- Crime of apartheid
- Absentees' Property Laws
- Allegations of apartheid by country
- Settler colonialism
- Zionism as settler colonialism
- Israeli-occupied territories
- Israeli Apartheid Week
- Elections in the Israeli-occupied territories
- Ethnic profiling in Israel
- Racism in Israel
- Collective punishment
- New antisemitism
- Palestinian political violence
- Persecution of Muslims
- Human rights violations against Palestinians by Israel
- United Nations General Assembly Resolution 3379
- Noel Ignatiev § Encyclopedia of Race and Racism
- List of pro‑Palestinian advocacy organizations
