= Hafrada =

Israeli separation policy

Hafrada (Hebrew: הפרדה, lit. 'separation, disengagement') is the policy of the government of Israel to separate the Israeli population from the Palestinian population in the occupied Palestinian territories, in both the West Bank and the Gaza Strip.

Yitzhak Rabin, Israeli prime minister from 1992 to 1995, was the first to advocate for the construction of a physical barrier between Israelis and Palestinians. Following the 1995 Beit Lid suicide bombing that killed 22 Israelis, Rabin stated that separation is necessary to protect the majority of Israeli Jews from Palestinian terrorism. Ehud Barak, prime minister from 1999 to 2001, stated that "good fences make good neighbors". Since its first public introductions, the concept-turned-policy or paradigm has dominated Israeli political and cultural discourse and debate.

The separation policy was maintained by successive Israeli governments, which constructed the Israel-Gaza barrier and the Israeli West Bank barrier (Geder Ha'hafrada, Hebrew for "separation fence"). In 2005, Israel carried out the disengagement from Gaza, which included the evacuation of Israeli settlements and the IDF from the Gaza Strip. The West Bank closures have also been cited as an example of the policy.

Other names for hafrada when discussed in English include unilateral separation or unilateral disengagement. Aaron Klieman has distinguished between partition plans based on "hafrada", which he translated as "detachment"; and "hipardut", translated as "disengagement." The Hebrew word Hafrada can imply both "separation" and "segregation." Critics have linked the Hafrada policy to apartheid, and others argue the word "hafrada" bears a "striking similarity" to the South African use of the term.

In 2014, United Nations special rapporteur Richard A. Falk used the term repeatedly in his "Report of the Special Rapporteur on the situation of human rights in the Palestinian territories occupied since 1967".

== History ==
=== 1990s ===
Yitzhak Rabin was the first to propose the creation of a physical barrier between Israelis and Palestinians in 1992, and by 1994, construction on the first barrier – the Gaza-Israel barrier – had begun. In January 1995, the Palestinian Islamic Jihad carried out a double suicide bombing at the Beit Lid Junction near Netanya, killing 22 Israelis. Following the attack, Rabin specified the objectives behind the undertaking, stating that

This path must lead to a separation, though not according to the borders prior to 1967. We want to reach a separation between us and them. We do not want a majority of the Jewish residents of the state of Israel, 98% of whom live within the borders of sovereign Israel, including a united Jerusalem, to be subject to terrorism.

The first Israeli politician to campaign successfully on a platform based explicitly on separation, under the slogan of "Us here. Them there," was Ehud Barak.

In the U.S.-based journal Policy Review, Eric Rozenman wrote:

Barak explained hafrada – separation – this way in 1998: "We should separate ourselves from the Palestinians physically, following the recommendation of the American poet Robert Frost, who once wrote that good fences make good neighbors. Leave them behind [outside] the borders that will be agreed upon, and build Israel."

The adoption by the Israeli government of a policy of separation is generally credited to the ideas and analysis of Daniel Schueftan as expressed in his 1999 book, Korah Ha'hafrada: Yisrael Ve Harashut Ha'falestinit or Disengagement: Israel and the Palestinian Entity. An alternate translation for the title in English reads, "The Need for Separation: Israel and the Palestinian Authority". In it, Schueftan reviews new and existing arguments underlying different separation stances, in order to make the case for separation from the Palestinians, beginning with those in the West Bank and Gaza. Schueftan favours the "hard separation" stances of politicians like Yitzhak Rabin and Ehud Barak, while characterizing the stance of politicians like Shimon Peres, as "soft separation".

After assuming office in 1999, Barak moved to "stimulate cabinet discussion of separation" by distributing copies of Haifa University Professor Dan Schueftan's manifesto, Disengagement, to his ministers. The separation policy was subsequently adopted by Israel's National Security Council, where Schueftan has also served as an advisor. According to Gershon Baskin and Sharon Rosenberg, Schueftan's book appears to be "the working manual for the IDF and wide Israeli political circles" for the implementation and "unilateral construction of walls and fences."

=== 2000s ===
The Second Intifada, a large Palestinian uprising against Israel, lasted from 2000 to 2005. This period was marked by intensive and numerous Palestinian suicide bombings, the majority of which were directed towards Israeli citizens. Between 2001 and 2005, these suicide bombs killed 491 Israeli citizens, turning civilian life into a battleground. As a result, the Israeli government abandoned hopes for a diplomatic resolution to the conflict and embraced a strategy of unilateral disengagement.

In February 2001, Meir Indor, lieutenant colonel in the Israeli Defense Forces, submitted that "hafrada (separation) – they are there and we are here" had become the "new ideology" and "new word for those who fantastize about peace". Indor aimed strong criticism toward Ariel Sharon's proposed peace agreement put forward during the 2001 elections in which Sharon claimed he would provide "peace and security" by making "a hafrada the length and breadth of the land". Indor stated that in his opinion, "If it were possible to make a hafrada, it would have been done a long time ago." He also noted that, "Binyamin Ben Eliezer himself said hafrada is impossible to implement." In 2002, Rochelle Furstenberg of Hadassah magazine reported that the concept of "unilateral disengagement" had been unknown to the public eight months previous, but that the notion had gained momentum.

In 2002, the Ariel Sharon government began work on the Israeli West Bank barrier at the Seam Area. Israel has since maintained that the barrier is vital to keep Palestinian attackers out of Israeli cities. The barrier has been described by Daniel Schueftan as constituting "the physical part of the strategy" of unilateral separation. Schueftan has explained that "It makes the strategy possible because you cannot say 'this is what I will incorporate and this is what I will exclude' without having a physical barrier that prevents movement between the two."

In 2005, Israel carried out the disengagement from Gaza (Hebrew: תוכנית ההתנתקות, romanized: Tokhnit HaHitnatkut, lit. 'disengagement plan'), a unilateral dismantling in 2005 of the 21 Israeli settlements in the Gaza Strip and the evacuation of Israeli settlers and army from inside the Gaza Strip. Prime Minister Ariel Sharon had originally dubbed his unilateral disengagement plan – in Hebrew, Tokhnit HaHitnatkut or Tokhnit HaHinatkut – the "separation plan" or Tokhnit HaHafrada before realizing that "separation sounded bad, particularly in English, because it evoked apartheid." The plan was put before the Israeli public in mid-December 2003. Formally adopted by the Israeli government and enacted in August 2005, the unilateral disengagement plan resulted in the dismantlement of all settlements in the Gaza Strip and four in the northern West Bank. Schueftan has characterized Sharon's unilateral disengagement plan as only the first step in a "wider historical process".

Telling The Jerusalem Report in 2005 that he could "even pin the dates on it", he suggested that in 2007 or 2008, there would be another major disengagement in the West Bank; and that before 2015, Israel would unilaterally repartition Jerusalem along lines of its own choosing. Schueftan argued that the "underlying feature" of disengagement is not that it will bring peace, but rather that it will prevent "perpetual terror".

Implementation of hafrada continued under the government of Prime Minister Ehud Olmert.

== Analysis and debate ==
In October 2000, Ha’aretz journalist Gideon Levy commented in the Courrier International that public support by an overwhelming majority for "hafrada" was an outgrowth of the average Israeli's indifference to the history and lot of the Palestinians – which he contrasted with Israel's demand that Palestinians study the Holocaust to understand Jewish motivations.

In Mapping Jewish Identities, published that same year (2000), Adi Ophir submitted that support for what he calls "the major element of the apartheid system – the so-called separation (hafrada) between Israelis and Palestinians", among Zionists who speak in favor of human rights is attributable to internal contradictions in Zionist ideology.

In 2002, a television broadcast of The McLaughlin Group on the subject of Israel's separation policy opened with the words: "Jews call it hafrada, 'separation', in Hebrew. Critics call it apartheid. The more technical neo-nomenclature is, quote, unquote, 'unilateral disengagement'. It's an idea that has gained ground in Israel."

According to Smith and Cordell, implementation of the Hafrada policy is considered to use cultural autonomy as an excuse for enforced segregation.

== Notable usage examples ==
=== By Israelis ===
- Eitan Harel, professor of biology at Hebrew University in Jerusalem, told Le Monde Diplomatique in May 1996: "Our priorities have changed. The dream of a Greater Israel has been replaced by the reality of a small Israel. What matters to people is to live better here, and if you ask them what they wish for and wait for, the majority response is : hafrada, separation."
- Esther Zandberg described an art exhibition entitled "Hafrada (Separation)" in a June 2005 edition of Ha'aretz as consisting of pictures of 12 separation sites photographed by Yair Barak, Orit Siman-Tov and Amit Grun that represent, "apartheid walls between Caesarea and Jisr al-Zarka and between Nir Zvi and the Arab neighborhood of Pardes Snir in Lod; the architectural monstrosity of the Carmel Beach Towers in Haifa, which stick up like a raised fist opposite the distressed neighborhood of Neveh David; the threatening wall surrounding the luxury residential Holyland neighborhood in Jerusalem; and several other sites."
- In a paper entitled "Nishul (Displacement): Israel's Form of Apartheid," Jeff Halper of the Israeli Committee Against House Demolitions, wrote that: "Hafrada (Apartheid in Afrikaans) is the official Hebrew term for Israel's vision and policy towards the Palestinians of the Occupied Territories – and, it could be argued (with qualifications), within Israel itself."

=== By Palestinians ===
- Since 2003, Reverend Naim Ateek of Palestinian Christian Ecumenical Liberation Theology Center, Sabeel, based in Jerusalem has insisted on using the term hafrada to describe Israel's policies toward the Palestinians, while noting its similarity in meaning to the word apartheid.
- In a 2006 discussion on the prospects for peaceful resolution to the Israeli–Palestinian conflict sponsored by The Institute of Strategic and Development Studies, Mazin B. Qumsiyeh, a former Yale professor and geneticist and advocate for a one-state solution, said: "Now, Israel today uses a new word. You probably have heard it mistranslated. In Hebrew it's called hafrada. Hafrada means literally segregation or separation. But in the worst Israeli propaganda machine at CNN and other news outlets, they use the word 'convergence'—you heard about Olmert's convergence. Convergence doesn't mean anything. What is convergence? It's not a translation of hafrada. Hafrada means segregation, separation; that's what it means."

=== By activists and advocacy organizations ===
- The Israeli West Bank Barrier or Geder Ha'hafrada is known in some activist circles as the Hafrada Wall.
- In 2006, James Bowen wrote in an opinion editorial in Haaretz that he and fellow activists from the Ireland Palestine Solidarity Campaign see, "hafrada (separation) [a]s the Zionist form of apartheid" and argued that "Israel should be treated like the old South Africa."
- In a 30 May 2006 media communique entitled Sunday Herald's Linguistics Gymnastics, Honest Reporting UK addressed the use of the word hafrada by Sunday Herald editor David Pratt. It stated that "just a cursory glance at a Hebrew–English dictionary reveals that the term 'Hafrada' does not literally mean 'apartheid'. Also, as a concept, 'Hafrada' has certainly not entered the Israeli lexicon, but rather, the term 'Geder Hafrada' ('Separation Fence') referring to Israel's security barrier. Thus, Pratt deliberately and dishonestly claims that Israelis have begun to privately use their own term for 'apartheid' while inaccurately stating that Israel's security barrier and the apartheid ideology are one and the same."

=== By journalists ===
- On 26 May 2006, David Pratt, Scottish Sunday Herald Foreign Editor wrote that: "Even among Israelis, the term 'Hafrada', 'separation or apartheid in Hebrew' has entered the mainstream lexicon, despite strident denials by the Jewish state that it is engaged in any such process."
- In a January 2007 article entitled "Further footnotes on Zionism, Yoder and Boyarin", Alain Epp Weaver wrote that it was, "strategic demographic and territorial goals" that gave birth to "a policy of hafrada, Hebrew for separation."

== See also ==
- Citizenship and Entry into Israel Law
- Israeli apartheid
- Israeli disengagement from the Gaza Strip
- Law of Return
- Realignment plan
- Seam Zone

== Bibliography ==
- Smith, David J.; Cordell, Karl (18 October 2013). Cultural Autonomy in Contemporary Europe. Routledge. ISBN 978-1-317-96851-1.
