= Ilan Baruch =

Israeli plein air landscape painter

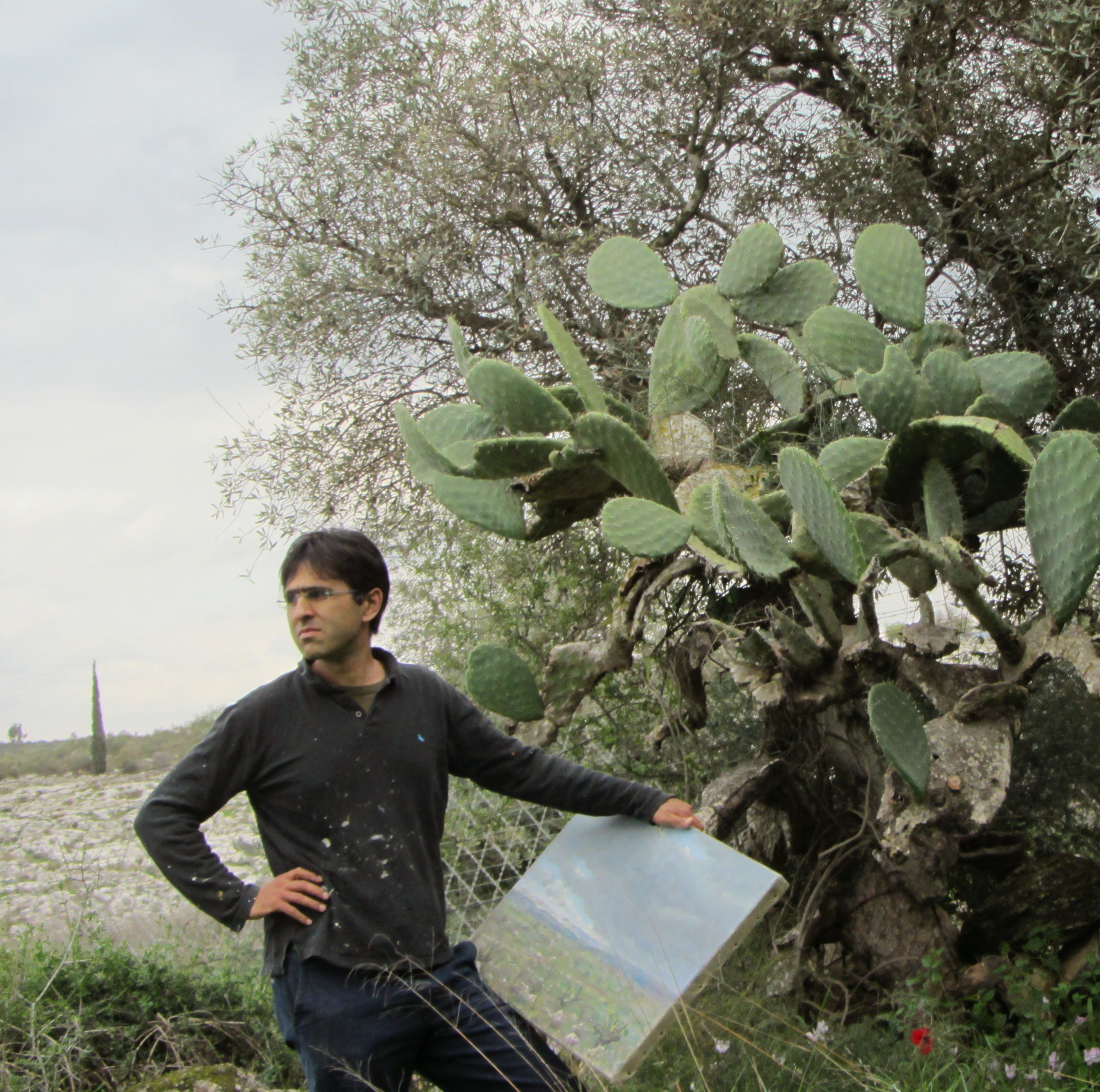
Baruch cactus

Ilan Baruch (Hebrew: אילן ברוך; born 1974) is an Israeli plein air landscape painter.

His "cactus" series, painted over a period of three years, began as "fastidiously rendered... sun-drenched, [and] naturalistic," progressing to images that are "expressive [and] closely cropped."

Invited to create a pair of new "Delft" tiles for the 2014 exhibition Blue-and-White Delftware, Baruch painted one with an olive tree and another with an image of the Dome of the Rock.

== Solo exhibitions ==
- 1992, Nidbach (Layer), Jerusalem
- 2004, The Cactus: Introspections, Helena Rubinstein Pavilion for Contemporary Art, Tel Aviv Museum of Art
- 2005, MonartMuseum
- 2013, "It was never truly a wilderness", at the Ramat Gan Museum of Israeli Art

== Group exhibitions ==
- 1999, Bezalel Academy of Arts and Design
- 2000, Yanko Dada Museum in EinHod, "Introspection Time"
- 2000, "Observation Time"
- 2007, Tel Aviv Museum of Art, New Acquisitions
- 2014, Blue-and-White Delftware, Tel Aviv Museum of Art
