= Leila Farsakh =

Palestinian political economist

- ليلى فرسخ
- Farsakh in 2022
- Born: 1967 (age 58–59); Jordan

Academic background
- Education: University of Cambridge (MPhil, 1990); SOAS, University of London (PhD, 2003)

Leila Farsakh (Arabic: ليلى فرسخ) (born 1967) is a Palestinian political economist who was born in Jordan and is a Professor of Political Science at University of Massachusetts Boston. Her area of expertise is Middle East Politics, Comparative Politics, and the Politics of the Arab-Israeli Conflict. Farsakh holds a MPhil from the University of Cambridge, UK (1990) and a PhD from SOAS University of London (2003).

Farsakh conducted post-doctoral research at Harvard's Center for Middle Eastern Studies, and was a research affiliate at the Center for International Studies at the Massachusetts Institute of Technology.

She has worked with a number of organizations, including the Organisation for Economic Co-operation and Development in Paris (1993 - 1996) and the Palestine Economic Policy Research Institute in Ramallah (1998 - 1999).

In 2001, she won the Peace and Justice Award from the Cambridge Peace Commission in Cambridge, Massachusetts.

Farsakh was member of the editorial Board for the Journal Of Palestine Studies (2008-2020) and was the Project Co-Director for Jerusalem 2050, a problem-solving project jointly sponsored by Massachusetts Institute of Technology's Department of Urban Studies and Planning and the Center for International Studies. She has written extensively on issues related to the Palestinian economy and the Oslo peace process, international migration and regional integration.

Farsakh was also a member of the Board at the non-governmental organization RESIST, founded in 1967 to provide grant money and support to grassroots movements advocating for social change.

== Selected publications ==
=== Books (partial list) ===
- Palestinian Labour Migration to Israel: Labour, Land, and Occupation (2005). Taylor & Francis Ltd, United Kingdom. ISBN 0-415-33356-3.
- Development Strategies, Employment and International Migration, (co-edited with David O’Connor), OECD Development Center Publications, Paris, 1996.
- Palestinian Employment in Israel: 1967-1997 Ramallah, 1998.
- Commemorating the Naksa, Evoking the Nakba, (guest editor), Electronic Journal of Middle Eastern Studies, Spring 2008, MIT, Boston, 2008.
- The Arab and Jewish Questions: Geographies of Engagement in Palestine and Beyond, (co-edited with Bashir Bashir), Columbia University Press, 2020.
- Rethinking Statehood in Palestine: Self-Determination and Decolonization Beyond Partition, University of California Press, 2021.

=== Articles (partial list) ===
- "Under Siege: Closure, Separation and the Palestinian Economy". MERIP. 217. Winter 2000. Archived from the original on 13 April 2001.
- "The Palestinian economy and the Oslo "Peace Process". Trans-Arab Research Institute. 2001.
- "Economic Viability of a Palestinian State in the West Bank and Gaza Strip: Is it Possible without Territorial Integrity and Sovereignty?". MIT Electronic Journal of Middle East Studies. May 2001. Archived from the original on 31 October 2001.
- "Palestinian Labor Flows to Israel: A Finished Story?". Journal of Palestine Studies (125). Autumn 2002. doi:10.1525/jps.2002.32.1.13. Archived from the original on 17 March 2007.
- "Israel: An Apartheid State?". Le Monde diplomatique. November 2003.
- "The Political Economy of Agrarian Change in the West Bank and Gaza Strip" (PDF). Robert Schuman Centre for Advanced Studies, European University Institute. 2004.
- "Independence, Cantons, or Bantustans: Whither the Palestinian State?". Middle East Journal. 59 (2). Spring 2005. doi:10.3751/59.2.13. Archived from the original (PDF) on 13 August 2007.
- "Time for a Bi-National State". Le Monde diplomatique. March 2007. (also published as: "Israel-Palestine: Time for a bi-national state". Electronic Intifada. 20 March 2007.)
- "Statement: One country, one state". Electronic Intifada. 9 July 2007. (co-author)
- "A Legacy of Promise for Muslims". Boston Globe. 11 September 2007. (co-authored with Elora Chowdhury)
- "The Economics of Israeli Occupation: What is Colonial about it?". The Electronic Journal of Middle Eastern Studies. 8. Spring 2008.
- "Introduction – Engaging Islam: Feminisms, Religiosities and Self-Determinations". International Feminist Journal of Politics. 10 (4): 439–454. December 2008. doi:10.1080/14616740802393866. (co-authored with Elora Chowdhury and Rajini Srikanth)
- "The One State Solution and the Israeli-Palestinian Conflict: Palestinian Challenges and Prospects". Middle East Journal. 64 (1): 20–45. Winter 2011. doi:10.3751/65.1.13.
- "Economic Prospects for a One-State Solution in Palestine-Israel". Holy Land Studies. 12 (2): 119–140. 2013. doi:10.3366/hls.2013.0066.
- "Undermining Democracy in Palestine: the Politics of International Aid since Oslo". Journal of Palestine Studies. 45 (4). Summer 2016. doi:10.1525/jps.2016.45.4.48.
- "Knowledge Production, Colonialism and The Palestinian Economy". Journal of Palestine Studies. XLV (2). Winter 2016.
- "A Common State in Israel-Palestine: Historical Origins and Lingering Challenges". Ethnopolitics. 15 (4): 380–392. 2016.
- "The 'Right to Have Rights': Partition and Palestinian Self-Determination". Journal of Palestine Studies. 47 (1): 56–68. November 2017. doi:10.1525/jps.2017.47.1.56.

== Public lectures ==
- "Palestinian Labor Flow to Israel: Is it Over?", at the Center for Middle Eastern Studies at Harvard University, 19 February 2002.
- Palestinian Perspective, Chomsky Lecture on Middle East Crises, December 14, 2000
- Beyond Apartheid in Israel/Palestine: The Reality on the Ground & Lessons from South Africa, at Northeastern University in Boston, 19 November 2006.
- Notes on Analogy: Israel and Apartheid, at the Center for Middle Eastern Studies at Harvard University, 16 March 2007.
