= Israeli checkpoint =

Barrier used by the Israeli security forces

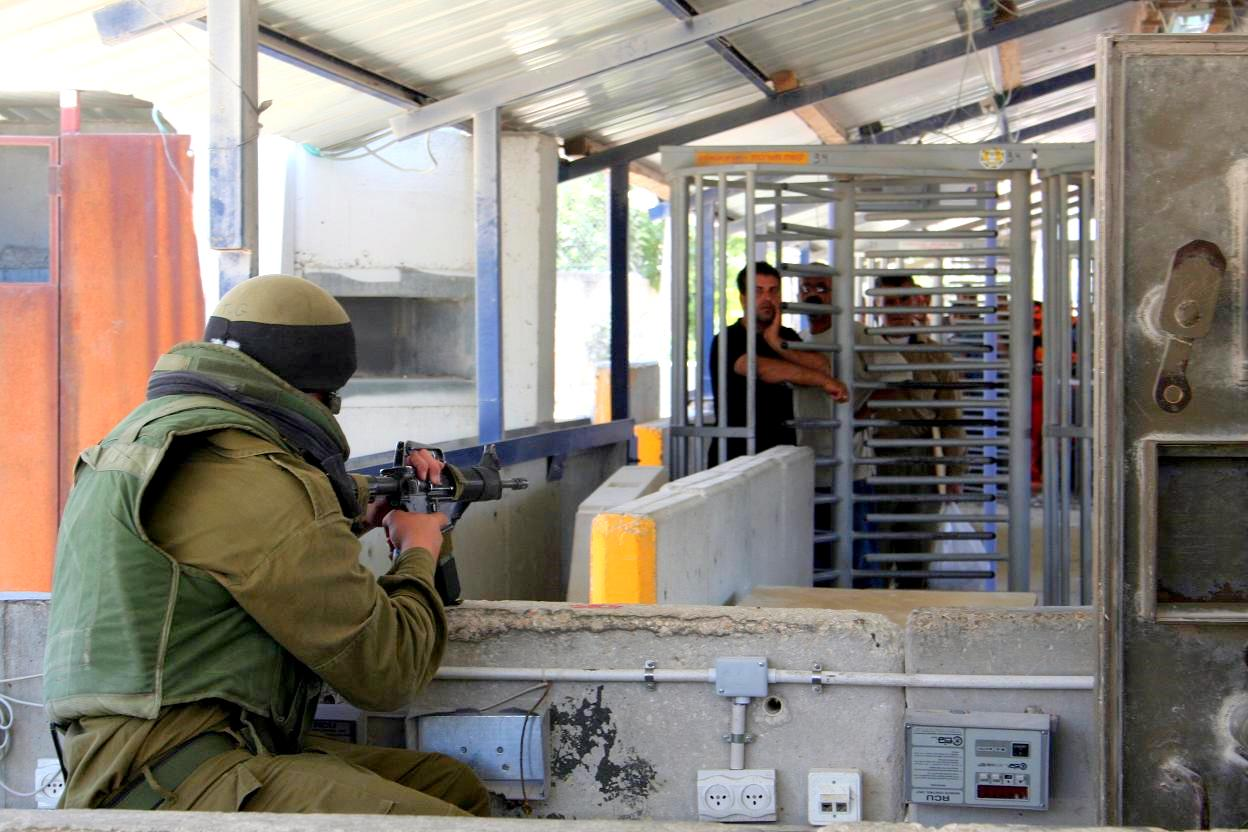
Israeli soldier faces Palestinians waiting at the Huwara checkpoint, at the entrance to Nablus, in the occupied West Bank, 12 June 2006.

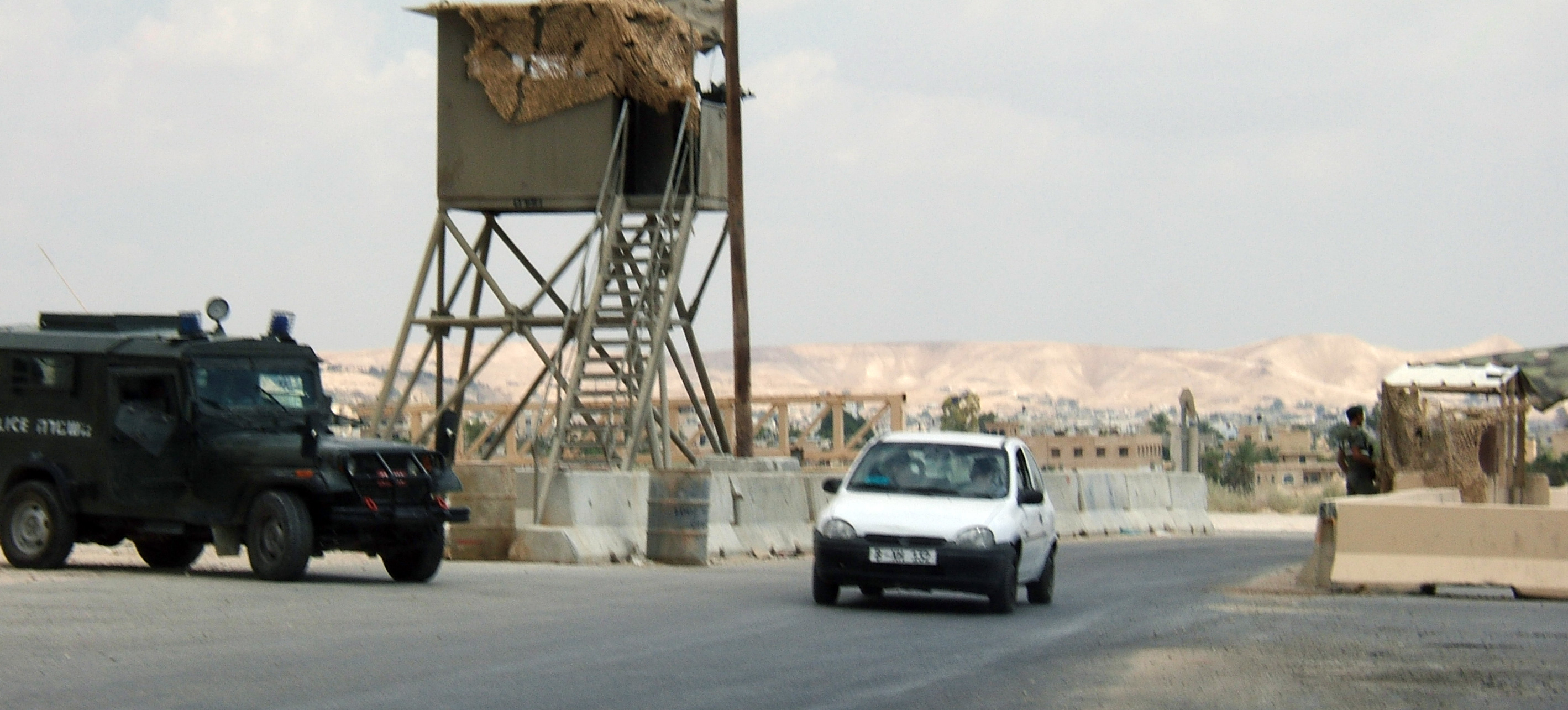
An Israel Border Police checkpoint at Jericho's southern entrance, 2005

An Israeli checkpoint (Hebrew: מחסום, romanized: makhsóm; Arabic: حاجز, romanized: ḥājiz) is a barrier erected by the Israeli security forces, primarily today part of the system of West Bank closures in the Israeli-occupied West Bank. The checkpoints are, according to Israel, intended to enhance security of Israel and Israeli settlements. Israeli checkpoints may be staffed by the Israeli Military Police, the Israel Border Police, or other soldiers.

== Number of checkpoints ==
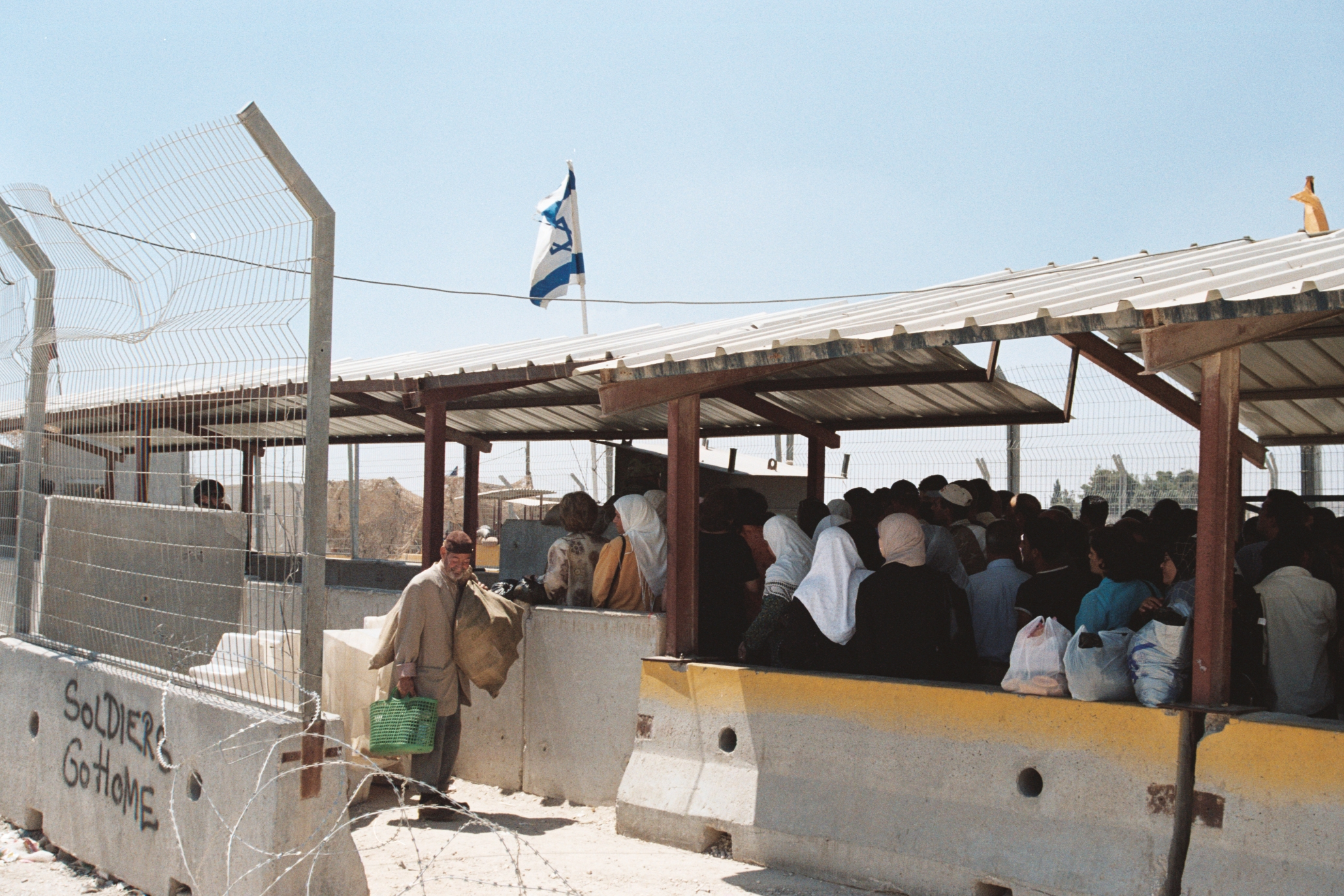
Israeli checkpoint outside the Palestinian city of Ramallah. August 2004

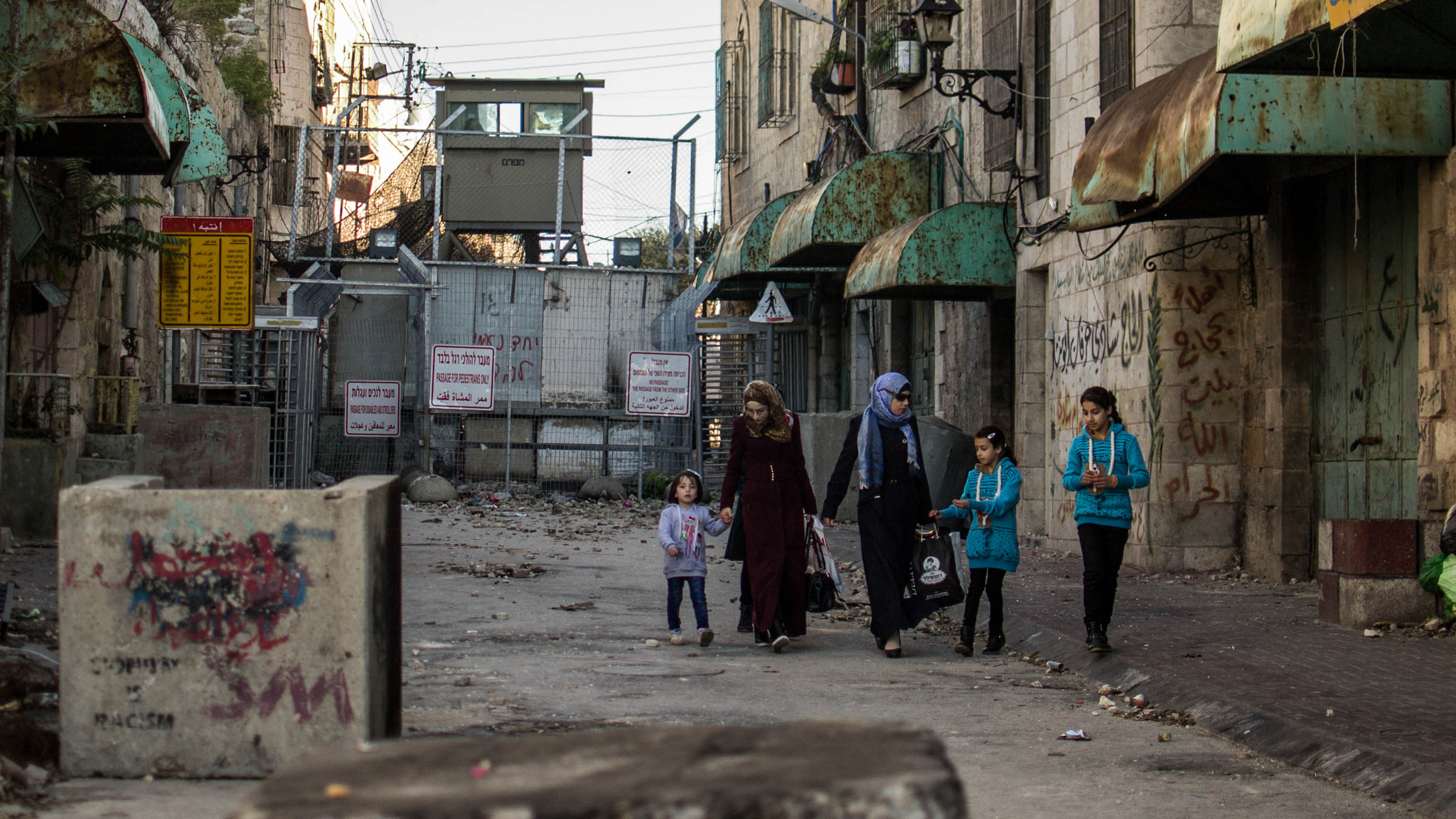
Al-Shuhada Street, Palestinian side of Tarpat Israeli checkpoint in Hebron, in the occupied West Bank, Nov 2015

Since the 1990s, Israel has created hundreds of permanent roadblocks and checkpoints staffed by Israeli Military or border police.

In September 2011, the United Nations Office for the Coordination of Humanitarian Affairs (OCHA) said there were 522 roadblocks and checkpoints obstructing Palestinian movement in the West Bank, up from 503 in July 2010. That number does not include the temporary checkpoints known as "flying checkpoints," of which there were 495 on average per month in the West Bank in 2011, up from 351 on average per month in the previous two years.

According to B'Tselem, there were 99 fixed checkpoints in the West Bank in September 2013, in addition to the 174 surprise flying checkpoints. In August 2013, 288 flying checkpoints were counted.

However, according to the Israel Defense Forces, after withdrawing the majority of checkpoints as a goodwill gesture, in May 2013 there were 13 checkpoints in the West Bank, down from 40 in 2008. Furthermore, according to the IDF, these checkpoints are not always used, with the frequency of use depending on the perceived security threat. This figure does not include the numerous road blocks that prevent Palestinians from crossing the barrier, which in many cases blocks access to areas within the West Bank.

== Criticism ==
Map of West Bank checkpoints in 2025

Many Palestinian residents of the West Bank claim that despite the checkpoints' intended use, in practice they violate Palestinians' rights to transportation and other human rights. Palestinian complaints of abuse and humiliation are common: Israel Defense Forces' Judge Advocate General, Maj. Gen. Dr. Menachem Finkelstein, states that "there were many—too many—complaints that soldiers manning checkpoints abuse and humiliate Palestinians and that the large number of complaints 'lit a red light' for him". Hundreds of Israeli women have monitored the checkpoints as part of Machsom (Checkpoint) Watch. The organization circulated daily reports on the checkpoints and published a book of testimonies that co-founder and author Yehudit Kirstein-Keshet says demonstrates "Israel's imprisonment of an entire population in a web of closures and checkpoints." Kirstein-Keshet also reports, "We Watchers … have witnessed the daily humiliation and abuse, the despair and impotence of Palestinians at checkpoints."

The United Nations, in its February 2009 Humanitarian Monitor report, has stated that it is becoming "apparent" that the checkpoint and obstacles, which Israeli authorities justified from the beginning of the second Intifada (September 2000) as a temporary military response to violent confrontations and attacks on Israeli civilians, is evolving into "a more permanent system of control" that is steadily reducing the space available for Palestinian growth and movement for the benefit of the increasing Israeli settler population.

== Checkpoints and medical care ==
In March 2002, an explosive device was found in a Palestine Red Crescent Society (PRCS) ambulance. The Red Crescent expressed shock at the incident, and began an internal investigation. On January 11, 2004, a PRCS ambulance not carrying patients was stopped and searched at a flying checkpoint near the village of Jit. The ambulance was escorted by military jeep to the Qadomin bus station where after 10 minutes the ambulance crew got their IDs back and were allowed to continue working. In another case, on the same day, an ambulance transporting a diabetic patient to the hospital in Tulkarm was stopped, searched, and allowed to proceed after the companion of the patient was arrested.

In 2008, an Israeli soldier in command of a checkpoint outside Nablus was discharged and imprisoned for two weeks after he refused to allow a Palestinian woman in labour to pass through. The woman was forced to give birth at the check point and the baby was stillborn. Between 2000 and 2006 at least 68 women gave birth at checkpoints of whom 35 miscarried and five died in childbirth, according to the Palestinian health ministry.

== See also ==
- West Bank closures
- Machsom Watch a human rights group of Israeli women monitoring IDF checkpoints.
- Palestinian freedom of movement
