= West Bank closures =

Restraints on Palestinian freedom of movement by Israel

The West Bank closures are a system of obstacles, including permanent and partially staffed checkpoints, concrete roadblocks and barriers, metal gates, earth mounds, tunnels, trenches, and an elaborate set of permit restrictions that controls and restricts Palestinian freedom of movement.

Severe closures began following the outbreak of the First intifada in the late 1980s, when travel restrictions were tightened in the West Bank and Gaza Strip, and Israel began requiring Gazan workers to hold permits workers from Gaza.

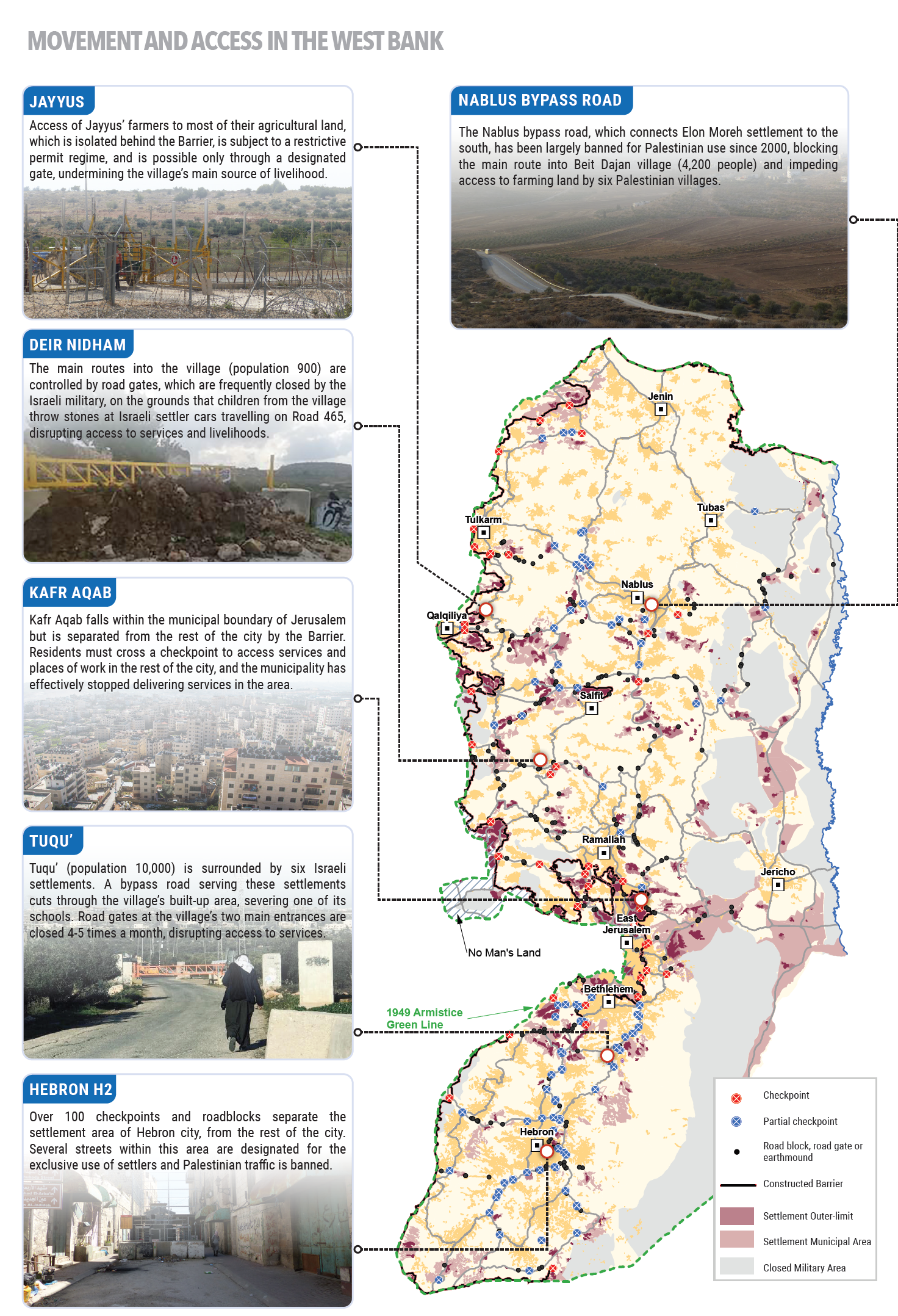
Longstanding access restrictions for West Bank Palestinians

== Rationale and impact ==
The Israeli government states that the system is designed to protect Israeli citizens from Palestinian terrorist attacks that have killed over 1,000 Israelis since September 2000. In addition to the partial fulfilment of these goals, the closure system has divided communities from their land and one another and restricted Palestinian access to health and education services, their places of work and sites of religious worship.

== Physical makeup ==
The number of checkpoints and physical obstacles and their uses and locations varies. While some are located so as to restrict Palestinian access to Israeli areas, most of them "do not restrict the interaction between Israelis and Palestinians, but rather between Palestinians and Palestinians". Organizations like the United Nations Office for the Coordination of Humanitarian Affairs, who track such developments have reported a recent upward trend; increasing from 376 in August 2005 to 528, as of September 2006. Of these, 83 checkpoints were in use by IDF and/or Border Police and another were 445 unoccupied checkpoints and obstacles.

=== Checkpoints ===
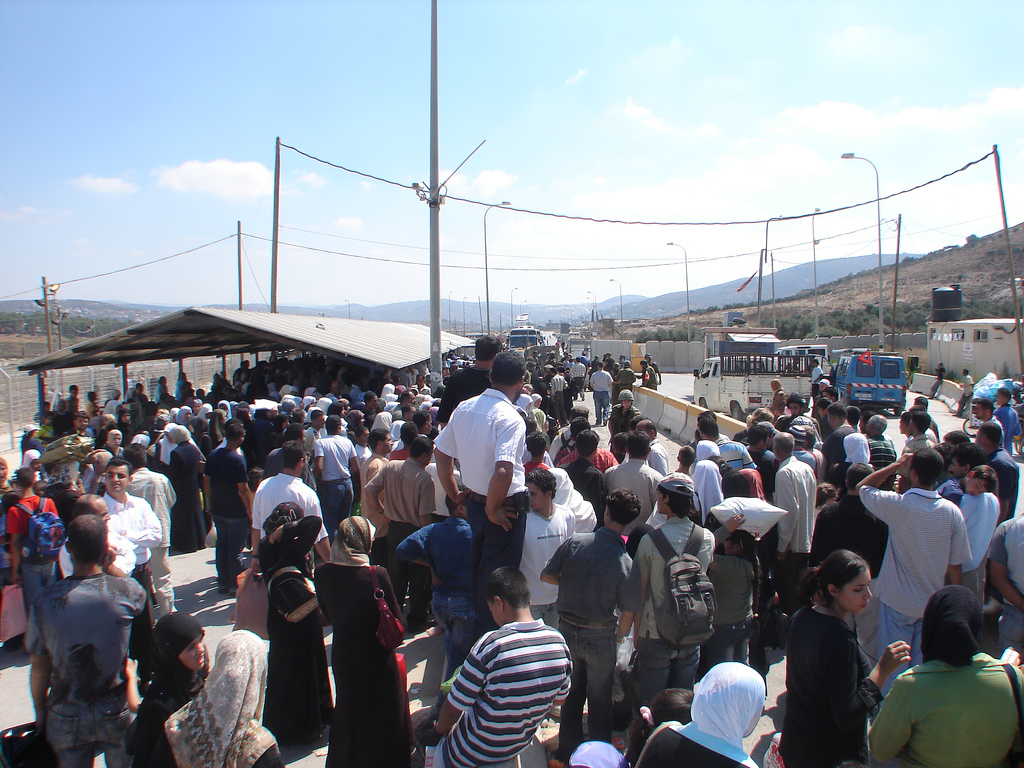
Huwwara, one of the nine permanent checkpoints in the Nablus region.

Staffed checkpoints usually consist of a barrier with observation towers and other physical blocks used to control pedestrian and vehicular access.

There are flying checkpoints which are unannounced spot-checks spontaneously erected for a period of time, often on key transportation routes at peak travelling times. In July, August and September 2006, flying checkpoints were used an average of 165 times per week.

=== Observation towers ===
These are elevated military towers to monitor/control Palestinian pedestrian and vehicular access.

=== Anti-vehicle barriers ===
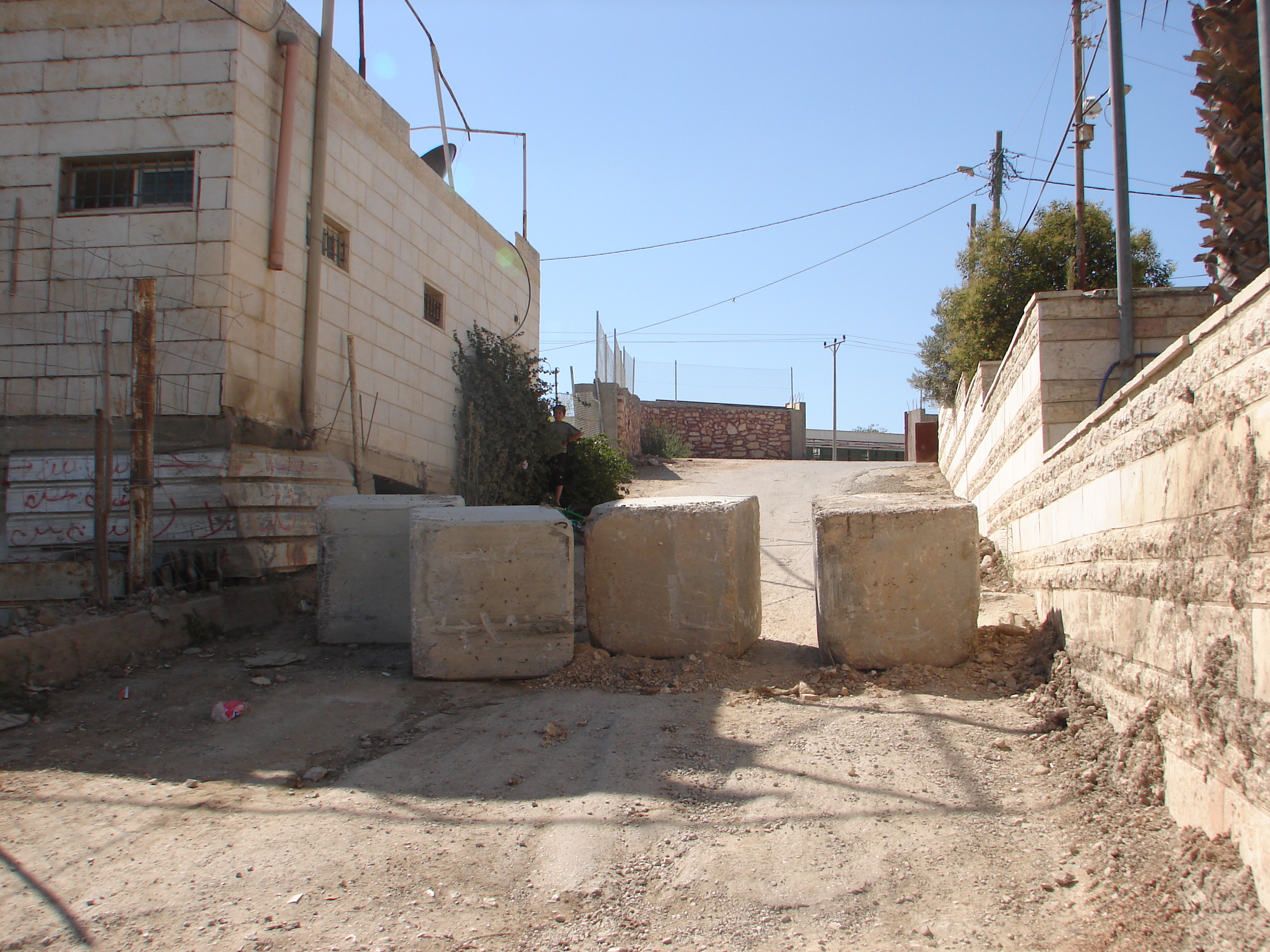
A road block at one of the entrances to Beit Ummar village

A series of concrete blocks, iron gates, deep trenches, and earth mounds (large mounds of dirt and rocks dumped by military bulldozers) are utilized by the Israeli military to restrict Palestinian vehicular access to primary highway networks, route traffic toward staffed checkpoints, and prevent vehicles from bypassing closures. Monitored by the United Nations Office for the Coordination of Humanitarian Affairs (UN-OCHA), the quantity of these unstaffed physical barriers fluctuated heavily due to military operations, shifting from hundreds of roadblocks to over 600 total internal obstacles across the West Bank by 2008.

By 2026, the movement and access framework had substantially expanded and shifted from temporary earthen obstructions toward fixed infrastructure. According to an April 2026 report by UN-OCHA, the total number of documented physical movement obstacles in the West Bank reached 925, representing a 43% increase over the preceding 20-year average of 647 obstacles. The modern breakdown of anti-vehicle and transit barriers features structural components designed to restrict regional vehicle movement, including 89 permanently staffed checkpoints, 218 intermittently staffed partial checkpoints, 232 permanent heavy iron road gates, 114 linear closures (such as trenches, earth walls, and road barriers), and 272 standalone roadblocks or earth mounds.

UN-OCHA noted that while ad-hoc obstructions like earth mounds and concrete blocks accounted for roughly 73% of total obstacles in the early 2000s, fortified checkpoints and iron gates comprise nearly 60% of the movement restriction framework by 2026, indicating an institutionalized entrenchment of the access system. Approximately half of all active closures (459 obstacles) are positioned to completely block or restrict vehicles trying to access primary regional routes from local Palestinian towns, with 121 obstacles specifically blocking connecting traffic onto Road 60, the primary north–south transportation artery of the West Bank.

=== Road barriers ===
Secures the passage of Israeli settlers on restricted roads. These fences impede Palestinians from traveling over major roads leading to the main cities. There are 25 of these in the West Bank totalling 37,600 metres.

=== Permit system ===
The permit system is complex and applied differently from region to region. A permit eases travel and reduces the risk of being turned back at a checkpoint. Permits are necessary for crossing specific checkpoints, accessing the Jordan Valley, the 'closed area' between the Green Line and the Israeli West Bank Barrier and for entering East Jerusalem.

=== Barrier gates ===
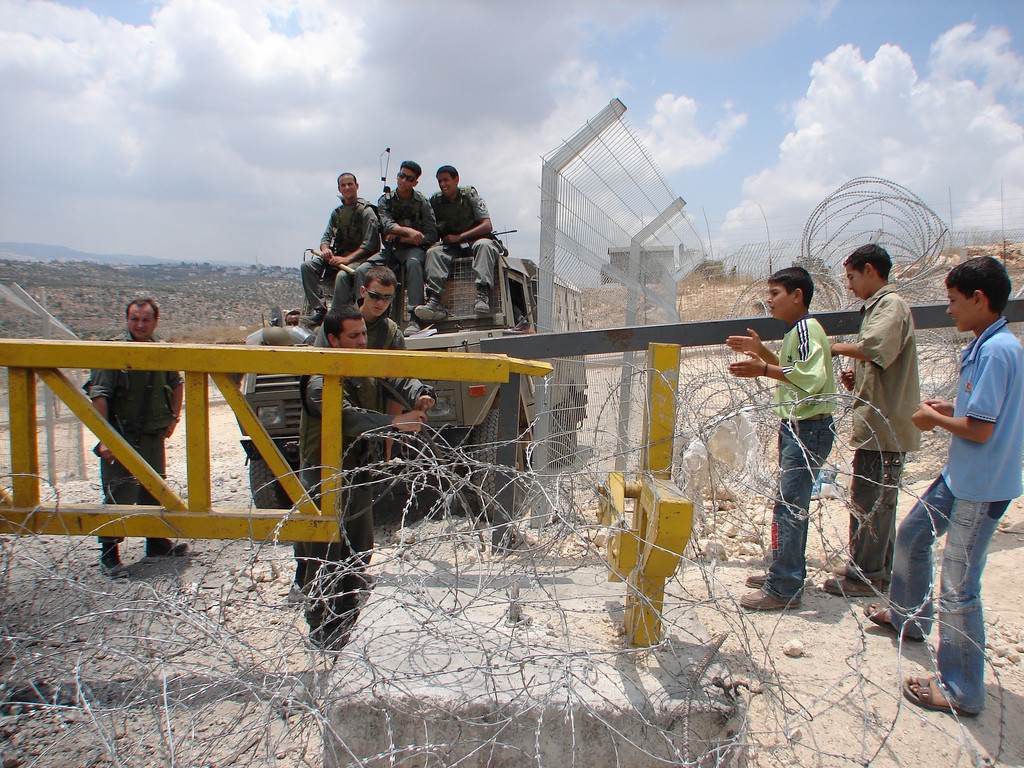
A barrier gate at Bil'in.

Allows restricted movement through the West Bank barrier to Palestinian lands and to Israel. Permits are required for Palestinians to pass through a gate. Thirty-eight of the seventy-three Barrier gates are open to Palestinians with appropriate permits.

== See also ==
- Seam Zone
- West Bank Division
- Israel Border Police
