= State derivation =

State derivation has been understood since the 1970s as an attempt within Marxism and neo-Marxism to explain the emergence and extent of the state and its law within the bourgeois, modern economic system and therewith to derive the relationship between economics and politics from the structure of capitalist production.

In the 1920s, the legal scholar Evgeny Pashukanis foreshadowed the debate with his explanation of the legal form of commodities. In the 1970s Western Marxism resumed the state derivation debate dominated by the works of Gramsci, Althusser and Poulantzas. In West Germany, however, as a result of the student movement’s political expectations of the first post-war social democratic-led government of Willy Brandt, an exclusive debate occurred, the Staatsableitungsdebatte.

== The West-German state derivation Debate ==
The debate was considered a branch of New Marx Reading and took place primarily among academicians, but also arose from the national political situation. After the electoral victory in 1969 of a social-liberal coalition in Germany, many on the left hoped for social reforms and sought a revision of institutions and a reform of society by means of the state.

Important writers in this area since 1970 are Rudolf Wolfgang Müller, Christel Neusüß, Bernhard Blanke, Elmar Altvater, Freerk Huisken, Joachim Hirsch, the Class Analysis Project (including Joachim Bischoff) and the Marxist Group.

Within the state-derivation debate the state is seen as a "structural component of the capitalist relations of production itself, its specific political form. The capitalist classes and relations of exploitation are set up so that the economically ruling class do not rule directly but their rule can only be realized by means of a body that is relatively separate, the state. At the same time, the structural and functional logic of capitalism remains in control. The state does not stand outside and independent of capital. The bourgeois state is therefore a class-state without being the direct instrument of a class. And this particularization or relative autonomy of the state is the basis of the state illusion".

Given the lack of its social efficacy, the Staatsableitungsdebatte ceased to have an explanatory quality of its own to the end the 1970s when the majority of the German New Left except the Marxist Group either joined the emerging Green Party or entirely withdrew from the political arena.

=== Criticism ===
Rainer-Olaf Schultze has argued that the derivative-debate remains "mostly in the conceptual logical domain of the interpretation of the Marxist classics" and failed "to deliver the necessary mediation for the concrete analysis of the reality of capitalist states".

Similarly, Frank Deppe suggests that the state-derivation debate 'was a typical example of a - largely detached from practice and finally only self-reflexive - "academic Marxism", especially focusing on the state - given the importance of civil society in the sense of Gramsci - involves a narrowing of the political concept".

Also, Joachim Hirsch, at that time decisively involved in the debate, conceded later, "that the state derivation debate was conducted on a highly abstract level and sometimes the direction became a form of theoretical tiddly winks". On the other hand, according to Hirsch, however, in many cases the status of the debate has been misunderstood, in which it had not been developed into a complete state theorie.

== See also ==
- Marx's theory of the state
- Miliband–Poulantzas debate
- State monopoly capitalism
- Ideology and Ideological State Apparatuses

== Literature ==
- John Holloway, Sol Picciotto, State and Capital: A Marxist Debate (1978), ISBN 0-7131-5987-1.
- Clyde W. Barrow, Critical Theories of the State: Marxist, Neomarxist, Postmarxist, 1993, ISBN 978-0299137144.
- Elmar Altvater and Jürgen Hoffmann, The West German State Derivation Debate: The Relation between Economy and Politics as a Problem of Marxist State Theory, in: Duke University Press (editor), Social Text No. 24 (1990), pp. 134-155.
- Elmar Altvater, Some problems of state interventionism. Kapitalistate 1973, 1, 96—116; 2, 76—S3.
- Nicos Poulantzas, Martin James, The Poulantzas Reader: Marxism, Law and the State ISBN 978-1844672004.
- Margaret Wirth, Towards a critique of the theory of state monopoly capitalism, in Economy and Society, 3 (1977), pp. 284-313.
- David A. Gold, Y.H. Lo, Erik Olin Wright, Recent developments in Marxist theories of the capitalist state. Monthly Review 1975, vol. 27, nos. 5 & 6.
- Bob Jessop The Capitalist State: Marxist Theories and Methods, 1982, ISBN 978-0631142188.
- Karl Held, The Democratic State: Critique of Bourgeois Sovereignty, 1993, ISBN 9783929211016.
- Wolfgang Müller, Christel Neusüß: The illusions of state socialism and the contradiction between wage-labour and capital. Telos 1975, vol. 25.
- Burkhard Tuschling, Rechtsform und Produktionsverhältnisse. Zur materialistischen Theorie des Rechtsstaates, 1976, ISBN 3434200983.
- Sybille von Flatow, Freerk Huisken: Zum Problem der Ableitung des bürgerlichen Staates] (PDF-Datei; 5,46 MB), In: PROKLA Nr. 7, 1973.
- Bernhard Blanke, Ulrich Jürgens, Hans Kastendiek: Zur neueren marxistischen Diskussion über die Analyse von Form und Funktion des bürgerlichen Staates, In: PROKLA 14/15, 1974.
- Projekt Klassenanalyse (1974): Oberfläche und Staat: Kritik neuerer Staatsableitungen (Altvater, Braunmühl u.a., Flatow/Huisken, Läpple, Marxistische Gruppe Erlangen). VSA, Westberlin.
