= Marxist Group =

Marxist Group may refer to:

- Marxist Group (Germany) (Ger.: Marxistische Gruppe), a West German communist organization active in the 1970s and 1980s
- Marxist Group (UK), an early Trotskyist group in the United Kingdom
- International Marxist Group, a Trotskyist political party in Britain between 1964 and 1987
- International Marxist Group (Germany), a Trotskyist group in West Germany
- Revolutionary Marxist Group (Canada), a Trotskyist political organization in Canada in the 1970s
- Revolutionary Marxist Group (Ireland), a Trotskyist organization in Ireland during the 1970s
