= Democratic road to socialism =

Socialism associated with Nicos Poulantzas

The democratic road to socialism is a political philosophy within structural Marxism and democratic socialism which emphasizes a mixture of parliamentary and social movement-based strategies in order to achieve fundamental transformations to the structures of the state and civil society.

== Definition ==
The term was coined by Nicos Poulantzas,^{:74-8} who defined it in analyzing the nature of the capitalist state. Though he believed liberal democracies have an inherent tendency to "reproduce the capitalist state regime" despite socialist electoral victories,^{:23} he interpreted political liberties as "the result of popular struggles" which exploited the state's contradictions.^{:24} In this view, both reformist and revolutionary socialist perspectives were insufficient. To reformists: Occupying office does not imply a transformation of the state, and thus many socialist parties merely manage capitalism rather than enable permanent political transformations. To revolutionaries: "smashing" the state implies a loss of conquests of popular struggle (i.e., political liberties), and creating a Leninist or centralist alternative reproduces class domination over the popular power it claims to unleash.

He therefore advocates not for merely prioritizing entry into state institutions (whether by election or revolution) but for "the development of popular movements, the mushrooming of democratic organs at the base, and the rise of centres of self-management," including popular assemblies, labor unions, and workers' councils, which would then enable a radical transformation of the structure of the state itself.^{:24}

However, the democratic road to socialism maintains that institutions of representative democracy are "an essential condition of democratic socialism" which can regulate these decentralized models in order for the working class to collectively wield the political power and technical expertise necessary to direct a complex socialist society. Under the democratic road to socialism, entry to state institutions remains necessary to press on the state's internal contradictions toward transformation, with aid from external organizing.

The seizure of state power depends on a long-term strategy of modifying the relation of forces on state terrain itself, pressing on its internal contradictions. But contrary to what certain currents in the Eurocommunist parties accept, we must not forget that the state ... cannot be radically modified by merely shifting the relation of forces.

— Nicos Poulantzas, "The State, Social Movements, Party," Dialectiques, Fall 1979

== Application ==
Some academics, activists, and political commentators retroactively apply the term democratic road to socialism to The Chilean Way to Socialism and the Presidency of Salvador Allende. While Allende and the moderate factions of Popular Unity and the Socialist Party of Chile he reflected never adopted the term, the Allende administration likewise shared a commitment to Marxism, representative democracy, a gradual transition to socialism, and broader social movement politics that rejected the possibility of achieving socialism by merely taking office, in favor of fundamental transformations to state and civil societal structures.

Today, the democratic road to socialism is espoused by certain socialist politicians, such as former Bolivian Vice President Álvaro García Linera,^{:xii} and groups, such as the Bread and Roses caucus of the Democratic Socialists of America. The democratic road to socialism has influenced the development of Eurocommunism and the ideological trajectory of parties such as Syriza.

Tristram Hunt and Bruno Jossa argue that Karl Marx and Friedrich Engels grew skeptical of "top-down revolutions" in their later writings, in favor of "a peaceful, democratic road to socialism."

== Differences with other socialist perspectives ==
The democratic road to socialism is distinguished from evolutionary socialism to its right, as espoused by Eduard Bernstein, which advocates for incremental reform by primarily parliamentary means within liberal democracy, with the goal of ultimately achieving socialism through the state. Yet, it is also distinguished from revolutionary socialism to its left, which views capitalism as only able to be completely overthrown by non-reformist means, and does not see a transformative "capture" of the liberal state as a viable means to reach a socialist democracy. The democratic road to socialism further differs from libertarian socialism in its strong support for representative institutions and state transformation, and from Leninism in its rejection of vanguardism and "smashing" the old state machinery to construct a new one.

== See also ==
- Democratic socialism
- Democracy in Marxism
- Eurocommunism
- Italian road to socialism
- Libertarian socialism
- Reformist socialism
- Revolutionary socialism
- Social democracy
- Structural Marxism
- Trotskyism
