= Ideology of the Communist Party of the Soviet Union =

Manifestation of Marxism–Leninism

Before the perestroika reforms of Mikhail Gorbachev that promoted a more liberal form of socialism, the formal ideology of the Communist Party of the Soviet Union (CPSU) was Marxism–Leninism, a form of socialism consisting of a centralised command economy with a vanguardist one-party state that aimed to realize the dictatorship of the proletariat. The Soviet Union's ideological commitment to achieving communism included the national communist development of socialism in one country and peaceful coexistence with capitalist countries while engaging in anti-imperialism to defend the international proletariat, combat the predominant prevailing global system of capitalism and promote the goals of Bolshevism. The state ideology of the Soviet Union – and thus Marxism–Leninism – derived and developed from the theories, policies, and political praxis of Karl Marx, Friedrich Engels, Vladimir Lenin, and Joseph Stalin.

== Marxism–Leninism ==
Marxism–Leninism was the ideological basis for the Soviet Union. It explained and legitimized the CPSU's right to rule, while explaining its role as a vanguard party. For instance, the ideology explained that the CPSU's policies, even if they were unpopular, were correct because the party was enlightened. It was represented to be the only truth in Soviet society, and with it rejected the notion of multiple truths. In short, it was used to justify CPSU Leninism as being a means to an end. The relationship between ideology and decision-making was at best ambivalent, with most policy decisions taken in the light of the continued, permanent development of Marxism–Leninism, which, as the only truth, could not by its very nature become outdated.

Despite having evolved over the years, Marxism–Leninism had several central tenets. The main tenet was the party's status as sole ruling party. The 1977 Constitution referred to the party as the "leading and guiding force of Soviet society, and the nucleus of its political system, of all state and public organizations, is the Communist Party of the Soviet Union." State socialism was essential, and from Joseph Stalin until Mikhail Gorbachev official discourse considered private social and economic activity such as capitalism as "retarding" the development of Russian collective consciousness and of the Soviet economy. Gorbachev supported privatization to a degree, but based his policies on Vladimir Lenin's and Nikolai Bukharin's view on the New Economic Policy of the 1920s, and supported complete state ownership over the commanding heights of the economy. Unlike liberalism, Marxism–Leninism stressed not the importance of the individual, but rather the role of the individual as a member of a collective. Thus defined, individuals had only the right to freedom of expression if it safeguarded the interests of the collective. For instance, in the 1977 Constitution Marxism–Leninism it was stated that every person had the right to express their opinion, but that opinion could only be expressed if it was in accordance with the "general interests of Soviet society." In short, the number of rights granted to an individual was decided by the state, and could be taken away by the state as it saw fit.

Soviet Marxism–Leninism justified nationalism, and the media portrayed every victory of the Soviet Union as a victory for the communist movement as a whole. In large parts, Soviet nationalism was based upon ethnic Russian nationalism. Marxism–Leninism stressed the importance of the worldwide conflict between capitalism and socialism, and the Soviet press talked about progressive and reactionary forces, while claiming that socialism was on the verge of victory; that the "correlations of forces" were in the Soviet Union's favour. Until its late years of the USSR, the ideology had professed state atheism, and party members were formerly not allowed to be religious. The state professed a belief in the feasibility of total communist mode of production, and all policies were seen as justifiable if it contributed to the Soviet Union's reaching that stage.

=== Leninism ===
In Marxist philosophy, Leninism is the body of political theory for the democratic organisation of a revolutionary vanguard party, and the achievement of a dictatorship of the proletariat, as political prelude to the establishment of the socialist mode of production, developed by Lenin. Since Karl Marx barely, if ever wrote about how the socialist mode of production would look like or function, these tasks were left for later scholars like Lenin to solve. His main contribution to Marxist thought is the concept of the vanguard party of the working class. The vanguard party was conceived to be a highly-knit centralised organization which was led by intellectuals, rather than by the working class itself. The party was open only to a small number of the workers, the reason being that the workers in Russia still had not developed class consciousness and therefore needed to be educated to reach such a state. Lenin believed that the vanguard party could initiate policies in the name of the working class even if the working class did not support them, since the vanguard party would know what was best for the workers, since the party functionaries had attained consciousness.

Lenin, in light of the Marx's theory of the state (which views the state as an oppressive organ of the ruling class), had no qualms of forcing change upon the country. He viewed the dictatorship of the proletariat, in contrast to the dictatorship of the bourgeoisie, as the dictatorship of the majority. The repressive powers of the state were to be used to transform the country, and to strip of the former ruling class of their wealth. Lenin believed that the transition from the capitalist mode of production to the socialist mode of production would last for a long period. According to some authors, Leninism was by definition authoritarian. In contrast to Karl Marx, who believed that the socialist revolution would be composed of and led by the working class alone, Lenin argued that a socialist revolution did not necessarily need to be led by or composed of the working class alone, instead contending that a revolution needed to be led by the oppressed classes of society, which in the case of Russia was the peasant class.

=== Stalinism ===
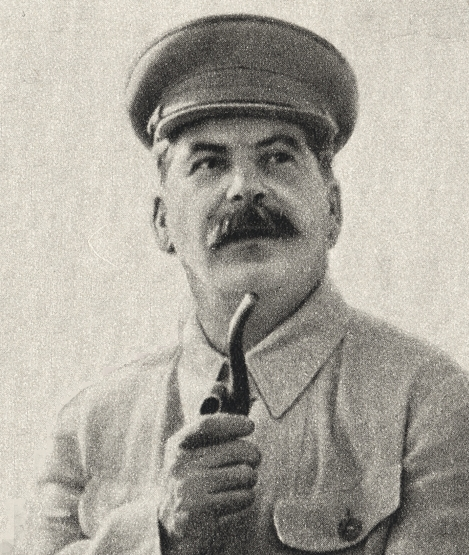
While not an ideology per se, Stalinism refers to the thoughts and policies of Stalin

Stalinism, while not an ideology per se, refers to Stalin's thoughts and policies. Stalin's introduction of the concept "Socialism in One Country" in 1924 was a major turning point in Soviet ideological discourse. The Soviet Union did not need a socialist world revolution to construct a socialist society, Stalin claimed. Four years later, Stalin initiated his "Second Revolution" with the introduction of state socialism and central planning. In the early-1930s, he initiated collectivization of Soviet agriculture, by de-privatizing agriculture, but not turning it under the responsibility of the state, per se, instead creating peasant cooperatives. With the initiation of his "Second Revolution", Stalin launched a "Cult of Lenin" and a cult of personality centered upon himself. For instance, the name of the city of Petrograd was changed to Leningrad, the town of Lenin's birth was renamed Ulyanov (Lenin's birth-name), the Order of Lenin became the highest state award and portraits of Lenin were hung up everywhere; in public squares, factories and offices etc. The increasing bureaucracy which followed after the introduction of a state socialist economy was at complete odds with the Marxist notion of "the withering away of the state". Stalin tried to explain the reasoning behind it at the 16th Congress (held in 1930);

We stand for the strengthening of the dictatorship of the proletariat, which represents the mightiest and most powerful authority of all forms of State that have ever existed. The highest development of the State power for the withering away of State power —this is the Marxian formula. Is this "contradictory"? Yes, it is "contradictory." But this contradiction springs from life itself and reflects completely Marxist dialectic.

The idea that the state would wither away was later abandoned by Stalin at the 18th Congress (held in 1939), in which he expressed confidence that the state would exist, even if the Soviet Union reached communism, as long as it was encircled by capitalism. Two key concepts were created in the latter half of his rule; the "two camp" theory and that of "capitalist encirclement". The threat of capitalism was used to strengthen Stalin's personal powers, and Soviet propaganda began making a direct link with Stalin and stability in society, claiming that the country would crumble without the leader. Stalin deviated greatly from classical Marxism when it came to "subjective factors", claiming that party members, whatever rank, had to profess fanatic adherence to the party's line and ideology, and that otherwise those policies would fail.

=== De-Stalinization ===
After Stalin died and once the ensuing power struggle subsided, a period of de-Stalinization developed, as Soviets debated what Marxism–Leninism would be in the absence of its de facto enforced equivalence with Stalinism. During the Khrushchev Thaw, the answer that emerged was that it would continue to involve central planning to the nearly complete exclusion of market mechanisms, as well as the totalitarian version of collectivism and continuing xenophobia, but that it would no longer involve the extreme degree of state terror seen during the Great Purge era. This ideological viewpoint maintained the secular apotheosis of Lenin, treating the terror aspect of Stalinism as a perversion that had been belatedly corrected, rather than admitting that Lenin himself had built a legacy of state terror. This storyline persisted into the Gorbachev era and even mostly survived glasnost. As Soviet military officer and Lenin biographer Dmitri Volkogonov described it, "Lenin was the last bastion to fall."

== Concepts ==
=== Dictatorship of the proletariat ===
Either the dictatorship of the landowners and capitalists, or the dictatorship of the proletariat [...] There is no middle course [...] There is no middle course anywhere in the world, nor can there be.

— Lenin, claiming that people had only two choices; a choice between two different, but distinct class dictatorships.

Lenin, according to his interpretation of Marx's theory of the state, believed democracy to be unattainable anywhere in the world before the proletariat seized power. According to Marxist theory, the state is a vehicle for oppression and is headed by a ruling class, an "organ of class rule". He believed that by his time, the only viable solution was dictatorship since the war was heading into a final conflict between the "progressive forces of socialism and the degenerate forces of capitalism". The Russian Revolution of 1917 was already a failure according to its original aim, which was to act as an inspiration for a world revolution. As a result, the initial anti-statist posture and the active campaigning for direct democracy was replaced with dictatorship. From the perspective of the Bolsheviks, the rationale for this change was Russia's lack of development, its status as the sole socialist state in the world, its encirclement by imperialist powers, and its internal encirclement by the peasantry.

Marx, similar to Lenin, considered it fundamentally irrelevant whether a bourgeois state was ruled according to a republican, parliamentarian or constitutionally monarchic political system because this did not change the mode of production itself. These systems, regardless of whether they are ruled by an oligarchy or by mass participation, were ultimately all a dictatorship of the bourgeoisie by definition because the bourgeoisie, by the very condition of their class and its interests, would promote and implement policies in their class interests and thus in defense of capitalism. There was a difference, though; Lenin, after the failures of the world revolutions, argued that this did not necessarily have to change under the dictatorship of the proletariat. The reasoning came from wholly practical considerations: the majority of the country's inhabitants were not communists and the party could not introduce parliamentary democracy since that was inconsistent with their ideology and would lead to the party losing power. He therefore concluded that "[t]he form of government has absolutely nothing to do with" the nature of the dictatorship of the proletariat. Bukharin and Trotsky agreed with Lenin, both claiming that the revolution had only destroyed the old, but failing completely in creating anything sort of new. Lenin had now concluded that the dictatorship of the proletariat would not alter the relationship of power between persons, but rather "transform their productive relations so that, in the long run, the realm of necessity could be overcome and, with that, genuine social freedom realised".

It was in the period of 1920–1921 that Soviet leaders and ideologists began differentiating between socialism and communism; hitherto the two terms had been used to describe similar conditions. From then, the two terms developed separate meanings. According to Soviet ideology, Russia was in the transition from capitalism to communism (referred to interchangeably under Lenin as the dictatorship of the proletariat), socialism being the intermediate stage to communism, with the latter being the final stage which follows after socialism. By now, the party leaders believed that universal mass participation and true democracy could only take form in the last stage, if only because of Russia's current conditions at the time.

[Because] the proletariat is still so divided, so degraded, so corrupted in parts [...] that an organization taking in the whole proletariat cannot directly exercise proletarian dictatorship. It can be exercised only by a vanguard that has absorbed the revolutionary energy of the class.

— Lenin, explaining the increasingly dictatorial nature of the regime.

In early Bolshevik discourse, the term "dictatorship of the proletariat" was of little significance; the few times it was mentioned, it was likened to the form of government which had existed in the Paris Commune. With the ensuing Russian Civil War and the social and material devastation that followed, however, its meaning was transformed from communal democracy to disciplined totalitarian rule. By now, Lenin had concluded that only a proletarian regime as oppressive as its opponents could survive in this world. The powers previously bestowed upon the soviets were now given to the Council of People's Commissars; the central government was in turn to be governed by "an army of steeled revolutionary Communists [by Communists he referred to the Party]". In a letter to Gavril Myasnikov, Lenin in late 1920 explained his new reinterpretation of the term "dictatorship of the proletariat";

Dictatorship means nothing more nor less than authority untrammelled by any laws, absolutely unrestricted by any rules whatever, and based directly on force. The term 'dictatorship' has no other meaning but this.

Lenin justified these policies by claiming that all states were class states by nature, and that these states were maintained through class struggle. This meant that the dictatorship of the proletariat in the Soviet Union could only be "won and maintained by the use of violence against the bourgeoisie". The main problem with this analysis is that the Party came to view anyone opposing or holding alternate views of the party as bourgeoisie. The worst enemy remained the moderates, however, which were "objectively" considered to be "the real agents of the bourgeoisie in the working class movement, the labour lieutenants of the capitalist class".

Consequently, "bourgeoisie" became synonymous with "opponent" and with people who disagreed with the party in general. These oppressive measures led to another reinterpretation of the dictatorship of the proletariat and socialism in general; it was now defined as a purely economic system. Slogans and theoretical works about democratic mass participation and collective decision-making were now replaced with texts which supported authoritarian management. Considering the situation, the party believed it had to use the same powers as the bourgeoisie to transform Russia, for there was no other alternative. Lenin began arguing that the proletariat, similar to the bourgeoisie, did not have a single preference for a form of government, and because of that dictatorship was acceptable to both the party and the proletariat. In a meeting with party officials, Lenin stated—in line with his economist view of socialism—that "[i]ndustry is indispensable, democracy is not", further arguing that "we do not promise any democracy or any freedom".

=== Anti-imperialism ===
Imperialism is capitalism at a stage of development at which the dominance of monopolies and finance-capital is established; in which the export of capital has acquired pronounced importance; in which the division of the world among the international trusts has begun; in which the divisions of all territories of the globe among the biggest capitalist powers has been completed.

— Lenin, citing the main features of capitalism in the age of imperialism in Imperialism: the Highest Stage of Capitalism.

The Marxist theory on imperialism was conceived by Lenin in his book, Imperialism: the Highest Stage of Capitalism (published in 1917). It was written in response to the theoretical crisis within Marxist thought, which occurred due to capitalism's recovery in the 19th century. According to Lenin, imperialism was a specific stage of development of capitalism; a stage he referred to as state monopoly capitalism. The Marxist movement was split on how to solve capitalism's resurgence and revitalisation after the great depression of the late-19th century. Eduard Bernstein, from the Social Democratic Party of Germany (SDP), considered capitalism' revitalisation as proof that capitalism was evolving into a more humane system, further adding that the basic aims of socialists were not to overthrow the state, but rather to take power through elections. On the other hand, Karl Kautsky, from the SDP, held a highly dogmatic view, claiming that there was no crisis within Marxist theory. Both of them, however, denied or belittled the role of class contradictions in society after the crisis. In contrast, Lenin believed that capitalism' resurgence was the beginning of a new phase of capitalism; this stage being created because of a strengthening of class contradiction, not because of its reduction.

Lenin did not know when the imperialist stage of capitalism began, and claimed it would be foolish to look for a specific year, however he did assert it began at the beginning of the 20th century (at least in Europe). Lenin believed that the economic crisis of 1900 accelerated and intensified the concentration of industry and banking, which led to the transformation of the finance capital connection to industry into the monopoly of large banks." In Imperialism: the Highest Stage of Capitalism, Lenin wrote; "the twentieth century marks the turning-point from the old capitalism to the new, from the domination of capital in general to the domination of finance capital." Lenin's defines imperialism as the monopoly stage of capitalism.

Despite radical anti-imperialism being an original core value of Bolshevism, the Soviet Union from 1939 onward was widely viewed as a de facto imperial power whose ideology could not allow it to admit its own imperialism. Through the Soviet ideological viewpoint, pro-Soviet factions in each country were the only legitimate voice of "the people" regardless of whether they were minority factions. All other factions were simply class enemies of "the people", inherently illegitimate rulers regardless of whether they were majority factions. Thus, in this view, any country that became Soviet or a Soviet ally naturally did so via a legitimate voluntary desire, even if the requesters needed Soviet help to accomplish it. The principal examples were the Soviet invasion of Finland yielding the annexation of Finnish parts of Karelia, the Soviet invasion of Poland, the Soviet occupation of the Baltic states, and the postwar de facto dominance over the satellite states of the Eastern Bloc under a pretense of total independence. In the post-Soviet era even many Ukrainians, Georgians, and Armenians feel that their countries were forcibly annexed by the Bolsheviks, but this has been a problematic view because the pro-Soviet factions in these societies were once sizable as well. Each faction felt that the other did not represent the true national interest. This civil war–like paradox has been seen in the annexation of Crimea by the Russian Federation, as pro-Russian Crimeans have been viewed as illegitimate by pro-Ukrainian Crimeans, and vice versa.

=== Peaceful coexistence ===
The loss by imperialism of its dominating role in world affairs and the utmost expansion of the sphere in which the laws of socialist foreign policy operate are a distinctive feature of the present stage of social development. The main direction of this development is toward even greater changes in the correlation of forces in the world arena in favour of socialism."

— Nikolay Inozemtsev, a Soviet foreign policy analyst, referring to series of events (which he believed) would lead to the ultimate victory of socialism.

"Peaceful coexistence" was an ideological concept introduced under Khrushchev's rule. While the concept has been interpreted by fellow communists as proposing an end to the conflict between the systems of capitalism and socialism, Khrushchev saw it instead as a continuation of the conflict in every area with the exception in the military field. The concept claimed that the two systems were developed "by way of diametrically opposed laws", which led to "opposite principles in foreign policy."

The concept was steeped in Leninist and Stalinist thought. Lenin believed that international politics were dominated by class struggle, and Stalin stressed in the 1940s the growing polarization which was occurring in the capitalist and socialist systems. Khrushchev's peaceful coexistence was based on practical changes which had occurred; he accused the old "two camp" theory of neglecting the non-aligned movement and the national liberation movements. Khrushchev considered these "grey areas", in which the conflict between capitalism and socialism would be fought. He still stressed that the main contradiction in international relations were those of capitalism and socialism. The Soviet Government under Khrushchev stressed the importance of peaceful coexistence, claiming it had to form the basis of Soviet foreign policy. Failure to do, they believed, would lead to nuclear conflict. Despite this, Soviet theorists still considered peaceful coexistence as a continuation of the class struggle between the capitalist and socialist worlds, just not one based on armed conflict. Khrushchev believed that the conflict, in its current phase, was mainly economical.

The emphasise on peaceful coexistence did not mean that the Soviet Union accepted a static world, with clear lines. They continued to upheld the creed that socialism was inevitable, and they sincerely believed that the world had reached a stage in which the "correlations of forces" were moving towards socialism. Also, with the establishment of socialist regimes in Eastern Europe and Asia, Soviet foreign policy-planners believed that capitalism had lost its dominance as an economic system.

=== Socialism in one country ===
The concept of "socialism in one country" was conceived by Stalin in his struggle against Leon Trotsky and his concept of permanent revolution. In 1924, Trotsky published his pamphlet Lessons of October in which he stated that socialism in the Soviet Union would fail because of the backward state of economic development unless a world revolution began. Stalin responded to Trotsky's pamphlet with his article, "October and Comrade Trotsky's Theory of Permanent Revolution". In it, Stalin stated, that he did not believe an inevitable conflict between the working class and the peasants would take place, further adding that "socialism in one country is completely possible and probable". Stalin held the view common amongst most Bolsheviks at the time; there was possibility of real success for socialism in the Soviet Union despite the country's backwardness and international isolation. While Grigoriy Zinoviev, Lev Kamenev and Nikolai Bukharin, together with Stalin, opposed Trotsky's theory of permanent revolution, they diverged on how socialism could be built. According to Bukharin, Zinoviev and Kamenev supported the resolution of the 14th Conference (held in 1925) which stated that "we cannot complete the building of socialism due to our technological backwardness." Despite the rather cynical attitude, Zinoviev and Kamenev did believe that a defective form of socialism could be constructed. At the 14th Conference, Stalin reiterated his position, claiming that socialism in one country was feasible despite the capitalist blockade of the country. After the conference, Stalin wrote "Concerning the Results of the XIV Conference of the RCP(b)", in which he stated that the peasantry would not turn against the socialist system because he believed they had a self-interest in preserving. The contradictions which would arise with the peasantry during the socialist transition, Stalin surmised, could "be overcome by our own efforts". He concluded that the only viable threat to socialism in the Soviet Union was a military intervention.

In late 1925, Stalin received a letter from a party official which stated that his position of "Socialism in One Country" was in contradiction with Friedrich Engels own writings on the subject. Stalin countered, stating that Engels' writings 'reflected' "the era of pre-monopoly capitalism, the pre-imperialist era when there were not yet the conditions of an uneven, abrupt development of the capitalist countries." From 1925 onwards, Bukharin began writing extensively on the subject, and in 1926, Stalin wrote On Questions of Leninism, which contained his best-known writings on the subject. Zinoviev, with the publishing of Leninism, began countering Bukharin's and Stalin's arguments, claiming that socialism in one country was possible, but only in the short-run, and claimed that without a world revolution it would be impossible to safeguard the Soviet Union from the "restoration of bourgeoisie relations". Zinoviev held steadfast to Lenin's own position from 1917 to 1922, and continued to claim that only a defecting form of socialism could be constructed in the Soviet Union without a world revolution. Bukharin, by now, began arguing for the creation of an autarkic economic model, while Trotsky, in contrast, claimed that the Soviet Union had to participate in the international division of labour to develop. In contrast to Trotsky and Bukharin, Stalin did not believe a world revolution was possible, claiming in 1938 that a world revolution was in fact impossible, and claiming that Engels was wrong on the matter. At the 18th Congress, Stalin took the theory to its inevitable conclusion, claiming that the communist mode of production could be conceived in one country. He rationalised this by claiming that the state could exist in a communist society, as long as the Soviet Union was encircled by capitalism. However, surprisingly, with the establishment of satellite states in Eastern Europe, Stalin claimed that socialism in one country was only possible in a large country like the Soviet Union, and that the other states, in order to survive, had to follow the Soviet line.

=== Market socialism ===
Between 1985 and 1991, the Communist Party of the Soviet Union (CPSU) underwent a fundamental ideological transformation, shifting from traditional Marxist–Leninist orthodoxy toward models of market socialism and democratic socialism. This evolution was spearheaded by Mikhail Gorbachev, who initiated perestroika (restructuring) and glasnost (openness) as part of an effort to rejuvenate the Soviet system through selective decentralization and democratization. Initially, Gorbachev framed these reforms as a return to the "true" democratic spirit of Leninism, but they increasingly incorporated features associated with Western social democracy, such as private enterprise, market regulation, and political pluralism. As White notes, the period saw "a move away from classical command socialism and towards a system more compatible with market coordination and democratic accountability".

This shift was underpinned by a redefinition of socialism not as a static set of economic relations, but as a flexible, evolving system responsive to contemporary challenges. Gorbachev asserted that socialism must be "deeply democratic" and grounded in civil society rather than bureaucratic inertia. The 1988 Law on Cooperatives legalized small-scale private enterprise, and by the 28th Party Congress in 1990, the CPSU officially recognized political pluralism and supported a mixed economy. This marked a decisive break from centralized economic planning and the monolithic party-state model.

However, these reforms triggered ideological fragmentation and institutional instability. While Gorbachev hoped to salvage socialism through democratization and limited market reform, the dismantling of central controls accelerated the unraveling of the Soviet system. As Brown argues, the CPSU's endorsement of "socialist pluralism" lacked a coherent framework, leading to a crisis of authority and legitimacy. Ultimately, the party's pivot toward democratic socialism and market coordination failed to sustain the Soviet state, which collapsed in December 1991.

== See also ==
- Bolshevism
- Brezhnev Doctrine
- Ideology of the Chinese Communist Party
- Ideology of the Workers' Party of Korea
- Ho Chi Minh Thought
- Kadarism
- Politics of Fidel Castro
- Ceaușism
- Real socialism
