= GegenStandpunkt =

German theory journal

GegenStandpunkt. Politische Vierteljahreszeitschrift
- Editor-in-Chief: Dr. Peter Decker
- Categories: Marxist theory, political economy, political theory
- Frequency: quarterly
- Publisher: Bruno Schumacher
- First issue: 1992
- Company: GegenStandpunkt Verlagsgesellschaft mbH
- Country: Germany
- Based in: Munich
- Language: German
- Website: https://gegenstandpunkt.com/
- ISSN: 0941-5831

GegenStandpunkt. Politische Vierteljahreszeitschrift (lit. Opposing Viewpoint; GSP) is a quarterly Marxist theory journal published by the company with the same name, based in Munich. It was founded in succession of several publications of the dissolved Marxist Group (MG), especially Marxistische Streit- und Zeitschrift (MSZ). The Federal Office for the Protection of the Constitution observed the journal until 2018 and categorized it as far-left.

== Overview ==
GegenStandpunkt is published in quarterly issues of 100–200 pages. The contents of the journal consist of shorter, sometimes polemical comments on recent events in politics and media as well as longer analyses, both according to the journal's theoretical framework of criticism of capitalism. The journal often addresses basic questions about the bourgeois state and capitalist political economy. All issues up to 2024 are available as free articles on the German website. Selected articles and publications are provided for free in English, Spanish, French, Italian, Russian and Dutch translations.

The editor-in-chief was Karl Held from the journal's foundation in 1992 until his death in 2010. His successor is the current editor-in-chief Peter Decker. Known contributors are industry sociologist Theo Wentzke and former University of Bremen professors Margaret Wirth and Freerk Huisken.

In some cities commentaries have been broadcast on noncommercial radio stations (Frankfurt am Main – Radio X; Munich – Radio Lora; Marburg – Radio Unerhört Marburg; Vienna – Orange 94.0).

== Books ==
In addition to the journal, the GegenStandpunkt publishing company publishes a series of books on topics such as Work and Wealth, Finance Capital, The Democratic State, the Competition of Capitalists, Fascism, and Psychology of the private individual. Several of these books are reprints of publications of the preceding organization Marxist Group.
