= Miliband–Poulantzas debate =

Marxist debate on the capitalist state

The Miliband–Poulantzas debate was a debate between Marxist theorists Ralph Miliband and Nicos Poulantzas over the nature of the state in capitalism. Their exchange was published in the New Left Review between 1969 and 1976. Miliband, arguing from what became known as an "instrumentalist" position, saw the state as a direct tool of a ruling capitalist class. Poulantzas, arguing from a "structuralist" perspective, maintained that the state could not be understood as a simple instrument, but was a structure that functioned to ensure the long-term reproduction of capitalism, granting it a degree of relative autonomy from the direct control of any single class.

The debate began with Poulantzas's 1969 review of Miliband's book The State in Capitalist Society. While praising Miliband's work for challenging the dominant pluralist theories of the state, Poulantzas criticised it for being too focused on the motivations and interpersonal relationships of the "state elite", a method he labelled "a problematic of the subject". He argued that the state's role is determined by the objective structures of the capitalist mode of production, not by the class origins or intentions of those who run it. Miliband replied by defending the importance of empirical analysis and accused Poulantzas of "structural super-determinism", an abstract formalism that made it impossible to account for the actions of social agents. The exchange became a central reference point for Marxist state theory in the 1970s and led to a wider "state debate" that fractured Marxist political theory into opposing schools of thought.

Although often framed as an irreconcilable conflict between empiricism and theory, or agency and structure, scholars have since re-evaluated the debate. Many now argue that the stark opposition between instrumentalism and structuralism was an oversimplification, a "polemical caricature", that obscured significant common ground between the two theorists. Both Miliband and Poulantzas were working to develop a critical theory of the state, and their later works showed a convergence on key issues, particularly the state's relative autonomy and its function in managing class conflict. The debate remains influential in political science and sociology for its rigorous exploration of state power, class, and ideology.

== Background ==
The debate erupted in the late 1960s, a period of political turmoil and intellectual ferment. The civil rights movement, anti-war protests, and the events of May 1968 in France challenged the prevailing assumptions of mainstream social science. In Anglo-American political science and sociology, the dominant theories were pluralism and systems theory. Pluralists like Robert A. Dahl viewed power in Western societies as widely diffused among competing interest groups, with the state acting as a neutral arbiter. Systems theorists like David Easton replaced the concept of the "state" with that of the "political system", which they saw as a self-regulating mechanism for maintaining social equilibrium. These theories struggled to account for the deep-seated conflicts and rebellions occurring within advanced capitalist societies.

This crisis in "bourgeois social science" created an opening for the revival of Marxism in universities. Ralph Miliband's The State in Capitalist Society (1969) and Nicos Poulantzas's Political Power and Social Classes (1968) were two of the most significant works to emerge from this revival. Both aimed to develop a rigorous Marxist theory of the state, a subject that Miliband noted had been largely neglected by Marxists since Vladimir Lenin.

Miliband was a prominent figure of the British New Left, a professor at the London School of Economics, and a co-founder of the Socialist Register. His work built on the empirical tradition of power-structure research pioneered by sociologists like C. Wright Mills. Poulantzas was a Greek-French legal philosopher and sociologist based in Paris, associated with the structural Marxism of Louis Althusser. While Miliband undertook an immanent critique of pluralism, using empirical evidence to challenge its claims, Poulantzas developed an alternative theoretical framework based on Althusser's re-reading of Marx. The debate between them began when Poulantzas published a critique of Miliband's book in the New Left Review in late 1969.

== The theories of the state ==
=== Miliband and the instrumentalist view ===
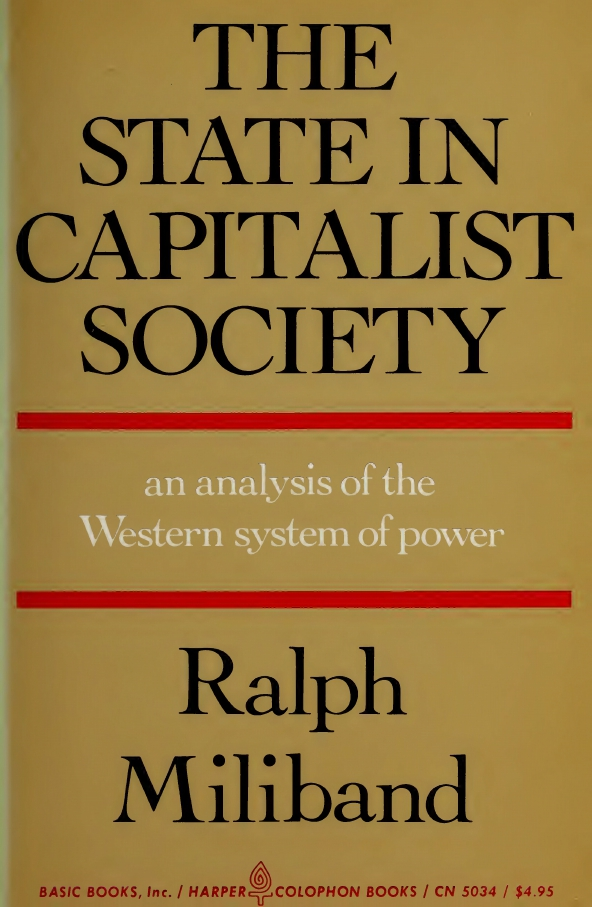
Cover of Miliband's The State in Capitalist Society (1969)

Miliband's theory, as outlined in The State in Capitalist Society, is often summarized by his statement that "in the Marxist scheme, the 'ruling class' of capitalist society is that class which owns and controls the means of production and which is able, by virtue of the economic power thus conferred upon it, to use the state as its instrument for the domination of society." This position became known as "instrumentalism" because it appeared to view the state as a simple tool or instrument directly wielded by the capitalist class.

Miliband's analysis consisted of a detailed empirical investigation of the "state system" in advanced Western societies. He broke down the state into several key institutions: the government, the administration (civil service), the military and police, the judiciary, and sub-central governments. He then argued that the capitalist class is able to dominate these institutions through its control of the "command posts" of the state. He documented this by showing the overwhelmingly bourgeois social background of the "state elite"—the top-ranking civil servants, military officers, judges, and government ministers. He argued that the shared class background and ideology of the state elite and the capitalist class creates a strong presumption of a common outlook and political bias.

However, Miliband's analysis was more nuanced than a simple instrumentalist model suggests. He did not claim that capitalists directly "govern", but rather that they "reign". He also acknowledged that the state is not a monolithic entity and that gaining governmental power does not equate to controlling the entire state apparatus. Crucially, Miliband argued that the state's bias toward capital is not solely a result of interpersonal ties. He identified a powerful structural constraint on state autonomy: the dependence of the state on the health of the capitalist economy. Governments, whatever their political leanings, are compelled to pursue policies that foster "business confidence" to ensure private investment and economic growth, upon which state revenue and political legitimacy depend. The threat of capital flight or an investment strike represents a "massive superiority" of pressure that business can exert "without the need of organisation, campaigns, and lobbying."

=== Poulantzas and the structuralist view ===
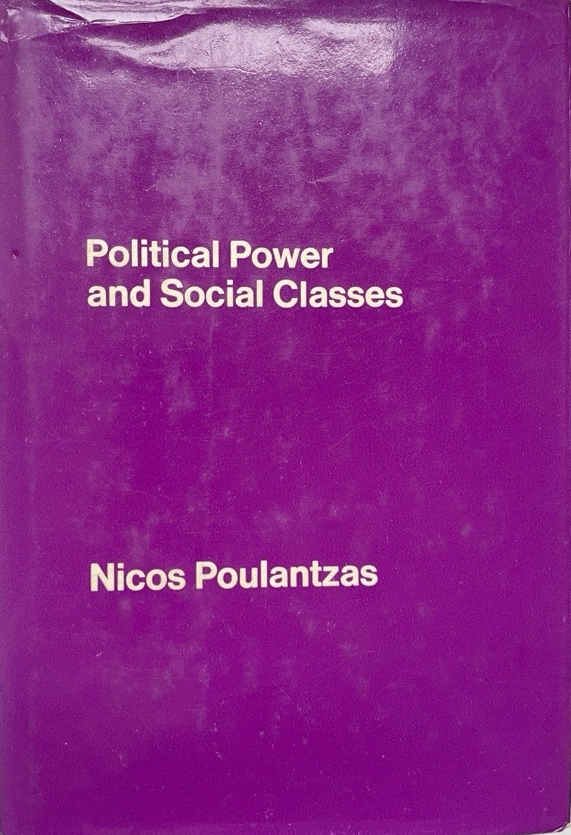
Cover of the first English edition of Poulantzas's Political Power and Social Classes (1968)

Poulantzas's theory, first elaborated in Political Power and Social Classes, argued that the state cannot be understood as an instrument in the hands of a single class. Instead, he defined the state by its function within the broader structure of capitalist society. For Poulantzas, the primary function of the state is to maintain the cohesion and long-term equilibrium of the social formation. It does this by acting as the "factor of cohesion" between the different levels of a society (the economic, the political, and the ideological) and by organising the dominant class while disorganising the dominated classes.

This functional role requires the state to possess "relative autonomy" from the particular interests of individual capitalists or fractions of the capitalist class. Poulantzas argued that the state must be able to act against the short-term economic interests of some capitalists in order to preserve the long-term political interests of the capitalist class as a whole and the stability of the system. For example, the state may impose regulations, grant concessions to workers (such as welfare policies or labour rights), or mediate conflicts between different capitalist factions.

Poulantzas argued that this relative autonomy is structurally determined and is not dependent on the will or intentions of social actors. The state functions as a "capitalist state" not because it is run by capitalists, but because its very structure is shaped by the logic of the capitalist mode of production. In a now-famous passage, he wrote:

The relation between the bourgeois class and the State is an objective relation. This means that if the function of the state in a determinate social formation and the interests of the dominant class in this formation coincide, it is by reason of the system itself: the direct participation of members of the ruling class in the state apparatus is not the cause but the effect, and moreover a chance and contingent one, of this objective coincidence.

Thus, for Poulantzas, the class background of the state elite was a secondary issue. The state serves the interests of capital because its institutional framework filters out anti-capitalist actions and promotes policies that reproduce the system. He drew a sharp distinction between "state power" (the capacity of a class to realise its interests) and the "state apparatus" (the set of state institutions). He argued that institutions do not, strictly speaking, have power; they are the site where the power of social classes is exercised and condensed.

== The exchanges ==
The debate unfolded across a series of articles in the New Left Review. From the outset, Poulantzas framed the disagreement as a "problem of method" rather than a simple disagreement over the facts.

=== First exchange (1969–1970) ===
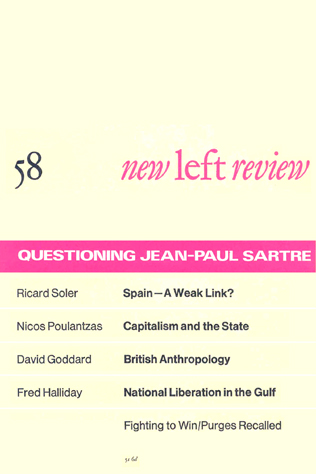
Cover of New Left Review issue 58 (November–December 1969), containing Poulantzas's article "The Problem of the Capitalist State"

Poulantzas's initial review in 1969, "The Problem of the Capitalist State", accused Miliband of "empiricism". He argued that Miliband focused on the observable actions and motivations of individuals—the "problem of the subject"—at the expense of analysing the underlying objective structures that determine the state's role. By attempting to empirically prove the existence of a ruling class through an analysis of the state elite, Miliband had, in Poulantzas's view, become "contaminated by the very epistemological principles of the adversary" (i.e., pluralism). Poulantzas insisted that a truly Marxist analysis must begin with theory, with the "scientific concepts" of the capitalist mode of production, rather than with "concrete facts".

Miliband responded in 1970 with his article "The Capitalist State: Reply to Nicos Poulantzas". He defended the necessity of empirical enquiry, arguing that the central tenets of Marxism must be demonstrated, not simply asserted as theoretical axioms. He criticised Poulantzas's approach as "structural super-determinism", a form of theoretical abstractionism that made social actors mere "bearers" (Träger) of objective structures, leaving no room for agency. Miliband argued that Poulantzas's exclusive focus on "objective relations" implied that "what the state does is in every particular and at all times is wholly determined by these 'objective relations'," effectively turning state managers into mere functionaries of the system. He maintained that while structural constraints are real and important, there is still a significant degree of autonomy for actors within the state, making their class background and ideology relevant factors.

=== Second exchange (1973) ===
After the English translation of Political Power and Social Classes was published, Miliband continued the debate in 1973 with "Poulantzas and the Capitalist State". He sharpened his critique of Poulantzas's methodology, calling it "structuralist abstractionism". He criticised the book's "opaque scholasticism" and its failure to engage with concrete historical or contemporary reality, noting that "the book hardly contains any reference at all to an actual capitalist state anywhere." Miliband argued that Poulantzas's theoretical framework was so abstract that it cut him off from "the political analysis of a concrete conjuncture." He also argued that the concept of relative autonomy was already embedded in the classical Marxist formulation from The Communist Manifesto—that the state is "but a committee for managing the common affairs of the whole bourgeoisie"—and did not require Poulantzas's complex theoretical apparatus.

=== Third exchange and stalemate (1976) ===
Poulantzas's final reply, "The Capitalist State: A Reply to Miliband and Laclau", was published in 1976. By this time, the debate had attracted wide attention, and the terms "instrumentalism" and "structuralism" were being widely used to describe the two positions. Poulantzas dismissed these labels as "an utterly mistaken way of situating the discussion." He largely dismissed Miliband's criticisms, stating that their approaches were situated on "disparate [epistemological] terrains" and that Miliband's writings were "marked by the absence of any theoretical problematic".

Poulantzas sought to reframe the conflict, arguing that the real disagreement was not about method but about a fundamental ideological divide between "materialism (Marxism) and idealism (bourgeois ideology)". He turned Miliband's charge of "super-determinism" back on him, suggesting that such criticisms historically came from a "bourgeois subjectivist idealism" that overemphasised the role of individuals and free will. The exchange ended in a stalemate, with Poulantzas concluding that all that remained of Miliband's critique was "a polemical catch-phrase pure and simple, masking a factual and empirical critique."

== Legacy and re-evaluation ==
The Miliband–Poulantzas debate set the terms for Marxist state theory for over a decade. However, the rigid dichotomy between instrumentalism and structuralism that emerged from the debate is now widely seen by scholars as an oversimplification and a "misleading diversion".

=== The "instrumentalism" caricature ===
The label "instrumentalism" became an "analytically constructed ideal-type" that was often used to dismiss Miliband's work without engaging its nuances. Critics frequently acknowledged Miliband's "sophisticated, nuanced, and multilevel analysis" but proceeded to critique his work based on a simplistic caricature that ignored his extensive discussion of structural constraints. Political scientist Clyde Barrow argues that many of Miliband's critics appeared "to have never read more than the first half of Miliband's The State in Capitalist Society", glossing over entire chapters that contravened the ideal-type of instrumentalism. The debate was further complicated because Poulantzas's initial critique of voluntarism and "historicism" was originally aimed at the work of C. Wright Mills, whose theory in his book The Power Elite (1956) was considered a form of "plain Marxism". Poulantzas then extended these same criticisms to Miliband without acknowledging the extent to which Miliband had already surpassed Mills in theoretical sophistication.

=== Re-evaluation of Poulantzas ===
Similarly, Poulantzas's position was often caricatured as a form of rigid, "hyper-structuralism" that denied any role for class struggle. However, scholars later began to distinguish between an "early Poulantzas" and a "mature Poulantzas". His later works, particularly Fascism and Dictatorship (1974) and State, Power, Socialism (1978), placed much greater emphasis on the role of class struggle in shaping the state and its policies. Some scholars attribute this shift to an "epiphany" following the events of May 1968. Others, including Poulantzas himself, argued that this emphasis was always present in his work and that he had fundamental differences with the more deterministic structuralism of Althusser from the beginning. This re-evaluation has highlighted a greater continuity and internal complexity in Poulantzas's thought, moving his theory away from abstract formalism and toward a form of "historical structuralism".

=== Influence on state theory ===
By the early 1980s, interest in state theory began to wane as the debate settled into an "artificial methodological stalemate". However, the questions raised by Miliband and Poulantzas continued to influence political theory. The rise of globalization led to a new "return to the state" in the 2000s, as theorists sought to understand the changing form and function of the nation-state in a globalised world. Theorists like Leo Panitch, Bob Jessop, and Ellen Meiksins Wood have built upon the foundations laid by Miliband and Poulantzas to analyse the "internationalization of the state" and the role of states in authoring and enforcing the rules of global capitalism. The debate is now seen by many not as a sterile dichotomy, but as having created the conceptual space for a more synthetic understanding of the state, integrating Miliband's focus on institutional analysis and class agency with Poulantzas's insights into objective structures and systemic constraints.

== See also ==
- Marx's theory of the state
- State derivation
