= Marx's theory of the state =

Theory developed by Karl Marx

Marx's theory of the state comprises the political theories developed by Karl Marx and Friedrich Engels concerning the state as an institution, its origins, its development, and its role in society and class struggle. Marx's view of the state evolved throughout his life, moving from a youthful embrace of conventional republicanism to a later critique of the state as an instrument of class rule and ultimately to the conclusion that the state must be abolished. Rather than a single, coherent theory, Marx and Engels's work on the state contains a variety of perspectives that co-exist in an "uneasy and unstable relation", providing the basis for the subsequent diversification of Marxist state theories.

The scholarship of political scientist Richard N. Hunt has shown that Marx and Engels's mature thought contains two distinct, though interwoven, theories of the state, developed independently by each man before their later synthesis. Marx first developed a theory of the state as a "parasite", an alienated social institution separate from society with its own interests. Drawing on his experience as an editor of the Rheinische Zeitung and his critique of Georg Wilhelm Friedrich Hegel's philosophy, Marx saw the state's bureaucracy as its core, an entity that treated the state as its own "private property". Concurrently, Engels, based on his observations of the English political system in Manchester, developed a theory of the state as an instrument of class rule—a "class state" controlled by the propertied classes to oppress the propertyless.

The two men later synthesized these views in The German Ideology, positing that the state is generally an instrument of the ruling class but can, under certain conditions, achieve a degree of independence from all social classes. The "parasite state" model was later applied to historical forms such as absolute monarchy, Bonapartism, and Oriental despotism. In their mature work, Marx and Engels also analyzed the state as a factor of social cohesion, whose function is to moderate class conflict and maintain the social order.

In the transition to communism, Marx and Engels argued for a "dictatorship of the proletariat". For them, this was not a dictatorial regime in the modern sense but rather the democratic rule of the entire working class during a transitional revolutionary period. They sharply distinguished this majoritarian, democratic concept from the Blanquist model of a dictatorship by an elite revolutionary vanguard. In their late careers, Marx and Engels also developed new theories of revolutionary strategy, outlining a path for "legal revolution" in countries with democratic institutions and, conversely, a strategy for "skipping stages" of development in backward, peasant-based countries like Russia. The ultimate goal of communism was the establishment of a stateless society. They argued that the professional, bureaucratic "parasite state" would be transcended by a system of popular self-administration modeled on the Paris Commune—a "democracy without professionals". The coercive "class state" would "wither away" as class conflict ceased.

== Early democratic republicanism (1842–1843) ==
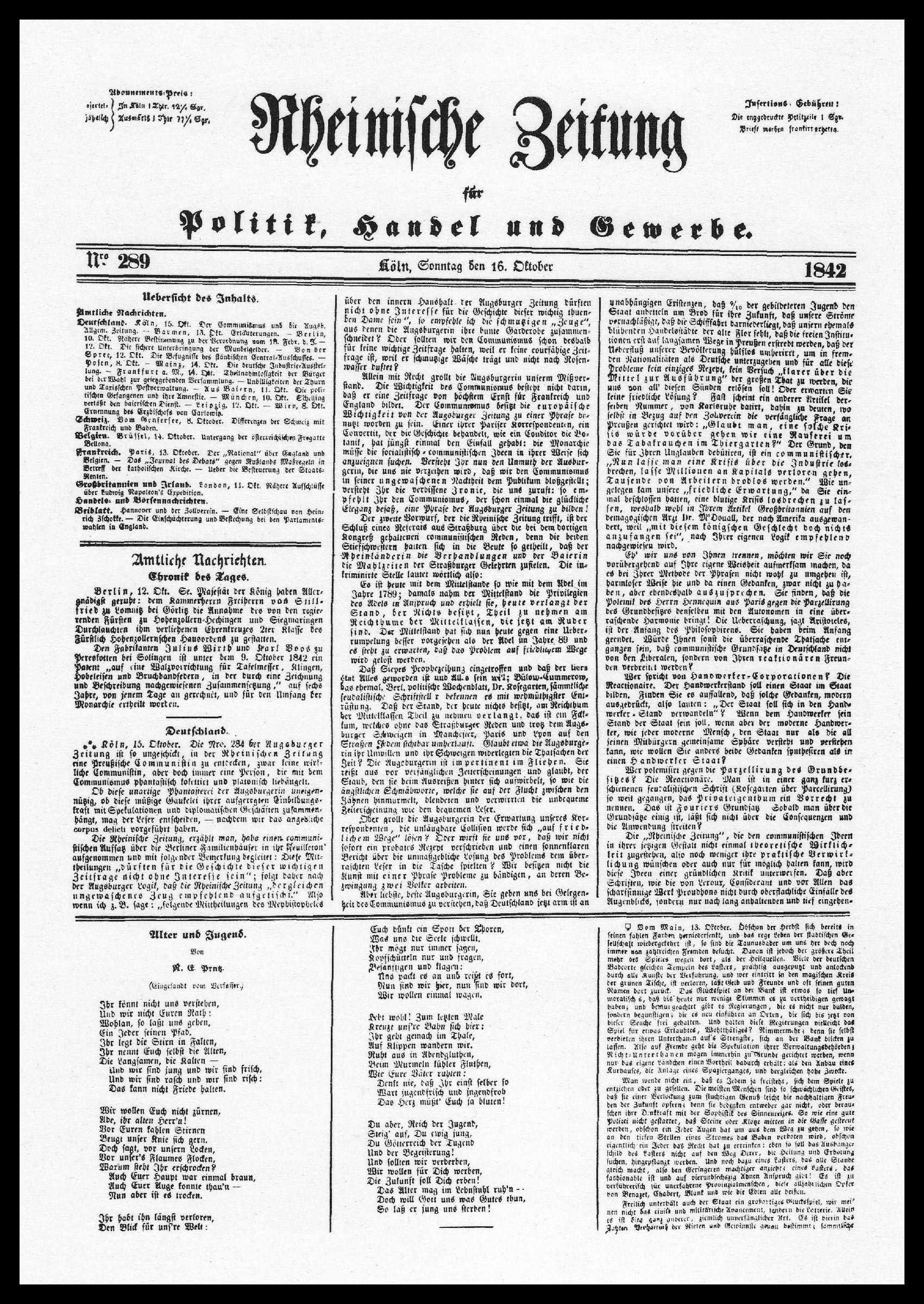
The Rheinische Zeitung, where Karl Marx first developed his critique of the Prussian bureaucracy

Marx's earliest political theories, developed during his tenure as editor of the Rheinische Zeitung (1842–1843), were rooted in the democratic republican tradition and the philosophy of Georg Wilhelm Friedrich Hegel. During this period, Marx did not yet see the state as an expression of class interests but rather as an entity that stood in opposition to private interests. He defended liberal democratic principles, including freedom of the press, popular sovereignty, and the separation of governmental powers, seeing these as essential for a rational and ethical state. As a "democratic extremist", Marx criticised not only the Prussian government but also the liberal opposition, who he believed were compromising on the principle of democracy.

His critique of the Prussian state centred on its bureaucracy. Drawing on Hegel's distinction between the state and civil society, Marx initially conceived of the bureaucracy as the "universal class" meant to mediate between the particular interests of civil society and the general interest of the state. However, his direct experience with the arbitrary power of Prussian censors and the government's defense of landed interests (as in the debates on the wood-theft laws) led him to a radical revision of this view. He concluded that the bureaucracy, far from being a neutral arbiter, had become a self-interested "party against another party".

In articles such as his critique of the Prussian censorship instruction and his analysis of the distress of the Moselle winegrowers, Marx argued that the bureaucracy had become an alienated power that treated the state as its own private domain. He wrote that the state official "debases the interest of the state into his own private interest". The bureaucracy, with its internal hierarchy, secrecy, and "haughty conceit", transforms the state's aims into the aims of its own bureaus, standing in opposition to the very society it is supposed to serve. He championed a radical conception of democracy based on "democratic control from below", arguing that the authority of elected representatives stemmed entirely from the people they represent and not from any fetishistic reverence for the state itself. This analysis marked the beginning of Marx's theory of the state as a parasitic institution, a concept he would develop more fully in his critique of Hegel.

== The "parasite state" theory (1843) ==
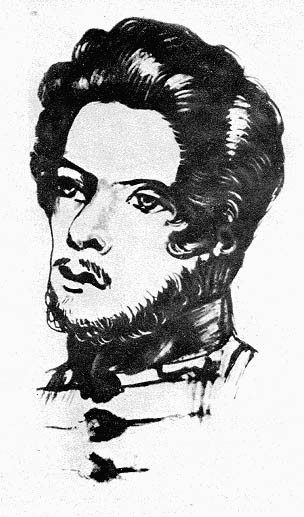
Depiction of the young Karl Marx

In the summer of 1843, after the suppression of the Rheinische Zeitung, Marx secluded himself in Kreuznach and produced his Critique of Hegel's Philosophy of Right. This manuscript contains his first systematic formulation of a theory of the state. According to Richard N. Hunt, this theory presents the state as a "parasite", an alienated power feeding on society. Influenced by Ludwig Feuerbach's "transformative method", which treated religious alienation as a projection of human qualities onto a divine being, Marx applied a similar critique to political alienation. He inverted Hegel's philosophy, arguing that the state does not produce civil society; rather, civil society produces the state. The state, for Marx, was not the "actuality of the ethical Idea" as Hegel claimed, but an emanation of the material conditions of civil society. There is considerable scholarly debate over the maturity of this early theory. Some, like Lucio Colletti, have argued that it represents a near-definitive Marxist theory of the state, while others, like Bob Jessop, contend that it remains heavily imbued with philosophical abstractions and lacks the foundations of historical materialism.

Marx traced the historical development of this separation between the "political state" and "civil society". In the polis of classical antiquity, the res publica was the "real private concern" of the citizen; there was no separation between public and private life. In the Middle Ages, political functions were diffused throughout society, with every private sphere (estates, guilds, corporations) having a political character. This was what Marx called the "democracy of unfreedom". The modern era, beginning with the French Revolution, completed the separation. The revolution "abolished the political character of civil society", reducing it to a sphere of atomistic, egoistic individuals, while simultaneously creating a separate, alienated political sphere in the modern state.

This modern state is a parasitic entity whose core is the bureaucracy. The bureaucracy "holds the state in its possession; it is its private property". It is an "imaginary state alongside the real state", with its own interests and logic, operating in opposition to civil society. This theory does not present the state as an instrument of a particular social class. Instead, the ruler and his bureaucrats are their own masters, serving only their own interests. The ultimate goal for Marx was to overcome this alienation and reabsorb the state into society, creating a "true democracy" where the separation between public and private life would be abolished, and public affairs would once again become the direct concern of every citizen.

== Engels and the "class state" theory (1843–1845) ==
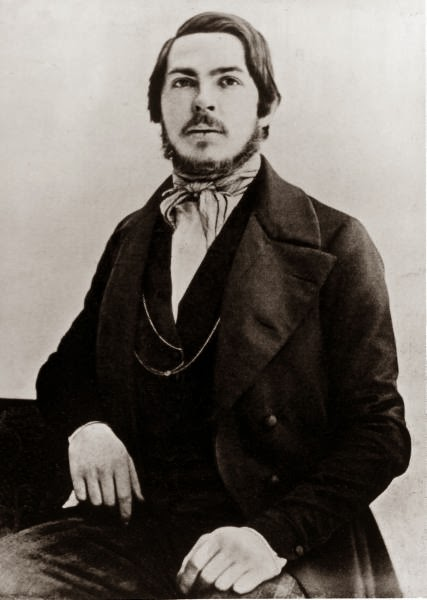
Friedrich Engels developed his theory of the state as a class instrument based on his observations in England.

While Marx was developing his theory of the parasite state in Germany, Friedrich Engels was independently formulating a different theory based on his experiences in England between 1842 and 1844. Hunt identifies this as the theory of the "class state", where the state is an instrument used by a dominant economic class to oppress other classes. In contrast to Marx's Hegelian-inspired philosophical path, Engels's stay in Manchester was the "fundamental formative influence" that enabled him to anticipate the mature Marxian class theory of the state.

Engels's analysis of the English constitution, detailed in a series of articles written from Manchester, concluded that behind its formal structure of a balance of powers lay the reality of class rule. He argued that the monarchy had been reduced to a ceremonial role and the House of Lords was an impotent "old people's home for retired statesmen". Real power resided in the House of Commons, but this body was not "really democratic". Through property qualifications for voting and running for office, as well as outright corruption, the Commons was controlled by the propertied classes: the landed aristocracy and the rising industrial and commercial bourgeoisie. For Engels, "Property rules" was the essential truth of the English system.

Engels saw the state, including its legal system and police, as an apparatus of coercion designed to protect property and maintain the subjugation of the propertyless working class (the proletariat). He documented how rights such as freedom of the press, freedom of assembly, and even habeas corpus were effectively guaranteed only for the wealthy. From these observations, Engels concluded that "political history" was a struggle between classes for control of the state, which then becomes the primary instrument for the dominance of one class over another. This instrumentalist view of the state, where political power is a direct function of economic power, stood in contrast to Marx's contemporary view of the state as an autonomous, parasitic entity.

== Synthesis and later applications ==
When Marx and Engels began their close collaboration in Brussels in 1845, they merged their two distinct theories of the state into a more complex, unified whole. This synthesis is most clearly articulated in their joint work, The German Ideology (1846). The result was a dual theory that could account for both the state's typical role as an instrument of class rule and its ability, in certain historical circumstances, to achieve a degree of autonomy. Scholars like Jessop have identified several distinct but interconnected themes in their mature work, including the state as an instrument of class rule, a factor of social cohesion, an institutional ensemble, and a reflection of the economic base.

The synthesis reconciled the "parasite state" and "class state" theories by assigning them to different historical periods and conditions. Engels's class-instrument theory was adopted as the explanation for the state in most major historical epochs, where a single class (such as feudal lords or the bourgeoisie) holds clear economic and political dominance. In The German Ideology, they wrote that the modern state "is nothing more than the form of organization which the bourgeois necessarily adopt ... for the mutual guarantee of their property and interests". Political power was defined in the Communist Manifesto as "merely the organized power of one class for oppressing another". This model was applied in their mature analyses of the oligarchic bourgeois states of Great Britain, France (under the July Monarchy), and the United States, where they argued that the state was controlled by the propertied classes, albeit often in alliance with the aristocracy or, in the US, with small farmers. The state also functions as a factor of cohesion, moderating class conflict to keep it "within the bounds of social order" and thereby securing the reproduction of the dominant mode of production. This sometimes requires the state to act against the immediate interests of individual capitalists to protect the long-term interests of the capitalist class as a whole, as seen in the enactment of factory legislation.

Marx's parasite state theory was repurposed to explain exceptional situations where no single class is able to establish firm control. This model was applied to historical forms such as absolute monarchy, Bonapartism, and Oriental despotism. In such cases of "autonomisation of the state", which arise from a temporary equilibrium in the class struggle, a powerful bureaucratic and military apparatus, controlled by a single ruler or an autonomous caste, is able to rule over a society of otherwise balanced or atomised social classes. The tendency of the state toward autonomy was heightened by what Marx considered the "political inaptitude" of the capitalist class, which, preoccupied with economic activity, was often unwilling or unable to wield political power directly. Later in life, Engels argued that every state has a tendency toward autonomy, a "striving for as much independence as possible", but this tendency is only fully realised in exceptional cases.

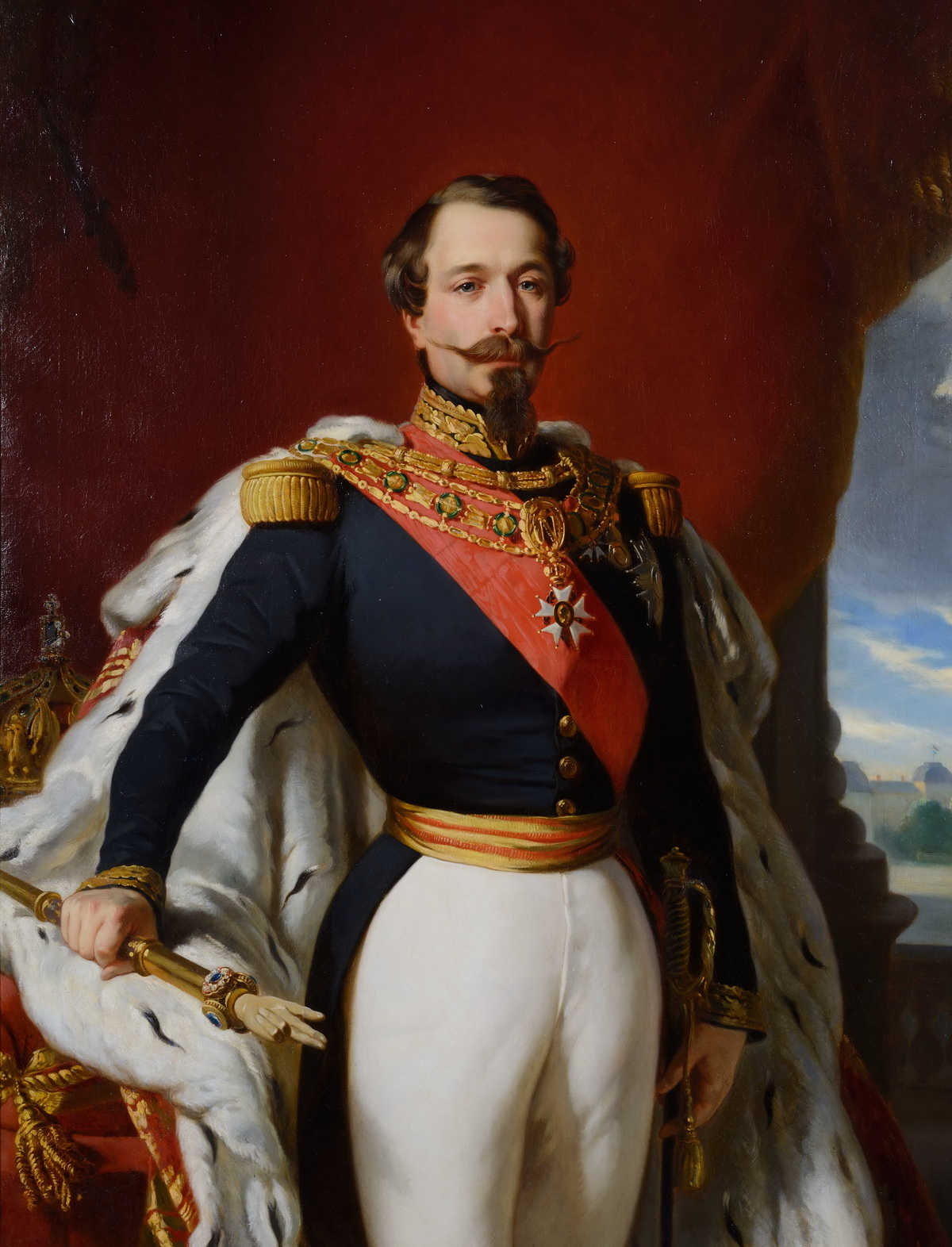
Napoleon III, whose regime Marx analyzed as "Bonapartist" in his work The Eighteenth Brumaire of Louis Bonaparte (1852)

Marx and Engels argued that during the era of absolute monarchy, for example, the state bureaucracy developed into an "independent force" that stood above the contending classes of the declining aristocracy and the rising bourgeoisie. This independent, bureaucratic state was a "transition stage" that, in most of Europe, was eventually "bought" or overthrown by the bourgeoisie and transformed into an instrument of its own rule. In Germany, however, this independent state had persisted. In the case of Bonapartism in France under Napoleon III (and its counterpart in Otto von Bismarck's Germany), the state machine was able to play the bourgeoisie off against the proletariat, ruling as an autonomous power while still, in the final analysis, protecting the social and economic order of the bourgeoisie. In the case of Oriental despotism, the absence of powerful social classes due to state ownership of all land allowed the state to rule as a despotic power over a society of atomised and self-sufficient villages.

== The revolutionary state ==
Marx and Engels saw the revolutionary transition from capitalism to communism as requiring a temporary form of state power, which they came to call the "dictatorship of the proletariat". This concept is one of the most controversial in their political thought, but Hunt argues that their understanding of the term was fundamentally democratic and distinct from its later totalitarian interpretations.

For Marx and Engels, a "dictatorship" was not necessarily the rule of one person or a small elite but rather the government of an entire class during a revolutionary provisorium—an extralegal interregnum between the destruction of an old constitutional order and the creation of a new one. They developed this concept during the Revolutions of 1848, arguing that the democratically elected assemblies in Prussia and Frankfurt were compelled to act "dictatorially" to defend the revolution against the old regimes. A proletarian revolution would likewise require such an energetic, constituent dictatorship by the majority class to overcome the resistance of the old ruling classes and "shatter" the old state machinery.

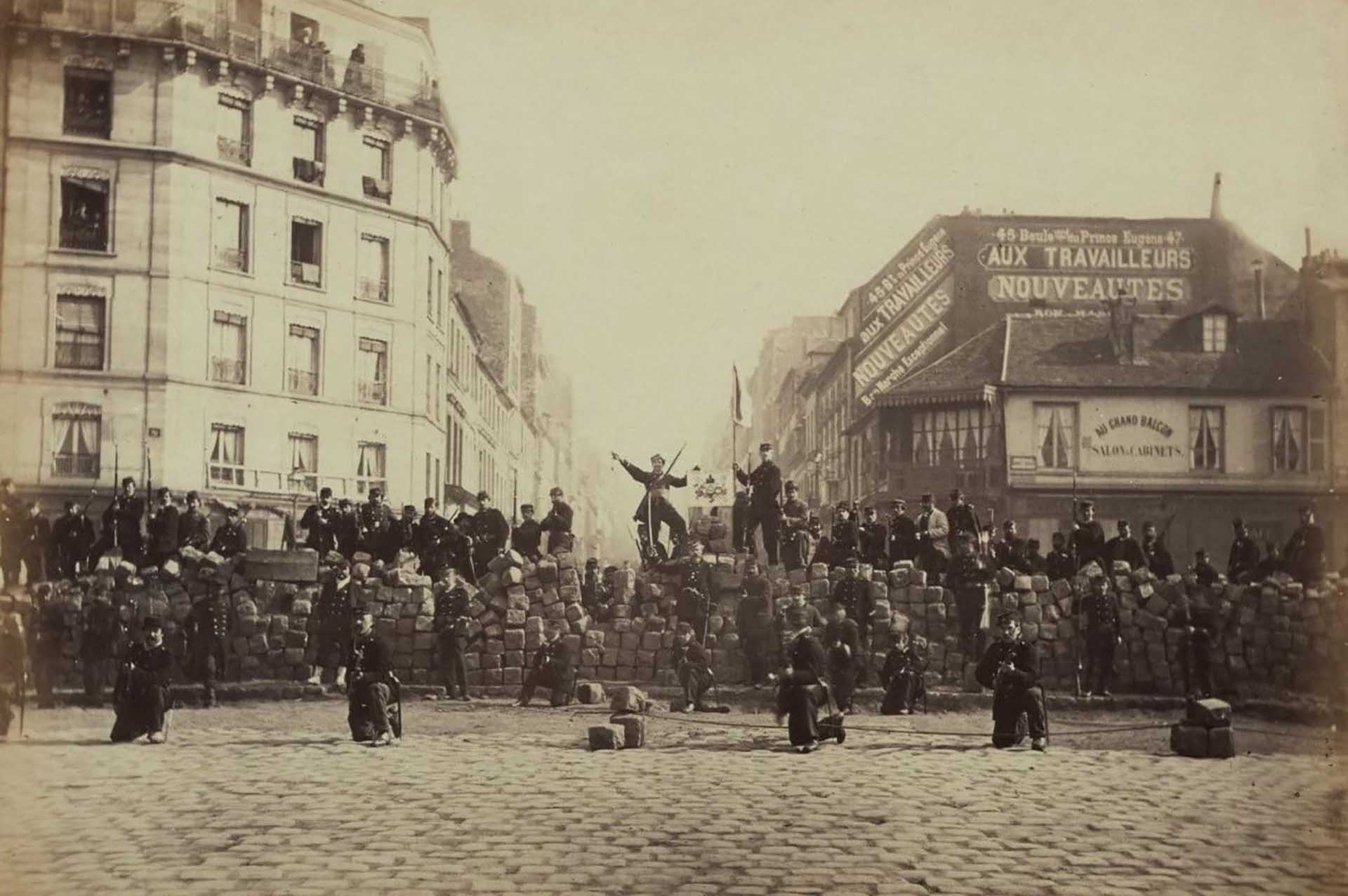
Barricade during the Paris Commune of 1871, which Marx and Engels cited as an example of the "dictatorship of the proletariat"

They sharply contrasted their democratic conception with the Blanquist idea of a dictatorship by a small, secret revolutionary vanguard. Whereas the Blanquists believed a minority elite must seize power and educate the immature masses, Marx and Engels insisted that the revolution must be the work of the conscious majority of the proletariat. This principle of proletarian self-emancipation was fundamental to their politics. As formulated in Marx's third Thesis on Feuerbach, the educator must himself be educated; revolutionary change is a simultaneous process of changing circumstances and self-change ("revolutionary practice"). Their model was the Paris Commune of 1871, which Engels explicitly called "the Dictatorship of the Proletariat". He praised it not for authoritarian measures but for its radically democratic structure: universal suffrage, elected and instantly recallable officials, the abolition of the standing army in favour of a popular militia, and the fusion of executive and legislative functions.

Thus, for Marx and Engels, the dictatorship of the proletariat was the "specific form" of working-class rule: a democratic republic in which the armed working class held power during a transitional period. Their analysis of the Commune marked a significant theoretical advance, with a "strongly anti-instrumentalist" thrust. It demonstrated that the working class cannot simply seize the existing state machinery because the state's class character is found not just in who controls it, but in its very institutional structure, which is designed for class rule and must therefore be "smashed" and replaced.

== Later revolutionary strategies ==
In the 1870s, Marx and Engels developed two new revolutionary strategies corresponding to the differing levels of development in advanced and backward countries.

=== Skipping stages ===
For backward countries with remnants of primitive communist institutions, such as Russia, Marx and Engels developed a strategy that involved "skipping" the capitalist stage of development. They argued that the Russian obshchina (the peasant village commune with its system of common land ownership) could serve as a "strategic point of social regeneration" and a direct starting point for a communist course of development. Marx noted that Russia was not fated to follow the same path as Western Europe; if its revolution succeeded, the obshchina could allow it to "appropriate the positive results" of capitalism (such as technology and industry) without undergoing its "fatal vicissitudes". Engels was more cautious, insisting that such a transition would only be possible if the Russian revolution acted as a "signal for a proletarian revolution in the West", which could then provide Russia with the necessary material and technological support. This strategy was predicated on a mass peasant revolution, not a vanguard-led coup; Marx and Engels consistently rejected the elitist and conspiratorial models of Russian revolutionaries like Mikhail Bakunin and Sergey Nechayev, insisting that a revolution "can be made by a Nation", not by a party.

=== Legal revolution ===
For the most advanced capitalist countries with established democratic institutions (such as Great Britain, the United States, and, eventually, France), Marx and Engels began to envision a strategy of "legal revolution". The extension of the franchise and the creation of sovereign parliaments opened up the possibility for the working class to "achieve their ends by peaceful means". This was not a reformist strategy of gradual change, but a revolutionary one that aimed at the legal and peaceful conquest of political power by a class-conscious workers' party representing the majority of the population.

Marx and Engels remained pessimistic about the willingness of the bourgeoisie to abide by a democratic verdict. They warned that a legal electoral victory for the workers might be met with a "pro-slavery rebellion" by the ruling class. In such a case, the legal workers' government would be compelled to use force to suppress the "rebels against the 'lawful' power". The strategy, as Engels outlined it, was for the workers' party to "thrive far better on legal methods than on illegal methods and overthrow", forcing the ruling parties to "break through this fatal legality" themselves. The workers were to remain on the defensive, using violence only in response to illegal actions by the bourgeoisie, thus putting the workers in the "most favorable position" to make the revolution.

== The disappearance of the state ==
The final goal of the revolution, for Marx and Engels, was the creation of a classless society and, consequently, the disappearance of the state as a political institution. This ultimate objective was tied to their dual theory of the state. The two forms of the state—the parasitic bureaucracy and the coercive class instrument—were destined to disappear in different ways and at different times. Hunt outlines a three-stage process for the disappearance of the state.

The "parasite state"—the professional, bureaucratic apparatus alienated from society—would be transcended (aufgehoben) immediately by the revolution itself. In its place would be a system of radical democracy and popular self-administration, a "democracy without professionals". Inspired by Athenian democracy and exemplified by the Paris Commune, this new polity would eliminate the professional class of politicians, soldiers, and bureaucrats. Public functions would be performed by elected officials serving short terms, subject to instant recall, and receiving workmen's wages. This would mark the reabsorption of the alienated state back into society. The early ideal of "real democracy" was thus radically transformed in their mature work: it was now premised not on the reintegration of the lives of private individuals, but on the class dictatorship of the proletariat as the specific form of state required to achieve it. The material basis for this "deprofessionalisation" of public life was the transcendence of the division of labour in society as a whole, allowing individuals to develop multiple skills and rotate between different tasks, including administrative ones.

The second stage is the disappearance of the "dictatorship" of the proletariat. For Marx, any revolutionary government during a provisorium was a dictatorship, but this extralegal rule would end once a new, democratic constitution was established.

The final stage is the disappearance of the "class state"—the organized coercive power (police, army, prisons). It would be wielded by the proletarian majority during the transitional period to "crush the resistance of the bourgeoisie". However, as the economic foundations of class division were eliminated and class antagonisms faded, the need for this coercive apparatus would diminish. Engels famously argued that the state would "wither away" (absterben). It would not be "abolished", as the anarchists demanded, but would become obsolete as a "new generation reared in new, free social conditions is able to throw the entire lumber of the state on the scrap heap". The government of persons would be replaced by the administration of things and the direction of the processes of production. In the fully communist society, there would be no separate state institution and no organized coercion, as public order would be maintained by the "armed people" themselves and social harmony would make such force largely unnecessary.

== See also ==
- Democracy in Marxism
- Miliband–Poulantzas debate
