= Withering away of the state =

Concept in Marxism

The withering away of the state is a Marxist concept coined by Friedrich Engels referring to the expectation that, with the realization of socialism, the state will eventually become obsolete and cease to exist as society will be able to govern itself without the state and its coercive enforcement of the law.

== Origin of the phrase ==
The phrase stems from Friedrich Engels, who wrote in part 3, chapter 2 of Anti-Dühring (1878):

The interference of the state power in social relations becomes superfluous in one sphere after another, and then ceases of itself. The government of persons is replaced by the administration of things and the direction of the processes of production. The state is not "abolished", it withers away. (German: Der Staat wird nicht „abgeschafft“, er stirbt ab., lit. 'The state is not "abolished", it atrophies.')

A related quote from Engels comes from Origins of the Family, Private Property, and the State (1884):

The society which organizes production anew on the basis of free and equal association of the producers will put the whole state machinery where it will then belong—into the museum of antiquities, next to the spinning wheel and the bronze axe.

== Interpretations ==
Some trace the concept of the state withering away back to the early Karl Marx of the 1840s and to the socialist anarchist theorist Pierre-Joseph Proudhon. However, Marx's advocacy for the dictatorship of the proletariat and Proudhon's antagonism towards the state proved uncomfortable bedfellows, and the two thinkers parted company c. 1847. Proudhon's ideas on withering influenced the Paris Commune of 1871.

Vladimir Lenin who later expanded on the idea

Although Engels first introduced the terminology of "the withering away of the state", he attributed the underlying concept to Marx, and other Marxist theorists—including Vladimir Lenin (1870–1924)—would later expand on it. According to this concept of the withering away of the state, eventually a communist society will no longer require coercion to induce individuals to behave in a way that benefits the entire society. Such a society would occur after a temporary period of the dictatorship of the proletariat.

The idea of the communist society proceeds from the concept of the transformation of the state in a previous stage of society called socialism. Engels posits that—similar to the arguments made by Henri de Saint-Simon before him—in a socialist society public organization would become primarily concerned with technical issues such as the optimal allocation of resources and determination of production as opposed to drafting and enforcing laws and thus the traditional state functions would gradually become irrelevant and unnecessary for the functioning of society. Engels argued that the state transforms itself from a "government of people" to an "administration of things" and thus would not be a state in the traditional sense of the term.

This scenario depended on Marx's view of coercive power as a tool of those who own the means of production, i.e. certain social classes (the bourgeoisie) and the capitalist state. In a communist society, the social classes would disappear and the means of production would have no single owner, hence such a stateless society will no longer require law and a stateless communist society will develop.

The concept of the withering away of the state differentiates traditional Marxism from state socialism (which accepts the retention of the institution of the state) and anti-statist anarchism (which demands the immediate abolition of the state with no perceived need for any "temporary" post-revolutionary institution of the state).

In the Soviet Marxism of the Soviet Union, Lenin supported the idea of the withering away of the state as seen in his The State and Revolution (1917). Joseph Stalin's government mentioned it occasionally, but did not believe the world was yet in the advanced stage of development where the state could wither away. He believed that at least in the short term the state had to have enough power to strike back against those elements seeking to derail the ultimate victory of communism. The Stalin-era Soviet Union marginalized the notion of the withering of the state, as the state became more powerful and entrenched.

The Chinese Communist Party also officially subscribes to the eventual withering of the state. In 1949, Mao Zedong said that "elimination of classes, state power, and the Party is a path that all of humanity must take". In 1956, Mao said that "the Communist Party will one day be eliminated" and that "it would be great if they were eliminated one day. Our task is to hasten their elimination". At the Chengdu Conference in March 1958, Mao said: "First the classes are eliminated, then the state is eliminated, and then the nation perishes. This is true all over the world."

Niu Xianfeng and Li Ying of the School of Marxism of the Central Party School write that, according to Marxist theory, the withering away of the state will be marked by "return of state power to society and realizing self-management of individuals and autonomous management of society", leading to the establishment of an "association of free individuals". Wang Weiguang, President of the Chinese Academy of Social Sciences from 2013 to 2018 and member of the 18th CCP Central Committee, states that condition for the withering of the state is a "highly developed productive force" and the "establishment of a public ownership economic foundation" and that "only when the state's function of class oppression is no longer needed can the state wither away". He argues that the view that bourgeois states can also "wither away on their own" is a distortion of Marxism, noting Lenin opposed such views. He says only a state under the dictatorship of the proletariat that established a certain economic foundation can wither away on its own.

The Workers' Party of Korea, in contrast, rejects the withering away of the state. Kim Jong Il stated in 1992 that "preceding theory identified the essential difference between the government of the exploiting classes and socialist government as lying mainly in the difference between their class character, and it considered that a socialist state would wither away once class domination was unnecessary after a classless society was built". He calls this view "incompatible with the practice of socialist and communist construction". He instead said that the functions of the newly established socialist government would be "further intensified as the building of socialism and communism progresses" and that "this function will be needed in communist society as well". He concludes that "socialist power will never wither away" and "the matter of power will remain the most important matter not only at the stage of the socialist revolution but also during the whole historical period of socialist and communist construction".

== See also ==
- "From each according to his ability, to each according to his needs"
- Post-scarcity economy
- State failure
