= Nicos Poulantzas =

Greek-French Marxist sociologist (1936–1979)

- Born: 21 September 1936; Athens, Kingdom of Greece
- Died: 3 October 1979 (aged 43); Paris, France
- Political party: List: EDA (until 1966); KKE (1960–1968); KKE int. (from 1968)

Education
- Education: University of Athens (LL.B., 1957); LMU Munich; Heidelberg University; University of Paris (J.D., 1964)
- Doctoral advisor: Henri Batiffol; Michel Villey

Philosophical work
- Era: 20th-century philosophy
- Region: Western philosophy
- School: Continental philosophy Western Marxism; Structural Marxism
- Institutions: University of Paris VIII
- Main interests: Political philosophy
- Notable ideas: The relative autonomy of the capitalist state from the capitalist class Non-reduction of class relations to economic exploitation

Nicos Poulantzas (Greek: Νίκος Πουλαντζάς; 21 September 1936 – 3 October 1979) was a Greek-French Marxist political philosopher and sociologist. In the 1970s, he became a leading figure in the structuralist Marxist school of thought. He is best known for his theoretical work on the state, social class, fascism, and authoritarianism. His work was influential in critiquing traditional communist views and developing a sophisticated Marxist theory of the capitalist state.

Born in Greece, Poulantzas moved to France in 1960, where he spent the remainder of his life. Initially influenced by the existentialist Marxism of Jean-Paul Sartre, he later became associated with the structuralist school of Louis Althusser. His first major work, Political Power and Social Classes (1968), presented a structuralist theory of the state as relatively autonomous from the direct control of the capitalist class, serving instead as a "factor of cohesion" for the social formation. His subsequent work analysed exceptional forms of the state, such as in Fascism and Dictatorship (1970), and addressed contemporary class structures in Classes in Contemporary Capitalism (1974).

Poulantzas was a prominent figure in the "Eurocommunist" wing of European communism, and his theoretical work was closely tied to political strategy. He was an active member of the Communist Party of Greece (Interior) and engaged in debates on the "democratic road to socialism". In his final book, State, Power, Socialism (1978), he moved toward a relational theory of the state, defining it as the "material condensation of a relationship of forces between classes". This later work showed an engagement with the ideas of Michel Foucault, conceptualising the state as a strategic terrain rather than a monolithic entity. He died by suicide in Paris in 1979.

== Life ==
=== Early life and education ===
Nicos Poulantzas was born in Athens on 21 September 1936 to a well-established family. His father, Aristides Poulantzas, was a prominent professor of forensic graphology. Poulantzas demonstrated a precocious intellect, attending the experimental Peiramaticon Gymnasium attached to the University of Athens. He also studied at the local Institut Français, acquiring fluency in French.

In 1953, he entered the School of Law at Athens University. His decision to study law was not motivated by a desire for a legal career, but rather because it was the only way within the prestigious university to pursue his interests in philosophy and the social sciences. During his student years, he was broadly sympathetic to Marxism and became involved in "broad left" politics. He belonged to a student organisation loosely affiliated with the clandestine Communist Party of Greece (KKE) and participated in the United Democratic Left (EDA), which functioned as a legal front for the KKE. The main issue around which he agitated was the Cyprus question, a nationalist cause with broad popular support. He was briefly arrested in 1955 for his participation in a demonstration on this topic. After graduating with an "excellent" grade in 1957, he served his compulsory military service in the Greek navy, working in the translation service in Athens and later in Crete.

=== Move to France and academic career ===
After completing his military service, Poulantzas moved to West Germany in 1960 for postgraduate work, initially in Munich. However, within a month he wrote to his father that the influence of Nazi ideas was too strong for him to stay, and he relocated to Paris to continue his studies. In Paris, he quickly secured a teaching assistantship (charge de cours) in the philosophy of law at the Panthéon-Sorbonne University. He completed a postgraduate thesis on "The Rebirth of Natural Law in Germany" in 1961, followed by his doctoral dissertation, Nature des Choses et Droit ('The Nature of Things and Law'), in 1964.

During this period, Poulantzas became deeply involved in French intellectual circles, particularly with the group around Jean-Paul Sartre and Simone de Beauvoir's journal, Les Temps Modernes. From 1964, he became a regular contributor to the journal on law, politics, and philosophy. In 1963, he met the novelist Annie Leclerc; they married on 6 December 1966, and their daughter, Ariane, was born in 1970. His academic career progressed with an appointment at the Centre national de la recherche scientifique from 1966 to 1972.

=== Political activism and intellectual shifts ===
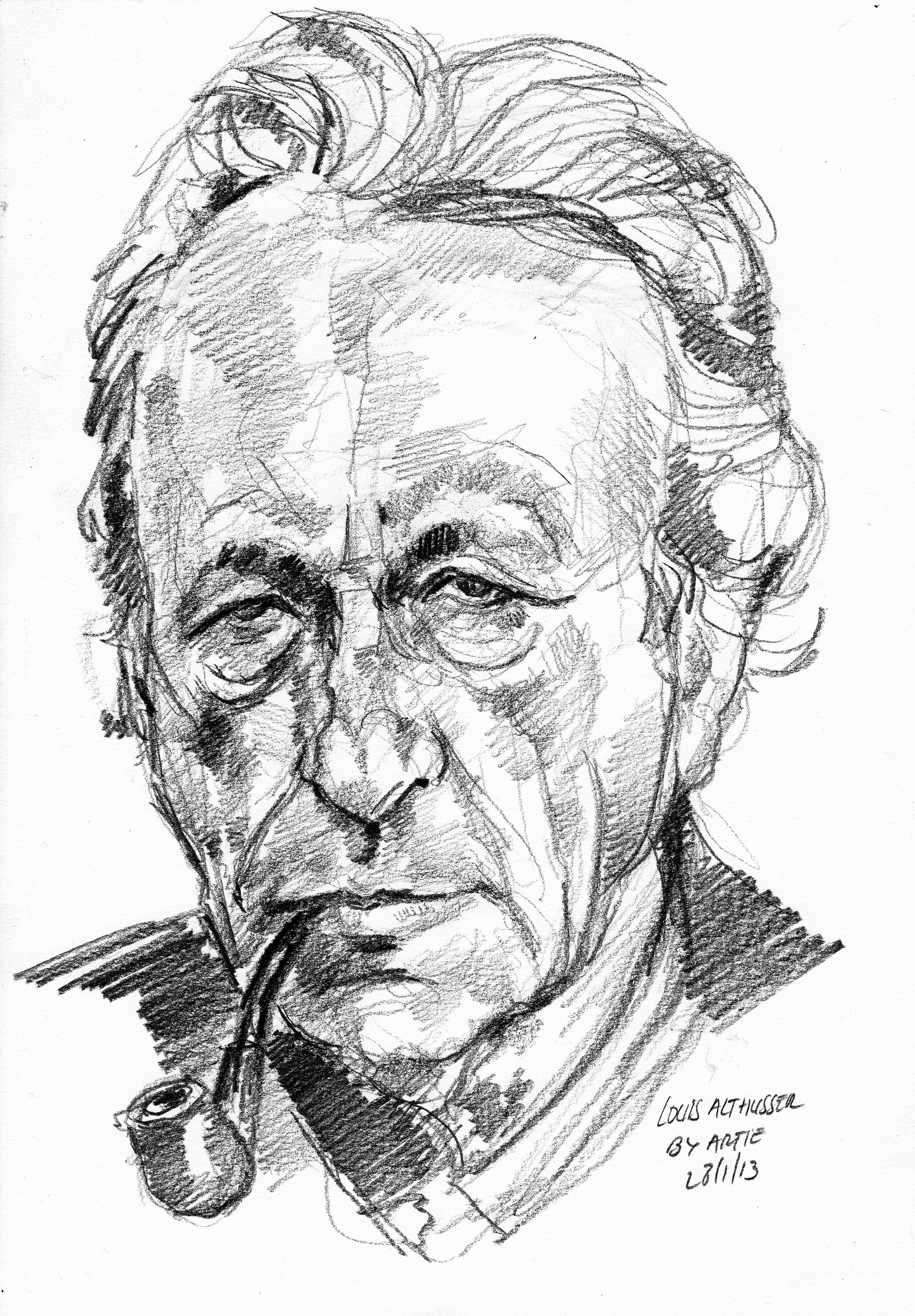
Louis Althusser, a major influence on Poulantzas

Poulantzas joined the KKE in Paris around 1961 and remained active in the EDA until 1966. His political and theoretical work began to shift away from the existentialist Marxism of his early years. He was increasingly influenced by the work of Louis Althusser and the structuralist Marxist school, as well as by Italian Marxists such as Antonio Gramsci and Lucio Colletti.

A decisive event in his political mobilisation was the military coup in Greece in 1967. Poulantzas became a founding member and consistent activist in the anti-dictatorial committee of Greeks in Paris. The Soviet invasion of Czechoslovakia in 1968 led to a split in the KKE. Poulantzas sided with the anti-Stalinist, Eurocommunist faction, which became known as the KKE (Interior). From this point until his death, he developed his political views within the ranks of this party, albeit often from a position to its left.

His major work, Political Power and Social Classes (Pouvoir politique et classes sociales), appeared just before the May 1968 events in France and established his reputation as a major state theorist. His 1969 critique of Ralph Miliband's The State in Capitalist Society initiated the Miliband–Poulantzas debate, which brought him to prominence in the English-speaking world. Following the May 1968 events, he was invited to teach sociology at the experimental University of Paris VIII at Vincennes, an institution created to decentralise and modernise the French university system.

=== Later years and death ===
Throughout the 1970s, Poulantzas's work focused on analysing exceptional states, imperialism, and the strategy for a democratic transition to socialism. The collapse of the military dictatorships in Southern Europe—Greece (1974), Portugal (1974), and Spain (after 1975)—provided a concrete context for his theoretical work. He analysed these transitions in The Crisis of the Dictatorships (1975), in which he began to develop a relational theory of the state as a field of struggle. Following the fall of the Greek junta, he returned to his homeland, contributed to Greek political life through journalism, and lectured at the Panteion University in Athens.

In his later years in Paris, he engaged critically with the work of Michel Foucault and the Nouveaux Philosophes. He became active in the French left's struggle for unity, particularly in the context of the Union de la Gauche, and helped form the "Mélusine" group of intellectuals to foster debate across the left. His final book, State, Power, Socialism (1978), further developed his relational theory of the state, engaging with Foucault's concepts of power while maintaining a Marxist framework.

Nicos Poulantzas died by suicide in Paris on 3 October 1979, at the age of 43.

== Work ==
=== Influences ===
Poulantzas's originality lies in his unique synthesis of three distinct intellectual traditions within a Marxist framework: French philosophy, Italian Marxism, and Romano-German law.

- French philosophy: This was a constant reference point throughout his career. He began under the influence of Jean-Paul Sartre's existentialism, from which he derived his early relational concepts and his "internal-external" dialectical method. He then moved to the structuralism of Louis Althusser, which provided the epistemological justification for his "regional theory" of the state and his critique of humanism and historicism. In his final phase, he engaged critically with Michel Foucault, incorporating his relational concept of power, analysis of "disciplines," and idea of the state as a strategic terrain, while rejecting Foucault's neglect of class and the repressive role of the state.
- Italian Marxism: The influence of Italian political thought, particularly that of Antonio Gramsci, is central to Poulantzas's work on political strategy. From Gramsci, he adopted and developed key concepts such as hegemony, the power bloc, and the distinction between political and civil society (which he later re-formulated). His later move toward a left-Eurocommunist strategy was also influenced by contemporary debates in the Italian Communist Party, particularly the "Ingrao left".
- Romano-German law: Poulantzas's legal training provided a durable foundation for his analysis of the state. His entire theory of the "normal" capitalist state is built on the premise that it is a Rechtsstaat (a state based on the rule of law). Concepts such as legal sovereignty, the separation of powers, and the distinction between public and private law are central to his account of the state's institutional structure. His analysis of the state's unity was influenced by the legal positivism of Hans Kelsen, even as he criticised its philosophical underpinnings.

=== Early work: existentialism and law ===
Poulantzas's early work, culminating in his 1964 doctoral dissertation Nature des Choses et Droit ('The Nature of Things and Law'), was situated within an existentialist-Marxist framework heavily influenced by Jean-Paul Sartre, Lucien Goldmann, and Georg Lukács. In this period, his primary philosophical project was to synthesise existentialism and Marxism to transcend the dualism between fact and value, particularly in the philosophy of law. He drew on the German legal concept of the "nature of things" (Natur der Sache), but reinterpreted it through French existentialism to argue for a dialectical unity of fact and value immanent in human action.

His analysis was based on a humanist ontology of "man-in-the-world", who is always in association with others. He argued that this social existence implies a unity of fact and value, as human beings exist and act through values embodied in projects. He combined this ontology with a Marxist sociology of society as a structural totality of base and superstructure, arguing that law's specific form is determined in the last instance by the economic level, mediated by the Weltanschauung (worldview) of the dominant class. Poulantzas later renounced this early work, criticising it for its "historicism and humanism". However, elements of this period, particularly his use of a legal framework to analyse the state and his "internal-external" dialectical method, continued to influence his later theories.

=== Theory of the capitalist state ===
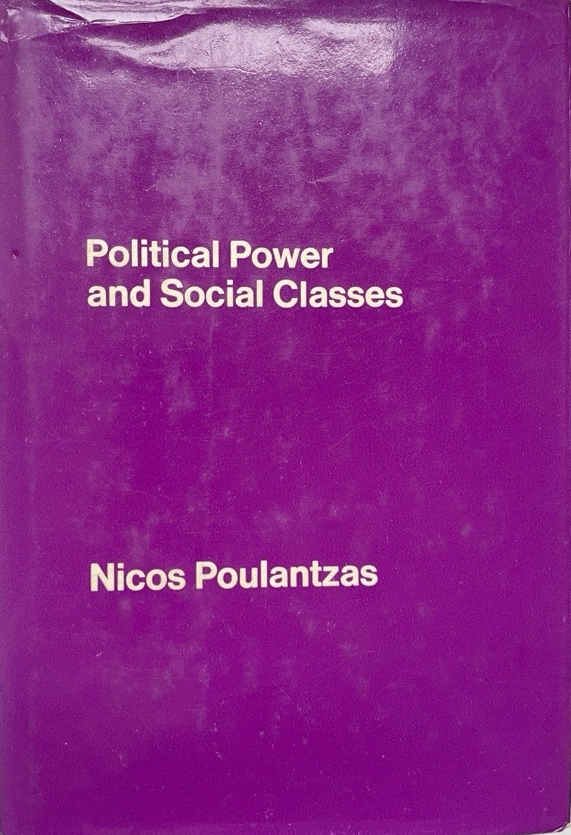
Cover of the first English edition of Poulantzas's Political Power and Social Classes (1968)

Poulantzas is best known for his theory of the capitalist state, which he developed from a structuralist Marxist perspective, primarily in Political Power and Social Classes (1968). He rejected both instrumentalist views of the state as a simple tool of the ruling class and theories of the state as a neutral subject representing a general will.

==== Relative autonomy and the power bloc ====
Poulantzas's central concept is the "relative autonomy" of the state. He argued that the capitalist state must be relatively autonomous from the particular interests of individual capitalist fractions in order to organise the long-term, general political interests of the capitalist class as a whole. This autonomy is structurally guaranteed by the institutional separation of the political and economic spheres in capitalism. Unlike in pre-capitalist modes of production, where economic exploitation involved direct political and ideological coercion, capitalism is based on the formally free exchange of labour-power. This allows the state to appear as a separate, public entity representing the unity of the nation, distinct from the private sphere of economic competition.

The state's function is to act as the "factor of social cohesion" in a class-divided society. It achieves this by performing two complementary tasks:

1. It disorganises the dominated classes by constituting them as individual "citizens" rather than as a collective class. This "isolation effect" prevents the political organisation of the working class and other subordinate groups.
2. It organises the dominant class. Since the capitalist class is itself divided into competing fractions (e.g., industrial, commercial, and financial capital), the state must organise them into a coherent political alliance, which Poulantzas, following Gramsci, called the "power bloc".

The power bloc is unified under the leadership of one "hegemonic fraction", which manages the negotiation of interests among the dominant classes and secures the consent of the dominated classes through material concessions and ideological means. The state, therefore, is not a monolithic entity but is traversed by contradictions between different class fractions, which are reflected in struggles between different branches and apparatuses of the state (e.g., between the legislature and the executive).

==== Exceptional states and authoritarian statism ====
Poulantzas distinguished between the "normal" form of the capitalist state—the bourgeois-democratic republic—and "exceptional" states like fascism and military dictatorships. Normal states correspond to periods of stable bourgeois hegemony, where domination is exercised primarily through consent and constitutionalised violence. Exceptional states emerge in response to a profound political crisis—a "crisis of hegemony"—where no class or fraction can assert its leadership through normal democratic means. These regimes suspend democratic institutions and rely more heavily on open repression.

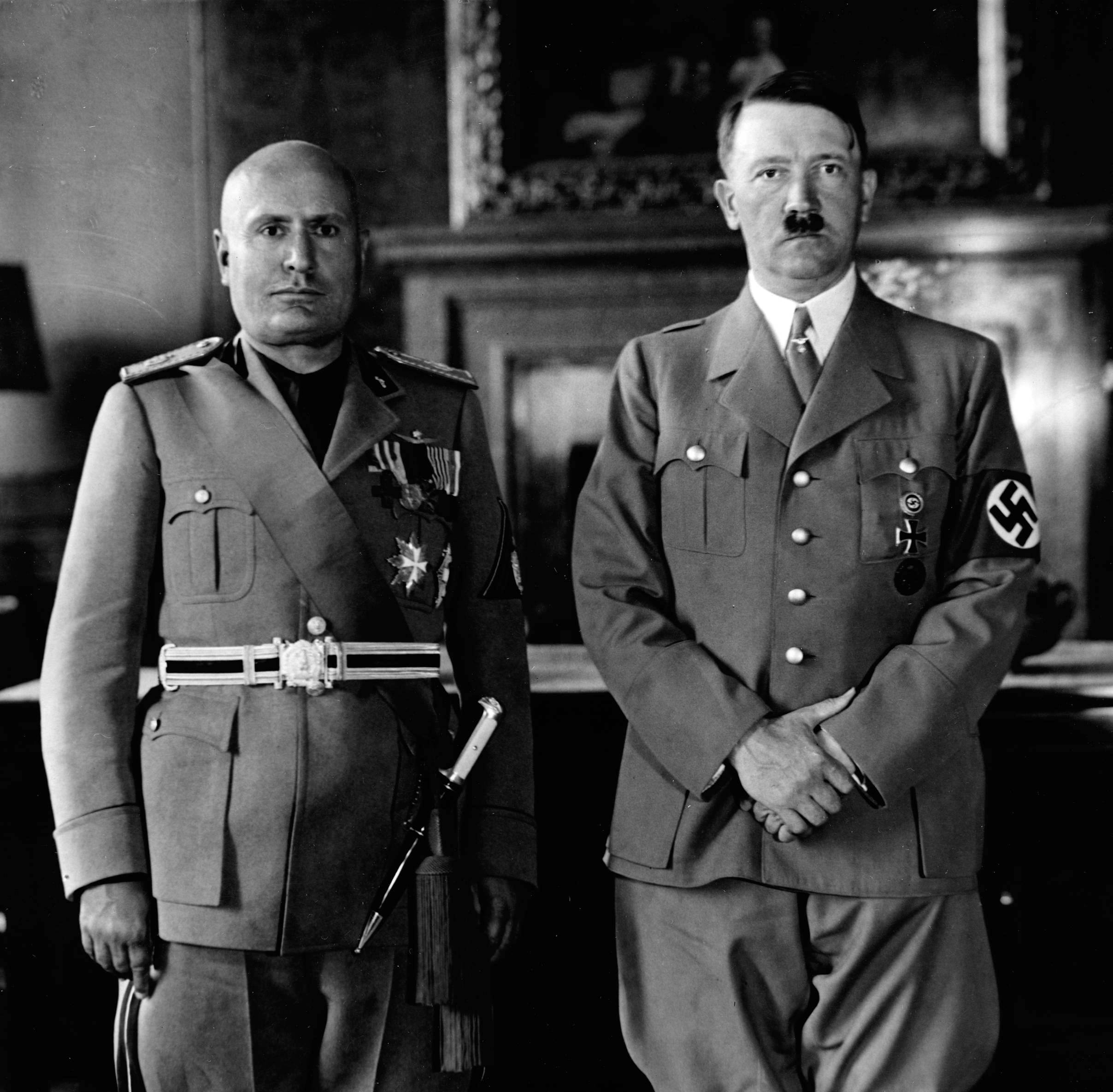
Benito Mussolini and Adolf Hitler, whose fascist regimes Poulantzas analyzed

In Fascism and Dictatorship (1970), Poulantzas analysed fascism in Italy and Germany as an exceptional state that arose during the transition to monopoly capitalism. He argued that fascism served the interests of monopoly capital by smashing the labour movement and reorganising the power bloc under its hegemony. However, he rejected simplistic accounts, stressing that fascism was not a mere tool but had a specific mass base in the petty bourgeoisie, whose revolt it mobilised and whose ideology it initially reflected. He contrasted the "flexible" fascist regimes, with their mass party and complex ideological apparatuses, with the more "brittle" military dictatorships of Southern Europe, which lacked a popular base and were more prone to internal collapse.

In his later work, Poulantzas developed the concept of "authoritarian statism" to describe the contemporary form of the state in advanced capitalist societies. He defined it as "intensified state control over every sphere of socio-economic life combined with radical decline of the institutions of political democracy". Key features included a shift of power from the legislature to the executive, the decline of political parties in favour of direct administration and mass media, an erosion of the rule of law, and the growth of parallel power networks alongside official state structures. For Poulantzas, this was not an exceptional state but a new normal form, emerging in response to the permanent economic and political crises of monopoly capitalism.

=== Social classes and ideology ===
Poulantzas rejected economism in his analysis of social class. He argued that classes are not defined solely by their position in the economic relations of production. Instead, they are the result of an "ensemble of structures" and their relations at the economic, political, and ideological levels. In his later work, he refined this by arguing that the relations of production themselves have three organically interrelated moments:

1. Economic: ownership (real economic control over the means of production) and possession (control over the labour process).
2. Political: relations of supervision and subordination within production (e.g., "factory despotism").
3. Ideological: the division between mental and manual labour.

This framework allowed him to distinguish the working class from the "new petty bourgeoisie" (e.g., technicians, supervisors, civil servants). Although salaried, the latter are not part of the proletariat because they perform political and ideological roles of supervision and apply the ideology of mental labour over manual labour.

Poulantzas also developed the Althusserian concept of Ideological State Apparatuses (ISAs)—such as the family, education system, churches, and media—which function primarily through ideology to secure social cohesion. However, he criticised Althusser for being too abstract and formal, arguing that ISAs are not unified by a single ruling ideology but are terrains of intense ideological class struggle. Different classes and fractions can have footholds within various ISAs, making them sites of contradiction within the state system.

=== Relational theory of the state ===
In his final book, State, Power, Socialism (1978), Poulantzas moved towards a relational theory of the state, increasingly influenced by Michel Foucault. He abandoned the rigid Althusserian framework of distinct economic, political, and ideological "regions" and instead emphasised their interpenetration within the social relations of production.

His key proposition became that the state is a social relation, just as capital is a social relation. This means the state is not a "thing" or a subject with its own power, but is the "material condensation of a relationship of forces between classes". State power is the power of class forces acting in and through the state. The state apparatus itself is a "strategic terrain"—a complex, contradictory ensemble of institutions that crystallises past struggles and provides a field of action for ongoing ones. Power is not located in the state but is exercised across a multitude of "micro-powers" within and outside the state apparatus. The overall political line of the state emerges as the result of the collision of these micro-policies and strategies, rather than being the execution of a coherent plan by a unified ruling class.

This relational approach had significant implications for socialist strategy. Poulantzas rejected the Leninist model of smashing the state from the outside in a situation of "dual power". He also rejected a social-democratic strategy of simply occupying existing institutions. Instead, he advocated a "democratic road to socialism" that combined struggles within the state to exploit its internal contradictions with the expansion of new forms of direct, rank-and-file democracy (councils, self-management bodies) outside the state. The goal was to radically transform the state through a "long series of ruptures and breaks".

== Legacy and influence ==
Bob Jessop has described Nicos Poulantzas as "the single most important and influential Marxist theorist of the state and politics in the postwar period". His work was crucial in moving Marxist theory beyond the simplistic instrumentalist and economistic models of the state that had dominated orthodox Marxism. In addressing the nature of bourgeois democracy, the strategy for socialist transition in the West, and the institutional forms of a democratic socialism, he tackled the key questions left unresolved by the tradition of Western Marxism.

His concept of the relative autonomy of the state became a cornerstone of Marxist political theory in the 1970s and 1980s, providing a framework for analysing the state's role in managing class conflicts and organising bourgeois hegemony. The Miliband–Poulantzas debate structured much of the academic discussion on the Marxist theory of the state for over a decade. His later relational theory, which defined the state as a strategic terrain and the condensation of a class relationship, anticipated and influenced the "strategic-relational approach" in state theory.

Poulantzas's work was also politically significant. It provided a sophisticated theoretical justification for the emerging Eurocommunist strategy of a democratic, pluralist road to socialism. His insistence on combining representative democracy with forms of direct, rank-and-file democracy continues to inform debates on socialist strategy. Jessop concludes that Poulantzas was an "exceptional Western Marxist" because, unlike many of his contemporaries, he consistently developed and rectified his theoretical positions in the course of concrete political analysis and engagement with urgent strategic problems in Greece and France.

== Major works ==
- Poulantzas, Nicos. Political Power and Social Classes. NLB, 1973 (orig. 1968). ISBN 0-86091-705-3
- Poulantzas, Nicos. Fascism and Dictatorship: The Third International and the Problem of Fascism. NLB, 1974 (orig. 1970). ISBN 0902308858
- Poulantzas, Nicos. Classes in Contemporary Capitalism. NLB, 1975 (orig. 1973). ISBN 0902308068
- Poulantzas, Nicos. The Crisis of the Dictatorships: Portugal, Greece, Spain. Humanities Press, 1976. ISBN 0902308777
- Poulantzas, Nicos. State, Power, Socialism. NLB, 1978. ISBN 086091013X
- Poulantzas, Nicos. The Poulantzas Reader: Marxism, Law and the State, ed. J. Martin. Verso, 2008. ISBN 9781844672004
