= Marxist Group (Germany) =

Marxist Group Marxistische Gruppe
- Founded: 1974
- Dissolved: 1991
- Newspaper: MSZ - Gegen die Kosten der Freiheit (Opposing the Costs of Liberty); Marxistische Arbeiterzeitung (Marxist Workers’ Newspaper)
- Membership (1991): 10,000
- Ideology: Marxism

The Marxist Group (German: Marxistische Gruppe, MG) was one of the largest communist organization of the "New Left" in West Germany. The program of the MG focused on the abolition of private property and of the state altogether. The group aspired to have the free-market economy replaced by social planning according to the specific needs that were present.

The MG emerged from the so-called "Red Cells" (Ger.: Roten Zellen), which arose in the German student movement in 1968. The MG was properly formed in the early 1970s. The MG published among other things the magazine MSZ - Gegen die Kosten der Freiheit (Marxistische Streit- und Zeitschrift; Marxist Argument and Magazine - Opposing the Costs of Liberty), the Marxistische Arbeiterzeitung (Marxist Workers’ Newspaper), various university newspapers, as well as the book series Resultate (Results), Abweichende Meinungen (Dissenting Views) and Kritik der bürgerlichen Wissenschaft (Critique of Bourgeois Science). It is thought to have had up to 10,000 members. Local associations of the MG also existed in Austria.

The organization was monitored by the intelligence office (Ger.: Verfassungsschutz; Federal Office for the Protection of the Constitution) and was rated "left-wing extremist". According to data collected by the office, numerous members of the MG — particularly in Bavaria — were dismissed from civil service, and some private employers were informed about MG members and asked to dismiss them. In May 1991, the MG announced its dissolution. The reason it stated was that it was expecting intensified reprisals against its members following the appearance of an intelligence office brochure about the group. The party's newspapers were discontinued, but corresponding journalistic work was continued by the publishing house GegenStandpunkt-Verlag and the journal GegenStandpunkt (Opposing Viewpoint).

== The communist theory of the Marxist Group ==
=== Critique of Leninism and State Socialism ===
The MG never based itself on "Marxism-Leninism," and sharply criticized the interpretation of Karl Marx’ theory that was forged by Lenin and handed down by communist parties. It started out from the new discussion about Marx' Capital that arose in the 1960s.

On this basis, the MG did not regard the phenomena of bourgeois society as the result of the doings of individual capitalists or factions of capital, but saw capitalists and wageworkers only as "character masks" of a relationship of exploitation between capital and wage labor that is inherent in bourgeois society, i.e., based on general commodity production and the commodity character of labor power. While, for example, the German Communist Party with its theory of "state monopoly capitalism" criticized the bourgeois state in Germany primarily for letting "monopoly capital" directly influence politics in all kinds of ways and thereby thwart and corrode the at least partly "progressive-democratic" character of the political order formulated in the constitution, the MG rejected such criticisms as "idealistic", because according to its analysis, a bourgeois state is fundamentally nothing other than an "ideal collective capitalist" (Friedrich Engels), quite independent of the actions of individual capitals, and exists for no other purpose than to safeguard the private ownership of the means of production and to guarantee the basic conditions for capital accumulation with the aid of the state monopoly on the use of force. When the DKP and similar groups appealed to "democratic forces" to form alliances against right-wing and fascist tendencies, the MG accordingly rejected this as assuming democracy has nothing but humane purposes that miss the point of its supposed reason for being. After all, it claimed, it was completely normal democratic business both to "sort human material into useful and useless" and to wage war to assert the demand that all resources be transformed into objects of capital accumulation, while fascism was especially consistent in realizing the democratic ideal of a national community willing to make sacrifices for the success of the state purpose. Further, democratic pluralism institutionalized the citizens’ abstracting from their needs and interests; instead of disputing their antagonistic interests, citizens acknowledged their legitimacy and argued about alternative state policy as reflected in the various political parties. The MG was also sharply polemical about the trade unions, since by fighting for higher wages, they expressed nothing other than the workers’ fundamental agreement with the capitalistic use of their labor power.

The MG denied the Leninist theory of imperialism as "the highest stage of capitalism," in which capitalism had passed into a state of "rot" and decline — since capitalism was not to be criticized for working badly, but for working far too well. The MG's understanding of Marx focusing on "Capital," the Critique of Political Economy, disregarded the elements in the thinking of Marx and Engels involving the philosophy of history, which "Marxism-Leninism" developed into a "world view" ("dialectical and historical materialism").

=== Communism ===
The aims of the MG could be inferred indirectly from its critique of the states promoting "real socialism." The MG accused these states of not having consistently overcome commodity production and money in favor of a planned production of use-values, but instead invented the nonsense of planning with the help of commodity-money "levers" (a term popular in Soviet economics textbooks); the contradiction between planning and the acceptance of commodity-money relations was the cause of the inconsistencies and malfunctions in the economies of state socialism. It can be concluded that the MG assumed that after a revolution based on a correct understanding of Marxist theory and the abolishment of money, supplying the population with use-values could be managed simply through a division of labor.
