= Capitalist state =

Concept of the state in a capitalist system

The capitalist state is the state within capitalist socioeconomic systems. Often used interchangeably with the concept of the modern state, this concept encompasses the functions of the state as well as the form of organization that it takes. Despite their common functions, there are many different sociological characteristics recognized as aspects of capitalist states.

The primary functions of the capitalist state are to provide a legal framework and infrastructural framework conducive to business enterprise and the accumulation of capital. Different normative theories exist on the necessary and appropriate function of the state in a capitalist economy, with proponents of laissez-faire favoring a state limited to the provision of public goods and safeguarding private property rights while proponents of interventionism stress the importance of regulation, intervention and macroeconomic stabilization for providing a favorable environment for the accumulation of capital and business.

Thus, thinkers in the Marxist tradition often refer to the capitalist state as the dictatorship of the bourgeoisie and liberal democracy as bourgeois democracy. Thinkers in the instrumental Marxist tradition stress the role of policymakers and political elites sharing a common business or class background, leading to their decisions reflecting their class interest. This is differentiated from more contemporary notions of state capture by specific business interests for the benefit of those specific businesses and not the ruling class or capitalist system as a whole, which is variously referred to as crony capitalism or corporatocracy.

According to Dylan John Riley, Nicos Poulantzas argued that "all capitalist States had the dual task of preventing the political organization of the dominated classes, and of organizing the dominant class".

== See also ==
- Big government
- Communist state
- Patriarchy
- Socialist state
