= Jack Amariglio =

North American heterodox economist (born 1951)

Jack L. Amariglio
- Born: April 6, 1951 (age 75)

Academic background
- Education: Thomas Jefferson High School (Brooklyn) (1969); City College of New York (B.A., History, 1973); University of Massachusetts (Ph.D., Economics 1984)
- Influences: Marx; Nietzsche; Althusser; Foucault; Richard D. Wolff; Stephen Resnick; Gibson-Graham

Academic work
- School or tradition: Marxian economics
- Institutions: Earlham College (1978-80); Franklin and Marshall College (1980-84); Merrimack College (1984-present)
- Notable ideas: Marxian economics; economic methodology; class analysis

Jack L. Amariglio (born April 6, 1951) is a North American heterodox economist. He is well known for his work on economic history, class analysis, and (with David F. Ruccio) on economic methodology and postmodernism in economics.

== Biography ==
Amariglio was born and raised in the East New York section of Brooklyn, where he graduated from Thomas Jefferson High School (Brooklyn). He earned a B.A. in history from the City College of New York in 1973. He received his Ph.D. in 1984 from the University of Massachusetts Amherst. His dissertation was titled "Economic History and the Theory of Primitive Socio-Economic Development".

In 1988, Amariglio joined efforts with a group of colleagues to launch Rethinking Marxism, an academic journal that aims to create a platform for rethinking and developing Marxian concepts and theories within economics as well as other fields of social inquiry. He served as the founding editor of the journal until 1997 and continues to serve as a member of both the editorial as well as the advisory boards of the journal.

As a graduate student employee at the University of Massachusetts Amherst, he was instrumental in the institution of Economics Graduate Student Organization (EGSO), as a democratically run collective body of graduate students. EGSO, to this day, serves as a forum and representative body of graduate students and distributes the teaching assignments to graduate students in an egalitarian manner.

== Publications ==
=== Books ===
- Jack Amariglio, Joseph Childers, and Stephen Cullenberg (editors). Sublime Economy: On the Intersection of Art and Economics, (Routledge, New York, 2009).
- David F. Ruccio and Jack Amariglio. Postmodern Moments in Modern Economics, (Princeton University Press, Princeton, 2003).
- Stephen Cullenberg, Jack Amariglio, and David F. Ruccio (editors). Postmodernism, Economics, and Knowledge, (Routledge, New York, 2001).

=== Selected articles ===
- “Subjectivity, Class, and Marx’s ‘Forms of the Commune’”. Rethinking Marxism, Vol. 22, no. 3 (25 August 2010). This is part of a special issue on “Communes and Commons” with contributions by Toni Negri, Michael Hardt, Etienne Balibar, and others.
- “Kitsch as Kitsch Can, or Can’t: An Introduction to a Symposium on Kitsch, Class, and Political Aesthetics.” Rethinking Marxism, Vol. 22, no. 1 (January 2010).
- “Karl Marx and Ethics” (with Y. M. Madra). In Handbook of Economics and Ethics, ed. by I. van Staveren and J. Peil, Edward Elgar, 2009.
- “Tracing the Economic: Modern Art’s Construction of Economic Value,” In Sublime Economy: On the Intersection of Art and Economics, eds. J. Amariglio, J. Childers, and S. Cullenberg. Routledge, 2009.
- “From Wall to Fence (and Pillar to Post): The Politicized Aesthetics of Divided Territories.” Rethinking Marxism, Vol. 16, no. 3 (July 2004).
- “Give the Ghost a Chance! A Comrade’s Shadowy Addendum,” In The Question of the Gift, ed. M. Osteen. Routledge, 2002.
- "Modern Economics: The Case of the Disappearing Body?" Cambridge Journal of Economics, Vol. 26, no. 1 (January 2002).
- "From Unity to Dispersion: The Body in Modern Economics" (with D. Ruccio). In Postmodernism, Economics, and Knowledge, eds. S. Cullenberg, J. Amariglio, and D. Ruccio, Routledge, 2001.
- “Writing in Thirds: Comments on Dow, Klamer, and McCloskey”. In Postmodernism, Economics, and Knowledge, eds. S. Cullenberg, J. Amariglio, and D. Ruccio, Routledge, 2001.
- "The Transgressive Knowledge of 'Ersatz Economics'" (with D. Ruccio). In What Do Economists Know?: New Economics of Knowledge/New Knowledges of Economics, ed. R. Garnett, Routledge, 1999.
- "Literary/Cultural 'Economies', Economic Discourse, and the Question of Marxism" (with D. Ruccio). In The New Economic Criticism, eds. M. Woodmansee and M. Osteen, Routledge, 1999.
- "Poststructuralism." In The Handbook of Economic Methodology, eds. J. Davis, D. Wade Hands, and U. Maki, Edward Elgar Publishing, 1998.
- "The (Dis)Orderly Process of Capitalist Competition" (with D. Ruccio). In Marxian Economics: A Reappraisal, Volume 1, ed. R. Bellofiore, Macmillan, 1998.
- "'The Good, the Bad, and the Different': Reflections on Economic and Aesthetic Value" (with J. Graham and D. Ruccio). In The Value of Culture, ed. A Klamer, Amsterdam University Press, 1996.
- "Nondeterminist Marxism: The Birth of a Postmodern Tradition in Economics (with A. Callari, S. Resnick, D. Ruccio, and R. Wolff). In Beyond Neoclassical Economics: Heterodox Approaches to Economic Theory, ed. F. Foldvary, Edward Elgar, Ltd., 1996.
- "Keynes, Postmodernism, and Uncertainty" (with D. Ruccio). In Keynes, Knowledge, and Uncertainty, eds. J. Hillard and S. Dow, Edward Elgar, Ltd., 1995.
- "Postmodernism, Marxism, and the Critique of Modern Economics" (long version) (with David Ruccio). Rethinking Marxism, Vol. 7, no. 3, Fall 1994. Also published in Why Economists Disagree: An Introduction to the Alternative Schools of Thought, ed. D. L. Prychitko, State University of New York Press, 1997.
- "Marxian Value Theory and the Problem of the Subject: The Role of Commodity Fetishism," (with A. Callari). In Fetishism as Cultural Discourse, eds. E. Apter and W. Pietz, Ithaca: Cornell University Press, 1993. Also published in Rethinking Marxism, Vol. 2, no. 3 (Fall 1989).
- "Marxist Historians and the Question of Class in the French Revolution," (with B. Norton), History and Theory, Vol. 30, no. 1, Spring 1991.
- "Division and Difference in the 'Discipline' of Economics," (with S. Resnick and R. Wolff), Critical Inquiry, Vol. 17, no. 1, Autumn 1990. Also published in Knowledges: Historical and Critical Studies in Disciplinarity, eds. E. Messer-Davidow, D. R. Shumway, and D. J. Sylvan, University Press of Virginia, 1993, and in Social Scientist 19 (March–April 1991). Also published in New Departures in Marxian Theory, ed. by S. A. Resnick and R. D. Wolff, Routledge 2006.
- "Economics as a Postmodern Discourse," in Economics as Discourse, ed. Warren Samuels, Kluwer Academic Publishing, 1990.
- "Analytical Marxism: A Critical Overview," (with A. Callari and S. Cullenberg), Review of Social Economy, Vol. 47, no. 4, Winter 1989. Also published in Social Scientist 19 (January–February 1991), and in Critical Assessments in Marxist Economics, ed. J. Wood, Routledge, 1996.
- "The Body, Economic Discourse and Power: An Economist's Introduction to Foucault." History of Political Economy, Vol. 20, no. 4, Winter 1988.
- "Class, Power, and Culture," (with S. Resnick and R. Wolff), in Marxism and the Interpretation of Culture, eds. L. Grossberg and C. Nelson, University of Illinois Press, 1987.
- "Marxism Against Economic Science: Althusser's Legacy," in Research in Political Economy, Vol 10, ed. Paul Zarembka, JAI Press, 1987.

== See also ==
- Paul Hirst
- Barry Hindess
- J. K. Gibson-Graham
- Deirdre McCloskey
- Stephen A. Resnick
- Richard D. Wolff
