= The Theory of Capitalist Development =

1942 book by Paul Sweezy

- Cover of the first edition
- Author: Paul Sweezy
- Language: English
- Subject: Labor theory of value
- Publisher: Monthly Review Press
- Publication date: 1942
- Publication place: United States
- Media type: Print (Hardcover and Paperback)
- Pages: 398
- ISBN: 978-0853450795

The Theory of Capitalist Development is a 1942 book by the Marxian economist Paul Sweezy on the labor theory of value.

== Summary ==
The book is divided into four sections:

1. Value and Surplus Value
2. The Accumulation Process
3. Crisis and Depression
4. Imperialism

The piece begins by discussing the use of abstraction in Marx's works. Beginning chapters are devoted to the concept of labor, including the qualitative and quantitative ideas about labor in the Marxist view. Sweezy continues to outline the Marxian concepts of both the labor theory of Value and surplus value, as well as covers the role of supply and demand. Reproduction schemes are introduced and used to outline the extraction of surplus value and to criticize the traditional, albeit limited, Marxian solution to the Transformation problem. Sweezy develops his own method to solving it, while attempting to remain close to the original Marxian version. He later discusses the concept of the reserve army of labor, and its tendency to reduce wages. The larger focus of the third section, Crisis and Depression, is the theory of under-consumption. The interpretations of Eduard Bernstein, Rudolph Hilferding, Karl Kautsky and others theories of capitalist crises are discussed. The notion of Chronic Depression is criticized as Sweezy expands and writes about the role of the state in the capitalist economy. The section is further devoted to the analysis of capitalism under monopoly conditions. Sweezy argues that the development of monopolies arises out of the centralization of capital; furthermore monopolies provide less goods at higher consumer costs. Having conquered the domestic markets, monopolies, with state support, attempt to expand markets to less-developed countries through Imperialism. The last section covers the role of the capitalist state as an economic instrument, the exportation of markets, and subsequent developments of anti-tariff “free traders”, nationalism, racism, and “Wars of Redivision” in which countries fight for colonial possessions in order to further the interests of capital.

== Reception ==
The political scientist David McLellan called Sweezy's work the best modern continuation of Marx's economic ideas. The Marxist theorist Ernest Mandel accused Sweezy of several misunderstandings of Marx, including confusing prices of production and market prices, a mistake he saw as a result of Sweezy's employment of the work of Ladislaus von Bortkiewicz, a critic of Marx.

== See also ==
- Capital: Critique of Political Economy
