= Richard D. Wolff =

American Marxian economist (born 1942)

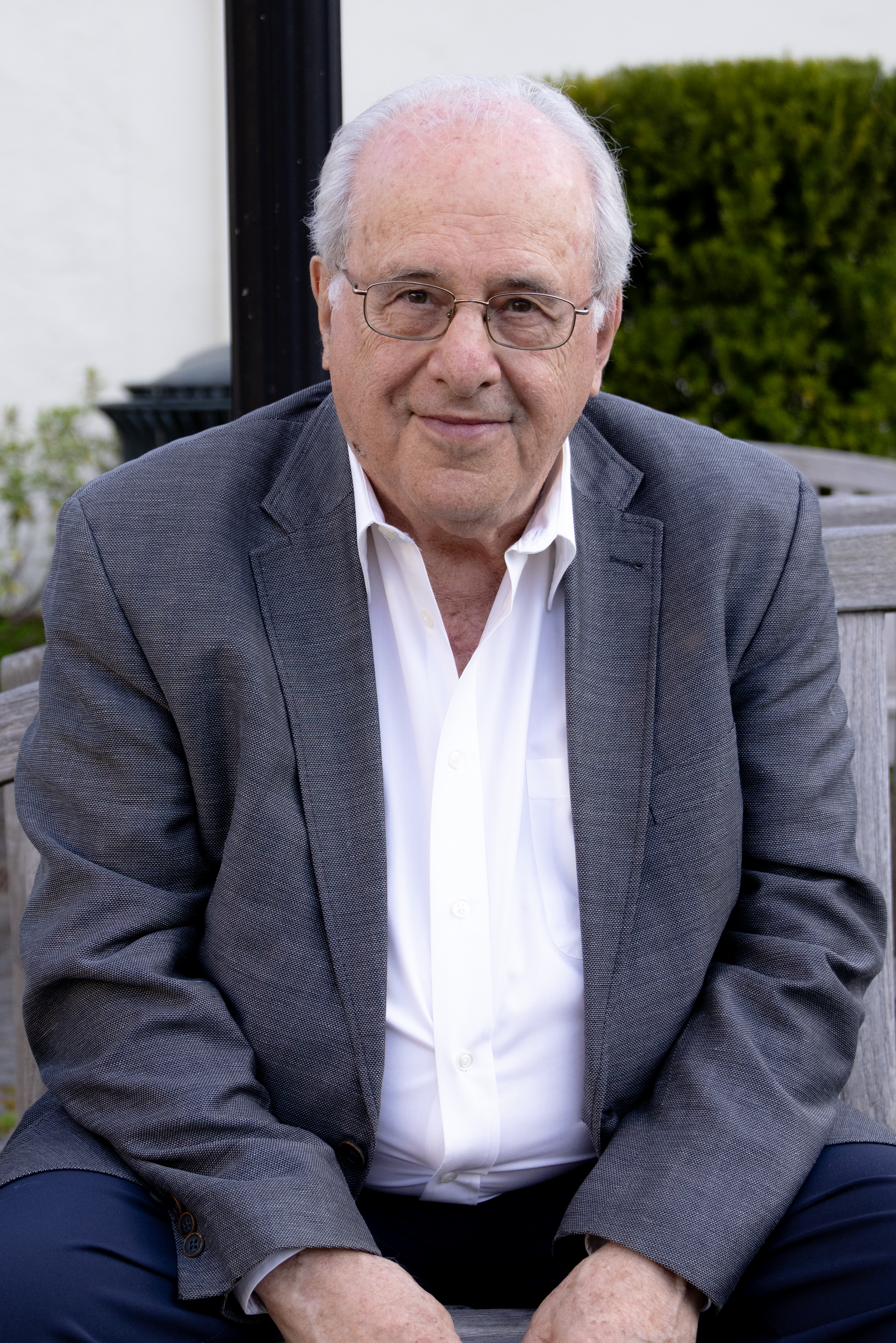
- Wolff at the 64th Annual International Affairs Symposium
- Born: Richard David Wolff; April 1, 1942 (age 84); Youngstown, Ohio, U.S.
- Spouse: Harriet Fraad
- Children: 2

Academic background
- Education: Harvard University (BA); Stanford University (MA); Yale University (MA, MA, PhD)
- Thesis: Economic Aspects of British Colonialism in Kenya, 1895–1930 (1969)
- Doctoral advisor: William N. Parker
- Influences: Althusser; Balibar; Baran; Bernstein; Engels; Gramsci; Hegel; Lenin; Lukács; Luxemburg; Marx; Sweezy

Academic work
- Discipline: Political economy; International affairs
- School or tradition: Marxian economics
- Institutions: Yale University (1967–1969); City College of New York (1969–1973); University of Massachusetts Amherst (1973–2008); The New School (2008–present)
- Wolff's voice On education
- Website: www.rdwolff.com

Richard David Wolff (born April 1, 1942) is an American Marxian economist known for his work on economic methodology and class analysis. He is a professor emeritus of economics at the University of Massachusetts Amherst and a visiting professor in the graduate program in international affairs at The New School. Wolff has also taught economics at Yale University, City College of New York, Paris 1 Panthéon-Sorbonne University, and The Brecht Forum in New York City.

In 1988, Wolff co-founded the journal Rethinking Marxism. He made the 2009 documentary Capitalism Hits the Fan. In 2012, he released three new books: Occupy the Economy: Challenging Capitalism, with David Barsamian; Contending Economic Theories: Neoclassical, Keynesian, and Marxian, with Stephen Resnick; and Democracy at Work. In 2019, he released his book Understanding Marxism.

Wolff hosts the weekly 30-minute-long program Economic Update, produced by the non-profit Democracy at Work, which he co-founded. Economic Update is on YouTube, Free Speech TV, Pacifica Radio stations (WBAI-FM, New York; KPFA-FM, Berkeley; KPFK-FM, Los Angeles), and CUNY TV (WNYE-DT3) in New York. The program is also available as a podcast.

Wolff is featured regularly in television, print, and internet media. He is considered by a number of media outlets to be influential in the field of Marxian economics, and The New York Times Magazine has named him "America's most prominent Marxist economist".

== Early life and education ==
Wolff's parents, both Jewish German citizens, emigrated to the United States in order to escape Nazism. His father, Max, a lawyer from Cologne, Germany, was unable to practice law in the U.S., but found work as a steelworker in Youngstown, Ohio, where Richard was born in 1942. The family eventually settled in New Rochelle, New York, a suburb of New York City, where Wolff grew up. Wolff has described his European background as shaping his worldview:

"Everything you expect about how the world works probably will be changed in your life, that unexpected things happen, often tragic things happen, and being flexible, being aware of a whole range of different things that happen in the world, is not just a good idea as a thinking person, but it's crucial to your survival. So, for me, I grew up convinced that understanding the political and economic environment I lived in was an urgent matter that had to be done, and made me a little different from many of my fellow kids in school who didn't have that sense of the urgency of understanding how the world worked to be able to navigate an unstable and often dangerous world. That was a very important lesson for me."

Wolff earned a Bachelor of Arts, magna cum laude, in history from Harvard College in 1963. There he was privately tutored by Fritz Pappenheim in a thorough reading of the works of Karl Marx, which Pappenheim did to repay a debt he felt he owed to Wolff's father who had been instrumental in saving him from the Holocaust. He studied at Stanford University with Paul A. Baran, earning a Master of Arts in economics in 1964. After Baran's death in 1964, Wolff transferred to Yale University, where he received a second master's degree in economics in 1966, a Master of Arts in history in 1967, and a Doctor of Philosophy in economics in 1969. At Yale, he worked as an instructor. His dissertation, "Economic Aspects of British Colonialism in Kenya, 1895–1930", was published as a book in 1974.

== Academic career ==
Wolff began teaching at the City College of New York in 1969, where he collaborated with economist Stephen Resnick, who joined in 1971 after being denied tenure at Yale for signing an anti-war petition. In 1973, Wolff and Resnick, along with economists Samuel Bowles, Herbert Gintis, and Richard Edwards, joined the Economics Department at the University of Massachusetts Amherst, where Wolff became a full professor in 1981.

Wolff retired from UMass Amherst in 2008, becoming professor emeritus, and joined The New School as a visiting professor in the graduate program in international affairs. He has also taught as a visiting or guest lecturer at institutions including Paris 1 Panthéon-Sorbonne University and The Brecht Forum in New York City.

Wolff and Resnick's early co-authored publication, "The Theory of Transitional Conjunctures and the Transition from Feudalism to Capitalism," appeared in the Review of Radical Political Economics in 1979. The article explored the transition from feudalism to capitalism, focusing on class dynamics and economic structures. Their collaboration extended to works like Knowledge and Class, which drew on Louis Althusser and Étienne Balibar's Reading Capital and interpreted Karl Marx's Capital Volumes II and III. They analyzed Marxian class theory as the study of surplus labor's performance, appropriation, and distribution, identifying class processes such as ancient, slave, feudal, capitalist, and communist.

Marx used the word "exploitation" to focus analytical attention on what capitalism shared with feudalism and slavery, something that capitalist revolutions against slavery and feudalism never overcame.

— Richard D. Wolff

In 1988, Wolff co-founded Rethinking Marxism, a journal dedicated to exploring Marxian concepts in economics and social sciences. He served on its editorial board for over two decades and remains on the advisory board as of 2025. In 1994, he was a visiting professor at Paris 1 Panthéon-Sorbonne University. Wolff continues to teach graduate seminars and undergraduate courses at The New School and lectures at various institutions.

Wolff was a founding member of the Green Party branch in New Haven, Connecticut, and its mayoral candidate in 1985. In 2011, he called for a new left-wing political party in the United States. He is a regular lecturer at the Brecht Forum and appears on television, radio, and in print media. Since 2011, he has hosted Economic Update, a weekly radio/TV show and podcast on WBAI in New York City.

One of Wolff's students, George Papandreou, served as Prime Minister of Greece from 2009 to 2011. Wolff described Papandreou as a student interested in socialist economics. However, CUNY professor Costas Panayotakis noted that Papandreou, despite campaigning against austerity, implemented a criticized austerity program after Greece's debt crisis.

Unlike most modern economists, Wolff is sceptical of the use of mathematical methodology in economics, writing with Stephen Resnick in Contending Economic Theories that "There is certainly no necessity to use mathematics. Everything in economics can be explained just as clearly and logically without it." They further speculate that usage of mathematical methodologies is motivated by "the desire of neoclassical economists to bestow on their work the aura of 'science' and 'truth' that surrounds mathematics", and that its purpose is often to "suggest that their respective economic theories have the force of mathematical necessity, the absolute truth often associated with the so-called hard natural sciences, rather like the claim that 2 + 2 = 4."

== Projects ==
Wolff is a co-founder of Democracy at Work, a non-profit that produces media and live events advocating workplace democracy and critiquing capitalism. The organization is based on his 2012 book, Democracy at Work: A Cure for Capitalism. Wolff also hosts the nationally syndicated program Economic Update with Richard D. Wolff, produced by Democracy at Work.

== Reception ==
In a review of Wolff's book Democracy at Work: A Cure for Capitalism, Hans G. Despain, writing for Marx and Philosophy, argued that the ideas presented in the book "deserve wide support and wide debate to repoliticize the American population and rejuvenate the American workforce and citizens."

== Personal life ==
In addition to his native English, Wolff is fluent in French and German. Wolff lives in New York City with his wife, Harriet Fraad, a psychotherapist. They have two children.

In an interview on The Jimmy Dore Show in January 2021, Wolff stated that he is a distant relative of the German political activist Wilhelm Wolff, to whom the first volume of Karl Marx's Das Kapital was dedicated.

== Publications ==
- Wolff, Richard D. (1974). The Economics of Colonialism. New Haven: Yale University Press. ISBN 0-300-01639-5.
- Resnick, Stephen A.; Wolff, Richard D. (1985). Rethinking Marxism: Essays for Harry Magdoff and Paul Sweezy. NY: Autonomedia.
- Wolff, Richard D.; Resnick, Stephen A. (1987). Economics: Marxian versus Neoclassical. Baltimore: Johns Hopkins Press. ISBN 0-8018-3479-1.
- Resnick, Stephen A.; Wolff, Richard D. (1987). Knowledge and Class: A Marxian Critique of Political Economy. Chicago: University of Chicago Press. ISBN 0-226-71021-1.
- Fraad, Harriet; Wolff, Richard; Resnick, Stephen (1994). Bringing It All Back Home: Class, Gender and Power in the Modern Household. Pluto Press. ISBN 0-7453-0707-8.
- Wolff, Richard D.; Resnick, Stephen; Ruccio, David F. (1988). Crisis and Transitions: A Critique of the International Economic Order. Westview Press. ISBN 0-8133-0757-0.
- Gibson-Graham, J.K.; Resnick, Stephen A.; Wolff, Richard D. (2000). Class and Its Others. Minneapolis: Minnesota University Press. ISBN 0-8166-3618-4.
- Gibson-Graham, J.K.; Resnick, Stephen A.; Wolff, Richard D. (2001). Re/Presenting Class: Essays in Postmodern Marxism. Durham: Duke University Press. ISBN 0-8223-2709-0.
- Resnick, Stephen A.; Wolff, Richard D. (2002). Class Theory and History: Capitalism and Communism in the USSR. NY: Routledge. ISBN 0-415-93317-X.
- Resnick, Stephen A.; Wolff, Richard D. (2006). New Departures in Marxian Theory. NY: Routledge. ISBN 0-415-77025-4.
- Wolff, Richard D. (2009). Capitalism Hits the Fan. Olive Branch Press. ISBN 978-1-56656-784-8.
- Wolff, Richard D.; Resnick, Stephen A. (2012). Contending Economic Theories: Neoclassical, Keynesian, and Marxian. Cambridge, MA: MIT Press. ISBN 978-0-262-01800-5.
- Wolff, Richard D. (2012). Democracy at Work: A Cure for Capitalism. Chicago: Haymarket Books. ISBN 978-1-60846-247-6.
- Wolff, Richard D. (2016). Capitalism's Crisis Deepens: Essays on the Global Economic Meltdown. Chicago: Haymarket Books. ISBN 978-1-60846-595-8.
- Wolff, Richard D. (2019). Understanding Marxism. New York: Democracy at Work. ISBN 978-0-359-46702-0.
- Wolff, Richard D. (2019). Understanding Socialism. New York: Democracy at Work. ISBN 978-0-578-22734-4.
- Wolff, Richard D. (2020). The Sickness is the System: When Capitalism Fails to Save Us from Pandemics or Itself. New York: Democracy at Work.
- Wolff, Richard D. (2024). Understanding Capitalism. New York: Democracy at Work. ISBN 978-1-7356013-6-6.

== Films ==
- Wolff, Richard (2009). Capitalism Hits the Fan (DVD). Media Education Foundation. ISBN 1-932869-30-1.
