= Diverse economies =

Heterodox economic approach

Diverse economies are the study of economy originally advanced by the feminist economic geographers J. K. Gibson-Graham in her book The End of Capitalism (As We Knew It). While mainstream economics has historically focused on formal market transactions, wage labor, and capitalist enterprise, diverse economies action research uncovers the varied range of economic activities that actually underpin livelihoods around the world.

Diverse economies scholarship is now present in a wide variety of academic disciplines, including geography, anthropology, sociology, business and organization studies, and across the arts and humanities.

== Diverse economies iceberg ==
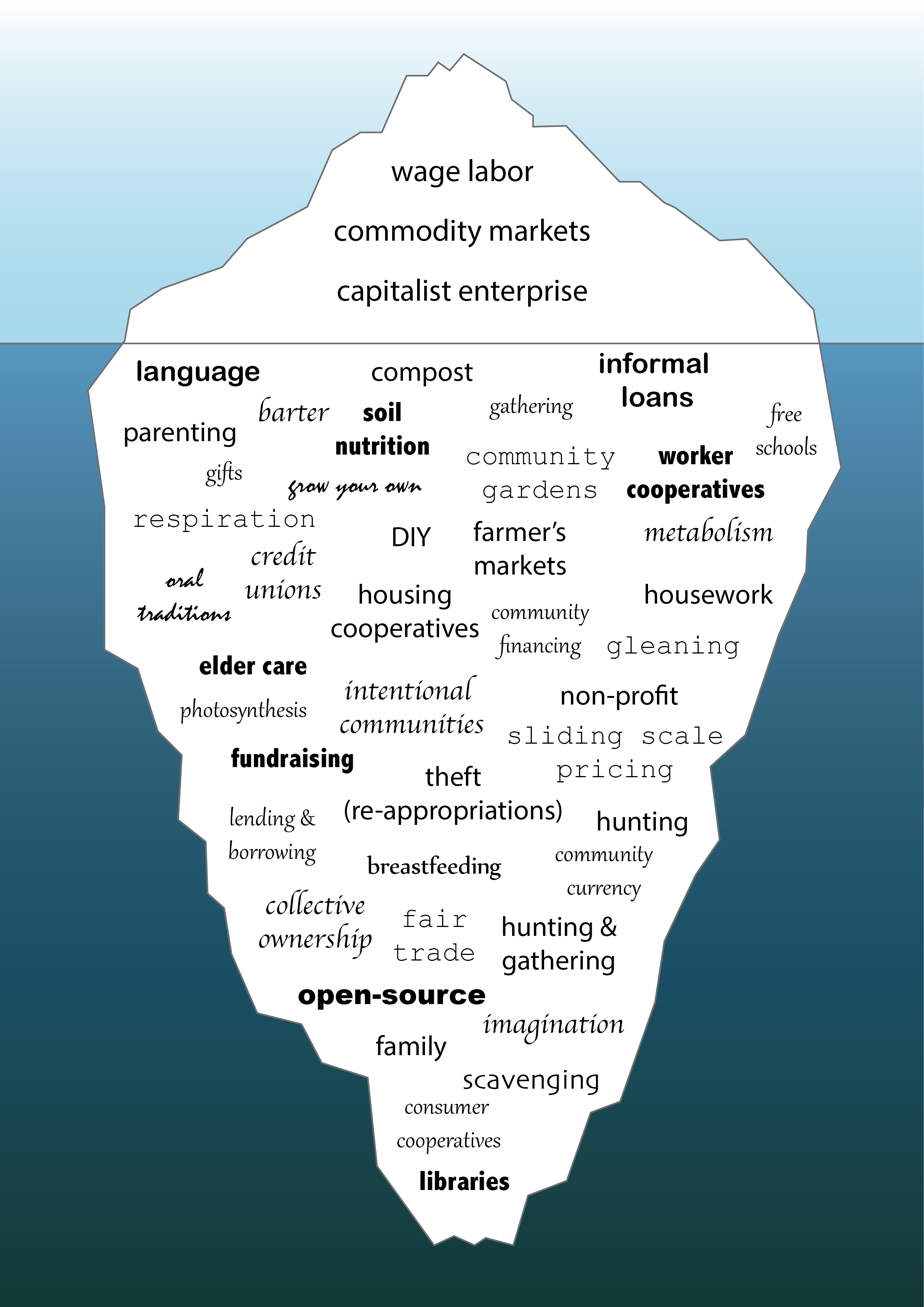
Diverse Economies Iceberg

Economic diversity has been widely represented in the form of the diverse economies iceberg. Here, wage labor, commodity markets, and capitalist enterprise form the visible tip of the iceberg, while heterodox or non-market forms of exchange and economic activity are hidden under the waterline. The latter includes worker cooperatives, housework, scavenging, and DIY, among others.

Researchers and activists can use the diverse economies iceberg to visually inventory economic diversity around them, both positive and negative (see, for instance, the inclusion of "theft/re-appropriation").

The iceberg has been adapted to a wide variety of local contexts and issues. These have included:

- a floating "diverse economies coconut", exploring gendered economic roles in Melanesia
- a "diverse economies bogberg", exploring community work and economies related to peat bogs in Ireland
- an adapted Italian-language diverse economies iceberg, including supplementary terms pertinent to that context, such as "usi civici" (a form of commoning rights) and "cucine popolari" (popular kitchens providing free meals)
- a Spanish-language version, adapted by an Argentinian community association

== Reading for economic difference ==
Gibson-Graham refers to the tendency to view all economic activity through the lens of capitalism as "capitalocentrism". Capitalocentrism leads to widespread capitalist realism and the view that "there is no alternative" (TINA). Inspired by earlier poststructural feminist and anti-essentialist thought, she encourages an alternative approach of reading for "difference, not dominance". The resulting economic landscape makes it evident that:

in the interstices of capitalist economic organization there lurk vibrant and timeless forms of self-employment and small business, family feudalism and slave enterprise, and non-market relations like gift-giving, reciprocity and unpaid caring labor. Added to this are more recent experiments with worker-owned cooperatives, state enterprise and social enterprise, fair-trade and community land trusts.

Rather than merely "lurking in the interstices", Gibson-Graham has elsewhere argued that non-capitalist forms of economic activity, such as care labor, quantitatively eclipse capitalist organisation. 90% of global fishing, for example, "is conducted by small-scale fishers (FAO 2015, p. ix), on boats where labour and compensation are organized by community or kin relations". Translating across a variety of economic sectors, this perspective builds on pioneering work by feminist economists, including Marilyn Waring in her book If Women Counted.

Following work by Gibson-Graham, researchers and activists have tried to more systematically inventory and understand this economic diversity in the following five areas:

- Enterprise: Beyond the traditional enterprise or capitalist firm, in which surplus is monopolised by owners or shareholders, diverse economies scholars are interested in non-capitalist or more-than-capitalist organisations in which surplus, for instance, is communally shared or used for ends other than private gain.
- Labor: Beyond wage labor, diverse economies research explores the many forms of work that are unpaid or unremunerated, including work done by non-human economic actors. This can include care work, habitat restoration, and volunteering, but also undesirable forms, such as slave labor.
- Transactions: Beyond commodity exchange on the capitalist market, transactions are the various encounters that occur between economic units or entities. These can take such diverse forms as gift giving, theft, fair trade systems, barter, and much more.
- Property: Beyond private ownership of a material object, property is increasingly seen as immaterial and relational, ranging from patents and open-source computer code, to traditional commons-based management of collective property.
- Finance: Beyond the use of money to create more private wealth (perhaps most famously on Wall Street), finance can refer to diverse other forms of resourcing, borrowing, and lending, including credit unions, crowdfunding, donations, bribery, community currencies, and much more.

== Community economies ==
The term "diverse economies" relates to the general economic diversity that exists in a particular area or community and is closely related to J.K. Gibson-Graham's more ethically charged work on "community economies". While diverse economies is a general description of heterogeneity, potentially including morally reprehensible activities (see the example of slavery, above), community economies actively seek "to bring about more sustainable and equitable forms of development by cultivating and acting on new ways of thinking about economies and politics." The practical work of understanding and creating community economies was developed in the book Take Back The Economy.

Community economies are framed around a cluster of ethical concerns:

- Survival: What do we really need to survive well, in balance with the well-being and needs of others and the planet?
- Surplus: How do we distribute any surplus to enrich social and environmental health?
- Transactions: How do we conduct ethical encounters with human and non-human others?
- Consumption: How do we consume sustainably and justly?
- Commons: What do we share with human and non-human others, and how do we maintain, replenish, and growth this commons?
- Investment: What do we do with stored wealth? How do we invest this wealth so that future generations may live well?

== Interspecies and Indigenous perspectives ==
Since the diverse economies framework was introduced in the 1990s, diverse economies scholarship has particularly expanded in postcolonial and more-than-human directions. Engagements with the environmental humanities, for example, has seen the focus move away from purely human economies, to exploring the interspecies interconnections which support livelihoods.

While earlier diverse economies work by J. K. Gibson-Graham focused on deindustrialising zones in the Global North, Indigenous and Global South perspectives have increasingly been present in diverse economies theory and practice. Here, engaging with postdevelopment theory, there has been an attempt to challenge the Eurocentric underpinnings of economics, and engage with different cosmologies and Indigenous epistemologies. One paper, for instance, inventories community economic practices and keywords related to subsistence livelihoods in Monsoon Asia which "all refer to relationships of care and sensitivity to the more than human world – of rivers, ancestors and specific places from which seeds spring. In each case, the more than human constitutes a commons that is made, shared by and sustains a community of commoners." Terms include provas, a traditional form of labor exchange in Cambodia; bayanihan, reciprocal labor exchange in the Philippines; Jimpitan, a practice of regularly donating rice or money to a community emergency fund in Indonesia; and Arisan, a form of rotating credit in Indonesia.
