= Harry Magdoff =

American economist (1913–2006)

Harry Samuel Magdoff
- Born: August 21, 1913; Bronx, New York, U.S.
- Died: January 1, 2006 (aged 92); Burlington, Vermont
- Education: City College of New York; New York University (BSc)
- Spouse: Beatrice Greizer (1913-2002)
- Children: Fred Magdoff

Harry Samuel Magdoff (August 21, 1913 – January 1, 2006) was a prominent American socialist commentator. He held several administrative positions in government during the presidency of Franklin D. Roosevelt and later became co-editor of the Marxist publication Monthly Review.

== Early life ==
A child of Russian-Jewish immigrants, Magdoff grew up in the Bronx. In 1929, at age 15, Magdoff first started reading Karl Marx when he picked up a copy of A Contribution to the Critique of Political Economy in a used-book store. "It blew my mind," recalled Magdoff in 2003. "His view of history was a revelation....that got me started reading about economics. We were going into the Depression then and I wanted to figure out what it all meant." His interest in Marx led him to embrace socialism.

Magdoff studied mathematics and physics from 1930 to 1933 at the City College of New York taking engineering, math and physics courses; he was active in the Social Problems Club with many schoolmates who later joined the Abraham Lincoln Brigade, a Comintern organization that fought in the Spanish Civil War. Many also joined the US Armed Forces. Magdoff attended New York University after 1933, where he studied economics and statistics, receiving a B.Sc in Economics in 1935. He was suspended and later expelled from City College for activities related to editing Frontiers (a radical student magazine not sanctioned by the school), including participation in a mock trial of the school's president and its director.

== Government service ==
After college, David Weintraub Head of the WPA's National Research Project assisted him to get a job with the Works Progress Administration measuring the productivity of various manufacturing industries. By 1940 Magdoff was the WPA's Principal Statistician. During World War II Magdoff worked on the National Defense and Advisory Board and the War Production Board, in the Statistical and Tools Divisions. He left the Commerce Department at the end of 1946.

== Post-government career ==
Magdoff was happy to leave his position with the United States Department of Commerce, on December 30, 1946, and went to work for the New Council on American Business in New York until 1948, at which time he began employment with Trubeck Laboratories in New Jersey.

He was an economic adviser and speechwriter to former Vice-President and then unsuccessful Presidential candidate Henry Wallace, who ran as the Progressive Party candidate in 1948. Unable to be reemployed in government because of security concerns, he found a career in academia beginning in the 1950s.

After the Cuban Revolution, Magdoff traveled to Cuba and had an all-night meeting with Che Guevara, whom he later described as a "sweet and polite man". This long brainstorming session on the potential obstacles the new revolution would face, sparked a mutual camaraderie that led to Magdoff also meeting with Guevara during his 1964 visit to the United Nations in New York City.

The Age of Imperialism, his first and arguably most influential book, came out in 1969. The book sold over 100,000 copies and was translated into fifteen languages. Two years later after the death of Leo Huberman, Magdoff began co-editing the Monthly Review with Paul Sweezy, and continued to edit the magazine into his 90th year. Magdoff and Sweezy together produced five books, as well as many years of Monthly Review. One of Magdoff's last books was Imperialism without Colonies, published at age 89.

Under Magdoff's direction, the Monthly Review increasing focused on imperialism as the key unit of analysis for global development and the forces challenging neocolonialism in the Third World. This perspective put the magazine and its press squarely on the New Left intellectual agenda since the late 1960s. The Great Depression left a strong impact on Magdoff's perspective on capitalism, as Magdoff recalled a sense of doom felt in the 20th mid-century by pro-capitalists, holding that nothing since 1929 led him to believe that the economy has become immune to cycles of severe crisis. Until his death, Magdoff co-edited the Monthly Review with John Bellamy Foster.

== Personal life ==
Magdoff had two sons, one of whom, Fred Magdoff, is an expert in plant and soil science. His wife of almost 70 years, Beatrice, died in 2002.

== Accusations of espionage ==
Magdoff has been accused by a number of authors as having been complicit in Soviet espionage activity during his time in US government. He was accused of passing information to Soviet intelligence networks in the United States, primarily through what the FBI called the "Perlo Group." Magdoff was never indicted, but after the end of the Cold War, a number of scholars have inspected declassified documents (including those of the Venona project) from U.S. and Soviet archives. They cite these documents to support the claim that Magdoff was involved in espionage. Other authors have taken issue with some of the broader interpretations of such materials which implicate many Americans in espionage for the Soviet Union, and the allegation that Harry Magdoff was an information source for the Soviets is disputed by several academics and historians asserting that Magdoff probably had no malicious intentions and committed no crimes.

== Publications ==
- The Age of Imperialism (1969)
- The Dynamics of U.S. Capitalism (1970) with Paul M. Sweezy
- The End of Prosperity (1977) with Paul M. Sweezy
- Imperialism: From the Colonial Age to the Present (1978)
- The Deepening Crisis of U.S. Capitalism (1980) with Paul M. Sweezy
- Stagnation and the Financial Explosion (1987) with Paul M. Sweezy
- The Irreversible Crisis (1988) with Paul M. Sweezy
- Imperialism without Colonies (2003)
