= Katherine Gibson =

Australian feminist economic geographer

- Born: 1953 (age 72–73)
- Occupation: Geographer
- Known for: Diverse economies

Academic work
- Discipline: Human geography
- Institutions: Western Sydney University

Katherine Gibson (born 1953) is an Australian human geographer and professor emeritus at Western Sydney University. She has written books and articles on diverse economies and co-founded the Community Economies Research Network (CERN). She is part of the writing duo called J.K. Gibson-Graham, and was a key figure in starting the annual Liviana conferences in 2020. She was appointed Gough Whitlam and Malcolm Fraser Visiting Professor of Australian Studies at Harvard University in 2020-21.

== Publications include ==
- Cameron J, & Gibson, K., 2020. Action Research for Diverse Economies, in J.K. Gibson-Graham & K. Dombroski (eds), Handbook of Diverse Economies, Edward Elgar, Cheltenham, UK, Chapter 56.
