= Paul A. Baran =

American economist (1909–1964)

Paul Alexander Baran
- Economist Paul A. Baran as he appeared in the late 1950s
- Born: 30 August 1909; Mykolaiv, Kherson Governorate, Russian Empire (present-day Ukraine)
- Died: 26 March 1964 (aged 54); Palo Alto, California, U.S.

Academic background
- Influences: Karl Marx, Michał Kalecki, Josef Steindl, John Kenneth Galbraith

Academic work
- Discipline: Macroeconomics
- School or tradition: Neo-Marxian economics
- Notable ideas: Law of rising surplus

Paul Alexander Baran (/ˈbærən/; 30 August 1909 – 26 March 1964) was an American Marxian economist. In 1951, he was promoted to full professor at Stanford University and became the only tenured Marxist teaching economics in the U.S. until his death in 1964. He wrote The Political Economy of Growth in 1957, and then co-authored with Paul Sweezy the seminal economics text, Monopoly Capital, published posthumously in 1966.

== Life and work ==
Baran was born as Saul Baran in Mykolaiv, Imperial Russia, to a Jewish family, on August 30, 1909. His father, a Menshevik, left Russia for Vilnius, Lithuania in 1917. From Vilna the Baran family moved to Berlin, and then in 1925 back to Moscow, but Paul stayed in Germany to finish his secondary school. In 1926 he attended the Plekhanov Institute in Moscow. He left again for Germany in 1928, accepting an appointment as an assistant on agricultural research with his advisor, Dr. Friedrich Pollock. In his formative years in the 1920s, Baran studied Marxist doctrine and joined socialist youth groups.

He remained in Germany and was associated with the Frankfurt School Institute for Social Research. He then received a Diplom-Volkswirt (graduate degree in political economy, equivalent to a master's degree) in 1931 from the Schlesische Friedrich-Wilhelms-Universität zu Breslau. While in Breslau, he participated in the fight against rising Hitlerism by speaking at trade union meetings, authoring articles and leaflets, and giving radio broadcasts. Under the guidance of Emil Lederer, Baran completed his dissertation on economic planning and received a PhD in April 1933 from the University of Berlin. Earlier that year, he met with noted Marxist economist Rudolf Hilferding, author of Finance Capital. During this time, Baran was writing articles under the pen name of "Alexander Gabriel" (reportedly to protect his parents in the USSR) for the German Social Democratic Party journal Die Gesellschaft.

After the Nazi regime consolidated power, Baran fled to Paris in May 1933 where he did research jobs. In 1934 he obtained a visa to visit his parents in the USSR. Next, he went to Vilnius, then to Warsaw, and from there to London. In 1939, with the signing of the Molotov–Ribbentrop Pact and just before the Nazi invasion of Poland, Baran emigrated to the U.S. where he enrolled at Harvard and received a master's degree in economics.

Short of funds, he left the Harvard PhD program and obtained a series of positions during World War II: first, a research fellowship at the Brookings Institution where he worked on problems of price controls; then, a brief stint at the Office of Price Administration; and from 1942–45, he was in the U.S. Army, assigned as an economist to the Office of Strategic Services (OSS) where he attained the rank of Technical Sergeant. In 1945 he contributed to the U.S. Strategic Bombing Survey, working under the direction of John Kenneth Galbraith and traveling to post-war Germany and Japan. In 1946, he held a post with the U.S. Department of Commerce and lectured at George Washington University. Next, he spent three years with the Federal Reserve Bank of New York before resigning to join academia.

Baran was hired as an associate professor at Stanford University in 1949; two years later, he was promoted to full professor with tenure. As economist Robert Heilbroner wrote, "Until his death in 1964, Paul Baran was virtually the only left-wing Marxist economist in the United States who held a full-time academic appointment. Since he was nothing if not outspoken in his beliefs, he was undoubtedly a trial for the authorities at Stanford, who, to their credit, resisted continual pressure from patriotic organizations to fire him." Notable among Baran's Stanford students was the future Marxist economist Richard D. Wolff.

In 1949, Baran initiated an active partnership with the newly formed leftist magazine, Monthly Review, edited by Paul Sweezy and Leo Huberman. Baran helped to set the magazine's intellectual direction. A few years earlier, he had tried unsuccessfully to launch his own weekly magazine which he hoped would be an American equivalent to The Economist.

Baran was married once, to Elena Djatschenko. They met shortly after he began teaching at Stanford. Before divorcing, they had a son Nicholas born in April 1952. Nicholas became an attorney and a computer technology journalist. He co-edited the book of his father's correspondence.

In 1960, Baran visited post-revolutionary Cuba along with Sweezy and Huberman, and was greatly inspired. As a warning sign of his declining health, Baran suffered a heart attack in December 1960, but he recovered sufficiently to continue working and traveling. In 1962 he visited Moscow, Iran, and Yugoslavia. In his last years, he worked intensively with Sweezy on their analysis of the modern American economy, Monopoly Capital. In March 1964, at age 54, Baran suffered a fatal heart attack before the book could be completed. Sweezy went on to finish Monopoly Capital and shared the writing credit with Baran when it was published in 1966.

== Economic ideas ==
Baran's ideas were part of the Neo-Marxian economics school. He introduced the "law of rising surplus" to deal with novel complexities raised by the dominance of monopoly capital. With Sweezy, Baran explained the importance of this idea, its consistency with Marx's labor concept of value, and its relation to Marx's notion of surplus value. According to Baran's categories, as specified in The Political Economy of Growth (1957), "Actual economic surplus" is "the difference between society's actual current output and its actual current consumption. It is thus identical to current saving or accumulation". "Potential economic surplus", in contrast, is "the difference between the output that could be produced in a given natural and technical environment with the help of employable productive resources, and what might be regarded as essential consumption." Baran also discussed the concept of "planned economic surplus"—a category that could only be operationalized in a rationally planned socialist society. This was defined as "the difference between society's 'optimum' output available in a historically given natural and technological environment under conditions of planned 'optimal' utilization of all available productive resources, and some chosen 'optimal' volume of consumption."

In The Political Economy of Growth—which sold over 50,000 copies and was translated into eight languages—Baran employed the surplus concept to analyze underdeveloped countries. In Monopoly Capital, he and Sweezy applied the concept to the contemporary U.S. economy, which they claimed had entered the monopoly capitalism stage where the law of rising surplus superseded the classical Marxist law of the falling rate of profit. In 2017, Monthly Review Press published selected letters between Baran and Sweezy. Their correspondence illuminates the development of their ideas on political economy, and in particular, their collaboration in writing Monopoly Capital.

== Selected bibliography ==
- Baran, Paul A. (January 1952). "On the Political Economy of Backwardness". The Manchester School. 21 (1): 66–84.
- Baran, Paul A. (October 1952). "Fascism in America". Monthly Review. Vol. 4, no. 6. pp. 181–89. Published under the pseudonym "Historicus".
- Baran, Paul A. (1957), The Political Economy of Growth, Monthly Review Press. LCCN 57-7953
- Baran, Paul A. (1959). "Reflections on underconsumption". In Abramovitz, Moses (ed.). The Allocation of Economic Resources: Essays in Honor of Bernard Francis Haley. Stanford, California: Stanford University Press. LCCN 59-7420. OCLC 490147128.
- Baran, Paul A. (1960), Marxism and Psychoanalysis [pamphlet] Monthly Review Press.
- Baran, Paul A. (1961), The Commitment of the Intellectual, [pamphlet] Monthly Review Press.
- Baran, Paul A. (1961), Reflections on the Cuban Revolution, [pamphlet] Monthly Review Press.
- Baran, Paul A.; Sweezy, Paul M. (Winter 1964). "Theses on Advertising". Science & Society. 28 (1): 20–30. JSTOR 40401000.
- Baran, Paul A.; Sweezy, Paul M. (1966), Monopoly Capital: An Essay on the American Economic and Social Order, Monthly Review Press. LCCN 65-15269.
- Baran, Paul A. (1970). O'Neill, John (ed.). The Longer View: Essays toward a Critique of Political Economy. Monthly Review Press. ISBN 978-0853451136.
- Baran, Paul A.; Sweezy, Paul M. (July–August 2013). "The Quality of Monopoly Capitalist Society: Culture and Communications". Monthly Review. Vol. 65, no. 3. Contains the text of an unfinished chapter originally intended for inclusion in Monopoly Capital.
