= Yaple =

Yaple is a surname. Notable people with the surname include:

- Emily Yaple (born 2002), American professional soccer player
- George L. Yaple (1851–1939), American politician from Michigan
- Maxine Yaple Sweezy (1911–2004), American economist
