= Fred Magdoff =

American soil scientist

Fred Magdoff is an American soil scientist. He is Emeritus Professor of Plant and Soil Science at the University of Vermont.

He received a BA in history from Oberlin College in 1963 and both an MA in 1965 and Phd in 1969 from Cornell University in soil science.

He is the son of socialist commentator Harry Magdoff.

He is a regular contributor to Monthly Review.

== Books ==
- with John Bellamy Foster The Great Financial Crisis: Causes and Consequences (Monthly Review Press, 2009)
- with Michael Yates The ABCs of the Economic Crisis: What Working People Need to Know (Monthly Review Press, 2009)
- with Brian Tokar Agriculture and Food in Crisis: Conflict, Resistance, and Renewal (Monthly Review Press, 2010)
- with John Bellamy Foster What Every Environmentalist Needs to Know about Capitalism: A Citizen’s Guide to Capitalism and the Environment (Monthly Review Press, 2011)
- with Chris Williams Creating an Ecological Society (Monthly Review Press, 2017)
- with Harold Van Es Building Soils for Better Crops: Ecological Management for Healthy Soils
