= Monopoly Capital =

1966 book by Paul Sweezy and Paul A. Baran

Monopoly Capital: An Essay on the American Economic and Social Order
- Cover of the 1967 edition
- Authors: Paul Sweezy, Paul A. Baran
- Language: English
- Subject: Monopoly
- Publisher: Monthly Review Press
- Publication date: 1966
- Publication place: United States
- Media type: Print

Monopoly Capital: An Essay on the American Economic and Social Order is a 1966 book by the Marxian economists Paul Sweezy and Paul A. Baran. It was published by Monthly Review Press. It made a major contribution to Marxian theory by shifting attention from the assumption of a competitive economy to the monopolistic economy associated with the giant corporations that dominate the modern accumulation process. Their work played a leading role in the intellectual development of the New Left in the 1960s and 1970s. As a review in the American Economic Review stated, it represented "the first serious attempt to extend Marx’s model of competitive capitalism to the new conditions of monopoly capitalism." It attracted renewed attention following the Great Recession.

== Argument ==
Big business can maintain setting prices at high levels while still competing to cut costs, advertise, and market their products. The actual and potential economic surplus generated exceeds the existing outlets for investment and capitalist consumption. Private accumulation therefore requires the support of government spending geared primarily towards imperialistic and militaristic government tendencies, which is the easiest and surest way to utilize surplus productive capacity. Other forms of absorbing the surplus include expansion of the sales effort and the growth of finance, insurance, and real estate.

== The economic surplus ==
One of the key contributions of Monopoly Capital is its application of the concept of economic surplus. The economic surplus is most simply the difference between “what a society produces and the costs of producing it. The size of the surplus is an index of productivity and wealth, of how much freedom a society has to accomplish whatever goals it may set for itself. The composition of the surplus shows how it uses that freedom: how much it invests in expanding its productive capacity, how much it consumes in various forms, how much it wastes and in what ways.” Although some scholars viewed the introduction of this concept as a break with the Marxist approach to value, later publications by Baran and Sweezy, as well as other authors, have continued to establish the importance of this innovation, its consistency with Marx's labor concept of value, and supplementary relation to Marx's category of surplus value. Baran and Sweezy argue that under the oligopolistic conditions of modern economies—dominated by big business—the surplus tends to rise. The vast extent of this increasing actual and potential surplus is visible in the underutilization of productive capacity, the level of unemployment, the waste embodied in the sales effort, and military spending. This is because monopoly/oligopoly conditions result in both insufficient opportunities for profitable reinvestment of the surplus (which shows up as excess capacity and unemployment) and forms of non-price competition involve large amounts of unproductive labor (e.g. in the sales effort and product differentiation). The overall result is a tendency toward economic stagnation and increased unproductive expenditures as a response.

== Problems of surplus absorption and waste ==
Baran and Sweezy highlighted five aspects of the surplus absorption problem. First, that capitalist class luxury consumption could not rise as fast as the available surplus and monopoly conditions limited outlets for productive investment. Second, spending on the sales effort was an important outlet for surplus as large firms engaged in non-price forms of competition and sought to enlarge demand. However, such marketing expenditures (advertising, sales promotion, excessive model changes, etc.) do not provide any additional use-value and therefore may be treated as waste. Third, capitalist opposition to civilian spending as a threat to their class interests and class power limited the ability of such spending to provide effective demand. Fourth, military spending does not compete with capitalist interests in the same way as civilian spending and through imperialism serves to enhance those interests. Therefore, military spending is able to expand to a degree civilian spending is not, providing an important outlet for surplus absorption. Fifth, spending on finance can serve to absorb a portion of the surplus and boost the economy, at the expense of greater debt expansion and long-term instability.

== The irrational qualities of monopoly capitalist society ==
In the book's concluding chapters Baran and Sweezy highlight the growing disparity between the productive potential of US society and the waste and misuse of that potential. They point to racial disparities and the social and cultural costs of the current structure of the political economic system where real basic needs for human development such as education and housing are not met while a belligerent militarism and cultural traits associated today with “consumerism” are cultivated with great effort in the interests of profit. They see the primary weaknesses of the system to be in the imperial realm, as countries in the periphery revolt against the domination of monopoly capital over their economies, a revolt that is increasingly mirrored in the resistance of peoples of color, making up a critical part of the working class, within the United States itself.

== Monopoly capital and the Great Recession ==
With the 2008 financial crisis and the Great Recession of these years, followed by conditions of economic stagnation, some political economists have argued that Baran and Sweezy's analysis in Monopoly Capital is key to the theoretical and historical explanation of these events. This has led to an extension of theory to address what is called "monopoly-finance capital," the "internationalization of monopoly capital," the globalization of the reserve army of labor, and the growing monopolization of communications, most dramatically the Internet.

== See also ==
- History of economic thought
