= Michael Yates (economist) =

American economist

Michael D. Yates (born 1946) is an economist and a labor educator, and editorial director of the socialist publishing house Monthly Review Press. He advocates a socialist view of economics.

== Early life and education ==
Yates was born in a small coal mining town about 40 miles north of Pittsburgh, Pennsylvania. His grandmother worked on a barge boat as a cook and a servant for families in Manhattan, Newport, and other wealthy enclaves. His immediate family had a long history working at dangerous, unhealthy jobs in the coal mines. Yates' father worked in a large glass factory several miles away. The first Yates home did not have hot running water or an indoor toilet, and was owned by the mining company. When Michael was one year old, his parents moved the family to an old house on the farm of a family friend. There was now hot water but still no indoor plumbing.

A few years later, the family moved again, to a newly built house closer to the glass factory. At the age of 14, his mother took a job unloading dynamite at the entrance of the coal mines. His mother, uncle and grandmother all suffered from severe asthma from the dust generated by the mines. His father suffered emphysema from inhaling asbestos and silica dust at work as well as from cigarette smoking.

Yates attended graduate school at the University of Pittsburgh (UP) from 1967 to 1973, although only the first two years were full-time.

== Teaching and later career ==
In the summer of 1968, Yates received his induction notice. With the encouragement of an academic advisor, he applied for a teaching position at UP's satellite campus in Johnstown, Pennsylvania. He was appointed an assistant professor in 1969. He worked part-time on his degree while teaching. Teaching deepened his radicalism, and he abandoned the neoclassical economics he had been taught. He also participated in union organizing activities, first with the maintenance and custodial workers on campus and then with the teachers.

Yates received his Ph.D. in economics from UP in 1976. He was given tenure by UP shortly after completing his doctorate. During a sabbatical leave in 1977, he served as director of research for the United Farm Workers Union at union headquarters in Keene, California. He left during a purge of union staff by union president Cesar Chavez.

Although Yates continued to teach at UP-Johnstown, in 1980 he began to teach workers and labor activists as well. He traveled, educating workers about labor unions, their right to form a union, and economics. He taught for many years in the Labor Center at the University of Massachusetts Amherst, where his students were union officers and members.

Yates began a publishing with the Monthly Review in the mid-1970s. Monthly Review Press published Yates' first book, Longer Hours, Fewer Jobs: Employment and Unemployment in the United States. Three more books and a co-edited volume followed.

In 2001, Yates retired from his position at UP-Johnstown. He and his wife began to live an itinerant existence, spending significant amounts of time in Yellowstone National Park, Manhattan, Miami Beach and Portland, Oregon. These travels were documented in the book Cheap Motels and a Hotplate. As of 2019, he and his wife have been on the road for eighteen years.

After his retirement, Yates became in 2001 associate editor at Monthly Review. In 2006, he became the editorial director of Monthly Review Press. As director, he has edited more than fifty titles. In 2018, he retired as associate editor of Monthly Review.

Yates's 2018 book, Can the Working Class Change the World?, was reviewed favorably by Lucia Morgans in a review for the Marx & Philosophy Society.

== Published works ==
=== Solely authored, co-authored, and edited works ===
- Upward Struggle: A Bicentennial Tribute to Labor in Cambria and Somerset Counties (with Bruce Williams). Harrisburg, PA: Bicentennial Pennsylvania, 1976. ASIN: B0045VKCIU
- A Labor Law Handbook. 1st ed. Cambridge, Mass.: South End Press, 1987. ISBN 0-89608-261-X
- Longer Hours, Fewer Jobs: Employment and Unemployment in the United States. New York: Monthly Review Press, 1994. ISBN 99961-64-03-9
- Power on the Job: The Legal Rights of Working People. Cambridge, Mass.: South End Press, 1994. ISBN 0-89608-498-1
- Why Unions Matter. New York: Monthly Review Press, 1998. ISBN 0-85345-929-0
- Naming the System: Inequality and Work in the Global Economy. New York: Monthly Review Press, 2003. ISBN 1-58367-079-3
- Cheap Motels and a Hot Plate: An Economist's Travelogue. New York: Monthly Review Press, 2007. ISBN 1-58367-143-9
- More Unequal: Aspects of Class in the United States. New York: Monthly Review Press, 2007. ISBN 1-58367-159-5
- In and Out of the Working Class. Winnipeg: Arbeiter Ring Publishing, 2009. ISBN 1-894037-35-9
- Why Unions Matter, 2nd edition. New York: Monthly Review Press, 2009. ISBN 978-1583671900
- The ABCs of the Economic Crisis: What Working People Need to Know (with Fred Magdoff). New York: Monthly Review Press, 2009. ISBN 978-1583671955
- Wisconsin Uprising: Labor Fights Back. New York: Monthly Review Press, 2012. ISBN 978-1583672808
- A Freedom Budget for All Americans: Recapturing the Promise of the Civil Rights Movement in the Struggle for Economic Justice Today (with Paul Le Blanc). New York: Monthly Review Press, 2013. ISBN 978-1583673607
- The Great Inequality. London: Routledge, 2016.ISBN 978-1138183452
- Can the Working Class Change the World. New York: Monthly Review Press, 2018. ISBN 978-1583677100
- Work Work Work: Labor, Alienation, and Class Struggle. New York: Monthly Review Press, 2022. ISBN 978-1-58367-965-4

=== Co-edited works ===
- Meiksins Wood, Ellen; Meiksins, Peter; and Yates, Michael D., eds. Rising from the Ashes?: Labor in the Age of "Global" Capitalism. New York: Monthly Review Press, 1998. ISBN 0-85345-939-8
