= J. K. Gibson-Graham =

Pen name for two feminist economic geographers

J. K. Gibson-Graham is a pen name shared by feminist economic geographers Julie Graham and Katherine Gibson. The two professors' landmark first book The End of Capitalism (As We Knew It) was first published in 1996 (a second edition with a new Introduction was published in 2006), followed by A Postcapitalist Politics in 2006. The two scholars also founded the Community Economies Collective (CEC), the Community Economies Research Network (CERN) and the Community Economies Institute (CEI), all "international collaborative networks of researchers who share an interest in theorizing, discussing, representing and ultimately enacting new visions of economy." Gibson-Graham's works focus on untying the economy from capitalism and the possibility of transforming economic relations within existing conditions.

Katherine Gibson and Julie Graham first met in the late 1970s, as PhD students at Clark University in Worcester, Massachusetts. Their collaboration lasted for over three decades, until Julie Graham died on 4 April 2010 of complications from cancer. Since then, Gibson has continued to publish texts relevant to their joint project under their pen name. This includes, for instance, Take Back the Economy: An Ethical Guide for Transforming Our Communities (2013; co-authored with Jenny Cameron and Stephen Healy), and the edited collection The Handbook of Diverse Economies (Gibson-Graham and Dombroski 2020).

== Biography ==
In the late 1970s, Katherine Gibson moved from her home country of Australia to the US to undertake her doctorate at Clark University. Prior to the move, Gibson had completed an undergraduate degree in geography at the University of Sydney and postgraduate studies in community development at Macquarie University. During her studies in Australia in the early 1970s, Gibson had undertaken research among working-class communities in inner-city Sydney. She later worked at the Australian National University, where she established herself as an area studies scholar with a focus on Asia and the Pacific. Gibson is currently Emeritus Professor at the Institute of Culture and Society, Western Sydney University, and co-director of the Community Economies Institute.

Julie Graham (born 1945) was from the US, and came into the discipline of geography after a degree in English literature from Smith College. She completed her PhD in 1984 and served as Associate Department Head for Geography at the University of Massachusetts, Amherst between 1999 and 2006. During her time in Amherst, she collaborated with the economists Stephen Resnick and Richard Wolff, among others.

Gibson and Graham's first collaboration and co-authorship came in their second semester of graduate studies, as part of a course on regional development taught by the geographer Richard Peet. Subsequent collective work as J. K. Gibson-Graham was influenced by poststructuralist feminism and queer theory, and attempted to break from the image of the heroic individual scholar. The collaboration emerged from “a theoretical and political commitment to knowledge production as a shared and creative practice of care for self, for others, and for communities.”

== Work ==
At Clark University, the doctoral research of both Gibson and Graham was deeply influenced by Marxian political economy, focusing on processes of economic and industrial restructuring in Australia and the US, respectively. However, through their collaborative project as J. K. Gibson-Graham, and during empirical projects in the Pioneer Valley in the US and Latrobe Valley in Australia, both would soon break from this focus on structural critiques of capitalist exploitation.

When Gibson and Graham met, the discipline of geography was increasingly divided between quantitative and humanistic approaches. Gibson-Graham established the field of diverse economies, which seeks to rethink economy and re-vision economic development. They and the community economies collective draw on human geography (especially economic geography), political economy, poststructuralism, feminism, and ongoing community-based research to pursue three major research directions:

- Producing a language of the diverse economy that highlights the variety of transactions, forms of labor, class relations, types of enterprise, ecological relationships, and development dynamics in contemporary economies
- Generating narratives, models and projects of non-capitalist and alternative capitalist development
- Constructing and strengthening community economies in place through action research.

Diverse economies scholarship continues to evolve and be updated. In December 2025, for instance, a paper by Gibson-Graham and Ethan Miller sought to rethink this work from a decolonial viewpoint. This acknowledged the diversity of community economies that have been practiced by Indigenous people and developed a critique informed by Indigenous thinking of the idea of an "economy" as something separate from other dimensions of lifeworlds. Another strand which has emerged are ecological and more-than-human perspectives, as seen in the book Manifesto for Living in the Anthropocene, co-edited by Katherine Gibson.

=== Capitalocentrism ===
In 1996, Gibson-Graham popularized and furthered discussion on a concept called "capitalocentrism":

This term refers to the dominant representation of all economic activities in terms of their relationship to capitalism—as the same as, the opposite to, a complement of, or contained within capitalism. Our attempts to destabilize the hegemony of capitalocentrism have included a number of theoretical strategies:

1) production of different representations of economic identity, and

2) development of different narratives of economic development.

Their work focuses on moving beyond a "capitalocentric" viewpoint and recognizing the wide range of economic practices that co-exist, even in so-called "capitalist" or "socialist" economies.

=== Reading for Economic Difference ===
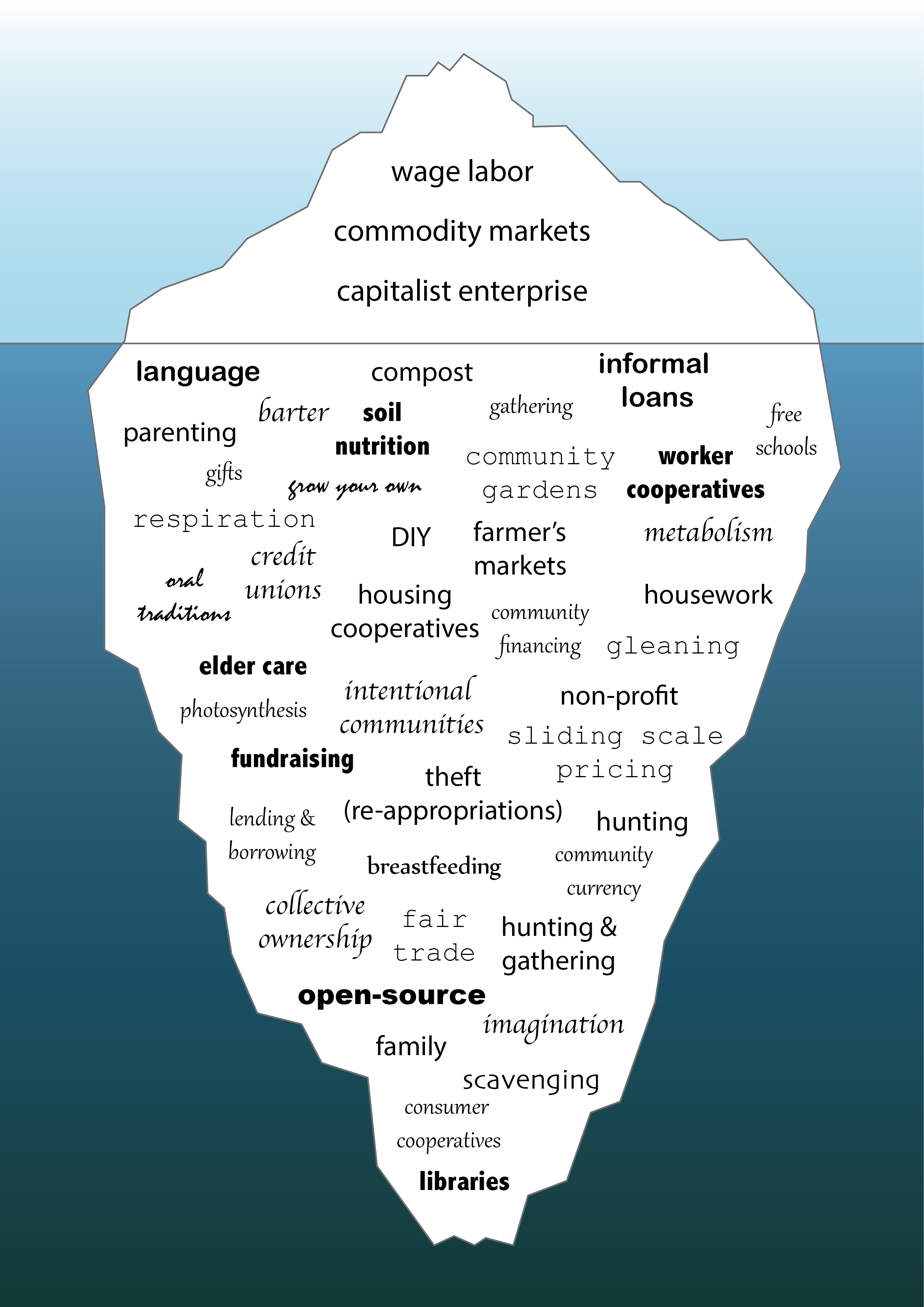
Diverse Economies Iceberg

In both A Postcapitalist Politics and The End of Capitalism (As We Knew It), Gibson-Graham "propose to construct a new 'language of economic diversity'" that will contribute to our understandings of possible economic structures. Building on an anti-essentialist Marxist analysis of capitalism, as well as queer and feminist theory, they argue that capitalism is overdetermined and that there are many non-capitalist economic practices that exist alongside it. As one reviewer notes, Gibson-Graham "rejects the idea that capitalist economies are tightly organized systems" and instead presents the economy as consisting of "many different undertakings, only some of which cluster around market transactions." The "diverse economies iceberg" is a key visual tool used to represent this economic diversity.

This work also related to the development of an anti-essentialist understanding of class, explored in two collections co-edited with Stephen Resnick and Richard Wolff, Class and Its Others and Re/presenting Class: Essays in Postmodern Marxism. This body of work treats class as a historically variable relation, not a fixed, homogeneous identity or subject position.

=== Community Economies ===
Based on the insights from a diverse economies approach, Gibson-Graham elaborated a "politics of possibility" that explores alternatives to exploitative economic practices. These have been termed "community economies" and refer to sustainable and equitable forms of livelihood guided democratically by ethical coordinates. "Community" in this use transcends only human community, to incorporate all life forms, and "economy" refers to "the practices that allow us to survive and care for each other and the earth."

Community economies are framed around a cluster of ethical concerns:

1. Survival: What do we really need to survive well, in balance with the well-being and needs of others and the planet?
2. Surplus: How do we distribute any surplus to enrich social and environmental health?
3. Transactions: How do we conduct ethical encounters with human and non-human others?
4. Consumption: How do we consume sustainably and justly?
5. Commons: What do we share with human and non-human others, and how do we maintain, replenish, and growth this commons?
6. Investment: What do we do with stored wealth? How do we invest this wealth so that future generations may live well?

== Significance ==
J. K. Gibson-Graham are widely cited across multiple disciplines and have provided significant contributions to understandings of community economies and economic geography. The End of Capitalism (As We Knew It) was named a "Classic in Human Geography" by the journal Progress in Human Geography.

In 2010, Gibson-Graham received the Australia-International Medal from the Institute of Australian Geographers. In 2019, they received the Thomas F. Divine Award, "presented annually to someone who over a lifetime has made important contributions to social economics and the social economy."

Katherine Gibson and Julie Graham also established—and published as part of—the Community Economies Collective (CEC), composed of former and current students and collaborators. The Community Economies Research Network (CERN) was established in the 1990s and now has over 400 members. CERN is a network of "activists, artists, practitioners and others who are interested in ways of enacting new visions of economy". Its members meet regularly in geographic clusters to share and discuss work. In 2018, the Community Economies Institute (CEI) was founded as a non-profit organisation to advance "research, education and action around ethical economic practices that acknowledge and act on the interdependence of all life forms, human and nonhuman". In 2024, the CEI was endorsed as a charitable organisation by the Australian Charities and Not-for-profits Commission. Gibson-Graham's work also forms the basis for the Diverse Economies and Liveable Worlds book series published by the University of Minnesota Press.

== Publications ==
=== Books ===
- Gibson-Graham, J. K. (1996). The End of Capitalism (As We Knew It): A Feminist Critique of Political Economy. Cambridge, MA: Blackwell Publishers. ISBN 1-55786-862-X. OCLC 33969935.
- Gibson-Graham, J. K.; Resnick, S.; Wolff, R., eds. (2000). Class and Its Others. Minneapolis: University of Minnesota Press. ISBN 978-0-8166-9178-4. OCLC 232159842.
- Gibson-Graham, J. K.; Resnick, S.; Wolff, R. D., eds. (2001). Re/presenting Class: Essays in Postmodern Marxism. Durham, NC: Duke University Press. ISBN 978-0-8223-2709-7.
- Gibson-Graham, J. K. (2006). A Postcapitalist Politics. Minneapolis: University of Minnesota Press. ISBN 978-0-8166-9843-1. OCLC 191932378.
- Gibson-Graham, J. K.; Cameron, J.; Healy, S. (2013). Take Back the Economy: An Ethical Guide for Transforming our Communities. Minneapolis: University of Minnesota Press. ISBN 978-0-8166-7607-1. OCLC 1518971307.
- Gibson-Graham, J. K.; Dombroski, Kelly, eds. (2020). The Handbook of Diverse Economies. Northampton, MA: Edward Elgar Publishing. ISBN 978-1-78811-995-5. OCLC 1119476345.

=== Articles and chapters ===
- Gibson-Graham, J. K. (1993). "Waiting for the Revolution, or How to Smash Capitalism while Working at Home in Your Spare Time". Rethinking Marxism. 6 (2): 10–24. doi:10.1080/08935699308658052.
- Gibson-Graham, J. K. (October 1994). "Waiting for the Revolution, or How to Smash Capitalism while Working at Home in Your Spare Time". In Callari, Antonio; Cullenberg, Stephen; Biewener, Carol (eds.). Marxism in the Postmodern Age. New York: The Guilford Press. pp. 188–197. ISBN 0-89862-423-1. – Shorter version of the 1993 article
- Gibson-Graham, J. K. (2004). "The Violence of Development: Two political imaginaries". Development. 47 (1): 27–34. doi:10.1057/palgrave.development.1100013.
- Gibson-Graham, J. K. (2008). "Diverse economies: performative practices for 'other worlds'". Progress in Human Geography. 32 (5): 613–632.
- Gibson-Graham, J. K.; Roelvink, Gerda (2010). "An Economic Ethics for the Anthropocene". Antipode. 41 (s1): 320–346.
- Gibson-Graham, J. K. (2011). "A feminist project of belonging for the Anthropocene". Gender, Place & Culture: A Journal of Feminist Geography. 18 (1): 1–21. doi:10.1080/0966369X.2011.535295.
- Gibson-Graham, J. K. (2014). "Rethinking the Economy with Thick Description and Weak Theory". Current Anthropology. 55 (s9): s147–s153.
- Gibson-Graham, J. K.; Cameron, Jenny; Healy, Stephen (2016). "Commoning as postcapitalist politics". In Amin, Ash; Howell, Philip (eds.). Releasing the commons: rethinking the futures of the commons. London: Routledge. pp. 192–212. ISBN 978-1-138-94234-9.

== See also ==
- Community-based economics
