= Brian Tokar =

American environmental activist and author

Brian Tokar is an American environmental activist and author. He is a faculty and board member of the Institute for Social Ecology. From 2006-2022, he served as a lecturer in the Environmental Program at the University of Vermont. He was a member of the Goddard College faculty from 1991-2001. He is a "prominent theorist" in the American green movement according to The Los Angeles Times.

In 1999, Tokar received a Project Censored award for a 1998 investigative piece on the history of Monsanto first published in The Ecologist. (Link to article: https://theecologist.org/1998/sep/01/monsanto-checkered-history) He was a lead organizer of the "Biodevastation/Biojustice" series of events challenging the U.S. Biotechnology industry from 1998-2007 (link: https://social-ecology.org/wp/category/biodev/), and a founding board member of 350Vermont (https://350vt.org), the first local affiliate group of the global 350.org network. His articles on environmental issues and popular movements have appeared frequently in Z Magazine and in web-based publications and sites such as Counterpunch (https://www.counterpunch.org/author/2esakesp/), ZNetwork (https://znetwork.org/author/briantokar/) , Resilience.org, Toward Freedom, and Green Social Thought.

Tokar has also contributed to numerous international collections, including The Routledge Handbook on the Climate Change Movement (2014: https://www.routledge.com/Routledge-Handbook-of-the-Climate-Change-Movement/Dietz-Garrelts/p/book/9781138232235) and Handbook of Climate Justice (2019: https://www.taylorfrancis.com/books/edit/10.4324/9781315537689/routledge-handbook-climate-justice-tahseen-jafry), Climate Justice and the Economy (2018: https://www.routledge.com/Climate-Justice-and-the-Economy-Social-mobilization-knowledge-and-the-political/Jacobsen/p/book/9780367459017), Social Ecology and Social Change (2015: https://lode.press/social-ecology-and-social-change/), Globalism and Localization: Emergent Solutions to Our Ecological and Social Crises (2019: https://www.routledge.com/Globalism-and-Localization-Emergent-Solutions-to-Ecological-and-Social-Crises/Canty/p/book/9780367222611), and Pluriverse: The Post-Development Reader (2019: https://cup.columbia.edu/book/pluriverse/9788193732984/).

== Publications ==
=== Books ===
- The Green Alternative (1987, Revised 1992)
- Earth for Sale (1997) (Added link for full text download: https://social-ecology.org/wp/2025/01/download-tokar-earth-for-sale/)
- Toward Climate Justice: Perspectives on the Climate Crisis and Social Change (2010, Revised 2014)

=== Editor ===
- Redesigning Life?: The Worldwide Challenge to Genetic Engineering (Zed Books, 2001)
- Gene Traders: Biotechnology, World Trade, and the Globalization of Hunger (Toward Freedom, 2004)
- Agriculture and Food in Crisis: Conflict, Resistance and Renewal (co-edited with Fred Magdoff) (Monthly Review Press, 2010)
- Climate Justice and Community Renewal: Resistance and Grassroots Solutions (Routledge 2020) (co-edited with Tamra Gilbertson)
