= Animal–computer interaction =

Field of research

Animal–computer interaction (ACI) is a field of research for the design and use of technology with, for and by animals covering different kinds of animals from wildlife, zoo and domesticated animals in different roles. It emerged from, and was heavily influenced by, the discipline of Human–computer interaction (HCI). As the field expanded, it has become increasingly multi-disciplinary, incorporating techniques and research from disciplines such as artificial intelligence (AI), requirements engineering (RE), and veterinary science.

A central theme of ACI research is establishing how user-centred design approaches and methods from HCI can be adapted to design for animals. Accordingly, many studies seek to adopt 'animal-centred' approaches to design and research.

In her ACI Manifesto (2011), Clara Mancini defines one aim of ACI as understanding "the interaction between animals and computing technology within the contexts in which animals habitually live, are active, and socialise with members of the same or other species, including humans". She additionally proposes three core design goals for the field: enhancing animals' quality of life and wellbeing; supporting animals in the functions assigned to them by humans; and supporting human-animal relationships. Accordingly, some ACI research has given considerable attention to questions of animal ethics, welfare, consent and power.

== Applications ==
Much ACI work focuses on technologies to support communication and relationships between animals and humans. Researchers have investigated digital technologies for dogs, including systems for remote communication with dogs left at home, wearable interactive devices for them, and interfaces for working dogs. They have also explored technology for interactions with other domestic animals, including cats. An increasing focus in the ACI community is investigating the wider context of these technologies and the impact they have beyond the individual animals that use them, from security and privacy considerations of pet wearables, the effect they may have on humans living with these animals, the context they are deployed in, to supporting veterinary science, and animal behavior research.

== Animal internet technologies ==
Recent work in ACI has focused on how internet connected technologies, such as Internet of Things (IoT), can support animals. This includes technologies such as remote video call devices for dogs to call their owners, speculative technologies for dogs to sense their owners and technologies to support dog-to-dog interactions mediated by the internet. Much of this work has focused on how to incorporate interspecies design into the process and what the user experience and what interactive internet systems look like with animal users.

== Conferences ==
The ACI community has organised its flagship conference, the International Conference on Animal-Computer Interaction, as a yearly stand-alone event since 2016 with its proceedings published in the ACM Digital Library. It incorporates doctoral consortia for junior researchers to become acquainted with the field, and co-located workshops to stimulate collaboration on emerging topics.
