= Daniel Singer (journalist) =

Polish-American journalist (1926–2000)

- Born: 26 September 1926; Warsaw, Poland
- Died: 2 December 2000 (aged 74); Paris, France
- Occupation: Journalist
- Spouse: Jeanne Kérel
- Relatives: Bernard Singer, Esther Singer

Daniel Singer (26 September 1926 – 2 December 2000) was a Polish-American socialist writer and journalist. He was best known for his articles for The Nation in the United States and for The Economist in Britain, serving for decades as a European correspondent for each magazine.

Gore Vidal described Singer as "one of the best, and certainly the sanest, interpreters of things European for American readers", with a "Balzacian eye for human detail". Mike Davis labelled Singer "the left's most brilliant arsonist", with a talent for "set[ting] ablaze whole forests of desiccated cliches".

== Biography ==
=== Early life ===
Singer was born in 1926 in Warsaw, in his parents' home. His father, Bernard Singer, was to become a well-known journalist, but was impoverished at the time of Daniel's birth. His mother, Esther Singer, was a teacher, and the child of wealthy Jewish parents. Esther, a Marxist, interested both Daniel and a young Isaac Deutscher in left-wing politics, and specifically the ideas of Karl Marx and Rosa Luxemburg. As Daniel aged, his father became more financially successful, and the family was able to move out of the ghetto. Esther quit her job, and Daniel attended a school where he was the only Jew in his class.

=== Education and escape from Holocaust ===
In 1939, when Nazi Germany invaded Poland, Singer and his sister and mother were staying in southern France. They went to Paris in an attempt to book passage to Warsaw but could not. Instead, after the occupation of Paris by the Germans, Singer and his mother and sister left Paris. They went first to Angers, where he went to the Lycée David d'Angers, then to Toulouse (Lycée Lakanal), and after to Marseille (Lycée Thiers). In the beginning of August 1942, the French police came to arrest them; his sister jumped through the window from the second floor, broke her leg, and was sent to the hospital, while he was away in the countryside with some school friends and learned about his sister coming back home. With the help of the resistance, first Singer and then his mother and sister escaped to Switzerland. Meanwhile, his father was arrested by the Soviet Union, which had occupied eastern Poland under the Molotov–Ribbentrop Pact, and was sent to the gulag for two years and released when the Soviet Union entered the war before being allowed to leave for London.

During the middle of the Second World War, Singer studied philosophy in Geneva. In 1944, he and the remainder of his family joined his father in London, where Daniel obtained his bachelor's degree in economics from the University of London.

=== Journalistic career and marriage ===
Singer began working for The Economist in 1948, with assistance from his old friend Isaac Deutscher, and for the New Statesman in 1949. His work focused on Poland, France, Eastern Europe, and the Soviet Union. He remained on staff with The Economist for 19 years. In this period, he also provided radio and television commentary for the BBC and the CBC. In 1956, Singer married Jeanne Kérel, a French doctoral student in economics in the University of Paris; with a British Council scholarship she spent a year in London in 1952–1953 at the London School of Economics. After their wedding they lived during two years separated. Singer moved to Paris in May 1958 when he was sent as "The Economist correspondent moved to Paris". Singer spent the rest of his life living in Paris, reporting first for The Economist, and then after 1970 for The Nation, and became in 1980 the magazine's European correspondent. He wrote critically of Charles de Gaulle, François Mitterrand, and the French Communist Party but was enthusiastic about the events of May 1968.

=== Death ===
Singer died in 2000 of lung cancer. He requested that the announcement of his death be accompanied by a quotation from Luxemburg, still his political idol, shortly before her execution: "Your order is built on sand. Tomorrow, the revolution will raise its head again, Proclaiming to your horror amidst a blaze of trumpets, 'I was, I am, I always shall be.'" The Daniel Singer Millennium Prize Foundation was established in Singer's name after his death. It offers an annual $2,500 prize for an essay in Singer's spirit.

== Political views ==
Singer's writing was always deeply influenced by his interest in politics, and specifically the process of political change. Throughout his adult life, Singer was a socialist but a critic of the Soviet Union. Influenced by anarchism, Trotskyism, and various newer dissident schools of Marxism, he was devoted ultimately to the political ideas of Marx and Luxemburg. Singer opposed capitalism, saying that he "could not resign himself to the idea that with the technological genius at our disposal we are unable to build a different world." He denied that capitalism's doom is inevitable, writing "capitalism has within it the seeds of its own destruction, but only seeds ... Capitalism will have to be pushed off the stage." Singer believed that this push "will require a revolution".

While Singer was an opponent of Stalinism, and believed the French Communist Party in large part responsible for de Gaulle's success in taking power in 1958 and his failure to be overthrown in 1968, he had a nuanced view on the question. He wrote that "while the totalitarian nature of Stalin's Russia is undeniable, I find the thesis of 'totalitarian twins' both wrong and unproductive, and recognised the deep working-class implantation of the CP." Singer retained an optimism about the prospects for socialism, writing shortly before his death: "There is no certainty about the future. Humanity has the capability of destroying itself, and it may very well do so. The hope is with the younger generation. They will not be able to run away from the problems of the world the way our generation did and the next generation has. But our grandchildren will have to deal with the contradictions."

== Books ==
=== Prelude to Revolution (1970) ===
Prelude to Revolution: France in May 1968, first published by Hill and Wang in 1970, is an account of the student uprising and general strike that shook France and imperiled the Gaullist regime in the spring of 1968. Singer argues that the events of May 1968, while not a revolution, even a failed one, had the potential to overturn a contradictory French society. He argued that they achieved no radical change because the genuine radicals on the non-Communist left had insufficient organisation and influence, while the supposedly radical French Communist Party, with sufficient strength to force fundamental change in the crisis, was not actually interested in doing so. According to Percy Brazil, this is the work which established Singer as "a major political writer". The New Republic wrote of Prelude to Revolution that "if Marx had been living in Paris during May 1968, he might have written this book."

=== The Road to Gdansk (1981) ===
The Road to Gdansk, published by Monthly Review Press in 1981, is a collection of essays on Poland, the Soviet Union, and Solidarity. It was described by Foreign Affairs as "a sharp and stimulating analysis". A review in Russian Review, while praising its discussion of the Soviet Union, observed that "less than a third" of the book is devoted to "a rather superficial analysis" of events in Poland.

=== Is Socialism Doomed? (1988) ===
Is Socialism Doomed? The Meaning of Mitterrand was published by Oxford University Press in 1988. The book dissects the phenomenon of Mitterrand, who came into office as the first socialist president in French history with "the most radical program of any offered in the West by a prospective government in at least thirty years" but by the end of the 1980s had abandoned radicalism and turned the French Socialist Party back into a standard European social democratic party. Singer argued that the disappointment of Mitterrand for socialists demonstrated not that socialism is a futile project but that Mitterrand had not really attempted it.

=== Whose Millennium? (1999) ===
Whose Millennium? Theirs or Ours? was published by Monthly Review Press in 1999. This book, described by Brazil as Singer's "magnum opus", challenges the idea that "there is no alternative" to capitalism. Instead, Singer wrote:

We are at a moment, to borrow [Walt] Whitman's words, when society "is for a while between things ended and things begun," not because of some symbolic date on a calendar marking the turn of the millennium, but because the old order is a-dying, in so far as it can no longer provide answers corresponding to the social needs of our point of development, though it clings successfully to power, because there is no class, no social force ready to push it off the historical stage.

Barbara Ehrenreich described the book as "magisterial in its historical sweep [and] fiercely democratic in its vision", providing "the thinking person's bridge to the 21st Century".

=== Deserter from Death (2005) ===
Deserter from Death: Dispatches from Western Europe 1950–2000, is a posthumous collection of Singer's journalistic writing over the course of his life, published by Nation Books in 2005. It has an introduction by George Steiner and a preface by Howard Zinn. The title comes from a phrase Singer once used to describe himself, referring to his narrow escape from the Holocaust.
