= Stephen Resnick =

American economist (1938–2013)

Stephen A. Resnick
- Born: October 24, 1938
- Died: January 2, 2013 (aged 74)

Academic background
- Education: University of Pennsylvania (B.S., 1960); MIT (Ph.D., 1964)
- Influences: Marx, Althusser, Balibar

Academic work
- School or tradition: Marxian economics
- Institutions: Yale University (1965–71); City College of New York (1971–73); University of Massachusetts Amherst (1973–2013)
- Notable ideas: Marxian economics, economic methodology, class analysis

Stephen Alvin Resnick (/ˈrɛznɪk/; October 24, 1938 – January 2, 2013) was an American Marxist economist. He was well known for his work (much of it written together with Richard D. Wolff) on Marxian economics, economic methodology, and class analysis. His work, along with that of Wolff, is especially associated with a post-Althusserian perspective on political economy.

== Biography ==
Resnick earned a B.S. in economics from the University of Pennsylvania in 1960. He received his Ph.D. in 1964 from the Massachusetts Institute of Technology. His dissertation was an econometric analysis of the European Common Market. His early work (during his tenure at Yale University between 1965 and 1971) was with Stephen Hymer and focused on issues of economic development and international political economy.

After a brief period at the City College of New York (1971–1973), Resnick began teaching at the Economics Department of the University of Massachusetts Amherst in 1973. He began working with Richard D. Wolff in this period, and from then until Resnick's death they published numerous articles and books together, formulating a nondeterminist, class analytical approach. Topics included Marxian theory and value analysis, overdetermination, radical economics, international trade, business cycles, social formations, the Soviet Union, and comparing and contrasting Marxian and non-Marxian economic theories.

Resnick's work with Wolff took Louis Althusser and Étienne Balibar's Reading Capital as its point of departure and developed a very subtle reading of Karl Marx's Capital Volumes II and III in their influential Knowledge and Class. In Resnick's work, Marxian class analysis entails the detailed study of the conditions of existences of concrete forms of performance, appropriation, and distribution of surplus labor. While there could be an infinite number of forms of surplus appropriation, the Marxist canon refers to ancient (independent), slave, feudal, capitalist, and communist class processes.

In 1989, Resnick joined efforts with a group of colleagues, ex- and then current students to launch Rethinking Marxism, an academic journal that aims to create a platform for rethinking and developing Marxian concepts and theories within economics as well as other fields of social inquiry. He remained a member of the editorial board of the journal until 1994, and continued thereafter to serve as a member of the advisory board of the journal.

Resnick continued to teach graduate seminars and undergraduate courses and direct dissertation research in economics at the University of Massachusetts Amherst until 2013. He received multiple teaching awards and taught classes in economic theory, economic development, and economic history. Resnick listed his primary research interests as Marxian theory and economic history and development.

Resnick died on January 2, 2013, as a result of leukemia.

== Bibliography ==
Notable works of Stephen Resnick include:

- Hymer, S., & Resnick, S. (1969). A model of an agrarian economy with nonagricultural activities. The American Economic Review, 59(4), 493–506.
- Richard D. Wolff and Stephen A. Resnick. Economics: Marxian versus Neoclassical (Johns Hopkins Press, Baltimore, 1987).
- Stephen A. Resnick and Richard D. Wolff. Knowledge and Class: A Marxian Critique of Political Economy (University of Chicago Press, Chicago, 1987).
- J.K. Gibson-Graham, Stephen A. Resnick and Richard D. Wolff. Class and Its Others (Minnesota University Press, Minneapolis, 2000).
- J.K. Gibson-Graham, Stephen A. Resnick and Richard D. Wolff. Re/Presenting Class: Essays in Postmodern Marxism (Duke University Press, Durham NC, 2001).
- Stephen A. Resnick and Richard D. Wolff. Class Theory and History: Capitalism and Communism in the USSR (Routledge, NY, 2002).
- Stephen A. Resnick and Richard D. Wolff. New Departures in Marxian Theory (Economics as Social Theory (Routledge, NY, 2006).
- Stephen A. Resnick and Richard D. Wolff. Contending Economic Theories: Neoclassical, Keynesian, and Marxian (The MIT Press, 2012).

== Videos ==
- "Course on Marxian Economics"
- "Course on Socialist Economics"
- "Past Present and Future of the Economics Department" Round table with Resnick, Katzner, Bowles
- "Memorial for Stephen Resnick" Remarks of Richard D. Wolff
- "The POLITICS of OUR 40-YEAR COLLABORATION"

== See also ==
- Paul Hirst
- Barry Hindess
- J. K. Gibson-Graham
