= Rethinking Marxism =

Quarterly academic journal on Marxism

- Discipline: economics, politics, sociology
- Language: English
- Edited by: Yahya M. Madra, Vincent Lyon-Callo

Publication details
- History: 1988—present
- Publisher: Routledge on behalf of the Association for Economic and Social Analysis
- Frequency: Quarterly

Standard abbreviations
- ISO 4: Rethink. Marx.

Indexing
- ISSN: 0893-5696 (print); 1475-8059 (web)
- LCCN: 88658558
- OCLC no.: 472814893

Links
- Journal homepage; Online access; Online archive; Journal page at publisher's website

Rethinking Marxism is a quarterly peer-reviewed academic journal covering Marxist analyses of economics, culture, and society. It was established in 1988 and has been published by Routledge since 2003 on behalf of the Association for Economic and Social Analysis. The editors-in-chief are Yahya M. Madra and Vincent Lyon-Callo.

== History ==
Founded mainly by the professors and graduate students of the Department of Economics at the University of Massachusetts Amherst, the first issue of Rethinking Marxism appeared in 1988, just before the dissolution of the Soviet Union began. The journal quickly became an influential academic platform for Althusserian Marxism in the North American context.

Even though the journal was launched by a group of economists (among others, Stephen Resnick, Richard D. Wolff, Jack Amariglio, David Ruccio) and continues to regularly publish articles in the various sub-fields of Marxist economics, such as the labor theory of value, class analysis, and crisis theory, Rethinking Marxism does not have an exclusive economics focus. It is a journal of Marxist theory that makes it a point to rethink and develop Marxist analyses of capitalism, imperialism and alternatives to capitalism.

Rethinking Marxism is also known for its sustained efforts to showcase contemporary art practices. Each issue of the journal presents an original work by a contemporary artist (e.g., Martha Rosler, Mark Lombardi, Michael Rakowitz, Thomas Hirschhorn, Chto Delat).

From 1989 to 1998, the editor of the journal was Jack Amariglio. From 1998 to 2010, David Ruccio served as editor. He was succeeded by S. Charusheela (2010–2013), Who was then followed by Marcus E. Green and Serap Kayatekin (2013–2019). The current editors of the journal are Yahya M. Madra and Vincent Lyon-Callo.

== Abstracting and indexing ==
This journal is abstracted and indexed in the following databases:

- America: History and Life
- CSA Worldwide Political Science Abstracts
- International Bibliography of the Social Sciences
- VINITI Database RAS
- Scopus
- SocINDEX
