= Paul Sweezy =

American Marxist economist (1910–2004)

Paul M. Sweezy
- Born: April 10, 1910; New York City, New York, U.S.
- Died: February 27, 2004 (aged 93); Larchmont, New York, U.S.

Academic background
- Education: Harvard University (BA, PhD); London School of Economics
- Doctoral advisor: Joseph Schumpeter
- Influences: Karl Marx, Vladimir Lenin, Rosa Luxemburg, Michał Kalecki, Ladislaus Bortkiewicz, Joseph Schumpeter

Academic work
- Discipline: Macroeconomics
- School or tradition: Neo-Marxian economics

Paul Marlor Sweezy (April 10, 1910 – February 27, 2004) was an American Marxist economist, political activist, publisher, and a founding editor of the long-running socialist magazine Monthly Review. He is best remembered for his contributions to economic theory as one of the leading Marxian economists of the second half of the 20th century.

== Biography ==
=== Early years and education ===
Paul Sweezy was born on April 10, 1910, in New York City, the youngest of three sons of Everett B. Sweezy, a vice-president of First National Bank of New York. His mother, Caroline Wilson Sweezy, was a graduate of Goucher College in Baltimore.

Sweezy attended Phillips Exeter Academy and went on to Harvard and was editor of The Harvard Crimson, graduating magna cum laude in 1932. Having completed his undergraduate coursework, his interests shifted from journalism to economics. Sweezy spent the 1931–32 academic year taking courses at the London School of Economics, traveling to Vienna to study on breaks. It was at this time that Sweezy was first exposed to Marxian economic ideas. He made the acquaintance of Harold Laski, Joan Robinson and other young left-wing British thinkers of the day.

Upon his return to the United States, Sweezy again enrolled at Harvard, from which he received his PhD degree in 1937 for a thesis on the "Limitation of the Vend", an English mineowners' cartel, entitled The Limitation of the Vend: A Study in Monopoly and Competition. During his studies, Sweezy became like a son to the Austrian-born economist Joseph Schumpeter, although on an intellectual level, their views were diametrically opposed. Later, as colleagues, their debates on the "Laws of Capitalism" were of legendary status for a generation of Harvard economists.

While at Harvard, Sweezy founded the academic journal The Review of Economic Studies and published essays on imperfect competition, the role of expectations in the determination of supply and demand, and the problem of economic stagnation.

=== Academic career and military service ===
Sweezy became an instructor at Harvard in 1938. It was there that he helped establish a local branch of the American Federation of Teachers, the Harvard Teachers' Union. In this interval also Sweezy wrote lectures that later became one of his most important works of economics, The Theory of Capitalist Development (1942), a book which summarized the labor theory of value of Marx and his followers. The book was the first in English to deal thoroughly with such questions as the transformation problem.

Sweezy worked for several New Deal agencies analyzing the concentration of economic power and the dynamics of monopoly and competition. This research included the influential study for the National Resources Committee, "Interest Groups in the American Economy" which identified the eight most powerful financial-industrial alliances in US business.

From 1942 to 1945, Sweezy worked for the research and analysis division of the Office of Strategic Services. Sweezy was sent to London, where his work for the Office of Strategic Services (OSS) required his monitoring British economic policy for the US government. He went on to edit the OSS's monthly publication European Political Report. Sweezy received the bronze star for his role in the war. He was the recipient of the Social Science Research Council Demobilization Award at war's end. On December 14, 2016, the U.S. Congress "awarded the Congressional Gold Medal collectively to the members of the Office of Strategic Services (OSS) in recognition of their superior and major contributions during World War II".

Sweezy wrote extensively for the liberal press during the post-war period, including such publications as The Nation and The New Republic. He also wrote a book, Socialism, published in 1949, as well as a number of shorter pieces which were collected in book form as The Present as History in 1953. In 1947 Sweezy quit his teaching position at Harvard, with two years remaining on his contract, to dedicate himself to full-time writing and editing.

=== Monthly Review magazine ===
In 1949, Sweezy and Leo Huberman founded a new magazine called Monthly Review, using money from historian and literary critic F. O. Matthiessen. The first issue appeared in May of that year, and included Albert Einstein's article "Why Socialism?". The magazine, established in the midst of the American Red Scare, describes itself as socialist "independent of any political organization".

Monthly Review rapidly expanded into the production of books and pamphlets through its publishing arm, Monthly Review Press.

Over the years, Monthly Review published articles by a diverse array of voices, including material by Albert Einstein, W. E. B. Du Bois, Jean-Paul Sartre, Che Guevara and Joan Robinson.

=== Activism ===
In 1954, New Hampshire Attorney General Louis C. Wyman subpoenaed Sweezy and made inquiries into the contents of a guest lecture at the University of New Hampshire and his political beliefs and associations, demanding to know the names of his political associates. Sweezy refused to comply, citing his First Amendment right of freedom of expression. He was cited for contempt of court and briefly imprisoned, but the US Supreme Court overturned the conviction in a landmark case for academic freedom, in Sweezy v. New Hampshire, 354 U.S. 234 (1957).

Sweezy was active in a wide range of progressive causes, including the Emergency Civil Liberties Committee, the National Lawyers Guild, the National Council of Arts, Sciences and Professions, and the Fair Play for Cuba Committee. He was the chairman of the Committee in Defense of Carl Marzani and was particularly active fighting against the prosecution of members of the Communist Party under the Smith Act.

An outspoken opponent of the Vietnam War, Sweezy was a prominent supporter of Bertrand Russell's International War Crimes Tribunal.

=== Contributions to economics ===
Sweezy's work in economics focused on applying Marxist analysis to what he identified as three dominant trends in modern capitalism: monopolization, stagnation, and financialization.

Sweezy's first formally published paper on economics was an article in the Journal of Political Economy in 1934 entitled "Professor Pigou's Theory of Unemployment". Over the rest of the decade Sweezy wrote prolifically on economics-related topics, publishing some 25 articles and reviews. Sweezy did pioneering work in the fields of expectations and oligopoly in these years, introducing for the first time the concept of the kinked demand curve in the determination of oligopoly pricing.

Harvard published Sweezy's dissertation, Monopoly and Competition in the English Coal Trade, 1550–1850, in 1938. With the 1942 publication of The Theory of Capitalist Development, Sweezy established himself as the "dean of American Marxists" and laid foundations for later Marxist work on these themes. In addition to presenting the first major discussion in English of the "transformation problem", the book also emphasized the "qualitative" as well as "quantitative" aspect of Marx's theory of value, distinguishing Marx's approach from those of his predecessors in political economy.

In 1966, Sweezy published Monopoly Capital: An Essay on the American Economic and Social Order with Paul Baran. The book elaborated evidence for and implications of Sweezy's stagnation theory, also called the theory of secular stagnation. The main dilemma that modern capitalism would face, they argued, would be how to find profitable investment outlets for the economic surpluses created by capital accumulation. Because of the increase in oligopoly, this would take the form of stagnation as monopolistic firms reduced output rather than prices in response to overcapacity.

Oligopoly meant that there was a tendency for the rate of surplus to rise, but this surplus did not necessarily register in statistical records as profits. It also takes the form of waste and excess production capacity.

Increases in marketing, defense spending and various forms of debt could alleviate the problem of overaccumulation. However, they believed that these remedies to capital's difficulties were inherently limited and tend to decrease in effectiveness over time so that monopoly capital would tend toward economic stagnation.

This book is regarded as the cornerstone of Sweezy's contribution to Marxian economics.

Sweezy had dealt with the rise and fall of finance capital in the early 21st century, identifying monopoly as the more essential trend. This formed the context in which he would analyze the resurgence of finance capital in the post-war era. Because Sweezy's approach combined and integrated the micro effects of monopoly with the macro level insights of Keynesian theory, it proved superior for understanding the stagflation of the 1970s. Sweezy's later work with Harry Magdoff examined the importance of "financial explosion" as a response to stagnation.

=== Personal life ===
Sweezy was married three times. He had three children.

His step-son is the film producer and political activist Jeff Dowd, who was put on trial for protesting the Vietnam War as part of the Seattle Liberation Front and later achieved fame as the inspiration for the main character in The Big Lebowski (1998).

=== Death and legacy ===
Paul Sweezy died on February 27, 2004, at the age of 93.

Sweezy was lauded by economist and public intellectual John Kenneth Galbraith as "the most noted American Marxist scholar" of the late 20th Century. He was also called "the best that Exeter and Harvard can produce" and regarded as "among the most promising economists of his generation" by Nobel Prize-winning economist Paul Samuelson.

=== Relevance in 2008 Financial Crash and subsequent years of global economic turmoil ===
Sweezy and Baran's Monopoly Capital once again came into fashion as a guideline for the 2008 financial troubles as surplus productivity was malinvested into the financial sector and financialization of western companies over productive benefits of industry. Post 2008, consolidating corporate powers with aid from United States government policies continue to roll surpluses of productivity into militaristic ventures across the world in order to monopolize more industries such as media, banking, real estate, pharmaceutical, and technology to control pricing across commodities and services and labor.

Sweezy maintained that under monopoly capitalism, the restricting of new investments and declining real wage growth would put pressure on effective demand.

== Works ==
- Monopoly and Competition in the English Coal Trade, 1550–1850. [1938] Westport, CT: Greenwood Press, 1972.
- The Theory of Capitalist Development. London: D. Dobson, 1946.
- Socialism. New York: McGraw-Hill Company, 1949.
- The Present as History: Reviews on Capitalism and Socialism. (1953, 1962).
- Modern Capitalism and Other Essays. New York: Monthly Review Press, 1972.
- The Transition from Feudalism to Capitalism. London: New Left Books, 1976.
- Post-Revolutionary Society: Essays. New York: Monthly Review Press, 1980.
- Four lectures on Marxism. (New York: Monthly Review Press, 1981).
- "The Limits of Imperialism." In Chilcote, Ronald H. (ed.) Imperialism: Theoretical Directions. New York: Humanity Books, 2000.

=== With Leo Huberman ===
- F.O. Matthiessen, 1902–1950. New York: S.N., 1950.
- Cuba: Anatomy of a Revolution. New York: Monthly Review Press, 1960.
- Regis Debray and Latin American Revolution. New York: Monthly Review Press, 1968.
- Socialism in Cuba. New York: Monthly Review Press, 1969.
- The Communist Manifesto after 100 Years: New translation by Paul M. Sweezy of Karl Marx's "The Communist Manifesto" and Friedrich Engels' "Principles of Communism." New York: Modern Reader, 1964.
- Vietnam: The Endless War: From Monthly Review, 1954–1970. New York: Monthly Review Press, 1970.

=== With Harry Magdoff ===
- The Dynamics of US Capitalism: Corporate Structure, Inflation, Credit, Gold, and the Dollar. New York: Monthly Review Press, 1972.
- Revolution and Counter-Revolution in Chile. New York: Monthly Review Press, 1974.
- The End of Prosperity. New York: Monthly Review Press, 1977.
- The Deepening Crisis of US Capitalism. New York: Monthly Review Press, 1981.
- Stagnation and the Financial Explosion. New York: Monthly Review Press, 1987.
- The Irreversible Crisis: Five Essays. New York: Monthly Review Press, 1988.

=== With others ===
- An Economic Program for American Democracy. With Richard V. Gilbert, George H. Hildebrand, Arthur W. Stuart, Maxine Yaple Sweezy, Lorie Tarshis, and John D. Wilson. New York: The Vanguard Press, 1938.
- Monopoly Capital: An Essay on the American Economic and Social Order. With Paul A. Baran. New York: Monthly Review Press, 1966.
- On the Transition to Socialism. With Charles Bettelheim. New York: Monthly Review Press, 1971.

== Bibliography ==
- Fine, Ben (2009), "Enigma in the Origins of Paul Sweezy's Political Economy" (PDF), Review of Political Economy, 21 (1): 157–161, doi:10.1080/09538250802517113, archived from the original (PDF) on 13 November 2024
