= Fritz Pappenheim =

American sociologist (1902–1964)

Fritz Pappenheim (Cologne, 18 May 1902 - Cambridge, Massachusetts, 31 July 1964) was an American sociologist and economist of German Jewish origin.

== Biography ==
Fritz Pappenheim studied economics, sociology, and philosophy at the Universities of Cologne, Kiel, and Freiburg, receiving his PhD in 1929. He worked in the fields of labor and adult education, lecturing regularly and taking part in panel discussions on the Frankfurt radio.

After the Nazis took power in Germany in 1933, he escaped to Spain, where he worked as a freelance writer in Barcelona. In 1939, at the end of the Spanish Civil War, he fled to southern France where he was interned in a concentration camp. Deprived of German citizenship by the Nazis, Pappenheim had great difficulty in getting a passport and visa to the US.

Pappenheim came to the US in 1941, a few months before America’s entrance into World War II, and lived in Cleveland doing settlement work with young people.

From 1945-1952, Pappenheim taught social sciences at Talladega College, where he was appointed professor of economics in 1945.

While he was determined to remain in Alabama, Pappenheim was denied tenure because of his openly Marxist orientation and the couple was forced to leave the South for Cambridge, Massachusetts in 1952, where he wrote The Alienation of Modern Man (Published by the Monthly Review Press). He remained in Cambridge until his death in 1964.
