= Maxine Yaple Sweezy =

American economist (1911–2004)

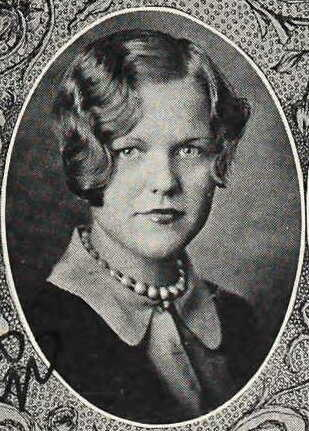
- Born: September 16, 1911; Missouri
- Died: April 29, 2004 (aged 92); Guilford
- Occupation: Economist
- Spouse(s): Paul Sweezy

Maxine Bernard Yaple Sweezy Woolston (September 16, 1911 – April 29, 2004) was an American economist. She is best known for her work The Structure of the Nazi Economy (1941), which introduced the term reprivatization.

== Life and career ==
Maxine Bernard Yaple was born on September 16, 1911 in Missouri. Raised in the Kansas City area, she attended Northeast High School. She earned an A.B. and M.A. from Stanford University in 1934 and 1935 and a PhD from Radcliffe College in 1939.

She was one of six economists who published An Economic Program for American Democracy (1938), which argued for a Keynesian approach of public investment and progressive taxation to spur consumption and stave off economic stagnation.

Her doctoral dissertation, Nazi Economic Policies, was the basis for her book The Structure of the Nazi Economy. Her examination of the Nazi economy was used by the US military to assist in selecting industrial bombing targets during World War II. During the war she worked for the Office of Price Administration and the Foreign Economic Administration.

She was a member of the Philadelphia City Planning Commission from 1945 to 1948 and later worked for them as a consultant. She held faculty positions at Tufts, Vassar, and Bryn Mawr.

Maxine Bernard Yaple Sweezy Woolston died on 29 April 2004 in Guilford, Connecticut.

== Personal life ==
Yaple was married to economist Paul Sweezy and lawyer William Jenks Woolston.

== Bibliography ==
- ‘The Burden of Direct Taxes as Paid by Income Classes’ American Economic Review, 26 (1936): 691–710.
- An Economic Program for American Democracy (1938), with Richard V. Gilbert, George H. Hildebrand Jr., Arthur W. Stuart, Paul M. Sweezy, Lorie Tarshis and John D. Wilson)
- ‘Distribution of Wealth and Income under the Nazis’, Review of Economic Statistics, 21 (1939): 178–84.
- ‘German Corporate Profits: 1926–1938’, Quarterly Journal of Economics, 54 (1940): 384–98.
- The Structure of the Nazi Economy (1941), Harvard Studies in Monopoly and Competition, Boston, MA: Harvard University Press. (1945)
- ‘Medical Care for Everybody?’, American Association of University Women. 1950.
- ‘World Economy and Peace: A Study Guide’, American Association of University Women. 1953.
- (ed.), Basic Information on the American Economy (1953)
