= Brecht Forum =

US Marxist educational and cultural center in Brooklyn, New York

The Brecht Forum was an independent Marxist educational and cultural center in Brooklyn, New York, named after German writer Bertolt Brecht. Throughout the years, the Forum offered a wide-ranging program of classes, public lectures and seminars, art exhibitions, performances, popular education workshops, and language classes.

The Brecht Forum closed in 2014. Many of the teachers and activists from the Forum have continued offering classes and discussions through the Marxist Education Project, which was founded following the Forum's closure and operates out of the Brooklyn Commons in the Boerum Hill neighborhood.

== History ==
The Brecht Forum was founded in 1975, as the New York Marxist School by a collective of civil rights, community, labor, and student activists. It was named after Bertolt Brecht, who once argued that those who fight for Communism must be able to both fight and renounce fighting. Brecht Forum has been described as one of the governing directorate of the subculture that emerged out of New York's complex Marxist underworld.

In 2004, it moved to Westbeth, 451 West St., New York, NY, formerly Serge’s Gym where its program also included the Theater of the Oppressed Laboratory, the Institute for Popular Education, and Neues Kabarett series. In 2012, it moved to the Commons in Brooklyn at 338 Atlantic Avenue, where its successor organization, the Marxist Education Project, now hosts many events each year. The Brecht Forum's website is being maintained as an archive at brechtforum.net. The site contains videos and audio recordings of programs over its close to 40-year history. Additional archival material is gradually being digitized and added to the site.

At the Brecht Forum, people communicate, meet, and display their art.

== 2008 financial crisis discussion ==
On October 6, 2008, a discussion panel "An Offer We Can’t Refuse?" was held on the 2008 financial crisis included Naomi Klein, Arun Gupta, Frances Fox Piven, William Greider, and Doug Henwood. In the discussion moderated by Christopher Hayes, the panel of progressive intellectuals and activists proposed radical solutions in response to the crisis.
