= Interspecies design =

Design approach emphasizing relationships and interactions between multiple species

Interspecies design is design practice that intentionally involves and emphasizes the contributions of multiple species, focusing on the participation and outcomes for both human and non-human lifeforms. It aims to create a mutual benefit and centers on designing for and with all life. Due to how encompassing it is, interspecies design does not fall into the binaries of a natural environment or a built environment, but rather is a combination of the two.

== Definition ==
Interspecies design is characterized by the participation of more than one species in design activities and the use of design outcomes by multiple species. This concept extends to all design practices that could potentially involve multiple species, making it a broad and inclusive field.

== Need and ethics ==
The field arises from a need to include all those at risk of harm, domination, or oppression in the design process, highlighting the ethical dimension of design decisions. This approach challenges traditional practices by considering the impact on and inclusion of non-human species.

== Synonyms and related concepts ==
Interspecies design is related to but distinct from concepts such as interspecies cultures, multispecies design, ecocentric design, ecological engineering, and more-than-human design.

== Application in art and design ==
In the realm of art and design, interspecies design has been applied in creating shared spaces and experiences for multiple species, such as in the design of prosthetic habitat-structures for owls.

== See also ==
- Animal-computer interaction
- Human–animal studies
- Ecological design
- Environmental ethics
