= Cosmology (disambiguation) =

Cosmology is a term referring to the study of the universe, from either scientific, philosophical, or religious perspectives. The term is also often applied to the underlying model of such a system.

Cosmology may also refer to:

- Physical cosmology, the scientific study of the origin, evolution, large-scale structures, dynamics and fate of the universe
  - Observational cosmology, the study of the structure, evolution and origin of the universe through observation
- Philosophical cosmology, a branch of philosophy that ponders the universe
- Religious cosmology, a way of explaining the origin, history, and evolution of the universe based on religious traditions
  - Biblical cosmology
  - Buddhist cosmology
  - Hindu cosmology
  - Jain cosmology
- Cosmology (album), 2010 album by Rolo Tomasi
- "Cosmology", a song by Moka Only from the 2015 album Magickal Weirdness
- Cosmology (textbook), 2008 book by Steven Weinberg
- Cosmology (The Urantia Book), cosmological and metaphysical concept outlined in The Urantia Book
- Cosmology@Home, BOINC volunteer computing project
