= Ladislaus Bortkiewicz =

Russian economist and statistician

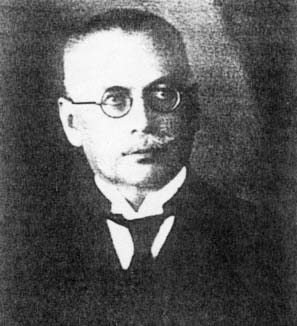
- Born: Ladislaus Josephovich Bortkiewicz; 7 August 1868; Saint Petersburg, Imperial Russia
- Died: 15 July 1931 (aged 62); Berlin, Germany
- Education: University of Strasbourg, Habilitation 1895; University of Göttingen, Ph.D. 1892; University of Saint Petersburg 1890
- Known for: Poisson distribution Transformation problem
- Scientific career
- Fields: Economist, Statistician
- Workplaces: University of Berlin 1901–31 Professor; Alexandrowskii Lyceum 1899–1900; Russian Railways 1897–01; University of Strasbourg, 1895–1897 Privatdozent
- Thesis: Die mittlere Lebensdauer: Die Methoden ihrer Bestimmung und ihr Verhältnis zur Sterblichkeitsmessung (1892)
- Doctoral advisor: Georg Friedrich Knapp (Habil.); Wilhelm Lexis (Ph.D.)
- Doctoral students: Wassily Leontief

Ladislaus Josephovich Bortkiewicz (Russian Владислав Иосифович Борткевич, German Ladislaus von Bortkiewicz or Ladislaus von Bortkewitsch) (7 August 1868 – 15 July 1931) was a Russian economist and statistician of Polish ancestry. He wrote a book showing how the Poisson distribution, a discrete probability distribution, can be useful in applied statistics, and he made contributions to mathematical economics. He lived most of his professional life in Germany, where he taught at Strassburg University (Privatdozent, 1895–1897) and Berlin University (1901–1931).

== Life and work ==
Ladislaus Bortkiewicz was born in Saint Petersburg, Imperial Russia, to two ethnic Polish parents: Józef Bortkiewicz and Helena Bortkiewicz (née Rokicka). His father was a Polish nobleman who served in the Russian Imperial Army.

Bortkiewicz graduated from the Law Faculty in 1890. In 1898 he published a book about the Poisson distribution, titled The Law of Small Numbers. In this book he first noted that events with low frequency in a large population follow a Poisson distribution even when the probabilities of the events varied. It was that book that made the Prussian horse-kicking data famous. The data gave the number of soldiers killed by being kicked by a horse each year in each of 14 cavalry corps over a 20-year period. Bortkiewicz showed that those numbers followed a Poisson distribution. The book also examined data on child-suicides. Some have suggested that the Poisson distribution should have been named the "Bortkiewicz distribution."

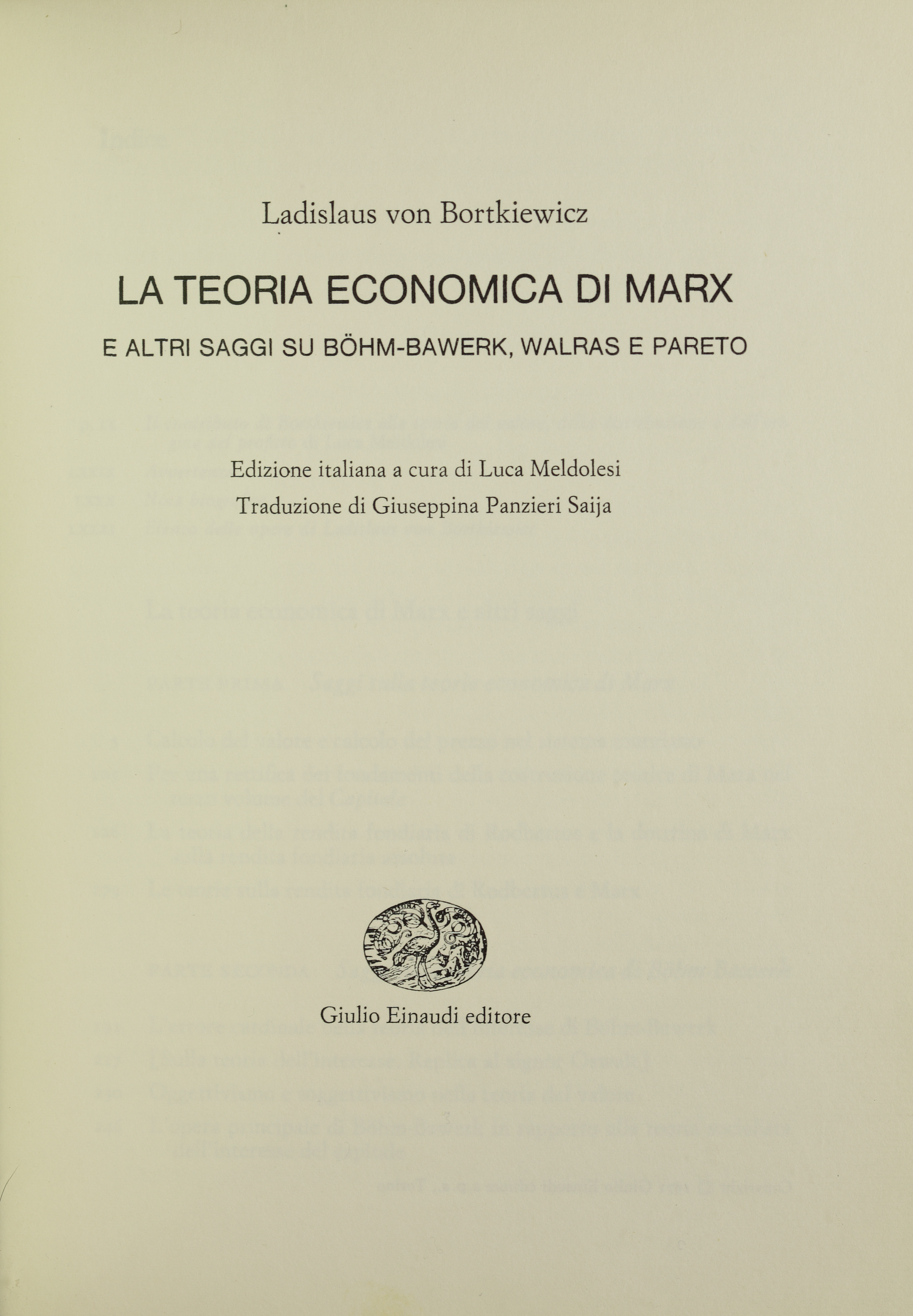
Bortkiewicz' 1971 book The economic theory of Marx

In political economy, Bortkiewicz is important for his analysis of Karl Marx's reproduction schema in the last two volumes of Capital. Bortkiewicz identified a transformation problem in Marx's work. Making use of Dmitriev's analysis of Ricardo, Bortkiewicz proved that the data used by Marx was sufficient to calculate the general profit rate and relative prices. Though Marx's transformation procedure was not correct—because it did not calculate prices and profit rate simultaneously, but sequentially—Bortkiewicz has shown that it is possible to get the correct results using the Marxian framework, i.e. using the Marxian variables constant capital and variable capital it is possible to obtain the profit rate and the relative prices in a three-sector model. This "correction of the Marxian system" has been the great contribution of Bortkiewicz to classical and Marxian economics but it was completely unnoticed until Paul Sweezy's 1942 book "Theory of Capitalist Development". Piero Sraffa (1960) has provided the complete generalization of the simultaneous method for classical and Marxian analysis.

Bortkiewicz died in Berlin, Germany. His papers, including a voluminous correspondence file (some 1,000 letters 1876–1931), were deposited at Uppsala University in Sweden, except for his correspondence with Léon Walras which went into the collection of the Walras scholar William Jaffé in the USA.

== Major publications ==
- Die mittlere Lebensdauer. Die Methoden ihrer Bestimmung und ihr Verhältnis zur Sterblichkeitsmessung. Gustav Fischer, Jena 1893 (Göttinger Digitalisierungszentrum)
- "Review of Léon Walras, Éléments d'économie politique pure, 2e édit.", 1890, Revue d'économie politique
- Ladislaus Bortkiewicz (1898). Das Gesetz der kleinen Zahlen (PDF). Leipzig: B.G. Teubner.
- Ladislaus von Bortkiewicz (1906). "Wertrechnung und Preisrechnung im Marxschen System (1)" (PDF). Archiv für Sozialwissenschaft und Sozialpolitik. 23: 1–50.
- Ladislaus von Bortkiewicz (1907). "Wertrechnung und Preisrechnung im Marxschen System (2)" (PDF). Archiv für Sozialwissenschaft und Sozialpolitik. 25: 10–51. — Article's English translation (Value and Price in the Marxian System), 1952, International Economic Papers, No.2
- Ladislaus von Bortkiewicz (1907). "Wertrechnung und Preisrechnung im Marxschen System (3)" (PDF). Archiv für Sozialwissenschaft und Sozialpolitik. 25: 455–488.
- Ladislaus von Bortkiewicz (1949). "On the Correction of Marx's Fundamental Theoretical Construction in the Third Volume of Capital" (PDF). In Paul M. Sweezy (ed.). Karl Marx and the Close of his System. New York: Augustus M. Kelley. pp. 197–221. — Spanish version 1917 * Original German version
- Ladislaus Bortkiewicz (1917). Die Iterationen — Ein Beitrag zur Wahrscheinlichkeitstheorie. Berlin: Springer. Archived from the original on May 10, 2017.
- "Die Rodbertus'sche Grundrententheorie und die Marx'sche Lehre von der absoluten Grundrente", from: "Archiv für die Geschichte des Sozialismus und der Arbeiterbewegung", 1910–11
