= Leo Huberman =

American socialist economist (1903-1968)

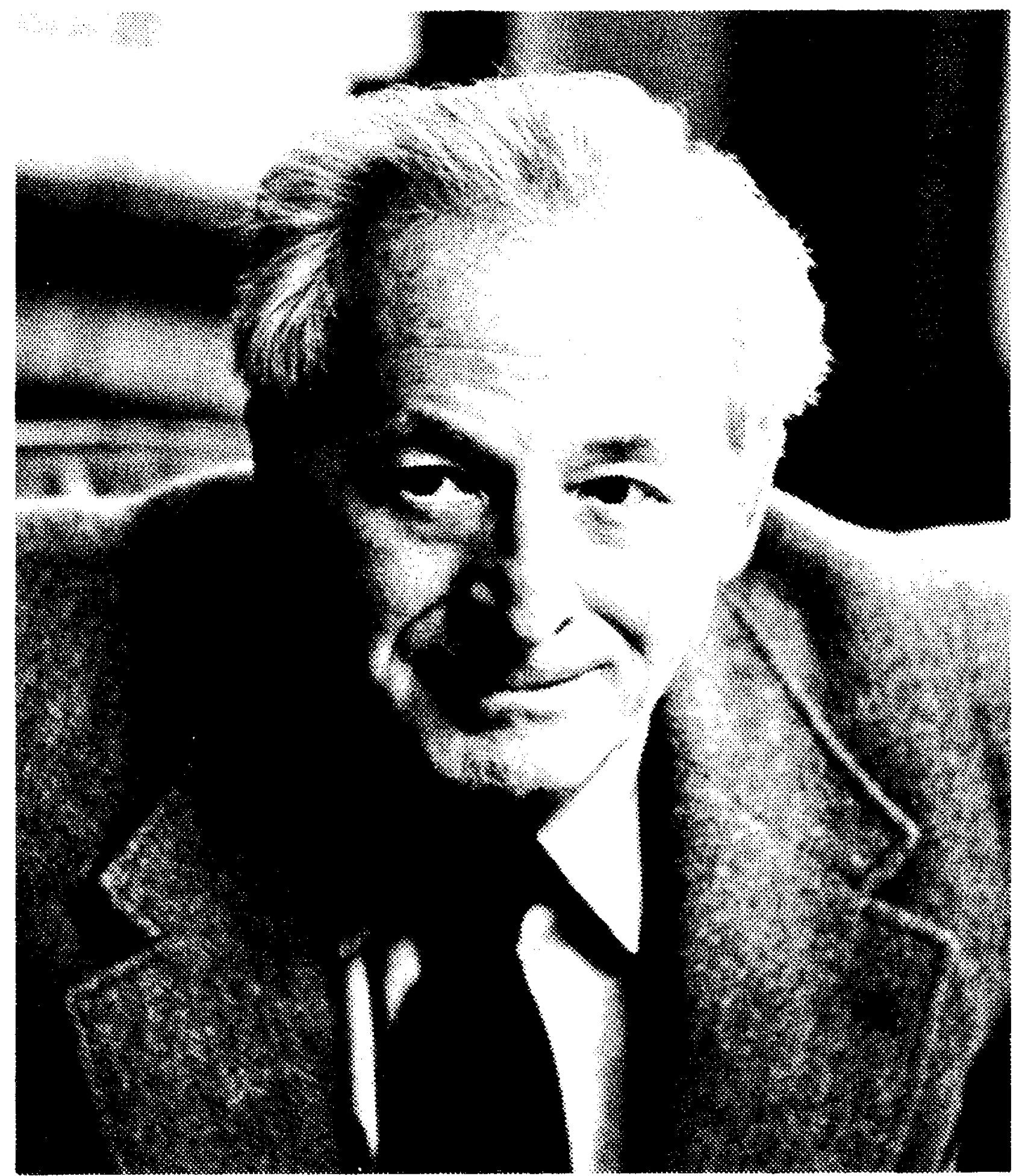
- Born: October 17, 1903; Newark, New Jersey
- Died: November 9, 1968 (aged 65); Paris, France
- Education: New York University
- Occupation: Economist
- Spouse: Gertrude Heller (m. 1925)

Leo Huberman (October 17, 1903 – November 9, 1968) was an American socialist economist. In 1949 he founded and co-edited Monthly Review with Paul Sweezy. He was the chair of the Department of Social Science at New College, Columbia University; labor editor of the newspaper PM; and the author of the popular history books Man’s Worldly Goods and We, the People: The Drama of America.

== Life ==
The next-to-youngest of eleven children of Joseph and Fannie Kramerman-Huberman he was born and grew up in Newark, New Jersey. Six of his siblings died in infancy. From the age of eleven he studied at Newark State School, as well as supporting the family by working in a celluloid factory, as an electrician's mate and in the post office. After graduating from high school in 1926, he spent two years at Newark State Normal School, where he received a teacher’s diploma and started teaching in the elementary schools at the age of eighteen. He served as a teacher at a private experimental school until 1932.

In 1925, he married a high school classmate, fellow teacher Gertrude Heller. For their honeymoon they hitch-hiked across the country to California and back to New Jersey.

His first book We the People was published in London and he gained a place at the London School of Economics. He later attended New York University and completed a science degree in 1937. He held a post at Columbia University in the Faculty of Social Sciences. From 1940, he became editor and columnist for the magazine U.S. Week. In 1949, with Paul Sweezy and backed by F. O. Mathiessen, he founded the left-wing magazine Monthly Review, and became its chief editor.

He continued to write and publish on socialist topics until his death from a heart attack in Paris in 1968.

== Works ==
Man’s Worldly Goods: The Story of The Wealth of Nations , and We The People: The Drama of America were initially written for young people but were revised for an adult audience.

=== Books ===
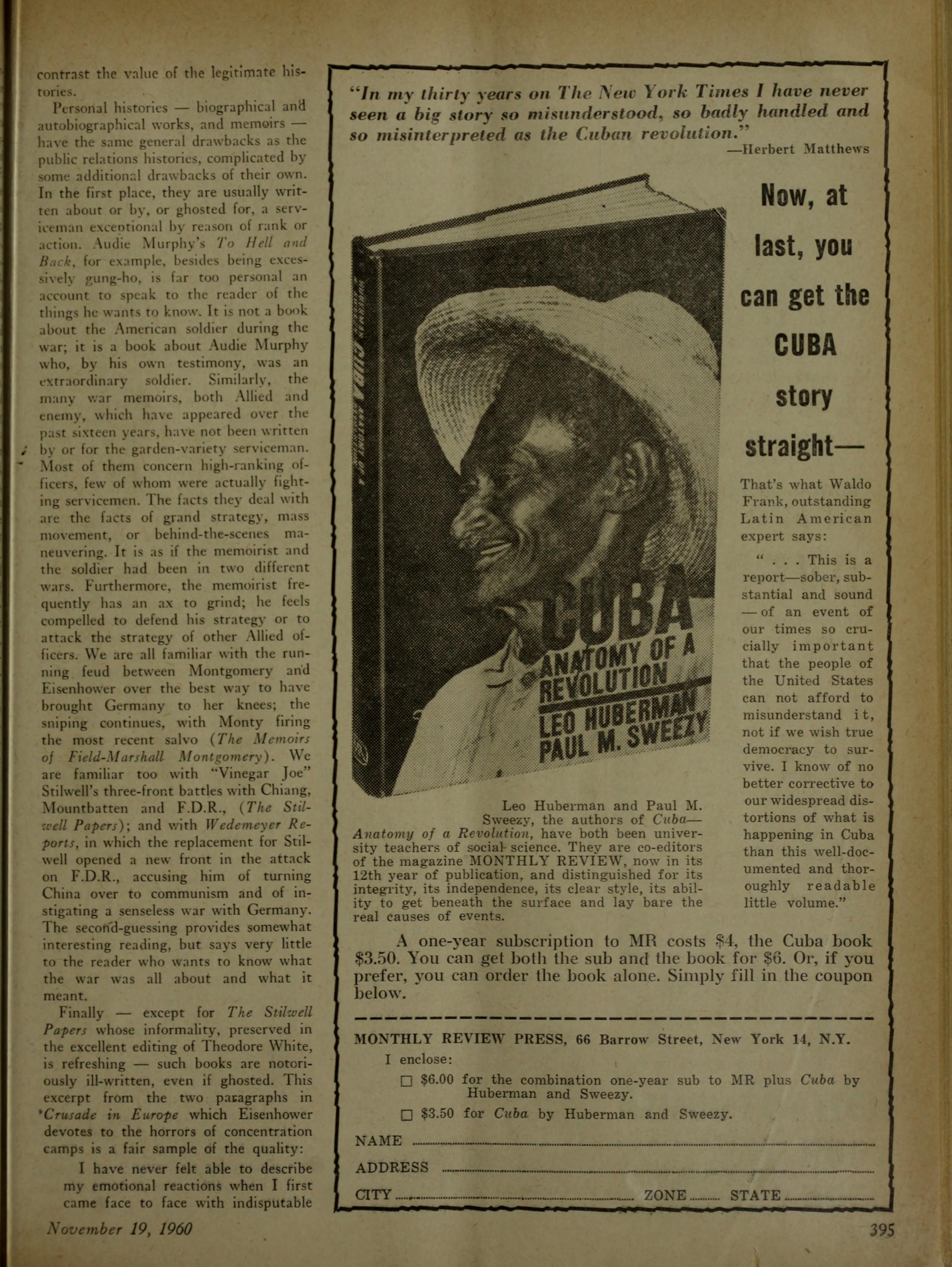
"Cuba, Anatomy of a Revolution" (The Nation, 1960).

- Huberman, Leo (1932). We, the People: the Drama of America. New York: Monthly Review Press. ISBN 0853451346.
- Huberman, Leo (1936). Capital and Proletariat: Origin and Development. New York.
- Huberman, Leo (1936). Man's Worldly Goods: The Story of The Wealth of Nations. Read Books. ISBN 1406798207.
- Huberman, Leo (1937). The Labor Spy Racket. New York: Modern Age Books.
- Huberman, Leo (1941). The Great Bus Strike. New York: Modern Age Books.
- Huberman, Leo (1950). The Truth About Socialism. New York: Lear Publishers.
- Huberman, Leo (1952). Man's Worldly Goods. New York: Monthly Review Press.
- Huberman, Leo (1953). The ABC of Socialism. New York: Monthly Review Press.
- Huberman, Leo (1960). Cuba: Anatomy of a Revolution. New York: Monthly Review Press.
- Huberman, Leo; Sweeney, Paul M. (1965). Revolution and Counterrevolution in the Dominican Republic: Why the U.S. Invaded. Boston, MA: New England Free Press.
- Huberman, Leo (1967). The Cultural Revolution in China: A Socialist Analysis. Boston, MA: New England Free Press.
- Huberman, Leo (1970). Vietnam: The Endless War. New York: Monthly Review Press.
- Huberman, Leo; Sweeney, Paul M. (1970). Socialism in Cuba. New York: Monthly Review Press.

=== Articles ===
- Huberman, Leo (1968). "Cuba: A revolution revisited". Monthly Review. 12 (8).
