= Monthly Review =

American socialist magazine founded in 1949

- Editor: John Bellamy Foster
- Categories: Communism, Marxism, socialism, political economy, economics, social science, philosophy
- Frequency: Monthly (double issue July–August)
- Publisher: Monthly Review Foundation
- Founded: 1949
- Country: United States
- Based in: New York City
- Language: English
- Website: monthlyreview.org
- ISSN: 0027-0520
- OCLC: 241373379

The Monthly Review is an independent socialist magazine published monthly in New York City. Founded in 1949, it is the longest continuously published socialist magazine in the U.S. From its beginning, Monthly Review was characterized as having "a nondoctrinaire approach to socialism" that became increasingly critical of the Soviet Union. The magazine was most closely linked to Third World socialism and national liberation struggles, and consequently saw its popularity grow among the New Left during the Vietnam War.

== History ==
=== Establishment ===
Following the failure of Progressive Party candidate Henry A. Wallace in the 1948 presidential election, two former Wallace supporters, and ex-Harvard colleagues, met on a New Hampshire farm where one of them was living. The two men were literary scholar and Christian socialist F. O. "Matty" Matthiessen and Marxist economist Paul Sweezy. Matthiessen, who came into an inheritance after his father died in a car accident in California, had no pressing need for the inheritance money. He offered Sweezy to underwrite "that magazine [Sweezy] and Leo Huberman were always talking about" by committing the sum of $5,000 per year for three years.

While Matthiessen was the angel investor of the new publication, the editorial responsibilities were handled by Sweezy and his friend Leo Huberman. The latter was a New York University-educated author of left-wing books and pamphlets during the 1930s and '40s. He worked full-time on the Monthly Review from its establishment until his death of a heart attack in 1968.

Sweezy and Huberman were complementary figures guiding the publication. Sweezy's theoretical bent and writing ability were put to use for a majority of the editorial content; Huberman took charge of the business and administrative aspects of the enterprise. Sweezy remained at home in New Hampshire, traveling to New York City once a month to read manuscripts, whereas Huberman conducted the magazine's day-to-day operations along with his wife, Gertrude Huberman, and family friend Sybil Huntington May.

Briefly joining Sweezy and Huberman as a third founding editor of Monthly Review — although not listed as such on the publication's masthead — was German émigré Otto Nathan (1893–1987). While his time with the magazine was short, he was instrumental in obtaining the lead piece for the debut May 1949 issue: Albert Einstein's essay "Why Socialism?". Another key contributor during the magazine's first 15 years was economist Paul Baran, frequently considered as the third member of an editorial troika including Sweezy and Huberman.

Monthly Review launched in 1949 with only 450 subscribers, most of whom were acquaintances of Huberman or Sweezy. The magazine's ideology and readership paralleled that of the independent socialist weekly newspaper The National Guardian, established in 1948. Despite a prevailing conservative political climate in the U.S., Monthly Review quickly reached a critical mass of subscribers, with its paid circulation rising to 2,500 in 1950, and to 6,000 by mid-decade.

=== McCarthy period ===
During the McCarthyism era in the early 1950s, editors Sweezy and Huberman were targeted for "subversive activities". Sweezy was teaching then at the University of New Hampshire. After being subpoenaed by New Hampshire Attorney General Louis C. Wyman, Sweezy refused to answer questions about his lecture notes or political beliefs. He was found in contempt of court. He appealed the conviction to the U.S. Supreme Court, which ruled in his favor in Sweezy v. New Hampshire.

In the 1950s, Monthly Review deviated from its non-graphic look by featuring labor cartoonist Fred Wright. The magazine added veteran radical Scott Nearing to its ranks in 1953. For nearly 20 years, he authored a column titled "World Events". Throughout the Truman and Eisenhower administrations, the magazine published a variety of left-wing intellectuals such as pacifist activist Staughton Lynd (1952), historian William Appleman Williams (1952), and sociologist C. Wright Mills (1958).

=== New Left era and after ===
In the mid-1960s, radical political theory experienced a resurgence with the rise of the New Left in North America and Europe. Monthly Review rose in popularity with this resurgence. While remaining an intellectual magazine not oriented towards mass readership, its circulation nonetheless climbed over the next decade, approaching 9,100 in 1970 before peaking at 11,500 in 1977.

Although Monthly Review had roots in the so-called "Old Left", it was not unsympathetic to the young radical movement which grew in conjunction with the Civil Rights Movement, and with the opposition to conscription and the Vietnam War. Among those associated with the 1960s New Left, and published by Monthly Review, were C. Wright Mills, Herbert Marcuse, Todd Gitlin, Carl Oglesby, David Horowitz, James Weinstein, and Noam Chomsky.

The magazine's editorial staff was joined in May 1969 by radical economist Harry Magdoff, replacing Leo Huberman, who had died the previous year. Magdoff—author of The Age of Imperialism and an MR reader since its inception in 1949—bolstered the already well-developed anti-imperialist, "Third-Worldist" orientation of the publication that was fueled by revolutionary events in Cuba, China, and Vietnam. A Maoist influence also made itself felt in the magazine's content from this period.

Monthly Review sided with the New Left in condemning the Soviet invasion of Czechoslovakia in 1968. The magazine also denounced the suppression of the Polish trade union "Solidarity" through martial law in 1981. In the latter case, Sweezy declared that the incident proved beyond doubt that "the Communist regimes of the Soviet bloc have become the expression and the guardians of a new rigidified hierarchical structure which has nothing in common with the kind of socialist society Marxists have always regarded as the goal of modern working class movements."

With the weakening of the American Left in the 1980s, Monthly Review's circulation dropped from its peak levels back to the 8,000 range. In 1983, the magazine suffered its most severe financial crisis. As Robert McChesney writes, "the combination of recession, inflation, sharply higher printing costs, and declining circulation" resulted in an emergency appeal to subscribers, which successfully raised $100,000 to stave off insolvency.

In 1997, Sweezy and Magdoff were joined on the MR editorial staff by Ellen Meiksins Wood. She was a former New Left Review board member and author of The Retreat from Class (1986). She stayed on as co-editor until 2000 when Robert McChesney and John Bellamy Foster assumed primary editorial duties. McChesney remained in the role until 2004.

=== Publication today ===
Since 2000, John Bellamy Foster has been Monthly Review editor, with Sarah Kramer serving as assistant editor, and Brett Clark as associate editor.

Monthly Review is still published as a print magazine, offering 11 issues per year (one per month, with July and August combined into a single issue). Each issue generally features original content, including full articles, book reviews, and poetry, with exceptions such as reprises or adaptations of previously published work. Everything in the current print version is freely available on the magazine's website. Archived issues going back to 1949 are only available to subscribers. In addition to posting magazine content, the MR website hosts Monthly Review Press and MR Online.

== Political orientation ==
From its first issue, Monthly Review attacked the premise that capitalism was capable of infinite growth through Keynesian macroeconomic fine-tuning. Instead, the magazine's editors and contributors adhered to the Marxist perspective that capitalist economies contain internal contradictions which will ultimately lead to their collapse and reconstitution on a new socialist basis.

Topics of editorial concern in Monthly Review have included poverty, and unequal distribution of wealth and income. Although not averse to discussing esoteric matters of socialist theory, the magazine was characterized by a preference for real-world economic and historical analysis, rather than doctrinaire citations of Marxist canon. Readability was emphasized and the use of academic jargon discouraged. Paul Buhle said of Huberman and Sweezy:

They urgently wanted to make Socialist ideas in the USA comprehensible, to render them less dependent upon emotional loyalties to Russia and the special pleading of Marxism-Leninism and more reliant upon historical and political analysis. Monthly Review reached mostly committed radicals, but those of a notably intellectual bent.

MR's editors argued that massive American military spending was an integral part of capitalist stabilization, that it drove corporate profits, bolstered levels of employment, and absorbed surplus production. They further argued that the illusion of an external threat to national security was necessary to sustain the spending priorities in Washington. In response, the editors challenged, via the material published in the magazine, the dominant Cold War paradigm of "Democracy versus Communism".

In its early years, Monthly Review offered qualified support for the Soviet Union. Over time, however, the magazine became increasingly critical of Soviet dedication to "socialism in one country" and peaceful coexistence with the West, and began to regard the Soviets as playing a more or less conservative role in a world marked by national revolutionary movements. After the Sino-Soviet split of the 1960s, Sweezy and Huberman came to view the People's Republic of China as the actual center of the world revolutionary movement.

Monthly Review never aligned with any specific political organization. The bulk of its articles were written by academics, journalists, and freelance public intellectuals, such as Tariq Ali, Isabel Allende, Samir Amin, Julian Bond, Marilyn Buck, G. D. H. Cole, Bernardine Dohrn, W. E. B. Du Bois, Barbara Ehrenreich, Albert Einstein, Andre Gunder Frank, Eduardo Galeano, Che Guevara, Lorraine Hansberry, David Harvey, Edward S. Herman, Eric Hobsbawm, Michael Klare, Saul Landau, Michael Parenti, Robert W. McChesney, Ralph Miliband, Marge Piercy, Frances Fox Piven, Adrienne Rich, Jean-Paul Sartre, Daniel Singer, E. P. Thompson, Immanuel Wallerstein, and Raymond Williams.

In 2004, MR editor John Bellamy Foster told The New York Times: "The Monthly Review... was and is Marxist, but did not hew to the party line or get into sectarian struggles."

== MR Online ==
From 2005 to 2016, Monthly Review published an associated website, MRzine. At its closure, Monthly Review announced that it would maintain an online archive of the site.

In 2017, MRzine was replaced by MR Online, which is described as "a forum for collaboration and communication between radical activists, writers, and scholars around the world." The site frequently republishes online articles from other sites identified at the start of the post, and then concludes with a disclaimer by the editors indicating that "Monthly Review does not necessarily adhere to all of the views conveyed in articles republished at MR Online. Our goal is to share a variety of left perspectives that we think our readers will find interesting or useful."

=== Persecution of Uyghurs in China ===
In 2020, MR Online republished the outline of a report by the Qiao Collective that disputed allegations of genocide and slavery in China's persecution of Uyghur Muslim minorities in Xinjiang and suggested that "the politicization of China’s anti-terrorism policies in Xinjiang is another front of the U.S.-led hybrid war on China". In response, a leftist organization named Critical China Scholars wrote an open letter to Monthly Review criticizing MR Online's stance. The lead author of the letter was David Brophy, a historian of China at the University of Sydney. Darren Byler, one of the signatories, said he hoped the letter would make it "difficult for leftist 'scholar-activists' to continue to promote Xinjiang-related disinformation."

== Editors ==
Monthly Review magazine has had six editors listed on its masthead:

- Paul Sweezy from 1949 to his death in 2004
- Leo Huberman from 1949 to his death in 1968
- Harry Magdoff from 1969 to his death in 2006
- Ellen Meiksins Wood, 1997–2000
- Robert W. McChesney, 2000–2004
- John Bellamy Foster, May 2000–present

Harry Braverman became director of Monthly Review Press in 1967. He was succeeded by economist Michael D. Yates.

== Non-English editions ==
In addition to the U.S.-based magazine, there are seven sister editions of Monthly Review. They are published in Greece; Turkey; Spain; South Korea; as well as separate English, Hindi, and Bengali editions in India.

== Monthly Review Press ==
Monthly Review Press, an allied endeavor, was launched in 1951 in response to the inability of left-wing journalist I. F. Stone to find a publisher for his book The Hidden History of the Korean War. Stone's work, which argued that the ongoing armed conflict was not simply a case of Communist military aggression but rather the product of North Korean political isolation, South Korean military buildup, and border provocations, became the first title offered by the new publisher in 1952.

Harry Braverman (author of Labor and Monopoly Capital) became director of Monthly Review Press in 1967. Monthly Review Press is also the U.S. publisher of The Socialist Register, an annual British anthology since 1964 of leftist essays.

Among the notable books published by Monthly Review Press in the 1970s and '80s were:

- Open Veins of Latin America (English translation) by Eduardo Galeano (1973)
- Puerto Rican Obituary by Pedro Pietri (1973)
- Spiks by Pedro Juan Soto (1974)
- The Arabs in Israel by Sabri Jiryis (1976)

In later years, Monthly Review Press published titles such as Discourse on Colonialism by Aimé Césaire (1995).

In the 21st century, MR editor John Bellamy Foster embraced a form of "Degrowth" theory when he authored a series of Monthly Review Press books including The Dialectics of Ecology: Socialism and Nature (2024).

== Abstracting and indexing ==
According to the Journal Citation Reports, the print edition of Monthly Review had a 2023 impact factor of 1.0, ranking it 185th out of 318 publications in the "Political Science" category.
