= Class analysis =

Research based on the concept of social class

Class analysis is research in sociology, politics and economics from the point of view of the stratification of the society into dynamic classes. It implies that there is no universal or uniform social outlook, rather that there are fundamental conflicts that exist inherent to how society is currently organized. The most well-known examples are the theories of Karl Marx and Max Weber's three-component theory of stratification.

== Barrington Moore and political development ==
In a non-Marxist sense, class analysis is a theory of political development, in which political regimes and systems are said to be shaped by the social class structure of the country. The main advocate for this theory is political scientist Barrington Moore Jr. In Moore's theory, Great Britain gradually attained a stable democratic governance, compared to neighboring countries such as France and Germany, due to the rapid displacement of peasantry during the enclosure movement which fully transformed Britain into an advanced, industrial society with a strong bourgeois class, which Moore sees as indispensable for a lasting liberal democracy. In contrast, France had a large peasantry that is stationary on land yet politically volatile, leading to the alternating between violent revolutions and monarchical reactions.

== Class size ==
Sociologist Erik Olin Wright splits class analysis into macro and micro levels. The foundation of class analysis on a macro level can be identified with class structure. Examples of such class structure in a macro level can be analyzed within a firm, city, country, or the entire world. On a micro level, class analysis focuses on the effects that the class may have on an individual. Erik Olin Wright exclaims examples of this to be: "Analyses of labor market strategies of unskilled workers, or the effects of technological change on class consciousness, or political contributions of corporate executives". Macro and micro level events can correlate with one another through different perspectives. Wright proclaims that macro level events are not created and set on one large effect, but instead processed through multiple individuals in a very intricate and complex pattern. He dictates that macro class size events are endorsed by an embodiment of multiple micro class events. He also states the opposite effect each size has on each other and how Micro level events relative to class relations can be reinforced by the context of macro level events.

== Neo-Weberian definition ==
According to sociologist Richard Breen, Weberian class analysis is limited. Weber largely focused on unequal opportunities in life, which he attributed to the initial distributions of resources within a capitalist market. Breen argues that Weber did little to address class conflict or even the development of collective action on a class level. Breen further writes, "For many reasons, there is not a deterministic relationship between the resources that individuals bring to the market and what they receive in return."

Breen cites sociologist Aage B. Sørensen's (1991) writings on class analysis, which described class positions as independent of who occupies such positions. From this, Breen describes that the purpose of class analysis is how and on what basis class positions are determined, rather than Weber's market-determined approach. Weberian class analysis also did not account for the influence of class beyond life chances, such as behaviours, actions, and preferences.

== Class differentials in educational attainment and their explanation ==
Sociologist John Goldthorpe explains that while educational attainment in developed countries has risen in the last decades due to endorsements of grants, loans and other social motivations, empirical data substantiates that the differentials in social-economic class still plays a major role in educational and economic attainment. He goes on to explain how people of lower social class tend to stay in the class of their upbringing by choosing to not pursue further educational attainment or the works needed to attain a better social status. Explanations for these phenomena include theories by Halsey and her associates, which state the connection between culture and class, how people of high social class or paramount culture set a more important objective on education compared to parents of lower classes. According to Goldthorpe, a more aggressive approach, as indicated by Bourdieu and Passeron, indicates that the educational system functions as a social control, in which dominant class enforce that schools run in a conservative manner and exploit the inequalities that come with every child due to their family's class background. This will ensure subjects of lower class status to accept failure or indulge in counter-school subcultures. Goldthorpe, however, states that in the last century there has truly been extensive opportunities for upward educational and class mobility defended by means of empirical data.

Other theories proposed by different sociologists arise as well. One view claimed by Keller and Zavalloni indicate that to better understand these trends, sociologists must study the aspirations of an individual on a relative level according to their social level and situation and not conclude absolute ideals of aspirations to all the classes, which would be easier to work with. Goldthorpe also acknowledges Boudon's two-effect view in educational attainment. Those stand as the primary effects, which exist as the creation of class differentials in initial achievement, and second effects that affect children when they transition in the educational system. They both work hand in hand were although initial achievement might pursue an individual as they develop in the educational system (Primary), choosing whether to transition into the next level in the system might still be influenced by their class origins (second). Goldthorpe goes on to encourage researchers to enforce further attention to the second effect, because as we progress, even today, the limitations of the primary effects seem to be vanishing as more educational attainment resources and opportunities are being funneled into all class levels.

== Class and political partnership ==
Goldthorpe describes how class influence on an individual's social situation is diminishing substantially in the world of politics. This evidently described by Sociologist M. Lipset during the latter half of the 20th century were liberal democratic working class advocated for their party to represent their problems In the 1950s but quickly diminished during the 1970s as class relations in political partnership was dissolving. This is particularly important, as some Marxist social groups state this to be the downfall of the working class and class analysis. Another example of this dissolution of political and class partnership is Britain's politics; in how political party conflicts tended to focus more on issues instead of interest of the class community. This in turn creates family-party separation which fuels different political party interest. Heath and his associates have theorized the dissolution of this partnership to be derivative of absolute and relative rates in class voting and social mobility. These theories develop through the class development of Britain during the latter half of the 20th centuries by implication of "trends in patterns of class mobility, in levels of class identification, and in class differences in political attitudes and values". Heath and his colleagues try to argue empirically against theories of Dunleavy and associates who stated that new structural cleavages were becoming the foundations for party support. On top of empirical support against, Goldthorpe explains that fluidity and boundaries are the major point against the theories of Dunleavy and his colleagues.

== Class interest ==
According to Erik Olin Wright, class interests "[...] are the material interests of people derived from their location-within-class-relations" (p. 21), which include living standards, working conditions, intensity of labor, leisure, material security, and more. These interests are specifically class interests because one's class location significantly influences the "opportunities and trade-offs" one can make. Class interests can also serve as a "theoretical bridge between the description of class relations and the actions of individuals within those relations" (p. 21).

== See also ==
- Class conflict
- Class consciousness
- Marxist analysis
