= The Democratic Paradox =

2000 essay collection by Chantal Mouffe

- Cover of the first edition
- Author: Chantal Mouffe
- Publisher: Verso Books
- Publication date: 2000
- Pages: 192
- ISBN: 978-1-85984-279-9
- OCLC: 464843335

The Democratic Paradox is a collection of essays by the Belgian political theorist Chantal Mouffe, published in 2000 by Verso Books. The essays offer further discussion of the concept of radical democracy that Mouffe explored in Hegemony and Socialist Strategy, co-authored by Ernesto Laclau. In this collection, Mouffe deals with the specific conflicts between the post-Marxist democratic theory that she and Laclau theorized in Hegemony and Socialist Strategy and the competing democratic theories proposed by Jürgen Habermas and John Rawls. Verso's UK blog characterizes The Democratic Paradox as Mouffe's most accessible review of her perspectives on radical democracy.

== Synopsis ==
The eponymous paradox of democracy that this collection of essays deals with is the internal conflict within modern liberal democracy that is created by the union of two separate strands of political thought: the tradition of classical liberalism and the tradition of democratic theory, forming the institution of liberal democracy.

We are dealing with a new political form of society whose specificity comes from the articulation between two different traditions. On one side we have the liberal tradition constituted by the rule of law, the defence of human rights and the respect of individual liberty; on the other the democratic tradition whose main ideas are those of equality, identity between governing and governed and popular sovereignty. There is no necessary relation between those two distinct traditions but only a contingent historical articulation....Let's not forget that, while we tend today to take the link between liberalism and democracy for granted, their union, far from being a smooth process, was the result of bitter struggles.

— Mouffe, The Democratic Paradox, pp. 2-3

Mouffe sees Radical Democracy as a means for continuing to sustain the balance between the values of liberalism and democracy. This balance is accomplished through the agonistic practice of valuing and sustaining dissent in the democratic process as a more important goal than consensus. This point is where Radical Democratic theory diverges from both Habermas and Rawls, as it contradicts Habermas's quest for rational consensus and Rawls's project for political liberalism. Mouffe describes the importance of the radical democratic alternative in a 2009 interview, saying that "The aim of a pluralist democracy is to provide the institutions that will allow them to take an agonistic form, in which opponents will treat each other not as enemies to be destroyed, but as adversaries who will fight for the victory of their position while recognising the right of their opponents to fight for theirs. An agonistic democracy requires the availability of a choice between real alternatives."
