= Political subjectivity =

Political subjectivity is a term used to indicate the deeply embedded nature of subjectivity and subjective experience in a socially constructed system of power and meaning. The notion of political subjectivity is an emerging idea in social sciences and humanities. In some sense the term political subjectivity reflects the converging point of a number of traditionally distinct disciplinary lines of investigation, such as philosophy, anthropology, political theory, and psychoanalytic theory. Above all, the current conceptualization of political subjectivity has become possible due to a fundamental shift in humanities and social sciences during the 20th century, commonly known as the linguistic turn.

Major figures associated with the question of political subjectivity come from diverse disciplinary backgrounds, such as German philosopher GWF Hegel, French psychoanalyst Jacques Lacan, French historian Michel Foucault, American literary critic Fredric Jameson, American cultural anthropologist Clifford Geertz, American medical anthropologist Byron J. Good, American philosopher and gender theorist Judith Butler, Canadian medical anthropologist Sadeq Rahimi, Argentine political theorist Ernesto Laclau, Slovenian philosopher Slavoj Zizek, Greek political theorist Yannis Stavrakakis, and many others.

The term "political subjectivity" had been used in earlier literature, such as Steven Brown's book, Political subjectivity: Applications of Q methodology in political science to refer to individual political view points as affected by social and personal psychological processes. But the term was later re-appropriated to refer to the much more intricate idea that the very experience of subjectivity is fundamentally political. According to Sadeq Rahimi in Meaning, Madness and Political Subjectivity, "Politicality is not an added aspect of the subject, but indeed the mode of being of the subject, that is, precisely what the subject is."

An early (1981) book by Fredric Jameson, The Political Unconscious: Narrative as a Socially Symbolic Act, can be considered one of the forerunners of the notion of political subjectivity. In his book Jameson attributed what he termed a "political unconscious" to text, asserting that all text has embedded in it, albeit in an implicit form, the encodings of the political history of the environment in which they have been produced. He then proposed “the doctrine of a political unconscious,” as an analytic method for unearthing the hermeneutically repressed political memories of text, and “restoring to the surface of the text the repressed and buried reality of this fundamental history” (p. 20). While Jameson's original theory of the political unconscious was primarily a neo-Marxist approach to literary criticism, later proliferation and interdisciplinary cross-fertilization of theories of subjectivity have greatly expanded Jameson's original ideas to include the range of political, cultural and psychological processes within the framework of political subjectivity.

== See also ==
- Subjectivity
- Intersubjectivity
- Phenomenology (philosophy)
- Phenomenology (psychology)
- Q methodology
- Subject (philosophy)
