= Radical democracy =

Type of democracy that advocates the radical extension of equality and liberty

Radical democracy is a type of democracy that advocates the radical extension of equality and liberty as core values, following the idea that democracy is an unfinished, inclusive, continuous and reflexive process. In the agonistic strand of radical democracy, this extension particularly emphasizes difference and plurality.

== Theories ==
Lincoln Dahlberg articulated three distinct strands of radical democracy, labeled as agonistic, deliberative and autonomist. In this topology, radical democracy serves as an umbrella category encompassing rival approaches, rather than a single doctrine: the deliberative strand corresponds to the Deliberative democracy that the agonistic strand explicitly opposes.

=== Agonistic perspective ===
The first and most noted strand of radical democracy is the agonistic perspective, which is associated with the work of Ernesto Laclau and Chantal Mouffe, who articulated Radical and pluralistic democracy in their book Hegemony and Socialist Strategy: Towards a Radical Democratic Politics, written in 1985. They argue that social movements which attempt to create social and political change need a strategy which challenges neoliberal and neoconservative concepts of democracy. This strategy is to expand the liberal definition of democracy, based on freedom and equality, to include difference.

According to Laclau and Mouffe Radical democracy means 'the root of democracy'. Laclau and Mouffe claim that liberal democracy and deliberative democracy, in their attempts to build consensus, oppress differing opinions, races, classes, genders, and worldviews. In the world, in a country, and in a social movement there are many (a plurality of) differences which resist consensus. Radical democracy is not only accepting of difference, dissent and antagonisms, but is dependent on it. Laclau and Mouffe argue based on the assumption that there are oppressive power relations that exist in society and that those oppressive relations should be made visible, re-negotiated and altered. By building democracy around difference and dissent, oppressive power relations existing in societies are able to come to the forefront so that they can be challenged.

=== Deliberative perspective ===
The second strand, deliberative, is mostly associated with the work of Jürgen Habermas. Although deliberative democracy is the very model that Laclau and Mouffe criticize in Hegemony and Socialist Strategy, Dahlberg included it as a strand of radical democracy in broader sense of theories that seek the ongoing radicalization of equality and liberty.

Habermas argues that political problems surrounding the organization of life can be resolved by deliberation. That is, people coming together and deliberating on the best possible solution. This type of radical democracy is in contrast with the agonistic perspective based on consensus and communicative means: there is a reflexive critical process of coming to the best solution. Equality and freedom are at the root of Habermas' deliberative theory. The deliberation is established through institutions that can ensure free and equal participation of all. Habermas is aware of the fact that different cultures, world-views and ethics can lead to difficulties in the deliberative process. Despite this fact he argues that the communicative reason can create a bridge between opposing views and interests.

=== Autonomist perspective ===
The third strand of radical democracy is the autonomist strand, which is associated with left-communist and post-Marxist ideas. The difference between this type of radical democracy and the two noted above is the focus on "the community". The community is seen as the pure constituted power instead of the deliberative rational individuals or the agonistic groups as in the first two strands. The community resembles a "plural multitude" (of people) instead of the working class in traditional Marxist theory. This plural multitude is the pure constituted power and reclaims this power by searching and creating mutual understandings within the community. This strand of radical democracy challenges the traditional thinking about equality and freedom in liberal democracies by stating that individual equality can be found in the singularities within the multitude, equality overall is created by an all-inclusive multitude and freedom is created by restoring the multitude in its pure constituted power. This strand of radical democracy is often a term used to refer to the post-Marxist perspectives of Italian radicalism – for example Paolo Virno.

== Theorists ==
=== Agonistic perspective ===
- William E. Connolly - Connolly is associated with his promotion of an agonistic democracy. An agonistic democracy is focused on contestation rather than on rational consensus. The discourse is not violence-based, but engages different aspects of political conflict. According to Connolly an agonistic democracy is based on a term he calls ¨agonistic respect¨, which allows people to honor different sources and conflicting opinions.
- Roslyn Fuller - Roslyn Fuller elaborates a conception of agonistic democracy that combines mass participation with active debate, pay for participation and modern information technology to create a citizen-centric direct democracy
- Ernesto Laclau - Associated with the agonistic strand of radical democracy as articulated in Hegemony and Socialist Strategy: Towards a Radical Democratic Politics.
- Chantal Mouffe - Associated with the agonistic strand of radical democracy as articulated in Hegemony and Socialist Strategy: Towards a Radical Democratic Politics.
- Roberto Mangabeira Unger - Roberto Mangabeira Unger argues that society does not emerge from consensus, compromising and looking for the best option, but from struggle and political contestation. Unger is a proponent of the vision of an empowered democracy, which would involve radical changes at politics in the centre. These changes would involve more social institutions in which everyone can interact, discuss and effectively empower themselves to drastically change economic, political and social circumstances.
- Sheldon S. Wolin - Wolin's political thought clearly aligns with the ideal of an participatory democracy. Wolin was the first in articulating the idea of a ¨fugitive democracy¨ in which democracy is a political experience and the ordinary people are the primary political actors. Wolin challenged consensus and can therefore be positioned within the agonistic perspective of radical democracy.

=== Deliberative perspective ===
- Jürgen Habermas - promotes deliberative democracy seeking active participation as described in the Theory of Communicative Action.
- James Fishkin - designed practical implementations of deliberative democracy with direct active participation.

=== Autonomist perspective ===
- Paolo Virno - Figurehead for the Italian autonomist Marxist movement.
- Ion Mittler - Mittler uses the term "multi-dimensional democracy" to describe a political system, which is based on regional legal autonomies of the major ideological movements in society, such as political parties. Theorists of autonomist radical democracy usually tend to suggest much smaller and more local autonomous communities than the quite large autonomies described by Mittler.

== Criticism ==
=== Agonistic perspective ===
Laclau and Mouffe have argued for radical agonistic democracy, where different opinions and worldviews are not oppressed by the search for consensus in liberal and deliberative democracy. As this agonistic perspective has been most influential in academic literature, it has been subject to most criticisms on the idea of radical democracy. Brockelman for example argues that the theory of radical democracy is a utopian ideal. Political theory, he argues, should not be used as offering a vision of a desirable society. In the same vein, it is argued that radical democracy might be useful at the local level, but does not offer a realistic perception of decision-making on the national level. For example, people might know what they want to see changing in their town and feel the urge to participate in the decision-making process of future local policy. Developing an opinion about issues at the local level often does not require specific skills or education. Deliberation in order to combat the problem of groupthink, in which the view of the majority dominates over the view of the minority, can be useful in this setting. However, people might not be skilled enough or willing to decide about national or international problems. A radical democracy approach for overcoming the flaws of democracy is, it is argued, not suitable for levels higher than the local one.

=== Deliberative perspective ===
Habermas and Rawls have argued for radical deliberative democracy, where consensus and communicative means are at the root of politics. However, some scholars identify multiple tensions between participation and deliberation. Three of these tensions are identified by Joshua Cohen, a student of the philosopher John Rawls:

1. Wanting to improve the quality of deliberation can be at the expense of public participation. In this case, representatives and legislators are more focused on argumentation and deliberation than on seeking to advance the interests of their constituents. By focusing on reasonable deliberation the interests of particular constituents can be underrepresented.
2. Conversely, seeking to maximize the public participation can be at the expense of the quality of deliberation. Maximize public participation can be accomplished by popular initiatives like referendums. Referendums however allows people to decide on an important topic with a yes/no vote. By using a yes/no vote people can be discouraged to engage in a reasoned discussion in creating legislation. It is also argued that through maximizing public participation, manipulation and suppression become present.
3. Deliberation depends on sufficient knowledge and interests from all participants as well as adequate and easy accessible information. On many important issues however, the number of participators with sufficient knowledge is rather limited and thus the quality of deliberation declines when more uninformed participants enter the discussion.

=== Radical democracy and colonialism ===
However, the concept of radical democracy is seen in some circles as colonial in nature due to its reliance on a western notion of democracy. It is argued that liberal democracy is viewed by the West as the only legitimate form of governance.

== Re-interpretations and adaptations ==
Since Laclau and Mouffe argued for a radical democracy, many other theorists and practitioners have adapted and changed the term. For example, bell hooks and Henry Giroux have all written about the application of radical democracy in education. In Hook's book Teaching to Transgress: Education as the practice of freedom she argues for education where educators teach students to go beyond the limits imposed against racial, sexual and class boundaries in order to "achieve the gift of freedom". Paulo Freire's work, although initiated decades before Laclau and Mouffe, can also be read through similar lenses. Theorists such as Paul Chatterton and Richard JF Day have written about the importance of radical democracy within some of the autonomous movements in Latin America (namely the EZLN—Zapatista Army of National Liberation in Mexico, the MST—Landless Workers' Movement in Brazil, and the Piquetero—Unemployed Workers Movement in Argentina) although the term radical democracy is used differently in these contexts.

== Radical democracy and the internet ==
With the rise of the internet in the years after the development of various strands of radical democracy theory, the relationship between the internet and the theory has been increasingly focused upon. The internet is regarded as an important aspect of radical democracy, as it provides a means for communication which is central to every approach to the theory.

The internet is believed to reinforce both the theory of radical democracy and the actual possibility of radical democracy through three distinct ways:

1. The internet provides a platform for further discussion about radical democracy, thus contributing to the theory's development;
2. The internet allows new political communities and democratic cultures to emerge that challenge the existing political ideas;
3. The internet strengthens the voice of minority groups.

This last point refers to the concept of a radical public sphere where voice in the political debate is given to otherwise oppressed or marginalized groups. Approached from the radical democracy theory, the expression of such views on the internet can be understood as online activism. In current liberal representative democracies, certain voices and interests are always favored above others. Through online activism, excluded opinions and views can still be articulated. In this way, activists contribute to the ideal of a heterogeneity of positions. However, the digital age does not necessarily contribute to the notion of radical democracy. Social media platforms possess the opportunity of shutting down certain, often radical, voices. This is counterproductive to radical democracy

== Contemporary mass movements committed to radical democracy ==
- The EZLN – Zapatista Army of National Liberation in Mexico: a far-left militant and political group. Their ideology is based on their aspiration to execute politics in a bottom-up, rather than top-down way. The EZLN is associated with the Zapatista uprising and the formation of the Rebel Zapatista Autonomous Municipalities, whose governance is heavily influenced by radical democratic and libertarian socialist principles.
- The MST – Landless Workers' Movement in Brazil: a social movement that aims at land reform to make land ownership more accessible for the poor. It seeks to achieve this goal through combating social issues such as racism, sexism and skewed income distributions.
- The AANES – Autonomous Administration of North and East Syria: an autonomous region in northeastern Syria established as a result of the Rojava Revolution with the support of the Syrian Democratic Forces based on principles of decentralization, direct democracy, and libertarian socialism.
- The Democratic Socialists of America tends to view "radical democracy" as inherent to anti-capitalist organizing.
- Casa Pueblo is a community organization in Puerto Rico focused on environmental protection. It is in favor of participatory democracy and community self-management, as well as decentralized national renewable energy infrastructure.

== See also ==
- Absolute democracy
