= Widder =

Widder or Widders may refer to:

== People ==
- David Widder
- Dean Widders
- Edith Widder
- Felix Widder (disambiguation), several people
- Frederick Widder
- Nathan Widder

== Other uses ==
- German auxiliary cruiser Widder, which translates to ram, i. e. Aries (constellation), resp. Aries (astrology)
- Widder (icebreaker), an icebreaker operated by the Wasser- und Schifffahrtsamt
