= Contingency, Hegemony, Universality =

2000 book by Judith Butler, Ernesto Laclau and Slavoj Žižek

Contingency, Hegemony, Universality: Contemporary Dialogues on the Left
- Authors: Judith Butler, Ernesto Laclau and Slavoj Žižek
- Language: English
- Publisher: Verso Books
- Publication date: 2000
- Media type: Print (paperback)
- Pages: 300
- ISBN: 1-85984-278-X
- OCLC: 44780799
- Dewey Decimal: 320/.01 21
- LC Class: JA71 .B88 2000

Contingency, Hegemony, Universality: Contemporary Dialogues on the Left is a collaborative book by the political theorists Judith Butler, Ernesto Laclau, and Slavoj Žižek published in 2000.

== Background, structure and themes ==
Over the course of the 1990s, Butler, Laclau, and Žižek found themselves engaging with each other's work in their own books. In order to focus more closely on their theoretical differences (and similarities), they decided to produce a book in which all three would contribute three essays each, with the authors' respective second and third essays responding to the points of dispute raised by the earlier essays. In this way, the book is structured in three "cycles" of three essays each, with points of dispute and lines of argumentation developed, passed back and forward, and so on.

At one point in the exchange, Butler refers to the exercise as an unintentional "comedy of formalisms," with each writer accusing the other two of being too abstract and formalist in relation to the declared themes of contingency, hegemony, and universality. At the heart of these themes is a desire to address the question of particularism and political emancipation. For example, while Žižek holds the notion of capitalism as a structure that enables various particular political claims, Butler and Laclau stress that all politics can be conceptualized in terms of a hegemonic struggle, which rejects the notion of any primary structure, such as capitalism or patriarchy.

In her review of the book Linda Zirelli writes that the three share the view that "emancipatory" praxis is only possible with a universal dimension, bringing people with a common interest together, but that such a universality cannot efface the conflicting particular concerns which motivate individuals. She ends her review by citing Laclau's claim that universality is better conceived as a project (a horizon) than as a grounds for action.

== Points of dispute between Butler and Laclau ==
- The Lacanian Real. In the psychoanalytic theory of Jacques Lacan, "the Real" is regarded as the limit of representation. Laclau draws upon this concept of the Real to justify his claim that political identities are incomplete. Butler says this approach elevates the Lacanian Real into a transcendental, ahistorical category. Laclau responds by saying that the Lacanian Real introduces a radical disjunction into our idea of history - something which puts the whole idea of a concept being "ahistorical" radically into question. In other words, for Lacan, there is no continuity to history and, therefore, there can be no stable "ahistorical" concepts.
- Political Struggles and Identity. Butler disputes Laclau's claim that competing political groups can form a "chain of equivalence" around a common lack (e.g. the incompleteness of their political identity), saying Laclau has no reason to assume that groups on the Left base their struggles on "identity". For this reason, Butler argues for a politics of translation between political groups struggling for liberation, in which groups reformulate their demands in the act of translating these demands into ones which can be placed coherently alongside the demands of other groups.
- Citation and Parodic Performance. Butler claims that gender codes such as fashion and physical movements can be self-consciously parodied in such a way as to weaken those codes - a project they believe important to feminist liberation. Laclau says that Butler's use of the word "parody" in this context is overly-playful and restricts feminist politics to less confrontational modes of political resistance.

== Points of dispute between Laclau and Žižek ==
- Is Capitalism The "Only Game In Town"? Žižek's main argument against Laclau is that capitalism can accommodate all the demands of identity politics, and still continue to economically exploit those who identify with the newly liberated group. For instance, feminists might rejoice at equal pay, yet - from Žižek's point of view - this only serves to encourage women's participation in capitalist economics. Žižek accuses Laclau of accepting the idea that "capitalism is now the only game in town" (95).
- Is Universality Fleeting Or Impossible? Laclau claims that true political universality is impossible. However, for Laclau, this does not mean that we should abandon any attempt at political universality (as some poststructuralists might urge). Instead, Laclau argues that Leftists have to include this certain failure to achieve universality in their strategies - hence the title of his most successful book (co-written with Chantal Mouffe) Hegemony and Socialist Strategy (1985). However, Žižek claims that universality is possible, although it is fleeting. Žižek believes that once the Left accept the impossibility of universality (as Laclau does), they will have given up all hope of ever over-throwing capitalism. In that sense, Žižek's stand on universality is equally as strategic as Laclau's.

== Points of dispute between Butler and Žižek ==
- Who Is The True Formalist? Butler accuses Žižek of being a Hegelian formalist on the basis that he appears to simply apply his Hegelian metaphysics to culture, whereas Butler themself is interested in the idea of performativity as a cultural ritual. Thus, Butler thinks that Žižek is uninterested in the specificity of the examples he uses to illustrate his points and that he really only chooses examples which will illustrate and serve his own argument. In turn, Žižek accuses Butler of being a Kantian formalist because, in his view, gender performativity is an empty formalist structure which is filled out by contingent cultural practices.
- Lacanian Sexual Difference. Following the psychoanalytic theory of Lacan, Žižek claims that sexual difference functions as an "empty" difference onto which all other subsequent differences are projected. Thus, during infancy, a child only enters the semiotic world of language once it has accepted the existence of sexual difference (which remains an "empty" difference because the pre-lingual infant cannot fill it out with any positive content). Against this view (and in defence of their thesis that gender is performatively enacted), Butler argues that, in order to be approached this way, the concept of sexual difference in Lacanian theory must be "emptied out" of positive content, such as the biological difference between males and females.
