= Aletta Norval =

South African political theorist

Aletta Norval (born 1960) is a South African born political theorist. As of 2019 she is Deputy Vice-Chancellor (Education) at Anglia Ruskin University.

A prominent member of the Essex School of discourse analysis, she is mainly known for her deconstructionist analysis of Apartheid discourse, for her methodological contributions to discourse analysis and for her work on decentred, democratic and poststructuralist political theory. Her other research interests include feminist theory, South-African politics, ethnicity and the politics of race. More recently, she has worked on biometrics, focussing on issues of citizen consent to identity management techniques.

Norval studied political science at the University of Johannesburg (South Africa) and discourse analysis at Essex University. She received a master's degree from the University of Johannesburg, and a MA and PhD from the Ideology and Discourse Analysis programme at the University of Essex. Her doctoral thesis, completed under the supervision of Ernesto Laclau, was entitled ‘Accounting for Apartheid: Its Emergence, Logic and Crisis’.

Following the completion of her doctoral studies, Norval started an academic career at the Department of Government at Essex University, where she is currently a Professor. She was Director of the PhD Programme in Ideology and Discourse Analysis and co-director of the Centre for Theoretical Studies in the Humanities and the Social Sciences, both founded by Ernesto Laclau. She was Dean of Postgraduate Research and Education (2012-2013) and was Pro-Vice-Chancellor Education at the University of Essex from 2013 to 2018. She was also a member of the Privacy Expert Group (PEG) of the Biometrics Institute, until 2019.

Norval has authored and co-edited many books and has published numerous articles in journals such as: 'American Political Science Review', 'Ethics & Global Politics', Journal of Political Ideologies; Political Theory; Diacritics; Philosophy and Social Criticism; Constellations; Political Studies; Acta Philosophica; Critical Discourse Studies; British Journal of Political Science.

== Selected bibliography ==
=== Books ===
- 'Practices of Freedom: Decentered Governance, Conflict and Democratic Participation', (Cambridge University Press, 2014) (co-edited with Steven Griggs and Hendrik Wagenaar)
- Aversive Democracy: Inheritance and Originality in the Democratic Tradition (Cambridge: Cambridge University Press, 2007)
- 'n Teoretiese Studie van die Metodologie van Kruiskulturele Houdingsmeting (A Theoretical Inquiry into the Methodology of Cross-Cultural Attitude Research) (Pretoria: Human Sciences Research Council, 1984; second edition 1993)
- (co-edited with David Howarth and Yannis Stavrakakis) Discourse Theory and Political Analysis (Manchester: Manchester University Press, 2000)
- (co-edited with David Howarth) South Africa in Transition: New Theoretical Perspectives (Basingstoke: Macmillan, 1998)

=== Papers ===
- Norval, Aletta; Glynos, Jason; Howarth, David; Speed, Ewen (August 2009). Discourse analysis: varieties and methods (NCRM/014). Southampton, UK: NCRM: National Centre for Research Methods funded by: ESRC - Economic & Social Research Council. Pdf version.
