= Myochrous denticollis =

Scientific classification
- Kingdom: Animalia
- Phylum: Arthropoda
- Clade: Pancrustacea
- Class: Insecta
- Order: Coleoptera
- Suborder: Polyphaga
- Infraorder: Cucujiformia
- Family: Chrysomelidae
- Genus: Myochrous
- Species: M. denticollis

Binomial name
- Myochrous denticollis (Say, 1824)

Synonyms
- Colaspis denticollis Say, 1824

Species of beetle

Myochrous denticollis, the southern corn leaf beetle, is a species of leaf beetle. It is found in Central America and North America. It is a crop pest, and has been reported to damage corn in Illinois.

Adults are about 3/16 inch long and about a third as wide. They are colored dark brown and often covered with bits of soil. The thorax has three "teeth" on each lateral edge, after which the species is named (denticollis is Latin for "toothed-collar"). The beetles drop from their food plants to the ground and hide when they are disturbed, making them difficult to find.

Southern corn leaf beetles overwinter as adults beneath the soil and plant debris and in clumps of some species of weeds. The adults emerge again in early spring, to feed on young weed hosts such as cocklebur, smartweed, and crabgrass as well as early-planted corn.

== Gallery ==
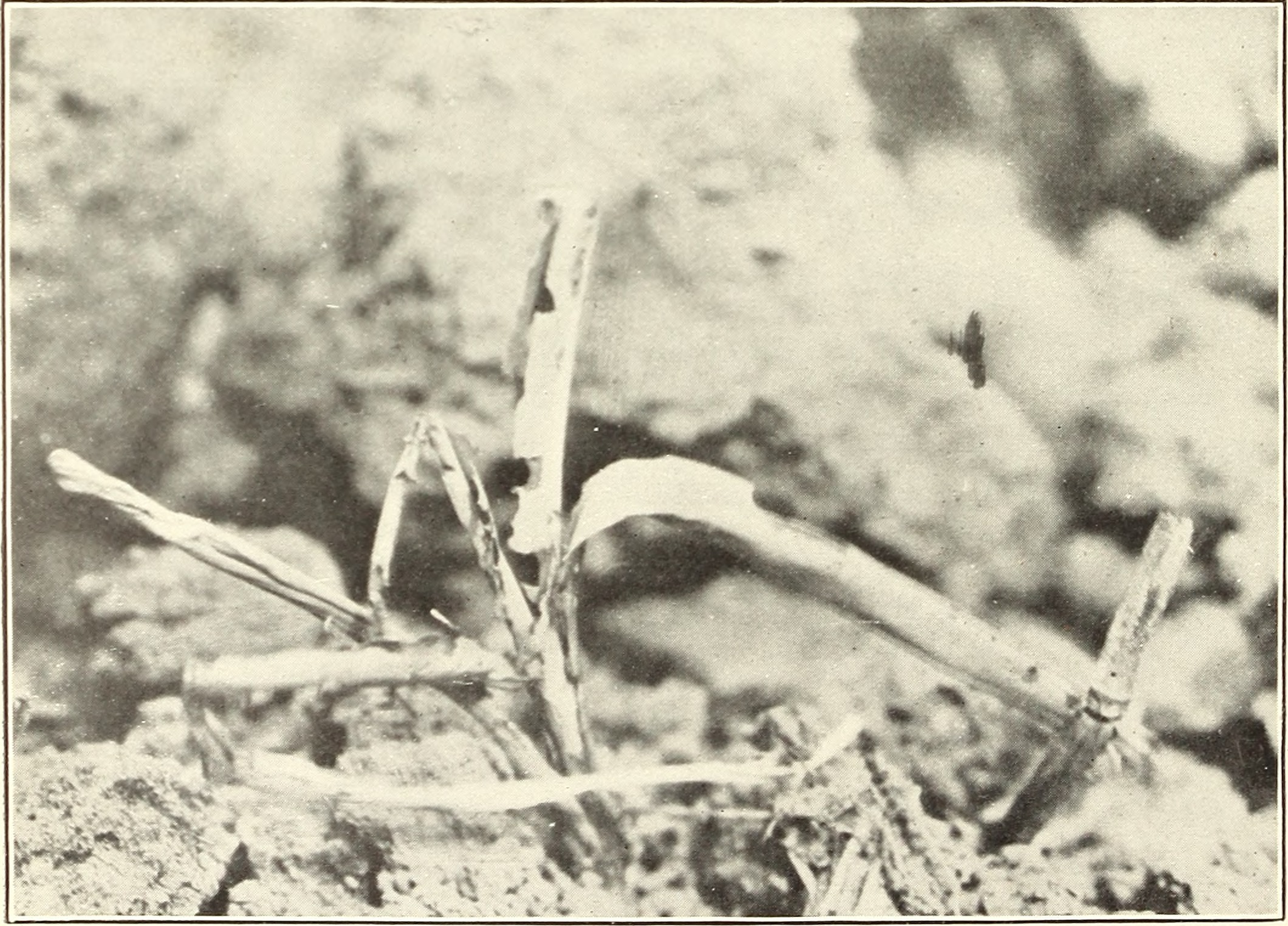
A corn plant completely destroyed by the southern corn leaf beetle (1915)
