= Xanthium argenteum =

Scientific classification
- Kingdom: Plantae
- Clade: Embryophytes
- Clade: Tracheophytes
- Clade: Angiosperms
- Clade: Eudicots
- Clade: Asterids
- Order: Asterales
- Family: Asteraceae
- Tribe: Heliantheae
- Genus: Xanthium
- Species: X. argenteum

Binomial name
- Xanthium argenteum Widder

Species of flowering plant

Xanthium argenteum is a flowering plant native to central Chile.
