= Essex School of discourse analysis =

Body of thought influenced by Laclau and Mouffe

The Essex School of discourse analysis, or simply 'The Essex School', refers to a type of scholarship founded on the works of Ernesto Laclau and Chantal Mouffe. It focuses predominantly on the political discourses of late modernity utilising discourse analysis, as well as post-structuralist and psychoanalytic theory, such as may be found in the works of Lacan, Foucault, Barthes, and Derrida. Discourse analysis, according to its own terms at least, seeks to "unfix and destabilise" the accepted meanings of everyday language, and to reveal how the dominant discourse "marginalises and oppresses... equally valid claims to the question of how power could and should be exercised."

== History ==
Founding figures of this approach are Ernesto Laclau and Chantal Mouffe, two post-Marxist political theorists, who, tried, since the 1970s, to reinterpret Gramsci’s theory of hegemony to highlight the role of meaning and of processes of interpellation and identification in the creation of political identities and in the articulation and sedimentation of political discourses and hegemonic orders. The paradigmatic formulation of this approach and of its various conceptual innovations can be found in Laclau’s and Mouffe’s Hegemony and Socialist Strategy, first published in 1985, as well as in subsequent works.

=== School founded ===
The approach developed by Laclau and Mouffe provided the teaching backbone of the graduate programme in Ideology and Discourse Analysis Laclau founded at the University of Essex in the early 1980s. Already from its inception, the programme attracted many MA and PhD students from around the globe, especially from Argentina, Mexico, Greece, Denmark, Spain, the US and the UK. Many PhD theses further developing Laclau’s and Mouffe’s discourse theory and applying it in the analysis of empirical cases have since been completed. The activities of the Centre for Theoretical Studies in the Humanities and the Social Sciences, also founded by Laclau at the University of Essex (and now co-directed by Norval and Howarth), also served as a hub for the group.

=== Spread and naming ===
Graduates of the programme are now employed by universities in many parts of the world, while the programme itself is run by three members of staff at Essex: Aletta Norval, David Howarth and Jason Glynos, all ex-PhD students of Laclau. Academics associated with the programme have also set up a World Network in Ideology and Discourse Analysis, which provides a web-based channel of communication between its 203 registered members and has organized the Inaugural World Conference in Ideology and Discourse Analysis, which took place from 8–10 September 2008 at Roskilde University, Denmark, with Ernesto Laclau as keynote speaker. Beginning in 2000, a series of monographs, edited collections, and textbooks by members of the group, some of them based on the doctoral research conducted within the programme were published, synthesizing the group's work. As the group has attained more recognition within the academic community, it has begun to be included within the field of discourse analysis in textbooks and introductions to the field published by independent scholars. As a result of all these developments, the distinct identity of the group and of its research output gradually triggered a process of naming. From 2003 onwards, when critics wanted to refer to the work of members of the group, they used the phrase ‘the Essex School’, which is now widely used.

== Approach ==
The theoretical traditions influencing Mouffe and Laclau are primarily Saussurean linguistics, Lacanian psychoanalysis, and deconstruction. The Essex School does not limit the research direction of its members, each one of whom develops their own approach independently; it offers, however, a loose framework within which a multitude of theoretical and political interventions can flourish, enriching the original vision of Laclau and Mouffe.

== Members ==
- Ernesto Laclau
- Chantal Mouffe
- Aletta Norval
- David Howarth
- Jason Glynos
- Yannis Stavrakakis
- Oliver Marchart
- Jacob Torfing
- Torben Bech Dyrberg
- Sebastian Barros
- Alejandro Groppo
- Martin Nonhoff

== Bibliography ==
- Glynos, Jason & Howarth, David (2007) Logics of Critical Explanation in Social and Political Theory. London: Routledge.
- Howarth, David (2000) Discourse. Buckingham: Open University Press.
- Howarth, David, Norval, Aletta & Stavrakakis, Yannis, eds. (2000) Discourse Theory and Political Analysis: identities, hegemonies and social change. Manchester - New York: Manchester University Press – St Martin's Press.
- Howarth, David & Torfing, Jacob, eds. (2005) Discourse Theory in European Politics. Houndmills: Palgrave.
- David, Katiambo (2019). International Trade as Discourse: Construction of a 'China Threat' Through Fakes. Critical Arts: South-North Cultural and Media Studies.
- Laclau, Ernesto & Mouffe, Chantal (1985) Hegemony and Socialist Strategy. London: Verso.
- Laclau, Ernesto (1990) New Reflections on the Revolution of Our Time. London: Verso.
- Laclau, Ernesto, ed. (1994) The Making of the Political Identities. London: Verso.
- Laclau, Ernesto (1996) Emancipation(s). London: Verso.
- Laclau, Ernesto (2005) The Populist Reason. London: Verso.
- Mouffe, Chantal (1993) The Return of the Political. London: Verso.
- Mouffe, Chantal, ed. (1996) Deconstruction and Pragmatism. New York: Routledge.
- Mouffe, Chantal (2000) The Democratic Paradox. London: Verso.
- Mouffe, Chantal (2006) On the Political. London: Routledge.
- Phillips, Louise & Jorgensen, Marianne (2002) Discourse Analysis as Theory and Method. London: Sage.
- Smith, A. M. (1998) Laclau and Mouffe: The Radical Democratic Imaginary. London: Routledge.
- Stavrakakis, Yannis (1999) Lacan and the Political. London and New York: Routledge.
- Stavrakakis, Yannis (2007) The Lacanian Left. Albany: SUNY Press.
- Torfing, Jacob (1999) New Theories of Discourse. Oxford: Blackwell.
