= On the Political =

2005 book by Chantal Mouffe

- Author: Chantal Mouffe
- Language: English
- Publisher: Routledge
- Publication date: 15 April 2005
- Publication place: United Kingdom
- Pages: 144
- ISBN: 9780415305211

On the Political is a 2005 book by the Belgian writer Chantal Mouffe. The book argues against political consensus as a goal in itself and promotes agonism.

== Summary ==
The book is an analysis of international politics in the wake of the September 11 attacks, where Mouffe traces historical roots of liberalism and globalisation. Mouffe argues against the ambition to create political consensus, instead presenting a combative attitude as the heart of democracy. Mouffe's conclusion is that "[i]t is not in our power to eliminate conflicts and escape our human condition, but it is in our power to create the practices, discourses and institutions that would allow those conflicts to take an agonistic form".
