= For a Left Populism =

2018 pamphlet by Chantal Mouffe

- Author: Chantal Mouffe
- Language: English
- Subject: Left-wing populism
- Publisher: Verso Books
- Publication date: July 2018
- Publication place: United Kingdom
- Pages: 112
- ISBN: 978-1-78663-757-4

For a Left Populism is a 2018 pamphlet by the Belgian writer Chantal Mouffe.

== Synopsis ==
Influenced by Carl Schmitt's friend-enemy distinction, the Belgian political theorist Chantal Mouffe promotes the development of left-wing populism as a method to establish hegemony for progressivist views. Mouffe argues that the current political situation is a "populist moment" and the left can use this to define a "people", which can be done on other grounds than nation or race, and mobilise it against adversaries chosen by the left.

== Reception ==
William Davies wrote in The Guardian that there are some recent examples of what Mouffe seems to favour, such as Syriza, Jeremy Corbyn and Bernie Sanders, but that it remains unclear how the left can reach its goals through populism, and how a left-wing populism can remain distinct from right-wing populism and avoid adopting "certain aspects of fascism (such as antisemitism)". Publishers Weekly called the book "a noble effort that grows increasingly muddled" and wrote that it is "difficult to tell who this book was written for, since large swaths of the left (in Western Europe and elsewhere) either already practice what Mouffe proposes or participate in the more radical formations that she critiques".
