= Myochrous =

Scientific classification
- Kingdom: Animalia
- Phylum: Arthropoda
- Clade: Pancrustacea
- Class: Insecta
- Order: Coleoptera
- Suborder: Polyphaga
- Infraorder: Cucujiformia
- Family: Chrysomelidae
- Subfamily: Eumolpinae
- Tribe: Eumolpini
- Genus: Myochrous; Erichson, 1847

Type species
- Myochrous immundus Erichson, 1847

Synonyms
- Myochrous Chevrolat in Dejean, 1836 (nomen nudum)

Genus of leaf beetles

Myochrous is a genus of leaf beetles in the subfamily Eumolpinae. It is known from North, Central and South America. There are over 50 described species in Myochrous. The generic name is a combination of the Ancient Greek words μῦς (mouse) and χρῶμα (color).

The southern corn leaf beetle (Myochrous denticollis) is a crop pest, and has been reported to damage corn in Illinois. Additionally, the species Myochrous melancholicus has been reported to damage banana fruit.

According to BugGuide and ITIS, the genus is now placed in the tribe Eumolpini instead of Adoxini.

== Species ==
- Myochrous adisi Medvedev, 2004 – Brazil
- Myochrous armatus Baly, 1865 (cane leaf or bud beetle) – Brazil, Uruguay, Argentina, Chile
- Myochrous austrinus Blake, 1950 – United States (Arizona), Mexico
- Myochrous barbadensis Blake, 1947
  - Myochrous barbadensis barbadensis Blake, 1947 – Barbados, Grenada, Trinidad, Guyana, Suriname
  - Myochrous barbadensis coenus Blake, 1950 – Panama, Colombia, Venezuela
- Myochrous blakeae Shute, 1974 – Nicaragua
- Myochrous bolivianus Blake, 1950 – Bolivia
- Myochrous brunneus Blake, 1950 – Brazil
- Myochrous bryanti Blake, 1950 – Trinidad
- Myochrous calcariferus Blake, 1950 – Bolivia
- Myochrous carinatus Jacoby, 1891 – Belize
- Myochrous chacoensis Blake, 1950 – Argentina
- Myochrous crassimarginatus Blake, 1950 – French Guiana
- Myochrous cubensis Blake, 1947 – Cuba
- Myochrous curculionoides Lefèvre, 1897 – Brazil
- Myochrous cyphus Blake, 1950 – United States (Texas, New Mexico), Mexico
- Myochrous darlingtoni Blake, 1950 – Colombia
- Myochrous denticollis (Say, 1824) (southern corn leaf beetle) – eastern Canada and US, Mexico
- Myochrous elachius Blake, 1950 – Panama, Colombia
- Myochrous explanatus Baly, 1865 – Venezuela, Colombia, Bolivia
- Myochrous femoralis Jacoby, 1882 – Belize
- Myochrous figueroae Brèthes, 1923 – Argentina
- Myochrous floridanus Schaeffer, 1933
  - Myochrous floridanus floridanus Schaeffer, 1933 – United States (Virginia to Florida to Louisiana)
  - Myochrous floridanus texanus Blake, 1950 – United States (Texas)
- Myochrous geminus Blake, 1950 – Ecuador, Peru
- Myochrous hispaniolae Blake, 1947 – Haiti, Dominican Republic
- Myochrous immundus Erichson, 1847 – Peru, Chile
- Myochrous intermedius Blake, 1950 – United States (Iowa to Texas)
- Myochrous jamaicensis Blake, 1947 – Jamaica
- Myochrous latisetiger Blake, 1950 – Colombia, Venezuela
- Myochrous leucurus Blake, 1950 – French Guiana
- Myochrous longipes Blake, 1950 – Colombia, Peru, Venezuela, Brazil, Bolivia
- Myochrous longulus LeConte, 1858 – western US, Mexico
- Myochrous magnus Schaeffer, 1904 – United States (Texas), Mexico
- Myochrous mamorensis Blake, 1950 – Bolivia
- Myochrous melancholicus Jacoby, 1882 – Mexico
- Myochrous monrosi Blake, 1950 – Argentina
- Myochrous movallus Johnson, 1931 – United States (South Dakota to Texas)
- Myochrous nanus Blake, 1950 – Bolivia, Paraguay
- Myochrous normalis Blake, 1950 – Paraguay
- Myochrous paulus Blake, 1950 – Guyana, French Guiana, Suriname, Venezuela
- Myochrous pauxillus Schaeffer, 1933 – United States (Texas)
- Myochrous platylonchus Blake, 1950 – Panama, Colombia, Venezuela
- Myochrous portoricensis Blake, 1947 – Puerto Rico
- Myochrous ranella Blake, 1950 – United States (Virginia to Florida to Louisiana)
- Myochrous rhabdotus Blake, 1950 – Trinidad, Guyana
- Myochrous sallei Baly, 1865 – Mexico
- Myochrous sapucayensis Blake, 1950 – Paraguay
- Myochrous severini Blake, 1950 – United States (North Dakota, South Dakota)
- Myochrous spinipes Blake, 1950 – Venezuela
- Myochrous squamosus LeConte, 1859 – western North America
- Myochrous stenomorphus Blake, 1950 – Argentina
- Myochrous tibialis Jacoby, 1882 – Mexico, Belize, Guatemala
- Myochrous whitei Blake, 1950 – United States (California)

Species doubtfully included in the genus:

- Myochrous dubius (Fabricius, 1801) – "America meridionali", possibly from Saint Croix?
