= Subjectivity and objectivity (philosophy) =

Basic distinction in philosophy

The distinction between subjectivity and objectivity is a basic idea of philosophy, particularly epistemology and metaphysics. Various understandings of this distinction have evolved through the work of philosophers over centuries. One typical distinction is:

- Something is subjective if it is based primarily in people's mental experiences (such as perceptions, emotions, opinions, imaginings), with its unique first-person nature. If a claim is true exclusively when considering the claim from the viewpoint of sentient beings, it is subjectively true. For example, one person may consider the weather to be pleasantly warm, and another person may consider the same weather to be too hot; both views are subjective.
- Something is objective if it can be confirmed through valid logic or evidence beyond mere mental constructs or personal viewpoints, such as through self-evidence, formal proofs, established facts, and scientific experiments, plus, arguably, certain axioms, consistent observations from multiple credible people, some types of intersubjective dialogue, etc. Objective information is usually considered unbiased by emotions, opinions, or beliefs. For example, a mathematical equation, such as "2 + 2 = 4", is often considered an objective truth. Another example is that the discovery of penicillin began with an initial subjective observation of its antibacterial effects. This observation was subsequently investigated through rigorous experimentation, leading to objective evidence that established penicillin as an effective antibacterial agent, capable of successfully treating various illnesses.

The two terms are usually regarded as opposites. However, sources differ about specific definitions, which remain somewhat ambiguous. The distinction is often treated as a given, not the specific focal point of a discourse, necessitating modern explorations into the complications regarding the binary: e.g., the view of particular thinkers that objectivity is an illusion and does not exist at all, or that a spectrum joins subjectivity and objectivity with a gray area in-between, or that the problem of other minds is best viewed through the concept of intersubjectivity.

The distinction between subjectivity and objectivity is often related to discussions of consciousness, agency, personhood, philosophy of mind, philosophy of language, reality, truth, and communication (for example in narrative communication and journalism).

== Etymology ==
The root of the words subjectivity and objectivity are subject and object, philosophical terms that mean, respectively, an observer and a thing being observed. The word subjectivity comes from subject in a philosophical sense, meaning an individual who possesses unique conscious experiences, such as perspectives, feelings, beliefs, and desires, or who (consciously) acts upon or wields power over some other entity (an object).

== In different fields ==
=== In Ancient philosophy ===
Aristotle's teacher Plato considered geometry to be a condition of his idealist philosophy concerned with universal truth. In Plato's Republic, Socrates opposes the sophist Thrasymachus's relativistic account of justice, and argues that justice is mathematical in its conceptual structure, and that ethics was therefore a precise and objective enterprise with impartial standards for truth and correctness, like geometry. The rigorous mathematical treatment Plato gave to moral concepts set the tone for the western tradition of moral objectivism that came after him. His contrasting between objectivity and opinion became the basis for philosophies intent on resolving the questions of reality, truth, and existence. He saw opinions as belonging to the shifting sphere of sensibilities, as opposed to a fixed, eternal and knowable incorporeality. Where Plato distinguished between how we know things and their ontological status, subjectivism such as George Berkeley's depends on perception. In Platonic terms, a criticism of subjectivism is that it is difficult to distinguish between knowledge, opinions, and subjective knowledge.

Platonic idealism is a form of metaphysical objectivism, holding that the ideas exist independently from the individual. Berkeley's empirical idealism, on the other hand, holds that things only exist as they are perceived. Both approaches boast an attempt at objectivity. Plato's definition of objectivity can be found in his epistemology, which is based on mathematics, and his metaphysics, where knowledge of the ontological status of objects and ideas is resistant to change.

=== In Western philosophy ===
In Western philosophy, the idea of subjectivity is thought to have its roots in the works of the European Enlightenment thinkers Descartes and Kant though it could also stem as far back as the Ancient Greek philosopher Aristotle's work relating to the soul. The idea of subjectivity is often seen as a peripheral to other philosophical concepts, namely skepticism, individuals and individuality, and existentialism. The questions surrounding subjectivity have to do with whether or not people can escape the subjectivity of their own human existence and whether or not there is an obligation to try to do so.

Important thinkers who focused on this area of study include Descartes, Locke, Kant, Hegel, Kierkegaard, Husserl, Foucault, Derrida, Nagel, and Sartre.

Subjectivity was rejected by Foucault and Derrida in favor of constructionism, but Sartre embraced and continued Descartes' work in the subject by emphasizing subjectivity in phenomenology. Sartre believed that, even within the material force of human society, the ego was an essentially transcendent being—posited, for instance, in his opus Being and Nothingness through his arguments about the 'being-for-others' and the 'for-itself' (i.e., an objective and subjective human being).

The innermost core of subjectivity resides in a unique act of what Fichte called "self-positing", where each subject is a point of absolute autonomy, which means that it cannot be reduced to a moment in the network of causes and effects.

==== Religion ====
One way that subjectivity has been conceptualized by philosophers such as Kierkegaard is in the context of religion. Religious beliefs can vary quite extremely from person to person, but people often think that whatever they believe is the truth. Subjectivity as seen by Descartes and Sartre was a matter of what was dependent on consciousness, so, because religious beliefs require the presence of a consciousness that can believe, they must be subjective. This is in contrast to what has been proven by pure logic or hard sciences, which does not depend on the perception of people, and is therefore considered objective. Subjectivity is what relies on personal perception regardless of what is proven or objective.

Many philosophical arguments within this area of study have to do with moving from subjective thoughts to objective thoughts with many different methods employed to get from one to the other along with a variety of conclusions reached. This is exemplified by Descartes deductions that move from reliance on subjectivity to somewhat of a reliance on God for objectivity. Foucault and Derrida denied the idea of subjectivity in favor of their ideas of constructs in order to account for differences in human thought. Instead of focusing on the idea of consciousness and self-consciousness shaping the way humans perceive the world, these thinkers would argue that it is instead the world that shapes humans, so they would see religion less as a belief and more as a cultural construction.

==== Phenomenology ====
Others like Husserl and Sartre followed the phenomenological approach. This approach focused on the distinct separation of the human mind and the physical world, where the mind is subjective because it can take liberties like imagination and self-awareness where religion might be examined regardless of any kind of subjectivity. The philosophical conversation around subjectivity remains one that struggles with the epistemological question of what is real, what is made up, and what it would mean to be separated completely from subjectivity.

=== In epistemology ===
In opposition to philosopher René Descartes' method which is along the lines of the statement, "Cogito, ergo sum", natural philosopher Isaac Newton applied the relatively objective scientific method to look for evidence before forming a hypothesis. Partially in response to Kant's rationalism, logician Gottlob Frege applied objectivity to his epistemological and metaphysical philosophies. If reality exists independently of consciousness, then it would logically include a plurality of indescribable forms. Objectivity requires a definition of truth formed by propositions with truth value. An attempt of forming an objective construct incorporates ontological commitments to the reality of objects.

The importance of perception in evaluating and understanding objective reality is debated in the observer effect of quantum mechanics. Direct or naïve realists rely on perception as key in observing objective reality, while instrumentalists hold that observations are useful in predicting objective reality. The concepts that encompass these ideas are important in the philosophy of science. Philosophies of mind explore whether objectivity relies on perceptual constancy.

=== In historiography ===
History as a discipline has wrestled with notions of objectivity from its very beginning. While its object of study is commonly thought to be the past, the only thing historians have to work with are different versions of stories based on individual perceptions of reality and memory.

Several history streams developed to devise ways to solve this dilemma: Historians like Leopold von Ranke (19th century) have advocated for the use of extensive evidence –especially archived physical paper documents– to recover the bygone past, claiming that, as opposed to people's memories, objects remain stable in what they say about the era they witnessed, and therefore represent a better insight into objective reality. In the 20th century, the Annales School emphasized the importance of shifting focus away from the perspectives of influential men –usually politicians around whose actions narratives of the past were shaped–, and putting it on the voices of ordinary people. Postcolonial streams of history challenge the colonial-postcolonial dichotomy and critique Eurocentric academia practices, such as the demand for historians from colonized regions to anchor their local narratives to events happening in the territories of their colonizers to earn credibility. All the streams explained above try to uncover whose voice is more or less truth-bearing and how historians can stitch together versions of it to best explain what "actually happened."

==== Trouillot ====
The anthropologist Michel-Rolph Trouillot developed the concepts of historicity 1 and 2 to explain the difference between the materiality of socio-historical processes (H1) and the narratives that are told about the materiality of socio-historical processes (H2). This distinction hints that H1 would be understood as the factual reality that elapses and is captured with the concept of "objective truth", and that H2 is the collection of subjectivities that humanity has stitched together to grasp the past. Debates about positivism, relativism, and postmodernism are relevant to evaluating these concepts' importance and the distinction between them.

In his book "Silencing the past", Trouillot wrote about the power dynamics at play in history-making, outlining four possible moments in which historical silences can be created: (1) making of sources (who gets to know how to write, or to have possessions that are later examined as historical evidence), (2) making of archives (what documents are deemed important to save and which are not, how to classify materials, and how to order them within physical or digital archives), (3) making of narratives (which accounts of history are consulted, which voices are given credibility), and (4) the making of history (the retrospective construction of what The Past is).

Because history (official, public, familial, personal) informs current perceptions and how we make sense of the present, whose voice gets to be included in it –and how– has direct consequences in material socio-historical processes. Thinking of current historical narratives as impartial depictions of the totality of events unfolded in the past by labeling them as "objective" risks sealing historical understanding. Acknowledging that history is never objective and always incomplete has a meaningful opportunity to support social justice efforts. Under said notion, voices that have been silenced are placed on an equal footing to the grand and popular narratives of the world, appreciated for their unique insight of reality through their subjective lens.

=== In social sciences ===
Being "Objective" has several meaning, it can refer to value neutrality (impartiality) or to truth (as opposed to subjective opinions).

Subjectivity is an inherently social mode that comes about through innumerable interactions within society. As much as subjectivity is a process of individuation, it is equally a process of socialization, the individual never being isolated in a self-contained environment, but endlessly engaging in interaction with the surrounding world. Culture is a living totality of the subjectivity of any given society constantly undergoing transformation. Subjectivity is both shaped by it and shapes it in turn, but also by other things like the economy, political institutions, communities, as well as the natural world.

Though the boundaries of societies and their cultures are indefinable and arbitrary, the subjectivity inherent in each one is palatable and can be recognized as distinct from others. Subjectivity is in part a particular experience or organization of reality, which includes how one views and interacts with humanity, objects, consciousness, and nature, so the difference between different cultures brings about an alternate experience of existence that forms life in a different manner. A common effect on an individual of this disjunction between subjectivities is culture shock, where the subjectivity of the other culture is considered alien and possibly incomprehensible or even hostile.

Political subjectivity is an emerging concept in social sciences and humanities. Political subjectivity is a reference to the deep embeddedness of subjectivity in the socially intertwined systems of power and meaning. "Politicality", writes Sadeq Rahimi in Meaning, Madness and Political Subjectivity, "is not an added aspect of the subject, but indeed the mode of being of the subject, that is, precisely what the subject is."

Scientific objectivity is practicing science while intentionally reducing partiality, biases, or external influences. Moral objectivity is the concept of moral or ethical codes being compared to one another through a set of universal facts or a universal perspective and not through differing conflicting perspectives.

Journalistic objectivity is the reporting of facts and news with minimal personal bias or in an impartial or politically neutral manner.

== See also ==
- Academic bias
- Dogma
- Factual relativism
- German idealism
- Intersubjectivity
- Journalistic objectivity
- Naïve realism
- Objectivity (science)
- Objectivism
- Omniscience
- Phenomenology (philosophy)
- Phenomenology (psychology)
- Political subjectivity
- Q methodology
- Relativism
- Subject (philosophy)
- Transcendental subjectivity
- Subjectivity in Kierkegaard
- Self
- Vertiginous question
