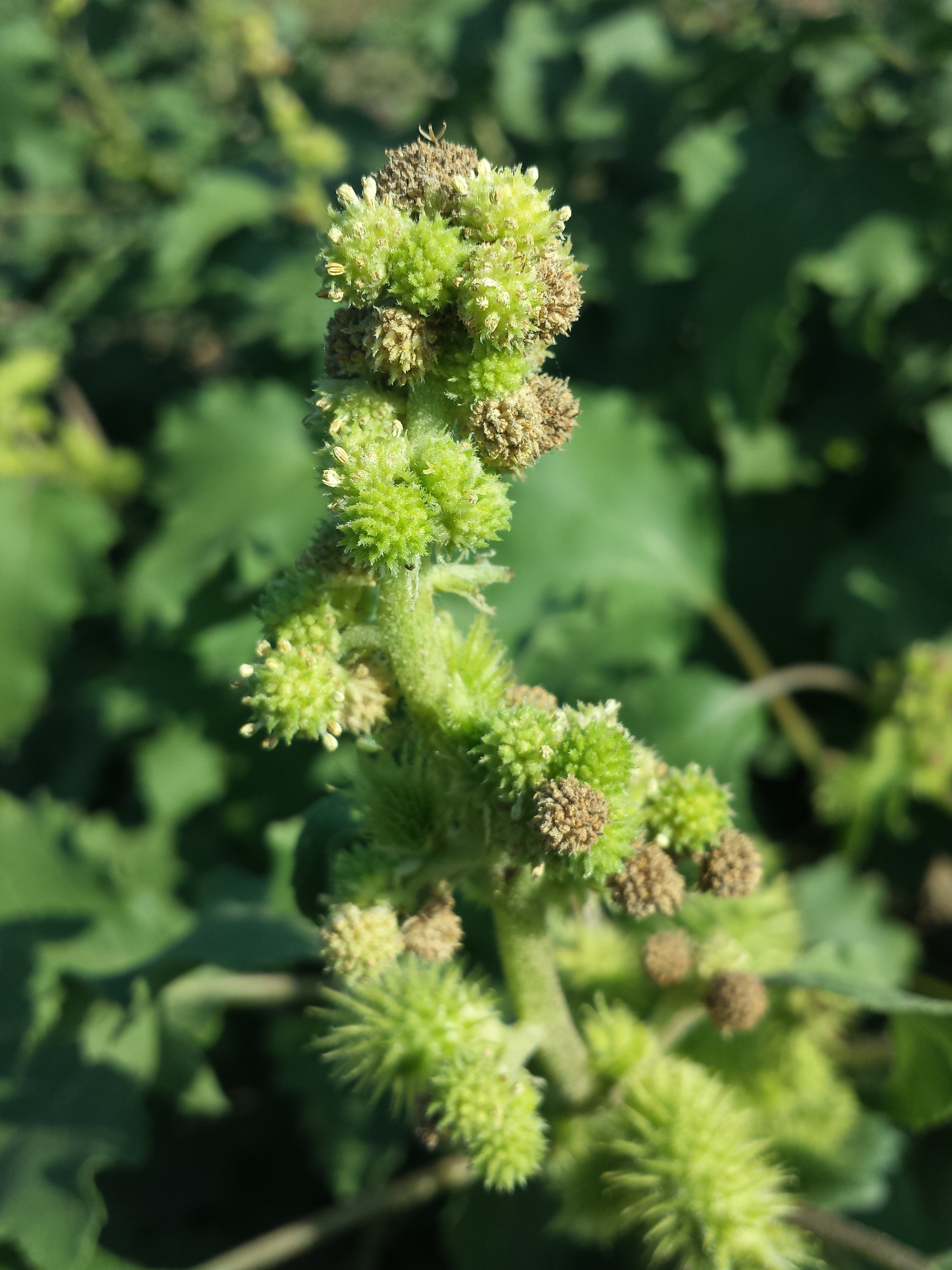

Scientific classification
- Kingdom: Plantae
- Clade: Tracheophytes
- Clade: Angiosperms
- Clade: Eudicots
- Clade: Asterids
- Order: Asterales
- Family: Asteraceae
- Tribe: Heliantheae
- Genus: Xanthium
- Species: X. orientale

Binomial name
- Xanthium orientale L.

Synonyms
- List: Xanthium acerosum Greene; Xanthium acutilobum Millsp. & Sherff; Xanthium acutum Greene; Xanthium affine Greene; Xanthium albinum (Widder) Scholz & Sukopp; Xanthium americanum Walter; Xanthium aridum H.St.John; Xanthium australe Millsp. & Sherff; Xanthium barcinonense Sennen; Xanthium brevirostre Hochst. ex A.Rich.; Xanthium brevirostre Wallr.; Xanthium bubalocarpon Bush; Xanthium californicum Greene; Xanthium calvum Millsp. & Sherff; Xanthium campestre Greene; Xanthium canadense Mill.; Xanthium cavanillesii Schouw; Xanthium cenchroides Millsp. & Sherff; Xanthium chinense var. globuliforme C.Shull; Xanthium chsei Fernald; Xanthium cloessplateaum D.Z.Ma; Xanthium commune Britton; Xanthium cordifolium Stokes; Xanthium crassifolium Millsp. & Sherff; Xanthium cuneatum Moench; Xanthium curvescens Millsp. & Sherff; Xanthium discolor Wallr.; Xanthium echinatum Murray; Xanthium fuscescens Jord. & Fourr.; Xanthium glabratum Britton; Xanthium glanduliferum Greene; Xanthium hispanicum Sennen; Xanthium homothalamum Spreng.; Xanthium italicum Moretti; Xanthium leptocarpum Millsp. & Sherff; Xanthium longirostre Wallr.; Xanthium macounii Britton; Xanthium macrocarpum var. italicum (Moretti) Nyman; Xanthium maculatum Raf.; Xanthium monoicum Gilib.; Xanthium nigri Ces., Pass. & Gibelli; Xanthium oligacanthum Piper; Xanthium oviforme Wallr.; Xanthium palustre Greene; Xanthium pensylvanicum Wallr.; Xanthium pungens var. denudatum Widder; Xanthium riparium Itzigs. & Hertzsch; Xanthium riparium Lasch; Xanthium ripicola Holub; Xanthium roxburghii Wallr.; Xanthium saccharatum Wallr.; Xanthium silphiifolium Greene; Xanthium speciosum Kearney; Xanthium sphaerocephalum Salzm. ex Ball; Xanthium strumarium var. canadense (Mill.) Torr. & A.Gray; Xanthium strumarium var. echinatum (Murray) A.Gray; Xanthium strumarium subsp. italicum (Moretti) D.Löve; Xanthium strumarium f. purpurascens Priszter; Xanthium strumarium var. wootonii (Cockerell) W.C.Martin & C.R.Hutchins; Xanthium varians Greene; Xanthium wootonii Cockerell

= Xanthium orientale =

Species of flowering plant

Xanthium orientale is a species of annual plant of the daisy family Asteraceae.

== Use by Native Americans ==
The Zuni people use the plant for multiple purposes. The chewed seeds are rubbed onto the body before the cactus ceremony to protect it from spines. A compound poultice of seeds is applied to wounds or used to remove splinters. The seeds are also ground, mixed with cornmeal, made into cakes, and steamed for food.
