= Cocklebur oil =

Oil made from the seeds of cockleburs

Cocklebur oil is obtained by pressing the seeds of cockleburs (Xanthium ssp.), plants that are otherwise considered an agricultural pest that can harm or kill livestock. The oil is similar to poppyseed oil, light yellow in color, and similar to sunflower oil in taste and smell.
