= Xanthium catharticum =

Scientific classification
- Kingdom: Plantae
- Clade: Tracheophytes
- Clade: Angiosperms
- Clade: Eudicots
- Clade: Asterids
- Order: Asterales
- Family: Asteraceae
- Tribe: Heliantheae
- Genus: Xanthium
- Species: X. catharticum

Binomial name
- Xanthium catharticum Kunth

Species of flowering plant

Xanthium catharticum is a flowering plant native to Chile, Argentina, and Ecuador. Medicinal drugs with antitumor properties have been extracted from the plant.
