= Myochrous magnus =

Scientific classification
- Kingdom: Animalia
- Phylum: Arthropoda
- Clade: Pancrustacea
- Class: Insecta
- Order: Coleoptera
- Suborder: Polyphaga
- Infraorder: Cucujiformia
- Family: Chrysomelidae
- Genus: Myochrous
- Species: M. magnus

Binomial name
- Myochrous magnus Schaeffer, 1904

Species of beetle

Myochrous magnus is a species of leaf beetle. It is found in Central America and North America. It was first described by the American entomologist Charles Frederic August Schaeffer in 1904.
