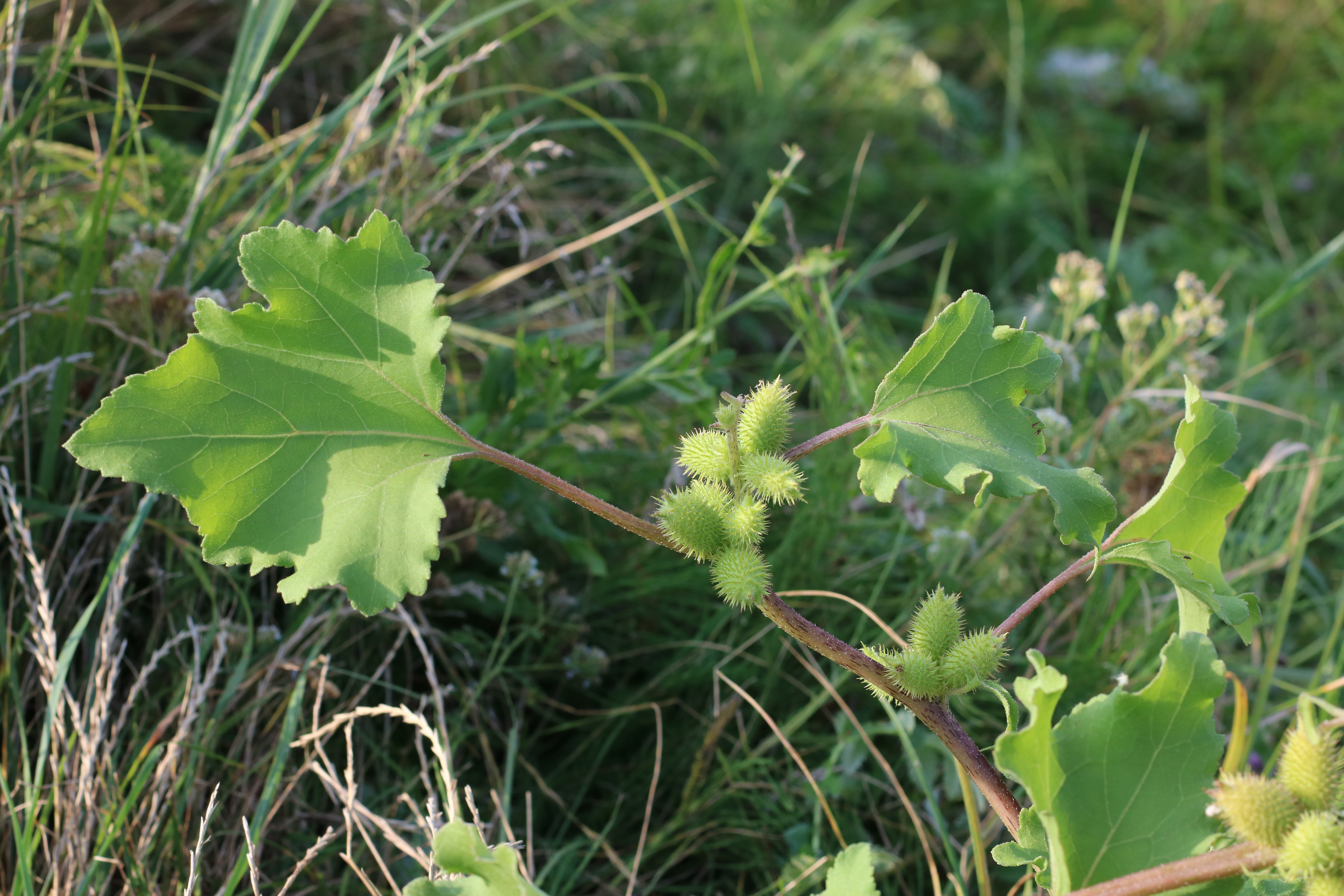
- Xanthium strumarium

Scientific classification
- Kingdom: Plantae
- Clade: Tracheophytes
- Clade: Angiosperms
- Clade: Eudicots
- Clade: Asterids
- Order: Asterales
- Family: Asteraceae
- Subfamily: Asteroideae
- Tribe: Heliantheae
- Subtribe: Ambrosiinae
- Genus: Xanthium; L.

Type species
- Xanthium strumarium L.

Synonyms
- Xanthium sect. Euxanthium DC.; Acanthoxanthium (DC.) Fourr.; Xanthium sect. Acanthoxanthium DC.

= Xanthium =

Genus of plants

Xanthium (cocklebur) is a genus of flowering plants in the tribe Heliantheae within the family Asteraceae, native to the Americas and eastern Asia and some parts of south Asia.

== Description ==
Cockleburs are coarse, herbaceous annual plants growing to 50–120 cm (20–47 in) tall. The leaves are spirally arranged, with deeply toothed margins. Some species, notably Xanthium spinosum, are also very thorny with long, slender spines at the leaf bases.

The flower heads are of two types; One, in short terminal branches, produces only pollen. The other, in clusters in the axils of the leaves, produces seed.

Unlike many other members of the family Asteraceae, whose seeds are airborne with a plume of silky hairs resembling miniature parachutes, cocklebur seeds are produced in a hard, spiny, globose or oval double-chambered, single-seeded bur 8–20 mm (0.32–0.79 in) long. It is covered with stiff, hooked spines, which stick to fur and clothing and can be quite difficult to detach. These burs are carried long distances from the parent plant during seed dispersal by help of animals (zoochorous).

== Biology ==
Cockleburs are short-day plants, meaning they only initiate flowering when the days are getting shorter in the late summer and fall, typically from July to October in the Northern Hemisphere. They can also flower in the tropics where the daylength is constant.

== Diversity ==
Over 200 names have been proposed for species, subspecies, and varieties within the genus. Most of these are regarded as synonyms of highly variable species. Some recognize as few as two or three species in the genus. The Global Compositae Checklist recognizes the following.

Accepted species

- Xanthium albinum (Widd.) Scholz & Sukopp – Mongolia
- Xanthium argenteum Widder – Chile
- Xanthium catharticum Kunth – Chile, Bolivia, Argentina
- Xanthium cavanillesii Shouw – Argentina
- Xanthium inaequilaterum DC. – China, India, Southeast Asia
- Xanthium mongolicum Kitag. – Mongolia
- Xanthium orientale L. – Europe, North Africa, Middle East
- Xanthium pungens Wallr. – Australia; naturalized in Eurasia
- Xanthium saccharosum
- Xanthium spinosum L. – spiny cocklebur, burreed, Bathurst burr – very widespread, nearly cosmopolitan
- Xanthium strumarium L. – clotbur, rough cocklebur, large cocklebur, common cocklebur – very widespread, nearly cosmopolitan

formerly included

- see Ambrosia
- Xanthium artemisioides – Ambrosia arborescens
- Xanthium fruticosum – Ambrosia arborescens

== Legal status ==
The cocklebur is legally listed as a noxious weed in the states of Arkansas and Iowa in the United States of America.

== Toxicity and uses ==
The common cocklebur (Xanthium strumarium) is a native of North America. It has become an invasive species worldwide. It invades agricultural lands and can be poisonous to livestock, including horses, cattle, and sheep. Some domestic animals will avoid consuming the plant if other forage is present, but less discriminating animals, such as pigs, will consume the plants and then sicken and die. The seedlings and seeds are the most toxic parts of the plants. Symptoms usually occur within a few hours, producing unsteadiness and weakness, depression, nausea and vomiting, twisting of the neck muscles, rapid and weak pulse, difficulty breathing, and eventually death.

The plant also has been used for making yellow dye, hence the name of the genus (Greek xanthos means 'yellow'). The many species of this plant, which can be found in many areas, may actually be varieties of two or three species. The seed oil is edible.

Xanthium strumarium is known as cang er zi (蒼耳子) in traditional Chinese medicine. Xanthium is also used to treat nasal and sinus congestion.

The spines and seeds of this fruit are rich in a chemical called carboxyatractyloside (CAT), formerly referred to as xanthostrumarin, which is the chemical that is responsible for most of the adverse effects from the use of cang er zi. CAT has been shown to be a growth inhibitor in Xanthium and other plants, serving two functions, delaying seed germination and inhibiting the growth of other plants. Most of the chemical is concentrated in the spines. When the bur is prepared as an herbal remedy, the spines are usually removed, reducing the CAT content of the finished product.

== Gallery ==
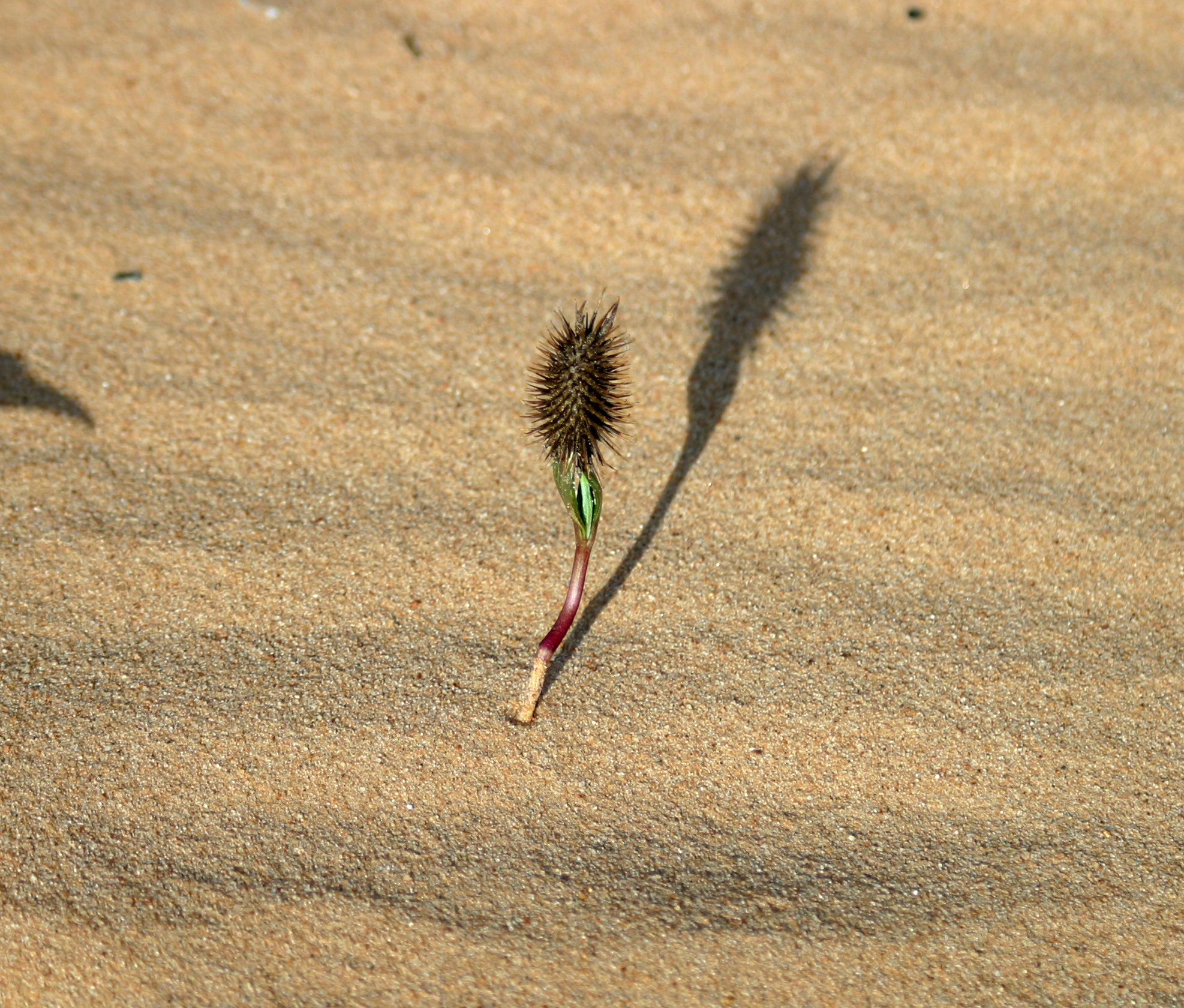
X. strumarium

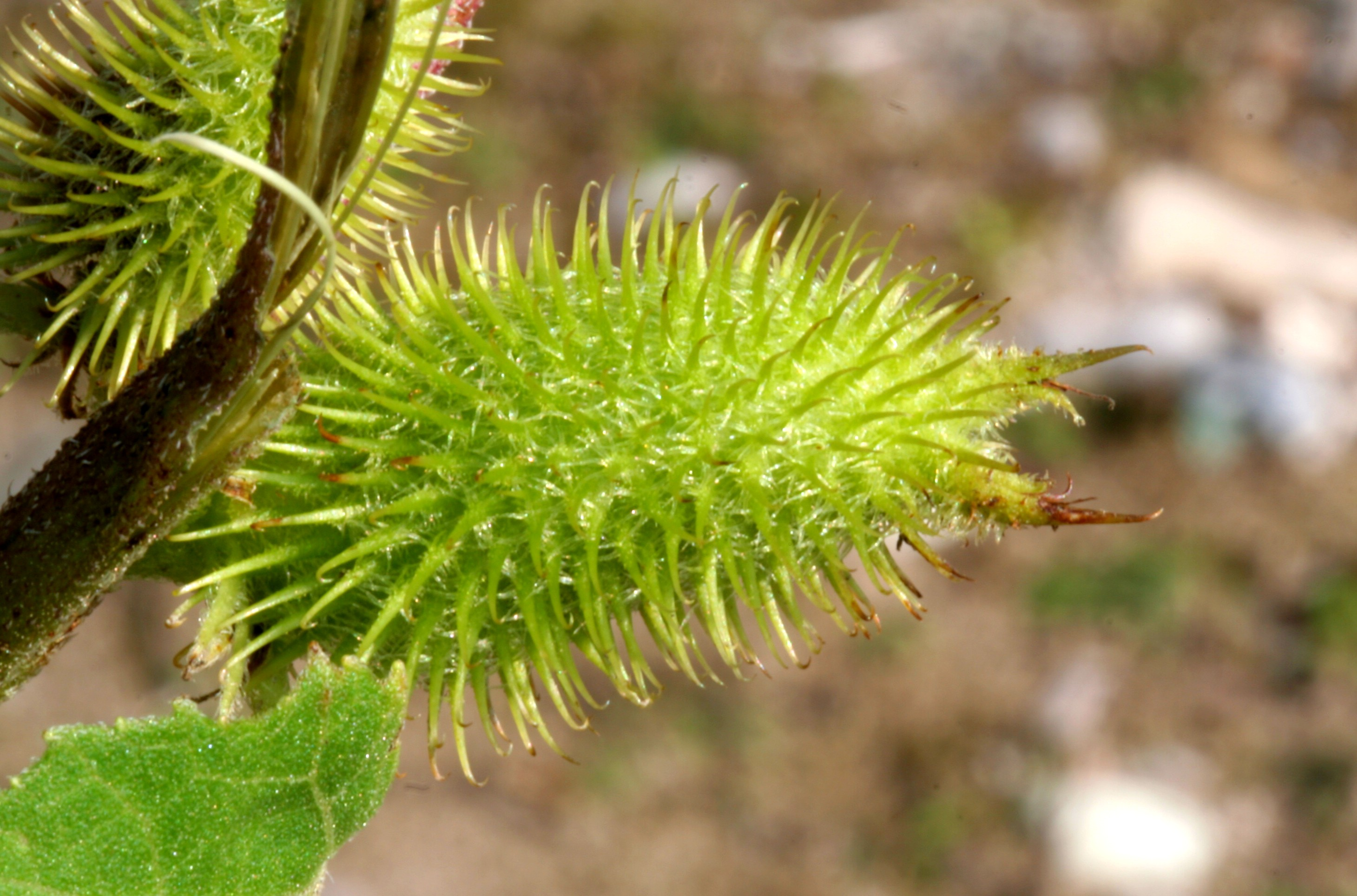
X. italicum

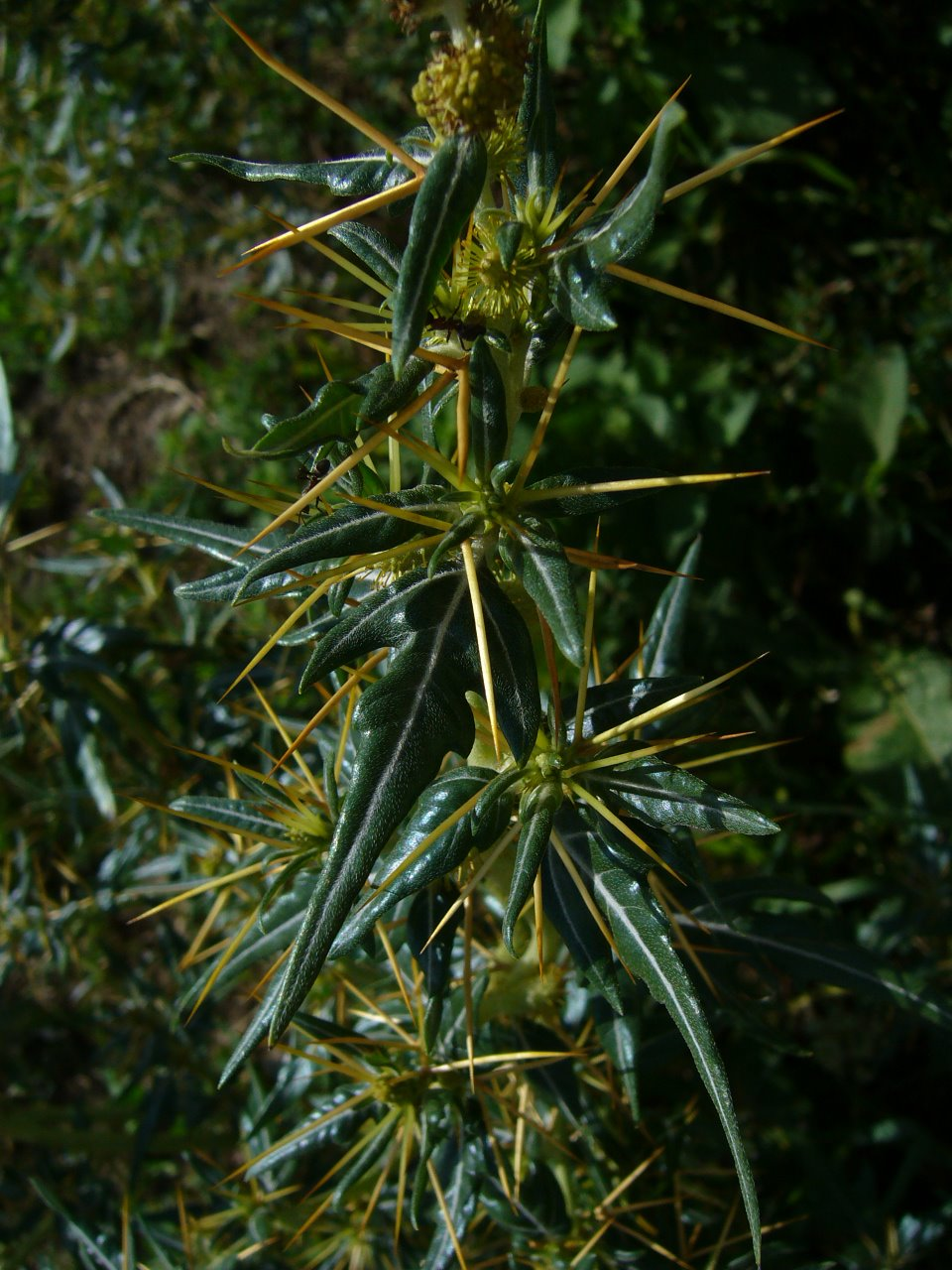
X. spinosum

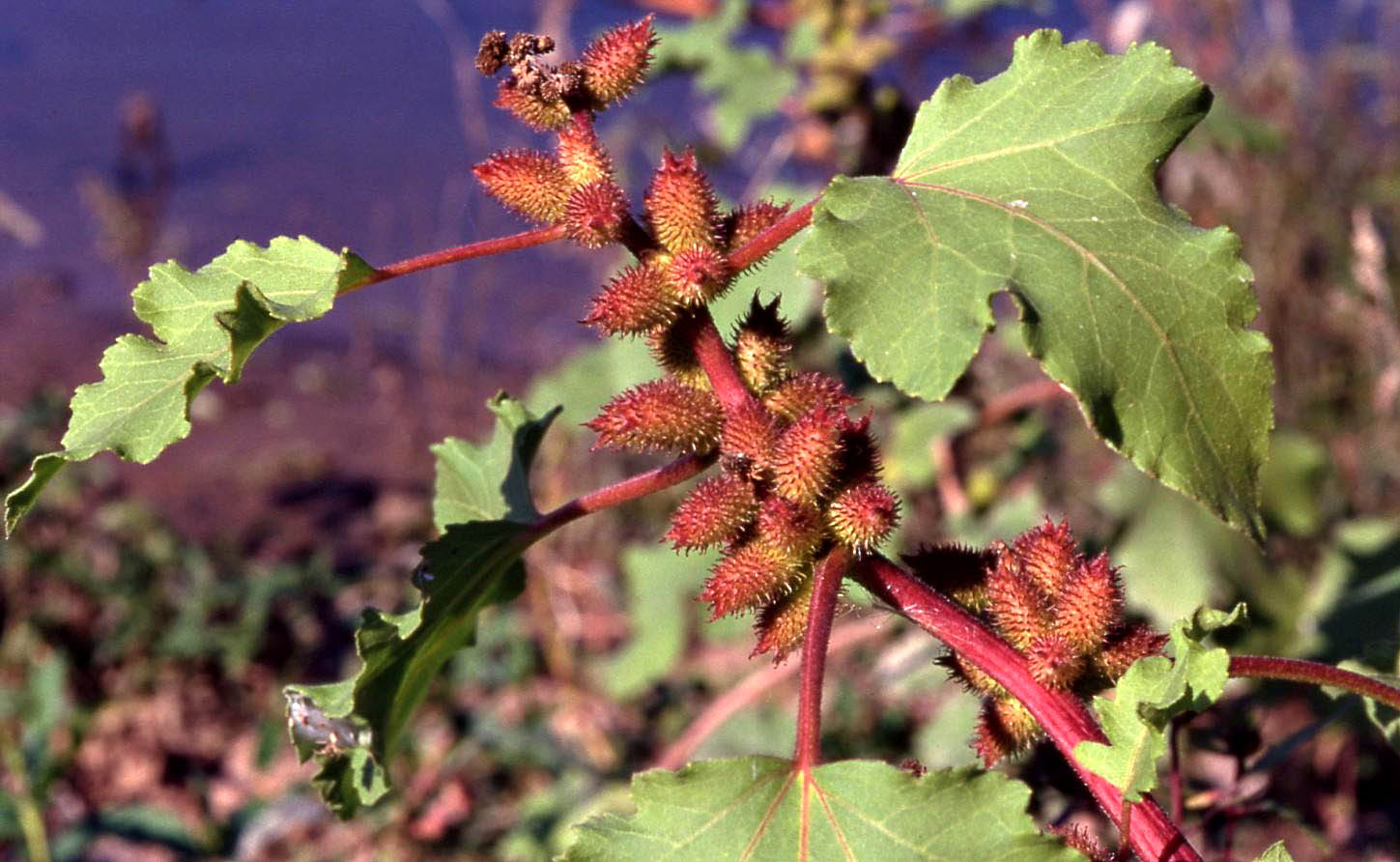
X. albinum

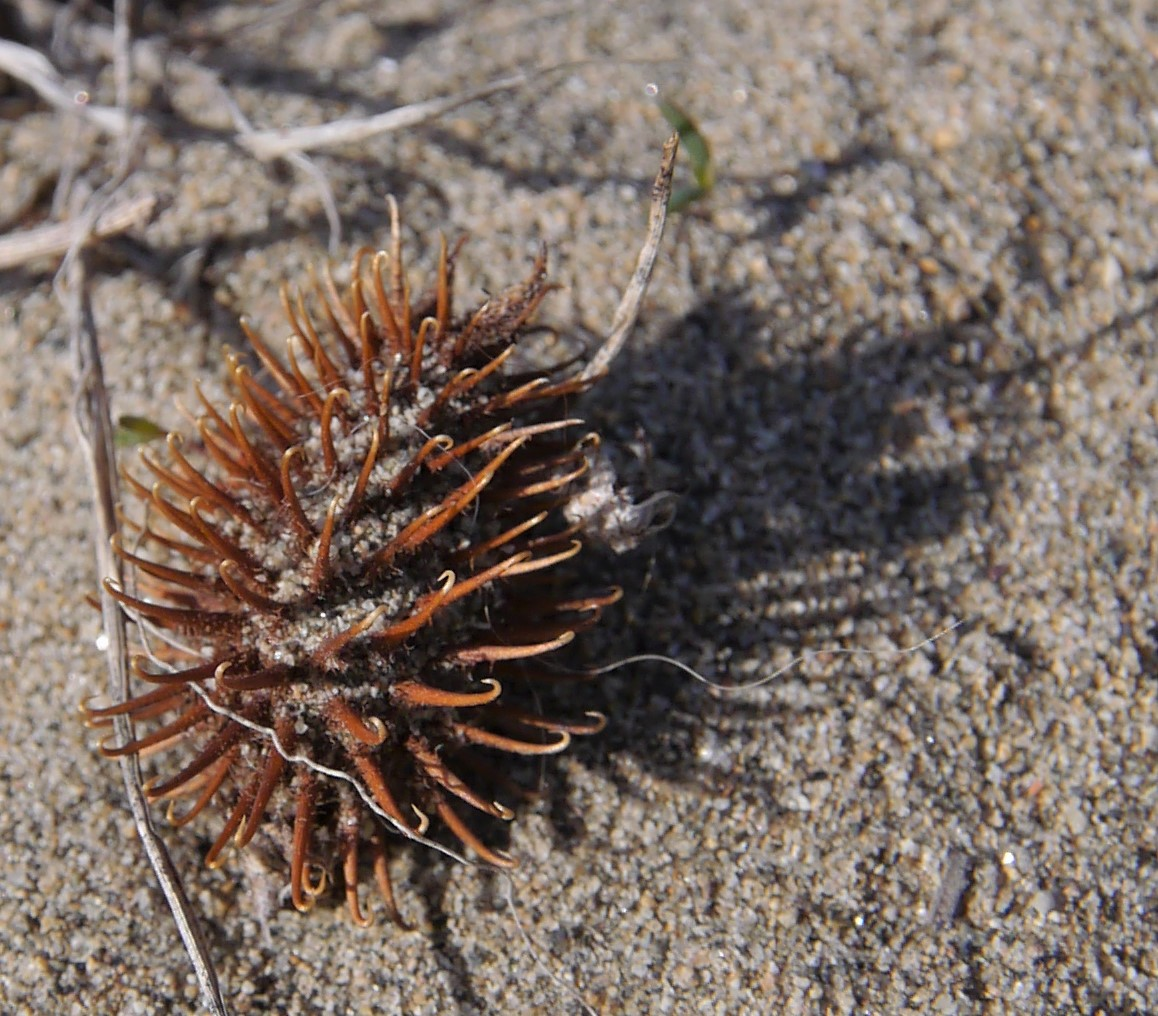
Unidentified Xanthium

== See also ==
- List of beneficial weeds
- List of companion plants
- List of plants poisonous to equines
