= Absolute democracy =

Hypothetical Form of Government

Absolute democracy is a hypothetical form of government presenting an extreme of power exercised directly by citizens.

Absolute democracy presents a risk that the interests of the majority will be prioritized while the needs of any minorities may be ignored. Although democracy in general strives to make the people content, absolute democracy lacks protections to allow the minority to be heard or acknowledged.

As Francis Devine explains in "Absolute Democracy or Indefeasible Right: Hobbes Versus Locke", there was a tension in American politics between absolute democracy and liberalism. Devine explains liberalism as, "the insistence that certain basic human freedoms are beyond abridgment".

Absolute democracy lacks protections commonly seen in modern democratic systems. For example, in an absolute democracy, there is no requirement for a "supermajority" to vote on any issue (i.e., every issue can be decided by a bare 50% vote). A requirement for a supermajority would be a limit on democracy, while absolute democracies are noted for their lack of such limits. As a result, policies may not be stable or long term, because everything is under scrutiny from the voters and may be overturned with a simple majority vote.

== See also ==
- Direct democracy
- Mob rule
- Radical democracy
