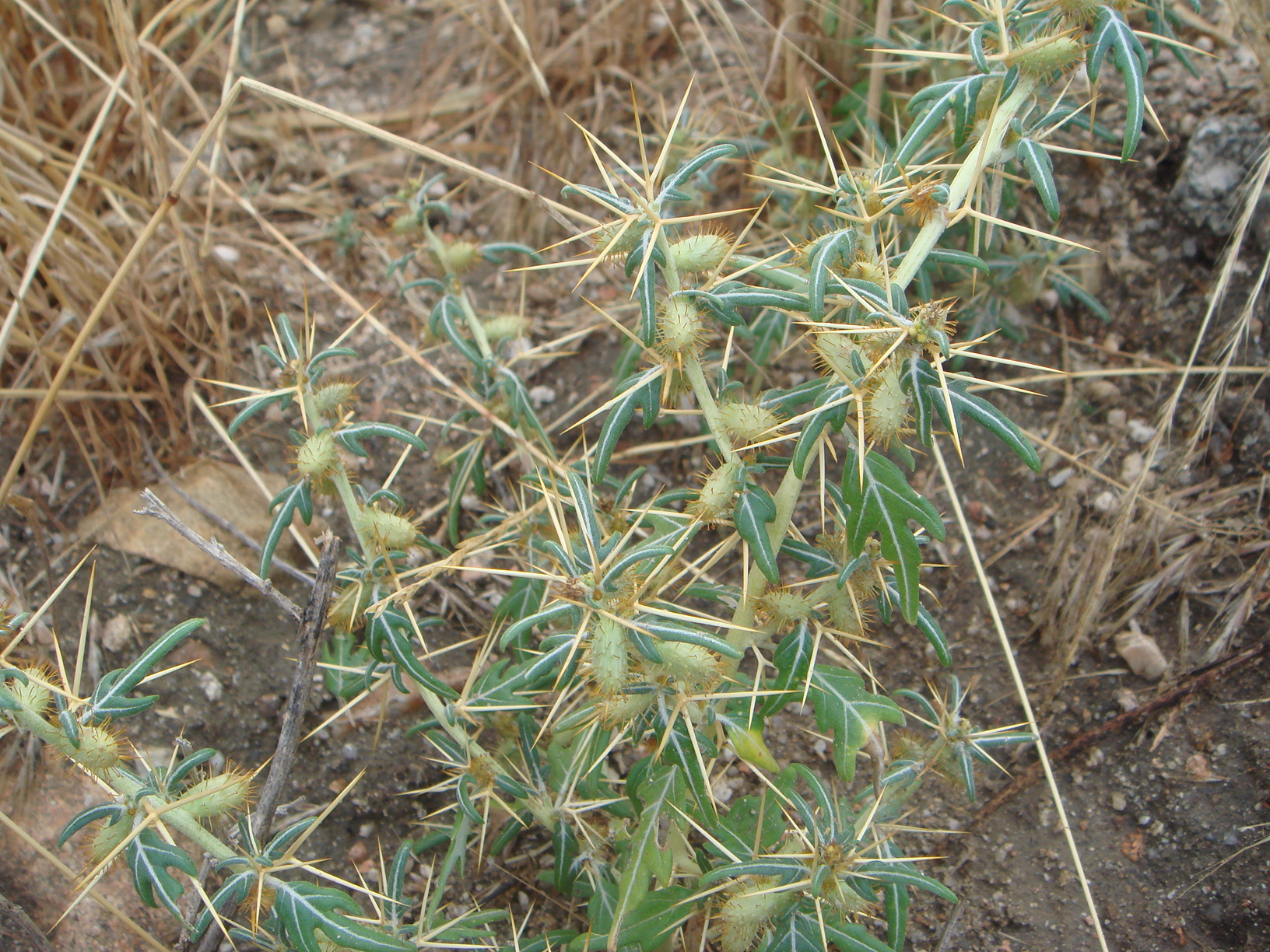

Scientific classification
- Kingdom: Plantae
- Clade: Tracheophytes
- Clade: Angiosperms
- Clade: Eudicots
- Clade: Asterids
- Order: Asterales
- Family: Asteraceae
- Tribe: Heliantheae
- Genus: Xanthium
- Species: X. spinosum

Binomial name
- Xanthium spinosum L.

= Xanthium spinosum =

Species of flowering plant

Xanthium spinosum (also known as Acanthoxanthium spinosum) is a species of flowering plant in the aster family known by many common names, including spiny cocklebur, prickly burweed and Bathurst burr. This species is part of the genus Xanthium that encompasses 25 different species of flowering plants of the daisy family, Asteraceae, and sunflower tribe.

== Distribution ==
It is known worldwide as a noxious weed that grows in many types of disturbed habitats such as pastures, crops, waterways, grasslands, flood plains, waste areas, and sometimes tropical and arid environments. Its original native range is not known but it may have come from South America, possibly from Chile. The plant is found in various regions across the world including Canada, the US, Central America, parts of Africa and the Middle East, China, Russia and Australia.

== Description ==
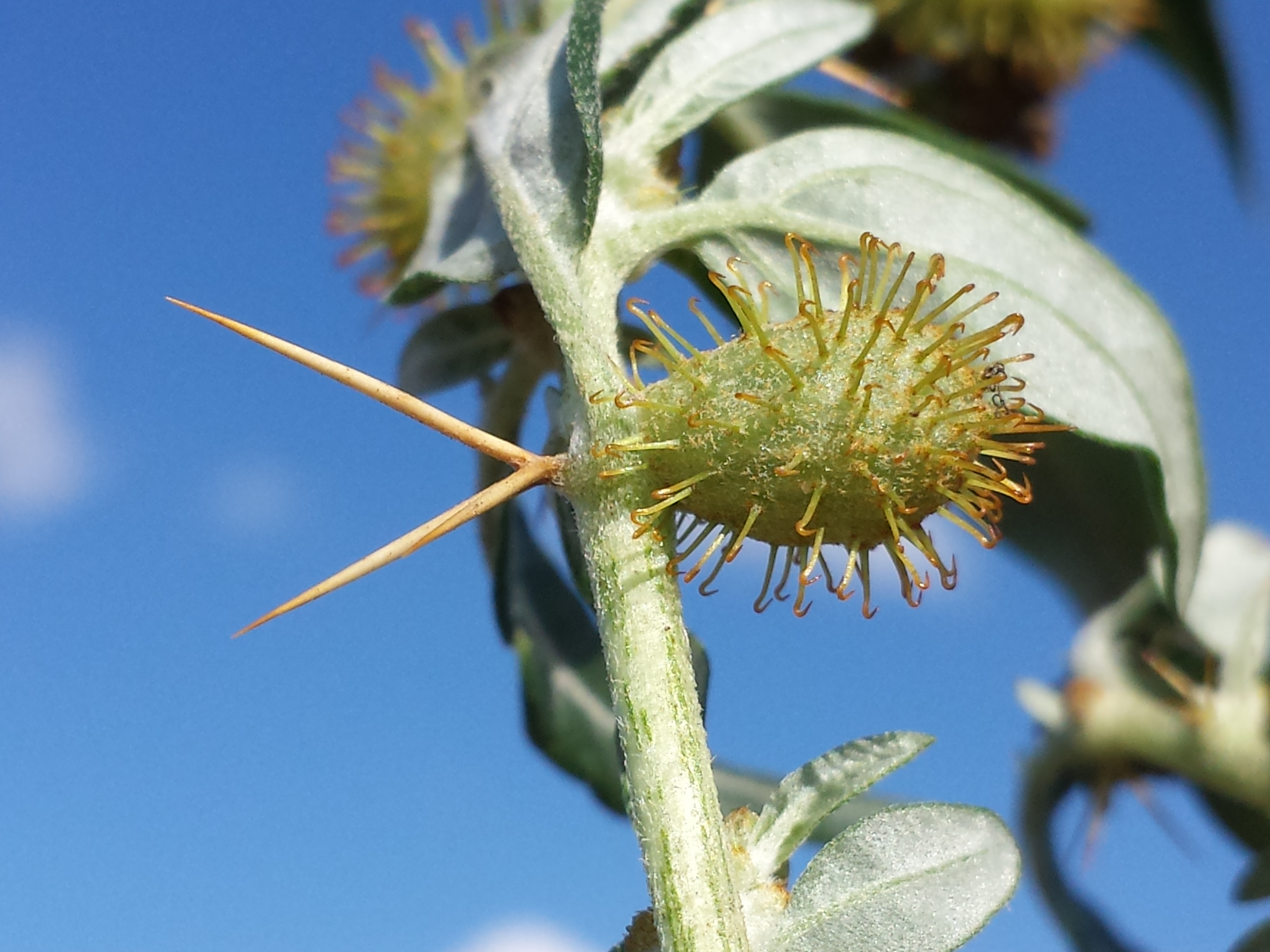
Burs of Xanthium spinosum

Xanthium spinosum is an upright, highly branched, dichotomous, annual herb producing a slender stem up to 1 metre (3 ft 3 in) tall or slightly taller. It is lined at intervals with very long, sharp, yellowish, three pronged spines which may exceed three centimeters in length. These spines are typically found at the base of each leaf fork.

The leaves are irregularly lobed or lance-shaped lobed, the middle is much longer than the others, and have white veins down the center. They are arranged spirally or alternately along the stem. Each is up to 10 or 12 centimeters long and are dark green or grayish on top, pale green or whitish underneath and are covered in downy hairs.

Xanthium spinosum flowers between summer and late fall, typically from July to October in the northern hemisphere. The plant produces male and female flower heads that are monoecious and form greenish axillary or solitary inflorescence clusters. The male flowers are bulbous and found in dense clusters at the tips of stems near the topmost leaves. Female flowers are found at the leaf forks on lower leaves and develop into burs. The burs are one or 1.5 centimeters long and covered in small hook-like spines. Each bur has two seeds inside it that are flattened and have a thick coat. The spiny burs are easily dispersed to new areas when they become attached to animals, people, and objects, or float on water.

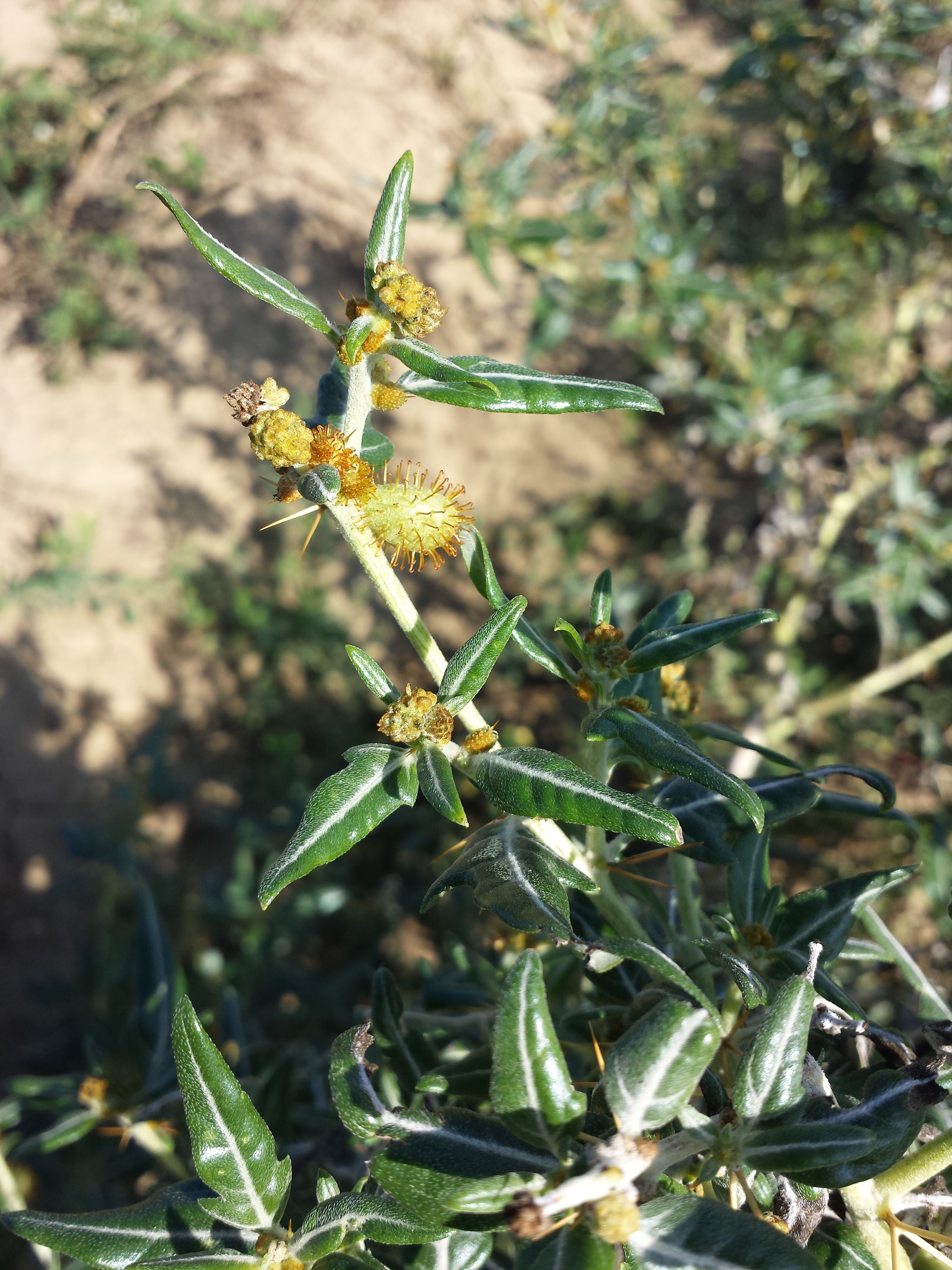
Xanthium spinosum plant with lobed leaves and white stripe down the middle

== Uses ==
Xanthium spinosum, as well as others within the genus, are used in many traditional medicinal treatments. The chloroform extracts found in the plant are used to treat numerous ailments such as hydrophobia, rabies, fevers, diarrhea, and cancer. In Chinese medicinal practices, the methanol extracts found in the leaves and fruits are used to treat inflammatory diseases such as rheumatoid arthritis. This species can also be toxic to humans, as it produces toxins that cause nephrotoxic effects, causing damage to the kidneys.

== Agricultural & ecological effects ==
Xanthium spinosum is classified as an invasive weed of many crops. This plant negatively impacts crops such as: cotton, maize, sunflowers, tomatoes, soybeans, sugarcane, and other annual or perennial crops. It decreases the health of the ecosystem it takes over and threatens the loss of the native species that inhabit the area as well as lowers the biodiversity. It also threatens the health and well being of the animals that inhabit the areas where it is found. If livestock ingests Xanthium spinosum, the livestock will become poisoned and could potentially make its way into a human. The plants, especially new seedlings, are toxic to livestock. This plant is also toxic to humans.

Bur damage to sheep's wool reduces its value.
