= Felix Widder =

Felix Widder may refer to:

- Félix Bódog Widder (1874–1939), Hungarian painter, graphic designer, teacher
- Felix Joseph Widder (1892–1974), Austrian mycologist and botanist
