= Myochrous squamosus =

Scientific classification
- Kingdom: Animalia
- Phylum: Arthropoda
- Clade: Pancrustacea
- Class: Insecta
- Order: Coleoptera
- Suborder: Polyphaga
- Infraorder: Cucujiformia
- Family: Chrysomelidae
- Genus: Myochrous
- Species: M. squamosus

Binomial name
- Myochrous squamosus LeConte, 1859

Species of beetle

Myochrous squamosus is a species of leaf beetle. It is found in North America.
