= Agonism =

Political theory emphasizing the positive aspects of conflict

Agonism (from Greek ἀγών agōn 'struggle') is a political and social theory that emphasizes the potentially positive aspects of certain forms of conflict. It accepts a permanent place for such conflict in the political sphere, but seeks to show how individuals might accept and channel this conflict positively. Agonists are especially concerned with debates about democracy, and the role that conflict plays in different conceptions of it. The agonistic tradition to democracy is often referred to as agonistic pluralism. A related political concept is that of countervailing power. Beyond the realm of the political, agonistic frameworks have similarly been utilized in broader cultural critiques of hegemony and domination, as well as in literary and science fiction.

== Theory of agonism ==
There are three elements shared by most theorists of agonism: constitutive pluralism, a tragic view of the world, and a belief in the value of conflict. Constitutive pluralism holds that there is no universal measure of adjudicating between conflicting political values. For example, Chantal Mouffe argues, following Carl Schmitt, that politics is built on the distinction of "us" and "them." Based on this, agonists also believe in "a tragic notion of the world without hope of final redemption from suffering and strife," which cannot find a lasting political solution for all conflicts. Instead, agonists see conflict as a political good. For example, Mouffe argues that "In a democratic polity, conflicts and confrontations, far from being a sign of imperfection, indicate that democracy is alive and inhabited by pluralism.”

Agonism is not simply the undifferentiated celebration of antagonism:

Agonism implies a deep respect and concern for the other; indeed, the Greek agon refers most directly to an athletic contest oriented not merely toward victory or defeat, but emphasizing the importance of the struggle itself—a struggle that cannot exist without the opponent. Victory through forfeit or default, or over an unworthy opponent, comes up short compared to a defeat at the hands of a worthy opponent—a defeat that still brings honor. An agonistic discourse will therefore be one marked not merely by conflict but just as importantly, by mutual admiration...

— Political theorist Samuel A. Chambers

Bonnie Honig, an advocate of agonism, writes: "to affirm the perpetuity of the contest is not to celebrate a world without points of stabilization; it is to affirm the reality of perpetual contest, even within an ordered setting, and to identify the affirmative dimension of contestation." In her book Political Theory and the Displacement of Politics, she develops this notion through critiques of consensual conceptions of democracy. Arguing that every political settlement engenders remainders to which it cannot fully do justice, she draws on Nietzsche and Arendt, among others, to bring out the emancipatory potential of political contestation and of the disruption of settled practices. Recognizing, on the other hand, that politics involves the imposition of order and stability, she argues that politics can neither be reduced to consensus, nor to pure contestation, but that these are both essential aspects of politics.

William E. Connolly is one of the founders of this school of thought in political theory. He promotes the possibility of an agonistic democracy, where he finds positive ways to engage certain aspects of political conflict. Connolly proposes a positive ethos of engagement, which could be used to debate political differences. Agonism is based on contestation, but in a political space where the discourse is one of respect, rather than violence. Unlike toleration, agonistic respect actively engages adversaries in political contests over meaning and power. Unlike antagonism, it shows respect by admitting the ultimate contestability of even one's own deepest held commitments. Agonism is a practice of democratic engagement that destabilizes appeals to authoritative identities and fixed universal principles. Connolly's critical challenges to John Rawls's theory of justice and Jürgen Habermas's theory on deliberative democracy have spawned a host of new literature in this area. His work Identity\Difference (1991) contains an exhaustive look at positive possibilities via democratic contestation.

== Agonistic pluralism ==
Agonistic pluralism, also referred to as "agonistic democracy," is primarily framed as an agonistic alternative to Habermasian models of deliberative democracy. Theorists of agonistic pluralism, including post-modernist thinkers Chantal Mouffe, Ernesto Laclau, and William E. Connolly, reject the Habermasian notion of a rational universal consensus that can be reached through deliberation alone. In order for a singular rational consensus to be reached, this would require that all parties endorse the same starting ethico-political principles. Yet, in multicultural pluralist societies, agonistic pluralists contend that this will never truly be the case, since divergent social identities will create irreconcilable differences between individuals. It is argued that Habermasian models of deliberative democracy are ill-equipped for pluralist societies, since they simply purport new paradigms of liberal democratic theory, which rely on the same rationalistic, universalistic, and individualistic theoretical frameworks.

Furthermore, agonistic pluralists argue that power cannot be relegated solely to the private sphere, and power hierarchies will necessarily be replicated in public deliberative processes. This makes it such that any "consensus" relies on forms of social domination and necessitates the exclusion of certain interests. Many of these agonistic thinkers point to the ideological entrenchment of global neoliberalism as evidence of how presumed consensus can reinforce hegemony and preclude opposition. The strong influence of Antonio Gramsci in agonistic theory can be seen here, primarily with his theory of cultural hegemony and his claim that any established consensus or norm is reflective of broader structures of power. Thus, for agonistic pluralists, if reason alone cannot yield a legitimate uniform consensus, and power imbalances can never truly be removed from the public sphere, then one must accept the inevitability of conflict in the political realm.

Rather than attempting to wholly eliminate conflict in the political, which agonistic pluralists maintain is conceptually impossible, agonistic pluralism is the model of democracy which attempts to mobilize these passions "towards the promotion of democratic designs." Agonistic pluralists emphasize how the construction of group identities relies on a continuous "other"; this us/them conflict is inherent to politics, and it should be the role of democratic institutions to mitigate such conflicts. The role of agonistic pluralism is to transform antagonistic sentiments into agonistic ones. As Mouffe writes, "this presupposes that the 'other' is no longer seen as an enemy to be destroyed, but somebody with whose ideas we are going to struggle but whose right to defend those ideas we will not put into question." Agonistic pluralists view this conversion of "enemies" into "adversaries" as being fundamental to well-functioning democracies and the only way to properly limit domination.

=== Criticisms of agonistic pluralism ===
One criticism of agonistic pluralism is that, in its rejection of deliberative democracy, it inadvertently relies on the same fundamental presuppositions of rational consensus. Andrew Knops argues that agonistic pluralists, such as Chantal Mouffe, assert a "single, universal characterization of the political" in their depiction of the political as a realm of ineradicable antagonism and conflict. For Knops, this universalistic description of the political undermines agonistic pluralists' post-structuralist critiques of rational argumentation. Others build on this criticism, arguing that agonists' focus on passions, power, and the limits of reason ultimately reduces the persuasive capacity of their political and social theories, which remain largely reliant on the process of rationalization.

Another criticism of agonistic pluralism is its failure to provide a real avenue through which antagonism can be transformed into agonism, or enemies into adversaries. Agonistic pluralists maintain that, in order to mediate antagonism, all parties must share some ethico-political principles. For instance, a successful agonistic pluralism requires that all parties share commitments to democratic ideals such as "equality" and "liberty," although the contents of these normative conceptions can vary greatly across groups. Yet, it is argued by critics of agonistic pluralism that, on the one hand, if parties share the same ethico-political principles, then a consensus need not be prohibited through ineradicable conflict. On the other hand, if individuals do not share the ethico-political principles needed to reach a consensus, then critics argue there is little reason to conceive that antagonism can be reduced into anything less. Under a framework under which there are no shared ethico-political commitments, there is also no normative basis for prohibiting the use of political violence. Finally, critics contend that this lack of common understanding not only problematizes the transformation of antagonism into something else, but it further contradicts the essence of antagonism itself. It is argued that deliberation is constitutive of conflict, insofar as antagonism requires a certain degree of understanding of the "other" and an ability to use shared speech acts to explain points of divergence with opposing parties; this becomes difficult to do under an agonistic framework.

=== Market agonism ===
Market agonism is a proposed economic theory that applies agonistic principles to markets, treating competition and contestability as primary ends of economic life rather than as instruments toward profit maximization or redistribution. In its own presentation, the thesis describes the approach as consistent with earlier agonistic frameworks in political theory, including Mouffe's agonistic pluralism and related accounts of agonistic democracy associated with Connolly and Honig, while relocating these principles to economic institutions. According to its proponent, the framework emphasizes institutional design intended to prevent entrenched, structurally dominant positions by keeping market advantages temporary and routinely challengeable, and by maintaining open entry and legible rules for contestation.

In its own presentation, market agonism treats ongoing contest as a basic condition of economic life, describing an "economic agon" as a continuous arena in which competing economic agents (such as state firms, private firms, individuals, cooperatives, and organizations) test claims to value, efficiency, and capability under shared and transparent rules, with outcomes understood as temporary and revisable. The thesis frames economic freedom primarily in terms of exposure to challenge and ease of entry, and presents equality as equality of entry and not equality of outcomes.

The thesis also proposes mechanisms intended to keep positions contestable and to reduce durable insulation from challenge, including periodic requalification of dominant positions and time-limited privileges. It describes an agonistic economy in terms of the interaction between ownership (control over productive assets), labour (participation in production), and access (conditions of entry and participation, including information and infrastructure). It additionally uses the term agonistic sovereignty for a role tasked with maintaining the openness and fairness of contestation through rule-setting and adjudication in opposition to outcome selection.

== Critical conceptions ==
Other works have invoked conceptions of agonism and the agon in a more critical sense beyond that of political counter-hegemony. This usage of agonism has been explored at some length by Claudio Colaguori in his book Agon Culture: Competition, Conflict and the Problem of Domination. According to Colaguori, "the agon is literally the arena of competition, the scene of contest, and the locus of adversarial conflict." He continues, writing "The philosophy of agonism affirms the idea that transcendence, truth, and growth are generated from the outcome of the contest...the concept of agonism is often understood in an affirmative sense as the generative principle of economy, society and even natural ecology and personal growth... The ambivalent character of agonism is that it is often seen as a mode of transcendence, while its instrumental relation to the mode of destruction is rarely acknowledged."

For Theodor Adorno, agonism is also about the "theodicy of conflict" where opponents "want to annihilate one another... to enter the agon, each the mortal enemy of each." Agonism forms part of the instituted social order where society "produces and reproduces itself precisely from the interconnection of the antagonistic interests of its members." Adorno also sees agonism as the underlying principle in Hegel's dialectic of history where "dialectic" (i.e., growth through conflict) is the ontology of the wrong state of things. The right state of things would be free of them: "neither a system nor a contradiction." Colaguori reconstructs the concept of the agon to invoke this critical, destructive aspect as a way of extending Adorno's critique of modern domination and to identify how the normalization and naturalization of conflict is used as an ideology to justify various forms of domination and subjugation. The agonistic ideology that has been appropriated by popular culture for example makes use of agonistic themes to celebrate competition as the wellspring of life in such a way as to normalize "a military definition of reality."

The critical conception of agonism developed by Colaguori and Adorno emphasizes how aspects of competition can be utilized to reinforce the project of domination that is evident in the geopolitics of modernity. Colaguori suggests that a critical conception of agonism can be applied to the study of "numerous forms of social conflict in gender, class and race relations where the competitive mode of interaction prevails in the formation of social hierarchies based on competition as a form of exclusion." Colaguori further states that, "after 100 years of technological progress, human societies are trapped in a perpetual dynamic of conflict and crisis, with modernization at a standstill. While this dialectic of development and destruction has been analysed from political and economic perspectives, Agon Culture offers an analysis of the human condition through an examination of the way in which the cultural ideology of competition operates as a mode of rationality that underpins the order of domination."

== Agonism in fiction ==
The 2005 science fiction novel Lady of Mazes by Karl Schroeder depicts a post-human future where "agonistics" is the ruling principle of the Solar System. The story explains agonistics by writing, "You can compete, and you can win, but you can never win once-and-for-all." A character gives two examples of agonism: a presidency with term limits, and laws aimed at preventing corporate monopolies.

== See also ==
- Empowered democracy
- Moral relativism
- Pluralism
- Radical democracy
- Value pluralism
