= Nathan Widder =

American political philosopher

Education
- Education: Johns Hopkins University (BA), London School of Economics (MSc), University of Essex (PhD)
- Doctoral advisors: Sue Golding, Ernesto Laclau

Philosophical work
- Era: Contemporary philosophy
- Region: Western philosophy
- School: Continental philosophy Post-structuralism
- Institutions: London School of Economics, University of Exeter, Royal Holloway, University of London
- Main interests: Political philosophy

Nathan Widder (/ˈwɪdər/) is an American-born political philosopher whose work engages with the history of Western political thought and philosophy, contemporary Continental philosophy, and feminist political theory.

== Work ==
Widder has done research and published widely on questions of difference, pluralism, power, identity, and knowledge, and he has drawn on ideas in contemporary thought in order to stage a re-engagement with both central and marginal figures in ancient, early Christian, and medieval philosophy. He received his Ph.D. from Essex University under the supervision of celebrated political theorists Ernesto Laclau and Sue Golding. He also has an MSc (Econ) Political Theory from The London School of Economics, and a BA Political Science from Johns Hopkins University, where he was a student of William E. Connolly.

Widder is Professor of Political Theory at Royal Holloway, University of London, where he was Head of the Politics and International Relations department (2009–13).

Widder has published articles in prominent journals, including Angelaki, Continental Philosophy Review, Contemporary Political Theory, European Journal of Political Theory, History of Political Thought, Parallax, Philosophy and Social Criticism, Philosophy Today, Political Theory, and Theory & Event. His article 'Foucault and Power Revisited' is consistently one of the most widely-read on the topic.

He has also produced four major studies, Genealogies of Difference (University of Illinois Press, 2002), Reflections on Time and Politics (Penn State University Press, 2008), Political Theory after Deleuze (Continuum Press, 2012), and Gilles Deleuze and the Philosophy of Sense (State University of New York Press, 2026).

== Bibliography ==
- Genealogies of Difference (University of Illinois Press, 2002)
- Reflections on Time and Politics (Penn State University Press, 2008)
- Political Theory after Deleuze (Continuum, 2012)
- Gilles Deleuze and the Philosophy of Sense (State University of New York Press, 2026)
