= Yannis Stavrakakis =

Greek–British political scientist

- Born: 1970 (age 55–56)

Education
- Education: University of Essex (PhD)
- Thesis: New Directions in the Theory of Ideology and the Case of Green Ideology (1996)
- Doctoral advisor: Ernesto Laclau

Philosophical work
- Era: Contemporary philosophy
- Region: Western philosophy
- School: Continental philosophy
- Institutions: Aristotle University of Thessaloniki
- Main interests: Political philosophy
- Notable ideas: Lacanian left

Yannis Stavrakakis (Greek: Γιάννης Σταυρακάκης; born 1970) is a Greek-British political philosopher. A member of the Essex School of discourse analysis, he is mainly known for his explorations of the importance of psychoanalytic theory (Freud and Lacan) for contemporary political and cultural analysis and for his discourse studies on populism and anti-populism.

== Education and academic career ==
Stavrakakis was born in Sheffield, England. He studied political science at Panteion University (Athens) and discourse analysis at Essex University. He received his MA and PhD degrees from the 'Ideology and Discourse Analysis' programme at the University of Essex. His doctoral thesis, completed under the supervision of Ernesto Laclau, was entitled ‘New Directions in the Theory of Ideology and the Case of Green Ideology’.

From 1998 onwards he has worked at the Universities of Essex and Nottingham and at the Postgraduate Programme of the Department of Political Science and History of Panteion University. In 2006 he was appointed Associate Professor at the School of Political Sciences of the Aristotle University of Thessaloniki. He has since been promoted to Professor of Political Discourse Analysis and has served as Head and deputy Head of School. He is currently Director of the School’s Postgraduate Programme in Political Theory and of the Laboratory for the Study of Democracy (DemLab).

Stavrakakis has also been twice elected in the executive board of the Hellenic Political Science Association, where he has served as Vice-President. Within the framework of the Association, he has co-founded a Research Network dedicated to the analysis of political discourse. He was also one of the founding co-conveners of the Populism Specialist Group of the Political Studies Association (UK).

== Work ==
His research interests include contemporary political theory (with emphasis on psychoanalytic and post-structuralist approaches), the analysis of ideology and political discourse in societies of late modernity (with emphasis on the study of political ecology, populism and post-democracy) and the political dimensions of artistic practices and theater. During the last two decades, his work has focused on the political and psychosocial implications of what he calls "debt societies" of Southern Europe (especially Greece) and on the emerging ideological cleavage between populist and anti-populist discourses within this context. During the 2014-5 period he has served as Principal Investigator of the POPULISMUS research project, co-funded by the European Union. The research focus of the project was on the relationship between populist discourse and democracy and it involved a variety of research and dissemination activities as well as the creation of an international Observatory of populist discourse.

He has authored and co-edited many books in English and Greek and has published numerous articles in journals such as: Journal of Political Ideologies; Journal for Lacanian Studies; Psychoanalysis, Culture and Society; Philosophy and Social Criticism; Constellations; South European Society and Politics; Journal of Modern Greek Studies; Theory, Culture and Society; Third Text; Organization Studies; Journal of Language and Politics; Planning Theory. He is contributing editor of the journal Psychoanalysis, Culture and Society (Palgrave) and member of the editorial boards of Subjectivity (Palgrave), Journal for Lacanian Studies and Synchrona Themata.

== Books ==
- Stavrakakis, Yannis (1999). Lacan and the Political. London, New York: Routledge. ISBN 9780415171878.
- Stavrakakis, Yannis, Norval, Aletta; Howarth, David (eds.) (2000). Discourse theory and political analysis: identities, hegemonies, and social change. Manchester, New York: University Press. Distributed exclusively in the U.S.A. by St. Martin's Press. ISBN 9780719056642.
- Stavrakakis, Yannis; Glynos, Jason (2002). Lacan and Science. London: Karnac Books. ISBN 9781855759213.
- Stavrakakis, Yannis (2007). The Lacanian left: Psychoanalysis, Theory, Politics. Edinburgh / Albany: Edinburgh University Press / SUNY Press. ISBN 9780748619801.
- Stavrakakis, Yannis (ed.) (2019). The Routledge handbook of psychoanalytic political theory. London, New York: Routledge. ISBN 9781315524771.
- Stavrakakis, Yannis (2024). Populist Discourse: Recasting populism research. London, New York: Routledge. ISBN 9781032284927.
- Stavrakakis, Yannis; Katsambekis, Giorgos (eds.) (2024). Research Handbook on Populism. Cheltenham: Edward Elgar. ISBN 9781800379688.
