= Chantal Mouffe =

Belgian post-Marxist political theorist (born 1943)

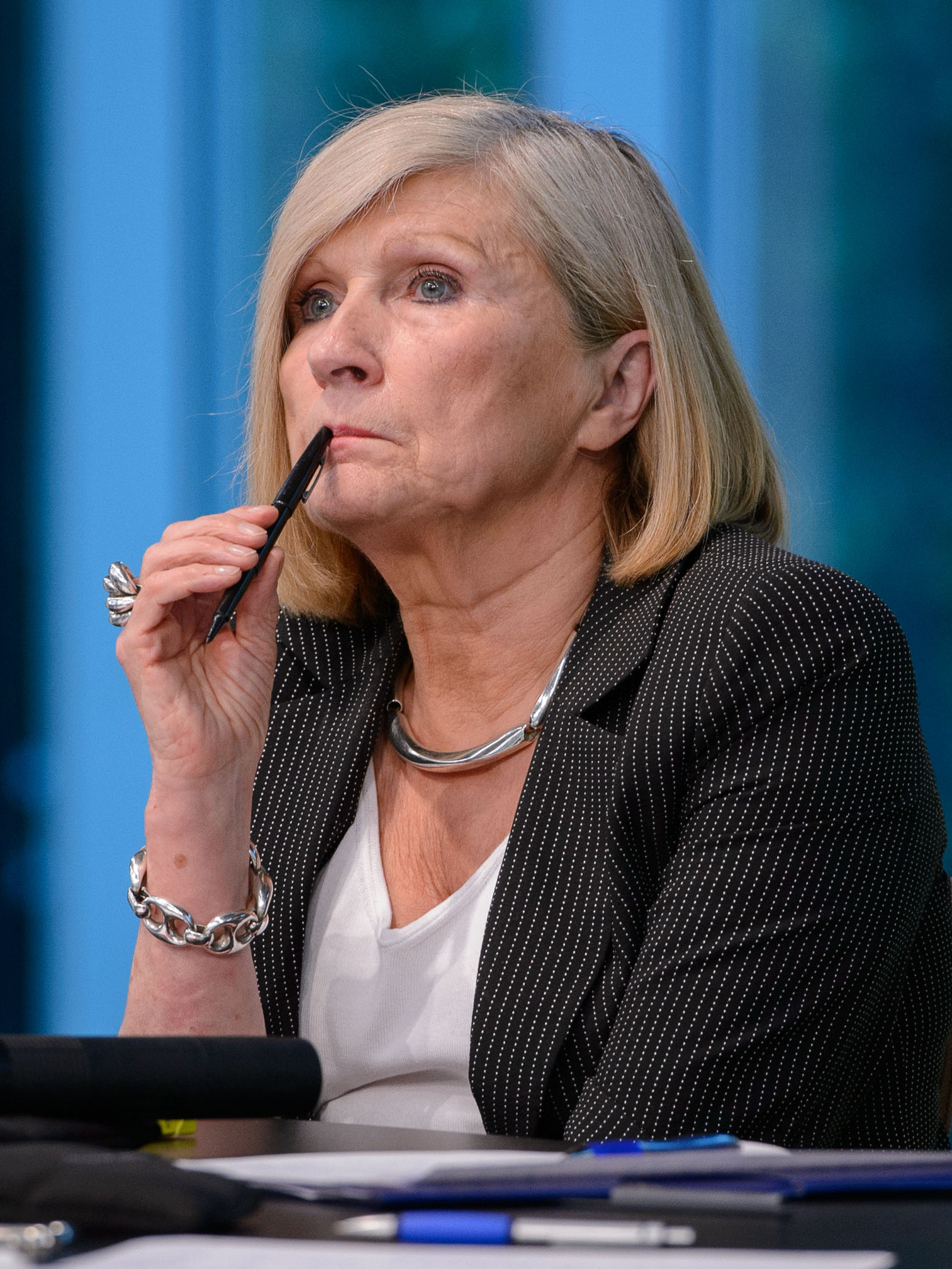
- Mouffe in 2013
- Born: 17 June 1943 (age 83); Charleroi, Belgium
- Spouse: Ernesto Laclau (m. 1975; died 2014)

Education
- Education: Université catholique de Louvain; University of Essex (PhD)
- Academic advisor: Louis Althusser

Philosophical work
- Era: Contemporary philosophy
- Region: Western philosophy
- School: Continental philosophy Post-Marxism; Essex School of discourse analysis
- Institutions: University of Westminster; CIPh; CNRS
- Main interests: Political philosophy
- Notable ideas: Agonism, criticism of deliberative democracy, conflict-oriented model of radical democracy

Chantal Mouffe (French: [muf]; born 17 June 1943) is a Belgian political theorist and philosopher, teaching at University of Westminster. She is best known for her and Ernesto Laclau's contribution to the development of the so-called Essex School of discourse analysis. She is a strong critic of deliberative democracy and advocates a conflict-oriented model of radical democracy.

== Education ==
Chantal Mouffe studied at the Universities of Leuven, Paris and Essex and has worked in many universities throughout the world (in Europe, North America and Latin America). She has also held visiting positions at Harvard, Cornell, Princeton and the CNRS (Paris). During 1989–1995, she served as Programme Director at the Collège international de philosophie in Paris. She currently holds a professorship at the Department of Politics and International Relations, University of Westminster in the United Kingdom, where she is a member of the Centre for the Study of Democracy.

== Work ==
She developed a type of post-Marxist political inquiry drawing on Gramsci, post-structuralism and theories of identity, and redefining Leftist politics in terms of radical democracy. With Laclau she co-authored her most frequently cited publication Hegemony and Socialist Strategy, and she is also the author of influential works on agonistic political theory, including Agonistics: Thinking the World Politically and The Democratic Paradox. Her book For a Left Populism was published in 2018.

A prominent critic of deliberative democracy (especially in its Rawlsian and Habermasian versions), she is also known for her use of the work of Carl Schmitt, mainly his concept of "the political", in proposing a radicalization of modern democracy—what she calls "agonistic pluralism". She has developed an interest in highlighting the radical potential of artistic practices. Mouffe's Agonistics: Thinking the World Politically (2013) has been criticised by Timothy Laurie for its strong focus on State institutions, noting that Mouffe's "professed enthusiasm for (some) non-Western Islamist movements is solely conditional upon their assumption of State instruments".

=== Critical ===
The sociologist Pierre Birnbaum believes that Chantal Mouffe's theory is "fundamentally foreign to any Marxist or even socialist demonstration, and also contrary to any sociological analysis." He particularly calls into question her recourse to voters' emotions rather than their reason, "in an explicit rejection of the rationalist tradition of the Enlightenment embodied by Jürgen Habermas", but also of "the essentials of contemporary political theory"; according to the sociologist, Chantal Mouffe's thought is "an interpretation of the foundations of mobilization certainly inspired explicitly by the experiences of Latin America, but which seems to find its distant origin in the rants, in the 19th century, of Gustave Le Bon or of Gabriel Tarde."

== Honors ==
- Doctorate, honoris causa, University of Valparaíso, Chile (2014).
- Doctorate, honoris causa, University of Costa Rica (2019).
- Doctorate, honoris causa, KU Leuven, Belgium (2019).

== Publications ==
- (ed.) Gramsci and Marxist Theory. London – Boston: Routledge / Kegan Paul, 1979.
- (with Ernesto Laclau) Hegemony and Socialist Strategy: Towards a Radical Democratic Politics. London – New York: Verso, 1985.
- (ed.) Dimensions of Radical Democracy: Pluralism, Citizenship, Community. London – New York: Verso, 1992.
- The Return of the Political. London – New York: Verso, 1993.
- Le politique et ses enjeux. Pour une démocratie plurielle. Paris: La Découverte/MAUSS, 1994.
- (ed.) Deconstruction and Pragmatism. London – New York: Routledge, 1996.
- (ed.) The Challenge of Carl Schmitt. London – New York: Verso, 1999.
- The Democratic Paradox. London – New York: Verso, 2000.
- (ed.) Feministische Perspektiven. Wien: Turia + Kant, 2001.
- (ed.) The legacy of Wittgenstein: Pragmatism or Deconstruction. Frankfurt am Main – New York: Peter Lang, 2001.
- On the Political. Abingdon – New York: Routledge, 2005.
- Hegemony, Radical Democracy, and the Political, edited by James Martin, London: Routledge, 2013.
- Agonistics: Thinking The World Politically. London – New York: Verso, 2013.
- Mouffe C, 1995 ‘Post-marxism: democracy and identity’, Environment and Planning D vol.13 pp. 259–266 ML: P305 E30.
- (in conversation with Íñigo Errejón) Podemos: In the Name of the People (trans. Sirio Canos), London: Lawrence & Wishart, 2016.
- For a Left Populism. London – New York: Verso, 2018.
- Towards a Green Democratic Revolution. London - New York: Verso, 2022.

== See also ==
- List of deconstructionists
