= Paul Chatterton =

British geographer

Paul Chatterton is a British geographer and Professor of Urban Futures in the School of Geography at the University of Leeds. He is a co-author of Urban Nightscapes (2003), a study of youth nightlife and corporate influence on urban leisure, and was one of the founders of Lilac, a cohousing co-operative in Bramley, Leeds, that opened in 2013.

== Research ==
Chatterton's early research with the sociologist Robert Hollands looked at young people's nightlife and the commercial development of city centres. Their book Urban Nightscapes: Youth Cultures, Pleasure Spaces and Corporate Power was published by Routledge in 2003. It was reviewed in the American Journal of Sociology by David Grazian.

He later turned to low-carbon housing, writing about Lilac in a 2013 article for the International Journal of Urban and Regional Research. His later books are Low Impact Living: A Field Guide to Ecological, Affordable Community Building (Routledge, 2015), Unlocking Sustainable Cities: A Manifesto for Real Change (Pluto Press, 2018) and How to Save the City: A Guide for Emergency Action (2023).

== Lilac cohousing ==
Chatterton was a co-founder and the secretary of Lilac (Low Impact Living Affordable Community), a member-led housing co-operative in Bramley, west Leeds. When Leeds City Council granted planning permission for its 20 homes in May 2011, the Yorkshire Post reported that it was believed to be the first affordable ecological cohousing project in the United Kingdom. The homes, built from timber and straw bale, opened in 2013. In 2015 the Yorkshire Evening Post described Chatterton as having started the project with a group of like-minded people.

== Climate Action Leeds ==
Chatterton has been involved in Climate Action Leeds, a five-year community programme funded by the National Lottery, since its start. The programme launched in October 2021 with the aim of helping Leeds reach zero carbon by the 2030s.
