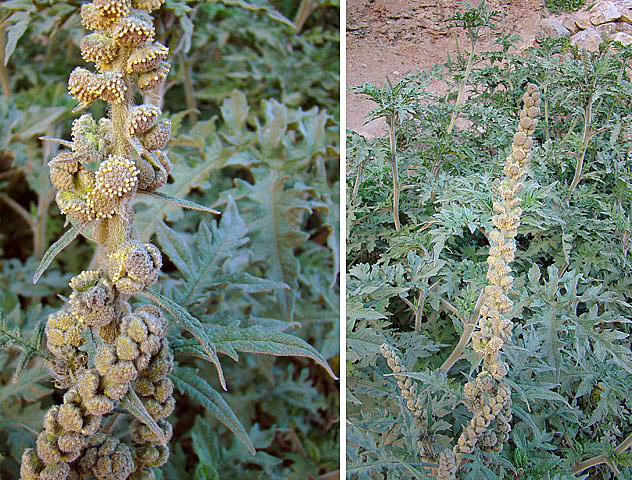

Scientific classification
- Kingdom: Plantae
- Clade: Tracheophytes
- Clade: Angiosperms
- Clade: Eudicots
- Clade: Asterids
- Order: Asterales
- Family: Asteraceae
- Genus: Ambrosia
- Species: A. arborescens

Binomial name
- Ambrosia arborescens Mill.

= Ambrosia arborescens =

Species of plant

Ambrosia arborescens is a species of plant in the family Asteraceae. It is native to the Andes from Colombia south to Bolivia.

In its native range, A. arborescens is used as a medicinal plant with analgesic, antiinflammatory and antiseptic properties.
