= Felix Joseph Widder =

Austrian mycologist, botanist, and naturalist

Felix Joseph Widder (16 December 1892 – 5 September 1974) was an Austrian mycologist, botanist, and naturalist.

The standard author abbreviation Widder is used to indicate this person as the author when citing a botanical name.
