= Hegemony and Socialist Strategy =

1985 book by Chantal Mouffe and Ernesto Laclau

- Cover to the 2nd Edition
- Authors: Chantal Mouffe and Ernesto Laclau
- Language: English
- Subject: Political theory
- Publisher: Verso (New Left)
- Publication date: 1985
- Publication place: United Kingdom
- Media type: Print (hardcover and paperback)
- Pages: 197 (first edition)
- ISBN: 0860910679 (Verso)
- OCLC: 67440480

Hegemony and Socialist Strategy: Towards a Radical Democratic Politics is a 1985 work of political theory in the post-Marxist tradition by Ernesto Laclau and Chantal Mouffe. Developing several sharp divergences from the tenets of canonical Marxist thought, the authors begin by tracing historically varied discursive constitutions of class, political identity, and social self-understanding, and then tie these to the contemporary importance of hegemony as a destabilized analytic which avoids the traps of various procedures Mouffe and Laclau feel constitute a foundational flaw in Marxist thought: essentializations of class identity, the use of a priori interpretative paradigms with respect to history and contextualization, the privileging of the base/superstructure binary above other explicative models.

== Organization ==
The book is divided into four chapters (~50 pages each). The first two chapters deal with conceptual developments in the manner of an intellectual history, albeit with much more of an eye to disputation and intervention than traditional intellectual history employs. Specifically, Chapter 1 discusses the work of Rosa Luxemburg, Karl Kautsky, Eduard Bernstein, and Georges Sorel (among other texts by major thinkers in the Marxist tradition). Chapter 2's discussion of Gramsci's conception of cultural hegemony is followed by Chapter 3's more politicized development of Laclau and Mouffe's own arguments regarding hegemony's character and constitution. Finally, the fourth chapter argues for the relevance of hegemony as an analytic for the understanding and governance of contemporary politics, political engagement, and self-understanding on the Left.

== Reception ==
Hegemony and Socialist Strategy was greeted with positive reviews and has become a reference point in its field; for example, Marxist philosopher Slavoj Žižek cited Hegemony and Socialist Strategy as a work having influenced his book, The Sublime Object of Ideology. Furthermore, its resolutely "post-Marxist" self-definition marks it as one of the first major texts associated with this disciplinary development. A new edition was published in 2001, which included a preface by the authors in which they reaffirmed their commitment to the arguments made in 1985.

The concept had a great influence on the theory of social movements and post-colonial research and marked the emergence of post-Marxism in the social sciences. The work also inspired the political movements Podemos and La France insoumise.

Norman Geras, in a New Left Review article titled "Post-Marxism?", lambasted Laclau and Mouffe for what he regarded as shallow obscurantism grounded on basic misunderstandings of both Marx and Marxism. After Laclau's and Mouffe's response to Geras' paper (in "Post-Marxism without apologies"), Geras doubled down with "Ex-Marxism Without Substance: Being A Real Reply to Laclau and Mouffe" in which he further criticised the post-Marxist turn.

== Bibliography ==
- Smith, Anna Marie. Laclau and Mouffe: The Radical Democratic Imaginary. — London: Routledge, 1998.
- Howarth, David. Discourse. — Milton Keynes: Open University Press, 2000.
- Philips, Louise, Jorgensen, Marianne. Discourse Analysis as Theory and Method. — London: Sage, 2002.
- Howarth, David, Aletta Norval and Yannis Stavrakakis (eds). Discourse Theory and Political Analysis. — Manchester: Manchester University Press, 2002.
- Critchley, Simon and Oliver Marchart (eds). Laclau: A Critical Reader. — London: Routledge, 2004.
- Breckman, Warren. Adventures of the Symbolic: Postmarxism and Radical Democracy. — New York: Columbia University Press, 2013.
- Howarth, David and Jacob Torfing (eds). Discourse Theory in European Politics. — Houndmills: Palgrave, 2005.
- Torfing, Jacob. New Theories of Discourse: Laclau, Mouffe, Žižek. — Oxford: Blackwell, 1999.
- Jacobs, Thomas. The Dislocated Universe of Laclau and Mouffe: An Introduction to Post-Structuralist Discourse Theory — Critical Review 30(3-4), 2018.
