= Ernesto Laclau =

Argentine philosopher and political theorist

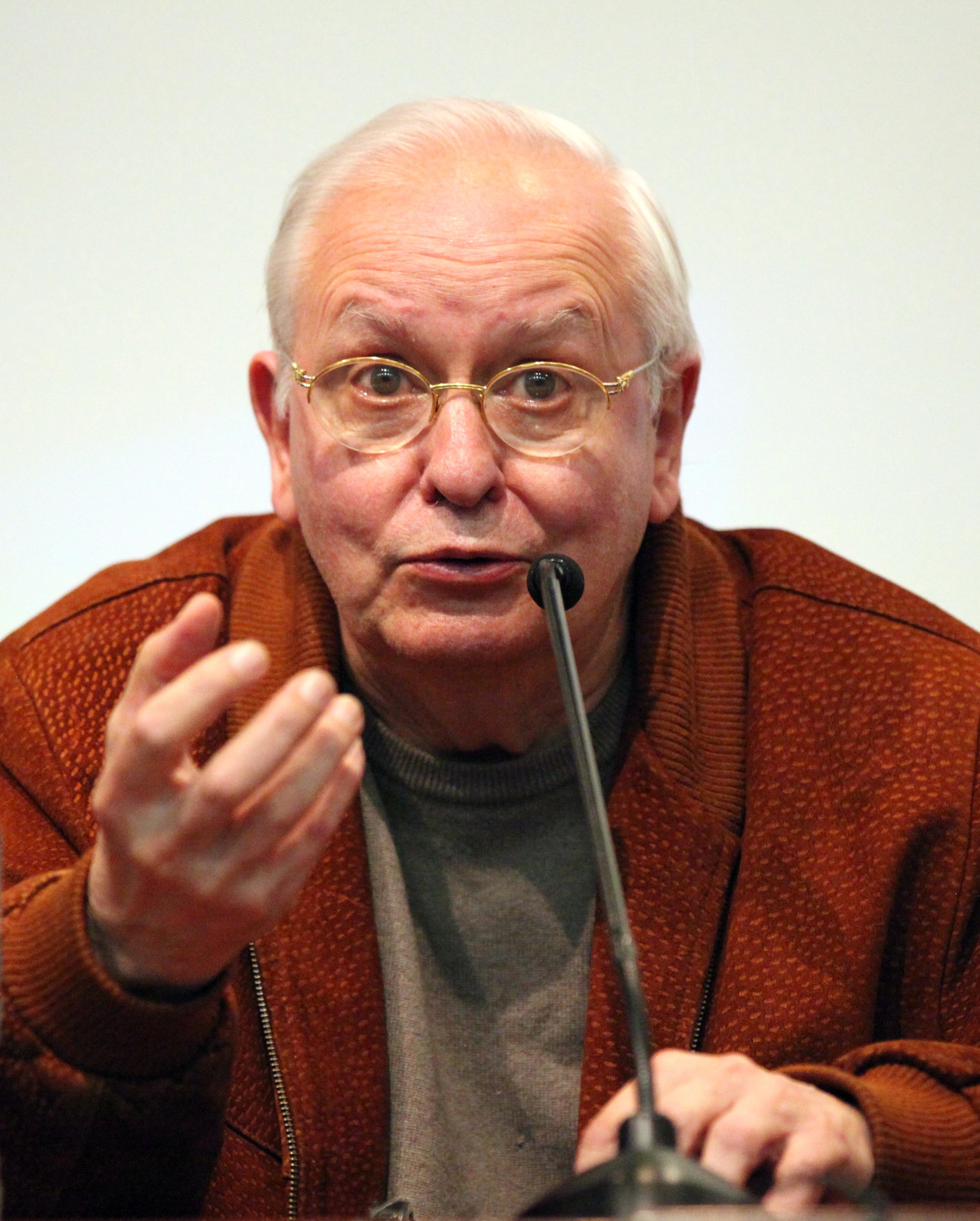
- Ernesto Laclau in 2012
- Born: 6 October 1935; Buenos Aires, Argentina
- Died: 13 April 2014 (aged 78); Seville, Spain
- Spouse: Chantal Mouffe (m. 1975)

Education
- Education: University of Buenos Aires (BA); St Antony's College, Oxford; University of Essex (PhD)
- Academic advisor: Eric Hobsbawm

Philosophical work
- Era: Contemporary philosophy
- Region: Western philosophy
- School: Continental philosophy Post-Marxism; Essex School of discourse analysis
- Institutions: University of Essex; Northwestern University; University at Buffalo; University of Buenos Aires; National University of Tucumán; Torcuato di Tella Institute
- Doctoral students: Yannis Stavrakakis; Nathan Widder
- Main interests: Political philosophy · hegemony
- Notable ideas: Criticism of Marxist economic determinism

Ernesto Laclau (Spanish: [laˈklaw]; 6 October 1935 – 13 April 2014) was an Argentine political theorist and philosopher. He is often described as an 'inventor' of post-Marxist political theory. He is well known for his collaborations with his long-term partner, Chantal Mouffe.

He studied history at the University of Buenos Aires Faculty of Philosophy and Letters, graduating with a licenciatura in 1964, and received a PhD from the University of Essex in 1977.

From 1986, he served as Professor of Political Theory at the University of Essex, where he founded and directed for many years the graduate programme in Ideology and Discourse Analysis, as well as the Centre for Theoretical Studies in the Humanities and the Social Sciences. Under his directorship, the Ideology and Discourse Analysis programme has provided a research framework for the development of a distinct type of discourse analysis that draws on post-structuralist theory (especially the work of Saussure, and Derrida), post-analytic thought (Wittgenstein, and Richard Rorty) and psychoanalysis (primarily the work of Lacan) to provide innovative analysis of concrete political phenomena, such as identities, discourses and hegemonies. This theoretical and analytical orientation is known today as the Essex School of discourse analysis.

Over his career Laclau lectured extensively in many universities in North America, South America, Western Europe, Australia, and South Africa. He also held positions at SUNY Buffalo and Northwestern University, both in the US.

== Biography ==
Laclau studied history at the University of Buenos Aires and was a member of the PSIN (Socialist Party of the National Left) until 1969, when the British historian Eric Hobsbawm supported his admission to St Antony's College, Oxford, where he pursued graduate research until 1972. He had close links with Jorge Abelardo Ramos, the founder of the PSIN, although he stated in 2005 that the latter had evolved in a direction he did not appreciate. In the same interview, he claimed that he came from a Yrigoyenista family, and that the Peronist politician Arturo Jauretche, a strong opponent of Justo's dictatorship during the Infamous Decade of the 1930s, was a close friend of his father.

In his later years, he had close ties with the Argentine Socialist Confederation (Spanish: Confederación Socialista Argentina), and in Argentina he is associated with Peronism.

Laclau died of a heart attack in Seville in 2014.

== Work ==
Laclau's early work was influenced by Althusserian Marxism and focused on issues debated within Neo-Marxist circles in the 1970s, such as the role of the state, the dynamics of capitalism, the importance of building popular movements, and the possibility of revolution. Laclau's most significant book is Hegemony and Socialist Strategy, which he co-authored with Chantal Mouffe in 1985. The position outlined in this book is usually described as post-Marxist because it rejects (a) Marxist economic determinism and (b) the view that class struggle is the most important antagonism in society. In their 2001 introduction to the second edition Laclau and Mouffe commented on this label, stating that whilst 'post-Marxist' they were also 'post-Marxist': their work, though a departure from traditional Western Marxism, retained similar concerns and ideas. A key innovation in Hegemony and Socialist Strategy was Laclau and Mouffe's argument that left-wing movements need to build alliances with a wide variety of different groups if they are to be successful and establish a left-wing 'hegemony'. In the final chapter of the book, the project of "radical and plural democracy" was advocated: a democracy in which subjects accept the importance of the values of liberty and equality, but fight over what the terms mean.

In Hegemony and Socialist Strategy Laclau and Mouffe also offered a constructivist account of 'discourse'. By drawing on the work of the later Wittgenstein, they argued that social entities only become meaningful through both linguistic and non-linguistic discursive articulation. As such, the meaning of something is never pre-given but is, instead, constructed through social practices. In a later summary of his view, Laclau claims there is support for this broad sense of discourse in Saussure. "By discourse... I do not mean something that is essentially restricted to the areas of speech and writing, but any complex of elements in which relations play the constitutive role. This means that elements do not pre-exist the relational complex but are constituted through it. Thus 'relation' and 'objectivity' are synonymous. Saussure asserted that there are no positive terms in language, only differences — something is what it is only through its differential relations to something else."

Laclau subsequently used this account of discourse to re-consider the nature of identity, arguing that all political identities are discursive - even if they are experienced by individuals as 'natural' (even to the point where one's identity is not recognised as an identity). For example, though an individual may think that they are just 'born male' this is, for Laclau not the case: 'maleness' is a socially constructed category that has no innate meaning.

In his more recent works, Laclau returned to a topic that was prevalent in his earliest writings: populism. In On Populist Reason, Laclau considered the nature of populism in political discourse, the creation of a popular hegemonic bloc such as "the people", and the importance of affect in politics. Building on his earlier work, Laclau argued that the basis of populism lies in the creation of "empty signifiers": words and ideas that express a universal idea of justice, and symbolically structure the political environment. Against those who see populism as a threat to democracy, Laclau argued that it is an essential component of it.

Before his death, Laclau was working on a book titled Elusive Universality, in which he sought to reconcile the tension between universalism and particularism by proposing that universality is always incomplete and constituted through the articulation of particular demands of subaltern groups.

=== Relationship with Slavoj Žižek ===
Laclau is known for his long standing dialogue with Lacanian "arch-Marxist" Slavoj Žižek. This dates back to at least 1989, when Laclau wrote the introduction to Žižek's first book in English (The Sublime Object of Ideology). Žižek is widely recognized as responsible for Laclau's increased acceptance of Lacanian ideas and his essay "Beyond Discourse Analysis", which was published in Laclau's New Reflections on the Revolutions of Our Time (1990), provided a psychoanalytic critique of Laclau's work. In 2000, Laclau, Žižek and Judith Butler published the trialogue Contingency, Hegemony, Universality, in which each responded to the others' works in a three-essay cycle. Although Žižek and Laclau noted their similarities and mutual respect, significant political and theoretical differences emerged between all three interlocutors. Following several acrimonious publications in the early 2000s, Laclau wrote in On Populist Reason (2005) that Žižek had an impractical and confused approach to politics, describing him as "waiting for the Martians". Their disagreement escalated in the pages of Critical Inquiry in 2006, when in a spate of essays the two argued in an increasingly hostile manner about political action, Marxism and class struggle, Hegel, populism, and the Lacanian Real. More recently in a 2014 interview with David Howarth, Laclau stated that his relationship with Žižek had deteriorated due to the latter adopting a "frantic ultra-Leftist stance, wrapped in a Leninism of kindergarten".

== Bibliography ==
- Politics and Ideology in Marxist Theory (NLB, 1977)
- Laclau, Ernesto; Mouffe, Chantal (2001) [1985]. Hegemony and Socialist Strategy. London: Verso Books. ISBN 9781859843307.
- New Reflections on the Revolution of our Time (Verso, 1990)
- The Making of Political Identities (editor) (Verso, 1994)
- Emancipation(s) (Verso, 1996)
- Contingency, Hegemony, Universality (with Judith Butler and Slavoj Žižek) (Verso, 2000)
- On Populist Reason. Phronesis. London: Verso Books. 2005. ISBN 9781859846513.
- The Rhetorical Foundations of Society (Verso, 2014)

== See also ==
- List of deconstructionists
