= 21st-century communist theorists =

In the 21st-century there has been a revival of serious interest in communism, led by Slavoj Žižek and Alain Badiou. This interest was propelled by the 2008 financial crisis which saw many books published offering communist and Marxist analyses of the crisis, and the 2009 conference "The Idea of Communism", that brought together many of theorists. The interest in 21st-century theorists writing about communism spans a broad range of communist traditions.

== History ==
According to the political theorist Alan Johnson, there has been a revival of serious interest in communism in the 21st century led by Slavoj Žižek and Alain Badiou.

In 2009, many advocates for and theorists of communism in the 21st century contributed to the three-day conference, "The Idea of Communism", in London that drew a substantial paying audience. Journals such as Endnotes, Salvage, Ebb Magazine Kites and Historical Materialism launched with communist outlooks, as well as news outlets such as Novara Media.

Furthermore, internet culture and declining life prospects has led to a general rise amongst Millennials and Gen-Z in support for communism and socialism, in tandem with the rise of left-populism in the US and the UK. Explicitly left-wing contemporary artists, such as filmmakers, musicians, video-game creators and comedians have received widespread attention, such as the rapper/producer JPEGMafia, and a whole media-creator ecosystem has developed around the online left, known as BreadTube.

== Contemporary communist theorists ==
- Étienne Balibar
- Bruno Bosteels
- Harry Cleaver
- Paul Cockshott
- Angela Davis
- Jodi Dean
- Costas Douzinas
- Terry Eagleton
- Mark Fisher
- Silvia Federici
- Anuradha Ghandy
- Peter Hallward
- Agon Hamza
- Michael Hardt
- Michael Heinrich
- John Holloway
- Robin Kelley
- Michael A. Lebowitz
- Andreas Malm
- China Miéville
- J. Moufawad-Paul
- Antonio Negri
- Jose Maria Sison
- Kohei Saito
- Alberto Toscano
- Erik Olin Wright
- Gianni Vattimo

Other non-Marxist thinkers who have also had an effect on the 'new communists' include the revolutionaries Subcomandante Marcos and Abdullah Öcalan, abolitionist Ruth Wilson Gilmore, economist Frédéric Lordon, architecture journalist Owen Hatherley, and the late anthropologist David Graeber.

Whilst these theorists come from a broad range of traditions, included but not limited to the Black radical tradition, Eco-socialism, Maoism, Neo-Marxism, post-Marxism, and Autonomist/Open Marxism, what they all tend to have in common is a critique of past socialist experiments, and a re-orientation of the revolutionary subject.

== Notable works ==
According to Slavoj Žižek, the book Empire by the autonomists Michael Hardt and Antonio Negri, was a major turning stone in 21st-century Marxist and communist thought.

Theoretical publications, some published by Verso Books, include The Idea of Communism, edited by Costas Douzinas and Žižek; Badiou's The Communist Hypothesis; and Bosteels's The Actuality of Communism. The defining common ground is the contention that "the crises of contemporary liberal capitalist societies—ecological degradation, financial turmoil, the loss of trust in the political class, exploding inequality—are systemic; interlinked, not amenable to legislative reform, and requiring 'revolutionary' solutions".

In the introduction to The Idea of Communism (2009), Žižek and Douzinas also identified four common premises among the thinkers in attendance:

1. The idea of communism confronts depoliticization through a return to voluntarism.
2. Communism as a radical philosophical idea. It must be thought of as taking distance from economism and statism as well as learning from the experiences of the 21st century.
3. Communism combats neoliberalism by returning to the idea of the "common".
4. Communism as freedom and equality. Equality cannot exist without freedom and vice versa.

A rise in Marxist thought followed the 2008 financial crisis, with the publishing of books including G. A. Cohen's Why Not Socialism? (2009), Paul Paolucci's Marx's Scientific Dialectics (2009), Kieran Allen's Marx and the Alternative to Capitalism (2011), Terry Eagleton's Why Marx Was Right (2011) and Vincent Mosco's Marx Is Back (2012). The Communist Horizon, published in 2012 by Jodi Dean, marked the beginning in a series of books from Dean which argue for the necessity of communist and Leninist politics. The most wide-read of these books was Mark Fisher's (2009) Capitalist Realism.

The Communist Necessity, published in 2015 by J. Moufawad-Paul, also argues for the necessity of the communist party in radical social change. Fully Automated Luxury Communism, published in 2019, has helped normalise the term 'communist' within public discourse in the anglophone world.

2023 saw the publication of two significant books on the topic of communism: Marx in the Anthropocene by Kohei Saito, which developed a notion of a degrowth communism, and Communism and Strategy by Isabelle Garo, which examines contemporary communist theorists in relation to Antonio Gramsci and Karl Marx.

== See also ==
- Autonomism
- Black radical tradition
- Chinese New Left
- Critical theory
- Critical race theory
- Communization
- History of communism § Contemporary communism (1993–present)
- Neo-Marxism
- New Communist Movement
- Prison abolition movement
- Post-Marxism
- Post-structuralism
- Postcolonialism
- Socialism of the 21st century
