= Post-Marxism =

Trend in political philosophy and social theory

Post-Marxism is a perspective in critical social theory which radically reinterprets Marxism, countering its alleged association with economism, historical determinism, anti-humanism, and class reductionism, whilst remaining committed to the construction of socialism. Most notably, post-Marxists are anti-essentialist, rejecting the primacy of class struggle, and instead focus on building radical democracy. Post-Marxism can be considered a synthesis of post-structuralist frameworks and neo-Marxist analysis, in response to the decline of the New Left after the protests of 1968. In a broader sense, post-Marxism can refer to Marxists or Marxian-adjacent theories which break with the old worker's movements and socialist states entirely, in a similar sense to post-leftism, and accept that the era of mass revolution premised on the Fordist worker is potentially over.

The term "post-Marxism" first appeared in Ernesto Laclau and Chantal Mouffe's theoretical work Hegemony and Socialist Strategy (1985). Post-Marxism is a wide category not well-defined, containing the work of Laclau and Mouffe on the one hand, and some strands of autonomism and open Marxism, post-structuralism, cultural studies, ex-Marxists and Deleuzian-inspired 'politics of difference' on the other. Recent overviews of post-Marxism are provided by Ernesto Screpanti, Göran Therborn, and Gregory Meyerson. Prominent post-Marxist journals include New Formations, Constellations, Endnotes, Crisis and Critique and Arena.

== History ==
Post-Marxism first originated in the late 1970s, and several trends and events of that period influenced its development. The weakness of the Soviet Union and Eastern Bloc paradigm became evident after the so called "secret speech" and the following invasion of Hungary, which split the radical left irreparably. Marxism from then on faced a crisis of credibility, resulting in various developments in Marxist theory, particularly neo-Marxism, which theorised against much of the Eastern Bloc. This happened concurrently with the occurrence internationally of the strikes and occupations of 1968, the rise of Maoist theory, and the proliferation of commercial television and later information technologies which covered in its broadcasts the Vietnam War.

Post-Marxism, although with its roots in this New Left and the consequent post-structural moment in France, has its real genesis in reaction to the hegemony of neoliberalism, and defeat of the Left in such events as the UK miners' strike. Ernesto Laclau argued that a Marxism for the neoliberal conjuncture required a fundamental reworking, to address the failures of both. Subsequently, Laclau and Mouffe address the proliferation of "new subject positions" by locating their analysis on a non-essentialist framework.

Simultaneously, revolutionaries in Italy, known as Operaismo, and later autonomists, began to theorise against the conservative Italian Communist Party, focusing much more on labour, gender and the later works of Marx. In France, radicals such as Félix Guattari redefined old Lacanian models of desire and subjectivity, which had often been tied to the communist project, bringing Nietzsche into conversation with Marx. In the Eastern Bloc, the Budapest School began reinterpreting Marx, building on the work of the Praxis School before them. In West Germany, theorists reinterpreted Marx's works entirely from a Hegelian dialectical perspective.

In the UK, Stuart Hall engaged with post-structuralist theorists while working for Marxism Today, especially in relation to race and identity. John Holloway began to forge a new path between Althusserian structural Marxism and instrumentalist theorists of monopoly capitalism. In the US, Michael Hardt collaborated with Antonio Negri to produce Empire at the turn of the century, widely recognised as a consolidation and re-affirmation of post-Marxism. Harry Cleaver produced innovative readings of Capital, alongside Moishe Postone who reaffirmed Marx's central concepts.

Post-Marxism also has different connotations within radical feminist theory. The way Catharine MacKinnon uses the term post-Marxism is not based on post-structuralism. She says "feminism worthy of the name absorbs and moves beyond marxist methodology", meaning that Marxism is not to be left behind but built on.

Currently, figures in the US, UK, and Europe continue to produce work in the post-Marxist tradition, particularly Nancy Fraser, Alain Badiou, Jeremy Gilbert and Étienne Balibar. This theory is often very different from that produced by Laclau and Mouffe, and much of the Left has turned against the Post-Marxist turn.

Despite being born in Latin America and the Eastern Bloc, post-Marxism is largely produced by theorists of the Global North, as the following criticisms reveal. Aside from perhaps Spivak, there are no notable theorists of the Global South who are within the post-Marxist tradition, and the radical movements of the Global South largely remain within the 'Old Left' tradition. Several reasons relating to political geography and level of academisation are given as explanations. There is some debate however as to whether Cedric Robinson was a post-Marxist.

Despite this, the Zapatistas have been a large source of inspiration for many post-Marxists.

== Criticism ==
Post-Marxism has been criticised from both the left and the right wings of Marxism. Nick Thoburn has criticised Laclau's post-Marxism (and its relationship to Eurocommunism) as essentially a rightward shift to social democracy. Ernest Mandel and Sivanandan make this same point. Richard Wolff also claims that Laclau's formulation of post-Marxism is a step backward.

Other Marxists have criticised autonomist Marxism or post-operaismo, a form of post-Marxism, of having a theoretically weak understanding of value in capitalist economies. It has also been criticised by other Marxists for being anti-humanist / anti–Hegelian dialectical.

Post-Marxism of all stripes has also been criticised for downplaying or ignoring the role of race, neocolonialism, and Eurocentrism.

Post-Marxism as a term is also seen as being too imprecise, often used as an insult or a straw man. Besides Laclau and Mouffe, very few Marxists describe themselves as post-Marxists, regardless of their own affinities with post-structuralist theories or their reinterpretation of Marx. There is also much disagreement between post-Marxists on fundamental questions of strategy and philosophy (Hegel or Spinoza, for example); some forward a left-populism, others a complete rejection of organised politics, and others a new Leninist vanguard.

== People ==
- Alain Badiou
- Étienne Balibar
- Jean Baudrillard
- Jodi Dean
- Gilles Deleuze
- Antony Easthope
- Jeremy Gilbert
- Mark Fisher
- Nancy Fraser
- Félix Guattari
- Stuart Hall
- Michael Hardt
- Agnes Heller
- John Holloway
- Fredric Jameson
- Ernesto Laclau
- Chantal Mouffe
- Nicos Mouzelis
- Antonio Negri
- Aletta Norval
- Moishe Postone
- Jacques Rancière
- Richard G. Smith
- Gayatri Chakravorty Spivak (contested)
- Nick Thoburn
- Slavoj Žižek

== See also ==
- 21st-century communist theorists
- Accelerationism
- Autonomism
- Black radical tradition
- Budapest School
- Critical legal studies
- Critical race theory
- Cultural studies
- Communization
- Eco-socialism
- Essex School of discourse analysis
- Eurocommunism
- Immaterial labor
- Marxist philosophy
- Neo-Marxism
- Neo-Gramscianism
- Open Marxism
- Postcolonialism
- Postanarchism
- Racial capitalism
- Specters of Marx
