= Walter Johnson (historian) =

American historian (born 1967)

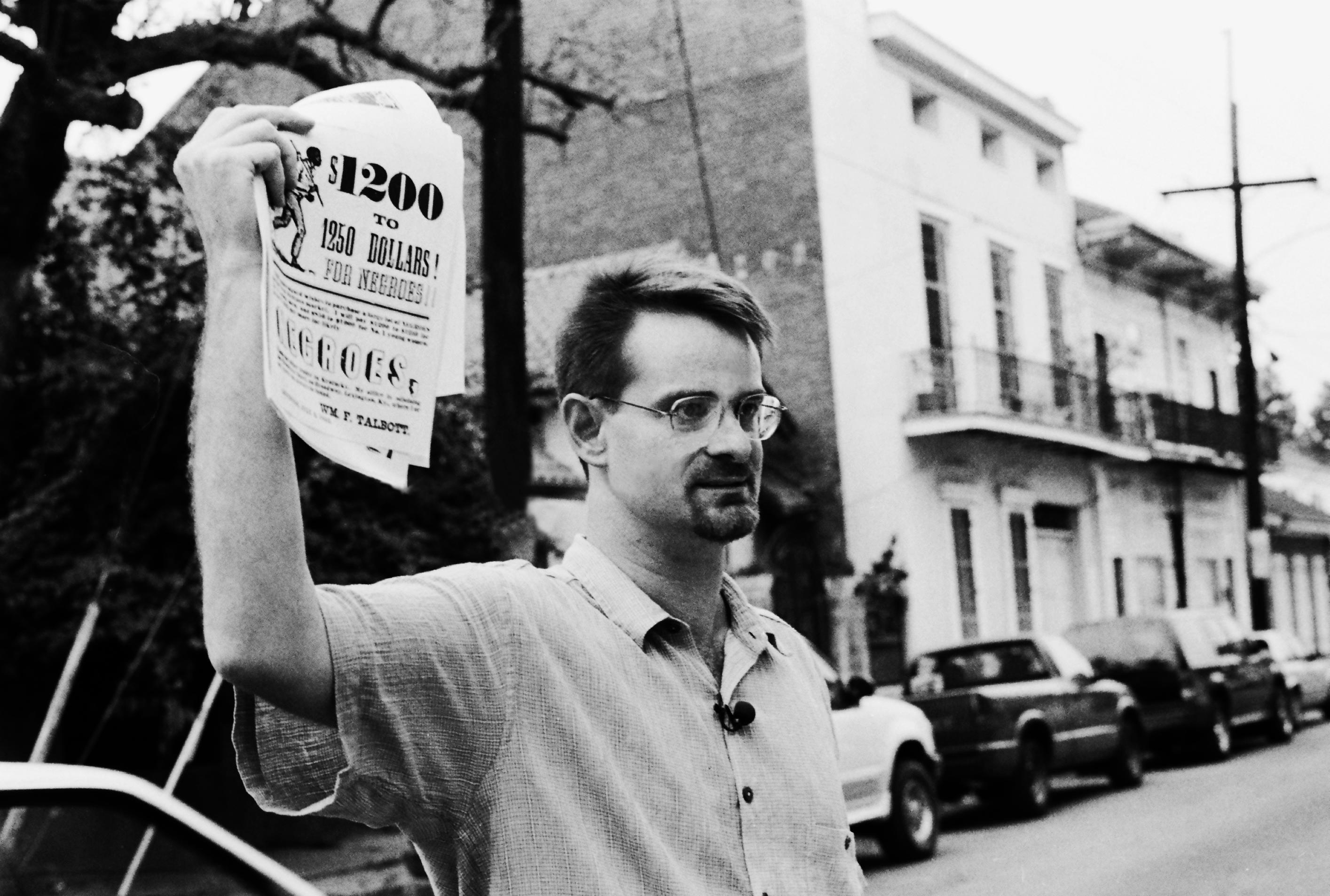
- Johnson discussing the slave trade in New Orleans, 2000.
- Born: 1967 (age 58–59); Columbia, Missouri, U.S.

Academic background
- Education: Amherst College; Princeton University

Academic work
- Discipline: History
- Institutions: New York University; Harvard University

Walter Johnson (born 1967) is an American historian who has written extensively on the U.S. slavery era and its aftermath. He is a professor of History and of African and African-American Studies at Harvard University, where he previously (2014–2020) directed the Charles Warren Center for Studies in American History.

== Life ==
Walter Johnson was born in Columbia, Missouri in 1967. His father, Walter L. Johnson, was a professor of economics at the University of Missouri. The auditorium in which he taught was later named in his honor. His mother, Mary-Angela Johnson, was director of the Children's House Montessori School, and a member of the boards of the Columbia Housing Authority and Boone County Public Library. His brother Willoughby is the author of a noted book on fly fishing.

Johnson is married to Harvard historian Alison Frank Johnson. They have five children.

== Education ==
Johnson was educated at the University of Missouri Laboratory School, West Junior High School, and Rock Bridge High School, all in Columbia, Missouri. In 2006 he was inducted into the Rock Bridge High School Hall of Fame. He holds degrees from Amherst College, the University of Cambridge, and Princeton University, where he received in 1995 a Ph.D. in History under the direction of Professor Nell Irvin Painter.

== Career ==
Johnson began his teaching career in the History Department at New York University in 1995, and taught there until 2006. In 2000, he accepted a joint appointment in NYU's American Studies program, which he directed during the academic year 2005–2006. In 2006, Johnson accepted an appointment as Professor of History and African and African American Studies at Harvard University. In 2008, he became the Winthrop Professor of History.

== Scholarship ==
Johnson's work focuses on the history of slavery, capitalism, white supremacy, Black resistance, and US imperialism.

=== Soul by Soul ===
His first book, Soul by Soul: Life Inside the Antebellum Slave Market (1999), offers an in-depth look at the U.S. slave trade. Johnson researched Louisiana Supreme Court records, slaveholders' personal records, 19th century narratives of former slaves, and the economic documentation produced by the trade itself. He developed the book over a number of years, beginning with ideas he had initially explored in a seminar on Southern History taught by Nell Irvin Painter. He enlarged the ideas and made them the subject of his 1995 Princeton Ph.D. dissertation.

Soul by Soul was one of the first works in the historiography of U.S. slavery to place the question of capitalism and the market at the heart of the investigation. By demonstrating the extent to which slaveholders' identities were embodied in their slaves, the book explores the master-slave dialectic and the relationship between slaveholding households and the slave market. By following slaves' efforts to forge human connections amidst the violent dislocation of the slave trade, Johnson provides an account of the ability of "the slave community" to reproduce itself over time and space. He explores slaveholders' gendered fantasies about the slave market, describing the questions they asked and the examinations they made in the slave market. He elucidates how racist ideas about medicine, management, and sexuality were propagated. In noting the vulnerability of slaveholders' identities, which were dependent upon slaves for their performance, he seeks to explain the extraordinary violence that characterized all of antebellum slavery.

Johnson focuses on the New Orleans slave market, and how slave traders turned humans into products for sale. He starts by chronicling the slave pens, where slaves were categorized as a means to set their monetary value. As Johnson puts it, "This daily dialectic of categorization and differentiation was the magic by which the traders turned people into things and then into money." He documents how traders prepared slaves for sale. The process would begin before the slaves reached American shores. Everything from the way they were restrained, their clothes, hygiene, and diet would get altered as necessary to make the slaves more appealing to buyers.

Johnson elaborates on the treatment of slaves once they were sold at auctions. A key area he discusses is the detailed records kept by slaveholders. The records contained notes of doctor visits, clothing, punishments, even the types of chains used to shackle the enslaved. The doctor visits were not for the benefit of slaves, but rather to help slaveholders obtain the maximum value from their purchases. Johnson cites the example of an ailing slave named Harriet, and her owner's account ledger about her. Sadly, when all efforts to cure Harriet failed, the only comfort she received was a bit of brandy, and a burial when she passed. Although she had children, they were not as valuable as she was, so they were sold immediately and received no medical care. For slaveholders, the alternative to caring for sick slaves was to sell them quickly. Account ledgers not only recorded each slave transaction, they also listed the "upgrades" done to slaves to secure their sale. Johnson suggests this constituted a form of slaveholder paternalism, and allowed the horrific institution to persist, because a slaveholder could convince himself he was "helping" the slave avoid a worse condition.

Johnson explains how an 1829 Louisiana law, which made it illegal to separate slave children under the age of ten from their mothers, complicated the efforts of slave owners to make their slaves more appealing for sale. For the traders who transported slaves over long distances, young children were a hindrance, and separating them from their mothers was seen as a benefit. So, as with many laws, slave traders found loopholes and often practiced the forbidden act of child separation in the Upper South, out of the effective reach of the law.

A slave's appearance and state of health were only some of the ways they were categorized for sale. Johnson writes, "As well as packaging the slaves into salable lots, the traders packed them into racial categories", described by words such as "Negro", "Griffe", "Mulatto", or "Quadroon". Racial categorization was a key factor in determining a slave's price. Johnson notes how during an attempted slave sale, the seller would have to answer the awkward question as to why he was selling in the first place. Buyers were suspicious about unknowingly acquiring a sick slave. Johnson points out how certain unscrupulous traders bought sick slaves on the cheap, only to sell them at premium prices.

Soul by Soul won several prizes, including the American Studies Association's John Hope Franklin Prize; the Organization of American Historians's Frederick Jackson Turner and Avery O. Craven Prizes; the Southern Historical Association's Francis B. Simkins Prize; the Society of Historians of the Early American Republic's SHEAR Book Prize; and the Thomas J. Wilson Prize from Harvard University Press. It was also a selection of the History Book Club.

=== Articles ===
In a 2003 article entitled "On Agency" in Journal of Social History, Johnson considered the historiographical and theoretical notion of "agency", which is central to a large body of scholarship in the Humanities and Social Sciences. It is not, as it is sometimes understood to be, a blanket condemnation of the writing of "history from the bottom up," but rather a call for greater attention to the terms in which history is written. "Agency", Johnson argues, has come to aggregate too many different sorts of actions under one heading, thus losing the ability to distinguish between different sorts of material contexts, cultural framings, and political purposes. "On Agency" challenged the crypto-liberal philosophical premises of progressive historiography, and called for what the historian Richard White termed a more "radical" approach to the writing of history. An updated version of "On Agency" appeared in Slavery's Ghost: The Problem of Freedom in the Age of Emancipation (2011).

Johnson's article "The Pedestal and the Veil" was published in the Journal of the Early Republic in 2004. He discusses Marx's analysis of cotton and slavery in Capital, and then issues his own critique of the orthodox separation of "slavery" and "capitalism" into two distinct stages of economic development. Johnson says that while 19th century thinkers assumed a hard-and-fast distinction between the two systems (an assumption which made its way into the work of many subsequent historians), he believes slavery and early capitalism were so deeply intertwined they should be considered as differentiated aspects of a single economic system.

=== River of Dark Dreams ===
River of Dark Dreams: Slavery and Empire in the Cotton Kingdom was published by Harvard University Press in 2013. In it, Johnson seeks to empirically substantiate some of the arguments made in his articles from the preceding decade, as well as to resituate the historiography of 19th century slavery in the history of the global economy. Where much of his earlier work had been framed around various notions of historical time, River of Dark Dreams is a book about space: the material space of the landscape of the cotton South, the economic space of the Atlantic World, and the imagined space of white supremacy and pro-slavery imperialism. River of Dark Dreams won the 2013 SHEAR Book Prize and received an Honorable Mention for the 2014 Avery O. Craven Prize from the Organization of American Historians. It was also a Choice Outstanding Academic Title for 2013.

While Johnson's work, particularly River of Dark Dreams, is often said to exemplify the "New History of Capitalism" perspective—which attributes the rise of industrial capitalism to the production of raw cotton by American slaves—Johnson himself rejects that label. Instead, he claims his indebtedness to the historiographical tradition that dates back to W. E. B. Du Bois's 1899 The Suppression of the African Slavery Trade to the United States of America, and his 1935 Black Reconstruction in America. Johnson notes Du Bois's emphasis on the ineluctably racial character of capitalism, and on the experience and historical action of working people, especially African-American working people.

Historian Philip Morgan characterized the central thesis as "dubious" and "grossly exaggerated". By contrast, historian Thavolia Glymph hailed the book as "a profoundly learned and magisterial work of synthesis and path-breaking new scholarship."

=== The Broken Heart of America ===
In a 2017 Boston Review article, Johnson invoked the models of Du Bois and Cedric Robinson in proposing that the history of slavery be reframed around the idea of "racial capitalism", which became the guiding concept of his 2020 book The Broken Heart of America: St. Louis and the Violent History of the United States. In a review of the book, Nicholas Lemann wrote that Johnson sees racism:

as a technique for exploiting black people and for fomenting the hostility of working-class whites toward blacks, so as to enable white capitalists to extract value from everyone else. For his purposes, St. Louis is a case study in the pervasiveness and the longevity of racism outside the formal boundaries of slavery.

In the 2017 BR article, Johnson lists his principal scholarly influences, including Du Bois, Cedric Robinson, Eric Williams, Nell Irvin Painter, Robin D. G. Kelley, David Roediger, George Lipsitz, Daniel Rodgers, Richard White, Lisa Lowe, Adam Green, and Stephanie Smallwood.

== Awards ==
Professor Johnson has received numerous awards and honors, including a Guggenheim Fellowship, fellowships from the American Philosophical Society, the Radcliffe Institute, and the Center for Advanced Study in the Behavioral Sciences, an ACLS-Burkhardt Fellowship, and a Mellon Fellowship in Cultural Studies at Wesleyan University.

== Works ==
- Soul by Soul: Life Inside the Antebellum Slave Market. Harvard University Press. 1999. ISBN 978-0-674-00539-6.
- Walter Johnson, ed. (2004). The Chattel Principle: Internal Slave Trades in the Americas. Yale University Press. ISBN 978-0-300-10355-7.
- River of Dark Dreams: Slavery and Empire in the Cotton Kingdom. Harvard University Press. 2013. ISBN 9780674045552. Archived from the original on March 17, 2013.
- The Broken Heart of America: St. Louis and the Violent History of the United States. Basic Books. 2020. ISBN 9780465064267.
- "State of the Field: Slavery" (2004), Organization of American Historians

=== Anthologies ===
- John Lauritz Larson; Michael A. Morrison, eds. (2005). Whither the Early Republic: A Forum on the Future of the Field. University of Pennsylvania Press. ISBN 978-0-8122-1932-6.
