= Freeze-frame shot =

Extended display of a single frame in television and film

In film and video, a freeze frame is when a single frame of content shows repeatedly on the screen—"freezing" the action. This can be done in the content itself, by printing (on film) or recording (on video) multiple copies of the same source frame. This produces a static shot that resembles a still photograph.

== Origins ==
Before it was used in film and video, the freeze frame, commonly known as the tableau (or tableaux), originated as a technique in live stage performance where actors freeze at a particular point to enhance a scene or show an important moment in production. It is considered a widely used convention in drama. Michael Fleming describes the technique as a way for performers to use their motionless bodies to illustrate a particular event or idea.

Spoken word may be used to enhance the effect of the tableau, with a narrator or one or more characters telling their personal thoughts regarding the situation. There is evidence that the technique of holding a pose was used in the commedia dell'arte tradition, in the Japanese theatre arts such as Kabuki, where it was known as mie, and in the English Renaissance theatre period, where the technique was made popular in productions of plays by William Shakespeare. Theatre historian Joseph Roach notes the tableau was used during English Renaissance theatre to emphasize the importance of a scene and even to give the audience a chance to clap.

Much later usage, such as the tableau vivant, draws upon the influence of photography and mime. In the performing arts, the technique goes by more than one name, including "tableau, photograph, sculpture, freeze frame, wax works, and statues".

== Examples ==
=== Film ===
- The first known freeze frame was in director Alfred Hitchcock's 1928 film Champagne.
- An early use of the freeze frame in classic Hollywood cinema was Frank Capra's 1946 Christmas film It's a Wonderful Life where the first appearance of the adult George Bailey (played by James Stewart) on-screen is shown as a freeze frame.
- A memorable freeze frame is the end of François Truffaut's 1959 New Wave film The 400 Blows.
- Martin Scorsese is known for using freeze frames in many of his films, such as Raging Bull (1980), Goodfellas (1990), Casino (1995), and The Wolf of Wall Street (2013).
- Satyajit Ray is known for his use of freeze-frame shots. Notable examples include the last scene of Charulata (1964) and the first scene of Jana Aranya (1975). The last scene of Charulata is critically acclaimed. Charu and her husband are about to unite and hold their hands when the screen freezes and a small gap is left in between their hands. Another film known for use of this technique is Goopy Gyne Bagha Byne where Goopy and Bagha act like a pair of statues in order to hoodwink a ferocious tiger. The same technique is also used by Ray in Mahapurush to introduce Ganesh Mama, one of the characters in the movie.
- Director George Roy Hill used the technique frequently when depicting the death of a character, as in The World According to Garp (1982) and in the memorable ending to the classic western Butch Cassidy and the Sundance Kid (1969), with Paul Newman and Robert Redford. The freeze-frame ending of The Color of Money (1986) also featured Paul Newman.
- Hong Kong director John Woo also makes extensive use of freeze-frames shots, usually to gain a better focus on a character's facial expression or emotion at a critical scene.
- This technique is used quite a lot in Peter Hedges' 2003 film Pieces of April to capture moments he feels particularly significant.
- It has also been used in the Ocean's film series directed by Steven Soderbergh at the end of the films.

=== Television ===
- The original 1965 series of Lost in Space used freeze-frame cliffhangers in its first two seasons (59 episodes).
- The 1970s American war comedy-drama television series M*A*S*H used the same "Freeze-frame cliffhanger" in original broadcasts of most episodes.
- The 1970s television series of Wonder Woman had its episodes end with a freeze-frame of Diana Prince smiling.
- The opening sequence of the Mary Tyler Moore Show ended with a freeze-frame of Moore tossing her hat in the air.
- The American TV show NCIS—a spin-off of the series JAG—often uses freeze-frame shots. In the production, they were referred to as "phoofs" or "foofs" due to the sound effect that accompanied them, which was created by NCIS's creator and executive producer Donald P. Bellisario hitting a microphone with his hand. These short black and white freeze frames depict an event that will occur later in the episode, and usually last for three seconds. The technique first appeared in the fourth episode of the second season of NCIS, "Lt. Jane Doe", and was employed in every episode since, with a typical episode containing four or five freeze frames with main characters or occasionally one-off or recurring characters.
- Freeze frames were parodied in the 1982 sitcom Police Squad!. Each episode ended — and the credits rolled over — a "freeze frame" shot emulating those of 1970s dramas. However, the scene was not actually frozen. The actors simply stood motionless in position while other activities (pouring coffee, a convict escaping, a chimpanzee throwing paper) continued around them.
- The freeze-frame cliffhanger to Part Three of the Doctor Who serial The Deadly Assassin (1976) has been described as "notorious in BBC history" and "caused such uproar when it originally aired that it had to be altered for future broadcasts".
- The American drama series Dallas was famous for its cliffhanger freeze frames, especially its end of season cliffhanger freeze frames. The most memorable being the close of "A House Divided" where JR is shot at his offices in Ewing Oil and is shown lifeless on the floor.

== See also ==
- Slow motion
