= Sheikh Aliy Hemed Abdallah al-Buhriy =

Tanzanian islamic scholar and poet

Shaykh Ali Hemed al-Buhriy
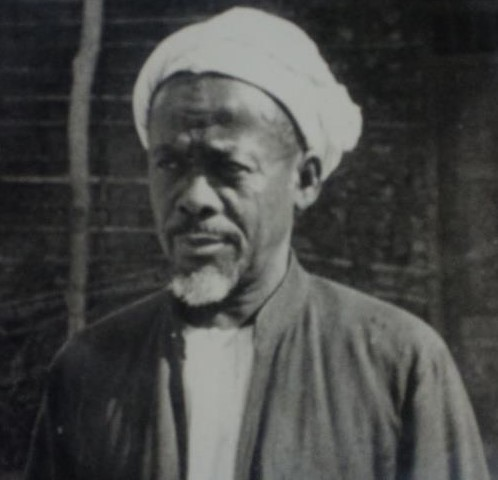
- Hemedi bin Abdallah Buhriy
- Born: 1889; Mtangata, German East Africa (now Tanga, Tanzania)
- Died: 1957 (aged 67–68)
- Occupation: Swahili muslim scholar
- Notable work: Mirathi : a handbook of the Mahomedan law of inheritance, Nikahi: a handbook of the law of marriage in Islam

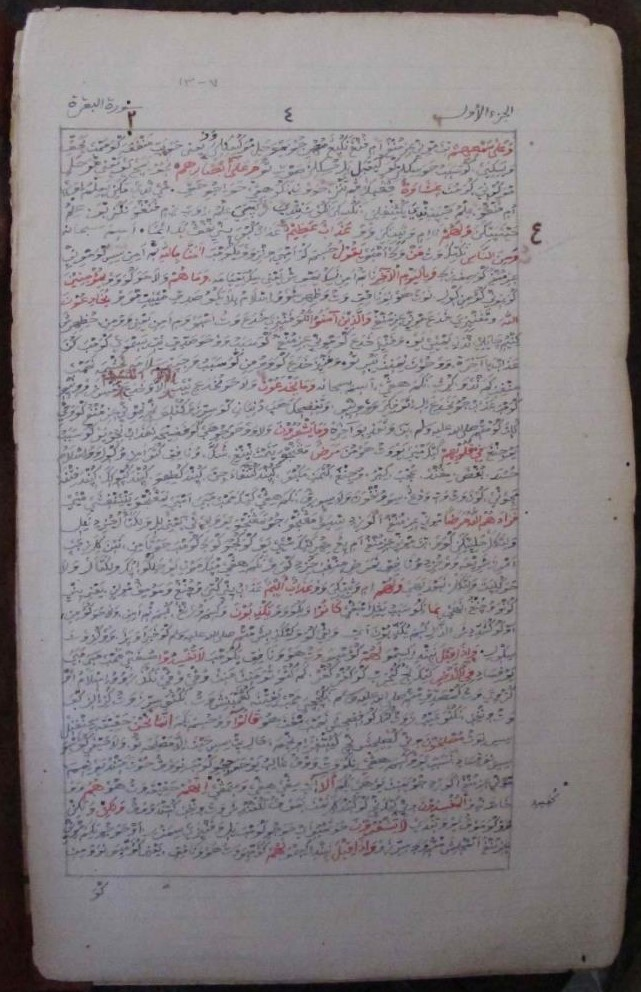
Qur’an verses with Shaykh Ali Hemed al-Buhriy's translation in Swahili-Arabic script. "This is a book with a commentary on the Holy Qurʾān in Mrima-Swahi". Before 1958.

Sheikh Aliy Hemed Abdallah al-Buhriy (Hemedi bin Abdallah Buhriy, Hemedi b. Abdallah el-Buhry, Shaykh Ali Hemed al-Buhriy, Shayk Ali Hemedi, or Shayk 'Ali ibn Humayd, 1889-1957) was a well-known East African religious muslim scholar and poet born in Tanga, Tanzania, then called Mtangata in German East Africa, and later in British Tanganyika Territory. Al-Buhriy wrote in Swahili and partly in Arabic script. As Sheikh Ali Hemed he was the last qāḍī (qadi, muslim judge) under British rule from 1921 to 1935.

== Publications ==
Al-Buhriy's publications include:

- Buhuri, Ali bin Hemedi el- (1949). Mirathi : a handbook of the Mahomedan law of inheritance. Translated by Mitchell, Philip Euen. Nairobi: Reprinted for the Government Printer by D.L. Patel Press. OCLC 173672465. Original edition 1924.
- Buhriy, Hemedi bin Abdallah (1956). Utenzi wa kutawafu Nabii [The release of the Prophet]. East African Swahili Committee (in Swahili). Arusha]: Beauchamp Printing. OCLC 22619242. 72 pages.
- Buhriy, Hemedi bin Abdallah (1959). Nikahi: a handbook of the law of marriage in Islam. Translated by Allen, J.W.T. OCLC 461571204.
- Buhriy, Hemedi bin Abdallah (1960). Utenzi wa vita vya Wadachi kutamalaki Mrima, 1307 A.H. [The German conquest of the Swahili coast, 1891 A.D.]. Johari za Kiswahili, no. 1 (in Swahili) (2nd ed.). Dar es Salaam: East African Literature Bureau. OCLC 6157696. 84 pages.

== Literature ==
- Anderson, J. N. D. (2008). Islamic law in Africa. Routledge library editions, v. 12. London: Routledge. ISBN 9780415426008. OCLC 187292404. Earlier edition 1954.
- van de Bruinhorst, Gerard C. (2024). "7. Gatekeeper, gateway, gate-opener? 75 years of ASCL collection development". In Veldkamp, Fenneken; Seuren, Germa (eds.). A window on Africa : African Studies Centre Leiden's 75th anniversary celebration. ASCL Occasional Publication. African Studies Centre Leiden, Leiden. pp. 53–59. ISBN 9789054482024. OCLC 1424874619.
- Chande, Abdin (2021). "Shaykh Ali Hemed al-Buhriy's Mrima Swahili Translation of the Qur'ān and its Place in Islamic Scholarship in East Africa" (PDF). Australian Journal of Islamic Studies. 6 (4): 111–132.
- Nimtz, August H. (1980). Islam and Politics in East Africa : the Sufi Order in Tanzania. Minneapolis: University of Minnesota Press. ISBN 9780816663835. JSTOR 10.5749. OCLC 476162151.
- Samsom, Ridder H. (2015). "The Dissolved Collection of Sheikh Aliy Hemed Abdallah al-Buhriy (1889-1957)". Islamic Africa. 6: 201-208. doi:10.1163/21540993-00602014. JSTOR 90017384. OCLC 6884854408.
- Schacht, Joseph (1965). "Notes on Islam in East Africa". Studia Islamica. 23: 91–136. JSTOR 1595256.

Sheikh Aliy Hemed’s manuscript Swahili tafsīr of the first six sūras. Qur'an commentary.
