= Neo-Marxism =

Modern politico-economic ideology

Neo-Marxism is a collection of Marxist schools of thought that originated from 20th-century approaches to amend or extend Marxism and Marxist theory, typically by incorporating elements from other intellectual traditions such as critical theory, psychoanalysis, or existentialism. Neo-Marxism comes under the broader framework of the New Left. In a sociological sense, neo-Marxism adds Max Weber's broader understanding of social inequality, such as status and power, to Marxist philosophy.

As with many uses of the prefix neo-, some theorists and groups who are designated as neo-Marxists have attempted to supplement the perceived deficiencies of orthodox Marxism or dialectical materialism. Many prominent neo-Marxists, such as Herbert Marcuse and other members of the Frankfurt School, have historically been sociologists and psychologists.

Examples of neo-Marxism include analytical Marxism, French structural Marxism, political Marxism, critical theory, cultural studies, as well as some forms of feminism. Erik Olin Wright's theory of contradictory class locations is an example of the syncretism found in neo-Marxist thought, as it incorporates Weberian sociology and critical criminology.

There is some ambiguity surrounding the difference between neo-Marxism and post-Marxism, with many thinkers being considered both. Prominent neo-Marxist journals include Spectre, Historical Materialism, New Left Review, Rethinking Marxism, Capital & Class, Salvage, Cultural Logic and the Seminar in Contemporary Marxism.

== History ==
Neo-Marxism developed as a result of social and political problems that traditional Marxist theory was unable to sufficiently address. The theory also argues that for African cinema to be called African, it must be viewed from its culture prospective and backgrounds which is totally different from the westerners .

Following World War I, some neo-Marxists dissented and later formed the Frankfurt School. The Frankfurt School never identified themselves as neo-Marxists. Toward the end of the 20th century, neo-Marxism and other Marxist theories became anathema in democratic and capitalistic Western cultures, where the term attained negative connotations during the Red Scare. For this reason, social theorists of the same ideology since that time have tended to disassociate themselves from the term neo-Marxism.

== Thinkers ==
- Theodor W. Adorno
- Louis Althusser
- Samir Amin
- Michael Apple
- Étienne Balibar
- Walter Benjamin
- Tithi Bhattacharya
- James O'Connor
- G. A. Cohen
- Robert W. Cox
- Guy Debord
- Costas Douzinas
- Paulo Freire
- Erich Fromm
- Norman Geras
- Peter Gowan
- Antonio Gramsci
- Stuart Hall
- David Harvey
- Max Horkheimer
- C. L. R. James
- Fredric Jameson
- Bob Jessop
- Henri Lefebvre
- Andreas Malm
- Herbert Marcuse
- China Miéville
- Ralph Miliband
- Erik Olin Wright
- Leo Panitch
- Adam Przeworski
- Nicos Poulantzas
- Moishe Postone
- Jean-Paul Sartre
- Nick Srnicek
- Paul Sweezy
- Immanuel Wallerstein
- Raymond Williams
- Ellen Meiksins Wood

== Neo-Marxist feminism ==
Some portions of Marxist feminism have used the neo-Marxist label. This school of thought believes that the means of knowledge, culture, and pedagogy are part of a privileged epistemology. Neo-Marxist feminism relies heavily on critical theory and seeks to apply those theories in psychotherapy as the means of political and cultural change. Teresa McDowell and Rhea Almeida use these theories in a therapy method called "liberation based healing.".

== Neo-Marxian economics ==
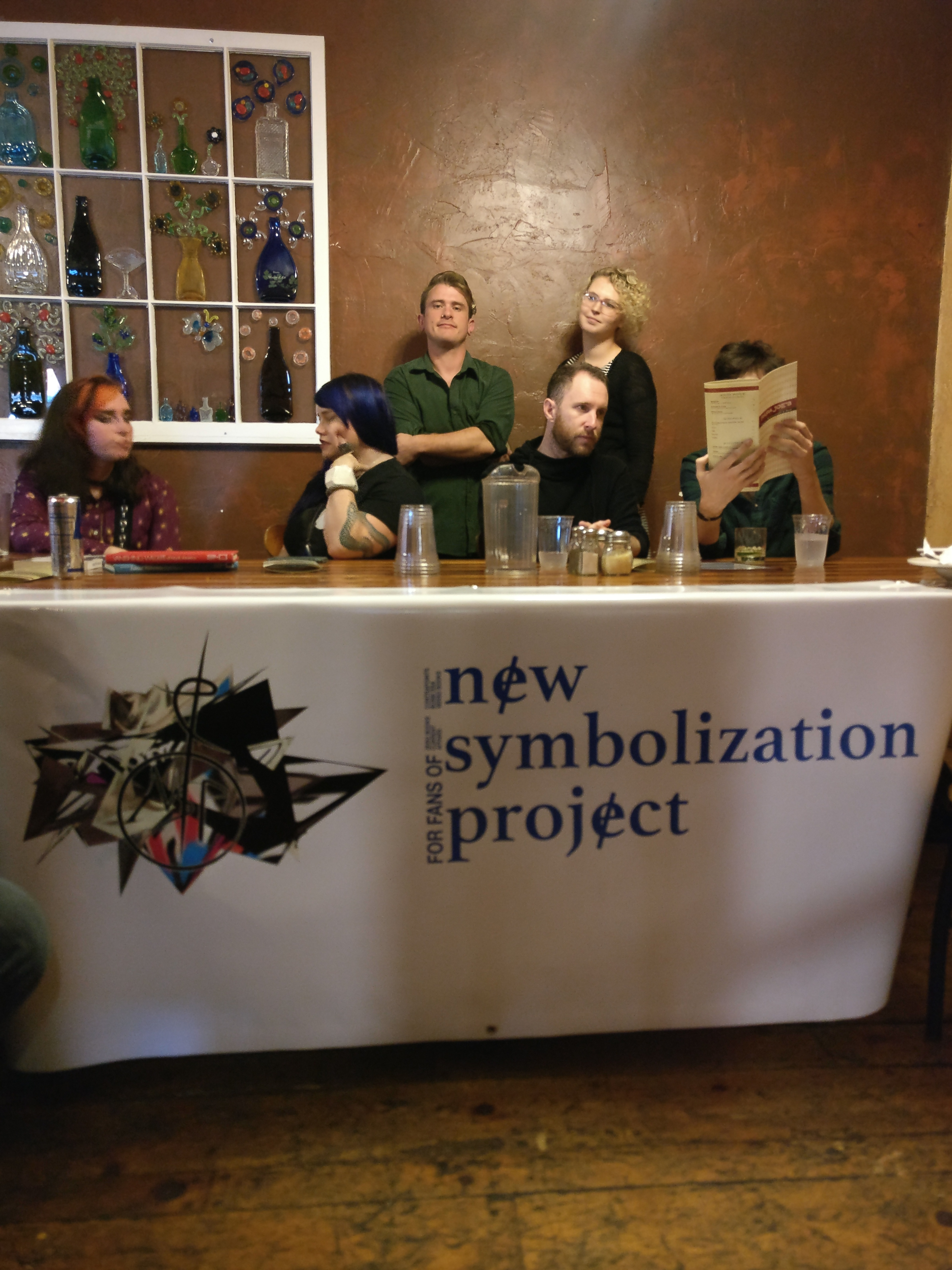
New Symbolization Project, a critical theory club at Boise State University, held the first sustained, multi-disciplinary academic response to the Jordan Peterson phenomenon in late October 2018; notable Marxist economist Richard D. Wolff and radical theologian Peter Rollins gave the keynotes.

The terms "neo-Marxian", "post-Marxian", and "radical political economics" were first used to refer to a distinct tradition of economic theory in the 1970s and 1980s that stems from Marxian economic thought. Many of the leading figures were associated with the leftist Monthly Review School. The neo-Marxist approach to development economics is connected with dependency and world systems theories. In these cases, the 'exploitation' that classifies it as Marxist is an external one, rather than the normal 'internal' exploitation of classical Marxism.

In industrial economics, the neo-Marxian approach stresses the monopolistic and oligarchical rather than the competitive nature of capitalism. This approach is associated with Michał Kalecki, Paul A. Baran, and Paul Sweezy.

As in the case of Analytical Marxism, Such theorists as Samuel Bowles, David Gordon, John Roemer, Herbert Gintis, Jon Elster, and Adam Przeworski have adopted the techniques of neoclassical economics, including game theory and mathematical modeling, to demonstrate Marxian concepts such as exploitation and class conflict.

The neo-Marxian approach integrated non-Marxist or "bourgeois" economics from the post-Keynesians like Joan Robinson and the neo-Ricardian school of Piero Sraffa. Polish economists Michał Kalecki, Rosa Luxemburg, Henryk Grossman, Adam Przeworski, and Oskar Lange were influential in this school, particularly in developing theories of underconsumption. While most official communist parties denounced neo-Marxian theories as "bourgeois economics", some neo-Marxians served as advisers to socialist or Third World developing governments. Neo-marxist theories were also influential in the study of Imperialism.

=== Concepts ===
Big business can maintain selling prices at high levels while still competing to cut costs, advertise and market their products. However, competition is generally limited with a few large capital formations sharing various markets, with the exception of a few actual monopolies (such as the Bell System at the time). The economic surpluses that result cannot be absorbed through consumers spending more. The concentration of the surplus in the hands of the business elite must therefore be geared towards imperialistic and militaristic government tendencies, which is the easiest and surest way to utilise surplus productive capacity.

Exploitation focuses on low wage workers and groups at home, especially minorities. Average earners see the pressures in drive for production destroy their human relationships, leading to wider alienation and hostility. The whole system is largely irrational since though individuals may make rational decisions, the ultimate systemic goals are not. The system continues to function so long as Keynesian full employment policies are pursued, but there is the continued threat to stability from less-developed countries throwing off the restraints of neo-colonial domination.

==== Labor theory of value ====
Paul A. Baran introduced the concept of potential economic surplus to deal with novel complexities raised by the dominance of monopoly capital, in particular the theoretical prediction that monopoly capitalism would be associated with low capacity utilization, and hence potential surplus would typically be much larger than the realized surplus. With Paul Sweezy, Baran elaborated the importance of this innovation, its consistency with Marx's labor concept of value and supplementary relation to Marx's category of surplus value.

According to Baran's categories:

- Actual economic surplus: "the difference between what society's actual current output and its actual current consumption." Hence, it is equal to current savings or accumulation.
- Potential economic surplus: "the difference between that output that could be produced in a given natural and technical environment with the help of employable productive resources, and what might be regarded as essential consumption".

Baran also introduced the concept of planned surplus—a category that could only be operationalized in a rationally planned socialist society. This was defined as "the difference between society's 'optimum' output available in a historically given natural and technological environment under conditions of planned 'optimal' utilization of all available productive resources, and some chosen 'optimal' volume of consumption."

Baran used the surplus concept to analyze underdeveloped economies (or what are now more optimistically called "developing economies") in his Political Economy of Growth.

== Academic journals ==
- Spectre
- Historical Materialism
- Rethinking Marxism
- Capital & Class
- Salvage
- Cultural Logic
- Seminar in Contemporary Marxism
- Radical Philosophy

== See also ==
- 21st-century communist theorists
- Analytical Marxism
- Budapest School
- Cultural Marxism conspiracy theory
- Democratic socialism
- Marxian economics
- Marxist cultural analysis
- Marxist feminism
- Marxist humanism
- Open Marxism
- Post-Marxism
- Socialism of the 21st century
- Western Marxism
- Young Marx
