= August Nimtz =

American political scientist

August H. Nimtz
- Born: 1942 (age 83–84)

Academic background
- Education: Purdue University (BA); Indiana University (PhD)

Academic work
- Discipline: Political science
- Sub-discipline: Marxism; Comparative politics Revolutionary movements African politics African American politics
- Institutions: University of Minnesota
- Notable works: Marx and Engels: Their Contribution to the Democratic Breakthrough (2000); The Ballot, the Streets or Both (2019) "Black Marxism": A Marxist Critique (2026)

August H. Nimtz (born 1942) is an American political scientist. He is a professor of political science and of African American and African studies at the University of Minnesota.

His first book, Islam and Politics in East Africa (1980), based on fieldwork in the Tanzanian town of Bagamoyo, focused on the political role of its Sufi brotherhoods. Since 2000 Nimtz has written mainly about Karl Marx, Friedrich Engels and Vladimir Lenin. His books include Marx and Engels: Their Contribution to the Democratic Breakthrough (2000), a two-volume study of Lenin's electoral strategy (2014), a comparison of Marx and Frederick Douglass written with Kyle A. Edwards (2024), and a reply to Cedric Robinson's Black Marxism (2026).

== Early life and career ==
Born in 1942 to a New Orleans family, Nimtz grew up under Jim Crow laws, attending schools that were segregated by law. He took a Bachelor of Arts at Purdue University in 1963 and a Ph.D. in political science at Indiana University in 1973. His doctoral research was based on fieldwork in the Tanzanian coastal town of Bagamoyo, where he lived in 1969 and 1970 and later visited. His first book was a shortened and revised version of the thesis.

Nimtz has taught at the University of Minnesota since 1971. He is a professor of political science and of African American and African studies there. In 2002 he received the Horace T. Morse-University of Minnesota Alumni Association Award for Outstanding Contributions to Undergraduate Education.

Nimtz was a member of the Socialist Workers Party (SWP) from 1972 to 1995. He co-chaired the Minnesota Committee on Southern Africa from 1976 to 1978 and the Twin Cities chapter of the National Black Independent Political Party from 1981 to 1983. He twice ran for office for the SWP: for mayor of Minneapolis in 1985, and the next year as running mate to Tom Jaax, its candidate for governor of Minnesota.

== Works ==
Nimtz's first book came out of his doctoral fieldwork and was about Islam and politics in Tanzania. His later books are about Marx, Engels and Lenin, and several of them are about race and slavery in the United States.

=== Islam and politics in East Africa ===
Nimtz's first book Islam and Politics in East Africa: The Sufi Order in Tanzania came out in 1980. It examines the political role of the tariqa, or Sufi brotherhood, in East Africa under German and British colonial rule and through independence. Nimtz argues that the reason the brotherhoods grew was because they gave leadership roles to African Muslims, which they could not get within mainstream Islam. The book ends with thirteen propositions meant to apply beyond East Africa. Norman R. Bennett reviewed the book in the American Historical Review and called it a major contribution that went well beyond earlier guesswork about the brotherhoods. Ibrahim Abu-Lughod called the book an important study in the American Political Science Review and C. C. Stewart wrote that the book opened a debate that had not been possible before in East Africa.

Bennet and Stewart felt the thirteen propositions at the end of the book were weak. Bennett wrote that they were commonsense conclusions from evidence and the latter called several of the propositions circular. Abu-Lughod wrote that the book stopped at the independence struggle and did not cover what happened to the brotherhoods afterwards. Marguerite Ylvisaker reviewed the book in the International Journal of African Historical Studies and wrote that she doubted Nimtz's claim that the split between "black" and "white" was the basic division in Swahili society. She also added that women's membership got only a brief mention.

=== Marx scholarship ===
Marx and Engels: Their Contribution to the Democratic Breakthrough was published in 2000. It argues that Marx and Engels were leading figures in the democratic movement of the nineteenth century and that what they went through in the revolutions of 1848 and 1849 shaped their later ideas. The book follows their work in the Communist League, the revolutions themselves as well as Engels's work after Marx died. It includes a chapter that compares Marx with Alexis de Tocqueville. Paul Le Blanc reviewed the book in Monthly Review and wrote that it works both as a guide to the Marx/Engels Collected Works and as a political biography. Reviewing the book in Science & Society Mehmet Tabak called it a full account of their party work. Bradley J. Macdonald reviewed the book in Perspectives on Politics and credited Nimtz with putting their ideas back into the working-class struggles of the time.

Tabak, Le Blanc and Macdonald all thought that Nimtz claimed more than his evidence supported. Tabak said working-class organisation came before Marx and Engels and was developed largely independently of them. Le Blanc objected to the book's definition of the working class and also disagreed with what it says about the dictatorship of the proletariat. Macdonald said Nimtz had mistaken what Marx and Engels meant to do for what they actually achieved. He further wrote that his case against the "Marxologists" only works if books such as the Economic and Philosophic Manuscripts of 1844 and Capital are left out.

Marx, Tocqueville, and Race in America: The 'Absolute Democracy' or 'Defiled Republic' (2003) grows out of the comparison in the earlier book. The book compares Tocqueville's writings on the United States with Marx's on slavery and the Civil War. In a survey of Marx scholarship in English, Paul Blackledge described the book as an expansion of one chapter of Marx and Engels, and summed up its argument as being that Marx and Engels understood the American democracy of their day better than Tocqueville because they saw how much slavery and racism mattered. Richard Boyd, in Perspectives on Politics, praised the chapters on Marx and Engels. He called them detailed, and wrote that Nimtz recounts Marx's support for the Union cause with grace and passion. Boyd was much harder on the treatment of Tocqueville, which he called a straw man. In his opinion Nimtz attacks Tocqueville for views he did not hold. He also wrote that Democracy in America is treated as though it were only concerned with political institutions. He further objected that Nimtz applies a double standard on race, excusing Marx's racial insults while calling Tocqueville's views straightforwardly racist.

Nimtz wrote The Communist and the Revolutionary Liberal in the Second American Revolution: Comparing Karl Marx and Frederick Douglass in Real-Time (2024) with Kyle A. Edwards. The book traces Douglass from Garrisonian abolitionism to what the authors call revolutionary liberalism, and Marx from radical democracy to communism. It argues that the two converged during the Civil War and then diverged again. Jason Dawsey wrote a review of the book in Against the Current. He singled out the attention the book gives to Marx's journalism in the New York Daily Tribune and Die Presse, which he thought a useful corrective to recent scholarship's focus on the Grundrisse and Capital. Dawsey disliked the authors' talk of a "mind-meld" between the two men. He also wanted more on what was happening elsewhere in the world at the time.

"Black Marxism": A Marxist Critique (2026) is a reply to Cedric Robinson's Black Marxism: The Making of the Black Radical Tradition (1983). It gathers work Nimtz published over four decades, along with autobiographical writing and new essays. The centrepiece is his 1984 review of Robinson in the Journal of African Marxists, one of the first responses to that book. A 2002 essay answers the charge that Marx was Eurocentric. The volume closes with a new essay, "Revisiting Black Marxism Four Decades Later". Reviewing the book in Cosmonaut, Gary Levi called it the strongest available answer to charges about Marx's views on race. However, he wrote that Nimtz's strengths as a political historian do not carry over into the account of the years since the 1970s. He also found the claim that the United States is less racist and more tolerant than ever to be one-sided. Seth Sandronsky reviewed it in CounterPunch. For him the core of the book was its reading of what Marx and Engels wrote about the divisions between English and Irish workers, and between black and white workers in the United States.

=== Lenin scholarship ===
Lenin's Electoral Strategy from Marx and Engels through the Revolution of 1905 and Lenin's Electoral Strategy from 1907 to the October Revolution of 1917 appeared in 2014. Both are subtitled The Ballot, the Streets or Both, and both deal with Lenin's leadership of the Bolshevik wing of the Russian Social Democratic Labour Party in the four Russian state Dumas. According to Nimtz Lenin used elections and parliaments for revolutionary ends more than anyone else, and that he took his lead from Marx and Engels. He describes Lenin's position as revolutionary parliamentarism: standing in elections while rejecting what Engels called parliamentary cretinism, the belief that winning seats could replace struggle outside parliament.

William W. Sokoloff, writing in New Political Science, called the books politically relevant. Bradley J. Macdonald in Perspectives on Politics contrasted the two volumes favorably against the stereotypical image of Lenin as a Jacobin, a believer in willpower and a hero of the anti-liberal crowd. Derrick Morrison, in Against the Current, called the books handbooks for anti-austerity activists. Sokoloff and Macdonald each had reservations. Sokoloff found Nimtz needlessly harsh towards other scholars. He also said Nimtz identifies too closely with Lenin so that the resulting Lenin is never wrong. Macdonald thought there was too much quotation of Lenin and also found the case for Lenin's present-day relevance weak. Todd Chretien said Nimtz was too absolute in tracing the split in the Second International mainly to disagreements about elections.

=== Other works ===
In Marxism versus Liberalism: Comparative Real-Time Political Analysis (2019) Nimtz applies a method he calls comparative real-time political analysis. It compares rival figures against each other over the same events, and asks three questions of each: what they wrote, what their actions achieved as those events unfolded, and how accurately they read them. The book pairs Marx and Engels with Tocqueville on the French side of the European Spring, Marx with John Stuart Mill on the American Civil War, Lenin with Max Weber on the Russian Revolution of 1905, and Lenin with Woodrow Wilson on 1917 and the end of the First World War. Matthew E. Strauss reviewed it in New Politics. The method, he thought, worked best in the comparison chapters and credited Nimtz with being open about its limits. He pointed out that Nimtz treats Domenico Losurdo's Liberalism: A Counter-History as an opponent when the two books complement each other.

Nimtz has also authored articles in academic journals. He wrote an article in Science & Society in 2015 on the first clash between Marxism and anarchism. He argued that the popular account, which traces the split to the debates of the First International, exaggerates their importance of those debates. He wrote that Marx and Engels never publicly confronted Mikhail Bakunin on what divided them. There was a symposium on the article the following year.

== Selected publications ==
- Nimtz, August H. (1980). Islam and Politics in East Africa: The Sufi Order in Tanzania. Minneapolis: University of Minnesota Press. ISBN 978-0-8166-0963-5.
- Nimtz, August H. (2000). Marx and Engels: Their Contribution to the Democratic Breakthrough. Albany, NY: State University of New York Press. ISBN 978-0-7914-4489-4.
- Nimtz, August H. (2003). Marx, Tocqueville, and Race in America: The "Absolute Democracy" or "Defiled Republic". Lanham, Md.: Lexington Books. ISBN 978-0-7391-0677-8.
- Nimtz, August H. (2014). Lenin's Electoral Strategy from Marx and Engels through the Revolution of 1905: The Ballot, the Streets or Both (First ed.). New York: Palgrave Macmillan. ISBN 978-1-137-39377-7.
- Nimtz, August H. (2014). Lenin's Electoral Strategy from 1907 to the October Revolution of 1917: The Ballot, the Streets or Both (First ed.). New York: Palgrave Macmillan. ISBN 978-1-137-39378-4.
- Nimtz, August H. (2019). The Ballot, the Streets or Both: From Marx and Engels to Lenin and the October Revolution. Chicago: Haymarket Books. ISBN 978-1-64259-035-7.
- Nimtz, August H. (2019). Marxism versus Liberalism: Comparative Real-Time Political Analysis. Cham, Switzerland: Palgrave Macmillan. ISBN 978-3-030-24945-8.
- Nimtz, August H.; Edwards, Kyle A. (2024). The Communist and the Revolutionary Liberal in the Second American Revolution: Comparing Karl Marx and Frederick Douglass in Real-Time. Historical Materialism Book Series. Vol. 326. Leiden: Brill. ISBN 978-90-04-70637-8.
- Nimtz, August H. (2026). "Black Marxism": A Marxist Critique. New York: Monthly Review Press. ISBN 978-1-68590-173-8.
