= Lena Hill =

American academic administrator

- Born: Lena Michelle Hill; 1974 (age 51–52)

Academic background
- Education: Howard University; Yale University
- Doctoral advisor: Vera Kutzinski; Joseph Roach

Academic work
- Discipline: African American literature
- Institutions: University of Iowa; Washington and Lee University

Lena Michelle Hill (born 1974) is an American academic administrator serving as the provost of Washington and Lee University since 2021. She has worked as a professor of English and Africana studies and is an expert on Ralph Ellison.

== Life ==
Hill was born to Carl and Gloria Moore. She earned a B.A. in English, summa cum laude, from Howard University in 1997. During her undergraduate studies, she attended Williams College in 1995 and Richmond College in Florence in 1996. She completed a Ph.D. in English from Yale University in 2005. Her dissertation was titled, Frames of Consciousness: Visual Culture in Zora Neale Hurston, Tennessee Williams, and Ralph Ellison. Vera Kutzinski and Joseph Roach were Hill's dissertation directors. She was a postdoctoral fellow from 2004 to 2006 at Duke University.

Hill's scholarship focuses on African American literature and she is an expert on Ralph Ellison. In 2006, she joined the University of Iowa as an assistant professor of English and African American studies. Hill and her husband, Michael D. Hill, co-authored a reference guide on Ellison and co-edited a book about African Americans at the University of Iowa. She was promoted to associate professor with tenure in 2013 and served as director of undergraduate studies from 2015 to 2016. She was senior associate to the president from 2016 to 2018 an interim chief diversity officer and associate vice president from July 2017 to May 25, 2018. She was succeeded by interim diversity officer Melissa Shivers. Hill joined Washington and Lee University on July 1, 2018, as a professor of English and Africana studies and dean of the college of arts and sciences. In 2020, she served on the steering committee of the Gettysburg College Consortium for Faculty Diversity. Washington and Lee University joined the consortium that year. She was promoted to provost on July 1, 2021. Hill succeeded interim provost Elizabeth Oliver.

== Selected works ==
- Hill, Michael D.; Hill, Lena M. (2008). Ralph Ellison's Invisible Man: A Reference Guide. Bloomsbury Academic. ISBN 978-0-313-33465-8.
- Hill, Lena (2014). Visualizing Blackness and the Creation of the African American Literary Tradition. Cambridge University Press. ISBN 978-1-107-04158-5.
- Hill, Lena M.; Hill, Michael D., eds. (2016). Invisible Hawkeyes: African Americans at the University of Iowa During the Long Civil Rights Era. University of Iowa Press. ISBN 978-1-60938-441-8.
