= Black radical tradition =

Philosophical and political ideology

The Black radical tradition is a philosophical tradition and political ideology with roots in 20th century North America. It is a "collection of cultural, intellectual, action-oriented labor aimed at disrupting social, political, economic, and cultural norms originating in anti-colonial and antislavery efforts." It was first popularised by Cedric Robinson's book Black Marxism.

Influential concepts from the Black radical tradition include abolition, racial capitalism, and intersectionality. The Black radical tradition is closely related to anti-colonial, decolonial thought and Marxist third worldism.

Prominent figures and movements associated with the Black radical tradition include W. E. B. Du Bois, Malcolm X, the Black Panther Party, Angela Davis, the Nation of Islam, the civil rights movement, Black feminism, Négritude, Afrocentrism, Black liberation theology, the Black Consciousness and Black Power movements; contemporary movements like Black Lives Matter have also been included in the tradition. A prominent Black Radical journal is Race & Class.

== Thinkers ==
- Herbert Aptheker
- Ella Baker
- Amiri Baraka
- Christina Sharpe
- Gargi Bhattacharyya
- Steve Biko
- Amílcar Cabral
- Aimé Césaire
- Oliver Cox
- Basil Davidson
- Angela Davis
- Aria Dean
- Frederick Douglass
- W. E. B. Du Bois
- Frantz Fanon
- Marcus Garvey
- Ruth Wilson Gilmore
- Paul Gilroy
- Lewis Gordon
- Stuart Hall
- Fred Hampton
- Harry Haywood
- Gerald Horne
- George Jackson
- Mumia Abu Jamal
- C. L. R. James
- Claudia Jones
- Robin Kelley
- Audre Lorde
- Katherine McKittrick
- Achille Mbembe
- Mao Zedong
- Fred Moten
- John Narayan
- Huey P. Newton
- Kwame Nkrumah
- Luke De Noronha.
- George Padmore
- Mário Pinto de Andrade
- Geronimo Pratt
- A Philip Randolph
- Cedric Robinson
- Walter Rodney
- Assata Shakur
- Ambalavaner Sivanandan
- Barbara Smith
- Ahmed Sékou Touré
- Tumi Mogorosi
- Kwame Ture
- Cornel West
- Eric Williams
- Robert F. Williams
- Sylvia Wynter
- Malcolm X

== See also ==
- African-American leftism
- African-American socialism
- Afro-Caribbean leftism
- Autonomism
- Black anarchism
- Critical race theory
- Combahee River Collective
- Neo-Marxism
- Post-Marxism
- Postcolonialism
- Prison abolition movement
