= Vera Kutzinski =

American academic and researcher (born 1956)

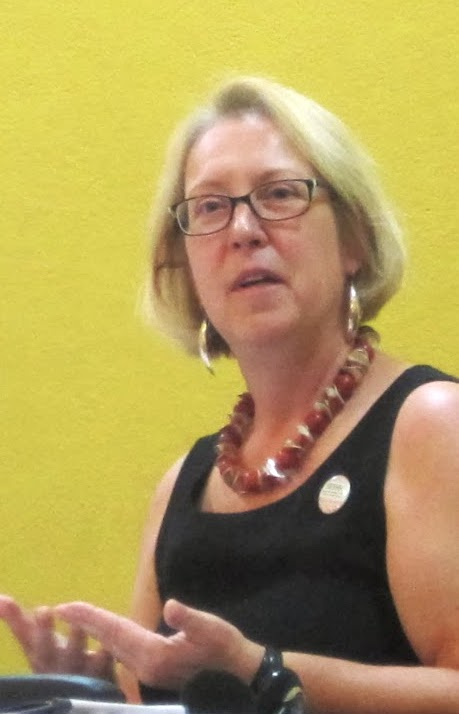
- Born: Vera M. Kutzinski; 1956 (age 69–70); Cuxhaven, West Germany
- Occupation: Academic
- Awards: Alexander Bouchet Prize for Excellence in Afro-American Studies; Theron Rockwell Field Prize; Gustave Arlt Award in the Humanities

Academic background
- Education: Smith College; Yale University

Academic work
- Discipline: American studies
- Institutions: Vanderbilt University
- Doctoral students: Peter Hallward; Lena Hill

Vera M. Kutzinski (born 1956) is an American academic, born in Cuxhaven. Since 2004, she has been the Martha Rivers Ingram Professor of English and Professor of Comparative Literature at Vanderbilt University. Kutzinski also directs the Alexander von Humboldt in English (HiE) project, a collaboration between Vanderbilt and the Institute of Romance Languages and Literatures at the University of Potsdam, Germany.

Kutzinski’s work focuses on African American and Afro-Diasporic literatures in hemispheric and transatlantic contexts; on translation and translation studies; and on the history of knowledge production. Her books include Against the American Grain: Myth and History in William Carlos Williams, Jay Wright, and Nicolás Guillén, Sugar's Secrets: Race and the Erotics of Cuban Nationalism, and The Worlds of Langston Hughes: Modernism and Translation in the Americas. Langston Hughes in Context, an essay collection Kutzinski co-edited with Anthony Reed, was published by Cambridge University Press in 2022.

== Education ==
Kutzinski studied American literature at the University of Hamburg in Germany (1975–78) before moving to the US in 1978 and completing a one-year Diploma in American Studies from Smith College the following year. At Yale University (1979–85), she earned master's degrees in Afro-American and American Studies in 1981 and 1982, respectively, and a Ph.D. in American Studies in 1985.

== Career ==
From 1985 to 1986, Kutzinski taught at University of Maryland, Baltimore as an Assistant Professor of English before joining the Yale English Department at the same rank. In 1991, she taught as a Visiting Associate Professor of English and New World Studies at the University of Virginia, Charlottesville. The following year, she was promoted at Yale to Associate Professor and became a tenured Professor of English, African American Studies, and American Studies in 1994. In 2004, Kutzinski was recruited by Vanderbilt University as the first Martha Rivers Ingram Professor of English and the director of the Center for the Americas.

At Vanderbilt University, Kutzinski founded the Alexander von Humboldt in English project in 2007 and, together with Ottmar Ette, launched the Alexander von Humboldt in English series at the University of Chicago Press.

== Research ==
=== Literatures of the Americas ===
Kutzinski's work is grounded in Critical race theory and Afro-Diasporic literary studies. The Daily Daily (1989), her English-language version of Cuban poet Nicolás Guillén’s El Diario que diario, was the first of her many translations. Among other things, the concept and practice of "New World writing" she analyzed in writings by the work of Puerto Rican-American modernist William Carlos Williams, African American poet Jay Wright, and Cuban poet-activist Guillén led to the New World Studies series at the University Press at Virginia, which published Sugar’s Secret as the series’ inaugural volume. In The World of Langston Hughes, Kutzinski continues the work she began in Afro-Hispanic Literature, her contribution to the Cambridge History of Latin American Literature in 1996, by focusing on Hughes’s contact with Latin American writers and the Spanish-language versions of his writings that circulated in Latin America. Rachel Farebrother praised the book for its "rigorous archival research", its "comprehensive inventory of translations of Hughes’s writings into Spanish", and a "truly internationalist scope that never underestimates the importance of specific historical and linguistic contexts."

In addition to editing the section on Anglophone Caribbean Literature in A History of Literature in the Caribbean (2001) and contributing an essay on Caribbean Literary Criticism to The Johns Hopkins Guide to Literary Theory and Criticism, Kutzinski has also published articles on Caribbean writers other than Guillen, notably Wilson Harris, Gabriel García Márquez, Erna Brodber, Dany Bébel-Gisler, Shani Mootoo, Plácido (Gabriel de la Concepcion Valdés) and Fernando Ortiz.

=== Atlantic studies and research on Alexander von Humboldt ===
With Writing-between-Worlds: TransArea Studies and the Literatures without a Fixed Abode, her translation of a monograph by Ottmar Ette, Kutzinski, broadened the scope of her previous transnational work on the Americas. This shift toward Atlantic Studies is also reflected in her essay on Langston Hughes’s poems in the post-World War II Germanies.

Kutzinski’s work on the Prussian scientific traveler Alexander von Humboldt’s writings on the Americas is another part of her turn toward transatlantic contexts. Together with Ette and a team of translators and scholars, the HiE project has published three critical editions of Humboldt’s writings: the Political Essay on the Island of Cuba (2011), Views of the Cordilleras and the Monuments of the Indigenous Peoples of the New Continent (2012), and the Political Essay on the Kingdom of New Spain (2019). In addition, Kutzinski translated The Complete Drawings from the American Travel Diaries in 2018. The international Alexander von Humboldt Conference Kutzinski organized at Vanderbilt in 2009 produced the essay collection Alexander von Humboldt and the Americas (2012). That same year, a special issue Kutzinski edited for Atlantic Studies became the collection Alexander von Humboldt’s Transatlantic Personae.

== Awards and honors ==
- 1981 - Alexander Bouchet Prize for Excellence in Afro-American Studies, Yale
- 1985 - Theron Rockwell Field Prize (for dissertation)
- 1987 - Gustave Arlt Award in the Humanities for Against the American Grain, National Council of Graduate Schools
- 1988 - Mellon Fellowship
- 1992 - Ford Foundation Faculty Research Grant
- 2008 - Gerda Henkel Foundation Grant,
- 2009 - Alexander von Humboldt Foundation TransCoop Grant
- 2010 - NEH Grant for HiE project

== Bibliography ==
=== Scholarly books and translations ===
- Against the American Grain: Myth and History in William Carlos Williams, Jay Wright, and Nicolás Guillén (1987) ISBN 9780801833304
- Sugar's Secrets: Race and the Erotics of Cuban Nationalism (1993) ISBN 9780813914671
- The Worlds of Langston Hughes: Modernism and Translation in the Americas (2012) ISBN 9780801466243
- Writing-between-Worlds. TransArea Studies and the Literatures-without-a-fixed-Abode by Ottmar Ette (2016) ISBN 9783110462876
- Alexander von Humboldt: The Complete Drawings from the American Travel Diaries. Ed. Mayer and Ottmar Ette (2018). ISBN 9783791383545
- Langston Hughes in Context. Ed. Kutzinski and Anthony Reed. (2022). ISBN 9781009057783

=== Select articles and book chapters ===
- "The Logic of Wings: Gabriel García Márquez and Afro American Literature." Latin American Literary Review 13 (1985): 133 146.
- "Changing Permanences: Historical and Literary Revisionism in Robert Hayden's 'Middle Passage." Callaloo 9 (1986): 171-83.
- "Unseasonal Flowers: Nature and History in Plácido and Jean Toomer." Yale Journal of Criticism 3:2 (Spring 1990): 153-179.
- "Borders and Bodies: America, the United States, and the Caribbean." New Centennial Review 1.2 (2001): 53-86.
- "Wilson Harris’s Phantom Bodies. Re-reading the Subject." Theatre of the Arts. Wilson Harris and the Caribbean. Ed. Hena Maes-Jelinek and Benedicte Ledent. Amsterdam & New York: Rodopi, 2002: 139-151.
- "Caribbean Literary History and its Sexual Others." Caribbean Interfaces. Ed. Lieven D’hulst, Jean-Marc Moura, Liesbeth De Bleeker and Nadia Lie. Amsterdam: Rodopi, 2007: 35-45.
- "Literature as Knowledge for Living, Literary Scholarship as Science for Living" by Ottmar Ette. Translated and edited, with an Introduction (A Survival Kit for the Humanities?). PMLA 125.4 (2010): 977-993.
