= Peter Hallward =

Canadian philosopher

- Born: Peter Marsham Hallward; 29 April 1968 (age 58)

Education
- Education: Oxford University (BA); Yale University (PhD)
- Thesis: Writing in the Singular Immediate: Gilles Deleuze, Edouard Glissant, Nathalie Sarraute, Charles Johnson, Mohammed Dib, Severo Sarduy (1997)
- Doctoral advisor: Vera Kutzinski; Christopher L. Miller

Philosophical work
- Era: Contemporary philosophy
- Region: Western philosophy
- School: Continental philosophy
- Institutions: King's College London (1999–2004); Middlesex University (2005–2010); Kingston University (2010–)
- Main interests: Political philosophy, 20th-century French philosophy, critical theory, postcolonialism, existentialism, political will

Peter Marsham Hallward (born 29 April 1968) is a Canadian political philosopher, best known for his work on Alain Badiou and Gilles Deleuze. He has also published works on post-colonialism and contemporary Haiti. Hallward is a member of the editorial collective of the journal Radical Philosophy and a contributing editor to Angelaki: Journal of the Theoretical Humanities.

After completing his PhD at Yale University in French and African-American studies under the supervision of Christopher L. Miller and Vera Kutzinski in 1997, Hallward became a lecturer, and then reader, of French philosophy and literature at King's College London from 1999 to 2004. In 2005, he joined the Centre for Research in Modern European Philosophy, which relocated from Middlesex University to Kingston University in 2010. He is now a professor of Modern European Philosophy at Kingston University.

== Work ==
In 2016, Hallward was working on a three-part project on the key philosophers of political will: Jean-Jacques Rousseau, Louis Auguste Blanqui, and Karl Marx. He is simultaneously working on a larger book entitled 'The Will of the People,' which will "develop and defend a notion of democratic political will, understood as a rational, deliberate, and autonomous capacity for collective self-determination."

== Bibliography ==
=== Books ===
- Hallward, Peter (2001), Absolutely Postcolonial: Writing Between the Singular and the Specific, Manchester: Manchester University Press, ISBN 0-7190-6126-1.
- Hallward, Peter (2003), Badiou: A Subject to Truth, Minneapolis: University of Minnesota Press, ISBN 0-8166-3461-0.
- Hallward, Peter (2006), Out of this World: Deleuze and the Philosophy of Creation, London: Verso Books, ISBN 1-84467-555-6.
- Hallward, Peter (2007), Damming the Flood: Haiti, Aristide, and the Politics of Containment, London: Verso Books, ISBN 978-1-84467-106-9.

=== Edited volumes ===
- Hallward, Peter, ed. (2004), "Think Again: Alain Badiou and the Future of Philosophy", Continuum, London, ISBN 0-8264-5907-2.
- Hallward, Peter, and Knox Peden, eds. (2012) Concept and Form, vol. 1: Selections from the Cahiers pour l'Analyse. London: Verso, ISBN 1-84467-872-5.
- Hallward, Peter, and Knox Peden, eds. (2012) Concept and Form, vol. 2: Interviews and essays on the Cahiers pour l'Analyse. London: Verso, ISBN 1-84467-873-3.
- Hallward, Peter, and Philippe Le Goff, eds. (2018) The Blanqui Reader: Political Writings, 1830–1880 London: Verso, ISBN 9781786635013.

=== Journal articles and book chapters ===
- Hallward, Peter (August 2003). "The One or the Other?". Angelaki. 8 (2).
- Hallward, Peter (May–June 2004). "Option Zero in Haiti". New Left Review. II (27).
- Hallward, Peter (22 February 2007). "An Interview with Jean-Bertrand Aristide". London Review of Books. 29 (4).
- Hallward, Peter (2010), "'Communism of the Intellect, Communism of the Will'", in Douzinas, Costas; Žižek, Slavoj (eds.), The Idea of Communism, London: Verso, pp. 111–130
- Hallward, Peter (2011), "The Will of the People: Dialectical Voluntarism and the Subject of Politics", in Elliott, Jane; Attridge, Derek (eds.), Theory after 'Theory', London: Routledge, pp. 90–104
- Hallward, Peter (2017). "Concentration or Representation: The Struggle for Popular Sovereignty". Cogent Arts & Humanities. 4 (4): 1–16. doi:10.1080/23311983.2017.1390916.
- Hallward, Peter (2022). "The Will of the People and the Struggle for Mass Sovereignty: A Preliminary Outline" (PDF). Crisis & Critique. 9 (2): 142–219.
- Hallward, Peter (2023), "'The Most Absolute Authority': Rousseau and the Tensions of Popular Sovereignty", in Harris, Neal; Bosseau, Denis; Pintobtang, Ployjai; Brown, Owen (eds.), Rousseau Today: Interdisciplinary Essays, Political Philosophy and Public Purpose, Cham: Springer, pp. 43–82, doi:10.1007/978-3-031-29243-9_3, ISBN 978-3-031-29242-2

=== Translations ===
- Badiou, Alain (2001), Ethics: An Essay on the Understanding of Evil, London: Verso Books, ISBN 1-85984-297-6.
