= Antony Easthope =

British literary scholar (1939–1999)

Antony Easthope (14 April 1939 – 14 December 1999) was a British scholar, writer, and literary controversialist.

Easthope was educated at Tiffin School and Christ's College, Cambridge, where he was taught English by Graham Hough. He spent most of his career at Manchester Metropolitan University. He taught also at Brown University, the University of Warwick, Wolfson College, Oxford, the University of Adelaide, and the University of Virginia. In addition to scholarly and popular books on literary theory, film theory, Marxism, and psychoanalysis, Easthope was known for his letters to newspapers, particularly The Guardian, often attacking prominent literary figures. Even the most prominent were not spared from his scorn; in one of his Guardian letters, Easthope declared that "[Seamus] Heaney's Nobel Prize only confirms the stagnancy of mainstream British culture."

== Major works ==
- Poetry as Discourse. London: Methuen, 1983.
- British Post-Structuralism. London: Routledge, 1988.
- Poetry and Phantasy. Cambridge: Cambridge University Press, 1989.
- What a Man's Gotta Do: The Masculine Myth in Popular Culture. Boston: Unwin Hyman, 1990.
- Literary Into Cultural Studies. London: Routledge, 1991.
- Paradigm Lost and Paradigm Regained. London: Routledge, 1993.
- Wordsworth Now and Then: Romanticism and Contemporary Culture. Buckingham: Open University Press, 1993.
- The Impact of Radical Theory on Britain in the 1970s. London: Routledge, 1994.
- Donald Davie and the Failure of Englishness. Albany: SUNY Press, 1996.
- Derrida and British Film Theory. St. Martin's, 1996.
- But What Is Cultural Studies? London: Routledge, 1997.
- Cinecities in the Sixties. London: Routledge, 1997.
- Classic Film Theory and Semiotics. Oxford: Oxford University Press, 1998.
- The Pleasures of Labour: Marxist Aesthetics in a Post-Marxist World. Edinburgh: University of Edinburgh Press, 1999.
- Englishness and National Culture. London: Routledge, 1999.
- Paradise Lost: Ideology, Phantasy and Contradiction. New York: St. Martin's, 1999.
- Postmodernism and Critical and Cultural Theory. New York: Routledge, 1999.
- The Unconscious. London: Routledge, 1999.
- Freud's Spectres. Manchester: Manchester University Press, 2000.

== See also ==
- British left
- Post-Marxism
