= Black Marxism =

Book written by Cedric Robinson

- Author: Cedric Robinson
- Language: English
- Publisher: Zed Books
- Publication date: 1983

Black Marxism: The Making of the Black Radical Tradition, first published in 1983, again in 2000 and a third edition in 2020, is a book written by the scholar Cedric Robinson. Influenced by many African-American and Black economists and radical thinkers of the 19th century, Robinson creates a historical-critical analysis of Marxism and the Eurocentric tradition from which it evolved. The primary theories outlined in Black Marxism are racial capitalism and the Black radical tradition.

== Synopsis ==
Black Marxism is separated into three parts, the first being, “The Emergence and Limitations of European Radicalism;” the second, “The Roots of Black Radicalism;” and the third, “Black Radicalism and Marxist Theory.” This can be read as a dialectical triad, thesis-antithesis-synthesis, demonstrating Robinson's effort to use a type of dialectical and historical materialist critique of earlier trends and strands of Marxian theory. The text combines notions from Western Marxist writers like Lukacs, in particular the theory of reification as applied to racialism and racism as related to capitalist relations within the Triangle Trade, with insights offered by Foucauldian insights and standpoint epistemology.

Through these sections, Robinson critiques Marxism and its reliance on determinism.

The book begins by introducing the theory of racial capitalism, the process of deriving social and economic value from the racial identity of another person predicated upon reification of a set of human phenotype features, Blackness, as a marker for commodification within the matrix of slavery. Robinson develops this term to correct what he thinks led Karl Marx and Friedrich Engels to mistakenly believe that European bourgeois society would rationalize social relations. Robinson says that as a material force… racialism would inevitably permeate the social structures emergent from capitalism. He used the term ‘racial capitalism’ to refer ... to the subsequent structure as a historical agency. He argues that all capitalism is structured by ‘racialism’ and produces inequalities among groups. Thus, all capitalism should be recognized as racial capitalism.

In addition, Black Marxism aims to elucidate the Black radical tradition of the past, present, and future. Robinson recounts several acts of resistance, from seventeenth-century maroon communities in the Americas to twentieth-century national liberation struggles, discussing W. E. B. Du Bois, Richard Wright, and C. L. R. James as exemplifying the tradition.

== Publication ==
Black Marxism was first published in 1983 by Zed Books. It was republished in 2000 by the University of North Carolina Press, with an introduction provided by Robin D. G. Kelley. Black Marxism’s second edition received both praise and criticism from within the American political left. A third edition was published in 2020, again by University of North Carolina Press with a new preface by Damien Sojoyner and Tiffany Willoughby-Herard and a new foreword by Robin D. G. Kelley.

== Legacy ==
Several writers have demonstrated and written about Black Marxism's relevance for 21st-century issues.

The Black Lives Matter (BLM) movement grounds its structural analysis of Black oppression in racial capitalism. Specifically, the organization Movement for Black Lives (M4BL) names racial capitalism in its 2020 policy platform, "A Vision for Black Lives". Scholars find it noteworthy that BLM continues to reach back to Black Marxism, suggesting that the book's theories have great significance for black radical movements of the past and present. Moreover, contemporary radical scholars champion Black Marxism for the extent to which it argues the link between contemporary anti-Black violence and historical structures of oppression.

The publication of Black Marxism has directed the agenda of Africana studies, as well as influenced the definition of radicalism in Black scholarship. The Black radical tradition provides a rich resource for future challenges of Africana studies and it acts as a bridge, helping academics to “understand the conceptual vocabulary used by ... activist-intellectuals who research and teach about the relationship between race and class … [and] to identify the concepts needed to transform the conditions under which the radical tradition now operates."
