= Isabelle Garo =

French philosopher

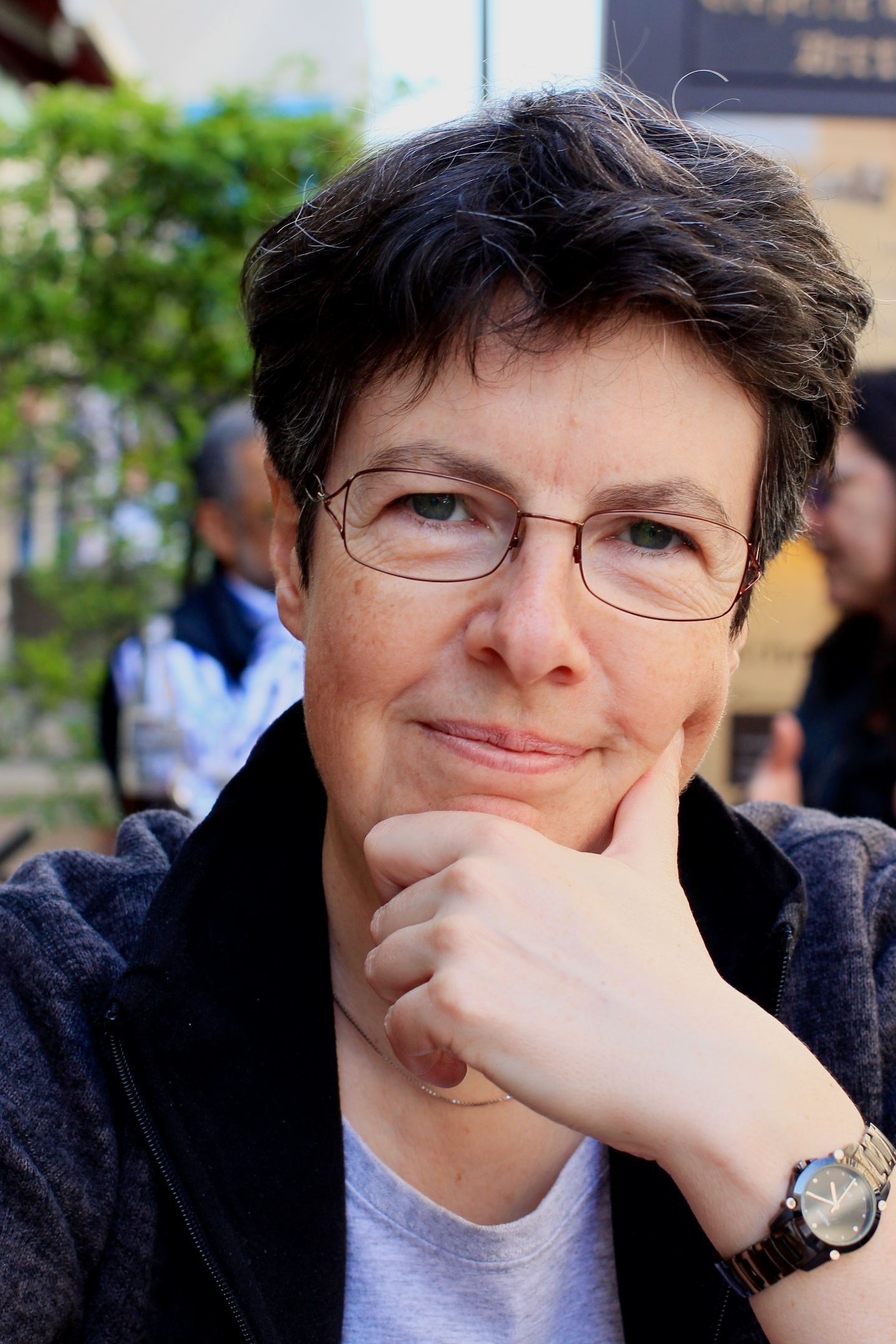
- Born: 5 September 1963 (age 63); Saint-Germain-en-Laye, France
- Occupation: Philosopher

Isabelle Garo (born 5 September 1963) is a French philosopher specialising in the works of Karl Marx.

== Biography ==
Garo's research focuses on the works of Karl Marx and Friedrich Engels, put in their context and broached from both theoretical and political angles. Her work has affected the critical reception of Marx, especially in France, since the 1970s. At the same time, her books analyse the Marxist tradition within the scope of contemporary capitalism and its crisis.

She is president of the Grande Édition Marx et Engels (GEME), a project working on the first complete edition of the writings of Marx and Engels in the French language.

In 2012, she announced her support of the Left Front and its candidate, Jean-Luc Mélenchon. In November 2015, she signed the "Appeal of the 58": "We will protest during the state of emergency". Since 2018, she has been a member of the Council of Orientation of the Foundation Copernic.

== Books ==
- Marx, une critique de la philosophie (in French), Seuil (Points Essais), Paris, 2000
- L'île, légendes définitives (in French), Le Bruit des Autres, Limoges, 2001 (Poetry)
- L'idéologie ou la pensée embarquée (in French), La Fabrique, Paris, 2009
- Foucault, Deleuze, Althusser & Marx - La politique dans la philosophie (in French), Démopolis, Paris, 2011
- Consignes pour un communisme du XXIe siècle (in French), La Ville brûle, Montreuil, 2011 (Poetry and object-book)
- Marx et l'invention historique (in French), Syllepse, Paris, 2012
- L'or des images : art, monnaie, capital (in French), La Dispute, Paris, 2015
- Communisme et stratégie (in French), Amsterdam, Paris, 2019
- Avec Marx, philosophie et politique (in French), interviews directed by Alexis Cukier and Isabelle Garo with Alain Badiou, Etienne Balibar, Jacques Bidet, Michael Löwy and Lucien Sève, La Dispute, Paris, 2019
