= Racial capitalism =

Post-Marxist social and economic concept

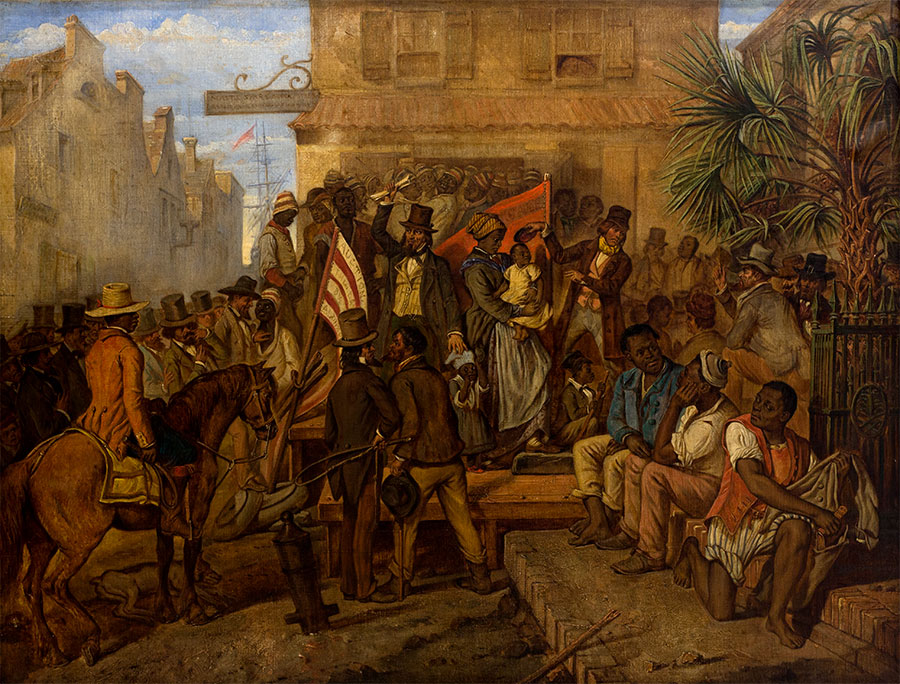
Eyre Crowe, A Slave Sale in Charleston, South Carolina, 1854

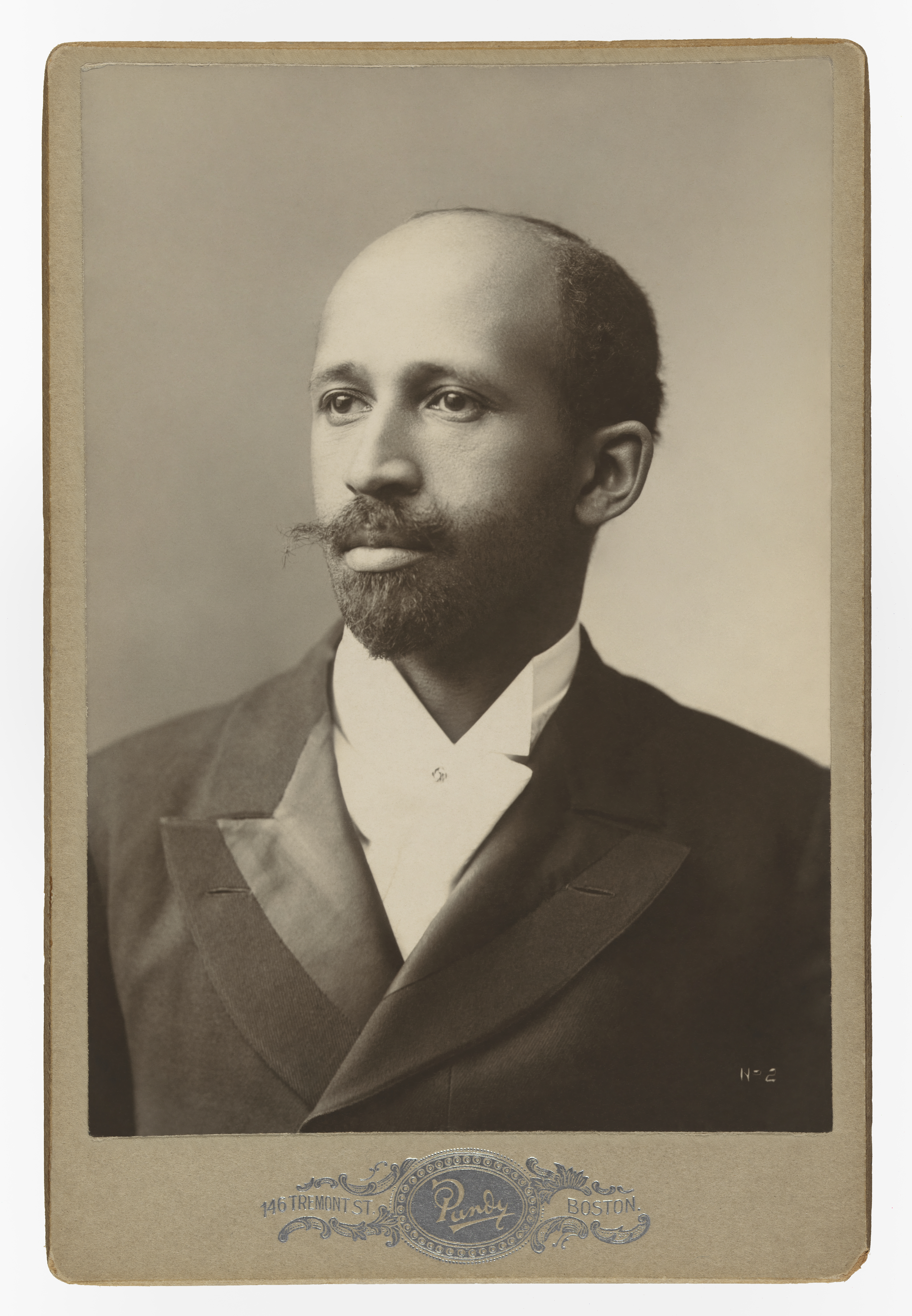
W.E.B. Du Bois by James E. Purdy, 1907

Racial capitalism is a concept that explains how capital accumulation under capitalism is achieved through the extraction of social and economic value from people with marginalized racial identities. Some view it as a reframing of the history of capitalism in the United States, especially in relation to black people and the legacy of chattel slavery.

== Term origin ==
The concept behind the term "racial capitalism" was popularized by Cedric J. Robinson in his book Black Marxism: The Making of the Black Radical Tradition, published in 1983, which, in contrast to both his predecessors and successors, theorized that all capitalism is inherently racial capitalism, and racialism is present in all layers of capitalism's socioeconomic stratification. Jodi Melamed has summarized the concept, explaining that capitalism "can only accumulate by producing and moving through relations of severe inequality among human groups", and therefore, for capitalism to survive, it must exploit and prey upon the "unequal differentiation of human value". He also argues that the ideologies of democracy, nationalism, and multiculturalism are key to racial capitalism.

Before Robinson, earlier scholars and theorists such as W. E. B. Du Bois, C. L. R. James and Eric Williams had extensively documented how industrial capitalism was built on the foundation of colonialism and slavery, and they also made departures from the Eurocentrism of Marxism. Furthermore, Black radicals in American sociology such as Du Bois, St. Claire Drake, Horace Cayton, and Oliver Cromwell Cox established a foundation for academic research on the intersection of racism and capitalism.

Robinson's articulations of racial capitalism became central to the field of Black and diasporic African studies, wherein new connections were drawn between capitalism, racial identity, and the development of the disconnected social consciousness—that is, the discontinuity of interhuman relations—in the 20th century. In Robinson's own words: "the development, organization, and expansion of capitalist society pursued essentially racial directions," and "it could be expected that racialism would inevitably permeate the social structures emergent from capitalism." Building upon earlier examinations of racial discrimination in and inherent to various political ideologies and societal structures, Robinson challenged the Marxist notion of capitalism's negation of the basic discriminatory tenets of European feudalism, namely, its rigid caste system and reliance upon multi-generational serfdom. Hence, rather than considering capitalism as revolutionary and radically liberating, as, say, Michael Novak did, Robinson argued the inverse: that capitalism did not liberate those in racially oppressive positions, nor did it abolish feudalism's discriminatory practices; instead, capitalism gave rise to a new world order, one that extended—not deconstructed—such discriminatory practices, (Note: A similar sentiment is expressed in Karl Marx's Manifesto of the Communist Party, when he writes: "The modern bourgeois society that has sprouted from the ruins of feudal society has not done away with class antagonisms. It has but established new classes, new conditions of oppression, new forms of struggle in place of the old ones.") and one that developed and became intertwined with various forms of racial oppression: "slavery, violence, imperialism, and genocide."

Although racial capitalism is not limited to European territories or those previously under Europe's colonial or imperial rule, it was during Western Europe's 17th-century economic and intellectual flourishing that capitalism and racial exploitation were first linked. Racial capitalism, according to Robinson, therefore emanated from the "tendency of European civilization...not to homogenize [groups of peoples] but to differentiate"—differentiation which led to racial hierarchization and, consequently, exploitation, expropriation, and expatriation.

In modern academic literature, racial capitalism has been discussed in the context of political and social issues such as environmental justice, South African apartheid, the Israeli–Palestinian conflict (also known as the ongoing genocide in Palestine), and the disparities in contraction rates that occurred during the COVID-19 pandemic. From this, racial capitalism can be seen to impact a variety of different historical and current events around the world.

== History ==
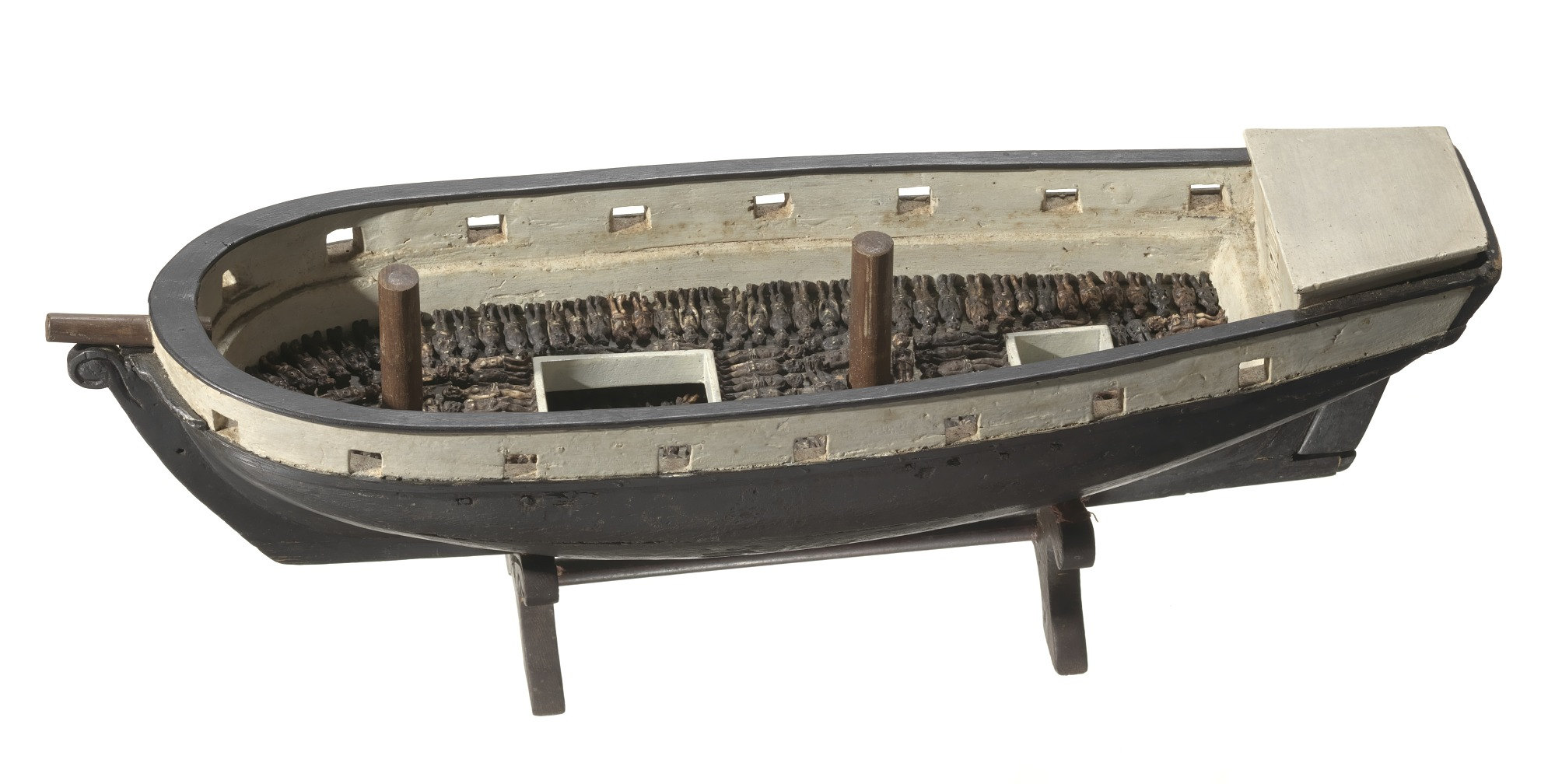
This folk art model of a slave ship was made by an unknown artist in the first half of the 20th century and is on display at the National Museum of African American History & Culture.

Beginning in the early modern period and reaching its apogee during the New Imperialism era, "racism formed an indispensable weapon in the armoury of the state elites, used to contain the class struggles waged by subaltern populations with a view to making the system safe for capital accumulation."

European colonialism was in large part driven by the gradual collapse of feudalism, the decline of which was hastened by events such as the Black Death, famines, and wars in as early as the 14th century. Such decline created a crisis of capital accumulation, which resulted in class struggles undermining the feudal system, and many elites gradually looked to colonization as a way to maintain their wealth and power. The fusion of race and capitalism first materialized in the modern epoch with the advent of the Atlantic slave trade in the late 17th century. Though slavery existed for thousands of years prior to Europe's colonization of the Americas and the subsequent transatlantic slave trade (for example, slavery was widespread in ancient Greece and Rome), racism and its convergence with capital, as it is understood today, emerged concurrently with European colonialism and slavery in the 17th century. The transatlantic voyages of Northern European explorers to the New World, unlike the conquests of Spanish colonizers, which yielded significant deposits of gold, silver, and other valuable metals, were subsidized primarily through agricultural plantations. In 1619, a group of enslaved Africans was brought to Virginia, coinciding with the establishment of tobacco farming as a major component of the colonial Virginian economy. However, cash crop agriculture in European colonies was serviced chiefly by white indentured servants in its inception, and it was not until the second half of the 17th century that servitude was gradually supplanted by slavery in Europe's American colonies. Indentured servants in the Americas, mostly indebted or imprisoned Europeans, worked under a plantation owner for a set period of time, usually for four to seven years, before they obtained the status of a 'free man'. As plantations grew in number, workloads surged, and indentured servitude terms expired, white American colonists searched for more sustainable means of economical, unrestricted employment to meet growing demand and ever-increasing profit quotas.

In 1661, the Barbados Slave Code was signed into law by the colonial legislature, serving as a basis for other slave codes throughout the Americas. On paper, the legislation protected both the slave and the enslaver from heinous cruelty, however, in effect, only the latter party received lawful security. Enslavers were provided with various methods to keep the enslaved subjugated, and by law were proffered legal intervention if slaves pursued retaliation or a collective insurrection, whereas the latter was excluded from pursuing legal recourse in the case of being a victim of cruelty or maltreatment. However, during this period, free people of color were present in several European colonies, some of which even enjoyed state-protected freedom. In one account, the Chesapeake Bay was described as having a multiracial character in the early to mid 1600's.

In the aftermath of Bacon's Rebellion in 1676, during which a multiracial coalition of European indentured servants and African slaves joined forces in an ultimately unsuccessful revolt against Virginian governor Sir William Berkeley, racial stratification emerged to prevent future mixed-race alliances in the colony. By privileging European servants and stipulating that all African slaves brought into Virginia were considered chattel, the colonial authorities created a system to separate out different races within the laboring population, using color as a sorting mechanism. By the 1680's, the categories of "white" and "Black" had emerged, supplanting previous distinctions of nationality or religion.

Atlantic World slavery developed the racialized conception of property in several ways, especially in the United States. One such way was through classifying people in the property scheme. Specifically, property ownership was dependent on race, and only white men maintained the right to own property—property which included white and non-white men alike. Whiteness, for the property-owning subset of white men, therefore, enabled ownership of property along with insulation from the threat of becoming property oneself. Under the yoke of chattel slavery, and subject to its brutal practices, slaves, and by extension men and women of color more broadly, were dehumanized, i.e. reduced to subhuman status.

During the Victorian era, waves of migration to Western Europe and North America occurred, typically from groups fleeing persecution or famine at home (such as Irish Catholics escaping the Great Famine and Jewish immigrants fleeing from Russian pogroms). Once they arrived, these immigrants were frequently racialized as foreign "others" and forced into squalid working conditions as part of the rapidly expanding urban proletariat. However, through a process of cultural assimilation, such immigrant groups were eventually considered by wider society as "white", granting them social mobility in the capitalist system denied to other marginalized groups.

== Modern racial capitalism ==
Racial capitalism has been theorized by academic scholars to be at the core of many issues involving racial inequality, including environmental justice issues, the disproportionate impacts of COVID-19, as well as South African apartheid and the Israeli–Palestinian conflict. Recent work has also extended analyses of racial capitalism to data and capital generated through digital applications and platforms.

In an article for the socialist Monthly Review, Charisse Burden-Stelly, Assistant Professor of Africana Studies and Political Science at Carleton College in Minnesota, theorized modern U.S. racial capitalism as, "a racially hierarchical political economy constituting war and militarism, imperialist accumulation, expropriation by domination, and labor superexploitation." She further argued that racial capitalism is rooted in the intersection of anti-Blackness and anti-radicalism. Burden-Stelly described Anti-Blackness as reducing Blackness to "a category of abjection and subjection" through means such as claims of "absolute biological or cultural difference, ruling-class monopolization of political power, negative and derogatory mass media propaganda, [and] the ascent of discriminatory legislation..." She defined anti-radicalism as the "repression and condemnation of anticapitalist and/or left-leaning ideas, politics, practices, and modes of organizing that are construed as subversive, seditious, and otherwise threatening to capitalist society. These include, but are not limited to, internationalism, anti-imperialism, anticolonialism, peace activism, and antisexism". Burden-Stelly used the work of Trinidadian-born sociologist Oliver Cromwell Cox to argue that "[m]odern US racial capitalism arose in the context of the First World War, when, as Cox explains, the United States took advantage of the conflict to capture the markets of South America, Asia, and Africa for its 'over-expanded capacity.'" In the context of the First Red Scare, Burden-Stelly noted that a 1919 U.S. Justice Department report named Radicalism and Sedition Among the Negroes, As Reflected in Their Publications condemned Blacks' "'ill-governed reaction toward race rioting,' 'threat of retaliatory measures in connection with lynching,' open demand for social equality, identification with the Industrial Workers of the World, and 'outspoken advocacy of the Bolshevik or Soviet doctrine.'" Burden-Stelly situated the critique of racial capitalism as developed by Cedric Robinson within an early- and mid-20th-century tradition of Black radical critique whose major practitioners included, among others, W. E. B. Du Bois, James W. Ford, the Sojourners for Truth and Justice, Esther Cooper Jackson, Walter Rodney, and James Boggs.

=== Environmental justice ===
Environmental justice scholars in the United States have argued in modern literature that systems of racial capitalism and settler colonialism allow for environmental injustices to occur today. More specifically, environmental racism is a specific form of environmental injustice that "frequently includes the implementation of policies, regulations, or institutional practices that target communities of color for undesirable waste sites, zoning, and industry." According to environmental justice scholars and activists, examples of environmental racism practiced by the United States federal and state governments include the prison system, where people of color and undocumented persons are the majority of inmates and detainees who suffer disproportionate health risks and harms, and toxic exposures such as the Flint water crisis.

Environmental justice scholars such as Laura Pulido, Department Head of Ethnic Studies and Professor at the University of Oregon, and David Pellow, Dehlsen and Department Chair of Environmental Studies and Director of the Global Environmental Justice Project at the University of California, Santa Barbara, argue that recognizing environmental racism as an element stemming from the entrenched legacies of racial capitalism is crucial to the movement, with white supremacy continuing to shape human relationships with nature and labor.

Pulido argues for the reframing of the environmental justice movement by conceptualizing environmental racism as a product of racial capitalism. She outlines three main points: the centrality of the production of social difference in creating value, the incorporation of the devaluation of nonwhite bodies into economic processes, and the state's active sanctioning of racial violence in the form of death and degraded bodies and environments. In a specific example, Pulido contends that racial capitalism is at the core of the Flint water crisis: "the people of Flint are so devalued that their lives are subordinated to the goals of municipal fiscal solvency...this devaluation is based on both their blackness and their surplus status, with the two being mutually constituted."

In his work, Pellow describes how the pervasive legacies of European colonization of Native American land in the United States continue to shape the experiences that American Indian and Alaska Native people and other minority communities have with their environments. He asserts that deep-rooted racial hierarchies underlie the American legal system and allow for the widespread environmental racism that these communities have faced over centuries. Pellow cites a study by the Center for Justice, Tolerance, and Community at the University of California, Santa Cruz, which reveals the disproportionate exposures to industrial toxic releases, cancer risks, and respiratory hazards from pollution experienced by communities of color and low-income residents in the San Francisco Bay Area. The study's authors suggest that understanding power dynamics is crucial in analyzing patterns of environmental racism; according to this perspective, areas where communities of color and low-income residents are unable to resist and affect regional politics are where environmental hazards end up.

=== COVID-19 disparities ===
According to Whitney N. Laster Pirtle, racial capitalism is a fundamental cause of disease in the world. This is especially seen in the COVID-19 pandemic. Racial disparities in the public health and socioeconomic impacts of COVID-19 have also been attributed to racial capitalism. Whitney Laster Pirtle, Assistant Professor of Sociology at the University of California, Merced, argues in her article that the social conditions developed by racial capitalism:

(a) shape multiple diseases that interact with COVID-19 to influence poor health outcomes; (b) affect disease outcomes through increasing multiple risk factors for poor, people of color, including racial residential segregation, homelessness, and medical bias; (c) shape access to flexible resources, such as medical knowledge and freedom, which can be used to minimize both risks and the consequences of disease; and (d) replicate historical patterns of inequities within pandemics, despite newer intervening mechanisms thought to ameliorate health consequences.

A key case study Pirtle uses to illustrate the role of racial capitalism in COVID-19 health disparities is the overrepresentation in mortality among Black Americans in Detroit, Michigan. Public health statistics reveal that Black residents accounted for 40% of COVID-19 deaths in a state where they comprise only 14% of the population. According to Pirtle, this disparity is due to structural violence resulting from a racial capitalist system. She describes how racial capitalism influences multiple disease factors and increases multiple disease risk factors through racial residential segregation, which, through governmental housing policies, is initiated and perpetuated by underlying racism in legislative and economic institutions, and is ultimately enforced by the judicial system. Studies show that racial residential segregation decreases access among minority communities to green spaces and healthy, affordable foods, and increases exposure to environmental toxins and hazards, which in turn discourage healthy lifestyles and compel communities of color to live in harmful physical and social environments. Specifically in Detroit, a study by health researchers at the University of Michigan argues that racial and spatial relations, such as racial residential segregation, are fundamental determinants of health. Mapping data indicates that Detroit is one of the most segregated cities in the United States, and also ranks among the top 20 major cities in the U.S. with the highest rates of homelessness supporting the argument that families of color in Detroit face increased risk for COVID-19 impacts due to increased risk factors resulting from racial residential segregation. Moreover, Pirtle argues that racial capitalism restricts minority communities' access to resources such as quality healthcare, which wealthy, white residents are better able to access due to societal privileges.

=== Education ===
Education is central to the production and reproduction of racial inequalities globally. According to a paper published by Jessica Gerrard, Arathi Sriprakash, and Sophie Rudolph, the systems of formal education cannot be separated from colonial and national projects that have oppressed, enslaved, and assimilated people based on race. Gerrard's paper proposes three main arguments:

1. "The ongoing enclosures and dispossession of land and people, with which the material infrastructures of education are built"
2. "The racialized divisions of labour which education systems not only create but are also premised on"
3. "The extraction of value in and through education, normalizing hierarchized life, and steeped in racial capitalism’s defining project of dehumanization"

Gerrard goes on to state that education can promise renewal and justice but can also promise enclosure and dispossession. This promise can be seen in the role of mass schooling in cultural assimilation, linguistic erasure, and the systematic destruction of knowledge or as Gerrard calls it, "epistemicide". Gerrard's view is that the public education system brings value to the individual like how owning land brings value to the individual. This allows for education to have monetary value within a capitalistic society and explains that disparities in education can be attributed to racial capitalism.

=== South Africa and Israel ===
Racial capitalism, though primarily discussed in the context of the United States in modern literature, is theorized to be a global system. Apartheid in South Africa as well as the ongoing Arab-Israeli conflict has been attributed to racial domination and capital accumulation. According to Andy Clarno, the author of Neoliberal Apartheid: Palestine/Israel and South Africa After 1994, two key aspects of capitalism are accumulation by dispossession and coercive labor regimes, which constitute strategies implemented by settler colonial powers in South Africa and Palestine/Israel. Clarno also cites Saskia Sassen's Expulsions: Brutality and Complexity in the Global Economy in explaining that "global capitalism today operates through a 'logic of expulsion' that increasingly dispossesses people of jobs, homes, lands, and welfare benefits." He further argues that forced dispossession of racially devalued people's land and resources is a constant, racialized process of capital accumulation, and forms of labor exploitation such as slavery, sharecropping, indentured servitude, debt peonage, convict labor, and sweatshops are also integral features of capitalism. Moreover, racial capitalist strategies often implement exclusionary protection to reserve jobs for privileged groups. According to Clarno, in South Africa and Palestine/Israel, deracialized neoliberal capitalism was framed as crucial to decolonization by facilitating the democratization of the South African state and the development of an independent Palestinian state. However, in reality, Clarno argues that restructuring has led to "partial decolonization in South Africa and a continuation of settler colonialism in Palestine/Israel; a rearticulation of the relationship between race and class within contexts of expanding inequality and racialized poverty; and an increasing reliance on violence to police the racialized poor and secure the powerful."

== Critiques ==
Critics of Robinson's conceptualization of racial capitalism mainly question the connection between race and capitalism as well as whether such a connection is necessary, and also critique the clarity and basis of existing literature on racial capitalism.

Julian Go, Professor of Sociology at the University of Chicago, highlights three tensions in the theory of racial capitalism: "(1) whether “race” as opposed to other forms of difference is the primary mode of differentiation in capitalism, (2) whether deficiencies in existing theory warrant the new concept "racial capitalism," and (3) whether the connection between race and capitalism is a contingent or logical necessity." Go argues that the term "racial capitalism" refers to relationships between racial inequality and capitalism. Older literature had not specified a single set of causal relations or connections between them; thus the concept of racial capitalism did not entirely reflect a fully formed sociological theory.

Another similar critique by anthropologists Michael Ralph and Maya Singhal evaluates existing literature on racial capitalism, maintaining that the terms "race" and "capitalism" are rarely delineated and that some scholars use racial capitalism to view Black subjectivity as a debilitated condition and treat slavery as an abject status specific to capitalism while failing to provide sufficient theoretical or historical justification.

== Current literature ==
Current literature in the humanities and social sciences has evolved to understand both racialization and capitalization as overlapping and interdependent. Ethnic studies scholar Emily Katzenstein notes that such entanglement can help explain recent global events. When understood from both a lens of sociological theory and historical application, racial capitalism can reveal the origins of global events and injustices.

Other scholars such as Walzer claim that "the theory of racial capitalism [pushes] contemporary leftist towards the same mistake socialists made long ago: to think that we only need to fight on one front, when in fact we need to fight on many fronts." He emphasizes that for activist work, one cannot exist or work in silos, especially when movements are interconnected. He also explains that what is anti-racist is not always anti-capitalist and vice versa.

Katzenstein points out that examining the link between racism and capitalism allows for political action, such as the ability for activists to connect economic precarity with racial injustice. This makes space for "materialist accounts of racism", which remain key in political debates in the U.S.

Katzenstein cites scholar Penny von Eschen's Race Against Empire, who outlines the conceptualization of racism throughout history. Eschen moves from descriptions of "sophisticated analysis rooted in history", "disease", "a psychological or spiritual problem", "as a characteristic of backward peoples", to "demonstrating that racist practices led to enormous corporate profit", then finally to "racism was bad business, and bad business was bad for America". This outline provided can demonstrate race and capitalism over history, and how oppression plays a role in both.

== See also ==
- Black radical tradition
- Class conflict
- History of communism
- History of capitalism
- History of capitalist theory
- Racial equality
- Settler colonialism
- Slave Trade
- Social equality
- Split labor market theory
