= Historical Materialism (journal) =

- Discipline: Marxist philosophy, historical materialism, political science
- Language: English

Publication details
- History: 1997–present
- Publisher: Brill Publishers on behalf of the SOAS University of London
- Frequency: Quarterly
- Impact factor: 0.6 (2022)

Standard abbreviations
- ISO 4: Hist. Mater.

Indexing
- ISSN: 1465-4466 (print); 1569-206X (web)
- LCCN: sn98018404
- OCLC no.: 39026496

Links
- Journal homepage; Online access; Journal page at publisher's website

Historical Materialism is a quarterly peer-reviewed academic journal focused on the study of Marxist philosophy, historical materialism, political science, economics, modern society, and human history using a Marxist approach.

The journal, published by Brill Publishers, started as a project at the London School of Economics from 1995 to 1998. Currently it is affiliated with the SOAS University of London. Starting from 2008, the journal organizes an annual conference and a book series.

== Abstracting and indexing ==
The journal is abstracted and indexed in Political Science Abstracts, Sociological Abstracts, Current Contents/Social and Behavioral Sciences, Social Sciences Citation Index, Arts and Humanities Citation Index, and the Journal Citation Reports/Social Sciences Edition. According to the Journal Citation Reports, the journal has a 2022 impact factor of 0.6.

== Book series ==
The Historical Materialism Book Series was initiated by Brill Publishers in 2002. The series, amounting to over 300 books by 2024, includes a mix of "original monographs, translated texts and reprints of 'classics'" in Marxist theory. Paperback versions of books in the series are published by Haymarket Books.
