= Joseph Roach =

American historian

Joseph Roach (born 1947) is an American theater historian and scholar, a Sterling Professor emeritus at Yale University, and also a published author. He was also given an honorary Doctor of Letters by University of Warwick.
