= Costas Douzinas =

Greek philosopher

Costas Douzinas (Greek: Κώστας Δουζίνας; born 1951) is a Greek philosopher of law. He is a professor of law, a founder of the Birkbeck Law School (at Birkbeck, University of London) and the Department of Law of the University of Cyprus, the founding director of the Birkbeck Institute for the Humanities (at Birkbeck, University of London), the President of the Nikos Poulantzas Institute and a former politician.

== Biography ==
Douzinas was born in Piraeus. He was educated in Athens during the Colonels dictatorship. He left Greece in 1974 and continued his studies in London, where he received a Master's and PhD from the LSE and, in Strasbourg, where he received the degree for teachers of Human Rights. Douzinas joined Birkbeck College in 1992 to set up its School of Law. He was Head of Department from 1996 to 2002. He was the dean of the Faculty of Arts and Humanities from 2002 to 2008. He was the pro-vice master at Birkbeck for international links from 2008 to 2014. In 2004, Douzinas set up the Birkbeck Institute for the Humanities and became its director in 2008. Douzinas was a member of the group that established the Department of Law at the University of Cyprus and is a member of its international advisory committee.

Douzinas has been a visiting professor at many universities, including the University of Athens, Paris, Thessaloniki and Prague. In 1997 he was awarded a Jean Monnet fellowship by the European University Institute, Florence. In 1998 he was a visiting fellow at Princeton University and at the Cardozo School of Law. Douzinas has been a Fellow at Griffith University, Brisbane and at the Universities of Beijing, Nanjing and Pretoria. He became a Visiting Professor of the Institute for Social Justice, Sydney, in 2014, and of the School of Politics, PUC-Rio de Janeiro in 2011. Douzinas has received many awards for his academic work.

Douzinas is well known for his work in human rights, aesthetics, critical jurisprudence, postmodern legal theory and political philosophy. He was deeply involved in the British Critical Legal Studies Movement from the outset and was part of the team which set up the Birkbeck Law School. He was involved in setting up Law and Critique: The International Journal of Critical Legal Thought and has been its managing editor since 2000. Douzinas established and is the managing editor of Birkbeck Law Press. He received the lifelong achievement award by the Association of Law, Culture and the Humanities in 2014.

Douzinas contributes articles and columns to newspapers and websites around Europe, including the Guardian and open democracy. He writes the fortnightly column Political and Philosophical Current in Efimerida Syntakton. His many books have been translated in twelve languages.

In 2015, Douzinas was elected member of Hellenic Parliament for SYRIZA, the Coalition of the Radical Left and President of the Permanent Committee of National Defence and Foreign Affairs. In 2018, he was elected President of the Nikos Poulantzas Institute.

== Bibliography ==
- "States of Exception: Human Rights, Biopolitics. Utopia" (Elgar 2023)
- "Life in Dark Times" (ebook, Nissos 2023) with Michael Bartsidis
- "Left Governmentally" (ebook, Nissos 2023) with Michael Bartsidis
- The Radical Philosophy of Rights (Routledge, 2019)
- From the University Chair to Parliament's Benches: The Life and Times of a Left Government (Nissos, 2019)
- Syriza in Power: Reflections of an Accidental Politician (Polity 2017)
- The Meaning of Human Rights (CUP, 2014), with Conor Gearty
- Cambridge Companion to Human Rights Law (CUP, 2013), with Conor Gearty
- Philosophy and Resistance in the Crisis (Polity, 2013), translated in 4 languages
- The Idea of Communism (Verso, 2012), with Slavoj Zizek
- Critical Legal Thinking: Law and the Political (with Matthew Stone and Illan rua Wall) (Birkbeck Law Press/Routledge, 2012)
- Nomos and Aesthetics (Athens: Papazissis, 2009)
- Adieu, Derrida (Palgrave Macmillan, 2007)
- Human Rights and Empire: The Political Philosophy of Cosmopolitanism (Routledge Cavendish, 2007) translated in five languages
- Critical Jurisprudence (with Adam Gearey) (Hart, 2005)
- The End of Human Rights (Hart, 2000) translated in six languages
- Law and the Image: The Authority of Art and the Aesthetics of Law (with Lynn Nead) (University of Chicago Press, 1999)
- Justice Miscarried: Ethics and Aesthetics in Law (with Ronnie Warrington) (Prentice-Hall, 1995)
- Politics, Postmodernity and Critical Legal Studies: The Legality of the Contingent (Routledge, 1994)
- Postmodern Jurisprudence (Routledge, 1990), with Ronnie Warrington
