= Cedric Robinson =

American professor (1940–2016)

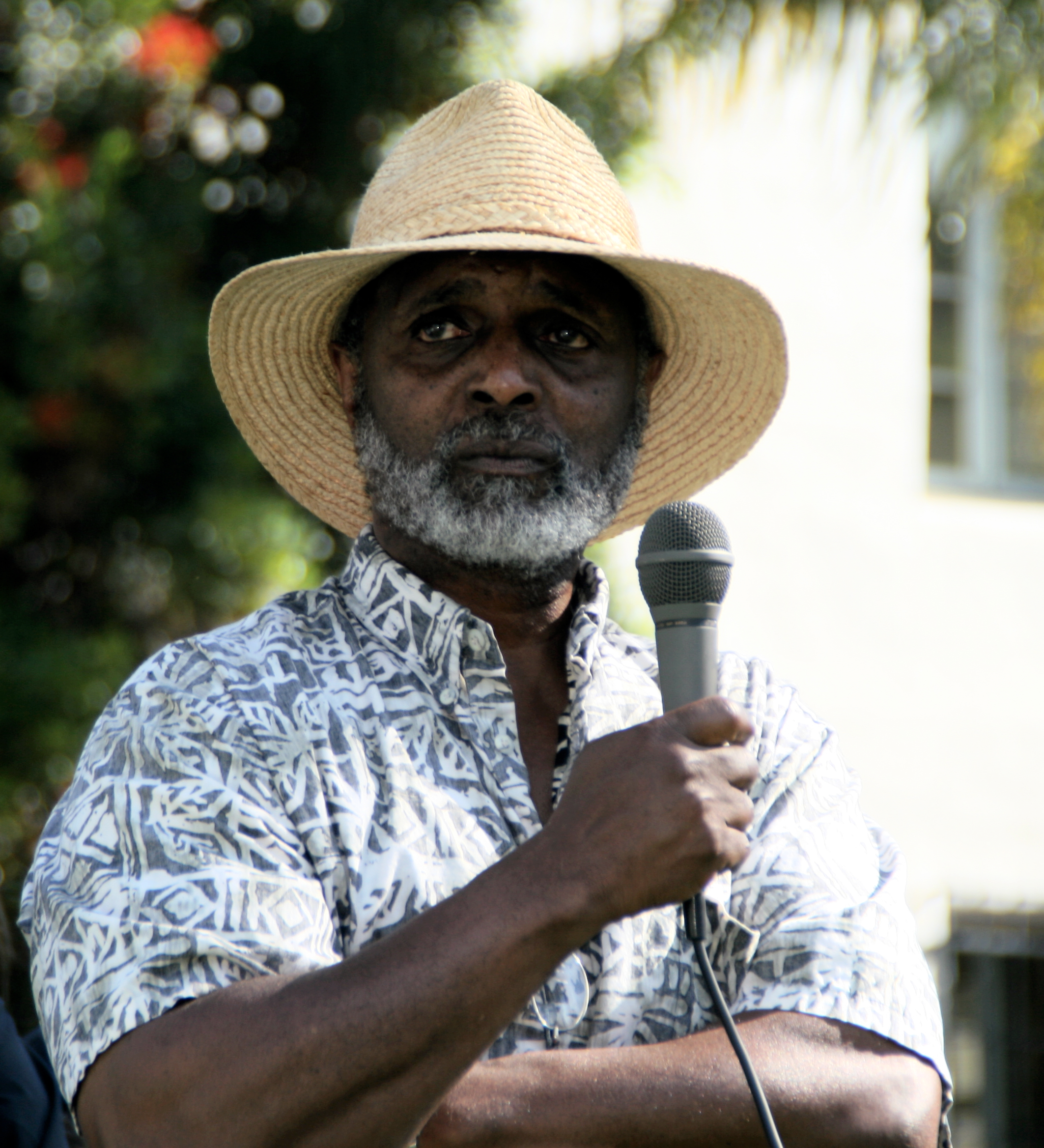
- Robinson in 2006
- Born: Cedric James Hill; November 5, 1940; Oakland, California, U.S.
- Died: June 5, 2016 (aged 75)
- Other name: Cedric James Robinson
- Education: University of California, Berkeley; San Francisco State University; Stanford University

Cedric James Robinson (November 5, 1940 – June 5, 2016) was an American professor in the Department of Black Studies and the Department of Political Science at the University of California, Santa Barbara (UCSB). He headed the Department of Black Studies and the Department of Political Science. He served as the director of the Center for Black Studies Research. Robinson's areas of interest included classical and modern political philosophy, radical social theory in the African diaspora, comparative politics, racial capitalism, and the relationships between and among media and politics.

== Early life ==
Robinson was given the name Cedric James Hill when he was born on November 5, 1940, in Alameda County, California. He grew up in Oakland, California. He attended the University of California, Berkeley, where he earned a B.A. degree in social anthropology in 1963, and Stanford University, where he received an M.A. and Ph.D. in political theory in 1974.

He became a political activist during his student days, when he protested against the university administration and American foreign and domestic policies along with other Black radical students. He was part of the Afro-American Association at Berkeley, a student group that discussed Black identity, African decolonization, historical and contemporary racism, and related topics.

Robinson's grandfather, Winston "Cap" Whiteside, influenced his radical political views. His grandfather had been forced to flee after defending his wife Cecilia, Robinson's future grandmother, from an abusive boss in their hometowns of Mobile, Alabama, and decided to go to California during the Great Migration in the 1920s. Robinson named C. L. R. James and Terence Hopkins as other thinkers who shaped his political outlook.

== Career and public service ==
After leaving Berkeley, Robinson was drafted into the U.S. Army and also worked at the Alameda County Probation Department. From 1971 to 1973, he was a lecturer in Political Science and Black Studies at the University of Michigan. In 1973, he accepted his first tenure-track job at Binghamton University–State University of New York. In 1978, Robinson joined the faculty at the University of California, Santa Barbara, and became director of the Center for Black Studies Research.

In 1980, trying to correct what they saw as overall media bias as well as media laziness in accepting what the White House, the US State Department, and The Pentagon said about the Third World and American relations with it, Robinson and UCSB student Corey Dubin started Third World News Review (TWNR) on the campus and community radio station, KCSB. Five years later the program became available on public access television. Since 1980, UCSB students from the Third World and other UCSB faculty members have contributed to the program, produced it, or both.

The author of five books, Robinson also had articles appear in academic journals and anthologies on subjects ranging from political thought in the United States, Africa, and the Caribbean to Western social theory, film, and the press.

== Selected bibliography ==
- Forgeries of Memory & Meaning: Blacks & the Regimes of Race in American Theater & Film Before World War II. Chapel Hill, NC: University of North Carolina Press, 2007.
- An Anthropology of Marxism. 1st ed., London: Ashgate Publishing, 2001. 2nd ed., Chapel Hill, NC: University of North Carolina Press, 2019.
- Black Movements in America. New York: Routledge, 1997.
- Black Marxism: The Making of the Black Radical Tradition. 1st ed., London: Zed Books, 1983. 2nd ed., Chapel Hill, NC: University of North Carolina Press, 2000. 3rd ed., Chapel Hill, NC: University of North Carolina Press, 2020.
- Terms of Order: Political Science and the Myth of Leadership. 1st ed., Albany, NY: State University of New York Press, 1980. 2nd ed., Chapel Hill, NC: University of North Carolina Press, 2016.

== Secondary Literature ==
- Myers, Joshua (2021) : Cedric Robinson: the time of the Black radical tradition. Polity, Cambridge
- Nimtz, August H. (2026): "Black Marxism": A Marxist Critique, Monthly Review Press, New York
