= Criticism of capitalism =

Arguments against the economic system of capitalism

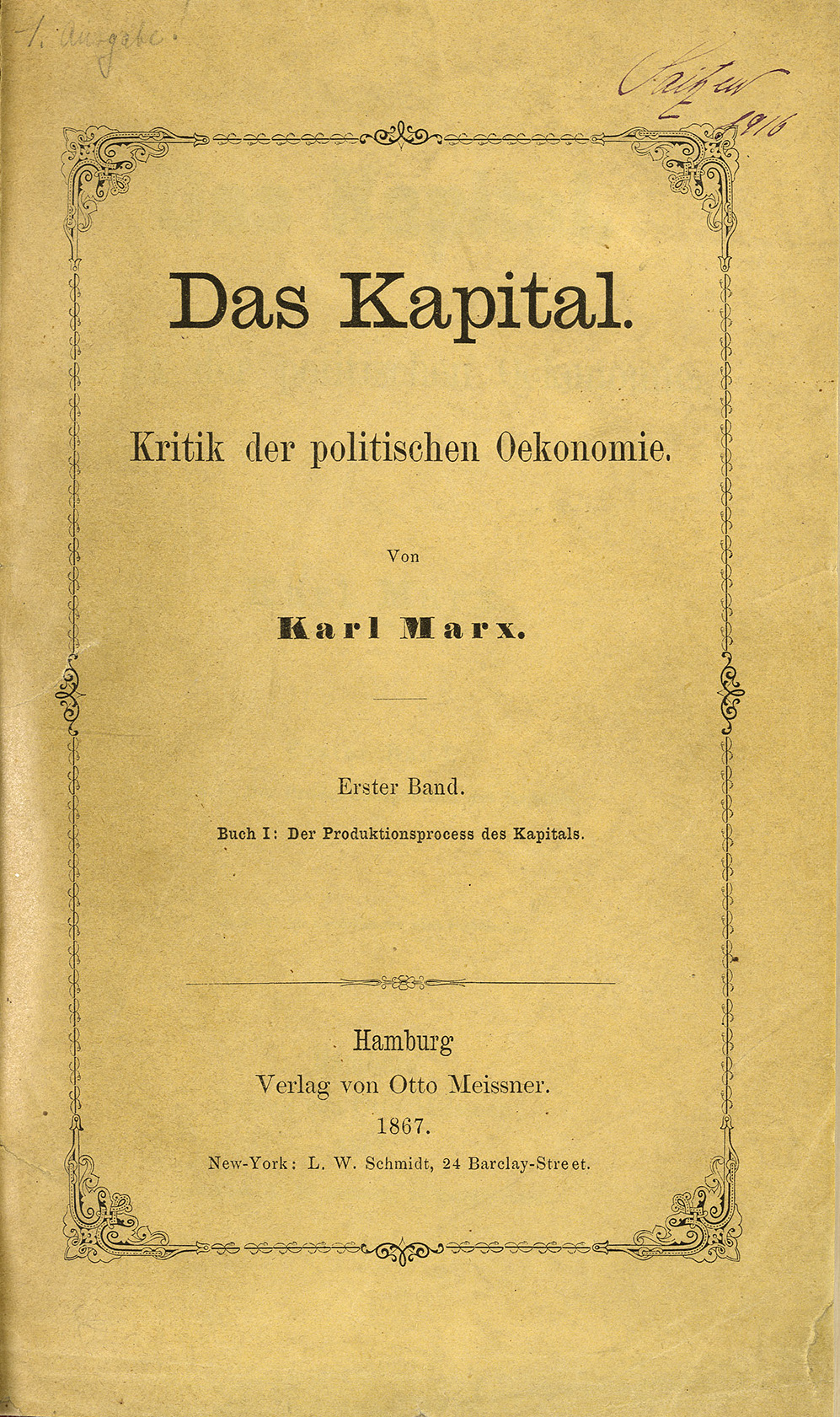
Karl Marx's three-volume Das Kapital is one of the most famous written critiques of capitalism.

Criticism of capitalism typically ranges from disagreement with particular aspects or outcomes of capitalism to rejection of the capitalist system in its entirety. Criticism comes from various political and philosophical perspectives, including anarchist, socialist, religious, and nationalist viewpoints. Some believe that capitalism can only be overcome through revolution, while others believe that structural change can occur gradually through political reforms. Some critics believe that capitalism has merits and wish to balance it with some form of social control, typically through government regulation (e.g., the social market movement).

Prominent among critiques of capitalism are accusations that it is inherently exploitative, alienating, unstable, and unsustainable; that it creates massive economic inequality, commodifies people, is anti-democratic; and leads to an erosion of human rights and national sovereignty. Meanwhile, it incentivises imperialist expansion and war and benefits a small minority at the expense of the majority of the population. Environmental scientists and activists, leftists, and degrowthers have also criticised capitalism for depleting resources, causing climate change, biodiversity loss, topsoil loss, eutrophication, and for generating massive amounts of pollution and waste.

== History ==
Early critics of capitalism, such as Friedrich Engels, claimed that rapid industrialization in Europe created unfair working conditions, including 14-hour work days, child labor, and shanty towns. Some modern economists argue that average living standards did not improve, or only very slowly improved, before 1840.

Writing in 2025, Harvard historian Sven Beckert describes the other story of capitalism as one including the exploitation of labour, slavery, colonialism, war, environmental devastation and immiseration. He concludes "In this story, capitalism is an insatiable demon on a planet-threatening trajectory with staggering social costs."

== Criticism by different schools of thought ==
=== Anarchism ===
French anarchist Pierre-Joseph Proudhon opposed government privilege that protects capitalist, banking, and land interests and the accumulation or acquisition of property (and any form of coercion that led to it), which he believed hampers competition and keeps wealth in the hands of the few. The Spanish individualist anarchist Miguel Giménez Igualada sees "capitalism is an effect of government; the disappearance of government means capitalism falls from its pedestal vertiginously ... That which we call capitalism is not something else but a product of the State, within which the only thing that is being pushed forward is profit, good or badly acquired. And so to fight against capitalism is a pointless task, since be it State capitalism or Enterprise capitalism, as long as Government exists, exploiting capital will exist. The fight, but of consciousness, is against the State".

Within anarchism, there emerged a critique of wage slavery, which refers to a situation perceived as quasi-voluntary slavery, where a person's livelihood depends on wages, especially when the dependence is total and immediate. It is a negatively connoted term used to draw an analogy between slavery and wage labor by focusing on similarities between owning and renting a person. The term "wage slavery" has been used to criticize economic exploitation and social stratification, with the former seen primarily as unequal bargaining power between labor and capital (particularly when workers are paid comparatively low wages, e.g. in sweatshops) and the latter as a lack of workers' self-management, fulfilling job choices and leisure in an economy.

Libertarian socialists believe that if freedom is valued, society must work towards a system in which individuals have the power to decide on economic and political issues. Libertarian socialists seek to replace unjustified authority with direct democracy, voluntary federation, and popular autonomy in all aspects of life, including physical communities and economic enterprises. With the advent of the Industrial Revolution, thinkers such as Proudhon and Marx elaborated the comparison between wage labor and slavery in the context of a critique of societal property not intended for active personal use, Luddites emphasized the dehumanization brought about by machines while later Emma Goldman famously denounced wage slavery by saying: "The only difference is that you are hired slaves instead of block slaves". American anarchist Emma Goldman believed that the economic system of capitalism was incompatible with human liberty. "The only demand that property recognizes", she wrote in Anarchism and Other Essays, "is its own gluttonous appetite for greater wealth, because wealth means power; the power to subdue, to crush, to exploit, the power to enslave, to outrage, to degrade". She also argued that capitalism dehumanized workers, "turning the producer into a mere particle of a machine, with less will and decision than his master of steel and iron".

Noam Chomsky contends that there is little moral difference between chattel slavery and renting oneself to an owner or "wage slavery". He feels that it is an attack on personal integrity that undermines individual freedom. He holds that workers should own and control their workplace. Many libertarian socialists argue that large-scale voluntary associations should manage industrial manufacture while workers retain rights to the individual products of their labor. As such, they see a distinction between the concepts of "private property" and "personal possession". Whereas "private property" grants an individual exclusive control over a thing, whether it is in use or not, and regardless of its productive capacity, "possession" grants no rights to things that are not in use.

In addition to anarchist Benjamin Tucker's "big four" monopolies (land, money, tariffs and patents) that have emerged under capitalism, neo-mutualist economist Kevin Carson argues that the state has also transferred wealth to the wealthy by subsidizing organizational centralization in the form of transportation and communication subsidies. He believes that Tucker overlooked this issue because of his focus on individual market transactions, whereas Carson focuses on organizational issues. The theoretical sections of Studies in Mutualist Political Economy are presented as an attempt to integrate marginalist critiques into the labor theory of value. Carson has also been highly critical of intellectual property. The primary focus of his most recent work has been decentralized manufacturing and the informal and household economies. Carson holds that "[c]apitalism, arising as a new class society directly from the old class society of the Middle Ages, was founded on an act of robbery as massive as the earlier feudal conquest of the land. It has been sustained to the present by continual state intervention to protect its system of privilege without which its survival is unimaginable".

Carson coined the pejorative term "vulgar libertarianism", a phrase that describes the use of free-market rhetoric in defense of corporate capitalism and economic inequality. According to Carson, the term is derived from the phrase "vulgar political economy", which Karl Marx described as an economic order that "deliberately becomes increasingly apologetic and makes strenuous attempts to talk out of existence the ideas which contain the contradictions [existing in economic life]".

=== Conservatism and traditionalism ===
In Conservatives Against Capitalism, Peter Kolozi relies on Norberto Bobbio's definition of right and left, dividing the two camps according to their preference for hierarchy or equality, respectively. Kolozi argued that capitalism has faced persistent criticism from the right since the beginning of the Industrial Revolution. Such critics, while heterogeneous, are united in the belief "that laissez-faire capitalism has undermined an established social hierarchy governed by the virtuous or excellent".

In September 2018, Murtaza Hussain wrote in The Intercept about "Conservatives Against Capitalism", stating:

For all their differences, there is one key aspect of the intellectual history charted in "Conservatives Against Capitalism" that deals with an issue of shared concern on both the left and the right: the need for community. One of the grim consequences of the Social Darwinian pressures unleashed by free-market capitalism has been the destruction of networks of community, family, and professional associations in developed societies. ... These so-called intermediate institutions have historically played a vital role giving ordinary people a sense of meaning and protecting them from the structural violence of the state and the market. Their loss has led to the creation of a huge class of atomized and lonely people, cut adrift from traditional sources of support and left alone to contend with the power of impersonal economic forces.

In June 2023, Bridget Ryder wrote in The European Conservative about the degrowth movement, stating:

The capitalist-critical conservative, however, sees possibilities for technological progress and personal freedoms that lie beyond market-driven economics, finding inspiration in European traditions that have been supplanted by industrialisation. Despite the gains in efficiency made within capitalism, many conservatives remain sceptical of the possibility of endless economic growth, particularly given that God is infinite and his creatures, including petroleum and other minerals, are not.

=== Fascism ===
Fascists opposed both international socialism and free-market capitalism, arguing that their views represented a Third Position and claiming to provide a realistic economic alternative that was neither laissez-faire capitalism nor communism. They favored corporatism and class collaboration, believing that the existence of inequality and social hierarchy was natural (contrary to the views of socialists) while also arguing that the state had a role in mediating relations between classes (contrary to the views of economic liberals).

=== Liberalism ===
During the Age of Enlightenment, some proponents of liberalism criticized wage slavery. However, classical liberalism itself was very much an ideology of capitalism, supporting the free market and laissez-faire.

=== Marxism ===
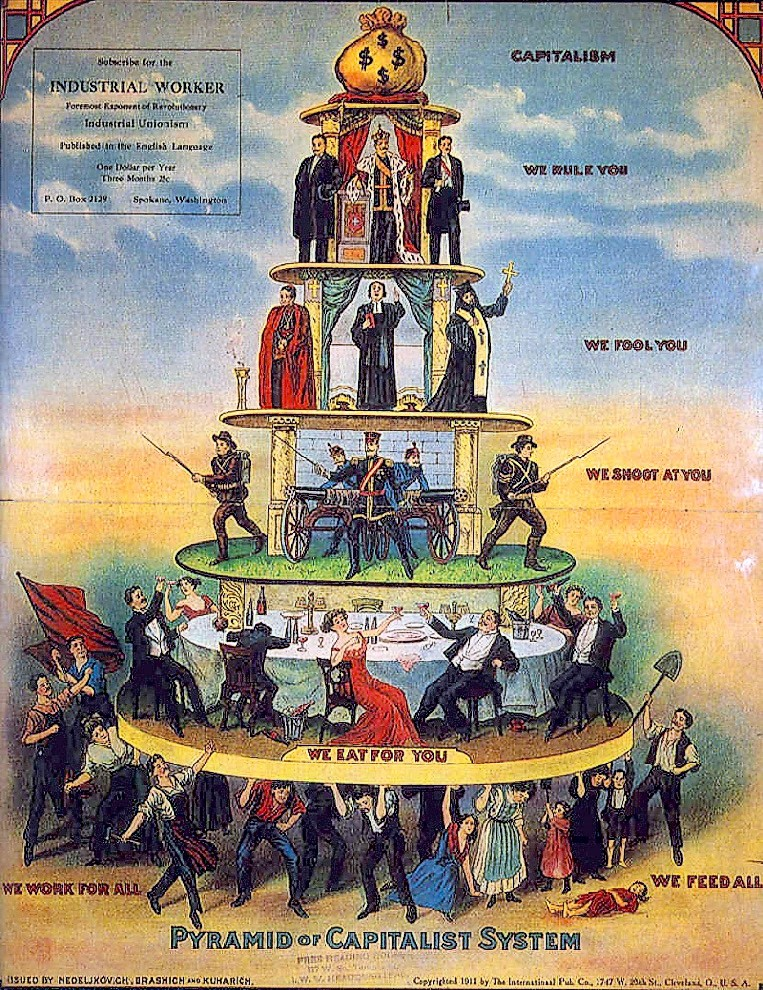
The "Pyramid of Capitalist System" cartoon made by the Industrial Workers of the World (1911) is an example of a socialist critique of capitalism and of social stratification.

Karl Marx considered capitalism to be a historically specific mode of production (the way in which the productive property is owned and controlled, combined with the corresponding social relations between individuals based on their connection with the process of production).

The "capitalistic era", according to Marx, dates from the 16th-century merchants and small urban workshops. Marx knew that wage labour existed on a modest scale for centuries before capitalist industry. For Marx, the capitalist stage of development or "bourgeois society" represented the most advanced form of social organization to date, but he also thought that the working classes would come to power in a worldwide socialist or communist transformation of human society as the end of the series of first aristocratic, then capitalist and finally working class rule was reached.

Following Adam Smith, Marx distinguished the use value of commodities from their exchange value in the market. According to Marx, capital is created by purchasing commodities to produce new commodities whose exchange value exceeds the sum of the original purchases. For Marx, the use of labor power had itself become a commodity under capitalism, and the exchange value of labor power, as reflected in the wage, is less than the value it produces for the capitalist.

This difference in values, he argues, constitutes surplus value, which the capitalists extract and accumulate. In his book Capital, Marx argues that the capitalist mode of production is distinguished by how the owners of capital extract this surplus from workers—all prior class societies had extracted surplus labor, but capitalism was new in doing so via the sale-value of produced commodities. He argues that a core requirement of a capitalist society is that a large portion of the population must not possess sources of self-sustenance that would allow them to be independent and are instead forced to sell their labor for a wage.

In conjunction with his criticism of capitalism, Marx believed that the working class, due to its relationship to the means of production and its numerical superiority under capitalism, would be the driving force behind the socialist revolution.

In Imperialism, the Highest Stage of Capitalism (1916), Vladimir Lenin further developed Marxist theory and argued that capitalism necessarily led to monopoly capitalism and the export of capital—which he also called "imperialism"—to find new markets and resources, representing the last and highest stage of capitalism. Some 20th-century Marxian economists consider capitalism to be a social formation where capitalist class processes dominate, but are not exclusive.

To these thinkers, capitalist class processes are simply those in which surplus labor takes the form of surplus value, usable as capital; other tendencies of the utilization of labor nonetheless exist simultaneously in societies where capitalist processes predominate. However, other late Marxian thinkers argue that a social formation as a whole may be classed as capitalist if capitalism is the mode by which a surplus is extracted, even if this surplus is not produced by capitalist activity, as when an absolute majority of the population is engaged in non-capitalist economic activity.

In Limits to Capital (1982), David Harvey outlines an overdetermined, "spatially restless" capitalism coupled with the spatiality of crisis formation and resolution. Harvey used Marx's theory of crisis to aid his argument that capitalism must have its "fixes", but that we cannot predetermine what fixes will be implemented, nor in what form they will be. His work on the contraction of capital accumulation and the international movements of capitalist modes of production and money flows has been influential. According to Harvey, capitalism creates the conditions for volatile and geographically uneven development.

Sociologists such as Ulrich Beck envisioned the society of risk as a new cultural value, treating risk as a commodity to be exchanged in globalized economies. This theory suggested that disasters and the capitalist economy were inevitably entwined. Disasters allow the introduction of economic programs that would otherwise be rejected, as well as the decentralization of the class structure in production.

=== Religion ===
Many organized religions have criticized or opposed specific elements of capitalism. Traditional Judaism, Christianity, and Islam forbid lending money at interest, although alternative banking methods have been developed. Some Christians have criticized capitalism for its materialist aspects and its inability to account for the well-being of all people. Many of Jesus' parables deal with economic concerns: farming, shepherding, being in debt, doing hard labor, being excluded from banquets and the houses of the rich, and have implications for wealth and power distribution. Catholic scholars and clergy have often criticized capitalism because it disenfranchises the poor, often promoting distributism as an alternative. In his 84-page apostolic exhortation Evangelii gaudium, Pope Francis described unfettered capitalism as "a new tyranny" and called on world leaders to fight rising poverty and inequality, stating:

Some people continue to defend trickle-down theories which assume that economic growth, encouraged by a free market, will inevitably succeed in bringing about greater justice and inclusiveness in the world. This opinion, which has never been confirmed by the facts, expresses a crude and naive trust in the goodness of those wielding economic power and in the sacralized workings of the prevailing economic system. Meanwhile, the excluded are still waiting.

The Catholic Church forbids usury. As established by papal encyclicals Rerum Novarum and Quadragesimo Anno, Catholic social teaching condemns unrestricted capitalism. Pope Benedict XVI criticised capitalism as a system that promotes no duties or obligations toward human beings, fostering a destructive form of individualism. He believed that in capitalist societies, there was an increasing sense of alienation and lack of charity. In 2013, Pope Francis said that more restrictions on the free market were required because the "dictatorship" of the global financial system and the "cult of money" were making people miserable. In his encyclical Laudato si', Pope Francis denounced the role of capitalism in furthering climate change.

Islam forbids lending money at interest (riba), the mode of operation of capitalist finance.

=== Socialism ===
Socialists argue that the accumulation of capital generates waste through externalities that require costly corrective regulatory measures. They also point out that this process generates wasteful industries and practices that exist only to generate sufficient demand for products to be sold at a profit (such as high-pressure advertisement), thereby creating rather than satisfying economic demand.

Socialists argue that capitalism consists of irrational activity, such as purchasing commodities only to sell them later when their prices appreciate (known as speculation), rather than for consumption. Therefore, a crucial criticism often made by socialists is that making money, or the accumulation of capital, does not correspond to satisfying demand (the production of use-values). The fundamental criterion for economic activity in capitalism is the accumulation of capital for reinvestment in production. This spurs the development of new, non-productive industries that do not produce use value and exist solely to keep the accumulation process afloat. An example of a non-productive industry is the financial industry, which contributes to the formation of economic bubbles.

Socialists view relations of private property as limiting the potential of productive forces in the economy. According to socialists, private property becomes obsolete when it is concentrated in centralized, socialized institutions based on the private appropriation of revenue (but on cooperative work and internal planning in the allocation of inputs), until the role of the capitalist becomes redundant. With no need for capital accumulation and a class of owners, private property of the means of production is perceived as being an outdated form of economic organization that should be replaced by a free association of individuals based on public or common ownership of these socialized assets. Private ownership imposes constraints on planning, leading to uncoordinated economic decisions that result in business fluctuations, unemployment, and a tremendous waste of material resources during a crisis of overproduction.

Excessive disparities in income distribution lead to social instability and require costly corrective measures, such as redistributive taxation. This incurs high administrative costs, weakens the incentive to work, invites dishonesty, and increases the likelihood of tax evasion (the corrective measures), while reducing the overall efficiency of the market economy. These corrective policies limit the market's incentive system by providing things such as minimum wages, unemployment insurance, taxing profits, and reducing the reserve army of labor, resulting in reduced incentives for capitalists to invest in more production. In essence, social welfare policies cripple capitalism's incentive system and are thus unsustainable in the long run.

Marxists argue that the establishment of a socialist mode of production is the only way to overcome these deficiencies. Socialists, and specifically Marxian socialists, argue that the inherent conflict of interests between the working class and capital prevents the optimal use of available human resources and leads to contradictory interest groups (labor and business) striving to influence the state to intervene in the economy at the expense of overall economic efficiency.

Early socialists (utopian socialists and Ricardian socialists) criticized capitalism for concentrating power and wealth within a small segment of society who do not utilize available technology and resources to their maximum potential in the interests of the public.

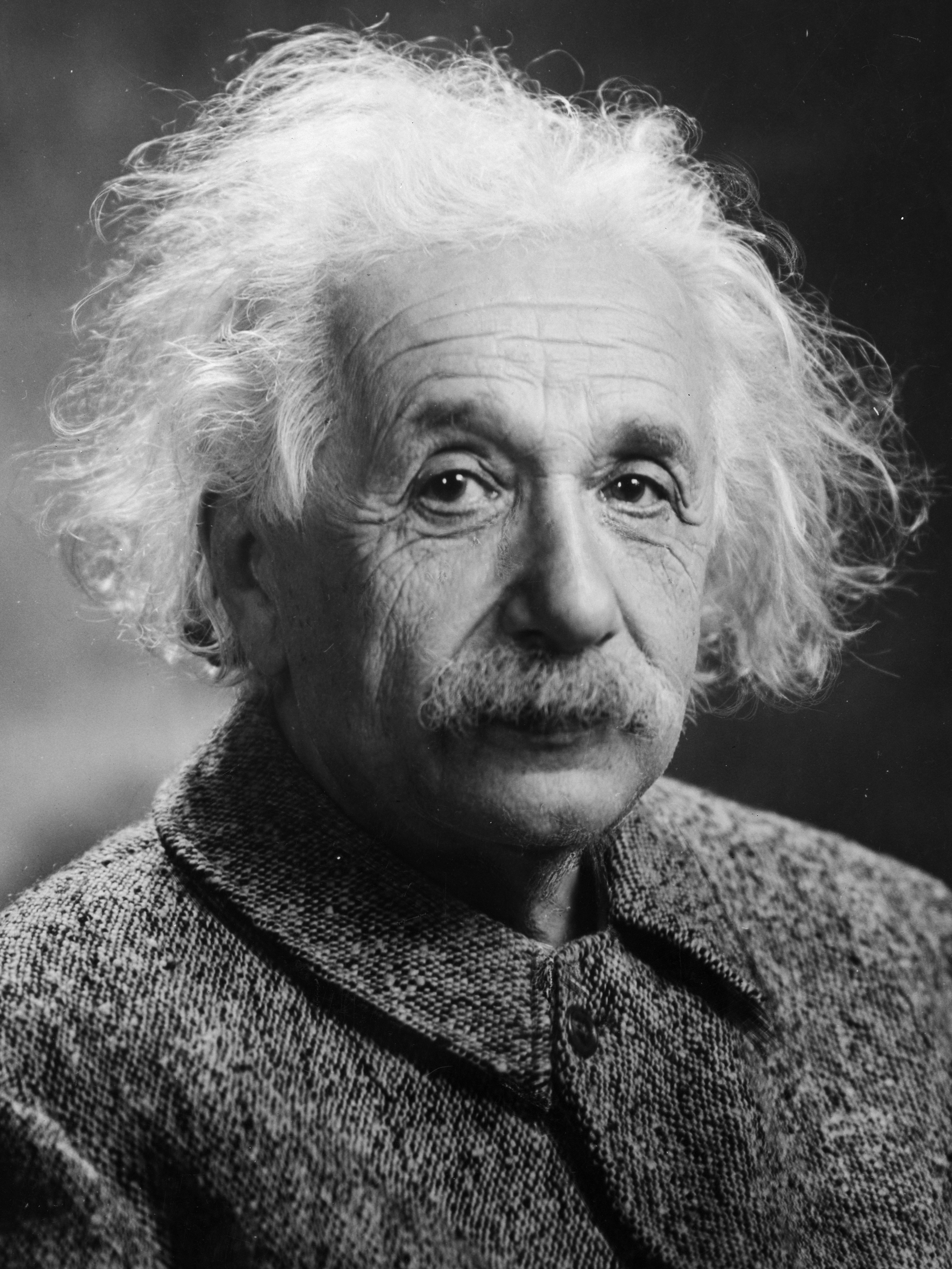
Albert Einstein advocated for a socialist planned economy with his 1949 article "Why Socialism?"

In the May 1949 issue of the Monthly Review titled "Why Socialism?", Albert Einstein wrote:

I am convinced there is only one way to eliminate (the) grave evils (of capitalism), namely through the establishment of a socialist economy, accompanied by an educational system which would be oriented toward social goals. In such an economy, the means of production are owned by society itself and are utilized in a planned fashion. A planned economy, which adjusts production to the needs of the community, would distribute the work to be done among all those able to work and would guarantee a livelihood to every man, woman, and child. The education of the individual, in addition to promoting his own innate abilities, would attempt to develop in him a sense of responsibility for his fellow-men in place of the glorification of power and success in our present society.

=== Critique of capitalism as a form of life ===
Following the path of Critical Theory, Rahel Jaeggi, with her proposal to view the economy as a form of life—a set of social practices that reflect patterns of custom and provide instances of problem solving—argues that critiques of capitalism should be taken forward as critiques of its normative aspect. Therefore, she addresses these critiques in terms of their functional, moral, and ethical dimensions.

This approach, according to the author, offers some advantages by exposing the fact that economic practices in capitalism—often seen as neutral, natural, or even free of normative values—have their own inherent normative conditions of success, or ethical-functional norms, indispensable to their functioning. This systematic view also enables visualization of the mechanisms of social integration, which are not necessarily intentional or planned and are entangled with other non-economic practices.

== Topics of criticism ==
=== Democracy and freedom ===
Economist Branko Horvat stated that "[I]t is now well known that capitalist development leads to the concentration of capital, employment, and power. It is somewhat less known that it leads to the almost complete destruction of economic freedom".

Critics argues that capitalism is in fact not a democracy, but a plutocracy, because in capitalism there is a lack of political, democratic and economic power for the vast majority of the population. They say this is because, in capitalism, the means of production are owned privately by a minority of the population, with the vast majority having no control over the economy, and because it creates large concentrations of money and property in the hands of the elite, leading to vast wealth and income inequalities between the elite and the majority of the population. Evidence for the fact that capitalism is plutocratic can be seen in policies that benefit capitalists at the expense of workers, such as policies where taxes are raised on workers and reduced for capitalists, and the retirement age being increased despite it being against the will of the people. "Corporate capitalism" and "inverted totalitarianism" are terms used by critics to describe a capitalist marketplace—and society—characterized by the dominance of hierarchical, bureaucratic, large corporations, which are legally required to pursue profit without concern for social welfare. Corporate capitalism has been criticized for the extent of power and influence that corporations and large business interest groups have over government policy, including the policies of regulatory agencies and political campaigns. Many social scientists have criticized corporations for failing to act in the interests of the people; they claim the existence of large corporations seems to circumvent the principles of democracy, which assumes equal power relations between all individuals in a society. As part of the political left, activists against corporate power and influence work towards a decreased income gap and improved economic equity.

"Capitalism is the astounding belief that the most wickedest of men will do the most wickedest of things for the greatest good of everyone".

— John Maynard Keynes

The rise of giant multinational corporations has been a topic of concern among the aforementioned scholars, intellectuals and activists, who see the large corporation as leading to deep, structural erosion of such basic human rights and civil rights as equitable wealth and income distribution, equitable democratic political and socio-economic power representation and many other human rights and needs. They have pointed out that in their view large corporations create false needs in consumers and—they contend—have had a long history of interference in and distortion of the policies of sovereign nation states through high-priced legal lobbying and other almost always legal, powerful forms of influence peddling. In their view, evidence supporting this belief includes invasive advertising (such as billboards, television ads, adware, spam, telemarketing, child-targeted advertising and guerrilla marketing), massive open or secret corporate political campaign contributions in so-called "democratic" elections, corporatocracy, the revolving door between government and corporations, regulatory capture, "too big to fail" (also known as "too big to jail"), massive taxpayer-provided corporate bailouts, socialism/communism for the very rich and brutal, vicious, Darwinian capitalism for everyone else, and—they claim—seemingly endless global news stories about corporate corruption (Martha Stewart and Enron, among other examples). Anti-corporate-activists express the view that large corporations answer only to large shareholders, giving human rights issues, social justice issues, environmental issues and other issues of high significance to the bottom 99% of the global human population virtually no consideration. American political philosopher Jodi Dean says that contemporary economic and financial calamities have dispelled the notion that capitalism is a viable economic system, adding that "the fantasy that democracy exerts a force for economic justice has dissolved as the US government funnels trillions of dollars to banks and European central banks rig national governments and cut social programs to keep themselves afloat."

According to Quinn Slobodian, one way capitalism undermines democracy is by "punching holes in the territory of the nation state" to create special economic zones, of which there are 5,400 around the globe, ranging from tax havens to "sites for low-wage production . . . often ringed by barbed wire," that he describes as "zones of exception with different laws and often no democratic oversight."

David Schweickart wrote: "Ordinary people [in capitalist societies] are deemed competent enough to select their political leaders-but not their bosses. Contemporary capitalism celebrates democracy, yet denies us our democratic rights at precisely the point where they might be utilized most immediately and concretely: at the place where we spend most of the active and alert hours of our adult lives".

Thomas Jefferson, one of the founders of the United States, said "I hope we shall crush ... in its birth the aristocracy of our moneyed corporations, which dare already to challenge our government to a trial of strength and bid defiance to the laws of our country". In a 29 April 1938 message to the U. S. Congress, Franklin D. Roosevelt warned that the growth of private power could lead to fascism, arguing that "the liberty of a democracy is not safe if the people tolerate the growth of private power to a point where it becomes stronger than their democratic state itself. That, in its essence, is fascism—ownership of government by an individual, by a group, or by any other controlling private power. Statistics of the Bureau of Internal Revenue reveal the following figures for 1935: "Ownership of corporate assets: Of all corporations reporting from every part of the Nation, one-tenth of 1 percent of them owned 52 percent of the assets of all of them".

U. S. President Dwight D. Eisenhower criticized the notion of the confluence of corporate power and de facto fascism and in his 1961 Farewell Address to the Nation brought attention to the "conjunction of an immense military establishment and a large arms industry" in the United States and stressed "the need to maintain balance in and among national programs—balance between the private and the public economy, balance between cost and hoped for advantage".

In a 1986 debate on Socialism vs Capitalism with John Judis vs Harry Binswanger and John Ridpath, intellectual Christopher Hitchens said:

capitalism as a system has coexisted with and in on occasion sponsored feudalism, monarchy, fascism, slavery, apartheid, and under development. It has also been the great engine of progress, development and innovation in a certain few heartland countries. This means that it must be a system studied as a system and not as an idea. Its claims to be the sponsor of freedom are purely contingent. It's good propaganda but it's not very good political science

=== Exploitation of workers ===
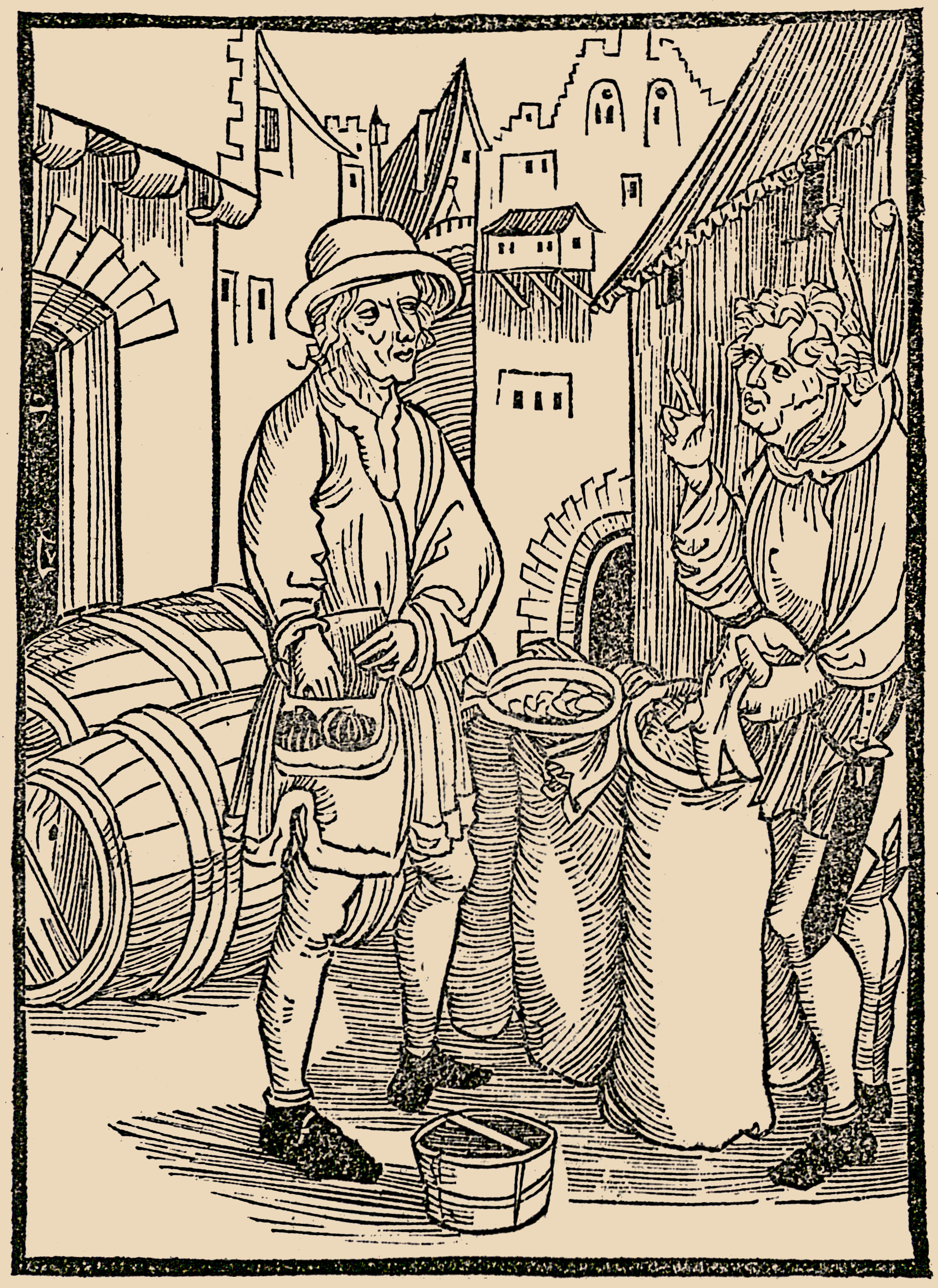
"Of usury", from Sebastian Brant's Stultifera Navis (the Ship of Fools; woodcut attributed to Albrecht Dürer)

Critics of capitalism view the system as inherently exploitative. In an economic sense, exploitation is often related to the expropriation of labor for profit and based on Karl Marx's version of the labor theory of value. The labor theory of value was supported by classical economists like David Ricardo and Adam Smith who believed that "the value of a commodity depends on the relative quantity of labor which is necessary for its production".

"In capitalism, workers are separated from the means of production, implying that they must compete in labour markets to sell their labour power to capitalists in order to earn a living."

— Thomas Wiedmann, lead author of "Scientists' warning on affluence"

In Das Kapital, Marx identified the commodity as the basic unit of capitalist organization. Marx described a "common denominator" among commodities, namely that they are products of labor and are related to each other by an exchange value (i.e., price). By using the labor theory of value, Marxists see a connection between labor and exchange value, in that commodities are exchanged depending on the socially necessary labor time needed to produce them. However, due to the productive forces of industrial organization, laborers are seen as creating more exchange value during the course of the working day than the cost of their survival (food, shelter, clothing and so on). Marxists argue that capitalists are thus able to pay for this cost of survival while expropriating the excess labor (i.e. surplus value).

Marxists further argue that due to economic inequality, the purchase of labor cannot occur under "free" conditions. Since capitalists control the means of production (e.g., factories, businesses, machinery, and so on) and workers control only their labor, the worker is naturally coerced into allowing their labor to be exploited. Critics argue that exploitation occurs even if the exploited consents, since the definition of exploitation is independent of consent. In essence, workers must allow their labor to be exploited or face starvation. Since some degree of unemployment is typical in modern economies, Marxists argue that wages are naturally driven down in free market systems. Hence, even if a worker contests their wages, capitalists can find someone from the reserve army of labor who is more desperate.

The act (or threat) of striking has historically been an organized action to withhold labor from capitalists, without fear of individual retaliation. Some critics of capitalism, while acknowledging the necessity of trade unionism, believe that trade unions reform an already exploitative system, leaving the system of exploitation intact. Lysander Spooner argued that "almost all fortunes are made out of the capital and labour of other men than those who realize them. Indeed, large fortunes could rarely be made at all by one individual, except by his sponging capital and labour from others".

Some labor historians and scholars have argued that unfree labor—by enslaved people, indentured servants, prisoners, or other coerced persons—is compatible with capitalist relations. Tom Brass argued that unfree labor is acceptable to capital. Historian Greg Grandin argues that capitalism has its origins in slavery, saying that "[w]hen historians talk about the Atlantic market revolution, they are talking about capitalism. And when they are talking about capitalism, they are talking about slavery." Some scholars, including Edward E. Baptist, Sven Beckert, and Matthew Desmond, assert that slavery was an integral component in the violent development of American and global capitalism. The Slovenian continental philosopher Slavoj Žižek posits that the new era of global capitalism has ushered in new forms of contemporary slavery, including migrant workers deprived of basic civil rights on the Arabian Peninsula, the total control of workers in Asian sweatshops and the use of forced labor in the exploitation of natural resources in Central Africa.

Academics such as the developmental psychologist Howard Gardner have proposed the adoption of upper limits in individual wealth as "a solution that would make the world a better place". Marxian economist Richard D. Wolff postulates that capitalist economies prioritize profits and capital accumulation over the social needs of communities, and that capitalist enterprises rarely include the workers in the basic decisions of the enterprise.

"Most people have no alternative but to sell their ability to work for a wage and inevitably be paid less than the value they produce. This is the capital order, the backbone of our society that we do not criticize or even discuss."

— Clara Mattei

Political economist Clara E. Mattei of the New School for Social Research demonstrates that the imposition of fiscal, monetary and industrial austerity policies meant to discipline labor by reinforcing hierarchal wage relations and therefore protect the capitalist system through wage repression and the weakening of collective bargaining power by workers can increase their exploitation while boosting the profits of the ownership class, which she says is one of the primary drivers of the "global inequality trend". As an example, Mattei shows that over the last four decades in the United States, the profit share of national output increased while labor's share plummeted, demonstrating a symmetrical relationship between owner profit and worker loss, in which the former took from the latter. She adds that "an increase in exploitation was also evident, with real wages grossly lagging behind labor productivity."

=== Imperialism, political oppression, and genocide ===
Near the start of the 20th century, Vladimir Lenin wrote that state use of military power to defend capitalist interests abroad was an inevitable corollary of monopoly capitalism. He argued that capitalism needs imperialism to survive. According to Lenin, the export of financial capital superseded the export of commodities; banking and industrial capital merged to form large financial cartels and trusts in which production and distribution are highly centralized; and monopoly capitalists influenced state policy to carve up the world into spheres of interest. These trends led states to defend their capitalist interests abroad through military power.

According to anthropologist Jason Hickel, capitalism requires the accumulation of excess wealth in the hands of economic elites for the purpose of large scale investment, continuous growth and expansion, and enormous amounts of cheap labor. As such, there was never and could never have been a gradual or peaceful transition to capitalism, and that "organized violence, mass impoverishment, and the destruction of self-sufficient subsistence economies" ushered in the capitalist era. Its emergence was fueled by immiseration and extreme violence, including indigenous genocide, artificial scarcity and famines, and mass slavery, that accompanied enclosure and colonization, with colonized peoples becoming enslaved workers producing products that were then processed by European peasants, dispossessed by enclosure, who filled the factories in desperation as exploited cheap labor. Hickel adds that there was fierce resistance to these developments, as that the period 1500 to the 1800s, "right into the Industrial Revolution, was among the bloodiest, most tumultuous times in world history."

Sociologist David Nibert argues that while capitalism "turned out to be every bit as violent and oppressive as the social systems dominated by the old aristocrats", it also included "an additional and pernicious peril—the necessity for continuous growth and expansion". As an example of this, Nibert points to the mass killing of millions of buffalo on the Great Plains and the subjugation and expulsion of the indigenous population by the U.S. military in the 19th century for the purpose of expanding ranching operations, and rearing livestock for profit.

Capitalism and capitalist governments have also been criticized by socialists as oligarchic in nature, due to the inevitable inequality.

The military–industrial complex, mentioned in Dwight D. Eisenhower's presidential farewell address, appears to play a significant role in the American capitalist system. It may be one of the driving forces of American militarism and intervention abroad. The United States has used military force and has encouraged and facilitated state terrorism and mass violence to entrench neoliberal capitalism in the Global South, protect the interests of U.S. economic elites, and to crush any possible resistance to this entrenchment, especially during the Cold War, with significant cases being Brazil, Chile and Indonesia.

=== Inefficiency, irrationality, and unpredictability ===
Some opponents criticize capitalism's inefficiency. They note a shift from pre-industrial reuse and thriftiness before capitalism to a consumer-based economy that pushes "ready-made" materials. It is argued that a sanitation industry arose under capitalism that deemed trash valueless—a significant break from the past when much "waste" was used and reused almost indefinitely. In the process, critics say, capitalism has created a profit-driven system based on selling as many products as possible. Critics relate the "ready-made" trend to a growing garbage problem in which, as of 2008, 4.5 pounds of trash are generated per person each day (compared to 2.7 pounds in 1960). Anti-capitalist groups with an emphasis on conservation include eco-socialists and social ecologists.

Planned obsolescence has been criticized as a wasteful practice under capitalism. By designing products to wear out faster than need be, new consumption is generated. This would benefit corporations by increasing sales while at the same time generating excessive waste. A well-known example is the charge that Apple designed its iPod to fail after 18 months. Critics view planned obsolescence as wasteful and an inefficient use of resources. Other authors such as Naomi Klein have criticized brand-based marketing for putting more emphasis on the company's name-brand than on manufacturing products.

Some economists, most notably Marxian economists, argue that the system of perpetual capital accumulation leads to irrational outcomes and a misallocation of resources, as industries and jobs are created for the sake of making money rather than satisfying actual demands and needs.

==== Market failure ====
Market failure is a term used by economists to describe the condition where the allocation of goods and services by a market is not efficient. Keynesian economist Paul Krugman views this scenario in which individuals' pursuit of self-interest leads to bad results for society as a whole. John Maynard Keynes preferred economic interventionism by government to free markets. Some believe that the lack of perfect information and perfect competition in a free market is grounds for government intervention. Others perceive certain unique problems with a free market including: monopolies, monopsonies, insider trading and price gouging.

=== Inequality ===
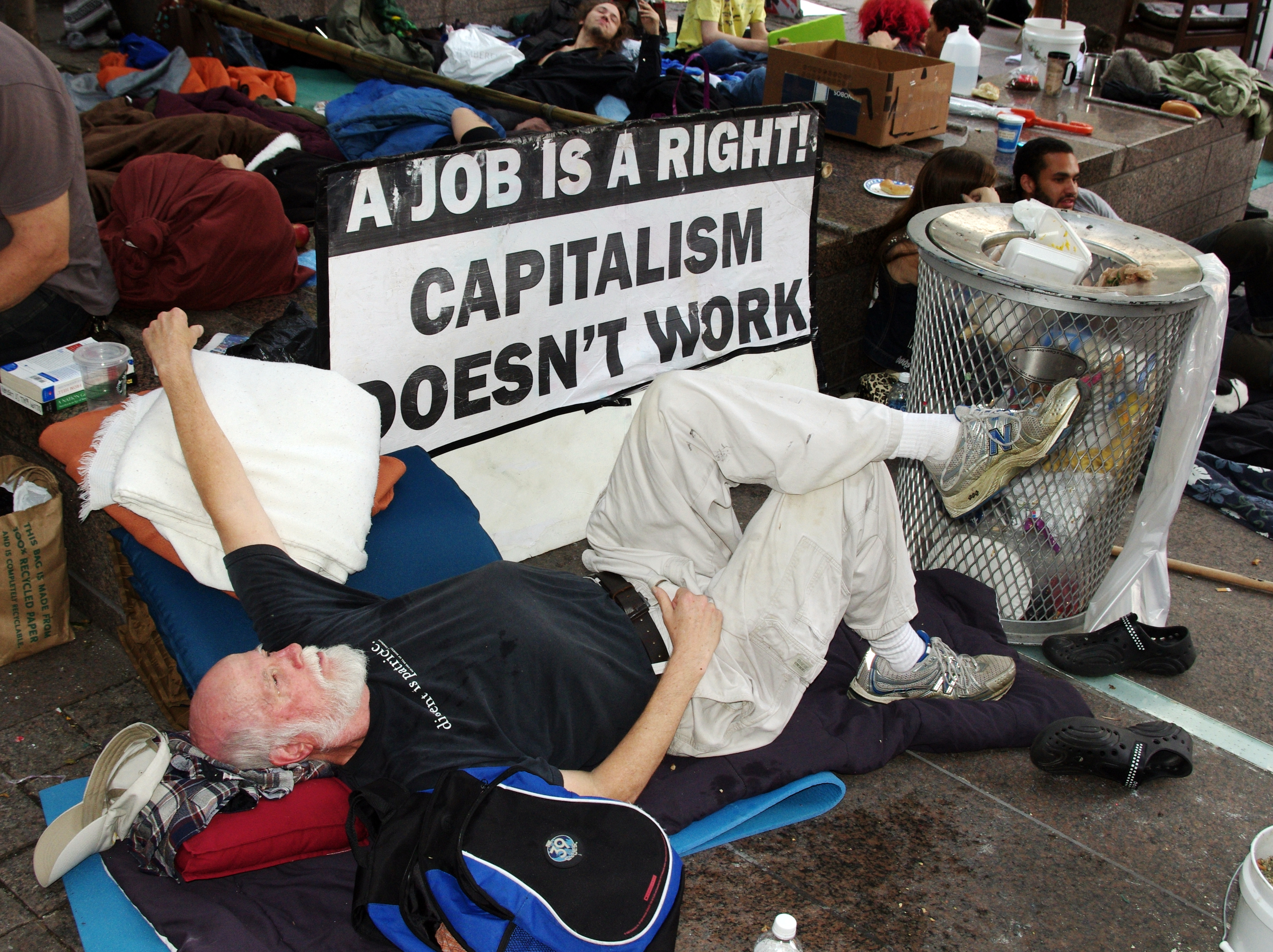
A man at the protest event Occupy Wall Street

Critics argue that capitalism is associated with the unfair distribution of wealth and power; a tendency toward market monopoly or oligopoly (and government by oligarchy); imperialism, counter-revolutionary wars and various forms of economic and cultural exploitation; repression of workers and trade unionists and phenomena such as social alienation, economic inequality, unemployment and economic instability. Critics have argued that there is an inherent tendency toward oligopolistic structures when laissez-faire is combined with capitalist private property. Many socialists regard capitalism as irrational in that production and the direction of the economy are unplanned, creating many inconsistencies and internal contradictions, and thus should be controlled through public policy.

In the early 20th century, Vladimir Lenin argued that state use of military power to defend capitalist interests abroad was an inevitable corollary of monopoly capitalism.

In 2019, Marxian Economist Richard D. Wolff argued that Capitalism is unstable, Capitalism is unequal, and fundamentally Undemocratic.

In a 1965 letter to Carlos Quijano, editor of Marcha, a weekly newspaper published in Montevideo, Uruguay, Che Guevara wrote:

The laws of capitalism, which are blind and are invisible to ordinary people, act upon the individual without he or she being aware of it. One sees only the vastness of a seemingly infinite horizon ahead. That is how it is painted by capitalist propagandists who purport to draw a lesson from the example of Rockefeller—whether or not it is true—about the possibilities of individual success. The amount of poverty and suffering required for a Rockefeller to emerge, and the amount of depravity entailed in the accumulation of a fortune of such magnitude, are left out of the picture, and it is not always possible for the popular forces to expose this clearly. ... It is a contest among wolves. One can win only at the cost of the failure of others.

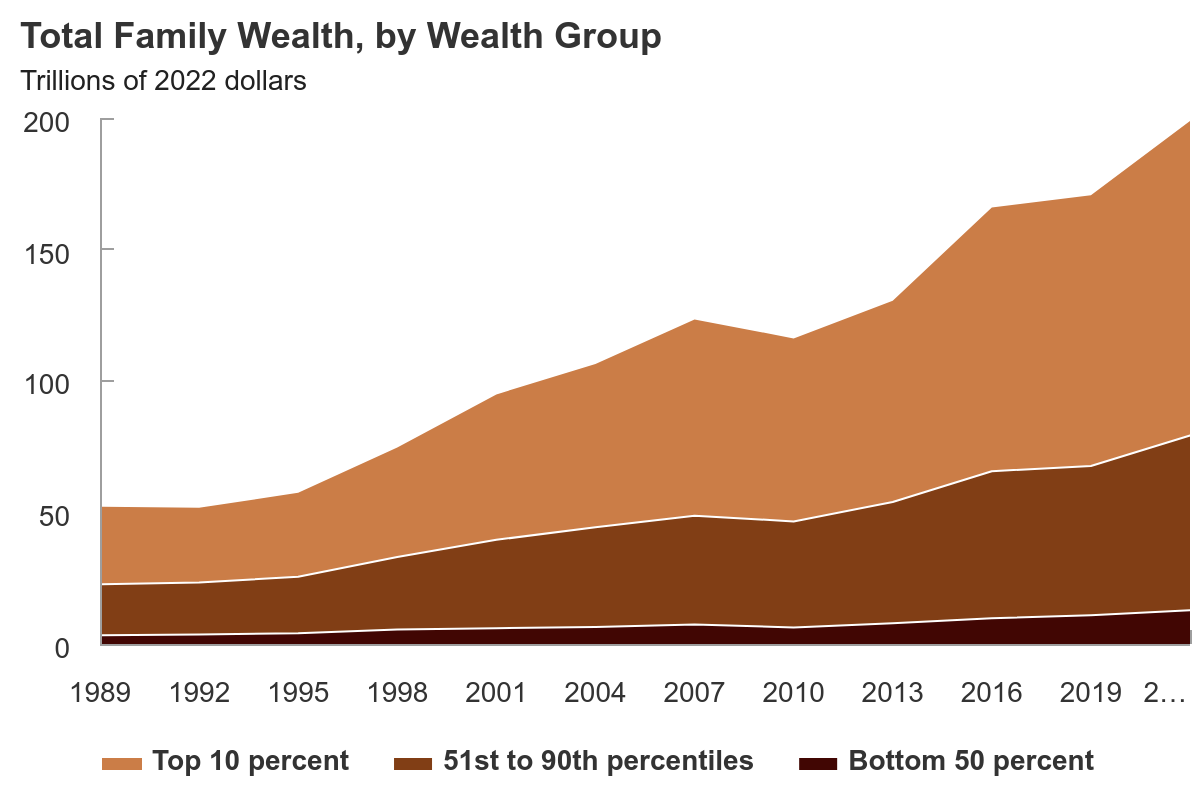
Wealth inequality in the United States increased from 1989 to 2013.

A modern critic of capitalism is Ravi Batra, who focuses on inequality as a source of both immiserization and system failure. Batra popularised the concept "share of wealth held by the richest 1%" as an indicator of inequality and an important determinant of depressions in his best-selling books in the 1980s. The scholars Kristen Ghodsee and Mitchell A. Orenstein suggest that left to its own devices, capitalism will result in a small group of economic elites capturing the majority of wealth and power in society. Dylan Sullivan and Jason Hickel argue that poverty continues to exist in the contemporary global capitalist system despite it being highly productive because it is undemocratic and has maintained conditions of extreme inequality where masses of working people, who have no ownership or control over the means of production, have their labor power "appropriated by a ruling class or an external imperial power," and are cut off from common land and resources. They further contend that capitalism needs significant levels of inequality as capital accumulation requires access to cheap labor, and lots of it, as without it the system would be crippled.

Italian economist and academic Clara Mattei noted in her 2026 book Escape from Capitalism that in Mumbai's Dharavi, one of the largest slums in the world, an estimated 2 million workers produce over $2 billion in wealth, with the majority of it ending up in the bank accounts of large American shareholders, and concluded that "this vast inequality illustrates the deep contradictions of our capitalist economy that must be fought."

"Since value is produced only by workers, capitalists can extract, appropriate and accumulate the surplus part of this value only through exploitation. And exploitation, by definition, negates equality."

— Jonathan Nitzan and Shimshon Bichler.

In the United States, the shares of earnings and wealth of the households in the top 1 percent of the corresponding distributions are 21 percent (in 2006) and 37 percent (in 2009), respectively. Critics, such as Ravi Batra, argue that the capitalist system has inherent biases favoring those who already possess greater resources. The inequality may be propagated through inheritance and economic policy. Rich people are in a position to give their children a better education and inherited wealth, which can create or widen large differences in wealth between people who do not differ in ability or effort. One study shows that in the United States, 43.35% of the people in the Forbes magazine "400 richest individuals" list were already rich enough at birth to qualify. Another study indicated that in the United States wealth, race and schooling are important to the inheritance of economic status, but that IQ is not a major contributor and the genetic transmission of IQ is even less important. Batra has argued that the tax and benefit legislation in the United States since the Reagan presidency has contributed greatly to the inequalities and economic problems and should be repealed.

According to sociologist Thomas Volscho, the neoliberal revolution starting in the late 1970s resulted from a class conflict in which the political mobilizations of an increasingly class-conscious capitalist elite "against the New Deal of the 1930s, War on Poverty programs from the 1960s, and the power of organized labor" dramatically increased both the political power of Wall Street and economic inequality.

=== Market instability ===
Critics of capitalism, particularly Marxists, identify market instability as a permanent feature of the capitalist economy. Marx believed that the unplanned and explosive growth of capitalism does not occur in a smooth manner, but is interrupted by periods of overproduction in which stagnation or decline occur (i.e. recessions). In the view of Marxists, several contradictions in the capitalist mode of production are present, particularly the internal contradiction between anarchy in the sphere of capital (i.e. free market) and socialised production in the sphere of labor (i.e. industrialism). In The Communist Manifesto, Marx and Engels highlighted what they saw as a uniquely capitalist juxtaposition of overabundance and poverty: "Society suddenly finds itself put back into a state of momentary barbarism. And why? Because there is too much civilization, too much means of subsistence, too much industry, too much commerce".

Some scholars blame the 2008 financial crisis on the neoliberal capitalist model. Following the banking crisis of 2007, economist and former Chair of the Federal Reserve, Alan Greenspan told the United States Congress on 23 October 2008 that "[t]his modern risk-management paradigm held sway for decades. The whole intellectual edifice, however, collapsed in the summer of last year", and that "I made a mistake in presuming that the self-interests of organizations, specifically banks and others, were such that they were best capable of protecting their own shareholders and their equity in firms ... I was shocked".

=== Property ===
Pierre-Joseph Proudhon and Friedrich Engels argue that the free market is not necessarily free, but weighted towards those who already own private property. They view capitalist regulations, including the enforcement of private property on land and exclusive rights to natural resources, as unjustly enclosing upon what should be owned by all, forcing those without private property to sell their labor to capitalists and landlords in a market favorable to the latter, thus forcing workers to accept low wages to survive. In his criticism of capitalism, Proudhon believed that the emphasis on private property is the problem. He argued that property is theft, arguing that private property leads to despotism: "Now, property necessarily engenders despotism—the government of caprice, the reign of libidinous pleasure. That is so clearly the essence of property that, to be convinced of it, one need but remember what it is, and observe what happens around him. Property is the right to use and abuse". Many left-wing anarchists, such as anarchist communists, believe in replacing capitalist private property with a system where people can lay claim to things based on personal use and claim that "[private] property is the domination of an individual, or a coalition of individuals, over things; it is not the claim of any person or persons to the use of things" and "this is, usufruct, a very different matter. Property means the monopoly of wealth, the right to prevent others using it, whether the owner needs it or not".

Mutualists and some anarchists support markets and private property, but not in their present form. They argue that particular aspects of modern capitalism violate the ability of individuals to trade in the absence of coercion. Mutualists support markets and private property in the product of labor, but only when these markets guarantee that workers will realize for themselves the value of their labor.

In recent times, most economies have extended private property rights to include such things as patents and copyrights. Critics see these so-called intellectual property laws as coercive against those with few prior resources. They argue that such regulations discourage the sharing of ideas and encourage nonproductive rent seeking behavior, both of which impose a deadweight loss on the economy and erect a prohibitive barrier to market entry. Not all pro-capitalists support the concept of copyrights, but those who do argue that compensation to the creator is necessary as an incentive.

=== Environmental sustainability ===
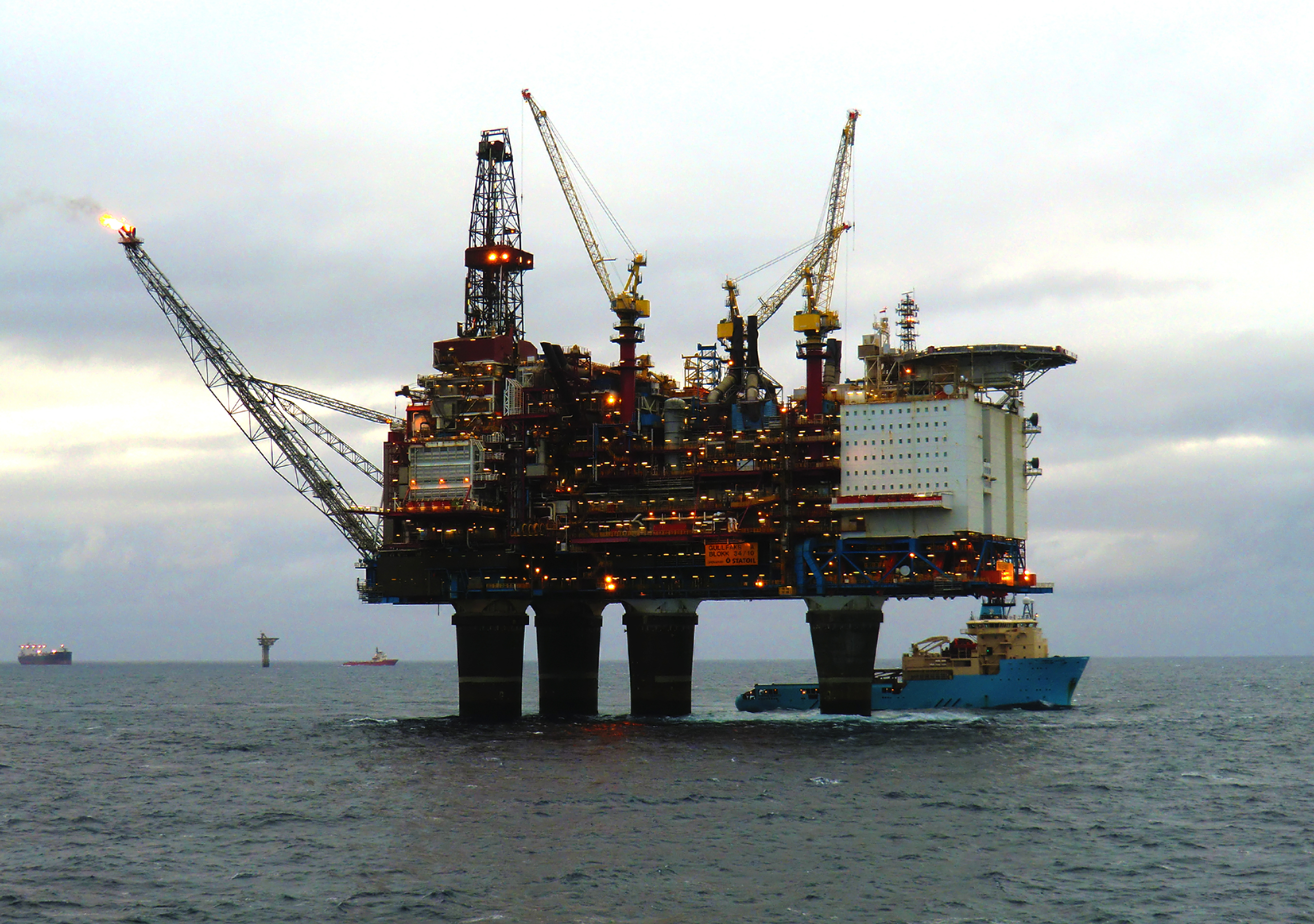
Gullfaks oil field in the North Sea. As petroleum is a non-renewable natural resource, the industry is faced with an inevitable eventual depletion of the world's oil supply.

Many aspects of capitalism have come under attack from the anti-globalization movement, which is primarily opposed to corporate capitalism. Environmentalists and scholars have argued that capitalism requires continual economic growth and that it will inevitably deplete Earth's finite natural resources and cause mass extinctions of animal and plant life. Such critics argue that while neoliberalism, the ideological backbone of contemporary globalized capitalism, has indeed increased global trade, it has also destroyed traditional ways of life, exacerbated inequality, increased global poverty, and that environmental indicators indicate massive environmental degradation since the late 1970s.

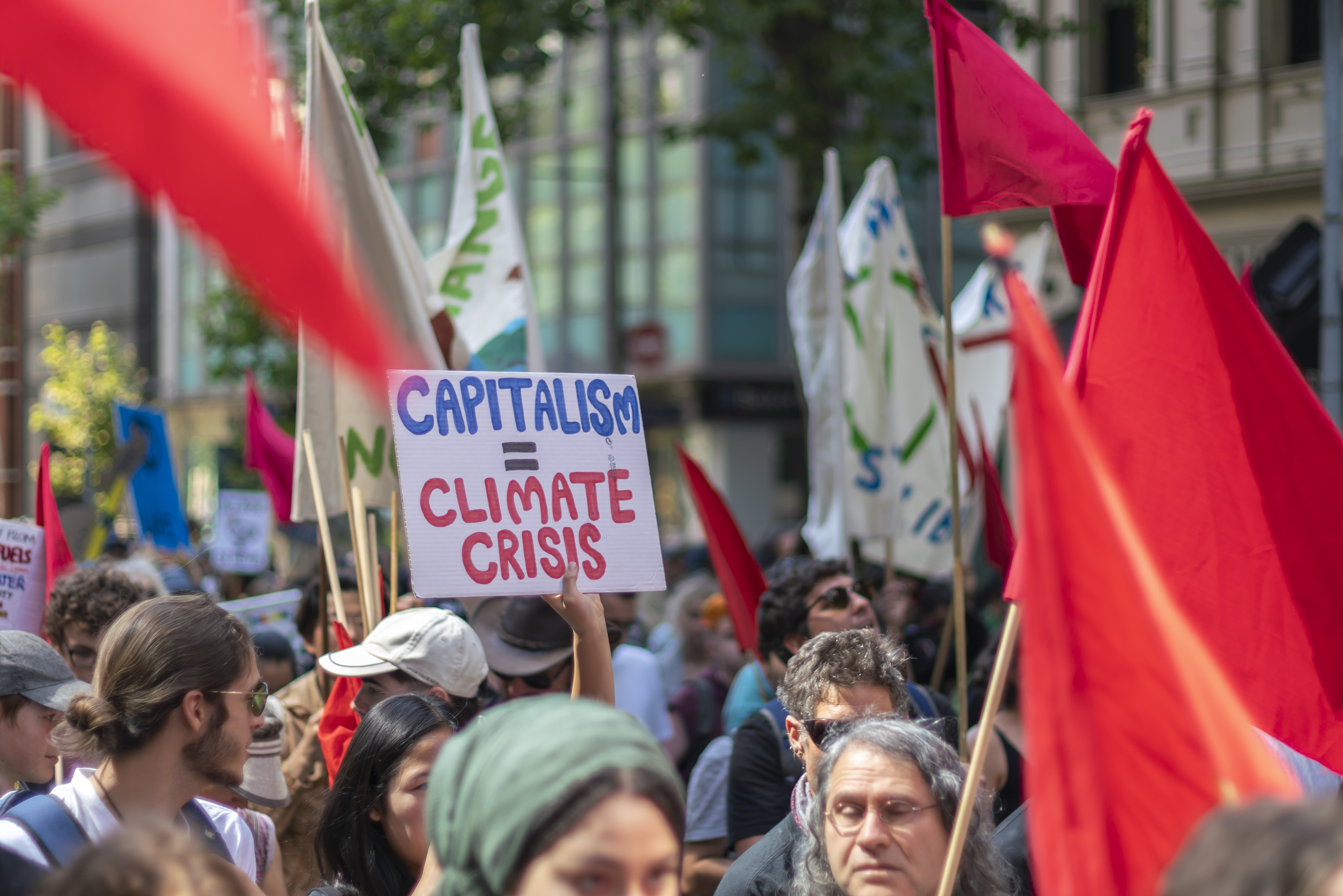
A placard criticising capitalism held by a climate change protester in Australia

Some scholars argue that the capitalist approach to environmental economics does not take into consideration the preservation of natural resources and that capitalism creates three ecological problems: growth, technology, and consumption. The growth problem results from the nature of capitalism, as it focuses around the pursuit of limitless economic growth and the accumulation of capital. The innovation of new technologies has an impact on the environmental future as they serve as a capitalist tool in which environmental technologies can result in the expansion of the system. Consumption is focused around the capital accumulation of commodities and neglects the use-value of production. Professor Radhika Desai, director of the Geopolitical Economy Research Group at the University of Manitoba, contends that ecological crises such as climate change, pollution and biodiversity loss occur when "capitalist firms compete to appropriate and plunder the free resources of nature and when this very appropriation and plunder forces working people to overexploit their ever-shrinking share of these resources."

One of the main modern criticisms of the sustainability of capitalism concerns the so-called commodity chains, or production/consumption chains. These terms refer to the network of transfers of materials and commodities that is currently part of the functioning of the global capitalist system. Examples include high tech commodities produced in countries with low average wages by multinational firms and then being sold in distant high income countries; materials and resources being extracted in some countries, turned into finished products in some others and sold as commodities in further ones; and countries exchanging with each other the same kind of commodities for the sake of consumers' choice (e.g. Europe both exporting and importing cars to and from the United States). According to critics, such processes, all of which produce pollution and waste of resources, are an integral part of the functioning of capitalism (i.e., its "metabolism").

Critics note that the statistical methods used in calculating ecological footprint have been criticized; some find the whole concept of counting how much land is used to be flawed, arguing that there is nothing intrinsically negative about using more land to improve living standards (rejection of the intrinsic value of nature).

Under what anti-capitalists such as Murray Bookchin call the "grow or die" imperative of capitalism, they say there is little reason to expect hazardous consumption and production practices to change promptly. They also claim that markets and states invariably drag their feet on substantive environmental reform and are notoriously slow to adopt viable sustainable technologies. Immanuel Wallerstein, referring to the externalization of costs as the "dirty secret" of capitalism, claims that there are built-in limits to ecological reform and that the costs of doing business in the world capitalist economy are ratcheting upward because of deruralization and democratization.

A team of Finnish scientists hired by the UN Secretary-General to aid the 2019 Global Sustainable Development Report asserts that capitalism as we know it is moribund, primarily because it focuses on short-term profits and fails to look after the long-term needs of people and the environment, which is being subjected to unsustainable exploitation. Their report goes on to link many seemingly disparate contemporary crises to this system, including environmental factors such as global warming and accelerated species extinctions and also societal factors such as rising economic inequality, unemployment, sluggish economic growth, rising debt levels, and impuissant governments unable to deal with these problems. The scientists say a new economic model, one which focuses on sustainability and efficiency and not profit and growth, will be needed as decades of robust economic growth driven by abundant resources and cheap energy are rapidly coming to a close. Another group of scientists contributing to the 2020 "Scientists warning on affluence" argue that a shift away from paradigms fixating on economic growth and the "profit-driven mechanism of prevailing economic systems" will be necessary to mitigate human impacts on the environment, and suggest a range of ideas from the reformist to the radical, with the latter consisting of degrowth, eco-socialism and eco-anarchism.

Some scientists contend that the rise of capitalism, which itself developed out of European imperialism and colonialism of the 15th and 16th centuries, marks the emergence of the Anthropocene epoch, in which human beings started to have significant and mostly negative impacts on the earth system. Others have warned that contemporary global capitalism "requires fundamental changes" to mitigate the worst environmental impacts, including the "abolition of perpetual economic growth, properly pricing externalities, a rapid exit from fossil-fuel use, strict regulation of markets and property acquisition, reining in corporate lobbying, and the empowerment of women". Jason Hickel writes that capitalism creates pressures for population growth: "more people means more labour, cheaper labour, and more consumers." He argues that continued population growth makes the challenge of sustainability even more difficult, but adds that even if the population leveled off, capitalism would get existing consumers to increase their consumption, as consumption rates have always outpaced population growth.

In 2024 a group of experts including Michael E. Mann and Naomi Oreskes published "An urgent call to end the age of destruction and forge a just and sustainable future". They conducted an extensive review of the existing scientific literature on the issue. They blamed the ecological crisis on "imperialism, extractive capitalism, and a surging population". They proposed a paradigm shift that replaces it with a socio-economic model prioritizing sustainability, resilience, justice, kinship with nature, and communal well-being. They described many ways to achieve the transition.

=== Profit motive ===
The majority of criticisms of the profit motive centre on the idea that it encourages selfishness and greed, rather than serving the public good or necessarily increasing net wealth. Critics of the profit motive argue that companies disregard morals or public safety in the pursuit of profits. Capitalist firms seek to reduce spending to increase profits, often at the expense of workers, such as cutting wages, deskilling workers, mechanizing tasks and reducing workers to interchangeable parts, and downsizing, which causes unemployment. The reason the profit motive is harmful is the fundamental contradiction between the interests of capitalists and workers: capitalists want to pay their workers as little as possible and make them work as much as possible to increase profits. In contrast, workers want to be paid fairly and have their increased productivity result in fewer working hours. This fundamental contradiction, critics argue, shows how illogical capitalism is, as it is a system in which two classes have fundamentally opposite interests which create conflict.

Recently, a compelling criticism of unmoderated capitalism has emerged: it prioritizes capital over human well-being, except where human well-being contributes to capital production. Critics argue that such a system tends to reward sociopathic behavior. Consequently, they contend that pure (unmoderated) capitalism is inherently unsuitable as a foundation for society. As pure capitalistic models develop, they foster an increase in sociopathic behavior, which ultimately degrades societal functioning, defined by the well-being of most of its members. The detrimental processes associated with excessive sociopathic behavior include the spread of disinformation, the implementation of policies that create severe economic inequalities, and the manipulation of legal and judicial systems to benefit capital flow without regard for the majority's welfare. In response to this criticism, some advocate for a moderated capitalism that promotes policies valuing human well-being. This approach creates reward structures that are not solely tied to capital. However, one counterargument is that in a global society with diverse economic models, pure capitalism might prevail over moderated capitalism in the long run because it generates more economic power.

=== Comparison to slavery ===
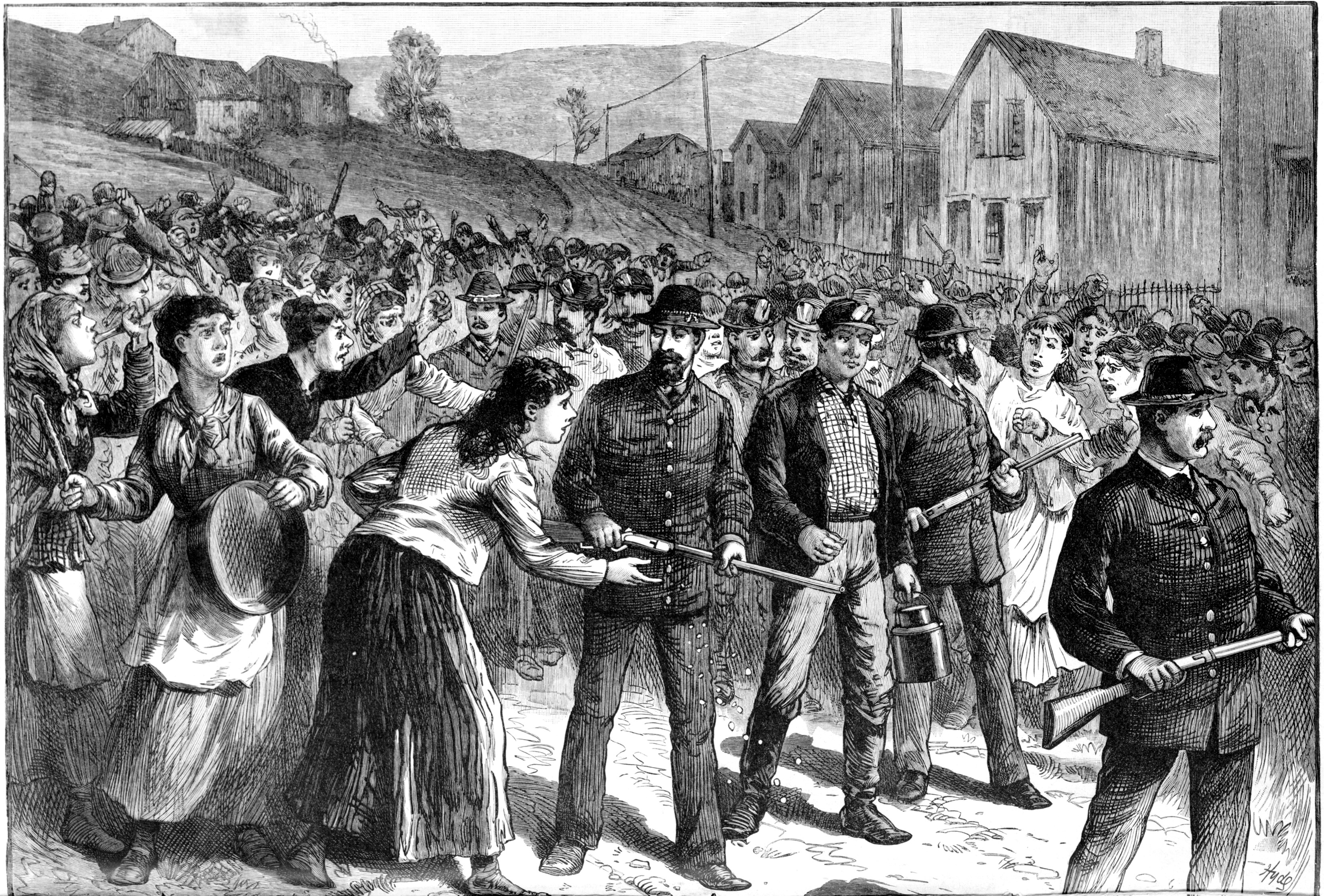
Pinkerton guards escort strikebreakers in Buchtel, Ohio, 1884.

Wage labor has long been compared to slavery. As a result, the phrase "wage slavery" is often utilized as a pejorative for wage labor. Similarly, advocates of slavery looked upon the "comparative evils of Slave Society and of Free Society, of slavery to human Masters and slavery to Capital" and proceeded to argue that wage slavery was actually worse than chattel slavery. Slavery apologists like George Fitzhugh contended that workers only accepted wage labor with the passage of time as they became "familiarised and inattentive to the infected social atmosphere they continually inhale". Scholars have debated the exact relationship between wage labor, slavery, and capitalism at length, especially for the Antebellum South.

With the advent of the Industrial Revolution, thinkers such as Pierre-Joseph Proudhon and Karl Marx elaborated the comparison between wage labor and slavery in the context of a critique of societal property not intended for active personal use while Luddites emphasized the dehumanisation brought about by machines. Before the American Civil War, Southern defenders of African American slavery invoked the concept of wage slavery to favorably compare the condition of their slaves to workers in the North. The United States abolished slavery during the Civil War, but labor union activists found the metaphor useful. According to Lawrence Glickman, in the Gilded Age "references abounded in the labor press, and it is hard to find a speech by a labour leader without the phrase".

The slave, together with his labour-power, was sold to his owner once for all. ... The [wage] labourer, on the other hand, sells his very self, and that by fractions. ... He [belongs] to the capitalist class; and it is for him ... to find a buyer in this capitalist class.

— Karl Marx

According to Noam Chomsky, analysis of the psychological implications of wage slavery goes back to the Enlightenment era. In his 1791 book On the Limits of State Action, liberal thinker Wilhelm von Humboldt explained how "whatever does not spring from a man's free choice, or is only the result of instruction and guidance, does not enter into his very nature; he does not perform it with truly human energies, but merely with mechanical exactness" and so when the laborer works under external control, "we may admire what he does, but we despise what he is". Both the Milgram and Stanford experiments have been found useful in the psychological study of wage-based workplace relations.

Additionally, as per anthropologist David Graeber, the earliest wage labor contracts known were, in fact, contracts for the rental of enslaved people (usually the enslaver would receive a share of the money and the enslaved person another, with which to maintain their living expenses). According to Graeber, such arrangements were quite common in New World slavery as well, whether in the United States or Brazil. C. L. R. James argued in The Black Jacobins that most of the techniques of human organisation employed on factory workers during the Industrial Revolution were first developed on slave plantations.

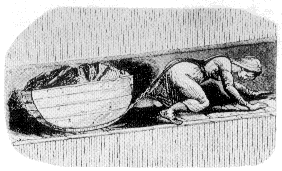
Girl pulling a coal tub in mine, from official report of the British parliamentary commission in the mid-19th century

Some anti-capitalist thinkers claim that the elite maintain wage slavery and a divided working class through their influence over the media and entertainment industry, educational institutions, unjust laws, nationalist and corporate propaganda, pressures and incentives to internalize values serviceable to the power structure, state violence, fear of unemployment and a historical legacy of exploitation and profit accumulation/transfer under prior systems, which shaped the development of economic theory.

Adam Smith noted that employers often conspire together to keep wages low:

The interest of the dealers ... in any particular branch of trade or manufactures, is always in some respects different from, and even opposite to, that of the public ... [They] have generally an interest to deceive and even to oppress the public ... We rarely hear, it has been said, of the combinations of masters, though frequently of those of workmen. But whoever imagines, upon this account, that masters rarely combine, is as ignorant of the world as of the subject. Masters are always and everywhere in a sort of tacit, but constant and uniform combination, not to raise the wages of labor above their actual rate ... It is not, however, difficult to foresee which of the two parties must, upon all ordinary occasions, have the advantage in the dispute, and force the other into a compliance with their terms.

To Marxist and anarchist thinkers like Mikhail Bakunin and Peter Kropotkin, wage slavery was a class condition in place due to the existence of private property and the state. This class situation rested primarily on:

1. The existence of property not intended for active use.
2. The concentration of ownership in a few hands.
3. The lack of direct access by workers to the means of production and consumption goods.
4. The perpetuation of a reserve army of unemployed workers.

For Marxists, labor as commodity, which is how they regard wage labor, provides a fundamental point of attack against capitalism. "It can be persuasively argued", noted one concerned philosopher, "that the conception of the worker's labour as a commodity confirms Marx's stigmatization of the wage system of private capitalism as 'wage-slavery;' that is, as an instrument of the capitalist's for reducing the worker's condition to that of a slave, if not below it". That this objection is fundamental follows immediately from Marx's conclusion that wage labor is the very foundation of capitalism: "Without a class dependent on wages, the moment individuals confront each other as free persons, there can be no production of surplus value; without the production of surplus-value there can be no capitalist production, and hence no capital and no capitalist!".

=== Supply and demand ===
A hypothetical market which cannot be described in the standard theory of supply and demand. The Sonnenschein–Mantel–Debreu theorem implies the existence of such a market.

At least two assumptions are necessary for the validity of the standard model: first, that supply and demand are independent; and second, that supply is "constrained by a fixed resource". If these conditions do not hold, then the Marshallian model cannot be sustained. Sraffa's critique focused on the inconsistency (except in implausible circumstances) of partial equilibrium analysis and the rationale for the upward slope of the supply curve in a market for a produced consumption good. The notability of Sraffa's critique is also demonstrated by Paul A. Samuelson's comments and engagements with it over many years, stating:

What a cleaned-up version of Sraffa (1926) establishes is how nearly empty are all of Marshall's partial equilibrium boxes. To a logical purist of Wittgenstein and Sraffa class, the Marshallian partial equilibrium box of constant cost is even more empty than the box of increasing cost.

Aggregate excess demand in a market is the difference between the quantity demanded and the quantity supplied as a function of price. In the model with an upward-sloping supply curve and a downward-sloping demand curve, the aggregate excess demand function intersects the axis at only one point, namely where the supply and demand curves intersect. The Sonnenschein–Mantel–Debreu theorem shows that the standard model cannot be rigorously derived in general from general equilibrium theory.

The model of prices being determined by supply and demand assumes perfect competition. However, "economists have no adequate model of how individuals and firms adjust prices in a competitive model. If all participants are price-takers by definition, then the actor who adjusts prices to eliminate excess demand is not specified". Goodwin, Nelson, Ackerman and Weisskopf write:

If we mistakenly confuse precision with accuracy, then we might be misled into thinking that an explanation expressed in precise mathematical or graphical terms is somehow more rigorous or useful than one that takes into account particulars of history, institutions or business strategy. This is not the case. Therefore, it is important not to put too much confidence in the apparent precision of supply and demand graphs. Supply and demand analysis is a useful precisely formulated conceptual tool that clever people have devised to help us gain an abstract understanding of a complex world. It does not—nor should it be expected to—give us in addition an accurate and complete description of any particular real world market.

=== Surveillance ===
According to Harvard academic Shoshana Zuboff, a new genus of capitalism, surveillance capitalism monetizes data acquired through surveillance. She states that it was first discovered and consolidated at Google, emerged due to the "coupling of the vast powers of the digital with the radical indifference and intrinsic narcissism of the financial capitalism and its neoliberal vision that have dominated commerce for at least three decades, especially in the Anglo economies" and depends on the global architecture of computer mediation which produces a distributed and largely uncontested new expression of power she calls "Big Other".

New information technologies continuously create conflict between privacy, the control over personal information disclosure, and surveillance. In a current capitalistic society, power is harnessed through a combination of both control and freedom. This fusion of control and freedom, seen through changes in sexuality and race, is a response to the growing privatization of data, networks, public services, and physical spaces, and also to the simultaneous entry of publicity and paranoia into people's lives.

=== Racism ===
According to Immanuel Wallerstein, institutional racism has been "one of the most significant pillars" of the capitalist system and serves as "the ideological justification for the hierarchization of the work-force and its highly unequal distributions of reward". Critics of capitalism argue that racism benefits capitalists in several ways. Racism divides the working class and prevents them from uniting to demand better wages and working conditions. Capitalists benefit from competition and hostility among workers because they reduce workers' bargaining power and ability to organise. Racism was used to justify the exploitation and oppression of certain groups of people for economic gain, such as in the era of slavery in the United States. Capitalists benefitted from the scapegoating of Jewish people as a way to divert attention from the real cause of the problems. An example of this is Henry Ford, founder of the Ford Motor Company, who spread Anti-Semitic propaganda in his newspaper The Dearborn Independent. Vladimir Lenin argued that Antisemitism was being used in Tsarist Russia to distract the workers from the true problems inherent to capitalism by blaming the Jews. Others argue that while capitalism generally uses or transforms pre-existing racism depending on local circumstances, racism is not necessary for capitalism.

Many theorists supportive of capitalism believed that a free market is a remedy for racism in a functioning society, because if some business owners engaged in discriminatory wage practices targeting minority ethnic groups, other entrepreneurs would take advantage of the opportunity to hire an equally capable worker for a lower cost, increasing the profitability of the latter. According to Jim Sidanius and Felicia Pratto, despite the theory's fluidity, reconciling free-market theory with observed data presents challenges, as supporters of free-market capitalism often exhibit a higher likelihood of discriminating against ethnic minorities. Left-wing commentators have argued that capitalism promotes racism alongside culture wars over issues such as immigration and representation of ethnic minorities whilst refusing to address economic inequalities.

=== Underdevelopment ===
Marxist and Neo-Marxist theorists including Wallerstein, Andre Frank and Samir Amin have linked underdevelopment with capitalism, emphasising the relationship between the metropolist centre and the periphery colony, theory of 'unequal exchange' and constituents of a single world capitalist system. Dependency theory posits that peripheral economies are subordinated to the interests of the capitalist world economy which was initially established by European colonialism.

Using the Latin American dependency model, the Guyanese Marxist historian Walter Rodney, in his 1972 book How Europe Underdeveloped Africa, described an Africa that had been consciously exploited by European imperialists, leading directly to the modern underdevelopment of most of the continent.

The concept of uneven development derived from the political theories of Leon Trotsky. This concept was developed in combination with the related theory of permanent revolution to explain the historical context of Russia. He would later elaborate on this theory in 1930 to explain the specific capitalist laws of uneven development. According to biographer Ian Thatcher, this theory would be later generalised to "the entire history of mankind".

=== Problems of Morality ===
Many thinkers and movements in the 20th and 21st centuries have noted how global capitalism in the modern era undermines a sense of morality that extends beyond people's self-interest. Against utilitarian type of thinking, Alasdair MacIntyre argued that social morality in contemporary societies enables little possibilities for virtue ethics, where communities can prioritize robust moral frameworks as guiding principles for social life. MacIntyre identifies the problem in the rise of self-interest and emotivism along with the decline of cohesive traditions. According the Philip Rieff, the combination of capitalist self-interest and modern psychotherapy has led to the priority of individual happiness as the ultimate objective in people lives, instead of being treated as an aspect of communal flourishing.

Despite these challenges, ethnographic work shows that communities in capitalist societies are continuously concerned with morality and try to undercut moral problems, but this often produces new contradictions. Andrea Muehlebach shows that in Italy, the reduction of welfare in the 21st century has been accompanied by a rise of philanthropic activities, through which communities try to redeem a sense of social responsibility and altruism, even if this allows the state to further reduce its accountability for social problems. Gil Hizi, proposing the concept "capitalist virtuousness," shows how people who are concerned about social competition and materialism turn to self-improvement expertise to foster virtues of sincerity, equality, individual autonomy with a vision of a better social world. However, these individuals ultimately must display their individual value in competitive markets, and therefore cannot easily extend their moral ideals across time and space. In this process, morality shifts from a genuine communal commitment to styles and expressions through which people signal their merits.

== Counter-criticism ==
=== Austrian School ===
Austrian School economists have argued that capitalism can organize itself into a complex system without external guidance or a central planning mechanism. Friedrich Hayek considered the phenomenon of self-organisation as underpinning capitalism. Prices serve as a signal as to the urgent and unfulfilled wants of people, and the opportunity to earn profits if successful, or absorb losses if resources are used poorly or left idle, gives entrepreneurs incentive to use their knowledge and resources to satisfy those wants. Thus, the activities of millions of people, each seeking their own interest, are coordinated.

=== Ayn Rand ===
The novelist Ayn Rand advanced moral defenses of laissez-faire capitalism, most notably in her 1957 novel Atlas Shrugged and her 1966 collection of essays Capitalism: The Unknown Ideal. She argued that capitalism should be supported on moral grounds, not just based on practical benefits. Her ideas have had significant influence over conservative and libertarian supporters of capitalism, especially within the American Tea Party movement.

Rand defined capitalism as "a social system based on the recognition of individual rights, including property rights, in which all property is privately owned". According to Rand, the role of government in a capitalist state has three broad categories of proper functions: first, the police "to protect men from criminals"; second, the armed services "to protect men from foreign invaders"; and third, the law courts "to settle disputes among men according to objective laws".

== See also ==
- Almighty dollar
- Anarchism and capitalism
- Anti-globalisation
- Capital in the Anthropocene
- Capital in the Twenty-First Century
- Capitalism: A Love Story
- Capitalocene
- The Corporation
- Civilizing the Economy
- Corporatocracy
- Crisis theory
- Criticisms of corporations
- Critique of work
- Culture of capitalism
- Economic calculation problem
- Economic democracy
- Late capitalism
- Le Livre noir du capitalisme
- Market fundamentalism
- Market socialism
- Mixed economy
- Post-capitalism
- Social criticism
- Social democracy
- Socialism for the rich and capitalism for the poor
- Technological fix § Concerns
- The Big One
- The Theory of the Leisure Class
- This Changes Everything: Capitalism vs. the Climate
- Why Socialism?
