= The Institute for Structural Reforms =

The Institute for Structural Reforms is a non-partisan Israeli independent research institute based in Tel Aviv. The institute was established in 2010 by advocate Shraga Biran as a community interested company. It aims to promote structural reforms in Israel.

== Missions and aims ==
The Institute for Structural Reforms' primary mission is to conduct studies in economic-legal fields, which are related to social problems in Israel and especially to questions of poverty and inequality within the Israeli society. Another aim is to create position papers that will contribute to the Israeli public discussion on these issues by influencing on policy makers in the areas of housing poverty, privatization and inequality.

== Research and projects ==
=== Housing and urban renewal policy ===
The research project studies models of national housing and urban renewal policies in Western countries and their potential to be implemented in Israel. The research aims to contribute to the public discourse on the housing problem in Israel, which derives from a rapid shortage of new apartments from the middle class and the lower middle class in the last 20 years. The study offers an alternative to previous government programs and legislations for urban renewal by removing the bureaucratic obstacles and enabling an economic feasibility for the urban renewal of poor and neglected neighborhoods. According to the model of the Institute for Structural Reforms, giving the tenants grand building rights will help them to accumulate capital and will create affordable housing for a population that will empower the neighborhood. The presumption is that urban renewal combined with a heterogeneous population will improve the housing problem in Israel.

=== The new geopolitics in the Middle East ===
The study aims to examine the impact of the geo-political changes, the dependency of the Great powers and the activity of the U.S. and China in the energy market in the Middle East on the chance to reach a regional stability. The project offers possible trends and scenarios that might result from the geo-political changes in order to contribute to the public contemporary discourse on Israel-China relationships.

=== Social privatization ===
Until the end of the 1970s, economists and political scientists considered Israel's the economic and social policies to be social democratic. In the 1980s, this opinion shifted as Israel's economic and social policy gradually moved towards neo-liberalism. The research on Social Privatization aims to develop the concept of 'Social Privatization' and its implementation in the State of Israel as an alternative to privatizations' policy of the last decades in the country. The study defines Social Privatization as the distribution of state property to the general public in a way that will reduce poverty and social inequality.

=== Structural reform in planning ===
Global trends in the field of national planning are characterized for having two levels: the national level and the regional level. The national level secures the strategic interests of the state alongside the local planning, which addresses immediate needs and challenges on the regional level in cities and neighborhoods. In Israel, the national planning is centralistic and has not changed since the 1920s. The development of a structural reform in planning ought to replace the centralistic planning in Israel.

== Activities ==
- Pilot of urban renewal and economic feasibility of Shalem neighborhood in the southern of Tel-Aviv.
- Presentation of a bill on Urban Renewal and Affordable Housing at the Israeli Parliament.
- An alternative to the State Oil Revenues Management Fund Bill.
