= Cost competitiveness of fuel sources =

Measure of fuel sources in the energy market

The Cost competitiveness of fuel sources is a measure of whether or not particular fuel sources are cost competitive in the energy market, and is a primary factor in determining if a fuel source will be utilized. If a fuel source can be produced and sold lower than the price crude oil is being traded at, including taxes, then it is considered to be a cost competitive fuel source.

"Lazard’s levelized cost of energy (LCOE) is the most commonly used metric for comparing cost competitiveness of fuel sources", according to the Lone Star Fuels Alliance.

== See also ==
- Carbon tax
- Cost of electricity by source
