= Capital in the Anthropocene =

2020 book by Kohei Saito

- 1st edition Japanese cover
- Author: Kohei Saito
- Original title: 人新世の「資本論」
- Translator: Brian Bergstrom
- Language: Japanese
- Subject: Economics
- Publisher: Shueisha
- Publication date: September 17, 2020
- Publication place: Japan
- English publication date: January 9, 2024
- Media type: Print
- Pages: 375
- Awards: Best Asian Books of the Year (2021)
- ISBN: 978-4087211351
- LC Class: PT2428.M47 S35 2020

Capital in the Anthropocene (Japanese: 人新世の「資本論」, romanized: Hitoshinsei no "Shihonron") is a 2020 non-fiction book by Japanese academic Kohei Saito. Drawing from writings on ecology and natural science by Karl Marx, the book presents a Marxist argument for degrowth as a means of mitigating climate change. Capital in the Anthropocene was an unexpected commercial success in Japan, selling over half a million copies.

== Background ==
Kohei Saito is an associate professor of philosophy at the University of Tokyo. He writes on ecology and political economy from a Marxist perspective, attributing the 2008 financial crisis, the climate crisis, and the Fukushima nuclear disaster as influencing his orientation towards a Marxist interpretation of politics. These events prompted him to consider why "in such an affluent society, there are so many people living in poverty, without access to medical care, and unable to make ends meet", and that despite living in an outwardly convenient and prosperous society, "many people feel that there are no good prospects for the future".

Capital in the Anthropocene draws from Marx's unpublished notebooks on ecological research written late in his life, particularly his writing on natural science and the metabolic rift. In these writings, Marx argues that capitalism has created an "irreparable rift in the interdependent process of social metabolism" and examines self-governing agricultural communes that existed in pre-capitalist societies. From this foundation, Saito mounts an argument for degrowth based on Marx's conclusions.

== Synopsis ==
Saito argues that while sustainable growth has become a central organizing principle in global responses to climate change, the expectation of perpetual growth has only exacerbated the climate crisis. He is particularly critical of the Sustainable Development Goals (SDGs), describing them as "the new opium of the masses" in regards to what he believes is the impossibility for the goals to be achieved under a capitalist system. Instead, Saito advocates for degrowth, which he conceives as the slowing of economic activity through the democratic reform of labor and production.

In practical terms, Saito's conception of degrowth involves the end of mass production and mass consumption, decarbonization through shorter working hours, and the prioritization of essential labor such as caregiving. The author argues that capitalism creates artificial scarcity by pursuing profit based on commodity value rather than the usefulness of what is produced, citing the privatization of the commons for purposes of capital accumulation as an example. Saito argues that by returning the commons to a system of social ownership, it is possible to restore abundance and focus on economic activities that are essential for human life.

== Publication history ==
Capital in the Anthropocene was published by Shueisha on September 17, 2020. In 2021, a Korean translation was published under the title 지속 불가능 자본주의 (lit. 'Unsustainable Capitalism'). Marx in the Anthropocene: Towards the Idea of Degrowth Communism, an English-language book that builds on the material published in Capital in the Anthropocene, was published by Cambridge University Press in 2023. An English translation was published under the title Slow Down: The Degrowth Manifesto by Astra House in 2024.

== Reception ==
Capital in the Anthropocene was awarded the 2021 New Book Award by Chuokoron-Shinsha, and was selected as one of the "Best Asian Books of the Year" at the Asia Book Awards in 2021. The book was an unexpected mainstream commercial success in Japan, selling over a quarter million copies by May 2021, and over a half million copies by September 2022. Saito attributes the book's success to its popularity among young people and its coincidental release during the COVID-19 pandemic, stating the widening of the wealth gap that occurred as a result of the COVID-19 recession increased the visibility of social and economic inequality while revealing "how destructive a capitalist society based on excessive production and consumption can be."

The success of Capital in the Anthropocene has been credited with provoking a renewed interest in Marxist thought in Japan, with bookstores reporting an increase in sales in books about Marxism and Saito appearing on NHK's television series 100 Pun de Meicho to present a four-part introduction to Marx's Capital. The book's sequel, Marx in the Anthropocene, accused David Harvey of a "surprising negative reaction to the ecological turn in Marxism" and took issue with Neil Smith's theory of the social production of nature. In turn, Harvey criticised it for abandoning historical materialism in order to rewrite Marx's approach based on narrow textual basis, and thus "reducing the concept of degrowth communism to an empty signifier, an abstract utopian romanticism".
