= Kohei Saito =

Japanese philosopher and historian of economic thought (born 1987)

- 斎藤 幸平
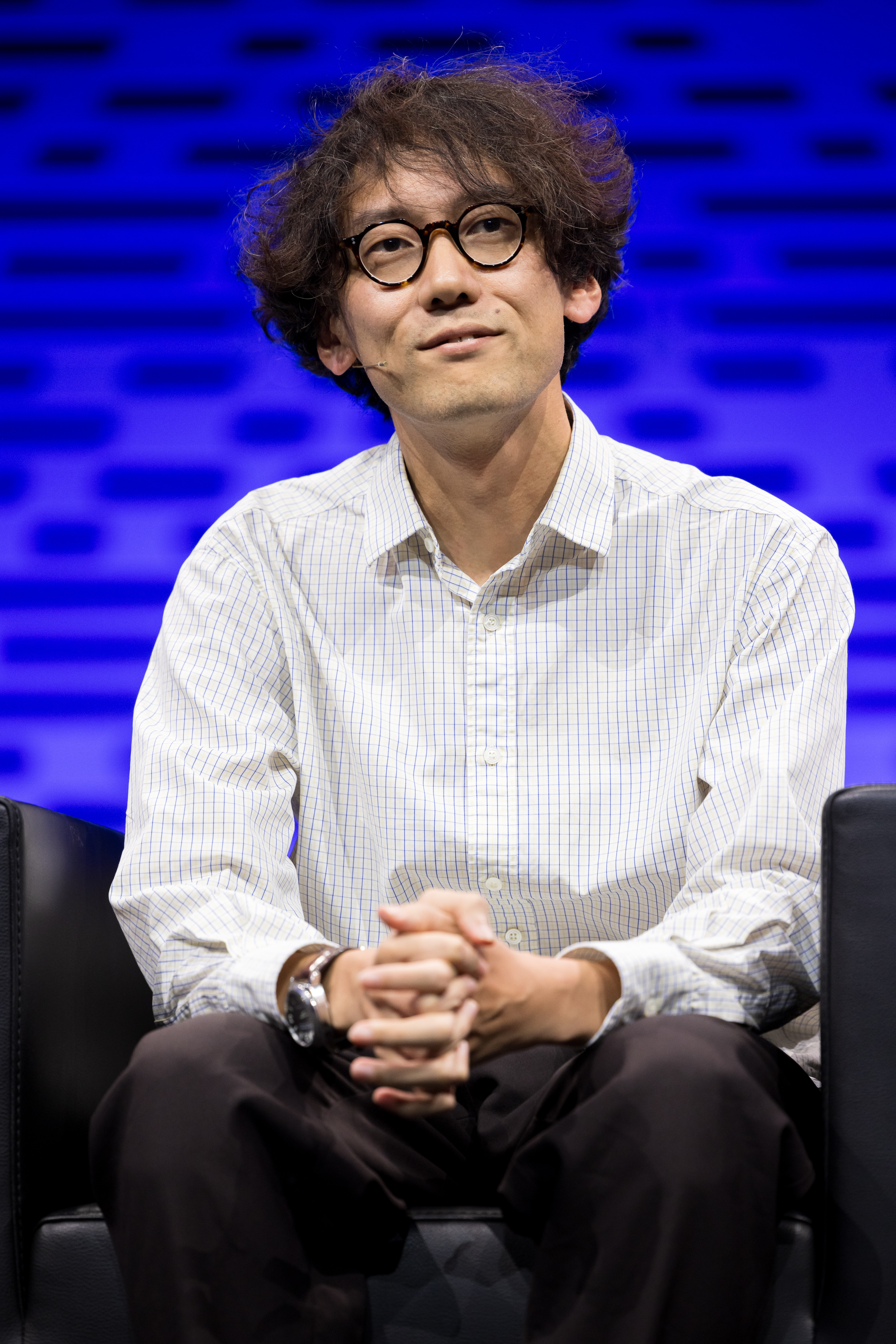
- Saito at the Frankfurt Book Fair in 2024
- Born: January 31, 1987 (age 39)

Education
- Education: University of Tokyo (withdrawal); Wesleyan University (BA); Free University of Berlin (MA); Humboldt University of Berlin (PhD)
- Thesis: Natur gegen Kapital (Nature versus Capital)

Philosophical work
- Era: Contemporary
- Region: Japanese philosophy
- School: Continental; Marxism
- Institutions: Osaka City University; University of Tokyo
- Main interests: Economy; Ecology
- Notable works: Karl Marx's Ecosocialism (2017), Capital in the Anthropocene (2020), Marx in the Anthropocene (2022)

Kohei Saito (斎藤 幸平, Saitō Kōhei) (born January 31, 1987) is a Japanese philosopher. He is an associate professor at the University of Tokyo. Saito works on ecology and political economy from a Marxist perspective. His 2020 book Capital in the Anthropocene has been credited for inspiring a resurgence of interest in Marxist thought in Japan.

== Early life and education ==
Saito graduated from Shiba Junior & Senior High School (芝中学校・芝高等学校), a private school in Tokyo. He then studied at the University of Tokyo for three months before voluntarily withdrawing from the university. He later attended Wesleyan University from 2005 to 2009 as a Freeman Asian Scholarship recipient. In 2009, he began his master's studies at the Free University of Berlin, and in 2012 he switched to Humboldt University of Berlin, where he was enrolled until 2015. Andreas Arndt was his doctoral advisor.

== Career ==
Saito was subsequently a visiting scholar at the University of California, Santa Barbara. In 2016, Saito published the book Nature versus Capital: Marx's Ecology in his Unfinished Critique of Capitalism, which is based on his doctoral dissertation. In it, he reconstructs Karl Marx's ecological critique of capitalism, by drawing on the manuscripts and excerpts from Marx's estate.

Saito co-edited Volume 18 of Division Four of the Marx-Engels-Gesamtausgabe, which was published in 2019. Work on this book had informed his dissertation, which he completed at the Humboldt University of Berlin. In 2017, the English-language version of his book was published. From 2017 to March 2022 he was an associate professor at Osaka City University. He was made an associate professor at the University of Tokyo Graduate School of Arts and Sciences Interdisciplinary Cultural Studies in April 2022.

== Work ==
His 2020 published volume Capital in the Anthropocene became an unexpected bestseller in Japan, selling over 250,000 copies by May 2021, sales of which rose to more than 500,000 by mid-2022. In February 2023, Saito published Marx in the Anthropocene: Towards the Idea of Degrowth Communism, and the English translation of his "degrowth manifesto" was published in 2024.

== Awards ==
In 2018, Saito won the Deutscher Memorial Prize for Marxist Research named after Isaac Deutscher, as the first Japanese and youngest person to receive the award. In 2020, he was awarded the JSPS Prize by the Japan Society for the Promotion of Science for his book Capital in the Anthropocene.

== Publications (selected) ==
- Karl Marx's Ecosocialism: Capital, Nature, and the Unfinished Critique of Political Economy, Monthly Review Press, 2017.
- Capital in the Anthropocene (人新世の「資本論」; Hitoshinsei no Shihonron), Shueisha, 2020.
- Marx in the Anthropocene: Towards the Idea of Degrowth Communism, Cambridge University Press, 2023.
- Slow Down: The Degrowth Manifesto, Penguin Random House, 2024.
- Capital From Zero: Reading Marx in the Age of Climate Catastrophe, Penguin Random House, 2026.

== See also ==
- Capitalocene
