= Energy market =

System enabling the sale and purchase of the physical property used for work

An energy market is a type of international trade market on which electricity, heat, and fuel products are traded. Natural gas and electricity are examples of products traded on an energy market. Other energy commodities include: oil, coal, carbon emissions (greenhouse gases), nuclear power, solar energy and wind energy. Due to the difficulty in storing and transporting energy, current and future energy prices are rarely directly linked. This is because energy purchased at a current price is difficult (or impossible) to store and then sell at a later date. There are two types of market schemes (for pricing): spot market and forward market.

Typically, energy development stems from a government's energy policy which encourages the development of an energy industry specifically in a competitive manner (as opposed to non competitive).

Until the 1970s when energy markets underwent dramatic changes, such markets were characterized by monopoly-based organizational structures. For instance, most of the world's petroleum reserves were controlled by the Seven Sisters. In the case of petroleum energy trade, circumstances then changed considerably in 1973 as the influence of OPEC grew and the repercussions of the 1973 oil crisis affected global energy markets.

== Liberalization and regulation ==
Energy markets have been liberalized in some countries. They are regulated by national and international authorities (including liberalized markets) to protect consumer rights and to avoid oligopolies. Some such regulators include: the Australian Energy Market Commission in Australia, the Energy Market Authority in Singapore, the Energy Community in Europe (which replaced the South-East Europe Regional Energy Market) and the Nordic energy market for Nordic countries. Members of the European Union are required to liberalize their energy markets.

Regulators tend to seek to discourage price volatility, to reform markets (if needed) and to both search for evidence of- and enforce compliance against anti-competitive behavior (such as the formation of an illegal monopoly).

Due to the increase in oil price since 2003 coupled with increased market speculation, energy markets have been reviewed; and, by 2008, several conferences were organized to address the energy market sentiments of petroleum importing nations. In Russia, the markets are being reformed by the introduction of harmonized and all-Russian consumer prices.

== Past energy usage in the United States ==
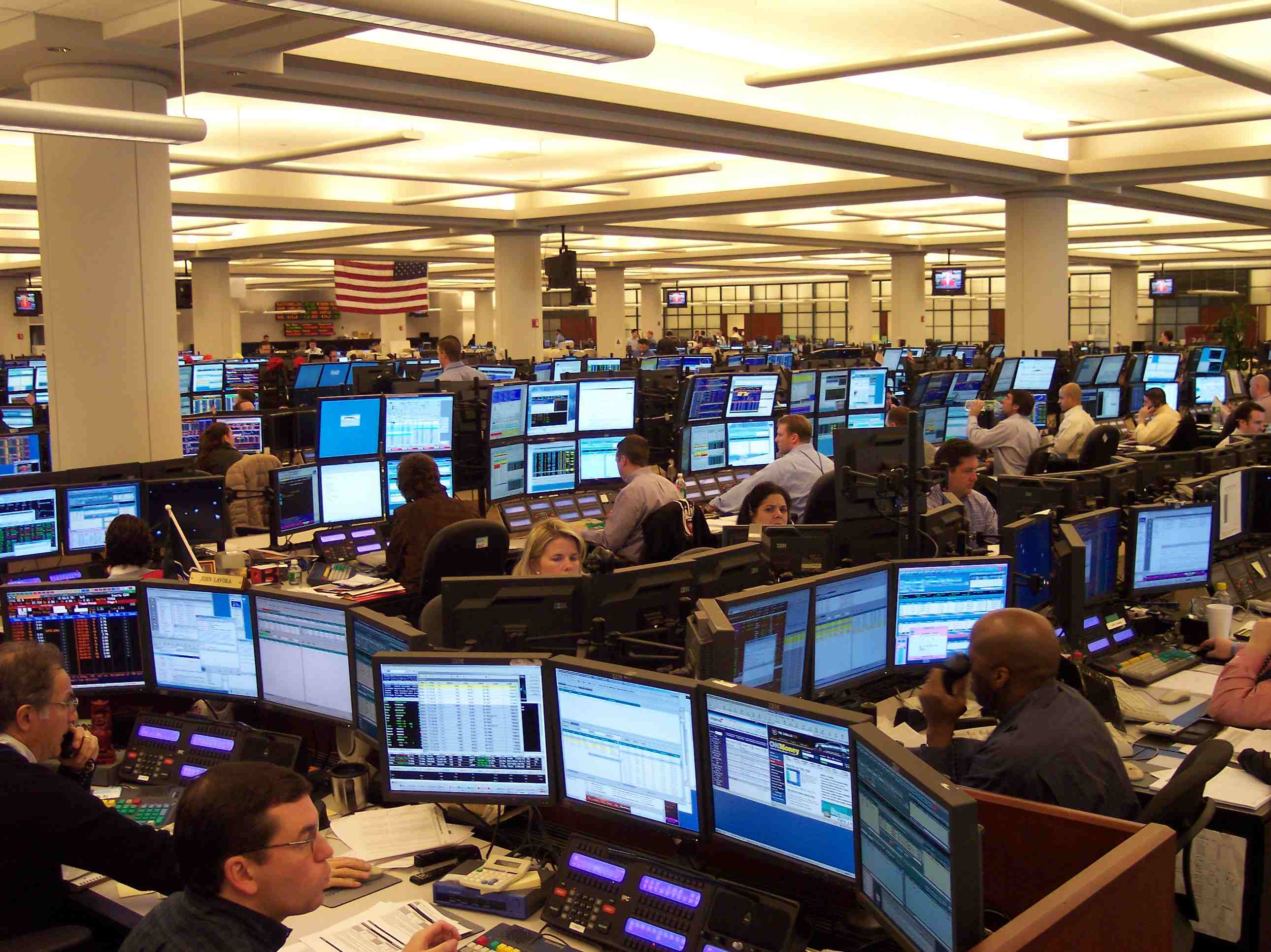
US energy market dealing department, 2004

Around 2010, the United States consumed over four trillion kilowatt-hours (kWh) per year. Data given by the United States Energy Information Administration (EIA) showed a growth in energy usage dating back to 1990, at which time the US consumed around 3 trillion kWh of energy. Traditionally, the United States's energy sources have included oil, coal, nuclear, renewables and natural gas. The breakdown of each of these fuels as a percentage of the overall consumption in the year 1993, per EIA was: coal at 53%, nuclear energy at 19%, natural gas at 13%, renewable energy at 11% and oil at 4% of the overall energy needs. In 2011, the breakdown was: coal at 42%, nuclear at 19%, natural gas at 25%, renewable energy at 13% and oil accounted for 1%. These figures show a drop in energy derived from coal and a significant increase in both natural gas and renewable energy sources.

In 2025, total electricity consumption in the United States was approximately 4.20 trillion kilowatt-hours (kWh). According to the U.S. Energy Information Administration (EIA), the country’s overall energy consumption was primarily supplied by petroleum and natural gas, which account for approximately 37% and 36% of total energy consumption, respectively. Coal, nuclear power, and renewable energy sources each contribute roughly 9%.

== Moving towards renewable energy ==
Since the early 2010s, there has been a movement towards renewable and sustainable energy in the United States. This has been caused by many factors, including consequences of climate change, affordability, government funding, tax incentives and potential profits in the energy market of the United States. According to the most recent projections by the EIA forecasting to the year 2040, the renewable energy industry will grow from providing 13% of the power in the year 2011 to 16% in 2040. This accounts for 32% of the overall growth during the same time period. This growth has been cited as a factor influencing investment trends in the renewable energy sector in the United States.

This movement towards renewable energy has also been affected by the stability of the global market. Recent economic instability in countries in the Middle East and elsewhere has driven American companies to further develop American dependence on foreign sources of energy, such as oil. The long term projections by the EIA for renewable energy capacity in the United States is also sensitive to factors such as the cost and availability of domestic oil and natural gas production.

Countries around the world also face the challenge of up-skilling professionals in order to create the workforce required for the transition from fossil fuel to renewable energy. Organisations such as the Renewable Energy Institute are assisting with this transition, but more is required to meet targets set by governments around the world, including those set by the Paris Agreement.

== Renewable energy sources ==
Currently, the majority of the United States's renewable energy production comes from hydroelectric power, solar power and wind power. According to the U.S. Department of Energy, the cost of wind power doubled between the years of 2002 to 2008. However, since then, the prices of wind power have declined by 33%. Various factors have contributed to the decline in the cost of wind power, such as government subsidies, tax breaks, technological advancement and the cost of oil and natural gas.

Hydroelectric power has been the main source of renewable energy because it has been reliable over time. Nonetheless, there are challenges in hydropower. For example, traditional hydroelectric power required damming rivers and other sources of water. Damming disrupts the environment in and near the water, because the dam necessarily creates a lake at the water source. Other complications may include protests by environmentalists. However, new forms of hydroelectric power that harness wave energy from oceans have been in development in recent years. Although these power sources need further development to become economically viable, they have potential to become significant sources of energy.

In recent years, wind energy and solar energy have made large steps towards significant energy production in the United States. These sources have a small impact on the environment and have a high potential of renewable energy production. Advances in technology, government tax rebates, subsidies, grants, and economic need have all led to large steps towards the usage of sustainable energy production.

== In the US ==
The energy industry is the third-largest industry in the United States. This market is expected to have an investment of over $700 billion over the next two decades according to SelectUSA. Furthermore, there are many federal resources enticing both domestic and foreign companies to develop the industry in the United States. These federal resources include the Department of Energy Loan Guarantee, the American Reinvestment and Recovery Act, the Smart Grid Stimulus Program, as well as an Executive Order on Industrial Energy Efficiency. Harnessing the power of wind, solar and hydroelectric resources in the United States will become the focus of the United States's renewable sources of energy.

== See also ==
- Commodity value
- Cost competitiveness of fuel sources
- Demand destruction
- Energy crisis
- Energy derivative
- Energy intensity
- Energy law
- Food vs. fuel
- Renewable energy commercialization
- Cost of electricity by source
- Spark spread
