= Economic power =

Geopolitical concept

Economic power refers to the ability of countries, businesses or individuals to make decisions on their own that benefit them. Scholars of international relations also refer to the economic power of a country as a factor influencing its power in international relations.

== Definition ==
Economists use several concepts featuring the word power:

- Market power is the ability of a firm to profitably raise the market price of a good or service over marginal cost.
  - Monopoly power is a strong form of market power—the ability to set prices or wages unilaterally. This is the opposite of the situation in a perfectly competitive market in which supply and demand set prices.
- Purchasing power, i.e. the ability of any amount of money to buy goods and services. Those with more assets, or more correctly net worth, have more power of this sort. The greater the liquidity of one's assets, the greater one's purchasing power is. Purchasing power parity is a way of adjusting exchange rate valuations to reflect the actual goods or services that can be purchased for a given amount of currency.
- Corporate power, the landmark of corporate capitalism in which with corporations and large business interest groups have power and influence over government policy, including the policies of regulatory agencies and influencing political campaigns.
- Bargaining power, i.e. the ability of players in a bargaining game to influence the outcome which is the players sharing rule for something (a prize, a cake or access to resources). Information is a contributor to bargaining power. In the case of two agents entering into a contract, if one agent knows that their deal will turn out significantly better, or worse, than the other suspects, then they are exercising a form of informational economic power (see information asymmetry).
- Managerial power, i.e. the ability of managers to threaten their employees with firing or other penalties for not following orders or for not giving in satisfying reports. This exists if there is a cost of job loss, especially due to the existence of unemployment and workers' lack of sufficient assets to survive without working for pay.
- Worker power, i.e. the ability of workers to threaten their managers with resignation for not providing satisfying working conditions. This exists if there is a cost of hiring, especially due to the existence of low unemployment, recruiting costs, or training costs.
- Class power in Marxian political economy refers to a situation under capitalism where a minority (the capitalists) in society controls the means of production and therefore is able to exploit the majority (the workers).
