= Corporate capitalism =

Capitalism dominated by large corporations

In social science and economics, corporate capitalism is a capitalist marketplace characterized by the dominance of hierarchical and bureaucratic corporations.

== Overview ==
In the developed world, corporations dominate the marketplace, comprising 50% or more of all businesses. Those businesses which are not corporations contain the same bureaucratic structure of corporations, but there is usually a sole owner or group of owners who are liable to bankruptcy and criminal charges relating to their business. Corporations have limited liability.

Corporations are usually called public entities or publicly traded entities when parts of their business can be bought in the form of shares on the stock market. This is done as a way of raising capital to finance the investments of the corporation. The shareholders appoint the executives of the corporation, who are the ones running the corporation via a hierarchical chain of power, where the bulk of investor decisions are made at the top and have effects on those beneath them.

== Criticisms ==
Corporate capitalism has been criticized for the amount of power and influence corporations and large business interest groups have over government policy, including the policies of regulatory agencies and influencing political campaigns. Many social scientists have criticized corporations for failing to act in the interests of the people, and their existence seems to circumvent the principles of democracy, which assumes equal power relations between individuals in a society.

Dwight D. Eisenhower criticized the notion of the confluence of corporate power and de facto fascism, but nevertheless brought attention to the "conjunction of an immense military establishment and a large arms industry" (the military–industrial complex) in his 1961 Farewell Address to the Nation, and stressed "the need to maintain balance in and among national programs—balance between the private and the public economy, balance between cost and hoped for advantage".

== See also ==
- Capitalist mode of production
- Capitalist state
- Corporation
- Corporatocracy
- Criticism of capitalism
