= Immiseration thesis =

Marxist theory on wage growth

In Marxist theory and Marxian economics, the immiseration thesis, also referred to as emiseration thesis, is derived from Karl Marx's analysis of economic development in capitalism, implying that the nature of capitalist production stabilizes real wages, reducing wage growth relative to total value creation in the economy. Even if real wages rise, therefore, the overall labor share of income decreases, leading to the increasing power of capital in society.

The immiseration thesis is related to Marx's analysis of the rising organic composition of capital and reduced demand for labor relative to capital equipment as technology develops.

The law of increasing misery (also known as the immiseration thesis) is a concept central to Marxist theory, suggesting that capitalism inherently leads to a decline in the standard of living for the working class, even if wages may technically rise, while simultaneously enriching the capitalist class. This theory posits that the nature of capitalist production, characterized by the increasing exploitation of labor, will ultimately result in a greater concentration of wealth and power in the hands of a smaller, capitalist elite, leaving the working class increasingly impoverished.

== Karl Marx ==
In Karl Marx's early writings of the 1840s, he was influenced by David Ricardo's theory of wages, which held that wages tended down to a subsistence minimum. As he wrote with Friedrich Engels in the Communist Manifesto (1848), "the average price of wage-labour is the minimum wage. i.e. that quantum of the means of subsistence, which is absolutely requisite to keep the labourer in bare existence as a labourer." This was the "iron law of wages" coined by the socialist Ferdinand Lassalle. Moreover, as he added in On the Question of Free Trade (1847), "as means are constantly being found for the maintenance of labor on cheaper and more wretched food, the minimum of wages is constantly sinking."

Under certain conditions, the "iron law" could therefore imply an absolute decline in living standards. However, Marx moved away from this position in the 1850s, and there is no trace of it in his mature economics writings. In Capital, he argued that there was a "historical and moral component" to wages, and that the "value of labour-power.... differs according to climate and the level of social development," depending "not only on the physical needs but also on historically-developed social needs."

This increase in real wages could nevertheless be accompanied by decrease in the labor share, and an increase in the power of the capitalist class. A Marx had recognized as early as Wage Labour and Capital (1847): "If capital grows rapidly, wages may rise, but the profit of capital rises disproportionately faster. The material position of the worker has improved, but at the cost of his social position. The social chasm that separates him from the capitalist has widened." In Chapter 25 of the first volume of Capital (1867), Marx therefore suggested a relative immiseration of workers vis-à-vis capital occurred. Concerning the evolution of the worker's conditions, he wrote:

Within the capitalist system all methods for raising the social productivity of labour are put into effect at the cost of the individual worker [...] All means for the development of production undergo a dialectical inversion so that they become a means of domination and exploitation of the producers; they distort the worker into a fragment of a man, they degrade him to the level of an appendage of a machine, they destroy the actual content of his labour by turning it into a torment, they alienate from him the intellectual potentialities of the labour process [...], they transform his life into working-time, and drag his wife and child beneath the wheels of the juggernaut of capital. But all methods of the production of surplus-value are at the same time methods of accumulation, and every extension of accumulation becomes, conversely, a means for the development of these methods. It follows therefore that in proportion as capital accumulates, the situation of the worker, be his payment high or low, must grow worse [emphasis added]. [...] Accumulation of wealth at one pole is, therefore, at the same time accumulation of misery, the torment of labour, slavery, ignorance, brutalization and moral degradation at the opposite pole, i.e. on the side of the class that produces its own product as capital. Text on Wikisource

— Karl Marx, Capital: A Critique of Political Economy (1867)

Marx argued that, in accordance with the labour theory of value, capitalist competition would necessitate the gradual replacement of workers with machines, allowing an increase in productivity, but with less overall value for each product produced, as more products can be made in a given amount of time. This process forms part of the general law of capitalist accumulation, in which the proportion of "constant capital" increases relative to "variable capital" (i.e. workers) in the production process over time. Marx also noted that this movement is not merely an abstract relation, but that it is a result of class struggle, and it could be temporarily stopped should wages dip below an amount that the proletariat deem acceptable.

== Subsequent views ==
=== Frankfurt School ===
The immiseration thesis was equally questioned by later theorists, notably by early members of the Frankfurt School. For Theodor Adorno and Max Horkheimer, state intervention in the economy had effectively abolished the tension in capitalism between the "relations of production" and "material productive forces of society"—a tension which, according to traditional Marxist theory, constituted the primary contradiction within capitalism. The previously "free" market (as an "unconscious" mechanism for the distribution of goods) and "irrevocable" private property of Marx's epoch have gradually been replaced by the centralized state planning and socialized ownership of the means of production in contemporary Western societies. The dialectic through which Marx predicted the emancipation of modern society is thus suppressed, effectively being subjugated to a positivist rationality of domination: "[G]one are the objective laws of the market which ruled in the actions of the entrepreneurs and tended toward catastrophe. Instead the conscious decision of the managing directors executes as results (which are more obligatory than the blindest price-mechanisms) the old law of value and hence the destiny of capitalism."

=== Rising standard of living ===
Raymond Geuss asks: "What if capitalism came to be capable of raising the standard of living of the workers rather than further depressing it? A trade union consciousness could then establish itself that was not inherently and irrevocably revolutionary, one that was itself, as Lenin claimed, a form of bourgeois ideology, that is, a form of consciousness that was itself a means through which the bourgeoisie could extend and solidify its domination over the working class." The framing of this question by Geuss is anticipated in Rosa Luxemburg's Accumulation of Capital and in the sensibility of the Frankfurt School an institution whose raison d'etre, in part, was to figure out why the working class voted against its own rational self-interest or (more concretely) why fascism was often preferred to communism by the working poor.

The law of increasing misery highlights the potential for the working poor to adopt concrete, alienated, and materialist time. Standards of living are also manipulated by the fascist cubic unit which is a temporal and physical unit founded in the exchange of Western financial instruments, driving spontaneous communication between class types towards solely reproduce class, where fascism dictates social etiquette.

== See also ==
- Capitalist mode of production (Marxist theory)
- Crisis theory
- Critique of political economy
- Technological unemployment
- Unfree labour
- Wage labour
- Wage slavery
