= Civilizing the Economy =

Economics book

Civilizing the Economy: A New Economics of Provision
- Author: Marvin T. Brown
- Language: English
- Subject: Economics, Ethics, Adam Smith, Slavery
- Publisher: Cambridge University Press
- Publication date: 2010
- Media type: Paperback
- Pages: 282
- ISBN: 978-1408520307
- OCLC: 496958992

Civilizing the Economy: A New Economics of Provision is a book on the role of the economy in social relations by Marvin Brown, published in 2010. Civilizing the Economy exposes the role of the Atlantic slave trade in early capitalism. In place of Adam Smith's myth of the invisible hand, Brown focuses on the slave owner's hands that created the wealth that Smith enjoyed. He then proposes a new framework that places the economy within the context of social relations, and demonstrates how we can transform social systems into an economy that provides for all.

== Synopsis ==
Civilizing the Economy critically examines the historical roots and ethical implications of modern capitalism, drawing attention to its entwinement with the Atlantic slave trade. Brown challenges the conventional economic narratives, especially those rooted in Adam Smith's idea of the 'invisible hand', by highlighting the significant, yet often ignored, role of slavery in the formation of wealth during the early stages of capitalism.

Brown critiques the Smithian economics of property, which prioritizes wealth accumulation and property rights. He advocates for a paradigm shift towards what he describes as economics of household management. This approach emphasizes the provision of goods and services for the collective welfare, advocating for an economy that serves all members of society rather than focusing solely on property accumulation.

Brown further explores the 'economics of dissociation', a concept he introduces to describe the disconnection between the prosperity of a minority and the hardship of the majority. He traces the origin of this economic dissociation to the early phases of capitalism and argues for a more interconnected and responsible economic system.

The book proposes a new framework for the global economy, one that reframes its purpose from the accumulation of property to the making of provisions. Brown suggests that such a framework would lead to a more just and sustainable world, as it would prioritize civic engagement and inclusivity in economic processes.

Brown's proposal includes the development of systems of provision that are both just and sustainable, with a particular emphasis on the separation of finance from the 'real' economy. He argues that this separation is a core issue in modern economics, leading to conflicts between banks and governments. Brown's vision is for an economy that is deeply embedded within a civic agenda, balancing economic demands with civic responsibilities and limitations.

== Reception ==
While Civilizing the Economy has been praised for its innovative approach, critics have raised concerns about its feasibility in practical application. For instance, the emphasis on shifting from a property-based economic system to one focused on provisions has been debated in terms of its practicality and potential impact on the existing economic structures. One of the notable criticisms comes from Heidi Garrett-Peltier, who, in her review in the journal Peace Review, remarks, "The book offers a model for discussion... It does not provide practical solutions for how to transition from our current economic paradigm to one based on a different value system. In this respect, Brown leaves the reader yearning for more".

== See also ==
- Business ethics
- Neoclassical economics
- New Economy Coalition
- Adam Smith
- Political economy
