= Commodity value =

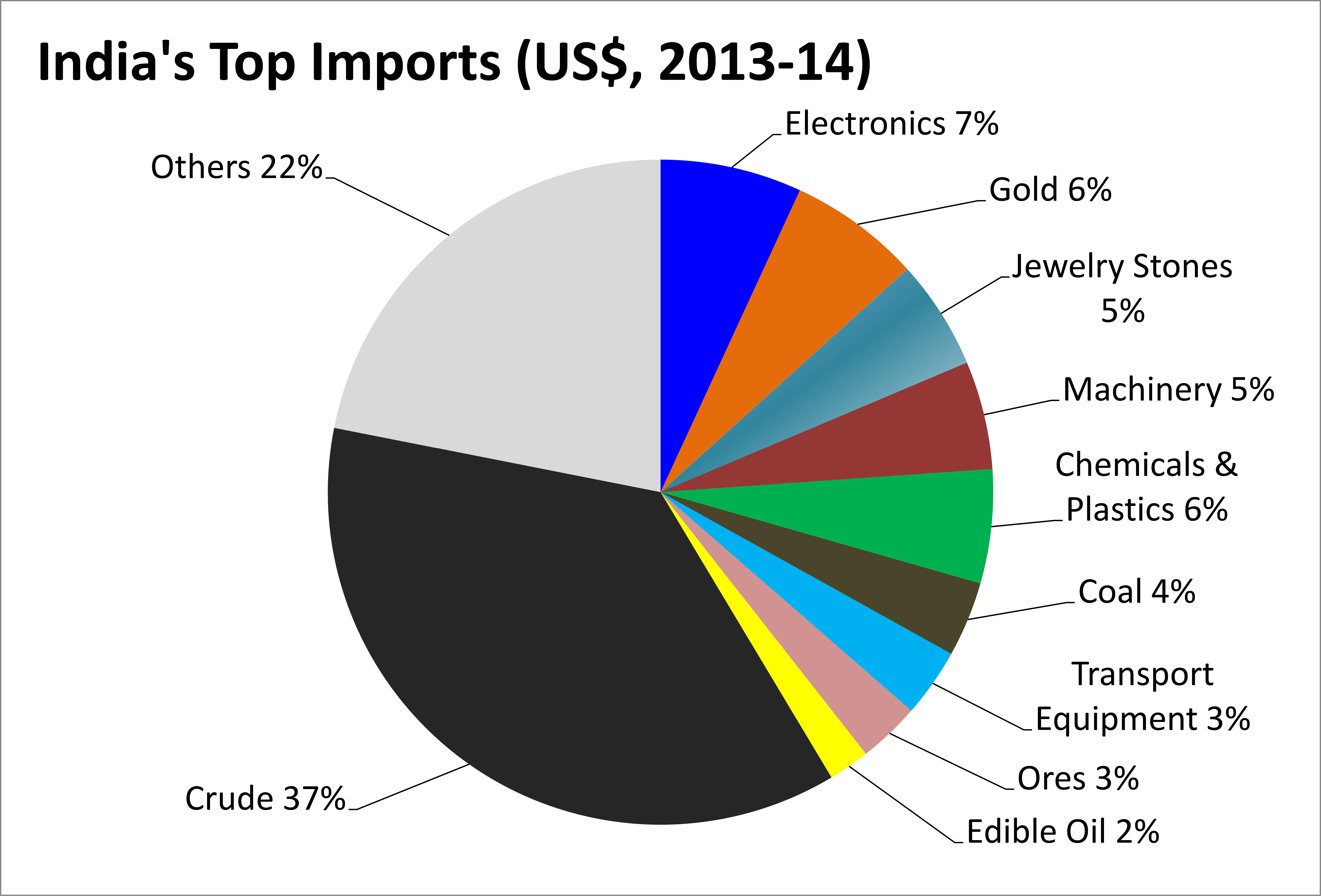
Indian commodity imports in US$

In the field of economics, the commodity value of a good is its free market value under optimal use conditions. In a free market, the commodity value of a good will be reflected by its price.

== Example ==
If an acre of land can yield a net of 100 dollars loss by lying fallow, 50 dollars gain by being planted with corn, and 100 dollars gain by being planted with wheat, then that acre's commodity value is 100 dollars; the farmer is assumed to put his land to best use. The price of a commodity fluctuates around its commodity value.

== Currency ==
A commodity value expressed as a price is determined by historical, social and cultural aspects of production and distribution. Karl Marx described price as the money-name for the labour realised in a commodity. A commodity value is dependent on its utility.

Because money becomes valuable not due to its substance, that is, its commodity value, but rather because of its performance, currencies tend to become token.

== See also ==
- Commodity market
- Gold as an investment
