= Progressive International =

Left-wing international organization

- Abbreviation: PI
- General Secretary: David R. K. Adler; Varsha Gandikota-Nellutla
- Founder: Democracy in Europe Movement 2025; Sanders Institute; Yanis Varoufakis; Bernie Sanders
- Founded: November 30, 2018 (Inaugurated); May 11, 2020 (Official)
- Newspaper: The Internationalist; Wire
- Ideology: Progressivism; Internationalism; Anti-imperialism; Anti-capitalism; Socialism; Anti-Zionism
- Political position: Left-wing to far-left
- Colors: red and black
- Slogan: Internationalism or Extinction
- Purpose: To unite, organize, and mobilize progressive forces around the world
- Region served: Worldwide
- Related organizations: Hague Group

Website
- progressive.international

Progressive International (PI) is a left-wing political international with over 70 member groups, including trade unions, political parties, peasant organisations, and social movements. It has been described as a "worldwide anti-capitalist organization." The organization was founded by the Democracy in Europe Movement 2025 and the Sanders Institute through an inauguration in 2018 before officially launching in May 2020.

== Origins ==
The Progressive International was formally inaugurated in November 2018 via an open call by the Democracy in Europe Movement (DiEM25) and the Sanders Institute and launched in May 2020 for progressive forces to form a unified front. The open call echoed two twinned appeals which were published in 2018 by U.S. Senator Bernie Sanders and former Greek minister of finance Yanis Varoufakis to form an international movement to combat the rise of authoritarianism represented by U.S. President Donald Trump.

The founding was supported by a council of over 40 advisors including Ece Temelkuran, Katrín Jakobsdóttir, Yanis Varoufakis, Carola Rackete, Nick Estes, Vanessa Nakate, Noam Chomsky, Arundhati Roy, Naomi Klein, Niki Ashton, Rafael Correa, Fernando Haddad, Celso Amorim, and Alvaro Garcia Linera.

The International claims to counter what it calls the resurgence of authoritarian nationalism worldwide as well as the rise of disaster capitalism. As its mission, the Progressive International aims to "unite, organize and mobilize the world's progressive forces."

== Governance ==
The Progressive International is guided by an advisory Council that sets the organisation's political and strategic direction. The Secretariat, which includes translators, web developers, graphic designers, policy analysts, and community organisers oversees the day-to-day organisational operations, separated into several thematic areas: Movement, Blueprint, Wire, and Observatory.

The Cabinet serves as the main executive organ responsible for development, planning, and staffing decisions. The Cabinet draws its membership from the other two bodies, consisting of eight Council members: Srećko Horvat, Aruna Roy, Pierre Sané, Fatima Diallo, Rachmi Hertanti, Julian Aguon, Renata Ávila and Scott Ludlum, as well as general coordinators David Adler and Varsha Gandikota-Nellutla.

== Activities and projects ==
=== Observatory ===
In October 2020, Progressive International said that it was "particularly concerned about the integrity of the presidential elections in Bolivia" and sent an observer group made up of Members of Parliament from around Europe to observe the election.

On 15 November 2021, the Progressive International launched their global observatory "as attacks on democracy escalate across the world" and "authoritarian leaders are getting organised to capture the courts, criminalise opposition, and rig the rules to hold onto power," said General Coordinator David Adler in a statement.

The founding was endorsed by Noam Chomsky, Rafael Correa, Ertuğrul Kürkçü, Guillaume Long, Celso Amorim, Fernando Haddad, Jeremy Corbyn, Aruna Roy, Aída García-Naranjo and Andrés Arauz according to the Brazilian daily paper Folha de S.Paulo. The same article included a statement from Adler which singled out Narendra Modi in India and Jair Bolsonaro in Brazil as being part of a wider network of authoritarian threats.

=== Belmarsh Tribunal ===
On 2 October 2020, Progressive International launched the Belmarsh Tribunal to convene groups of legal experts and Julian Assange supporters. In the first year guests included Lula da Silva, Srećko Horvat, M.I.A. and Slavoj Žižek. The hearings claimed that the charges against Assange were an "ongoing attack on press freedom." The tribunal was modeled after the 1966 Russell–Sartre Tribunal, which investigated American involvement in the Vietnam War. In 2022, the third tribunal, which took place at the People's Forum in New York City, coincided with the 20th anniversary of the establishment of the Guantanamo Bay detention camp. Jeremy Corbyn and the Peace & Justice Project participated in the 4th Belmarsh Tribunal in Washington, D.C., in 2023.

Number	Date	Location	Live-stream recording links published on YouTube
1	2 October 2020	Remote	The Belmarsh Tribunal (2020)
2	22 October 2021	London	The Belmarsh Tribunal: Free Julian Assange (2021) presented by Novara Media
3	25 February 2022	New York City	The Belmarsh Tribunal (2022) presented by The People's Forum
4	20 January 2023	Washington, D.C.	The Belmarsh Tribunal D.C. (2023) presented by Democracy Now!
5	4 March 2023	Sydney	The Belmarsh Tribunal Sydney (2023)

== Positions ==
=== Blockade of Cuba ===
The Progressive International has been critical of the United States embargo against Cuba. Progressive International is an organizer of the Nuestra América Flotilla, which will attempt to break the US blockade and provide humanitarian aid to Cuba during the 2026 Cuban crisis.

=== Russian invasion of Ukraine ===
On 4 March 2022, the Cabinet of the Progressive International issued a statement denouncing the Russian invasion of Ukraine, and calling for an "immediate diplomatic solution" and for the dismantlement of NATO. On 9 March 2022, Progressive International organised their first Forum for Peace, in response to the "brutal invasion of Ukraine" and its escalation "toward intercontinental war."

On 13 May 2022 a joint press conference hosted by Jeremy Corbyn, Ece Temelkuran and Yanis Varoufakis on behalf of the Progressive International, DiEM25, and MeRA25, presented the Athens Declaration, which stated: "The war on Ukraine calls for support for victims of war and a new non-aligned movement." The statement demanded an immediate ceasefire and respect for international law, and opposed "military blocs" and what it called "a New Cold War."

=== Gaza war ===
The Progressive International has been critical of the Gaza war and characterizes Israel's actions in Gaza as a genocide. In early 2025, it prompted the creation of the Hague Group, an alliance of states with the aim of upholding international humanitarian law; the group hosted an emergency conference in July 2025 to take concrete measures in order to stop the genocide.

=== China ===
On September 4, 2024, Council members of the Progressive International published a collective statement opposing the "Cold War" against China by the United States.

=== Iran ===
The Cabinet of the Progressive International denounced Israel's bombing of Iran in June 2026, stating "A war on Iran threatens to have catastrophic consequences for the peoples of the region — and the world."

== Members ==
Progressive International is made up of member organizations that are political parties or movements. Member media organizations participate in the wire service.

=== Political parties ===
Country	Party/Organization	Abbreviation	National Legislatures	Government	Ideology	Notes
Afghanistan	Solidarity Party of Afghanistan	SPA	0 / 30	Extra-parliamentary opposition	Social democracy, Democratic socialism, Secularism	After the Fall of Kabul on August 15, 2021, the Taliban took de facto control of Afghanistan and banned all other political opposition parties and groups.
Albania	Lëvizja Bashkë (The Together Movement)	LB	1 / 140	In opposition	Social democracy, Democratic socialism	
Colombia	Todos Somos Colombia	TSC	0 / 188 0 / 108	Extra-parliamentary opposition	Social democracy	Member of the Frente Amplio Unitario
Costa Rica	Broad Front (Frente Amplio)	FA	6 / 57	In opposition	Democratic socialism, Socialism of the 21st century	
Greece	European Realistic Disobedience Front	MeRA25	0 / 300	Extra-parliamentary opposition	Democratic socialism, Syndicalism, Anti-neoliberalism	
Guatemala	Semilla Movement	MS	23 / 160	In government	Social democracy, Anti-corruption	
Honduras	Liberty and Refoundation	Libre	35 / 128	In opposition	Socialism of the 21st century, Democratic socialism	Affiliated with the Savior Party of Honduras and the Christian Democratic Party of Honduras in the National Congress of Honduras.
Kenya	Communist Party Marxist – Kenya	CPMK	0 / 67 0 / 349	Extra-parliamentary opposition	Marxism–Leninism, Pan-Africanism	
Namibia	Landless People's Movement	LPM	6 / 42 4 / 104	In opposition	Social democracy, Democratic socialism, Land reform	In government in the regions of ǁKharas and Hardap.
Nigeria	African Action Congress	AAC	0 / 109 0 / 360 0 / 36	Extra-parliamentary opposition	Eco-socialism, Pan-Africanism	Membership is part of the Coalition for Revolution (CORE).
Pakistan	Haqooq-e-Khalq Party	HKP	0 / 104 0 / 342	Extra-parliamentary opposition	Trotskyism, Communism	Progressive pro-democracy movement.
Serbia	Green–Left Front	ZLF	0 / 250	Extra-parliamentary opposition	Green politics, Participatory democracy, Cooperativism	Direct successor of Don't Let Belgrade Drown. Supported the Student List in the 2026 Serbian elections.
Slovenia	The Left	Levica	5 / 90	In opposition	Democratic socialism, Eco-socialism, Anti-imperialism	From 2022 to 2026 in coalition with Freedom Movement and Social Democrats.
Spain	Catalunya en Comú	CatComú	0 / 264 6 / 350	In coalition	Left-wing populism, Green politics	In coalition with Sumar in the Cortes Generales.
Switzerland	ForumAlternativo	FA	0 / 140	Extra-parliamentary opposition	Democratic socialism, Eco-socialism, Marxism	
Tanzania	Alliance for Change and Transparency	ACT–Wazalendo	4 / 81 4 / 393	In opposition	Democratic socialism	
Turkey	Socialist Refoundation Party	SYKP	0 / 600	Extra-parliamentary opposition	Marxism–Leninism, Socialist feminism	Affiliated with the Peoples' Democratic Congress.
European Union	Democracy in Europe Movement 2025	DiEM25	0 / 705 18 / 9,874 1 / 2,714	Extra-parliamentary opposition	Democratic socialism, Alter-globalization	

=== Movements ===
Country	Party/Organization	Abbreviation	Ideology	Notes
Argentina	Central de Trabajadoras y Trabajadores de la Argentina	CTA-T	Kichnerism	Trade union organization
Argentina	Trabajadores Unidos por la Tierra		Self-managed economy; Agricultural cooperativism	Rural agricultural organization
Bangladesh	National Garment Workers’ Federation	NGWF	Laborism; Feminism	Trade union federation of garment workers in Bangladesh
Bolivia	Wiphalas por el Mundo (Wiphalas Across the World)		Democratic socialism; Revolutionary socialism; Anti-imperialism	Wiphala organization
Brazil	Central Única dos Trabalhadores	CUT	Democratic socialism; Class struggle	Main trade union federation in Brazil
Brazil	Federação Única dos Petroleiros (Federation of Petroleum Workers)	FUP	Laborism; Class struggle	Petrol workers union
Brazil	Movimento dos Trabalhadores Sem-Teto (Movement of Homeless Workers)	MTST	Right to housing	Housing rights organization
Canada	Common Frontiers		Laborism; Internationalism	Multi-sectorial national working group
Chile	Ukamau			Housing rights organization
Colombia	People's Congress		Left-wing nationalism; Indigenismo	Social and political movement based in Colombia
Colombia	Unión Sindical Obrera de la Industria del Petróleo	USO		Oil workers union
Dominican Republic	Instituto de Desarrollo de la Economía Asociativa	IDEAC	Workers' self-management; Buen vivir	Non-profit organization
El Salvador	Federación de Cooperativas de la Reforma Agraria de la Región Central	FECORACEN		Peasants and Indigenous community organization
France	ReAct Transnational		Laborism	Labor NGO
Guatemala	Guatemalan Trade Union, Indigenous and Farmer Movement	MSICG	Democratic socialism	Trade union center
Honduras	Luchemos		Feminism	Feminist organization, associated with Libre
India	Andhra Pradesh Vyvasaya Vruthidarula Union	APVVU	Alter-globalization; Anti-market	Union federation of rural informal workers
India	Mazdoor Kisan Shakti Sangathan (Association for the Empowerment of Labourers and Farmers)		Participatory democracy; Working class interests	Non-profit organization focused on right to information and employment
India	National Alliance of People's Movements	NAPM	Alter-globalization	Alliance of progressive social movements in India
India	Telangana Gig and Platforms Workers Union	TGPWU		Workers union in Telangana
Indonesia	Aksi Ekologi & Emansipasi Rakyat	AEER	Environmentalism; Economic democracy	Environmentalist collective of Indonesian researchers and activists
Italy	Officine Civiche		Participatory democracy; Eco-socialism	Social justice organization based in Ciampino, Italy
Kenya	Mathare Social Justice Centre		Participatory democracy; Peasant interests	Community organization in Mathare, Nairobi
Malaysia	Imagined Malaysia		Post-capitalism	Non-profit history organization
Mexico	Collective Movement for the Arts and Culture of Mexico	MOCCAM	Artivism	Collective of arts and culture workers
Namibia	Namibian Domestic and Allied Workers Union	NDAWU	Laborism; Feminism	Domestic workers' union
Nigeria	BAOBAB for Women’s Human Rights	BAOBAB	Feminism	Women's rights NGO
Pakistan	Pakistan Kissan Rabita Committee	PKRC	Land reform	Network of peasant organisations in Pakistan, member of La Via Campesina
Pakistan	Women Democratic Front	WDF	Socialist feminism	Socialist-feminist organization
Poland	Akcja Socjalistyczna (Socialist Action)	AS	Democratic socialism	Socialist organization
Democratic Republic of Congo	Congolese Solidarity Campaign	CSC	Lumumbism; Anti-Imperialism; Democratic socialism	Solidarity organization founded by Congolese refugees in South Africa with Abahlali baseMjondolo
Sahrawi Republic	Sahrawi Youth Union	UJSARIO	Sahrawi nationalism	Youth wing of the Polisario Front
Senegal	Centre for Research and Action on Economic, Social and Cultural Rights	CRADESC		Think-tank and advocacy framework in Francophone West Africa and the Sahel
Spain	Boza Sur		Migrant rights	Migrant rights organization
Spain	Fridays For Future Salamanca		Environmentalism	Environmental activist organization
South Africa	Abahlali baseMjondolo (the residents of the shacks)	AbM	Radical democracy; Anti-xenophobia; Socialism	Shack dweller's organisation
Sudan	Sudanese Professionals Association	SPA	Labor rights; Anti-corruption	Association of Sudanese trade unions
Tanzania	Mtandao wa Vikundi vya Wakulima Tanzania (National Network of Small-Scale Farmers Groups in Tanzania)	MVIWATA		Farmers organization
Uganda	Akina Mama wa Afrika	AMwA	Feminism; Pan-Africanism	Pan-African feminist organization
Ukraine	The All-Ukraine Independent Trade Union (Zakhyst Pratsi)	AUITU	Laborism	Cross-sector Ukrainian labour union
United Kingdom	App Drivers & Couriers Union	ADCU	Laborism	Trade union for drivers and couriers
United Kingdom	Autonomous Design Group	ADG	Anti-capitalism; Anti-authoritarianism	Anti-capitalist art collective
United Kingdom	Common Wealth		Economic democracy; Democratic socialism	Progressive think tank
United Kingdom	Independent Workers Union of Great Britain	IWGB	Laborism	Trade union representing mainly migrant workers and gig workers
United Kingdom	Migrants Organise		Migrant rights	Migrant and refugee organization
United Kingdom	Momentum			Socialist organization, affiliated with the Labour Party
United Kingdom	Peace & Justice Project		Democratic socialism; Corbynism	British political organization
United Kingdom	The World Transformed		Left-wing politics	Left-wing political festival
United States	Arab Resource & Organizing Center	AROC	Socialism; Anti-Zionism; Prison abolitionism	Arab organization in the San Francisco Bay Area
United States	Brandworkers		Labor rights	Non-profit organization of food factory workers in New York and New Jersey
United States	CODEPINK		Anti-imperialism; Feminism	Anti-war organization
United States	Debt Collective		Debtors' rights; Anti-capitalism	Debtors' advocacy group, union of student debt strikers
United States	Democratic Socialists of America	DSA	Democratic socialism; Multi-tendency	Socialist organization of the USA
United States	KC Tenants		Tenant rights; Anti-capitalism	Tenants' association in Kansas City
United States	Sunrise Movement		Environmentalism; Green New Deal	Climate change organization
Zimbabwe	Zimbabwe People’s Land Rights Movement	ZPLRM	Land reform	Civic platform focused on the rights of marginalised communities to land based resources
Africa	WAELE Africa		Feminism	NGO dedicated to advencing the participation of African woman.
Europe	Commons Network		Anti-capitalism; Degrowth; Solidarity economy	Activist organization
International	Crash Course		Post-capitalism	Economics platform collective
International	Latin American Council of Social Sciences	CLACSO	Post-capitalism	International non-governmental institution with associative status at UNESCO
International	National Students for Justice in Palestine	NSJP	Anti-Zionism; Third Worldism; Palestinian nationalism	Resource center for pro-Palestinian student activism in the United States and Canada
International	Palestinian Youth Movement	PYM	Anti-Zionism	Trans-national organization of Palestinians in Palestine and in exile
International	Post Growth Institute	PGI	Degrowth; Post-capitalism	International post growth organization
International	Progressive Doctors		Anti-capitalism; Feminism; Anti-racism	International community of medical professionals

=== Publications ===
Publication	Country	Description
A2larm	Czech Republic	A left-wing online magazine focusing on Czech and international political issues.
Africa Is a Country	International	A media project challenging conventional narratives about Africa.
Alborada	United Kingdom	A platform for Latin American politics, culture, and media analysis.
Arena	Australia	An Australian radical and critical journal of politics and ideas.
Bidayat	Lebanon	A quarterly journal of politics and culture in the Arab world.
Black Agenda Report	United States	A Black American left media outlet covering local, national, and international issues.
Brasil 247	Brazil	A Brazilian online news outlet with a progressive stance.
Brasil Wire	Brazil	An English-language publication focused on Brazil's political scene.
Bulatlat	Philippines	A progressive news website covering Philippine political and social issues.
CTXT	Spain	A Spanish online magazine focused on politics, economy, and culture.
De Olho Nos Ruralistas	Brazil	A rural news platform investigating land rights and agribusiness in Brazil.
Collective Action in Tech	International	A publication documenting labor and organizing efforts in the tech industry.
Colombia Informa	Colombia	A Colombian alternative news outlet focused on social movements and workers' struggles.
Declassified UK	United Kingdom	Investigative journalism outlet focused on UK foreign policy and military actions.
Din Deng	Myanmar	A leftist Burmese-language online publication.
Dissent	United States	A quarterly magazine of politics and culture with a democratic socialist orientation.
El Ciudadano	Chile	A progressive Chilean newspaper focusing on politics, human rights, and social issues.
Feminism in India (FII)	India	A digital intersectional feminist platform to highlight issues related to women and marginalized communities in India.
Gazete Duvar	Turkey	An independent Turkish online news outlet focused on politics and human rights.
Himal Southasian	Nepal	A regional magazine of politics and culture covering South Asia.
IndoPROGRESS	Indonesia	A progressive online publication focusing on Indonesian political issues.
Internazionale	Italy	An Italian weekly magazine translating and republishing international journalism.
Jacobin	United States	A quarterly socialist magazine offering political analysis from a left-wing perspective.
Jadaliyya	International	A bilingual online magazine covering the Middle East, founded by academics and activists.
Jamhoor	Pakistan	A South Asian leftist publication focused on political issues in the region.
Junputh	India	An Indian progressive platform for social and political analysis.
Krytyka Polityczna	Poland	A Polish political and cultural magazine offering left-wing perspectives on politics and culture.
Lausan Collective	Hong Kong	A leftist publication focusing on Hong Kong's protest movements and labor rights.
Le Vent Se Lève (LVSL)	France	A French media outlet analyzing politics, economics, and social issues from a progressive viewpoint.
Mada Masr	Egypt	An independent online newspaper based in Egypt, covering politics and culture.
Mediapart	France	A French investigative journalism site.
Mondoweiss	United States	A news website covering American foreign policy in the Middle East, with a focus on Palestine-Israel issues.
Mérce	Hungary	A Hungarian left-wing political news outlet.
New Bloom	Taiwan	A Taiwanese publication focusing on social movements, culture, and politics.
Novara Media	United Kingdom	A British left-wing multimedia outlet covering politics and current affairs.
Nueva Sociedad	Argentina	A Latin American journal of social sciences and political analysis.
Outras Palavras	Brazil	A Brazilian progressive online platform for political commentary and analysis.
Qiao Collective	International	A leftist collective focusing on Chinese diaspora issues and China's political stance.
Review of African Political Economy	Africa	Academic journal covering African political economy with a broadly materialist interpretation of change.
Revista Común	Mexico	A Mexican publication focused on culture and progressive politics.
Sahrawi Voice	Sahrawi Republic	A media outlet focused on the Western Sahara conflict and Sahrawi rights.
Sev Bibar	Turkey	A Turkish left-wing publication focused on labor rights and Kurdish issues.
The Elephant	Kenya	A progressive Kenyan platform focused on current affairs and analysis.
The Nation	United States	A US-based progressive weekly magazine.
The Real News Network (TRNN)	United States	A non-profit news organization providing in-depth reporting on political issues.
The Wire	India	An Indian independent online news outlet.
Venezuelanalysis	Venezuela	A Venezuelan platform providing analysis from a pro-Bolivarian, pro-Maduro perspective.
ZNet	International	A progressive online publication focusing on global social and political issues.
openDemocracy	United Kingdom	A UK-based global independent media platform focusing on social justice and human rights.

=== Former members ===
Country	Party/Organization	Notes
Chile	Social Convergence (Convergencia Social)	Merged into the Broad Front
Poland	Partia Razem	Left Progressive International in March 2022 due to "the absence of declaration recognising Ukraine’s sovereignty and an absolute condemnation of Russian imperialism"
Russia	Left Bloc	On 11 November 2023, the Left Bloc announced the "closure of the project" and the cessation of publications due to censorship and repression in Russia.
Serbia	Ne davimo Beograd	Merged into the Green–Left Front
Ukraine	Commons	
United States	The Gravel Institute	Ceased operation in 2022.
