= Mutual aid =

Voluntary exchange of resources and services for mutual benefit

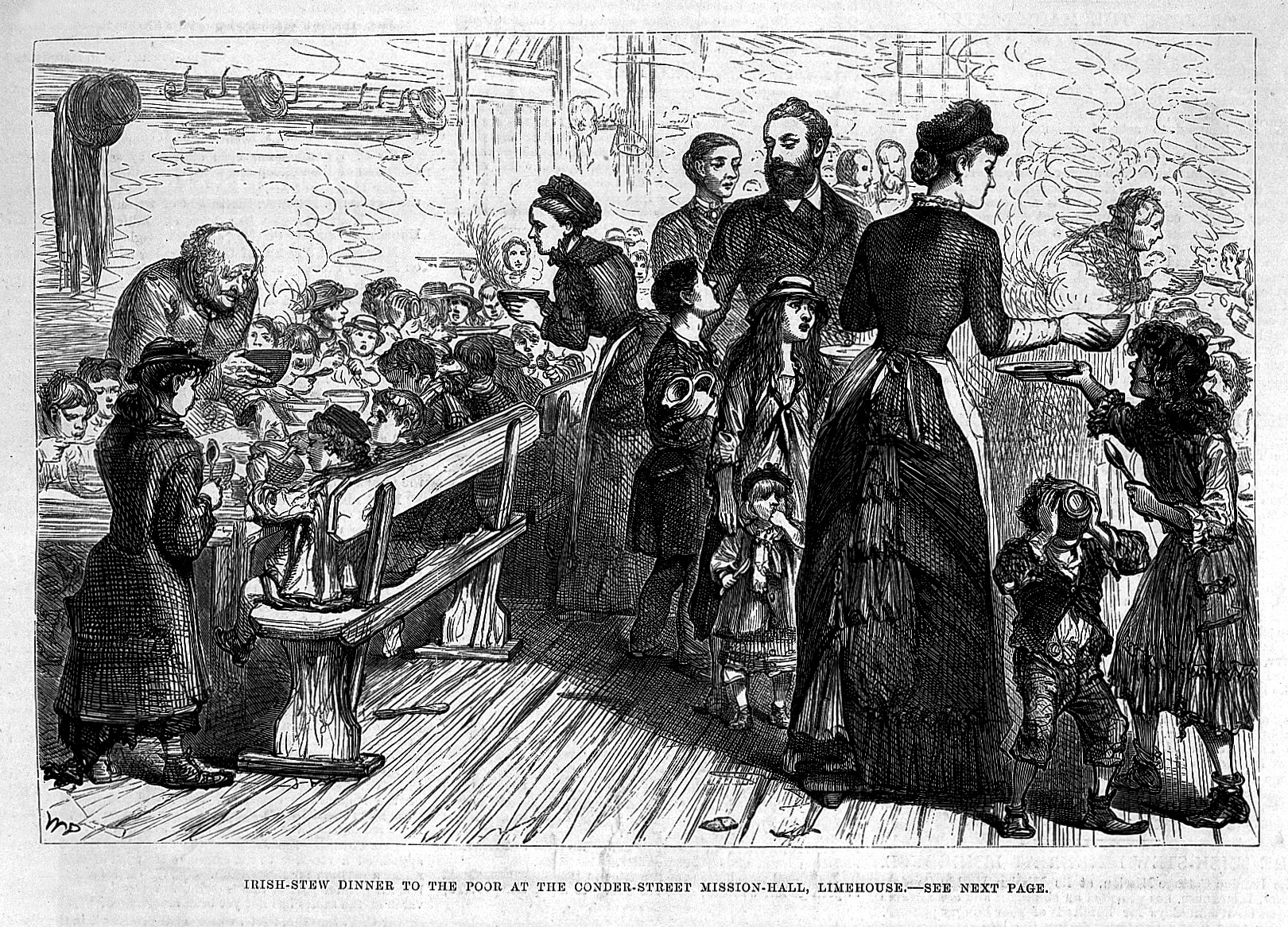
A mutual-aid soup kitchen Conder Street Mission Hall, 1881

Mutual aid traditionally refers to an organizational model where community members partake in voluntary, collaborative exchanges of resources and services to overcome social, economic, and political barriers and meet common needs while mobilizing to fight injustice. Mutual aid can include physical resources like food, clothing, or medicine, as well as services like breakfast programs or education. These groups are often built for the daily needs of their communities, but mutual aid groups are also found throughout relief efforts, such as in natural disasters or pandemics like the COVID-19 pandemic.

== Definition ==
Dean Spade identifies three key elements of mutual aid: (1) addressing material needs while analyzing why these needs aren't already met; (2) building solidarity and strengthening social movements; (3) participatory. In contrast to charity, which often requires benefit recipients to meet certain conditions (e.g., means testing, grant stipulations), mutual aid does not discriminate between those "deserving" and "undeserving" of care. These groups often go beyond material or service exchange and are set up as a form of political participation in which people take responsibility for caring for one another and changing political conditions.

Mutual aid groups are distinct in their drive to flatten hierarchy, searching for collective consensus decision-making across participating people rather than placing leadership within a closed executive team. With this joint decision-making, all participating members are empowered to enact change and take responsibility for the group.

== History ==
The term "mutual aid" was popularized by the anarchist philosopher Peter Kropotkin in his essay collection Mutual Aid: A Factor of Evolution, originally published in the late 19th and early 20th centuries. Kropotkin argued that cooperation, not competition, was the driving mechanism behind evolution, through biological mutualism. Kropotkin argued that mutual aid has pragmatic advantages for the survival of humans and animals and has been promoted through natural selection, and that mutual aid is arguably as ancient as human culture. This recognition of the widespread character and individual benefit of mutual aid stood in contrast to the theories of social Darwinism that emphasized individual competition and survival of the fittest.

== Practice ==
Mutual aid participants work together to figure out strategies and resources to meet each other's needs, such as food, housing, medical care, and disaster relief while organizing themselves against the system that created the shortage in the first place.

Typically, mutual-aid groups are member-led, member-organized, and open to all to participate in. They often have non-hierarchical, non-bureaucratic structures, with members controlling all resources. They are egalitarian in nature and designed to support participatory democracy, equality of member status, power-shared leadership, and consensus-based decision-making.

Some challenges to the success of mutual aid groups include lack of technical experts, lack of funding, lack of public legitimacy, and institutionalization of social hierarchies.

== Examples ==
In the 1800s and early 1900s, mutual aid organizations included unions, the friendly societies that were common throughout Europe in the eighteenth and nineteenth centuries, medieval craft guilds, the American "fraternity societies" that existed during the Great Depression providing their members with health and life insurance and funeral benefits, and the English working men's clubs of the 1930s that also provided health insurance. In the United States, mutual aid has been practiced extensively in marginalized communities, notably in Black communities, working-class neighborhoods, migrant groups, LGBT communities, and others. The Black Panther Party's urban food programs in the 1960s were another prominent example of mutual aid. During the AIDS crisis in the United States, many LGBT+ groups started mutual aid networks to provide medical care, support groups, and political activism when the government chose to ignore the community. A Common Ground Relief mutual aid group organized to provide disaster relief for the 2005 Hurricane Katrina.

During the COVID-19 pandemic, mutual aid and grassroots solidarity groups around the world organized distribution networks for food and personal protective equipment. The term "mutual aid", previously associated with anarchism, drifted into public parlance during the pandemic. Local mutual aid groups, sometimes as local as the street level, organized to help shop, deliver medicine, create games for kids, offering civic connection during a time of isolation. Multiple online outlets ran stories on how to create a mutual aid group.

Around the same time was the Black Lives Matter movement, which resulted in multiple protestors detained and arrested by police. Bail funds, which are community organizations that pays cash bail for people in need for free, is another example of a mutual aid organization.

== See also ==
- Benefit society
- Communal work
- Community fridge
- Gift economy
- Little Free Pantries
- Mutual Aid: A Factor of Evolution, by Peter Kropotkin
- Mutual credit
- Mutual insurance
- Mutual organization
- Mutualism
- Solidarity
- Solidarity economy
- Sociability

== Bibliography ==
- Amaro Hernández, José (1983). Mutual Aid for Survival: The Case of the Mexican American. Krieger. ISBN 9780898745467.
- Awry, Wren, ed. (2023). Nourishing Resistance: Stories of Food, Protest, and Mutual Aid. PM Press. ISBN 978-1-62963-996-3. LCCN 2022943234.
- Bacharach, Samuel B.; Bamberger, Peter; Sonnenstuhl, William J. (2001). Mutual Aid and Union Renewal: Cycles of Logics of Action. Cornell University Press. ISBN 0-8014-8734-X. LCCN 00-012151. Archived from the original on 2023-02-06.
- Baylouny, Anne Marie (2010). Privatizing Welfare in the Middle East: Kin Mutual Aid Associations in Jordan and Lebanon. Indiana University Press. ISBN 978-0-253-22195-7. LCCN 2009045228.
- Beito, David T. (2000). From Mutual Aid to the Welfare State: Fraternal Societies and Social Services, 1890-1967. University of North Carolina Press. ISBN 0-8078-4841-7. LCCN 99-41895.
- Borkman, Thomasina (1999). Understanding Self-help/mutual Aid: Experiential Learning in the Commons. Rutgers University Press. ISBN 0-8135-2630-2. LCCN 98-50649. Archived from the original on 2023-02-06.
- Borsay, Anne (2016) [2007]. Borsay, Anne; Shapely, Pete (eds.). Medicine, Charity and Mutual Aid: The Consumption of Health and Welfare in Britain, c.1550–1950. Routledge. doi:10.4324/9781315594699. ISBN 978-0-7546-5148-2. LCCN 2006030263.
- Bridgen, Paul; Harris, Bernard, eds. (2007). Charity and Mutual Aid in Europe and North America since 1800. Routledge. ISBN 978-0-203-93240-7. LCCN 2007031877.
- Delalande, Nicolas (2023). Struggle and Mutual Aid: The Age of Worker Solidarity. Other Press. ISBN 9781635420111. LCCN 2022027364.
- Firth, Rhiannon (2022). Disaster Anarchy: Mutual Aid and Radical Action. Pluto Press. ISBN 978-0-7453-4046-3. OCLC 1288196115.
- Gitterman, Alex; Shulman, Lawrence, eds. (2005). Mutual Aid Groups, Vulnerable and Resilient Populations, and the Life Cycle. Columbia University Press. ISBN 0-231-12885-1. LCCN 2005056035.
- Grubačić, Andrej; O'Hearn, Denis (2016). Living at the Edges of Capitalism: Adventures in Exile and Mutual Aid. University of California Press. ISBN 9780520962484. LCCN 2015036704.
- Midgley, James; Hosaka, Mitsuhiko, eds. (2011). Grassroots Social Security in Asia: Mutual Aid, Microinsurance and Social Welfare. Routledge. ISBN 978-0-203-83178-6. LCCN 2010031554.
- Moyse Steinberg, Dominique (2009) [2004]. The Mutual-aid Approach to Working with Groups: Helping People Help One Another (2nd ed.). Routledge. ISBN 978-0-7890-1462-7. LCCN 2004007025.
- Preston, John; Firth, Rhiannon (2020). Coronavirus, Class and Mutual Aid in the United Kingdom. Springer. ISBN 9783030577131.
- Servigne, Pablo; Chapelle, Gauthier (2022). Mutual Aid: The Other Law of the Jungle. Wiley. ISBN 978-1509547920.
- Rebecca, Solnit (2020). Sitrin, Marina; Sembrar, Colectiva (eds.). Pandemic Solidarity: Mutual Aid During the Covid-19 Crisis. Pluto Press. doi:10.2307/j.ctv12sdx5v. ISBN 978-0-7453-4320-4. JSTOR j.ctv12sdx5v. S2CID 240768553.
- Swain, Dan; Urban, Petr; Malabou, Catherine; Kouba, Petr, eds. (2021). Unchaining Solidarity: On Mutual Aid and Anarchism with Catherine Malabou. Rowman & Littlefield. ISBN 9781538157961. LCCN 2021034081.
- Winfield Fretz, Joseph (2020). Christian Mutual Aid: A Handbook of Brotherhood Economics. Wipf and Stock. ISBN 9781725283695.
