= Dušan Pajović =

Left-wing activist and author

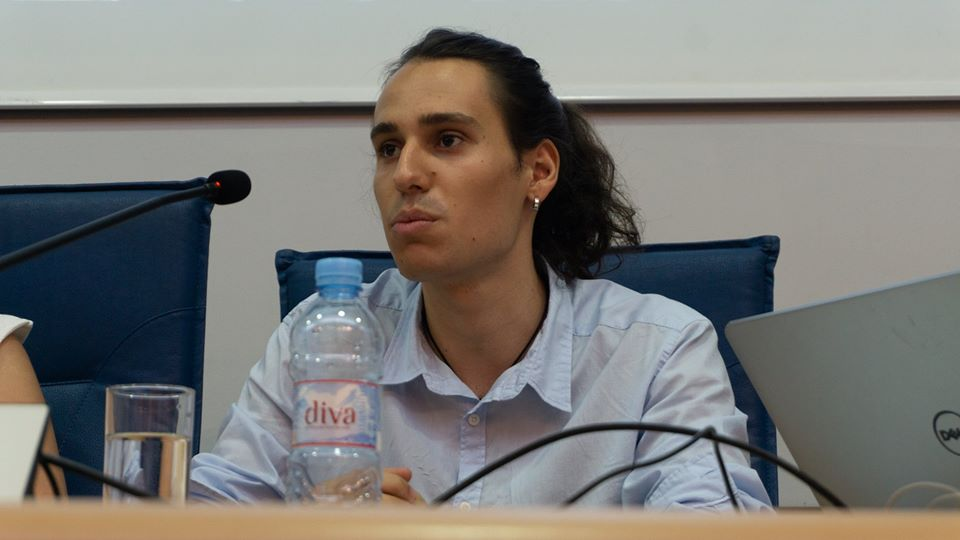
Dušan Pajović in a Make Fur History conference in Podgorica, Montenegro.

Dušan Pajović (born 12 July 1997) is a Montenegrin left-wing activist and author. He has been described as "the new striking face on the Montenegrin political scene" and was considered the Person of the Year in that country by Le Courrier des Balkans. Pajović is a prominent member of the Democracy in Europe Movement 2025.

== Democracy in Europe Movement 2025 (DiEM25) ==
Dušan Pajović is a coordinator of DiEM25's campaigns and an ex officio member of its Coordinating Collective, the highest body of the movement. He has organized or helped in the organization of many campaigns, including the well-known Green New Deal for Europe. Pajović finds DiEM25 as his calling, believing it's the only valuable radical and realistic alternative that can truly change Europe and the world.

== Political thought and activity ==
Pajović's areas of interest are Balkan politics, with a special focus on Montenegro, analysis of right-wing populism and clericalism, post-capitalism economy, degrowth, anarchism and total liberation theory.

He is a regular columnist for the biggest opposition media in Montenegro, Cafe del Montenegro (CdM). His articles can also be found in various media, such as the DiEM25 website, Novi Plamen, GND Media, Portal Analitika and others. In the past he has collaborated with many different organizations including Humanity & Inclusion, Animal Save Movement, UNICEF and the United Nations (UN). His engagement since his teenage years in climate and animal rights activism brought him the experience of knowledge in street actions, advocacy and social change theory. He has used those skills in his activism, writing, research and interviews.

Although very young, Pajović has already written many op-ed articles and has appeared in many interviews, podcasts and documentaries alongside figures such as Noam Chomsky, Yanis Varoufakis, Jason Hickel, Ann Pettifor, Caroline Lucas, Srećko Horvat and others.

Dušan published his first book in July 2023, titled Između propasti i nade: Crna Gora u okovima kapitalizma i klerofašizma ("Between doom and hope: Montenegro in the shackles of capitalism and clerofascism"). The book is a collection of essays published by Fokalizator.

== Awards and education ==
Dušan Pajović was awarded Person of the Year in Montenegro for 2022 by Le Courrier des Balkans. In 2023, he was awarded the Best Essay award by the Association of Montenegrin Publishers. He is a recipient of the "19th December" student award by the Capital of Montenegro, and "The Best Student of Generation" by University of Donja Gorica (UDG), where he completed his Bachelor's degree in applied psychology. Pajovíc also holds a Master's degree in Psychology of Intercultural Relations from Instituto Universitário de Lisboa.
