= MERA25 =

German political party

- Co-Leaders: Salsabil Hamadache; Johannes Fehr
- Deputy Co-Leaders: Imran Akyol
- Chairpersons: Salsabil Hamadache; Johannes Fehr; Imran Akyol; Yanic Dollhopf; Danielle Page; Antonia Milbert; Marie-Olivia Badarne; Franziska Ludolph; Grigori Koutsogkilas
- Founded: 13 November 2021
- Membership (2024): 2,500
- Ideology: Progressivism
- European political alliance: Democracy in Europe Movement 2025 (DiEM25)

Website
- www.mera25.de

MERA25 (an abbreviation from the Greek: Μέτωπο Ευρωπαϊκής Ρεαλιστικής Ανυπακοής; German: Europäische realistische Ungehorsamfront, lit. 'European Realistic Disobedience Front') is a German left-wing political party. It is part of the Democracy in Europe Movement 2025 (DiEM25), a pan-European movement. The party was founded first as Democracy in Europe (German: Demokratie in Europa) on 28 November 2020, and then was renamed to MERA25 on 13 November 2021, in reference to the Greek party with the same name.

== History ==
Democracy in Europe Movement 2025 was founded on 9 February 2016, at the Volksbühne, Berlin. In an internal Europe-wide online vote, Democracy in Europe Movement 2025 decided to establish another political association in Germany for the 2019 European elections. It was founded on 2 June 2018, in Frankfurt under the name Democracy in Europe (DiEM25). Laura Müller and Jasper Finkeldey were elected as the two chairpersons at the General Assembly of DiEM25 on 24 November 2018. The top candidate for the European elections in Germany was former Greek Finance Minister Yanis Varoufakis, with Daniela Platsch running as the second to top candidate. The party was supported by Democracy in Motion and Mut. In the election, the party won 130,072 votes in Germany. This corresponded to a vote share of 0.3 percent, which was not enough for any of the 96 German representatives for the European Parliament.

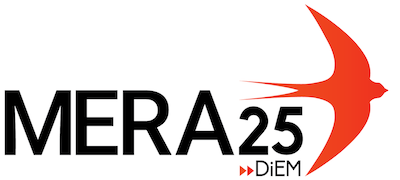
Old logo of the Party

On 28 November 2020, the association was founded as a party under the name Democracy in Europe. On 13 November 2021, the party was re-established and took the name of the Greek electoral wing MέΡA25. MERA25 ran for the first time in the 2023 Bremen state election. The campaign was financed exclusively by individual donations and focused on the topic of housing. The party accounted for 0.6% of all valid second votes.

The party was involved in organizing the Palestine Congress in 2024, which was broken up by the police. In October of the same year, the party launched a petition for the immediate resignation of Foreign Minister Baerbock of the Greens because of complicity "in serious violations of international law, including genocide and apartheid" with regard to the genocide in Gaza. The petition received over 23,000 signatures after one month. Tobias Prüwer wrote in the anti-German weekly Jungle World that "international anti-Zionism" had found its German party in MERA25.

In the 2024 European parliament elections, MERA25 received 118,616 votes, or 0.3% of the federal vote. The party failed to elect any members of the European Parliament.

== Ideology and Platform ==
For MERA25 social policies and radical democracy are the focus of its political orientation. It is supportive of direct democracy. On the political spectrum it is considered a left-wing party. The key points of the party program are:

- Social security with a guaranteed pension, housing and health care
- Workers' rights including a job guarantee, a 4-day week, a universal basic income and increased salaries in social and service jobs
- The Green New Deal for climate neutrality by 2030 for investments in the economy, energy, construction, agricultural sectors and the labor market
- Peace policy against increased military spending
- Justice for marginalised groups, private individuals towards the state and business, as well as states in the Global South. Migration should be decriminalised and Frontex should be abolished and replaced by search and rescue missions
- The democratisation and federalisation of the European Union, which the party currently believes as an institution with oligarchic features, whose policies evade the democratic control of its citizens

== Election results ==
=== Federal parliament (Bundestag) ===
Election	Leader	Constituency		Party list		Seats	+/–	Government
Election	Leader	Votes	%	Votes	%	Seats	+/–	Government
2025	Julijana Zita	658	0.00 (#26)	7,128	0.01 (#24)	0 / 630	New	Extra-parliamentary

=== European Parliament ===
Election	List leader	Votes	%	Seats	+/–	EP Group
2019	Yanis Varoufakis	130,229	0.35 (#15)	0 / 96	New	–
2024	Karin De Rigo; Johannes Fehr	118,616	0.30 (#20)	0 / 96	0	–
