= Shaun Hargreaves Heap =

Shaun Hargreaves Heap is a professor of political economy at King's College, London. He is an expert on game theory, behavioural economics, and macroeconomic policy.

== Biography ==
Hargreaves Heap was an undergraduate at Oxford University and completed his PhD at UC Berkeley.

Professor Hargreaves Heap taught at the University of East Anglia, Concordia University and the University of Sydney.

Hargreaves Heap joined the Department of Political Economy at King's in 2013, where his current work studies the impact of social influences on individual decision making

== Publications ==
Books

- Game theory: a critical introduction (2004) with Yanis Varoufakis

Articles and chapters

- 'Choosing the Wrong 'Natural' Rate: Accelerating Inflation or Decelerating Employment and Growth?' (1980) 90(359) Economic Journal 611
- "Economic man", The New Palgrave Dictionary of Economics (2008)
- 'What is the meaning of behavioural economics?' Cambridge Journal of Economics 2013, 37(5), 985-1000.
- 'The value of groups', American Economic Review, 99, March 2009, 295- 323, with D. Zizzo
- 'Some experimental evidence on the evolution of discrimination, cooperation and the perception of fairness', Economic Journal, July 2002, p. 679-703, with Yanis Varoufakis)
