= Sanders Institute =

American think tank

The Sanders Institute is an American progressive think tank founded in 2017 by Jane Sanders, the wife of Bernie Sanders, and her son David Driscoll.

The institute occupied an office in Burlington, Vermont with three staff members and volunteer fellows. It was initially funded with $25,000 of personal money from the Sanders family to help cover the approximate $125,000 cost in starting the non-profit. Our Revolution, an organization which was spun off from the 2016 Sanders campaign, contributed the rest of the seed money, which was to be repaid later on.

In November 2018, the institute hosted "The Gathering", a convention of progressive politicians and activists. Attendees included Cornel West, Danny Glover, and Carmen Yulín Cruz. Around the same time, it co-founded the political international Progressive International with the Democracy in Europe Movement 2025, and launched it in 2020.

In March 2019, the institute announced that it was going to suspend operations by the end of May 2019 to avoid any issues with Sanders 2020 presidential campaign.

In April 2021, the institute was relaunched with a $350,000 donation by the 2020 Bernie Sanders presidential campaign.
