= The Global Minotaur =

2011 book by Yanis Varoufakis

- First edition
- Author: Yanis Varoufakis
- Language: English
- Subject: Economics
- Genre: Non-fiction
- Published: 2011 Zed Books
- Publication place: England
- Media type: Print, e-book
- ISBN: 978-1-78360-610-8

The Global Minotaur: America, Europe and the Future of the Global Economy is a book by economist and former Minister of Finance for Greece Yanis Varoufakis, first published in 2011 by Zed Books. A third edition was released in July 2015 with the updated subtitle America, the True Causes of the Financial Crisis and the Future of the World Economy.

The book seeks to explain the origins of the 2008 financial crisis through an analogy of the story of the Minotaur from Greek mythology. Specifically he argues that since the 1970s the United States have played the role of a Global Minotaur, consuming surplus capital from the rest of the global economy, and maintaining global economic stability in the process. He argues the 2008 crash can be understood as resulting from a potentially fatal wound inflicted on the Minotaur by the collapse of the banking system.

== Synopsis ==
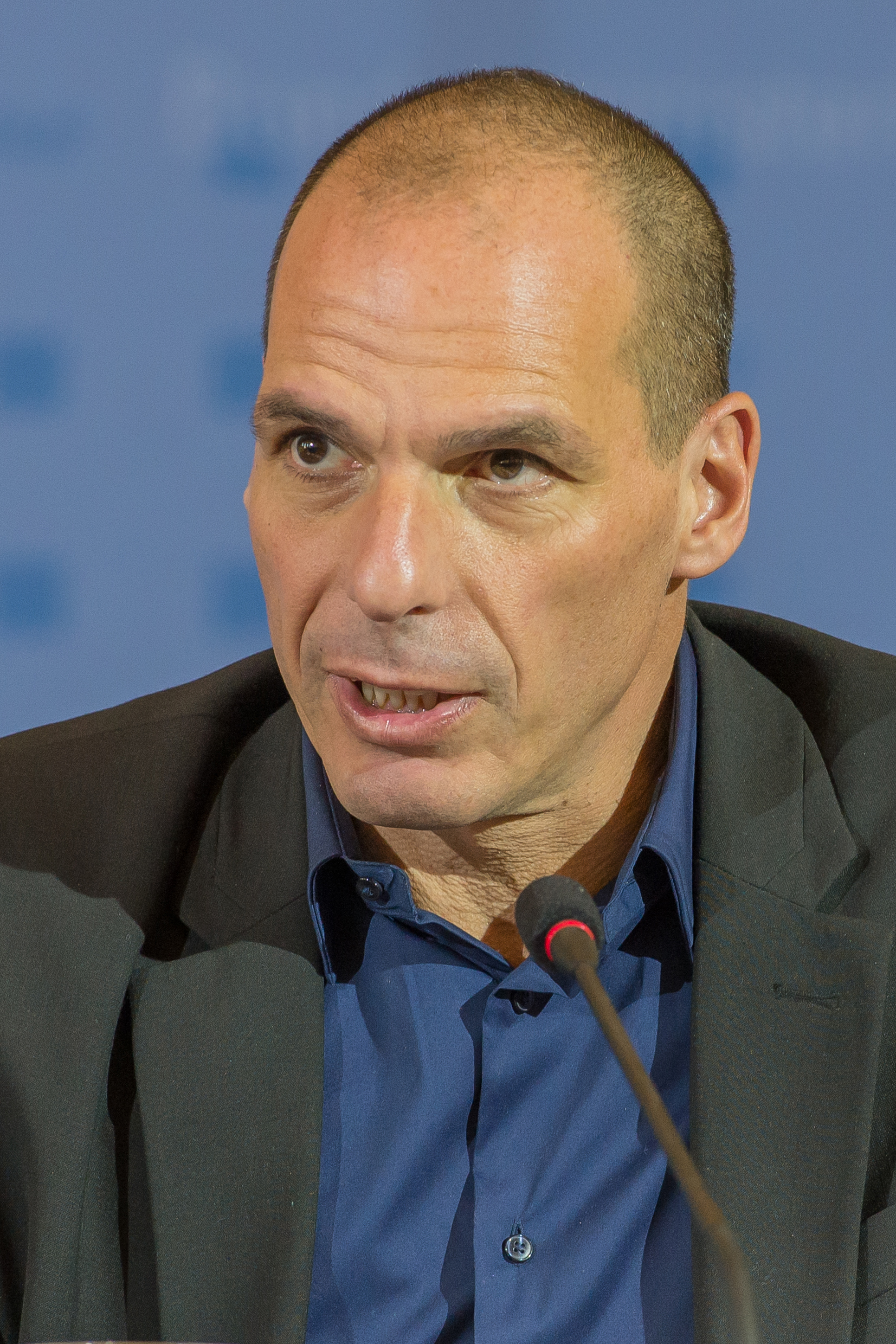
Yanis Varoufakis in February 2015

=== The Great Depression, World War 2 and the Global Plan ===
Varoufakis begins his analysis with the great crash of 1929 and the Great Depression that followed as a result. He argues that Franklin D. Roosevelt's New Deal was not enough to bring America out of recession, and that it wasn't until the Second World War and the massive public spending program it brought about that the USA finally recovered.

Once the war began to recede, US planners became concerned that recession would once again take hold, and to address this in 1944 they organised the Bretton Woods Conference, a gathering of global leaders that was to determine the design of the post-war global economy. While John Maynard Keynes, negotiating on behalf of Great Britain, proposed an International Currency Union with incentives for balancing global trade this was rejected by the US in favour of what Varoufakis calls the 'Global Plan'.

The USA came out of the Second World War as the world's major power with twin trade and budget surpluses, and so rejected Keynes' proposal in favour of an alternative plan that would preserve its hegemony. The Global Plan involved the creation of a system of fixed exchange rates with the US dollar pegged to gold at a fixed exchange rate of $35 an ounce. The plan also involved the rebuilding of the German and Japanese economies, devastated by the war. Early examples were the Marshall Plan in Europe and later the Korean War for Japan. Crucially the plan's only 'Global Surplus Recycling Mechanism' was one which would recycle American surpluses to the rest of the world economy, thus only temporarily preserving apparent global stability by avoiding unstable trade imbalances for the United States and its fellow surplus nations via the IMF and World Bank.

=== The Global Minotaur ===
The global plan dissolved around 1971 as a result of the rising costs of the Vietnam War and domestic social programs transforming the US from a surplus nation to a deficit nation. The increased quantities of US dollars on the global market gave rise to inflationary pressures and political turbulence that ultimately led to President Nixon announcing in 1971 that the dollar would no longer be convertible to gold, bringing about the end of the Bretton Woods era. As the global plan fell apart America took on the role of a 'Global Minotaur'. America was now a deficit nation with a significant trade and budget deficit, which it was able to maintain due to the flow of capital from the world's surplus nations into Wall Street.

To explain why capital was invested in America in this way, Varoufakis outlines four 'charismas' of the Minotaur that compelled the world's economy to accept America's new role in the global economy. First the status of the dollar as the world's reserve currency, and as the currency in which energy was denominated. Second, rising global energy costs due to OPEC-led price increases damaged the competitiveness of America's economic rivals. Thirdly, cheapened labour in USA in the 1970s saw corporate profits rise and made American companies attractive to investors. Finally, America's geopolitical might, frequently employed in support of American corporations, again encouraged investment. These factors collectively ensured sufficient capital flight into America to allow it to sustain its new position as a deficit nation, with this flight itself acting as a 'peculiar' global surplus recycling mechanism.

=== The 2008 Crash and the future of the global economy ===
Varoufakis argues that the age of the Global Minotaur ended with the 2008 financial crash. For Varoufakis the crash was caused by Wall Street taking advantage of its position in the age of the Global Minotaur to build up colossal amounts of private money on the back of its profits in a process of 'financialisation', which then collapsed as it became unsustainable. Crucially, the crash caused the Global Minotaur to be wounded as America's banking sector was no longer able to attract sufficient capital to balance the USA's twin trade and budget deficits.

With the newfound lack of a global surplus recycling mechanism Varoufakis considers possible future alternatives in a postscript published in the 2015 second edition of the book. He considers the possibility of a mechanism similar to that proposed by Keynes at Bretton Woods, but concludes that such a replacement for the Global Minotaur will require the support of America as the most likely global leader. This however relies on American policy makers grasping the meaning and irreversibility of the Minotaur's demise.

Even though some critics consider some of the explanations in the book simplistic, there are some of them who agrees with the basic premise: without a rising tide of external demand, the eurozone has failed to disperse spending sufficiently within its borders, with crisis the inevitable result.

== Reception ==
In a review in the Financial Times, Giles Wilkes stated his belief that while Varoufakis is guilty of 'bad history' and cherry-picking, his basic diagnosis that a lack of external demand or a mechanism for dispersing spending was responsible for the Eurozone crisis 'may be correct'.

Remarking on Varoufakis's 'valiant' but ultimately unsuccessful efforts to fight for global reforms as Greek finance minister the Evening Standard described the book as an 'incisive analysis [that] may yet inspire others'.
