= Democracy in Europe Movement 2025 =

Left-wing European political alliance

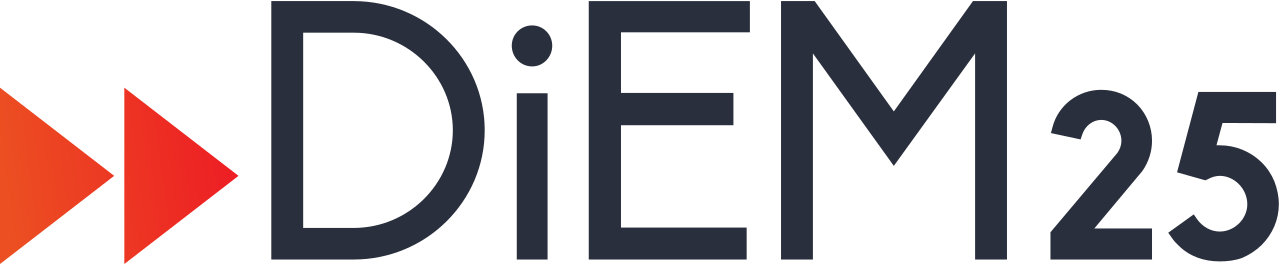
- Abbreviation: DiEM25
- Secretary-General: Yanis Varoufakis
- Founders: Yanis Varoufakis; Srećko Horvat
- Founded: 9 February 2016; 10 years ago
- Membership (2024): 173,000
- Ideology: Pan-Europeanism; Post-capitalism; Progressivism; Democratic socialism Environmentalism; Ecofeminism; Alter-globalisation
- Political position: Left-wing
- International affiliation: Progressive International
- Colours: Orange-red
- European Parliament: 0 / 720
- European Commission: 0 / 27
- European Council: 0 / 27
- European Lower Houses: 0 / 6,217
- European Upper Houses: 0 / 1,459

Website
- diem25.org

The Democracy in Europe Movement 2025, or DiEM25, is a left-wing European political alliance. It operates as a pan-European umbrella for subsidiary parties sharing the same name and branding (e.g. MeRA25, MERA25), and runs electoral lists with other affiliated parties. Despite its organisation and sometimes being referred to as a "European party" or "transnational party", DiEM25 does not meet the requirements to register as a European political party.

DiEM25 was founded by a group of Europeans, including Yanis Varoufakis and Srećko Horvat. The movement was officially launched at ceremonial events in 2016 in the Volksbühne theatre in Berlin and on 23 March in Rome.

DiEM25 is the co-founder of the political international Progressive International which it created with the Sanders Institute in November 2018 and launched it in mid 2020.

DiEM25's tendencies are alter-globalisation, social ecology, ecofeminism, post-growth and post-capitalism. Implementation of a universal basic income is widely defended among its members.

The acronym DiEM alludes to the Latin phrase carpe diem. To highlight the urgency of democratising Europe, the movement had set the horizon for the year 2025 to draft a democratic constitution to replace all European treaties. Yet, it failed to elect representatives in the European Parliament up to the 2024 European elections.

== Aims ==
DiEM25 argues that the people of Europe need to seize the opportunity to create political organisations at a pan-European level. Its participants consider that the model of national parties forming fragile alliances in the European Parliament is obsolete and that a pan-European movement is necessary to confront the great economic, political and social crises in Europe today. In its analysis, the movement considers that these crises threaten to disintegrate Europe, and which possess characteristics that are similar to those of the Great Depression of the 1930s.

DiEM25 would like to act as an umbrella organization, gathering left-wing parties, grassroots protest movements and "rebel regions" to develop a common response to the five crises Europe faces today, namely debt, banking, poverty, low investment and migration.

== Brexit ==
DiEM25 seeks to avert European fracture. In the lead up to the Brexit referendum, DiEM25 co-founder Yanis Varoufakis worked with British Labour Party leader Jeremy Corbyn to support Great Britain's stay in the European Union. Varoufakis cited the special concessions granted by the European Union to the United Kingdom in February 2016 as evidence of European disintegration. After the Leave victory in the Brexit referendum DiEM25 members decided to support the triggering of article 50 on the condition that the UK would exit the EU under a Norway+ agreement, preserving freedom of movement and access to the single market. In light of the UK government's refusal to negotiate such an agreement, in October 2018 DiEM25 members voted to launch a campaign, "Take a Break from Brexit", calling for an extension of the negotiations period, under article 50 provisions. However, in defiance of the official stance of the movement and of his own previously stated opinion Varoufakis publicly opposed the extension and in May 2020, a few months after the defeat of Jeremy Corbyn, declared his support for a no deal Brexit at the end of the transition phase.

== Structure ==
DiEM25 has four constituent parts, namely a Coordinating Collective (CC), a Validation Council (VC), DiEM25 Spontaneous Collectives (DSCs) and an advisory board. To raise money, DiEM25 uses crowdfunding.

The Coordinating Collective has twelve members who meet weekly to lead DiEM25's actions. DiEM25 schedules an electronic vote every six months to permit all DiEM25 members to renew half of the CC's seats. Coordinating Collective members cannot simultaneously belong to another political party, or be ministers or parliamentarians still in office.

The Validation Council has 100 participants who monitor DiEM25 members’ good conduct, make decisions when urgency and time do not permit a membership digital referendum and validate the Coordinating Collective's proposals. Any DiEM25 member can apply to join the VC; DiEM25 selects Validation Council seats by drawing lots. Like the Coordinating Collective vote, DiEM25 schedules a selection for half of the VC's seats every six months.

DiEM25 Spontaneous Collectives self-organize to forward DiEM's goals. DSCs form based on affinity and municipal, regional or national location, meeting face-to-face or online.

The advisory board advises DiEM25. The Coordinating Collective and the Validation Council jointly elect advisors based on their recognized achievements and expertise in their fields (artistic, political and academic, among others).

One year after its foundation, DiEM25 declared that it had 60,000 members from across the European Union.

=== Coordinating Collective ===
2016	(Poland) Agnieszka Wiśniewska	(United Kingdom) Brian Eno	(Italy) Cristina Soler-Savini	(Turkey) Elif Shafak	(Poland) Igor Stokfiszewski	(Italy) Lorenzo Marsili	(United States) Noam Chomsky	(Croatia) Srećko Horvat	(Germany) Thomas Seibert	(United Kingdom) Vivienne Westwood	(Greece) Yanis Varoufakis	(United Kingdom) Zoe Gardner	
2017	(Poland) Agnieszka Wiśniewska	(United Kingdom) Brian Eno	(Turkey) Elif Shafak	(Portugal) Gianna Merki	(Italy) Lorenzo Marsili	(United States) Noam Chomsky	(Spain) Orla de Díez	(Italy) Paola Pietrandre	(Guatemala) Renata Ávila Pinto	(United Kingdom) Rosemary Bechler	(Croatia) Srećko Horvat	(Greece) Yanis Varoufakis	
2018	(Poland) Agnieszka Wiśniewska	(United Kingdom) Brian Eno	(Turkey) Elif Shafak	(Portugal) Gianna Merki	(Italy) Lorenzo Marsili	(United States) Noam Chomsky	(Spain) Orla de Díez	(Italy) Paola Pietrandre	(Guatemala) Renata Ávila Pinto	(United Kingdom) Rosemary Bechler	(Croatia) Srećko Horvat	(Greece) Yanis Varoufakis	
2019	(Poland) Agnieszka Dziemianowicz-Bąk	(Austria) Daniela Platsch	(Greece) Erik Edman	(Portugal) Gianna Merki	(Serbia) Ivana Nenadović	(Spain) Jordi Ayala Roqueta	(Finland) Mame Faye-Rexhepi	(Guatemala) Renata Ávila Pinto	(Italy) Simona Ferlini	(Greece) Sissy Velissariou	(Croatia) Srećko Horvat	(Greece) Yanis Varoufakis	
2020	(Turkey) Beral Medra	(Greece) Erik Edman	(Greece) Fotini Bakadima	(Serbia) Ivana Nenadović	(Spain) Jordi Ayala Roqueta	(Germany) Juljana Zita	(Italy) Patricia Pozzo	(Guatemala) Renata Ávila Pinto	(United Kingdom) Rosemary Bechler	(Italy) Simona Ferlini	(Croatia) Srećko Horvat	(Greece) Yanis Varoufakis	
2021	(Turkey) Beral Medra	(Greece) Erik Edman	(Greece) Fotini Bakadima	(United Kingdom) Francesca Martinez	(Serbia) Ivana Nenadović	(Germany) Jochen Schult	(Germany) Juljana Zita	(Serbia) Maja Pelević	(Italy) Patricia Pozzo	(United Kingdom) Rosemary Bechler	(Croatia) Srećko Horvat	(Greece) Yanis Varoufakis	
2022	(Greece) Danae Stratou	(Turkey) Defne Dalkara	(Greece) Erik Edman	(United Kingdom) Francesca Martinez	(Serbia) Ivana Nenadović	(Germany) Jochen Schult	(United Kingdom) Julia May Moore	(Germany) Juljana Zita	(Serbia) Maja Pelević	(Italy) Patricia Pozzo	(Croatia) Srećko Horvat	(Greece) Yanis Varoufakis	
2023	(Greece) Danae Stratou	(Turkey) Defne Dalkara	(Greece) Erik Edman	(United Kingdom) Francesca Martinez	(Serbia) Ivana Nenadović	(Germany) Jochen Schult	(United Kingdom) Julia May Moore	(Germany) Juljana Zita	(Serbia) Maja Pelević	(Zimbabwe) Nomazulu Thata	(Italy) Patricia Pozzo	(Greece) Yanis Varoufakis	
2024	(Germany) Carolina Rehrmann	(Greece) Danae Stratou	(Turkey) Defne Dalkara	(Greece) Erik Edman	(Greece) Evi Petsangouraki	(Italy) Federico Dolce	(United Kingdom) Francesca Martinez	(Serbia) Ivana Nenadović	(United Kingdom) Julia May Moore	(Germany) Juljana Zita	(France) Nils Belliot	(Syria) Nour Hariri	(Greece) Yanis Varoufakis

== Electoral politics ==
=== Electoral wings (political parties as part of the movement) ===
DiEM25 has electoral wings, which are parties that are a tool of the movement to get involved in electoral politics and bring its program to the ballot box. Currently there are the following established electoral wings:

Party	Nation	Leader	Founded	Seats in upper chamber	Seats in lower chamber	Seats in the European Parliament	Last national election result	Last European election result	Ref
MeRA25	Greece	Yanis Varoufakis	2018	Unicameral	0 / 300	0 / 21	2.5%	2.5%	
MERA25	Germany	Julijana Zita	2021	0 / 69	0 / 630	0 / 96	0.01%	0.3%	
MERA25	Italy	Federico Dolce	2022	0 / 205	0 / 400	0 / 76	Did not stand	Stood as part of Peace Land Dignity	
MERA25	Sweden		2024	Unicameral	0 / 349	0 / 21	Did not stand	Did not stand	
MERA25	Netherlands		2025	0 / 75	0 / 150	0 / 31	Did not stand	Did not stand	

=== European Parliament election in 2019 and in 2024 ===
From its foundation, DiEM25 gathered affiliations from national political parties that agree with the DiEM25 agenda and in May 2017 began discussing running on a shared ticket in the 2019 European Parliament election. From this alliance, DiEM25 established an electoral list for the 2019 European Parliament elections named European Spring which by 2019 was styling itself a transnational European political party list. On 25 November 2018, Varoufakis was chosen as a Spitzenkandidat for DiEM25 in the 2019 European Parliament elections. However, DiEM25 did not elect any MEPs in 2019 and most affiliated parties ceased to exist, disaffiliated or did not stand in the subsequent 2024 European Parliament election. In these elections, DiEM25 supported MERA25 electoral lists in Germany and Greece, and the list Peace Land Dignity in Italy. Once again, none of them elected MEPs. Affiliated parties were the following:

Party	Nation	Seats in the European Parliament	Last national election result	Last European election result	Ref
Der Wandel	Austria	0 / 18	0.5%	Did not stand	
Alternativet	Denmark	0 / 13	3.3%	2.7% (affiliated until 2023)	
Génération.s	France	0 / 74	Part of the New Popular Front (NPF) (26.63%)	Did not stand	
Democracy in Europe – DiEM25	Germany	0 / 96	Did not stand	0.3%	
Democracy in Motion (until 2025)	Germany	0 / 96	0.1%	Did not stand	
Mut (until 2026)	Germany	0 / 96	Did not stand	Did not stand	
MeRA25	Greece	0 / 21	2.5%	2.5%	
èViva (until 2023)	Italy	0 / 76	Part of PD–IDP (19.1%)	Did not stand	
Lewica Razem (until 2022)	Poland	0 / 51	Part of The Left (8.6%)	6.3% (disaffiliated in 2022)	
LIVRE (until 2019)	Portugal	0 / 21	1.3%	1.8% (affiliated until 2019)	
Actúa (until 2023)	Spain	0 / 54	0.4%	Did not stand	
Izquierda en Positivo (until 2025)	Spain	0 / 54	0.1%	Did not stand	

- a: Since 2016, Luigi De Magistris's Democracy and Autonomy was a member for Italy, but it broke with Diem25 in favour of an alliance with Power to the People in November 2018.
- b: Percentage based on total valid votes cast in Asturias, Madrid, Ávila, Sevilla, Cáceres, Segovia, Badajoz and Balears. Actúa ballots were only available in these eight provinces.
- c: Percentage based on total valid votes cast in Murcia, Barcelona, Girona, Lleida and Tarragona. Izquierda en Positivo ballots were only available in these five provinces.
- d: Percentage based on total valid party list votes cast in Baden-Württemberg and Rhineland-Palatinate. Democracy in Motion only appeared on the ballot in these two states.

== Development, criticism and reception ==
The launch of the initiative was covered by the international press. The leading European media reflected in their reports the following days both the potential of the movement and the major contradictions it faces. Varoufakis was asked by the press about the relationship between his initiative and the proposals of other leaders of the European left to confront and to handle what they see as a "crisis of neoliberalism", including the proposals of Oskar Lafontaine in Germany and Jean-Luc Mélenchon in France, for a recovery of sovereignty and a return to national currencies, abandoning the euro. On this point, which is contentious due to the confrontation of opposing positions within the European left, Varoufakis rejected a return of sovereignty to nation-states. He argued for the main goal of the movement to be the repoliticisation of Europe as a unit and the democratisation of its institutions as a way of dealing with tendencies of separation, fragmentation, competition and isolation.

Varoufakis was harshly criticized by conservatives for his initiative, notably German conservatives. In an article entitled "Varoufakis' kleine Internationale gegen Kapitalismus" ("Varoufakis' little International against capitalism"), the conservative German newspaper Die Welt suggested that Varoufakis' proposals "would shatter Europe apart rather than cure it". In its note on the launching of DiEM25, the paper suggests that this initiative was a product of Varoufakis being "embittered" by the rejection of his ideas. According to the article, Varoufakis could not have been able to accept that his colleagues had not wanted to follow him and would have concluded that he needed international alliances since he had not been able to impose himself at the national level.

Right after the Russian invasion of Ukraine, the Polish left-wing party, Lewica Razem, officially opted out of the movement. They argued that neither DiEM25 nor the Progressive International "explicitly declared recognition of Ukraine's right to sovereignty or [..] condemnation of Russian imperialism".

== Reaction to the war between Israel and Hamas in Gaza ==
The DiEM25 launched a petition demanding Israel's suspension from world sports "until it fully complies with international law and sports regulations." The petition says "The International Olympic Committee, FIFA, UEFA, FIBA, and other sports organisations are complicit as they allow a continuous participation of the occupying apartheid regime in their events". The letter comes amid a letter published by Irish Member of the European Parliament, Chris MacManus and signed by several MEPs, calling on FIFA, UEFA and "all other competent bodies to take decisive action." DiEM25 has compared Israel's actions to Russia's actions in invading Ukraine in 2022, which saw them widely suspended from international sports: "So on the day four, if we compare figures alone, there was 14 children as victims of war in Ukraine, and that is 14 children too many. But now we have around 14,000 Palestinian children who have been killed in this invasion or aggression on Gaza, And there is no action, there is no condemnation from FIFA, from UEFA, from IOC or anybody. " In November 2024, DiEM25 members voted to officially adopt the Boycott Divestment Sanctions (BDS) movement's principles for their organisation.

== Prominent members or former members ==
- Yanis Varoufakis (Greece)
- Rui Tavares (Portugal)
- Srećko Horvat (Croatia)
- Lorenzo Marsili (Italy)
- Noam Chomsky (United States) (signed manifesto and endorsed)
- Ada Colau (Spain)
- Brian Eno (United Kingdom)
- Julien Bayou (France)
- Jean-Michel Jarre (France)
- James K. Galbraith (United States)
- Susan George (United States/France)
- Boris Groys (Germany)
- Ken Loach (United Kingdom)
- Antonio Negri (Italy)
- Baltasar Garzón (Spain)
- Saskia Sassen (United States/Netherlands)
- Mikuláš Peksa (Czech Republic)
- Slavoj Žižek (Slovenia)
- Agnieszka Dziemianowicz-Bąk (Poland)
- Federico Mayor Zaragoza (Spain)
- Aleksandar Novaković (Serbia)
- Pamela Anderson (Canada/United States)
- Gaspar Llamazares (Spain)
- John McDonnell (United Kingdom)
- Dušan Pajović (Montenegro)

== See also ==
- New Deal (France)
