= Andrej Grubačić =

World-system historian and anarchist theorist

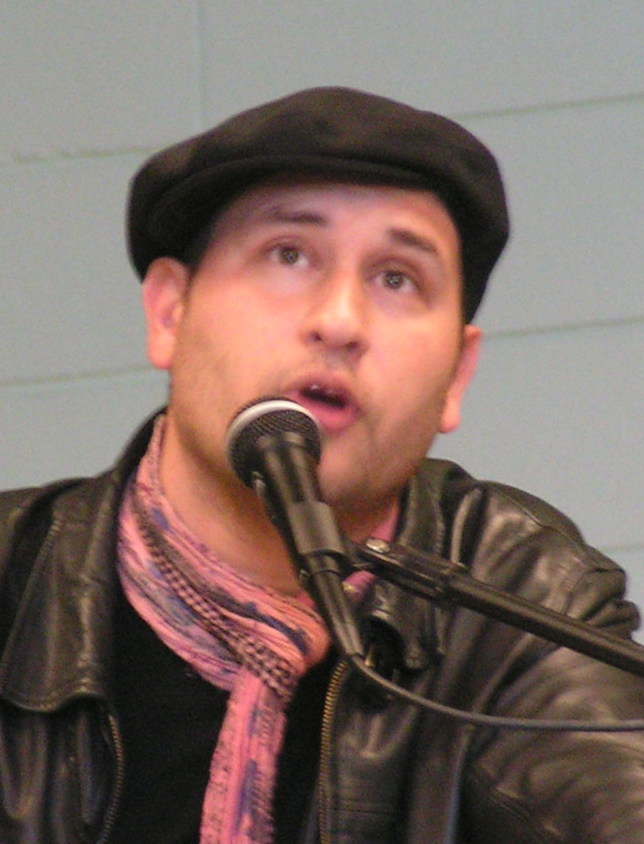
- Grubačić at the 2010 Bay Area Anarchist Bookfair
- Born: 1976 (age 49–50)
- Spouse: Renata Ávila Pinto
- Children: Tanja Grubačić Pinto

Academic background
- Education: State University of New York at Binghamton
- Thesis: Exilic spaces and practices in the modern world system

Academic work
- Discipline: World-systems theory
- Institutions: California Institute of Integral Studies

Andrej Grubačić (born 1976) is a Yugoslav world historian, world-systems theorist, and activist based in the United States.

== Career ==
Grubačić is a professor at the California Institute of Integral Studies and founded its Department of Anthropology and Social Change. Grubačić edits the Journal of World-Systems Research. He is Affiliated Faculty at the UC Berkeley Center for Social Medicine.

After the premature death of his friend and colleague David Graeber, Grubačić remains one of the exponents of the anarchist anthropology research perspective, and the department he founded at the CIIS is the only academic institute in the United States dedicated exclusively to the study of anarchist anthropology. Living at the Edges of Capitalism, which Grubačić co-authored with Denis O'Hearn, won the 2017 American Sociological Association's Political Economy of the World-System Book Award.

Grubačić's work is a synthesis of Braudelian history, Hegelian Marxism, and the anarchist anthropology of Peter Kropotkin. Together with John Holloway and several other dissident academics, Grubačić has assembled a global federation of activist scholars and academic programs "inhabiting the cracks in academia".

Grubačić is a member of the Retort collective and has participated in grassroots alter-globalization movement and has supported international projects in Yugoslavia and Rojava.

== Books ==
- Grubačić, Andrej, & O'Hearn, Denis (2016). Living at the edges of capitalism: Adventures in exile and mutual aid. University of California Press. ISBN 9780520287303.
- Grubačić, Andrej (2010). Don't Mourn, Balkanize!: Essays After Yugoslavia. PM Press.
- Lynd, Staughton & Grubačić, Andrej (2010) From Here to There: The Staughton Lynd Reader. PM Press.
- Grubačić, Andrej; Lynd, Staughton (2008). Wobblies and Zapatistas: Conversations on Anarchism, Marxism and Radical History. PM Press. ISBN 978-1-60486-041-2.
- Grubačić, Andrej (2003). Globalizacija nepristajanja [The globalization of refusal] (in Serbian). Novi Sad: Svetovi. ISBN 86-7047-422-0. OCLC 64097747.
- Noam Comski, Politika bez Moci. Izdavac: DAF Zagreb, 2004. ISBN 953-6956-01-2.
