= MeRA25 =

Greek left-wing political party

European Realistic Disobedience Front Μέτωπο Ευρωπαϊκής Ρεαλιστικής Ανυπακοής Μétopo Evropaikís Realistikís Anypakoís
- Abbreviation: MeRA25
- General Secretary: Yanis Varoufakis
- Spokesperson: Kleon Grigoriadis
- Founded: 27 March 2018
- Headquarters: Patision 122, Athens, Greece
- Youth wing: Youth MeRA25
- Ideology: Anti-austerity; Syndicalism; Market socialism Democratic socialism Pro-Europeanism
- Political position: Left-wing
- International affiliation: Progressive International
- European political alliance: DiEM25
- Colours: Orange-red
- Hellenic Parliament: 0 / 300
- European Parliament (Greece): 0 / 21

Website
- mera25.gr

The European Realistic Disobedience Front (Greek: Μέτωπο Ευρωπαϊκής Ρεαλιστικής Ανυπακοής), or MeRA25 (Greek: ΜέΡΑ25), Unifying Left (Ενωτική Αριστερά), is a left-wing Greek political party founded in 2018. Its founder and General Secretary is former Syriza MP and Finance Minister Yanis Varoufakis. MeRa25 is part of the Democracy in Europe Movement 2025 (DiEM25), the European Spring, and the Progressive International. The movement sets the horizon for the year 2025 to draft a democratic constitution that will replace all the European treaties that are in force today. Yet, it failed to elect representatives in the 2019 and 2024 European Parliament election. A party of the same name (MERA25), allied with the Greek party, was founded in Germany in 2021.

== History ==
MeRA25 was founded on 27 March 2018 by former Greek Minister of Finance Yanis Varoufakis. The party's formation was announced during a special event in Athens. In December 2018, former Syriza member and MEP Sofia Sakorafa joined the party.

The party contested the 2019 European Parliament election as part of DiEM25. It narrowly failed to win a European Parliament seat. In the 2019 Greek parliamentary elections, MeRA25 gained nine seats and 3.44% of the vote.

MeRA25 stood in the May 2023 Greek parliamentary election as part of the "Alliance for Rupture", a coalition with fellow left-wing party Popular Unity, with "For the first time, rupture" as its primary slogan. The party received less than the 3% vote share required to obtain seats in the Hellenic Parliament, with party leader Yanis Varoufakis releasing a statement blaming Syriza's leadership for the conservative victory and stating that "Our own defeat tonight will be put under the microscope of our rigorous self-criticism". In the following June snap election, MeRA25's vote share declined further, ending with 2.5% of the vote, with Varoufakis releasing another statement blaming the result on the lack of a progressive front, claiming the result was "disproving the narrative that MeRA25 is falling apart" and stating that "Never have our people needed such a Left in Parliament more than they do now. And never will such a Left be missing more from Parliament". MeRA25 stood in the 2024 European Parliament election, where it failed to elect an MEP or reach the 3% mark by an even larger margin than the 2019 election but with a slightly smaller margin than the June 2023 election.

== Name ==
Without capitalization, the letters of ΜέΡΑ25, μέρα (mera), spell the Greek word for "day", mirroring the Latin diem and thus showing the party's connection with DiEM25.

== Policies and Positions ==
The party presents itself as an alliance of "Left, Green, and Liberal Greeks", standing on the grounds of European internationalism, economic rationality, and social emancipation. It plans to introduce a "European Green New Deal" to solve the postmodern version of the Great Depression.

=== 14 Points of Dialogue and Political Axes MeRA25 ===
MeRA25’s framework outlines the party’s current programmatic priorities as follows:

1. Taxes and Cost of Living: Radical reforms to the tax system and measures against oligopolistic price-setting to benefit all income groups.
2. Energy: Immediate abolition of the Energy Exchange and creation of a public, decentralized, socialized system of green energy production and distribution.
3. Environment and Extractives: Ban on hydrocarbon extraction, protection of natural and public spaces, and no new onshore wind farms.
4. Workplace Democracy: Strengthening collective bargaining and promoting cooperative ownership models (“one share – one worker – one vote”). Ensuring that workers have a direct voice and equal decision-making power in the management and profits of their workplace.
5. Housing: Abolishing the “Hercules” scheme, creating a public body for non-performing loans, and establishing a Social Housing Authority ensuring affordable, secure housing and protection from predatory banking practices.
6. Public Health and Education: Citizen-led governance of health and education, with permanent hirings beyond austerity restrictions.
7. Public Media: Citizen-led governance of state media through councils of randomly selected citizens and elected representatives, along with strengthened independent authorities, ensures quality, fairness, and journalistic independence.
8. Democratic Sovereignty: Socialisation and public ownership of key state institutions such as the Independent Authority for Public Revenue, ELSTAT, the Hellenic Corporation of Assets and Participations, and the Hellenic Financial Stability Fund.
9. Public Payments and Banking: Creation of a free public digital payments system and a public agricultural-development bank to end private banking monopolies, lower transaction costs, improve access to credit for farmers and small enterprises, and support rural economic development.
10. Foreign Policy: Closure of foreign military bases, disengagement from NATO, withdrawal from regional military extractive alliances, and promotion of peace in the region helping reassert national sovereignty, reduce involvement in foreign conflicts, limit military entanglements driven by resource interests, and promote a peaceful role for Greece in regional and international affairs.
11. Gender and LGBTQ+ Rights: Protection from gender-based and domestic violence and opposition to mandatory joint custody ensuring the safety and rights of women and LGBTQ+ individuals, preventing abuse on the basis of sexuality and gender and protecting victims from being forced into harmful custody arrangements.
12. Refugee and Migrant Rights: Full protection of asylum rights and opposition to violence at borders and deaths at sea ensuring that refugees and migrants can safely exercise their right to seek asylum, free from violence, pushbacks, or life-threatening conditions at borders and at sea.
13. Basic Income: Guarantee of food and housing as the first step toward a dignified universal basic income ensuring that every resident’s basic needs are met, reducing poverty and insecurity.
14. Security: Ensure the safety and well-being of citizens through public services and protections rather than through authoritarian measures or militarisation. Defined not by repression but by effective civil protection, strong public health care, accessible public transport, and non-involvement in wars.

=== Other policies ===
- Ban deportation and administrative detention of vulnerable groups, such as people with disabilities, unaccompanied minors, pregnant women, people over 65, persons with serious health issues, victims of torture or sexual violence.
- No more onshore wind turbines on mountain peaks; develop energy parks in remote areas with minimal environmental impact.
- Do not allocate productive farmland for solar farms; instead use roofs of farm buildings, barns, storage for PV installations.
- Create small hydroelectric dams to provide 24-hour renewable power, support irrigation and rural agriculture; also infrastructure improvements such as land reclamation, anti-flood works, etc.
- Commitment to phase out fossil fuel dependency by 2040.
- Reverse the devaluation / selloff of key public industrial enterprises, e.g., LARCO, DEPA, and other public utilities or companies with public goods.
- Oppose any privatization of water and ensure water remains a public good; guarantee access.
- Public transport must be public: ownership, operation, and infrastructure under public or socially controlled ownership.
- Stronger independent authorities to oversee quality and fairness in media.
- Closure of foreign military bases in Greece.
- Guarantee of food and housing as first stage of a universal basic income.
- Expansion of welfare protections.
- Ban on genetically modified organisms (GMOs).
- Restructuring the national debt
- Reducing primary surplus
- Creating a public debt restructuring company
- The general reduction of tax rates
- Creating a public digital payment platform
- Converting HRADF into a development bank
- Respecting paid work and creative entrepreneurship

== MeRA25 Initiatives and Plans ==
=== ODYSSEAS (ΟΔΥΣΣΕΑΣ) Plan – Public Debt Management ===
The ODYSSEAS (ΟΔΥΣΣΕΑΣ) plan is a public initiative proposed by ΜέΡΑ25 to manage non-performing loans in Greece and protect primary residences and small- to medium-sized business properties from foreclosures and auctions. It is designed to replace the existing “Hercules” scheme, which allows private funds to buy distressed loans at low prices and profit from property seizures. ODYSSEAS (ΟΔΥΣΣΕΑΣ) aims to prevent the extraction of wealth to international funds while safeguarding households and small businesses from losing their homes or workplaces.

Under the plan, a new public debt management company would take over non-performing loans, freeze interest, and provide permanent protection for borrowers. Property owners would pay a monthly fixed fee, capped at 20% of net income, with the option for lower payments for low-income households. The plan ensures long-term, socially fair management of debt, preserves ownership rights, and eliminates excessive surcharges and compound interest.

=== DIMITRA (ΔΗΜΗΤΡΑ) – Public Digital Transaction System ===
DIMITRA (ΔΗΜΗΤΡΑ) is a proposed public system for free digital transactions in euros, enabling payments between citizens, businesses, and the state. It aims to reduce transaction costs imposed by banks, providing households and small businesses with a low-cost alternative for everyday payments. Users would access the system via an account linked to their tax identification number (ΑΦΜ), with a secure PIN for transactions.

The system allows instant, fee-free transfers and also offers targeted social policy measures, allowing the state to credit specific groups, such as low-income households or the unemployed. DIMITRA (ΔΗΜΗΤΡΑ) is designed to reduce the impact of potential banking crises by providing an alternative payment network.

=== Greek Green Industrial Revolution Plan ===
The plan proposes a multi-sector industrial strategy focused on green energy and sustainable development. Central to this vision is hydrogen, which produces only water when burned and can be generated using renewable electricity and water. Northern Greece, anchored on the ports of Alexandroupolis and Thessaloniki, is positioned as a major Mediterranean hub for hydrogen production and distribution, using offshore wind farms that avoid disrupting fishing areas or local views.

The plan includes domestic production of offshore wind turbines, large-scale battery storage systems, carbon capture in decommissioned mines, and emerging renewable energy storage technologies. It emphasizes public oversight, local community participation, and joint ventures with international companies to create high-quality jobs and reduce greenhouse gas emissions.

=== New Trade Unionism Plan ===
The plan calls for a modern, independent, and democratic trade union movement free from party control and small factional interests. It critiques current issues such as fragmentation, political influence, bureaucratic procedures, employer-controlled unions, declining participation, and the exclusion of vulnerable workers such as the unemployed, immigrants, and informal laborers.

Proposed reforms include rotation and term limits for representatives, use of technology for transparent communication, participatory decision-making for collective agreements, integration of unemployed and retired workers, and reduction of redundant union layers. It also promotes universal basic income, fair wages, minimum living wage, linking work hours to automation, and participatory ownership structures funding basic income initiatives.

=== Vision for Local and Regional Government ===
The plan presents a vision for local and regional government that is democratic, participatory, public, green, inclusive, and independent from party control. It addresses challenges from prolonged economic crises, centralized governance, underfunding, bureaucracy, and concentration of power in committees and development agencies rather than elected councils.

Key proposals include strengthening municipal and regional councils, implementing participatory budgets and citizen legislative initiatives, maintaining public services under public control, protecting public green spaces, promoting circular economy and sustainable urban planning, supporting social and cultural inclusion, and emphasizing gender equality and anti-racist, feminist, and anti-fascist principles in local governance.

== Election results ==
=== Hellenic Parliament ===
| Election | Hellenic Parliament | | | | | Rank | Government | Leader |
| Election | Votes | % | ±pp | Seats won | +/− | Rank | Government | Leader |
|---|---|---|---|---|---|---|---|---|
| 2019 | 194,232 | 3.44% | New | 9 / 300 | New | 6th | Opposition | Yanis Varoufakis |
| May 2023 | 155,085 | 2.63% | −0.81 | 0 / 300 | ▼9 | 8th | Extra-parliamentary | Yanis Varoufakis |
| Jun 2023 | 130,276 | 2.50% | −0.13 | 0 / 300 | 0 | 9th | Extra-parliamentary | Yanis Varoufakis |

=== European Parliament ===
European Parliament
| Election | Votes | % | ±pp | Seats won | +/− | Rank | Leader | EP Group |
|---|---|---|---|---|---|---|---|---|
| 2019 | 162,328 | <3.00% (Note: 49 votes below 3%) | New | 0 / 21 | New | 7th | Yanis Varoufakis | − |
| 2024 | 101,127 | 2.54% | -0.45 | 0 / 21 | 0 | 9th | Yanis Varoufakis | − |

== Notable Supporters ==
Several prominent individuals have publicly expressed support for MeRA25, highlighting its progressive agenda and anti-austerity platform.

Naomi Klein, Norman Finkelstein, and Roger Waters have endorsed MeRA25, particularly emphasizing its stance on social justice and European democracy.

Julian Assange, founder of WikiLeaks, has been a vocal supporter of MeRA25 and its affiliated movement DiEM25, advocating for the nullification of his U.S. extradition request.

Slavoj Žižek, the Slovenian philosopher, has publicly expressed solidarity with MeRA25, emphasizing its mission to challenge the political status quo.

== See also ==
- Anti-austerity movement in Greece
- Civil disobedience
- Civil resistance
- Democracy in Europe Movement 2025
- European United Left–Nordic Green Left
