= Renata Ávila Pinto =

Guatemalan lawyer and activist

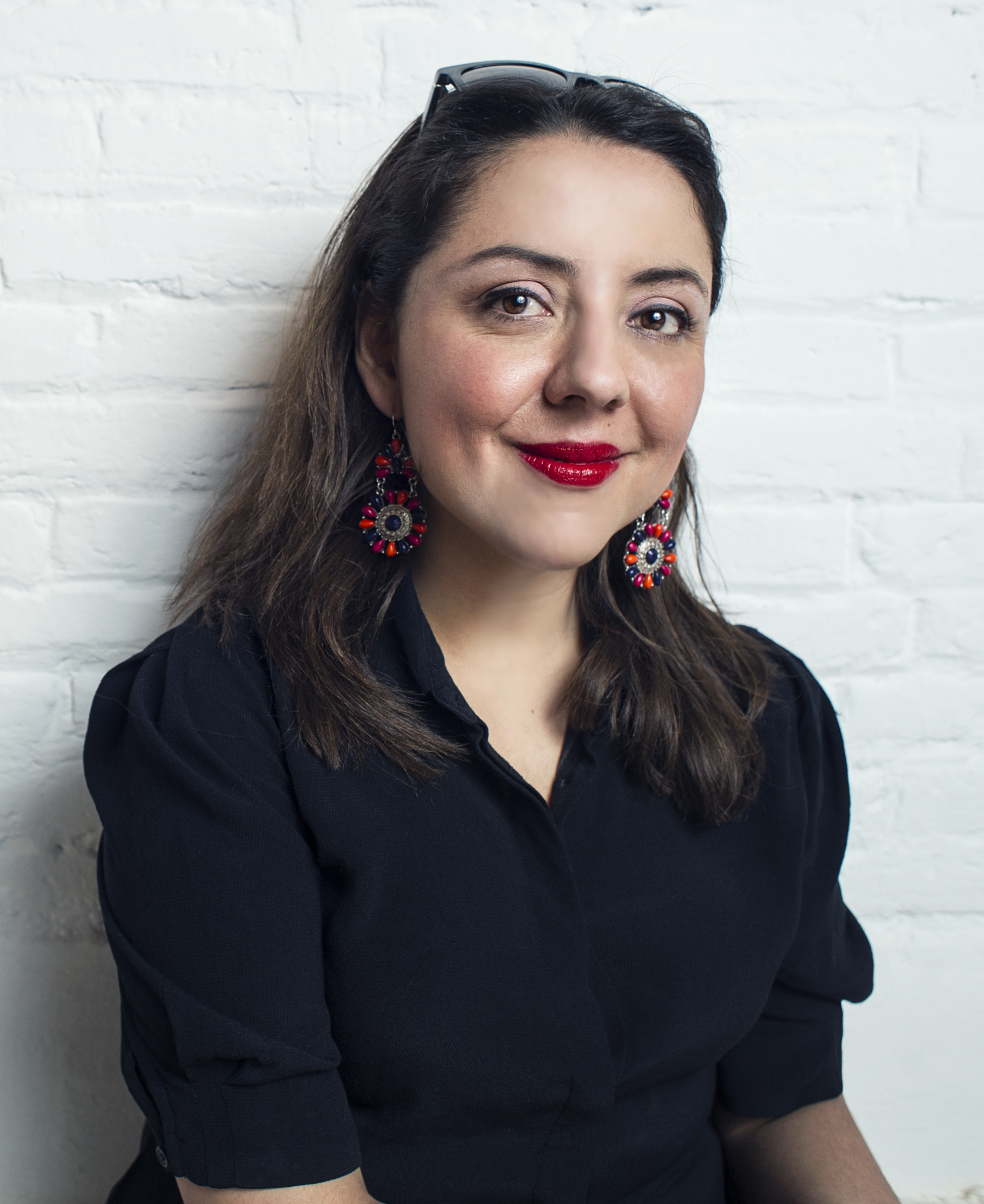
- Born: 1 January 1981 (age 44); Guatemala
- Education: Universidad Francisco Marroquín; University of Turin
- Occupation: Lawyer
- Organizations: Creative Commons; DiEM25; OKFN
- Spouse: Andrej Grubačić
- Children: Tanja Grubačić Pinto

Renata Ávila Pinto (born 1 January 1981) is a Guatemalan attorney and activist specializing in technology and intellectual property. She is a spokesperson and part of the team that defends Julian Assange and WikiLeaks, under the direction of Baltasar Garzón. Since October 2021 she has been the CEO of the UK-based Open Knowledge Foundation.

She was a defender of survivors of genocide and other human rights abuses in Guatemala, and was part of the legal team led by the Spanish lawyer Almudena Bernabeu in the case of Rigoberta Menchú against Efraín Ríos Montt.

She is a member of the board of directors of Creative Commons, an international organization that advocates for open knowledge and libre culture. She is also a board member of Democracy in Europe Movement 2025 (DiEM25), a pan-European initiative launched by former Greek finance minister and economist Yanis Varoufakis, which seeks to democratize the European Union.

== Career ==
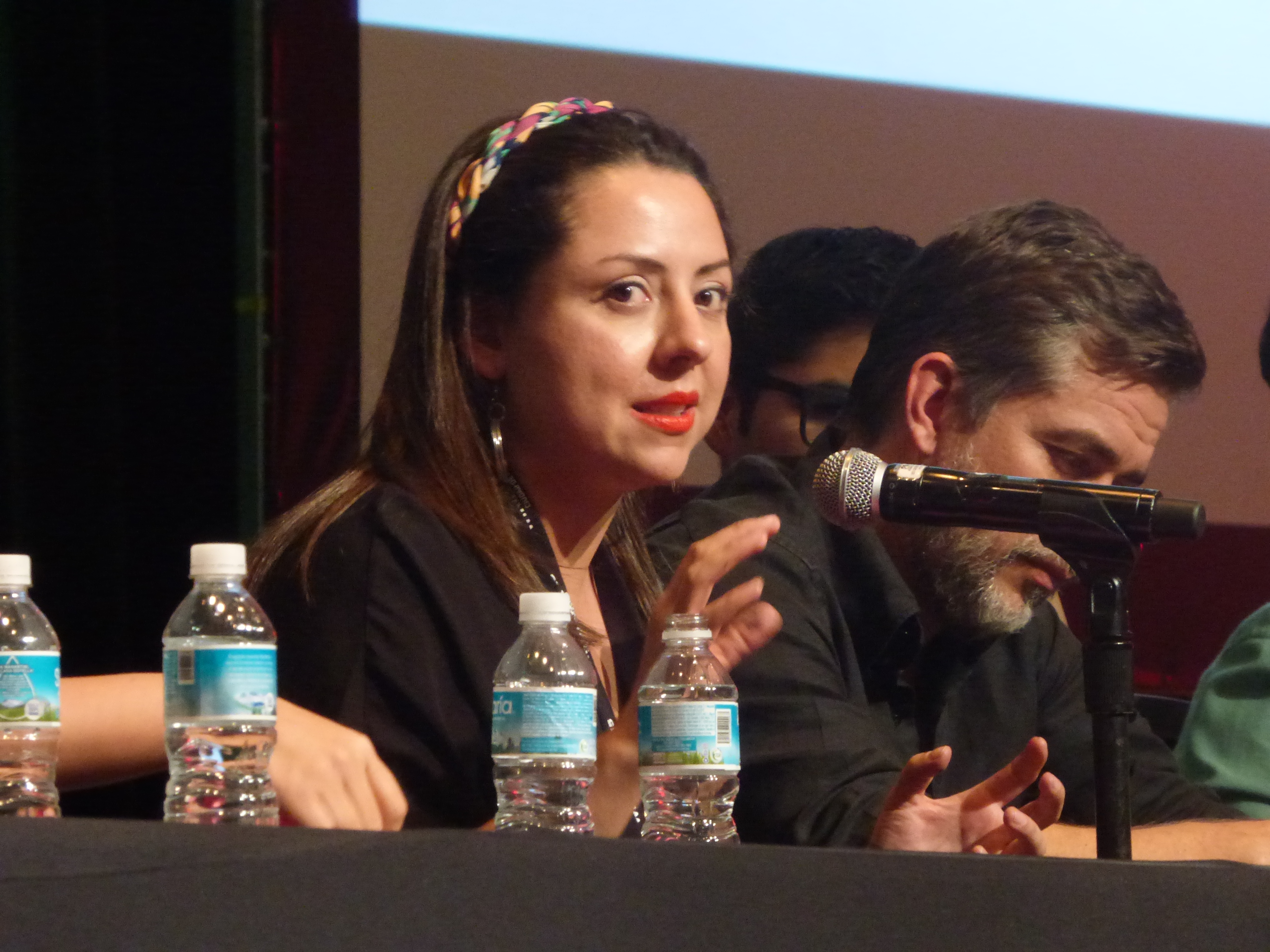
At the Latin America Internet Freedoms Panel in 2015

Renata Ávila Pinto holds a licentiate in law from the Universidad Francisco Marroquín in Guatemala and has a master's degree in law from the University of Turin, as well as studies in international law in The Hague.

She was part of the international legal team that represented the victims of genocide and other crimes against humanity in their extradition case before the National Court of Spain, including the prominent indigenous leader and Nobel Peace Prize winner Rigoberta Menchú. She has also been a legal advisor to various whistleblowers and journalists, alongside the lawyer Baltasar Garzón. After it was reported that Daniel Domscheit-Berg deleted WikiLeaks submissions, she wrote an open letter in 2011 asking what happened to documents she gave to WikiLeaks allegedly "detailing proof of torture and government abuse of a Latin America country".

As a digital rights activist, she has denounced the deterioration of net neutrality, mass surveillance, and attacks on freedom of expression on the Internet. For five years she was chief digital rights advisor at the World Wide Web Foundation. Along with founder Tim Berners-Lee, she led the Web We Want campaign, promoting respect for human rights in the digital era in more than 75 countries. In 2018 she was appointed Executive Director of the Intelligent Citizenship Foundation, an organization that promotes the openness of data and its use in favor of society in Latin America, based in Chile and Brazil.

Ávila is a member of the Creative Commons board and was a trustee of the Courage Foundation. She also serves as a member of the DECODE advisory board and the University of Amsterdam's Data Activism project. She is part of the coordinating collective of DiEM25, which explores the potential of decentralized technologies in Europe.

She has written for media outlets such as eldiario.es, Global Voices, and openDemocracy, as well as for various academic publications and international periodicals. She appeared in the documentaries ForEveryone.Net (2015), Risk (2016), and Hacking Justice (2017).

The book Women, Whistleblowing, Wikileaks: A Conversation, which she co-wrote with Sarah Harrison and Angela Richter, covers women who have played an active role in WikiLeaks, but who have not had proportionate media coverage.

In 2014, she was one of the participants in the creation of the Brazilian Civil Rights Framework for the Internet in order to implement legislation to protect net neutrality.

In 2020, she cofounded the Geneva-based Polylateral Association and currently serves as its president.

== Publications ==
- "Mapping Digital Media: Guatemala" (January 2014), Open Society Foundations, with Alejandra Gutiérrez Valdizán
- Women, Whistleblowing, WikiLeaks: A Conversation (2017), OR Books, ISBN 9781682191170, with Sarah Harrison and Angela Richter
