= Srećko Horvat =

Croatian philosopher (born 1983)

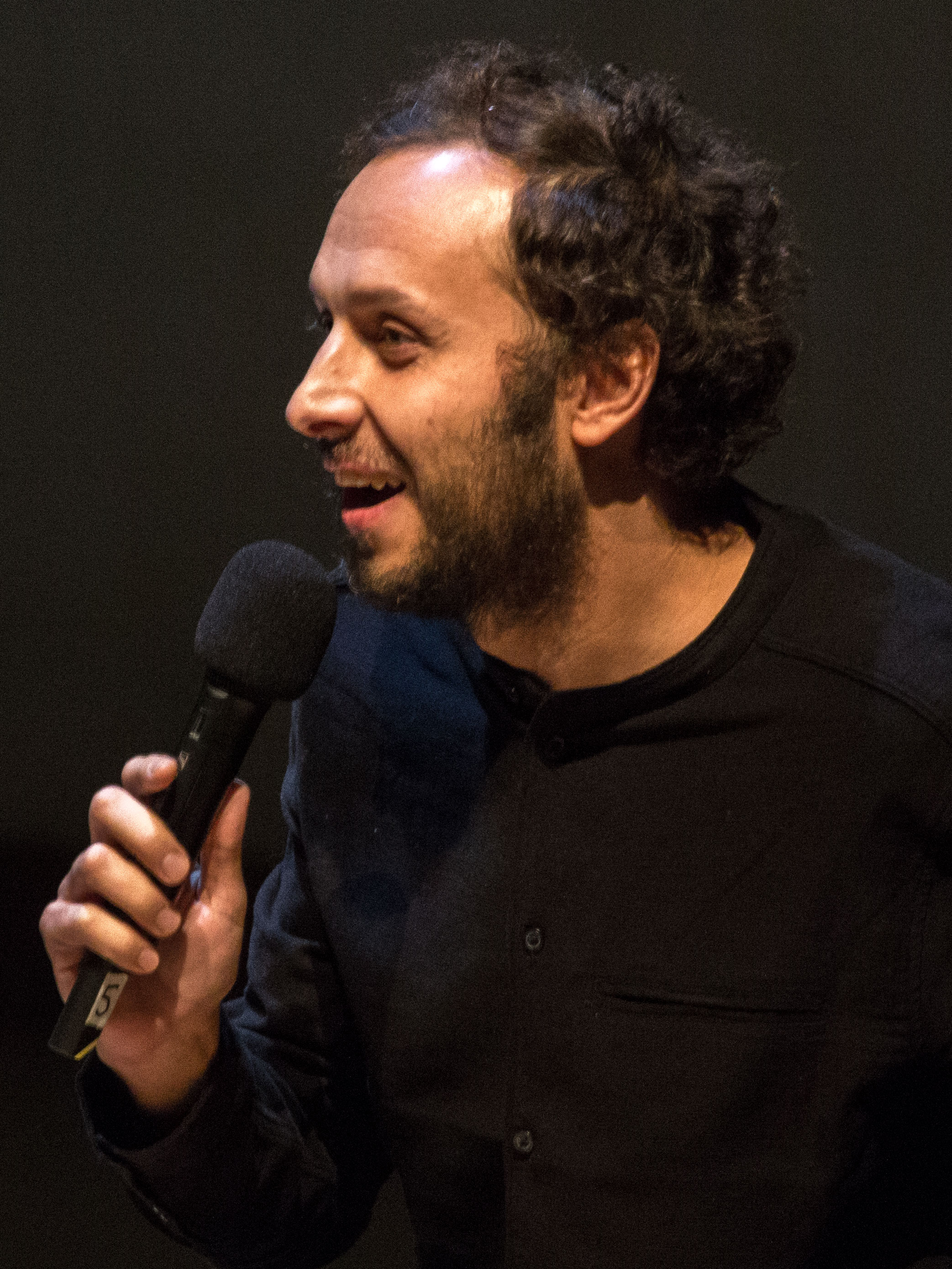
- Horvat in 2018
- Born: 28 February 1983 (age 43); Osijek, SR Croatia, Yugoslavia (now Osijek, Croatia)

Philosophical work
- Era: Contemporary philosophy
- Region: Western philosophy
- School: Continental philosophy
- Main interests: Poststructuralism; Ideology; Political theory; Film theory; Marxism

Srećko Horvat (born 28 February 1983) is a Croatian philosopher, author and political activist. The German weekly Der Freitag called him "one of the most exciting voices of his generation" and he has been described as a "fiery voice of dissent in the Post-Yugoslav landscape". His writing has appeared in The Guardian, Al Jazeera, Der Spiegel, Jacobin, Newsweek, and The New York Times.

== Life ==
Horvat was born in Osijek, Croatia, but lived the first eight years of his life in Germany before returning to Croatia in 1991. After returning to Croatia, he was involved in the hardcore punk scene of the 1990s, graduated with a degree in philosophy and general linguistics at the Faculty of Philosophy in Zagreb, started writing for Croatian magazines such as Zarez and, prior to his twenty-sixth birthday, published two books, Protiv političke korektnosti (Against Political Correctness) and Znakovi postmodernog grada (Signs of the Postmodern City) in Croatia and Serbia. Since then, he has written multiple books in both Croatian and English (Poetry from the Future, The Radicality of Love and Subversion!), many of which have been translated into other languages, among them Chinese, Korean, Spanish, Turkish and German. In 2008, he co-founded the Subversive Festival, where he served as programme director until 2013. In 2016, he co-founded, with Yanis Varoufakis, the Democracy in Europe Movement 2025, on whose Coordinating Collective he presently sits as a member.

== Political thought and activity ==
Horvat is regarded as one of the "central figures of the new left in post-Yugoslavia". He has participated in different activist movements across the world, including the 2009 student protests in Croatia, Occupy Wall Street in 2011 and World Social Forum in Senegal and Tunisia. He has visited the 2017 G20 Hamburg summit which he described as a "dystopian nightmare", claiming that "the real problem is the dogmatic slumber of the leaders of the free world, represented at this G20 summit by Merkel, May and others, which is the origin of our current dystopian nightmare (wars, terrorism, the refugee crisis and climate change)". Since 2016, he has claimed that "the need for a progressive international movement was never as urgent as today". Asked about what the Facebook–Cambridge Analytica data scandal meant for the future of politics, he claims that "in the near future this will be remembered as the early days of a much more radical transformation of what we understand under politics". In 2017, Horvat signed the Declaration on the Common Language of the Croats, Serbs, Bosniaks and Montenegrins.

== Subversive Festival ==
Horvat was one of the founders of the Subversive Festival in 2008, an annual festival which included Oliver Stone, Alexis Tsipras, Aleida Guevara, Slavoj Žižek, Tariq Ali, Zygmunt Bauman, David Harvey and Saskia Sassen, among others. In 2013, he along with the programme team left the Subversive Festival "due to differences in understanding the goals and direction of the activist platforms within Subversive Forum and, more generally, the general purpose of Subversive Festival". The influence and significance of the Subversive Festival was often paralleled to the Praxis School, the Marxist humanist philosophical movement that originated in the SFR Yugoslavia during the 1960s. In 2017, Horvat published the book Subversion! which the American linguist and social critic Noam Chomsky praised as a book "based on rich personal experience and participation in constructive subversion, along with wide reading from classics to the latest dreams of artificial intelligence". According to Chomsky, "Horvat leads us on a whirlwind tour of the maladies and discontents of modern civilization and the many ways to right what is wrong and achieve a better future".

== Philosophical Theatre ==
In 2014, Horvat launched a project called Philosophical Theatre (Filozofski Teatar) at Croatian National Theatre in Zagreb. The underlying idea was to re-establish the close relationship between philosophy and theatre. It is a monthly series of public debates with thinkers and artists. His guests included M.I.A., Vanessa Redgrave, Margarethe von Trotta, Adam Curtis, Herta Müller, Hito Steyerl, Mladen Dolar, Julia Kristeva, Eva Illouz, Tariq Ali, Bobby Gillespie, Thomas Piketty and others. According to the Croatian National Theatre, the number of visitors of the programme from 2014 to 2018 was around 20,000.

== Cancellation of Sane Society television programme ==
In 2013, Horvat was the host and author of an intellectual TV show on Croatian National Television called Zdravo Društvo (Sane Society) which tried to recreate the Balkan cultural space and hosted many intellectuals such as Renata Salecl, Rade Šerbedžija, Andrej Nikolaidis and Viktor Ivančić, among others. Officially, it was called off by the management because of "austerity measures". However, the Bosnian writer Miljenko Jergović wrote that the TV show likely would not have been removed if not for an opinion piece Horvat wrote in The Guardian that criticised an anti-gay-marriage referendum and more generally the movement of Croatian society in a culturally conservative if not fascistic direction. Jergović wrote: "If he had written it in 1942 he would've ended up in Jasenovac concentration camp. If he had written it in 1972 he would've ended up in Lepoglava prison. But in 2014 he only lost his TV show because he wrote the truth about Croatia".

== Bibliography ==
=== In English ===
- What does Europe want? The Union and its Discontents (with Slavoj Žižek), Istros Books, 2013
- Welcome to the Desert of Postsocialism (with Igor Štiks), Verso, 2014
- The Radicality of Love, Polity Press, 2015
- Subversion!, Zero Books, 2017
- Poetry from the Future, Penguin, 2019
- After the Apocalypse, Polity Press, 2021

=== In French ===
- "Sauvons-nous de nos sauveurs", Éditions Lignes, 2013

=== In German ===
- Nach dem Ende der Geschichte Laika-Verlag, Hamburg, 2013
- Was will Europa? – Rettet uns vor den Rettern (with Slavoj Žižek) Laika-Verlag, Hamburg, 2013

=== In Croatian ===
- Znakovi postmodernog grada Jesenski i Turk, Zagreb, 2007
- Protiv političke korektnosti. Od Kramera do Laibacha, i natrag, Biblioteka XX. Vek, Beograd, 2007.
- Budućnost je ovdje Svijet distopijskog filma, HFS, Zagreb, 2008
- Totalitarizam danas Antibarbarus, Zagreb, 2008
- Diskurs terorizma AGM, Zagreb, 2008
- Ljubav za početnike Naklada Ljevak, Zagreb, 2009
- Pravo na pobunu (with Igor Štiks), Fraktura, Zagreb, 2010
- Pažnja! Neprijatelj prisluškuje Naklada Ljevak, Zagreb, 2011
- Što Europa želi? (with Slavoj Žižek), Algoritam, Zagreb, 2013

=== In Spanish ===
- "El Sur pide la palabra. El futuro de una Europa en crisis" (con Slavoj Žižek), Libros Del Lince (2014)
- "La radicalidad del amor", Katakrak, Pamplona (2016)
- "El discurso del terrorismo", Katakrak, Pamplona (2017)
- "¡Subversión! Conversaciones con Srećko Horvat" (con Alfie Bown), Katakrak, Pamplona (2019)
- "Poesía del futuro", Paidós, Barcelona (2020)
- "¡Todo debe cambiar!" (con Renata Ávila), Rayo Verde Editorial (2021)
- "Después del apocalipsis", Katakrak, Pamplona (2021)

=== In Catalan ===
- Després de l'apocalipsi, Arcàdia, Barcelona (2021)

== Articles ==
- "Welcome to the Desert of Transition", Monthly Review, March 2012
- "Croatia - the latest member of the EU periphery", The Guardian, July 2013
- "Croatia - a sign of the rotten heart of Europe, The Guardian, December 2013
- "Ukraine's fallen statues of Lenin", The Guardian, March 2014
- "First World War: was Gavrilo Princip a terrorist or freedom fighter?", The Guardian, April 2014
- "Why are the Balkans boiling again?", Al Jazeera, February 2014
- "It's the Libidinal Economy, stupid!", Al Jazeera, January 2014
- "Godot arrives in Sarajevo", The New York Times, February 2014
- "The Future Is Here", NeMe, January 2011
