= Denis O'Hearn =

American sociology professor

- Born: Carlsbad, New Mexico, U.S.

Academic background
- Education: University of New Mexico (BA); University of Michigan (MA, MA, MA, PhD)

Academic work
- Discipline: Sociology · economics
- Sub-discipline: International political economy
- Institutions: Binghamton University; University of Texas at El Paso; University of Wisconsin–Madison; University of Notre Dame; Queen's University Belfast

Denis O'Hearn is an American politician working as a professor of sociology and anthropology at the University of Texas at El Paso.

== Early life and education ==
O'Hearn is a native of Carlsbad, New Mexico. He earned a Bachelor of Arts degree in economics from the University of New Mexico, a Master of Arts in economics, Master of Arts in sociology, Master of Arts in Russian and Eastern European studies, and PhD in sociology from the University of Michigan. He studied at the National University of Ireland as a Fulbright scholar.

== Career ==
O'Hearn previously he served as professor of sociology at Binghamton University from 2006 to 2016, chair of the Binghamton Sociology Department from 2014 to 2016, and professor of social and economic change at Queen's University Belfast from 2003 to 2008. He also held positions at the University of Wisconsin–Madison and University of Notre Dame. O'Hearn has written widely in the fields of political economy, mutual aid, isolated imprisonment, and Ireland.

== Selected publications ==
- O'Hearn, Denis (1998) Inside the Celtic Tiger: The Irish Economy and the Asian model, Pluto Press
- O'Hearn, Denis (2001) The Atlantic Economy: Britain, the US and Ireland, Manchester University Press
- O'Hearn, Denis (2000) "Globalization, 'New Tigers,' and the end of the developmental State? The case of the Celtic tiger", Politics & Society 28 (1), 67-92
