= Democracy in Motion =

Minor party in Germany

Democracy in Motion Demokratie in Bewegung
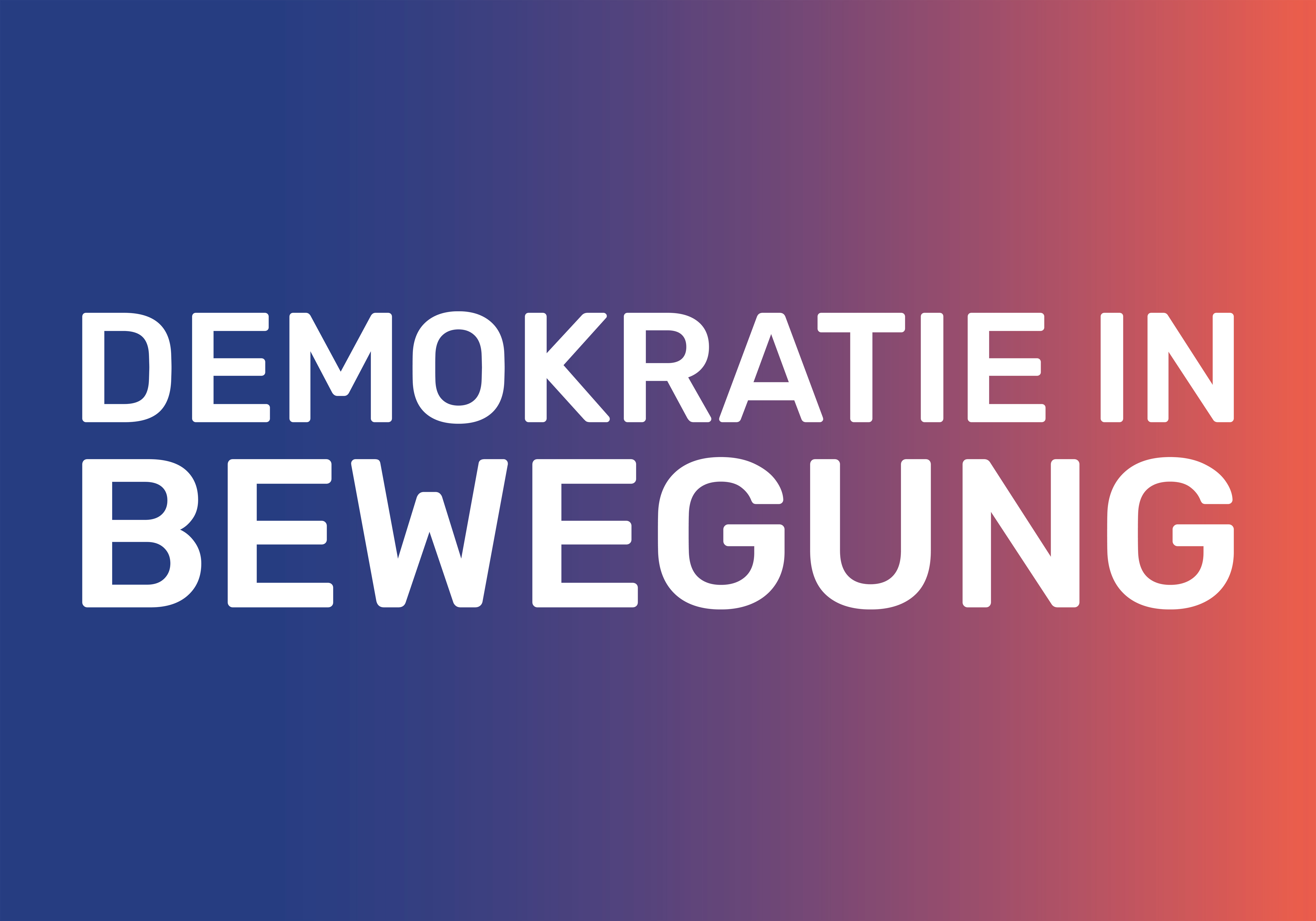
- Chairman: Sigrid Ott; Guido Drehsen
- Founded: 29 April 2017
- Dissolved: March 2025
- Headquarters: Brunnenstr. 64/65, 13355 Berlin
- Membership (July 2021): ▼224
- Ideology: Democratic socialism Alter-globalism; Eco-feminism; Pro-Europeanism
- Political position: Left-wing
- European political alliance: DiEM25; European Spring
- Colors: Blue (customary); Orange (customary)
- Bundestag: 0 / 709
- Bundesrat: 0 / 69
- State Parliaments: 0 / 1,821
- European Parliament: 0 / 96
- Prime Ministers of States: 0 / 16

Website
- www.bewegung.jetzt

Democracy in Motion (German: Demokratie in Bewegung, DiB) was a minor party in Germany. The basis for the party's founding was a petition on change.org, in which petitioners promised to run as a party in September 2017 at the federal election if the petition reached at least 100,000 signatures, which it reached on 20 July 2017. After this was accomplished, the party 'Democracy in Motion' was established on 29 April 2017 in Berlin.

In early 2025, the party congress voted to dissolve the party in March of the same year.

== Content profile ==
The Party Platform outlines four core values:

1. Democracy, participation, transparency
2. Justice on social, political, economic, and environmental issues
3. Cosmopolitanism and diversity
4. Future-oriented sustainability

Policy was adopted at the 2nd Federal Party Congress on 27 August 2017 in Cologne in accordance to the campaign requirements for the 2017 Bundestag election. The proposals for this were developed in a grassroots manner using the principle of initiative and presented to the federal party congress for a final vote. The code of ethics, an ethical commitment in accordance to core party values laying down a series of rules of conduct, is given to all new party members, "movers", and advocates (MPs).

The party has outlined, by statute, a women's quota and diversity rate.

=== Transparency and participation ===
The party believes that the introduction of a lobbying register is required in order to hinder covert influence on elected officials. The party's Code of Ethics requires its own members to disclose their ancillary income and take other measures to combat lobbying. The party does not accept donations from companies.

The party calls for more citizen participation possibilities, for example, administrative decisions should be able to be made on a federal level via referendum. Similarly, the 5 percent hurdle should be lowered to 3 percent to facilitate smaller parties being represented in the Bundestag and thus more accurately reflect the opinion of the electorate.

=== Social justice ===
Social inequality is discussed in the basic program with various measures proposed to improve conditions, including reform of Hartz IV to introduce unconditional basic income, increase of the minimum wage to €12, improved working conditions for temporary workers, and creation of a fairer, standardized, pension system.

==== Family and social equality policies ====
The party calls for the improvement of midwife profession, the development of all-day child care, and the reduction of gender pay gaps, in particular the abolition of spousal income splitting. The party also advocates the introduction of a women's quota in governing bodies. Violence against women should be combated through financial support for aid organizations and the establishment of victim protection clinics. The party is committed to the rights of disabled people and calls for more inclusion of the disabled, for example, freedom to choose how they live their lives and recognition of sign language as an official language. The party also believes in complete equality of same-sex marriage and that the equal treatment of LGBTIQ people should be anchored in the constitution.

==== Tax policy ====
The party calls for raising the tax rate on the highest income tax bracket, more effective taxation of large companies and combating tax evasion, whilst also relieving lower and middle income groups, and introducing a financial transaction tax.

==== Health policy ====
According to the party, the two-tier healthcare system should be abolished in favor of guaranteed health insurance, and having private health insurance offer additional benefits. DiB wants the health system modernized and working conditions improved, and advocate for professional active euthanasia.

=== Foreign policy ===
The party calls for giving greater power to the European Parliament, including through the introduction of right of initiative. In the long term, it advocates the establishment of a European, federal, parliamentary republic. In negotiating free trade agreements such as TTIP and CETA, the party calls for greater democratic control and transparency, including through the establishment of an ethics committee. The party calls for the creation of safe escape routes for refugees, an international fight against the causes of the flight of refugees from their countries of origin, increased funding for international development, and increased regulation, with severe limitation, of the arms industry and for it to be completely dropped in areas of conflict. Germany should end their nuclear sharing deals, and a global ban on nuclear weapons is sought.

=== Sustainability ===
With respect to sustainability the party advocates a rapid switch to renewable energies, a decentralization of energy policy, and an introduction of an emissions tax on carbon dioxide and methane to discourage air pollution thus counteract climate change. The party calls for Organic farming to be promoted; factory farming, the patenting of living organisms, the use of genetic engineering, and glyphosate in agriculture to be ended.

==== Education and digitization ====
The party calls for more money in education, and free access to daycare and universities, school education to be standardized across all federal states. DiB advocates increased digitization with greater connection of rural areas to the internet, the allowance of smaller artists to compete with larger media companies and to be able to live off of the gains from their art. The party opposes mass surveillance and is critical of computer and network surveillance, and for example, fears the development of a government Trojan horse.

==== Infrastructure ====
The party opposes privatization of public infrastructure and calls for a constitutionally anchored common carrying for the likes of electricity, telecommunications, roads and railways. DiB would counteract emigration from rural areas by increasing the quality of life in said areas, and calls for a fairer, more environmentally friendly, transport system that promotes alternatives to car use.

== Organisational structure ==
=== Party board ===
The party leaders of the party Federal Association are Alexander Plitsch and Julia Beerhold. The other members of the board are Dorothee Vogt (treasurer), Benedikt Sequeira Gerardo, Narges Lankarani, Franka Kretschmer and Lea Brunn.

=== National associations ===
There are regional associations in all 16 federal states. These were founded within five weeks of the founding of the Federal Association accordingly. Shortly after the foundation of the last state association in Rhineland-Palatinate on 4 June, state lists for the 2017 federal elections were drawn up in all 16 federal states.

=== District associations ===
The first two district associations were founded in Halle (Saale) on 18 October 2017 and one day later in Karlsruhe.

=== Members ===
The party has 379 confirmed party members (as of December 31, 2017), the proportion of women is 35%. Added to this are 785 (as of 31 December 2017) confirmed "movers" in the marketplace of ideas and the plenary of mover who actively work on the preparation of initiatives, which are, after majority vote at a federal party congress, then incorporated into the party platform.

== Election results ==
=== 2017 federal election ===
Election year	# of constituency votes	# of party list votes	% of party list vote	# of overall seats won	+/−	Notes
2017	-	60,826	0.1	0 / 709	-	
2021	2,609	7,184	0.0	0 / 736	-	

The party appeared in eight states (Bavaria, Baden-Wuerttemberg, Berlin, Hamburg, Lower Saxony, North Rhine-Westphalia, Saxony and Saxony-Anhalt) for the 2017 federal election. They won 60,826 second votes nationwide, equivalent to 0.1%. Their best results were achieved in the states of Hamburg, and Berlin; each with 0.4%. The party received her best constituency result in the constituency Friedrichshain-Kreuzberg - Prenzlauer Berg Ost in Berlin, with 0.7%.
