= Yanis Varoufakis =

Greek economist and politician (born 1961)

- Γιάνης Βαρουφάκης
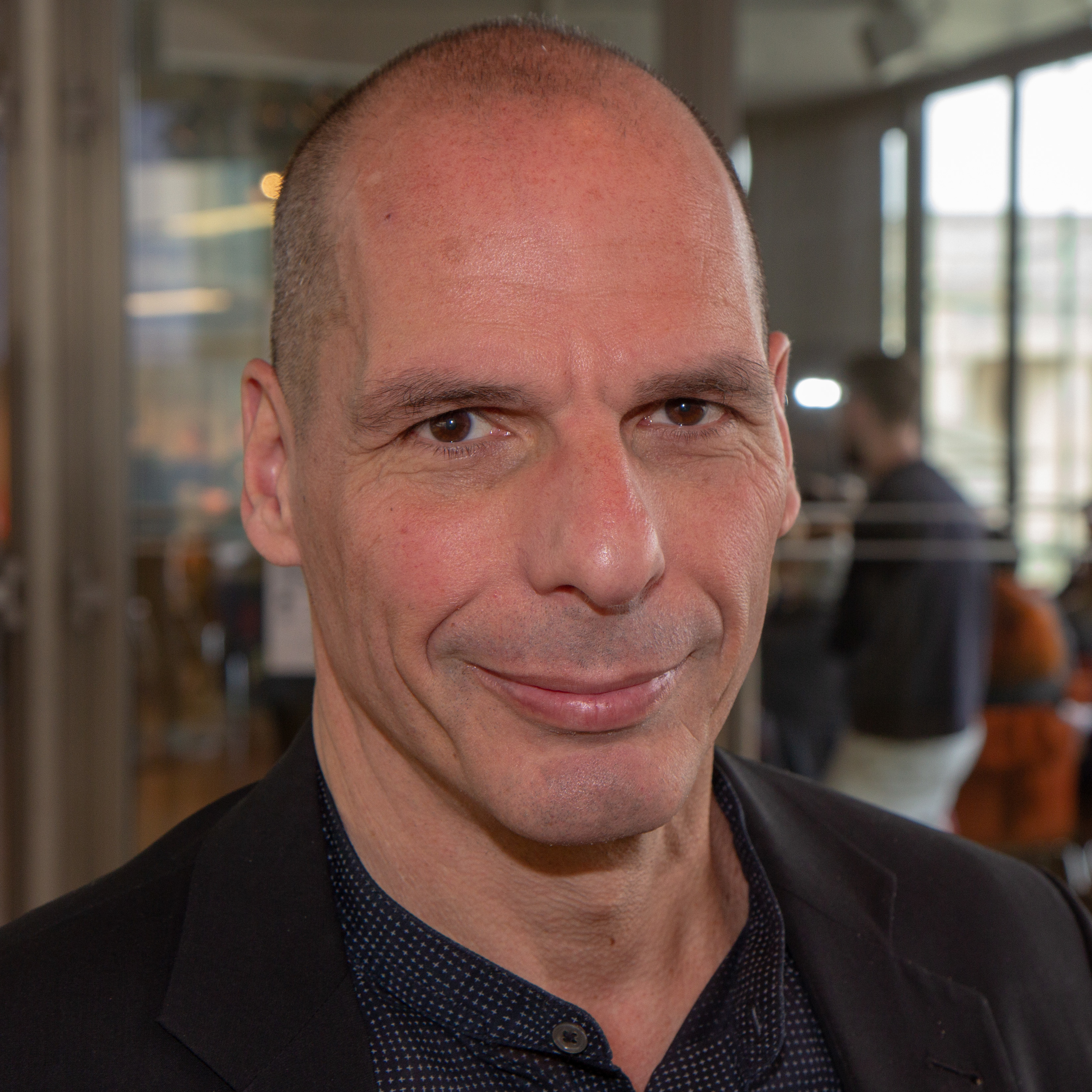
- Varoufakis in 2019

Secretary-General of MeRA25
- Incumbent
- Assumed office 26 March 2018
- Preceded by: Position established

Minister of Finance
- In office 27 January 2015 – 6 July 2015
- Prime Minister: Alexis Tsipras
- Preceded by: Gikas Hardouvelis
- Succeeded by: Euclid Tsakalotos

Member of the Hellenic Parliament
- In office 8 July 2019 – 21 May 2023
- Constituency: Thessaloniki A
- In office 25 January 2015 – 20 September 2015
- Constituency: Athens B

Personal details
- Born: Ioannis Georgiou Varoufakis; 24 March 1961 (age 65) Palaio Faliro, Athens, Kingdom of Greece
- Citizenship: Greece; Australia (since 1991)
- Party: MeRA25 (since 2018)
- Other political affiliations: Syriza (2012–2015)
- Spouse: Danae Stratou
- Children: 1
- Education: University of Essex (BSc, PhD); University of Birmingham (MSc)
- Website: Official website

Academic background
- Influences: Marx; Keynes; Robinson; Kalecki; Papandreou; Galbraith; Mirowski; Sweezy; Leijonhufvud; Wolff

Academic work
- Discipline: Game theory; Political economy; Marxian economics

Ioannis Georgiou "Yanis" Varoufakis (Note: English: /ˈjænɪs ˌværuːˈfækɪs/ YAN-iss VARR-oo-FAK-iss; Greek: Ιωάννης Γεωργίου "Γιάνης" Βαρουφάκης, romanized: Ioánnis Georgíou "Giánis" Varoufákis [ˈʝanis varuˈfacis]) (born 24 March 1961) is a Greek economist, academic, author, and politician. Since 2018, he has served as Secretary-General of Democracy in Europe Movement 2025 (DiEM25), a left-wing European political alliance he co-founded in 2016. Previously, he served as Minister of Finance in the government of Alexis Tsipras in 2015, during the 2009–2018 Greek government-debt crisis, where he became internationally known for opposing EU-imposed austerity measures.

In 2018, Varoufakis founded MeRA25, the Greek wing of DiEM25, and later served in the Hellenic Parliament from 2019 to 2023. He is Professor of Economic Theory at the National and Kapodistrian University of Athens and has held academic positions at institutions including King's College London, University of Cambridge, and the University of Sydney.

Varoufakis is known for his criticism of austerity, neoliberal economics, and the structure of the Eurozone. He is also a co-founder of the Progressive International.

== Early life and education ==
Varoufakis was born in Palaio Faliro on 24 March 1961 to Georgios and Eleni Varoufakis (née Tsaggaraki). His father, Georgios Varoufakis, was an Egyptian Greek from Cairo with family roots in Rethymno. Georgios Varoufakis moved to Greece in 1946 to study chemistry at the University of Athens. During the Greek Civil War, he was persecuted for refusing to sign a declaration denouncing communism and was imprisoned for four years on the island of Makronisos, which served as a political re-education camp. After his release in 1950, Georgios Varoufakis completed his studies in metallurgy and chemical engineering and later worked for Halyvourgiki, eventually becoming chairman of its board in 2003. He remained in the role until the company closed in 2020. Georgios Varoufakis died in September 2021.

Varoufakis's mother, Eleni, also studied chemistry at the University of Athens. Originally from a conservative background, she became politically active after meeting Georgios, who was associated with the United Democratic Left. In the 1970s, she campaigned for women's rights through the Women's Union of Greece, an initiative linked to members of PASOK. By the early 1980s, both parents had embraced socialist politics. Eleni later served for several years as a municipal councillor in Palaio Faliro before her death in 2008. Yanis has a sister, Trisevgeni.

Varoufakis was six years old when the 1967 Greek coup d'état brought the military junta to power. He attended the private Moraitis School, where he adopted the unconventional spelling "Yanis" instead of the standard Greek transliteration "Yannis", reportedly for aesthetic reasons. After a teacher penalized him for the change, he decided to keep the spelling permanently.

In 1978, his parents considered the political climate in Greece too unstable for him to continue his education there, so he moved to the United Kingdom. He enrolled at the University of Essex, initially intending to study physics before turning to economics and later mathematics. During his student years, he became active in left-wing politics, joining organisations such as the Communist Society and the Troops Out Movement, which advocated British withdrawal from Northern Ireland. He also served as secretary of the Black Students Alliance, arguing that “black” should be understood as a political rather than purely ethnic identity.

In 1981, Varoufakis moved to the University of Birmingham, where he completed an MSc in mathematical statistics in 1982. He later returned to the University of Essex to pursue doctoral studies in economics, earning his PhD in 1987 with a dissertation titled On Optimization and Strikes under the supervision of Monojit Chatterji.

== Academic career ==
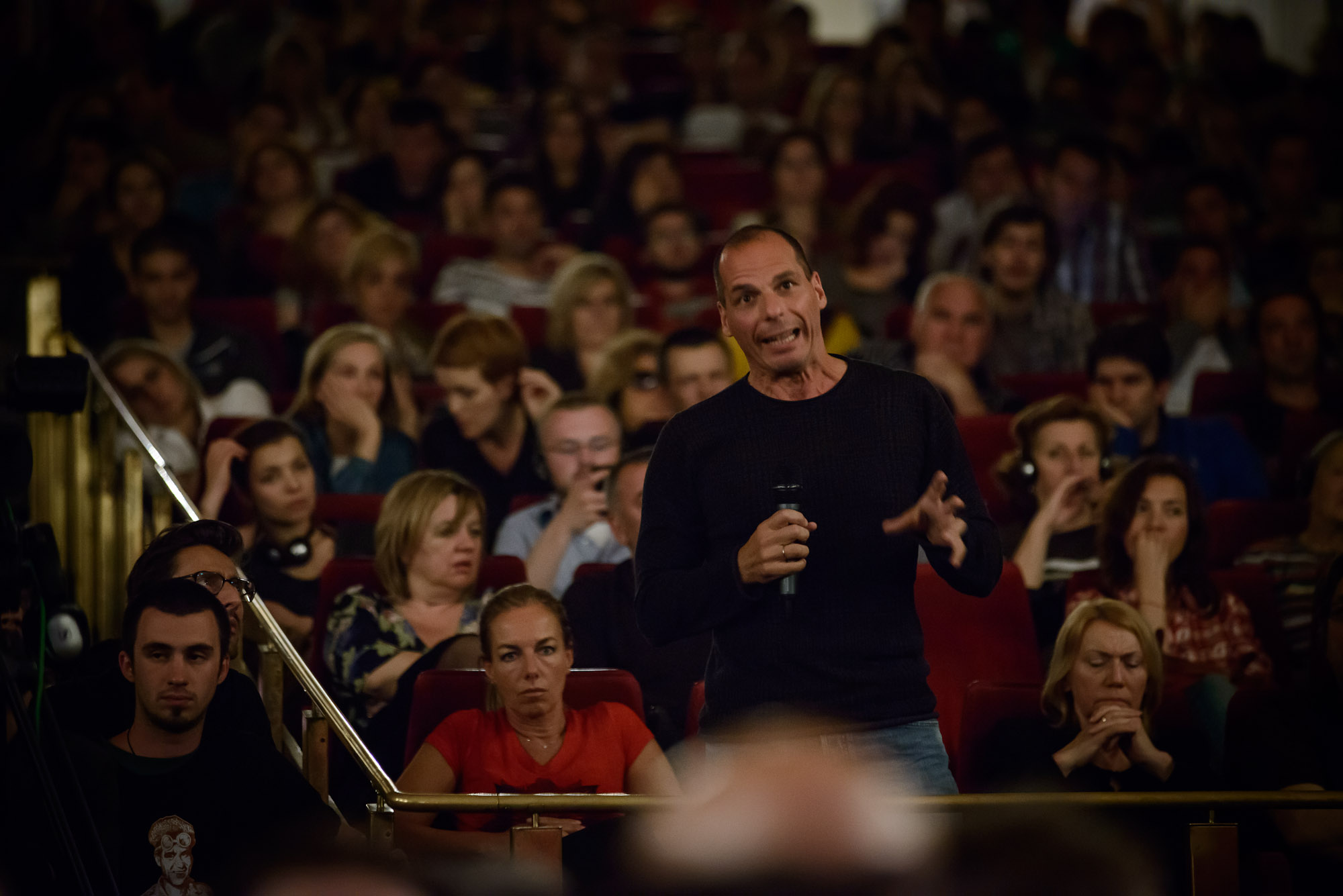
Varoufakis at Subversive Festival 2013 in Zagreb, Croatia

Varoufakis began his academic career teaching economics and econometrics at the University of Essex, the University of East Anglia, and later at the University of Cambridge. To avoid conscription in Greece and due to budget cuts of Margaret Thatcher, he moved to Australia in 1988 and joined the University of Sydney, where he taught as a senior lecturer in economics until 2000. During this period, he also held short appointments at the University of Glasgow and University of Louvain, and became an outspoken critic of the conservative government of John Howard. He obtained Australian citizenship in 1991.

In 2000, Varoufakis returned to Greece and joined the National and Kapodistrian University of Athens as Associate Professor of Economic Theory, becoming a full professor in 2005. He also founded the university's doctoral programme in economics in 2002. Between 2004 and 2006, he served as an economic adviser to George Papandreou, though he later became a sharp critic of Papandreou's government during the Greek debt crisis.

In 2012, Varoufakis joined Valve as economist-in-residence, researching the virtual economy of the gaming platform Steam. He later held visiting academic posts at the University of Texas at Austin and Stockholm University, focusing on economics, game theory, and digital systems.

== Minister of Finance and the Syriza government (January–August 2015) ==
In January 2015, Varoufakis was elected to the Greek parliament as a member of Syriza and was appointed Finance Minister in the government of Alexis Tsipras. His appointment came at the height of the Greek debt crisis, with the new government promising to renegotiate Greece's bailout agreements and reverse harsh austerity measures imposed by international creditors.

Varoufakis led negotiations with the so-called "troika" (the European Central Bank, International Monetary Fund, and European Commission). He argued that previous bailout programs had deepened Greece's economic collapse by combining new loans with severe austerity, without restructuring the country's unsustainable debt. In February 2015, he secured a four-month extension of Greece's loan agreement, though negotiations with European creditors remained tense and ultimately stalled.

Throughout the first half of 2015, relations between Greece and its lenders deteriorated as the government resisted further cuts and demanded debt relief. In June, after creditors presented Greece with a final proposal, Tsipras called a national referendum on whether to accept the terms. Varoufakis campaigned strongly for a "No" vote, arguing that Greece needed a stronger mandate to negotiate a fairer agreement.

On 5 July 2015, more than 61 percent of Greek voters rejected the creditors' proposal. Despite the result, Tsipras soon moved toward accepting a new bailout agreement. Unwilling to support what he considered a surrender to austerity demands, Varoufakis resigned as Finance Minister the following day.

Later in 2015, he voted against the third Greek bailout package in parliament and declined to run again with Syriza. Instead, he announced plans to focus on building a broader European party aimed at democratic and economic reform across the European Union.

=== Commentary on appointment ===
The Adam Smith Institute, a leading free-market think tank in the United Kingdom, "enthusiastically" supported Varoufakis's debt-swap plan and asked the then British Chancellor of the Exchequer George Osborne to support it. Varoufakis had proposed debt swap measures, including bonds pegged to economic growth, which would replace the existing bonds of the European bailout programme.

Bloomberg said that Varoufakis was a "brilliant economist", but he had difficult interactions with other politicians and the media. James K. Galbraith, referring to Varoufakis's expertise in game theory, has said that he knows as much about this subject "as anyone on the planet", and that "[he] will be thinking more than a few steps ahead" in any interactions with the troika. Two weeks later, Varoufakis wrote an op-ed in The New York Times saying that using game theory would be "pure folly" and that he wanted to "shun any temptation to treat this pivotal moment as an experiment in strategizing and, instead, to present honestly the facts concerning Greece's social economy".

== Later political career (2015–present) ==
In September 2015, Varoufakis appeared on the British topical debate show Question Time. He was praised for his performance by Mark Lawson in The Guardian, who wrote: "several of the sentences he spoke in a second language were more impressive than most that his fellow panellists managed in their native tongue." He appeared on the show again in October 2016 and March 2019. He has described himself as a "libertarian Marxist".

Varoufakis attended an event in London hosted by The Guardian on 23 October 2015, where he spoke about the UK's upcoming European Union membership referendum. He said that the UK should remain in the EU, but also campaign to democratise it: "My message is simple yet rich: those of us who disdain the democratic deficit in Brussels, those of us who detest the authoritarianism of a technocracy which is incompetent and contemptuous of democracy, those of us who are most critical of Europe have a moral duty to stay in Europe, fight for it, and democratise it." He would return to the UK, in May 2016, in the final stages of the campaigning to again urge a remain vote. On 9 February 2016, Varoufakis launched the Democracy in Europe Movement 2025 (DiEM25) at the Volksbühne in Berlin.

In March 2016, Varoufakis publicly supported the idea of a basic income. On 2 April 2016, in reaction to tension between German Chancellor Angela Merkel and the IMF, Varoufakis said there was underway "an attrition war between a reasonably numerate villain (the IMF) and a chronic procrastinator (Berlin)" as to Greek debt relief.

In March 2018, Varoufakis announced the launch of his own political party, MeRA25, with a stated aim of freeing Greece from "debt bondage". He stated that he hoped the party would be based on an alliance of "people of the left and liberalism, greens and feminists". The party, whose name stands for "European Realistic Disobedience Front", is affiliated to DiEM25.

On 20 August 2018, in an on-stage book festival interview in Edinburgh, Varoufakis pressed Jeremy Corbyn, head of the British Labour Party, to "be a bit more ambitious" and become involved in the international progressive movement, saying "We need a progressive international". On 13 September, Varoufakis penned an op-ed piece in The Guardian about the need for an international progressive movement, alongside a similar piece by fellow progressive U.S. Senator Bernie Sanders. On 26 October in Rome, Varoufakis announced the Progressive International, which was described as a "common blueprint for an International New Deal, a progressive New Bretton Woods". The organisation was formally founded and launched on 11 May 2020.

On 25 November 2018, Varoufakis was selected to head the list of "Demokratie in Europa" (an initiative of Varoufakis' DiEM25 with the support of the German mini-party Democracy in Motion), for the 2019 European elections but was not elected, as the list failed to elect a single MEP.

On 7 July 2019, his party MeRA25 passed the threshold necessary to enter the Greek parliament and Varoufakis was re-elected an MP.

In November 2019, along with other public figures, Varoufakis signed a letter supporting Labour Party leader Jeremy Corbyn describing Corbyn as "a beacon of hope in the struggle against emergent far-right nationalism, xenophobia and racism in much of the democratic world" and endorsed him in the 2019 UK general election. In December 2019, along with 42 other leading cultural figures, he signed a letter endorsing the Labour Party under Corbyn's leadership in the 2019 general election. The letter stated that "Labour's election manifesto under Jeremy Corbyn's leadership offers a transformative plan that prioritises the needs of people and the planet over private profit and the vested interests of a few."

Varoufakis wrote an article for Project Syndicate in late 2021, commenting on and critiquing Facebook's newly introduced Meta project.

In an October 2022 interview, Varoufakis stated that the U.S. wants to keep the Russo-Ukrainian War going, as it serves American interests. For the war to end, he proposed that the opposing sides should come to an agreement, that will include the withdrawal of the Russian troops to their pre-24 February bases, a commitment from the U.S. that Ukraine will not enter NATO, mutual guarantees of Ukraine's independence and neutrality, a Good Friday-like agreement for the Donbas area, and the issue of Russia's annexation of Crimea to be discussed in the next 50 years, as there is no way that this can be resolved peacefully at this stage. He also said that he supports Ukraine, as he would do for "any nation, any country, any people, that are defending their homes."

On 10 March 2023, Varoufakis was dining with DiEM25 associates in central Athens when a group of individuals entered the restaurant, approached him, and accused him of siding with the troika, selling out on austerity bailouts. When he took the confrontation outside, they beat him violently, in what DiEM25 described as a "brazen fascist attack". At least one person, a teenager, was charged in the attack. After the attack, Varoufakis decided to accept police protection by the Ministry of Citizen Protection.

At both the May and June 2023 Greek elections, his party MeRA25 failed to pass the threshold necessary to enter the Greek parliament and Varoufakis was therefore not re-elected as an MP.

At the 2024 European Parliament election, he was again a candidate in Greece but he was not elected. His movement DiEM25 stood electoral lists in Greece, Germany and Italy but failed to elect any MEP.

=== Gaza war and German entry ban ===
In April 2024, due to the ongoing Gaza war, the party of Yanis Varoufakis co-organised a pro-Palestinian conference that was scheduled to take place in Berlin on 12 April 2024, and last for three days. The conference was interrupted and halted as soon as it began by the Berlin Police, on the orders of Berlin mayor Kai Wegner. The police said they "feared that attendees would make anti-Semitic remarks and glorify violence". The German state issued a Betätigungsverbot (ban on activities) against Yanis Varoufakis, Ghassan Abu-Sitta (who was arrested upon entering Germany), and Salman Abu Sitta. Germany also banned Varoufakis for four days from entering Germany and from engaging in any political activities in the country or from participating in similar exchanges on online platforms. Varoufakis responded to what he described as a road "towards totalitarianism" by suing the German state.

== Works ==
Varoufakis is the author of several books on the European debt crisis, the financial imbalance in the world and game theory.

=== A Modest Proposal ===
In November 2010, he and Stuart Holland, a former British Labour Party MP and economics professor at the University of Coimbra (Portugal), published A Modest Proposal, a set of economic policies aimed at overcoming the euro crisis.

In 2013, Version 4.0 of A Modest Proposal appeared with the American economist James K. Galbraith as a third co-author. This version was published in late 2013 in French with a supporting foreword by Michel Rocard, former Prime Minister of France. Since September 2011, Truman Factor features select articles by Varoufakis in English and in Spanish.

=== Books in English ===
- (ed.) Conflict in Economics. Hemel Hempstead: Harvester Wheatsheaf and New York: St Martin's Press, 1990 (with David P. T. Young)
- Rational Conflict. Oxford: Blackwell, 1991
- Game Theory: A Critical Introduction. London and New York: Routledge, 1995 (with Shaun Hargreaves-Heap), ISBN 978-0-415-09402-3. 2nd rev ed, 2004 (Game Theory: A critical text), ISBN 978-0-415-25095-5 (translated also in Japanese)
- Foundations of Economics: A beginner's companion. London and New York: Routledge, 1998 (translation in Mandarin)
- (ed.) Game Theory: Critical Perspectives. Volumes 1–5, London and New York: Routledge, 2001
- Modern Political Economics: Making sense of the post-2008 world. London and New York: Routledge, 2011 (with Joseph Halevi and Nicholas Theocarakis)
- Economic Indeterminacy: A personal encounter with the economists' most peculiar nemesis. London and New York: Routledge, 2013 (ISBN 0-415-66849-2)
- The Global Minotaur: America, the True Origins of the Financial Crisis and the Future of the World Economy. London and New York: Zed Books, 2011 (ISBN 978-1-78360-610-8). Translations in German, Greek, Italian, Spanish, Czech, Finnish, French, Norwegian, and Polish; 2nd ed, 2013; 3rd ed, 2015
- Europe after the Minotaur: Greece and the Future of the Global Economy. London and New York: Zed Books, 2015 (ISBN 978-1-78360-608-5)
- And the Weak Suffer What They Must? Europe's crisis, America's economic future. New York: Nation Books, 2016 (U.S. edition, ISBN 978-1-56858-504-8); And The Weak Suffer What They Must?: Europe, Austerity and the Threat to Global Stability. London: The Bodley Head, 2016 (UK edition, ISBN 978-1-84792-403-2)
- Adults in the Room: My Battle With Europe's Deep Establishment. London and New York: Random House, 2017 (ISBN 978-1-4735-4782-7) The Guardian ranked Adults in the Room #86 in its list of 100 Best Books of the 21st Century.
- Talking to My Daughter About the Economy. The Bodley Head Ltd, 2017 (ISBN 978-1-84792-444-5)
- Another Now: Dispatches from an Alternative Present, Bodley Head, 2020 (ISBN 978-1-84792-564-0); Melville House US, 2021 (ISBN 978-1-61219-956-6)
- Technofeudalism: What Killed Capitalism, Bodley Head UK, 2023 (ISBN 978-1-84792-727-9); Melville House US, 2024 (ISBN 978-1-68589-124-4)
- Raise Your Soul: A Personal History of Resistance, Vintage Publishing, 2025 (ISBN 978-1-84792-906-8)

=== Films ===
A film based on his book Adults in the Room, was directed by Costa-Gavras and released in 2019. Varoufakis himself is portrayed by actor Christos Loulis.

Varoufakis was the subject of a 2024 six-part documentary series by director Raoul Martinez, titled In the Eye of the Storm: The Political Odyssey of Yanis Varoufakis.

== Personal life ==
Varoufakis is married to installation artist Danae Stratou. He has one daughter, Xenia, from a previous marriage. In addition to being an internationalist and pro-Europeanist, Varoufakis is also an Anglophile.

== Notes ==
Political offices
Preceded by Gikas Hardouvelis	Minister of Finance; 2015	Succeeded by Euclid Tsakalotos
Party political offices
New political party	Secretary-General of MeRA25; 2018–present	Incumbent
