= James Dolena =

Russian-born American architect

- Born: May 17, 1888; Russian Empire
- Died: June 12, 1978 (aged 90); Los Angeles County, California
- Occupation: Architect

James Dolena (1888–1978) was a Russian-born American architect who designed many houses in Los Angeles, California.

== Early life ==
James Dolena was born in Russia on May 17, 1888. He emigrated to the United States in 1905. He was trained as an architect and a painter.

== Career ==
Dolena first moved to Los Angeles to install a mural with Hubert Valentine Fanshaw, and spent the rest of his life there.

In 1926, Dolena designed a house for the silent actor Hobart Bosworth, a 3.2-acre mansion located at 809 North Hillcrest Road in Beverly Hills, California. The interiors were designed by William Haines and the gardens by Benjamin Martin Purdy. In 1933, William Powell and Carole Lombard purchased the house, and the following year, Dolena redesigned it. In 1969, the producer Albert R. Broccoli bought it, and in 2005, the interior designer Kelly Wearstler bought it.

In 1931, Dolena designed the Garden Apartment and Retail Shop, an apartment house in Westwood, Los Angeles. The following year, in 1932, he designed the private residence of film director Richard Wallace in Bel Air, Los Angeles. Later in 1932, he designed the private residence of actress Constance Bennett in Holmby Hills, Los Angeles. In 1936, he designed the home of Ingle Barr, a renowned book collector, in Beverly Hills, California. From 1934 to 1937, he designed the Farmers Market in the Fairfax District, Los Angeles.

From 1937 to 1939, Dolena designed Casa Encantada located at 10644 Bellagio Road in Bel Air, Los Angeles for Hilda Boldt Weber, heiress to the Charles Boldt Glass Co. The interiors and furniture were designed by T. H. Robsjohn-Gibbings. It spans 8.4 acres (3.4 ha) and has sixty-four rooms. In 1950, hotelier Conrad Hilton purchased it for $225,000. He sold it to David H. Murdock for $12.4 million in 1979. Gary Winnick purchased it for $94 million in 2000.

From 1937 to 1940, Dolena designed the Boddy House for Manchester Boddy on the grounds of Descanso Gardens in La Cañada Flintridge, California. In 1939, he designed the private residence of George Cukor. William Haines was the interior designer. The same year, he designed the house of Col. David L. Reeves in Santa Barbara, California. In 1940, he designed the B.T. Gate House in Brentwood, Los Angeles.

In 1949, Dolena designed the Walt Disney Estate, a 5,669-square-foot, seventeen-room mansion, for Walt Disney and his wife Lillian Disney in Holmby Hills, Los Angeles.

== Personal life ==
Dolena lived in Brentwood, Los Angeles, in a house he designed in 1935.

Dolena died on June 12, 1978, in Los Angeles County, California.
