= Economic policies of Andreas Papandreou =

The economic policies of Andreas Papandreou during his terms as Prime Minister of Greece (1981–1989 and 1993–1996) represented a significant restructuring of the economy of Greece, which was under pressure from the 1970s oil crisis and the increased competition from its entry into the European Economic Community (EEC) in 1981.

Papandreou's government pursued expansionary, populist, and redistributive measures designed to promote social justice and strengthen state-led development. However, these policies also created substantial macroeconomic imbalances, particularly in public debt, unemployment, and inflation. Moreover, his populism, under the guise of inclusionist social policies, became part of his political party's (PASOK) patronage, according to some of his critics, and greatly expanded through the misuse of EEC funds and an unprecedented rate of foreign borrowing, which brought the Greek economy to the verge of bankruptcy levels.

At the start of his second term (1985–1989), Papandreou introduced a set of austerity measures tied to an EEC loan intended to prevent Greece from bankruptcy and help align its economy with other European countries. Although Finance Minister Costas Simitis successfully carried out these measures, public backlash unsettled Papandreou ahead of the 1989 elections, prompting him to abandon the reforms at the end of 1987 and return to populist policies, thereby undoing two years of economic progress. Papandreou's reliance on foreign loans significantly increased national debt, which became a significant burden for future governments.

Papandreou changed course in his third term (1993–1996), adopting the austerity policies initiated by his predecessor, Konstantinos Mitsotakis (1990–1993), as Greece had limited time to meet the Euro convergence criteria.

== First administration (1981–1985) ==
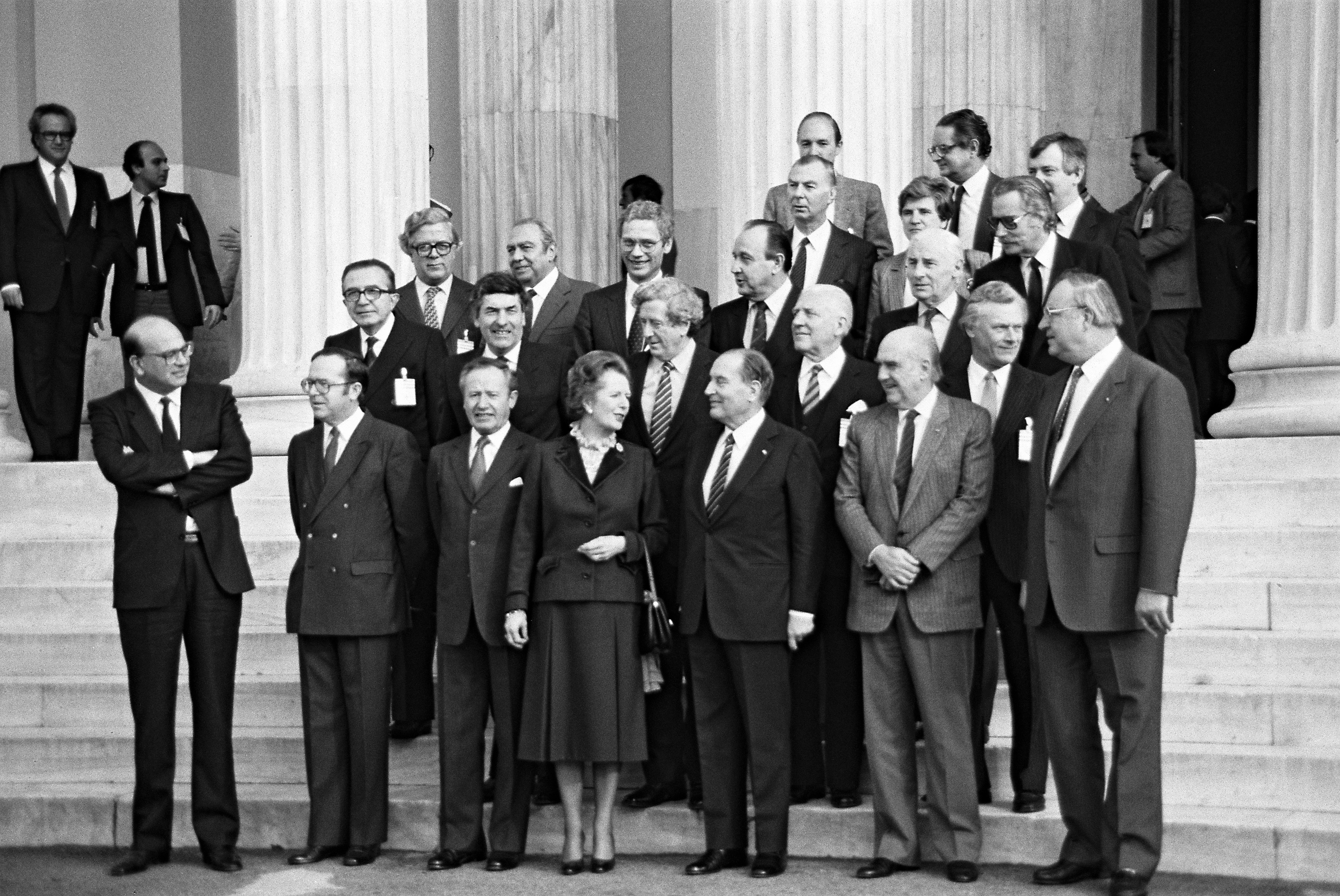
Andreas Papandreou in Athens European Council – 1983. (1st row L-R) Bettino Craxi, Wilfried Martens, Gaston Thorn, Margaret Thatcher, François Mitterrand, Andreas Papandreou, and Helmut Kohl.

=== European Economic Community ===
Papandreou abandoned his campaign promise to put Greece's entry into the EEC to a referendum and instead submitted a memorandum to the EEC with a list of demands in March 1982. The memorandum effectively pleaded for special treatment and financial support based on Greece's "peculiarities". The EEC delayed its response until after the date at which Greece could opt out of its entry into the EEC and then rejected the Greek memorandum in March 1983. However, the EEC promised support via the newly created "Integrated Mediterranean Programs", and Papandreou declared victory. Greece started to become more dependent on EEC funding, and by 1989, EEC support had reached 4.5% of Greece's GDP. In March 1985, Papandreou stated that Greece would remain in the EEC for the foreseeable future because "the cost of leaving would be much higher than the cost of staying"; there was little reaction from PASOK members.

=== Pro-worker policies ===
In domestic affairs, Papandreou's government carried out a series of wealth redistribution policies upon coming into office that immediately increased the availability of entitlement aid to the unemployed and lower wage earners. Public spending on pensions nearly doubled from 5.8% in 1980 to 10.7% in 1985, manufacturing workers acquired a salary increase of 10%, and the minimum wage increased by 32% overnight in 1982. The share of gross national product devoted to social welfare, social insurance, and health was significantly increased. The government made credit more accessible, provided a variety of handouts to various groups, and introduced a wage indexation system protecting (particularly low) wage earners' salaries from the erosion of high inflation, which was around 20% in the early 80s. Changes were made to labor laws, which, until 1984, made it difficult for employers to make workers redundant. A number of other reforms were carried out in areas such as the protection of union and protest rights. A national system against unemployment was set up that granted benefits to young people and elderly unemployed persons. In addition, Law 1545/85 extended unemployment benefit duration for certain groups of people while relaxing entitlement to unemployment benefit. From 1982 to 1985, public consumption and public investment grew on average by 7% and 10%, respectively.

=== Nationalization and patronage ===
The pro-worker policies and Papandreou's failure to address the rising structural issues (limited growth and high inflation) in the Greek economy at a time when the capital was moving out of Europe in the early 80s placed additional pressure on the companies in Greece; Papandreou's anti-capital rhetoric was not helping to secure foreign investments. Companies in Greece already had competitiveness issues and diminished profits due to the oil crisis in the 70s, and they were now exposed to European competition. Several multi-national companies left Greece, such as Esso, Ethyl, Pirelli, and Goodyear. Shipyards and associated industries employing thousands of workers shuttered. Companies not already bankrupted encouraged early retirement, further burdening the Greek state, which had to assist the insurance funds.

In 1983, PASOK nationalized companies over a wide range of industries ranging from textiles, consumer goods, metallurgy, and mining by establishing a restructuring business agency, "Industrial Reconstruction Organisation". The companies under this organization continued to operate at a loss without increasing productivity, effectively turning nationalization of the economy into patronage. The undersecretary for industry, Vasso Papandreou (no relation), commented on the inability of the government to improve the nationalized non-competitive industries (problematics), "it would be more cost-effective to shut the problematics and simply keep on paying workers their wages." Among these companies were the munitions company Pyrkal, Heracles General Cement company, and the textile corporation Peiraiki-Patraiki.

Greek agriculture also encountered considerable obstacles in the EEC market. As a result, the former trade surplus in agricultural products turned into a deficit from 1986 onward. Part of the problem was that Papandreou artificially increased the salaries, resulting in farmers importing agricultural products while theirs remained in fields uncollected due to the absence of cheap labor; this issue was partially resolved with cheap labor from the Balkans after the dissolution of Soviet Union in 1989. By the end of his first term, Papandreou recognized the lack of productivity and increased trade deficits, admitting that "we consume more than we produce."

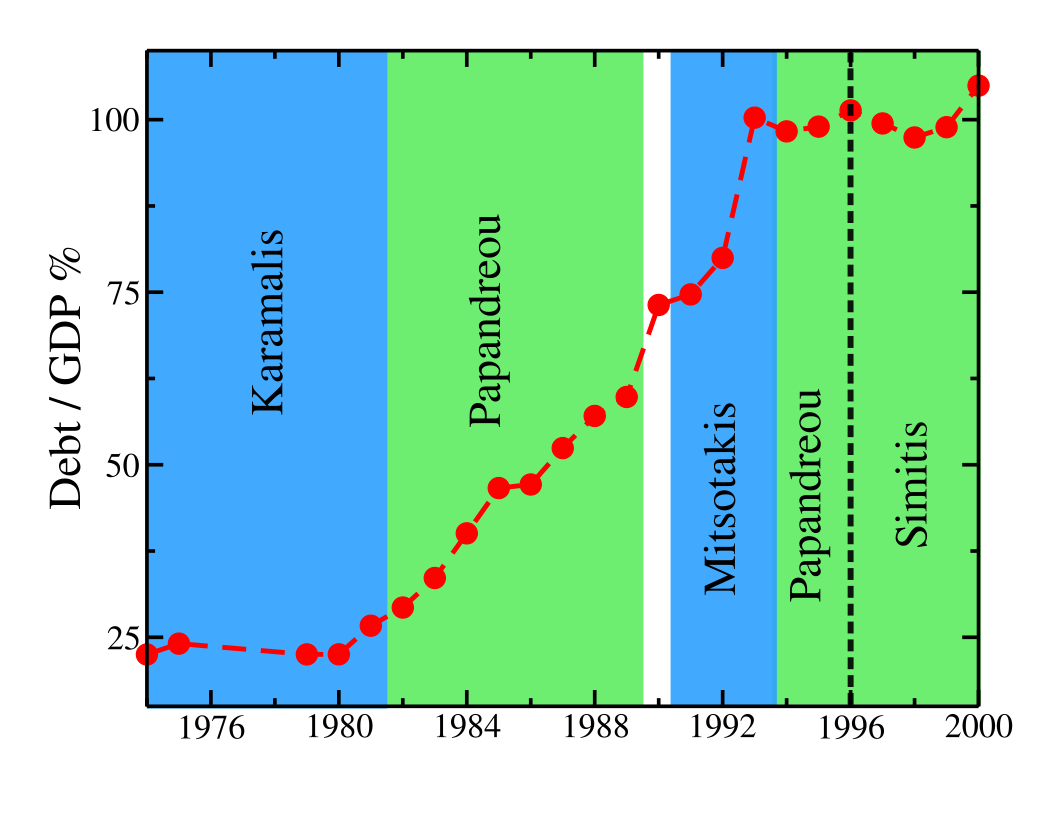
Greek debt over GDP (%) in 1974–2000 period. The colored regions approximately highlight the prime ministers' reigns; for 1989–1990, there was no stable government due to Papandreou's change in electoral law. In 1981, Papandreou altered the course of the economy by increasing its dependence on foreign borrowing. The dataset is from the International Monetary Fund website .

=== Staflation and near bankruptcy ===
The size of this nationalization endeavor brought the Bank of Greece, which effectively converted the private debt of these companies into public debt and effectively burdened the average taxpayer, to the brink of collapse. Moreover, it increased public spending substantially during Papandreou's first term in office, from 40.6% in 1980 to 55.5% in 1985. The deindustrialization and the global recession led to the Greek economy shrinking by −1.55% in 1981, −1.13% in 1982, and −1.08% in 1983. Recovery started once EEC support arrived in Greece. Still, growth was anemic due to his government's inability to effectively utilize this financial support to improve the economy, mainly due to corruption and clientelism. The lack of economic growth and investments, as well as high inflation, increased unemployment from 2.8% in 1980 to approximately 8% by the end of Papandreou's first administration; an economic condition known as stagflation. Papandreou did not introduce progressive tax reform to increase the state's revenues to address the increasing budget deficits due to his policies, and instead, he used foreign loans. As the foreign debt increased, so did the external debt interest payments from 2.5% of GDP in 1980 to 5.4% of GDP in 1986, more than defense and education combined in his second administration. It was viewed that Greece was at near-bankruptcy levels.

== Second administration (1985–1989) ==
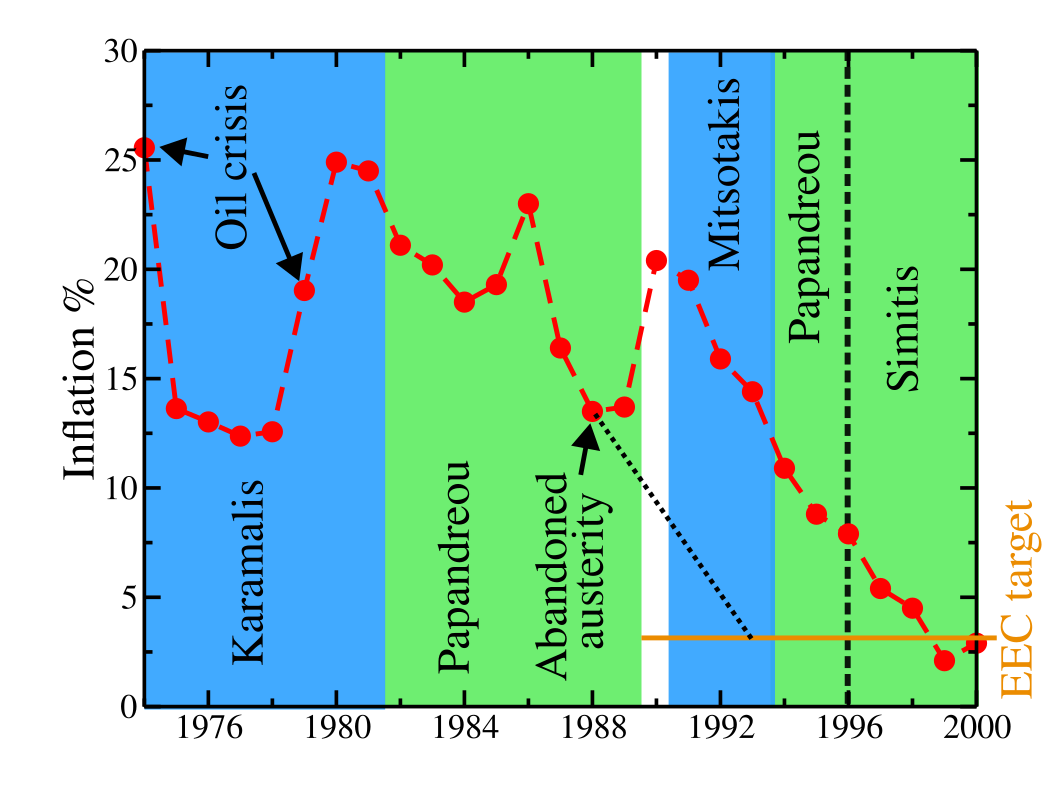
Greek inflation (%) in 1974–2000 period. The colored regions approximately highlight the prime minister's reigns; for 1989–1990, there was no stable government due to Papandreou's change in electoral law. In 1987, Papandreou abandoned the austerity measures (the dotted line estimates inflation if he had not) and delayed the convergence of the Greek economy with EEC criteria by more than four years. The 1980–2000 dataset is from the International Monetary Fund website , the 1974–1979 dataset is from the AMECO Database .

In 1985, Papandreou began his second administration with a comfortable majority in parliament and increased constitutional powers due to the favorable outcome of the constitutional crisis.

In 1985, Papandreou's government applied to the EEC for a $1.75 billion loan to deal with the widening foreign trade deficit (8.7% of GDP). However, the EEC imposed the implementation of a package of economic stabilization measures as a precondition for the loan. The stabilization package, implemented by Simitis as minister of Finance, included a 15% devaluation of the Greek currency (drachma), posed limits on government borrowing, and monetary policy became stricter, wages ceased to follow inflation, some tax exemptions were eliminated, and, effectively, incomes dropped to pre-1980 levels. As a result of the stabilization program introduced in 1985, public consumption fell by an average of 2.2% and public investment decreased by 18.2% on average in 1986 and 1987.

Papandreou touted the loan as a life-saver for Greece's economy because, without it, the International Monetary Fund (IMF) would have imposed much stricter austerity measures. Moreover, Greece signed the Single European Act in February 1986, which required the member states to deregulate and reduce state intervention in economic life for the formation of a single EEC market by 1992. Simitis' policies had the intended outcome, with inflation reduced from 23% in 1986 to 13.5% in 1988, and the Public Sector Borrowing Requirement fell from approximately 18% of GDP in 1985 to 13% of GDP in 1987. However, Papandreou was shaken by a widespread backlash, with long-running strikes and demonstrations by farmers and major unions in early 1987. With the elections approaching, Papandreou forced Simitis to resign from his ministerial position in November 1987, and the reforms were abandoned in favor of a relaxation of monetary and fiscal policies, effectively violating the loan agreement. The lifting of the austerity measures by 1988 led to a relaxation of income policy. Overall, Greece started to fall last in terms of convergence with EEC goals, economic competitiveness, dependence on EEC and state subsidies, investment, inflation, and growth. The Greek economy was again on the verge of bankruptcy, this time with a warning of expulsion from the president of the European Commission, Jacques Delors, unless a correction course was implemented, while the European press at the time described Greece as a "black sheep".

== Third administration (1993–1996) ==
Like Mitsotakis, Papandreou had to bring the Greek economy to converge with the Euro convergence criteria, but little time remained to achieve them. He abandoned his campaign promises and continued the austerity policies of Mitsotakis with minor alterations, expanding the deregulation and liberalization of the economy. There was less public reaction to these policies because Papandreou found a compromising position between capital and unions, and the pace of deregulation was slower than his predecessor.

== Summary ==
Once in power after the elections of October 1981, Papandreou did not oppose the integration of Greece into the European Union despite his fierce rhetoric against it in the 1970s. Papandreou began to implement a political agenda to restructure the Greek economy and improve living standards by increasing access for lower-income and rural populations to state services such as education and healthcare. Many infrastructure projects were completed in rural areas at the expense of large urban centers. He pursued expansionary fiscal policies, characterized by increases in public spending, and total public expenditure rose from 44.2% to 51.3% of GDP between 1984 and 1988. These increases were carried out to boost social welfare, healthcare, education, and pensions. Workers' rights were reinforced. Women with new rights and protections were integrated into the economy, particularly in the emerging tourism industry. At the same time, he started to nationalize a wide range of companies in key sectors such as banking, industry, and transport, believing this would stabilize the economy and protect national interests.

Papandreou pursued a mix of protectionist policies and state-backed lending, but many of his measures worsened Greece's existing structural economic problems—stemming from the 1970s oil crisis, rising European competition, and the global recession of the early 1980s. His approach reduced business competitiveness, leaving many companies to either leave or minimize investments to survive. Meanwhile, nationalizations, widespread clientelism, corruption, and expansive social spending rapidly expanded the public sector and created large fiscal deficits. Papandreou did not implement progressive taxation and kept military spending high (over 5.5% of GDP), relying instead on foreign loans that significantly increased national debt and became a burden for future governments. By the end of his first term, the trade deficit widened as European imports grew to a point that Greece was nearing bankruptcy, as foreign exchange reserves were at a historic low. In 1985, to avoid economic collapse, Papandreou accepted an EEC loan and imposed austerity. Though the economy began to recover after two years, he abandoned the reforms once PASOK's popularity declined, wasting any progress toward meeting the Euro convergence criteria.

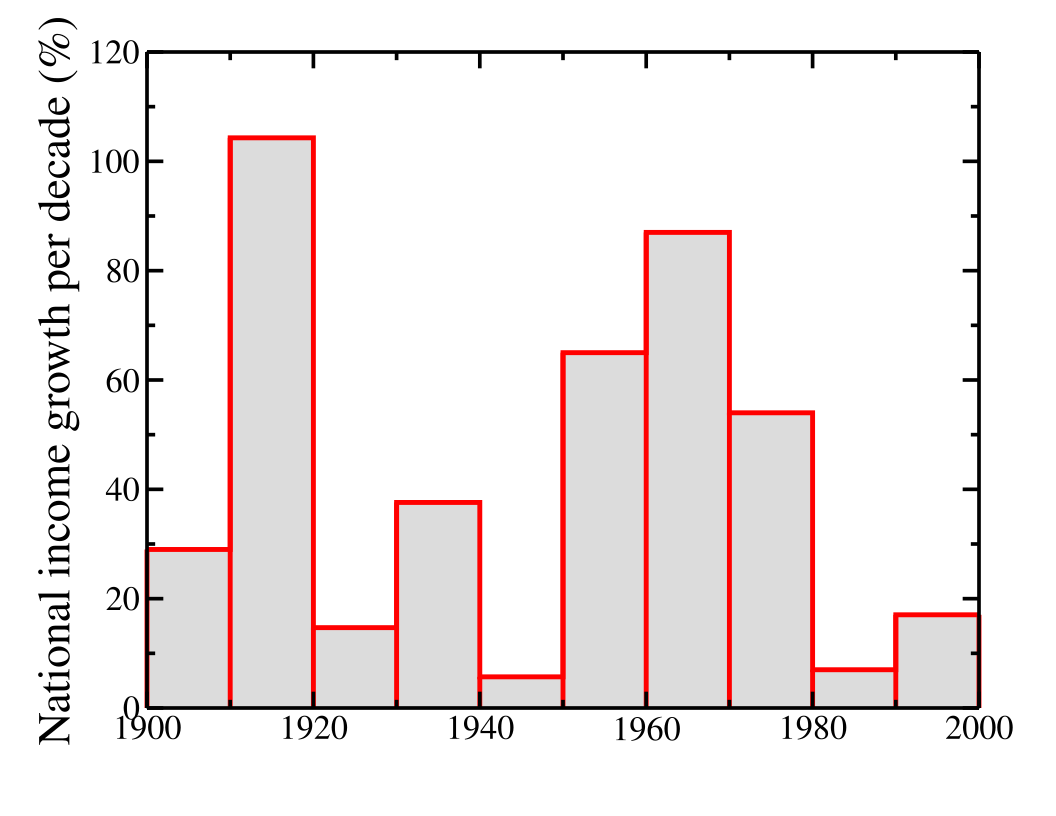
Greek National Income per decade for 1900–2000. During Papandreou's tenure from 1981 to 1989, the national income increased at approximately the same rate as it did during the turbulent decade of 1941–1950. Source: The Bank of Greece and National Statistical Service, various open-source bulletins and reports.

The austerity measures needed in the Greek economy were implemented in the early 1990s by Mitsotakis, which Papandreou continued with minor variations after his return in 1993. After Papandreou's resignation in 1996, Simitis was elected leader of PASOK. He abandoned Papandreou's populist policies and successfully met the economic criteria (Note: While Greece followed the pattern of European countries to converge economic criteria, the political opposition in Greece revised the statistics for political gains.) that enabled Greece to join the Eurozone in 2001.

After eight years of Papandreou's rule, the Greek economy was in dire condition, with a reputation nationally and in European circles as that of a 'black sheep.' Specifically, the economy was burdened by debt that had nearly tripled in size (from 26.7% of GDP in 1981 to 73.3% of GDP in 1990), high inflation rates (ranging between 13% and 23% from 1981 to 1989), rising unemployment (2.7% in 1980 and reached 8% in 1988), chronic primary budget deficits, and large government expenditures some intended to keep failed companies afloat. The gross national income increased in the decade 1981–1990 at about the same rate as in 1941–1950, when foreign occupation and civil war took place. The poor economic performance of Greece and the misuse of EEC funds were the subject of a report produced by the EEC Monetary Committee in March 1992. While political opponents criticized Papandreou's economic policies early on, his allies later criticized them as well. Theodore Stathis, who worked as a minister in the governments of Andreas Papandreou and his father, commented on Papandreou's economic policy outcome,

He [Andreas Papandreou] wanted to build a state with better salaries and services. But in the end, the money just went into the bureaucracy and not to the people. In fact, we built up such a large state that we had to keep borrowing just to pay its expenses. This was a terrible mistake.
