= Stratou =

Stratou is a Greek surname. Notable people with the surname include:

- Danae Stratou (born 1964), Greek artist
- Dora Stratou (1903–1988), Greek actress and dancer
