= Widdicomb Furniture Company =

Defunct furniture company in Michigan, United States

- Industry: Furniture
- Founded: Grand Rapids, Michigan 1858
- Founder: George Widdicomb
- Fate: Went out of business when all four sons served during the Civil War
- Successor: Widdicomb Bros. & Richards
- Headquarters: Grand Rapids, Michigan, USA
- Area served: Throughout the USA
- Key people: T.H. Robsjohn-Gibbing, George Nakashima
- Products: Furniture

Widdicomb Furniture Company was an American furniture company.

== History ==
The company was founded in 1858 when George Widdicomb started a cabinet shop in Grand Rapids, Michigan. The company grew and, with twelve employees, moved to a new, larger location. His four sons went into business with him and the company was named George Widdicomb & Sons. All four sons would serve in the American Civil War. The company dissolved in 1863, while all four sons were enlisted.

The oldest sons opened a small furniture shop in 1864, with the other two brothers joining them around when the war ended. Brother George Widdicomb died in March 1866. In 1868 the store had grown considerably and was moved to a new location in Grand Rapids. They had 25 employees. T.F. Richards came into business with the sons on January 1, 1869. They renamed the business Widdicomb Bros. & Richards. They built a larger building and had a capital of $12,000. They formed the Widdicomb Furniture Company on December 1, 1873. Eventually capital would reach $380,000. They had a new building and approximately 150 employees in 1871. At that time, Widdicomb Furniture Company as known for their spindle bed frames. William Widdicomb, who served as President, retired from the company in 1883.

In 1915, it was sold to Joseph Griswold Sr. and Godfrey von Platen. The company would merge with Mueller Furniture Corporation, becoming Widdicomb-Mueller Corporation, in 1950. Ten years later Mueller would split from Widdicomb. In 1970, the company name is acquired by John Widdicomb Company. From 1943 until 1956, T.H. Robsjohn-Gibbings served as designer for the company, designing Modern furniture. George Nakashima also worked for Widdicomb, from the 1950s to early 1960s. He created the "Origin Group" of pieces.

In 2002, Widdicomb went out of business; design and manufacturing rights for John Widdicomb Company were acquired by Gustav Stickley in August 2002. Stickley continues to offer pieces under the John Widdicomb Collection.

== Products ==
As of 1891, Widdicomb Furniture Company shipped products throughout the United States. Their focus products included bed frames, chiffoniers, and bedroom furniture of various kinds made of oak, ash, birch and maple. They also manufactured mirrors, nightstands, wardrobes, and other bedroom furniture. In 1906, pieces were designed in the styles of American Empire style, French design, and the Colonial Revival Movement. They created photograph cabinets between 1918 and 1920. During the first two decades of the 20th century, bedroom sets were inspired by the Italian Renaissance, Georgian Revival, among others. Traditional pieces like these were no longer made as of 1938, to make way for modern designs.

Modern styles, designed by T. H. Robsjohn-Gibbing in the 1940s and 50s, were inspired by Scandinavian design. George Nakashima's "Origin Collection," was inspired by Japanese and Shaker furniture. The collection consisted of bedroom and dining room pieces.

== Legacy ==
Works by the Widdicomb Furniture Company are found in the collection of the Cooper-Hewitt, National Design Museum. The company's archive is held in the collection of the Grand Rapids Public Library.

== See also ==
- Springfield Furniture Company
- White Furniture Company
