= Danae Stratou =

Greek sculptor (born 1964)

- Δανάη Στράτου
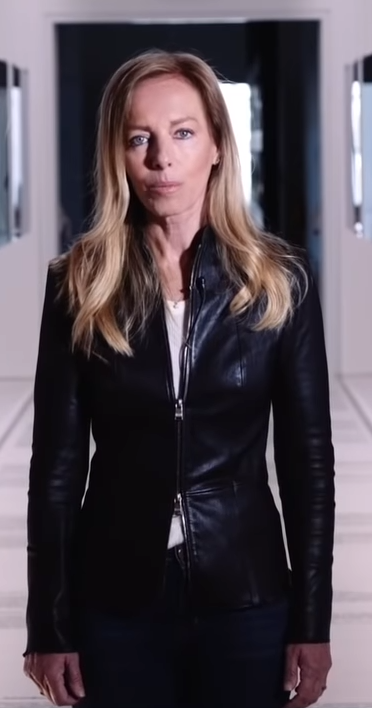
- Born: 1964 (age 61–62); Athens, Greece
- Education: Central School of Art and Design
- Website: www.danaestratou.com

Danae Stratou (Greek: Δανάη Στράτου) is a Greek visual and installation artist and former adjunct professor of fine art. She is the co-founder of the non-profit organisation Vital Space.

== Early life and education ==
Between 1983 and 1988, Stratou took at B.A. in Fine Art (Sculpture) at Central St Martin’s College of Art and Design in London.

Stratou represented Greece at the 48th Venice Biennale in 1999, the first woman in 30 years to do so, and the 2012 Adelaide Festival.

== Notable works ==
Her work has been exhibited at the National Museum of Contemporary Art, Athens and is also on display in museums and private collections in Israel, France, the United States and Egypt.

In 1995 she collaborated with industrial designer Alexandra Stratou and architect Stella Constantinides (together known as D.A.ST. Arteam), and in 1997 they created Desert Breath, a 100,000 square metre spiral-shaped sand sculpture in the Eastern Egyptian Sahara desert near El Gouna by the Red Sea.

For the 2004 Olympics in Athens, her piece The River of Life at the National Museum of Contemporary Art was a part of the Transcultures project. It showed seven videos on seven large screens in a circular room; the films were shot over ten months of seven major rivers from sunrise to sunset with the camera fixed in the same position to capture the uninterrupted flow and shared rhythm.

In her 2007 project Cut – 7 dividing lines she covered 60,000 kilometres with her then partner (now husband) Yanis Varoufakis to photograph seven security walls that divide populations. The works were shown at her gallery Zoumboulakis in Athens.

== Personal life ==
She is married to Yanis Varoufakis, former Greek finance minister and economist. Her mother is Eleni Potaga-Stratou, a Greek modern artist, and her father is Phaidron Stratos from the Stratos family, who founded the Peiraiki-Patraiki textile industry in Patras, Peloponnese, at one time Greece’s largest textile industry.

It has been speculated that she was the subject of English rock band Pulp's 1995 hit "Common People".
