= Klismos =

Style of ancient Greek chair

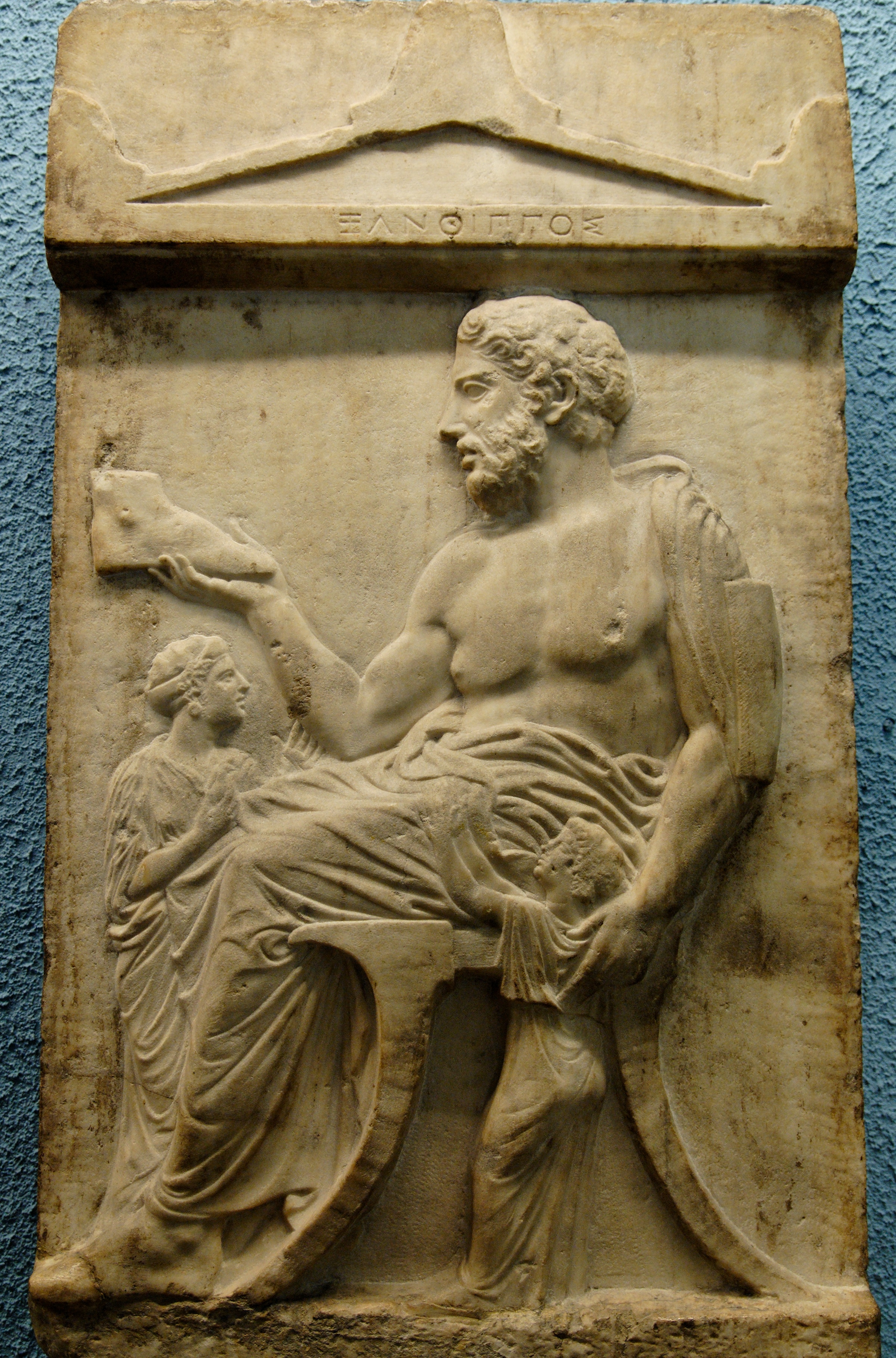
Klismos chair, on the stele of Xanthippos, Athens, ca. 430–20 BCE

A klismos (Greek: κλισμός) or klismos chair is a type of ancient Greek chair, with curved backrest and tapering, outcurved legs.

== Ancient Greece ==
Klismoi are familiar from depictions of ancient furniture on painted pottery and in bas-reliefs from the mid-fifth century BCE onwards. In epic, klismos signifies an armchair, but no specific description is given of its form; in Iliad xxiv, after Priam's appeal, Achilles rises from his thronos, raises the elder man to his feet, goes out to prepare Hector's body for decent funeral and returns, to take his place on his klismos.

A vase-painting of a satyr carrying a klismos chair on his shoulder shows how light such chairs were. The curved, tapered legs of the klismos chair sweep forward and rearward, offering stability. The rear legs sweep continuously upward to support a wide concave backrest like a curved tablet, which supports the sitter's shoulders, or which may be low enough to lean an elbow on. The long and elegant curve was quite difficult to create and may have been carved from a single piece of wood, or by using mortise and tenon joints, or by bending by steam, or by training the wood. The seat was built of four wooden turned staves morticed into the legs; a web of cording or leather strips supported a cushion or a pelt. The klismos was a specifically Greek invention, without detectable earlier inspiration.

The klismos fell from general favour during the Hellenistic period; nevertheless, the theatre of Dionysus at the foot of the Acropolis, Athens, of the first century CE, has carved representations of klismoi. Where a klismos is represented in Roman portraits of seated individuals, the sculptures are copies of Greek works.

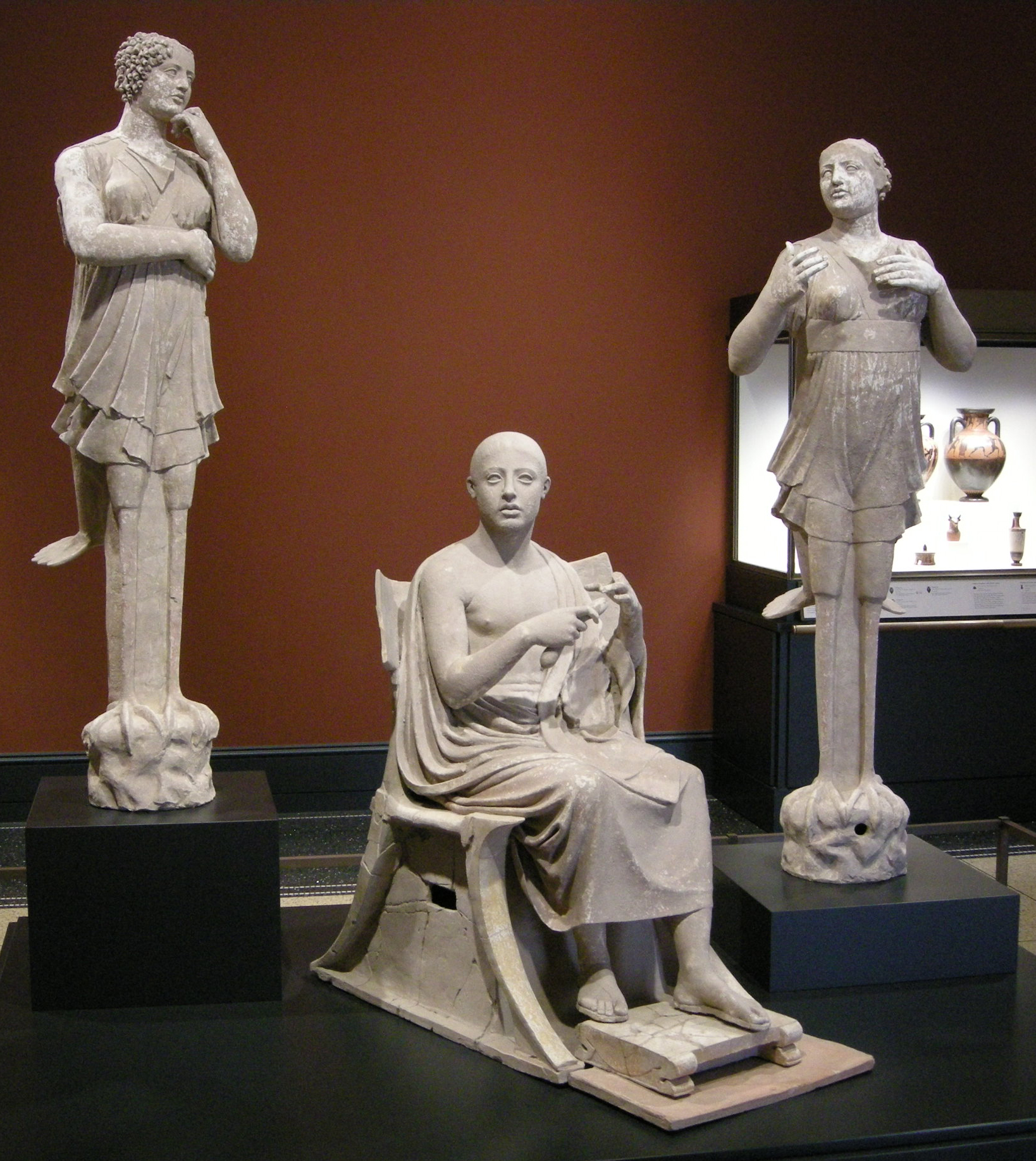
Sculpture group with a man seated in a klismos at the Getty Museum

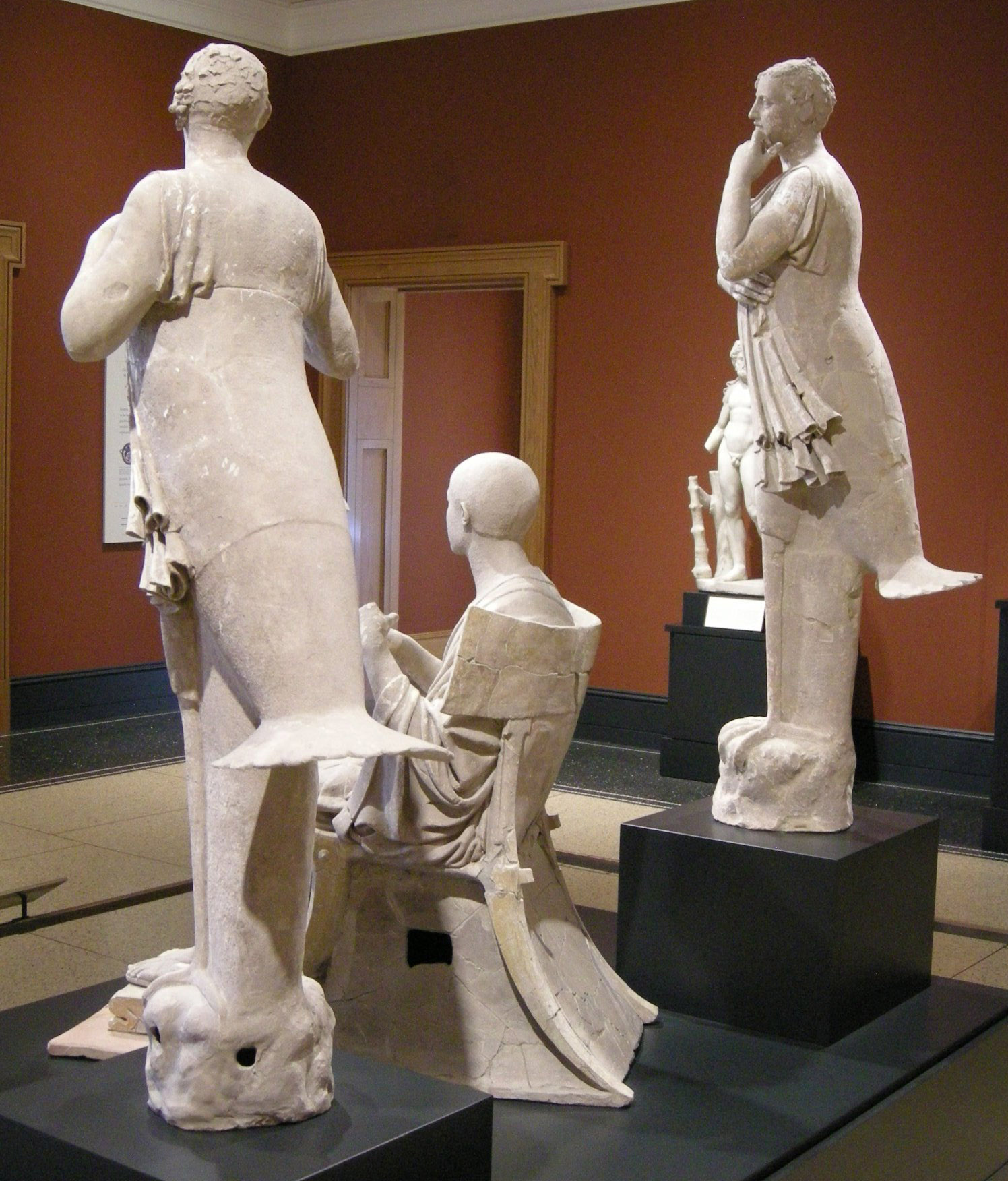
Sculpture group from the Getty Museum (rear view)

== Neoclassicism ==
The klismos was revived during the second, archaeological phase of European neoclassicism. Klismos chairs were first widely seen in Paris in the furniture made for the painter Jacques-Louis David by Georges Jacob in 1788, to be used as props in David's historical paintings, where the new sense of historicism required visual authenticity. It would be hard to find a French klismos chair earlier than the ones designed by the architect Jean-Jacques Lequeu in 1786 for a decor in the "Etruscan style" for the hôtel Montholon, boulevard Montmartre, and executed by Jacob; the furnishings have disappeared, but the watercolor designs are conserved in the Cabinet des Estampes. Simon Jervis has noted that Joseph Wright of Derby included the tablet of an approximation of a klismos chair in his Penelope Unraveling Her Web, 1783–84 (J. Paul Getty Museum).

In London, early klismos chairs were designed by Thomas Hope for his house in Duchess Street, London, which George Beaumont had described as early as 1804 as "more a Museum than anything else"; klismos chairs were illustrated by Hope in several variations in Household Furniture and Interior Decoration (1807), the record of his semi-public house-museum. Klismos chairs in their purest form furnished Hope's Picture Gallery (pl. II) and the Second Room containing Greek Vases (pl. IV), but the swept legs featured in variations on the classical theme illustrated in other plates. Henry Moses' illustration of genteel company playing cards seated on klismos chairs appeared in Hope's Designs of Modern Costume (c. 1812).

By the presence of fashionable klismos chairs and a collection of Greek vases, a self-portrait of Adam Buck and his family, significantly, was formerly thought to represent Thomas Hope. Klismos chairs were designed for Packington Hall, Warwickshire, by Joseph Bonomi.

In Philadelphia, the architect Benjamin Henry Latrobe designed a set of klismos chairs for an interior in the most advanced neoclassical taste for William Waln's drawing-room, c. 1808. Latrobe's design, painted cream and red on a black background, the "Etruscan" color range, included a panel of caning beneath the tablet backrest and legs that splayed outwards to the sides as well as the front. For the White House, Latrobe's designs of 1809 for klismos chairs are cautiously reinforced with stretchers to render them more sturdy. A range of early 19th-century American klismos chairs were included in the exhibition "Classical Taste in America, 1800–1840", Baltimore Museum of Art, 1993.

Such severely academic revivals might be compromised by more familiar features of the chair-maker's usual practice: an early 19th-century klismos chair by J.E. Höglander, Stockholm has a padded backrest, supported on five slender colonettes, and the faces of the legs are lightly paneled.

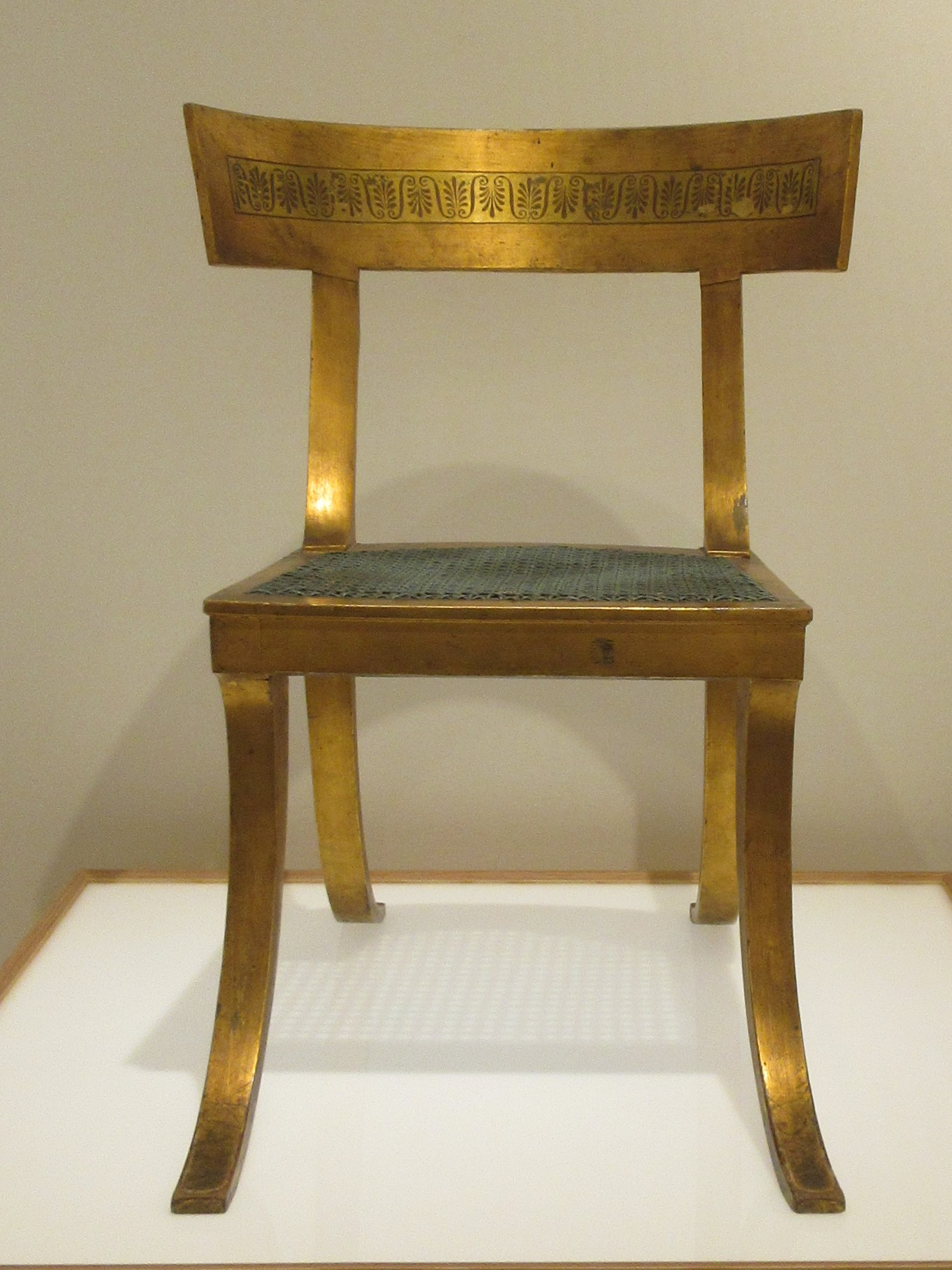
Klismos chair (c. 1790), Copenhagen, Denmark, Danish Design Museum

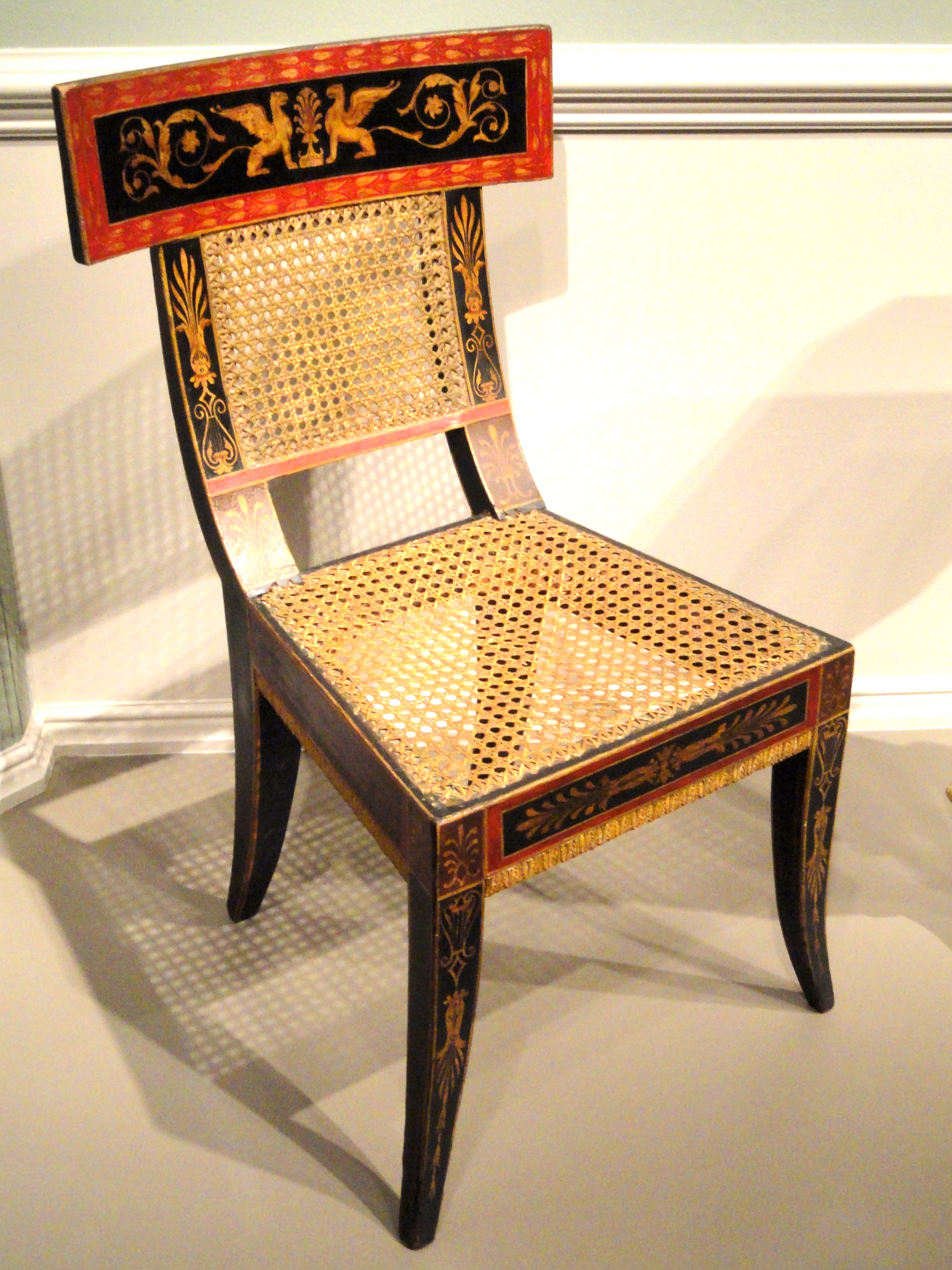
Klismos (1808), by Benjamin Henry Latrobe, Philadelphia, Pennsylvania, National Gallery of Art

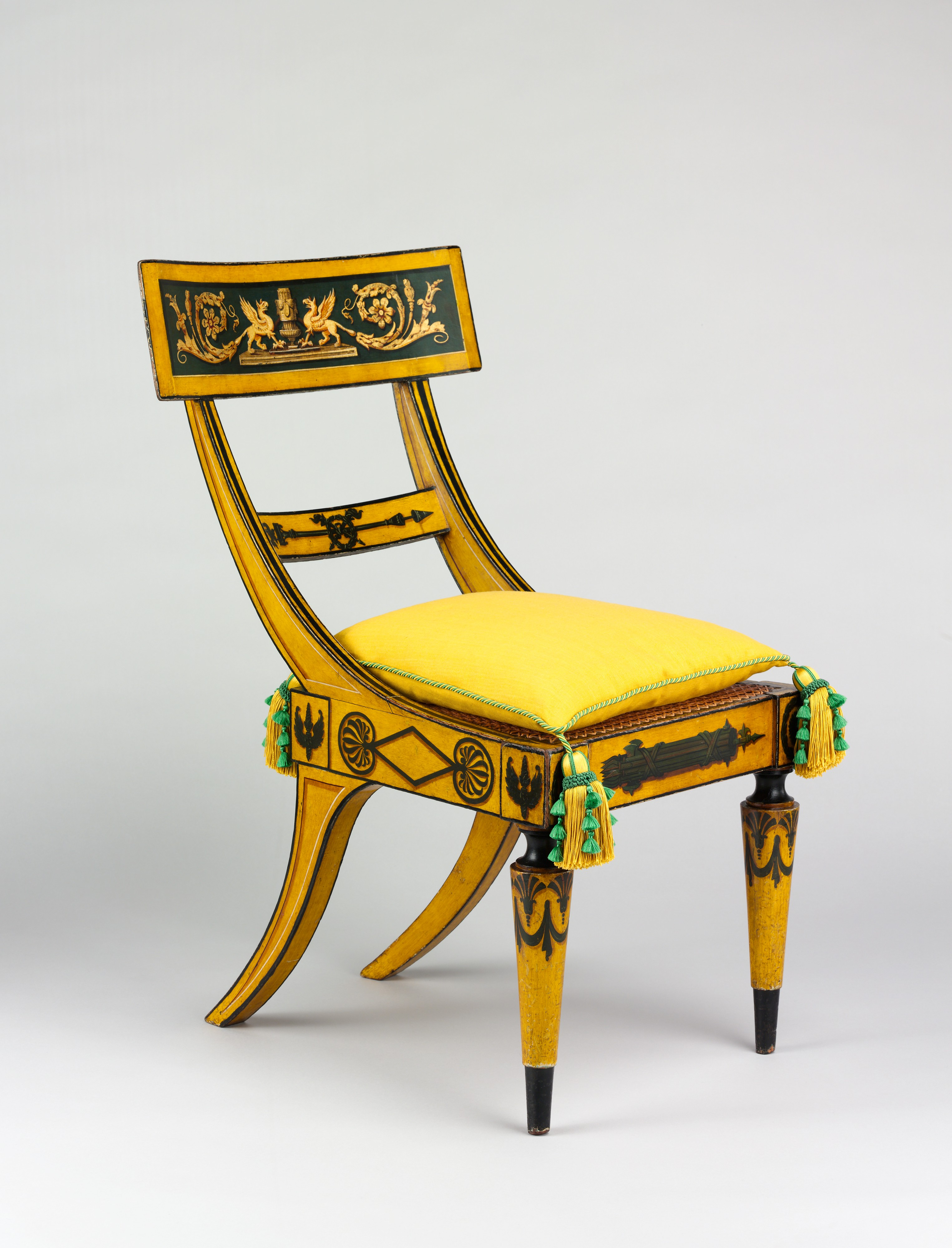
Klismos (c.1815-20) by John & Hugh Findlay, Baltimore, Maryland, Metropolitan Museum of Art

== 20th century ==
The classicizing phase of Modernism allied with Art Deco found the simple lines of the klismos once again in favor: klismos chairs designed by the Danish Edvard Thompson were illustrated in Architekten, 1922. In 1960, T. H. Robsjohn-Gibbings met Greek cabinetmakers Susan and Eleftherios Saridis, and, together, they created the Klismos line of furniture, recreating ancient Greek furnishings with some accuracy, including klismos chairs.

== See also ==
Media related to Klismoi at Wikimedia Commons
