= Casa Encantada =

1938 house in Bel-Air, Los Angeles

Coordinates: 34°4′49″N 118°26′39″W

The Casa Encantada at 10644 Bellagio Road in Bel Air, Los Angeles is a large detached neoclassical-style house completed in 1938. It was designed by James Dolena with interiors and furnishings by T. H. Robsjohn-Gibbings. It has twice established a record for the most expensive house sold in the United States.

== History ==
=== Commission and construction ===
The house was commissioned by Hilda Olsen Boldt Weber (1885–1951), who bought 9.5 acres on a hilltop site from the Bel-Air Country Club for $100,000 in 1936 (equivalent to $2.4 million in 2025). The architectural historian and real estate executive Jeffrey Hyland, writing in The Legendary Estates of Beverly Hills, describes the price as an "astonishing sum" in the midst of the Great Depression; comparable large estates had remained unsold for many years at similar prices. Unlike other prominent local residents, Weber was an outsider to the Los Angeles motion picture community and was a member of the nouveau riche, having married a wealthy glass manufacturer. The landscape architect Benjamin Morton Purdy redesigned the gardens in 1935 under Weber's patronage. The cornerstone was laid in May 1937 by Weber and her contractor, landscape designer, and architect. The house was completed in December 1938 at a total cost in excess of $2 million (equivalent to $46 million in 2025). Weber sought acceptance among the social elite of Los Angeles and threw large parties in an attempt to cement her position. The construction and decoration of the house had consumed almost her entire net worth, and she maintained a combined household and grounds staff of more than 40 employees. The cost of her lifestyle necessitated the sale of her other house in Santa Barbara to the Marymount School in 1942.

To showcase their new home, the Webers hosted a seated dinner for 250 guests and a dance shortly after Christmas 1938 at a cost of $50,000 (equivalent to $1.1 million in 2025). Louis B. Mayer said of the house that "If I had not gone inside myself I would not have believed such a residence existed in the world". The house was featured in an 18-page article in Architectural Digest in 1940. The completed interiors were photographed in 1938 by Maynard L. Parker, who had previously photographed Robsjohn-Gibbings's decorative work for the interior of Paul Flato's shop at 8637 Sunset Boulevard in Hollywood.

=== Conrad Hilton ===
Weber put the house and its contents up for sale in 1948 for $1.5 million, less than its original construction cost a decade earlier. Prospective buyers included the set designer Cedric Gibbons and his wife Dolores del Río, the Metro-Goldwyn-Mayer co-founder Louis B. Mayer, and the publisher William Randolph Hearst. It sold in November 1950 to Conrad Hilton for $225,000 (equivalent to $3 million in 2025), who occupied the house until his death in 1979. Weber committed suicide by overdosing on sleeping pills the year after the sale, overwhelmed by her precarious financial situation and unpaid bills. Hilton described his enchantment with the house as "a case of love at first sight...I couldn't resist it, one of the fabulous houses of the world" and renamed the property the Casa Encantada. Hilton preserved the house and its contents for several decades, which Hyland described as an "extraordinary time capsule of high-style 1940s taste".

=== Later owners ===
Following Hilton's death, the house was sold in 1980 to the financier David H. Murdock for $12.4 million (equivalent to $48.5 million in 2025), establishing a record for the most expensive house sold in the United States. He renamed the property the Bellagio House. In 1981, Murdock sold the original Robsjohn-Gibbings furniture that had been designed for the house at a two-day sale that fetched $700,000; the individual pieces have remained popular with collectors. Murdock used the house to display his extensive collection of English furniture and redesigned the landscaped grounds. In 2000, he sold the property to the businessman Gary Winnick for $94 million (equivalent to $176 million in 2025), again setting the record for the most expensive house sold in the United States. Winnick had originally intended to build his own house on nearby plots of land, but was invited to the property by Murdock, and the two agreed on the sale over breakfast. Winnick subsequently acquired some of the original Robsjohn-Gibbings furnishings and restored them to the Casa Encantada. In his home office, Winnick displayed a replica of Gilbert Stuart's Athenaeum Portrait of George Washington and a framed copy of the Twelfth Amendment to the United States Constitution. Architect Peter Marino restored and enhanced the house over two years at a cost of several million dollars under Winnick's patronage.

In October 2019, the Casa Encantada was listed for sale by Winnick through Rick Hilton and Jeffrey Hyland's agency Hilton & Hyland for $225 million. The house is hidden from the street and surrounded by mature trees and the golf courses of the Bel-Air Country Club. Hyland speculated in 2019 that the land value alone was $175 million and that it would be impossible to duplicate such a residence in the present era owing to a shortage of craftspeople and prohibitive building costs.

The Wall Street Journal reported that Peter Thiel purchased the home for $130 million in a July 2026 foreclosure auction.

== Design ==
=== Architecture and grounds ===
Weber commissioned James Dolena to design her new residence in March 1936. Dolena's working drawings described the style as "modern Georgian with Grecian influences", a nod to the Georgian revival architecture then in vogue, with influences from ancient Greek and Roman architecture.

The main house is designed in an H-shape. The house and its outbuildings were constructed from reinforced concrete with a stone-colored finish. An Italianate fountain in the driveway court to the north forms the extremity of an axial plan that passes through the center of the house, culminating in a pool house on a ridge overlooking a golf course. A large foyer greeted guests through the front door, with a circular stairway leading to the upper floors. A gallery with floor-to-ceiling windows opened onto a south-facing patio overlooking terraced lawns that descended to the swimming pool and cabana. The garden features were inspired by ancient Greek and Roman landscapes and included bronze sculptures and fountains designed by the American sculptor Gladys Lewis Bush.

The finished house and its outbuildings totalled 40,000 sq ft. The main house alone was almost 30,000 sq ft, with servants' quarters in the two-story garage and a two-story guesthouse. Amenities on the grounds included badminton and tennis courts with spectator galleries and a swimming pool. A tunnel connected the grounds to the fairways of the Bel-Air Country Club. In recent decades the grounds have also included a basketball court, a rose garden, and koi ponds.

=== Interiors ===
Robsjohn-Gibbings's work for the Casa Encantada is not rooted in a single dominant aesthetic style, though it embodies neo-classicism, incorporating the art of Ancient Greece and elements of Art Deco. The interior was the responsibility of Peterson Studios of Santa Barbara and the English furniture and interior designer T. H. Robsjohn-Gibbings, who created and manufactured carpets, fabrics, and more than two hundred pieces of furniture for the house. Each piece was stamped "Robsjohn-Gibbings – Sans epoque" to express the timelessness of his creations and their freedom from any individual historical period. Weber's patronage of Robsjohn-Gibbings was atypical among her contemporaries, who tended to purchase overpriced reproduction furniture from department stores.

Hilton self-published a book about the house in which he described the "clearly discernible Greek influences" of the house, with its aesthetic lines sweeping in "regal beauty...carry[ing] a classical motif into the interior through columns of Doric and Ionic simplicity. Doors, rugs, upholstering, draperies, decorative objects, all bear the integrating mark of the Greek key design". The setting of the house, along with its rich colors and the harmonic texture of its design, had helped "shrink the architectural mass a third of a city block in size to the conceptual intimacy of a country cottage".
