= Desert Breath =

Land art near Hurghada, Egypt

- 27.3804°N 33.6322°E

Desert Breath, located beside Highway 11 in the Egyptian desert directly West of El Gouna near Hurghada on the Red Sea coast, is a double-spiral work of land art.

It was created by the D.A.ST. Arteam, a group made up of three Greek artists - Danae Stratou, sculptor, Alexandra Stratou, industrial designer, and Stella Konstantinidis, architect. The work, completed on 7 March 1997, covers an area of about 10 hectares (25 acres). It consists of 89 protruding cones of gradually increasing size set in a spiral and another 89 depressed (incised) cones set in spirals. The sand dug out from the depressed cones was used to create the protruding cones, resulting in the displacement of 8,000 cubic meters (10,000 cu yd) of sand. At the center of the art piece used to be a body of water 30 meters (98 feet) in diameter which has since evaporated. The artwork is subject to natural erosion and in due course the area will revert to original desert plain. It is viewable by satellite pictures via Google Earth.

== Intention of the project ==
The artists have stated that the project was meant to suggest an experience of infinity with the desert as a landscape of the mind. Even though it is in a state of slow disintegration, Desert Breath is still viewable two decades after its creation. Through its slow disintegration, the installation has been seen as an instrument to measure the passage of time.
