= Descanso Gardens =

Botanical garden in La Cañada Flintridge, California

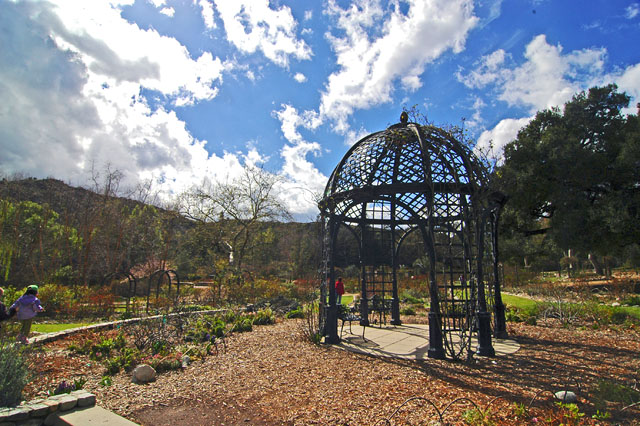
- Descanso Gardens rosarium

- Location within the Los Angeles metropolitan area Location within California Location within the United States
- Type: Botanical garden
- Location: La Cañada Flintridge
- Coordinates: 34°12′05″N 118°12′35″W
- Area: 150 acres (61 ha)
- Open: 9 am-5 pm
- Status: Open year-round
- Website: Official website

Descanso Gardens is a 150-acre (61 ha) botanical garden located in La Cañada Flintridge, Los Angeles County, California. It sits on the northern edge of the San Rafael Hills.

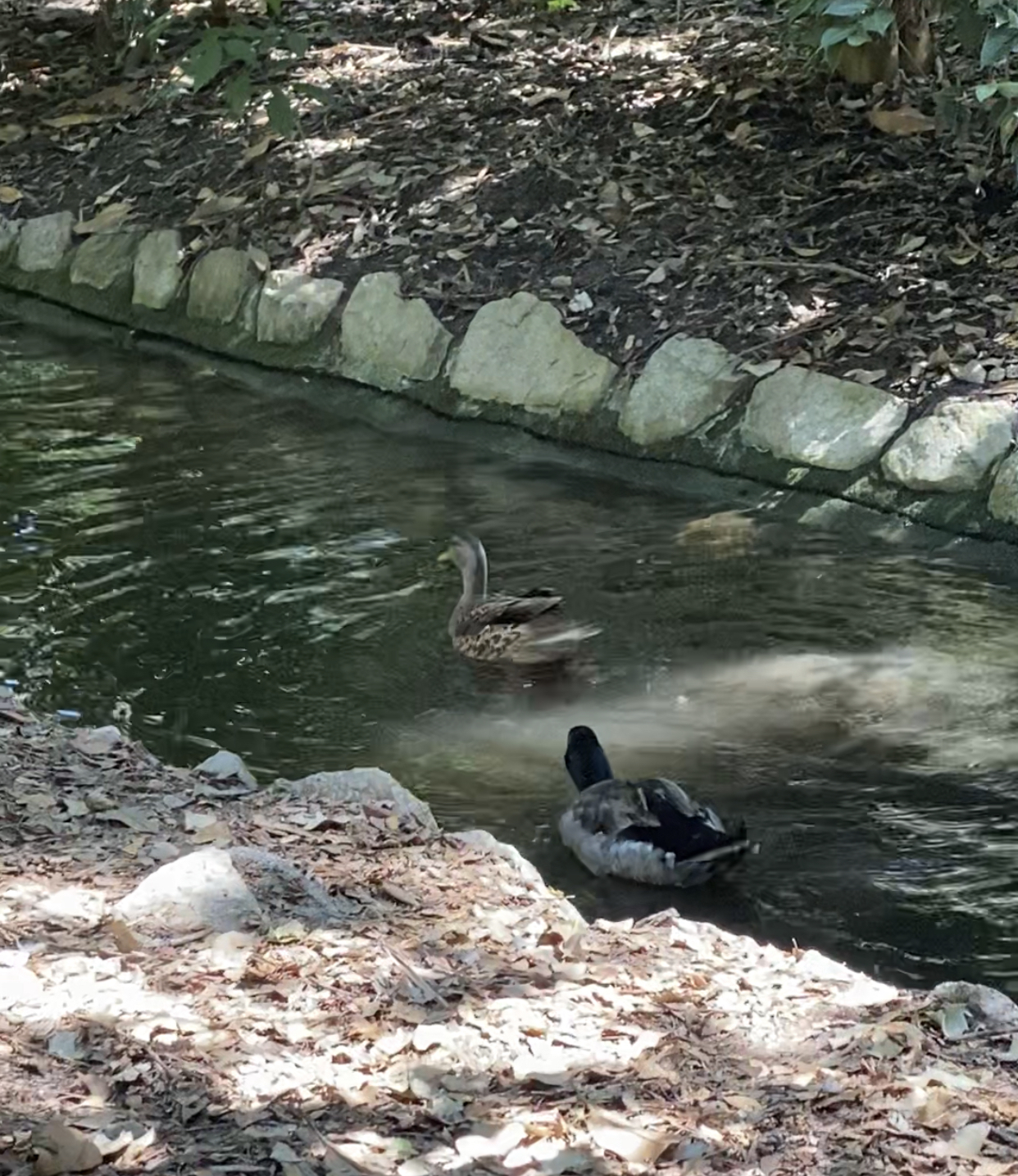
Stream with ducks at Camellia Forest

Descanso Gardens features a wide area, mostly forested, with artificial streams, ponds, and lawns. Descanso Gardens has a wide collection of fruit trees, including orange, peach, pear, pomegranate, crabapple, fruits of the genus prunus, grapes, and passionfruit.

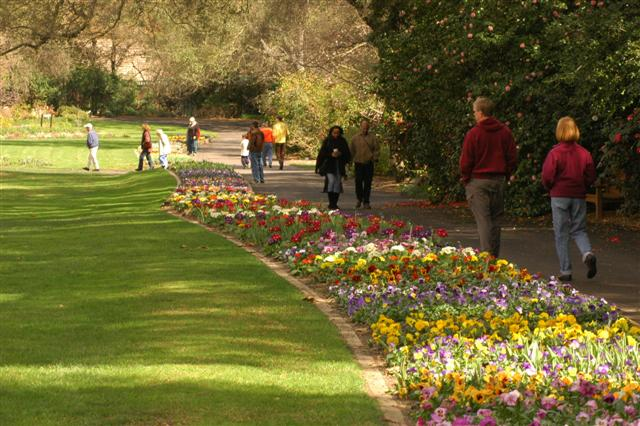
Walkway in Descanso Gardens

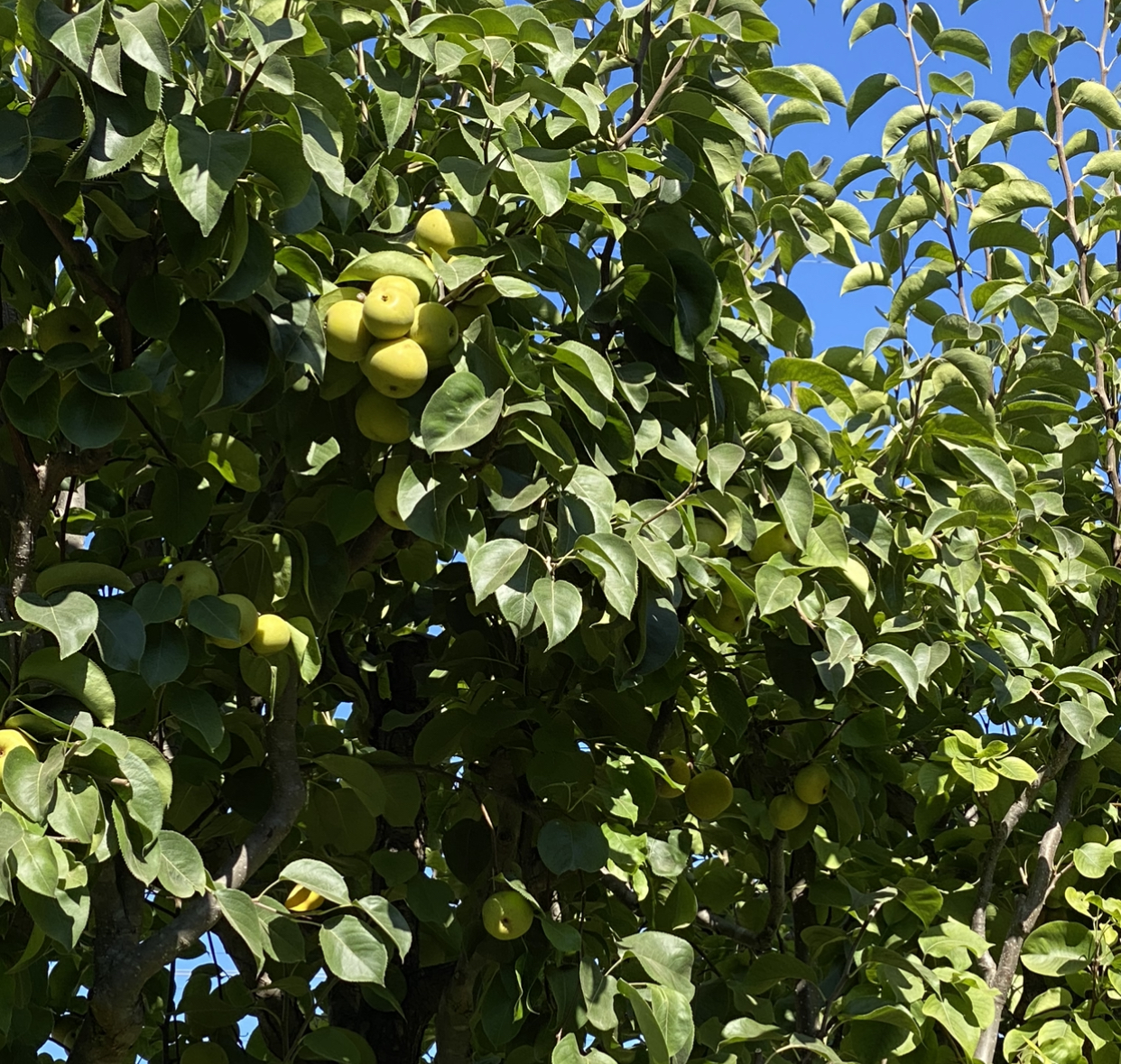
Pear tree, Descanso Gardens

== History ==
The first Spanish governor of California deeded this land as part of a vast 36,000-acre rancho to Corporal José María Verdugo in 1784 for his loyal service. The property remained in the Verdugo family until 1869.

In 1937, the property was purchased by E. Manchester Boddy, owner of The Los Angeles Illustrated Daily News, and managed as a working ranch, which he called Rancho del Descanso. He built a two-story mansion of 22 rooms, designed by Beverly Hills architect James E. Dolena. He also purchased more than 400 acres north of the original property, the source of mountain streams that provide water for Descanso Gardens today. In 1942, when people of Japanese ancestry were forced into internment camps following the attack on Pearl Harbor, Boddy purchased up to 100,000 camellia plants from two Japanese-owned nurseries in the San Gabriel Valley run by his friends, the Uyematsu and Yoshimura families. He built his camellia collection – and later his rose and lilac collections – assisted by horticulturist J. Howard Asper and hybridizer Dr. Walter E. Lammerts.

In 1953, Boddy sold this property to Los Angeles County and moved to San Diego County. Four years later, local volunteers formed the Descanso Gardens Guild, Inc. Now a 501(c) organization, the Guild today manages all garden operations in a public/private partnership with Los Angeles County. The gardens were listed on the National Register of Historic Places in 2021.

In 1995, the gardens were featured in Visiting... with Huell Howser Episode 310.

== Layout ==
When one first enters the property there is a large parking lot in front of the entrance. In the entrance is the admissions building, the restaurant, as well as a gift shop. There are sixteen locations people can visit in the gardens. There are also many buildings and structures that are open to guests.

== Collections ==
- Ancient Forest

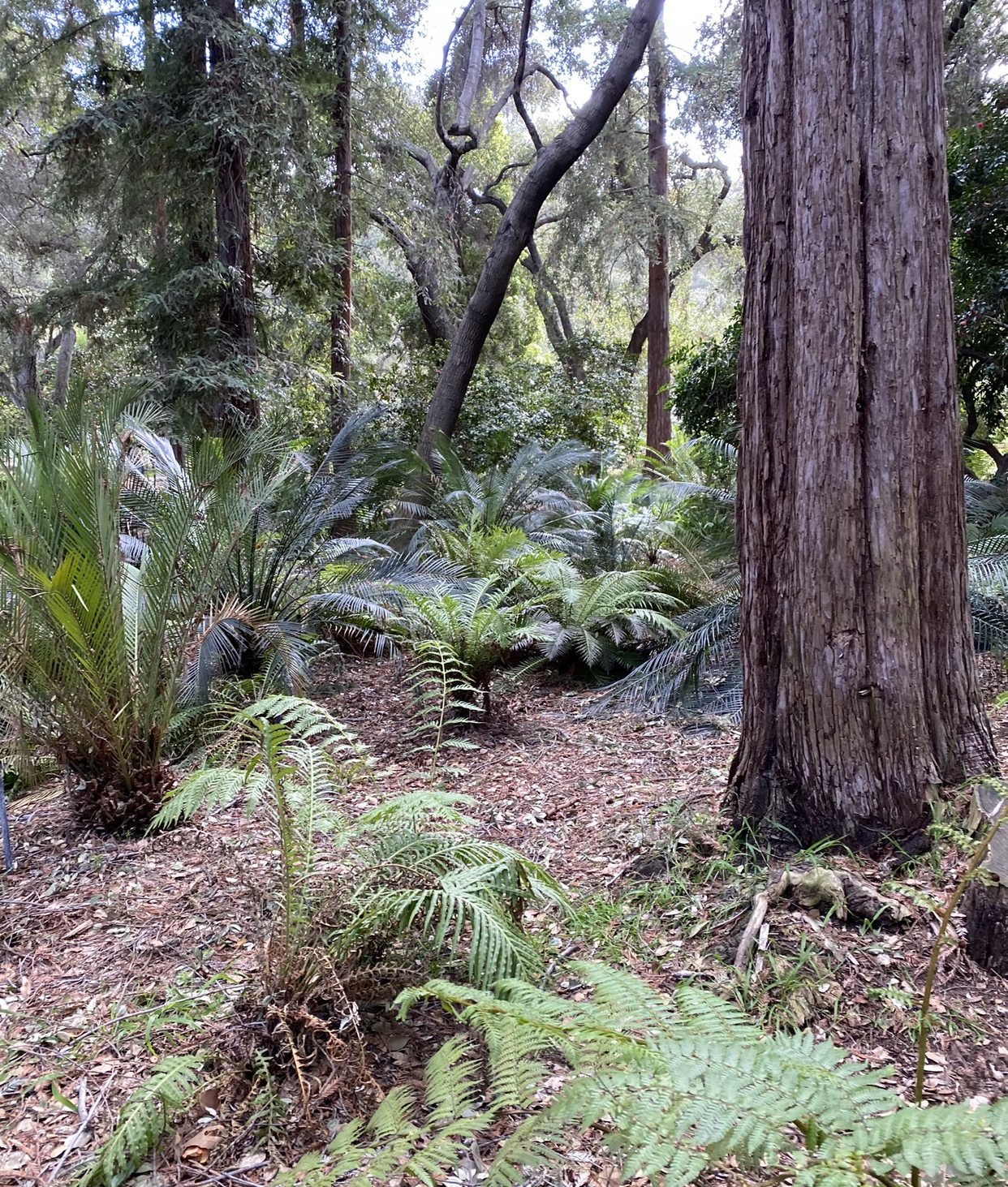
Ancient forest

- California Garden
- Camellia Forest

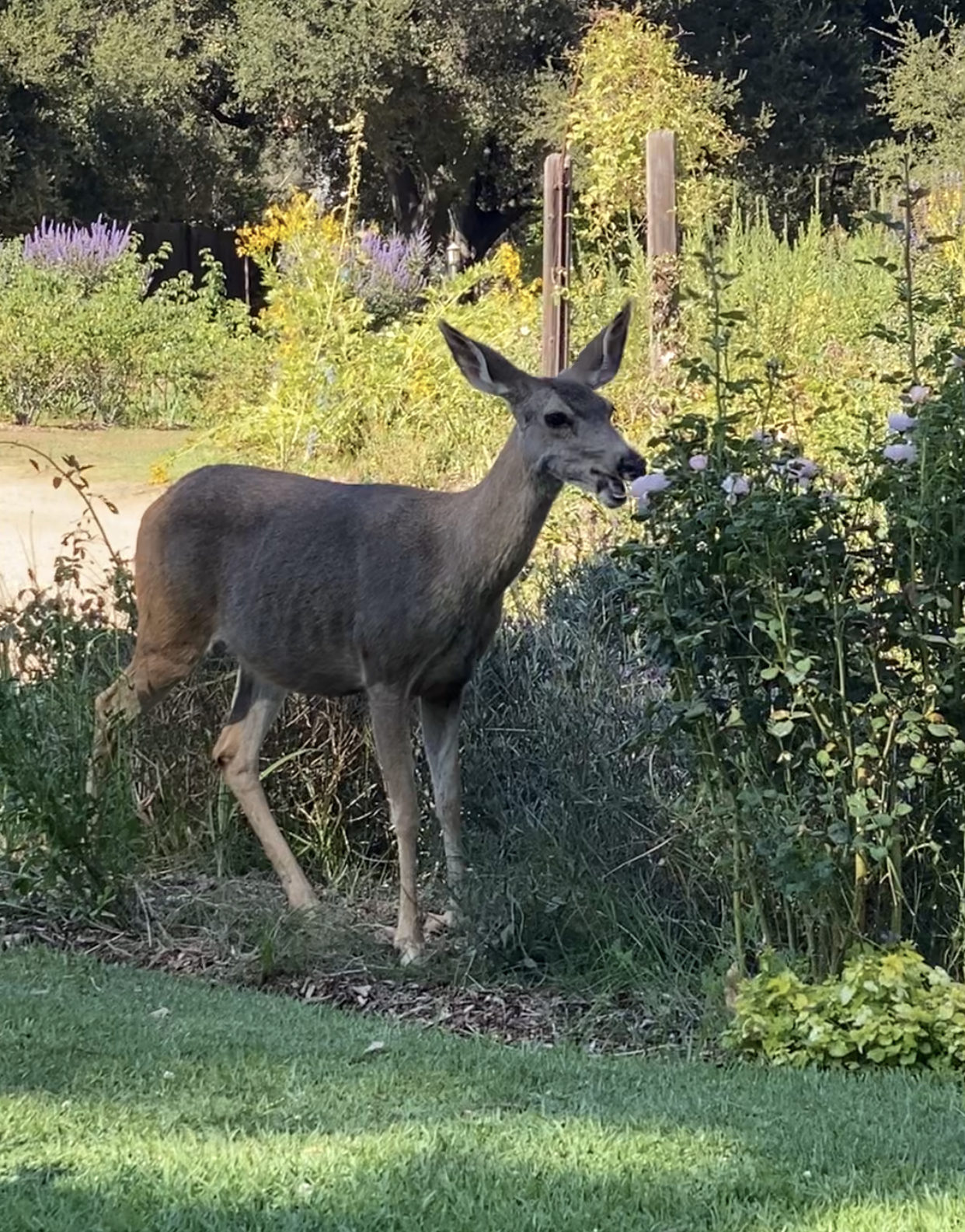
deer feeding on rose flowers at Descanso Rosarium

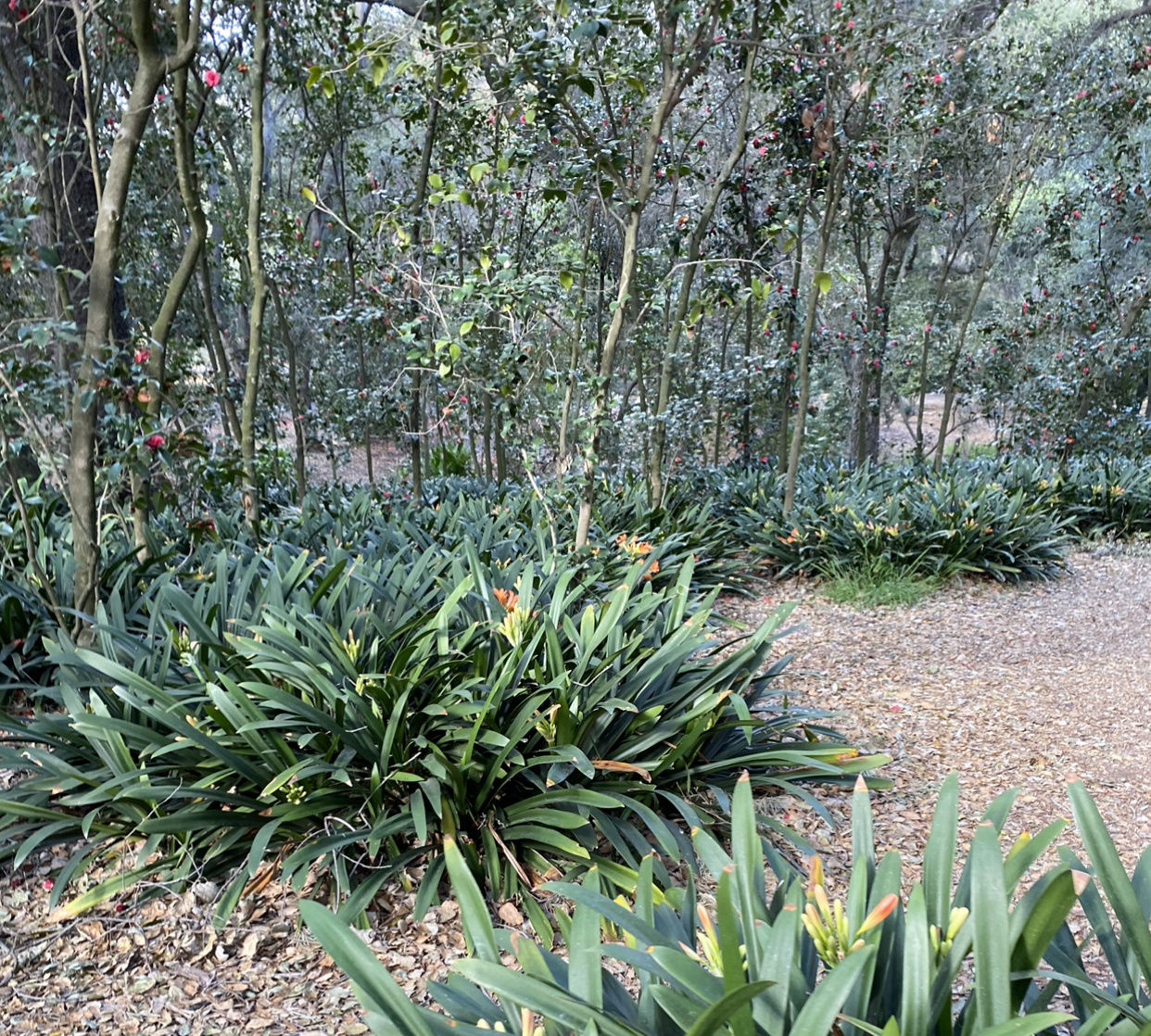
Camellia forest

- Promenade
- Japanese Garden
- Lilac Garden
- Hilltop Gardens

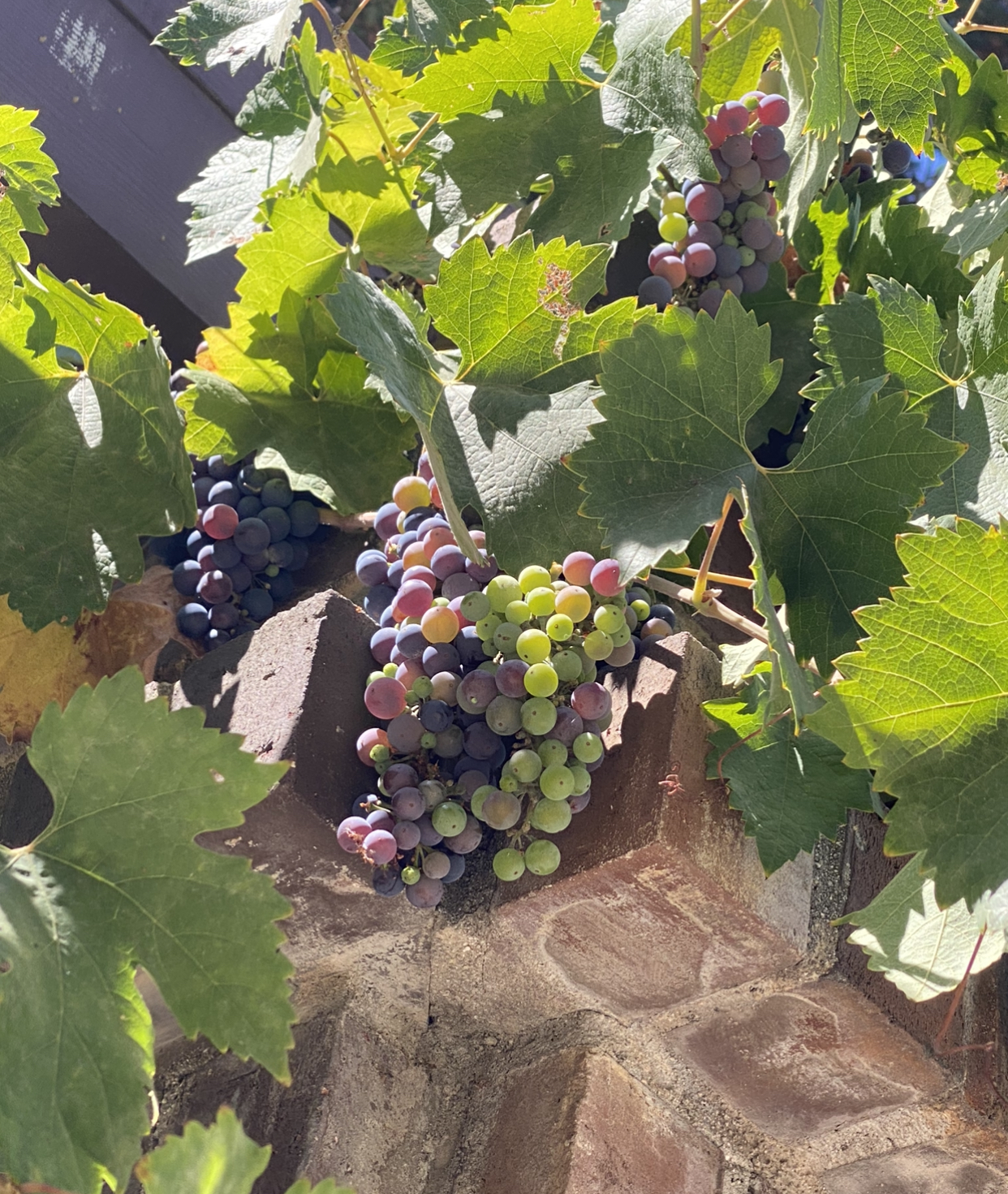
Grapes at Descanso Nature's Table

- Oak Grove

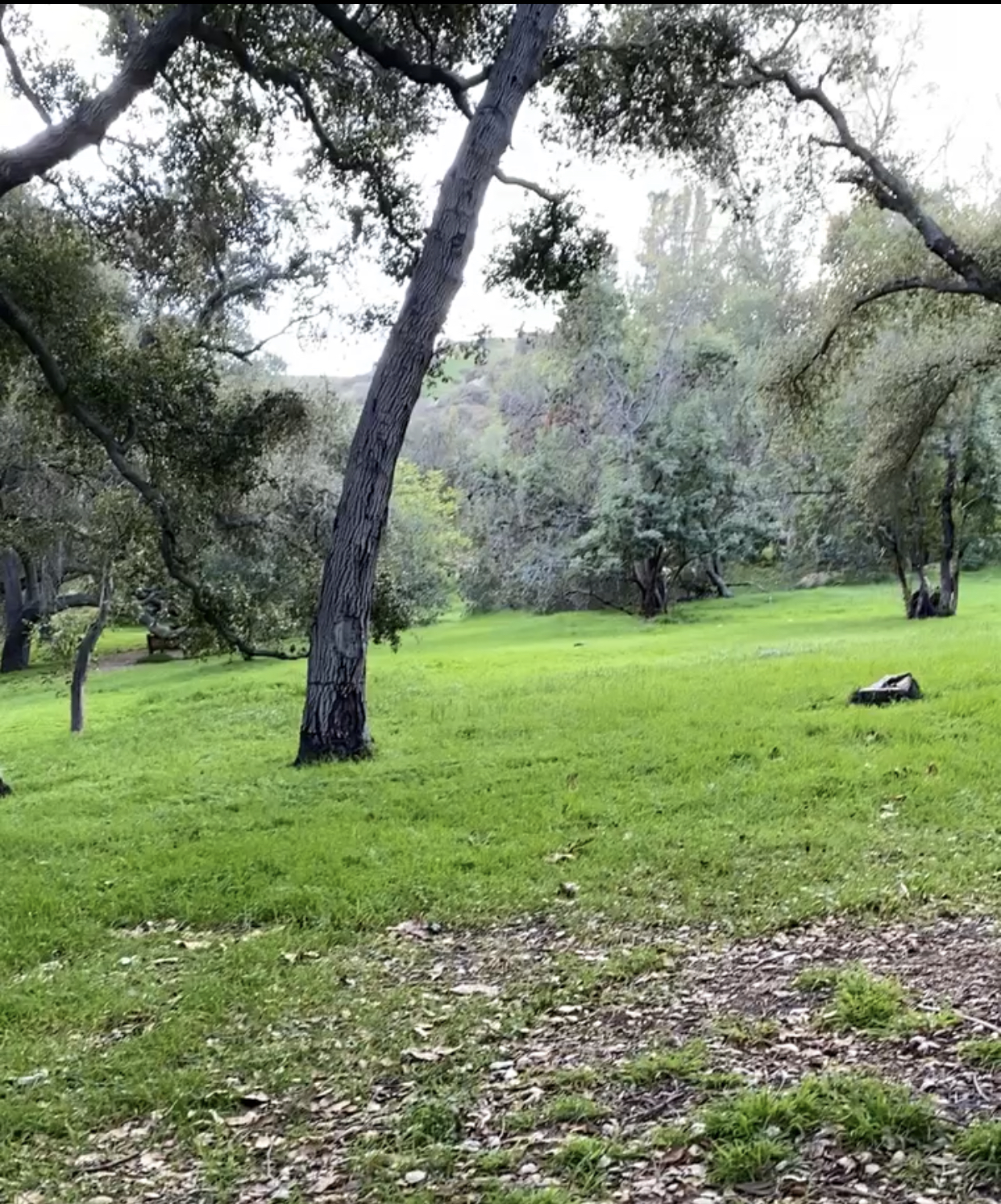
Lawn in Oak forest

- Oak Woodland
- Rose Garden

== Animals ==
Descanso Gardens homes many different animal species native to the area. The species native to La Canada Flintridge include deer, mountain lions, birds, snakes, and squirrels. Many of these animals feed on the plants in the gardens as well as live in the plant life.

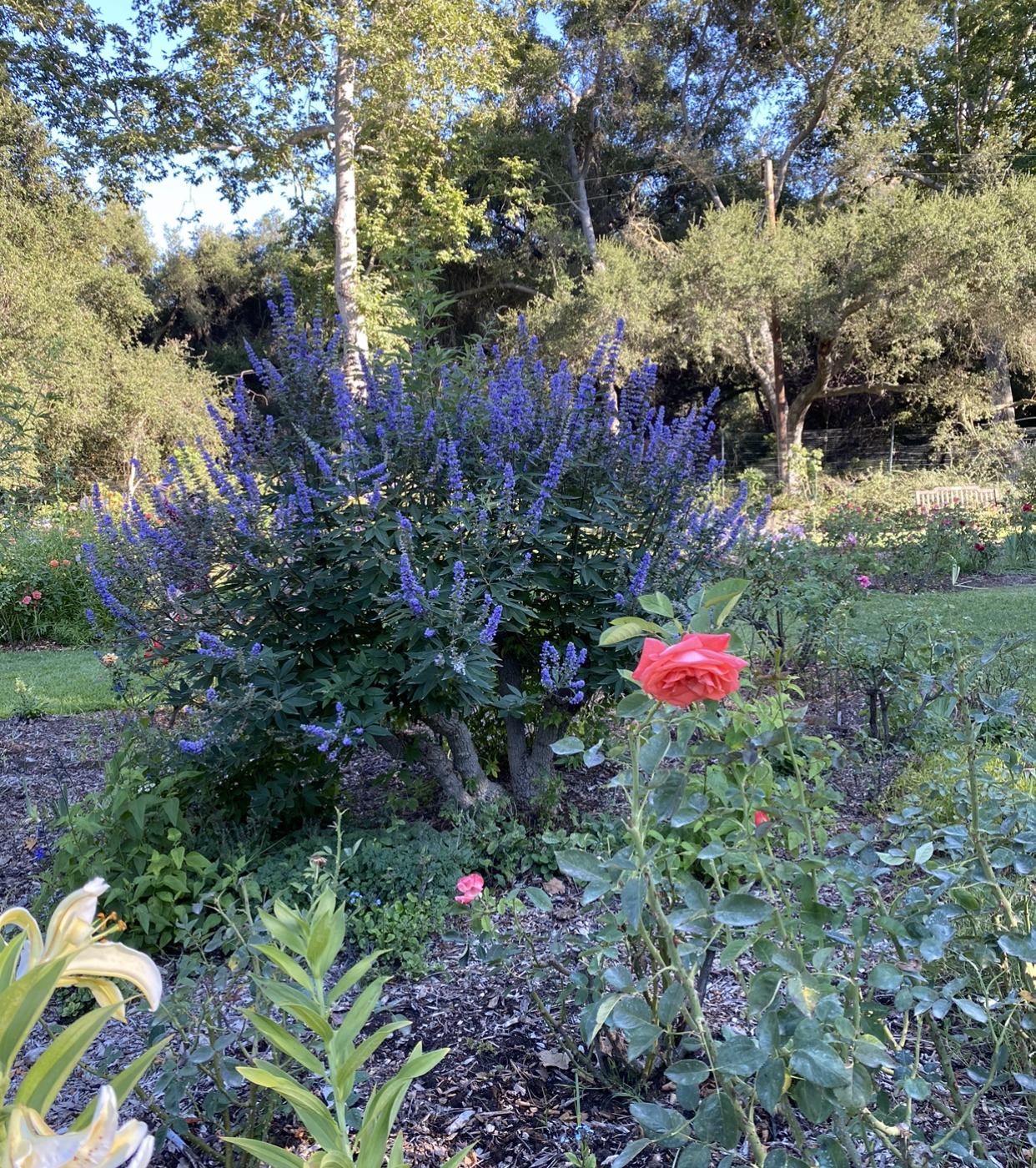
Rose garden. Descanso

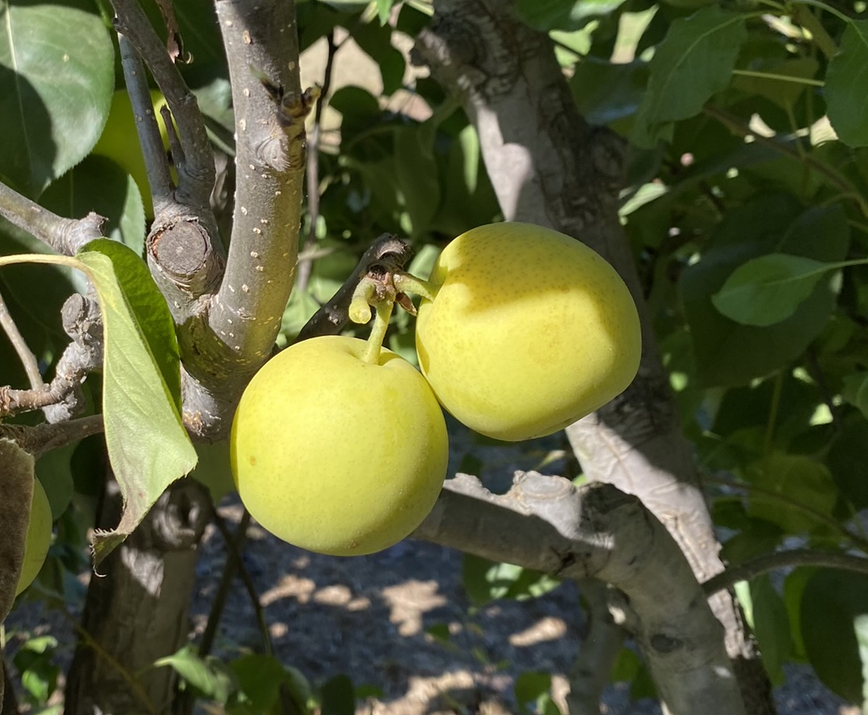
Pears at Descanso rosarium

== Boddy House ==
The Boddy House is the original 22-room mansion built by E. Manchester Boddy and designed by James Dolena in the Hollywood Regency style in 1937. The house is located in the far southeast corner of the property, overlooking the San Gabriel Mountains.

In 2007, the Boddy House was rehabilitated for the 43rd annual Pasadena Showcase House of Design, and decorated in a contemporary re-interpretation of its original Hollywood Regency style. Subsequently, a major grant from the Ahmanson Foundation enabled the addition of a museum-quality Heritage Exhibit, with exhibits about the gardens, Manchester Boddy's life and times, and important donors and volunteers for the Descanso Gardens. Executive Director David Brown led the 2007 rehabilitation of the Boddy House; he planned to retire in 2017 after 12 years leading the botanic gardens. In 2019, the Boddy House was once again reimagined by Showcase House designers.

== Sturt Haaga Gallery ==
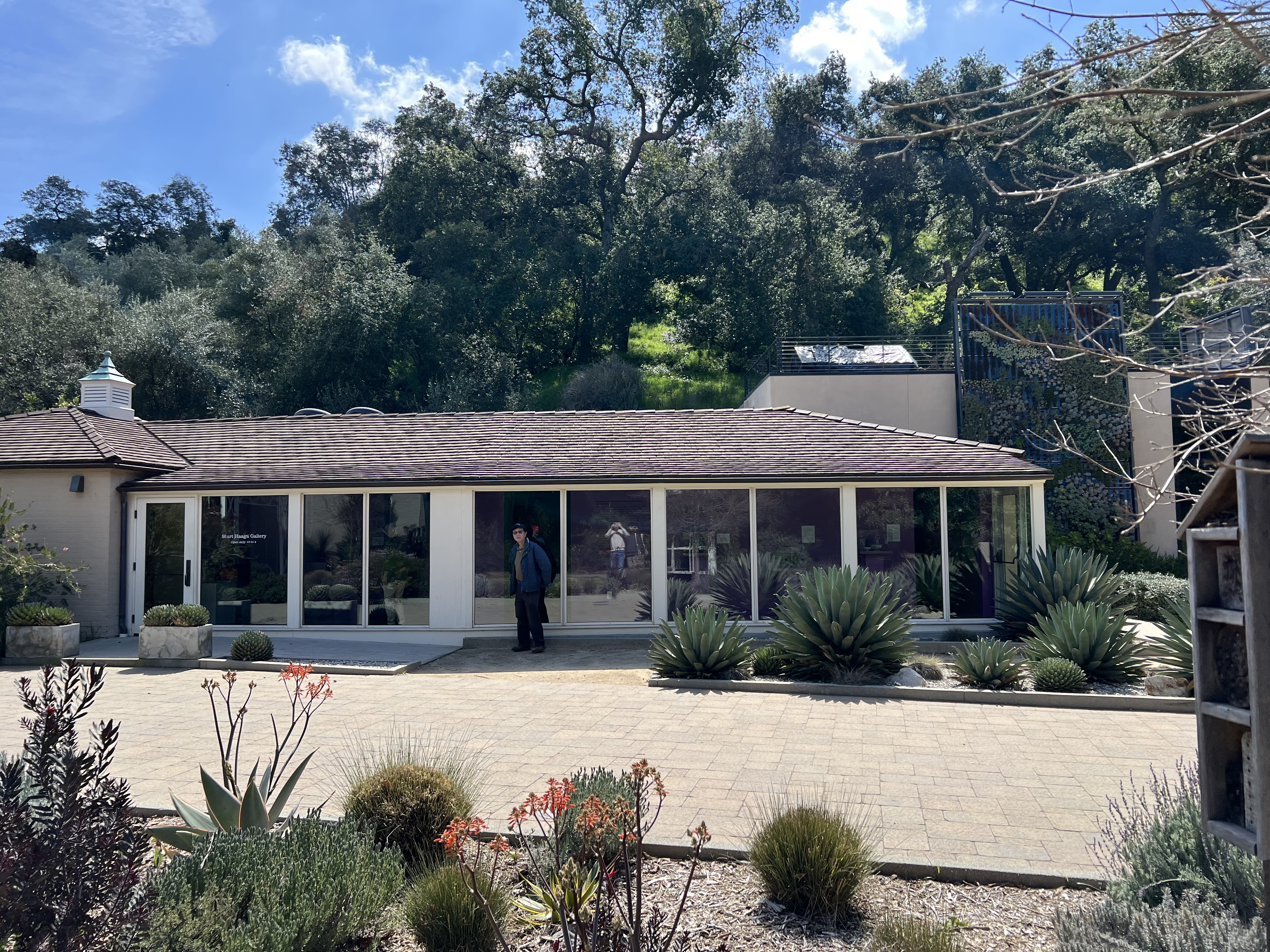
Outside of the Sturt Haaga Gallery

The Sturt Haaga Gallery opened in the autumn of 2011. The gallery is named for the initial gift of $2.1 million from Heather Sturt Haaga and Paul G. Haaga Jr. Other donations followed, also from private entities.

Boddy's original garage was restored and houses two galleries. The facility was enhanced by the addition of a contemporary structure which doubled the size for exhibitions and with its 12 feet (3.7 m) ceilings allowed larger single pieces of art, completing the rehabilitation of site buildings begun in 2007. The contemporary structure was designed by the architects Frederick Fisher & Partners and completed in 2011.

The Gallery presents three exhibitions per year. The focus is on work by contemporary artists that portrays themes and subjects relevant to its setting in the Descanso Gardens. The first exhibit of 2014 included works by over 150 contemporary artists, some entered in a jury competition, others commissioned by the Gardens. The exhibition involved contemporary photographs of the Descanso Gardens in a video gallery, using the hashtag #Portraitsofthegarden to collect the photos from social media web sites Twitter and Instagram.

In the first half of 2023 the Sturt Haaga Gallery is showing the exhibit SHIKI: The Four Seasons in Japanese Art. The exhibit is from Scripps College collection. The collection includes Kimonos and paintings that display the four seasons.

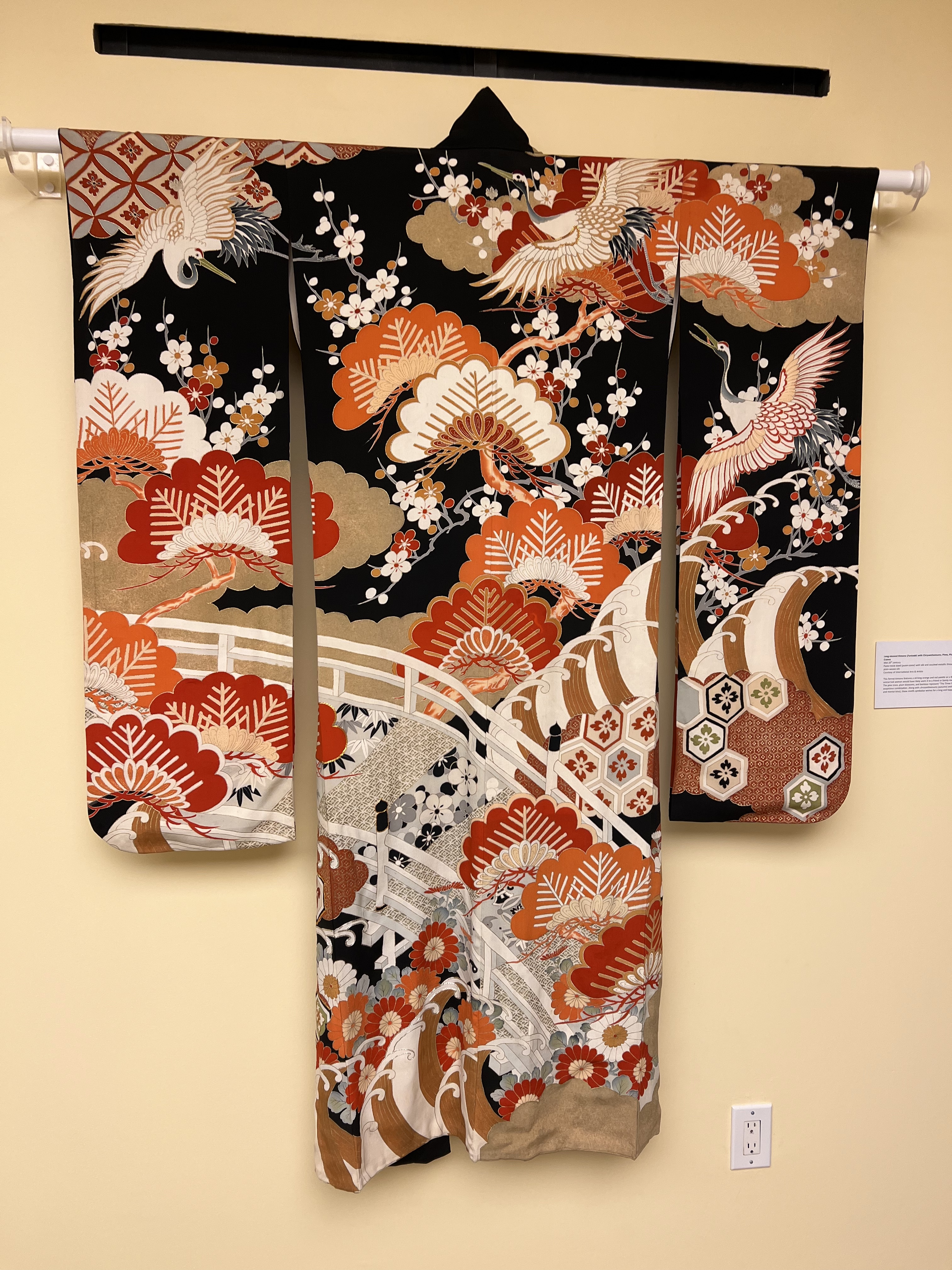
Kimono from Sturt Haaga Gallery in the SHIKI four seasons collection

== Food ==
The Kitchen at Descanso is before the formal entrance. Some of the items on the menu include items grown in the gardens. It also includes drink items like coffee, house made hibiscus lemonade, as well as alcoholic beverages.

Descanso Gardens also does catering for various events. The gardens are a popular venue for weddings.

== Activities ==
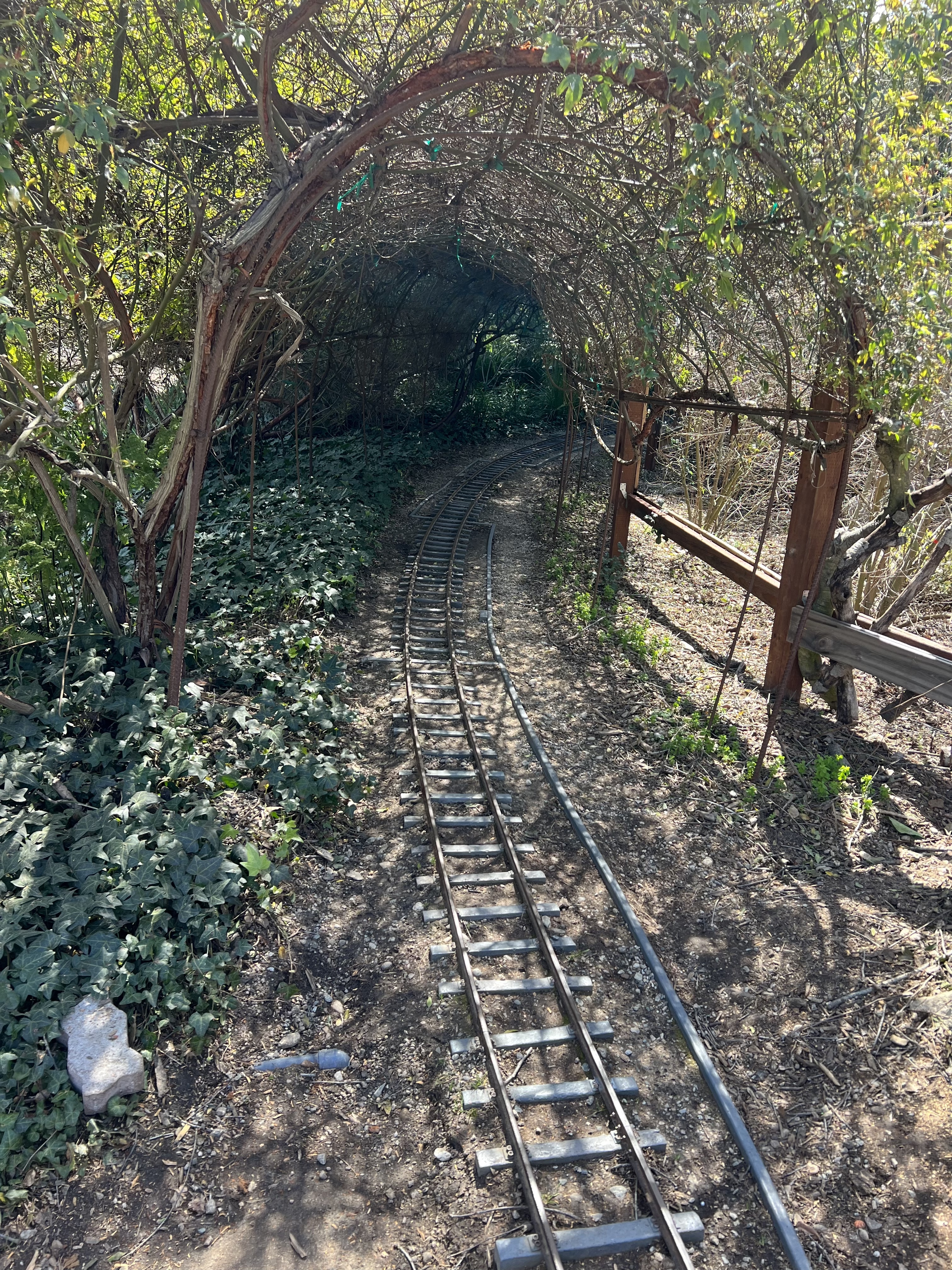
Enchanted Railroad at Descanso Gardens

The Enchanted Railroad is a small diesel train that the Gardens allows guests to ride on. The track circles the promenade garden. In the Japanese Garden there is a tea house where events are held on occasion. There is also an Amphitheater on the main lawn of Descanso Gardens.

== Events ==
Descanso holds many small events in the gardens including yoga, tours, and events for members only. In the summer, special programming like the Music and Dance events, Little Explorers and Roots of Cool take place. Other large events include Enchanted and Carved. Every year in the winter months Descanso Gardens has a light and art show called Enchanted. There is a set path that guests walk through and see all the lights as well as art installations. Carved is a Halloween themed event that has carved pumpkins as well as other typical Halloween activities every year in the fall season.
