= Gary Winnick =

American financier (1947–2023)

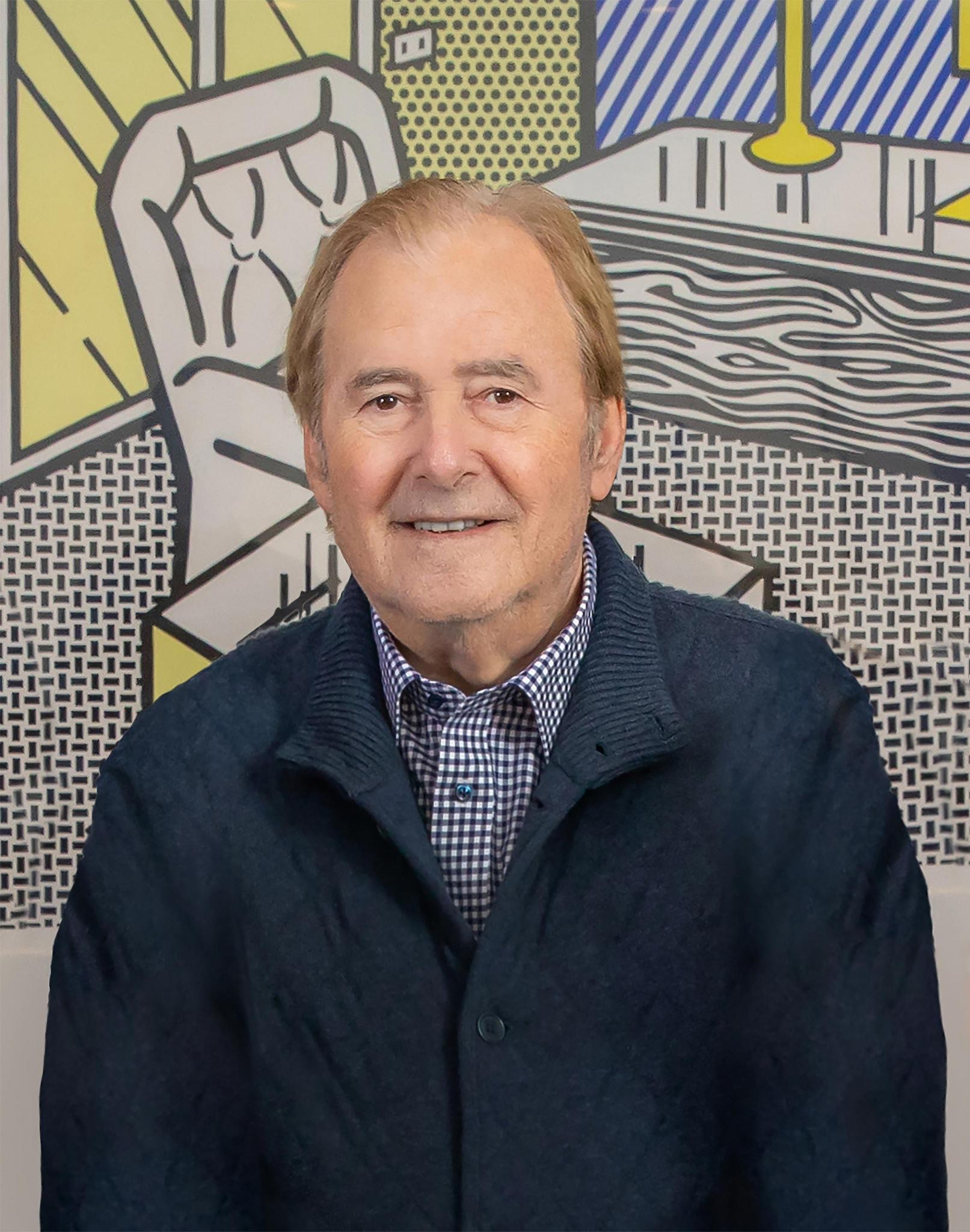
- Winnick in 2012
- Born: October 13, 1947; New York City, New York, U.S.
- Died: November 4, 2023 (aged 76); Los Angeles, California, U.S.
- Education: B.A. C.W. Post College, Long Island University (LIU Post)
- Occupation: Financier
- Known for: Senior Vice President, Drexel Burnham Lambert, Founder and Chairman, Global Crossing, Chairman, Winnick & Company
- Spouse: Karen Winnick
- Children: 3

Gary Winnick (October 13, 1947 – November 4, 2023) was an American billionaire businessman, industrialist, and investment banker. He served as the chairman and CEO of Winnick & Company, a private equity firm that he originally established as Pacific Capital Group in 1985. In 2020, he established WCO Spectrum, a company that invests in wireless spectrum licenses in the United States.

== Early life ==
Winnick was raised in a Jewish family on Long Island, New York. He is the son of Blanche and Arnold Winnick.

Winnick's first business was a snow-removal operation, which he ran when he was 12 years of age. He employed other children in his neighborhood to clear local roads and driveways.

Winnick attended public schools on Long Island and graduated from Roslyn High School in Roslyn, New York in 1965. He attended C.W. Post College, part of Long Island University, graduating in 1969.

== Career ==
Winnick's first job in financial services was as a bond salesman with Drexel Burnham Lambert. In 1978, he joined the staff of Michael Milken at Drexel's high-yield bond operation in California. He was head of the convertible desk.

Winnick's work at Drexel provided initial capital and mid-cap financing to new U.S. companies in the fields of telecommunications, healthcare and gaming. Winnick is also credited with proposing the design of the California unit's X-shaped trading desk in Beverly Hills.

In 1985, Winnick founded a private equity firm.

In 1996, Winnick formed a partnership with the AFL-CIO that was responsible for reviving the stalled Playa Vista development in Los Angeles, a large planned community on the Westside of Los Angeles.

=== Global Crossing ===
In 1998, Winnick founded Global Crossing, an early global fiber-optic network company which by 1999 was valued at $20 billion. The company owned and managed fiber optic networks in more than 50 countries and connections in more than 70 countries in North America, Europe, Latin America and Asia. The company filed for bankruptcy in 2002 amid allegations of accounting fraud and other financial irregularities.

Winnick was investigated for insider trading regarding Global Crossing. He allegedly sold large amounts of his Global Crossing stock while having non-public information about the company's financial troubles and impending bankruptcy. These stock sales attracted scrutiny from regulators and investors who claimed he benefited personally while other shareholders suffered significant losses.

Winnick and other executives at the company were also accused of providing misleading information to investors. They allegedly downplayed the company's financial problems and painted an overly positive picture of its prospects, which led some investors to make ill-informed decisions.

Winnick was not charged in relation to the bankruptcy, and he settled a lawsuit related to the case for $55 million without admitting guilt.

Winnick and other executives were also criticized for their excessive compensation packages, with CNN Money describing him as an "emperor of greed" for using Global Crossing as his "personal cash cow".

== Personal life ==
Winnick was married to Karen B. Winnick, president of the Los Angeles Zoo Commission and author of children's books. The couple had three children and eight grandchildren.

In 2000, Winnick and his wife purchased and restored "Casa Encantada", a 40,000 square foot, 1930s-era trophy property in the Bel Air neighborhood of Los Angeles, formerly owned by Conrad Hilton.

Winnick died at his home in Bel Air, Los Angeles, on November 4, 2023, at the age of 76.

== Philanthropy and awards ==
In 1983, Winnick and his wife, Karen, founded The Winnick Family Foundation.

In May 2000, Gary Winnick received the Simon Wiesenthal Center's Humanitarian Laureate Award.

In June 2016, Winnick received an honorary doctorate from Long Island University, from which he had graduated in 1969.
