= Springfield Furniture Company =

- U.S. National Register of Historic Places
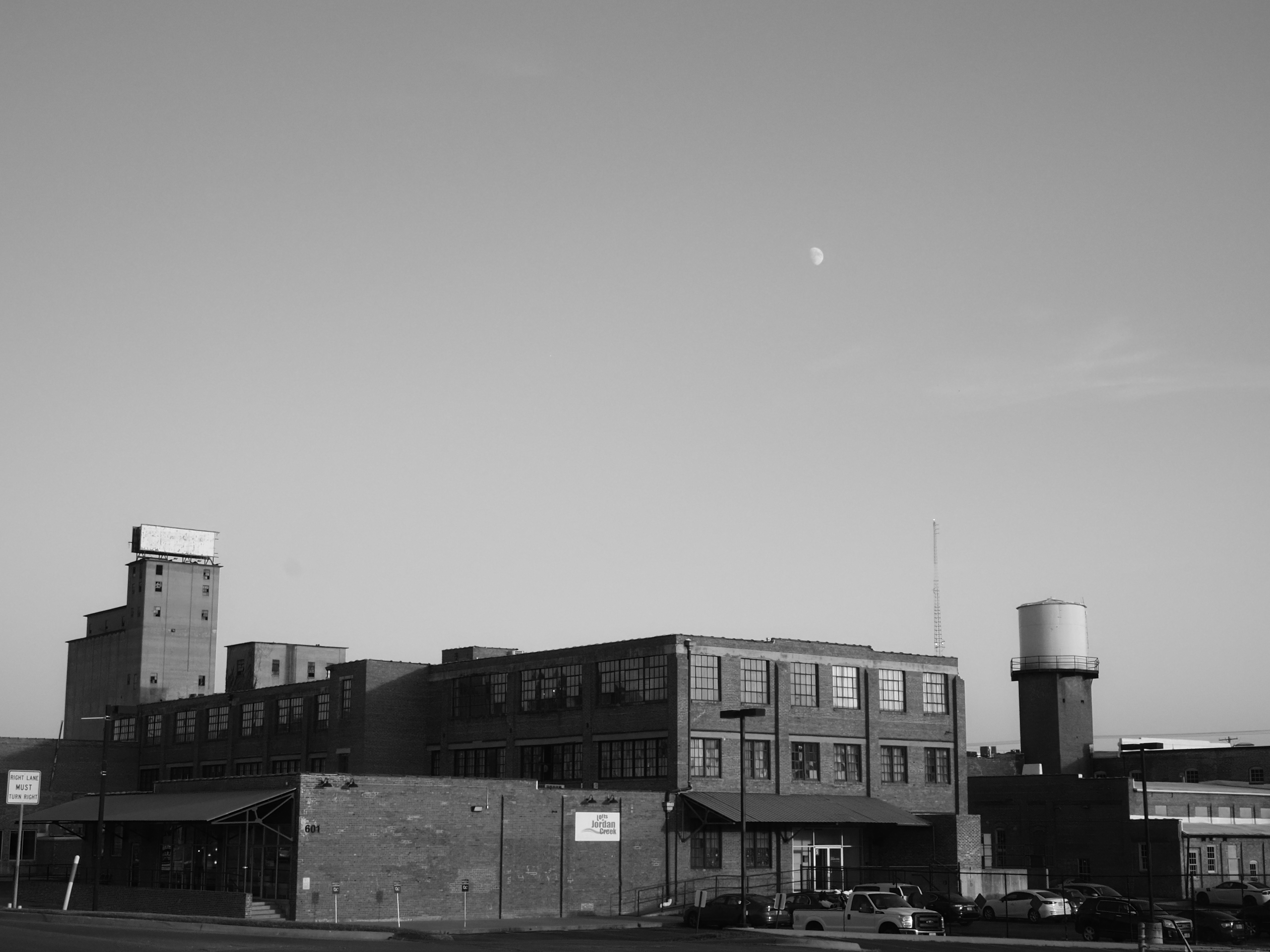
- Springfield Furniture Company in 2024

- Location within Missouri Location within the United States
- Location: 601 N. National; Springfield, Missouri
- Coordinates: 37°12′58″N 93°16′35″W
- Area: 4.3 acres (1.7 ha)
- Built: c. 1895, c. 1904, c. 1913
- Architectural style: Warehouse/Industrial
- MPS: Springfield MPS
- NRHP reference No.: 06000536
- Added to NRHP: July 5, 2006

Springfield Furniture Company, also known as the General Warehouse Corp., is a historic manufacturing complex located at Springfield, Greene County, Missouri. The original sections were built about 1895, and expanded through 1933. The complex consists of two large brick factory buildings with brick walls, flat roofs, and little architectural detailing.

It was listed on the National Register of Historic Places in 2006.
