= Peiraiki-Patraiki =

Peiraiki-Patraiki (Greek: Πειραϊκή-Πατραϊκή) was one of Greece's largest industrial groups in the 20th century. It was the country's largest textile producer, and its annual production was said to be able to cover the Hellenic coastline twice over. The company was created in 1919, and operated until 1996.

== Early years ==
In 1919, Stamoulis Stratos and Christophoros Catsambas founded the Patras Trade-Industrial Company ("Patraiki"), producing stockings. In 1924 the firm purchased its first petroleum-powered machine, replacing the steam-powered machines it used to that time. During the same year, the company went public (being the first public company in Patras), raising capital in order to found a cotton-processing plant. Over the next few years, the company expanded by purchasing machinery from abroad.

== Peiraiki-Patraiki ==
In 1931 Catsambas was called to a meeting with the Governor of the National Bank of Greece, Ioannis Drosopoulos. The bank had given out large loans to Peiraiki, a company whose products closely related those of Patraiki. Peiraiki was by this time nearly bankrupt, trading at about 60 drachmas in the Athens Stock Exchange, whereas to acquire the loans it had used shares valued at 220 drachmas as collateral. Drosopoulos was thus eager to save the firm so that the bank could collect the debt in the future. For this reason, he suggested to Catsambas that a joint venture be formed between the two firms, and that Catsambas should take over the management of Peiraiki. However Catsambas noted that in this case, a conflict of interest would arise, as he and Stratos were the principal shareholders of Patraiki. He counter-proposed that the two firms be merged, with him as Managing Director, so that the conflict would be avoided. Drosopoulos initially rejected this proposal, only to accept it two months later. At that time Catsambas also asked for a loan of 5,000,000 drachmas, which Drosopoulos accepted. Thus, Peiraiki-Patraiki was formed.

== Peiraiki-Patraiki during and after World War II ==
During the war, Peiraiki-Patraiki provided the Greek Army with goods such as blankets and fabrics for uniforms. During 1941 the company donated its entire profits to the government, and used its raw materials (cotton) to support its workers. After the war ended, raw materials were scarce, but the firm tried to regroup and install new plants, with a view to exports. In 1950 the firm began constructing the Megalo Pefko plant, the first factory to be built in Greece after the war. T. H. Robsjohn-Gibbings worked as an external designer for the company.

== Modernization ==
By 1953 the Greek market was flooded with foreign imports, while the firm's pre-war plants were old and inefficient (with the exception of the post-war Megalo Pefko factory). Catsambas and Stratos decided to build a state-of-the-art factory in Patras. They secured financing from the Export-Import Bank of the United States, and constructed the new plant.

Over the next decades, Peiraiki-Patraiki expanded by acquiring other plants and through joint ventures.

== Late years ==
By the 1960s, the company owned and operated nine factories in Greece, Germany and Sudan. It was at the time Greece's largest private employer. However, in the 1970s the company faced many problems, due to the global oil crisis, unrest and strikes by the labor force and difficult relations between the owners and the Greek government. In the early 1980s, the new socialist government of Andreas Papandreou nationalized the company, kicking out the Stratos family and appointing a new management. An ambitious effort was then made to restore the company's prestige, but after the fall of Papandreou in 1989, the new government of Constantine Mitsotakis decided to privatize the company, facing strong opposition from the workforce; by 1993 Peiraiki-Patraiki had almost stopped functioning, and officially it closed down in 1996.
