= T. H. Robsjohn-Gibbings =

British furniture designer (1903–1976)

- Born: Terence Harold Robsjohn-Gibbings c. 1903–1909; Widnes, Cheshire, England
- Died: 1976; Athens, Greece
- Citizenship: American
- Notable work: Casa Encantada
- Style: Art Deco, Greco-Roman
- Partner: Carlton Pullin
- Patrons: Aristotle Onassis

T. H. Robsjohn-Gibbings (1903–1976) was a British-born architect and furniture designer.

== Life ==
Harry was born in Widnes, Lancashire (now part of Cheshire), on April 8, 1903 (School admission form and Naturalisation papers) and named Thomas Harry Robjohns Gibbings. He was the 7th children of William and Miriam Gibbings and attended Hale Church of England Elementary School and Widnes Municipal Secondary School leaving at the age of 17. There is no evidence of him attending higher education although many sources claim he studied at London and Liverpool University. He was definitely living at the family home in Liverpool from Autumn 1928 until he sailed to the US in November 1929 and again in 1930, when he took up residence in New York. He applied to be a naturalised American citizen in 1940.

It is suggested that he worked briefly in the 1920s as a naval architect, designing ocean liner interiors, and then as art director for a motion picture studio. In 1926, he may have become a salesman for an antiques dealer who specialized in Elizabethan and Jacobean furniture, and Robsjohn-Gibbings was assigned prominent accounts such as Elizabeth Arden and Neiman Marcus.

In the late 1930s and 1940s he was the most important decorator in America. After opening a shop on New York's Madison Avenue in 1936, Robsjohn-Gibbings proceeded to design houses from coast to coast for such scions as tobacco heiress Doris Duke, publisher Alfred A. Knopf, and socialite Thelma Chrysler Foy.

The design work of T. H. Robsjohn Gibbings is hallmarked as a modern mixture of the classical elements of Ancient Grecian design, and Art Deco design. It features mosaic floor reproductions, sculptural fragments, and sparse furnishings, all combining to achieve his trademark brand of modern historicism.

He disliked the prevailing tastes of the day, describing them as "an indigestible mixture of Queen Anne, Georgian and Spanish styles." He likewise considered Bauhaus-style modernism a fraud; he expressed his views in his writings such as Goodbye, Mr. Chippendale (1944), a spoof of modern interior design, Mona Lisa's Mustache: A dissection of Modern Art (1947), and Homes of the Brave (1953).

One of the designer's most important residential commissions was Hilda Boldt Weber's mansion Casa Encantada in Bel-Air. Creating more than 200 pieces of furniture for the house between 1934 and 1938, Robsjohn-Gibbings indulged his passion for Greco-Roman design by incorporating sphinxes, dolphins, lions' paw feet, and Ionic columns in table bases, torchères, and select pieces of furniture, nonetheless keeping the interior design simple and elegant. Casa Encantada survived and was sold intact to Conrad Hilton in 1952 and similarly sold on to its next owner, David H. Murdock. He retained some of what was called the "opulent simplicity", but sold off the contents in the early 1980s. The architect might have appreciated the irony that, although the fine fittings and structure remained virtually untouched, these rooms made the perfect background for the new owner's fine collection of eighteenth century English furniture. It has since been sold again.

T. H. Robsjohn-Gibbings much preferred the visual vocabulary of the classical world, particularly ancient Greek furniture and design. Robsjohn-Gibbings' look was widely emulated, and, from 1943 to 1956, he worked as a designer for the Widdicomb Furniture Company in Grand Rapids, Michigan.

In 1960, he met Greek cabinetmakers Susan and Eleftherios Saridis, and, together, they created the Klismos line of furniture, which drew heavily on classical forms, including the namesake klismos chair. It is still in production. Robsjohn-Gibbings eventually moved to Athens, where he became designer to Aristotle Onassis. He died there in 1976, ending a 34-year relationship with his partner, Carlton Pullin, whom he had met in New York.

His honors include the 1950 Waters Award and the 1962 Elsie de Wolfe Award.

His furniture has been collectible for the past decade and particularly those pieces he had designed for the Casa Encantada, which are fetching high prices in auctions. His work has been studied by Daniella Ohad Smith, who has delivered a paper in the annual conference of the Interior Design Educator Council in 2008 and has published an article on his concepts in shaping the modern American home.

== Quotations ==
"The surroundings householders crave are glorified autobiographies ghostwritten by willing architects and interior designers who, like their clients, want to show off."

— "Robsjohn-Gibbings Names the Biggest Bore" Town & Country Jan 81

"If Thomas Jefferson visited your home, he would judge your furniture for its utility not for its antique charm."

— "If Thomas Jefferson Visited Your Home" American Home Volume: 32 1944

"The rich are always with us, so we should learn to enjoy them."

== Sources ==
- LostCityArts "T. H. Robsjohn Gibbings"
- cDecor "An American in Paris"
