= Lorenzo Marsili =

Italian philosopher and activist (born 1984)

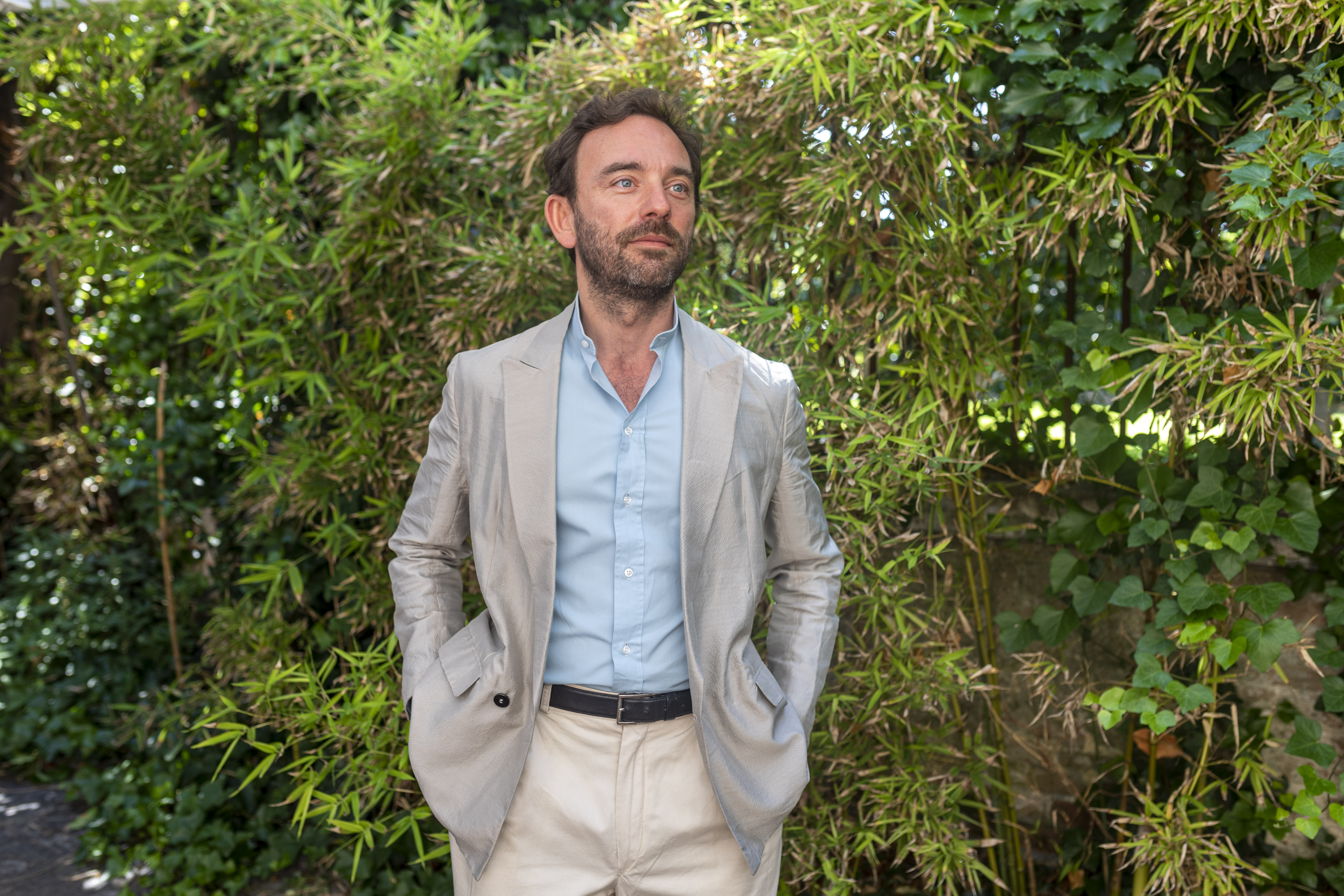
- Marsili in 2023
- Born: Lorenzo Marsili; 1984 (age 41–42); Rome, Italy
- Education: University of London (BA, MPhil)

Lorenzo Marsili (born 1984) is an Italian philosopher, political activist, and social entrepreneur.

== Life and career ==
Marsili was born in Rome, Italy. At 21, after graduating in philosophy from the University of London, he established the Postanalytic Group in protest against the hegemony of analytical philosophy in the UK. Soon after he founded the quarterly cultural review Naked Punch together with contributors such as Noam Chomsky, Gayatry Spivak and Jacques Ranciere.

After spending time in China and obtaining a second degree from the School of Oriental and African Studies he launched Transnational Dialogues, an exchange program between Chinese and European artists and activists. In 2007, on the 50th anniversary of the Treaties of Rome, he established pan-European network European Alternatives, developing it into an international NGO with offices in London, Berlin, Paris and Rome. He established Transeuropa Festival and was the artistic director of the first four editions.

In 2013 he launched the European Media Initiative, gathering 200,000 signatures to demand an EU directive on media freedom.

In 2016, he became one of the initiators of the pan-European movement DiEM25, together with Yanis Varoufakis.

In 2020, he established the cultural institution Fondazione Studio Rizoma, which in 2026 started running the Teatro Garibaldi in Palermo, Italy.

In 2023 he became the founding director of the Berggruen Institute Europe Center, headquartered at Casa dei Tre Oci in Venice, Italy.

He writes for various European newspapers, including The Guardian, Il Sole 24 Ore, El Diario, Al Jazeera, Il manifesto, Il Fatto Quotidiano, Huffington Post, and OpenDemocracy. Marsili appears as a guest on Italian national TV (Rai3 and La7), Al Jazeera and was host of TalkReal, a nomadic Europe-wide talk show.

== Thought and Political views ==
In his books, Marsili often combines metaphysical and political preoccupations, while an eclectic style making ample use of Chinese philosophy an non-Western sources. This approached is synthesised in his concept of ontopoiesis, denoting the construction of reality through action, as made manifest in his book Concrete Universality: Philosophy for an Age of Fragmentation. His preoccupation with the question of universality stems from a rejection of both top-down homogeneity and the fragmentation of the world into separate civilisational spheres. This line of research, exposed in Concrete Universality, is also at the heart of a project run with Hans Ulrich Obrist and which culminated in the book What is Universalism? New Philosophy for a Multipolar World.

Marsili is a staunch advocate of transnationalism and of the construction of a new cultural and political vision beyond the nation state. In his books Il Terzo Spazio and Citizens of Nowhere he responds directly to the crisis of the European Union and the rise of the nationalist right by proposing a third way between the maintaining the status quo and accepting the demise of the European project. Marsili has argued that "the nation-state is not the solution, but part of the problem", while strongly criticising the existing structures of the European Union. He has been defined as "the Italian response to the euro-sceptics", and is an outspoken advocate of the need for pan-European political parties. In a booklet written together with Niccolò Milanese, he has argued for the need of a pan-European constituent process to draft new Treaties for the European Union. In his books Planetary Politics and La tua patria è il mondo intero (Your motherland is the entire world), he outlines a comprehensive transnational vision merging European cosmopolitanism with Chinese thought. In the light of the COVID-19 pandemic in May 2020, Marsili called for a "European republic of equals" where every citizen could enjoy the same social protections, benefit from the same economic support and pay the same taxes.

== Bibliography ==
In English

- Towards a transnational democracy in Europe (with Niccolò Milanese), European Alternatives, 2015
- Citizens of Nowhere, Zed Books, 2018 (ISBN 978-1786993694)
- Planetary Politics, Polity Press, 2020 (ISBN 978-1509544776)
- What is Universalism? New Philosophy for a Multipolar World (with Hans Ulrich Obrist), Berggruen Press, 2026 (ISBN 979-8-9914102-5-0)
- Concrete Universality: Philosophy for an age of fragmentation, Polity Press, 2027 (ISBN 978-1-5095-7623-4)

In Italian

- Il terzo spazio (with Yanis Varoufakis), Laterza, 2017 (ISBN 978-8858128282)
- La tua patria è il mondo intero, Laterza, 2019 (ISBN 978-8858138649)

In German

- Wir heimatlosen Weltbürger, Suhrkamp Verlag, 2018 (ISBN 978-3- 518-12736-0)

In Spanish

- Tu patria es el mundo entero, Herder editorial, 2021 (ISBN 978-84-254-4538-5)

In Greek

- Πανυφηλια πολιτικη, Topovoros, 2021 (ISBN 978-618-5771-10-2)
