= Kristin Ross =

American literary theorist

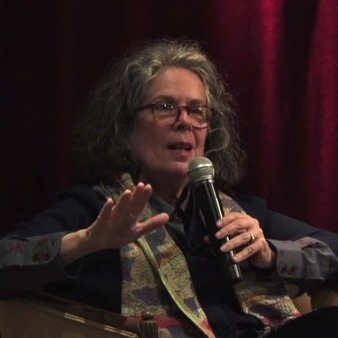
- Born: 1953 (age 72–73)

Academic background
- Education: Yale University (Ph.D., 1981)

Academic work
- Discipline: Comparative literature, urban theory
- School or tradition: Continental philosophy

Kristin Ross (born 1953) is an American literary theorist who is professor emeritus of comparative literature at New York University. She is primarily known for her work on French literature and culture of the 19th and 20th centuries.

== Life and work ==
Ross received her Ph.D. from Yale University in 1981. She has written a number of books, including The Emergence of Social Space: Rimbaud and the Paris Commune (1988); Fast Cars, Clean Bodies: Decolonization and the Reordering of French Culture (1995); and May '68 and its Afterlives (2002). She edited Anti-Americanism (2004) with Andrew Ross (no relation). In 2015, her book Communal Luxury: The Political Imaginary of the Paris Commune was published.

For Fast Cars, Clean Bodies, Ross was awarded the Laurence Wylie Prize in French Cultural Studies. Ross has also received a Guggenheim Fellowship and a fellowship from the Institute for Advanced Study in Princeton, New Jersey.

Ross has also translated several works from French, including Jacques Rancière's The Ignorant Schoolmaster. Along with her research interests in French political culture and literature, Ross's work has focused on urban history, theory, politics, ideology, and popular culture.

== Selected bibliography ==
- (co-editor, with Alice Kaplan). Everyday Life, Yale French Studies, no. 73. Fall 1987. ISBN 9780300040470
- The Emergence of Social Space: Rimbaud and the Paris Commune. University of Minnesota Press. 1988. ISBN 9780816616862
  - French translation, Les Prairies Ordinaires, 2012.
- Fast Cars, Clean Bodies: Decolonization and the Reordering of French Culture. MIT Press. 1995. ISBN 9780262181617
  - French translation, Groupe Flammarion, 2006.
- May '68 and Its Afterlives. University of Chicago Press. 2002. ISBN 9780226727974
  - French translation, Le Monde Diplomatique/Complexe, 2005.
- (co-editor, with Andrew Ross). Anti-Americanism. New York University Press, 2004. ISBN 9780814775677
- "Democracy for Sale" in Democracy in What State?. Columbia University Press, 2011. ISBN 9780231152983
- Communal Luxury: The Political Imaginary of the Paris Commune. Verso Books, 2015. ISBN 9781781688397
  - French edition, La Fabrique, 2015.
- (translator and writer of preface). The Zad and NoTAV: Territorial Struggles and the Making of a New Political Intelligence. Verso Books, 2018. Translation of the Mauvaise Troupe's Contrées. ISBN 978-1-78663-496-2
- The Commune Form:The Transformation of Everyday Life. Verso Books, 2024. ISBN 9781804295311
