= Kharnang Monastery =

Tibetan Buddhist monastery in Sichuan, China

Kharnang monastery
- Location within Sichuan

Religion
- Affiliation: Tibetan Buddhism

Location
- Location: Lhobasha, Garzê Tibetan Autonomous Prefecture, Sichuan, China
- Country: China
- Interactive map of Kharnang monastery
- Coordinates: 32°58′18″N 100°04′41″E

Kharnang Monastery (Tibetan: མཁར་ནང, Wylie: mkhar nang) is a Buddhist monastery situated at a close distance to the northwest of Lhobasha village which is to the east and at 4-hours drive by horse to the city of Karze (Garzê) in the Garzê Tibetan Autonomous Prefecture of Sichuan, China, located in the historical Tibetan region of Kham.

== History ==
The monastery comprised 450 monks including lamas in the 1950.

In 1955, persecutions by the Chinese authorities started in Kharnang monastery, leading some monks to commit suicide rather than break their vow of celibacy.

In the spring of 1956, the lands and herds belonging to the monastery were seized during the first of the democratic reforms. Consequently, the monks were forced to work in the fields.

In 1979, Adhe Tapontsang, a former Tibetan prisoner released in 1985 and now living in exile in Dharamsala, was allowed to visit her native place for two weeks. She discovered that the Kharnang monastery, as well as Karze Day-tshal monastery and De Gonpo Temple was completely destroyed and plundered, sometime during the Cultural Revolution.

In 1981, the re-institution of the monastery was authorised by the government.
