= Gabriel Rockhill =

Marxist philosopher, writer, and activist (born 1972)

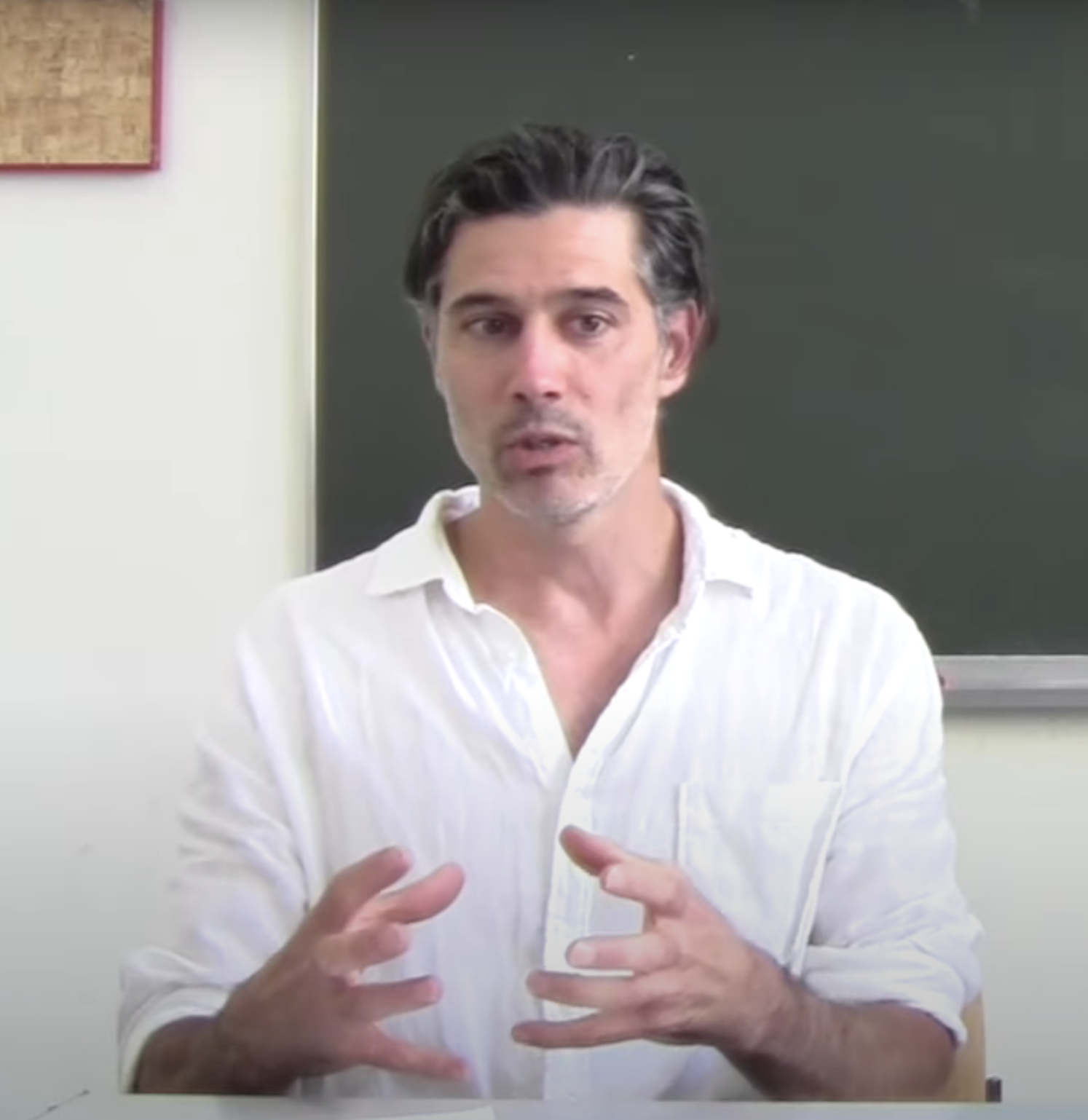
- Rockhill in Paris, 2017
- Born: 1972 (age 53–54)
- Occupation: Philosopher

Academic background
- Education: Grinnell College; School for Advanced Studies in the Social Sciences; Paris 8 University; Emory University
- Thesis: Logique de l'histoire: la pensée contemporaine aux prises avec le passé (2005)
- Doctoral advisor: Alain Badiou
- Other advisor: Jacques Derrida

Academic work
- Institutions: Villanova University
- Website: gabrielrockhill.com

Gabriel Rockhill (born 1972) is an American philosopher, writer, and cultural critic. He is Professor of Philosophy & Global Interdisciplinary Studies, Director of Cultural Studies, and Director of the Critical Theory Workshop at Villanova University, as well as former program director at the Collège International de Philosophie.

Best known for his work in the fields of history, aesthetics, and politics. His writings have circulated in venues such as CounterPunch, Black Agenda Report, The New York Times, Libération, and the Los Angeles Review of Books.

== Early life and education ==
Rockhill grew up on a small farm in Kansas. His father was a builder, and a university level professor of architecture who owned a small design firm. His parents were political liberals who opposed the Vietnam War. As a youth, Rockhill did manual labor on a farm and in construction on some of his father's projects, but he describes his family's class standing as "petty-bourgeois."

As an undergraduate Rockhill attended Grinnell College in Iowa, graduating in 1995. He then moved to Paris to study philosophy. He earned a master's degree from the School for Advanced Studies in the Social Sciences under the direction of Jacques Derrida and Luce Irigaray. He then earned a Ph.D. from Paris 8 University under the direction of Alain Badiou, where Étienne Balibar led the committee for his dissertation evaluation. Rockhill also holds a Ph.D. in philosophy from Emory University.

== Work ==
=== Books ===
Rather than understanding politics and art as two separate spheres, he demonstrates through historical materialist analysis that they are not fixed categories with a singular relation, but rather social practices and "concepts in struggle." In books like Radical History & the Politics of Art and Interventions in Contemporary Thought, he proposes a departure from extant philosophical debates on what is commonly called "art" and "politics" in the name of a historical analysis of the political dimensions inherent in the production, circulation, and reception of aesthetic practices. Engaging with an array of intellectual, artistic, and political traditions, his work maps interactions between aspects of aesthetic and political practices as they intertwine and sometimes merge in fields of struggle.

In his earlier work, Logique de l'histoire, he developed an alternative logic of history that emphasizes the geographic and social dimensions of history, as well as a novel account of social practices and a multidimensional theory of agency. Another book, Contre-histoire du temps présent, expands this work to a critical analysis of the dominant image of the present moment, dismantling what he refers to as the "historical and political imaginary of the contemporary conjuncture."

=== Critical Theory Workshop ===
Since 2008, Rockhill has directed the Critical Theory Workshop / Atelier de Théorie Critique in Paris. Originally conceived as a study abroad program for Villanova University, it currently operates as an independent nonprofit that hosts an annual Summer School at the School for Advanced Studies in the Social Sciences.

=== Critical theory and the Cold War ===
In addition to his scholarly publications, Rockhill has written a number of essays of political critiques that tie the United States' Central Intelligence Agency and other Western capitalist nation-states' security apparatuses to the anti-communist politics of Western intellectual thought as seen in the Frankfurt School, Michel Foucault, Slavoj Žižek, and others. These online articles for left literary publications have been subject to debate and have been translated into multiple languages.

== Selected bibliography ==
=== Books ===
==== Sole-authored books ====
- Logique de l’histoire: Pour une analytique des pratiques philosophiques (Paris: Editions Hermann, 2010), ISBN 978-2-7056-6965-2.
- Radical History & the Politics of Art (New York: Columbia University Press, 2014), ISBN 978-0-231-15201-3.
- Interventions in Contemporary Thought: History, Politics, Aesthetics (Edinburgh University Press, 2016).
- Contre-histoire du temps présent: interrogations intempestives sur la mondialisation, la technologie, la démocratie (CNRS Éditions, 2017), published in English as Counter-History of the Present: Untimely Interrogations into Globalization, Technology, Democracy (Duke University Press, 2017).
- Requiem pour la French Theory (Éditions Delga, 2024), published in English with Aymeric Monville as Requiem for French Theory (Monthly Review Press, 2026)
- Who Paid the Pipers of Western Marxism? (Monthly Review Press, 2025).

==== Edited books ====
- With Pierre-Antoine Chardel: Technologies de contrôle dans la mondialisation: enjeux politiques, éthiques et esthétiques (Paris: Editions Kimé, 2009), 207 pp. ISBN 978-2-84174-499-2. (pb.)
- With Philip Watts: Jacques Rancière: History, Politics, Aesthetics (Durham, North Carolina: Duke University Press, 2009), 368 pp. ISBN 978-0-8223-4506-0. (pb.)
- With Alfredo Gomez-Muller, in collaboration with Seyla Benhabib, Nancy Fraser, Judith Butler, Immanuel Wallerstein, Cornel West, Will Kymlicka, Michael Sandel and Axel Honneth: Politics of Culture and the Spirit of Critique: Dialogues (New York: Columbia University Press, Series "New Directions in Critical Theory," 2011), 240 pp. ISBN 978-0-231-15187-0. (pb.)
  - French edition (slightly different): Critique et subversion dans la pensée contemporaine américaine: Dialogues (Paris: Editions du Félin, 2010).
  - Spanish edition (slightly different): La teoría crítica en Norteamérica: Política, ética y actualidad (Medellín: La Carreta Editores, 2008).

==== Edited translations ====
- Jacques Rancière. The Politics of Aesthetics (London: Continuum Books, 2004).
- With John V. Garner: Cornelius Castoriadis. Postscript on Insignificance: Dialogues with Cornelius Castoriadis (London: Continuum Books, 2011).
- Domenico Losurdo. Western Marxism: How it was Born, How it Died, How it can be Reborn (Monthly Review Press, 2024)

=== Articles ===
- "Opinion | Why We Never Die". The New York Times. 29 August 2016.
- "Opinion | Unraveling Love Stories". The New York Times. 13 February 2017.
- "The CIA Reads French Theory: On the Intellectual Labor of Dismantling the Cultural Left," The Philosophical Salon, February 28, 2017.
- Who’s Afraid of Direct Action on Campus? Mobilizing Pedagogy Against the Powerful, Truthout, August 23, 2017.
- "Foucault, Genealogy, Counter-History". Theory & Event. 23 (1): 85–119. January 2020. doi:10.1353/tae.2020.0004. S2CID 214117570. Project MUSE 747096.
- "Foucault: The Faux Radical,"The Philosophical Salon, October 12, 2020.
- "Foucault, Anti-Communism & the Global Theory Industry: A Reply to Critics," The Philosophical Salon, February 1, 2021.
- "The CIA & The Frankfurt School's Anti-Communism,"The Philosophical Salon, June 27, 2022.
- "Capitalism’s Court Jester: Slavoj Žižek," CounterPunch, January 3, 2023.
