= Sangmai =

- Town

Tibetan transcription(s)

Chinese transcription(s)
- Country: China
- Province: Sichuan
- Prefecture: Garzê Tibetan Autonomous Prefecture
- Time zone: UTC+8 (CST)

Nyimilungba (Tibetan: ཉི་མའི་ལུང་པ་གྲོང་རྡལ།, Wylie: nyi mavi lung pa grong rdal; Chinese: 太阳谷镇; pinyin: Tàiyánggǔ Zhèn), formerly Sangmai (Chinese: 松麦镇), is a town in the Garzê Tibetan Autonomous Prefecture of Sichuan, China.
