= Joseph Jacotot =

French teacher and educational philosopher (1770–1840)

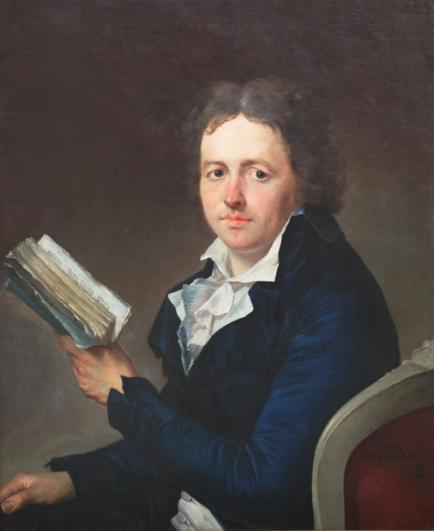
- Born: Jean Joseph Jacotot; 4 March 1770; Dijon, France
- Died: 30 July 1840 (aged 70); Paris, France
- Occupations: Educationist, teacher
- Known for: The method of intellectual emancipation

Jean Joseph Jacotot (English: /ʒɑːkoʊˈtoʊ/ zhah-koh-TOH, French: [ʒɑ̃ ʒozɛf ʒakɔto]; 4 March 1770 – 30 July 1840) was a French teacher and educational philosopher, creator of the method of "intellectual emancipation."

== Life ==
Jacotot was born at Dijon on 4 March 1770. He was educated at the university of Dijon, where in his nineteenth year he was made a professor of Latin, after which he studied law, became a lawyer, and at the same time devoted a large amount of his attention to mathematics.

In 1788 he organized a federation of the youth of Dijon for the defence of the principles of the Revolution; and in 1792, with the rank of captain, he set out to take part in the campaign of Belgium, where he conducted himself with bravery and distinction. After filling the office of secretary of the commission d'organisation du mouvement des armées, in 1794 he became deputy of the director of the École Polytechnique. Upon the founding of the central schools at Dijon he was appointed to the chair of the "method" or instruction of science. There he made his first experiments in his "emancipatory" method of teaching. When the central schools were replaced by other educational institutions, Jacotot occupied the chairs of mathematics and of Roman law until the overthrow of the empire. In 1815 he was elected a representative to the chamber of deputies; but after the Second Restoration he found it necessary to quit his native land.

Having taken up his residence at Brussels, in 1818 Jacotot was nominated teacher of the French language at the University of Louvain, where he systematized the educational principles which he had already practised successfully in France.

== Teaching method ==
His emancipatory or panecastic (French: panécastique "everything in each" from Greek πᾶν and ἕκαστον) method was not only adopted in several institutions in Belgium, but also met with some approval in France, England, Germany, and Russia. It was based on three principles:

1. all men have equal intelligence;
2. every man has received from God the faculty of being able to instruct himself;
3. everything is in everything.

Regarding the first principle, he maintained that it is only in the will to use their intelligence that men differ. His own process, depending on the third principle, was to give a student learning a language for the first time a short passage of a few lines, and to encourage the pupil to study first the words, then the letters, then the grammar, then the meaning, until a single paragraph became the occasion for learning an entire literature. A book that he often used as a source material for learning was Les Aventures de Télémaque. After the revolution of 1830 Jacotot returned to France, and he died in Paris on 30 July 1840.

Jacotot described his system in Enseignement universel (universal education), langue maternelle (Louvain and Dijon, 1823)—which passed through several editions—and in various other works; and he also advocated his views in the Journal de l'émancipation intellectuelle and elsewhere. For a complete list of his works and fuller details regarding his career, see Biographie de J. Jacotot, by Achille Guillard (Paris, 1860).

Jacotot's educational doctrines became popular in England through the interest taken by British educationalist Joseph Payne in a study of his work, called A Compendious Exposition of the Principles and Practice of Professor Jacotot's Celebrated System of Education (1830).

Jacotot's career and principles are also described by Jacques Rancière in The Ignorant Schoolmaster: Five Lessons in Intellectual Emancipation (Stanford University Press, 1991).

== Publications ==
- Enseignement universel, Langue maternelle (1823)
- Musique, dessin et peinture (1824)
- Mathématiques (1827)
- Langues étrangères (1828)
- Droit et philosophie panécastiques (1837)
