= Jean-Marie Raoul =

French lawyer and musician

Jean-Marie Raoul (1766–1837) was a French crown lawyer and Justice at the Paris Cour de Cassation, as well as a musician and an enthusiastic friend of art. He cultivated the violoncello, on which he distinguished himself. He was the author of a violoncello school, which appeared under the title of Méthode de violoncelle, contenant une nouvelle exposition des principes de cet instrument. Raoul composed also some sonatas and "Airs variés" for his favorite instrument. However, his efforts, supported by Jean-Baptiste Vuillaume, the well-known Parisian luthier, to restore the gamba to practical use were in vain.

== Biography ==
Raoul was born in Paris, in 1766. His sister, Fanny Raoul, was a feminist writer, journalist, philosopher and essayist, and his brother, Jean-Anne Christy de la Pallière, rose to contre-amiral in the French Navy.

His official position was crown lawyer (avocat á la cour de cassation) and, later, as Justice at the Paris Cour de Cassation.

He wrote a tutorial (Op. 4), Méthode de violoncelle, contenant une nouvelle exposition des principles de cet instrument, à ceux de l'étude de la double corde. He composed also three sonatas (Paris, Pleyel) and airs variés for his instrument. Interesting were his endeavours to reinstate the viol da gamba, which he played himself. He was in possession of the famous gamba, by Gasparo Duiffopruggar, made in 1521 for Francis I. The back of the instrument showed a bird's eye view of Paris, inlaid in coloured wood. After Raoul's death, the instrument passed into the hands of Vuillaume, to form one of the greatest acquisitions of the museum of the Royal Conservatory of Brussels. Dr. Jean-Paul-Henry Coutagne, whose friends heard the instrument played by Raoul, described its sound as one of penetrating sweetness (une douceur penetrante de ces sons). Raoul conceived the idea of having a gamba made which should come nearer the violoncello in proportion, and Vuillaume made one on a new model in 1827, exhibited in the same year as the "Heptachord". (Note: See notice by R. in the "Revue Musicale," Volume II, page 56, also “Annales de la litterature et des arts," 335 livre, tome 28.) The popular verdict was, however, not in favour of this revival of the gamba, which had not been heard of again until the early 20th century, when several musicians showed a renewed interest in historical instruments.

Raoul died in Paris, 1837.
