= Adhe Tapontsang =

Tibetan refugee (1932–2020)

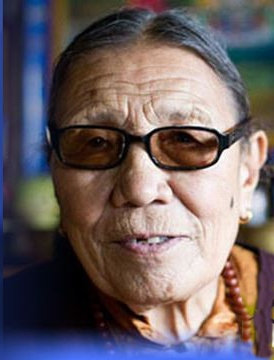
- Adhe Tapontsang
- Born: 1932; Ghortsa, Xinlong County, Tibet
- Died: 3 August 2020 (aged 87–88); Dharamshala, India
- Occupation: Resistant

Adhe Tapontsang (1932 – 3 August 2020) was a Tibetan resistance fighter of the Chushi Gangdruk. She spent 27 years in the Laogai before taking refuge in India.

== Biography ==
Tapontsang was born into a nomadic family in Eastern Tibet. Shortly after she was married, the Battle of Chamdo took place. In 1954, her husband poisoned himself as she was pregnant and with a one-year-old child. [[her book says: "No one witnessed the poisoning of his food, but everyone suspected the Chinese had planted someone to commit this act."]]

She joined the Chushi Gangdruk of the Khampas shortly thereafter.

In 1958, Tapontsang was arrested and separated from her two children. She was subject to interrogation and internment in the Laogai for 27 years, eleven of them as a "free laborer". She was released in 1985.

In 1987, Tapontsang fled Tibet for Nepal and eventually settled in India. In order to leave China, she had to swear she would tell no one of what she experienced during her internment. However, she denounced the Chinese government upon her arrival and spoke out against the torture of families and the inaction on the 1960 famine in Tibet. She devoted herself to creating artwork in memory of those who died in the Chinese camps.

In 1999, Tapontsang was invited to France by the Groupe d'information internationale sur le Tibet to speak before the Senate. There, she met Lionel Jospin, Jack Lang, Danielle Mitterrand, Françoise Hostalier, Catherine Trautmann, and Nicole Péry. She attended a socialist women's conference at the Maison de la Mutualité, where she also met Geneviève Fraisse.

Adhe Tapontsang died on 3 August 2020 in Dharamshala, India.

== Distinctions ==
- 100 Heroines Award (1999)

== Autobiographies ==
- The Voice That Remembers: A Tibetan Woman's Inspiring Story of Survival, Adhe Tapontsang as told to Joy Blakeslee, foreword by the 14th Dalai Lama, Wisdom Publications, Boston, MA, 1997, ISBN 0861711300, 9780861711307
- Ann Riquier, Voices of Tibetan Women, foreword by the 14th Dalai Lama, translation by C. Dickson, Welcome Rain Publishers, 2000, ISBN 1566491584, 9781566491587
