= European Alternatives =

Non-profit civil society organisation

European Alternatives (also known as EA or Euroalter) is a non-profit civil society organisation promoting democracy, equality and culture beyond the nation-state. The mission of the organisation is to promote a more democratic, equal and culturally open Europe. It does it by providing participatory spaces, helping to develop alternative means of political, social, and cultural participation and by connecting local activists and organisations spread around Europe.

== Origins ==
The organisation was established in London by Lorenzo Marsili and Niccolò Milanese as a nonprofit company under UK law in February 2007 and was launched with the organisation of the London Festival of Europe in March 2007, marking the 50th anniversary of the Treaties of Rome. The opening lecture was given by Polish sociologist Zygmunt Bauman and main partners included the London School of Economics, Tate Modern, and Courtauld Institute of Arts.

Today, the organisation has offices in Paris, Berlin and Rome and organises activities across the EU, Ukraine and Turkey.

== Mission and values ==
The organisation aims to promote the emergence of a transnational political space empowering citizens, civil society and social movements to act at the European level and reclaim their democratic agency over EU policies. European Alternatives presents itself as an infrastructure empowering members, partners, and organisations across Europe to upscale and connect their work for greater influence and impact. The organisation also promotes the emergence of real transnational parties in Europe.

The organisation favours greater democratic political integration in the European Union, but is critical of the status quo, claiming that "the current European regime is undermining its own claims to universal rights, democracy and justice." Its motto is "Democracy, Equality, Culture Beyond the Nation-State”.

== Structure ==
The movement is overseen by a Board of Trustees and an Advisory Board.

=== Members of the Board of Trustees ===
- Ami Weickaane
- Luke Cooper
- Lucie Matting
- Louna Sbou
- Jotham Sietsma
- Jelena Vasiljević
- Niccolò Milanese
- Ovidiu Ţichindeleanu
- Rasha Shaaban
- Lorenzo Marsili
- Ségolène Pruvot

=== Members of the Advisory Board ===
- Philippe Van Parijs
- Etienne Balibar
- Raffaella Bollini
- Tania Bruguera
- Engin Isin
- Sandro Mezzadra
- Gianluca Solera
- Sigrid Gareis
- Wang Hui

== Members and network ==
European Alternatives benefits from a transnational community of supporters throughout Europe. Membership is open to all who share EA's objectives and is free of charge.

== Main activities ==
=== Projects ===
==== Transeuropa Festival ====
Transeuropa Festival was established in 2007 in London as ‘London Festival of Europe’, holding its first Transeuropa Festival in 2010. Transeuropa Festival was a transnational festival of culture, arts and politics, taking place in different cities all over Europe (initially in sync and distributed, but later centered at specific location). Director of European Alternatives invites in 2015 participation to the Belgrade event, as organization operates both inside and outside the current European Union. Through a series of linked practices, events and discourses it produces a shared and collaborative space to develop transnational projects tackling politics.

==== Campus of European Alternatives ====
The general objectives of the Campus are to find the best paths to combat to rise of extreme right in Europe and to share and exchange practices to create transnational movements.

==== Citizens Rights ====
The Citi-Rights project examines how, when and where people in the EU can individually and collectively protect and advance rights and, where they are limited from exercising their rights, how transnational collaboration can imagine and build a future where rights are actively protected. The project is in partnership with eleven organisations across Europe and has several components: researching citizen rights in the EU, providing trainings for civil-society activists to improve their capacity to protect and extend rights, teaching about rights in schools and universities and drafting EU policy proposals.

==== Talk Real ====
Talk Real is a nomadic political talk show for the web and new media format piloted since Summer 2015. The talkshow provides a space for discussions that explore topics in depth telling the stories of different social movements across Europe. Talk Real works as an informal audiovisual platform for the dissemination of ideas and the organisations and individuals behind them.

=== Campaigns ===
==== Media Freedom Campaign ====
In 2014 European Alternatives ran a European Citizens Initiative (ECI) on media freedom, collecting 200,000 signatures across the EU to demand better European policy to protect freedom of information. The ECI is a new tool of participatory democracy introduced from April 2012 by the Lisbon Treaty, which allows civil society coalitions to collect signatures online and offline to present directly to the European Commission a proposal forming the base of an EU Directive.

== Awards and honours ==
In 2008 European Alternatives won a prize from the Charlemagne Foundation and the European Parliament for the London Festival of Europe.

In 2011 European Alternatives won the civil society prize from the European Economic and Social Committee.

European Alternatives is certified the B!ngo certificate and B-Star Label by the Brussels interns’ organisation B!ingo for the quality of the internship offered (Quality Early Job Experience).

== Controversy ==
The organisation was attacked by the UK Daily Mail. Niccolò Milanese responded to the accusations in The Guardian.
