= Tsemkhog =

- Town

Tibetan transcription(s)

Chinese transcription(s)
- Country: China
- Province: Sichuan
- Prefecture: Garzê Tibetan Autonomous Prefecture
- Time zone: UTC+8 (CST)

Tsemkhog is a town in the Garzê Tibetan Autonomous Prefecture of Sichuan, China.
