= The Ignorant Schoolmaster =

1987 book by Jacques Rancière

- First edition (French)
- Author: Jacques Rancière
- Original title: Le Maître ignorant
- Translator: Kristin Ross
- Subject: Philosophy, education
- Published: 1987, Fayard
- English publication date: 1991
- Pages: 148 (English)

The Ignorant Schoolmaster: Five Lessons in Intellectual Emancipation is a 1987 book by philosopher Jacques Rancière on the role of the teacher and individual towards individual liberation. Rancière uses the example of Joseph Jacotot, a French teacher in the late 18th century who taught in Belgium without knowledge of their language (Flemish), to explain the role of liberation after Marxism. The work expresses Rousseauist ideas, e.g. in the state of nature humans are morally good, and emphasizes that individual change precipitates societal change. Its arguments draw heavily from the French socialist party's debates on education during the 1980s. It was translated to English in 1991 by Kristin Ross.

== Writing style ==
Rancière's philosophy informs his writing style. Rancière tells the story of 18th century French teacher Joseph Jacotot without explicit commentary. Translator Kristin Ross sees the book as uniting Rancière's archival-narrative and polemical styles (xxiii). She considers that the book may be a satirical polemic against modern sociology, targeting specifically the sociologists Pierre Bourdieu, Rancière's teacher Louis Althusser, and Jean-Claude Milner (xxiii). The book is a historical moment intervening politically in the present; this is effected by Rancière blurring his voice with that of Jacotot (xxi-ii). Rancière's choice to write the book as a story reflects his rejection of explication, teaching and writing which presumes an intellectual inequality between the writer and reader (xxii). Translator Kristen Ross writes: "The very act of storytelling, an act that presumes in its interlocutor an equality of intelligence rather than an inequality of knowledge, posits equality, just as the act of explication posits inequality" (xxii). The book is equally relevant to history as to philosophy of education; in the U.S. Rancière is best known among historians (xxi).

== Main concepts ==
Stultifying master vs. emancipatory master

The explicator, "having thrown a veil of ignorance over everything that is to be learned, he appoints himself to the task of lifting it" (6-7). Only by concealing knowledge from the student is the explicator able to teach it. This makes the student dependent on the master. Rancière also calls this "Enforced stultification" (7). The emancipatory master, on the other hand, teaches students only that he has nothing to teach them. This emancipates students from their dependence on explicators. However, this does not mean no master is necessary (12). What is emancipation? "We will call the known and maintained difference of the two relations-- the act of an intelligence obeying only itself even while the will obeys another will-- emancipation" (13). In other words, the student's intelligence is not reliant on the master's, but the master's will strengthens the student's will, the student's self-confidence, to learn independently. "To emancipate an ignorant person, one must be, and one need only be, emancipated oneself, that is to say, conscious of the true power of the human mind" (15).

Learned master vs. ignorant (school) master

"It goes without saying that a scientist might do science without explicating it. But how can we admit that an ignorant person might induce science in another?" (14). While exiled in Belgium, the French-speaking Jacotot taught Flemish-speaking students about the Télémaque using a bilingual French-Flemish translation (1-2). His students learned to intelligently read and write about the Télémaque in French, despite having no prior French instruction (2). Later, Jacotot taught other subjects that he didn't know anything about, including painting and the piano (15).

The circle of power

A circle of powerlessness ties the student to the explicator of the old method (15). "The circle of power, on the other hand, can only take effect by being made public" (15). To break the circle of powerlessness, Rancière argues that "the circle of emancipation must be begun" (16). This, for Rancière, calls for a return to original "universal teaching," meaning learning something without any means of having it explained. "In reality, universal teaching has existed since the beginning of the world, alongside all the explicative methods. This teaching, by oneself, has, in reality, been what has formed all great men" (16).

Universal teaching

Jacotot's method "was not a method for instructing the people; it was a benefit to be announced to the poor; they could do everything any man could. It sufficed only to announce it" (18). Thus, for Rancière, emancipation becomes a political act of affirming and awakening the equal intelligence of all people. He writes: "All men have equal intelligence" (18)

== Reception ==
A review in French Studies wrote that the book would have a small audience outside France due to the specificity of its themes, the resurgence of right-wing politics, and growing unemployment in which few would have the leisure to pursue the inward dialogue Rancière recommends.

== Bibliography ==
- Bowman, Paul (November 16, 2016). "The Intimate Schoolmaster and the Ignorant Sifu: Poststructuralism, Bruce Lee, and the Ignorance of Everyday Radical Pedagogy". Philosophy and Rhetoric. 49 (4): 549–570. doi:10.5325/philrhet.49.4.0549. ISSN 1527-2079. S2CID 152151734 – via Project MUSE.
- Brockliss, L.W.B. (January 1994). "The Ignorant Schoolmaster: Five Lessons in Intellectual Emancipation". French Studies. 48 (1): 104–105. doi:10.1093/fs/XLVIII.1.104. ISSN 0016-1128.
- Davis, O. (April 1, 2010). "The Radical Pedagogies of Francois Bon and Jacques Ranciere". French Studies. 64 (2): 178–191. doi:10.1093/fs/knq001. ISSN 0016-1128.
- Ewalt, Joshua P. (February 11, 2016). "Rhetoric, Poetics, and Jacques Rancière's The Ignorant Schoolmaster: Five Lessons in Intellectual Emancipation". Philosophy and Rhetoric. 49 (1): 26–48. doi:10.5325/philrhet.49.1.0026. ISSN 1527-2079. S2CID 147678631 – via Project MUSE.
- Hirschhorn, Thomas (March 1, 2007). "Eternal Flame". Artforum International.
- Lang, Candace (October 1992). "Rev. of The Ignorant Schoolmaster: Five Lessons in Intellectual Emancipation". Canadian Philosophical Reviews. 12 (5): 344–347. ISSN 0228-491X.
- Morlock, Forbes (1997). "The Story of the Ignorant Schoolmaster". Oxford Literary Review. 19 (1/2): 105–132. doi:10.3366/olr.1997.005. ISSN 0305-1498. JSTOR 44122460.
- Rancière, Jacques; Guenoun, Solange; Kavanagh, James H.; Lapidus, Roxanne (April 1, 2000). "Jacques Ranciere: Literature, Politics, Aesthetics: Approaches to Democratic Disagreement". SubStance. 29 (2): 3–24. doi:10.1353/sub.2000.0022. ISSN 1527-2095. S2CID 142492585.
- Ross, Kristin (March 1, 2007). "Kristin Ross on Jacques Ranciere". Artforum International.
