= Nights of Labor =

Nights of Labor: The Workers Dream in Nineteenth Century France
- 2012 Verso edition
- Author: Jacques Rancière
- Cover artist: Van Gogh; Starry Night Over the Rhône - 1888
- Language: French
- Publisher: Fayard (1981, French); Temple University Press (1989); Verso (2012)
- Media type: Print
- Pages: 448 pp
- ISBN: 1844677788 (re-release)

Nights of Labor: The Workers Dream in Nineteenth Century France (La Nuit des prolétaires: Archives du rêve ouvrier) is a 1981 non-fiction book by Jacques Rancière, which was based upon his doctoral thesis. The book was re-released in 2012 by Verso under the title Proletarian Nights.

== Synopsis ==
The book collects a series of paraphrasing, quotations and summaries of worker writings that discuss a series of three experiments in worker association in mid-19th-century Paris. In the book Rancière looks at the beginnings of today's socialism and early proletarian class consciousness.

== Reception ==
Labour/Le Travail praised the book, calling it "an important statement". The American Historical Review wrote that the translation of the book was "excellent" and thought the foreword by Donald Reid was a highlight. The Oral History Review stated that Nights of Labor was "a powerful, piercing, and radical argument". The Journal of Modern History stated the book was "more a work of philosophical meditation than conventional historical analysis." Spiked Magazine praised Rancière for not taking a "hero-centric view of history" but stated that the book was "a very dense text as Rancière, seemingly unwilling to interpret or even distil the great wealth of evidence he has uncovered, gives us it all".
