= Transeuropa Festival =

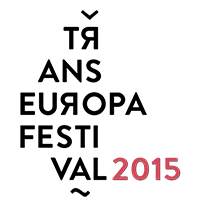
- Genre: Arts, culture and politics
- Frequency: Biennial
- Location: European cities
- Inaugurated: 2010
- Website: transeuropafestival.eu

The Transeuropa Festival is a bi-annual festival of culture, arts and politics held in different European cities since 2010. It includes discussions, presentations and workshops concerning transnational issues.

== Organisation ==
European Alternatives, which organises the festival, describes itself as "a transnational civil society organisation and citizens’ movement promoting democracy, equality and culture beyond the nation state." It arranges public events that include the annual Transeuropa Festival. European Alternatives also sponsors research, projects, campaigns and publications. The organisation was launched in London in 2007, on the occasion of the 50th Anniversary of the Treaty of Rome, by Lorenzo Marsili and Niccolo Milanese. The festival is supported by the Erste Stiftung, Charles Stewart Mott Foundation, Allianz Kulturstiftung, European Cultural Foundation and the Europe for Citizens Programme of the European Union.

== Events ==
The festival was launched in 2010 following the success of the Festival of Europe, which ran annually from 2007 to 2009. By 2011 over fifty activists, writers, intellectuals and artists were involved in the Transeurope Network, learning from previous festivals to plan the next. The 2011 festival was held in May in Amsterdam, Berlin, Bologna, Bratislava, Cardiff, Cluj-Napoca, Edinburgh, London, Lublin, Paris, Prague and Sofia. The main topics discussed included the rights of migrants, Roma integration, freedom of the press and a more just economy in the post-crisis era. That year the Danube Foundation arranged a lecture in Amsterdam on positive populism by Jan ter Burg and Eefje Blankevoort. In Prague, discussion topics included "Deconstructing the Migration Experience in Central Europe"; "Citizenship 'Lite.' " and "Enacting European Citizenship to Guarantee Roma Rights."

The third Transeuropa Festival was held in May 2012 over a two-week period. Events were arranged in Amsterdam, Barcelona, Belgrade, Berlin, Bologna, Bratislava, Cluj-Napoca, London, Lublin, Paris, Prague, Rome, Sofia and Warsaw. Topics included economic instability, migration experiences, and new forms of democratic participation. In London the events included "The Hidden Tales of London", a theatrical monologue and talk, "Seeds of Democracy: Europe and the Balkans", a talk by academics, politicians and activists and talks on "The UK in Europe's Economy and Europe's Economy in the World". In Prague there was a screening of short Arab art movies. Five artists from China took part in the art exchange in Rome and Bologna. The festival closed with a European Forum in Rome attended by representatives from all the cities of the Festival.

The 2013 festival was put back to the month of October. It was arranged by over 200 volunteers and activists in 13 European cities, and included performances, video screenings, forums and discussions. Events were held in the same cities as in 2012 apart from Rome. The final festival forum was scheduled for Berlin.

The 2015 festival took place across Europe in September, culminating in Belgrade 1–5 October. A transnational reading of Hannah Arendt’s ‘The Origins of Totalitarianism’ will be staged in support of Cuban artist and activist, Tania Bruguera.

The 2017 festival took place in Madrid in October.

The 2019 festival took place in Palermo in November.
