= Fanny Raoul =

French feminist writer, journalist, philosopher and essayist

- Born: Marie-Françoise Raoul; December 19, 1771; Saint-Pol-de-Léon, France
- Died: December 9, 1833 (aged 61); Paris, France
- Resting place: Montparnasse Cemetery
- Occupations: feminist writer; journalist; philosopher; essayist
- Relatives: Jean-Marie Raoul (brother); Jean-Anne Christy de la Pallière (brother-in-law)
- Writing career
- Notable work: Opinion d'une femme sur les femmes

Marie-Françoise Raoul, known as Fanny Raoul (born in Saint-Pol-de-Léon on December 19, 1771, and died in Paris on December 9, 1833) was a French feminist writer, journalist, philosopher and essayist.

== Early life and education ==
Little is known about the life of Marie-Françoise (nickname, "Fanny") Raoul. The editor of Raoul's essay, Opinion d'une femme sur les femmes as well as the record of the Bibliothèque nationale de France indicate 1771 as the year of her birth, while the biographical dictionary of Joseph-Marie Quérard, La France littéraire, ou Dictionnaire bibliographique des savants, historiens, et gens de lettres de la France, &c. indicates 20 December 1779.

Her mother, daughter of the organist of Saint-Pol-de-Léon, died while giving birth to Fanny. Her father, Claude-René Raoul, was first a notary, then a prosecutor of the bishopric, the first alderman of Saint-Pol-de-Léon and finally, a commissioner of the court of Morlaix after the revolution. He gave his daughter a solid and open intellectual education, being her first reader and advisor.

Raoul moved to Paris where she frequented the salons of Thérésa Tallien, Juliette Récamier, and Germaine de Staël. Fanny probably met Constance de Salm in Paris.

== Career ==
=== 1801-12 ===
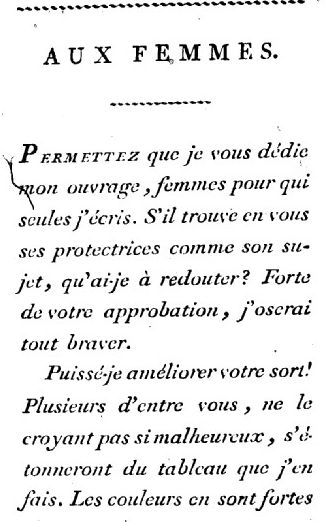
Opinion d'une femme sur les femmes, 1801

With the support of Constance de Salm, Raoul published Opinion d'une femme sur les femmes in 1801. Influenced by the thinking of Claude Adrien Helvétius, and citing Étienne Bonnot de Condillac, Raoul denounces the weight of opinion and prejudice. She pleads to obtain the full rights of a citizen and to work for more social justice. She fights with force the prejudices which oppress her sex. According to Briquet (1804), this work deserved to be better known; it was well written, the logic was pressing, and it contained healthy and new views. La Décade philosophique (The Décade philosophique, littéraire et politique) of her compatriot Pierre-Louis Ginguené praised the justness of Raoul's complaints6. This text was republished in 1989 at the initiative of Geneviève Fraisse (Côté-femmes éditions) and then in 2011, at "Le Passager clandestin", with a preface by Geneviève Fraisse and an article by Marie Desplechin. This text recalls the position of François Poullain de la Barre in his feminist writings, notably De l'égalité des deux sexes, written 150 years earlier. Raoul establishes the link between slavery of women and slavery of Blacks.

She then returned to Saint-Pol-de-Léon, but in 1813, she was back in Paris.

=== 1813 ===
In 1813, Raoul published Flaminie ou les erreurs d'une femme sensible, an epistolary novel. Here, she denounced again the injustice of prejudice and opinion contrary to reason in a world of classes and labels, through the story of her heroine, a woman who looks after the children of a good family and struggles to keep her independence.

Then followed in 1813 the Fragments philosophiques et littéraires, a collection of various texts that she had kept for years. This work was controversial: she accused Alexandre-Vincent Pineux Duval, member of the Académie Française and director of the Odéon-Théâtre de l'Europe, of plagiarism. She delivered a comparative study that was much debated and her fight was panned by journalists who nicknamed her the "Breton Amazon".

The same year, she published three other brochures in which she analyzed important political events. One finds in particular Idées d'une française sur la constitution faite ou à faire (Ideas of a Frenchwoman on the constitution made or to be made in) which she fears the return to an absolute monarchic system allowing that a class of citizens arrogates to itself the right to oppress all the others.

=== 1814-15 ===
De la charte constitutionnelle, 1814

From 1814 onwards, Raoul published a periodical which she called Le Véridique. The magazine was published until April 1815; 25 issues were published. Each number includes general information, political bills, art criticisms and a column on literature. From number 10 on, she signed each issue. Raoul is probably the only contributor. She relays the ideas of Benjamin Constant. Far from siding with economic liberalism, it is above all the social counterpart that finds favor in her eyes. She sees it as the surest and fairest way to make the greatest number of people benefit from the common good. All forms of oppression are now her battle ground, whether it is slavery, women, or poverty. She comments on current events, without forgetting to detail her troubles with the censors. The publication of Le Véridique ends with the appointment of Benjamin Constant to the Conseil d'État by Napoleon. Raoul is very enthusiastic about the advent of the idea of democracy that she has defended for years. She announces to retire from the public scene. She does not seem to write anymore afterwards despite the return to the monarchy in November 1815 and the exile of Benjamin Constant.

== Feminist commitment ==
Raoul defines herself as a woman of reason at war with the law of the strongest. She tirelessly demonstrated that women were quite capable of reasoning and of holding positions of high responsibility, provided they had access to education. Both men and women would benefit from equality in education and responsibility. She asserts that the inferior status offered to women is not natural. She demands women's independence, access to education, to all professions, to all functions. She is innovative; she has the admiration of Fortunée Briquet in her biographical dictionary. Raoul was at war with the legislators who sent women back to the private sphere where they suffered the tyranny of public opinion. After the revolutionary period, the social and political status of women was in regression.

Raoul did not question the notion of the complementarity of the two sexes. She considers that each sex has an equal responsibility in the creation of life. The law of the strongest -whether physically or economically- is contrary to a positive evolution of humanity. Likewise, everyone, from the weakest to the strongest, is equally responsible for the progression of society towards the common good. This humanistic objective of the social counterpart of liberalism defended by Raoul was, however, forgotten in favor of economic liberalism.

== Personal life ==
Raoul has two older sisters, Marie-Claude and Marianne-Jeanne. The latter married a former nobleman, Jean-Anne Christy de la Pallière, a naval officer. She died in Toulon where her husband was stationed. Marie-Claude married the military man Jean Lützenkirchen, in Saint-Pol-de-Léon. Jean-Marie Raoul, her elder brother, had a brilliant career at the parliament of Rennes, Lorient, and then in Paris where he was a lawyer at the Conseil d'État and at the Court of Cassation from 1792. This brother was also an amateur cellist known for his technical mastery. During his career as a magistrate in Paris, he met intellectuals from the world of music and also from the Freemasonry.

Raoul died in the former 12th arrondissement of Paris on December 9, 1833, at the age of 62, and she was buried two days later in the Montparnasse Cemetery.

== Publications ==
- Réflexions sur les brochures de MM. Bergasse et Grégoire (in French), Paris: s.n. (18..) – via BnF
- Opinion d'une femme sur les femmes (in French), Paris: impr. de Giguet, 1801 – via BnF. Republished in 2011 with a preface by Geneviève Fraisse.
- Flaminie ou les Erreurs d'une femme sensible (in French), Paris: Cussac, 1813 – via BnF
- De la Charte constitutionnelle par une Française (in French), Paris: s.n., 1814 – via BnF
- Du Principe et de l'obstination des Jacobins, en réponse au sénateur Grégoire (in French), Paris: s.n., 1814 – via BnF
- Idées d'une française sur la constitution faite ou à faire. Par l'auteur des Réflexions sur les brochures de MM. Bergasse et Grégoire (in French), Paris: impr. chez les libraires du Palais-Royal, 1814 – via BnF
- Le Véridique — No. 1-24 (in French), Paris: Delaunay Simon-César, Jean Charles, et chez Adrien-César Egron, 1815

== Bibliography ==
- Brunet, Christelle, "Fanny Raoul, écrivain et journaliste sous Napoléon et la première Restauration", Maîtrise d'histoire, Paris, Université Paris VIII, 2004. (in French)
- Fraisse, Geneviève, Muse de la raison, démocratie exclusive et différence des sexes, Paris, Folio-Gallimard, (1989) 1995. (in French)
