= Jean-Anne Christy de la Pallière =

Jean-Anne Christy-Pallière
- Born: Jean-Anne Christy de la Pallière; 18 September 1755; Dinan, Côtes-du-Nord
- Died: 29 July 1829 (aged 73); Toulon
- Relatives: Jean Baptiste Christy de La Pallière (father); Jean-Marie Raoul (brother-in-law); Fanny Raoul (sister-in-law)
- Military career
- Allegiance: France
- Branch: French Navy
- Service years: 1778–1816
- Rank: Contre-amiral
- Commands: Sans Pareil; Scévola; Dix-août; Convention; Tyrannicide (later renamed Desaix)
- Conflicts: American Revolutionary War; Battle of Ushant; French Revolutionary Wars; Bruix' expedition of 1799; Battle of Algeciras Bay; Napoleonic Wars
- Awards: Legion of Honour; Order of Saint Louis

Jean-Anne Christy de la Pallière, also written "Christy-Pallière", (French pronunciation: [ʒɑ̃ an kʁisti də la paljɛʁ]; 18 September 1755 – 29 July 1829) was a French Naval officer.

== Biography ==
Born in Dinan, Côtes-du-Nord, to Jean Baptiste Christy de La Pallière, a captain of the French East India Company, Christy-Pallière began his sailing career in 1773, as an apprentice on an East Indiaman. He was ensign in 1774 and voyaged to China and to India in 1776-1777.

On 8 May 1778, Christy-Pallière joined the French Royal Navy, serving as a Frigate Lieutenant aboard the frigate Surveillante and taking part in the Battle of Ushant.

In February 1779, he was promoted to Ensign, and appointed to the 64-gun Sévère, under his own father. La Pallière followed his father on the 74-gun Orient when he was promoted to that command. On Orient, he took part in the Battle of Sadras on 17 February 1782, in the Battle of Providien on 12 April 1782, in the Battle of Negapatam on 6 July 1782 and in the Battle of Trincomalee from 25 August to 3 September 1782. On 8 September 1782, Orient ran aground at Pointe de Sale, near Trincomalee, while La Pallière was on watch. She became a total loss. Ensign La Pallière consequently was dismissed from the Navy.

On 1 March 1793, Christy-Pallière was reinstated into the Navy and promoted to Captain. He took command of the Sans Pareil, and later of the Scévola. In January 1794, as a nobleman, Christy-Pallière was removed from duty, but reinstated in November. From the ship Dix-août, he commanded a frigate division, and later captained the ship Convention. In 1799, he was general adjutant of the Océan, supervising the general staff of Admiral Bruix during the expedition to the Mediterranean.

He then went on to command the 74-gun ship Tyrannicide, which was renamed Desaix in 1801. On 3 July 1801, Desaix captured HMS Speedy, captained by Lord Cochrane; brought aboard, Cochrane handed over his sword, which Christy-Pallière refused in recognition of Cochrane's achievements. Christy-Pallière took part in the ensuing Battle of Algeciras Bay.

In 1803, Christy-Pallière was put in charge of the military harbour of Brest. From 1805 to 1815, he commanded the harbour of Toulon. He also periodically relieved the préfet maritime, Jean-Marthe-Adrien l'Hermite, who was often too ill to serve.

Christy-Pallière was retired on 31 December 1815, was reinstated in March 1816, and retired again at the Bourbon Restoration in July 1816, with the honorary rank of contre-amiral.

He died in Toulon in 1829.

== Honours ==
- Officer of the Legion of Honour
- Knight of the Order of Saint Louis

== In popular culture ==
Christy-Pallière is a recurring character in the Aubrey-Maturin series by Patrick O'Brian. Some of the exploits of the hero of the books, Jack Aubrey, are closely modelled on Thomas Cochrane, 10th Earl of Dundonald in the first book Master and Commander and he encounters Christy-Pallière in similar circumstances when his ship, the Sophie is captured. Christy-Pallière appears again in later books in the series, posed as a royalist who puts his ship in service of the Royal Navy.
