= Béla Tarr, the Time After =

2011 nonfiction book by Jacques Rancière

- First edition (French)
- Author: Jacques Rancière
- Language: French
- Publisher: Capricci
- Publication date: 2011
- English publication date: 2013 (publ. Univocal)
- Media type: Print
- Pages: 81 pp
- ISBN: 978-1937561154

Béla Tarr, the Time After (Béla Tarr, le temps d'après) is a 2011 non-fiction book by Jacques Rancière about the films of Béla Tarr.
