= Jacques Rancière =

French philosopher

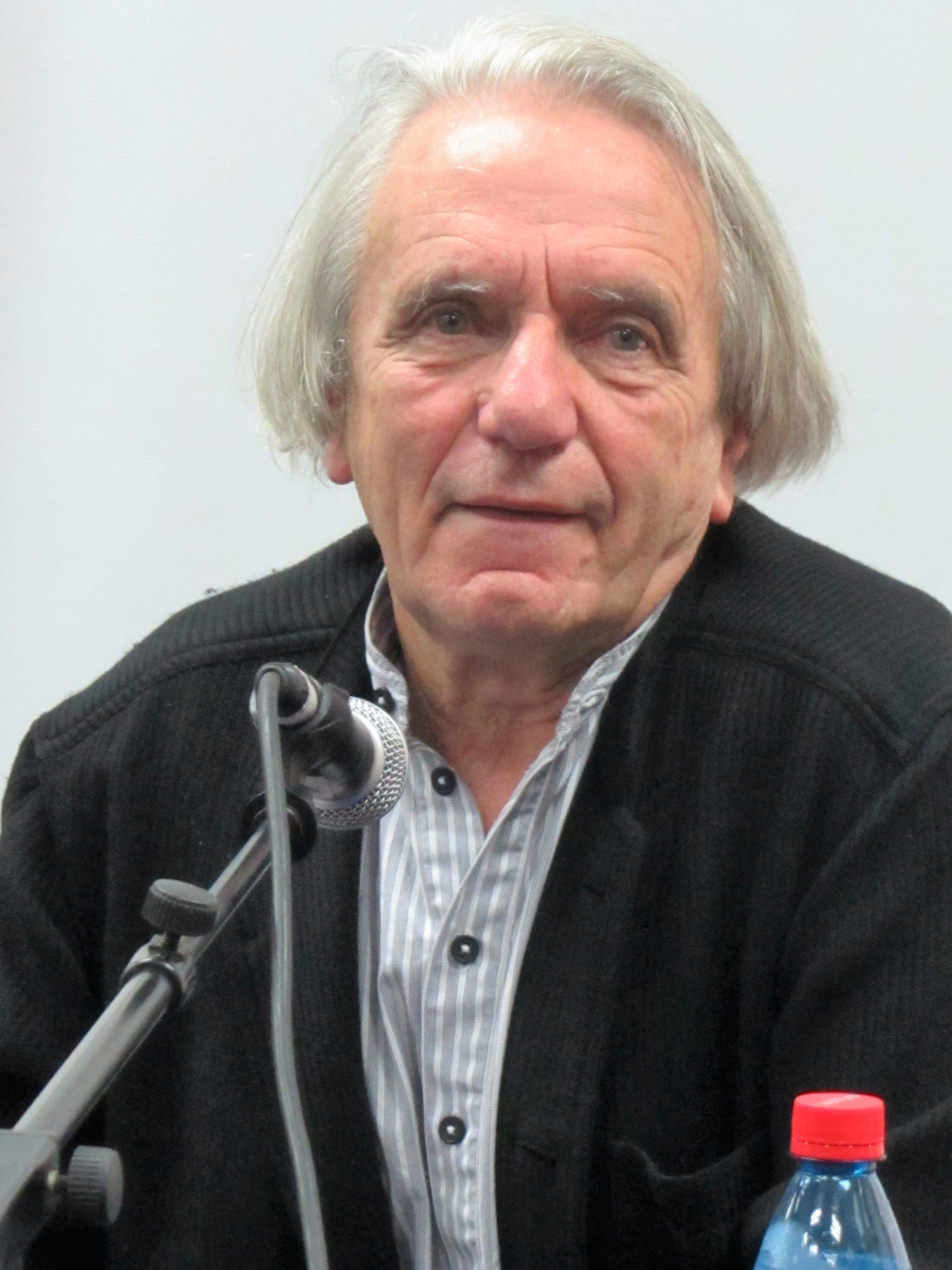
- Rancière in 2016
- Born: 10 June 1940 (age 86); Algiers, French Algeria (now Algeria)
- Political party: GP (1968–72)

Education
- Education: École Normale Supérieure
- Academic advisor: Louis Althusser

Philosophical work
- Era: 20th-/21st-century philosophy
- Region: Western philosophy
- School: Continental philosophy Structural Marxism (early); Maoism (early); Post-Marxism
- Institutions: University of Paris VIII
- Main interests: Political philosophy, aesthetics, philosophy of history, philosophy of education, cinema
- Notable ideas: The Visual, "part with no part"

Jacques Rancière (/ˌrɑːnsiˈɛər/ RAHN-see-AIR; French: [ʒɑk ʁɑ̃sjɛʁ]; born 10 June 1940) is a French philosopher, Professor of Philosophy at European Graduate School in Saas-Fee and Emeritus Professor of Philosophy at the University of Paris VIII: Vincennes—Saint-Denis. After co-authoring Reading Capital (1965) with the structuralist Marxist philosopher Louis Althusser and others, and after witnessing the 1968 political uprisings, his work turned against Althusserian Marxism. He later came to develop an original body of work focused on aesthetics.

== Life and work ==
Rancière contributed to the influential volume Reading Capital before publicly breaking with Althusser over his attitude toward the May 1968 student uprising in Paris; Rancière felt Althusser's theoretical stance did not leave enough room for spontaneous popular uprising.

Since then, Rancière departed from the path set by his teacher and published a series of works probing the concepts that make up the understanding of political discourse, such as ideology and proletariat. He sought to address whether the working class in fact exists, and how the masses of workers that thinkers like Althusser referred to continuously enter into a relationship with knowledge, particularly the limits of philosophers' knowledge with respect to the proletariat. An example of this line of thinking is Rancière's book entitled Le philosophe et ses pauvres (The Philosopher and His Poor, 1983), a book about the role of the poor in the intellectual lives of philosophers.

From 1975 to 1981, Rancière was a figurehead for the journal Les Révoltes logiques. Forming partly out of a philosophy seminar on workers' history that Rancière gave at Vincennes, it drew together philosophers and historians for a radical political intervention into French thought after the May 1968 uprisings. Its title acting as both a reference to Arthur Rimbaud's poem, "Democratie" (Nous massacrerons les révoltes logiques – "We'll smash all logical revolts") and the Maoist Cultural Revolutionary slogan adopted by the Gauche Prolétarienne group, of which some of Les Révoltes Logiques' members were active within, 'On a raison de se revolter' – 'It is right to revolt.', the journal attempted to interrogate and contest the historiographic and political norms around the representation of workers' and social history. Writing, along with feminist historian Geneviève Fraisse and others, Rancière attempted to reveal the complexity, contradictions and diversity of "thought and history from below". In its fifteen ordinary issues, the collective wished to overcome the historiographic norms in which the working class were given historical treatment but rendered voiceless, homogeneous and pre-theoretical; instead, they allowed workers to speak for themselves, and interrogated their words seriously.

More recently Rancière has written on the topic of human rights and specifically the role of international human rights organizations in asserting the authority to determine which groups of people, again the problem of masses, justify human rights interventions and even war.

== Political philosophy ==
Rancière's philosophy began as markedly radical, anti-elitist, and aggressively anti-authoritarian, with a focus on comparing and contrasting aesthetics and politics that developed later in his career. Gabriel Rockhill published an English glossary of Rancière's technical terms in 2004 as Appendix I to the English translation of Rancière's The Politics of Aesthetics with cross references to their explication in Rancière's major works. This glossary includes key terms in Rancière's philosophy that either he invented or uses in a radically different manner than their common usages elsewhere such as aesthetic regime, aesthetic unconscious, archi-politics, Community of Equals, demos, dissensus, distribution of the sensible, emancipation, the ethical regime of images, literarity, meta-politics, ochlos, para-politics, partition of the sensible, police order, the poetics of knowledge, post-democracy, regimes of art, silent speech, and le tort.

Rancière's political philosophy is characterized by a number of key concepts: politics, disagreement, police, equality, post-democracy:

- Politics — an activity the subject of which is equality.
- Disagreement — an insurmountable conflict between people, which is inherent in human nature and manifests itself in a speech situation when one of the interlocutors understands and does not understand the other at the same time.
- Police — a symbolic ordering of the social, aimed at determining the share of participation or lack of participation in each part. The concept goes back to the work of Michel Foucault in the 1970s.
- Equality — a set of practices aimed at certifying the equality of anyone with anyone.
- Post-democracy — consensus system of modernity based on the identity (full compliance) of society and the individual and the consideration of society as the sum of its parts.

=== The Ignorant Schoolmaster ===
Rancière's book, The Ignorant Schoolmaster: Five Lessons in Intellectual Emancipation (original title Le Maître ignorant: Cinq leçons sur l'émancipation intellectuelle, published in 1987) was written for educators and educators-to-be. Through the story of Joseph Jacotot, Rancière challenges his readers to consider equality as a starting point rather than a destination. In doing so, he asks educators to abandon the themes and rhetoric of cultural deficiency and salvation. Rather than requiring informed schoolmasters to guide students towards prescribed and alienating ends, Rancière argues that educators can channel the equal intelligence in all to facilitate their intellectual growth in virtually unlimited directions. The schoolmaster need not know anything (and may be ignorant). Rancière begins with the premises that all are of equal intelligence and that any collective educational exercise founded on this principle can provide the insights from which knowledge is constructed. He claims that the poor and disenfranchised should feel perfectly able to teach themselves whatever it is they want to know. Furthermore, anyone can lead, and the oppressed should not feel bound to experts or reliant on others for their intellectual emancipation. Jacotot advocated the 'equality of intelligence' and claimed that an ignorant person could teach another ignorant person. Rancière developed this idea in The Ignorant Schoolmaster, saying that “there is stultification whenever one intelligence is subordinated to another ... whoever teaches without emancipating stultifies”.

== Legacy ==
In 2006, it was reported that Rancière's aesthetic theory had become a point of reference in the visual arts, and Rancière has lectured at such art world events as the Frieze Art Fair.

Former French presidential candidate Ségolène Royal described Rancière as her favourite philosopher.

Rancière's writings have influenced developments in film theory, including historical and comparative approaches to representation, politics and spectatorship.

The literary critic Rita Felski has named Rancière as an important precursor to the project of postcritique within literary studies.

Among those intellectuals influenced by his work, Gabriel Rockhill, the editor and translator into English of Rancière's The Politics of Aesthetics, has developed a new paradigm for thinking about the historical relation between aesthetics and politics in close dialogue with Rancière's writings.

== Awards and recognition ==
Rancière was honored in 2023 by Les Rencontres Philosophiques de Monaco and the Prince Pierre Foundation, who presented him with the Prix de la Principauté for his lifetime of achievement and entire body of work.

== Selected bibliography ==
Rancière's work in English translation

- Reading Capital (1968) (with Louis Althusser, Roger Establet, Pierre Macherey and Étienne Balibar in the French original edition)
- “Reply to Levy”. Telos 33 (Fall 1977). New York: Telos Press.
- The Nights of Labor: The Workers' Dream in Nineteenth-Century France (1989) ISBN 0-87722-833-7.
- The Ignorant Schoolmaster: Five Lessons in Intellectual Emancipation (1987, tr. 1991) - ISBN 0-8047-1969-1.
- The Names of History: On the Poetics of Knowledge (1994) - This is a brief book, arguing for an epistemological critique of the methods and goals of the traditional study of history. It has been influential in the philosophy of history
- On the Shores of Politics (1995): ISBN 0-86091-637-5
- Disagreement: Politics and Philosophy (1998) ISBN 0-8166-2844-0.
- Short Voyages to the Land of the People (2003): ISBN 0-8047-3682-0
- The Politics of Aesthetics: The Distribution of the Sensible, ed. and transl. by Gabriel Rockhill (2004): ISBN 978-0-8264-8954-8
- The Philosopher and His Poor, ed. Andrew Parker, co-trans. John Drury, Corinne Oster, and Andrew Parker (2004): ISBN 978-0-8223-3274-9
- The Future of the Image (2007): ISBN 1-84467-107-0
- Hatred of Democracy (2007): ISBN 978-1-84467-098-7
- The Aesthetic Unconscious (2009), transl., Debra Keates & James Swenson: ISBN 978-0-7456-4644-2
- Aesthetics and its Discontents (2009), tr. by Steve Corcoran: ISBN 978-0-7456-4630-5
- The Emancipated Spectator (2010): ISBN 978-1-84467-343-8
- Dissensus: On Politics and Aesthetics (2010): ISBN 978-1-84706-445-5
- Chronicles of Consensual Times (2010), tr. by Steven Corcoran: ISBN 978-0-8264-4288-8
- The Politics of Literature (2011), tr. by Julie Rose: ISBN 978-0-7456-4531-5
- Staging the People: The Proletarian and His Double (2011), tr. by David Fernbach: ISBN 978-1-84467-697-2
- Althusser's Lesson (2011) - The first English translation of Rancière's first book, in which he explores and begins to move beyond the thought of his mentor, Louis Althusser (tr. by Emiliano Battista) ISBN 978-1-4411-0805-0
- Mute Speech: Literature, Critical Theory, and Politics (2011), tr. by James Swenson: ISBN 978-0-231-15103-0
- Mallarmé: The Politics of the Siren (2011), tr. by Steven Corcoran: ISBN 978-0-8264-3840-9
- Aisthesis: Scenes from the Aesthetic Regime of Art (2013), tr. by Zakir Paul: ISBN 978-1-78168-089-6
- Bela Tarr, the Time After (2013), tr. by Erik Beranek: ISBN 978-1937561154
- Figures of History (2014), tr. by Julie Rose: ISBN 978-0-7456-7956-3
- The Method of Equality (2016), tr. by Julie Rose: ISBN 978-0-7456-8062-0
- Modern Times (2017) : ISBN 978-953-7372-31-6 - 4 essays on temporality in art and politics, originally written in English
- "A coffee with Jacques Rancière Beneath the Acropolis" (2018), Babylonia
- The Edges of Fiction (2019), tr. by Steve Corcoran: ISBN 978-1-5095-3044-1
- Politics and Aesthetics, with Peter Engelmann (2019), tr. by Wieland Hoban: ISBN 978-1-5095-3502-6
- What Times Are We Living In? (2020), tr. by Steve Corcoran: ISBN 978-1-5095-3698-6
- The Time of the Landscape (2022), tr. by Emiliano Battista: ISBN 978-1-5095-4814-9
- Uncertain Times (2024), tr. by Andrew Brown: ISBN 978-1-5095-5867-4
- Rethinking Emancipation (2024), tr. by Andrew Brown: ISBN 978-1-5095-5922-0

Selected articles in English

- "Ten Theses on Politics", Theory & Event, 2001
- "Who Is the Subject of the Rights of Man?", The South Atlantic Quarterly, Volume 103, Number 2/3, Spring/Summer 2004, pp. 297–310
- "Is there a Deleuzian Aesthetics?", Tr. Radmila Djordjevic, Qui Parle?, Volume 14, Number 2, 2004, pp. 1–14
- "The Thread of the Novel", Novel: A Forum on Fiction, Volume 47, Number 2, 2014, pp. 196–209

== Films ==
- Marx Reloaded, Arte, April 2011.

== Video lectures ==
- Jacques Rancière. "What Makes Images Unacceptable?" on YouTube. Pacific Northwest College of Art. Portland, Oregon, February 29, 2008.
- Jacques Rancière. "Nights of Labour," on YouTube. Sarai Centre for the Centre for the Study of Developing Societies (CSDS). Video Lecture. February 6, 2009.
- Jacques Rancière. "Negation and Cinematic Vertigo." European Graduate School. Video Lecture. August 2009.
- Jacques Rancière. "The Edge of Fiction," on YouTube. Ohio State University. Video Lecture. September 21, 2017.

== Interviews ==
- "An Interview with Jacques Rancière: Playing Freely, from the Other, to the Letter" interviewed by Joseph R. Shafer, in SubStance, 2021.
- "Representation Against Democracy" Jacques Rancière on the French Presidential Elections, 2017
- "We Are Always Ignorant of our own Effects", Jacques Rancière interviewed by Pablo Bustinduy, in The Conversant, 2013
- "Democracy Means Equality", interview in Radical Philosophy
- Politics and Aesthetics, Jacques Ranciere interviewed by Peter Hallward, 2003
- Eurozine interview with Ranciere, 2006
- "Art Is Going Elsewhere. And Politics Has to Catch It", Jacques Rancière interviewed by Sudeep Dasgupta, 2008
- 'The Politics of Aesthetics': Jacques Rancière Interviewed by Nicolas Vieillescazes this interview piece was first posted: 12-01-09 at the website of Naked Punch
- Jacques Rancière interviewed by Rye Dag Holmboe for The White Review
- "Aesthetics against Incarnation: An Interview by Anne Marie Oliver," Critical Inquiry, 2008
- (in French) "Jean-Luc Godard, La religion de l'art. Entretien avec Jacques Rancière" paru dans CinémAction, « Où en est le God-Art ? », n° 109, 2003, pp. 106–112, reproduit sur le site d'analyse L'oBservatoire (simple appareil).
