= Naked Punch Review =

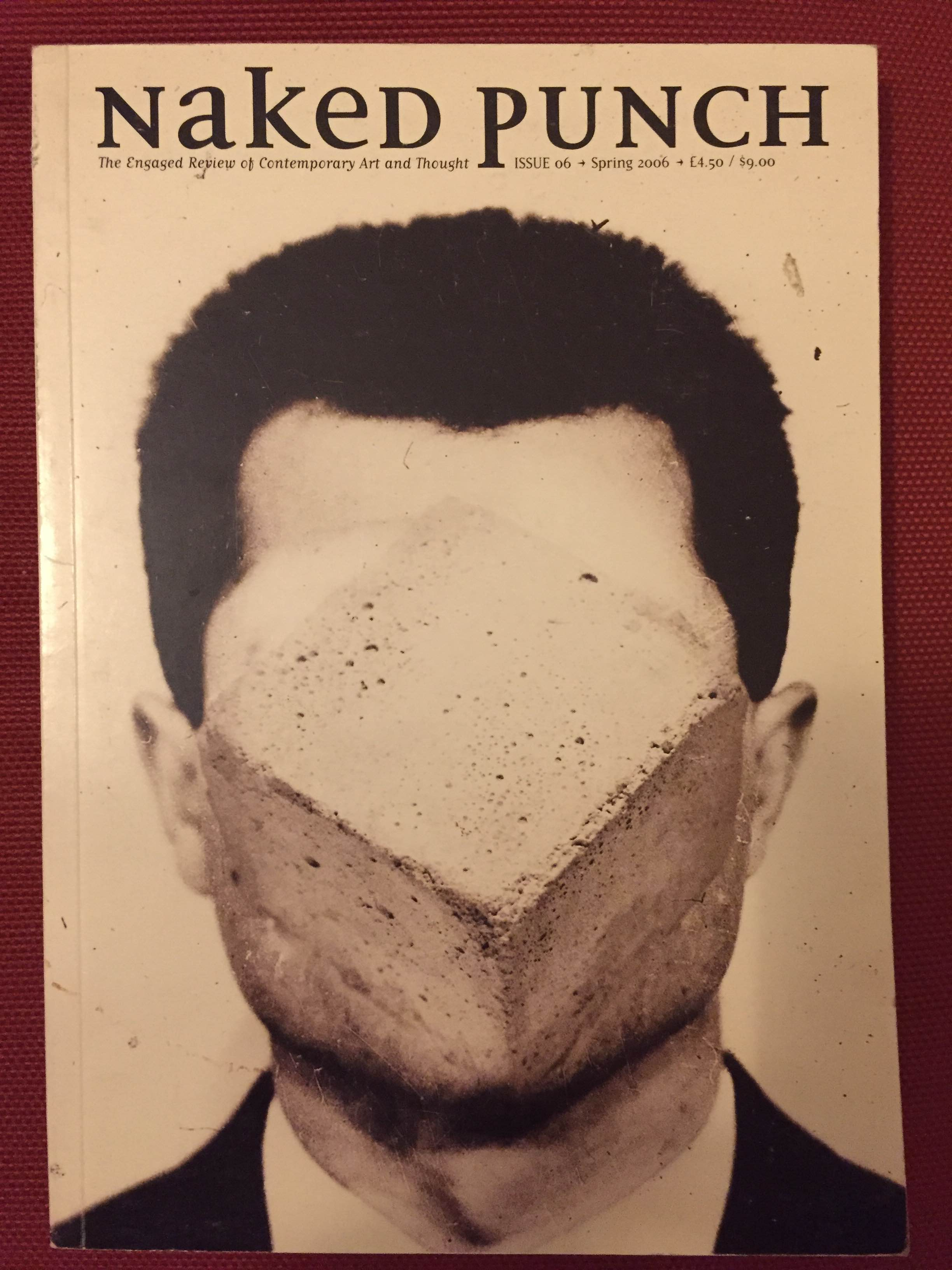
- Type: Journal
- Format: Magazine
- Editor: Lorenzo Marsili; Qalandar Memon; Jacopo Moroni
- Founded: 2002
- Political alignment: Marxist / Internationalist
- Headquarters: London, United Kingdom
- Website: http://www.nakedpunch.com/

Naked Punch Review is a quarterly interdisciplinary review and magazine of philosophy, art, politics and poetry.

The magazine was founded in 2002 by a collective of young London-based thinkers called the PostAnalytic group, now dissolved. The founding editors were Qalandar Bux Memon, Lorenzo Marsili and Jacopo Moroni.
