= Geneviève Fraisse =

French feminist philosopher (born 1948)

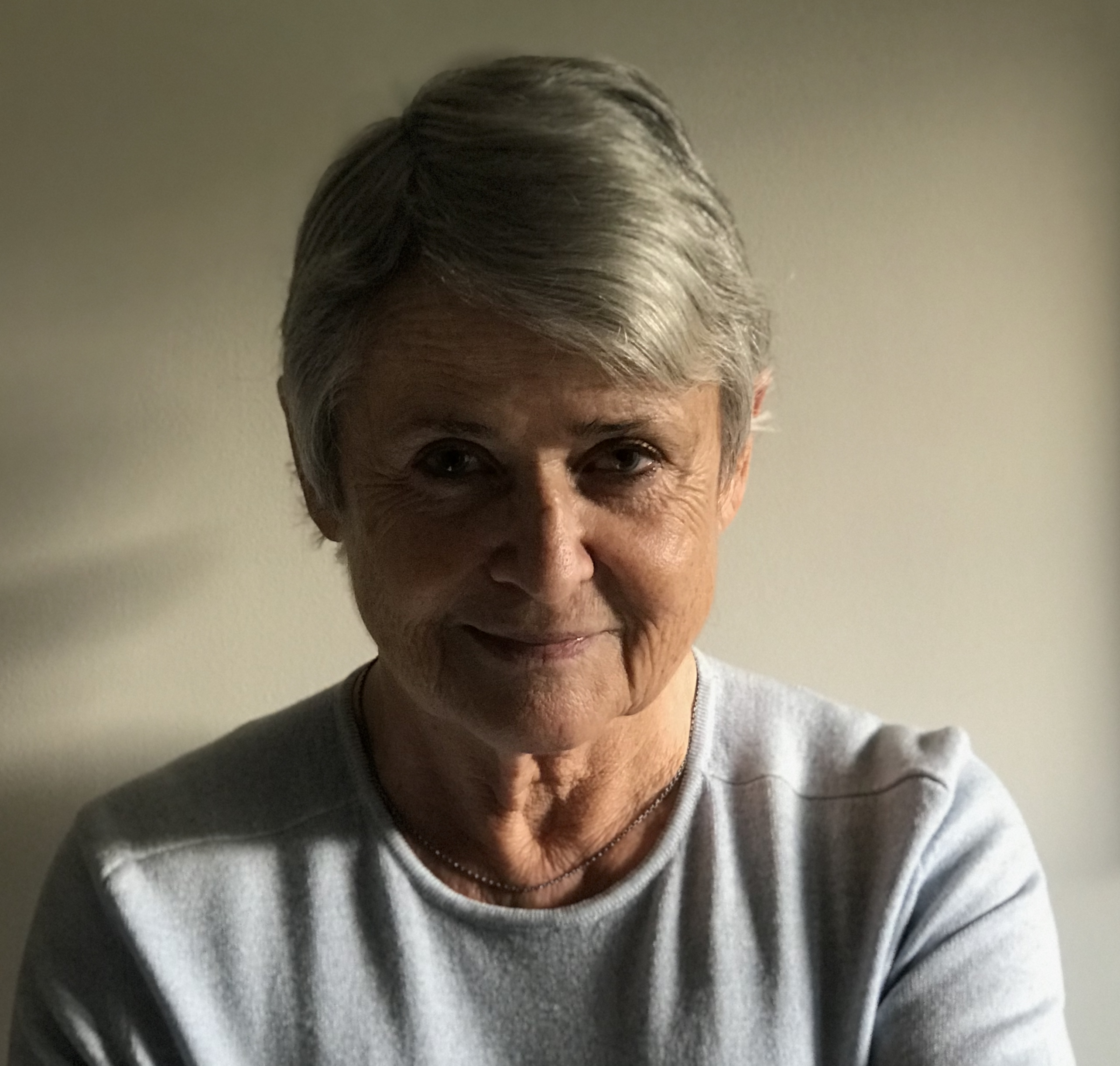
Geneviève Fraisse, 2021

Geneviève Fraisse (French: [fʁɛs]; born October 7, 1948) is a French feminist philosopher.

== Early life ==
She was born within Murs blancs ("White walls"), a community founded by Emmanuel Mounier in Châtenay-Malabry. Her parents, Paul Fraisse (an author of books of experimental psychology) and Simone Fraisse (an author of books on Charles Péguy, Ernest Renan, and Simone Weil), were both professors at the Sorbonne. During the May 68 uprising, she is a first year philosophy student at the Sorbonne. She co-funded with Jacques Rancière the journal Les Révoltes logiques ("Logical revolts").

== Career ==
Author of around 20 books, her work focuses on the political epistemology of feminist thought. Her research led her to postulate concepts on the "domestic service", "exclusive democracy," "women's reason", the "two governments", the "mixing of the sexes", "habeas corpus" and "consent". The complexity of the debate on gender led her to work closely with the historians, particularly on the synthesis of the history of women in the West. Seen as a leader of contemporary thought, her idea of gender equality lies between theory and practice, concepts and historicity.

Fraisse has been an interministerial delegate on women's rights from 1997 to 1998 and a Member of European Parliament from 1999 to 2004, as an independent member of the European United Left/Nordic Green Left. She took the initiative of two parliamentary agendas, one on the performing arts, the other on women and sport. Geneviève Fraisse has also been a producer at France Culture (Europe ideas, 2004–2008).

Geneviève Fraisse joined the French National Centre for Scientific Research (CNRS) in 1983. She helped create the International College of Philosophy (1984). She was visiting scholar at the Institute for Advanced Study in 1990. A doctor, she has been director of research at CNRS since 1997 and visiting professor at Rutgers University (US, 2000-2002). She was also president of the scientific committee of the Institut Emilie du Châtelet from 2006 to 2010. From 2011 to 2013, she gave a master class at Sciences Po Paris, "Pensée des sexes et démocratie", with the program PRESAGE (Programme de Recherche et de Savoir sur le Genre).

== Works ==
- (in French) Femmes toutes mains, essai sur le service domestique, Seuil, 1979.
  - New expanded edition : Service ou servitude, essai sur les femmes toutes mains, Le Bord de l’eau, 2009.
- (in French) Clémence Royer, philosophe et femme de science, La Découverte, 1985, réédition 2002.
- (in French) Muse de la raison, démocratie et exclusion des femmes en France, Alinea 1989, Folio-Gallimard, 1995, 2017.
- (in English) Reason's Muse: Sexual Difference and the Birth of Democracy, translated by Jane Marie Todd, University of Chicago press, 1994.
- (in French) Histoire des femmes en Occident. Vol. IV, XIXe, co-dirigé avec Michelle Perrot, sous la direction de Georges Duby et Michelle Perrot, Plon, 1991, Tempus, 2002.
- (in English) History of Women in the West, Volume IV: Emerging Feminism from Revolution to World War, translated by Arthur Goldhammer, series edited by Georges Duby and Michelle Perrot, Harvard University Press, 1993.
- (in French) La raison des femmes, Plon, 1992, partiellement repris dans Les femmes et leur histoire.
- (in French) La différence des sexes, PUF, 1996, repris dans À côté du genre : sexe et philosophie de l'égalité.
- (in French) Les femmes et leur histoire, Folio Gallimard, 1998, reprise partielle de La Raison des femmes, et autres textes.
- (in French) Deux femmes au royaume des hommes, avec Roselyne Bachelot-Narquin et la collaboration de Ghislaine Ottenheimer, Hachette Littérature, 1999.
- (in French) La controverse des sexes, PUF, 2001, repris dans À côté du genre : sexe et philosophie de l'égalité.
- (in French) Les deux gouvernements : la famille et la cité, Folio Gallimard, 2000.
- (in French) Le mélange des sexes, Gallimard jeunesse, 2006.
- (in French) Du consentement, Seuil, 2007, new expanded edition, 2017.
- (in French) Le privilège de Simone de Beauvoir, Actes Sud, 2008, Folio-Gallimard, 2018.
- (in French) L’Europe des idées suivi de Touriste en démocratie : chronique d'une élue du Parlement européen, 1999-2004, (avec Christine Guedj), L’Harmattan/France culture, 2008, 353 p.
- (in French) Service ou servitude : essai sur les femmes toutes mains, Le Bord de l'eau, 2009, nouvelle édition augmentée de Femmes toutes mains, essai sur le service domestique.
- (in French) À côté du genre : sexe et philosophie de l'égalité, Le Bord de l'eau, 2010, reprise de La Différence des sexes, La Controverse des sexes et autres textes
- (in French) Opinion d'une femme sur les femmes (préface), Fanny Raoul, Le Passager clandestin (éditions), 2011.
- (in French) La fabrique du féminisme : textes et entretiens, Le Passager clandestin, 2012, paperback 2018.
- (in French) Les excès du genre : concept, image, nudité, Éditions Lignes, 2014, new expanded edition, Points Seuil, 2019
- (in French) Regards sur le sport, DVD réalisé par Benjamin Pichery, Editions Montparnasse, 2015
- (in French) La Sexuation du monde, réflexions sur l'émancipation, Presses de Sciences Po, 2016.
- (in French) La Suite de l'Histoire, actrices, créatrices, Seuil, 2019
- (in French) Féminisme et philosophie, Folio Gallimard, 2020

== Collaborative works ==
- Histoire des femmes en Occident, volume IV : The nineteenth century collection edited by Georges Duby and Michelle Perrot, Plon, 1991, paperback 2002.
- Deux femmes au royaume des hommes, with Roselyne Bachelot-Narquin and Ghislaine Ottenheimer, Hachette Littérature, 1999.
- À côté du genre, Masculin-Féminin, La Découverte, 2004.
- Gender, in profile, Keywords/gender, New-York, The Other Press, 2004 ; New Delhi, Vistaar Publications, 2004

== Editor ==
- Opinions de femmes, de la veille au lendemain de la Révolution Française (M.-A. Gacon-Dufour, O. de Gouges, C. de Salm, A. Clément-Hémery, F. Raoul), editor, Côté-Femmes, 1989.

== Sources ==
This article was translated from its equivalent in the French Wikipedia on 19 July 2009.
