= William J. Richardson =

American philosopher (1920–2016)

William J. Richardson SJ
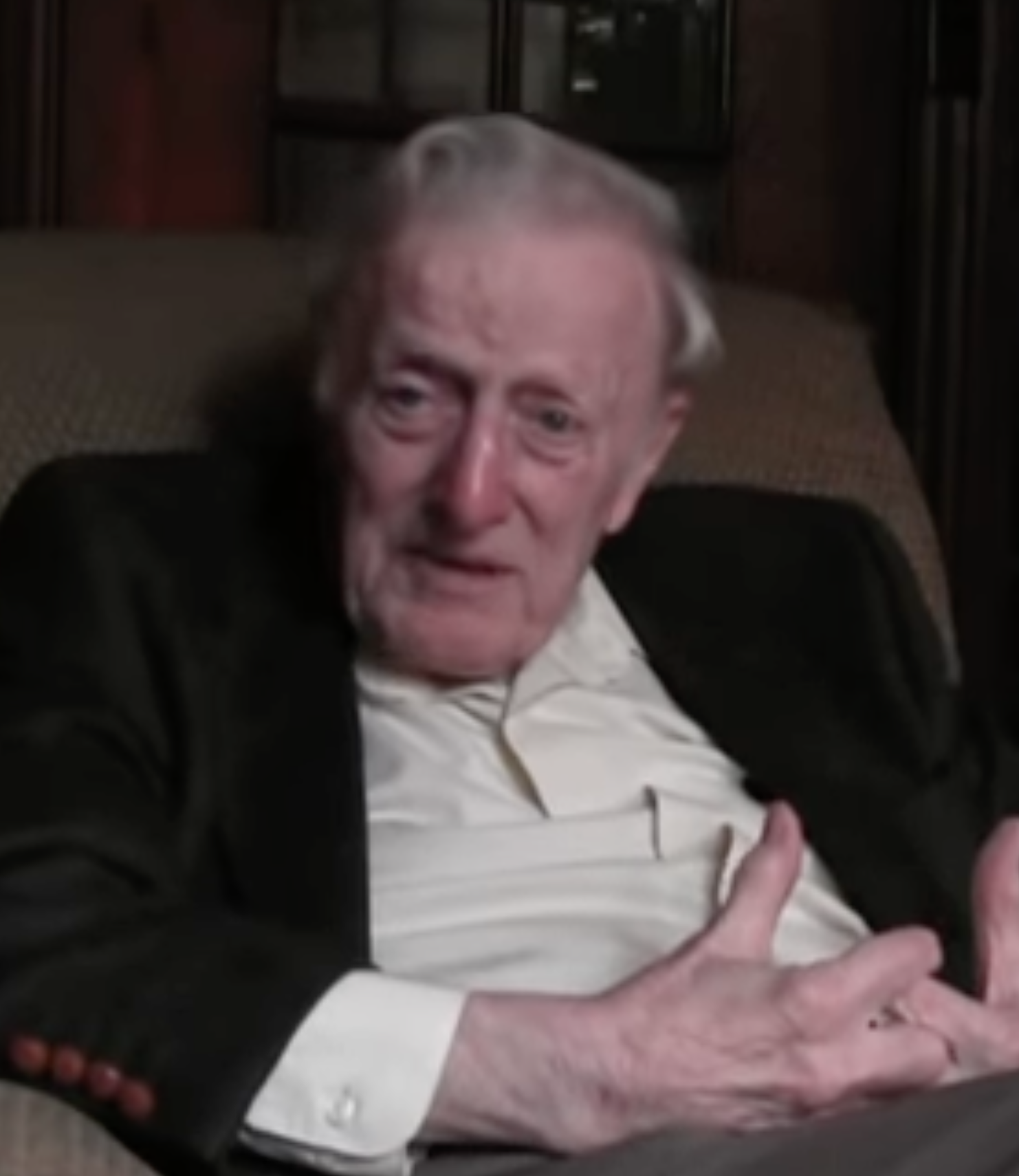
- Richardson in 2011
- Born: William John Richardson; November 2, 1920; New York City, U.S.
- Died: December 10, 2016 (aged 96); Weston, Massachusetts, U.S.

Education
- Education: College of the Holy Cross (BA); Woodstock College (PhL); University of Freiburg; Catholic University of Leuven (ThL, PhD)
- Doctoral advisor: Alphonse De Waelhens
- Other advisors: Martin Heidegger; Max Müller

Philosophical work
- Era: Contemporary philosophy
- Region: Western philosophy
- School: Continental philosophy Phenomenology
- Institutions: Fordham University (1965–80); Austen Riggs Center (1974–79); Boston College (1981–2007)
- Doctoral students: Thomas Sheehan; Richard M. Capobianco
- Main interests: Metaphysics, psychoanalysis
- Notable works: Heidegger: Through Phenomenology to Thought (1963)

William John Richardson (November 2, 1920 – December 10, 2016) was an American philosopher and psychoanalyst who was a leading scholar of Martin Heidegger. He was a professor of philosophy at Fordham University from 1965 to 1980 and a professor of philosophy at Boston College from 1981 to 2007. He was best known for his book Heidegger: Through Phenomenology to Thought (1963), which was one of the first comprehensive studies of Heidegger's philosophy and featured a preface by Heidegger himself.

== Early life and education ==
Richardson was born on November 2, 1920, in Brooklyn, New York City, to Frederick E. Richardson and Mary (née Oliver) Richardson. He had a sister, Margaret Powers. His father, Frederick, was a farmer who migrated to New York City.

Richardson enrolled at the College of the Holy Cross in Worcester, Massachusetts, in 1937. As an undergraduate at Holy Cross, he was classmates with Edward Bennett Williams and was a noted thespian who played Richard II in Shakespeare's Richard II and had a lead role in Antigone. He was elected president of his class, served as the president of the college's Alpha Sigma Nu chapter, and graduated with a Bachelor of Arts, cum laude, as valedictorian in 1941 after completing a senior thesis titled, "Psychology of Habit in the Formation of Character". Shortly after graduation, he entered the Jesuit order at a seminary in Poughkeepsie, New York, serving as a novitiate from 1941 to 1943, then a juniorate from 1943 to 1944.

After earning a Ph.L. in philosophy from Woodstock College in 1947, Richardson taught English and philosophy at Le Moyne College for three years. He was ordained to the priesthood on August 15, 1953, in Leuven, Belgium. He then earned a Th.L. from the Collège Saint-Albert in Leuven in 1954. In 1955, he completed his tertianship in Austria. Afterwards, Richardson initially intended to pursue a doctorate in theology under theologian Karl Rahner, but was convinced during his tertianship to instead pursue a doctorate in philosophy, which would allow him to remain in the U.S. to teach metaphysics. He matriculated at the Higher Institute of Philosophy at the Catholic University of Leuven but spent his first semester at the University of Freiburg, where he took courses under Heidegger, who was a lecturer there. While in Germany, Richardson also studied under the Catholic philosopher Max Müller. His doctoral advisor at Leuven was Alphonse De Waelhens, a specialist in Heidegger studies who wrote on Being and Time.

In the fall of 1955, Richardson met with Heidegger and was persuaded by him to study Seinsdenken, or "foundational thought," in his works. In 1956, he returned to the University of Leuven and spent three years completing a 1,100-page dissertation on the subject. During a meeting in February 1959, Heidegger approved the doctoral manuscript with only two suggested corrections. Richardson defended his dissertation in the spring of 1960, earned his Ph.D. in philosophy, and, in 1962, qualified for agrégation.

== Career ==
Richardson had pronounced his final vows on August 15, 1958. In 1963, he began teaching philosophy to Jesuit seminarians in Shrub Oak, New York, then took a year-long sabbatical, after which he secured an appointment to the philosophy department at Fordham University in 1965. It was during his time teaching at Fordham that Richardson began a lifelong interest in psychoanalysis and the works of Jacques Lacan; from 1969–1974, he obtained a certificate in psychoanalysis from the William Alanson White Institute while simultaneously pursuing research at the Austen Riggs Center in Stockbridge, Massachusetts. He was eventually appointed the director of research at the Austen Riggs Center in 1974, serving until 1979. After attending Lacan's lectures at Yale University and Columbia University in November and December 1975, respectively, Richardson met Lacan in Paris in 1978.

In 1980, Richardson resigned from Fordham and, in 1981, took up a position as a professor of philosophy at Boston College, where he was a colleague of Hans-Georg Gadamer, Jacques Taminiaux, and Richard Kearney and taught Heidegger, Lacan, and ethics. By the time he joined Boston College, he was one of the leading American authorities on Heidegger's thought.

At the time of his death, he was a professor emeritus of philosophy at Boston College. He died in December 2016 in Weston, Massachusetts, at the age of 96.

== Bibliography ==
- Richardson, William J. (1963). Heidegger: Through Phenomenology to Thought. Preface by Martin Heidegger. Martinus Nijhoff Publishers. ISBN 978-0-8232-2255-1. 4th Edition: Fordham University Press, 2003. ISBN 0-8232-2255-1
- Muller, John P.; Richardson, William J. (1982). Lacan and Language: A Reader's Guide to Écrits. International Universities Press. ISBN 978-0-8236-8129-7.
- Richardson, William J. (1994). "Lacan and the Enlightenment: Antigone's Choice". Research in Phenomenology. 24 (1): 25–41. doi:10.1163/156916494X00032.
- (With John P. Muller) The Purloined Poe, Lacan, Derrida & Psychoanalytic Reading. Baltimore, London: Johns Hopkins University Press, 1988.
- (With John P. Muller), Ouvrir les Écrits de Lacan, adapté par P. Julien. Toulouse: Eres, 1987.
- Heidegger : Through Phenomenology to Thought. Preface by Martin Heidegger. Fortieth Anniversary Edition, with New Writer's Preface and Epilogue. New York: Fordham University Press, 2003.

== See also ==
- List of American philosophers

== Sources ==
- Babich, Babette E., ed. (1995). From Phenomenology to Thought, Errancy, and Desire: Essays in Honor of William J. Richardson, S.J. Phaenomenologica. Vol. 133. Dordrecht: Springer Netherlands. doi:10.1007/978-94-017-1624-6. ISBN 978-90-481-4576-8.
- Richard M. Capobianco. Engaging Heidegger. Foreword by William J. Richardson. University of Toronto Press, 2010, softcover 2011.
- Babich, Babette, ed. (March 24, 2017). "William J. Richardson, S.J.: Reflections in Memoriam". Fordham Articles and Chapters (89). Fordham University Press: v–97.
