= Institute of Philosophy =

Institute of Philosophy can mean:

- Institute of Philosophy, KU Leuven (formerly the Higher Institute of Philosophy)
- Higher Institute of Philosophy, University of Louvain
- Institute of Philosophy, University of London
- Institute of Philosophy, Russian Academy of Sciences
- Institute of Philosophy, University of Warsaw
