= Jacques Taminiaux =

Belgian philosopher and professor (1928–2019)

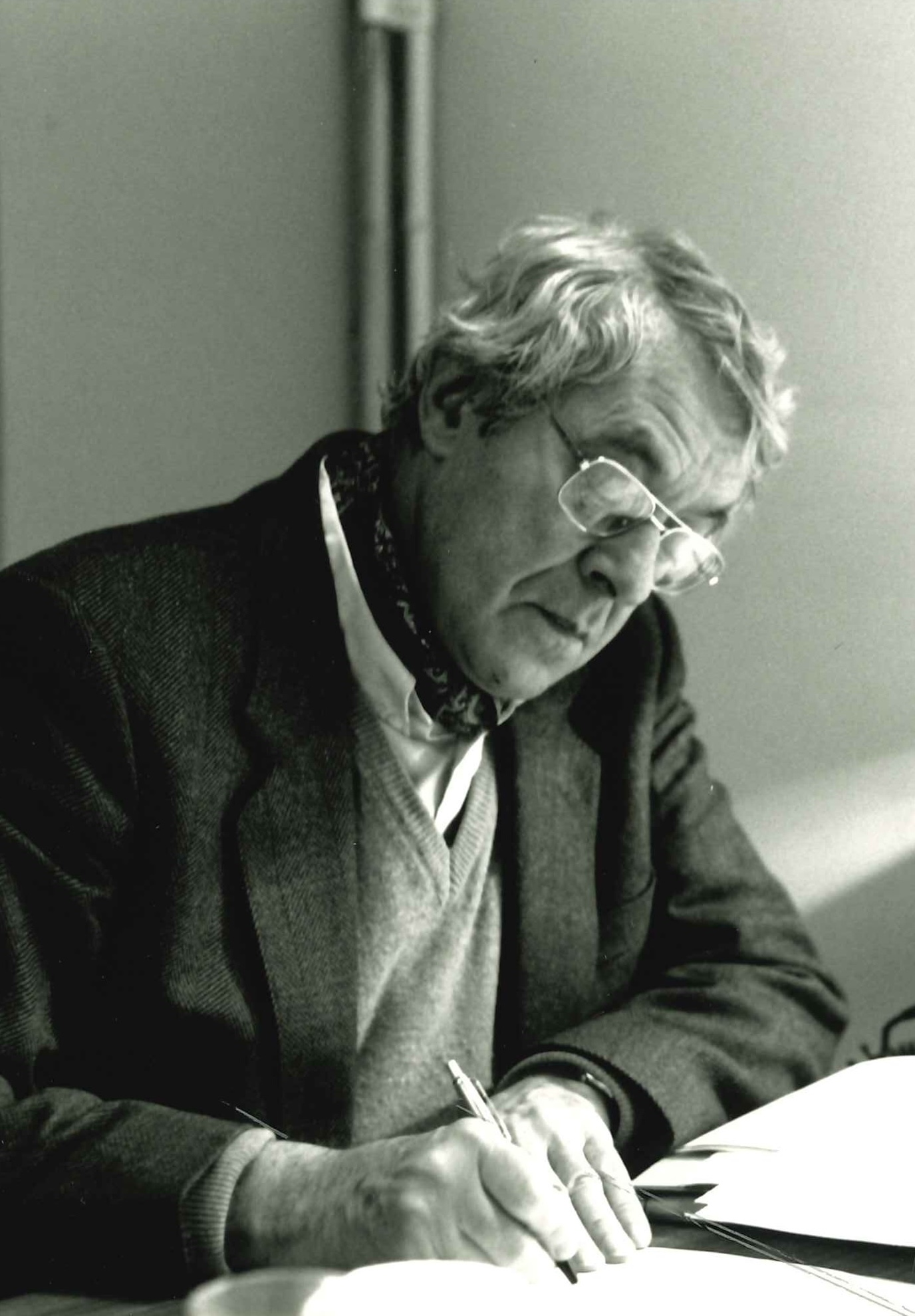

Jacques Taminiaux (French: [taminjo]; 29 May 1928 – 7 May 2019) was a Belgian philosopher and professor at Boston College in Chestnut Hill, Massachusetts, United States.

== Biography ==
Born in Seneffe, Taminiaux studied law and philosophy at the Catholic University of Leuven, Belgium. His research interests are on phenomenology, aesthetics, political philosophy and contemporary continental philosophy.

Together with Herman Van Breda, he worked on the Husserl-Archives Leuven (the research center responsible for the publication of the philosophical work of Edmund Husserl) at the Higher Institute of Philosophy of the Catholic University of Leuven. In 1977, he was awarded the Francqui Prize on Human Sciences for his work on the history of philosophy.

Taminiaux died on 7 May 2019, at the age of 90.

== Books ==
- La Nostalgie de la Grèce à l’aube de l‘idéalisme allemand: Kant et les Grecs dans l’itinéraire de Schiller, de Hölderlin et de Hegel. La Haye: Martinus Nijhoff, 1967, 274 p.
- Le regard et l’excédent. La Haye: Martinus Nijhoff (Phaenomenologica, 75), 1977, 182 p.
- Recoupements. Bruxelles: Ousia, 1982, 212 p.
- Naissance de la philosophie hégélienne de l’Etat. Commentaire et traduction de la Realphilosophie d’Iéna (1805–1806). Paris: Payot (Critique de la politique), 1984.
- Dialectic and Difference. Finitude in Modern Thought. Translated by James Decker and Robert Crease, Atlantic Highlands: Humanities Press, 1985, 177 p. (Paperback edition, 1990).
- Lectures de l’ontologie fondamentale. Essais sur Heidegger. Grenoble: Millon (Krisis), 1989, 300 p.
- Heidegger and the Project of Fundamental Ontology. Translated and edited in English by Michael Gendre, Albany: State University of New York Press (SUNY Series in Contemporary Continental Philosophy), 1991, 233 p.
- La fille de Thrace et le penseur professionnel. Arendt et Heidegger. Paris: Payot (Critique de la politique), 1992, 247 p.
- The Thracian Maid and the Professional Thinker: Arendt and Heidegger,translated by Michael Gendre, New York: SUNY Press, 1997.
- Poetics, Speculation, and Judgment. The Shadow of the Work of Art from Kant to Phenomenology. Translated and edited by Michael Gendre, Albany: State University of New York Press (SUNY Series in Contemporary Continental Philosophy), 1993, 191 p.
- Le Théâtre des philosophes. Grenoble: Millon, 1995, 303 p.
- Lectures de l’ontologie fondamentale. Grenoble: Millon, 1995 (2d, revised ed.)
- Het Thracische dienstmeisje en de professionele denker: Hannah Arendt en Martin Heidegger, Vertaling: Jos Augustus en Ineke van der Burg, Nijmegen, SUN, 2000
- Sillages phénoménologiques: auditeurs et lecteurs de Heidegger. Brussels: Editions Ousia, 2002, 296 p.
- The Metamorphoses of Phenomenological Reduction. Milwaukee: Marquette University Press, 2004, 69 p.

=== Translations to French ===
- Heidegger (Martin), Qu'est-ce qu'une chose ?, traduit de l'allemand par Jean Reboul et Jacques Taminiaux, Paris Gallimard, 971. 256 p.
- Hegel (G.W.F.), Système de la vie éthique, présentation et traduction de Jacques Taminiaux, Paris, Payot (Critique de la politique). 1976, 211 p.
