= Metaethics from a First Person Standpoint =

2016 book by Catherine Wilson

- Author: Catherine Wilson
- Language: English
- Subject: meta-ethics
- Published: 2016
- Publisher: Open Book Publishers
- Media type: Print
- Pages: 132 (viii + 124)
- ISBN: 978-1-78374-198-4

Metaethics from a First Person Standpoint: An Introduction to Moral Philosophy is a 2016 book by Catherine Wilson which deals with the central questions of metaethics. The author aims to present a coherent and positive argument for the existence of moral knowledge that would be persuasive in the face of the possibility that morality is both a natural phenomenon and a human invention. The book is licensed under a Creative Commons Attribution 4.0 International license (CC BY 4.0).

== Reception ==
The book has been reviewed in Ratio by Gerald Lang (from University of Leeds) and in Ethical Perspectives by Herman Philipse (from Utrecht University). Gerald Lang calls the book "enjoyable, intellectually nimble, and thought-provoking." and Philipse recommends it "warmly" because it "is written beautifully, and a great pleasure to read."

It also received short reviews from Meredith Gunning (Full Professor, Northern Essex Community College), Matthew Shadle (Associate Professor, Marymount University), and Lisa Kemmerer (Professor, Montana State University Billings).

== Content ==
Metaethics from a First Person Standpoint presupposes no prior training in philosophy and addresses the major topics and themes of contemporary metaethics, the study of the analysis of moral thought and judgement. Metathetics is less concerned with what practices are right or wrong than with what we mean by ‘right’ and ‘wrong.’ Looking at a wide spectrum of topics including moral language, realism and anti-realism, reasons and motives, relativism, and moral progress, this book engages students and general readers in order to enhance their understanding of morality and moral discourse as cultural practices. Catherine Wilson employs a first-person narrator to report step-by-step an individual’s reflections, beginning from a position of radical scepticism, on the possibility of objective moral knowledge. The reader is invited to follow along with this reasoning, and to challenge or agree with each major point. Incrementally, the narrator is led to certain definite conclusions about ‘oughts’ and norms in connection with self-interest, prudence, social norms, and finally morality. Scepticism is overcome, and the narrator arrives at a good understanding of how moral knowledge and moral progress are possible, though frequently long in coming.

Wilson takes a strategy similar to that of Descartes, inventing an Enquirer who, in a state of uncertainty and confusion, decides to adopt the assumption that nothing is really good or bad, obligatory or prohibited, and that there is no such thing as moral understanding or moral knowledge. Her aim is to explore this position to see where it would lead and whether it would run into difficulties.
