= Descartes's Gambit =

1988 book by Peter Markie

- Title page for Descartes's Gambit (1988)
- Author: Peter Markie
- Language: English
- Subject: Descartes's philosophy
- Published: 1988
- Publisher: Cornell University Press
- Media type: Print
- Pages: 278
- ISBN: 9780801419065

Descartes's Gambit is a 1988 book by Peter Markie which deals with Descartes's attempt to develop a metaphysical theory of the self based on premises describing his self-knowledge.

== Reception ==
The book was reviewed by Martha Brandt Bolton, Catherine Wilson, and Steven DeHaven.
