= Husserliana =

Complete works of the philosopher Edmund Husserl

The Husserliana is the complete works project of the philosopher Edmund Husserl (April 8, 1859 – April 27, 1938), which was made possible by Herman Van Breda after he saved the manuscripts of Husserl. The Husserliana is published by the Husserl Archives of the Higher Institute of Philosophy of the Catholic University of Leuven. The Husserliana series are edited jointly by the current director of the Archives, Professor Rudolph Bernet, and Professor Ullrich Melle.

The Husserliana have been published first by Martinus Nijhoff, which was then acquired by Kluwer Academic Publishers and after the merger of Kluwer and Springer, is now published by Springer.

There are four series that go by the name of Husserliana:

- Husserliana: Edmund Husserl Gesammelte Werke
- Husserliana Dokumente
- Husserliana Materialien
- Husserliana Collected Works

== Husserliana: Edmund Husserl Gesammelte Werke ==
This is the main series in which Edmund Husserl's works are being edited. It is often referenced in secondary literature using the abbreviated title Hua followed by the appropriate volume number. Volumes contain both previously published books and articles in a critical edition as well as selections from unpublished manuscripts conserved at the Husserl-Archives Leuven.

== Husserliana Dokumente ==
This series contains mostly historical and biographical volumes. It contains some of the most valuable tools for Husserl-research: the Husserl-Chronik and the Briefwechsel, i.e. the complete edition of Husserl's correspondence, both edited by Karl Schuhmann. The Husserl Bibliography also appeared in this series.

== Husserliana Materialien ==
This series contains mostly lectures delivered by Husserl and other material which for thematic or other reasons do not really fit into the main critical edition series. Important publications in the Materialien have been Husserl's lectures on logic from 1896 and on Urteilstheorie (theory of judgment) from 1905. Recently the long-awaited "C-Manuscripts" on time-consciousness have been made available in this series.

== Husserliana Collected Works ==
The Collected Works is the series which contains official English translations of material from the Husserliana series. Besides Husserl's Ideas, some of Husserl's early works have been translated in this series, such as Vol. X, containing the Philosophy of Arithmetic.
