= Heelan =

Heelan is a surname. Notable people with the surname include:

- Briga Heelan (born 1987), American actress and comedian
- Edmond Heelan (1868–1948), Irish-born American Roman Catholic bishop
- Patrick Aidan Heelan (1926–2015), Irish-American Jesuit priest, physicist, and philosopher of science
- Will A. Heelan, American lyricist
