= Penicillium verhagenii =

Scientific classification
- Domain: Eukaryota
- Kingdom: Fungi
- Division: Ascomycota
- Class: Eurotiomycetes
- Order: Eurotiales
- Family: Aspergillaceae
- Genus: Penicillium
- Species: P. verhagenii

Binomial name
- Penicillium verhagenii Houbraken 2014

Type strain
- CBS 137959, DTO 193-A1

Species of fungus

Penicillium verhagenii is a species of fungus in the genus Penicillium which was isolated from Postel in Belgium.
