= Ezaart =

- Township
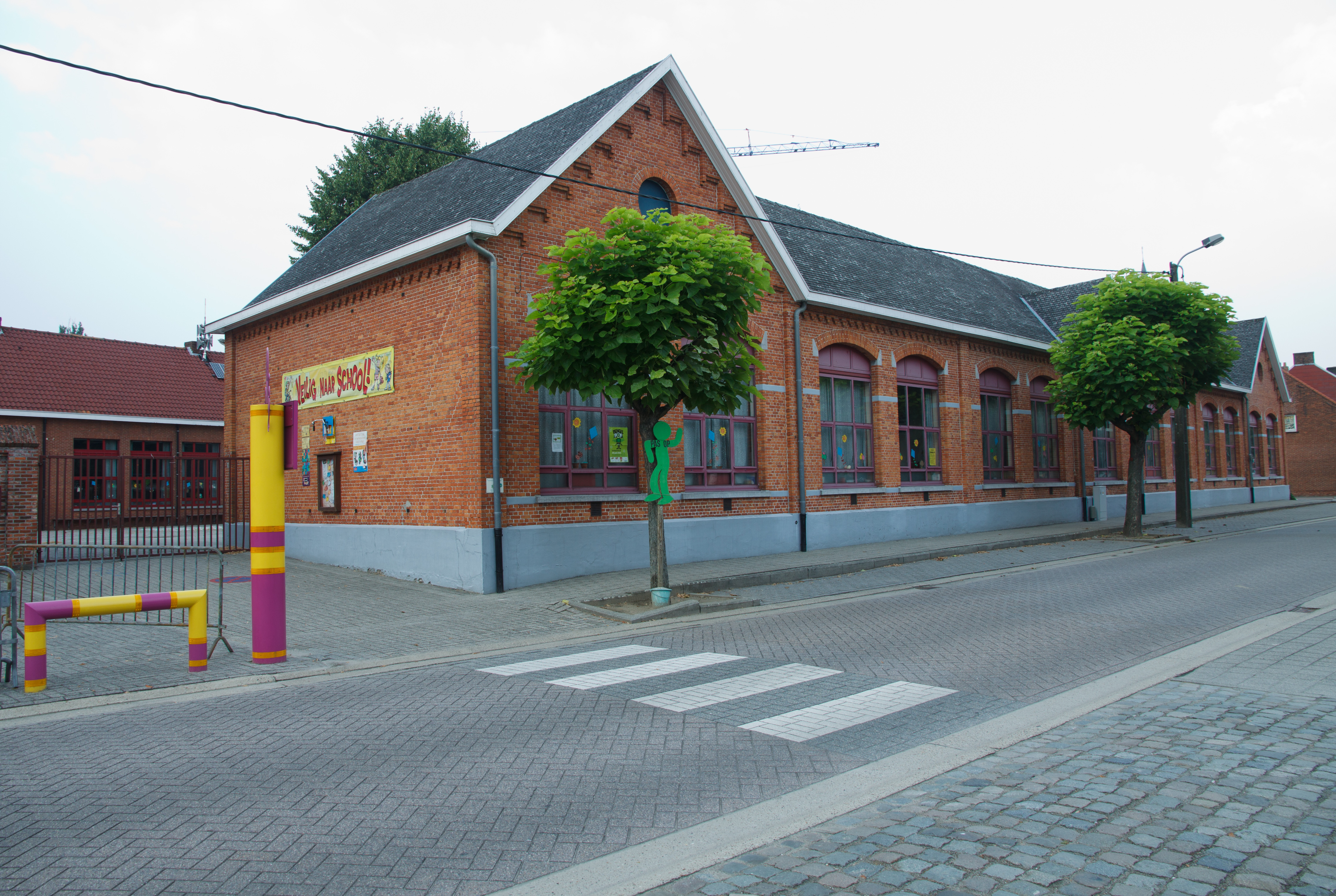
- School

- Location within Belgium
- Coordinates: 51°10′42″N 5°5′17″E
- Country: Belgium
- Province: Antwerp
- Municipality: Mol

Area
  - Total: 4.15 km^{2} (1.60 sq mi)

Population (2021)
  - Total: 4,234
  - Density: 1,020/km^{2} (2,640/sq mi)
- Postal code: 2400

Ezaart is one of the 12 townships in the municipality Mol in Belgium. It had 3332 inhabitants (31 December 2013). The township also includes "Hessie" which was formerly part of Millegem and therefore Geel.

== Toponymy ==
The name Ezaart derives from Esaert as it was written a long time ago. The word Esaert contains two words: es and aert. Es is an old Dutch word for shrub and aert for a lowland.

There is also another explanation. It is said there once was a farmer travelling between Mol and Geel. He had a stubborn donkey which would not move anymore. The farmer got some help from local people and they pushed and pulled the donkey to get him to move. However, they pulled so strong on the animal's tail, it broke off. This incident should have taken place in front of the little chapel "Mary in need". In this opinion, Ezaart derives from the Dutch words "ezel" (= Donkey) and "staart" (= tail). A sculpture has been placed before the chapel to remember the incident, although it is most probably an urban legend.

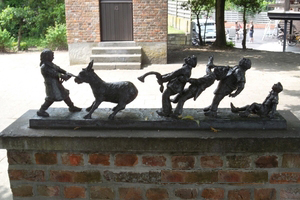
The sculpture "Ezelsstaart"

== Interesting locations ==
- Ezaartmolen, a windmill built in 1856. It was destroyed during a storm in 1957. In 1960 it was decided to protect the mill, but it took until 1984 before it was repaired. The mill is now the only one in Mol which can be actively used.
- the little chapel "Mary in need" was built in 1511. There used to be tilias around the chapel. It was destroyed in 1971 after a car crash. In 1975 the chapel was rebuilt with the genuine materials.
- The chapel "Sint-Willibrordus" got its name in 1494 during a benefice of Willebrord. It is known the chapel is older. In 1696 the chapel was extended. During the French revolution, the chapel was closed. It was reused as some kind of customs and later as a school. In 1926 the chapel was donated to the "Saint Peter and Paul-church" in Mol. In 1996 the chapel was renovated. It is now used for cultural performances.
