= Jacob Buyens van Mol =

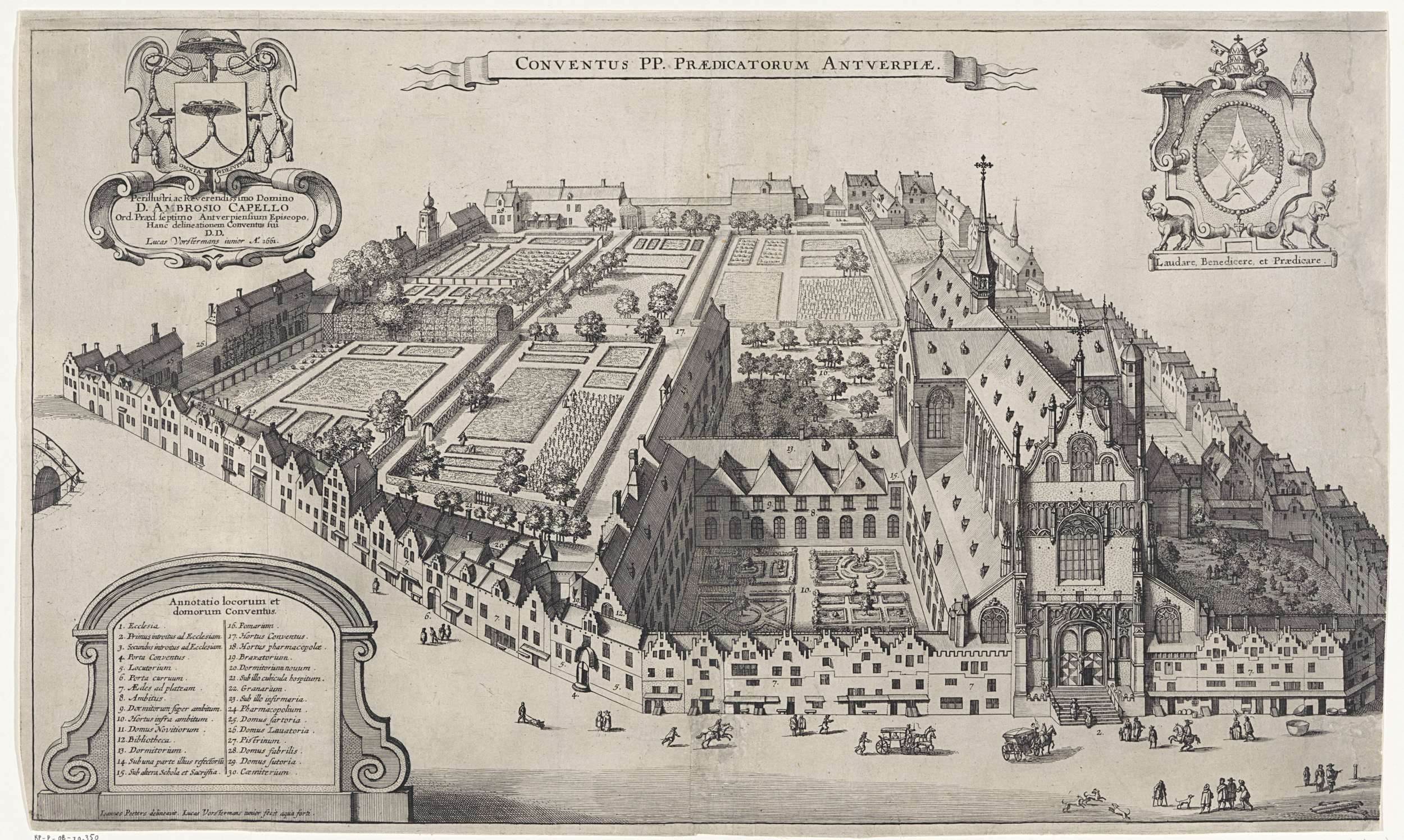
The Dominican monastery of Antwerp in the 17th century

Jacob Buyens van Mol (died 12 June 1604) was a Flemish Dominican friar, priest and writer.

== Biography ==
Jacob (French: Jacques) Buyens was born in Mol, in the Campine region of north-eastern Belgium. He entered the Dominicans in Antwerp and became a Roman Catholic priest. He was a lecturer in theology and prefect of the Brotherhood of the Rosary. He also distinguished himself as a preacher in his monastery. Buyens published Gheestelyke oeffeninghe om eenigheydt met Godt te cryghen and Den costelycken schadt der Broederschap van H. Roosen-Kransken van de aldereerweerdichste Moeder Godts in de Predic-heeren oorden ingestelt, printed in 12 volumes in Antwerp in 1600 by Hieronymus Verdussen and republished by the same printer in 8 volumes in 1614. In 1605 the work was published in Gothic letters by Corneille Verschueren. He then prepared material for an edition of the treatise De Reformatione Religiosorum by Jean Nider or Nyder. His premature death, however, did not allow him to complete this work, which was published in 1611 by P. Boucquet. Buyens also left the manuscripts Vita B. Zegheri (Vie du bienheurenx Zegher), written in Latin and kept in Lillers until the French Revolution, and Vies de hommes illustres de l'ordre de Sain-Dominique en Angleterre, en Écosse, en Saxe et dan le Pays-Bas, written in Flemish.

He died on 12 June 1604 in his convent in Antwerp. He was buried in the cloister.

== Works ==
- Gheestelyke oeffeninghe om eenigheydt met Godt te cryghen. (?)
- Den costelycken schadt der Broederschap van H. Roosen-Kransken van de aldereerweerdichste Moeder Godts in de Predic-heeren oorden ingestelt. (1600) (reprint: 1605; 1614)
- De Reformatione Religiosorum, Tractatus a Joanne Nyder, ord. Praed., compositus, a mendis vero a Jac. Buyens purgatus; additis locorum Scripturae ac S.S. Patrum indicationibus illustratus. (1611)
- Vie du bienheurenx Zegher.
- Vies de hommes illustres de l'ordre de Sain-Dominique en Angleterre, en Écosse, en Saxe et dan le Pays-Bas.
