= Postel Abbey =

Monastery in Belgium

Coordinates: 51.2890°N 5.1899°E

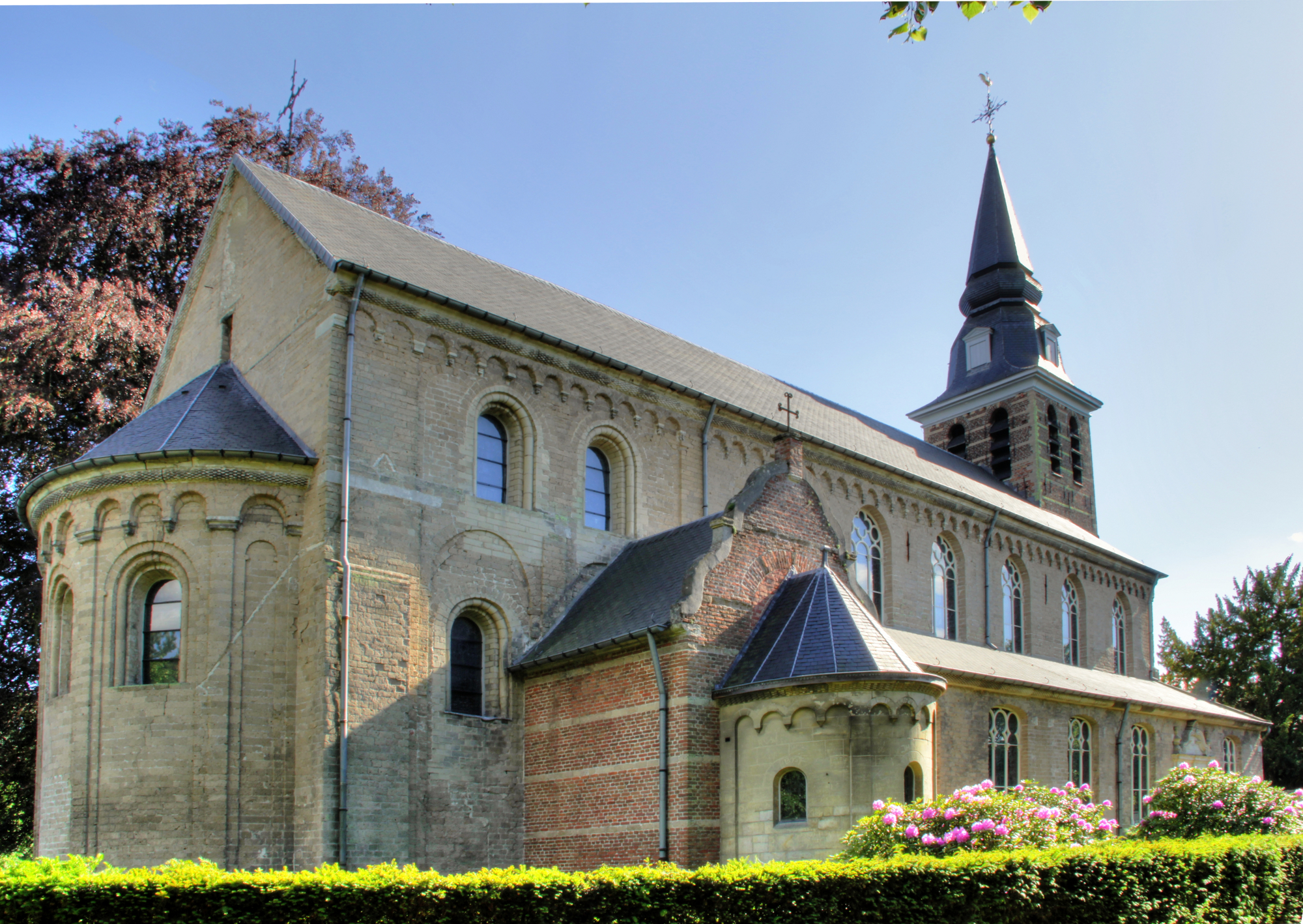
Church of the abbey

Postel Abbey is a Premonstratensian abbey in the Belgian municipality of Mol in the province of Antwerp.

== History ==
In 1138, Premonstratensian canons from Floreffe Abbey founded the monastery at Postel as a dependent priory. It was located at a crossroads where important medieval roads met, on land given to Floreffe by Fastrad of Uitwijk. The church was dedicated in August 1040.

The canons practiced forestry, agriculture and cattle breeding. In 1613, Postel became independent of Floreffe and in 1618 was raised to the status of abbey. Besides pioneering quarrying work in the region, the canons offered hospitality to travellers, In 1797, the abbey was closed, and the canons expelled, in the course of the French Revolution, when French troops invaded the Austrian Netherlands. The carillon was lost at this time. In 1847, the community here was re-established, after which the abbey buildings were restored in several phases.

From 1943 until the end of World War II, Herman Van Breda hid part of the manuscripts of Edmund Husserl (Husserl Archives) in the abbey. In September 1944, the abbey, full of refugees, was occupied by German soldiers. They left on September 22, with the near approach of British troops accompanied by a Resistance fighter from Mol.

== Architecture ==
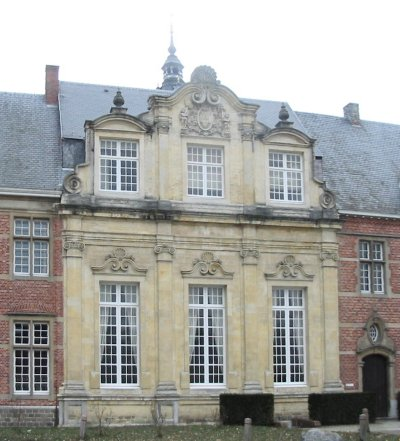
Postel: Baroque Refectory of the abbey

The second abbey church, dedicated to St. Nicholas, was built in the Rhineland Romanesque style and dates from the end of the 12th century (1190). The church has since been rebuilt several times, as a result of which the building shows some characteristics of Gothic and Baroque styles. The abbey is still surrounded by walls, and partially by moats.

== Present day ==
The Norbertines of Postel work in parishes, mostly in the vicinity of the abbey. As of 2023 there were about twenty canons living at the abbey.

Traditionally, Postel abbey produced Postel, the abbey beer. This beer is no longer brewed within the abbey itself but in a commercial brewery in Opwijk. The abbey started producing cheese in 1947. Since 1994, the monks have also developed a botanical garden of medicinal plants, where they cultivate ginseng.

In 1970 a guesthouse was opened. The information center provides tourist information about the region, cycling routes, walking brochures and regional curiosities and places of interest. The abbey is a venue for "Musica Divina", the Festival of Flanders Mechelen/Kempen's autumn concert series.

== See also ==
- Averbode Abbey
- List of carillons in Belgium

== Sources ==
- (in Dutch) Postel Abbey official website
- (in Dutch) Postel Abbey botanical garden
