= Patrick A. Heelan =

Irish Jesuit priest, physicist, and philosopher of science

Patrick Aidan Heelan, S.J. (17 March 1926 – 1 February 2015) was an Irish Jesuit priest, physicist, and philosopher of science. He was William A. Gaston Professor of Philosophy at Georgetown University.

== Biography ==
Patrick A. Heelan was born in Dublin to an Irish father and a Belgian mother. He joined the Society of Jesus at 16, received his B.A. in 1947 and his M.A. in 1948, all with first-class honors, in mathematics and mathematical physics at University College, Dublin during which time he also worked with Erwin Schrödinger and John Synge at the Dublin Institute for Advanced Studies both mathematicians famous for their work in general relativity and cosmology. In 1948, he won a prestigious travelling studentship from the National University of Ireland, funding doctoral studies abroad. His superior directed him to take his doctorate in mathematical physics at the Institute of Geophysics at St. Louis University as a junior Jesuit scholastic, where he specialised in geophysics and seismology. Later he would take a second PhD in philosophy of science with a concentration on the philosophy of modern physics with a novel approach from the phenomenological and hermeneutical perspective of Husserl and Heidegger. From 1953 to 1954, Heelan worked as a research associate in theoretical physics at the Dublin Institute for Advanced Studies. He returned there again as a research associate in cosmic physics from 1964 to 1965.

He then taught physics at UCD for several years before being asked by the Archbishop of Dublin to teach the philosophy of science. Patrick Heelan's sense that he needed more philosophy for this brought him, in two steps, first to an encounter with Bernard Lonergan's 1957 book Insight (starting with the original notes in Latin), and then after a two-year post-doc working with Eugene Wigner at Princeton University (1960–62), which also gave him, at the start his first experience at Fordham University, Dr Heelan returned to Europe to pursue a second doctorate in philosophy (September 1962 – 1964) at the Catholic University of Louvain at Leuven (in Belgium) where he worked with Jean Ladrière, studying both logic and Husserlian philosophy (Ladrière would write the biographical entries on Patrick Heelan, including his first book, for the French Encyclopédie Philosophique Universelle). He defended his dissertation (with félications du jury) and published Quantum Mechanics and Objectivity in 1965 (Martinus Nijhoff Publishers, Table of Contents and Preface). During the same period he began his visits and correspondence with Werner Heisenberg himself at the Max-Planck Institute for Physics and Astrophysics in Munich, a contact Heelan maintained until Heisenberg's death in 1976.

In 1965, Heelan joined the philosophy department at Fordham University. He would leave in 1970 at the invitation of John Toll, then the president of State University of New York at Stony Brook, to chair (and to build) the department of philosophy where over the next 22 years he would also fill several major positions in the administration of the university. He published his second major study, Space Perception and the Philosophy of Science with the University of California Press in 1983, which examines the geometry of vision including the space of art and experience and draws on Husserl, Heidegger, and Merleau-Ponty. He came to Georgetown University as executive vice-president for the main campus in 1992 and in 1995, he became the William A. Gaston Professor of Philosophy. The year of 2002, saw the publication of a festschrift, edited by Babette Babich, Hermeneutic Philosophy of Science, Van Gogh's Eyes, and God: Essays in Honor of Patrick A. Heelan, S.J. which appeared as Volume 225 in the Boston Studies in the Philosophy of Science. His third book, The Observable, also edited by Babette Babich came out in 2016 although written almost a half a century before; completed while Heisenberg was still living, it dealt with Heisenberg, Bohr, and Pauli, in addition to Einstein. Patrick Heelan, who continued to write and to teach until he retired from the philosophy department in 2013, returned to Dublin in 2014. He died in Dublin in 2015.

== Main publications ==
- Quantum Mechanics and Objectivity (Nijhoff: The Hague, 1965).
- Space Perception and the Philosophy of Science (Berkeley: University of California Press, 1983).
- The Observable – Heisenberg's Philosophy of Quantum Mechanics (New York: Peter Lang Publishing, Inc., 2016)
