= Mol, Belgium =

Mol
- Municipality
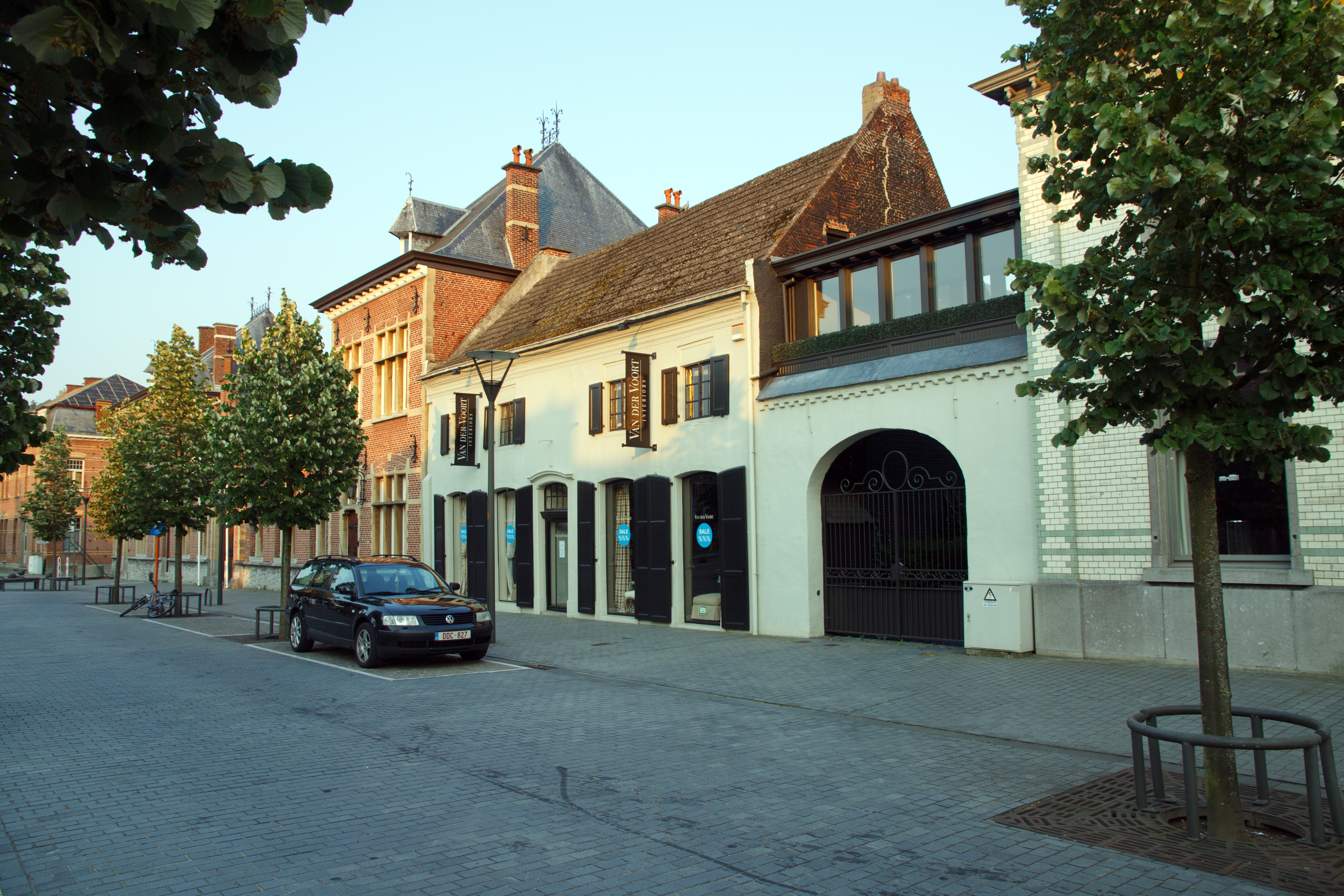

- Flag Coat of arms

- Location of Mol in the province of Antwerp
- Interactive map of Mol
- Location in Belgium
- Coordinates: 51°11′N 05°07′E
- Country: Belgium
- Community: Flemish Community
- Region: Flemish Region
- Province: Antwerp
- Arrondissement: Turnhout

Government
  - Mayor: Wim Caeyers (CD&V)
  - Governing parties: CD&V, N-VA

Area
  - Total: 114.55 km^{2} (44.23 sq mi)

Population (2020-01-01)
  - Total: 37,022
  - Density: 323.20/km^{2} (837.07/sq mi)
- Postal codes: 2400
- NIS code: 13025
- Area codes: 014, 011
- Website: gemeentemol.be

Mol (Dutch pronunciation: [mɔl]) is a municipality located in the Belgian province of Antwerp. The municipality absorbed nearby Postel, and Millegem, in the early 19th century. In 2021, Mol had a total population of 37,021 inhabitants. The total area is 114.19 km^{2}. Mol is a popular holiday resort, with many lakes surrounded by woods. There are two main tourist lakes:

- Zilvermeer, which opened as a Provincial Park in 1959 and offers a white sand beach as well as facilities such as an outdoor playground and an underwater museum for divers.
- Zilverstrand: Originally, it had only an outdoor lake with a white sand beach. Later, a caravan park was built and mid-1990s an indoor swimming pool was created.

Furthermore, there is a Sun Parks holiday centre called "Kempense Meren" with an indoor swimming pool. The museum of Jakob Smits is located in the former vicarage of Mol-Sluis. This displays works of the artist Jakob Smits (1855–1928) and other painters of the Molse School, who were attracted to the area by its rustic views including several windmills (of which only one remains).

In the north-east corner of Mol, near the Dutch border, lies the Norbertine Postel Abbey. Mol is also home to the SCK•CEN Belgian Nuclear Research Centre, the Flemish institute for technological research (VITO) and a European School. The first industries in Mol were the Vieille Montagne company and the explosive factory N.V. La Forcite. In 1872 the Sablières et Carrières Réunies (SCR), now Sibelco, was founded in order to extract the silica sand layers in Mol for industrial applications. The company became the global market leader in this sector with production sites all over the world.

The 15 chapels were built by Pater Helsen in 1815 with 14 co-workers of the region. It is a protected monument.

== Municipality structure ==
The municipality of Mol is divided in different townships respectively named:

- Mol-Centrum
- Mol-Achterbos
- Mol-Donk
- Mol-Ezaart
- Mol-Ginderbuiten
- Mol-Gompel
- Mol-Heidehuizen
- Mol-Millegem
- Mol-Postel
- Mol-Rauw
- Mol-Sluis
- Mol-Wezel

== Places of interest ==
=== Civil architecture ===
- Waterlock along the canal Dessel-Schoten
- Bailey bridge (Postel)
- Mill of Ezaart Ezaart
- Casino (Gompel)

=== Religious architecture ===
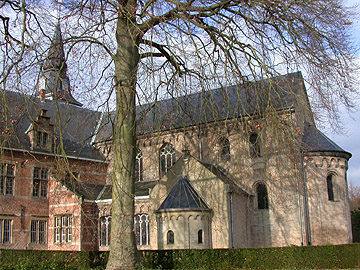
Postel Abbey

- Saint-Peter and Paul church (Mol)
- The Postel Abbey, a 12th-century Premonstratensian abbey
- The 15 chapels in Achterbos
- Saint-Willibrord chapel (Ezaart)
- Lourdes cave (Sluis)
- Saint-Bernard church (Sluis)

=== Museum ===
- Jakob Smitsmuseum in Sluis. Smits was a central artist to the Molse School. The museum's collection contains mostly works of his alongside several other artists of the Molse School.

== Notable born or raised inhabitants ==
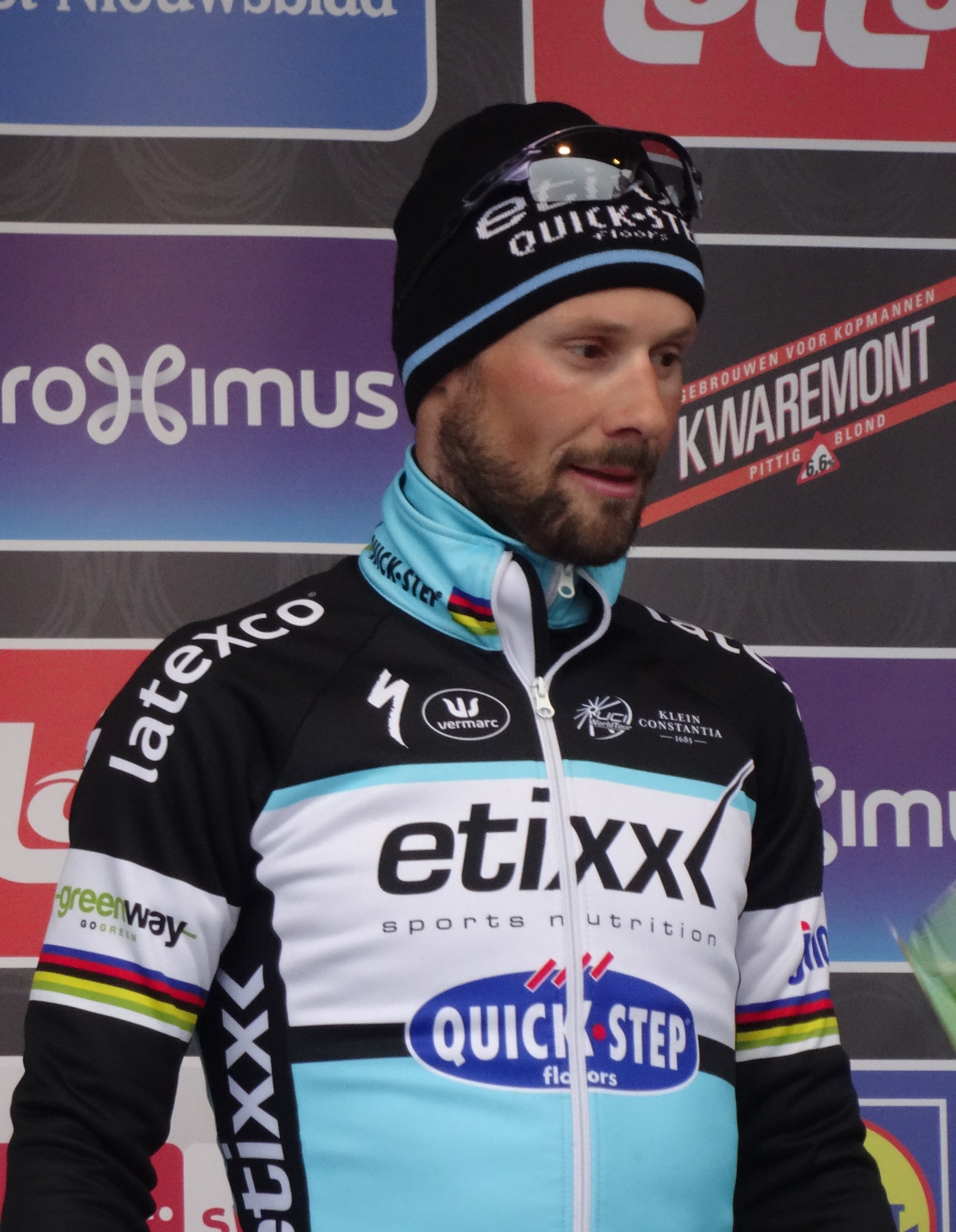
Tom Boonen

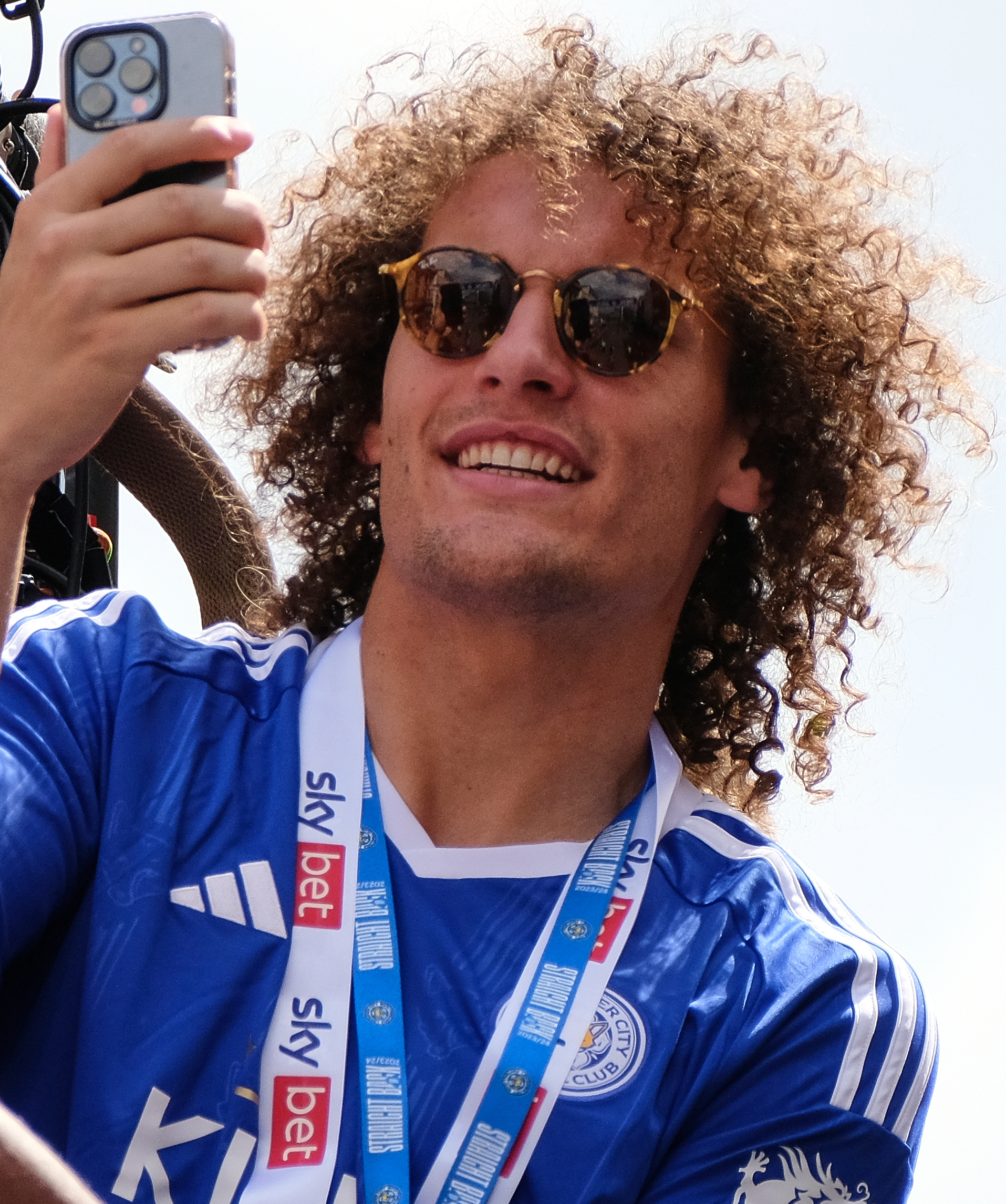
Wout Faes

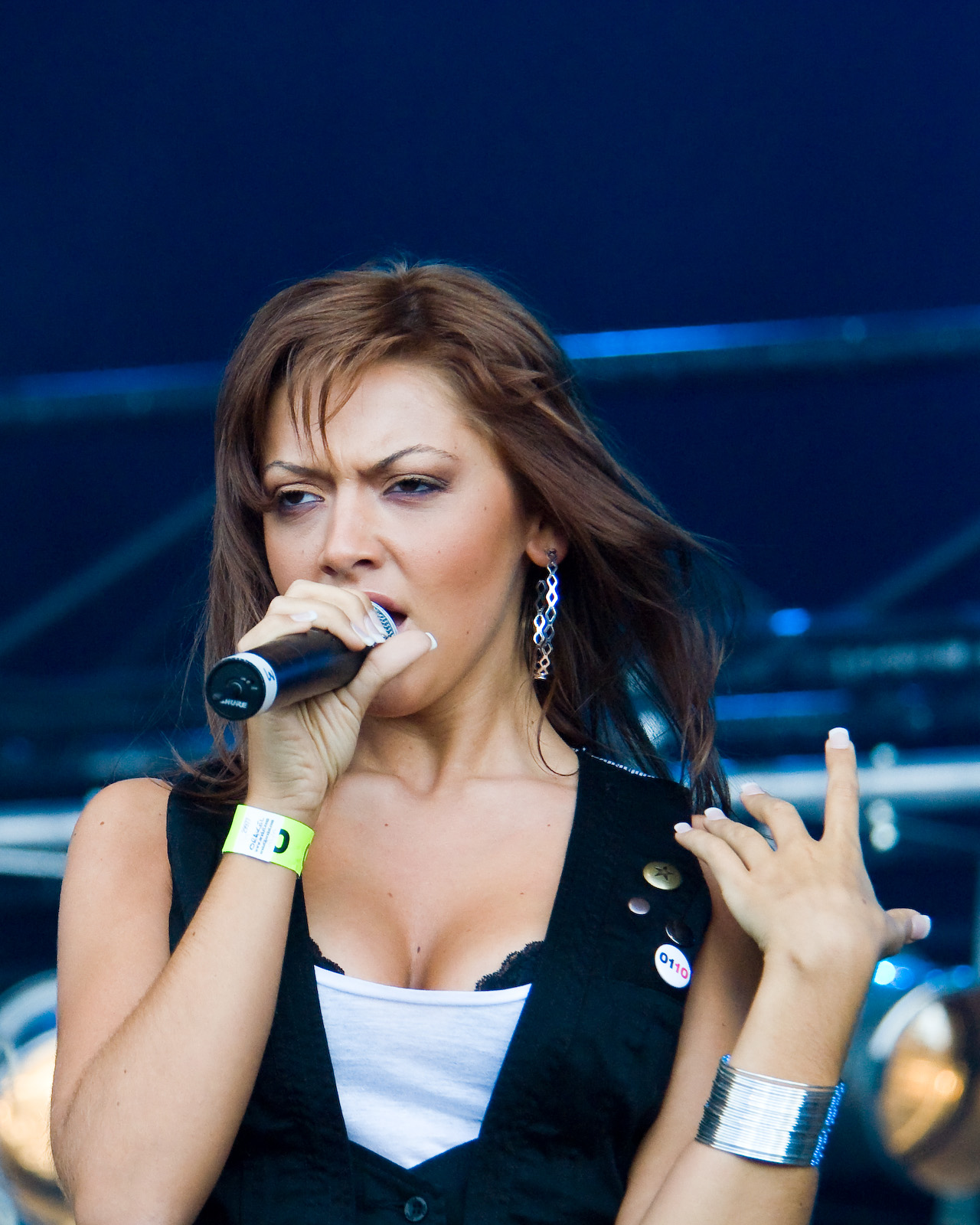
Hadise

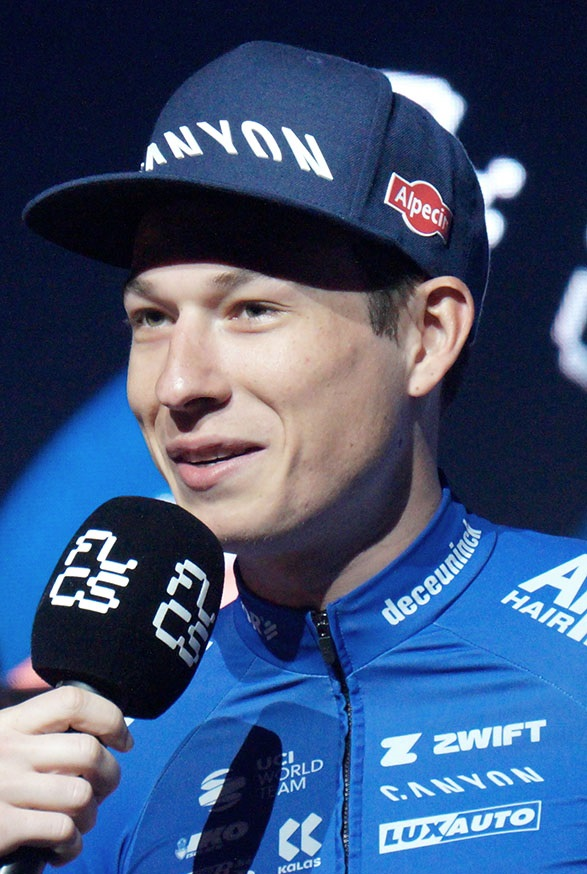
Jasper Philipsen

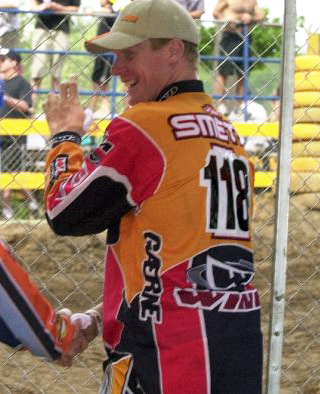
Joël Smets

- Tom Boonen, professional cyclist, 2005 World Road Race Champion (born 1980)
- Evelien Bosmans, actress (born 1989)
- Charles de Broqueville, former prime minister (1860–1940)
- Jacob Buyens van Mol, writer, Dominican friar and priest (?–1604)
- Filip Dewulf, tennis player, semifinalist in the French Open (born 1972)
- Barbara Dex, singer (born 1974)
- Tanja Dexters, Miss Belgium 1998 (born 1977)
- Guy Dufour, footballer (born 1987)
- Edmond van Eetvelde, diplomat, first General Administrator of the Department of Foreign Affairs of the Independent State of the Congo (1852–1925)
- Wout Faes, footballer (born 1998)
- Kirsten Flipkens, tennis player (born 1986)
- Sylvain Geboers, professional motocross racer and race team manager (born 1945)
- Dirk Geukens, professional motocross racer (1963–2020)
- Johan Gielen, professional DJ (born 1968)
- Jo Gilis, professional footballer (born 2000)
- Nele Gilis, professional squash player, European junior champion, world no. 18 on PSA World Tour (born 1996)
- Tinne Gilis, professional squash player, European junior champion, world no. 22 on PSA World Tour (born 1997)
- Hadise, former Pop Idol 2003 and Eurovision 2009 contestant, and now a singer (born 1985)
- Viktor Lazlo, singer and actor (born 1960)
- Yannick Michiels, competitor in orienteering and athletics (born 1991)
- Guy Mortier, journalist and radio and television personality (born 1943)
- Rob Peeters, cyclo-cross rider (born 1985)
- Wilfried Peeters, ex-cyclist, now groupsleader of cyclingteam Quick-Step (born 1964)
- Jasper Philipsen, cyclist (born 1998)
- Tom Saintfiet, football coach (born 1973)
- Joël Smets, former motocross world champion (born 1969)
- Henricus Smeulders, Abbot and pontifical delegate (1826–1892)
- Jakob Smits, painter (1855–1928)
- Ann Van Elsen, Miss Belgium 2002 (born 1979)
- Raymond Van Gestel, footballer (1930–2020)
- Joris Van Hout, footballer (born 1977)
- Zjef Vanuytsel, artist (1945–2015)

== Gallery ==
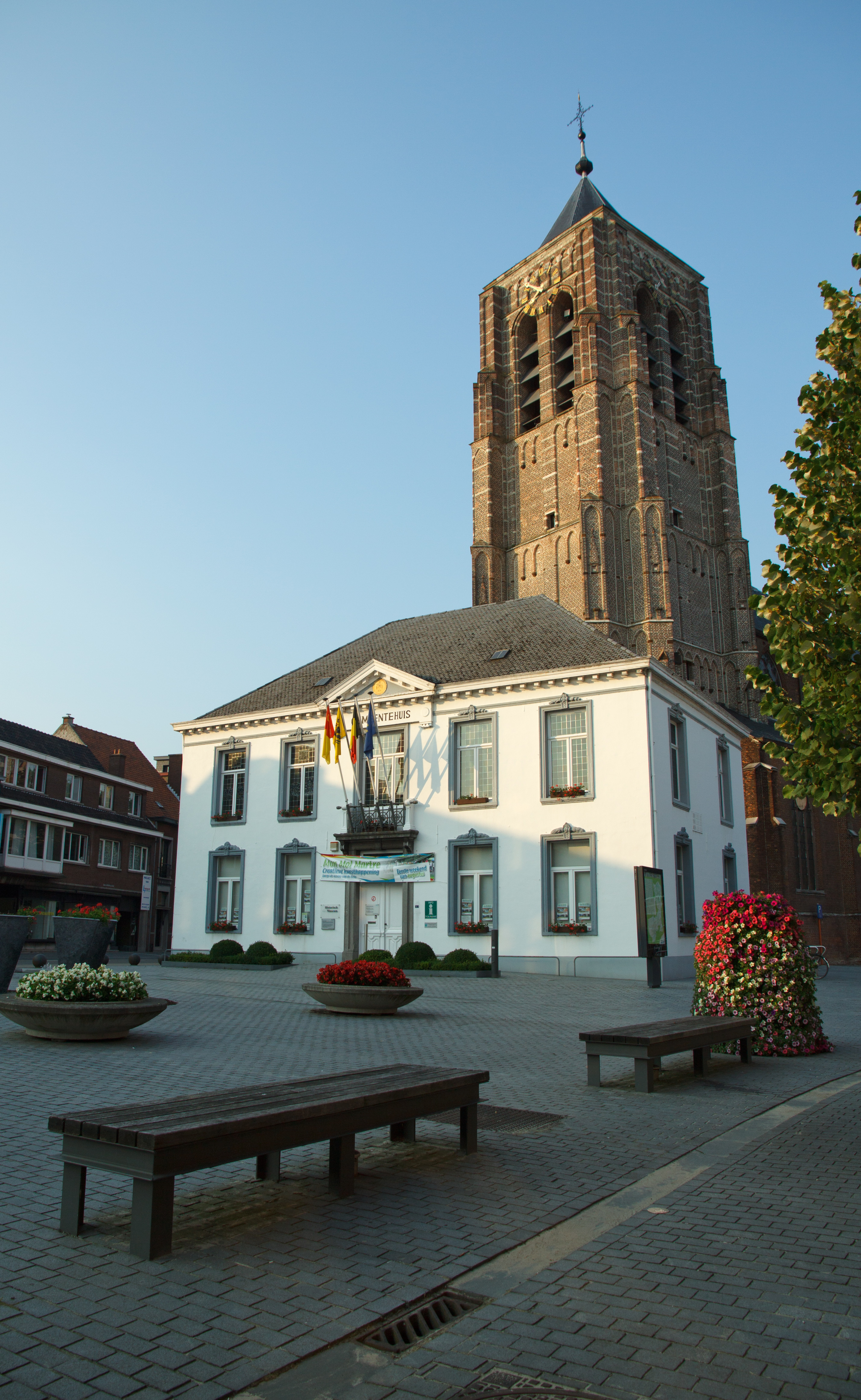
The old town hall and the Sint-Pieter and Pauwelkerk

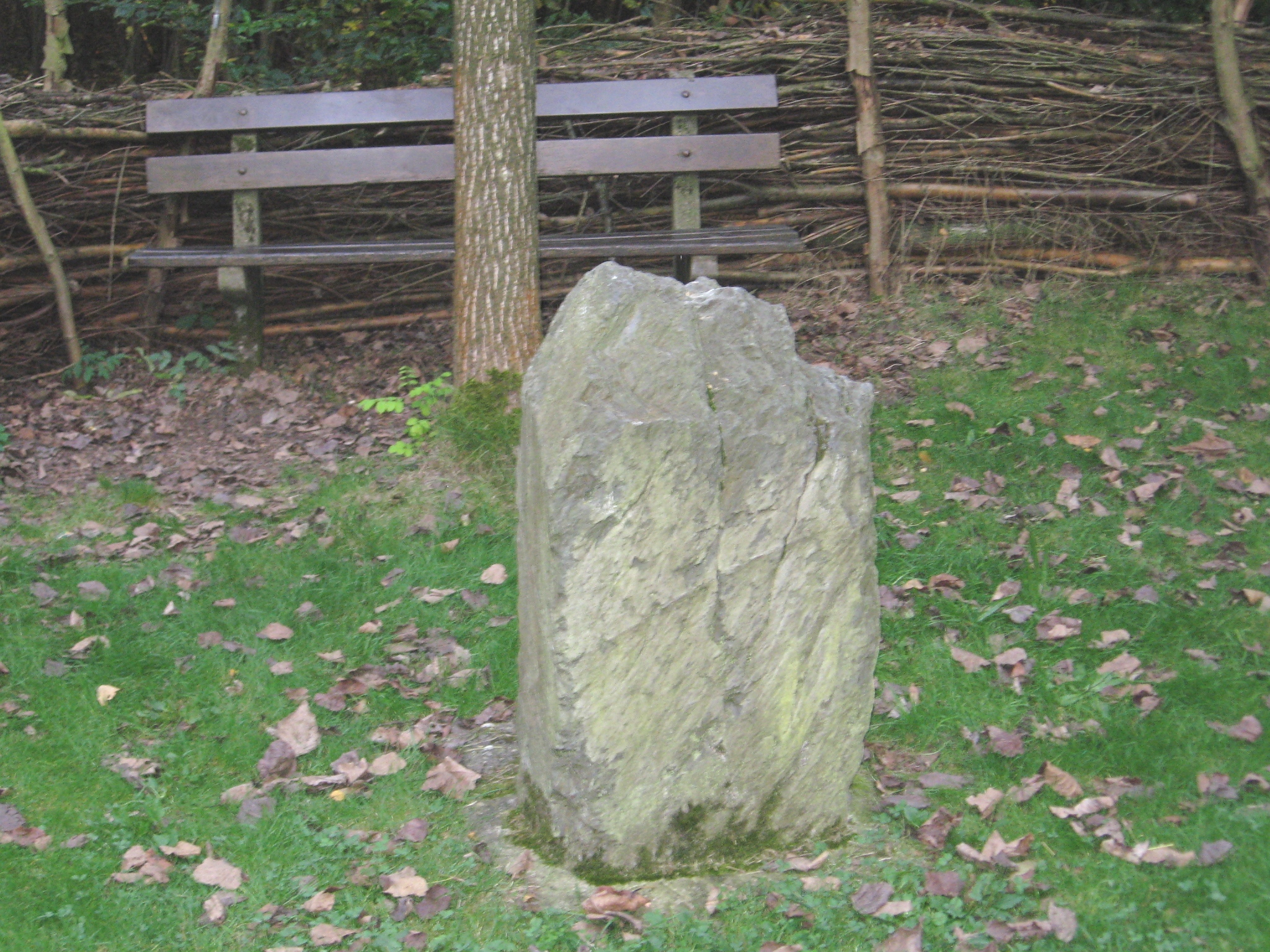
Stone of the Seven Seigniories on the border of the municipalities of Mol and Lommel

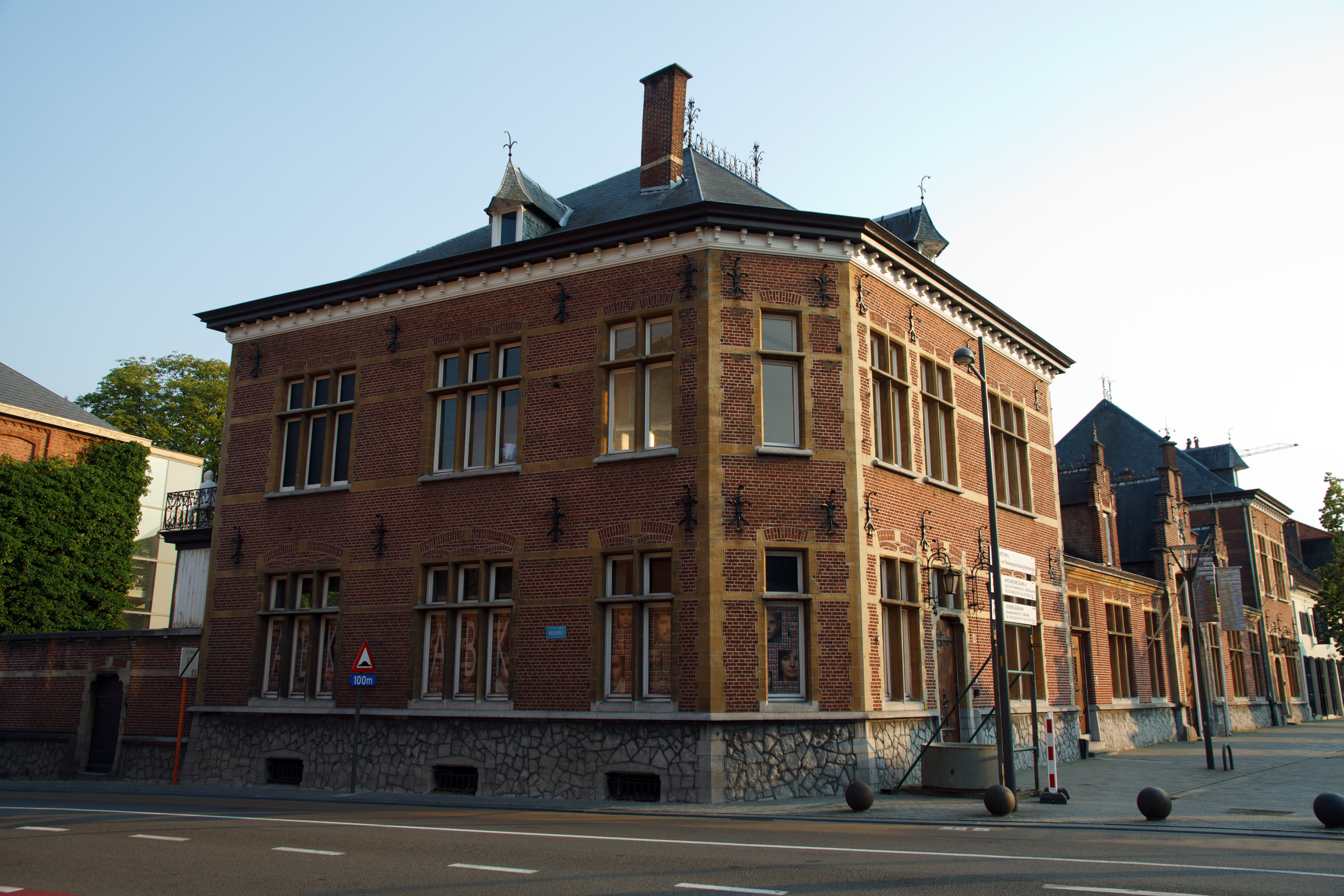
19th-century building currently housing the Academy of Visual Arts

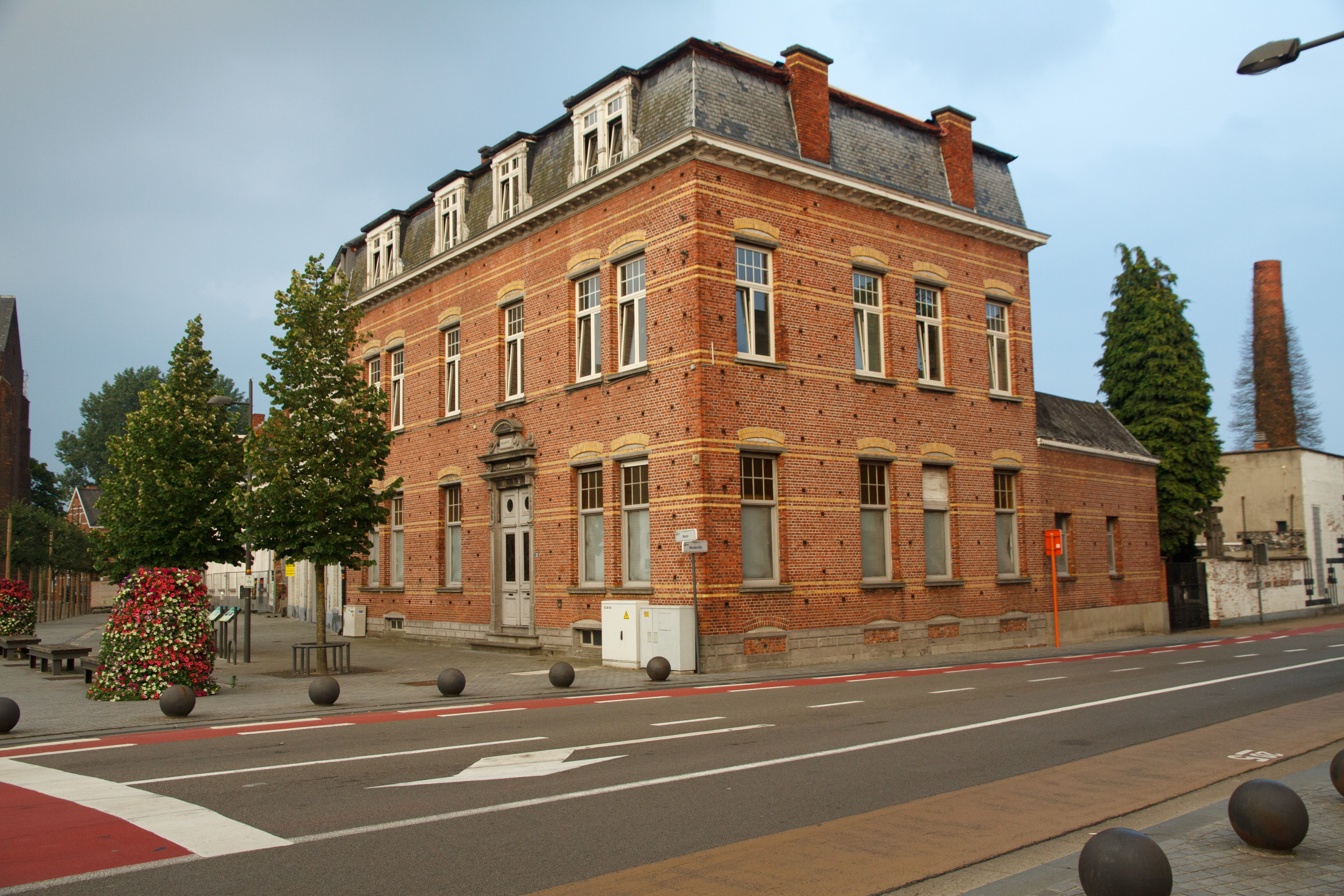
Huis De Clercq on Mol's Markt

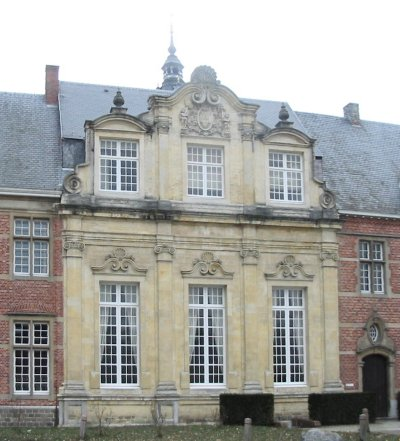
Baroque refectory of Postel Abbey

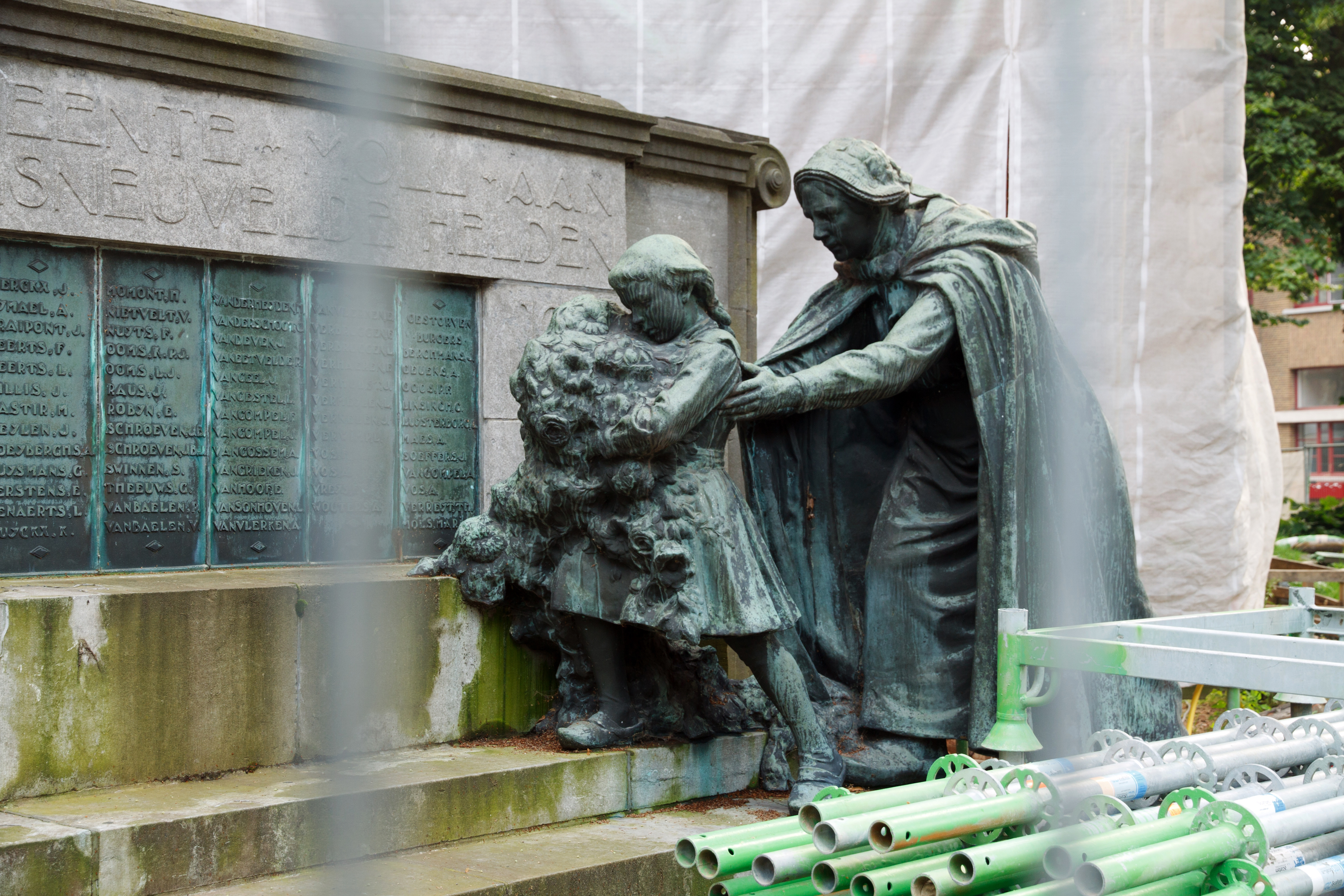
Monument for the victims of the World War I

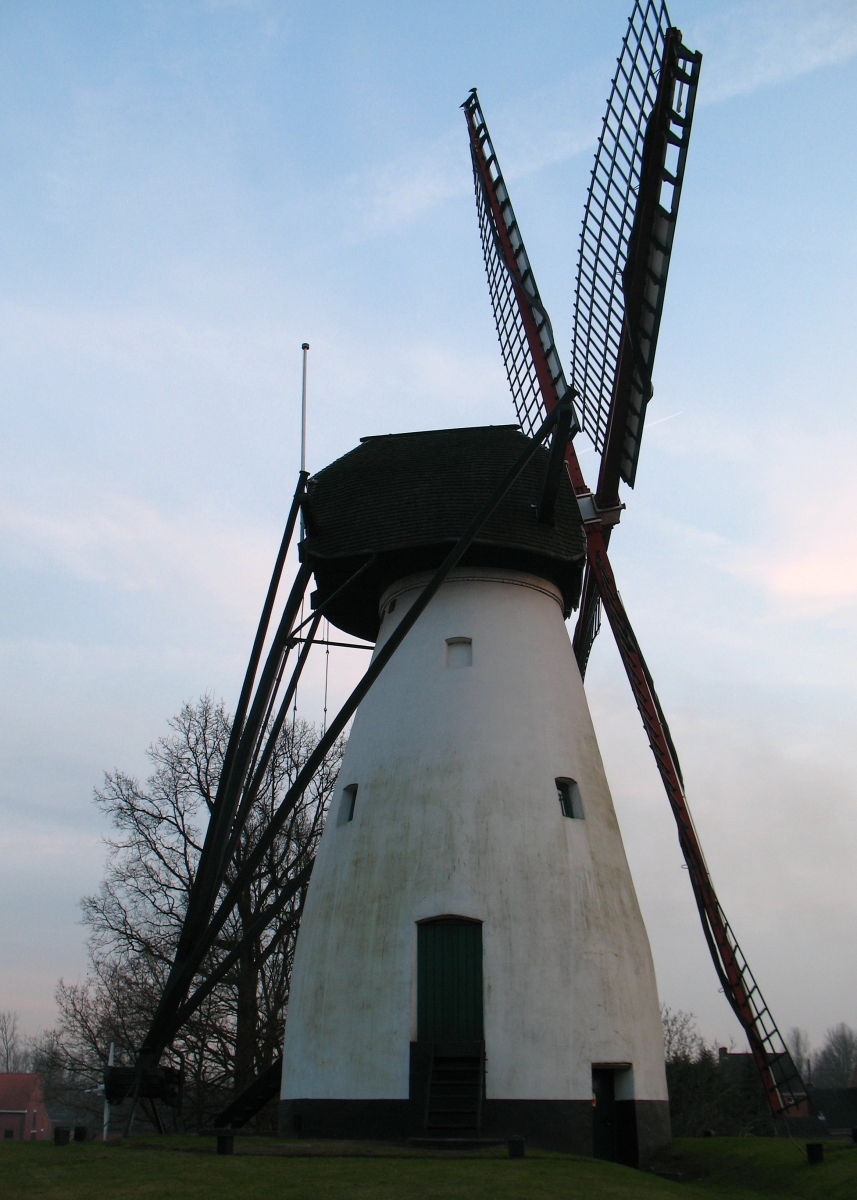
Mill of Ezaart

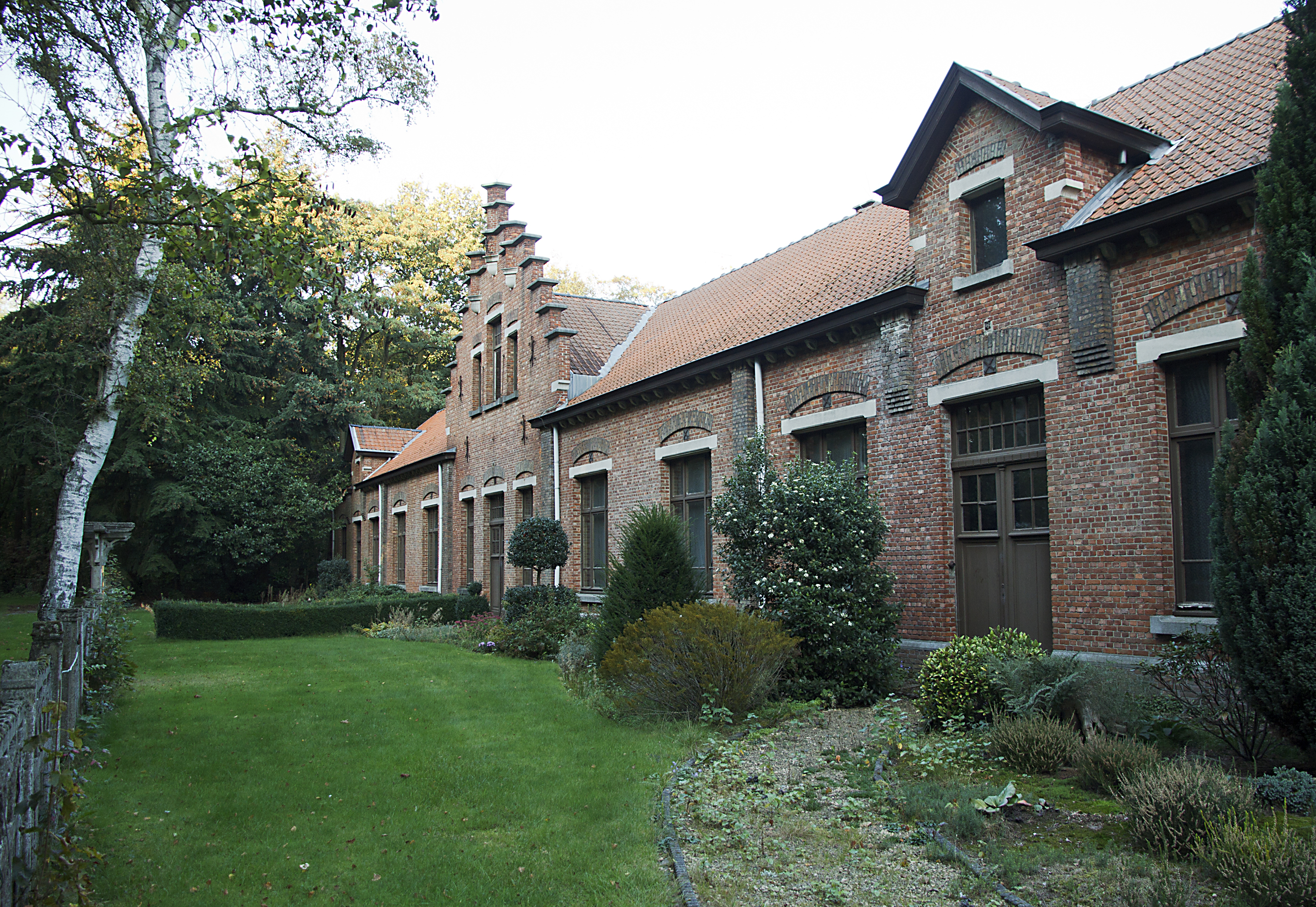
Former factory workers school of the glass factury Glaverbel in Gompel

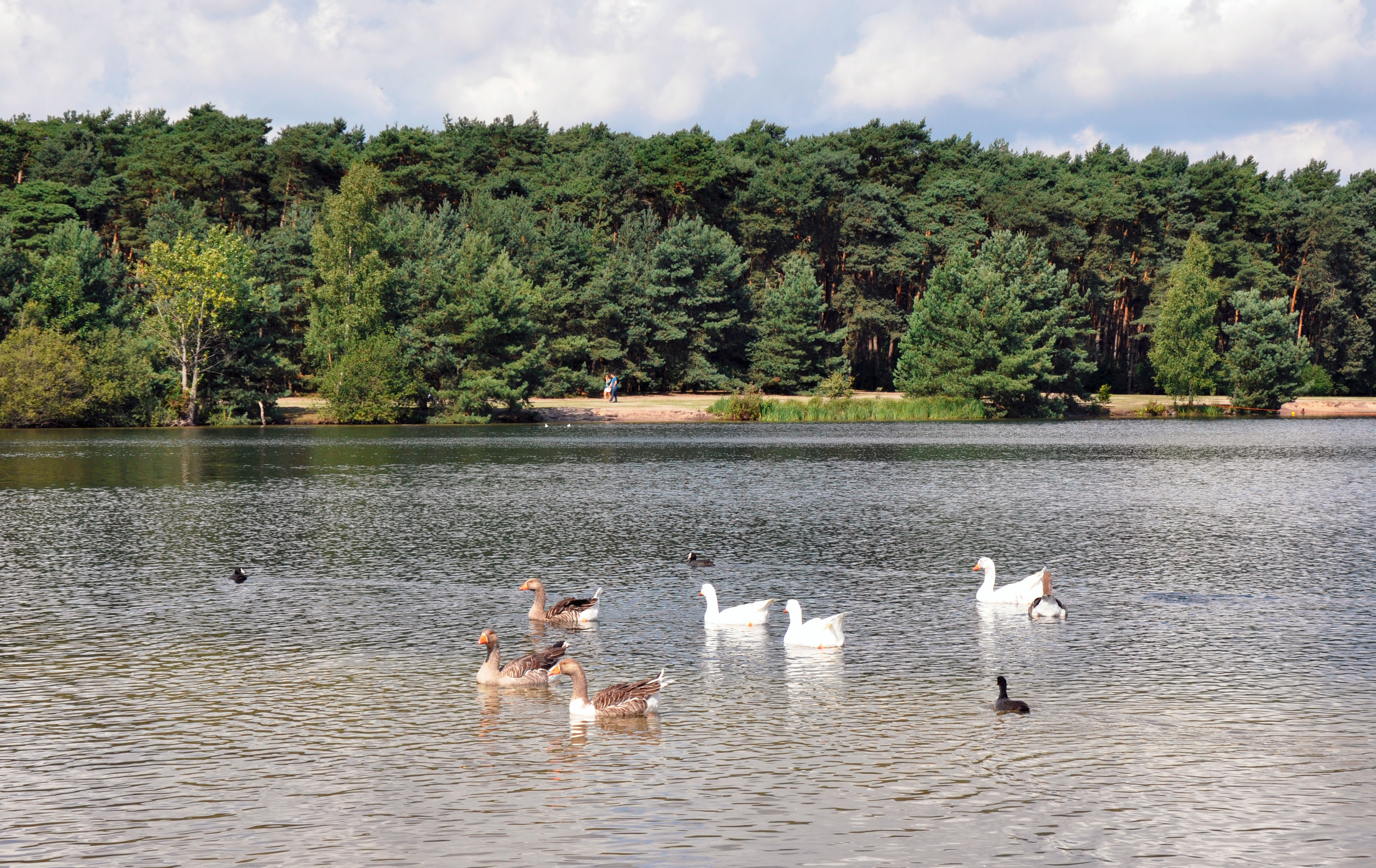
Sunparks resort 'De Kempische Meren - Rauwse Meer'

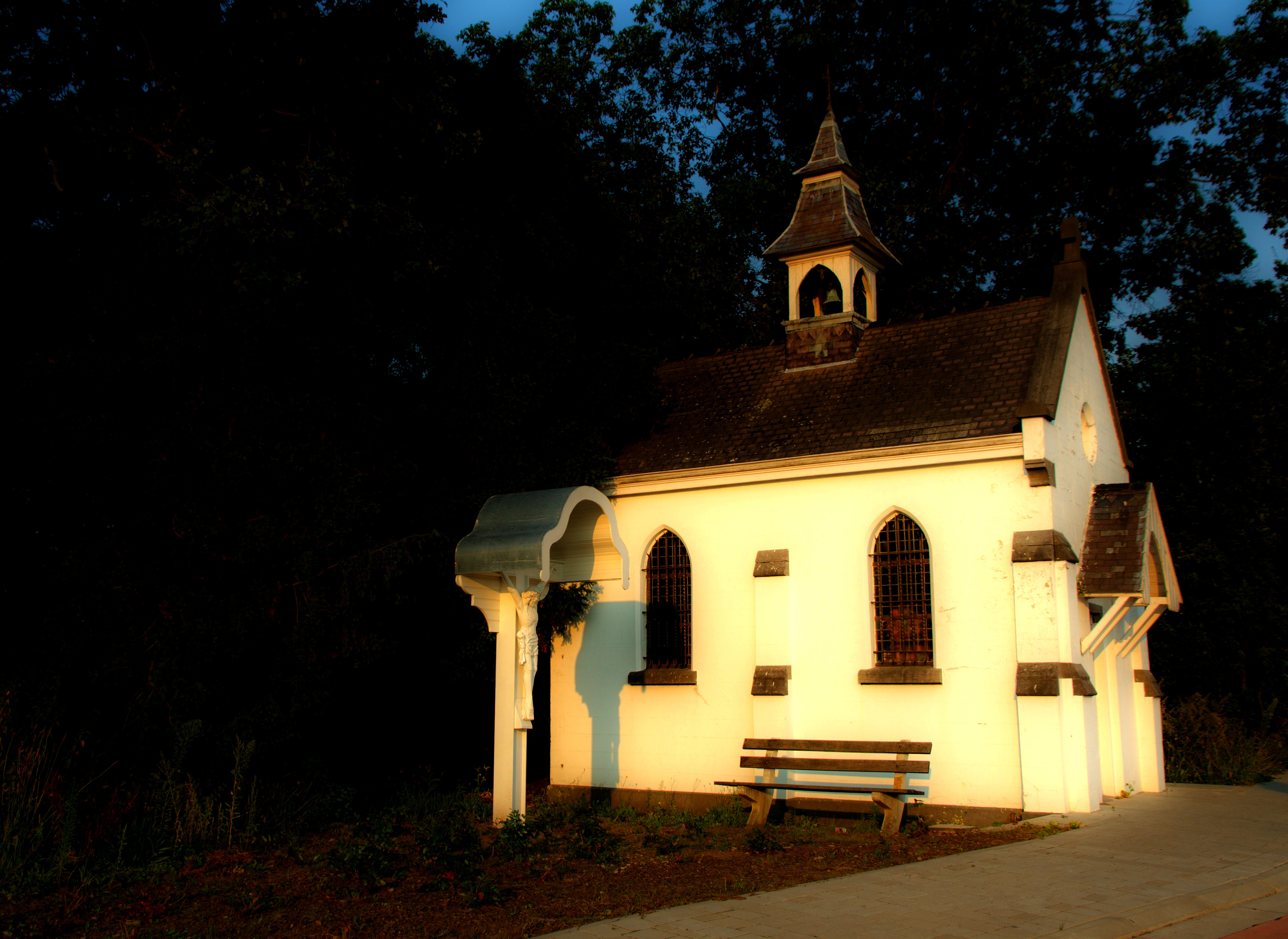
Saint-Anthony chapel and roadside cross

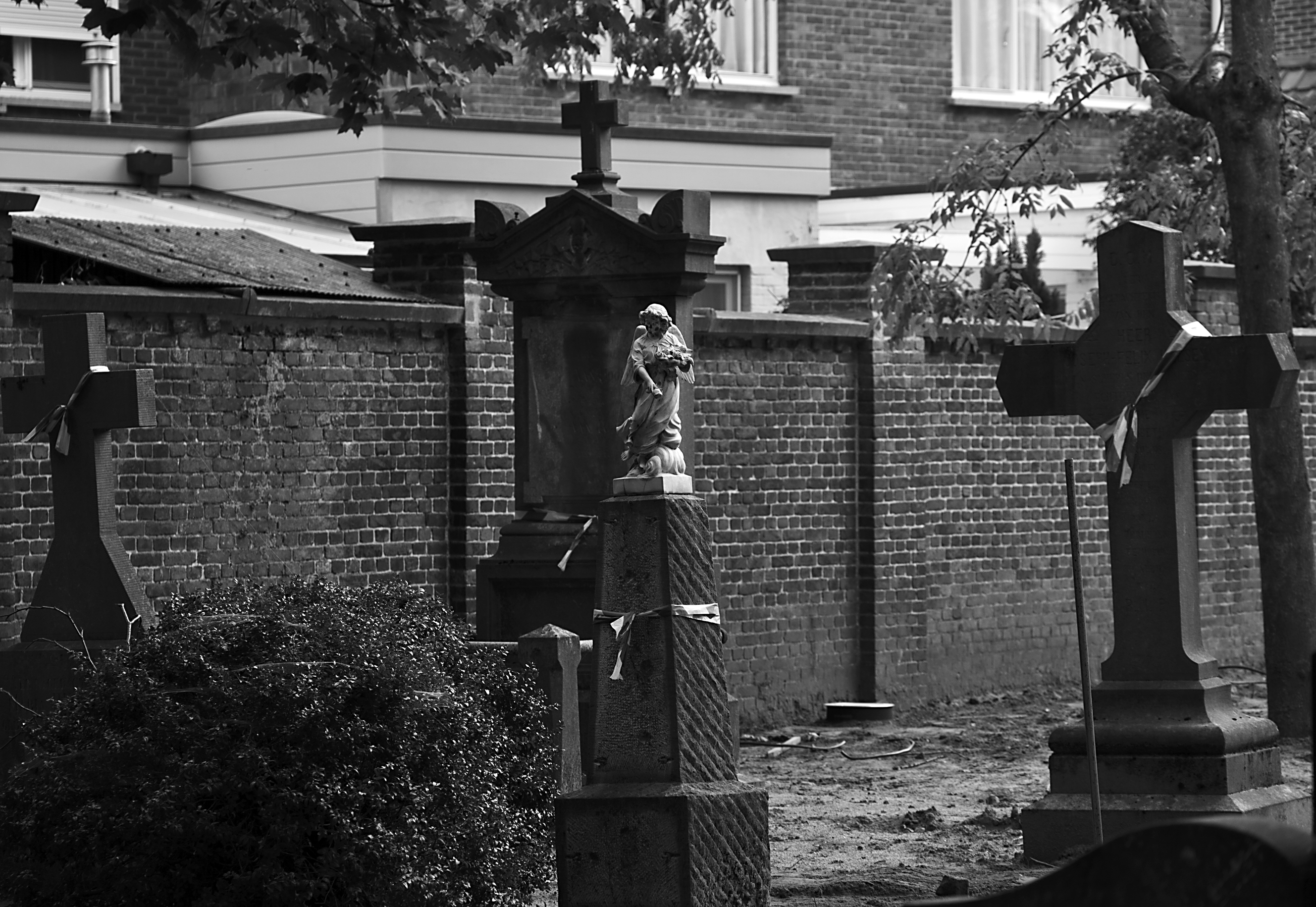
The old enclosed churchyard in the center

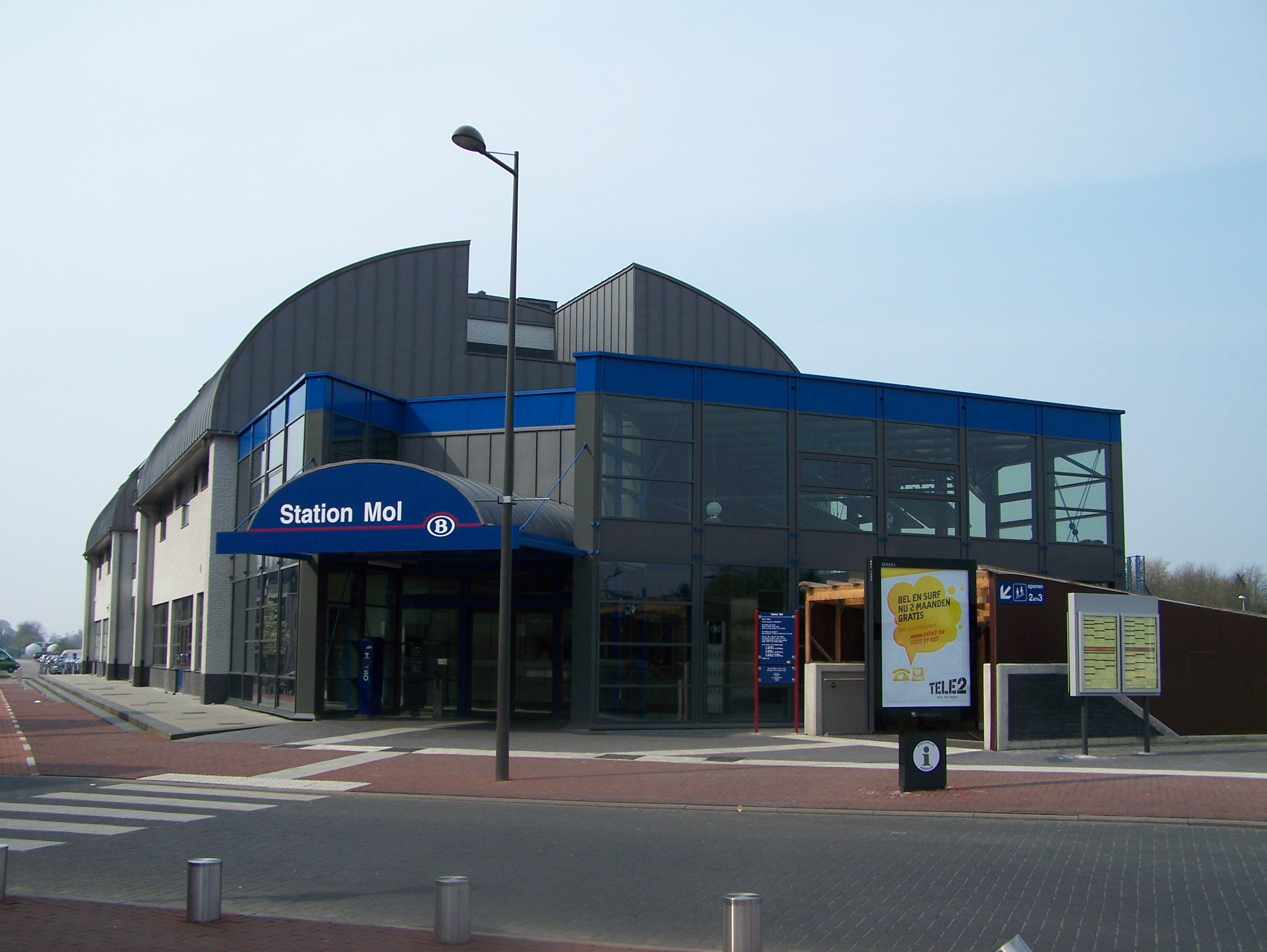
Station Mol
