= Richard M. Capobianco =

American philosopher

Education
- Education: Hofstra University (BA); Boston College (MA, PhD)
- Doctoral advisor: William J. Richardson

Philosophical work
- Era: Contemporary philosophy
- Region: Western philosophy
- School: Continental philosophy, existentialism, hermeneutics, phenomenology
- Institutions: Stonehill College
- Main interests: Martin Heidegger

Richard M. Capobianco is an American philosophy professor and a leading scholar of the 20th-century German philosopher Martin Heidegger. His four books, Engaging Heidegger, Heidegger's Way of Being, Heidegger's Being: The Shimmering Unfolding, and In Heidegger's Vineyard: Reflections and Mystical Vignettes, have led the way to a renewed appreciation of Heidegger's central matter of "being," especially in the later work.

== Education and career ==
Capobianco received a B.A. in economics and philosophy from Hofstra University in 1979. He was inducted into Phi Beta Kappa in 1978. He is currently a professor of philosophy at Stonehill College in North Easton, Massachusetts. He earned his M.A. and Ph.D. in philosophy at Boston College, where his principal teacher and mentor was the preeminent Heidegger commentator William J. Richardson, who also wrote the foreword to his book Engaging Heidegger. Capobianco teaches courses on Existentialism, Hermeneutics, American Philosophy, and Aesthetics, and he has received several awards for teaching excellence, including a national recognition from the Princeton Review.

== Selected works ==
- Engaging Heidegger, University of Toronto Press, 2010.
- Heidegger's Way of Being, University of Toronto Press, 2014.
- Heidegger's Being: The Shimmering Unfolding, University of Toronto Press, 2022
- Heidegger and the Holy, ed. Richard Capobianco, Rowman & Littlefield, 2022
- In Heidegger's Vineyard: Reflections and Mystical Vignettes, Angelico Press, 2024
- La Via del Ser de Heidegger, Escolar Editor, Madrid, 2020 (Spanish translation)
- La Via dell'Essere di Heidegger, Orthotes Editrice, 2023 (Italian translation)
- Heideggerova Cesta Bytia, Safarik Press, Kosice, 2018 (Slovak translation)
