= David R. Morrow =

American philosopher

- Awards: Alfred P. Sloan Foundation grant

Education
- Education: CUNY Graduate Center (PhD), University of Chicago (MA), Johns Hopkins University (BA)
- Thesis: Of the Terrible Doubt of Appearances: An Essay in Moral Epistemology (2009)
- Doctoral advisor: Catherine Wilson

Philosophical work
- Era: 21st-century philosophy
- Region: Western philosophy
- Institutions: George Mason University, American University
- Main interests: climate policy, moral philosophy
- Website: https://www.davidmorrow.net/

David R. Morrow is an American philosopher and the Director of Research for the Institute for Carbon Removal Law and Policy and the Forum for Climate Engineering Assessment at American University. He is also a Research Fellow in the Institute for Philosophy & Public Policy at George Mason University. Morrow is known for his works on climate policy and ethics.

== Early life an education ==
Morrow received a master of arts in public policy from the Harris School of Public Policy at the University of Chicago and a Ph.D. philosophy from the Graduate Center of the City University of New York.

== Books ==
- Morrow, D.R. 2019. Values in Climate Policy. London: Rowman & Littlefield International.
- Morrow, D.R. & A. Weston. 2019. A Workbook for Arguments: A Complete Course in Critical Thinking, 3rd edition. Indianapolis: Hackett. (First edition, 2012)
- Melchert, N. & D.R. Morrow. 2018. The Great Conversation: A Historical Introduction to Philosophy, 8th edition. New York: Oxford University Press.
- Morrow, D.R. 2018. Moral Reasoning: A Text and Reader on Ethics and Contemporary Moral Issues. New York: Oxford University Press.
- Morrow, D.R. 2017. Giving Reasons: An Extremely Short Introduction to Critical Thinking. Hackett.
