= Institute of Philosophy, KU Leuven =

Coordinates: 50.87599°N 4.70667°E

The Institute of Philosophy (Dutch: Hoger Instituut voor Wijsbegeerte) is the faculty of philosophy at the KU Leuven in the Belgian city of Leuven. It was founded in 1968 when the Institut supérieur de Philosophie - Hoger Instituut voor Wijsbegeerte of the Catholic University of Leuven (1835–1968) was split into a Dutch-speaking entity and a French-speaking entity. Its main buildings are located in the center of Leuven at the Kardinaal Mercier Square, named for the founder of the original institute.

== History ==
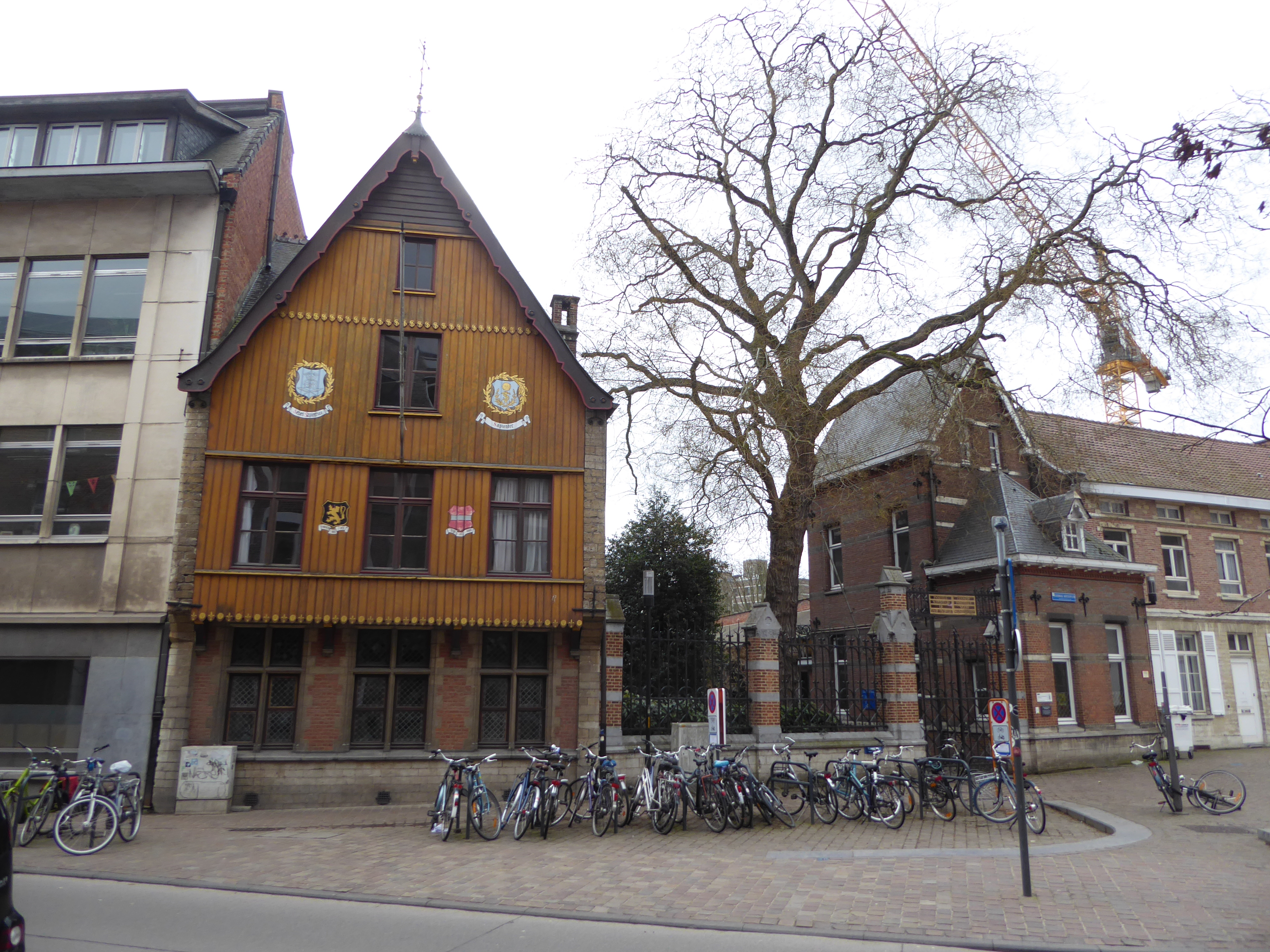
Hoger Instituut voor Wijsbegeerte, Kardinaal Mercierplein, Leuven

The Institut supérieur de Philosophie was founded by Cardinal Mercier on 8 November 1889 with the intent to be a beacon of Neo-Thomist philosophy, although Philosophy and Theology had been taught at the universities of Leuven since 1425. The institute initially taught programs in French and started courses in Dutch in 1933. After the language split of 1968, the Hoger Instituut voor Wijsbegeerte became part of the newly independent Katholieke Universiteit te Leuven, offering programmes in Dutch with little and at times no content taught in French, while the French-speaking Institut supérieur de Philosophie of the Université catholique de Louvain continued in the new city of Louvain-la-Neuve. In 1993, the institute became the faculty of philosophy.

== Programs offered ==
The institute offers both taught and research degrees (B.A., M.A., MPhil and PhD) as well as pre-doc and post-doc programs, both in Dutch and English. Students can take classes in both languages if desired.

== Departments ==
- Cultural Philosophy
- Ethics, Social and Political Philosophy
- Logic and Philosophy of Science
- Metaphysics and Modern Philosophy
- Ancient, Medieval and Renaissance Philosophy
- Phenomenology

== Husserl Archives Leuven ==
The Institute, together with its French-speaking counterpart in Louvain-la-Neuve, are well known as the home of the Husserl Archives, the research center responsible for the publication of the philosophical work of Edmund Husserl. After the death of the founder of the phenomenological movement, fearing for the destruction of his Nachlass at the hands of the Nazis, Father Herman Van Breda (Franciscan), PhD student at the institute, saved Husserl's manuscripts, library and widow and smuggled them to Leuven via diplomatic channels.

== Research and publications ==
The Institute publishes a Dutch-language philosophy journal, called the Tijdschrift voor Filosofie, an interdisciplinary journal in both Dutch: Ethische Perspectieven and English: Ethical Perspectives and the Bibliographical Directory of Philosophy (published jointly with the UCLouvain's Institut supérieur de Philosophie). It also organizes several major publication efforts, including the Husserliana (Husserl-Archives), the Aristoteles Latinus (De Wulf-Mansion centre), the Latin editions of Aristotle's works known to the medieval philosophers.

== Numbers ==
- Ranks 24th in the QS World Philosophy Rankings (2014)
- More than 30 lecturers and professors
- 80 researchers in 5 departments
- more than 100 graduate students
- Circa 750 students (of which 50% international students)

== Renowned emeriti ==
- Armand Thiéry (1868–1955)
- Samuel IJsseling (1932–2015)
- Alphonse De Waelhens (1911–1981)
- Herman Parret
- André Léonard
- Herman Van Rompuy
- Rudolf Bernet
- William Desmond

== Guest researchers and lecturers ==
Internationally renowned professors who have lectured at the institute:

- Étienne Gilson
- Jacques Lacan
- Paul Ricœur
- Emmanuel Levinas
- Maurice Merleau-Ponty
- Jan Patočka
- Jacques Derrida
- Jean-François Lyotard
- Charles Hartshorne
- Michel Foucault
- Karl Popper
- John Searle
- P. F. Strawson
- Umberto Eco
- Roger Scruton
- Donald Davidson
- Martha Nussbaum
- Richard Rorty
- Bernard Williams
- Ian Hacking
- John Milbank
- Don Cupitt

== Notable alumni ==
- Hans Lindahl, professor and former student
- Bruce Ellis Benson, professor, Wheaton College, US
- Babette Babich (professor), professor of philosophy at Fordham University
- Joseph J. Kockelmans, professor, Pennsylvania State University, US
- Jeb Bishop, musician (BA 1985)

== See also ==
- Joseph Maréchal
- Split of the Catholic University of Leuven
- Tijdschrift voor Filosofie 'Journal of Philosophy' (before 1961 spelt Tijdschrift voor Philosophie)
- Erasmus
