= Catherine Wilson (philosopher) =

American philosopher (born 1951)

- Born: 28 March 1951 (age 75)
- Awards: Leibniz Society of America Essay Prize

Education
- Thesis: Visual Impressions and Visual Experience (1977)
- Doctoral advisor: George Pitcher

Philosophical work
- Era: 21st-century philosophy
- Region: Western philosophy
- Doctoral students: David R. Morrow

Catherine Warren Wilson FRSC (born 28 March 1951) is a British/American/Canadian philosopher. Wilson taught at the University of Oregon, University of Alberta, University of British Columbia, City College of NYC, University of Aberdeen and was formerly Anniversary Professor at the University of York. From 2009 to 2012, she served as the Regius Professor of Moral Philosophy at the University of Aberdeen. She is known for her interdisciplinary studies of visuality, moral psychology and aesthetics, and especially early microscopy and Epicurean atomism and materialism.

== Biography ==
Wilson was born in New York into a family of scientists and mathematicians. She attended a Quaker boarding school in Westtown, Pennsylvania, and attended Vassar College in Poughkeepsie, New York, before transferring to Yale University in 1969. She took a B.Phil. in philosophy with Gareth Evans and Peter Seuren at Oxford in 1974 and a Ph.D. in philosophy at Princeton in 1977. After holding academic posts in the US and Canada, and fellowships at Cambridge University and in Konstanz and Berlin, she moved to the UK in 2009.

She was Anniversary Professor of Philosophy at the University of York (2012–2018). Before that, she was Regius Professor of Moral Philosophy at the University of Aberdeen (2009–2012). Wilson is a Fellow of the Royal Society of Canada and a former president of Mind Association of Great Britain.

Her podcasts have included:

- Shermer, Michael (24 December 2019). "Catherine Wilson – How to Be an Epicurean: The Ancient Art of Living Well". Science Salon (Podcast). Skeptic Magazine.
- Wright, Robert (8 December 2019). "How to Be an Epicurean". MeaningofLife.tv (Podcast). Bloggingheads.tv.

== Publications ==
=== Books ===
- How to be an Epicurean, New York: Basic Books, 2019, published in the UK as The Pleasure Principle.
- Metaethics from a First-Person Standpoint, London, Open Book, 2016.
- A Very Short Introduction to Epicureanism, Oxford, Oxford University Press, 2015.
- Epicureanism at the Origins of Modernity. Oxford, Clarendon, 2008; paperback 2010.
- Moral Animals: Ideals and Constraints in Moral Theory. Oxford, Clarendon, 2004, 2nd ed. paperback, 2007.
- Descartes's Meditations: An Introduction. Cambridge, Cambridge University Press, 2003.
- The Invisible World: Early Modern Philosophy and the Invention of the Microscope. Princeton University Press, 1995, 2nd ed. paperback, 1997; reprinted 2009.
- Leibniz's Metaphysics: A Historical and Comparative Study. Princeton University Press/Manchester University Press, 1989, repr. 2015.

=== Articles ===
- 'Expanding Consciousness' (with Lars Chittka) American Scientist 107, 364–9.
- 'What (else) was behind the Newtonian Rejection of Hypotheses? in Experiment, Speculation, and Religion in Early Modern Philosophy, ed. Peter Anstey and Alberto Vanzo, Routledge, 2019
- 'Evolution and Ethics: An Overview' in Richard Joyce, ed. The Routledge Handbook of Evolution and Philosophy, Routledge, 2017, Ch. 21.
- 'Another Darwinian Aesthetics,' Journal of Aesthetics and Art Criticism 74:3 (2016) pp. 237–252
- 'The Doors of Perception and the Artist Within,' Proceedings of the Aristotelian Society Supplementary Volume, 89 (2015) pp. 1–19.
- 'Kant and the Speculative Sciences of Origins.' In The Problem of Animal Generation in the 17th and 18th Centuries, ed. Justin E.H. Smith, Cambridge University Press, 2005, pp. 375–401.
- 'The Role of a Merit Principle in Distributive Justice.' Journal of Ethics 7 (2003), pp. 1–38.
