= Jean Ladrière =

Belgian logician and philosopher (1921–2007)

Jean Ladrière (September 7, 1921 – November 26, 2007) was a Belgian logician and philosopher, born in Nivelles. He was professor at the University of Louvain (UCLouvain) from 1959 to 1986, where he was chair of the Higher Institute of Philosophy from 1977 to 1985.

The overall project animating his work (650 scientific articles, partially assembled into a dozen volumes) was to develop, in his words, "a report that is not a simple confrontation, but a justified report to the both reflected and lived between the (Christian) faith and reason," especially scientific and philosophical reason.

He died in Ottignies-Louvain-la-Neuve.
