= Herman Van Breda =

Herman Leo Van Breda (born Leo Marie Karel; 28 February 1911, in Lier – 3 March 1974, in Leuven) was a Belgian Franciscan friar, philosopher and founder of the Husserl Archives at the Higher Institute of Philosophy of the Catholic University of Leuven in Belgium.

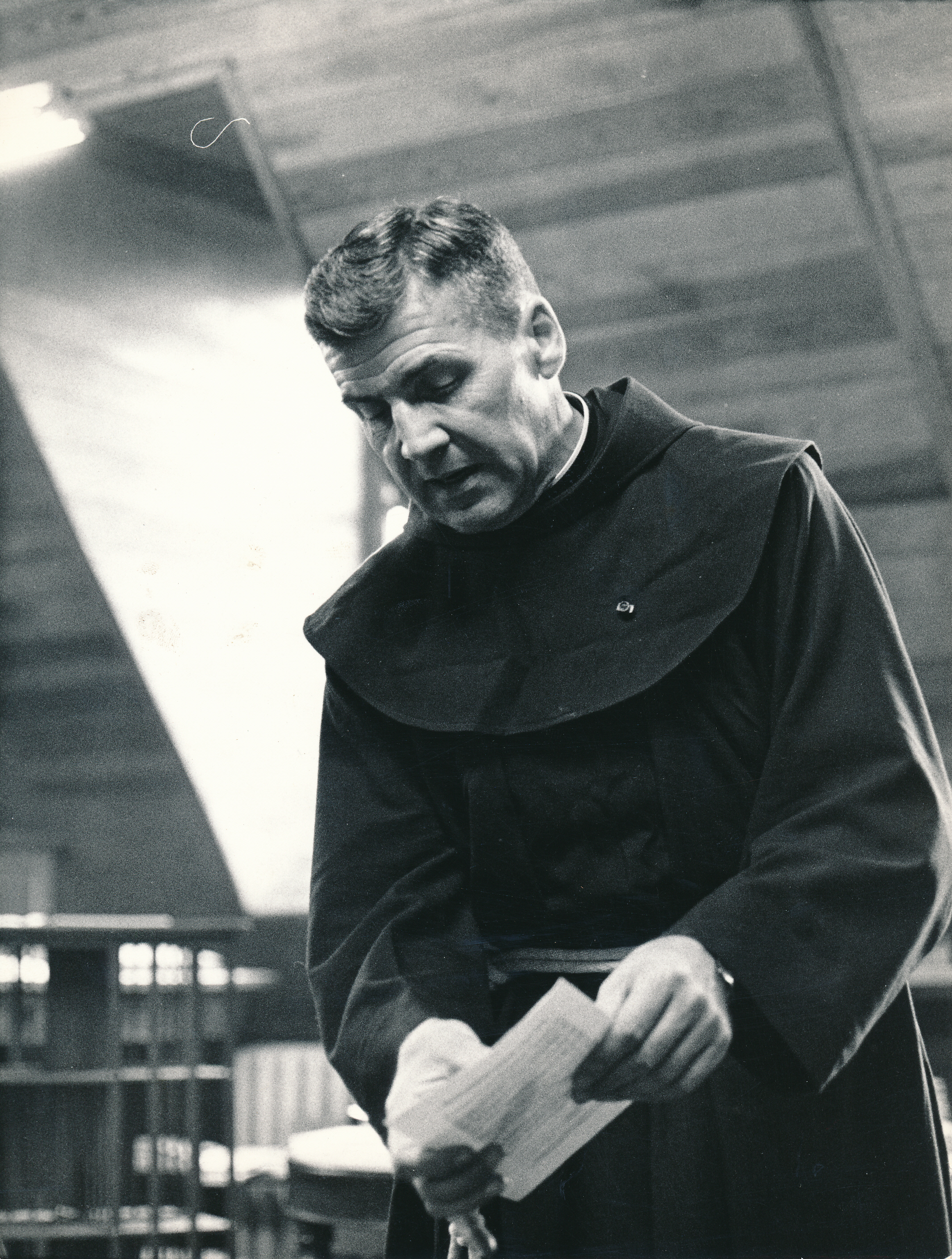
Image of Herman Van Breda

On 19 August 1934, he was ordained as a Catholic priest and in 1936 he started studying philosophy at the Catholic University of Leuven, where he obtained a PhD degree in 1941 with a dissertation on the phenomenology of Edmund Husserl. Later he became a professor at the Catholic University of Leuven, where he stayed until his death in 1974.

== Husserl archives ==
Van Breda saved the extensive writings and manuscripts of Edmund Husserl from destruction by the Nazis.

For the preparation of his PhD thesis he traveled to Freiburg, Germany in 1938, where he found, in the legacy of Edmund Husserl (1859–1938), more than 40,000 Gabelsberger stenography manuscripts and his complete research library. The political situation in Germany at that time convinced him of the necessity to transport these manuscripts and Husserl's private library to Leuven. In order to smuggle the documents out of Nazi Germany, he needed the support not only of the rector of the Catholic University of Leuven, but also of the Belgian government. The Belgian Prime Minister at that time, Paul-Henri Spaak, allowed van Breda to bring the documents from Freiburg to the Belgian embassy in Berlin and diplomatic couriers to bring them to Leuven in Belgium.

Van Breda also was able to convince Husserl's former assistants, Eugen Fink and Ludwig Landgrebe, to collaborate on the editing of these documents in Leuven. At the beginning of World War II the documents were being kept in the university library in Leuven, which burned to ashes on 17 May 1940. Fortunately, one week before the fire, Van Breda decided to bring the documents to the Higher Institute of Philosophy.

In 1943 the documents were, for safety, distributed over different locations in Leuven, including a shelter in the cellar of the Institute of Philosophy and the Abbey of Postel. After the war they were brought back to the Institute of Philosophy, where they form the basis for the Husserliana, the complete works of Edmund Husserl.

For his work on spreading Husserl's work he was awarded an honoris causa doctorate from the Albert Ludwigs University of Freiburg.

== See also ==
- Jacques Taminiaux
