= Babette Babich =

American philosopher (born 1956)

Babette Babich (born 14 November 1956, New York City) is an American philosopher who writes from a continental perspective on aesthetics, philosophy of science, especially Nietzsche's, and technology, especially Martin Heidegger's and Günther Anders, in addition to critical and cultural theory.

== Education ==
Babich received her B.A. in philosophy (with departmental honors) and biology from Stony Brook University in 1980 and her Ph.D. in philosophy from Boston College in 1987.

== Work ==
Including research work at the Université Catholique de Louvain (Belgium), Université François-Rabelais, Tours (France), Freie Universität Berlin and Universität Tübingen (Germany), Babich holds a doctoral degree from Boston College. She taught at Denison University and Marquette University before her current position at Fordham University in New York City in addition to an honorary appointment as Visiting Professor of Theology, Religion and Philosophy, University of Winchester, England, she has also taught, as visiting professor, most recently, at the Humboldt University, Berlin as well as at the Universität Tübingen, The University at Stony Brook, Georgetown University, the School of Visual Arts in Chelsea (NYC), University of California at San Diego, and the Juilliard School.

In addition to philosophy of science inspired by Nietzsche, Paul Feyerabend, Ludwik Fleck, etc., Babich writes on AI, philosophy of technology as well as philosophy of art, including philosophy of music, museum culture and poetics, film, television, and digital media, as well as life-size bronzes in antiquity (Greek sculpture), and the stylistic (and political) difference between analytic and continental philosophy.

Over the years, Babich has contributed to contemporary debates in philosophy of science as well as the history of science and sociology of science and has written on ecology, especially aether (she is part of Aaron Michael Smith and Jordan Kokot's multimedia art project, field|guide) and animal philosophy.

In 1995, she founded the journal New Nietzsche Studies, echoing the title of the 1974 book, The New Nietzsche, the continentally minded collection edited by David Blair Allison (1944-2016).

== Bibliography ==
=== Books ===
- Günther Anders’ Philosophy of Technology: From Phenomenology to Critical Theory. London: Bloomsbury, 2022.
- Nietzsches Plastik. Ästhetische Phänomenologie im Spiegel des Lebens. London/Berlin: Peter Lang, 2021.
- Nietzsches Antike. Beiträge zur Altphilologie und Musik. Berlin: Academia, 2020.
- The Hallelujah Effect. Philosophical Reflections on Music, Performance Practice and Technology. Routledge: 2016. [2013]
- Un politique brisé. Le souci d'autrui, l'humanisme, et les juifs chez Heidegger. Paris: L'Harmattan, 2016.
- La fin de la pensée? Philosophie analytique contre philosophie continentale. Paris: L'Harmattan, 2012.
- Nietzsches Wissenschaftsphilosophie. »Die Wissenschaft unter der Optik des Künstlers zu sehn, die Kunst aber unter der des Lebens«. Oxford: Peter Lang, 2010.
- "Eines Gottes Glück voller Macht und Liebe." Beiträge zu Nietzsche, Hölderlin, Heidegger. Weimar: Klassik Stiftung Weimar, Bauhaus-Universität Weimar, 2009.
- Words in Blood, Like Flowers: Philosophy and Poetry, Music and Eros in Hölderlin, Nietzsche, and Heidegger. Albany: State University of New York Press, 2006, paper: 2007.
- Nietzsche e la Scienza: Arte, vita, conoscenza. Translated by Fulvia Vimercati. Raffaello Cortina Editore. Milan. 1996.
- Nietzsche's Philosophy of Science: Reflecting Science on the Ground of Art and Life. State University of New York Press. Albany. 1994.

=== Edited collections ===
- Reading David Hume's 'Of the Standard of Taste. Berlin: de Gruyter, 2019.
- Hermeneutic Philosophies of Social Science. Berlin: de Gruyter, 2017.
- New Nietzsche Studies. [The Journal of the Nietzsche Society.] 1996 - ongoing.
- The Multidimensionality of Hermeneutic Phenomenology. Frankfurt am Main: Springer, 2013. [With Dimitri Ginev]
- Heidegger und Nietzsche. Amsterdam: Rodopi, 2012. [With Holger Zaborowski and Alfred Denker]
- Nietzsche, Habermas, and Critical Theory. Amherst, New York. Prometheus Books Humanity Books Imprint. 2004.
- Hermeneutic Philosophy of Science, Van Gogh's Eyes, and God: Essays in Honor of Patrick A. Heelan. S.J. [Boston Studies in the Philosophy of Science.] Dordrecht. Kluwer. 2002.
- Nietzsche, Theories of Knowledge and Critical Theory: Nietzsche and the Sciences I [Boston Studies in the Philosophy of Science.] Dordrecht. Kluwer. 1999.
- Nietzsche, Epistemology and Philosophy of Science: Nietzsche and the Sciences II [Boston Studies in the Philosophy of Science.] Dordrecht. Kluwer Academic Publishers. 1999.
- From Phenomenology to Thought, Errancy, and Desire: Essays in Honor of William J. Richardson, S.J. [Phænomenologica] Kluwer Academic Publishers. Dordrecht. 1995.
