= Ethical Perspectives =

- Discipline: Philosophy
- Language: English
- Edited by: Benjamin De Mesel

Publication details
- History: 1994–present
- Impact factor: 0.212

Standard abbreviations
- ISO 4: Ethical Perspect.

Indexing
- ISSN: 1370-0049 (print); 1783-1431 (web)

Links
- Journal homepage

Ethical Perspectives is a peer-reviewed academic journal in the field of philosophy, established in 1994 and published by Peeters Online Journals. It publishes articles in English, focusing on ethics and related fields. It is edited by Benjamin De Mesel.

== Abstracting and indexing ==
The journal is indexed in the following services:

- Arts and Humanities Citation Index
- Current Contents/Arts and Humanities
- Social Sciences Citation Index
- Journal Citation Reports/Social Sciences Edition
- Current Contents/Social and Behavioral Sciences
- European Reference Index for the Humanities
- Philosopher's Index
- ATLA Religion Database
- Sociological Abstracts
- Index Theologicus; Elenchus Bibliographicus (Ephemerides Theologicae Lovanienses)
- Religious and Theological Abstracts
- INIST/CNRS
- ERIH PLUS (European Reference Index for the Humanities and Social Sciences)
- Scopus
- CrossRef
- Thomson Scientific Links
