= Higher Institute of Philosophy =

Research institute of University of Louvain

- Institut supérieur de Philosophie
- Other name: ISP
- Motto: Sedes Sapientiae (Latin)
- Motto in English: Seat of Wisdom, Seat of Knowledge
- Type: School of philosophy, research institute
- Established: 1889 (137 years ago)
- Founder: Cardinal Mercier
- Parent institution: University of Louvain
- President: Alexandre Guay
- Rector: Vincent Blondel
- Location: Louvain-la-Neuve, Belgium
- Campus: Planned community
- Language: French, English
- Website: uclouvain.be/isp

The Institut supérieur de Philosophie (ISP) (French for: Higher Institute of Philosophy) is an independent research institute at the University of Louvain (UCLouvain) in Louvain-la-Neuve, Belgium. It is a separate entity to the UCLouvain School of Philosophy.

It was founded in Louvain (Leuven) in 1889 and split in 1968, when the French-speaking part moved to Louvain-la-Neuve.

The institute holds the archives of Edmund Husserl, Jean Ladrière, Michel Henry and Maurice Blondel.

== History ==
The Institut supérieur de Philosophie was founded by Cardinal Mercier on 8 November 1889 with the intent to be a beacon of Neo-Thomist philosophy, although Philosophy and Theology have been taught at the universities of Leuven since 1425. The institute initially taught programs in French and started courses in Dutch in 1933. After the language split of 1968, the French-speaking Institut supérieur de Philosophie moved to the new city of Louvain-la-Neuve while the Instituut voor Wijsbegeerte is today a faculty of the KU Leuven, in Leuven.

== Programs offered ==
With the UCLouvain's School of Philosophy, the institute offers both taught and research degrees (B.A., M.A., MPhil and PhD) as well as pre-doc and post-doc programs, in French and English.

== Departments ==
- Centre for Philosophy of Science and Society (CEFISES)
- The "PHIGOV" cell of the Centre for Legal Philosophy (CPDR)
- Centre Europè (CEUR)
- Centre for Studies and Research in Contemporary Philosophies (CERPhiCo)
- Centre De Wulf-Mansion (CDWM)
- Centre for Economic and Social Ethics (ETES/Hoover Chair) led by Philippe Van Parijs
- Centre for Phenomenological Studies (CEP)
- Archival fonds of literature, philosophy and the arts (Fonds-Alpha)

== Husserl-Archives ==
The Institute, together with its Dutch-speaking counterpart in Leuven, are well known as the home of the Husserl-Archives, the research center responsible for the publication of the philosophical work of Edmund Husserl. After the death of the founder of the phenomenological movement, fearing for the destruction of his Nachlass at the hands of the Nazis, Father Herman Van Breda (Franciscan), PhD student at the institute of the Catholic University of Louvain, saved Husserl's manuscripts, library and widow and smuggled them to Leuven via diplomatic channels. The Louvain-la-Neuve archive also contains a complete copy of the documents present in Leuven.

== Prizes awarded by the Higher Institute of Philosophy ==
The Higher Institute of Philosophy awards two prizes:

- The Mercier Prize awarded in odd years for work in ontology, metaphysics or first philosophy.
- The Dopp Prize awarded annually for two consecutive years for a graduate thesis and the third year for a doctoral thesis.

== Publications ==
- The Revue philosophique de Louvain; created in 1894 as the Revue néo-scolastique, it takes its present name in 1946.
- The International Philosophical Bibliography / Répertoire bibliographique de la philosophie, founded in 1934, published jointly with the Hoger Instituut voor Wijsbegeerte between 1981 and 2008, published only by ISP UCLouvain since 2009.
- Phenomenological Studies, a biannual journal founded in 1985, which was completed in 2008.
- The Hedegerian Bulletin, an annual review founded in 2011.

== Renowned emeriti ==
- André Léonard
- Jean Ladrière
- Joseph Maréchal
- Désiré-Joseph Mercier
- Herman Parret

== Guest researchers and lecturers ==
Internationally renowned professors who have lectured at the institute:

- Étienne Gilson
- Jacques Lacan
- Paul Ricoeur
- Emmanuel Levinas
- Maurice Merleau-Ponty
- Jan Patočka
- Jacques Derrida
- Jean-François Lyotard
- Charles Hartshorne
- Michel Foucault
- Karl Popper
- John Searle
- Peter Strawson
- Umberto Eco
- Donald Davidson
- Richard Rorty
- Bernard Williams
- Don Cupitt
