= Line stopping =

Line stopping or line plugging is a means of isolating a piping system to provide a shut off where none exists. This process serves as a control, or temporary valve, that can be removed after permanent alterations or valve replacements/additions have been made. With a hot tap previously made on a line, a line stopper is attached to a temporary valve, and the valve is opened. The line stopper is hydraulically or mechanically pushed into the line to seal the pipe. The main is supported by the line stop sleeve. After performing the necessary service, the stop is removed, and a blind flange is installed on the sleeve.

There are various types of line stopping heads. The oldest and still most widely used method of line plugging is the pivoting head style line stop. This technology dates back to the 1930s. The pivot head line stop requires a full size on size hot tap in order to be inserted into the operating piping system. Other methods include the folding head line stop, which enters the pipe through a reduced branch hot tap; the Sure-Stop line stop, which intersects the pipe and does not seal inside the pipe like other methods; and the HTP, which is a high temperature, high pressure system that will stop the flow on existing pipes at operating temperatures above what other methods of line stops can safely stop.

A single line stop can be used to stop off and abandon a shutdown. Two or more line stops can be used in tandem to isolate and bypass many intersecting lines at once. Fluid in the line is bypassed, leaving a workable dead section to alter, repair, or add a valve while service provided by this line is continued.

Services can be performed on pipes from ¾” – 80” in size. Line Stops can be performed on almost any kind of pipe with pressures or product under pressure including all types of pipe materials, e.g.:

- cast iron
- ductile iron
- P.V.C. and H.D.P.E.
- asbestos cement / transite
- pre-stressed concrete cylinder
- non-cylinder concrete
- stainless steel
- steel and copper
