= Johns Manville =

American manufacturing corporation

- Type: mostly Private (Note: Moody began publishing numbers for the company in 1913, following the sale of $2m of preferred stock. In 1923 some shares were offered to employees and JP Morgan in 1927 distributed a lot of shares to a small number of associates. J-M in its 100th anniversary pamphlet says the company transitioned to public ownership in 1927.) until 1927 Public until 2001 Subsidiary (2001-)
- Industry: Manufacturing; Mining (-1995)
- Founded: 1858 in New York City 1886 in Milwaukee; Reincorporated: 1901; 1926; 1981; Bankruptcy: 1982-1988
- Founders: Henry Ward Johns; Charles Brayton Manville
- Headquarters: Denver, Colorado, U.S.
- Key people: Bob Wamboldt (president and CEO)
- Products: Insulation; Roofing materials; Engineered products
- Parent: Berkshire Hathaway
- Website: www.jm.com

Johns Manville is an American company based in Denver, Colorado, that manufactures insulation, roofing materials and engineered products.

For much of the 20th century, Johns-Manville was the global leader in the manufacture of asbestos-containing products, including asbestos pipe insulation, asbestos shingles, asbestos roofing materials and asbestos-cement pipe.

While the company historically was a pioneer of the industry and narrowly focused on asbestos products, Johns-Manville in 1935 began to gradually expand into the business of wooden building insulation and in 1959 abruptly established itself in the glass fiber business by taking over the fiber division of Libbey Owens Ford, which was the second largest by revenue in the United States. In 1978 Manville re-entered the lumber business in a big way with the purchase of Olinkraft, the former Forest Product Division of the Olin Corporation. JM was also engaged in the mining of certain specialty minerals: diatomite (fossilized silica) from 1928-1991 (at times was the world leading diatomite producer), perlite (hydrated volcanic silica) from 1959-1991 and PGM metals (platinum and palladium) from 1986-1995 (discovered the one and only U.S. PGM deposit).

The Johns-Manville Corporation went public on the New York Stock Exchange in 1928 and was included in the Dow Jones Industrial Average from 1930 until 1982. It was a Fortune 500 company in each of the years 1955-1996. The company had crossed the $10 million revenue threshold in 1911. The $100 million mark was first exceeded in 1942 during World War 2 and then in peace-time in 1947. In 1974, revenue exceeded one billion dollars.

In 1982, facing unprecedented liability for asbestos injury claims, the company voluntarily filed for bankruptcy under Chapter 11 of the U.S. Bankruptcy Code. During six years of complex litigation it was established that the company had knowingly ruined the health of their own employees and of people who made a living applying asbestos in the field. Johns Manville emerged from bankruptcy in 1988, owned mostly by a trust fund established to compensate victims of its former products.

Berkshire Hathaway bought the company in 2001.

Today, Johns Manville is still a manufacturer and marketer of (asbestos-free) products for building insulation, mechanical insulation, commercial roofing and roof insulation, as well as fibers and non-woven materials for commercial, industrial and residential applications. The company serves markets that include aerospace, automotive and transportation, air handling, appliance, HVAC, pipe and equipment, filtration, waterproofing, building, flooring, interiors and wind energy. Johns Manville has annual sales over $4.5 billion. The company employs 8,000 people and operates 46 manufacturing facilities in North America and Europe.

== History ==
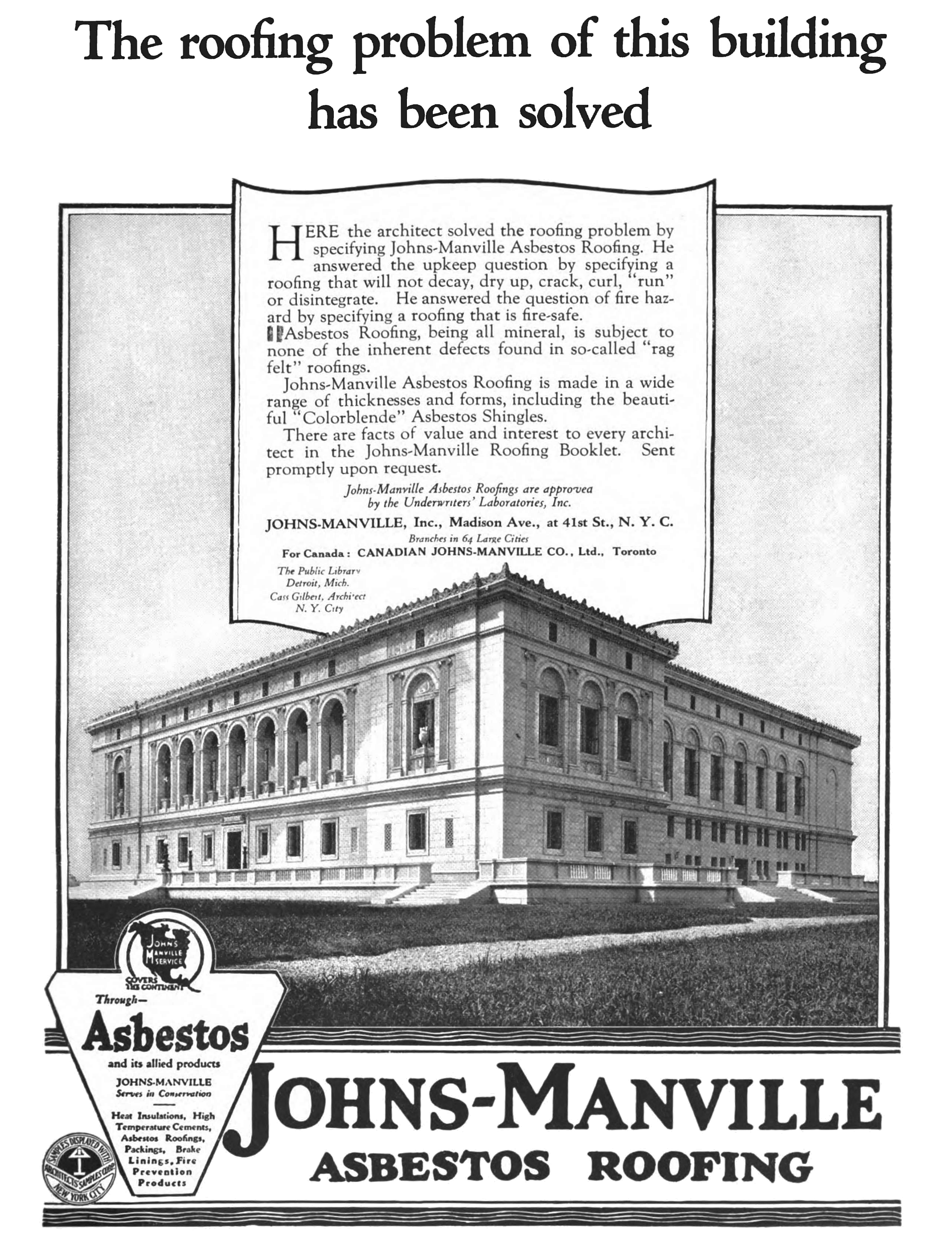
An advertisement for Johns-Manville asbestos roofing used in the construction of the Detroit Public Library's main building, 1921

=== Early years ===
The present-day Johns Manville company traces its origins to two early manufacturers of construction materials. Just prior to the American Civil War, in 1858, at the age of 21, Henry Ward Johns (Note: 1837 West Stockbridge - Feb 8, 1898 Yonkers; died from lung disease) founded the H.W. Johns Manufacturing Company (Note: Until ca. 1866, his company was called Johns & Crosley Manufacturing Co., and thereafter simply H. W. Johns and was located at 510 Broadway (across the St. Nicholas Hotel) and thereafter on 78 William Street. From 1858-1860 he did business in: (1) 349 Fulton Street, opposite the Brooklyn City Hall (2) 120 Wall Street at the corner of South Street, opposite the East River docks (3) 510 Broadway. In 1960 he moved to 78 William Street and stayed there for 13 years. His supply of asbestos then came from outcroppings on Staten Island.) in New York City. He obtained a number of patents during his business career. (Note: US 76,773 (Apr 14, 1868): Improved Compound for Roofing and Other Purposes; ...)

In the midst of the Second Industrial Revolution, on March 16, 1886, the Manville Covering Company was incorporated with a capital stock of $200,000 in Wisconsin by Charles Brayton Manville, (Note: Dec 16, 1834 Watertown - Nov 27, 1927 Pleasantville) who also won several patents (Note: US 334,959 (Jan 26, 1886): Steam Boiler and Pipe Covering; US 378,372 (Feb 21, 1888): Boiler Covering; US 393,441 (Nov 27, 1888): Cold Surface Covering; US 465,701 (Dec 22, 1891): Pipe Covering; US 527,867 (Oct 23, 1894): Pipe Covering and Process of Manufacturing Same) and whose grandson was the much-married socialite Tommy Manville, and whose granddaughter married into aristocracy.

In 1891, the H. W. Johns Manufacturing Co. consolidated with its four largest competitors. (Note: Chalmers Spence Company, New York; Asbestos Packing Company, Boston; W. Trainer & Company, Boston; Shields & Brown Company, Chicago) Business was continued as H. W. Johns Manufacturing Co., (Note: incorporated June 25, 1891 in New Jersey) the name of the pioneer in the business and owner of the largest asbestos plant in the world employing 125 workers in Brooklyn. The company had been running perennial advertisements in dozens of newspapers for more than 30 years, (Note: Scientific American (1878): American Architect and Building News (1878): Frank Leslie's Illustrated Newspaper (1878): Harper's Weekly (1878): Oil, Paint And Drug Reporter (1878): The Working Farmer (October 1859, 1860, 1862); ...) creating a brand. Keasbey & Mattison with their plant near Philadelphia were a major competitor at the time.

At the turn of the century, virtually all asbestos used in the United States was imported from Canada. Under the Dingley Act of 1897, raw asbestos was free to import, while there was a 25% duty on imported manufactured asbestos products and the quantity so imported was relatively small.

=== Later Years ===
In 1901, the H.W. Johns Manufacturing Company and the Manville Covering Company of Milwaukee merged to form the H.W. Johns-Manville Company with a capital of $2,500,000 in appraised assets and $500,000 of new cash raised. (Note: The H.W. Johns-Manville Company was incorporated in the state of New York on December 13 or 16, 1901 with a capital of $500,000 7% preferred and $2,500,000 common stock. The merger became effective on January 1, 1902. The preferred stock was issued for cash while the common stock was exchanged for the properties valued at $2,604,133.47. In April 1913, authorized capital was increased to $5,000,000 preferred and $5,000,000 common and $2,000,000 preferred were issued, but no new common was issued. The preferred was then reduced over time with the last shares called on January 1, 1923. At the same time, the 25,000 shares of common stock outstanding were exchanged 8-for-1 for 200,000 shares of the new no-par stock and 50,000 new shares made available for subscription by employees, all 50,000 were sold.) H. W. Johns Jr reportedly sold his remaining interest in 1908. In 1920 the company renamed itself to Johns-Manville Incorporated. In 1926, the firm was reincorporated as Johns-Manville Corporation. (Note: Incorporated in the state of New York on December 28, 1926. The 250,000 shares of the old company were exchanged for 750,000 shares of the new company (3-for-1) and additionally for 75,000 shares of par $100 7% preferred stock (3-for-10). Actually transferred were the properties. The new company was not a holding company (and the old company was presumably dissolved).) On the occasion, JP Morgan & Co invested close to $7,500,000 into what had theretofore essentially been a family-owned "gold mine" (New York Times). A few months later JP Morgan & Co. increased their stake substantially, exercising an option obtained in March 1927 to buy 400,000 shares (53%) at $47 1/2, when the stock was trading between $78 and $84 on the exchange in June 1927. In both cases though this was not new financing for the company, but the purchase of stock from other individuals.

From 1902 to 1920 the company had paid a total of $3,067,969.07 of dividends on its 7% preferred and its common stock and paid out $9,067,815.25 in dividends from 1921-1926. The buyback of $2,500,000 face amount of preferred stock for cash concluded in 1923 was also a form of (self-selecting) cash dividend.

External videos
- The Story of Asbestos (1921)

On the New York Curb Exchange Manville common stock more than doubled during 1927 from a low of 55 1/2 in January to a high of 126 1/2 in November. There had been some trading of the old company's stock on the Curb Market as well. (Note: 1925: 143 1/2 (Nov) 185 (Aug); 1926: 130 (Mar) 220 (Dec)) The stock was listed on the NYSE in February 1928. In February '29 market capitalization briefly exceeded $180 million.

Raybestos Manhatten went public on the NYSE in September 1929. While also a fairly large company, they focused on auto brake linings, which used long fiber asbestos, and were not a direct competitor to JM.

Johns-Manville Common Stock Price Range (Note: 1928 1929)
	Year		Jan	Feb	Mar	Apr	May	Jun	Jul	Aug	Sep	Oct	Nov	Dec
1928	202	High		125	122 7/8	133 1/2	134	124 7/8	117 1/2	140	159 1/4	177 1/2	194 3/4	202
1928	96 1/4	Low		114	111 1/2	116 1/2	120 1/2	96 1/4	101 3/8	116 7/8	130 1/8	148	161 3/4	159
1929	242 3/4	High	237	242 3/4	217	187	194	189	200 3/4	205	219 1/4	211 3/8	137	140 3/4
1929	90	Low	180 1/2	192 1/2	155 1/4	162	152 1/2	161 1/2	179 1/2	175 1/8	190 5/8	107	90	105

In 1929 J-M obtained a license from the Eternit Pietra Artificiale, S.A. of Genoa, Italy to manufacture and sell seamless asbestos-cement pipe ("Transite Pipe") in the U.S. and in Canada. Two sets of machinery were built in Italy and were shipped for installation at Waukegan.

Adolfo Mazza established an asbestos-cement factory in Casale Monferrato in 1907 for the production of roofing materials under a process invented by his former colleague Ludwig Hatschek. He began experimenting with an asbestos-cement pipe in 1911, obtained a first pipe patent in 1913 and began commercial production in 1916. In 1921 he applied for patents internationally, including in the United States.

On June 26, 1929 the Johns-Manville International Corporation was incorporated in Delaware. In the early 1930s, the United States was still the biggest consumer and importer of asbestos, Canada was still by far the biggest producer. Johns-Manville in 1930 was the largest asbestos company in the United States, employed 10,000 people, made more than 1,000 individual products in 12 factories supplied from two mines (Asbestos, Quebec and Chrysotile, Arizona) and had a substantial interest in a plant in the Donk suburb of Mol (Belgium).

Theodore F. Merseles, president since July 1, 1927 and former president of Montgomery Ward, died unexpectedly on March 6, 1929. On March 15, 1929, Lewis H. Brown was elected president of the company. After serving for 17 years he became Chairman of the Board on September 18, 1946 and was succeeded as president by R. W. Lea.

In 1931 the company went into the business of providing credit to its own customers, large distributors and home-owners alike, who could spread out their payment over periods ranging from 6 months to 2 years without having to involve third-party banks. In October 1934 the Johns-Manville Credit Corporation was formed with a capital of $1 million. Under the National Housing Act of 1934 the company was to make home loans on favourable terms in cooperation with the government to improve the quality of housing in the United States. At the end of 1942 the Credit Corp sold its loan portfolio to the Commercial Credit Co., and was dissolved.

During the depression, no dividend was paid on common stock (last paid Oct 15, 1931; first paid July 15, 1935). In 1933 the April 1 and July 1 quarterly dividend on cumulative preferred stock was not paid until December. In 1937 100,000 shares of stock were sold (at $100 per share (Note: Pro rata warrants for 2 new shares for each 15 held, given to existing stockholders, briefly traded on the NYSE in 1937. Feb: 4 3/8—5 1/16, Mar: 4 5/16—6 1/8; J-M shares were traded at: Jan: 143—155 Feb: 134 1/8—150 Mar: 134—148 1/2 In other words, shareholders who chose not to invest were compensated for the dilution at a loss for the corporation, which sold below market value.)) to finance $6,920,000 of ongoing plant expansions and to inject $1.2 million additional cash into the Johns-Manville Credit Corporation. This was the first new financing since incorporation, bringing the outstanding stock to 850,000 common shares.

During World War 2, Johns Manville managed operations of the Kansas Army Ammunition Plant in Parsons. In 1943 J-M factories continued to operate at a high level, management however attributed a growing percentage of the demand to ordinary (civilian) business that had been deferred due to the war. The company was accruing a deferred expenditure account, in anticipation of heavy spending required for renewals and expansion after the war. In each of the years 1940, 1941 and 1944, $3,000,000 was spent to redeem at 120 the 75,000 shares of preferred stock issued in 1926. (Note: The board voted on Jan 15, 1940 to redeem 7,500 shares on April 1 and voted on Nov 18, 1940 to redeem 17,500 shares on Jan 1, 1941. 25,000 shares were redeemed Oct 1, 1941. 25,000 shares were redeemed Apr 1, 1944.)

In July 1945 $17,000,000 were raised with the sale of a new issue of 3.5% convertible preferred stock. (Note: Shareholders were given the right to subscribe to 1 share of the par $100 preferred for each 5 common shares held. Before Aug 1, 1955 one share plus $15 in cash could be converted to 1 common share. The new stock was redeemable at 105, the redemption premium decreasing each year to a final 102 after Aug 1, 1948. Authorized capital was increased from 1,000,000 to 1,500,000 common shares with no intention to sell new common stock in the near future. The offer expired Aug 4, 1945. Morgan Stanley took up the remainder of 6,833 shares.) In each of 1947 and 1950 about half of the stock was called for redemption with the goal of having it converted to common stock. (Note: Only a year later, 167,406 were outstanding and a block of 85,000 shares was called for redemption on Aug 20, 1946. It was company policy to only have common stock outstanding. The remainder of the preferred stock (ca. 65,500 shares) was called for redemption on March 6, 1950 at $102. Eager to conserve its cash, an arrangement was made with Morgan Stanley, who offered $102.5 and were given a discount for conversion, which nominally required payment of $15 in cash for each preferred share converted.) A $50 million expansion program was set in motion during 1946 and expected to yield first results in 1947. Part of this program were several new facilities: a research center near Manville (NJ), a plant in Natchez, Mississippi for insulating board, one at Tilton, New Hampshire for asbestos insulation, one at Port Union near Toronto for asbestos-cement pipe and rock wool insulation and one at Marrero, Louisiana for asbestos-cement pipe.

On March 31, 1947 the company bought the Goetze Gasket & Packing Co of New Brunswick, New Jersey (est. 1887), owner of a 40,000 sq. ft. factory in that town. Effective May 12, 1947, the common stock was split 3-for-1. Each of the following quantities were tripled: 1,500,000 authorized common stock, 950,461 outstanding shares (to 2,851,383), 74,634 reserved for conversion of the preferred. On July 15, 1947 the company arranged a line of credit with the Metropolitan and the Mutual life insurance companies for a maximum of $25,000,000 in 20-year notes. It paid 0.5% on amounts not borrowed for the right to borrow until Dec 31, 1950 at any time at the rate of 2.7% (apparently some form of interest rate swap). In 1947 $5,000,000 were borrowed under this arrangement.

In 1949, the company's Canadian branch was involved in the Asbestos Strike at its mines in Asbestos, Quebec.

In the early 1950s the company framed itself as vital for national defense, as was common for companies that could be considered on the fringes of the military-industrial complex. The company would pursue projects for "the development of substitutes for critical materials, jet aircraft blanket insulations, filters for radioactive dusts, improved fireproof clothing and other projects which will play a vital role in military and civilian defense".

Effective March 12, 1956 the common stock was split 2-for-1. One share of par $100 common stock worth $100 in 1901 would have been split 8x in 1923, 3x in 1926, 3x in 1947 and 2x in 1956 into 144 shares with a 1956 market value of ca. $50 per share. $100 in 1956 had a purchasing power of $320 in 1901 though, due to inflation.

External videos
- Underground Arteries: The Story of Transite Pipe (1949)

In 1956 a $40,000,000 expansion plan mainly for an increase in production of Transite Pipe (asbestos-cement pipe) was carried out. Existing plants at Marrero, Waukegan, Manville and Watson, California were equipped with new facilities. A large plant at Stockton was underway and the plant at Denison was announced on August 22, 1956. The Denison plant was the company's 7th Transite Pipe plant (one additional plant was at Toronto). It was the first continuous asbestos-cement pipe mill and was almost completely automated. It was one of 8 new J-M factories opened in 1958, the company's centennial anniversary (Note: new insulating board plant at North Bay, Ontario; new insulating board plant at Klamath Falls, Oregon; hardboard plant extension at Natchez, Ms.; floor tile plant extension at Marrero, La.; extension of plant in Chicago; Denison pipe mill; Stockton pipe mill; roofing plant at Savannah, Ga.) and Denison was one of 26 towns in the United States and Canada where J-M mines or factories were located.

In December 1958, Johns-Manville bought Libbey-Owens-Ford Glass Fibers, Inc. for about $55 million in stock, (Note: 2,281,404 of 2,710,193 shares (84.2%; including the 50% held by the Libbey-Owens-Ford Glass Co.) voted to sell all assets and business to the new Johns-Manville Fiber Glass Inc wholly owned Manville subsidiary, in exchange for 1,093,803 J-M shares (1-for-2.5). J-M common in Dec 1958 traded between 48 and 52 5/8, making this a $55 million dollar transaction.) based in Toledo, Ohio and second largest by revenue in the glass fiber business. The properties obtained included a research center at Waterville, Ohio and plants in Parkersburg, West Virginia, Houston, Corona, California, Waterville and Defiance, Ohio (3 plants). The new company became the 10th Manville operating division and was headquartered in Toledo. The 7 new plants resulted in a new total of 33, including the plant in Belgium. LOFFG revenue/net_earnings was $23,280,000/$1,111,000 (1957) and $27,606,000/$1,432,000 (1958). At the time, Dominick Labino was working for Glass Fibers; Barnard and Labino both joined Johns-Manville. Glass Fibers had several plants in Waterville and Defiance, which are still in operation under Johns Manville,

In 1969 the common stock was split 2-for-1.

In 1978-79 Johns-Manville acquired Olinkraft, Inc. (renamed Manville Forest Products), a deal among the largest Mergers & Acquisitions of the decade. A cash tender offer for 49% of Olinkraft common stock at $65 per share was completed Nov 8, 1978 at a cost of $286,326,000. Olin shareholders on Dec 28, 1978 approved a merger consummated Jan 19, 1979. The remaining 51% (4,598,327 shares) of Olinkraft common were exchanged 1-for-1 for the new $5.40 series par $65 Manville cumulative preferred stock. Manville was required to redeem all of the preferred shares before 2009 at par through a sinking fund commencing 1987. Manville in 1984 gained the right to redeem any amount of shares at $67.70, with the call premium declining to $65 by 1989. Options for 39,162 preferred shares were issued to honor existing options to Olinkraft common stock. JM Capital Corp was incorporated in Delaware on Sep 22, 1978 and absorbed Olinkraft, Inc by merger on Jan 19, 1979.

JM Capital Corp name history
Jan 19, 1979	Olinkraft, Inc
Apr 24, 1980	Manville Forest Products Corp
Jun 3, 1991	Riverwood International Corp
Mar 24, 1992	Riverwood International USA, Inc
Mar 28, 1996	Riverwood International Corp
Aug 8, 2003	Graphic Packaging International, Inc

The acquisition increased Manville revenue by 25% and increased preferred dividends from $0 to ca. $24 million per year

Pro Forma Earnings for 1978
	Revenue	Earnings (for common stock)	per share
Actual	$1.649bn	$121.6mn	$5.62
with Olinkraft	$2.096bn	$103.5mn	$4.78

Olinkraft was created through a May 31, 1974 spin-off by which Olin Corp shareholders received 1/2 of Olin new common stock and 1/3 of Olinkraft stock for each share of Olin Corp old common stock (i.e. a spin-off combined with a 1-for-2 reverse split).

Incorporated in Delaware in November 1966 as successor to the Olin-Mathieson Forest Products Division with plants at West Monroe, Shreveport, Huttig and Winnfield, and headquartered in West Monroe, Louisiana, Olinkraft in 1978 employed 7,100 in 26 plants in the United States and 3 in Brazil. They owned 600,000 acres of woodland in northern Louisiana, southern Arkansas and east Texas (greater Ark-La-Tex region) and 100,000 acres in Brazil, enough to satisfy 50% of their wood fiber needs. Olinkraft mostly made paper products for the packing industry (e.g. Kraft paper), but also plywood products for construction.

Olin took over Frost Lumber Industries Inc in 1952, offering 18 Olin shares for each Frost share. It took over 5 plants of the Brown Paper Mill Co in West Monroe and the Winnfield plant (est 1910) of the Mansfield Hardwood Co, both in 1955. The Wood-Mosaic Corp of Louisville, Kentucky owning 3 plants in the US and Canada was acquired in 1969 in exchange for Olin-Mathieson stock and was operated as a subsidiary of Olinkraft.

Olinkraft stock was trading between $31 and $39 when Texas Eastern Corporation made a first offer of $51 on July 17, 1978. In an ensuing bidding war, Texas Eastern dropped out at $60, when J-M made their $65 offer on October 18.

Extensions granted
Date	Days
Dec 21, 1982	60
Feb 7, 1983	60
Apr 6, 1983	45
May 23, 1983	30
Jun 23, 1983	30

During bankruptcy creditors of Manville Forest Products (MFP), which became a wholly owned subsidiary under the Manville Corporation in the 1981 reorganization, sought to have their claims separated from asbestos injury claims on the grounds that (1) they bought Olinkraft bonds before the 1979 acquisition, (2) Forest Products was independent within the Manville family and not particularly consolidated and (3) MFP did not deal with asbestos in any way. The creditors were 5 insurance companies holding $90 million in MFP debt. Due to the complexity of the asbestos case, Manville was granted multiple extensions in 1983 to present a plan of reorganization, and while the court sided with the MFP creditor's arguments over the asbestos claimant's arguments, the motion to separate remained unresolved during the extensions period.

Riverwood International went public with an IPO in 1992. On Mar 27, 1996 Manville disposed of their remaining 81.3% stake for $1,080 million.

By a reorganization effective October 30, 1981, the Manville Corporation (incorp. in Delaware on August 21, 1981) commenced business through 5 principal operating subsidiaries: Manville (Building Materials, Forest Products, International, Products) Corporation and Johns-Manville Corporation. This was an attempt to repair the reputation of a brand that had become tarnished by one of its operating divisions.

"... the public perception and understanding of JM has become distorted [...], as a consequence of unfavorable publicity and litigation involving the asbestos-related aspects of JM's businesses. There has been insufficient recognition of the other major JM businesses which account for well in excess of a majority of JM's sales and earnings. With the reorganization, accompanied by a change of name to Manville Corporation, it is anticipated that a better recognition of these facts and a better understanding of JM's businesses will ensue."

In 1982, for the first time in 42 years, Manville omitted a regular dividend.

Beginning just after World War II, sculptor Beverly Bender spent thirty-two years working in the art department of Johns-Manville, creating animal sculpture in her free time.

About 24 million shares of common stock were outstanding when Manville filed for bankruptcy.

Manville stock activity
	Employee stock purchase plan		Exercise of options		Deferred compensation plans	Dec 31		
	Common	Treasury	Common	Treasury	Treasury	Common	Treasury	5.40Pref
1978						22,008,466	195,329	
1979	436,561	42,205	11,666	7,420	2,825	22,456,693	142,879	4,606,946
1980	513,687	8,844	40,053	2,548	2,091	23,010,433	129,396	4,621,982
1981	621,009	11,349	9,233	2,365	1,662	23,640,675	114,020	4,627,689
1982	428,227	34,260			1,603	24,068,902	79,389	4,627,689
1983		10,258			187	24,068,902	68,944	4,627,689
1984					284	24,068,902	68,660	4,627,689
1987						24,068,902	68,069	4,627,689

=== Asbestos litigation and bankruptcy ===
Starting as early as 1929, Johns-Manville employees began claiming disability from lung diseases. The claims settled out of court, with a secrecy order. In 1943, Saranac Laboratory in New York confirmed the link between asbestos and cancer, but Johns-Manville suppressed the report. From approximately 1930 to 1950, attorney Vandiver Brown handled involvement in such lawsuits. Files and testimony alleged that "[Johns-Manville] maintained a policy into the 1970s of not telling its employes that their physical examinations showed signs of asbestosis".

In 1943, Johns-Manville suppressed a report confirming the link between asbestos and cancer. During the 1960s, 1970s and 1980s, the company faced thousands of individual and class action lawsuits based on asbestos-related injuries such as asbestosis, lung cancer and malignant mesothelioma. Many new settlements included offering $600 for asbestosis, while the FAIR Act called for $12,000 for this condition level.

As a result, the company voluntarily filed for chapter 11 bankruptcy protection in 1982. At that time, it was the largest company in United States history to have done so. The filing shocked financial analysts, but a few, such as Gary J. Aguirre, had predicted the filing and had forced the company to post a bond to guarantee payment to their clients.

The bankruptcy was resolved by the formation of the Manville Personal Injury Settlement Trust to pay asbestos tort claimants in an orderly fashion by giving the trust the majority of the equity in the company. The bankruptcy took over five years to process and resulted in protracted litigation. The Manville Trust is still in operation today.

Active asbestos suits Dec 31
	Cases	Plaintiffs (approx)
1978	1,181	1,500
1979	2,707	4,100
1980	5,087	9,300
1981	ca. 9,300	12,800

On August 26, 1982, Manville and 20 of its subsidiaries filed separate Chapter 11 bankruptcy petitions. On December 22, 1986 the Bankruptcy Court confirmed Manville's Second Amended and Restated Plan of Reorganization dated August 22, 1986. The plan was consummated on November 28, 1988.

The trust began operations on an interim basis in January 1987 and began settling (but not paying out) pre-bankruptcy claims in May 1988. It was funded with:

1. Insurance settlement: $615 million plus $72 million interest. $531 million was received on the consummation date.
2. $150 million in cash, which was prepaid 1987 with Manville reaping some tax benefits.
3. A $50 million note (dated Jan 1, 1988 (Note: "At consummation the company recorded a $53.7 million note payable to the personal injury trust, which is more accurately stated as a $50 million note plus accrued interest from January 1, 1988 through November 28, 1988. This note and related interest was paid in full in 1989.")) payable in two installments of $25 millon each on Sep 15, 1990 and Sep 15, 1991. The note plus $8 million ($8,117,715) of accumulated interest was prepaid in December 1989. (the "Trust Note")
4. 24,000,000 shares of Common Stock (50% at consummation date)
5. 7,200,000 shares of Series A Convertible Preferred Stock. The stock paid no dividends, and was not redeemable or transferable. It became convertible only after certain conditions were met, at which point it also gained voting power equivalent to the number of common shares it was convertible to (72,000,000).
6. A $1.65 billion (zero-interest (Note: "The personal injury trust also received non-interest bearing bonds totaling $1.8 billion at consummation. The bonds, disconted at 13%, consist of a series of fixed payments of $37.5 million biannually for 24 years beginning on August 31, 1991. The net present value of these payments amounted to $427.1 million at consummation.")) bond paying $75 million annually from 1991 to 2012. ("The Bond").
7. A $150 million zero-interest bond paying $75 million in 2013 and in 2014. (the "Second Bond", no reason given in the source why there were two bonds serving one purpose) (The net present value of these two bonds at the then-current 10-year treasury rate of 9% was about $600 million on consummation date)
8. Depending on the trust's funding needs, when not met by the above, up to 20% of Manville profits for fiscal year 1991 and later, payable before April 30 of the next fiscal year.

Manville common stock shareholders were hit the hardest. They received 1 share for each 8 shares of the old stock or 3 million shares, whereas creditors received 11 million shares in lieu of interest accrued since 1982 and preferred shareholders received 10 million of the new common stock as compensation for both their missed dividends and the principal. The creditors' principal was paid 60% in cash and 40% in notes.

The old stock rallied on Oct 4, 1988 in anticipation of the end of bankruptcy. In the wake of some positive press coverage, 3.6 million shares changed hands that day propelling the stock from 1 3/4 to 2 7/8. Manville officials cautioned investors and believed many of them to be uninformed. The new stock began trading on a when-issued basis in October and transitioned to regular trading on the NYSE on Dec 23, 1988.

=== Post-bankruptcy ===
The company emerged from Chapter 11 in 1988 as the Manville Corporation.

On July 31, 1991 the Alleghany Corporation acquired Manville's celite and perlite business for $144 million. At the time the Celite Division accounted for 50% of the diatomite world market.

In 1995 Manville sold its remaining 27% in the Stillwater Mining Company for $111 million. This was the last mining operation the company was engaged in.

Manville changed its name to Schuller Corporation on March 29, 1996. Schuller [ de ] was the name of a German glass fiber producer Johns Manville had acquired in 1971.

On April 5, 1996 MPIST exchanged their right to 20% of Manville net earnings for 32,527,110 newly issued common shares (about 20% of the fully diluted stock). On April 12 a special dividend of $6 was paid on the common stock to holders of record on April 8. It was declared on the same day (March 27) Riverwood (formerly Manville Forest Products) was sold for $1,080 million. The stock traded at a high of 15 1/4 in Q2 of 1996. The special dividend amounted to $968.1 million dollars, more than a third of the value of the company.

Common stock owned by the trust
Nov 28, 1988	24,000,000	+24,000,000	50%	Manville emerges from bankruptcy
Dec 9, 1992	96,000,000	+72,000,000	79.5%	conversion of 7,200,000 shares of Series A Convertible Preferred Stock (Note: 48,747,047 shares reported outstanding on Nov 11, 1992)
Apr 5, 1996	128,527,110	+32,527,110	82.8%	in exchange for profit sharing rights
Apr 13, 1998	124,927,110	-3,600,000	79%	bought back by the company for $46.8 million at avg. market value ($13 per share)

In 1997, the company changed its name back to Johns Manville (but without the hyphen), and this is the name under which it does business today. In 2001, Johns Manville became a wholly owned subsidiary of Berkshire Hathaway (NYSE: BRK.A, NYSE: BRK.B). All outstanding common stock was acquired at $13 per share or $1,800 million in total on February 27, 2001, of which the MPIST received more than $1,400 million.

Then chairman and CEO Jerry Henry retired in 2004. At that point, Steve Hochhauser became chairman, president and CEO. Todd Raba succeeded him in the summer of 2007.

In 2012, Johns Manville appointed a new CEO, Mary Rhinehart, and in 2014, she was appointed chairman as well. She was the CFO for Johns Manville and had been with the company for over 33 years. In 2020, Bob Wamboldt became the president and CEO, while Rhinehart remained as chairman. Wambolt retired in 2026 and was succeeded by John Vasuta.

== Plants ==
Pictures of plants (and also office buildings) can be found in the 1915 publication: J-M Products and Their Uses.

In the "Since" column below, a date in green indicates a plant that was originally constructed (greenfield project), brown indicates an existing plant was acquired. In a few cases location data and demolition timelines can be corroborated with google earth historical imagery (Pittsburg, Manville, Waukegan, Denison, etc).

Product Types
R	asbestos roof
S	asbestos shingles
P	asbestos-cement pipe
A	various asbestos products
B	wooden insulation board
F	glass fiber

Number of plants
	USA	Canada	World
year-end 1952	18	2	0
year-end 1959	32	3	3
Mar 1960	37		
year-end 1965	43	3	7

Plant	State	Since	Until	bold=exact	Prod
Long Island City	NY	ca. 1873			
First "real" plant. Production moved to Brooklyn after the Long Island City plant burned down. Roofing plant at Hunter's Point burned down 27 July 1871.
Brooklyn	NY			40.65719°N 74.0146°W	
Milwaukee	WI			43.03546°N 87.9138°W	
West Milwaukee	WI			43.04139°N 87.96974°W	
Nashua	NH	ca. 1907	1988	42.76389°N 71.44994°W	
Prof. Charles L. Norton of Manchester, Massachusetts and of the Massachusetts Institute of Technology spoke about Asbestos Wood, his new fire-resisting material, in front of insurance people in March 1907. He published an article in the April 27 issue of Electrical World. He won 2 patents that were assigned to the Asbestos Wood Co. of Maine. (Note: US847,293 Refractory Material and Process for Producing It (March 12, 1907).; US865,606 Insulating Material and Method of Producing the Same (Sep 10, 1907):) HW Johns-Manville was exclusive sales agent for the Asbestos Wood Co. (in 1907, in 1914, ...) and had advertised "Transite Asbestos Wood" in 1909, and registered the trademark in 1923 claiming to have used it first in 1907. The Asbestos Wood & Shingle Co. was incorporated in New Hampshire on January 26, 1925 and the Johns-Manville Corp in 1927 owned 19,857.2 out of 20,000 shares. The Nashua plant was in operation in March 1907. Henry M. Whitney was president and was also president of the American Asbestos Company which owned mining properties at Black Lake, Quebec. Asbestos Wood does not contain any wood. It is a mixture of 80% short (refuse) asbestos fibers and 20% Magnesium oxide. The two materials bond to produce a material with properties comparable to wood, but which of course does not burn. Became part of BNZ Materials in 1988. The EPA in 1995-1997 removed 450,000 of contaminated soil and debris in a $4.6 million cleanup.
Lockport	NY	1910		43.18453°N 78.6983°W	
The plant of the United Indurated Fiber Co. was taken over in 1910 and expanded to make asbestos articles in addition to fiber. Burned for 6 hours after overheated oven exploded on May 15, 1914. Was in receivership since Apr 6, 1914 and sold at an auction on June 30, 1914 to the only bidder at reserve price ($300,000). Bought by J-M again in Sep 1914. Struck by 2 lightnings on May 12, 1915 and burned down. City officials agreed to put in place a new 12-inch water main to improve water pressure available to firefighting efforts. The A. W. Jack Corporation commenced business on Nov 28, 1918. Capitalized at $500,000 it produced asbestos mill board in the plant. The company started an extensive rebuilding program on May 1, 1922, which involved tearing down all existing structure to put new buildings in place on the 8 acre tract. In 1927 the Republic Asbestos Board Corporation (Archibald W. Jack president) with a capital of $2 million began operations producing 40 million sqft of wallboard a year.
Manville	NJ	1912	1986	40.5495°N 74.5814°W	A
External videos: Reflections of Manville - part 2; In 1913 the Manville, New Jersey plant was completed with a floor space of 1,000,000sqft. In 1929 Telex machines were installed in the New York headquarters and in Manville, connected via a private wire. Processing of asbestos ended in 1980 and the plant shut down in 1986. Contaminations were cleaned up from 1989 to December 1992 and buildings were demolished by 1995. Peak employment was 3,500. Operations started in October 1912. In August 1985, there were 850 workers left. On March 24, 1986, with 430 people remaining, a staggered final shutdown lasting until August 29, 1986 was announced. The plant was sold to the Johnson Machinery Co in 1988.
Waukegan	IL	1923	1998	42.38799°N 87.81947°W	AP
There was a plant in Waukegan under construction in 1921 and in operation until 1998 leaving behind significant contamination. The plant was dismantled in 2000-2001. About $30,000,000 were invested in the plant. There were efforts to officially name the company town of 5,000 employees north of Waukegan Asbestos City. By September 1923 the plant was in full operation.
Gretna	LA	1925	1936	29.91636°N 90.0673°W	
The plant at Gretna, Louisiana commenced operations in 1925, producing roofing and shingles in a 50,000sqft building taken over from the American Cotton Oil Co. In October 1926 Manville announced it would spend $500,000 on top of the $500,000 already invested to quintuple the capacity of the Gretna plant. Personnel and machinery were transferred to the new plant under construction in 1936 (i.e. Marrero). Operations began on March 1, 1925 with 90 workers and 200 workers were transferred to Marrero where work continued in September 1936.
Cincinnati	OH	1926			
A former World War I shell plant was remodeled in the fall of 1925 and produced the first asbestos shingles on Jan 13, 1926. Three main buildings: manufacturing: 48,000sqft; raw materials storage and power house: 8,000sqft; warehouse: 32,000sqft
Pittsburg	CA	1926	2003	38.0314°N 121.87848°W	
Ground was broken on Sep 24, 1925. The first unit was complete about Jan 1 and the second by the time the plant commenced operations on Feb 16, 1926. The plant was enlarged in 1928. Manufacture of asbestos products ceased in 1980 and in 2003 the roofing products business ceased operations. The company in November 2000 entered into a Voluntary Cleanup Agreement with the DTSC. Demolition of structures and contamination cleanup took place between 2005 and 2008.
Donk	Belgium	1928	1983	51.22413°N 5.11304°E	
Plant of Beton et Mollith was established in 1923. JM took it over in 1928 and increased capacity from 15,000tpa to 30,000tpa. 210 employees. On May 5, 1930 the plant was renamed Johns-Manville, S. A.. Beton en Mollith was originally owned by six local families. The company and the two plants in Donk and Ghent were taken over by some of its board members and employees in 1983 and renamed JM Balmatt. They produced asbestos until 1997 and went bankrupt in July 1998. The site was heavily contaminated. Belgium has one of the highest mesothelioma death rates in the world. Belgium had no natural deposit and had to rely entirely on imports of asbestos fiber. Primary production of asbestos product from the raw material was undertaken in some 22 locations in the country.
Redwood City	CA	1928		37.49412°N 122.21438°W	
Lompoc	CA	1928	1991	34.64292°N 120.45071°W	
In November 1928, Johns Manville acquired the Celite Products Company of Lompoc, California having a business of $3,300,000 annual sales. This included the properties of the National Magnesia Manufacturing Co. of Redwood City which had been acquired by Celite in April 1928. Both companies were started in 1912. At Lompoc was the largest plant for the processing of Diatomaceous earths ("celite") in the world, tapping a supply in the White Hills. The plant at Redwood City also processed celite and produced magnesia and asbestos products. Johns Manville announced the acquisition for an undisclosed cash sum on Nov 22, 1928. Having previously been a customer reliant on Celite Co.'s supply, J-M estimated to acquire a business generating $4 million in annual sales going forward. Manville's celite division was taken over by Alleghany Corp in 1991. Location of the Johns Manville Park.
Alexandria	IN	1929		40.2628°N 85.719°W	
On February 1, 1929 the plant(s) of the Banner Rock Products Company were acquired for a reported sum of $1,750,000, adding nearly 400 employees to the Johns-Manville Corporation. The Banner Rock Products Company was formed 1906. Plant No. 1 was on West Washington St., Plant No. 2 was an extension across the street. The company held a few patents. (Note: US884,456 (Apr 14, 1908) Insulating Compound; US1,387,391 (Aug 9, 1921) Yielding Mat Construction; US1,611,907 (Dec 28, 1926) Insulating Structure; US1,670,378 (May 22, 1928) Heat-Resisting Metal Structure; US1,824,430 (Sep 22, 1931) Apparatus and Process of Treating Mineral Wool) The plant began production in January 1907 and in 1937 was the oldest and still the largest of 16 rock wool plants in Indiana.
Los Angeles	CA	1929		34.02933°N 118.22852°W	
Acquisition of the Weaver-Henry Mfg Co. of Los Angeles was announced Mar 1, 1929.
Oswego	NY	1935	ca. 1940	43.4546°N 76.5045°W	B
The plant of the Oswego Board Corporation (incorporated in 1927 as a wholly owned subsidiary of the St. Regis Paper Company) was taken over under a (5-year) lease agreement. J-M had been the sole selling agent since the plant had opened in 1928. St. Regis Paper Co. produced 500 tons per day of paper in its mills in Deferiet, Black River, Norfolk, Norwood and Raymondville in Upstate New York. The Oswego plant made insulating board from the waste pulp material of these mills. Lease ended before 1957.
Marrero	LA	1936		29.90267°N 90.114°W	AP
Plant was built next to the Celotex insulation board plant.
Richmond	IN	1937	current	39.83511°N 84.91526°W	
In 1937 the Richmond, Indiana plant of the Fibre Conduit Co. was taken over.
Carson	CA	1938	1982	33.82349°N 118.2305°W	P
Construction start of a 150,000sqft building on a 50-acre tract near Watson station was announced in June 1937. The $1 million plant was to employ 300 and produce rock wool and asbestos-cement pipe. The 5th Manville plant on the West Coast was put in operation in early October 1938. Closing of the plant was announced Apr 12, 1982. A pipe coupling operation employing 20 was continued and 145 were laid off. The announcement came just weeks after the plan to close the Vernon plant was made public. In 1983 12 building were being dismantled.
Jarratt	VA	1939	1977	36.8181°N 77.4813°W	B
Construction began around May 1938 on 142 acres of a $1 million plant to employ 300-400 making the same (asbestos-free) wood fibre based insulation board product manufactured in the Oswego plant. The opening ceremony took place on October 19, 1939. The plant processed pine trees that had theretofore been of little commercial value as a building material and which were cut after growing for about 18 years on average. American Lumberman called the plant "a manufacturing miracle that takes place in the heart of a forest". The plant was sold to Georgia Pacific in (March) 1977 and was ultimately closed on November 1, 2013.
North Billerica	MA	1939	1988	42.58425°N 71.2675°W	
Produced Marinite and Marine Sheathing panels used in ship construction and for fireproofing ovens, boilers, etc. in the steel and chemical industries. Homogeneous material made from asbestos fiber and inorganic binders. Factory was the long term lease of a 109,400sqft former car shop of the Boston & Maine Railroad and employed 75-100. The B&M had acquired the 553 acres that made up the Iron Horse Park industrial complex in 1911 from 18 former privately owned parcels. In 1944 B&M sold 70 acres for sludge lagoons to JM and JM leased another 15 acres for a landfill. The landfill was capped in 1984 in an EPA "Immediate Removal Action". Marinite panels were developed to meet demand created by regulatory pressure enacted in response to the sinking of the Morro Castle in 1934. JM stopped shipping asbestos products from the plant in December 1985. In 1988 the plant as well as the Zelionople and Nashua plants were acquired by BNZ Materials Inc (bnzmaterials.com), run by former top executives of JM. The announcement on Jan 5, 1988 followed bankruptcy court approval given in October 1987. In 2008 an agreement was signed for a $23.53 million cleanup implementing EPA's 2004 Record of Decision plan.
Zelienople	PA	1940	1988	40.7917°N 80.15017°W	
Existing plant acquired in March 1940 was remodeled. The plant produced insulating firebrick and refractory cement. It employed 150 in 1969.
New Brunswick	NJ	1947		40.4718°N 74.44594°W	
plant of the Goetze Gasket & Packing Co. was taken over in 1947
Natchez	MS	1948		31.53705°N 91.36406°W	B
Opening ceremony was on June 25, 1948. Part of the 1956 expansion was the company's first hardboard plant, 54,300sqft adjacent to the Natchez insulating board factory. The plant was projected as a 60 million square feet per year operation employing 120 and increasing the annual payroll at Natchez from $1,500,000 to $2 million.
Tilton	NH	1948		43.45855°N 71.54457°W	
Produced a heat-resistant paper made from asbestos and inorganic clays for electrical insulation, trademarked Quinterra Asbestos Paper. Opened Oct 7, 1948 on 200 acre tract on the Winnipesaukee River, flanked by the Daniel Webster Highway and the Boston & Maine RR. 83 Manville Rd.
Toronto	ON			43.77743°N 79.14141°W	P
Fort Worth	TX	1952		32.7532°N 97.35022°W	
In October 1952 a plant of the American Asphalt Roof Corporation was taken over at 2316 West 5th Street in Fort Worth. The plant was spun-off when the Ruberoid Co. (on Sep 30, 1952) acquired American Asphalt Roof Corp (est. 1920) and its plants in Salt Lake City, East St. Louis and Forth Worth in exchange for $4 million worth of its own stock.
North Bay	ON	1957		46.33°N 79.5°W	B
Insulating board plant. Began operations in 1957. The plant's upstream water pipe ran westward from Gormanville Road in the Widdifield township. The plant later was owned by Nordfibre. At around 2010-2011 the works was being demolished, which when considering google earth historic imagery gives a probable exact location.
Savannah	GA	1956		32.1°N 81.139°W	
Opening ceremony was on Nov 20, 1956.
Stockton	CA	1957		37.90183°N 121.25952°W	P
The pipe mill at 1051 Sperry Road, Stockton opened in 1957. Made asbestos pipe until 1987. The plant began operations in October 1957. First shipment of pipe was made on November 4, 1957.
Denison	TX	1958	1988	33.81°N 96.539°W	P
On June 20, 1958 the pipe plant at Denison, Texas was formally opened. Ground had been broken Nov 30, 1956 and preliminary production had begun on April 15, 1958. A deep-background press book was released for the plant opening (incl. map). At its peak, 500 workers were employed. The plant closed in 1988 and stood abandoned for decades with sporadic cleanup taking place. The City of Denison with the Denison Development Alliance (nonprofit) bought the property in 2020. The city council approved Resolution No. 4015 on August 10, 2020, purchasing the 481 acres for $67,000, which was equal to the cost of an environmental study J-M had undertaken and so the property was effectively donated. The city however spent $103,000 on an insurance covering $10 million of unanticipated (non-asbestos) contamination. The demolition and cleanup was expected to cost $2 million. The completion of remediation was celebrated in a June 5, 2026 ceremony, when the 260 acre North Texas Logistics Park was dedicated as an empty lot ready for development.
Waterville	OH	1959		41.52422°N 83.72011°W	F
Houston	TX	1959		29.77°N 95.4°W	F
Corona	CA	1959	2001	33.868°N 117.5415°W	F
Johns Manville Fiberglass Manufacturing plant on 53-acre property was active between 1958 and 2001.
Parkersburg	WV	1959		39.3269°N 81.553°W	F
Defiance	OH	1959		41.279°N 84.341°W	F
Columbus Avenue plant.
Defiance	OH	1959		41.3044°N 84.339°W	F
Carpenter Road plant. Size was increased from 112,200sqft of floor space to 238,200sqft in an expansion program announced December 1959.
Defiance	OH	1959		41.286°N 84.3649°W	F
at 3rd and Perry Street.
Klamath Falls	OR	1959	1962	42.576°N 121.8706°W	B
The insulating board plant at Chiloquin, 22 miles north of Klamath Falls was completed in April 1958, but due to an economic downturn was not put into operation and instead a supply from Natchez was warehoused at the plant for distribution in the Pacific Northwest. Projected employment was 250 with a $1 million annual payroll. Ground had been broken Aug 19, 1956 for the 6 general groups of buildings comprising a total of 337,000sqft of floor space. The cost of the plant and of an initial supply of 450,000 cords of timber was $12 million The plant was characterized as the first to make use of lodgepole pine on a commercial scale. A long term contract for 50,000 cords of lodgepole pine per year from national forests was entered into with the government. The opening ceremony took place on June 30, 1959 making it the 7th J-M plant on the West Coast. After three years of unsteady operation, work stopped on May 4, 1962 (adverse market conditions) and Boise Cascade bought the plant in December 1962. They had no immediate plans to restart and moved some of the equipment to their other plants.
Joliet	IL	1959		41.5127°N 88.0928°W	
Acquisition of F. E. Schundler & Co for 148,000 newly issued common shares was announced on Sep 21, 1959. The company produced perlite, which Manville so far only had made use of very sparingly in their product portfolio. The company at the time was making $6,000,000 in revenue.
No Agua	NM	1959	1991	36.76°N 105.957°W	
US crude perlite: Year / Short tons; 1947 / 10,500; 1948 / 22,200; 1949 / 71,500; 1950 / 110,694; 1951 / 182,260; 1952 / 190,442; 1953 / 213,532; 1954 / 261,024; 1955 / 335,187; 1956 / 350,224; JM came into 2,000 acres of the largest commercial perlite deposit in the world, containing high grade mineral, from the F. E. Schundler acquisition. On December 20, 1960 a new $1 million 150,000tpa processing plant was put in operation, replacement for an old plant destroyed by fire (in April 1960). A single 150tph bulldozer after removing a few feet of overburden, ripped pure perlite from the ground. Two 18-ton haul trucks descended a steep slope to bring the ore from the hilltop to the processing plant 900ft below (an open pit mine on top of a hill). A 75,000 ton stockpile was accumulated during summer months to keep the plant running in the winter. The plant, which burned oil to dry the ore, then fed it into an intricate system of crushers and screens to produce and separate material fractions based on particle size. Loading facilities were some 20 miles to the north (via Route 285) at Antonito, a station in the Denver and Rio Grande Western Railroad system. Manville in 1991 sold the plant to Alleghany Corp, who transferred it to subsidiary Harborlite Corp. In 1999 the mine was still called the largest in the world and turned out 500,000tpa estimated to last for at least 20 more years. Imerys acquired Harborlite Corp in 2005. The original 25 ton per hour plant opened in 1951. (First shipment was made in August) Expanded ("popped") perlite was marketed under the Schundler trademark Coralux and was produced in Schundler plants in Joliet, DeKalb and Long Island City, but ore also was sent to associated companies, who then sold Coralux in their marketing territories. In 1952-53 capacity of operations at No Agua was increased by 50% and three new ore grades (particle sizes) were introduced. The deposit at No Agua was discovered by M. B. Mickelsen of Antonito in the fall of 1948. Schundler bought the property in the Summer of 1950. The Schundler plant was put in operation in September 1951. Perlite is of volcanic origin. The No Agua mine is in the Taos Plateau volcanic field.
Rockdale	IL	1959	current	41.4972°N 88.1364°W	
Former F. E. Schundler plant that produced Fesco fireproof roof insulation board containing perlite. While the perlite business became part of the JM Celite Division headquartered in Lompoc, the Rockdale plant was transferred to the JM Building Products Division.
Naucalpan	Mexico	1959			
Johns-Manville Mexicana S. A. de C. V. opened on September 25, 1959. It was a small 15 employees automated industrial packings factory.
Franklin	PA	1960		41.4049°N 79.84°W	
JM in March 1960 took over Franklin Plastics Inc in an all-cash acquisition. The plant produced extruded plastic pipe and was assigned to the JM Pipe Division.
Chillicothe	OH	1960		39.34°N 82.9925°W	
Produced asphalt and vinyl asbestos floor tile and opened on Oct 11, 1960. A 57-acre tract 5 miles north of the town on the Scioto River. Increased tile capacity of the company by almost 50%. Construction began in June 1959.
Cleveland	OH	1961			
One of 3 asphalt roofing plants acquired from Celotex in 1961.
Avery	OH	1961			
One of 3 asphalt roofing plants acquired from Celotex in 1961.
Madison	IL	1961			
One of 3 asphalt roofing plants acquired from Celotex in 1961.
Saint-Marcellin	France	1961			
A refractory products plant was acquired in 1961.
Niguarda	Italy	1961			
A refractory products plant was acquired in 1961.
Penbryn	NJ	1963	current	39.7582°N 74.9399°W	
Plant with 200,000sqft main building began operations Oct 3, 1963, the second production unit in December. The plant processed marbles delivered from Parkersburg into foil-faced fiberglass home insulation with fibre diameter of 1/17,000 inch. A third production unit was scheduled to produce pipe covering. In early 1964 the plant was in operation 24/7. The plant was new construction.
Marshville	NC	1963	1969	34.9897°N 80.35257°W	
An asbestos textile plant was taken over from Unarco Industries Inc. (Union Asbestos & Rubber Co). UNARCO had taken over the entire stock of the Carolina Asbestos Co in 1947, with plants at Davidson (1,000 spindles and 8 looms) and Marshville (14 looms). Raybestos Manhattan bought the plant in October 1969. Carolina Asbestos Co. was founded in January 1930 as an offshoot of the Southern Asbestos Co, which was an offshot of the General Asbestos & Rubber Co. Insatiable demand during World War II allowed the company to buy a 30,000sqft plant in Marshville and run it as a weave shed supplied by the Davidson yarn mill. Carolina Asbestos was recreated in the early 1950 as the result of a lawsuit by which Herb Carlough in effect partially reversed the 1947 merger and operated the Davidson plant independently again until it was sold after his retirement to H.K. Porter, Inc. in 1963. The Davidson plant became a feeder for the Porter Co. Charlotte Works (formerly Southern Asbestos Co).
Lawrence	MA	1964			
JM acquired the Melamite Corporation on Jan 13, 1964 in exchange for 60,000 common shares. Melamite became the 12th Manville operating division. The plant produced high-pressure decorative plastic laminate. Capacity was doubled during 1964.
New Orleans	LA	1964			
A small felt mill was taken over to supply its asphalt roofing operations.
Bellegarde	France	1964			
A plastic, cloth and paper plant was acquired.
Santa Catarina	Mexico	1964			
Development of a diatomite mine and mill began in 1963 and opened in 1964. JM had only minority ownership.
Cleburne	TX	1964	current	32.38765°N 97.3954°W	
The plant was a major expansion of fiberglass insulation capacity when it opened in August 1964. Ground was broken in Jan 1964.
Hayward	CA	1965		37.60879°N 122.04182°W	
New asphalt and vinyl asbestos floor tile plant began production in 1965. Construction began in 1964.
Green Cove Springs	FL	1965		29.9832°N 81.67565°W	
Ground was broken Sep 28, 1964 at the intersection of highway 16 and 17 for a asbestos-cement and PVC pipe plant, which began operations in 1965.
Laurinburg	NC	1965			
A friction materials plant producing Cobra asbestos brake shoes for the railroad industries began production in 1965. Construction began in 1964.
Ghent	Belgium	1965	1983		
Asbestos-cement building board plant opened in 1965. Construction began in 1964. Plants in Ghent and Donk were acquired by JM Balmatt in 1983.
Wissembourg	France	1965	1991	49.025°N 7.98°E	
Made perlite filter aids for the sugar, beverage, food and chemical industry. Construction began in 1964. Manville's Celite Division was taken over by Alleghany Corp in 1991.
Lake Myvatn	Iceland	1968	1991	65.64081°N 16.85612°W	
Iceland diatomite: Year / Short tons; <1968 / 0; 1968 / 3,031; 1969 / 8,378; 1970 / 14,593; Year / Tonnes; 2002 / 26,494; 2003 / 27,513; 2004 / 19,332; 2005 / 3,236; Kisilidjan H. F. (Icelandic Diatomite Co) was founded in 1966 as a joint venture of JM and the Icelandic government. The company received a 10-year $850,000 EximBank loan for equipment purchases in the United States, repayment starting in 1968. The cost of the plant was an estimated $3,900,000. Lake Myvatn is some 60 miles below the arctic circle, the plant could only operate during the 6 months summer period, at which time it was active 24/7. The high-grade diatomite was dredged from the bottom of the lake an delivered through a 2-mile pipeline to the processing plant. The product was sold as Hyflo Super-Gel in Europe and was transported 37 miles by truck for transshipment via Húsavík. During 1970, capacity was increased from 13,000tpa to 22,000tpa. Manville's Celite Division was taken over by Alleghany Corp in 1991. As of 2014 Iceland stopped diatomite production in 2005.
Fort Saskatchewan	AB	1969			
Peace River Glass Fibres Ltd was acquired in 1969. Their 72,000sqft plant produced fiberglass and was originally built in 1955 as the first fiberglass plant in Western Canada. It began production in September 1955 processing imported glass rods. A glass melting plant was planned for 1957.
Winder	GA	1969	current	33.9953°N 83.7716°W	
New 340,000sqft fiberglass insulation plant on a 190 acre site under construction in early 1969 was the first of its kind in the state of Georgia.
Edison	NJ	1973		40.53064°N 74.3359°W	
JM acquired Zeston, Inc in 1973 for 180,000 treasury shares. The plant produced PVC insulation and pipe fittings, pipe covers and jacketing systems.
Butner	NC	1973		36.1544°N 78.7214°W	
one of 6 PVC pipe plants opened in 1973 JM was already producing PVC pipe in Denison, Stockton, Green Cove Springs and Long Beach in 1972.
Pueblo West	CO	1973		38.3467°N 104.6523°W	
one of 6 PVC pipe plants opened in 1973. Ground for the $5 million 50,000sqft plant was broken in the fall of 1972, it opened in May 1973. It produced 24 million pounds of pipe per year with 44 employees and in 1977 capacity was increased by 25%.
Wilton	IA	1973		41.5872°N 91.035°W	
one of 6 PVC pipe plants opened in 1973
Tucson	AZ	1973	current	32.325°N 111.0489°W	
one of 6 PVC pipe plants opened in 1973 Company celebrated 50th anniversary in February 2023, and had switched to producing fiberglass.
Brossard	QC	1973		45.4309°N 73.4717°W	
one of 6 PVC pipe plants opened in 1973
Jackson	TN	1973			
one of 6 PVC pipe plants opened in 1973
McNary	OR	1974		45.9244°N 119.2723°W	
one of 7 PVC pipe plants opened in 1973 and 1974
McPherson	KS	1974		38.3858°N 97.61475°W	
Opening ceremony of the fiberglass insulation plant was on Oct 10, 1974.
Innisfail	AB	1977		52.03293°N 113.93885°W	
New $18 million plant for fiberglass insulation began operations in 1977.
Huttig	AR	1979		33.041°N 92.181°W	
Manville invested $15 million in 1981 in a program to increase production from 44 to 67 million board feet, including new machinery to increase efficiency of extraction of products from logs, as well as a collateral increase of wood chips output for conversion in the West Monroe paper mills. The program was expected to last into 1983.
Lillie	LA	1979	1984		
The Olinkraft particle board plant began production in 1971. Was part of Manville in 1982 but in 1984 was owned by James Davison of Ruston, LA and operated by Willamette Industries. The plant was sold to Willamette Industries on Aug 13, 1984.
Etowah	TN	1979			
The plant produced fiber glass mat used in shingles and roll roofing, resulting in more than +50% company-wide for that type of product which was also made in Waterville.
Willows	CA		current	39.5354°N 122.2615°W	
Made fiberglass insulation.
Clinton	MS	1984			
Purchased from Consolidated Packing on Dec 3, 1984.
Bakersfield	CA			35.3115°N 119.068°W	
South Gate	CA		current	33.9547°N 118.19466°W	
The Schumacher Wall Board Corp was enlarging their plant at 4301 Firestone Blvd in 1940. Schumacher was merged into Paraffine Companies, Inc on April 1, 1946. 45,000 shares of Schumacher were exchanged 1-for-1 and Paraffine canceled those 21,000 Schumacher shares it had already owned. Paraffine Companies was incorporated Nov 21, 1917 in Delaware as the consolidation of 7 companies consummated in 1918. Paraffine preferred stock was issued with par equal to tangible asset book value, Paraffine no-par common stock was issued based on earning power (estimated to yield 10% in 1918). Paraffine Companies predecessors: Old company / / Paraffine; Name / Shares / Pfd / Common; Economy Paper Co / 200 / 350 / 900; Northern Bd. and Paper Mills / 920 / 1,196 / 2,300; Coast Waste Products Co / 144 / 144 / 360; Crescent Boxboard Co / 450 / 450 / 675; Southern Board and Paper Mills / 600 / 2,400 / 4,800; R. W. Pridham Co / 1450 / 3,262.5 / 13,050; Calif. Bd. and Paper Mills / 600 / 1,500 / 3,600; Paraffine Paint Co / 15,000 / 30,000 / 60,000; The company made a revenue of $19,529,807 in 1927. Paraffine was renamed Pabco Products Inc on Nov 1, 1950, which was renamed to Fibreboard Paper Products Corp on May 1, 1956.
Plattsburgh	NY	1996	current	44.6914°N 73.5°W	
JM acquired Nord Bitumi in 1996
Richland	MS	1997	current	32.265°N 90.168°W	
JM acquired Ergon Nonwovens, Inc, a manufacturer of meltblown nonwoven products, in Q1/1997.

The research center was built beginning in September 1945. It was across the Raritan River from the huge Manville plant.

The Coalinga Asbestos Company, a joint venture of J-M Corp and the Kern County Land Co operated a mill some 16 miles northwest of Coalinga, California and processed ore mined in surrounding open pit mines from 1962 to 1974. An EPA cleanup ended in 1995 and a cleanup of a related site (shipping facilities) in the town of Coalinga ended in 1993.

== Statistics ==
Profits are after amortization, depreciation, taxes and before preferred dividends. The company issued no long term debt (bonds) at all before 1947 and the numbers reflect income that would have been available for interest. The significant revenue of the Canadian subsidiary is included in $US in the consolidated figures.

Consolidated Earnings
Year	Revenue	Profit
1906	$5,700,000	$456,000
1907	7,032,165	525,000
1908	5,806,782	252,000
1909	7,577,961	343,632
1910	9,850,387	624,119
1911	11,155,190	730,178
1912	13,747,749	915,193
1913	16,635,119	946,470
1914	15,238,136	275,134
1915	15,671,151	662,498
1916	22,284,712	2,629,221
1917	29,881,979	2,189,687
1918	36,540,000	2,869,946
1919	34,338,966	2,582,994
1920	45,138,181	3,703,314
1921	26,400,909	679,473
1922	30,624,202	2,262,528
1923	38,261,025	3,662,009
1924	37,627,084	2,407,504
1925	39,201,263	3,017,207
1926	45,042,327	4,856,033
1927	44,313,702	4,108,159
1928	47,945,559	5,589,399
1929	61,994,885	6,591,917
1930	49,492,048	3,268,123
1931	33,481,300	583,792
1932	20,409,206	—2,680,873
1933	21,232,272	105,331
1934	27,300,248	749,803
1935	34,646,854	2,164,858
1936	48,922,011	4,373,707
1937	60,173,392	5,451,844
1938	46,890,148	1,455,302
1939	52,047,720	4,127,691
1940	61,761,236	(Note: After WW2 excess profit taxes)5,882,071
1941	92,852,483	5,967,145
1942	108,021,383	5,570,192
1943	107,418,305	4,655,280
1944	101,211,499	5,476,213
1945	85,993,676	5,096,462
1946	92,049,044	5,836,613
1947	133,885,412	9,486,633
1948	173,458,033	15,440,475
1949	162,580,782	14,368,926
1950	203,272,945	22,814,491
1951	238,000,000	24,500,000
1952	244,700,000	22,600,000
1953	252,600,000	19,700,000
1954	253,200,000	16,700,000
1955	284,700,000	23,500,000
1956	310,400,000	25,000,000
1957	308,300,000	17,800,000
1958	331,742,726	23,373,841
1959	377,562,000	31,616,000
1960	365,175,000	26,508,000
1961	377,800,000	23,900,000
1962	392,300,000	23,900,000
1963	414,900,000	27,700,000
1964	458,879,000	32,065,000
1965	480,180,000	34,134,000
...
1969	648,300,000	46,200,000
1970	620,400,000	37,300,000
1971	696,300,000	43,600,000
1972	798,706,000	49,550,000
1973	905,417,000	55,784,000
1974	1,105,508,000	71,883,000
1975	1,107,012,000	38,413,000
1976	1,308,771,000	53,417,000
1977	1,461,432,000	102,627,000
1978	1,648,599,000	121,602,000
1979	2,276,429,000	114,606,000
1980	2,266,804,000	80,636,000
1981	2,186,005,000	60,320,000
1982	1,684,588,000	—97,584,000
1983	1,729,465,000	67,194,000
1984	1,814,184,000	77,227,000
...
1995	1,391,522,000	115,995,000
1996	1,552,429,000	90,486,000
1997	1,647,645,000	150,000,000
1998	1,781,179,000	180,946,000
1999	2,161,786,000	256,086,000

Revenue ($ million) by Business Segment
	1980	1979	1978
Fiberglass	610	573	514
Forest Prods	508	497	0
Non-Fiber Insulation	279	268	231
Roofing	250	273	254
Pipe	220	305	303
Asbestos Fiber	159	168	157
Specialty Products and Services	341	308	291
Corporate	9	11	20
minus intersegment sales	(84)	(106)	(94)
Total	2,292	2,297	1,677

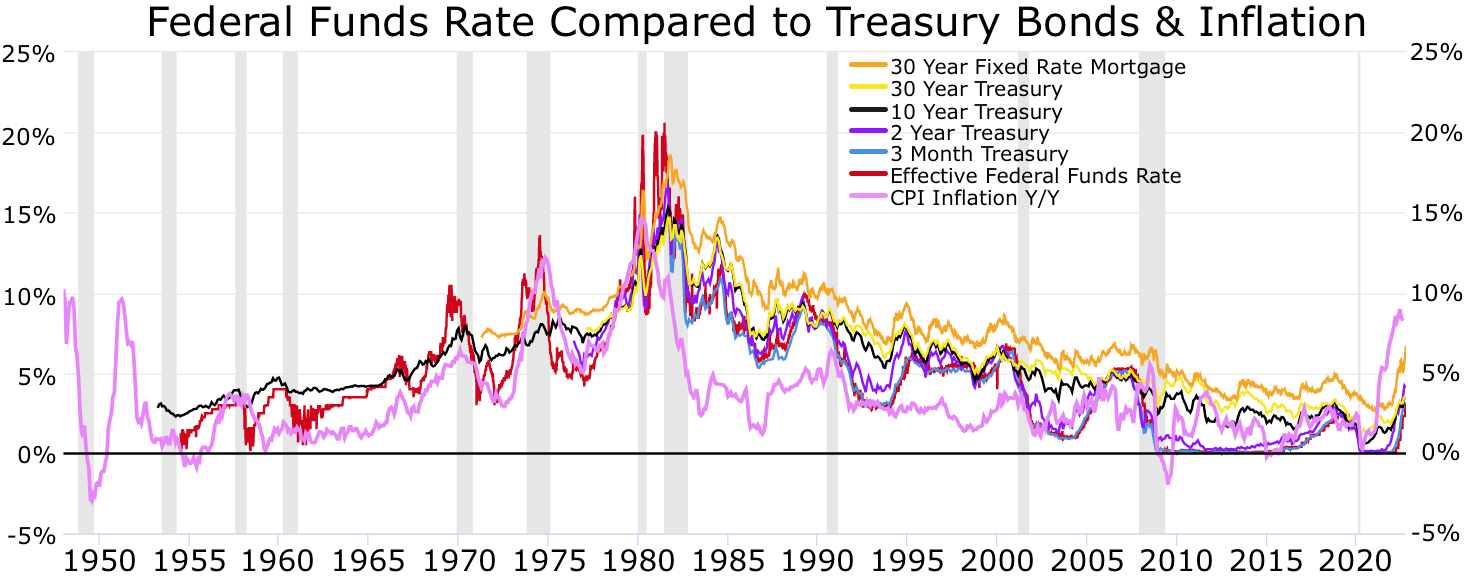

The preferred stock was issued into a climate of sharply rising interest rates and quickly lost value. Manville did not miss a dividend payment before 1982. Common stock paid 48 cents quarterly, preferred paid $1.35.

15-year treasury bonds sold at a yield of 9.0% in January 1979 and 11.8% (20-year) in January 1981 against a nominal yield of Manville's preferred of 8.3%.

Manville stock price range
		$5.40 pref				common			
		Q1	Q2	Q3	Q4	Q1	Q2	Q3	Q4
1979	High	62 1/2	64 5/8	64	59	25 1/4	25 3/4	27 3/4	26 1/2
1979	Low	61 1/4	61 5/8	58 3/4	54 1/8	22 1/2	23 1/4	24	21 7/8
1980	High	55	56 1/8	52 1/2	48 1/2	24 7/8	23 1/4	31 3/8	29 5/8
1980	Low	42	41 1/4	46	41 1/2	18 1/4	18 3/8	22 1/2	21 5/8
1981	High	46 1/2	43 3/8	40	36	26 1/2	25 1/2	21	16 1/8
1981	Low	42 1/2	39 1/2	32 1/4	31	21	19 5/8	14 3/8	13 3/4
1982
1983	High	24 7/8	33 1/4	29	33 3/4	13 3/8	16 5/8	15 3/4	13 3/8
1983	Low	17 3/4	24 1/8	26	23 5/8	10	11 1/8	10 5/8	10
1984	High	28 1/8	28 1/4	24 7/8	22	13 5/8	11 1/4	9 3/8	7 1/4
1984	Low	23 1/2	22 1/2	20 5/8	18 1/4	9 3/4	7 5/8	6	5 5/8

The Deferred Expenditure Fund was created on Jan 20, 1943.

WW2 Deferred Expenditure Account on Dec 31
	1948	1947	1946	1945	1944	1943	1942
Cash	$802	$482	$388,606	$1,252			
US tax notes series C	0	2,720,625	8,353,246	12,258,400			
Treasury bonds incl. interest	2,752,820	8,823,569	15,402,989	16,743,034			
Excess Profit Tax refunds	649,549	843,635	845,043	1,751,781			
Federal Tax refund carryback	2,871,299	2,871,299	2,814,149	1,200,000			
Total	6,274,470	15,259,610	27,804,033	31,954,467	14,022,449	11,493,670	1,188,237
during year
Deposits			3,324,132		2,647,420		
Withdrawals			7,486,049		18,591		
