= Frank McEwan =

Scottish footballer

Personal information
- Full name: Francis Fowler McEwan
- Date of birth: 28 August 1915
- Place of birth: Airdrie, Scotland
- Date of death: 21 September 1944 (aged 29)
- Place of death: Donk, Belgium
- Position: Inside left

Senior career*
Years	Team	Apps	(Gls)
–1935	Whitburn Junior		
1935–1938	Airdrieonians	59	(22)
1938–1944	Tottenham Hotspur	0	(0)
1942	→ Hamilton Academical (guest)	4	(0)
1942	→ Airdrieonians (guest)		
- * Club domestic league appearances and goals

Francis Fowler McEwan (28 August 1915 – 21 September 1944) was a Scottish professional footballer who played in the Scottish League for Airdrieonians as a forward.

== Personal life ==
At the outbreak of the Second World War, McEwan enlisted in the British Army. As a rifleman in the Rifle Brigade, he was deployed to Europe in July 1944 and died of wounds in the area of Donk on 21 September 1944. He was buried in Mol Communal Cemetery.

== Career statistics ==
Appearances and goals by club, season and competition
Club	Season	League			National Cup		Total	
Club	Season	Division	Apps	Goals	Apps	Goals	Apps	Goals
Airdrieonians	1935–36	Scottish First Division	3	0	0	0	3	0
Airdrieonians	1936–37	Scottish Second Division	20	9	0	0	20	9
Airdrieonians	1937–38	Scottish Second Division	28	11	0	0	28	11
Airdrieonians	1938–39	Scottish Second Division	8	2	0	0	8	2
Career total			59	22	0	0	59	22
