= PCCP =

PCCP may refer to:

- Physical Chemistry Chemical Physics, a scientific journal
- From Potential Conflict to Cooperation Potential within the International Hydrological Programme of the UNESCO
- Prestressed concrete cylinder pipe

== See also ==
- PCC(p)
