= Beverly Bender =

American sculptor (1918–2012)

Beverly Sterl Bender (January 4, 1918 – August 13, 2012) was an American sculptor.

Born in Washington, D.C., Bender received her bachelor's degree from Knox College and studied sculpture at the Art Students League of New York, the Sculpture Center, and the American Museum of Natural History. During World War II she worked in testing for Chance-Vought, and later spent thirty-two years in the art department of Johns-Manville; she created miniature models of children at first in her off-hours before turning to the sculpture, in stone, of animals. She exhibited widely throughout the United States during her career, and served on the boards of the Society of Animal Artists, the Catherine Lorillard Wolfe Art Club, and the Pen and Brush Art Club; she also belonged to the American Artists Professional League and Knickerbocker Artists. She received a number of awards from a variety of organizations during her career, including an Alumni Achievement Award from her alma mater, in 1978. Her work can be seen in a number of private collections and at Mystic Seaport. Bender's preferred medium was stone, and her preferred subject was animals. A number of student awards at Knox College, endowed by her, bear her name.
