= Hot tapping =

Connecting to piping without stopping flow

Hot tapping, or pressure tapping, is the method of making a connection to existing piping or pressure vessels without the interrupting or emptying of that section of pipe or vessel. This means that a pipe or tank can continue to be in operation whilst maintenance or modifications are being done to it. The process is also used to drain off pressurized casing fluids and add test points or various sensors such as temperature and pressure. Hot taps can range from a ½ inch hole designed for something as simple as quality control testing, up to a 48-inch tap for the installation of a variety of ports, valves, t-sections or other pipes.

== Procedures ==
A. A hot tap saddle, service saddle or welded threadolet, valve installed, assembly is pressure tested and hot tap machine attached.

B. Valve opened, hot tap completed, coupon or cut portion retained by latches on pilot drill. Pressure is contained within the hot tapping machine.

C. Cutter and coupon retracted and valve closed. Fluid is drained and hot tapping machine is removed. The tapped valve is now ready for the contractor's tie-in or IFT's linestop/stopple equipment to be inserted.

Hot tapping is also the first procedure in line stopping, where a hole saw is used to make an opening in the pipe, so a line plugging head can be inserted.

=== Non-welding situations ===
Situations in which welding operations are prohibited on equipment which contains:

- Mixtures of gases or vapours within their flammable range or which may become flammable as a result of heat input in welding operations.
- Substances which may undergo reaction or decomposition leading to a dangerous increase in pressure, explosion or attack on metal. In this context, attention is drawn to the possibility that under certain combinations of concentration, temperature and pressure, acetylene, ethylene and other unsaturated hydrocarbons may decompose explosively, initiated by a welding hot spot.
- Oxygen-enriched atmospheres in the presence of hydrocarbons which may be present either in the atmosphere or deposited on the inside surface of the equipment or pipe.
- Compressed air in the presence of hydrocarbons which may be present either in the air or deposited on the inside surfaces of the equipment or pipe.
- Gaseous mixtures in which the partial pressure of hydrogen exceeds 700 kPa gauge, except where evidence from tests has demonstrated that hot-tapping can be done safely.

Based on the above, welding on equipment or pipe which contains hazardous substances or conditions as listed below (even in small quantities) shall not be performed unless positive evidence has been obtained that welding/hot tapping can be applied safely.

== Substances ==
- Acetylene
- Acetonitrile
- Butadiene
- Caustic soda*
- Chlorine
- Compressed air at a pressure in excess of 3000 kPa gauge;
- Ethylene
- Ethylene oxide
- Fat/lean DEA/MEA;
- High pressure steam (pressure in excess of 5000 kPa (ga))
- Hydraulic fluid
- Hydrogen (partial pressure in excess of 700 kPa (ga))
- Hydrogen sulphide*
- Hydrofluoric acid
- Oxygen
- Propene
- Propene oxide
- Sulphuric acid
- Toxic substances.*

Constraints based on general hazard in the event of line puncturing during welding, not the welding process. Conditions:

- Vacuum conditions;
- Dissolved hydrogen in the pipe wall (e.g. due to service history);
- Pyrophoric scale deposits.

Note: The above list is not exhaustive, but gives an indication only.
