= Donk, Antwerp =

Donk
- Village
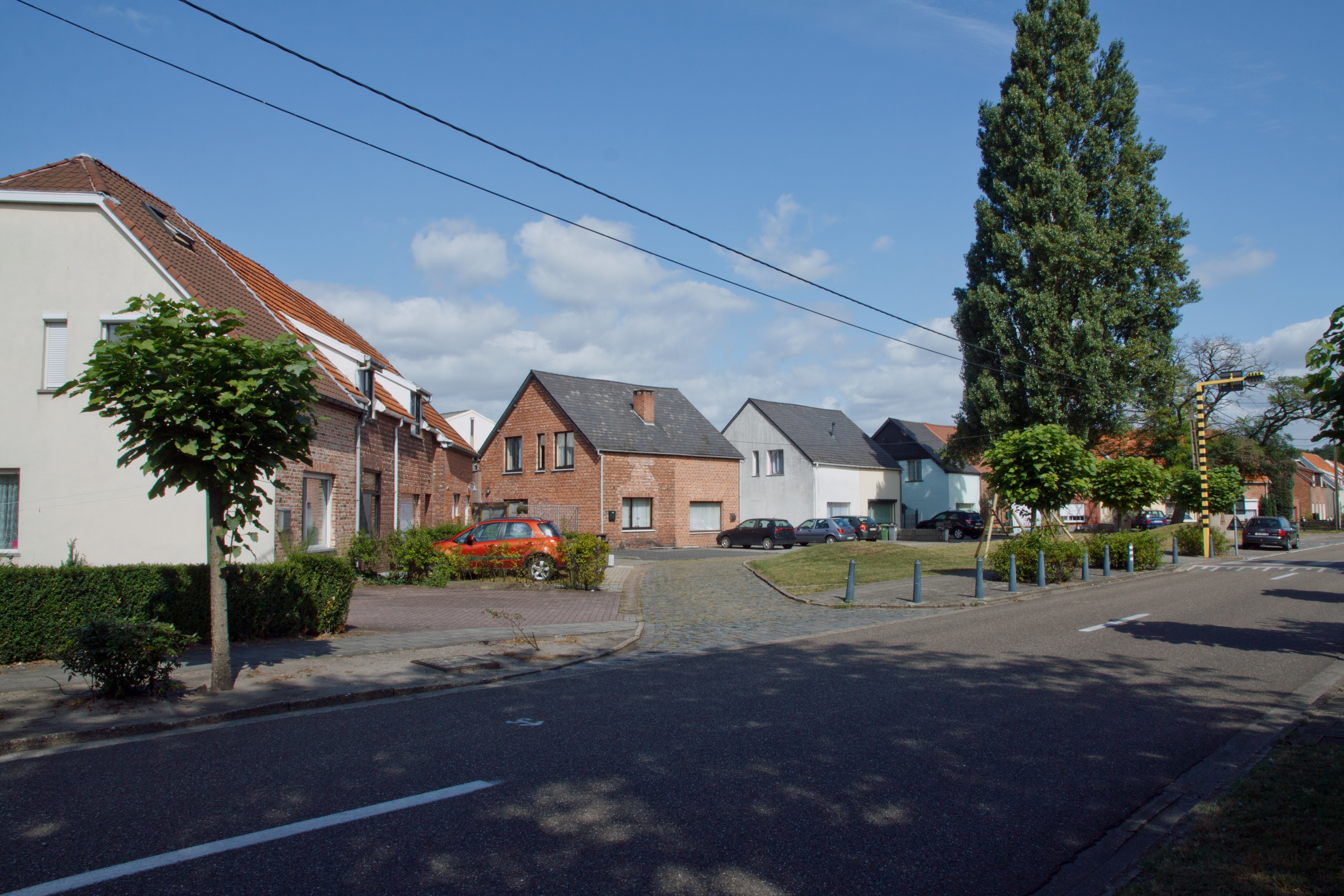
- Houses in Donk

- Location within Belgium
- Coordinates: 51°10′42″N 5°5′17″E
- Country: Belgium
- Province: Antwerp
- Municipality: Mol

Area
  - Total: 3.49 km^{2} (1.35 sq mi)

Population (2021)
  - Total: 1,300
  - Density: 370/km^{2} (960/sq mi)
- Postal code: 2400

Donk is a village in the municipality of Mol in the province of Antwerp in Belgium. Donk resides at the southern side of the Bocholt–Herentals Canal and is an industrial area, especially in past.

== Industrial evolution ==
The Bocholt–Herentals Canal was constructed in 1846, the same year that "Turnhoutse Baan", a road between Turnhout and the centre of Mol, which crossed the canal was also constructed. This was the start of the industrial evolution in Donk. In 1896 a railway was built next to Turnhoutse Baan but this was already closed some decades later. It took until 1986 until the tracks were removed.

In 1860, the exploitation of white sand started and some of such companies raised. A notable factory was Sablières et Carrières Réunies (SCR), founded in 1872." In 1921, it took over the shares of competitor Anciennes Sablières Stanislas Emsens. In 1955, the company was renamed to Sibelco. Another notable company was Grandes Sablières de la Campine, founded in 1882. Although it got bankrupt some decades later the company activities led to the creation of a huge lake of 210 acres, named Miramar, which is now used as a recreation lake for water sports. Another of such lake, Zandkot, is around 20 acres. This is currently used by the nuclear plants for water cooling. There were a lot of other sand winning companies but only Sibelco remains.

Besides the sand winning companies a lot of other companies arose. Notables are

- Betonwerken van Moll, founded in 1911 and specialized in cement. In 1923, the company was renamed to N.V. Beton en Mollith and once again renamed in 1930 to N.V. Johns-Manville and started with the production of asbestos.
- Verreries de Liège et de la Campine, a glasswork founded in 1922, later on renamed to Verlica and then Verlipack. The company was shut down in 1999. The company halls were renovated and converted into a business park named Verlipark. Parts of the business park can be bought/hired.
- Société d'Electricité de la Campine, an electric power plant on black coal founded in 1929. It originally had a capacity of 20 MW. In 1956, the company was taken over by EBES which is now known as Electrabel. The power plant had two chimneys of 410 feet and a cooling tower of 246 feet. Both towers could be seen from far. The power plant was shut down in 2010 as it produced too much carbon dioxide. The premises were bought by VITO who deconstructed the power plant. On 10 July 2014, the chimneys and cooling tower were blown up with dynamite.

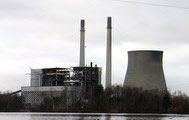
The former electric power plant with its cooling tower and chimneys. The plant was demolished and the towers and cooling tower blown up with dynamite in June 2014

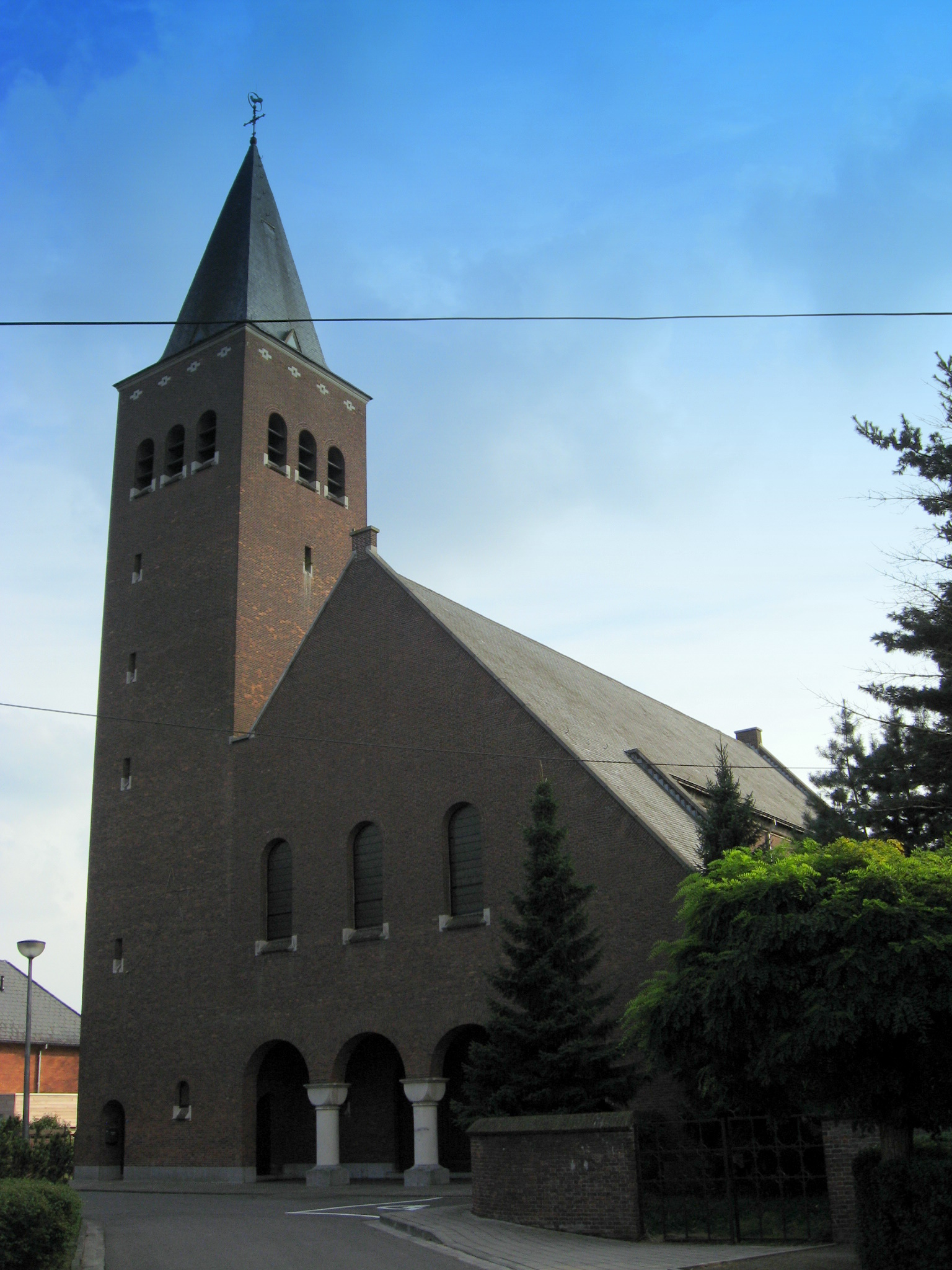
Sint-Antonius Church, to be profaned at end of 2016 and to be reassigned as a community centre

- SCK•CEN, a nuclear test plant founded in 1952. Some other companies related to nuclear power are Eurochemic in Dessel and IRMM (Institute for Reference Materials and Measurements). Over the years SCK•CEN did a lot more than only research on nuclear activities. At end of the 1980s it was decided all activities not related to nuclear purposes are no longer core business. These non-core activities were taken over by the newly founded VITO.

== Township ==
Although there was industry as from 1860 it took until 1900 before Emiel Becquaert (Dessel, 1865 – Donk, 1932), then owner of SCR, and the priest of nearby township Achterbos decided to establish an area with working-class houses. These houses still exist and are in the eastern part of Donk.

In 1949, the church Sint-Antonius was built. According to rumors it was built upon a huge pit which was created by a bomb during World War II. The presence of the pit was a reduction in digging costs. Furthermore, the pit was only about 100 metres from the working-class houses and thus an ideal place.

Between 1954 en 1961, a residential village, Atoomwijk (also known as Atoomdorp), was built in the west part of Donk around the nuclear sites. The design was created by architect Jacques Wybauw. This village contains apartments, dormitoria, terraced houses and some villas. These buildings are owned by the nuclear companies and they initially rented it to their temporary workers, students, foreign workers... Later on, the houses were also rented to non-employees. In 2008 the owners decided not to invest anymore in the buildings as the cost for renovation was too much and renting houses was not considered to be a core activity. It was announced some of the buildings were to be pulled down, but an action committee was set up to classify Atoomwijk as cultural heritage. Upon today no further action was taken to decommission Atoomwijk although there is now a lot of vacancy due to the announcement. It is still possible to turn in a request to rent property.

Between 1960 and 1965, another neighbourhood was built by Molse Bouwmaatschappij in the eastern part, adjacent to the church and working-class houses. These terraced houses resemble Atoomwijk. Initial idea of Molse Bouwmaatschappij was to rent/sell these houses to permanent employees of the nuclear sites although this was not a prerequisite.

Thanks to Emiel Becquaert the township got an elementary school and kindergarten. Both schools were taken over by the catholic St.-Jan Berchmanscollege which had an elementary and high school in the centre of Mol. In 2000, St.-Jan Berchmanscollege closed the schools at Donk. These were taken over by the elementary school of Mol-Sluis and thus became a state school. Due to insufficient children (due to aging inhabitants) the school was closed in June 2009.

=== Plans for third residential area ===
In 2012, a predesign of a new social residential area and cultural centre was proposed. The current catholic meeting place, school, library, ... will be demolished. A part of the buildings of the local boyscouts is also impacted. They will move to the former clergy house. A new cultural centre will be built behind the clergy house. Later on the plan was redesigned. Due to cultural heritage the historic school buildings and nunnery will remain and become apartments. The church will be profaned and becomes the community centre.

== Nature ==
Besides the lakes, created by the sand winning industry, a large part of Achterbosheide is at the west of the village. This area contains conifer forests and heath. Almost all of it is owned by SCK•CEN but a big part of it is accessible for public.
