= Transite =

Term for a type of cement products

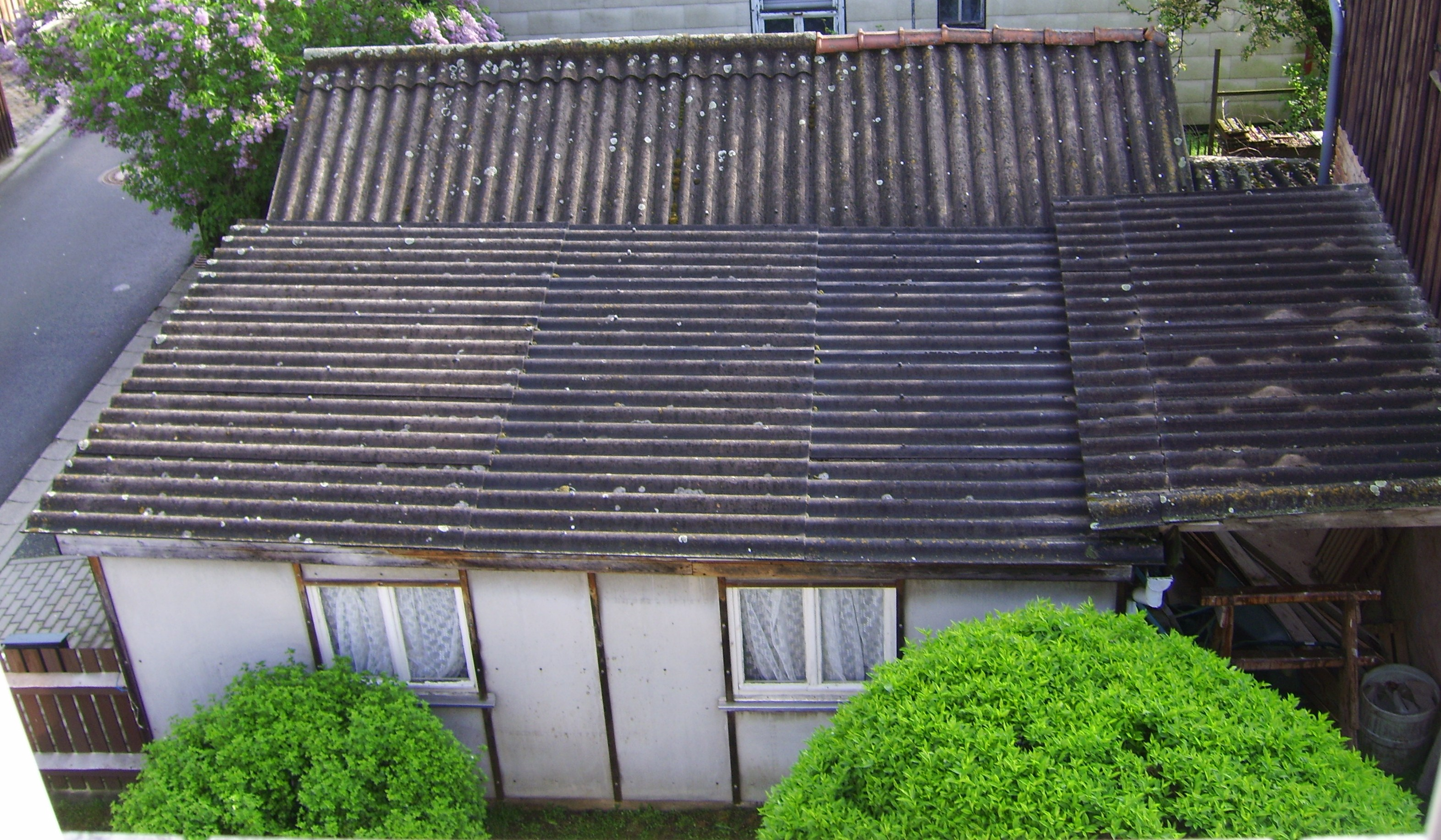
An example of cement-asbestos corrugated and board products, possibly transite

Transite originated as the trademark "Transite Asbestos Wood" (Johns Manville Incorporated applied for registration on March 21, 1923 and claimed use since 1907; was used in an advertisement in 1909). Was also used as the brand "Transite Pipe" by Johns-Manville for an asbestos-cement pipe, produced under a license obtained in 1929 from the Eternit Pietra Artificiale, S.A. of Genoa, Italy. According to a 1958 Johns-Manville press pamphlet, the term derives from the Brooklyn Rapid Transit Company, for which J-M in 1904 produced a flat asbestos-cement board to insulate trains that were newly electrified against fire from sparks and short circuits.

In time it became a generic term for other companies' similar asbestos-cement products, and later an even more generic term for a hard, fireproof composite material, fibre cement boards, typically used in wall construction. It can also be found in insulation, siding, roof gutters, and cement wallboard. The more prevalent transite found in wall construction and roofing tiles for example, will last anywhere from 50 years to over 100 years.

The use of asbestos, a proven carcinogen, to manufacture transite was phased out in the 1980s. It was replaced by crystalline silica, which the International Agency for Research on Cancer has classified as being carcinogenic to humans (Class 1). Crystalline silica is also known to cause silicosis, a non-cancerous lung disease.

== Historic ==
Originally, transite had between 12-50% of asbestos fiber added to a cement base to provide tensile strength (similar to the rebar in reinforced concrete), and other materials. It was frequently used for such purposes as furnace flues, roof shingles, siding, soffit and fascia panels, and wallboard for areas where fire retardancy is particularly important. It was also used in walk-in coolers made in large supermarkets in the 1960s, 1970s and even the 1980s. Other uses included roof drain piping, water piping, sanitary sewer drain piping, laboratory fume hood panels, ceiling tiles, landscape edging, and HVAC ducts. Because cutting, breaking, and machining asbestos-containing transite releases carcinogenic asbestos fibers into the air, its use has fallen out of favor. Despite asbestos-containing transite being phased out, it is still not banned in the United States; some 230,000 deaths have been attributed to it. Demolition of older buildings containing transite materials, particularly siding made from transite, requires special precautions and disposal techniques to protect workers and the public.

== Today ==
The transite that is produced today is made without asbestos. Transite HT and Transite 1000 are currently available fiber cement boards that contain crystalline silica, which the International Agency for Research on Cancer has classified as being carcinogenic to humans (Class 1). Crystalline silica is also known to cause silicosis, a non-cancerous lung disease.

== See also ==
- Asbestos cement
