= Chrysotile, Arizona =

Former mining town in Gila County

- Populated place
- Location within the state of Arizona Chrysotile (the United States)
- Coordinates: 33°44′25″N 110°34′00″W
- Country: United States
- State: Arizona
- County: Gila
- Elevation: 4,678 ft (1,426 m)
- Time zone: UTC-7 (Mountain (MST))
  - Summer (DST): UTC-7 (MST)
- Area code: 928
- FIPS code: 04-13175
- GNIS feature ID: 24368

Chrysotile is a former mining town in Gila County, Arizona, United States. It has an estimated elevation of 4,678 feet (1,426 m) above sea level.
