= White Hills (Santa Barbara County) =

County in California

- Location within California Location within the United States

Highest point
- Elevation: 233 m (764 ft)

Geography
- Country: United States
- State: California
- District: Santa Barbara County
- Range coordinates: 34°36′18″N 120°26′09″W
- Topo map: USGS Lompoc Hills

The White Hills are a low mountain range in the Transverse Ranges, in Santa Barbara County, California south of the town of Lompoc and east of Vandenberg Air Force Base.
