= Prestressed concrete cylinder pipe =

Prestressed concrete cylinder pipe (PCCP) is a common variety of large-diameter concrete pressure pipe used for transporting water and wastewater. PCCP is typical manufactured according to the American Water Works Association (AWWA) standard C304. PCCP is a composite structure that is composed of a concrete core, high-tensile prestressed steel wires, a thin steel cylinder, and mortar coating. It is widely used globally in water systems infrastructure.
