= Lucien Hoffman =

Belgian sculptor

- Born: 1891; Brussels, Belgium
- Died: 1951 (aged 59–60); Woluwe-Saint-Pierre
- Education: Académie Royale des Beaux-Arts in Brussels
- Known for: Portraits, busts, and bas-reliefs
- Notable work: Battle of Saint Georges

Lucien Hoffman (born in Brussels in 1891, died in Woluwe-Saint-Pierre in 1951) was a Belgian sculptor, pupil of Victor Rousseau.

== Biography ==
Lucien Hoffman is the son of Guillaume-François Hoffman, painter and professor of anatomy (sometimes called Frans Hoffman, born in 1863) and the brother of the painter and designer Charles Hoffman (1900-1973).

Lucien Hoffman was a student at the Académie Royale des Beaux-Arts in Brussels from 1909 to 1914 and from 1918 to 1920.

He was a professor in this academy from 1922 to 1951. During this period, he regularly participated in the triennial exhibitions which took place in Ghent, Antwerp and Brussels.

He maintains close contact with the painter Jacob Smits, for whom he sculpted his portrait in 1925.

== Achievements ==
Lucien Hoffman's work is mostly portraits, busts, and bas-reliefs

He is the author of the Battle of Saint Georges, one of the two bas-reliefs bordering the monument dedicated to général Dossin de Saint-Georges (1854-1936), located near the porch of the Cambre Abbey in Ixelles.

His sculptures (as well as those of other artists) also decorate the city hall of Forest

== Honours ==
- 1932 : Commander in the Order of Leopold.
