= Jakob Smits =

Dutch painter

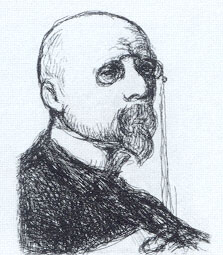
Self-portrait (date unknown)

Jakob Smits or Jacob Smits (Rotterdam, 9 July 1855 – Achterbos (Mol), 15 February 1928) was a Dutch-Flemish painter.

== Background and early life ==
He was born a son of a decorator. Jakob studied in Rotterdam at the academy and helped his father in the decoration business. From 1873 to 1876 he studied at the Academy in Brussels, and after in Munich (1878–1880), Vienna (1880) and Rome (1880). In 1882 Jakob married his cousin Antje Doetje Kramer. They settled in Amsterdam where Smits worked as a painter. He carried out, among other things, tasks for the museum Boijmans-Van Beuningen in Rotterdam. Out of the marriage of Jakob and Antje were produced two children, Theodora and Annie. In 1884, the couple divorced.

== Notable achievements and associations ==
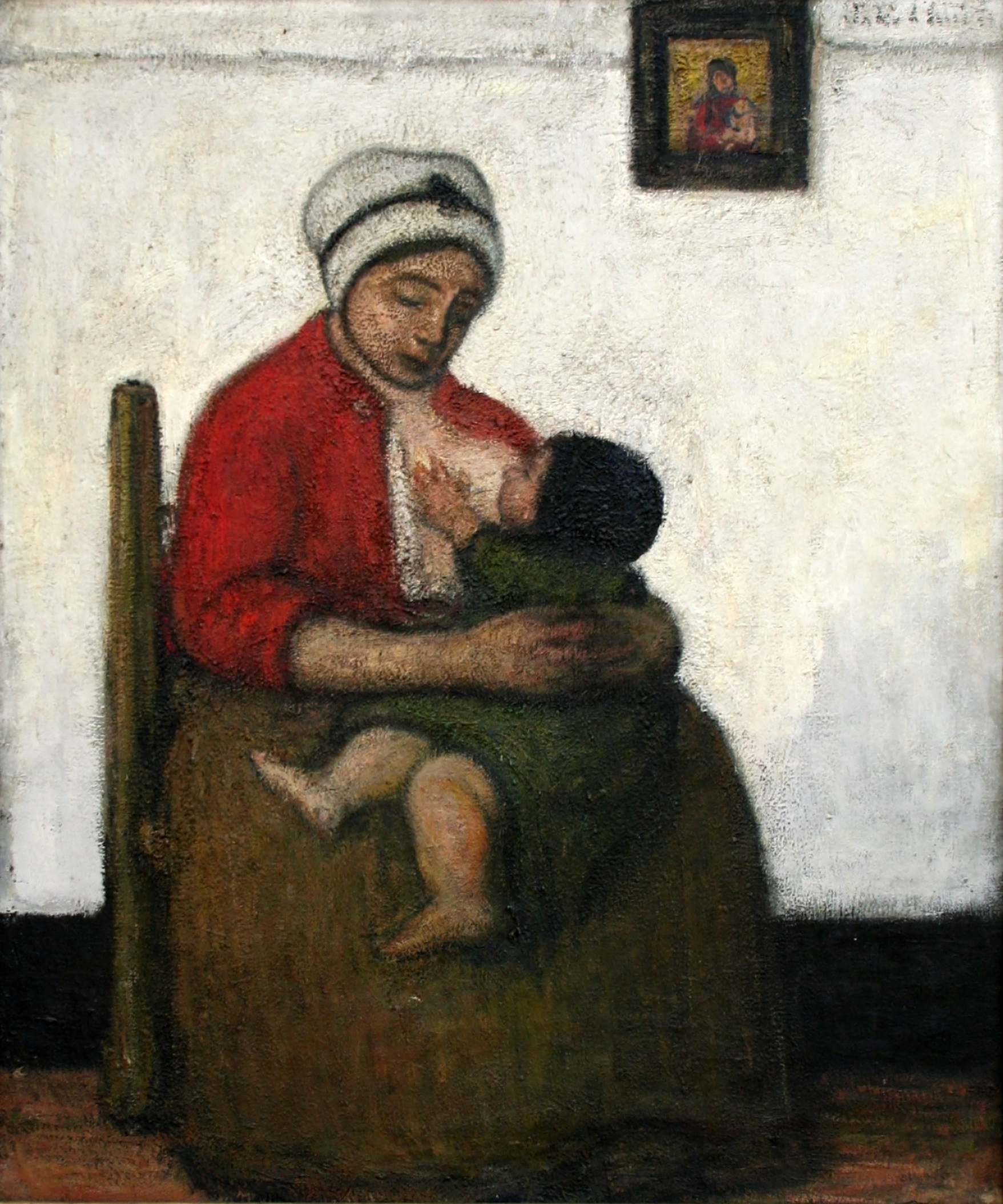
Maternity in Red

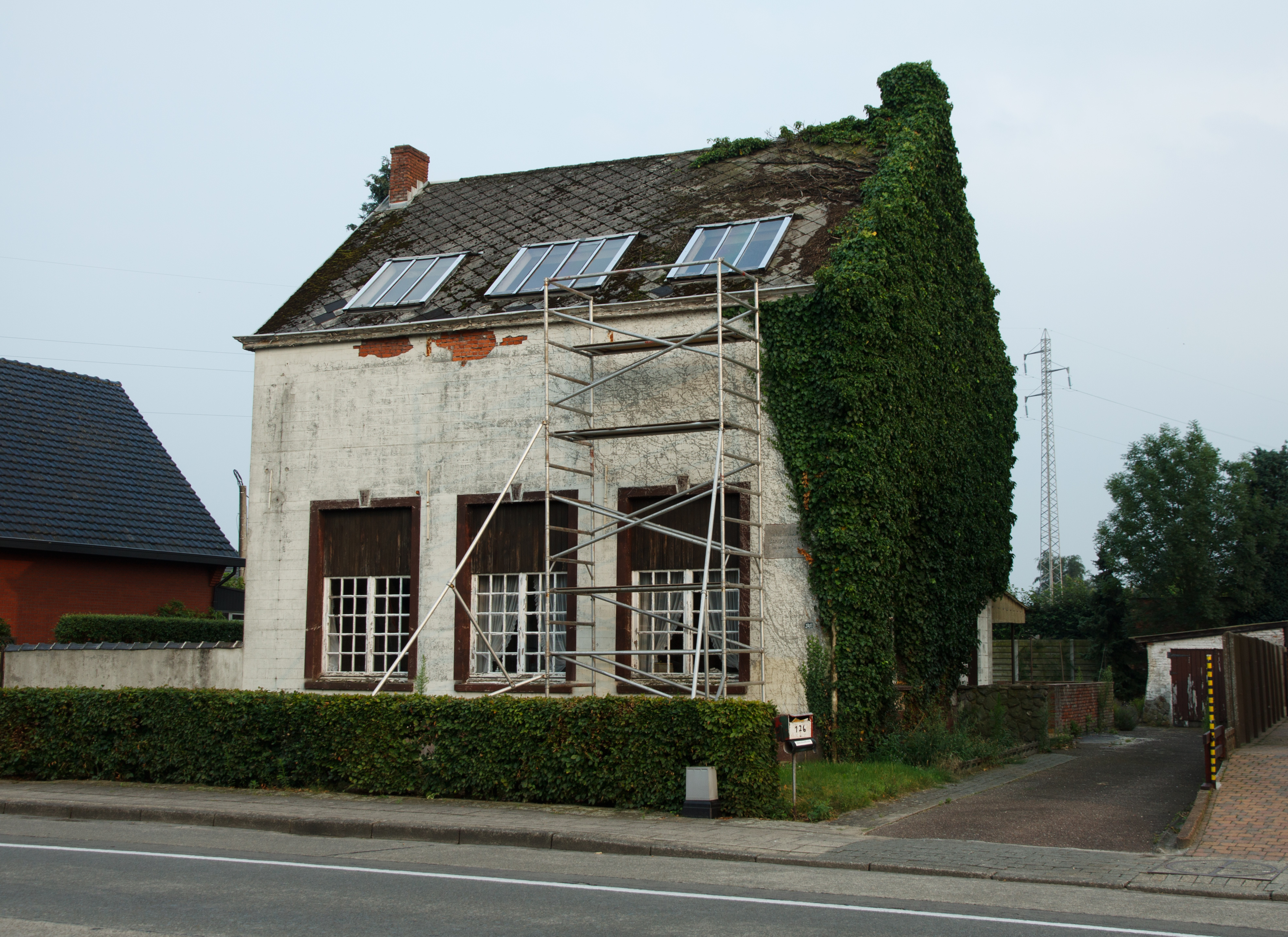
Boerenhuis, Jacob Smits's atelier in Mol-Achterbos

Jakob Smits moved to Blaricum and in Haarlem became director of the Nijverheids- en Decoratieschool (E: Industry and Decoration school). He got to know Albert Neuhuys, a painter of The Hague School, and together they made excursions to Drenthe and the Campine in Belgium. Jakob Smits became impressed by the Campine landscape and he established himself in 1888, definitively in Achterbos (Mol). He paid 2,000 Belgian francs for a small farm which he developed to his Malvinahof. In the same year he married Malvina Dedeyn, the daughter of a Brussels lawyer, who is disinherited because of this marriage. Smits lived in poverty while he worked tirelessly for what he calls my simple work, symbolic, poetic and real. In 1897, he received a gold medal for his exhibitions of large water-colour paintings on a gold background in Munich and Dresden. He also painted many portraits, especially of Malvina and of their children Boby, Marguerite and Kobe. In 1899 destiny struck: in a few days he lost his daughter Alice and his wife. In 1901, Smits married Josine Van Cauteren. In the same year he held his first individual exposition in Antwerp. There he obtained much praise of colleagues and critics but found no buyers for his work. The exhibited work De vader van de veroordeelde (E: the father of the convict) was acquired later that year by the Museum of Brussels.

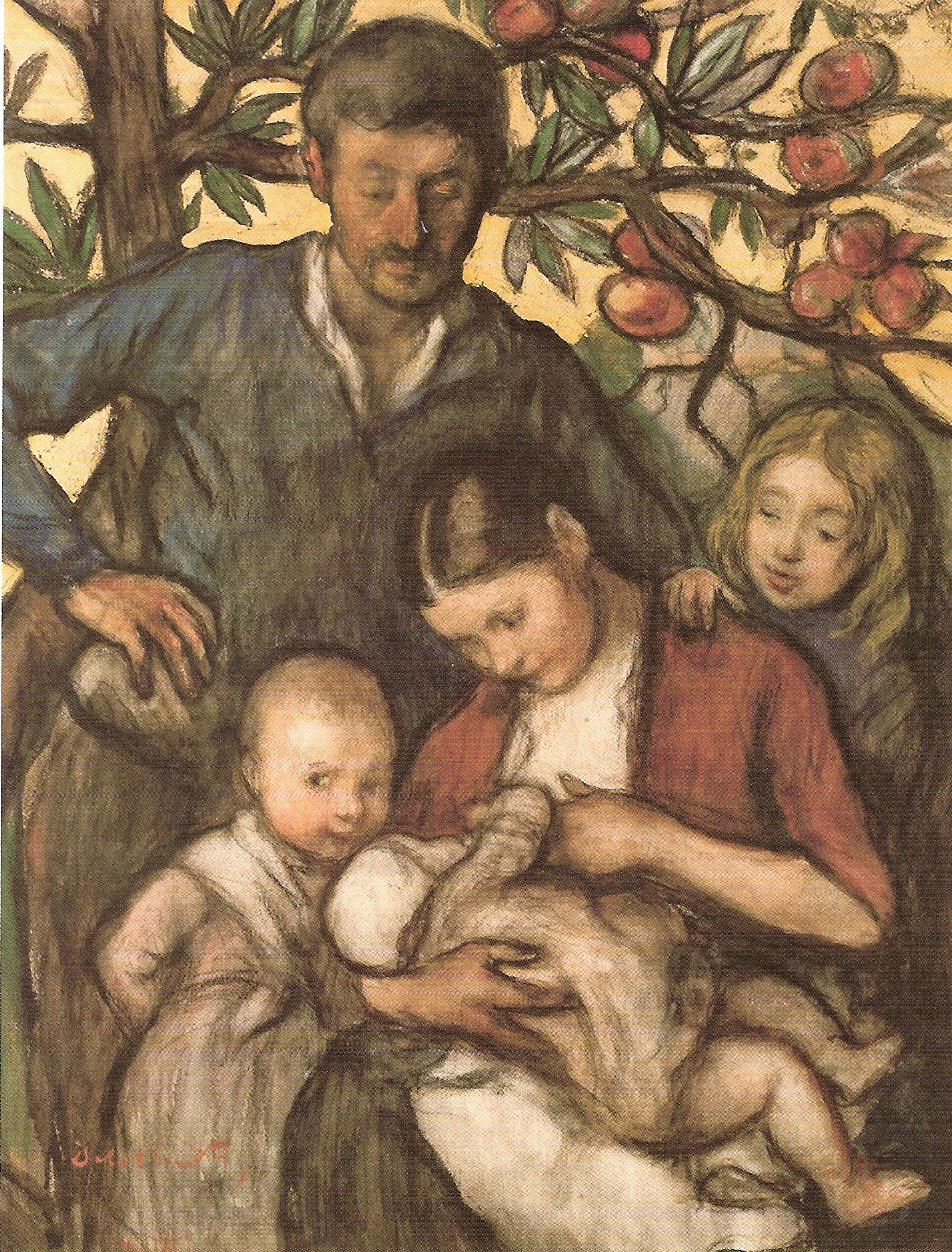
Spring

Smits financial situation improved somewhat, but his family was put heavily on the test. In 1903 both his parents were ruined by a robbery and as a result, he had nine family members to maintain. At the request of the municipal authorities of Mol, in 1907 Smits arranged an international exhibition of artists who came to paint landscapes in Mol and its surroundings. The artist Paula Van Rompa-Zenke belonged to the arranging committee. There were no less than 68 painters participating, with Germans, Dutch, and Americans coming to Mol. The term Molse School was born. In 1910, Smits published an album with 25 engravings, which was dedicated to Queen Elisabeth. In 1912, the young Dirk Baksteen became a student of Smits.

In 1914, Smits stopped his production of art work. He became President of the Comité voor hulpverlening en voedselvoorziening van het canton Mol (E: Committee for assistance and food supplies of the canton Mol). After World War I he continued his work with a totally new vision and style as an engraver and painter. As from 1923 his health deteriorated. Smits suffered from a painful cancer of his jaw.

== Death and legacy ==
On 15 February 1928 he died of a heart disease and he was buried on the church court of Achterbos (Mol). On his sepulchre stands a bronze Mother and Child of George Minne. He lies interred with some other members of the Molse School. Jakob Smits, who became a Belgian in 1902, was a knight in the Order of Leopold (1903), Officer in the Order of the Crown (1919) and Commander in the Order of the Crown (1927). His wife Josine survived him 28 years and after her death in 1956 the Malvinahof was sold. In 1977, in the converted old parish of Mol-Sluis the municipal Jakob Smitsmuseum was opened.

== Work ==
Oeuvre Jakob Smits
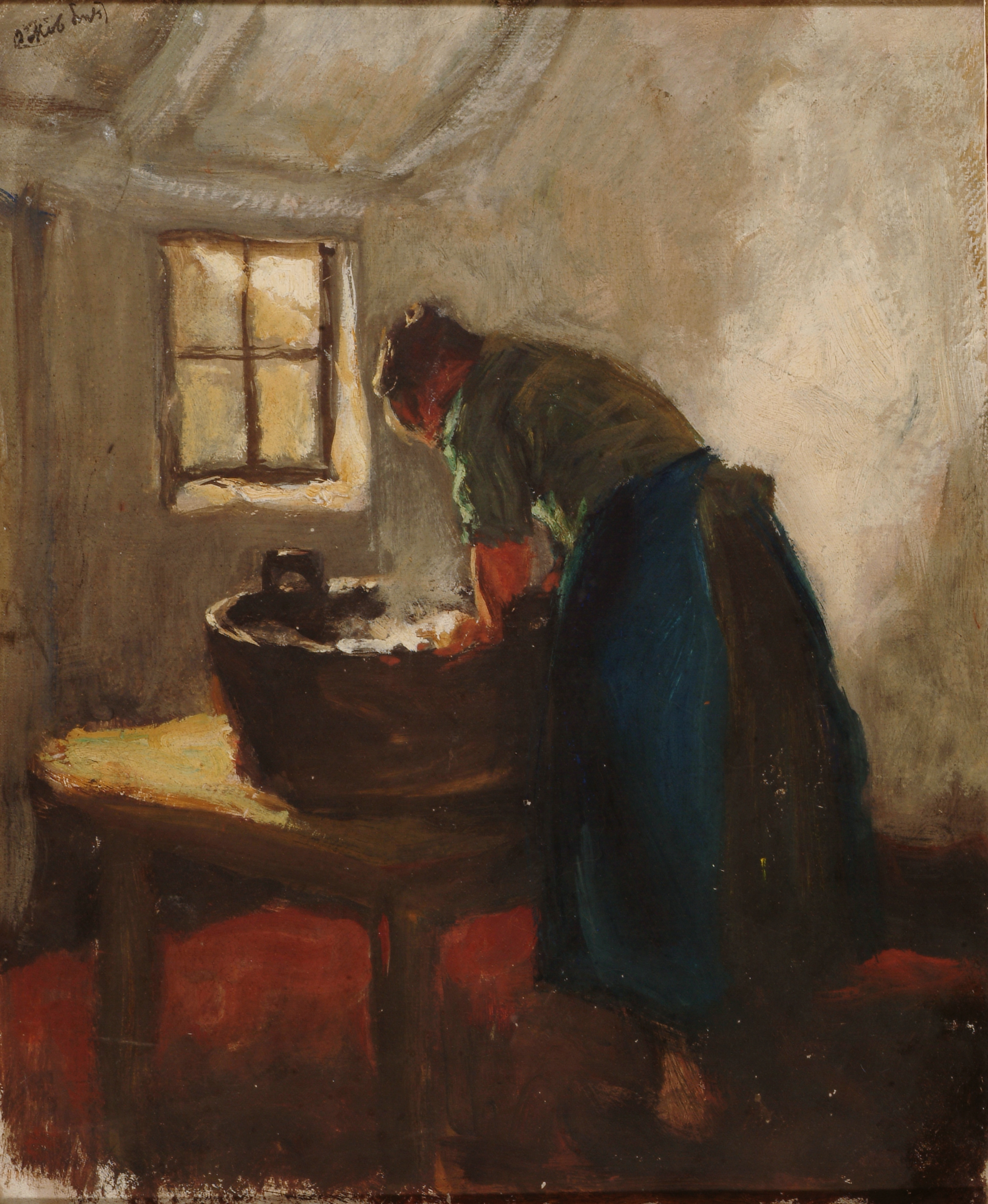
Vrouw aan de wastobbe, collection Jakob Smits Museum

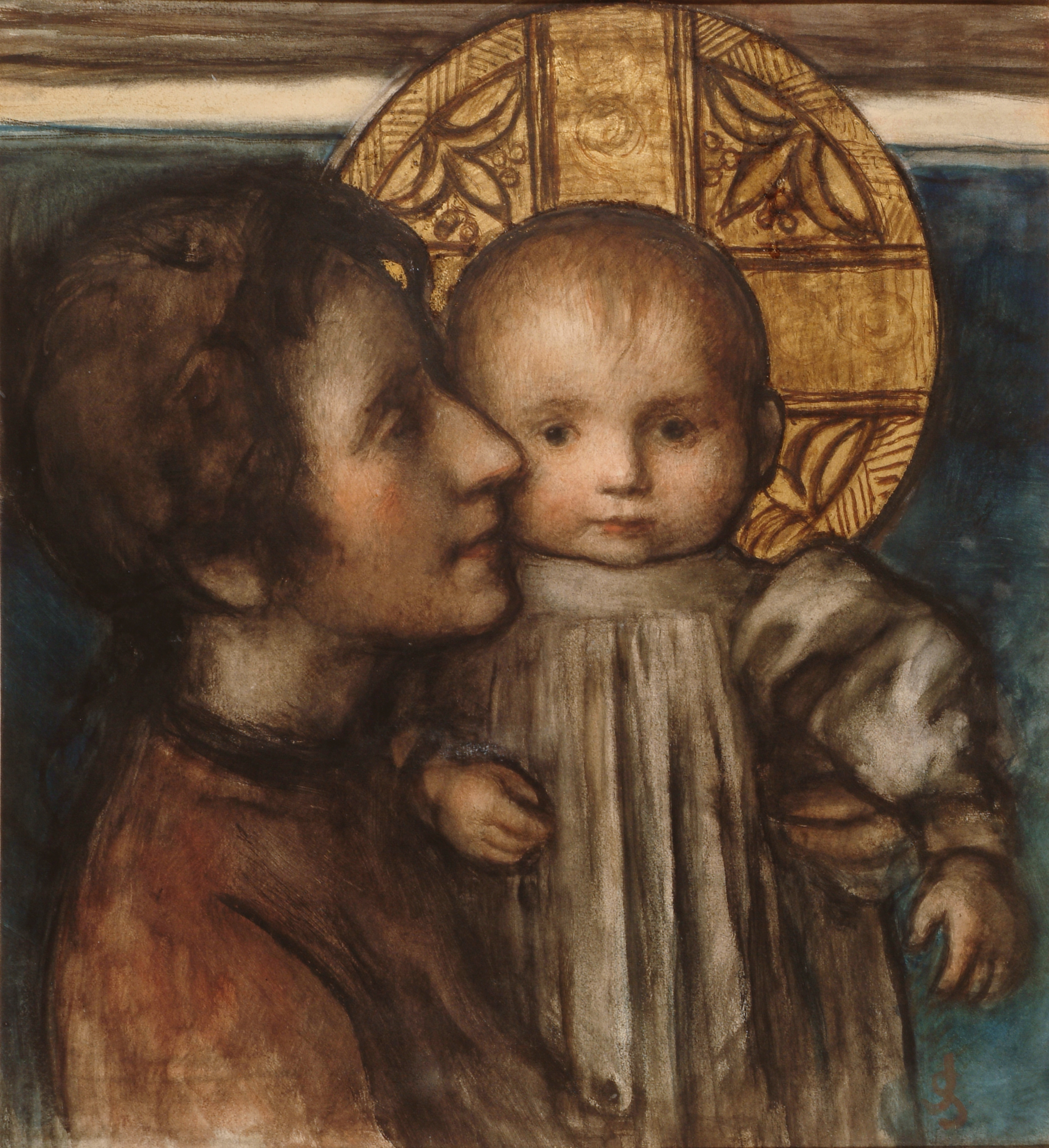
Mater Dei, collection Jakob Smits Museum

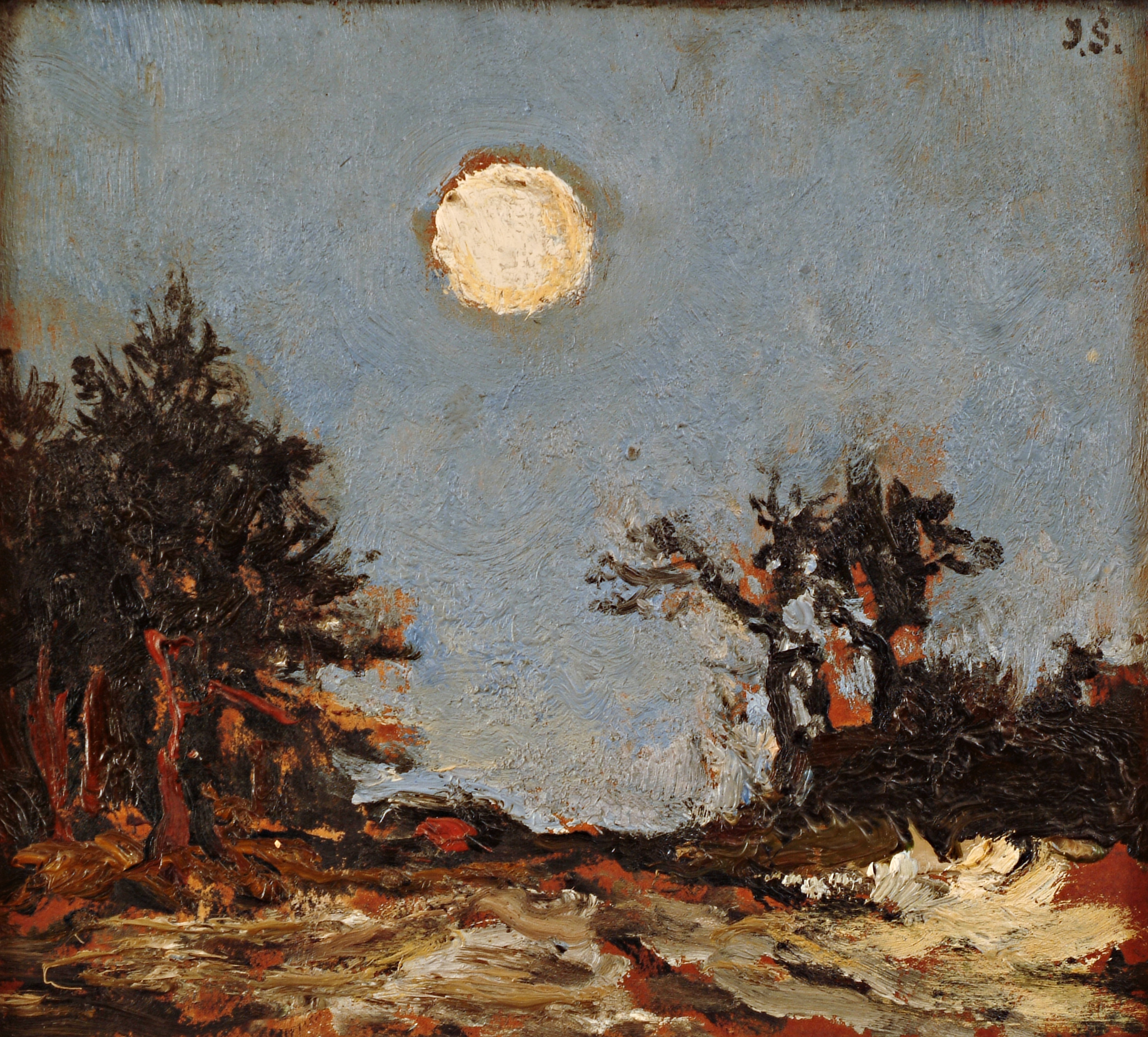
Herfstdreef, collection Jakob Smits Museum

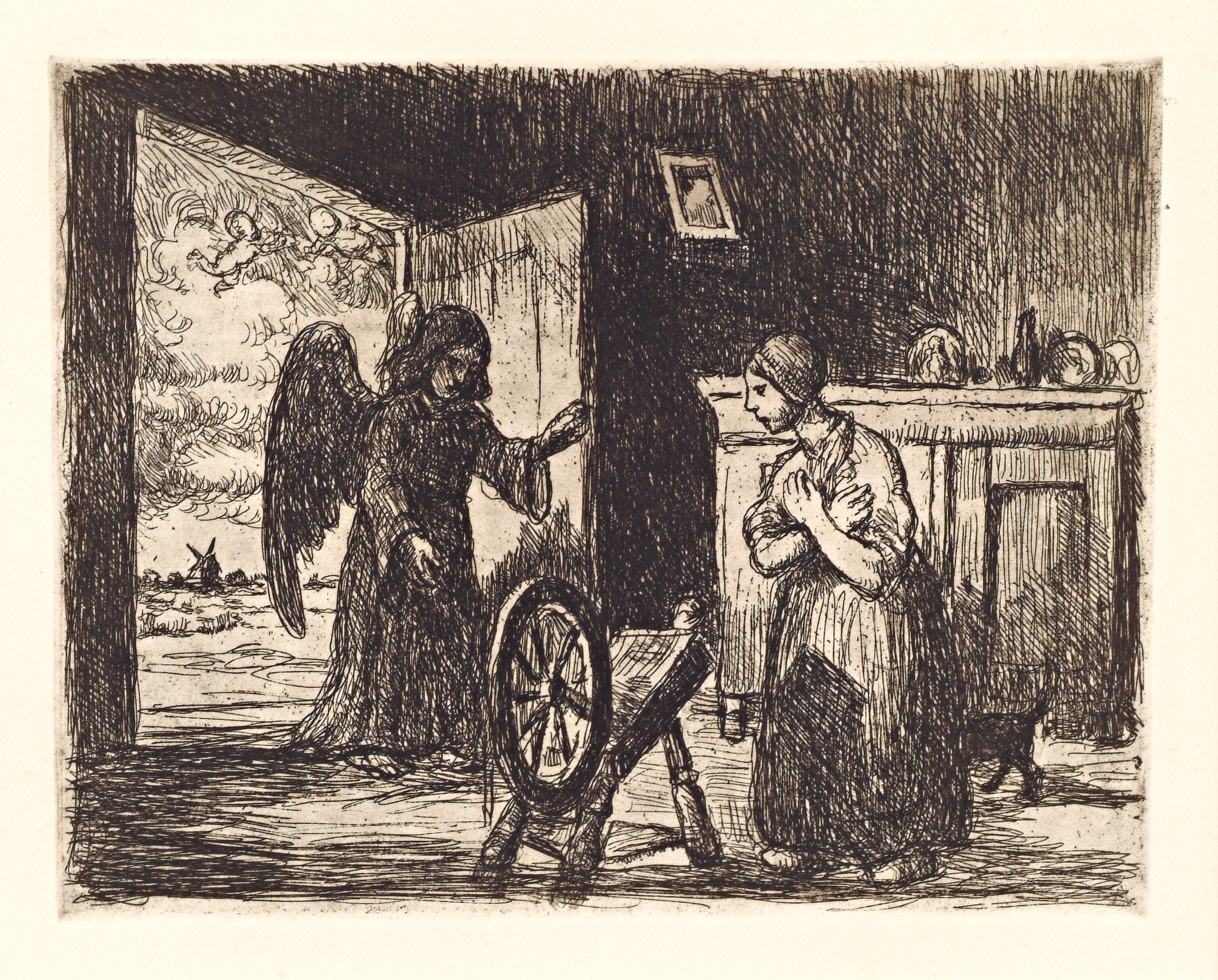
Maria Boodschap II, collection Jakob Smits Museum

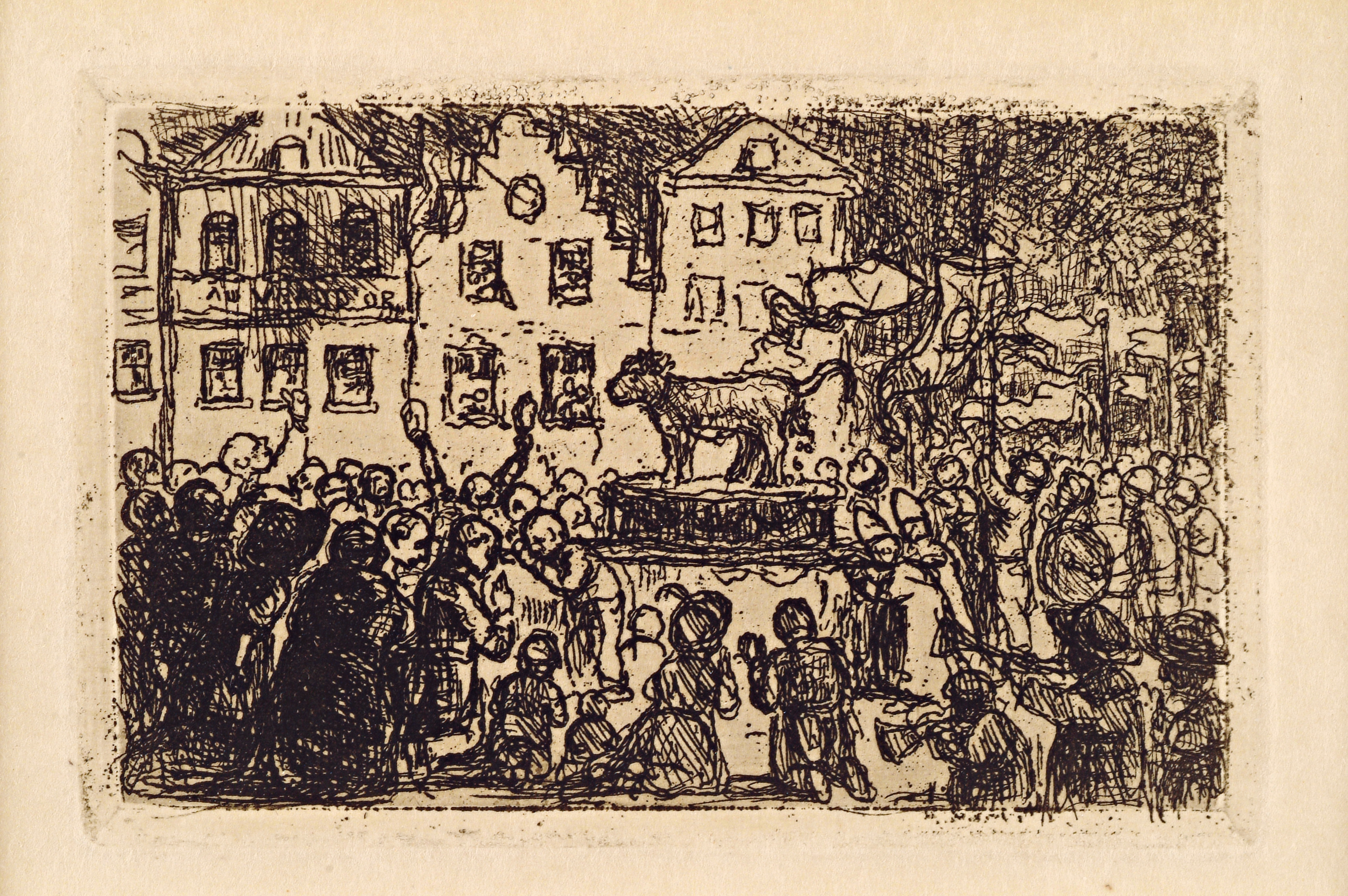
Het gouden kalf, collection Jakob Smits Museum

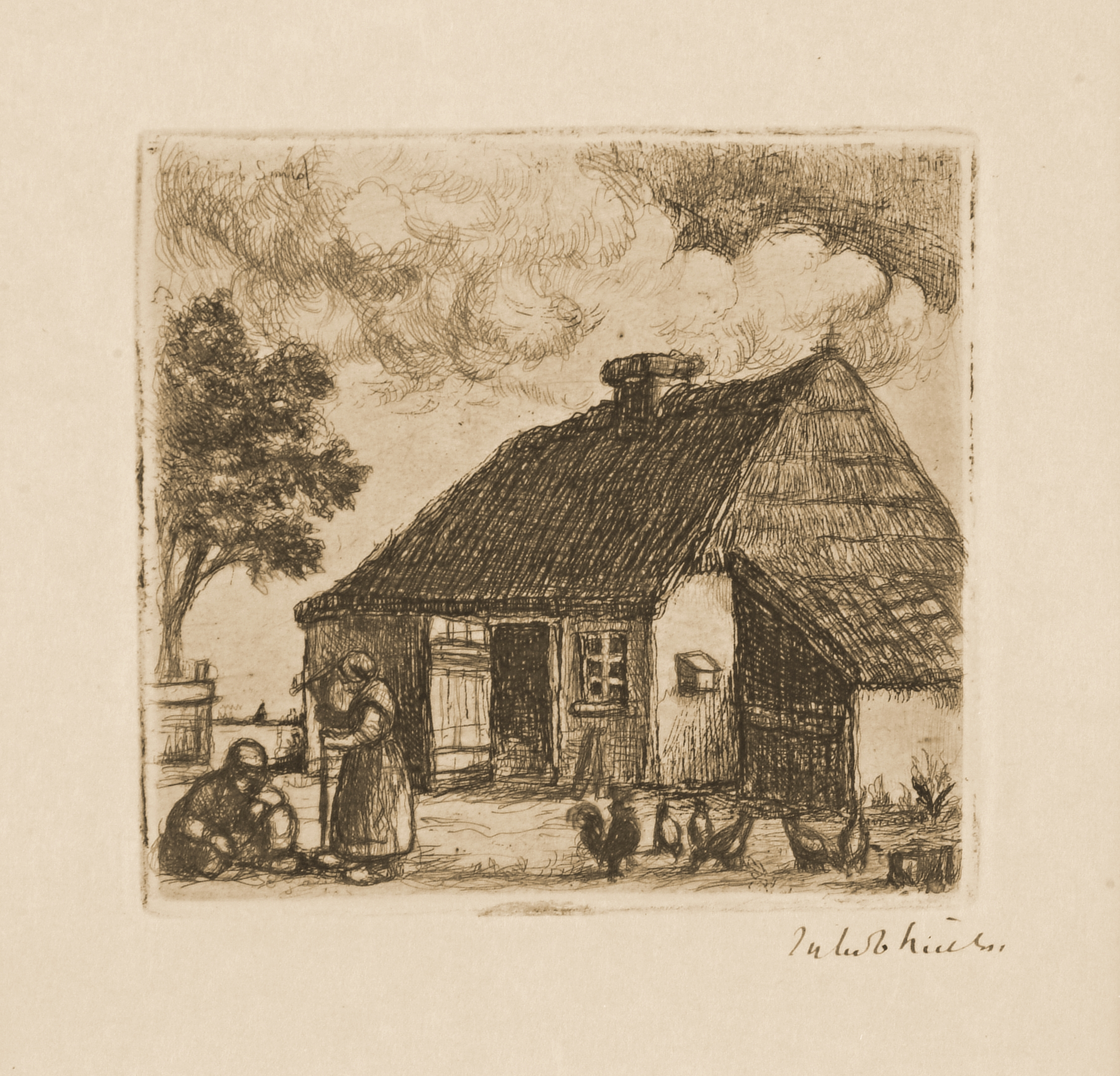
Gehucht in de Kempen, collection Jakob Smits Museum

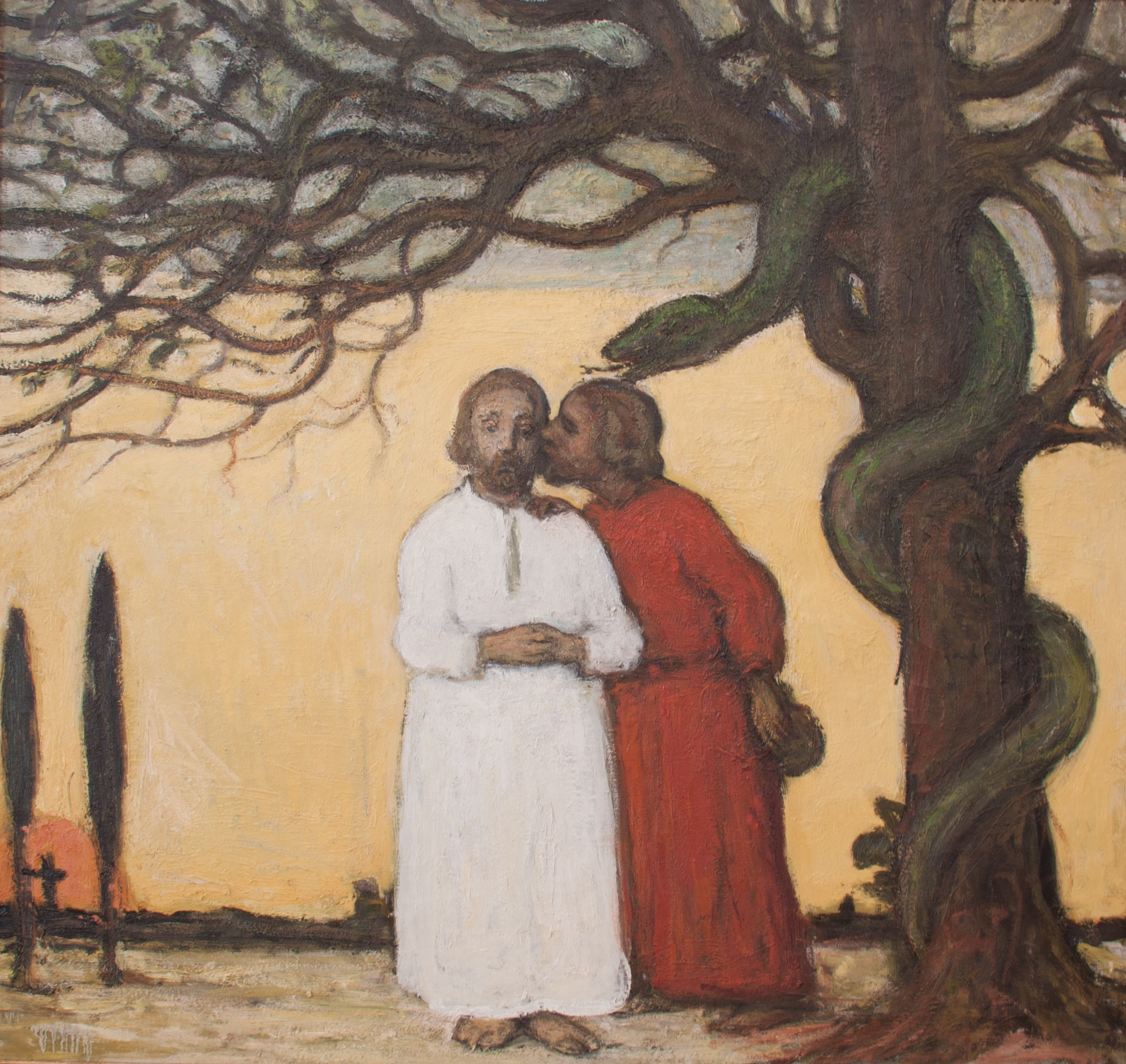
Judaskus, collection Jakob Smits Museum

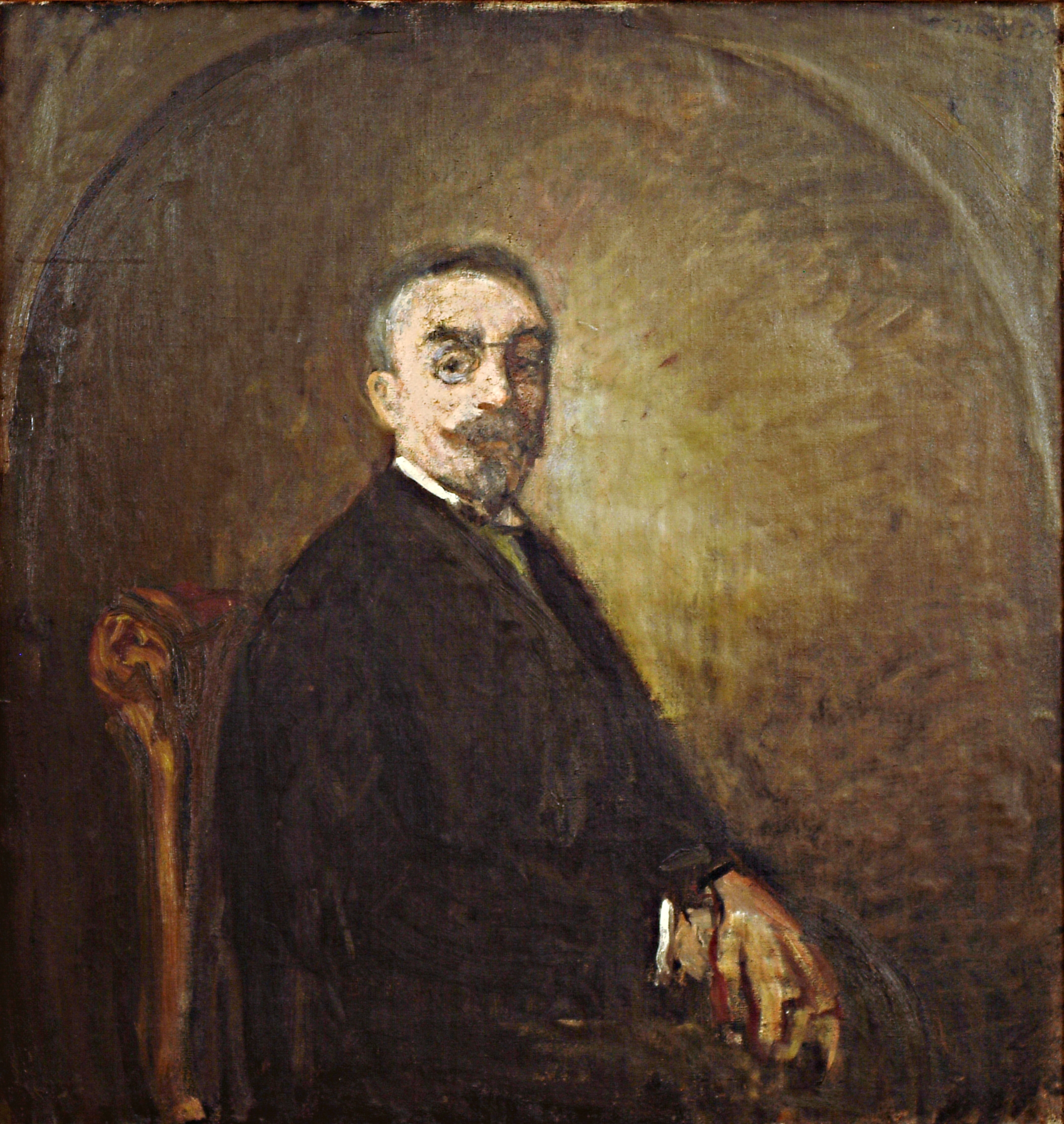
Senator Max Hallet, 1919, collection Jakob Smits Museum

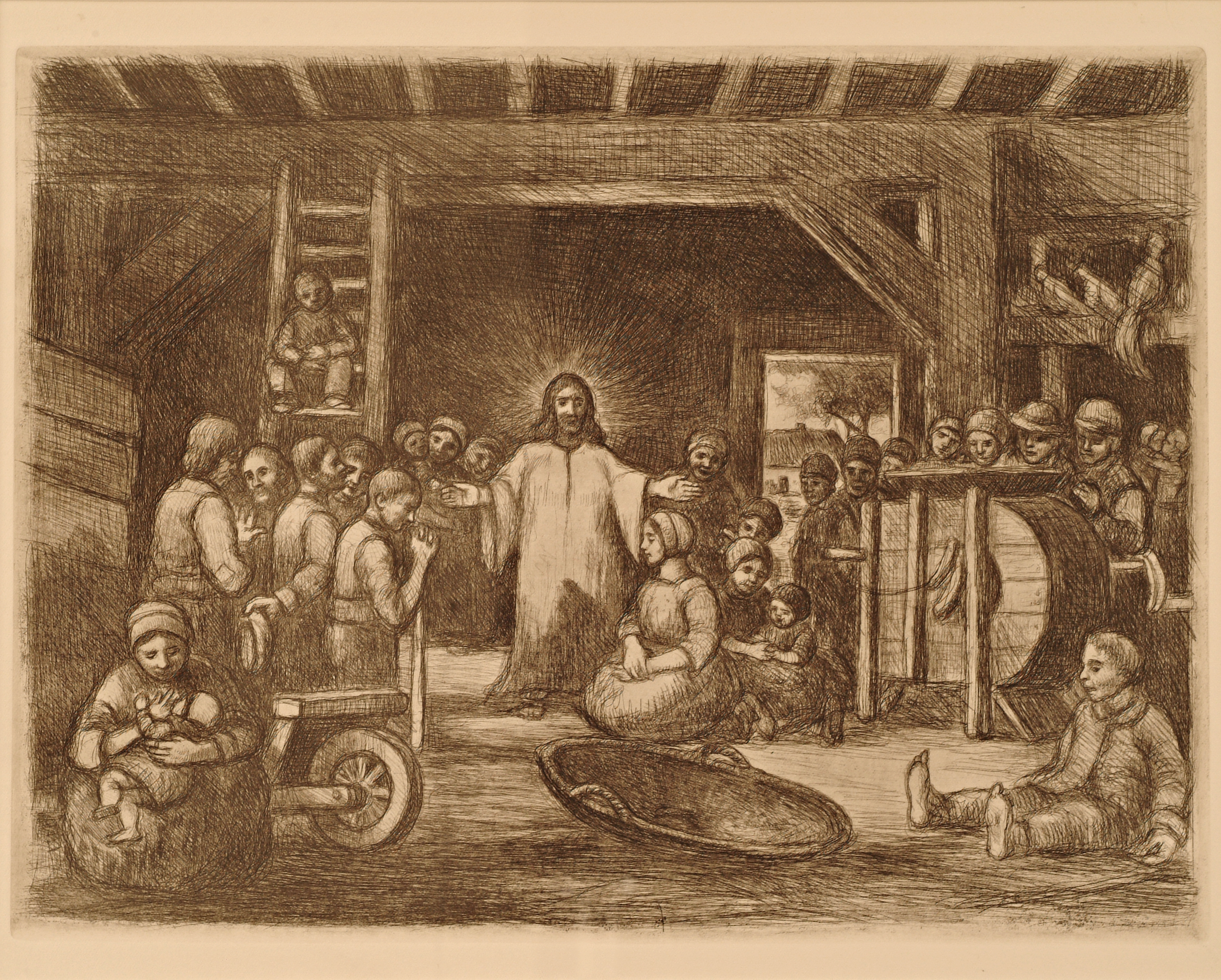
Christus predikend in de schuur, collection Jakob Smits Museum

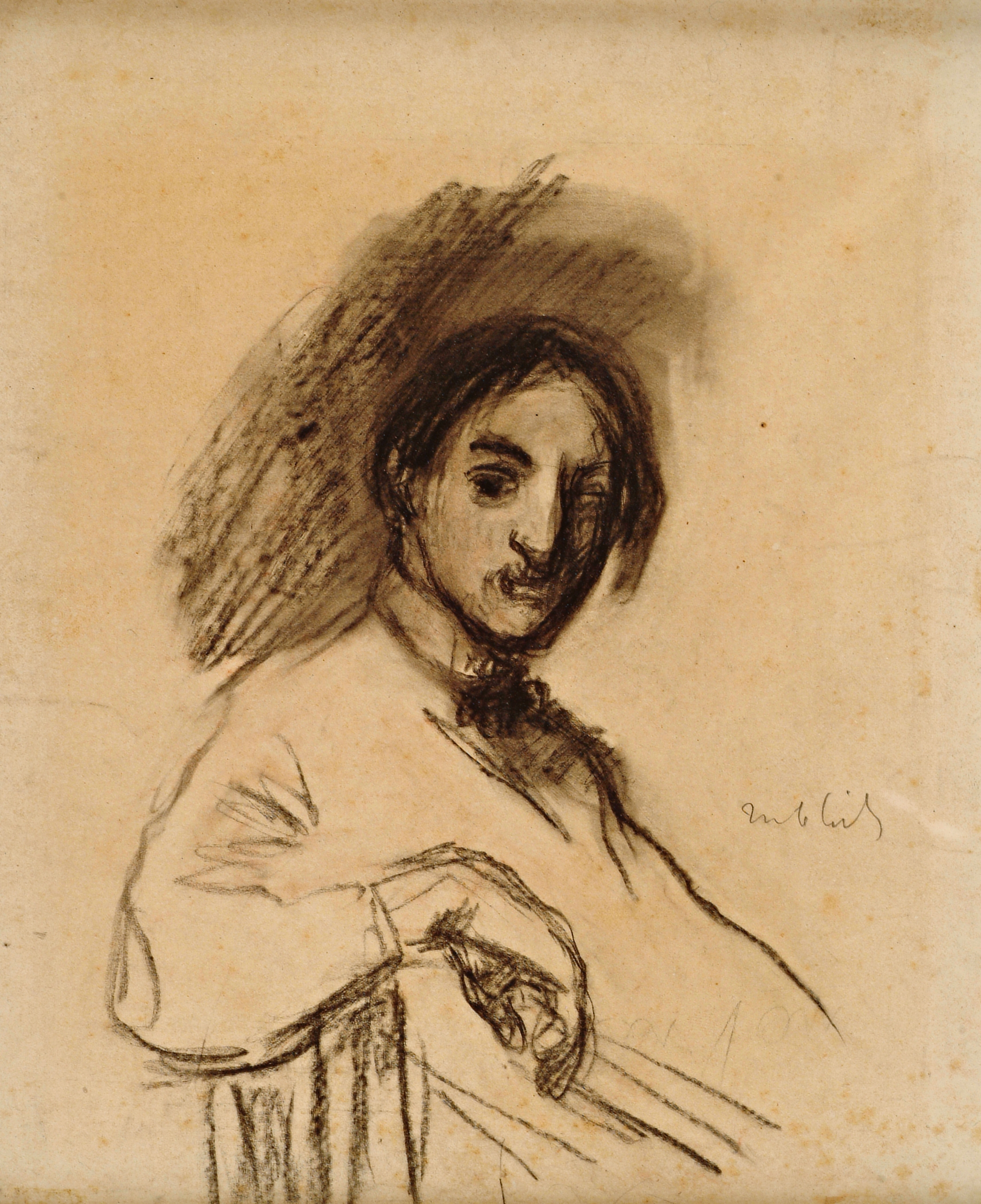
Jef Van Hoof, collection Jakob Smits Museum

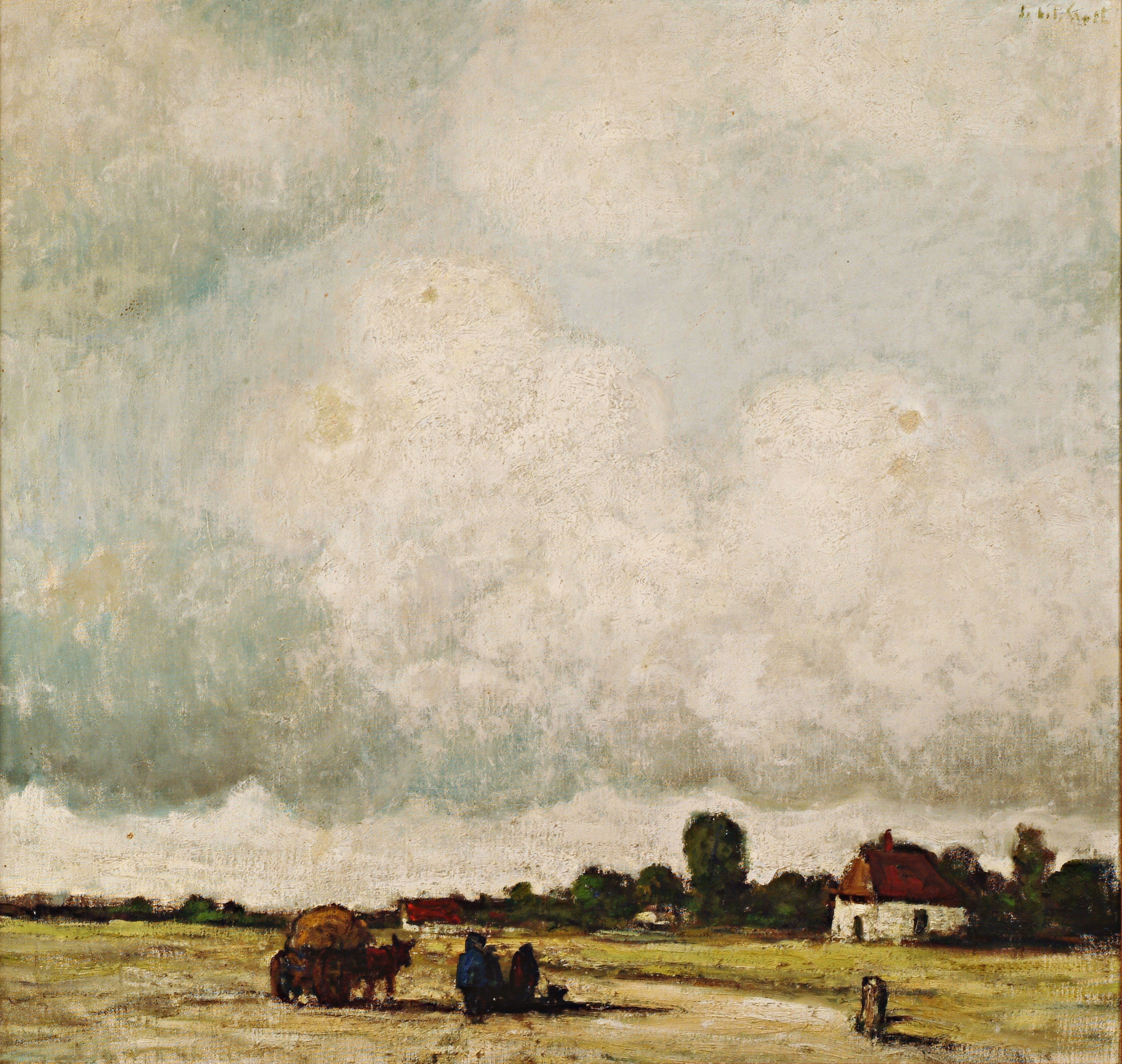
Kempisch landschap, 1927, collection Jakob Smits Museum

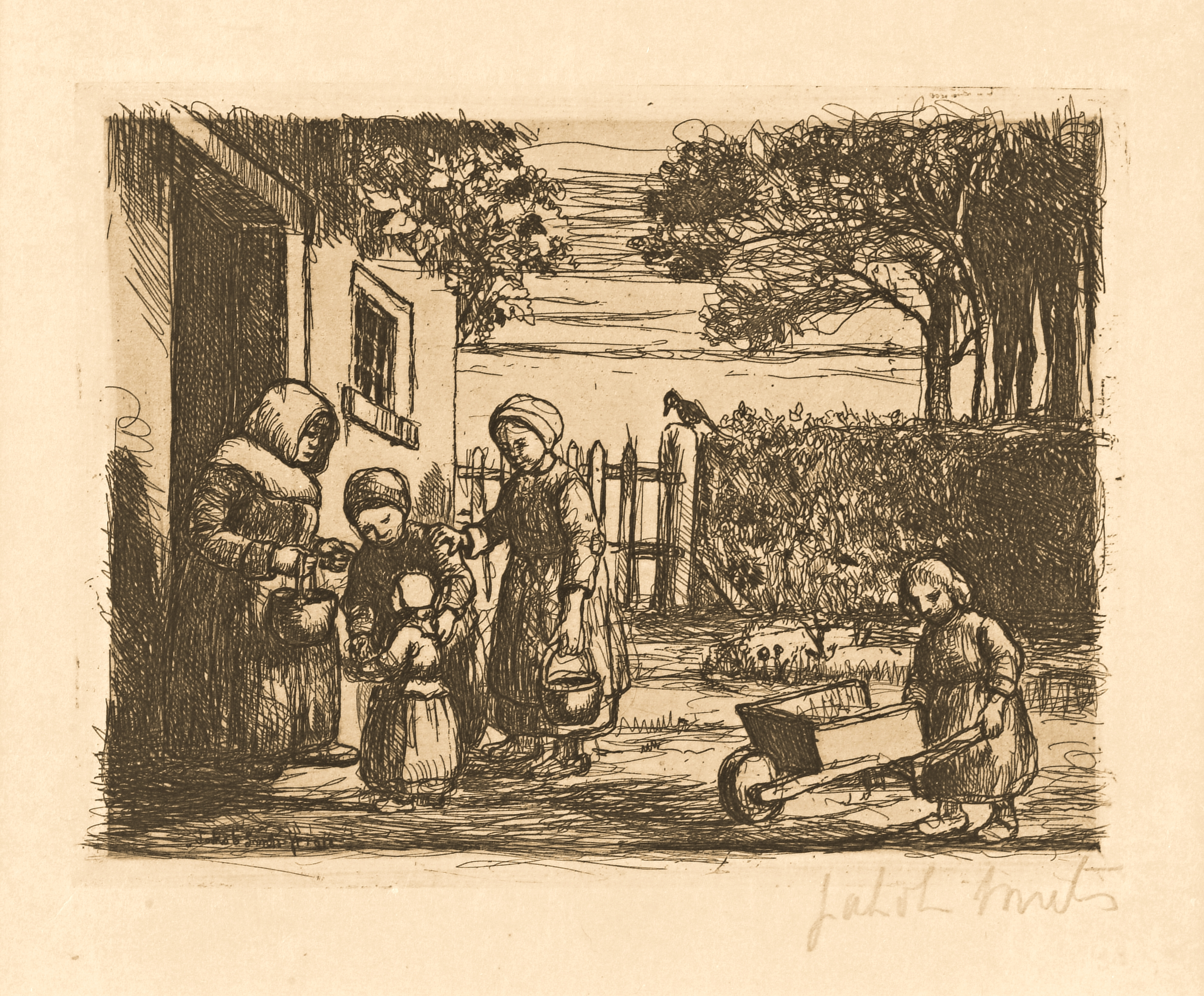
De armen, collection Jakob Smits Museum

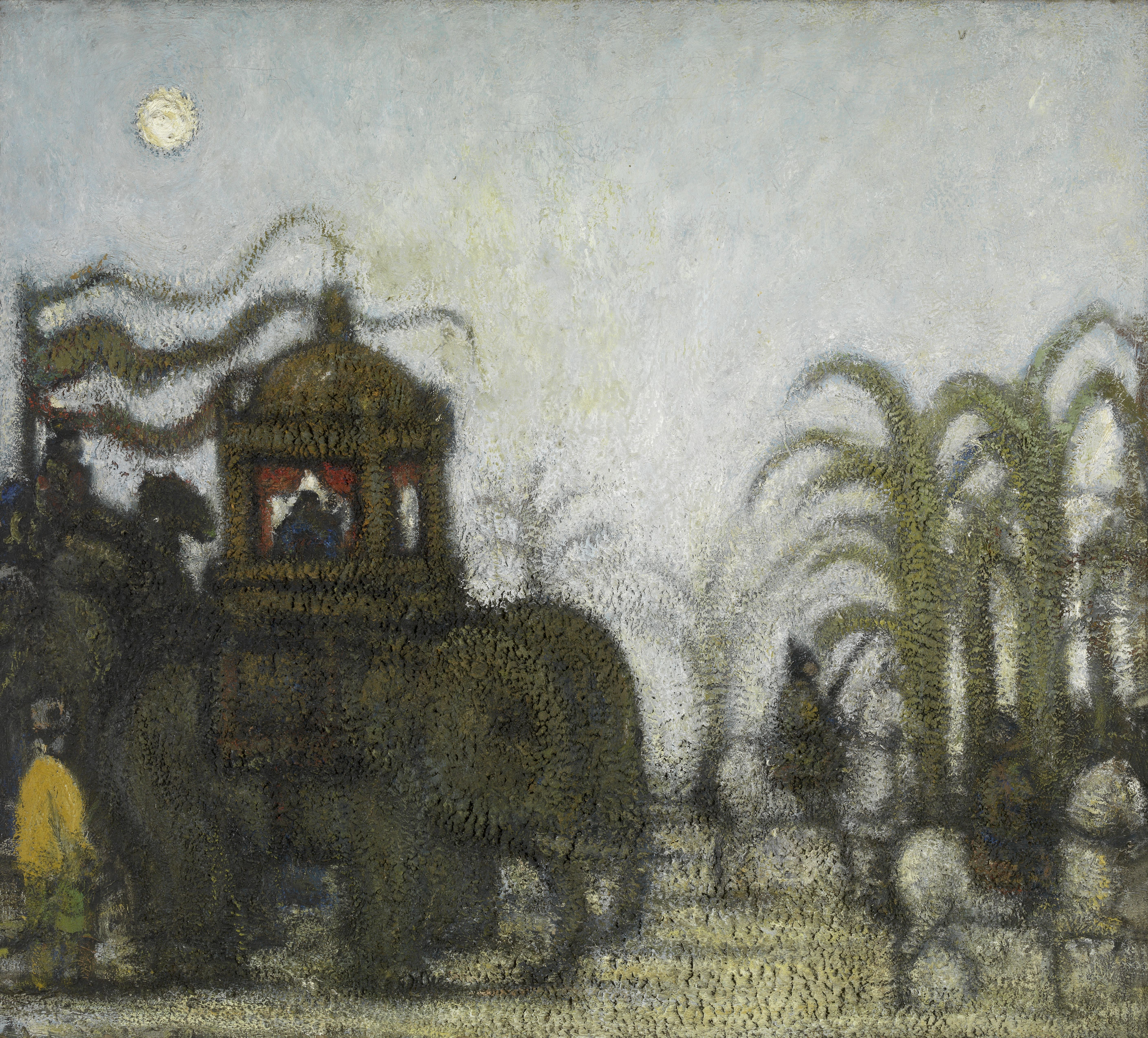
De stoet van de magiërs, 1925, collection Royal Museum of Fine Arts Antwerp

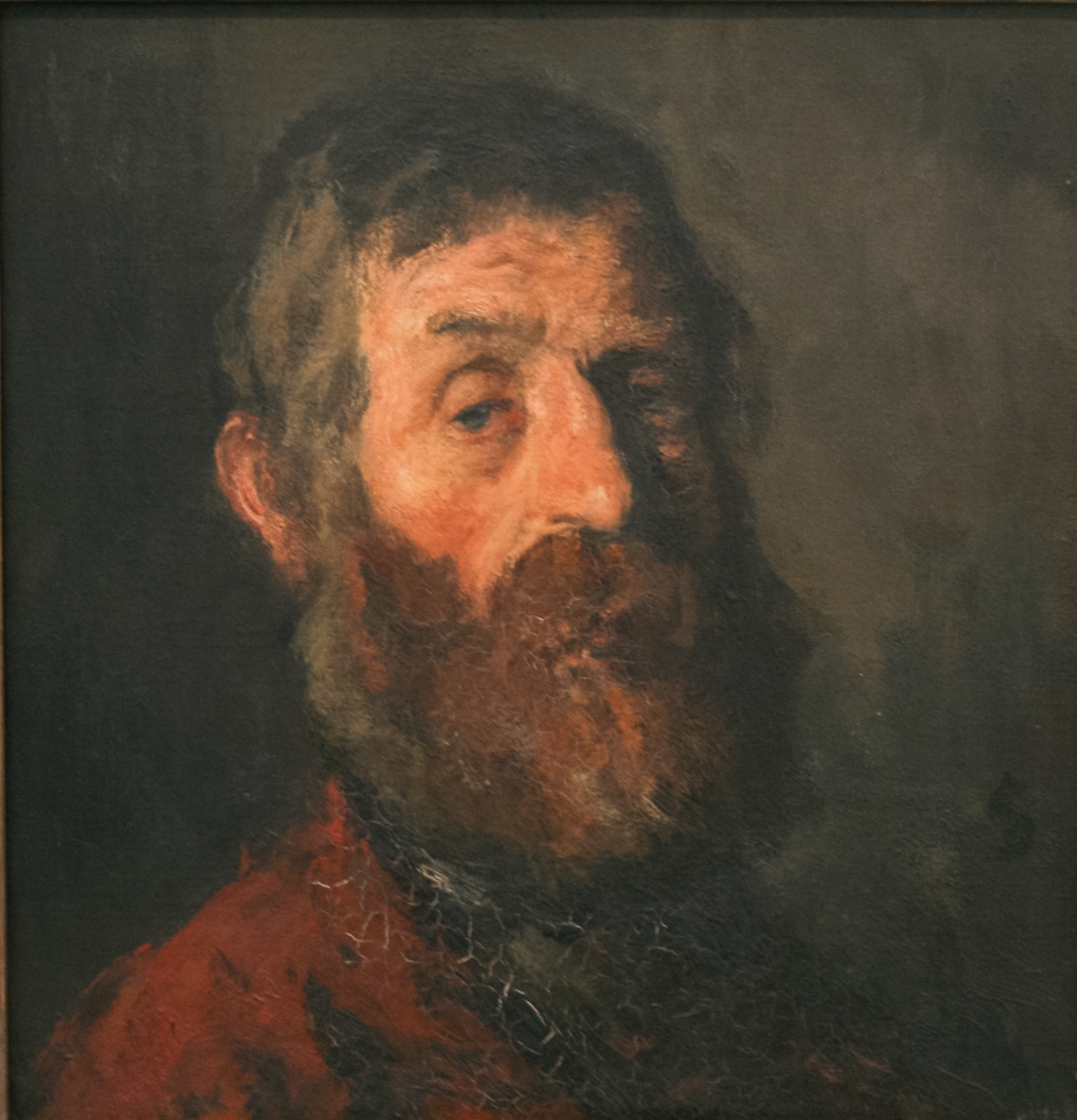
Portret van een boer, collection Museum of Fine Arts, Ghent

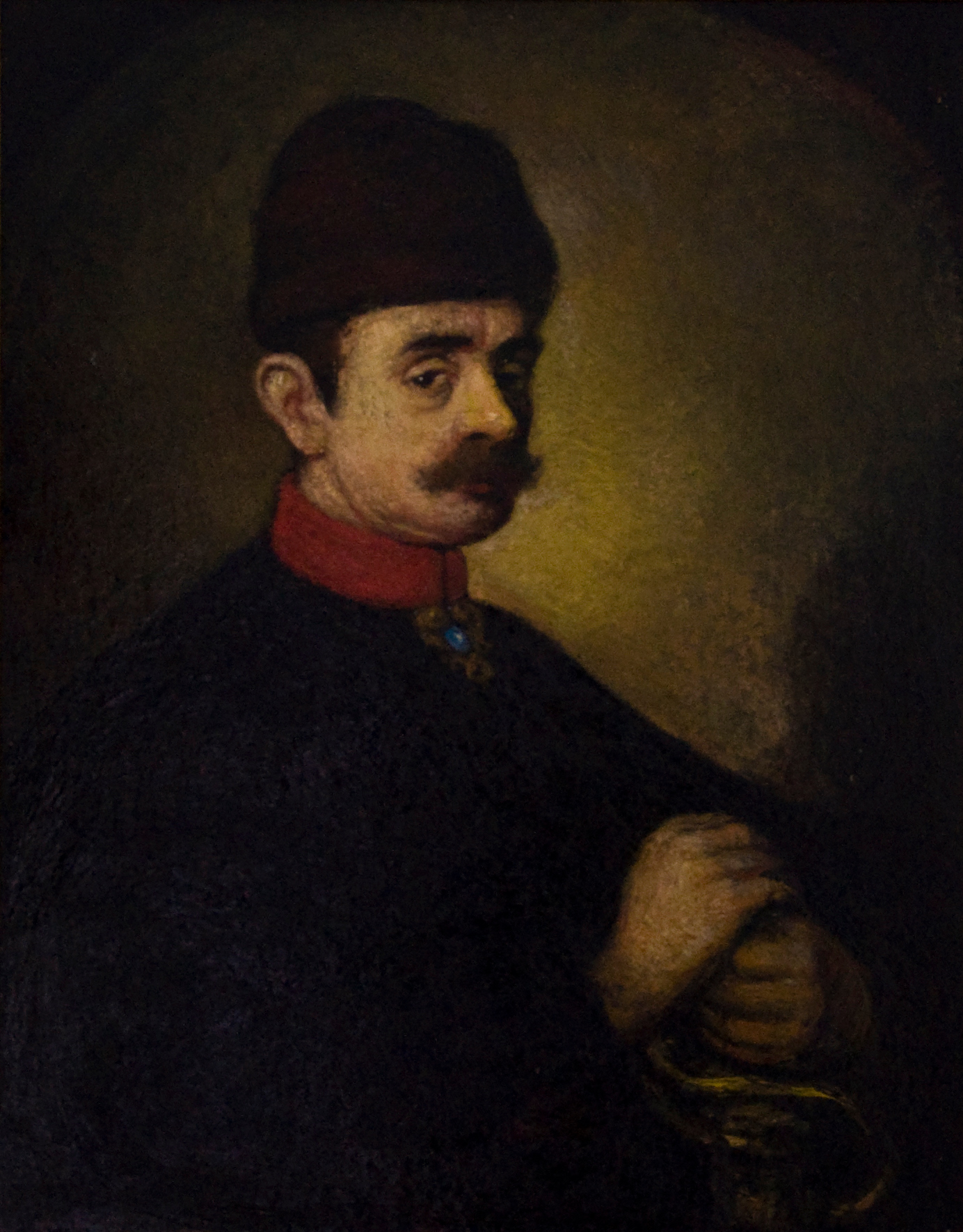
Man met de pelsen muts, 1905, collection Museum Dhondt-Dhaenens

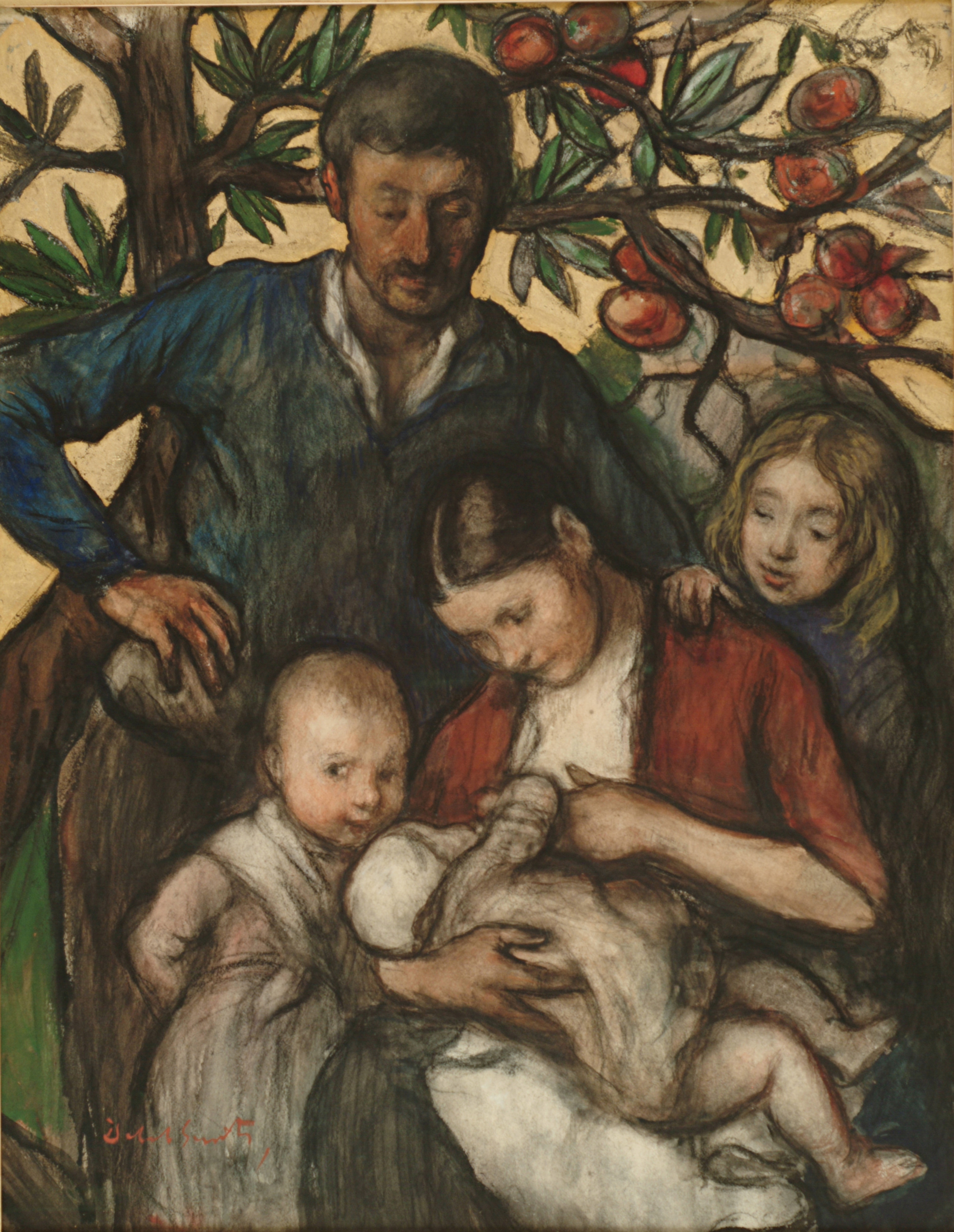
De zomer, 1894, collection Jakob Smits Museum

== Sources ==
- E. Van den Bosch, Jakob Smits, Antwerpen, 1930.
- G. Marlier, Jakob Smits, Bruxelles, 1931.
- Jozef Muls, Jacob Smits en de Kempen, Boekengilde, 1936, pp 32, 11 afb.
- P. Haesaerts, Jakob Smits, Antwerpen, 1948.
- Jakob Smits, (tentoonstellingscatalogus), Venlo, (Museum van Bommel-Van Dam), 1976.
- W. Vanbeselaere, Jakob Smits, Kasterlee, 1976.
- I. Verheyen, F. Van Gompel, F. De Nave en I. Malomgré, Jakob Smits. Etser en Lithograaf. Catalogue Raisonné van het grafisch werk, Antwerpen, 1997.
