= Dirk Baksteen =

Belgian painter

Dirk Baksteen (29 March 1886 in Rotterdam – 24 September 1971 in Antwerp,) was a Belgian painter and etcher.

Baksteen, the son of Dirk Baksteen and Jansje van Heiningen, grew up in a family of ten children and had to help support the family as a house painter. However, Baksteen, like his brother Gerard, became a painter at a young age.

Baksteen ended up in Antwerp in 1912 on the advice of his brother. In the Kempen, both brothers came into contact with the Rotterdam-born painter Jakob Smits. His brother moved back to Antwerp, but Baksteen stayed with Smits to learn from him as a painter. Baksteen did not follow an academic painting course like his brother. Smits and Baksteen spent many hours in Smits' studio, who soon understood that Baksteen had more aptitude for graphic arts. Due to his stay in Mol, Baksteen is attributed to the Molse School. Baksteen's work has been exhibited at the Jacob Smits Museum.

Baksteen's work is held in the permanent collection of the National Gallery of Art, the Art Institute of Chicago, the Cleveland Museum of Art, and the Caput Ovis Collection.

An archive folder of reviews of his work, exhibition catalogs and other papers and ephemera on the artist is held in the Smithsonian Institution Libraries Collection.

== Literature ==
- 1926, Jef Vervaecke, 'Dirk Baksteen en de Kempen', Ons Land in Woord en Beeld, 7e jg, nr. 44, 6/2, p698, (5 zw/w afb.)
- Nieuwenhuysen, Piet J. van Dirk Baksteen, De etser van de Kempen, 1886-1971 ISBN 90-72931-16-5
