= Vieweg =

Vieweg is a German surname. Notable people with the surname include:

- Alexander Vieweg (born 1986), German javelin thrower
- Eduard Vieweg (1797–1869), German publisher and bookseller
- Friedrich Vieweg (1761–1835), German publisher and bookseller
- Johannes Vieweg (born 1958), German-American medical professor
- Karl Friedrich Vieweg (fl. 1790), German entomologist
- Klaus Vieweg (born 1953), German philosopher
- Kurt Vieweg (1911–1976), German politician
- Olivia Vieweg (born 1987), German cartoonist and author

== See also ==
- Vieweg+Teubner Verlag, a German publishing company
