= George Westermann =

German publisher (1810–1879)

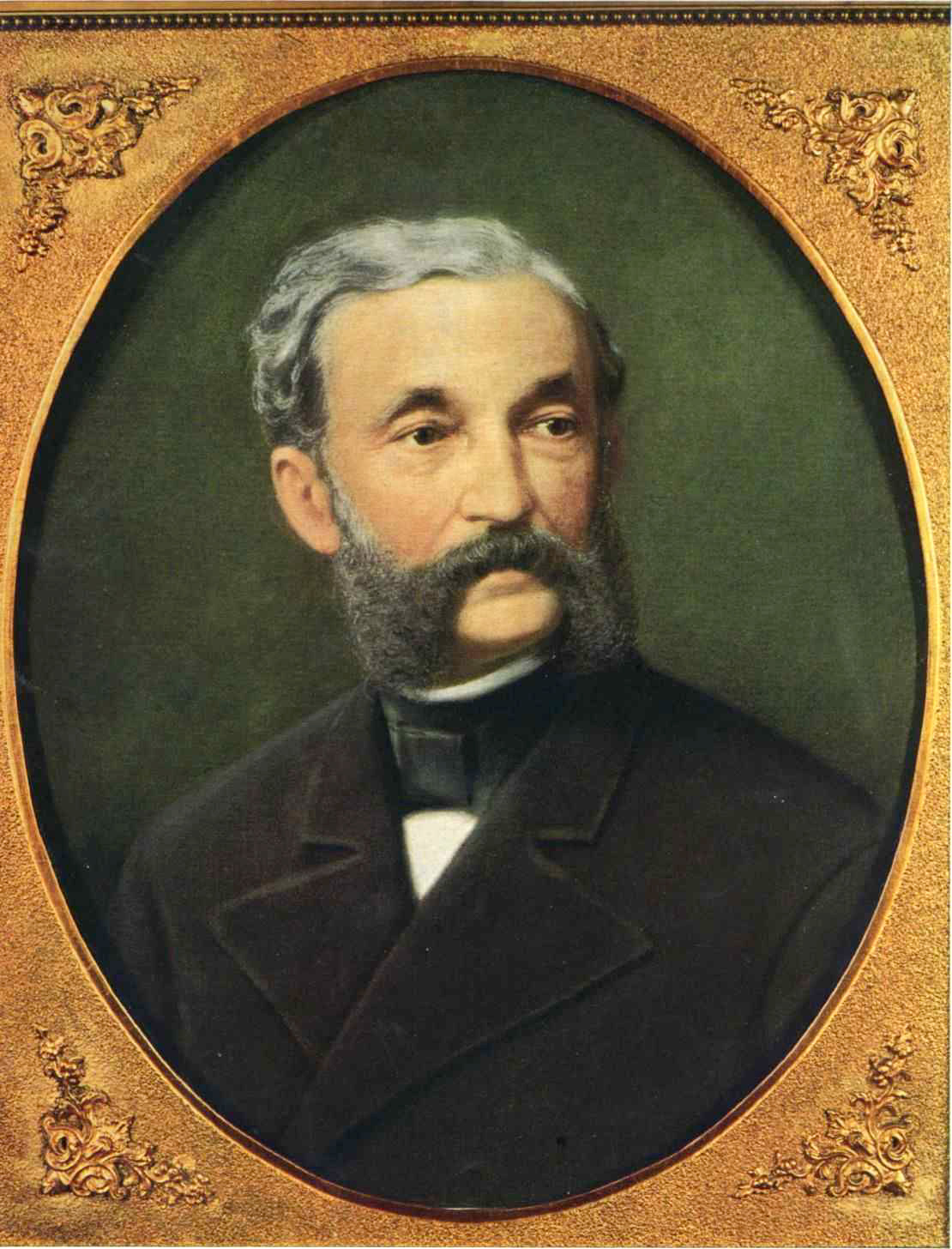
George Westermann

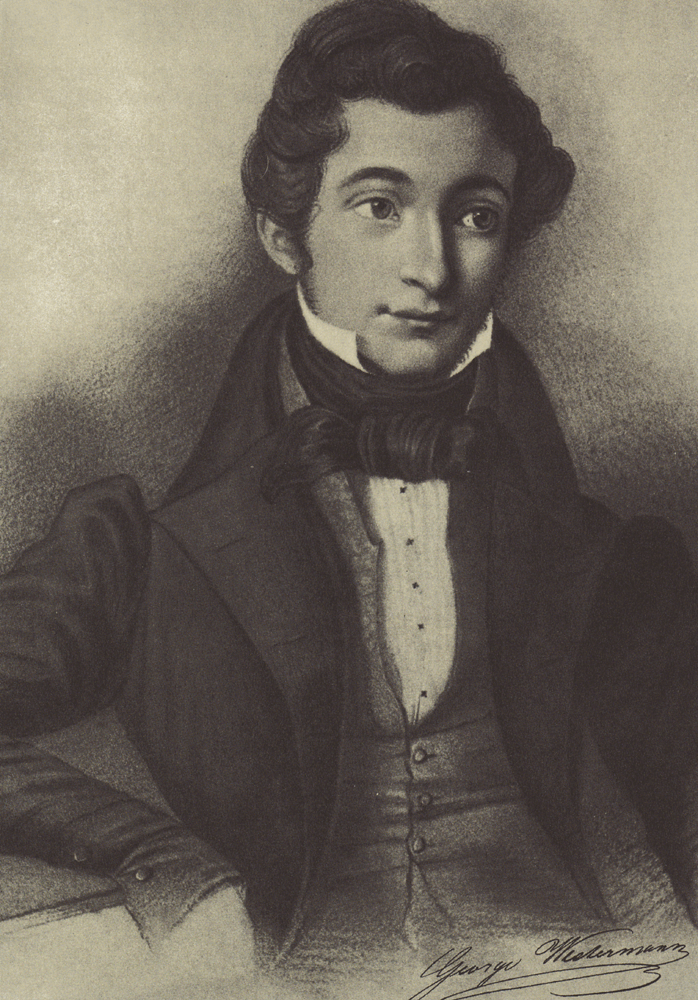
George Westermann, before 1838

George Westermann (born February 23, 1810 in Leipzig; died September 7, 1879 in Wiesbaden) was a German entrepreneur and publisher.

== Life ==
Westermann was son of Heinrich Christoph Carl Westermann (1777–1835). His older brother was the philogist Anton Westermann. He went to Humanistisches Gymnasium Albertina in Freiberg and since 1827 worked for the publisher Friedrich Vieweg in Braunschweig. In 1838, Westermann founded with help of the publisher Eduard Vieweg the German publishing company Westermann Verlag in Braunschweig. His son was German publisher Friedrich Westermann (1840–1907).
