= The Meaning of Relativity =

Book by Albert Einstein

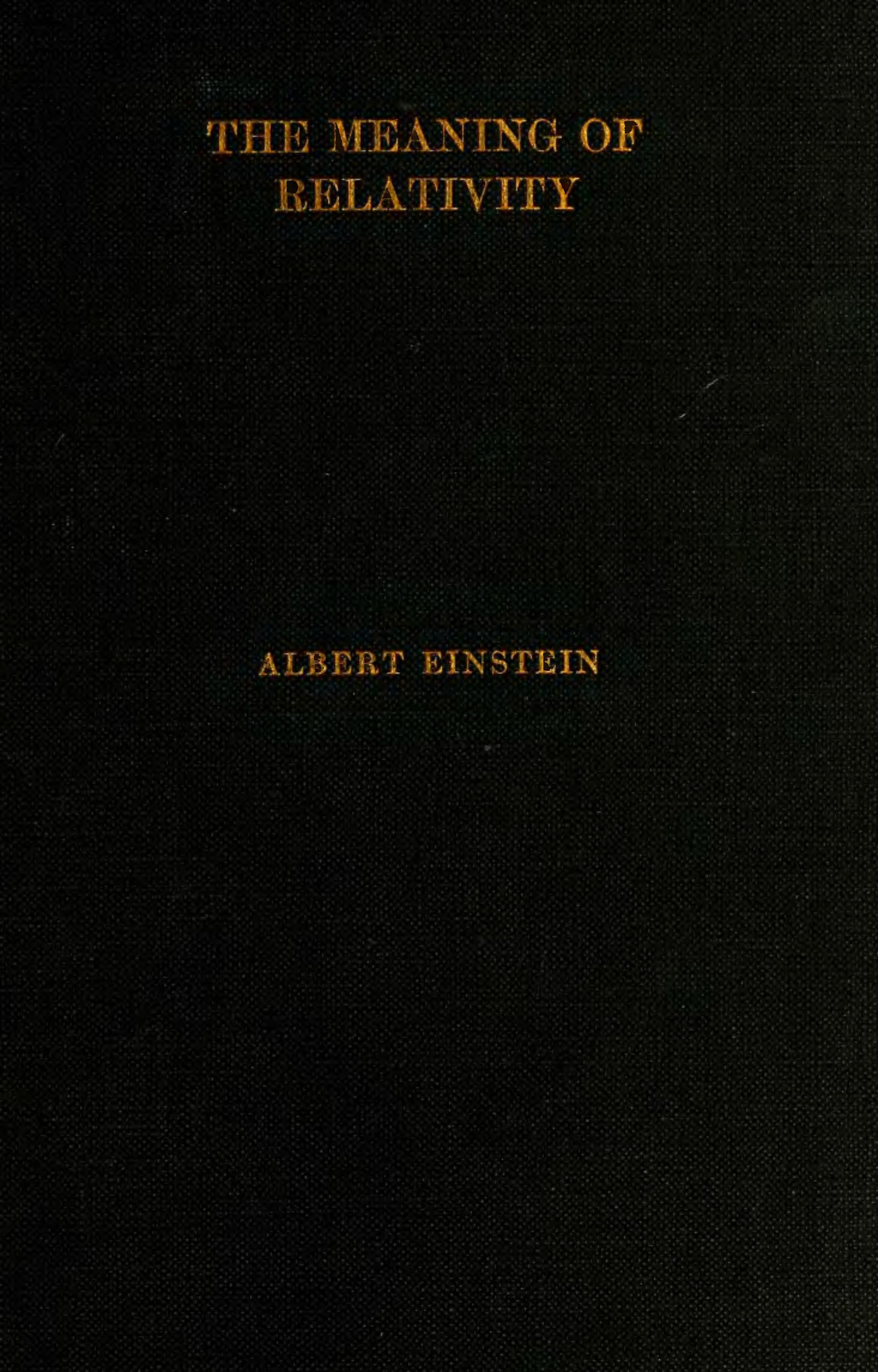
- Cover of the original 1922 edition
- Author: Albert Einstein
- Language: English
- Subject: Relativity theory
- Publisher: Princeton University Press
- Publication date: 1922 (original ed.)
- Publication place: United States
- Pages: 200
- ISBN: 978-0-6911-6408-3
- OCLC: 884013779
- Text: The Meaning of Relativity at Wikisource
- Identifiers refer to the 2014 reprint of the 5th edition unless otherwise noted

The Meaning of Relativity: Four Lectures Delivered at Princeton University, May 1921 is a book published by Princeton University Press in 1922 that compiled the 1921 Stafford Little Lectures at Princeton University, given by Albert Einstein. The lectures were translated into English by Edwin Plimpton Adams. The lectures and the subsequent book were Einstein's last attempt to provide a comprehensive overview of his theory of relativity and is his only book that provides an accessible overview of the physics and mathematics of general relativity. Einstein explained his goal in the preface of the book's German edition by stating he "wanted to summarize the principal thoughts and mathematical methods of relativity theory" and that his "principal aim was to let the fundamentals in the entire train of thought of the theory emerge clearly". Among other reviews, the lectures were the subject of the 2017 book The Formative Years of Relativity: The History and Meaning of Einstein's Princeton Lectures by Hanoch Gutfreund and Jürgen Renn.

== Background ==
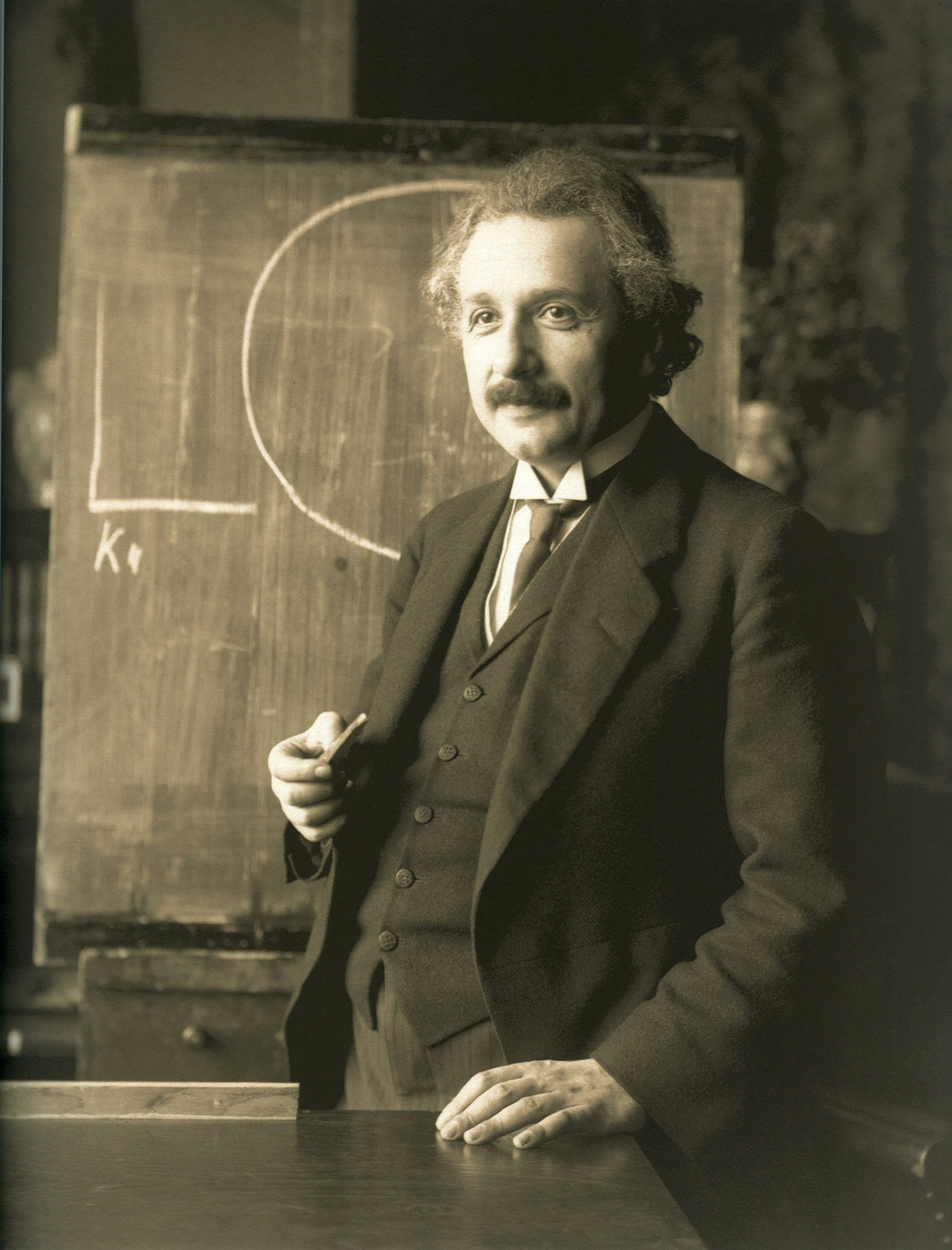
Einstein in 1921

The book contains four of Einstein's Stafford Little Lectures that were given at Princeton University in 1921. The lectures follow a series of 1915 publications by Einstein developing the theory of general relativity. During this time, there were still many controversial issues surrounding the theories and he was still defending several of his views. The lectures and the subsequent book were Einstein's last attempt to provide a comprehensive overview of his theory of relativity. It is also his only book that provides an overview of the physics and mathematics of general relativity in a comprehensive manner that was accessible to non-specialists. Einstein explained his goal in the preface of the book's German edition by stating he "wanted to summarize the principal thoughts and mathematical methods of relativity theory" and that his "principal aim was to let the fundamentals in the entire train of thought of the theory emerge clearly".

On 27 December 1949, The New York Times ran a story titled "New Einstein theory gives a master key to the universe" in reaction to the new appendix in the book's fifth edition in which Einstein expounded upon his latest unification efforts. Einstein had nothing to do with the article and subsequently refused to speak with any reporters on the matter; he reportedly used the message "[c]ome back and see me in twenty years" to brush off their inquiries.

== Content ==
The book is made of four lectures. The first is titled "Space and Time in Pre-Relativity Physics". The second lecture is titled The Theory of Special Relativity and discusses the special theory of relativity. The third and fourth lectures cover the general theory of relativity in two parts. Einstein added an appendix to update the book for its second edition, which published in 1945. A second appendix was later added for the fifth edition as well, in 1955, which discusses the nonsymmetric field. The second appendix contains Einstein's attempts at a unified field theory.

== Reception ==
The book has received many reviews since its initial publication. The first edition of the book was reviewed by Nature in 1923. Other early versions of the book were reviewed by George Yuri Rainich in 1946, as well as Abraham H. Taub, Philip Morrison, and I. M. Levitt in 1950. Reviews for the book's fifth edition include a short announcement in 1955 that called the book "a well-known classic". A 1956 review of the fifth edition summarizes its publication history and contents and closes by stating "Einstein's little book then serves as an excellent tying-together of loose ends and as a broad survey of the subject."

Among other references to the book, a 2005 column of The Physics Teacher, included the work in a list of books "by and about Einstein that all physics teachers should have" and "should have immediate access to", while a 2019 review of another work opened by stating: "Every teacher of General Relativity depends heavily on two texts: one, the massive Gravitation by Misner, Thorne and Wheeler, the second the diminutive The Meaning of Relativity by Einstein." The Meaning of Relativity is the focus of a 2017 book, The Formative Years of Relativity by Hanoch Gutfreund and Jürgen Renn, which described The Meaning of Relativity as "Einstein's definitive exposition of his special and general theories of relativity".

== Publication history ==
=== Original English editions ===
- Einstein, Albert; Adams, Edwin Plimpton (1922). The Meaning of Relativity: Four Lectures Delivered at Princeton Univ., May, 1921 (1st ed.). London: Methuen Publishing. OCLC 637254801.
- Einstein, Albert (1945). The Meaning of Relativity (2nd ed.). Princeton, N.J.: Princeton University Press. OCLC 1105547540.
- Einstein, Albert (1950). The Meaning of Relativity (3rd ed.). Princeton: Princeton University Press. OCLC 1304366.
- Einstein, Albert (1953). The Meaning of Relativity: Including the Generalization of Gravitation Theory (4th ed.). Princeton, N.J.: Princeton University Press. OCLC 946162394.
- Einstein, Albert (1955). The meaning of relativity: including the relativistic theory of the non-symmetric field. Princeton: Princeton University Press. ISBN 9780691080079. OCLC 177301011.

=== Notable reprints ===
- Einstein, Albert (1967). The meaning of relativity. Foreword by William Hunter McCrea. Dordrecht: Springer Science+Business Media. ISBN 978-94-011-6022-3. OCLC 858949974.
- Einstein, Albert (2014). The Meaning of Relativity: Including the Relativistic Theory of the Non-symmetric Field. Introduction by Brian Greene (5th paperback ed.). Princeton: Princeton University Press. ISBN 978-0-6911-6408-3. OCLC 884013779.
- Einstein, Albert (2014). The Meaning of Relativity: Including the Relativistic Theory of the Non-symmetric Field. Introduction by Brian Greene (5th eBook ed.). Princeton: Princeton University Press. ISBN 978-1-4008-5187-4. OCLC 884013779.

=== German editions ===
- Einstein, Albert (1922). Vier Vorlesungen über Relativitätstheorie: gehalten im Mai 1921 an der Universität Princeton (in German). Braunschweig: Friedrich Vieweg. OCLC 2602048.
- Einstein, Albert (1923). Vier Vorlesungen über Relativitätstheorie: gehalten im Mai 1912 an der Universität Princeton (in German). Braunschweig: Friedrich Vieweg. OCLC 703134729.
- Einstein, Albert; Bargmann, Valentine (1956). Grundzüge der Relativitätstheorie (in German) (3rd ed.). Friedrich Vieweg. OCLC 73339958.
- Einstein, Albert (1965). Grundzüge der Relativitätstheorie (in German) (4th ed.). Braunschweig: Friedrich Vieweg. OCLC 257683026.
- Einstein, Albert; Treder, Hans-Jürgen; Bargmann, Valentine (1969). Grundzüge der Relativitätstheorie (in German). Friedrich Vieweg. ISBN 978-3-528-06058-9. OCLC 263642156.
- Einstein, Albert (2009). Grundzüge der Relativitätstheorie (in German). Springer Science+Business Media. ISBN 978-3-540-87846-9. OCLC 298553863.

== See also ==
- List of scientific publications by Albert Einstein
- Annus Mirabilis papers
- History of general relativity
- History of special relativity
