= Wendhausen Castle =

- Schloss Wendhausen
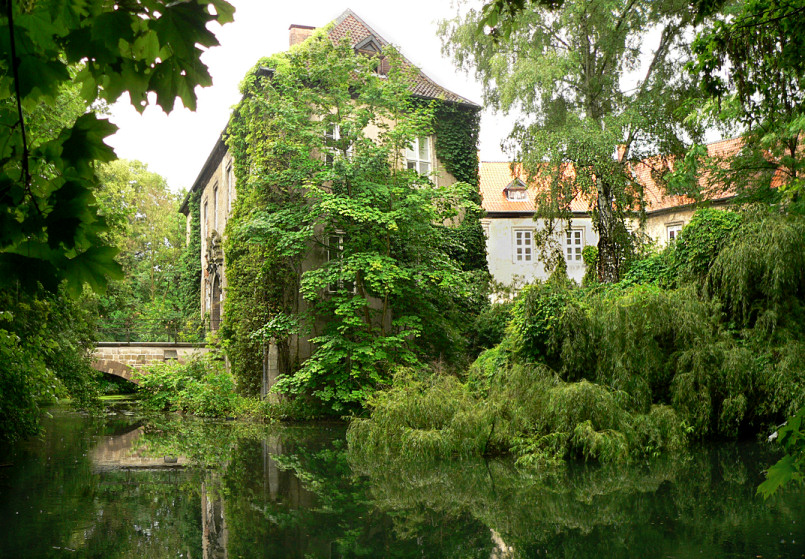
- Wendhausen Castle looking east

- Location within Lower Saxony Location within Germany

General information
- Status: Still standing
- Architectural style: Renaissance
- Location: Wendhausen, Germany, Hauptstraße 19
- Coordinates: 52°19′10″N 10°37′59″E
- Completed: 1688
- Owner: Kristin Adams

The Wendhausen Castle is a 17th-century moated castle located in Wendhausen, a community within the municipality of Lehre, Lower Saxony.

== Description ==
The castle is built in a Renaissance style surround by a large moat. The moat has an oblong shape with the castle being at the far eastern end. The western area within the moat was part of a beautiful and ornate gardens.

== History ==
The first mention of a moated castle at this location was in 1325 and was in the possession of the Duke of Braunschweig. Throughout its early history, it has numerous owners and was repeatedly burned. In 1602, the castle was completely destroyed. In 1682, the property was given to Philipp Ludwig Probst as compensation for services by Braunschweig-Wolfenbüttel Duke Rudolf August and his younger brother Duke Anton Ulrich. A water tower was constructed the same year. Probst, the Chancellor of the Principality of Brunswick-Wolfenbüttel, began building the Renaissance-style castle on the foundations of the moated castle dating to the 14th century. The complex included a cavalier house, barn, gatehouse and stables. The castle was completed in 1688. After Probst, Konrad Detlev von Dehn owned the castle and remodeled it using Versailles as a model. With his vision, he designed parks complete with gondolas.

A number of owners followed Dehn until the prominent Vieweg family leased the estate in 1836 and finally purchased the castle in 1873. The Vieweg's were well-known publishers from nearby Braunschweig and also built the Wendhausen Windmill. The Vieweg's created a large art collection. The last Vieweg heir died in February 1939 and the art was auctioned off in the following spring. The city of Braunschweig purchased the estate in 1941.

Following World War II, it was used as an auxiliary hospital, as a recovery facility and also as a kindergarten. Between 1985 and 1992, it remained empty and in 1992, a three-year complete restoration began and was finished in 1995.

== Today ==
Today the castle is owned by the architect Carsten Henze who restored the property between 1992 and 1995, who in between 1995 and 2002 dedicated the southern wing, including the castle's representative ballroom to housing his private gallery. Today, a number of sculptures by the German artist Denis Stuart Rose are displayed in the castle's park.
