= Carl Diercke =

German cartographer

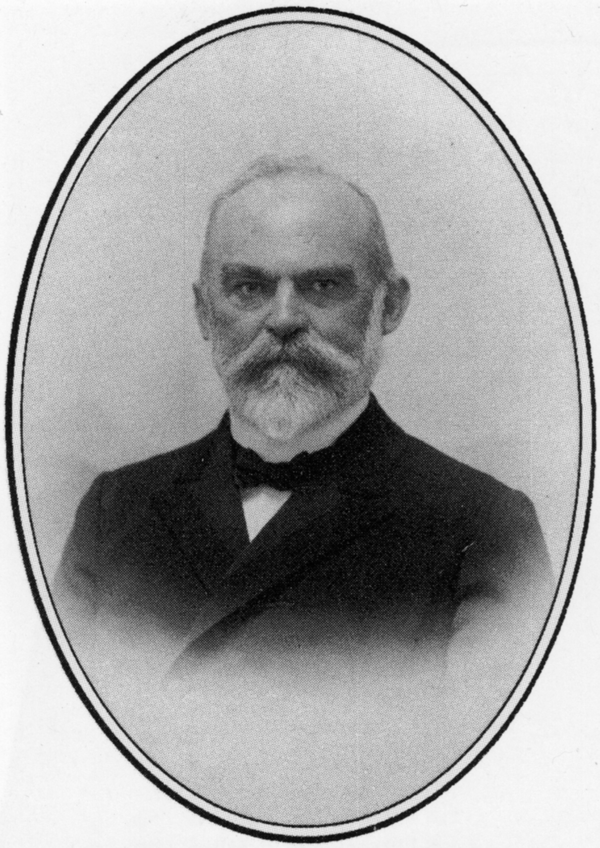
Carl Diercke

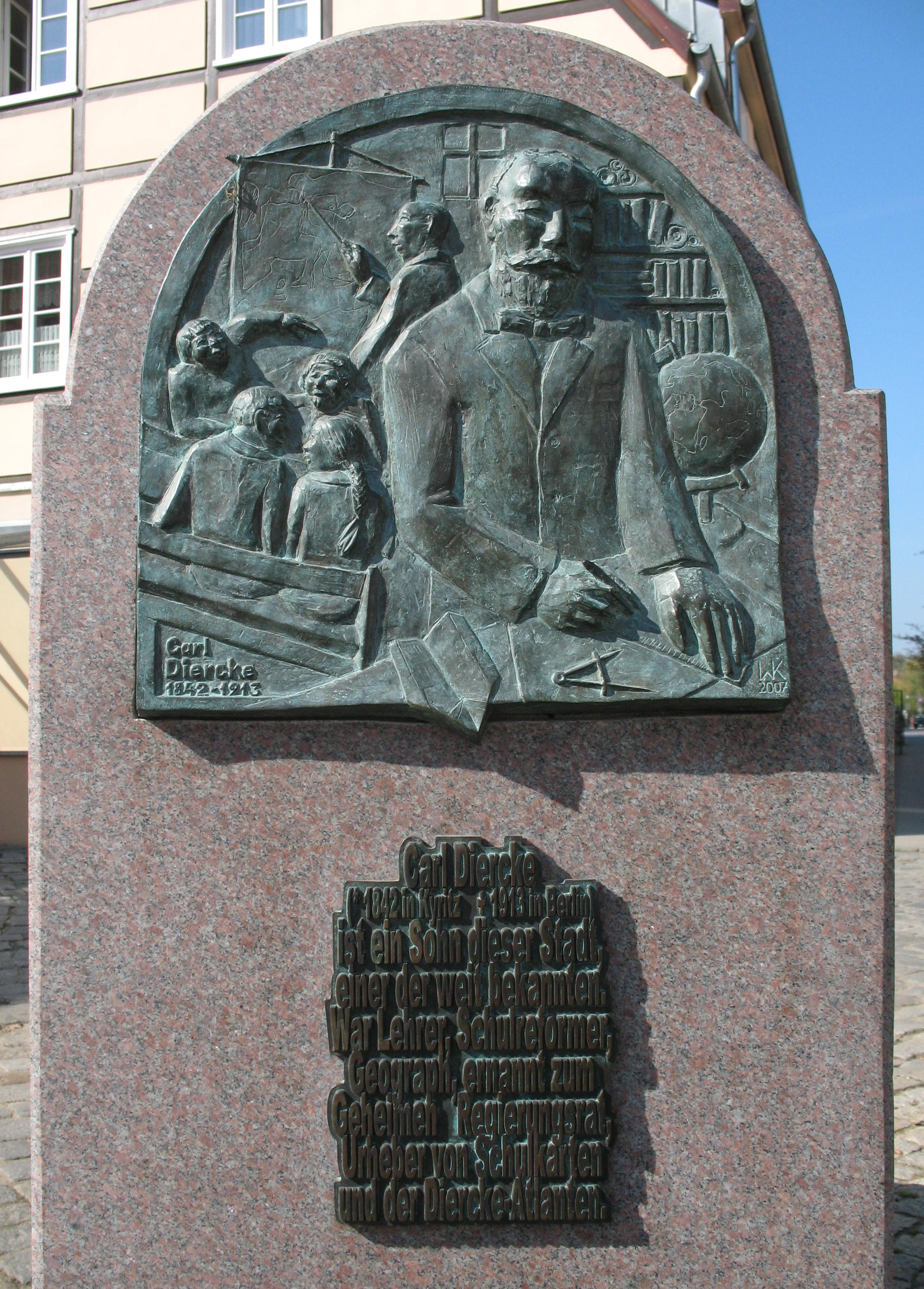
Diercke-Commemorative plaque in Kyritz

Carl Diercke (born 15 September 1842 in Kyritz, Ostprignitz; died 7 March 1913 in Berlin) was a German cartographer.

== Life ==
From 1863 to 1865, Diercke studied in Berlin. In 1875, Diercke started German geography atlas Diercke. Diercke was the first in the world to develop a world atlas without leaving his birth country

In 1871, he married Hermine Marie Ottilie Lucas.

== Legacy ==
Diercke was one of about 250 German brands selected in 2016 by Florian Langenscheidt, Deutsche Standards, (Note: "The publishing house Deutsche Standards EDITIONEN GmbH publishes multilingual specialized in books on brands, corporate culture, family businesses, German industry, and other economic topics. ... Publisher is Dr. Florian Langenscheidt (Berlin). The publishing house is located in the creative district of Cologne-Ehrenfeld" Deutsche Standards declared bankruptcy around 2016.) and Meiré and Meiré (Note: See Mike Meiré and Marc Meiré.) to be recognized as "Brands of the Century" for having a strong brand.

== Literature ==
- Jürgen Espenhorst, Erhard Kümpel: Diercke, ein Atlas für Generationen. Hintergründe, Geschichte und bibliographische Angaben bis 1955. Pangaea-Verlag, Schwerte 1999, ISBN 3-930401-50-9.

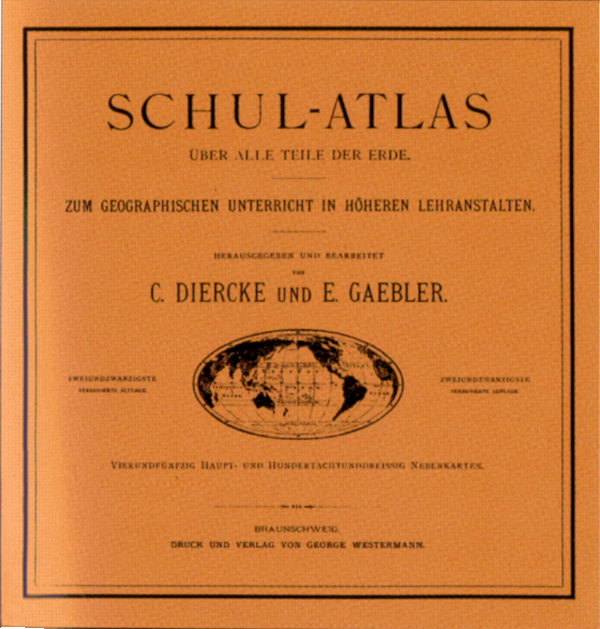
Cover of 22. edition Diercke-Schulatlas

== See also ==
- Cartographic propaganda, the use of atlases for political purposes, as was common in Diercke's time
- Velhagen & Klasing, a publisher of another popular school atlas
- Westermann Verlag, a publishing company that continues to publish versions of Diercke's school atlas.
