= Wilhelm Ludwig Sayn-Wittgenstein =

Prussian politician (1770–1851)

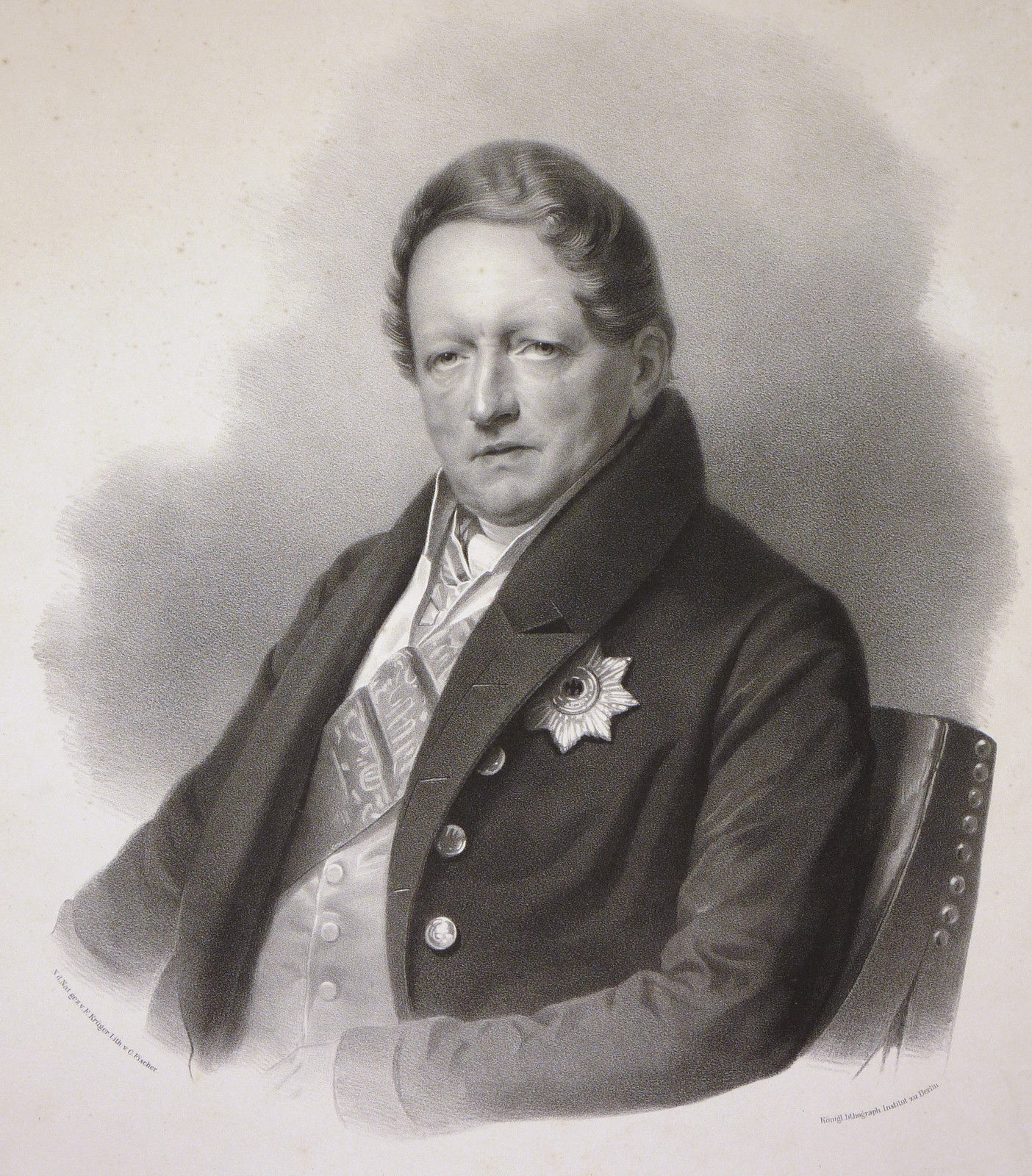
- Wilhelm Ludwig Georg zu Sayn-Wittgenstein-Hohenstein (Lithograph, Berlin ca. 1820)
- Born: October 9, 1770
- Died: April 11, 1851 (aged 80)
- Known for: Prussian statesman

Wilhelm Ludwig Georg, Fürst zu Sayn-Wittgenstein-Hohenstein (October 9, 1770 - April 11, 1851) was a Prussian statesman and confidant of Friedrich Wilhelm III who once held the post of Interior Minister of Prussia. With Karl Albert von Kamptz, the Justice minister, he contributed significantly to the end of the Prussian reforms and was one of the driving forces of the Restoration era in Prussia.

== Early life ==
Born into an ancient House of Sayn-Wittgenstein, Wilhelm Ludwig was the second son and youngest child of Imperial Count Johann Ludwig zu Sayn-Wittgenstein-Hohenstein (1740-1796) and his wife, Countess Friederike Karoline Luise von Pückler-Limpurg (1738-1772), daughter of Count Christian Wilhelm Karl von Pückler-Groditz (1705-1786) and Countess Karoline Christiane von Löwenstein-Wertheim-Virneburg (1719-1793).

== Life ==
He studied law at University of Marburg in 1786. After graduation, he became a courtier of Charles Theodore, Elector of Bavaria. Between 1797 and 1806, he was the Oberhofmeister of Prussian Queen Frederica Louisa of Hesse-Darmstadt. In 1804, he was elevated to the rank of Imperial Prince. With the help of Sophie Marie von Voß, his family friend, Wittgenstein was brought into king Friedrich Wilhelm III's circle. Following Prussian defeat in the Battle of Jena–Auerstedt in 1806, he went to Great Britain for a loan and British military intervention. He didn't succeed in the diplomatic mission and was arrested in Hamburg by the French.

After the Prussian court returned to Berlin and Potsdam, Wittgenstein became Lord Chamberlain in 1810. He helped reappoint Karl August von Hardenberg and advocated closer ties with France. From 1812, he became the head of Prussian police as Privy Councilor of State and began persecution of the liberal and national movement in Prussia. He broke up Tugendbund and took part in the arrest of Justus von Gruner. During the German campaign of 1813, he lost influence for a moment.

Nevertheless, Wittgenstein became Minister of Police in 1814 and in this capacity also a member of the Prussian Council of State from 1817. He was in close contact with Klemens von Metternich and exerted influence in Metternich's interest. Along with the crown prince, later Friedrich Wilhelm IV, he was one of the leaders of the reactionary party in opposition to Prussian reforms led by Hardenberg. After the assassination of August von Kotzebue, he pushed forward the reactionary reorganization of German Confederation and the 'Persecution of Demagogues' and implemented Carlsbad Decrees strictly. In 1819 he resigned as Minister of Police and became Minister of the Royal House but continued the policy of reaction.

Wittgenstein and his reactionary circles in the Prussian court harassed and spied upon Hegel and his pupils, such as Leopold von Henning, Friedrich Wilhelm Carové etc.

Wilhelm never married and didn't have any children.
