= Velhagen & Klasing =

German publishing company

Velhagen & Klasing was a major German publishing company in the nineteenth and twentieth centuries.

== History ==
=== Long nineteenth century ===
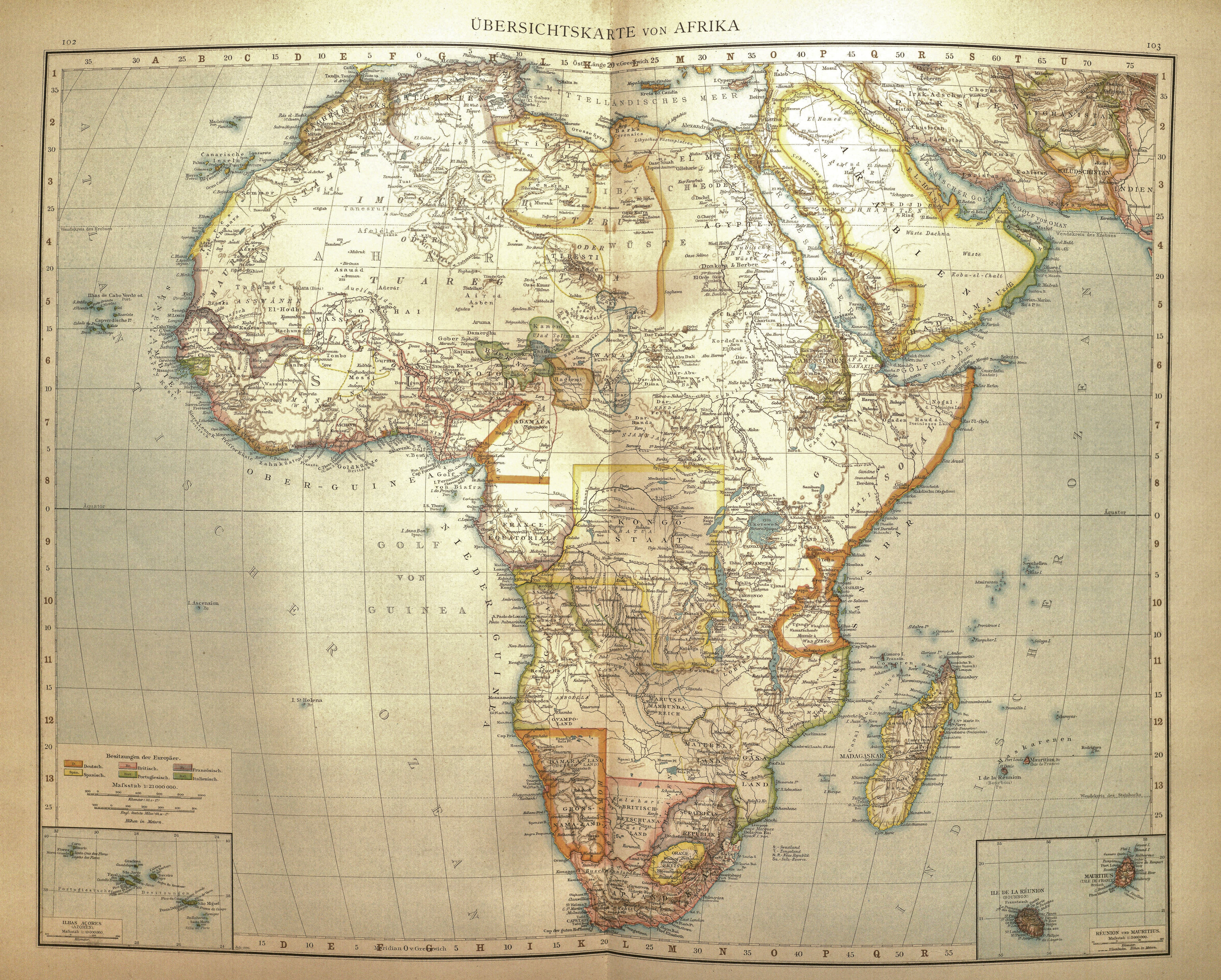
Übersichtskarte von Afrika, 1886 (published in Andree's Allgemeiner Handatlas, 1887)

Velhagen & Klasing's first major success was the popular cookbook of Henriette Davidis from 1844 to 1875. The company earned 2,762 Thaler in the cookbook's peak sales year in 1858, or the equivalent of over US$40,000 in 2021. Davidis argued fiercely with the company over her compensation, and her royalty payment increased from 50 to 1000 Thaler over its publication history.

In the 1870s and 1880s, Velhagen & Klasing sold two-thirds of its Lutheran and patriotic works through Colporteur salesmen, at the time a new method of marketing through door-to-door salesmen. (Note: Occupational breakdown of Velhagen & Klasing's consumers is available in Fullerton (2015, p. 246))

Another area that Velhagen & Klasing emphasized was geography textbooks. In this area, Ferdinand Hirt, who published Ernst von Seydlitz's works, was their major competitor. In the mid-to-late 1800s, Hirt & Sohn (Note: Founded by Arnold Hirt) and Velhagen & Klasing together had an oligopoly in the German textbook market.

Velhagen & Klasing was also dominant in popular children's literature. Their popular novels for girls in this era conveyed largely the same values as their schoolbooks, namely virtue, piety, self-sacrifice, and docility.

In the late nineteenth century, Velhagen & Klasing published a number of very popular adventure novels by S. Wörishöffer. She was hired by Velhagen & Klasing to rewrite an unsuccessful novel by a previously unpublished writer, Max Bischoff, which resulted in Robert des Schiffsjungen (1877). The publisher intentionally hid the identity of Wörishöffer, who was not the world traveling male that the novels implied, in order to preserve their credibility.

In 1886, they began publishing the illustrated family monthly, Velhagen & Klasing's Monatshefte, which included reviews by Carl Hermann Busse.

In 1901, they bought the publishing company of Georg Wilhelm Ferdinand Müller (1806–1875) from his heirs. Müller's work consisted primarily of textbooks.

The publisher had significant involvement in the Leipzig Geographical Society, known as Geographischer Abend.

=== After World War I ===
When World War I caused a redrawing of national boundaries, some publishers, such as Columbus Verlag of Berlin, began developing geographical maps which ignored territorial boundaries. Velhagen & Klasing rejected this shift and focused on territorial boundaries. Velhagen & Klasing published the second most popular school atlas in Germany in the 1920s, after the one made by Carl Diercke. Their atlases in this era were examples of cartographic propaganda intentionally designed to promote German nationalism, as had their other textbooks since the nineteenth century. The trend to expand the borders of Germany and German cultural influence in Velhagen & Klasing's maps began in the late 1920s, and by 1933 their maps contained large-scale falsifications.

Velhagen & Klasing was one of many who profited from the closure of Jewish and left-wing publishing companies during the Nazi Party's rise to power in the 1930s.
