= Annemarie Gethmann-Siefert =

German philosophy professor

Annemarie Gethmann-Siefert (born 1945) is a professor of philosophy at the university of Hagen, Germany.

== Biography ==
Gethmann-Siefert was born in 1945, studied philosophy, art history and theology in Münster, Bonn, Innsbruck and Bochum. She earned her PhD in philosophy 1973 from the Ruhr University Bochum writing her dissertation about Heidegger and her habilitation 1982 about Hegel's Aesthetics. She taught since 1991 at the Fernuniversität Hagen.

== Research fields ==
- Aesthetics and Art Theory
- Anthropology and Ethics
- Philosophy of Religion
- History of Philosophy
- Philosophy of German Idealism

== Major works ==
- Das Verhältnis von Philosophie und Theologie im Denken Martin Heideggers. Freiburg/München 1975
- Die Funktion der Kunst in der Geschichte. Untersuchungen zu Hegels Ästhetik. Bonn 1984 (Hegel-Studien. Beiheft 25)
- Heidegger und die praktische Philosophie. Ed. by A. Gethmann-Siefert and Otto Pöggeler. Frankfurt a.M. 1988 (STW 694)
- Ist die Kunst tot und zu Ende? Überlegungen zu Hegels Ästhetik. Erlangen und Jena 1993 (Jenaer philosophische Vorträge und Studien. 7)
- Einführung in die philosophische Ästhetik. München 1995 (UTB 1995)
- Einführung in Hegels Ästhetik. München 2005 (UTB 2646) ISBN 3-8252-2646-8

== Works in English ==
- Martin Heidegger and Theology. In: Being and Truth. Essays in Honour of John Macquarrie. Ed. by A. Kee and E. T. Long. London 1986, 18–42.
- Heidegger and Hölderlin: The Over-Usage of "Poets in an Impoverished Time". In: Heidegger Studies (1990), 59–88.
- Consultation instead of prescription - a model for the structure of the doctor-patient relationship. In: Poiesis & Praxis. International Journal of Ethics of Science and Technology Assessment Nr 1. Vol. 2 (2003).
