= Kyritz =

- Town
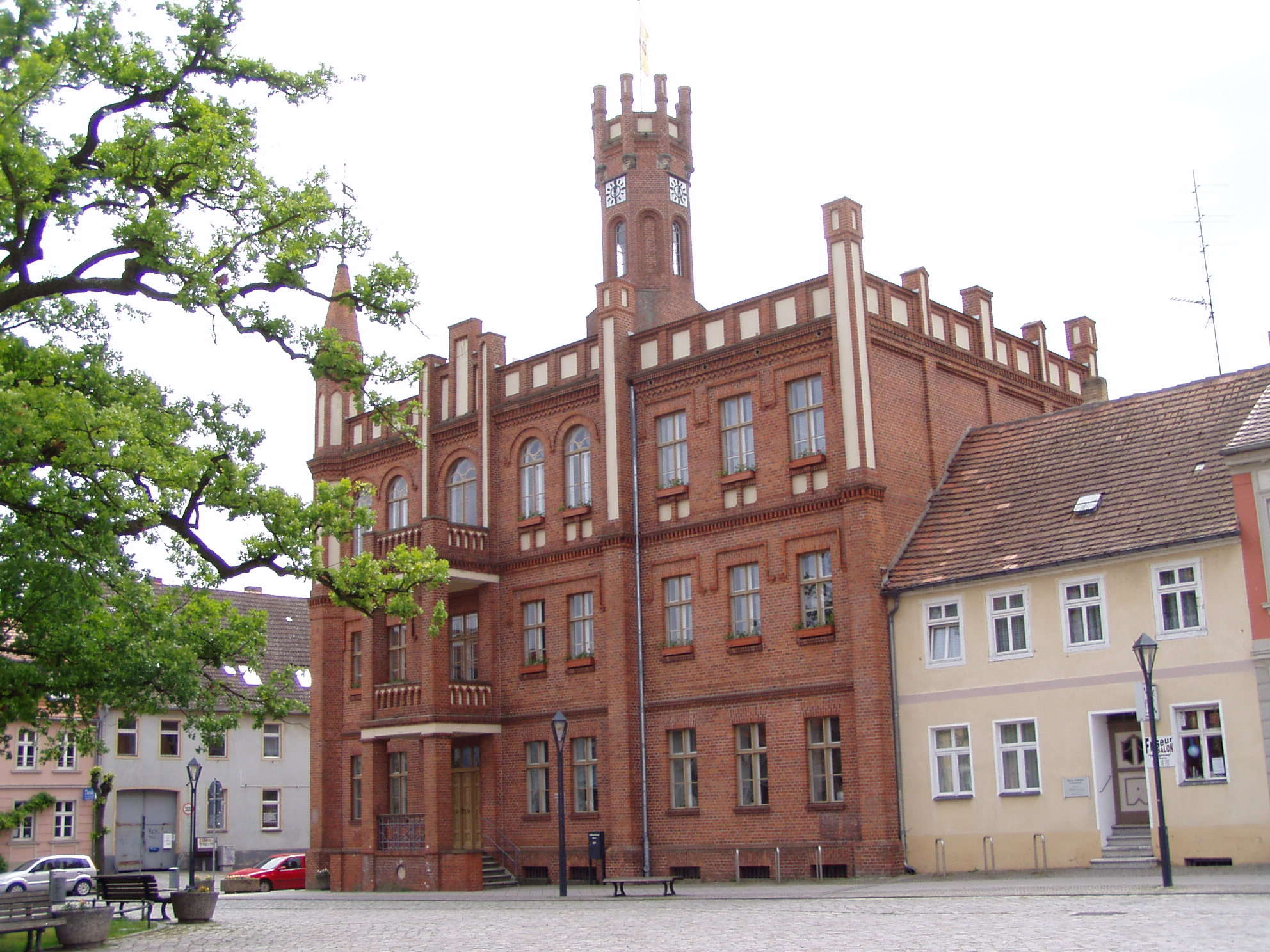
- Town hall

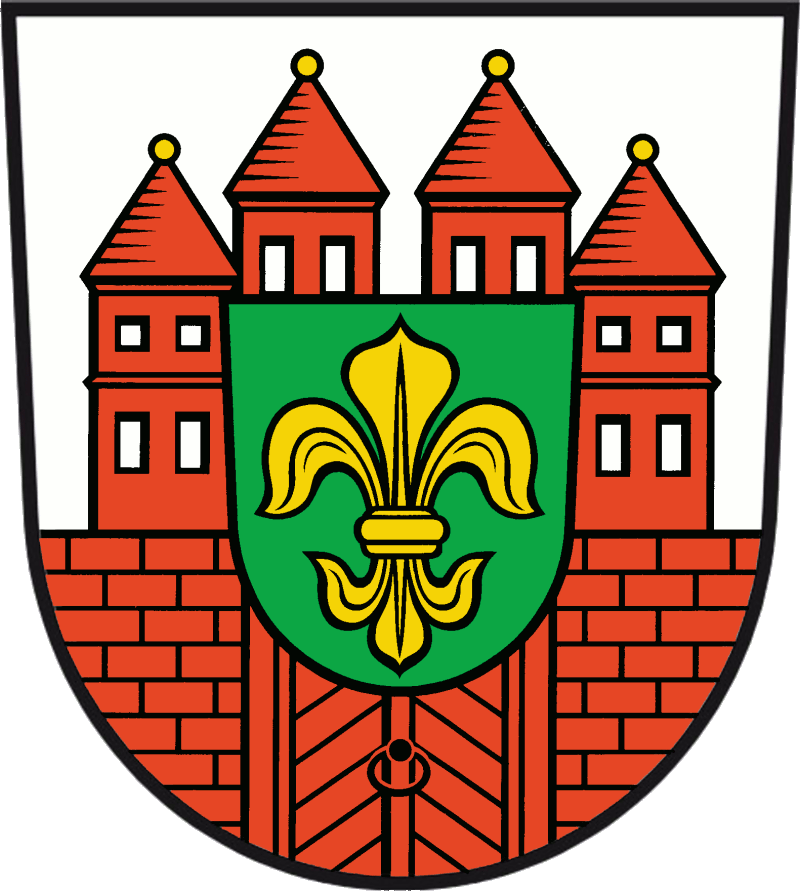
- Coat of arms

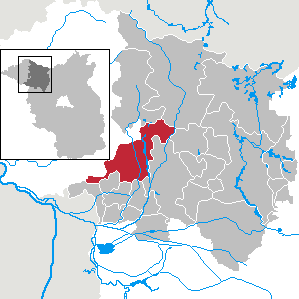
- Location of Kyritz within Ostprignitz-Ruppin district
- Interactive map of Kyritz
- Location within Germany Location within Brandenburg
- Coordinates: 52°57′00″N 12°24′00″E
- Country: Germany
- State: Brandenburg
- District: Ostprignitz-Ruppin
- Subdivisions: Kyritz and 12 town districts

Government
  - Mayor (2018–26): Nora Görke (SPD)

Area
  - Total: 157.38 km^{2} (60.76 sq mi)
- Elevation: 42 m (138 ft)

Population (2025-12-31)
  - Total: 9,059
  - Density: 57.56/km^{2} (149.1/sq mi)
- Time zone: UTC+01:00 (CET)
  - Summer (DST): UTC+02:00 (CEST)
- Postal codes: 16866
- Dialling codes: 03 39 71
- Vehicle registration: OPR, KY, NP, WK
- Website: www.kyritz.de

Kyritz (German pronunciation: [ˈkyːʁɪts]) is a town in the Ostprignitz-Ruppin district, in Brandenburg, Germany. It is situated 28 km (17 mi) west of Neuruppin and 28 km (17 mi) southeast of Pritzwalk. The town has 9,260 inhabitants (2019).

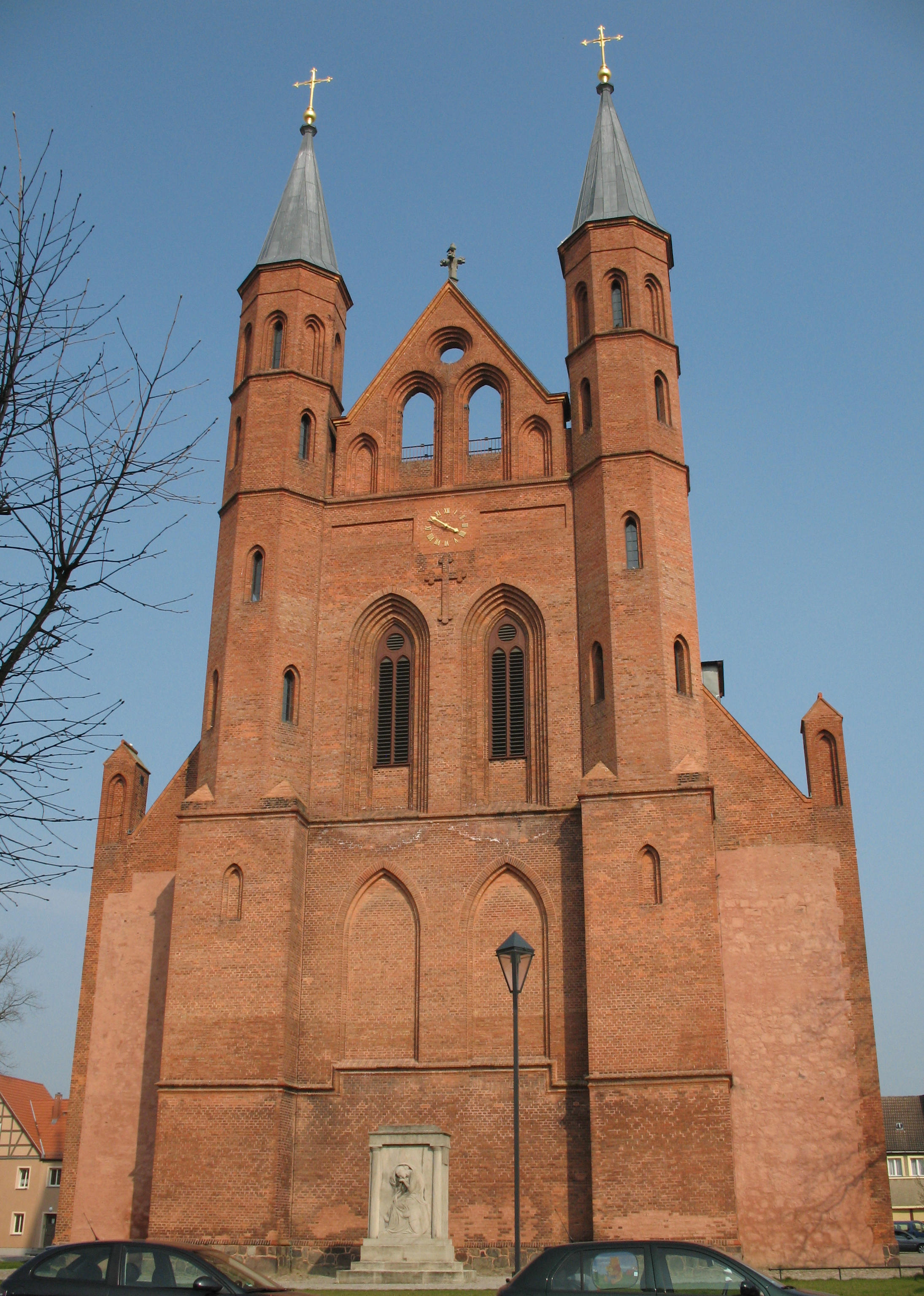
Saint Mary's church

== Overview ==
The town is situated near the Kyritzer Seenkette, literally "Kyritz chain of lakes". The town is nicknamed "Kyritz an der Knatter" (Kyritz at the Rattle). The noise of numerous water mills along a stream parallel to the river Jäglitz was the reason for this nickname. This river channel does not exist anymore. The town includes the districts Berlitt, Bork, Drewen, Gantikow, Ganz, Holzhausen, Kötzlin, Lellichow, Mechow, Rehfeld and Teetz.

== History ==
The oldest document mentioning the area around Kyritz as "Chorizi" was written in 948. The region was called "Prignitz". The name is derived from the Slavic word "pregynica" meaning "inaccessible woods". A castle was built here in 1148, and little by little a town developed close to the castle. In the year 1225 a Franciscan friary was established here (dissolved in 1552). The first document in which the name "Kyritz" was mentioned dates from 1232. It obtained municipal status in 1237 and got the privilege to produce its own coins. A wall around the town was built in the 14th century. Kyritz became a member of the Hanseatic League in 1359. The merchants living in Kyritz sold wheat, clothes, wood, wool, linnen and hop to other member towns of the Hanseatic League and they bought metals, spices, wine and fish from other places. Goods from Lübeck, the headquarters of the Hanseatic League, were sold duty-free in Kyritz. In 1488 the first brewery was founded in Kyritz. The beer was named "Mord und Totschlag" (Murder and Manslaughter) and it is still brewed in Neuzelle.

In 1600 Count Hans Christoff von Königsmarck was born in Kötzlin, a leading Swedish general in the Thirty Years' War who is most famous for attempting to conquer Prague in 1648. In 1626, 800 citizens of Kyritz died from the bubonic plague. From 1806 to 1814 Kyritz was occupied by French soldiers. After Napoleon's defeat n 1814 the "Peace Oak" was planted in the Market Place.

From 1815 to 1945, Kyritz was part of the Prussian Province of Brandenburg. From 1952 to 1990, it was part of the Bezirk Potsdam of East Germany.

== Sights ==
St. Mary's Church was founded in the 14th century. It burnt down in the Thirty Years' War in 1622 and was not rebuilt before 1714. Inside there is a pulpit dating from 1714 and a baptismal font from the 16th century. The Town Hall was built with a clock tower in 1879 and renovated in 1994 and 2013. The Oak of Peace in the Market place was planted in 1814 after Napoleon's defeat. There are various half-timbered houses in Kyritz dating from the 18th and 19th century, e.g. Eichhorstsches Haus in Johann-Sebastian-Bach-Str. dating from 1663 which is famous for its wood-carvings. A part of the medieval wall consisting of bricks around the town is well-preserved. The wall was renovated in 2013. At the end of Mauerstraße a half round defensive tower was transformed into a residential building, a house of this kind is called "Wiekhaus" in German.

== Climate ==
Climate data for Kyritz (1991–2020 normals)
Month	Jan	Feb	Mar	Apr	May	Jun	Jul	Aug	Sep	Oct	Nov	Dec	Year
Mean daily maximum °C (°F)	3.5 (38.3)	4.5 (40.1)	9.0 (48.2)	15.2 (59.4)	19.4 (66.9)	22.8 (73.0)	24.8 (76.6)	24.5 (76.1)	20.0 (68.0)	13.9 (57.0)	7.8 (46.0)	4.4 (39.9)	14.3 (57.7)
Daily mean °C (°F)	1.0 (33.8)	1.5 (34.7)	4.5 (40.1)	9.4 (48.9)	13.7 (56.7)	17.0 (62.6)	18.9 (66.0)	18.5 (65.3)	14.4 (57.9)	9.5 (49.1)	5.0 (41.0)	2.1 (35.8)	9.7 (49.5)
Mean daily minimum °C (°F)	−1.8 (28.8)	−1.8 (28.8)	0.3 (32.5)	3.5 (38.3)	7.4 (45.3)	10.7 (51.3)	13.0 (55.4)	12.6 (54.7)	9.1 (48.4)	5.4 (41.7)	2.1 (35.8)	−0.4 (31.3)	5.0 (41.0)
Average precipitation mm (inches)	51.0 (2.01)	35.0 (1.38)	37.0 (1.46)	24.8 (0.98)	47.2 (1.86)	62.5 (2.46)	76.3 (3.00)	58.4 (2.30)	52.3 (2.06)	48.3 (1.90)	43.5 (1.71)	44.1 (1.74)	591.7 (23.30)
Average precipitation days (≥ 1.0 mm)	16.9	13.4	13.4	10.5	13.0	13.5	14.7	13.6	12.0	14.1	15.8	18.1	169.2
Average relative humidity (%)	87.7	83.6	78.5	69.7	69.7	70.4	71.2	72.8	78.2	85.1	90.4	90.0	78.9
Mean monthly sunshine hours	59.3	89.8	146.6	192.0	218.9	240.2	253.3	235.2	183.7	108.5	62.5	46.6	1,835.4
Source: World Meteorological Organization

== Demography ==
Development of population since 1875 within the current Boundaries (Blue Line: Population; Dotted Line: Comparison to Population development in Brandenburg state; Grey Background: Time of Nazi Germany; Red Background: Time of communist East Germany)

Recent Population Development and Projections (Population Development before Census 2011 (blue line); Recent Population Development according to the Census in Germany in 2011 (blue bordered line); Official projections for 2005–30 (yellow line); for 2017–30 (scarlet line); for 2020–30 (green line)

Kyritz: Population development
within the current boundaries (2020)

Year	Pop.	±% p.a.
1875	7,639	—
1890	7,911	+0.23%
1910	7,960	+0.03%
1925	8,656	+0.56%
1939	8,839	+0.15%
1950	13,575	+3.98%
1964	11,653	−1.08%

Year	Pop.	±% p.a.
1971	12,477	+0.98%
1981	12,076	−0.33%
1985	12,085	+0.02%
1990	11,727	−0.60%
1995	11,442	−0.49%
2000	10,847	−1.06%
2005	10,158	−1.30%

Year	Pop.	±% p.a.
2010	9,537	−1.25%
2015	9,100	−0.93%
2016	9,192	+1.01%
2017	9,375	+1.99%
2018	9,303	−0.77%
2019	9,260	−0.46%
2020	9,281	+0.23%

== Twin towns and sister cities ==
Kyritz is twinned with:

- Bailleul, France
- Svalöv, Sweden
- Wałcz, Poland
- Werne, Germany

== Photogallery ==
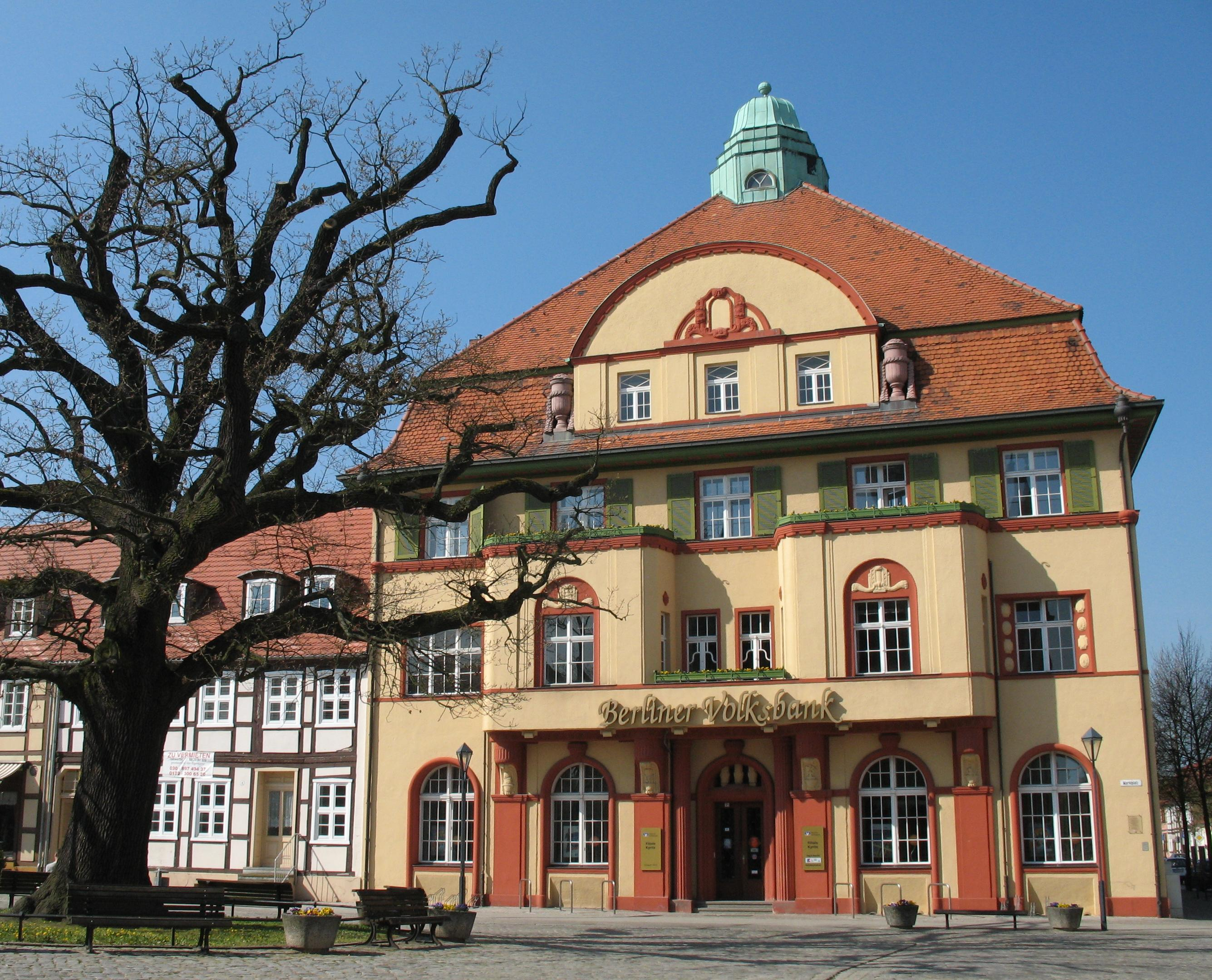
Oak of Peace and bank in the Market Place

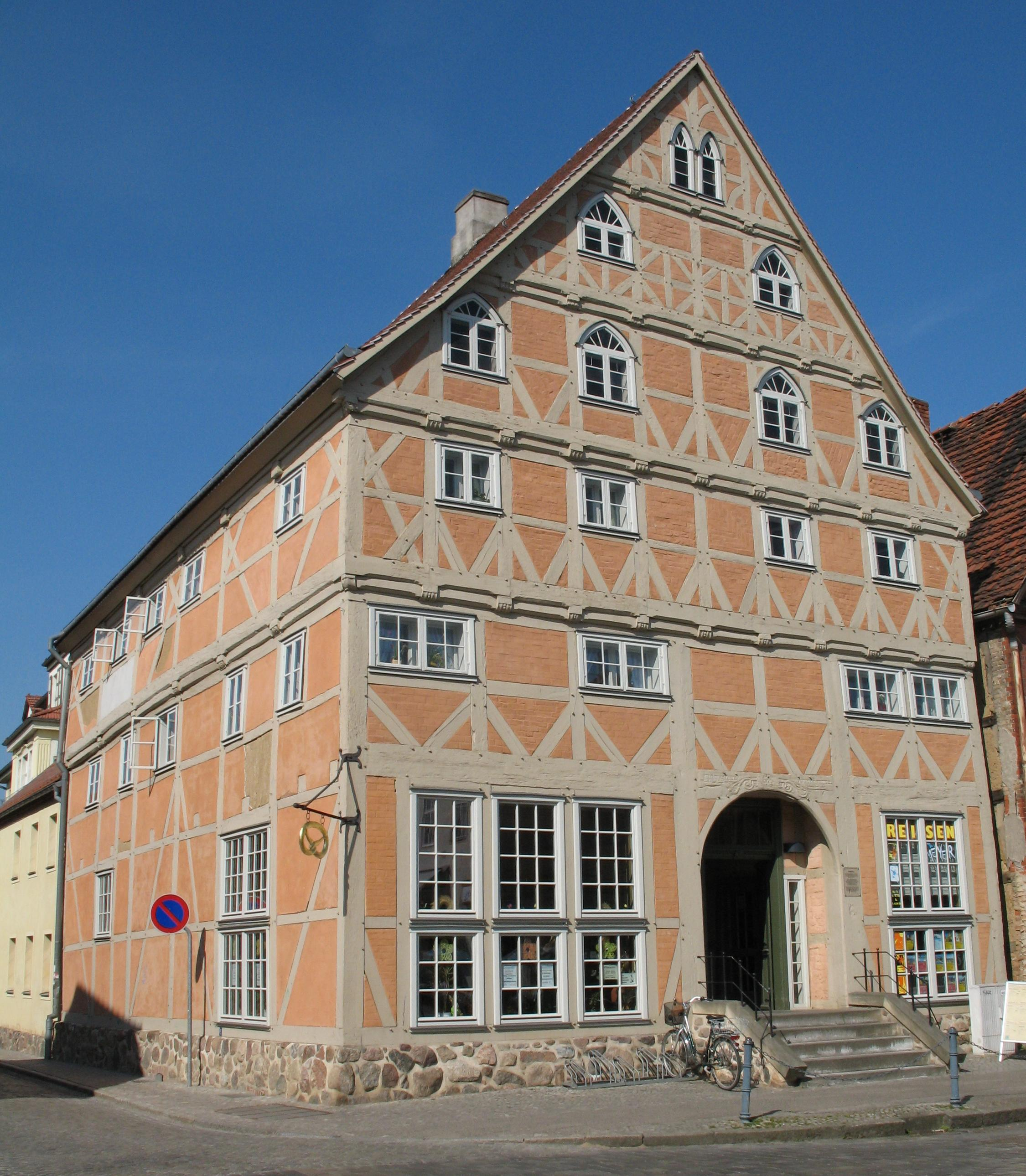
Half-timbered house dating from 1663

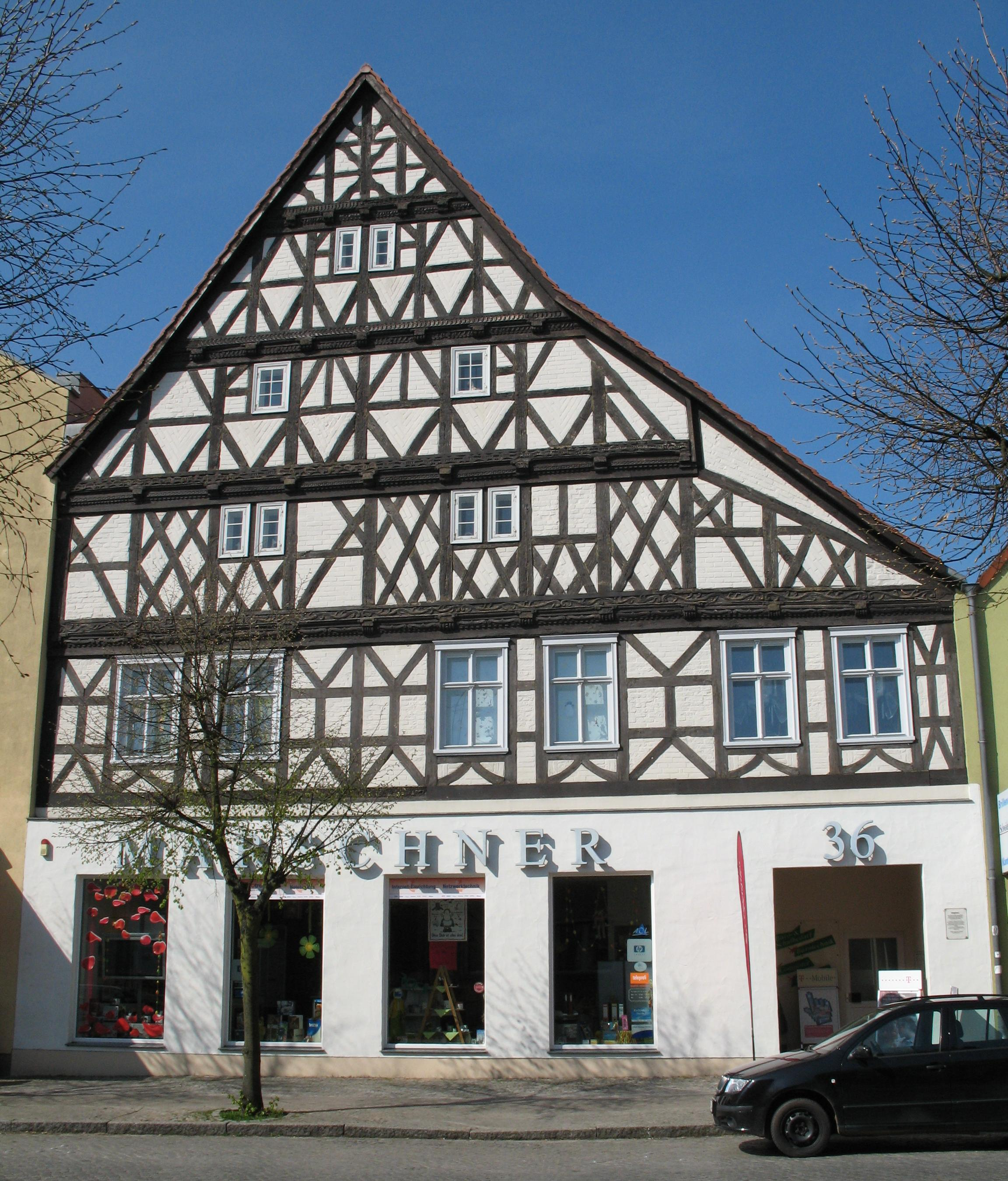
Half-timbered house dating from 1682

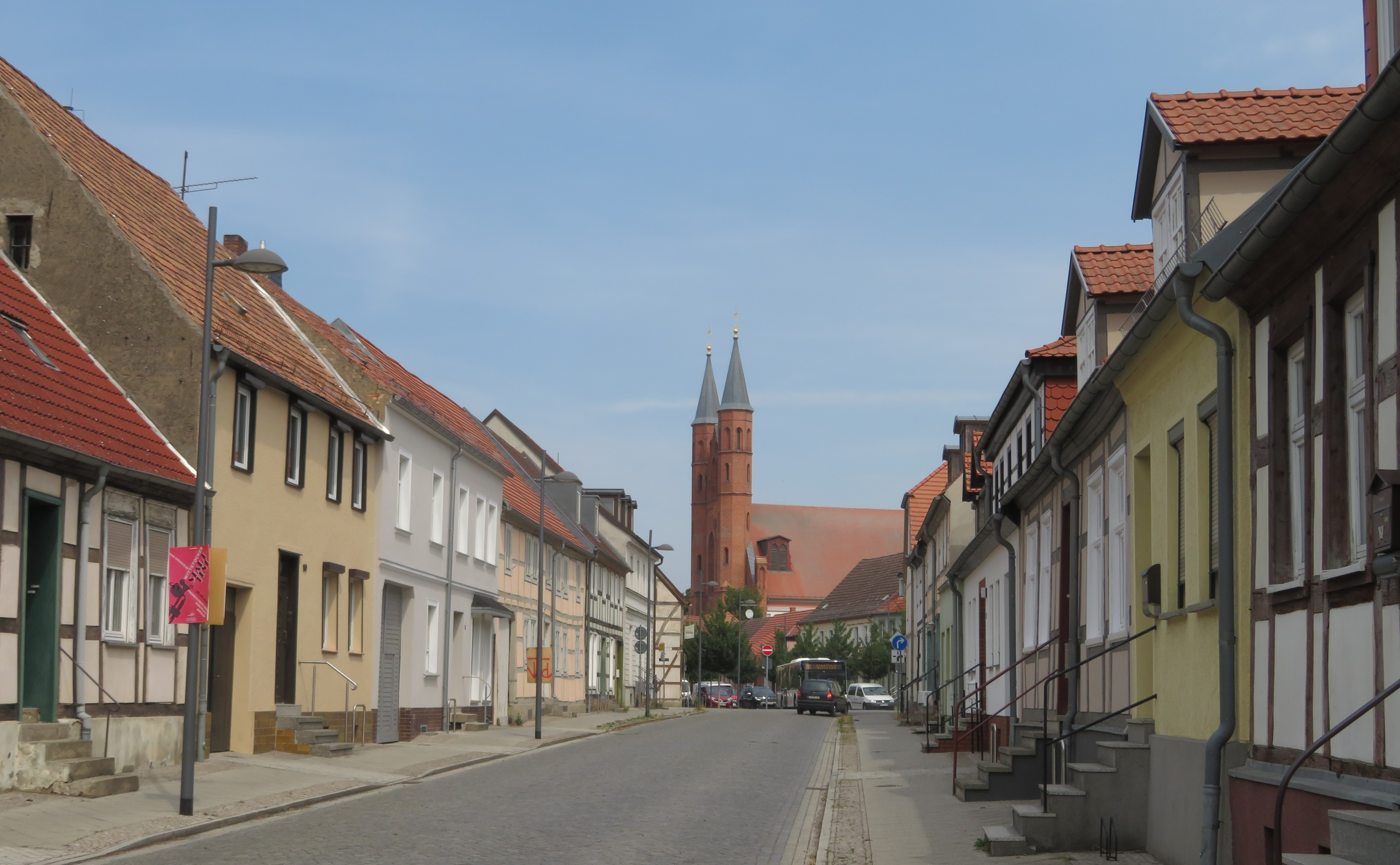
Holzhausen Street, St. Mary's Church

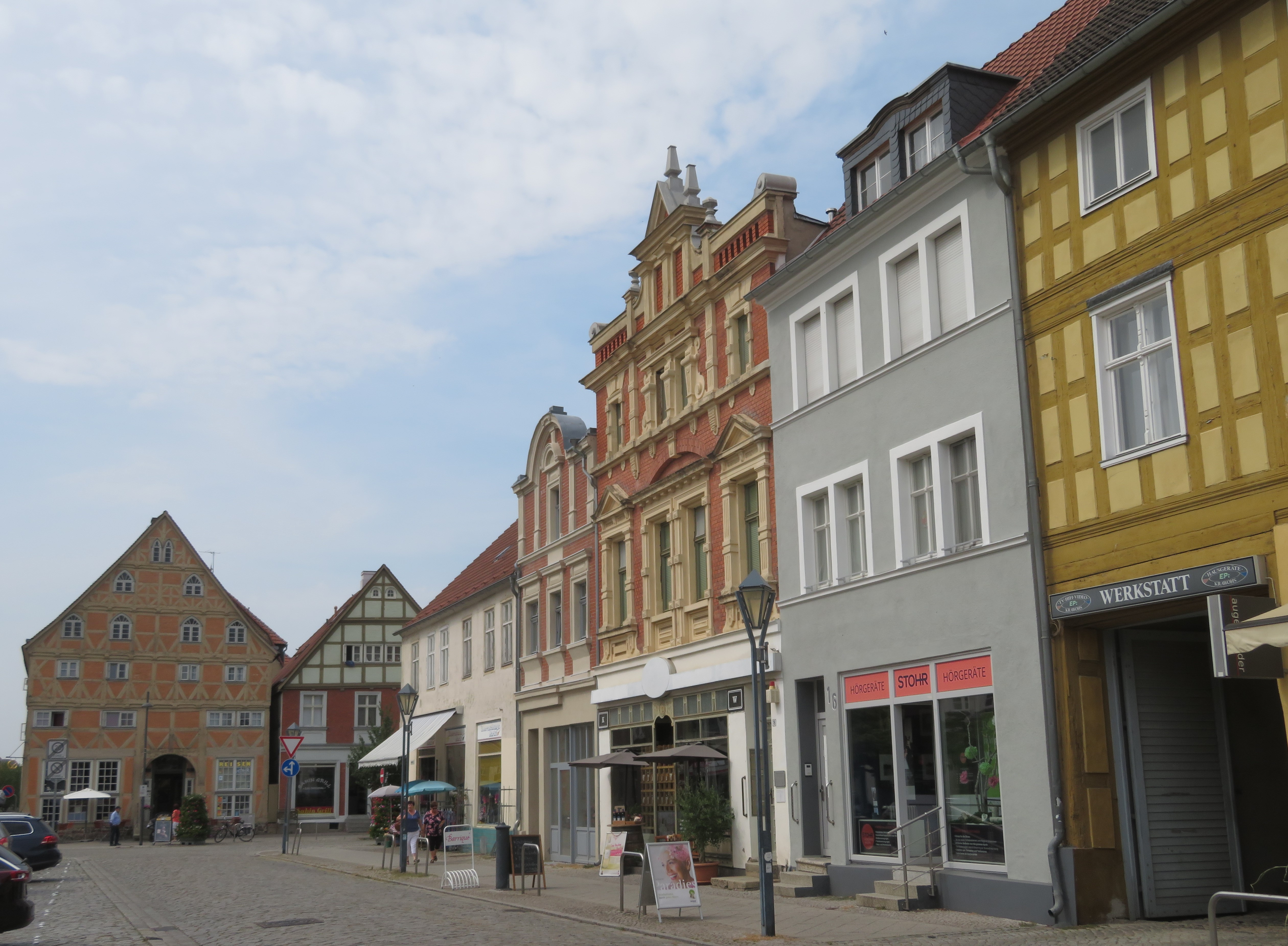
Market Place

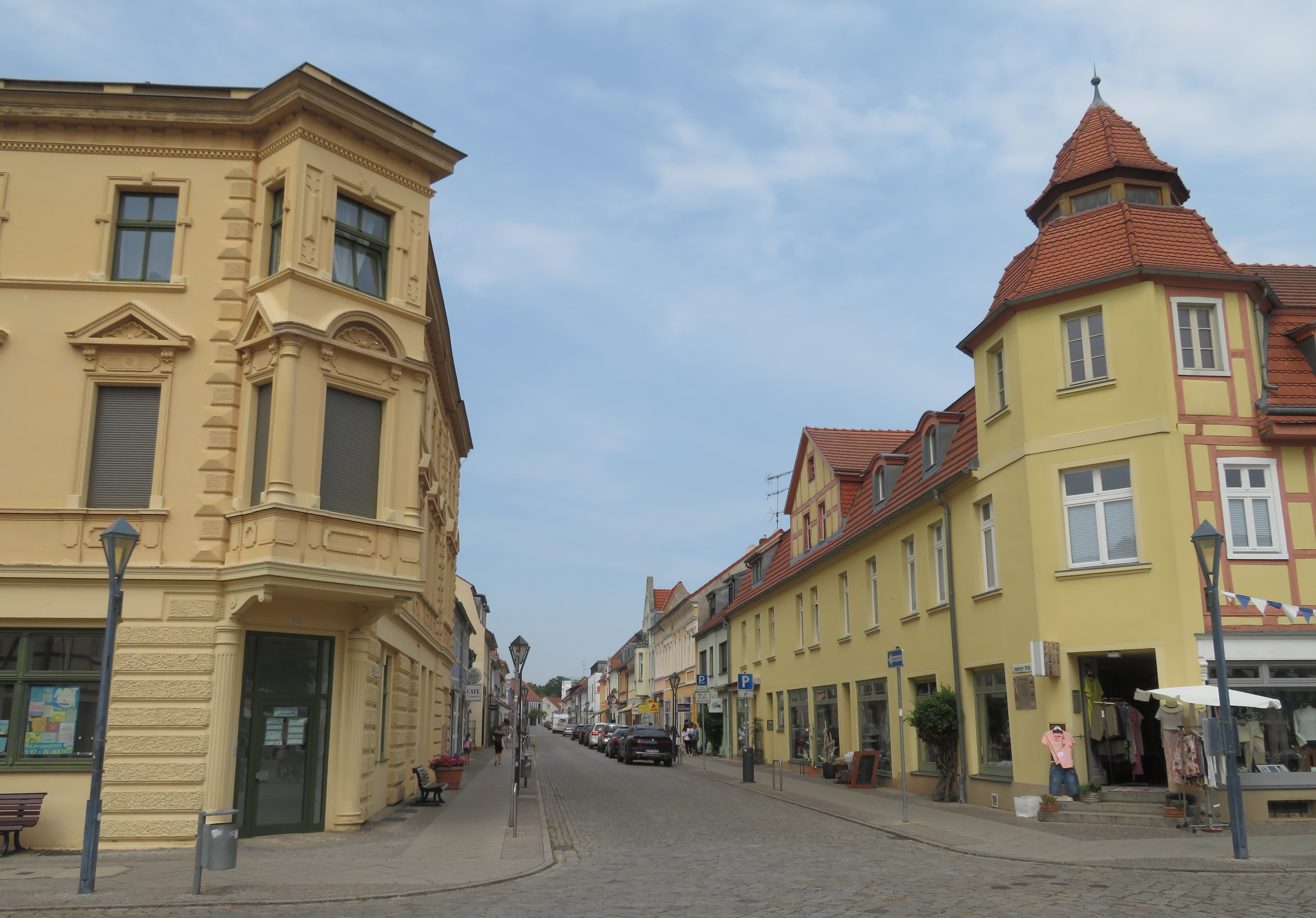
Hamburg Road

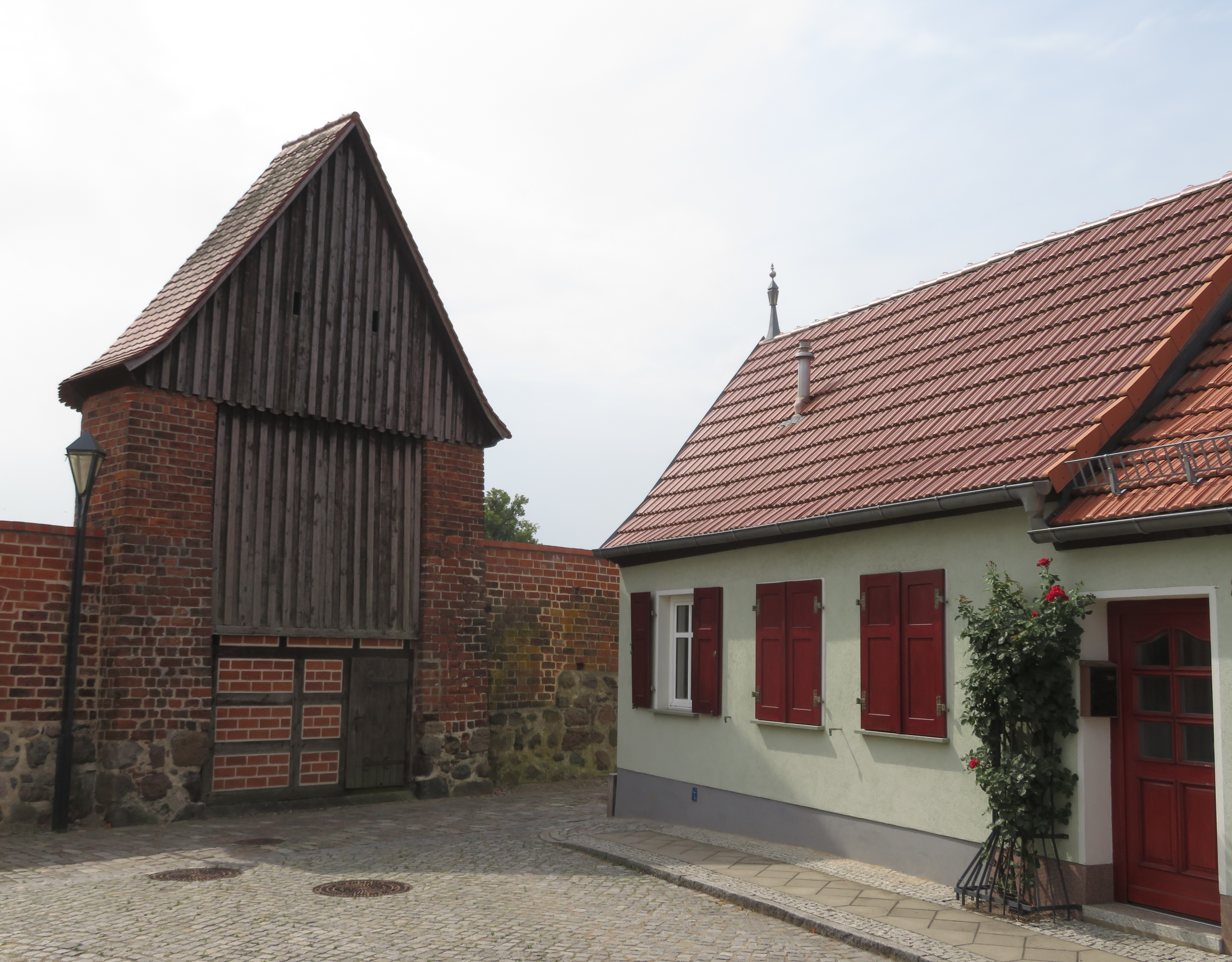
Medieval wall

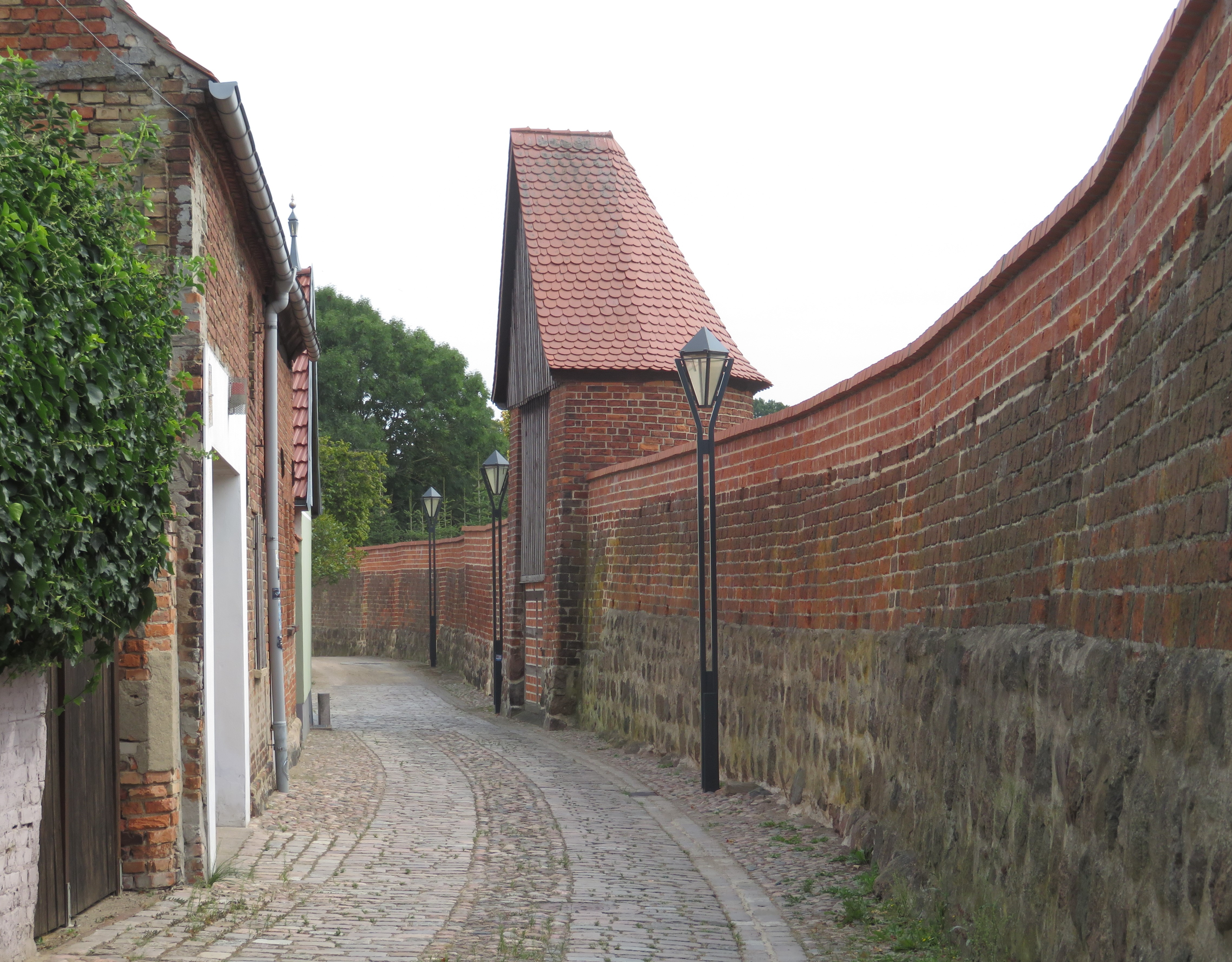
Medieval wall

== People ==
- Carl Diercke (1842-1913), German cartographer
