= Klaus Vieweg =

German university teacher and writer

Klaus Vieweg (German: [ˈfiːveːk]; born 2 August 1953) is a German philosopher, Hegel scholar and biographer. He is a professor of philosophy at the University of Jena. In 2022, Vieweg discovered 4,000 pages of previously undocumented Hegel lectures.

== Research ==
Vieweg was born in Steinach, Thuringia, East Germany. He studied philosophy at the University of Jena and the Humboldt University in East Berlin in the 1970s. He specializes in German idealism, the history and theory of skepticism and fundamental questions of a philosophy of freedom. At the center of his research is the attempt to demonstrate the topicality of Hegel's philosophy as a thinking of freedom. The main contributions to this are the articles on Hegel's strategy of including the core ideas of philosophical skepticism as the 'free' side of philosophy, an overall interpretation of one of Hegel's most influential work, the Elements of the Philosophy of Right, and a new biography of Hegel. He is currently working on outlines for a new history of philosophy.

Vieweg's research and teaching visits have taken him to the University of Washington in Seattle, the universities of Tübingen, Heidelberg and Erlangen, the Hegel Archive at Ruhr University Bochum (Hegel Archive), Charles University in Prague, the University of Pisa, the Universities of Siena and Turin, the University of Vienna, Monash University in Melbourne, Mexico City, Medellín, Naples, Tokyo, Kyoto, Rome, Fudan University and East China University in Shanghai. He has traveled to Chile several times and taught as Johann Gottfried Herder Professor at the Pontifical Catholic University of Valparaíso (PUCV, 2022) and at the Pontifical Catholic University of Santiago de Chile.

A number of Vieweg's books have been translated into several languages, including Korean and Portuguese as well as English, Italian, Spanish and Chinese.

=== Discovery of Hegel's transcripts ===
In 2022, Vieweg discovered 4,000 pages of transcripts of previously unknown Hegel lectures in the library of Roman Catholic Archdiocese of Munich and Freising, which had been stored there for almost 200 years. These notes were written by Friedrich Wilhelm Carové, one of Hegel's students, between 1816 and 1818. They came from the estate of the theologian Friedrich Windischmann and had never been examined in detail by researchers. Vieweg had followed up on a tip from Bonn historian Willi Ferdinand Becker, who had pointed out Windischmann's still unexplored estate in an essay in 1988. Vieweg looked at the material in the summer of 2022 and recognized its full significance. The edition of the scripts can open up new perspectives for Hegel research, specially as compared with Hotho's transcriptions, which are so far the only source on Hegel's philosophy of art.

== Publications ==
=== Author ===
- Hegel: The Philosopher of Freedom. Stanford UP 2023, ISBN 978-1-5036-3057-4
- Anfänge – Eine andere Geschichte der Philosophie. München 2023, ISBN 978-3-406-80654-4
- Hegel: Der Philosoph der Freiheit (Taschenbuchausgabe), München 2023, ISBN 978-3-406-78363-0
- Anfänge. Eine andere Geschichte der Philosophie. Verlag C.H. Beck, München 2023, ISBN 978-3-406-80654-4.
- Hegel: Der Philosoph der Freiheit. Verlag C.H. Beck, München 2020, 3. Auflage, ISBN 978-3-406-74235-4.
- Wozu braucht Gott ein Raumschiff? Die Philosophie in Star Trek. Graff 2016, ISBN 978-3-86425-865-7.
- The Idealism of Freedom – For a Hegelian Turn in Philosophy. Boston/Leiden 2020, ISBN 978-90-04-42926-0
- Das Denken der Freiheit – Hegels Grundlinien der Philosophie des Rechts. Verlag Wilhelm Fink, München 2012, ISBN 978-3-7705-5304-4.
- Genius loci – Philosophische An-Sichten großer Denker und Wort und Bild. Lambert Schneider, Darmstadt 2013, ISBN 978-3-650-40010-9.
- Skepsis und Freiheit. Verlag Wilhelm Fink München, München 2007, ISBN 978-3-7705-4471-4.
- Philosophie des Remis. Der junge Hegel und das „Gespenst des Skepticismus“. München 1999, ISBN 3-7705-3437-9.
- Hegels Philosophie der Kunst (chinesisch), Peking 2018
- O Pensamento da Liberdade (portugiesisch), Sao Paulo 2019
- Was ist die Freiheit? Hegels Rechtsphilosophie und die Moderne (koreanisch), Seoul 2019
- La logica della libertá. Pisa 2017, ISBN 978-88-467-4610-8
- Giuoco piano. Hegels italienische Partie. Acht unveröffentlichte Briefe, Mailand 2017, ISBN 978-88-94801-01-9
- To beam or not to beam? Die Literatur in Star Trek. Ludwigsburg 2020, ISBN 978-3-96658-405-0

=== Editorials (selection) ===
- Rechtsphilosophie nach Hegel. 200 Jahre Grundlinien der Philosophie des Rechts. Hg.: Ino Augsberg, Mansoor Koshan, Jörg Philipp Terhechte, Klaus Vieweg, München 2023
- Der Wille zur Macht. „Werk“ – Wesen – Wirkungen (Jahrbuch Nietzscheforschung Bd. 30) Hg. Johannes Bräuer, Enrico Müller, Klaus Vieweg, Berlin 2023
- 200 Jahre Hegels Grundlinien der Philosophie des Rechts (Hg.: Klaus Vieweg, Benno Zabel, Eberhard Eichenhofer, Stepahn Kirste, Michael Pawlik, Hans-Christoph Schmidt am Busch), Berlin 2021, ISBN 978-3-428-18302-9
- mit Folko Zander: Logik und Moderne. Hegels Wissenschaft der Logik als Paradigma moderner Subjektivität. Boston/Leiden 2021.
- Kant und der Deutsche Idealismus – Handbuch, Darmstadt 2021, ISBN 978-3-534-27353-9
- ·mit Michael N. Forster und Johannes Korngiebel: Idealismus und Romantik in Jena, München 2018
- Friedrich Schlegel und Friedrich Nietzsche. Transzendentalpoesie oder Dichtkunst mit Begriffen (Schlegel Jahrbuch), Paderborn 2008, ISBN 3-506-76493-4
- mit Michael Neil Forster: Idealismus und Romantik. Figuren und Konzepte zwischen 1794 und 1807. Verlag Wilhelm Fink, München 2018, ISBN 978-3-7705-6296-1
- mit Anton Koch, Friedrike Schick und Claudia Wirsing: Hegel. 200 Jahre Wissenschaft der Logik, Hamburg 2014, ISBN 978-3-7873-2526-9.
- G. W. F. Hegel. Die Philosophie der Geschichte. München 2004, ISBN 978-3-7705-4058-7
- mit Brady Bowman: Wissen und Begründung. Die Skeptizismus-Debatte um 1800 im Kontext neuzeitlicher Wissenskonzeptionen. Würzburg 2003, ISBN 3-8260-2696-9.
- mit Brady Bowman: K. F. E. Kirsten, Grundzüge des neuesten Skepticismus in der theoretischen Philosophie zum Gebrauche für Vorlesungen (1802) (Neuedition). Verlag Wilhelm Fink, München 2003, ISBN 3-7705-4095-6.
- Gegen das ‚unphilosophische Unwesen‘. Das Kritische Journal der Philosophie von Schelling und Hegel. Würzburg 2002, ISBN 3-8260-2430-3.
- mit Wolfgang Welsch: Das Interesse des Denkens – Hegel aus heutiger Sicht. München 2004, ISBN 978-3-7705-3927-7
- mit Wolfgang Welsch: Hegels Phänomenologie des Geistes, Frankfurt a. M. 2008, ISBN 978-3-518-29476-5
- Hegels Jenaer Naturphilosophie. München 1998, ISBN 3-7705-3251-1.

=== Literary works ===
- (unter dem Pseudonym Edgar Allan Wolfe) Mr. Spock und der malerische Doppelmord zu Königsleben. Verlag Wilhelm Fink, München 2013, ISBN 978-3-7705-5409-6.
- Klaus Vieweg „Mr. Spock und der malerische Doppelmord in Jena“ (Neuausgabe) Jena 2022, ISBN 978-3-948259-08-2
