= Sophie Marie von Voß =

German lady in waiting and memoirist (1729-1814)

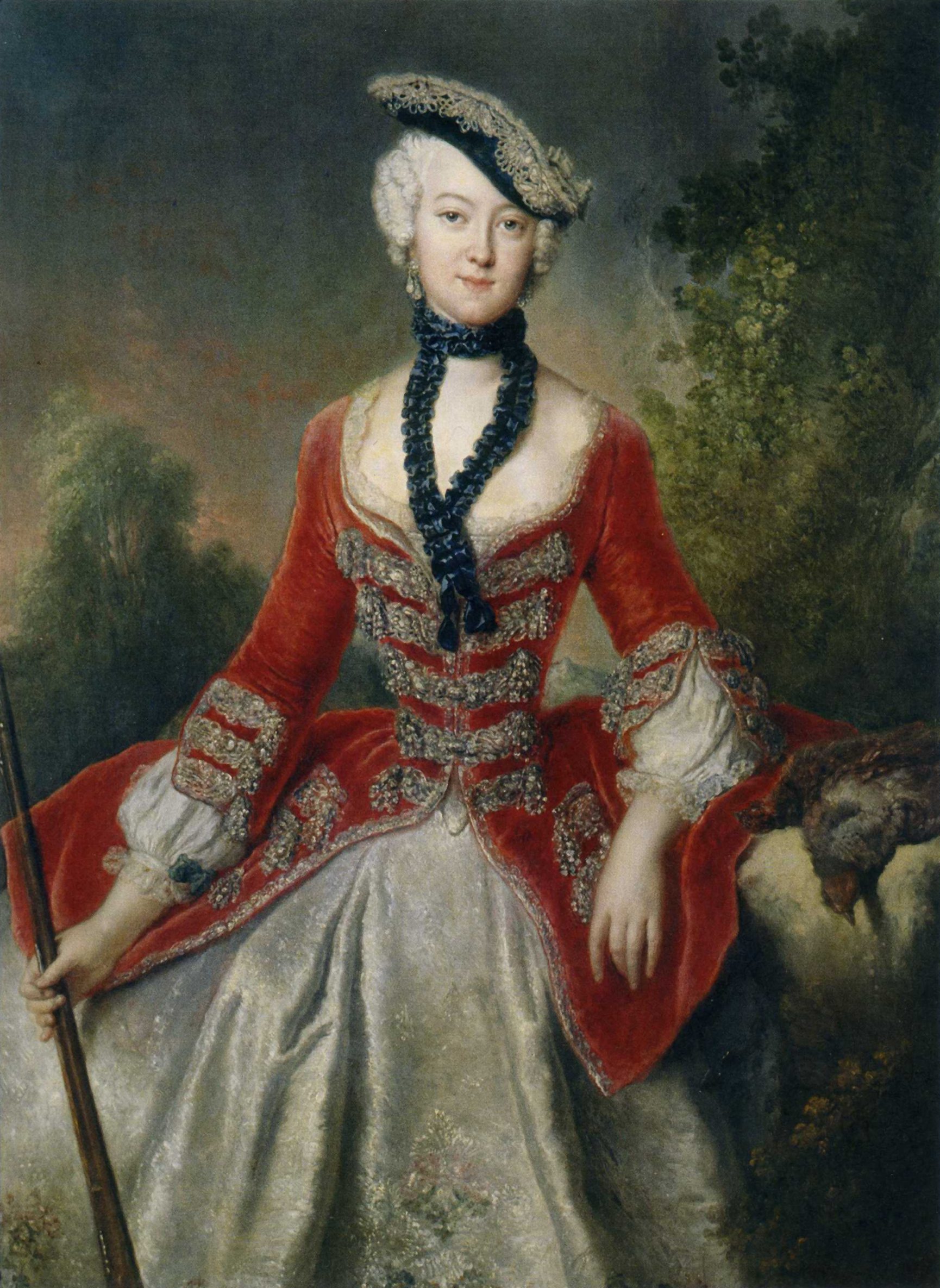
- Painted by Antoine Pesne
- Born: 11 March 1729; Mühlenbecker Land
- Died: 31 December 1814 (aged 85); Berlin
- Spouse: Count Johann Ernst von Voss (1751-1793)
- Father: Wolf Adolf von Pannwitz
- Mother: Johanna Maria Auguste von Jasmund

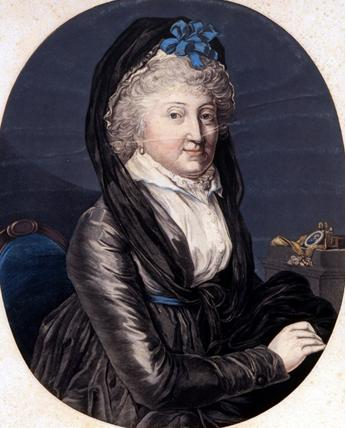
Sophie Marie von Voss

Countess Sophie Marie von Voß (11 March 1729 Schönfließ (Oberhavel) – 31 December 1814 Berlin) was a German lady in waiting and memoirist. She was the influential confidant and Oberhofmeisterin (mistress of the Robes) for many decades at the Prussian royal court. Her memoirs have also been published.

== Biography ==
Sophie Marie was the only daughter of Wolf Adolf von Pannwitz (1679–1750) and his wife, Johanna Maria Auguste von Jasmund (1702–1771). She had an older brother, Friedrich Wilhelm von Pannwitz (1719–1790), Knight Commander of the Order of Saint John.

From 1743 until 1751, she served as maid of honor to Queen Sophia Dorothea. Prince Augustus William of Prussia fell in love with her, and to discontinue what could have developed into a socially unacceptable affair, and end the difficult situation created when the prince reacted with jealous fits, she was married to her cousin, Count Johann Ernst von Voss (1726–1793), in 1751.

From 1763 until 1793, her spouse had the office of chamberlain of the household of Queen Elisabeth Christine at Schönhausen Palace, which meant that she often attended court. In 1787, the crown prince committed bigamy with the daughter of her brother-in-law, Julie von Voss.

After the death of her spouse in 1793, she temporarily retired to her estates in Mecklenburg. From 1793 until 1810, she served as mistress of the robes to the new crown princess, Louise of Mecklenburg-Strelitz. She accompanied the Prussian royal family to East Prussia during the invasion of Napoleon in 1806 to 1807. After Queen Louise's death, king Frederick William III relied upon Voß's company. With Voß's help, Prince Wilhelm zu Sayn-Wittgenstein-Hohenstein was introduced to the king's circle.

In 1811, after the death of Queen Louise, she returned to her residence in Berlin. She died in Berlin in 1814.
