= Kyritz Friary =

Monastery in Brandenburg, Germany

Coordinates: 52.945°N 12.396°E

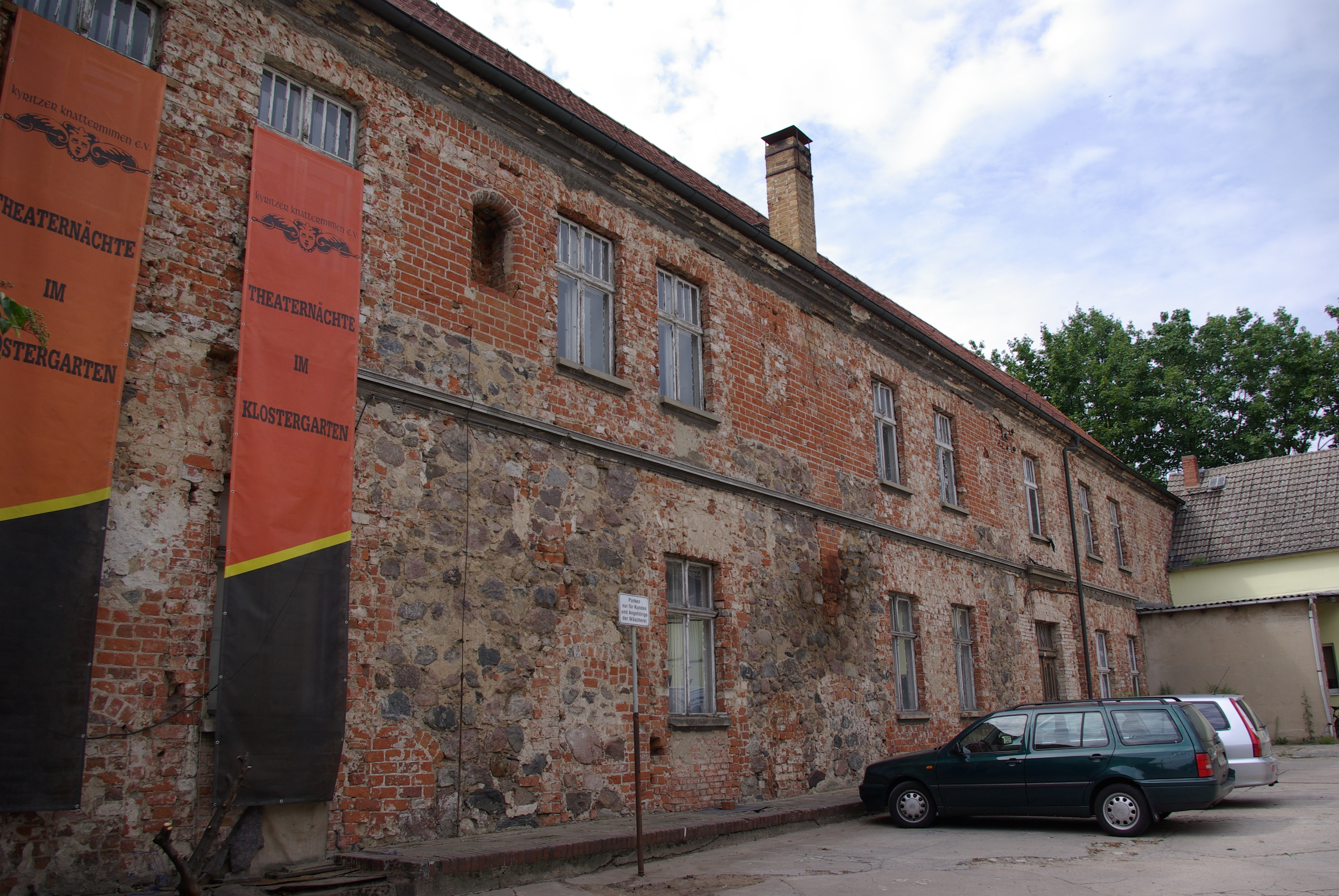
Wall of the former friary now built into 2 Johannes-Bach-Straße, Kyritz

Kyritz Friary (German: Franziskanerkloster Kyritz) is a former Franciscan friary in the old town of Kyritz in Brandenburg, Germany. Only a few walls and ruins remain, although the round-arched window and roof vaulting of the Early Gothic hall church are still discernible. According to a Bible kept in the town hall until about 1900, if not later, the friary church was built in 1225, although the surviving structural remains are of the second half of the 14th century. The first contemporary record of the friary dates from 1303.

== History ==
In 1539 the Reformation reached Kyritz, and the friary was dissolved in 1552. In the same year the friary church and the adjacent buildings passed into the possession of the town of Kyritz under the condition that it should be used for the benefit of the poor. It later passed through the hands of numerous owners. For several decades it was used as a garrison church for troops stationed here. In 1781 the remaining friary buildings, which in the meantime had become derelict, were auctioned off for demolition, including the church, the graveyard and the friary walls, which at that time were still standing. The terms of sale protected those parts of the church which still remain from destruction. On one part of the former graveyard houses and stables were built.

== Present day ==
Since 1995 the historical society "Kyritzer Knattermimen" has been restoring the friary garden. Among the ruins of the church a small stage for 300 spectators has been constructed for various events such as theatrical performances ("Theaternächte im Klostergarten"), music festivals, classical music concerts and public readings.

== Sources and external links ==
- Kyritz town homepage (in German)
