= Karl Albert von Kamptz =

German jurist

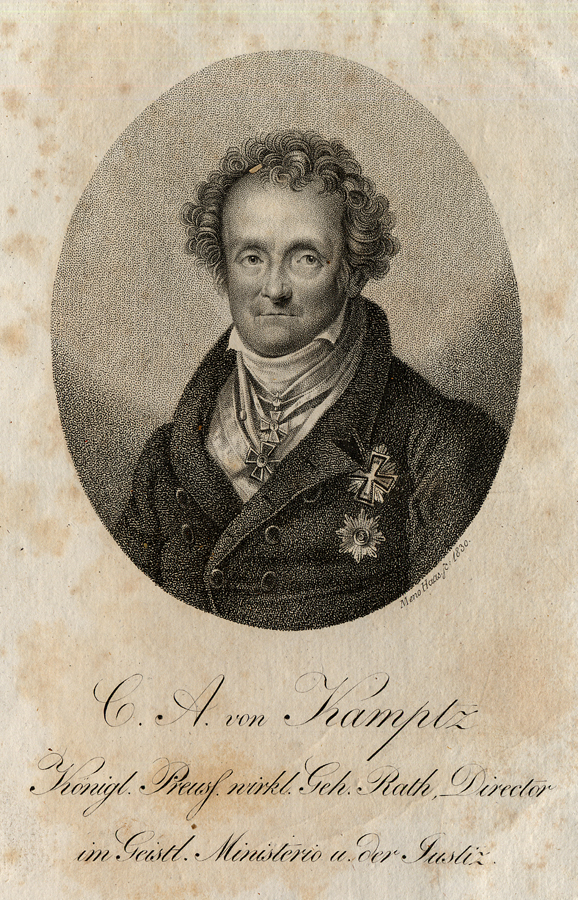
Karl Albert von Kamptz

Freiherr Karl Albert Christoph Heinrich von Kamptz (16 September 1769 in Schwerin – 3 November 1849 in Berlin) was a German jurist and Prussian Ministers of Justice from 1832 to 1842.

== Life ==
Kamptz's parents were the later Mecklenburg-Strelitz Minister Albrecht von Kamptz (1741-1816) and his wife Louise Friederike Amalie (born von Dorne). From October 1787 he studied law, first at the Friedrich University Bützow, then from 1788 to 1790 at the Georg August University of Göttingen. After preparatory service as assessor, he was appointed head of the school commission and speaker at the secret council and government in Neustrelitz. In 1794 he resigned from the civil service. On the Mecklenburg state parliament on 19 November 1798 he was elected by the knighthood to the ordinary assessor of the court and district court in Güstrow; He was appointed on 27 February 1802 by the Swedish-Pomeranian knighthood assessor at the Wismar Tribunal. On 2 September 1804, he was presented to the Prussian court, under appointment as chamberlain, to the Kurbrandenburg due Assessorat at the Imperial Chamber Court in Wetzlar. On 27 March 1805, after passing the examination, he was appointed a member of the highest court of the Old Reich - the last appointment of any member before the revocation of the Imperial Court in 1806 in the wake of the dissolution of the German Reich Constitution.

He turned down an appointment as Vice President of the Württemberg Supreme Judicial College in Stuttgart. He remained until 1809 as a pensioner in Wetzlar and participated in the settlement business of the court. This included a fierce and publicly conducted argument with the former procurator Philipp Jacob von Gülich, who had been taken over in the Mecklenburg judicial service. In 1809 he returned to Neustrelitz; the following year, as Prussian chamberlain, he led the body of Queen Luise to Prussia and in 1811 found a position there at the Berlin Court of Appeals, where he worked as a member of the Oberappellationssenats. His other career led Kamptz on the Office of the Executive Director of the Ministry of Police (1817) and First Director of the Ministry of Justice (1825) to the appointment of the Real Secret Minister of State and Justice in 1832. In addition to his post as police director in the Interior Ministry, he was also later in 1822 head of the teaching department in the Ministry of Culture. In 1829, the Academy of non-profit sciences took Erfurt Kamptz as a member and elected him in 1829 as its president. As such, Kamptz became the successor of Count Dorotheus Ludwig von Keller. In 1848 Kamptz resigned from this office. On the occasion of its 50th anniversary, the city of Berlin honored Kamptz with the award of honorary citizenship.

Throughout his life, Kamptz was very conservative, which earned him the shameful name "liberal-eaters" in the press. The writer E. T. A. Hoffmann caricatured Kamptz in his work Master Floh as "police crook Knarrpanti". Kamptz especially excelled in the pursuit of the "Jacobin" activities and the burning of books at the Wartburg Festival in 1817 in the Grand Duchy of Saxe-Weimar-Eisenach. In addition to Klemens Wenzel Lothar von Metternich, he was one of the toughest opponents and pursuers of the freedom of press issued there in 1816 under Grand Duke Carl August. Not only in the literature, but also in the contemporary liberal press Kamptz opposed strong resistance. Thus, Friedrich Förster polemicized in 1818 in the journal Nemesis as a result of the Wartburg Festival clearly against Kamptz. The stumbling block is the position paper published by Kamptz in the Yearbooks of the Prussian Legislature, "Discussion, as he calls it, 'on the public-burning of pamphlets.'" Kamptz, evidently cleared by the public burning of his Codex Gensd. In his essay, armerie "personally offended" attacks the event on the Wartburg and argues (not only legally) for the prosecution and punishment of such acts. Kamptz considers that "the theoretical masters of the state are just as harmful to the state as the political professors are to the sciences," Förster quoted him, and calling for reference to the Spanish Inquisition, "That they [burn] for all, especially faithless and shameful crimes, eg. It should be introduced, for example, for the works of public teachers and histrion (sic) Which have been employed by the state to make young citizens faithful citizens and servicemen, but do not fulfill that provision, but at an early age they are poisoned by their demagogic principles breathe! "These words clearly aimed against the political professors in Jena, specifically against the "Histrion" Luden, one of the most important "spiritus rectores" of the Jenaer Urbschenschaft. In addition to the polemical correction of Förster, "Histriones" had been actors in Rome, "who appeared in the oldest Possenspielen the Romans, Satyra and Mimus," and not, as Kamptz uses it, historians, he comments on the demand of Prussia: "He likes to build a pyre, heretical works and heretics to throw in the flames".

Nevertheless, Kamptz condemns the burning of "permitted" writings as "iniuria". Forester replies to the lawyer Kamptz: "The author seems to know neither what Iniurie, nor what crude Iniurie is, nor what Iniurien punished by official channels, otherwise he would certainly immediately instruct the Grand Ducal-Weimar court authorities of their office."

The Berlin tailoring revolution of 1830 was directed less at the King, but rather, as the historian Ilja Mieck writes, at the reactionary clique of Wittgenstein and Kamptz, for their non-compliance with the royal constitutional promises made.

On 30 December 1802 in Prützen Hedwig, he married Susanna Luzia, b. von Bulow (born 25 May 1783, died 13 August 1847), a daughter of the Droste Friedrich Christian von Bülow on Prützen, Hägerfelde, Mühlengeez and Critzow, and the Hedwig Heilwig, b. from Behr to Nustrow. The couple had four children: Hedwig Louise Friderika Albertine (1803-1868), married in his first marriage to the Pomeranian President Wilhelm von Bonin (1786-1852), in his second marriage to General Otto von Bonin (1795-1862); Friedrich Albert Carl Anton (1805-1833), Heilwig Maria Sophia Florina (1806-1807) and (Albert) Ludwig (Florus Hans) (1810-1884).

On the basis of various indications, family researchers consider it possible that Kamptz was the biological father of the prehistorian, archivist and conservator Georg Christian Friedrich Lisch. In 1838 Kamptz was elected a member of the Leopoldina.

== Bibliography ==
- Karl Albert von Kamptz, Über die Theilnahme an adlichen Klosterstellen in Deutschland besonders in Mecklenburg, Berlin: no publ., 1842
- Karl Wippermann: Kamptz, Karl Christoph Albert Heinrich v.. In: Allgemeine Deutsche Biographie (ADB). Volume 15, Duncker & Humblot, Leipzig 1882, S. 66–75.
