= Lydia Moland =

American philosophy professor

Academic background
- Education: University of Boston (BA, MA, PhD)
- Thesis: Intersubjective Norms and the Claims of Conscience: A Hegelian Ethics (2002)
- Doctoral advisor: Klaus Brinkmann (Major Professor); Juliet Floyd; David B. Wong
- Other advisors: Allen Speight, Daniel Dahlstrom, Alfredo Ferrarin

Academic work
- Era: Contemporary philosophy
- Region: Western philosophy
- School or tradition: German Idealism
- Institutions: Colby College
- Website: http://lydiamoland.com/

Lydia L. Moland is a MacArthur professor of philosophy at Colby College.

== Lydia Maria Child: A Radical American Life ==
Moland's 2022 book, Lydia Maria Child: A Radical American Life, which is a biography about the American abolitionist Lydia Maria Child was subject of critical acclaim from by different outlets such as The New York Review of Books, The Nation, The Wall Street Journal, Los Angeles Review of Books and many others. Cornel West and the Pulitzer Prize winning author Megan Marshall also praised the book.

== Selected publications ==
=== Monographs ===
- "Lydia Maria Child: A Radical American Life", Lydia Maria Child, University of Chicago Press, 2022-10-07, doi:10.7208/chicago/9780226715858/html, ISBN 978-0-226-71585-8
- Hegel's Aesthetics. Oxford University PressNew York. 2019-08-22. doi:10.1093/oso/9780190847326.001.0001. ISBN 0-19-084732-8.
- Hegel on Political Identity: Patriotism, Nationality, Cosmopolitanism. Northwestern University Press. 2011. doi:10.2307/j.ctv47w4jj. ISBN 978-0-8101-2741-8.

=== Editorials ===
- Moland, Lydia; Stone, Alison, eds. (2023-07-18). The Oxford Handbook of American and British Women Philosophers in the Nineteenth Century. Oxford University Press. doi:10.1093/oxfordhb/9780197558898.001.0001. ISBN 978-0-19-755889-8.
