= Westermann Verlag =

German publishing firm

- Parent company: Medien-Union
- Founded: 1838
- Founder: George Westermann (1810–1879)
- Country of origin: Germany
- Headquarters location: Braunschweig
- Publication types: books
- No. of employees: 800
- Official website: www.westermann.de

Westermann Verlag (English: "Westermann Publishing") is a German publishing firm, founded in the 19th century in Braunschweig, Duchy of Brunswick by George Westermann (23 February 1810 in Leipzig; 7 September 1879 in Wiesbaden). Several other generations of the Westermann family succeeded him. In 1986, the "Westermann Druck- und Verlagsgruppe" in Braunschweig, comprising numerous branches, became part of Medien-Union based in Ludwigshafen, employing 800.

Westermann is renowned for its meticulous world history-atlas in German, the Großer Atlas zur Weltgeschichte, generally known as "the Westermann."

For use in schools, they continue to publish the Carl Diercke Schul-Atlas, a series started in the 19th century, since called Diercke Weltatlas. They also offer products related to or using Google Earth, 3D-technology, and globes.

== Divisions ==
- Westermann Schulbuchverlag (Braunschweig)
- Georg Westermann Verlag (Braunschweig)
- Westermann Lernspielverlag GmbH (Braunschweig)
- Westermann Wien im Verlag E. Dorner GmbH (Vienna, Austria)
- Pauz-Westermann Könyvkiadó Kft. (Celldömölk, Hungary)
- Westermann Druck GmbH (Braunschweig)
- Westermann Druck Zwickau GmbH (Zwickau)
- Arena Verlag GmbH (Würzburg)
- Schroedel Verlag (Braunschweig)
- Verlag Moritz Diesterweg (Braunschweig)
- Verlag Ferdinand Schöningh (Braunschweig)
- Verlag Jugend & Volk
- Winklers Verlag (Darmstadt)
- VSB-Verlagsservice Braunschweig GmbH (Braunschweig)
- Westermann Berufliche Bildung

== See also ==
- Books in Germany
