= Heinrich Gustav Hotho =

German art historian (1802–1873)

Heinrich Gustav Hotho (Berlin, May 22, 1802 – Berlin, December 25, 1873) was a German historian of art and Right Hegelian. He is famous for being the compiler and editor of Hegel's posthumous work Vorlesungen über die Ästhetik ("Lectures on Aesthetics").

== Biography ==
During boyhood he was affected for two years with blindness consequent on an attack of measles. But recovering his sight he studied so hard as to take his degree at Berlin in 1826. A year of travel spent in visiting Paris, London and the Low Countries determined his vocation.

He came home delighted with the treasures which he had seen, worked laboriously for a higher examination and passed as "docent" in aesthetics and art history. In 1829 he was made professor at the university of Berlin. In 1833 GF Waagen accepted him as assistant in the museum of the Prussian capital; and in 1858 he was promoted to the directorship of the Berlin print-room.

During a long and busy life, in which his time was divided between literature and official duties, Hotho's ambition had always been to master the history of the schools of Germany and the Netherlands. Accordingly what he published was generally confined to those countries. In 1842-1843 he gave to the world his account of German and Flemish painting. From 1853 to 1858 he revised and published anew a part of this work, which he called "The school of Hubert van Eyck, with his German precursors and contemporaries."

His attempt later on to write a history of Christian painting overtasked his strength, and remained unfinished. Hotho is important in the history of aesthetics as having developed Hegel's theories; but he was deficient in knowledge of Italian painting.
