= Friedrich Wilhelm Carové =

German philosopher and publicist (1789–1852)

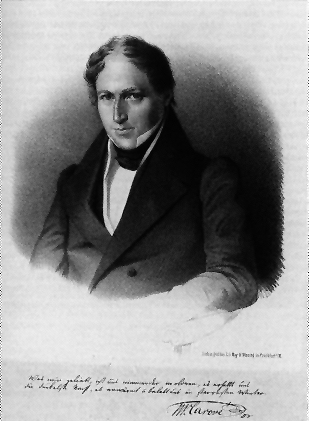
- Born: 20 June 1789; Koblenz, Electorate of Trier
- Died: 18 March 1852 (aged 62); Heidelberg, Grand Duchy of Baden

Academic background
- Education: Koblenz Law School (Lic., 1809); Heidelberg University (PhD, 1818)
- Doctoral advisor: G. W. F. Hegel

Academic work
- Institutions: Heidelberg University; University of Breslau

Friedrich Wilhelm Carové (June 20, 1789 – March 18, 1852) was a German philosopher and publicist.

== Biography ==
He was a lawyer, held some judicial offices, was made doctor of philosophy by the University of Heidelberg, and officiated for a short time as professor at Breslau. He was one of the founders of the Heidelberg Burschenschaft, and participated in the famous Wartburg festival. He was afterward a member of the provisional German parliament (German: Frankfurter Vorparlament) of 1848.

Carové was a pupil of Hegel's between 1816 and 1818 and was chosen by Hegel as the first interpreter of his thought. They were in friendly terms for all their life. Due to his publication of a booklet on the Sand Affair in 1819, he was investigated by the police and arrested, thus excluded from the post in Berlin University. He was harassed and put under surveillance by Prince Sayn-Wittgenstein and his reactionary circles in the Prussian court. Carové's career was thus destroyed despite Hegel's best efforts to help him.

In 2022 over 4000 pages of his notes and transcriptions of Hegel's lectures were found by Klaus Vieweg in the library of Roman Catholic Archdiocese of Munich and Freising. The manuscripts were believed to be a gift sent by Carové to Karl Joseph Hieronymus Windischmann, a friend of Hegel's, as a gift.

== Works ==
His most elaborate works are attacks on the Roman Catholic religion, and include:

- Ueber die alleinseligmachende Kirche (2 vols., Frankfurt, 1826)
- Was heisst römisch-katholische Kirche? (2d ed., Altenburg, 1847)
- Die Buchdruckerkunst in ihrer weltgeschichtlichen Bedeutung (Siegen, 1843)
- Ueber das sogenannte germanische und sogenannte christliche Staatsprincip (1843)
