= Klaus Brinkmann =

American philosopher

- Born: 1944
- Died: 2016 (aged 71–72)

Academic background
- Education: University of Tübingen (PhD)
- Thesis: Aristoteles' allgemeine und spezielle Metaphysik (1979)

Academic work
- Era: Contemporary philosophy
- Region: Western philosophy
- School or tradition: German Idealism
- Institutions: Boston University
- Website: https://www.kreines.net/

Klaus Brinkmann (1944-2016) was a professor of philosophy at Boston University.

== Life and works ==
Brinkman received his PhD from the University of Tübingen in 1979 with the dissertation on "Aristoteles' allgemeine und spezielle Metaphysik", subsequently he was a lecturer in philosophy at the University of Bonn from 1979 to 1982 and again from 1984 to 1988. Between these periods, he held the position of Assistant Professor of Philosophy at Boston University from 1982 to 1983. He later took on the same role at the University of Tübingen, where he served from 1984 to 1989. In 1990, he returned to Boston University, this time as an Associate Professor of Philosophy.

=== Publications ===
==== Monographs ====
- Idealism Without Limits. Philosophical Studies in Contemporary Culture. Vol. 18. 2011. doi:10.1007/978-90-481-3622-3. ISBN 978-90-481-3621-6.
- German Idealism: Critical Concepts in Philosophy. Routledge. 2007. ISBN 978-0-415-34417-3.
- Aristoteles' allgemeine und spezielle Metaphysik. 1979. doi:10.1515/9783110862140. ISBN 978-3-11-007578-6.

==== Translations ====
- Hegel, Georg Wilhelm Fredrich (2010). Brinkmann, Klaus; Dahlstrom, Daniel O. (eds.). Georg Wilhelm Friedrich Hegel: Encyclopedia of the Philosophical Sciences in Basic Outline. doi:10.1017/9780511780226. ISBN 978-0-511-78022-6.
