= Friedrich Vieweg =

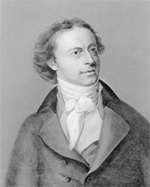
- Born: 11 March 1761; Halle an der Saale
- Died: 25 December 1835 (aged 74); Braunschweig
- Occupation: Publisher

Johann Friedrich Vieweg (German: [ˈfiːveːk]; 11 March 1761 – 25 December 1835) was a German publisher and the founder of Vieweg Verlag.

== Early life ==
He was the son of master tailor Johann Valentin Vieweg (d. 1785), who later owned a starch factory. After cancelling an apprenticeship in Magdeburg, a chance acquaintance with Friedrich Nicolai led him to become a bookseller in the Halle Orphanage bookstore. His experience there led to a position as an assistant at the Bohn Bookstore in Hamburg. It was there he met the publisher Joachim Heinrich Campe and his daughter Charlotte, who would become Vieweg's wife.

In 1784, he moved to Berlin to look after the Mylius Bookstore, whose owner was ill. After the owner's death in 1786, Vieweg founded his own publishing business. His first success was an edition of Goethe's lyrical epic Hermann and Dorothea. In October 1795, he married Charlotte Campe.

== Work in Braunschweig ==
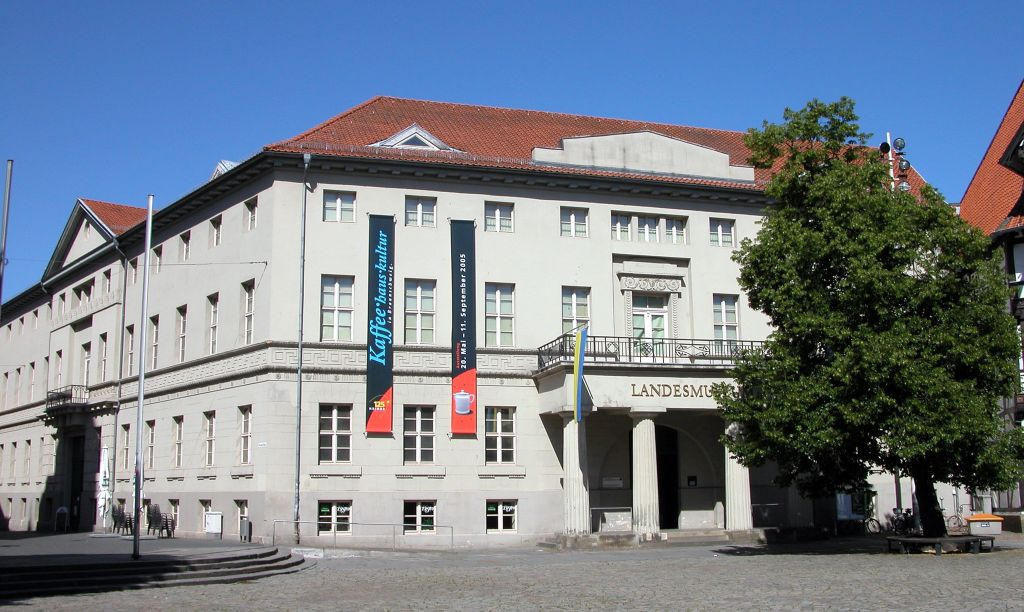
The restored Vieweg-Haus, now home to the Braunschweigische Landesmuseum

Duke Karl Wilhelm Ferdinand wanted to establish a book fair and make Braunschweig the center of the German bookselling trade. At the Duke's request, Vieweg moved there in 1799 and was presented with some land and a dilapidated theater where he could set up his operations.

After the expulsion of the Duke by the Napoleonic Army, Vieweg came under suspicion because of his close association with him. As a result, he turned away from publishing to operate a type foundry and a playing card factory.

When sovereignty was restored in 1815, he became involved in politics and public works administration, serving for some time as a city councillor. In 1824, a planned patriotic weekly called the Braunschweigische Hauschronik failed to materialize. From 1826 to 1828, he produced the Mitternachtblatt für gebildete Stände (Evening Journal for Educated Readers) in cooperation with Adolf Müllner but, due to some disagreements, it was sold to Niedmann's Verlag in Wolfenbüttel.

Upon his death in 1835, his publishing company passed to his eldest son, Eduard Vieweg. In 1837, his younger son Friedrich Vieweg Jr. (1808–1888), founded his own publishing company in Paris, and one of his daughters, Blanca, married the publisher Georg Westermann.
