= Eduard Vieweg =

German publisher (1797–1869)

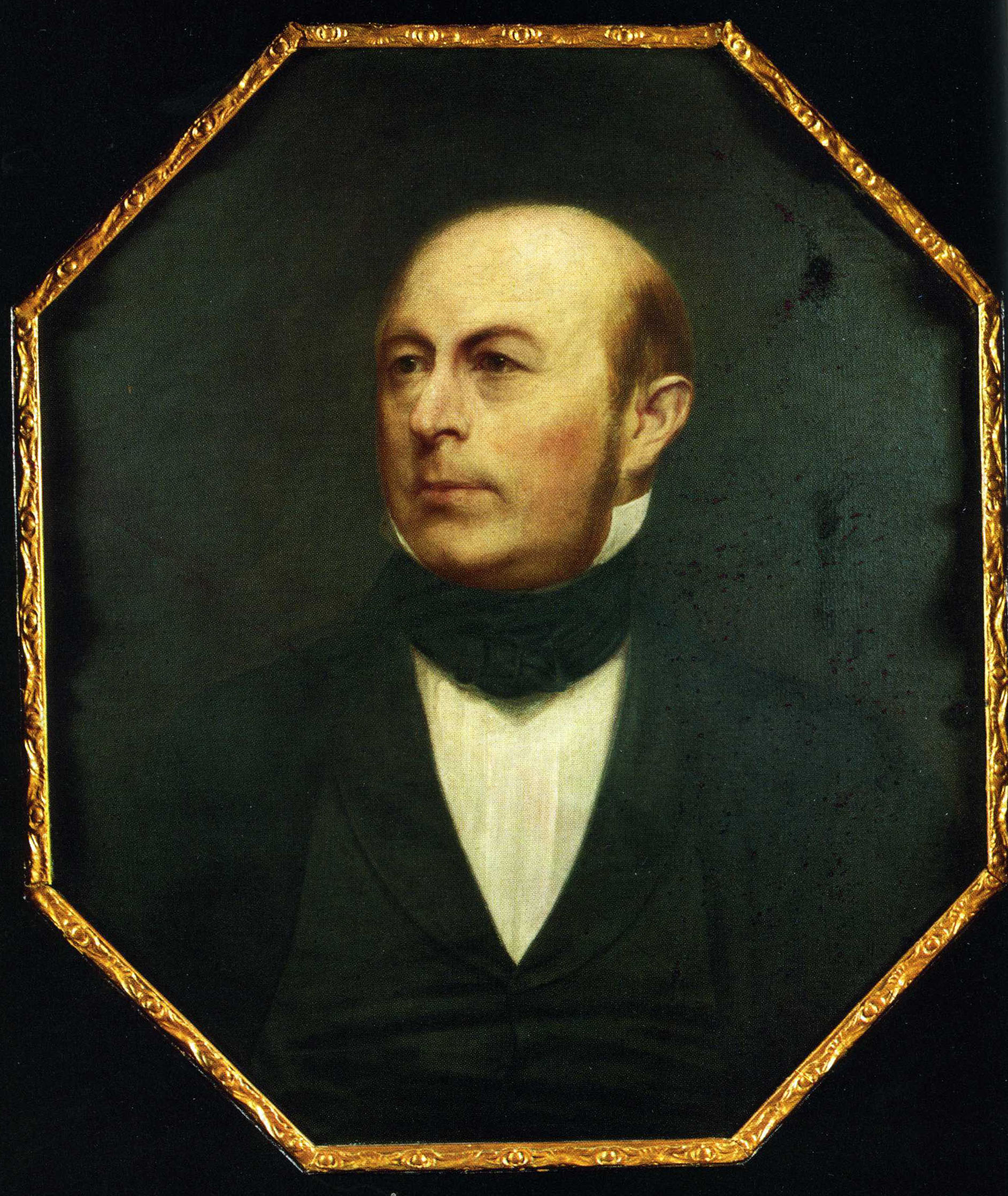
Eduard Vieweg (date and artist unknown)

Hans Heinrich Eduard Vieweg (15 July 1797, Berlin - 1 December 1869, Braunschweig) was a German publisher; the owner of Vieweg Verlag.

== Biography ==
He was born to the publisher and bookseller, Friedrich Vieweg. When his family moved to Braunschweig, in 1799, he came under the influence of his grandfather, the educator and publisher, Joachim Heinrich Campe. He attended grammar school there, but joined the Hussar regiment in 1813, and was promoted to Sergeant the following year. After participating in several campaigns, he was placed on leave with a foot ailment, possibly caused by poor riding habits, and was discharged in 1815.

After some initial training at his father's company, from 1821 to 1823 he worked for Hoffmann und Campe, operated by his uncle, Julius Campe in Hamburg. After that, he visited England and France where, in Paris, he befriended the chemist, and his future business partner, Justus von Liebig. In 1825, he married a distant cousin, Luise Campe; daughter of the Leipzig financier, Heinrich Wilhelm Campe (1771-1862).

That same year, he became a partner in his father's publishing house, bringing in the latest presses and equipment, which he had discovered while traveling. He also made and patented several improvements. With his brother Karl, a farmer, he founded his own paper company. Most of the works he chose to publish were of a scientific nature. He became the owner of the firm when his father died in 1835.

Politically, he was a moderate Liberal; supporting the idea of a unified Germany, under the leadership of Prussia. To this end, from 1831, he published a newspaper, the Deutsche Nationalzeitung aus Braunschweig und Hannover, edited by Karl Heinrich Hermes. It was issued until 1840, when the increasing censorship forced him to discontinue it. In 1848, he made another attempt with a similar newspaper, the Deutsche Reichs-Zeitung, edited by Karl Andree. This lasted until 1866, when Prussia annexed Schleswig-Holstein after the Seven Weeks' War, and Vieweg found his support for Prussia waning.

He was also involved in local politics; serving on the city council (1839–1855) and in the Landtag (1848–1867). In 1852, he participated in creating the Braunschweigische Bank, and served on its board of directors until 1861.

In October 1866, he suffered a stroke and remained bedridden until his death in 1869. Vieweg Verlag passed to his only son, Heinrich Vieweg.
