= Georg Wilhelm Friedrich Hegel =

German philosopher (1770–1831)

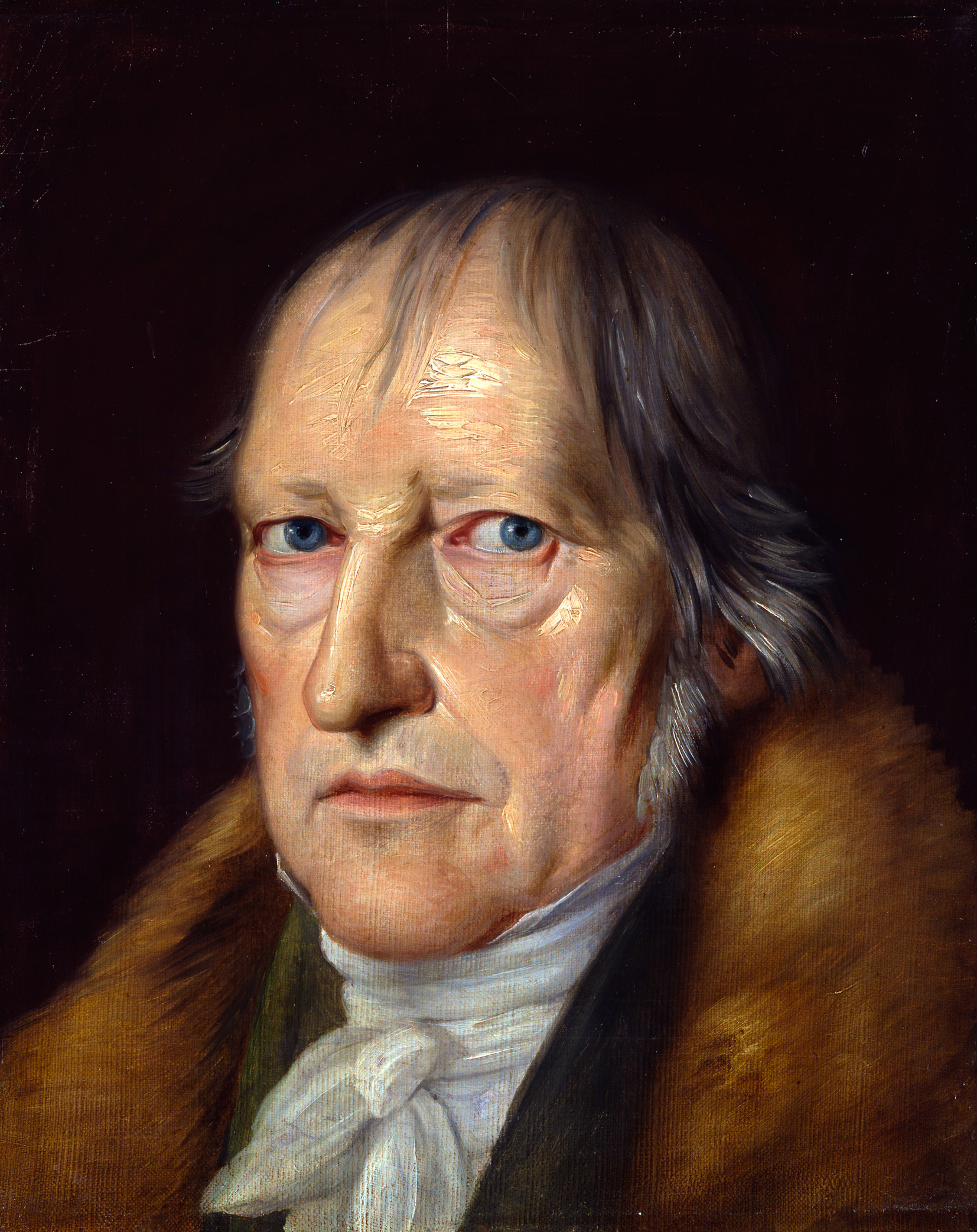
- 1831 portrait
- Born: 27 August 1770; Stuttgart, Württemberg
- Died: 14 November 1831 (aged 61); Berlin, Prussia
- Spouse: Marie Helena Susanna von Tucher (m. 1811)
- Children: 4, including Immanuel and Karl

Education
- Education: Tübinger Stift (MA, 1790; Lic., 1793); University of Jena (Dr. phil. hab., 1801)
- Academic advisors: I. C. Diez; J. F. Flatt; Friedrich Schlegel; G. C. Storr

Philosophical work
- Era: 19th-century philosophy
- Region: Western philosophy
- School: Absolute idealism; German idealism
- Institutions: Jena (1801–1806); Heidelberg (1816–1818); Berlin (1818–1831)
- Doctoral students: F. W. Carové; K. L. Michelet
- Notable students: See list: Bruno Bauer; J. E. Erdmann; Ludwig Feuerbach; Eduard Gans; Karl Rosenkranz; Max Stirner; F. A. Trendelenburg
- Main interests: History of philosophy; Metaphysics; Philosophy of art; Philosophy of history; Political philosophy; Philosophy of religion
- Notable works: See list: Phenomenology of Spirit; Science of Logic; Encyclopaedia of the Philosophical Sciences in Basic Outline; Elements of the Philosophy of Right
- Notable ideas: See list: Cunning of reason; Geist (spirit); Hegelian dialectic; End of history; Lord–bondsman dialectic; Sublation; Sittlichkeit (ethical life); Weltgeist

Georg Wilhelm Friedrich Hegel (Note: Pronounced /ˈheɪɡəl/; German: [ˈɡeːɔɐk ˈvɪlhɛlm ˈfʁiːdʁɪç ˈheːɡl̩].) (27 August 1770 – 14 November 1831) was a German philosopher and a major figure in the tradition of German idealism. His influence on Western philosophy extends across a wide range of topics—from metaphysical issues in epistemology and ontology, to political philosophy, to philosophy of art and philosophy of religion.

Hegel was born in Stuttgart. His life spanned the transitional period between the Enlightenment and the Romantic movement. His thought was shaped by the French Revolution and the Napoleonic Wars, events which he interpreted from a philosophical perspective. His academic career culminated in his appointment to the chair of philosophy at the University of Berlin, where he remained a prominent intellectual figure until his death.

Throughout his work, Hegel strove to correct what he argued were untenable dualisms common in modern philosophy. His principal achievement was the development of a comprehensive philosophical system, often termed absolute idealism, to account for reality as a unified whole. Central to this system is the concept of "spirit" (Geist), which Hegel presented as humankind coming to know itself through a historical process of rational development. Hegel's characteristic procedure, often termed dialectical or speculative, assesses concepts and forms of consciousness according to their own internal criteria, revealing their contradictions and one-sidedness. This leads to their resolution in a higher, more comprehensive unity, which both cancels and preserves the initial stage. His major works, including the Phenomenology of Spirit (1807) and the Science of Logic (1812–1816), detail this systematic vision. In his political philosophy, he famously asserted that "world history is progress in the consciousness of freedom".

Hegel's influence has been profound and divisive. After his death, his followers split into rival "Right" and "Left" Hegelian camps. The Left, including Ludwig Feuerbach and Karl Marx, adapted his dialectical method for their materialist critiques of religion and society. In the twentieth century, his thought was further developed in traditions such as French Hegelianism and critical theory, and became a major point of reference for existentialism.

== Life ==
=== Formative years ===
==== Stuttgart, Tübingen, Berne, Frankfurt (1770–1800) ====
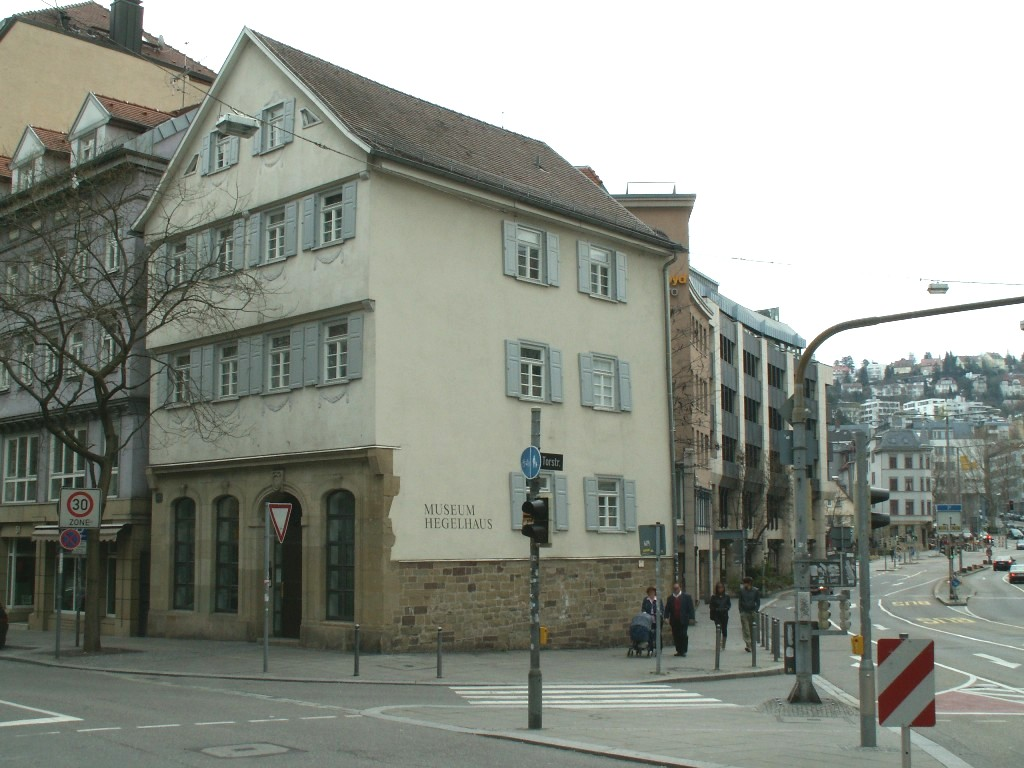
The birthplace of Hegel in Stuttgart, which now houses the Hegel Museum

Hegel was born on 27 August 1770 in Stuttgart, capital of the Duchy of Württemberg in the Holy Roman Empire (now southwestern Germany). Christened Georg Wilhelm Friedrich, he was known as Wilhelm to his close family. His father, Georg Ludwig Hegel, was secretary to the revenue office at the court of Karl Eugen, Duke of Württemberg. Hegel's mother, Maria Magdalena Louisa Hegel, née Fromm, was the daughter of a lawyer at the High Court of Justice at the Württemberg court Ludwig Albrecht Fromm. She died of bilious fever when Hegel was thirteen. Hegel and his father also caught the disease but narrowly survived. Hegel had a sister, Christiane Luise; and a brother, Georg Ludwig, who perished as an officer during Napoleon's 1812 Russian campaign. At the age of three, Hegel went to the German School. When he entered the Latin School two years later, he already knew the first declension, having been taught it by his mother. In 1776, he entered Stuttgart's Eberhard-Ludwigs-Gymnasium and during his adolescence read voraciously, copying lengthy extracts in his diary. Authors he read include the poet Friedrich Gottlieb Klopstock and writers associated with the Enlightenment, such as Christian Garve and Gotthold Ephraim Lessing. Hegel's first biographer, Karl Rosenkranz, described in 1844 the young Hegel's education there by saying that it "belonged entirely to the Enlightenment with respect to principle, and entirely to classical antiquity with respect to curriculum." His studies at the Gymnasium concluded with his graduation speech, "The abortive state of art and scholarship in Turkey."

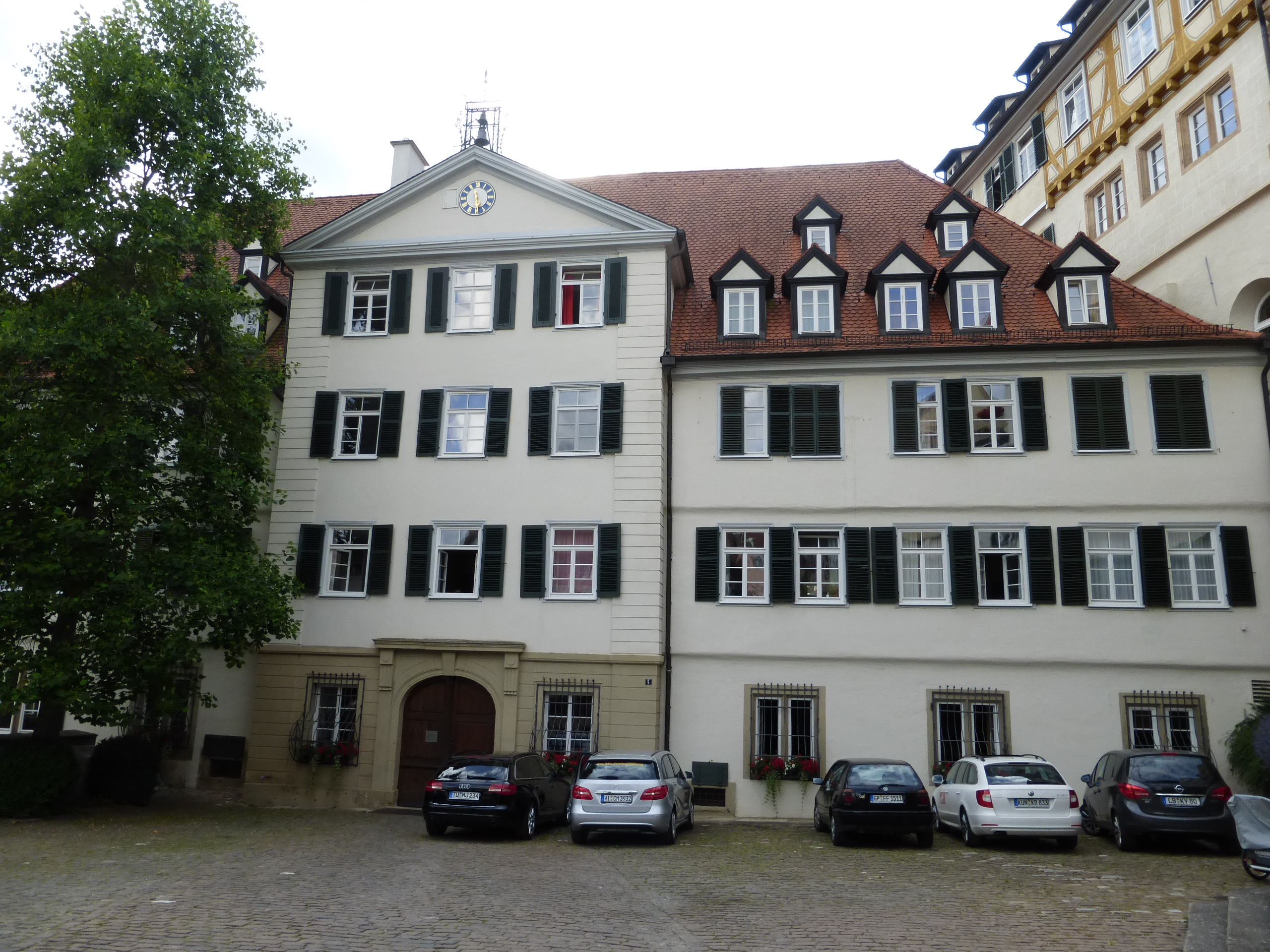
Hegel, Schelling, and Hölderlin are believed to have shared the room on the second floor above the entrance doorway while studying at this institute (a Protestant seminary called "the Tübinger Stift").

At the age of eighteen, Hegel entered the Tübinger Stift, a Protestant seminary attached to the University of Tübingen, where he had as roommates the poet and philosopher Friedrich Hölderlin and the future philosopher Friedrich Schelling. Sharing a dislike for what they regarded as the restrictive environment of the Seminary, the three became close friends and mutually influenced each other's ideas. (It is mostly likely that Hegel attended the Stift because it was state-funded, for he had "a profound distaste for the study of orthodox theology" and never wanted to become a minister.) All three greatly admired Hellenic civilization, and Hegel additionally steeped himself in Jean-Jacques Rousseau and Lessing during this time. They watched the unfolding of the French Revolution with shared enthusiasm. Although the violence of the 1793 Reign of Terror dampened Hegel's hopes, he continued to identify with the moderate Girondin faction and never lost his commitment to the principles of 1789, which he expressed by drinking a toast to the storming of the Bastille every fourteenth of July. Schelling and Hölderlin immersed themselves in theoretical debates on Kantian philosophy, from which Hegel remained aloof. Hegel, at this time, envisaged his future as that of a Popularphilosoph (a "man of letters") who serves to make the abstruse ideas of philosophers accessible to a wider public; his own felt need to engage critically with the central ideas of Kantianism would not come until 1800.

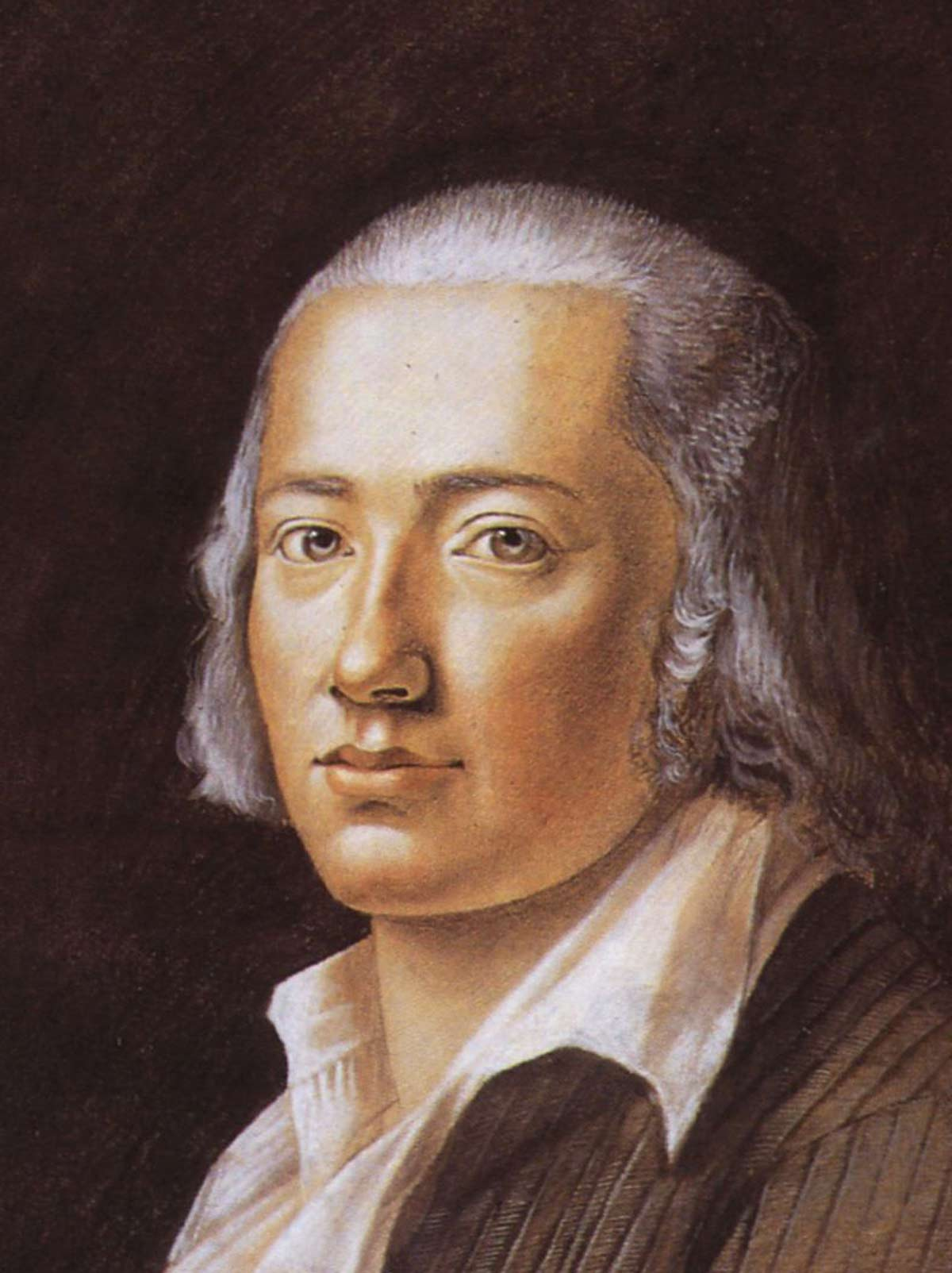
The poet Friedrich Hölderlin was one of Hegel's closest friends and roommates at Tübinger Stift.

After completing his theological studies at the Tübingen Seminary, Hegel became Hofmeister (house tutor) from 1793 to 1796 to the family of Captain Karl Friedrich von Steiger, a member of the Bernese patriciate. He spent the summers at the Steigers' estate at Tschugg, near Erlach, where he had the use of the family's extensive library. There he read widely in political philosophy and political economy—including Montesquieu's The Spirit of the Laws, as well as Grotius, Hobbes, Hume, Locke, Machiavelli, Rousseau, Spinoza, Thucydides, and Voltaire—laying a foundation for his later social and political thought. During this period, he composed the text which has become known as the Life of Jesus and a book-length manuscript titled "The Positivity of the Christian Religion." His relations with his employers becoming strained, Hegel accepted an offer mediated by Hölderlin to take up a similar position with a wine merchant's family in Frankfurt in 1797. There, Hölderlin exerted an important influence on Hegel's thought. In Berne, Hegel's writings had been sharply critical of orthodox Christianity, but in Frankfurt, under the influence of early Romanticism, he underwent a sort of reversal, exploring, in particular, the mystical experience of love as the true essence of religion. Also in 1797, the unpublished and unsigned manuscript of "The Oldest Systematic Program of German Idealism" was written. It was written in Hegel's hand, but may have been authored by Hegel, Schelling, or Hölderlin. While in Frankfurt, Hegel composed the essay "Fragments on Religion and Love." In 1799, he wrote another essay titled "The Spirit of Christianity and Its Fate", unpublished during his lifetime.

=== Career years ===
==== Jena, Bamberg, Nuremberg (1801–1816) ====
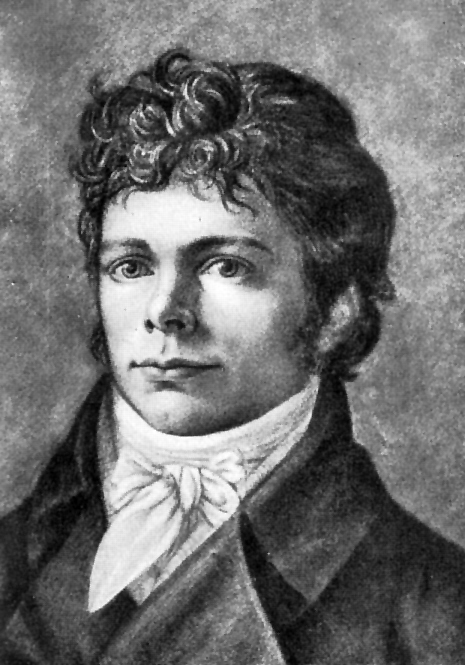
While at Jena, Hegel helped found a philosophical journal with his friend from Seminary, the young philosophical prodigy Friedrich Wilhelm Joseph Schelling.

In 1801, Hegel came to Jena at the encouragement of Schelling, who held the position of Extraordinary Professor at the University of Jena. Hegel secured a position at the University of Jena as a Privatdozent (unsalaried lecturer) after submitting the inaugural dissertation De Orbitis Planetarum, in which he briefly criticized mathematical arguments that assert that there must exist a planet between Mars and Jupiter. (Note: Unbeknownst to Hegel, Giuseppe Piazzi had discovered the minor planet Ceres within that orbit on 1 January 1801.) Later in the year, Hegel's essay The Difference Between Fichte's and Schelling's System of Philosophy was completed. He lectured on "Logic and Metaphysics" and gave lectures with Schelling on an "Introduction to the Idea and Limits of True Philosophy" and facilitated a "philosophical disputorium." In 1802, Schelling and Hegel founded the journal Kritische Journal der Philosophie (Critical Journal of Philosophy) to which they contributed until the collaboration ended when Schelling left for Würzburg in 1803. In 1805, the university promoted Hegel to the unsalaried position of extraordinary professor after he wrote a letter to the poet and minister of culture Johann Wolfgang von Goethe protesting the promotion of his philosophical adversary Jakob Friedrich Fries ahead of him. Hegel attempted to enlist the help of the poet and translator Johann Heinrich Voß to obtain a post at the renascent University of Heidelberg, but he failed. To his chagrin, Fries was, in the same year, made ordinary professor (salaried). The following February marked the birth of Hegel's illegitimate son, Georg Ludwig Friedrich Fischer (1807–1831), as the result of an affair with Hegel's landlady Christiana Charlotte Johanna Burkhardt (née Fischer). With his finances drying up quickly, Hegel was under great pressure to deliver his book, the long-promised introduction to his philosophical system. Hegel was putting the finishing touches to it, The Phenomenology of Spirit, as Napoleon engaged Prussian troops on 14 October 1806 in the Battle of Jena on a plateau outside the city. On the day before the battle, Napoleon entered the city of Jena. Hegel recounted his impressions in a letter to his friend Friedrich Immanuel Niethammer:

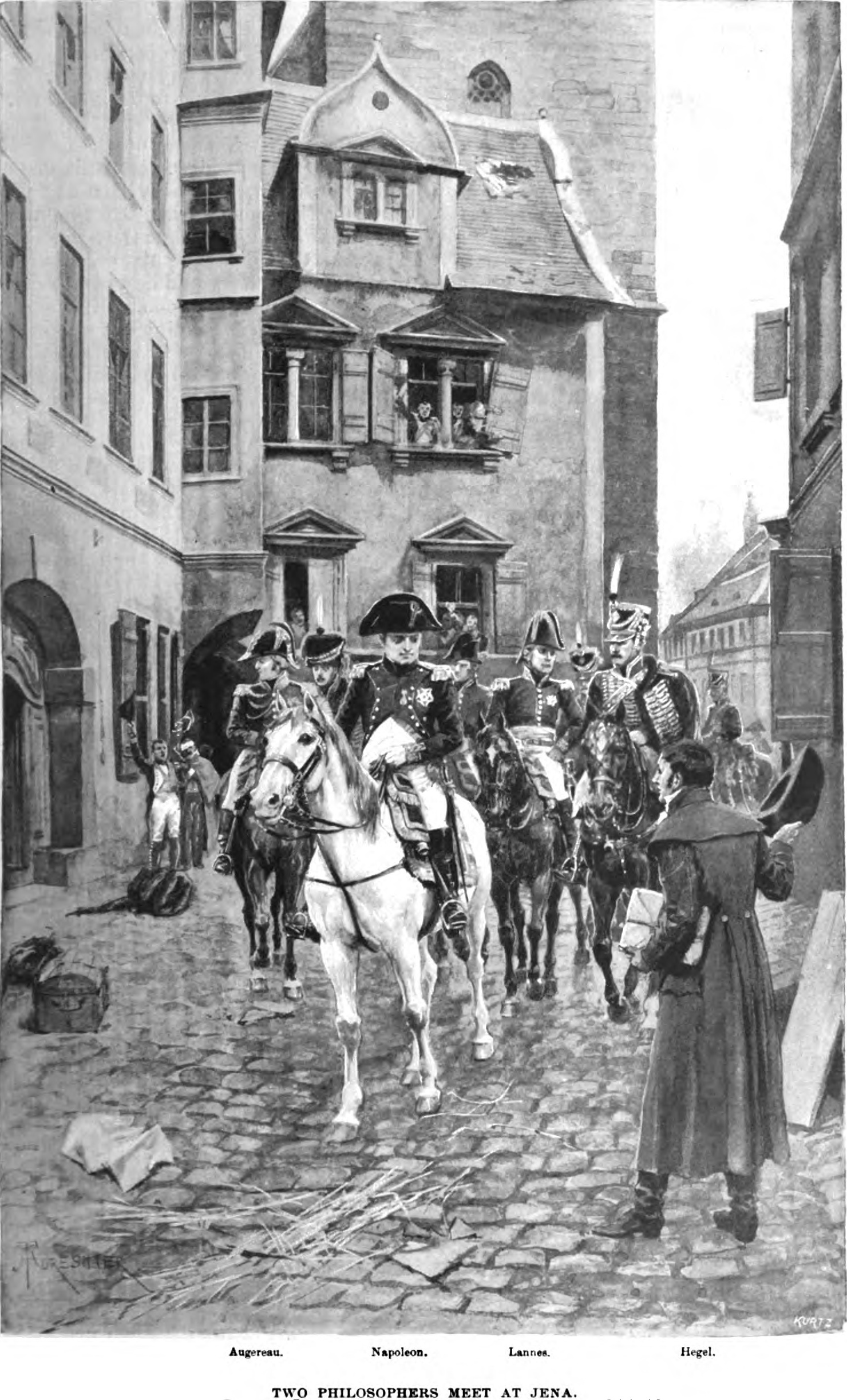
"Hegel and Napoleon in Jena" (illustration from Harper's Magazine, 1895), an imaginary meeting that became proverbial due to Hegel's notable use of Weltseele ("world-soul") in reference to Napoleon ("the world-soul on horseback", die Weltseele zu Pferde)

I saw the Emperor – this world-soul [Weltseele] – riding out of the city on reconnaissance. It is indeed a wonderful sensation to see such an individual, who, concentrated here at a single point, astride a horse, reaches out over the world and masters it.

Hegel biographer Terry Pinkard notes that Hegel's comment to Niethammer "is all the more striking since he had already composed the crucial section of the Phenomenology in which he remarked that the Revolution had now officially passed to another land (Germany) that would complete 'in thought' what the Revolution had only partially accomplished in practice." Although Napoleon had spared the University of Jena from much of the destruction of the surrounding city, few students returned after the battle and enrollment suffered, making Hegel's financial prospects even worse. Hegel traveled in the winter to Bamberg and stayed with Niethammer to oversee the proofs of the Phenomenology, which was being printed there. Although Hegel tried to obtain another professorship, even writing Goethe in an attempt to help secure a permanent position replacing a professor of botany, he was unable to find a permanent position. In 1807, he had to move to Bamberg since his savings and the payment from the Phenomenology were exhausted and he needed money to support his illegitimate son Ludwig. There, he became the editor of the local newspaper, Bamberger Zeitung, a position he obtained with the help of Niethammer. Ludwig Fischer and his mother stayed behind in Jena.

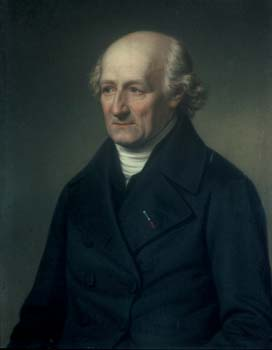
Hegel's friend Friedrich Immanuel Niethammer financially supported Hegel and used his political influence to help him obtain multiple positions.

In Bamberg, as editor of the Bamberger Zeitung, which was a pro-French newspaper, Hegel extolled the virtues of Napoleon and often editorialized the Prussian accounts of the war. Being the editor of a local newspaper, Hegel also became an important person in Bamberg social life, often visiting with the local official Johann Heinrich Liebeskind, and becoming involved in local gossip and pursuing his passions for cards, fine eating, and the local Bamberg beer. However, Hegel bore contempt for what he saw as "old Bavaria", frequently referring to it as "Barbaria" and dreaded that "hometowns" like Bamberg would lose their autonomy under the new Bavarian state. After being investigated in September 1808 by the Bavarian state for potentially violating security measures by publishing French troop movements, Hegel wrote to Niethammer, now a high official in Munich, pleading for Niethammer's help in securing a teaching position. With the help of Niethammer, Hegel was appointed headmaster of a gymnasium in Nuremberg in November 1808, a post he held until 1816. While in Nuremberg, Hegel adapted his recently published Phenomenology of Spirit for use in the classroom. Part of his remit was to teach a class called "Introduction to Knowledge of the Universal Coherence of the Sciences." As headmaster, he also taught philosophy, German, Greek, and higher mathematics, dictating his lessons in numbered paragraphs and devoting much of the class time to students' questions and his replies. The philosophical material he developed for these classes was later compiled from students' notebooks by Karl Rosenkranz and published as the Philosophische Propädeutik. In 1811, Hegel married Marie Helena Susanna von Tucher (1791–1855), the eldest daughter of a Nuremberg senator. Their first child, a daughter named Susanna Maria Louisa Wilhelmine, was born on 27 June 1812 and died six weeks later, on 8 August. This period also saw the publication of his second major work, the Science of Logic (Wissenschaft der Logik; 3 vols., 1812, 1813 and 1816), and the birth of two sons, Friedrich Wilhelm Karl (1813–1901) and Thomas Immanuel Christian (1814–1891).

==== Heidelberg, Berlin (1816–1831) ====
Having received offers of a post from the Universities of Erlangen, Berlin and Heidelberg, Hegel chose Heidelberg, where he moved in 1816. Soon after, his illegitimate son Ludwig Fischer (now ten years old) joined the Hegel household in April 1817, having spent time in an orphanage after the death of his mother, Christiana Burkhardt. In 1817, Hegel published Encyclopaedia of the Philosophical Sciences in Basic Outline as a summary of his philosophy for students attending his lectures at Heidelberg. It is also while in Heidelberg that Hegel first lectured on the philosophy of art. In 2022, the Hegel scholar and biographer Klaus Vieweg discovered more than 4,000 pages of previously undocumented transcripts of Hegel's Heidelberg lectures in the library of the Archdiocese of Munich and Freising. Written by Hegel's student Friedrich Wilhelm Carové between 1816 and 1818, and preserved in the estate of the theologian Friedrich Windischmann, the notes include a long-sought transcript of Hegel's Heidelberg lectures on aesthetics, of which no other record had survived. Scholars expect the material to help resolve longstanding questions about the authenticity of Heinrich Gustav Hotho's edition of the Lectures on Aesthetics, hitherto the principal source for Hegel's philosophy of art. In 1818, Hegel accepted the renewed offer of the chair of philosophy at the University of Berlin, which had remained vacant since Johann Gottlieb Fichte's death in 1814. Here, Hegel published his Elements of the Philosophy of Right (1821). Hegel devoted himself primarily to delivering lectures; his lectures on the philosophy of fine art, the philosophy of religion, the philosophy of history, and the history of philosophy were published posthumously from students' notes. In spite of his notoriously terrible delivery, his fame spread and his lectures attracted students from all over Germany and beyond. Meanwhile, Hegel and his pupils, such as Leopold von Henning and Friedrich Wilhelm Carové, were harassed and put under the surveillance of Prince Sayn-Wittgenstein, the interior minister of Prussia and his reactionary circles in the Prussian court. In the remainder of his career, he made two trips to Weimar, where he met with Goethe for the last time, and to Brussels, the Northern Netherlands, Leipzig, Vienna, Prague, and Paris.

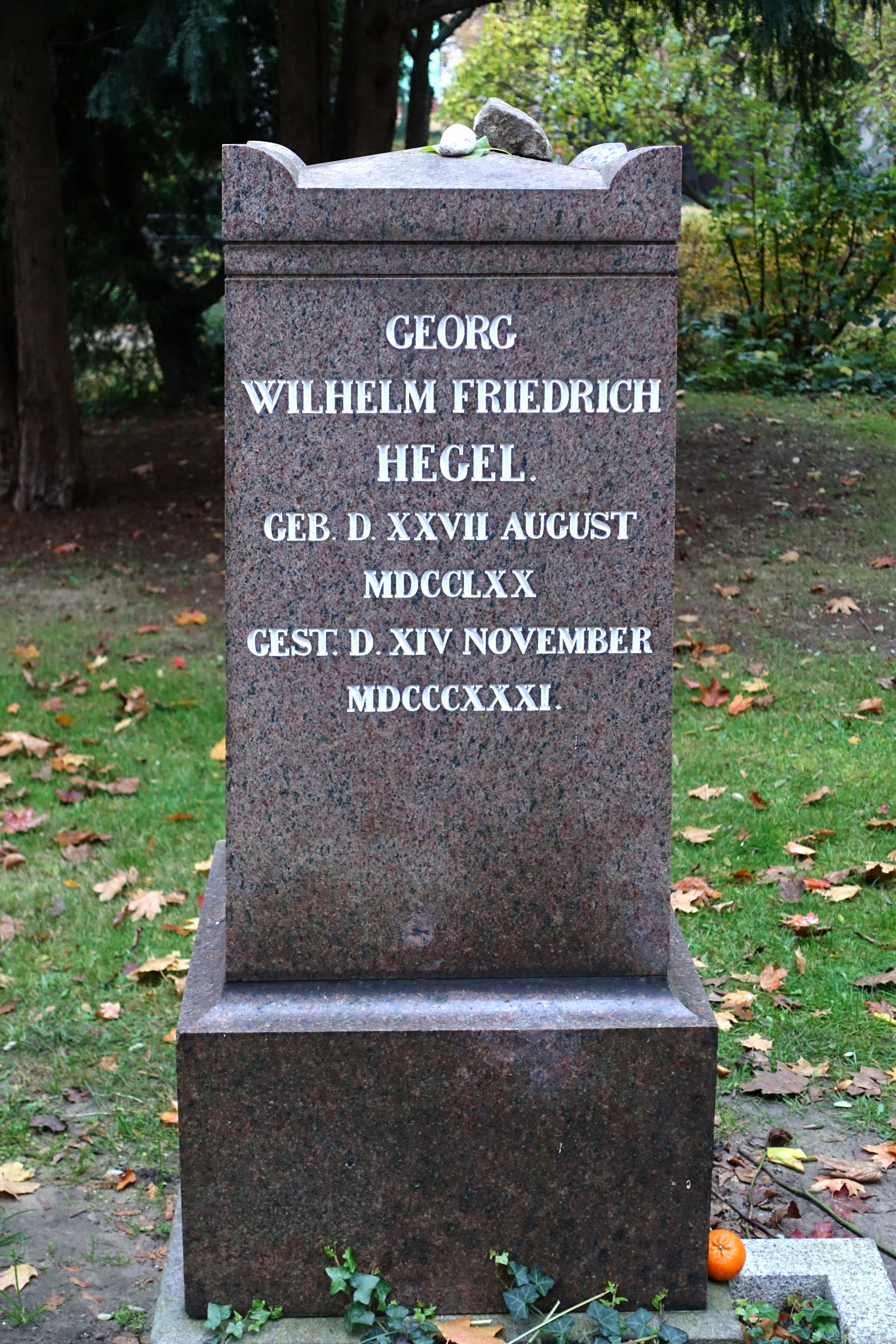
Hegel's tombstone in Berlin

During the last ten years of his life, Hegel did not publish another book but thoroughly revised the Encyclopedia (second edition, 1827; third, 1830). In his political philosophy, he criticized Karl Ludwig von Haller's reactionary work, which claimed that laws were not necessary. A number of other works on the philosophy of history, religion, aesthetics and the history of philosophy were compiled from the lecture notes of his students and published posthumously.

Hegel was appointed University Rector of the university in October 1829, but his term ended in September 1830. Hegel was deeply disturbed by the riots for reform in Berlin in that year. In 1831 Frederick William III decorated him with the Order of the Red Eagle, 3rd Class for his service to the Prussian state. In August 1831, a cholera epidemic reached Berlin and Hegel left the city, taking up lodgings in Kreuzberg. Now in a weak state of health, Hegel seldom went out. As the new semester began in October, Hegel returned to Berlin in the mistaken belief that the epidemic had largely subsided. By 14 November, Hegel was dead. The physicians pronounced the cause of death as cholera, but it is likely he died from another gastrointestinal disease. Heinrich Heine wrote that Hegel's last words were, "There was only one man who ever understood me, and even he didn't understand me." Some have described these words as apocryphal. He was buried on 16 November. In accordance with his wishes, Hegel was buried in the Dorotheenstadt cemetery next to Fichte and Karl Wilhelm Ferdinand Solger.

Hegel's illegitimate son, Ludwig Fischer, had died shortly before while serving with the Dutch army in Batavia and the news of his death never reached his father. Early the following year, Hegel's sister Christiane died by suicide by drowning. Hegel's two remaining sons – Karl, who became a historian; and Immanuel, who followed a theological path – lived long and safeguarded their father's manuscripts and letters, and produced editions of his works.

== Influences ==
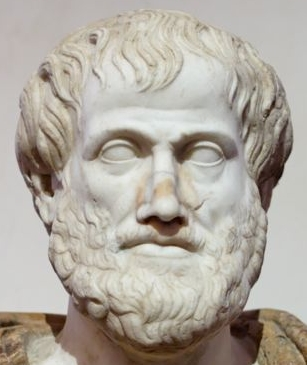
Aristotle and the ancient Greeks were a major influence on Hegel.

As H. S. Harris recounts, when Hegel entered the Tübingen seminary in 1788, "he was a typical product of the German Enlightenment – an enthusiastic reader of Rousseau and Lessing, acquainted with Kant (at least at second hand), but perhaps more deeply devoted to the classics than to any thing modern." During this early period of his life "the Greeks – especially Plato – came first." Although he later elevated Aristotle above Plato, Hegel never abandoned his love of ancient philosophy, the imprint of which is everywhere in his thought.

Hegel's concern with various forms of cultural unity (Judaic, Greek, medieval, and modern) during this early period would remain with him throughout his career. In this way, he was also a typical product of early German Romanticism. "Unity of life" was the phrase used by Hegel and his generation to express their concept of the highest good. It encompasses unity "with oneself, with others, and with nature. The main threat to such unity consists in division (Entzweiung) or alienation (Entfremdung)."

In this respect, Hegel was particularly taken with the phenomenon of love as a kind of "unity-in-difference," this both in the ancient articulation provided by Plato and in the Christian religion's doctrine of agape, which Hegel at this time viewed as "already 'grounded on universal Reason.'" This interest, as well as his theological training, would continue to mark his thought, even as it developed in a more theoretical or metaphysical direction. (Note: Of even his most philosophically technical work, Hegel writes, "It can therefore be said that this content is the exposition of God as he is in his eternal essence before the creation of nature and of finite spirit." See also the section on Christianity for further discussion of religion's important role in Hegel's later writings and lectures.)

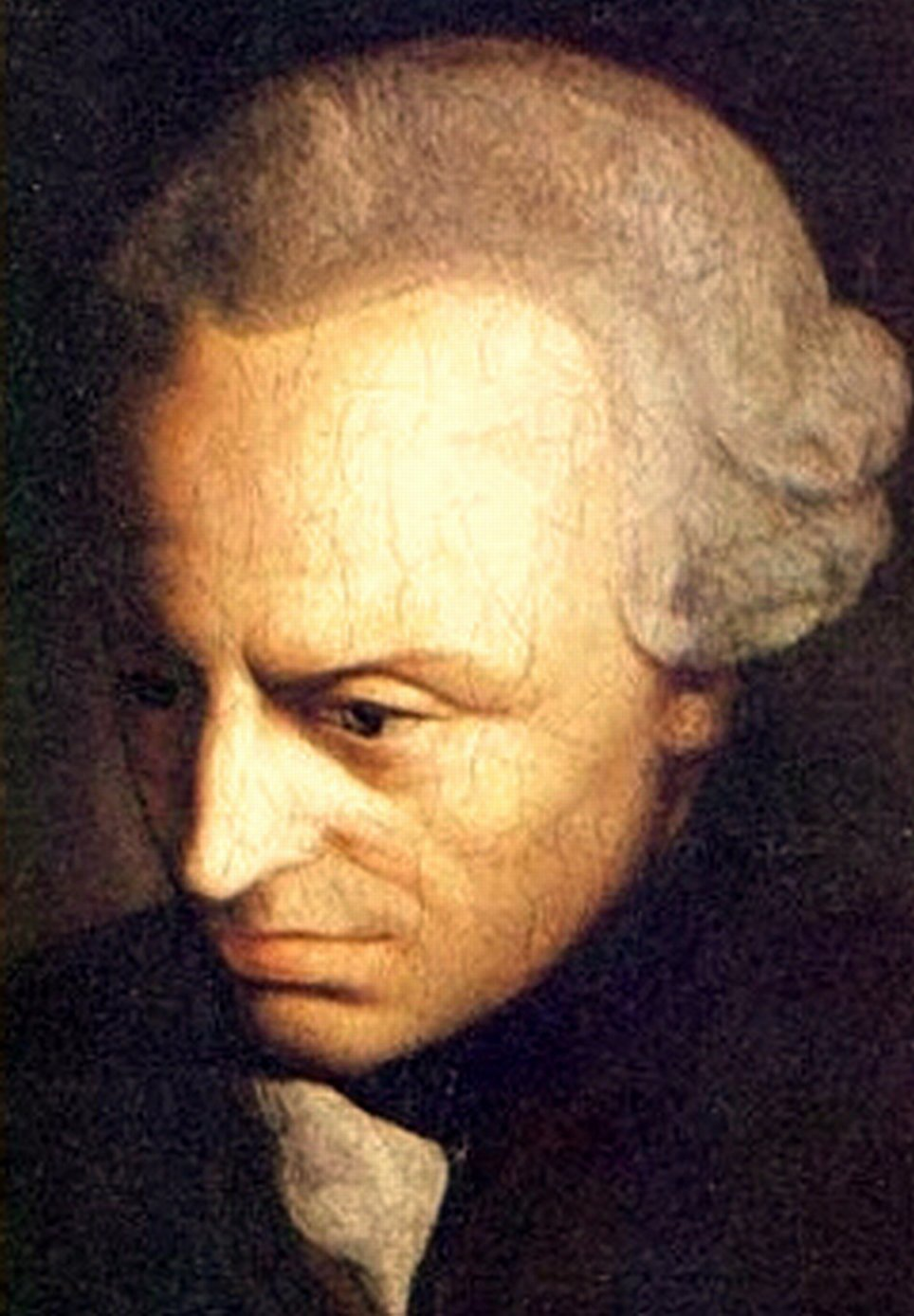
The critical philosophy of Immanuel Kant was a major influence on Hegel.

According to Glenn Alexander Magee, Hegel's thought (in particular, the tripartite structure of his system) also owes much to the hermetic tradition, in particular, the work of Jakob Böhme. The conviction that philosophy must take the form of a system Hegel owed, most particularly, to his Tübingen roommates, Schelling and Hölderlin.

Hegel also read widely and was much influenced by Adam Smith and other theorists of the political economy.

It was Kant's critical philosophy that provided what Hegel took as the definitive modern articulation of the divisions that must be overcome. This led to his engagement with the philosophical programs of Fichte and Schelling, as well as his attention to Spinoza and the pantheism controversy. (Note: For a discussion of this philosophical controversy, see Beiser 1993a, ch. 2–3.) The influence of Johann Gottfried von Herder, however, would lead Hegel to a qualified rejection of the universality claimed by the Kantian program in favor of a more culturally, linguistically, and historically informed account of reason.

== Phenomenology of Spirit ==
Phenomenology of Spirit was published in 1807. This is the first time that, at the age of thirty-six, Hegel lays out "his own distinctive approach" and adopts an "outlook that is recognizably 'Hegelian' to the philosophical problems of post-Kantian philosophy". Yet, the book was poorly understood even by Hegel's contemporaries and received mostly negative reviews. To this day, the Phenomenology is infamous for, among other things, its conceptual and allusive density, idiosyncratic terminology, and confusing transitions. Its most comprehensive commentary, scholar H. S. Harris's two-volume Hegel's Ladder (The Pilgrimage of Reason and The Odyssey of Spirit), runs more than three times the length of the text itself.

The fourth chapter of the Phenomenology includes Hegel's first presentation of the lord–bondsman dialectic, (Note: The German is Herrschaft und Knechtschaft, which can also be rendered "master and servant." "Slave," however, is an incorrect translation. The German for that would be der Sklave. Der Knecht, by contrast, is a servant, a menial, a farmhand, a serf, et cetera. None of the English translators render it "slave." It is most likely Alexandre Kojève's influential account of what he calls la dialectique du maître et de l'esclave that is responsible for this common error. (See Hegel's Reception in France, below, for discussion.) This matters philosophically because Hegel's terms here are an appropriation of Aristotle's analysis of the master-servant relation in his Politics (1253a24–1256b39) and Oeconomica. As Peperzak puts it (commenting upon the Encyclopedia version of the dialectic), "Hegel likewise emphasizes the mutual benefit and commonality of the union between a free master and the 'animal sapiens' who serves him as an appropriate organon." Or, as Harris remarks, "the master is the rational agent, and the 'slave' is the rational instrument.") the section of the book that has been most influential in general culture. What is at stake in the conflict Hegel presents is the practical (not theoretical) recognition or acknowledgement [Anerkennung, anerkennen] of the universality – i.e., personhood, humanity – of each of two opposed self-consciousnesses. (Note: Contrary to some interpretations, Hegel denies that this is the focal point of the Phenomenology. Instead, he directly states that it is the position of the "unhappy consciousness," presented later in that same chapter, that is "the birthplace of spirit becoming self-consciousness." Or, in the words of one scholar, "It is the unhappy consciousness, at the climax of the evolution of self-consciousness in opposition to nature, that marks the real birth of the concept of absolute spirit.") What the readers learn, but what the self-consciousnesses described do not yet realize, is that recognition can only be successful and actual as reciprocal or mutual. This is the case for the simple reason that the recognition of someone you do not recognize as properly human cannot count as genuine recognition. Hegel can also be seen here as criticizing the individualist worldview of people and society as a collection of atomized individuals, instead taking a holistic view of human self-consciousness as requiring the recognition of others, and people's view of themselves as being shaped by the views of others.

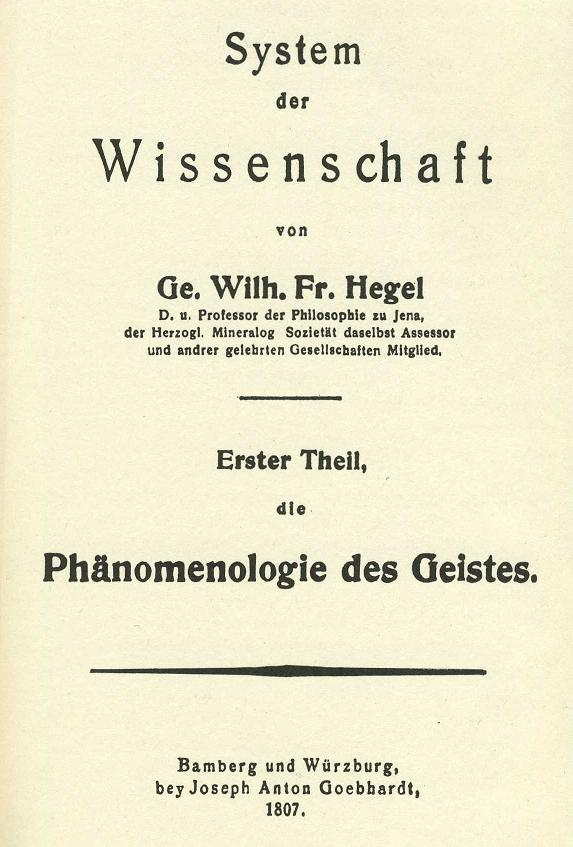
Title page of the original 1807 edition

Hegel describes the Phenomenology as both the "introduction" to his philosophical system and also as the "first part" of that system as the "science of the experience of consciousness." Yet it has long been controversial in both respects; indeed, Hegel's own attitude changed throughout his life. (Note: See, for instance, the discussion in Harris 1995, ch. 10 or the Introduction to Harris 1997, pp. 1–29. Endnotes in the latter supply additional references.)

Nevertheless, however complicated the details, the basic strategy by which it attempts to make good on its introductory claim is not difficult to state. Beginning with only the most basic "certainties of consciousness itself," "the most immediate of which is the certainty that I am conscious of this object, here and now," Hegel aims to show that these "certainties of natural consciousness" have as their consequence the standpoint of speculative logic.

This does not, however, make the Phenomenology a Bildungsroman. It is not the consciousness under observation that learns from its experience. Only "we," the phenomenological observers, are in a position to profit from Hegel's logical reconstruction of the science of experience.

The ensuing dialectic is long and hard. It is described by Hegel himself as a "path of despair," in which self-consciousness finds itself to be, over and again, in error. It is the self-concept of consciousness itself that is tested in the domain of experience, and where that concept is not adequate, self-consciousness "suffers this violence at its own hands, and brings to ruin its own restricted satisfaction." For, as Hegel points out, one cannot learn how to swim without getting into the water. By progressively testing its concept of knowledge in this way, by "making experience his standard of knowledge, Hegel is embarking upon nothing less than a transcendental deduction of metaphysics." (Note: "Certainly, to justify metaphysics through experience, Hegel has to extend the sense of 'experience' beyond its narrow Kantian limits, where it applies exclusively to sense perception. But Hegel thinks that Kant has artificially and arbitrarily restricted the meaning of experience, so that it means something as banal as 'Here is my lighter and there is my tobacco tin' (GP XX 352/III, 444–5). Experience is not only sense perception, Hegel insists, but also what is discovered and lived through. This is by no means a stipulative or technical sense of the word Erfahrung, and there is no need to replace it with another synonym, such as Erleben. Hegel is only reviving the original sense of the term, according to which Erfahrung is anything that one learns through experiment, through trial and error, or through enquiry about what appears to be the case. Hegel's term Erfahrung is therefore to be taken in its literal meaning: a journey or adventure (fahren), which arrives at a result (er-fahren), so that Erfahrung is quite literally das Ergebnis des Fahrts. The journey undertaken by consciousness in the Phenomenology is that of its own dialectic, and what it lives through as a result of this dialectic is its experience (73; ¶86).")

In the course of its dialectic, the Phenomenology purports to demonstrate that – because consciousness always includes self-consciousness – there are no 'given' objects of direct awareness not already mediated by thought. Further analysis of the structure of self-consciousness reveals that both the social and conceptual stability of the experiential world depend upon networks of reciprocal recognition. Failures of recognition, then, demand reflection upon the past as a way "to understand what is required of us at the present." For Hegel, this ultimately involves rethinking an interpretation of "religion as the collective reflection of the modern community on what ultimately counts for it." He contends, finally, that this "historically, socially construed philosophical account of that whole process" elucidates the genesis of a distinctly "modern" standpoint.

Another way of putting this is to say that the Phenomenology takes up Kant's philosophical project of investigating the capacities and limits of reason. Under the influence of Herder, however, Hegel proceeds historically, instead of altogether a priori. Yet, although proceeding historically, Hegel resists the relativistic consequences of Herder's own thought. In the words of one scholar, "It is Hegel's insight that reason itself has a history, that what counts as reason is the result of a development. This is something that Kant never imagines and that Herder only glimpses."

The Phenomenology of Spirit shows that the search for an externally objective criterion of truth is a fool's errand. The constraints on knowledge are necessarily internal to spirit itself. Yet, although theories and self-conceptions may always be reevaluated, renegotiated, and revised, this is not a merely imaginative exercise. Claims to knowledge must always prove their own adequacy in real historical experience.

Although Hegel seemed during his Berlin years to have abandoned The Phenomenology of Spirit, at the time of his unexpected death, he was in fact making plans to revise and republish it. As Hegel was no longer in need of money or credentials, H. S. Harris argues that "the only rational conclusion that can be drawn from his decision to republish the book… is that he still regarded the 'science of experience' as a valid project in itself" and one for which later system has no equivalent. There is, however, no scholarly consensus about the Phenomenology with respect to either of the systematic roles asserted by Hegel at the time of its publication. (Note: Contrast, for instance, Harris 1995, ch. 10 with Houlgate 2006, ch. 7 or Collins 2013.) (Note: Robert Stern makes a point about the more general relation of the Phenomenology to the Berlin system: "whilst everyone recognizes that the Phenomenology marks a turning-point in Hegel's philosophical career, ...certain remarks by Hegel himself have led some to warn that we should not expect to fit the Phenomenology into his final philosophical outlook without remainder (where some go on to claim that that final outlook introduced certain deplorable elements that are thankfully missing in the Phenomenology as an earlier work, while others go on to disparage the Phenomenology as a misleading guide to Hegel's ultimate position).")

== Philosophical system ==
Diagram illustrating Hegel's system, which includes philosophies of logic, nature, and spirit

Hegel's philosophical system is divided into three parts: the science of logic, the philosophy of nature (Naturphilosophie), and the philosophy of spirit (the latter two of which together constitute the real philosophy). This structure is adopted from Proclus's Neoplatonic triad of "'remaining-procession-return' and from the Christian Trinity." (Note: "Hegel differs from the Neoplatonists, however, in that his originary One (to Hen) is immanent in the onto-noētic universe. In contrast to Plotinus and Proclus, Hegel rejects the possibility of any separate infinity.") Although evident in draft writings dating back as early as 1805, the system was not completed in published form until the 1817 Encyclopedia (1st ed.).

Historian of philosophy Frederick C. Beiser argues that the position of the logic with respect to the real philosophy is best understood in terms of Hegel's appropriation of Aristotle's distinction between "the order of explanation" and "the order of being." (Note: Beiser refers the reader to Aristotle's Metaphysics, Book V, 11, 1018b, 30–6; Book IX, 8, 1050a, 3–20.) To Beiser, Hegel is neither a Platonist who believes in abstract logical entities, nor a nominalist according to whom the particular is first in the orders of explanation and being alike. Rather, Hegel is a holist. For Hegel, the universal is always first in the order of explanation even if what is naturally particular is first in the order of being. With respect to the system as a whole, that universal is supplied by the logic.

Scholar Michael J. Inwood states, "The logical idea is non-temporal and therefore does not exist at any time apart from its manifestations." To ask "when" it divides into nature and spirit is analogous to asking "when" 12 divides into 5 and 7. The question does not have an answer because it is predicated upon a fundamental misunderstanding of its terms. The task of the logic (at this high systemic level) is to articulate what Hegel calls "the identity of identity and non-identity" of nature and spirit. Put another way, it aims to overcome subject–object dualism. This is to say that, among other things, Hegel's philosophical project endeavors to provide the metaphysical basis for an account of spirit that is continuous with, yet distinct from, the "merely" natural world – without thereby reducing either term to the other.

Furthermore, the final sections of Hegel's Encyclopedia suggest that to give priority to any one of its three parts is to have an interpretation that is "one-sided," incomplete or otherwise inaccurate. As Hegel declares, "The true is the whole."

=== Science of Logic ===
Hegel's concept of logic differs greatly from that of the ordinary English sense of the term. This can be seen, for instance, in such metaphysical definitions of logic as "the science of things grasped in [the] thoughts that used to be taken to express the essentialities of the things." As Michael Wolff explains, Hegel's logic is a continuation of Kant's distinctive logical program. Its occasional engagement with the familiar Aristotelian conception of logic is only incidental to Hegel's project. Twentieth-century developments by such logicians as Frege and Russell likewise remain logics of formal validity and so are likewise irrelevant to Hegel's project, which aspires to provide a metaphysical logic of truth.

There are two texts of Hegel's Logic. The first, The Science of Logic (1812, 1813, 1816; Book I revised 1831), is sometimes also called the "Greater Logic." The second is the first volume of Hegel's Encyclopedia and is sometimes known as the "Lesser Logic." The Encyclopedia Logic is an abbreviated or condensed presentation of the same dialectic. Hegel composed it for use with students in the lecture hall, not as a substitute for its proper, book-length exposition. (Note: The opening section, entitled "Preliminary Conception," also provides a historical examination of philosophical "positions on objectivity" as quite a different sort of "introduction" to the logic than what Hegel earlier gave in the Phenomenology of Spirit. To what extent Hegel preferred this approach over that of his earlier book is a matter of ongoing debate.)

Hegel presents logic as a presuppositionless science that investigates the most fundamental thought-determinations [Denkbestimmungen], or categories, and so constitutes the basis of philosophy. In putting something into question, one already presupposes logic; in this regard, it is the only field of inquiry that must constantly reflect upon its own mode of functioning. The Science of Logic is Hegel's attempt to meet this foundational demand. (Note: For further discussion of what it means for logic to be presuppositionless see, in particular, Houlgate 2006, part I and Hentrup 2019.) As he puts it, "logic coincides with metaphysics." In the words of scholar Glenn Alexander Magee, the logic provides "an account of pure categories or ideas which are timelessly true" and which make up "the formal structure of reality itself".

This is not, however, a return to the Leibnizian–Wolffian rationalism critiqued by Kant, which is a criticism Hegel accepts. Hegel rejects any form of metaphysics as speculation about the transcendent. His procedure, an appropriation of Aristotle's concept of form, is fully immanent. More generally, Hegel agrees with Kant's rejection of all forms of dogmatism and also agrees that any future metaphysics must pass the test of criticism.

Philosopher Béatrice Longuenesse holds that this project may be understood, on analogy to Kant, as "inseparably a metaphysical and a transcendental deduction of the categories of metaphysics." (Note: Kant's "metaphysical deduction" of the categories is a derivation of categories from the Aristotelian table of "the twelve logical functions or forms of judgments." The "transcendental deduction" advances the more ambitious argument that these a priori categories do, in fact, "apply universally and necessarily to the objects that are given in our experience.") This approach insists, and claims to demonstrate, that the insights of logic cannot be judged by standards external to thought itself, that is, that "thought... is not the mirror of nature." Yet, she argues, this does not imply that these standards are arbitrary or subjective. Hegel's translator and scholar of German idealism George di Giovanni likewise interprets the Logic as (drawing upon, yet also in opposition to, Kant) immanently transcendental; its categories, according to Hegel, are built into life itself, and define what it is to be "an object in general."

Books one and two of the Logic are the doctrines of "Being" and "Essence." Together they comprise the Objective Logic, which is largely occupied with overcoming the assumptions of traditional metaphysics. Book three is the final part of the Logic. It discusses the doctrine of "the Concept," which is concerned with reintegrating those categories of objectivity into a thoroughly idealistic account of reality. (Note: "In the Doctrine of the Concept, thought reflects for the first time consciously and explicitly on thought itself, and all the preceding categories are understood to have their meaning and significance precisely in being comprehended by a self-aware thought. The concept is thought "In its being-returned-into-itself [Zurückgekehrtsein in sich selbst] and its developed being-with-itself [Beisichsein] – the concept in-and for-itself" [Hegel 1991b, §83]. The dialectic of Hegel's Logic demonstrates how the pure thought-categories of being and essence pass over into the categories of the concept; how the concept reveals, again, the fundamental unity of being and essence.") Simplifying greatly, Being describes its concepts just as they appear, Essence attempts to explain them with reference to opposites, and the Concept explains and unites them both in terms of an internal teleology. The categories of Being "pass over" from one to the next as denoting thought-determinations only extrinsically connected to one another. The categories of Essence reciprocally "shine" into one another. Finally, in the Concept, thought has shown itself to be fully self-referential, and so its categories organically "develop" from one to the next.

In Hegel's technical sense of the term, the concept (Begriff, sometimes also rendered "notion," capitalized by some translators but not others (Note: George di Giovanni offers this in defense of "concept": "Following Geraets/Suchting/Harris, I have departed from long-standing usage and have translated Begriff as 'concept' rather than as 'notion.' B. C. Burt also used 'concept' in his 1896 translation of Erdmann's Outlines of Logic and Metaphysics, for the very good reason that 'notion' carries the connotation of being a subjective representation. Its meaning is also much too vague. It should be reserved for precisely such contexts as require a term without too precise a meaning. 'Concept' has the further advantage of being patently connected with 'to conceive,' just as Begriff is connected with greifen, and can easily be expanded into 'conceptual' and 'conceptually grasped' or replaced, if need be, with 'comprehension' and 'conceptually comprehended.'")) is not a psychological concept. When deployed with the definitive article ("the") and sometimes modified by the term "logical," Hegel is referring to the intelligible structure of reality as articulated in the Subjective Logic. (When used in the plural, however, Hegel's sense is much closer to the ordinary dictionary sense of the term.)

Hegel's inquiry into thought is concerned to systematize thought's own internal self-differentiation, that is, how pure concepts (logical categories) differ from one another in their various relations of implication and interdependence. For instance, in the opening dialectic of the Logic, Hegel claims to display that the thought of "being, pure being – without further determination" is indistinguishable from the concept of nothing, and that, in this "passing back and forth" of being and nothing, "each immediately vanishes in its opposite." This movement is neither one concept nor the other, but the category of becoming. There is not a difference here to which one can "refer," only a dialectic that one can observe and describe.

The final category of the Logic is "the idea." As with "the concept", the sense of this term for Hegel is not psychological. Rather, following Kant in The Critique of Pure Reason, Hegel's usage harks back to the Greek eidos, Plato's concept of form that is fully existent and universal: "Hegel's Idee (like Plato's idea) is the product of an attempt to fuse ontology, epistemology, evaluation, etc., into a single set of concepts."

The Logic accommodates within itself the necessity of the realm of natural-spiritual contingency, that which cannot be determined in advance: "To go further, it must abandon thinking altogether and let itself go, opening itself to that which is other than thought in pure receptivity." Simply put, logic realizes itself only in the domain of nature and spirit, in which it attains its "verification." (Note: "The concept of philosophy is the self-thinking idea, the knowing truth (§236), the logical with the meaning that it is the universality verified [bewährte] in the concrete content as in its actuality.") Hence the conclusion of the Science of Logic with "the idea freely discharging [entläßt] itself" into "objectivity and external life" – and, so too, the systematic transition to the Realphilosophie.

=== Philosophy of the real ===
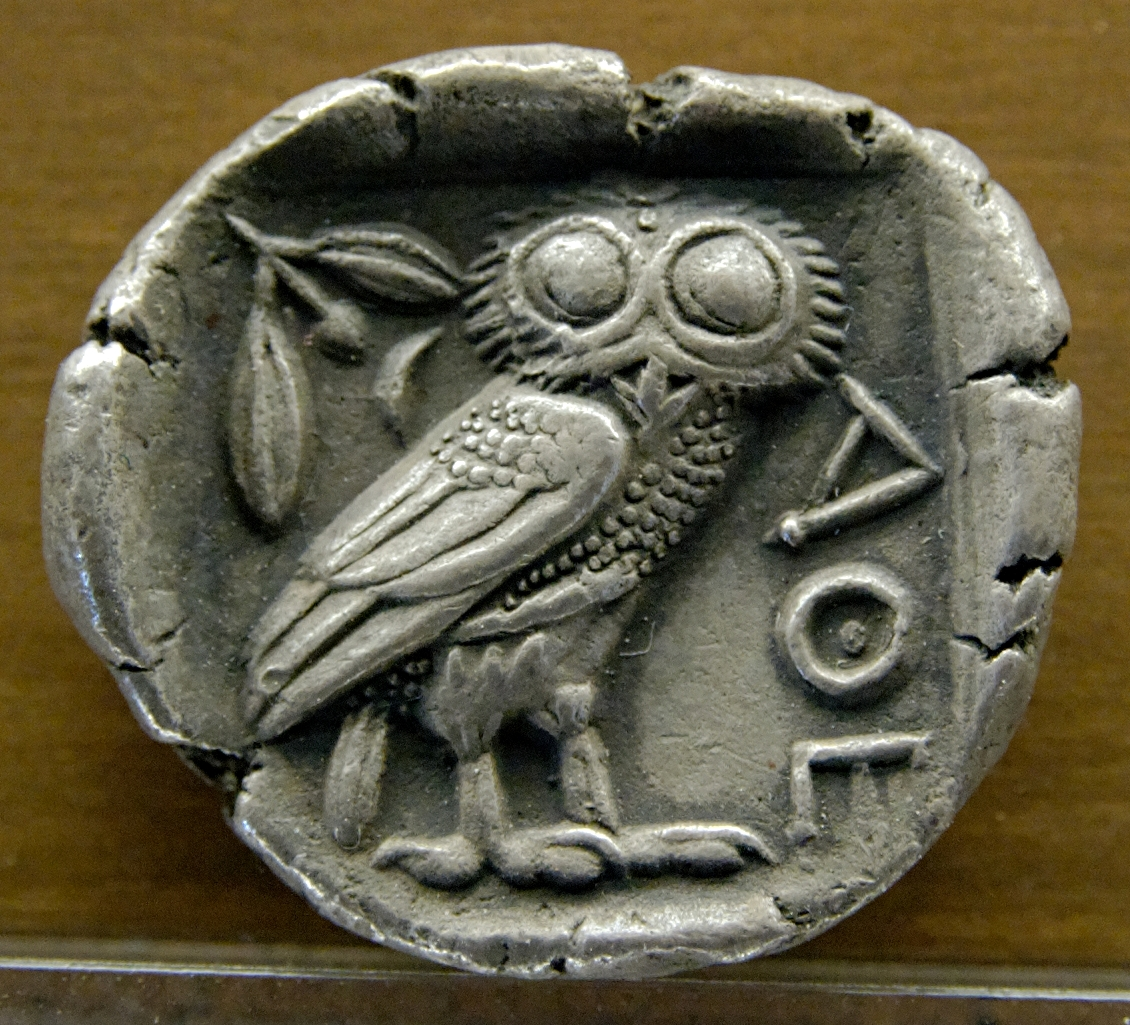
Hegel uses the Owl of Minerva as a metaphor for how philosophy can understand historical conditions only after they occur.

In contrast to the first, logical part of Hegel's system, the second, real-philosophical part – the philosophy of nature and of spirit – is an ongoing project with respect to its historical content, which continues to change and develop. For instance, although Hegel regards "the basic structure" of the philosophy of nature as complete, he was "aware that science is not 'finished' and will continue to make new discoveries". Philosophy is, as Hegel puts it, "its own time comprehended in thoughts."

He expands upon this definition:

A further word on the subject of issuing instructions on how the world ought to be: philosophy, at any rate, always comes too late to perform this function. As the thought of the world, it appears only at a time when actuality has gone through its formative process and attained its completed state [sich fertig gemacht]. This lesson of the concept is necessarily also apparent from history, namely that it is only when actuality [Wirklichkeit] has reached maturity that the ideal appears opposite the real and reconstructs this real world, which it has grasped in its substance, in the shape of an intellectual realm. When philosophy paints its gray in gray, a shape of life has grown old, and it cannot be rejuvenated, but only recognized, by the gray in gray of philosophy; the owl of Minerva begins its flight only with the onset of dusk.

This frequently has been read as an expression of the impotence of philosophy, political or otherwise, and a rationalization of the status quo. Scholar Allegra de Laurentiis, however, points out that the German expression "sich fertig machen", translated as "getting ready" or "to get ready", does not only imply completion, but also preparedness. This additional meaning is important because it better reflects Hegel's Aristotelian concept of actuality. He characterizes actuality as being-at-work-staying-itself that can never be once-and-for-all completed or finished.

Hegel describes the relationship between the logical and the real-philosophical parts of his system in this way: "If philosophy does not stand above its time in content, it does so in form, because, as the thought and knowledge of that which is the substantial spirit of its time, it makes that spirit its object."

This is to say that what makes the philosophy of the real scientific in Hegel's technical sense is the systematically coherent logical form it uncovers in its natural-historical material – and so also displays in its presentation.

=== The Philosophy of Nature ===
The philosophy of nature organizes the contingent material of the natural sciences systematically. As part of the philosophy of the real, in no way does it presume to "tell nature what it must be like." Historically, various interpreters have questioned Hegel's understanding of the natural sciences of his time. However, this claim has been largely refuted by recent scholarship.

One of the very few ways in which the philosophy of nature might correct claims made by the natural sciences themselves is to combat reductive explanations; that is, to discredit accounts employing categories not adequate to the complexity of the phenomena they purport to explain, as for instance, attempting to explain life in strictly chemical terms.

Although Hegel and other Naturphilosophen aim to revive a teleological understanding of nature, they argue that their strictly internal or immanent concept of teleology is "limited to the ends observable within nature itself." Hence, they claim, it does not violate the Kantian critique. Even more strongly, Hegel and Schelling claim that Kant's restriction of teleology to regulative status effectively undermines his own critical project of explaining the possibility of knowledge. Their argument is that "only under the assumption that there is an organism is it possible to explain the actual interaction between the subjective and the objective, the ideal and the real." Hence, the organism must be acknowledged to have constitutive status.

Introducing Hegel's philosophy of nature for a 21st-century audience, Dieter Wandschneider observes that "contemporary philosophy of science" has lost sight of "the ontological issue at stake, namely, the question of an intrinsically lawful nature": "Consider, for example, the problem of what constitutes a law of nature. This problem is central to our understanding of nature. Yet philosophy of science has not provided a definitive response to it up to now. Nor can we expect to have such an answer from that quarter in future." It is back to Hegel that Wandschneider would direct philosophers of science for guidance in the philosophy of nature.

Recent scholars have also argued that Hegel's approach to the philosophy of nature provides valuable resources for theorizing and confronting recent environmental challenges entirely unforeseen by Hegel. These philosophers point to such aspects of his philosophy as its distinctive metaphysical grounding and the continuity of its conception of the nature-spirit relationship.

=== The Philosophy of Spirit ===
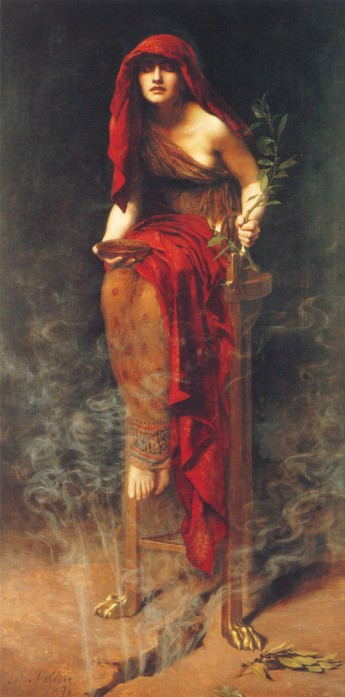
Priestess of Delphi (1891) by John Collier. The Delphic imperative to "know thyself" governs Hegel's entire philosophy of spirit.

The German Geist has a wide range of meanings. (Note: See Inwood 1992, pp. 274–77, "Spirit" for an elaboration.) In its most general Hegelian sense, however, "Geist denotes the human mind and its products, in contrast to nature and also the logical idea." (Some older translations render it as "mind," rather than "spirit." (Note: Inwood further elaborates the justification for preferring "spirit" as the translation: "Geist is the usual German word for the intellectual aspect of an individual, the mind, but in the Phenomenology it more commonly refers to the collective mind or 'spirit' shared by a group of people. It is, as Hegel memorably puts it, 'I that is We, and We that is I' (PS ¶177). It can also refer to the third person of the Trinity, the holy spirit, and this religious connotation is never far from Hegel's mind when he uses the word Geist."))

As is especially evident in the Anthropology, Hegel's concept of spirit is an appropriation and transformation of the self-referential Aristotelian concept of energeia. Spirit is not something above or otherwise external to nature. It is "the highest organization and development" of nature's powers.

According to Hegel, "the essence of spirit is freedom." The Encyclopedia Philosophy of Spirit charts the progressively determinate stages of this freedom until spirit fulfills the Delphic imperative with which Hegel begins: "Know thyself."

As becomes clear, Hegel's concept of freedom is not (or not merely) the capacity for arbitrary choice, but has as its "core notion" that "something, especially a person, is free if and only if, it is independent and self-determining, not determined by or dependent upon something other than itself." It is, in other words, (at least predominantly, dialectically) an account of what Isaiah Berlin would later term positive liberty.

==== Subjective spirit ====
Standing at the transition from nature to spirit, the role of the Philosophy of Subjective Spirit is to analyze "the elements necessary for or presupposed by such relations [of objective spirit], namely, the structures characteristic of and necessary to the individual rational agent." It does this by elaborating "the fundamental nature of the biological/spiritual human individual along with the cognitive and the practical prerequisites of human social interaction."

This section, particularly its first part, contains various comments that were commonplace in Hegel's day and can now be recognized as openly racist, such as unfounded claims about the "naturally" lower intellectual and emotional development of Black people. In his perspective, these racial differences are related to climate: according to Hegel, it is not racial characteristics, but the climatic conditions in which a people lives that variously limit or enable its capacity for free self-determination. He believes that race is not destiny: any group could, in principle, improve and transform its condition by migrating to friendlier climes. (Note: For a discussion of Hegel's racial comments in the Anthropology, informed by the 19th-century literature available to Hegel, see de Laurentiis 2021, ch. 4.)

Hegel divides his philosophy of the subjective spirit into three parts: anthropology, phenomenology, and psychology. Anthropology "deals with 'soul', which is spirit still mired in nature: all that within us which precedes our self-conscious mind or intellect." In the section "Phenomenology", Hegel examines the relation between consciousness and its object and the emergence of intersubjective rationality. Psychology "deals with a great deal that would be categorized as epistemology (or 'theory of knowledge') today. Hegel discusses, among other things, the nature of attention, memory, imagination and judgement."

Throughout this section, but especially in the Anthropology, Hegel appropriates and develops Aristotle's hylomorphic approach to what was later theorized as the mind–body problem, the solution to which "hinges upon recognizing that mind does not act upon the body as cause of effects but rather acts upon itself as an embodied living subjectivity. As such, mind develops itself, progressively attaining more and more of a self-determined character."

Its final section, Free Spirit, develops the concept of "free will", which is foundational for Hegel's philosophy of right.

==== Objective spirit, or sociopolitical philosophy ====
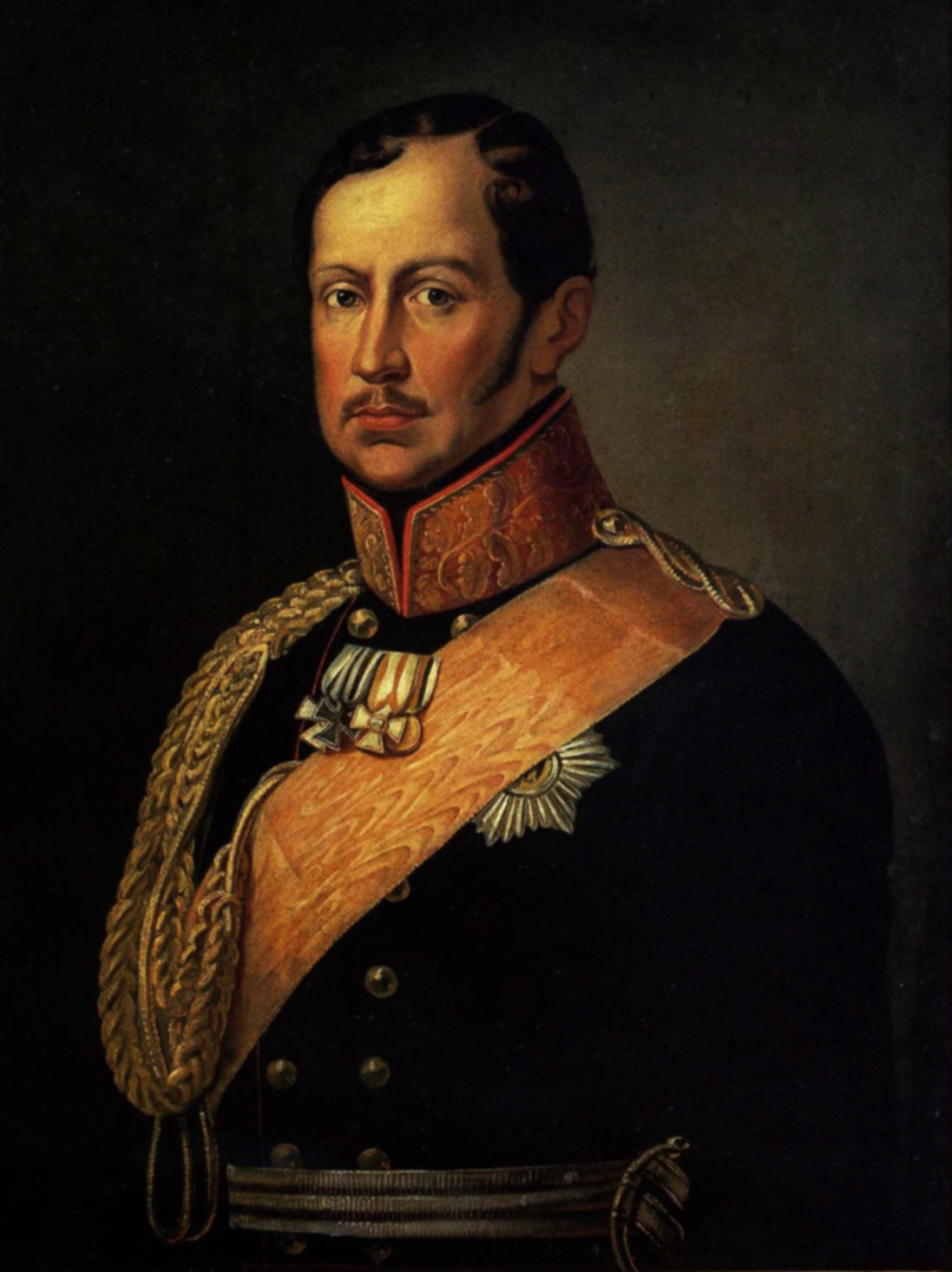
King Frederick William III of Prussia (r. 1797–1840) stifled the political reforms for which Hegel had hoped and advocated.

In the broadest terms, Hegel's philosophy of objective spirit "is his social philosophy, his philosophy of how the human spirit objectifies itself in its social and historical activities and productions." Or, put differently, it is an account of the institutionalization of freedom. Beiser declares this a rare instance of unanimity in Hegel scholarship: "all scholars agree there is no more important concept in Hegel's political theory than freedom." This is because it is the foundation of right, the essence of spirit, and the telos of history.

It is presented in the Encyclopedia (1817; rev. 1827, 1830; a textbook from which lectured) and in the Elements of the Philosophy of Right, or Natural Law and Political Science in Outline (1821, also a textbook). Its final part, the philosophy of world history, was additionally elaborated in Hegel's lectures on the subject. The Philosophy of Right was controversial from its publication. It is not, however, a straightforward defense of the autocratic Prussian state, as some have alleged, but is rather a defense of "Prussia as it was to have become under [proposed] reform administrations." The German Recht in Hegel's title does not have a direct English equivalent (though it does correspond to the Latin ius and the French droit). As a first approximation, Michael Inwood distinguishes three senses:

- a right, claim or title
- justice (as in, e.g., 'to administer justice' ... but not justice as a virtue ...)
- 'the law' as a principle, or 'the laws' collectively.

Beiser observes that Hegel's theory is "his attempt to rehabilitate the natural law tradition while taking into account the criticisms of the historical school." He adds that "without a sound interpretation of Hegel's theory of natural law, we have very little understanding of the very foundation of his social and political thought." (Note: Hegel himself acknowledges an ambiguity in the term "natural right" [Naturrecht] between meaning "a right that is present in an immediately natural way" and a right that is "determined by the nature of the thing [Sache], i.e., by the concept." His is the latter: "In fact right and all of its determinations are based on free personhood alone, a self-determination, which is the very contrary of determination by nature. His most direct discussion of the vocabulary of natural right may be in the Introduction to his 1817–1818 Heidelberg lectures, after which he almost always speaks of right simplicitur or right as modified by his own distinct philosophical terms.) Like Beiser, scholar Adriaan Theodoor Peperzak documents Hegel's arguments against social contract theory and stresses the metaphysical foundations of Hegel's philosophy of right. (Note: Some commentators do not accept Hegel's own metaphysical self-understanding of his project. Allen W. Wood, for instance, declares, "Speculative thought is dead; but Hegel's thought is not": "The fact is rather that Hegel's great positive achievements as a philosopher do not lie where he thought they did." According to Wood, to read Hegel primarily as a social theorist is "admittedly, to read him in some measure against his own self-understanding; it is nevertheless the only way in which most of us, if we are honest with ourselves, can read him seriously at all.")

Scholar Kenneth R. Westphal outlines the Philosophy of Right to show that "political autonomy is fundamental to Hegel's analysis":

- "'Abstract Right,' treats principles governing property, its transfer, and wrongs against property."
- "'Morality,' treats the rights of moral subjects, responsibility for one's actions, and a priori theories of right."
- "'Ethical Life' (Sittlichkeit), analyzes the principles and institutions governing central aspects of rational social life, including the family, civil society, and the state as a whole, including the government."

Hegel describes the state of his time, a constitutional monarchy, as rationally embodying three mutually inclusive elements. These elements are "democracy (rule of the many, who are involved in legislation), aristocracy (rule of the few, who apply, concretize, and execute the laws), and monarchy (rule of the one, who heads and encompasses all power)." It is what Aristotle called a "mixed" form of government, which is designed to include what is best of each of the three classical forms. The separation of powers "prevents a single power from dominating others". Hegel is particularly concerned to bind the monarch to the constitution, limiting his authority so that he can do little more than to declare of what his ministers have already decided that it is to be so.

The relation of Hegel's philosophy of right to modern liberalism is complex. He sees liberalism as a valuable and characteristic expression of the modern world. However, it carries the danger within itself to undermine its own values. This self-destructive tendency may be avoided by measuring "the subjective goals of individuals by a larger objective and collective good." Moral values, then, have only a "limited place in the total scheme of things." Yet, although it is not without reason that Hegel is widely regarded as a major proponent of what Isaiah Berlin would later term positive liberty, he was just as "unwavering and unequivocal" in his defense of negative liberty.

If Hegel's ideal sovereign is much weaker than was typical in monarchies of his time, so too is his democratic element much weaker than is typical in democracies of modern times. Although he insists upon the importance of public participation, Hegel severely limits suffrage and follows the English bicameral model, in which only members of the lower house, that of commoners and bourgeoisie, are elected officials. Nobles in the upper house, like the monarch, inherit their positions.

The final part of the Philosophy of Objective Spirit is entitled "World History." In this section, Hegel argues that "this immanent principle [the Stoic logos] produces with logical inevitability an expansion of the species' capacities for self determination ('freedom') and a deepening of its self understanding ('self-knowing')." In Hegel's own words: "World history is progress in the consciousness of freedom – a progress that we must comprehend conceptually."

==== Absolute spirit ====
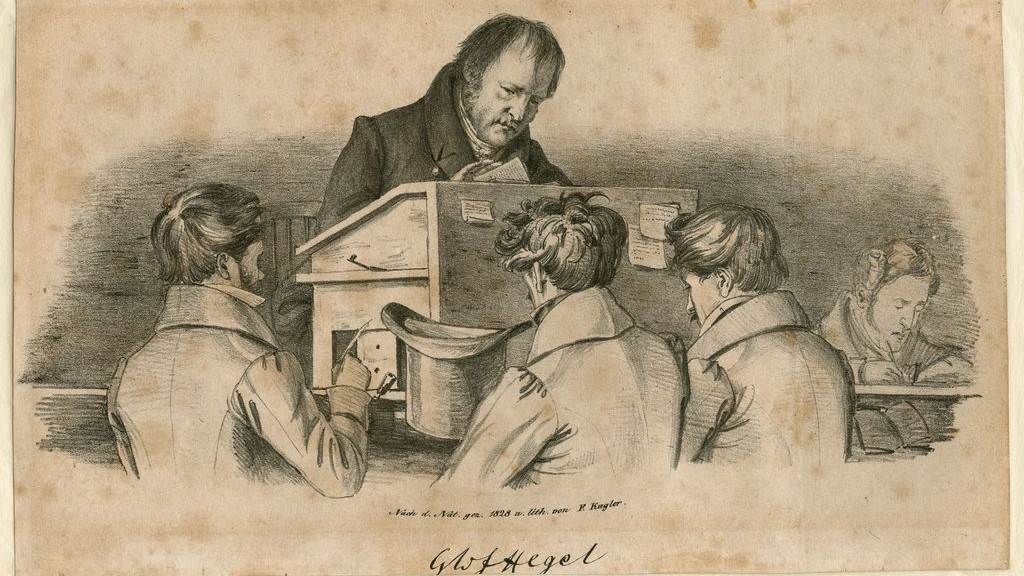
Hegel with his Berlin students (1828 sketch by F. T. Kugler)

Hegel's use of the term "absolute" is easily misunderstood. Inwood, however, clarifies: derived from the Latin absolutus, it means "not dependent on, conditional on, relative to or restricted by anything else; self-contained, perfect, complete." For Hegel, this means that absolute knowing can only denote "an 'absolute relation' in which the ground of experience and the experiencing agent are one and the same: the object known is explicitly the subject who knows." That is, the only "thing" (which is really an activity) that is truly absolute is that which is entirely self-conditioned, and, according to Hegel, this only occurs when spirit takes itself up as its own object. The final section of his Philosophy of Spirit presents the three modes of such absolute knowing: art, religion, and philosophy. (Note: As Walter Jaeschke, German scholar and editor of the critical Gesammelte Werke edition of Hegel's works puts it, "It is only in this sphere that spirit brings forth a shape – an image of itself, as it were – and relates itself to this shape in the forms of intuition [art], representation [religion], and comprehending thinking [philosophy/logic]. It is here that spirit relates itself to itself and is absolute precisely in its self-relation. It cognizes itself as what it is and it is with itself (bei sich) and free in this cognition. Only with this cognition is the concept of spirit – as the concept of a thinking relation to self – complete.")

It is with reference to different modalities of consciousness – intuition, representation, and comprehending thinking – that Hegel distinguishes the three modes of absolute knowing. (Note: His best discussion, per Beiser 2005, p. 288, is (oddly) to be found in The Lectures on the Philosophy of Religion v.1, pp. 234ff.) Frederick Beiser summarizes: "art, religion and philosophy all have the same object, the absolute or truth itself; but they consist in different forms of knowledge of it. Art presents the absolute in the form of immediate intuition (Anschauung); religion presents it in the form of representation (Vorstellung); and philosophy presents it in the form of concepts (Begriffe)."

The German philosopher Rüdiger Bubner additionally clarifies that the increase in conceptual transparency according to which these spheres are systematically ordered is not hierarchical in any evaluative sense.

Although Hegel's discussion of absolute spirit in the Encyclopedia is quite brief, he develops his account at length in lectures on the philosophy of fine art, the philosophy of religion, and the history of philosophy.

== Philosophy of art ==
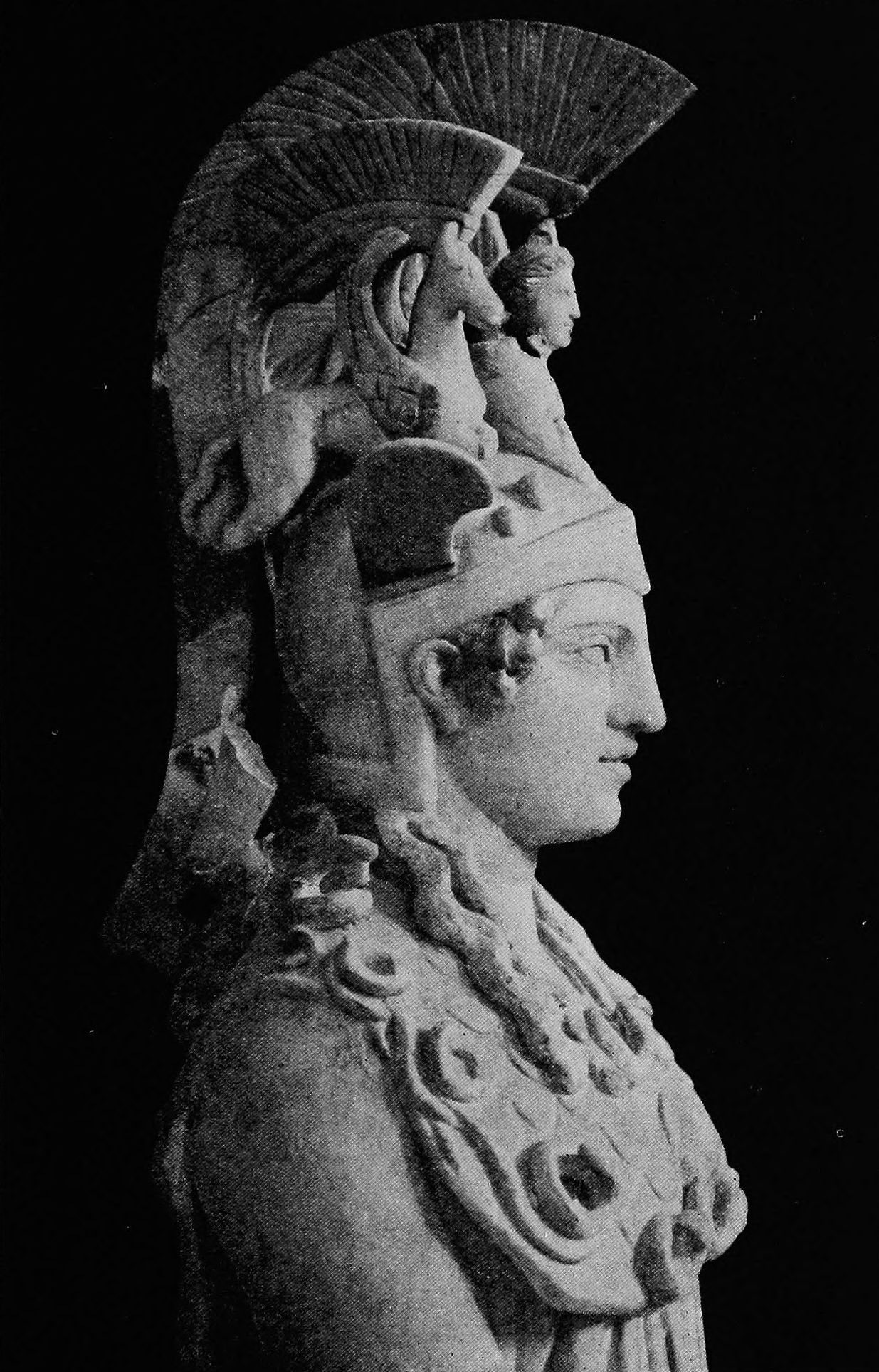
The ancient Athenian, according to Hegel, apprehends the meaning of Athena Parthenos directly as his own rational essence. (The Varvakeion Athena, National Archaeological Museum of Athens.)

In the Phenomenology, and even in the 1817 edition of the Encyclopedia, Hegel discusses art only as it figures in what he terms the "Art-Religion" of the ancient Greeks. In 1818, however, Hegel begins lecturing on the philosophy of art as an explicitly autonomous domain. (Note: He does not, however, abandon his account of the Art-Religion, which continues to appear in his Lectures on the Philosophy of Religion during the same period. These two modes of absolute spirit, although conceptually distinct, historically overlap or intersect in ancient Greece.)

Although H. G. Hotho titled his edition of the Lectures Vorlesungen über die Ästhetik [Lectures on Aesthetics], Hegel directly states that his topic is not "the spacious realm of the beautiful," but "art, or, rather, fine art." He doubles down on this in the next paragraph by explicitly distinguishing his project from the broader philosophical projects pursued under the heading of "aesthetics" by Christian Wolff and Alexander Gottlieb Baumgarten. (Note: See also, for discussion, Pippin 2008a, pp. 394–418.)

Some critics – most canonically, Benedetto Croce, in 1907 – have attributed to Hegel some form of the thesis that art is "dead." Hegel, however, never said any such thing, nor can such a view be plausibly attributed to him. (Note: For discussion from two quite different perspectives, see Henrich 1979, pp. 107–33 and Houlgate 2007, pp. xxii–xxvi.) Indeed, one commentator places that debate in perspective with the observation that Hegel's claim that "art no longer serves our highest aims" is "radical not for the suggestion that art now fails to do so but for the suggestion that it ever did."

Hegel's detailed and systematic treatment of the various arts over such a great span has even led art historian Ernst Gombrich to present Hegel as "the father of art history." For most of their history, Hegel's Lectures were largely ignored by philosophers and received most of their attention from literary critics and art historians.

The more narrowly conceptual project of the philosophy of art, however, is to articulate and defend "the autonomy of art, making possible an account of the special individuality distinguishing works of aesthetic worth."

According to Hegel, "'artistic beauty reveals absolute truth through perception.' He holds that the best art conveys metaphysical knowledge by revealing, through sense perception, what is unconditionally true,'" that is, "what his metaphysical theory affirms to be unconditional or absolute." So, while Hegel "ennobles art insofar as it conveys metaphysical knowledge," "he tempers his assessment in view of his belief that art's sensory media can never adequately convey what completely transcends the contingency of sensation." This is why, according to Hegel, art can only be one of three mutually complementary modes of absolute spirit. (Note: See the directly above for explanatory discussion.)

== Christianity ==
Although his understanding of Christianity evolved over time, Hegel identified as a Lutheran his entire life. One constant was his profound appreciation for the Christian insight into the intrinsic worth and freedom of every individual.

=== Early Romantic writings ===
Hegel's earliest writings on Christianity date between 1783 and 1800. He was still working out his ideas at this time, and everything from this period was abandoned as fragments or unfinished drafts. (Note: In English these writings, published after Hegel's death, are collected in a translation by T. M. Knox under the title Early Theological Writings (1971).) Hegel was very much dissatisfied with the dogmatism and positivity (Note: As Hegel applies the term "positivity" to Christianity, "the word refers to non-essential, historically derived, and often authoritarian aspects of the religion; together, they contrast with its "natural," essential, moral, and freedom-nurturing quality. The "positivity" of Christianity refers to features of the religion that either obscure, or have mistakenly taken the place of, its essential moral message. "Hegel adopted the terms "positive" and "natural" from legal theory, where they indicate the difference between imperfect, human-written, secondary, "positive" law, and perfect, primary, God-given, "natural" law.") of the Christian religion, to which he opposed the spontaneous religion of the Greeks. In The Spirit of Christianity, he proposes a sort of resolution by aligning the universality of Kantian moral philosophy with the universality of the teachings of Jesus; in paraphrase: "The moral principle of the Gospel is charity, or love, and love is the beauty of the heart, a spiritual beauty which combines the Greek Soul and Kant's Moral Reason." Although he did not return to this Romantic formulation, the unification of Greek and Christian thought would remain a preoccupation throughout his life.

=== The Phenomenology of Spirit ===
Religion is a major theme throughout the 1807 Phenomenology of Spirit well before it emerges as the explicit topic of the penultimate Religion chapter. (Note: As documented, for instance, in di Giovanni 2009, pp. 226–45.) This is seen most directly in the metaphysical "unhappiness" of the Augustinian consciousness in chapter IV and in Hegel's depiction of the struggle of the Church of the Faithful with Enlightenment philosophes in chapter VI. (Note: See the corresponding section of Harris 1997 for discussion and defense of this historical identifications of the shapes of spirit presented by the Phenomenology. Whether or to what extent such identifications are important for the success of Hegel's project is a topic of ongoing scholarly debate.)

Hegel's proper account of Christianity, however, is to be found in the final section of the Phenomenology just prior to the closing chapter, Absolute Knowing. It is presented under the heading The Revelatory Religion [die offenbare Religion]. By means of philosophical exposition of Christian doctrines such as Incarnation and Resurrection, Hegel claims to demonstrate or to make "manifest" the conceptual truth of Christianity, and so to overcome what has only been positively revealed [geoffenbarte] by explication of its underlying, revelatory truth. (Note: This translation follows Harris 1995 and Harris 1997, and also accords with Hodgson's translational practice in the LPR: "For offenbar we have settled on "revelatory" in order to stress the process of "making open" or "becoming manifest" and thus to be able to distinguish offenbar from geoffenbart, which refers to something that has been "revealed" in historical, positive fashion. Hegel clearly intended a distinction as well as a relation between these terms (see 1827 lectures, p. 252). In the Phenomenology of Spirit he described Christianity as Die offenbare Religion, whereas in the Encyclopedia of Philosophical Sciences he titled it Die geoffenbarte Religion; thus the usage in the philosophy-of-religion lectures indicates a return to the earlier (and more suggestive) title. In some contexts we translate offenbar as "manifest," but for the title we prefer a term that also suggests the connection with geoffenbart and maintains whatever distinction Hegel may have intended between offenbaren and manifestieren.")

The heart of Hegel's interpretation of Christianity can be seen in his interpretation of the Trinity. God the Father must give Himself existence as finitely human Son, the death of whom discloses His essential being as Spirit – and, crucially, according to Hegel, his [Hegel's] own philosophical concept of spirit makes transparent what is only obscurely represented in the Christian concept of the Trinity. And so it makes manifest the philosophical truth of religion, which now is known.

In an essay on the Phenomenology, George di Giovanni contrasts Kant's rational faith (Note: "I cannot even assume God, freedom and immortality for the sake of the necessary practical use of my reason unless I simultaneously deprive speculative reason of its pretension to extravagant insights; because in order to attain to such insights, speculative reason would have to help itself to principles that in fact reach only to objects of possible experience, and which, if they were to be applied to what cannot be an object of experience, then they would always actually transform it into an appearance, and thus declare all practical extension of pure reason to be impossible. Thus I had to deny knowledge in order to make room for faith; and the dogmatism of metaphysics, i.e., the prejudice that without criticism reason can make progress in metaphysics, is the true source of all unbelief conflicting with morality, which unbelief is always very dogmatic.") with Hegel's rational religion. On his view, the modern role of religion consists in "expressing and nurturing spirit in its most individual forms" rather than in explaining reality. There is no longer any place for faith in opposition to knowledge. Instead, faith assumes such forms as the trust placed "in individuals close to us, or in the time and place in which we happen to live."

In other words, according to Hegel's philosophical interpretation, Christianity does not require faith in any doctrine that is not fully justified by reason. What is left, then, is the religious community, free to minister to individual needs and to celebrate the absolute freedom of spirit.

=== Berlin lectures ===
Hegel's Encyclopedia includes a section on the Revealed Religion, but it is quite short. It is his Berlin Lectures that contain his next presentation of Christianity, which he variously refers to as the "consummate", "absolute", or "revelatory" religion (all equivalent terms in this context). Transcripts of three of Hegel's four courses have been preserved, and they show him to be continually adjusting his emphases and exposition. (Note: These changes are documented in the Introductions to Peter C. Hodgson's three-volume translation of the critical edition of the Lectures (University of California Press).) The interpretation of Christianity that he advances, however, is still very much that which he presented in the Phenomenology – only now he is able to expound at greater length and with greater clarity upon what he had covered earlier in such a condensed fashion. (Note: For detailed accounts of this development see, for instance, Fackenheim 1967, ch. 5, or Jaeschke 1990, ch. 2–3.)

=== Issues of interpretation ===
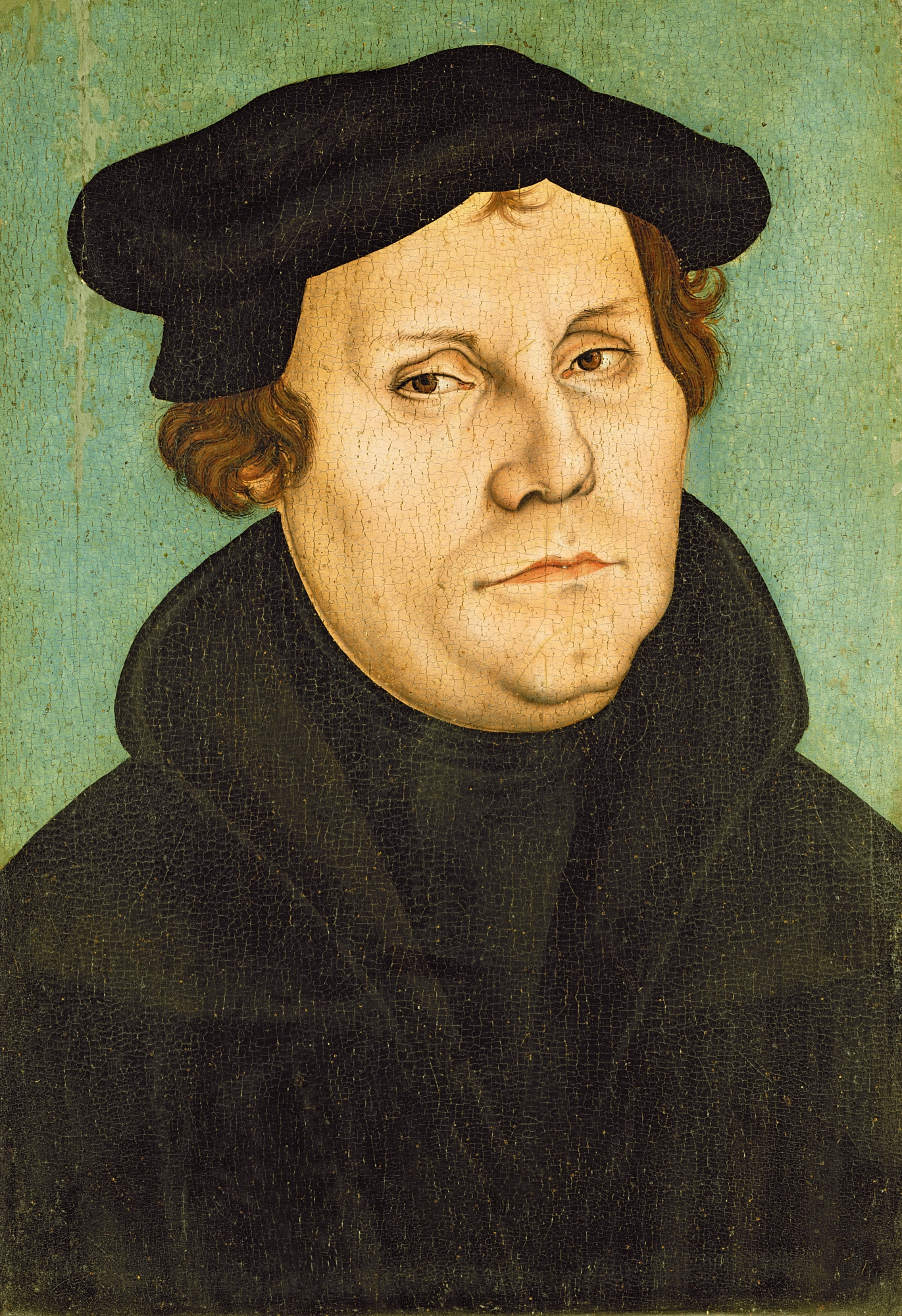
Martin Luther (1483–1546), who would not likely have recognized Hegel's claim to share his theology

Walter Jaeschke questions whether Luther would have recognized Hegel's claim to Protestantism. Hegel embraces the doctrine of the priesthood of all believers with his concept of spirit, but rejects the core Lutheran doctrines of sola gratia and sola scriptura. Instead, he affirms as the "fundamental principle" of Protestantism "the obstinacy that does honor to mankind, to refuse to recognize in conviction anything not ratified by thought." On similar grounds, Frederick Beiser, while acknowledging Hegel's apparently sincere profession of Lutheranism, describes Hegel's theology as effectively "the very opposite of Luther's."

Discussing the "Hegel Renaissance" in late 20th-century Anglo-American philosophy, Beiser expresses surprise – given today's highly secular academic culture – at such a surge of interest in Hegel. For, according to Hegel, the divine is the centerpoint of philosophy. Hegel's concept of God differs from theistic conceptions found in orthodox Christianity and from deistic conceptions suggested by eighteenth-century philosophers. Nonetheless, Hegel conceptualizes God as the infinite or absolute, in agreement with the classical definition given by St. Anselm as "that of which nothing greater can be conceived."

Just how to most properly characterize Hegel's distinctive articulation of Christianity was a matter of intense debate even in his own life and, among his students, after his death. Neither theistic, nor deistic, Hegel's god can only be articulated in the philosophical terms of the concept of spirit or his own distinctive logical vocabulary. Nevertheless, Hegel everywhere insists that his is the Christian God.

== Philosophy of history ==
"History", Frederick Beiser writes, "is central to Hegel's conception of philosophy". Philosophy is only possible "if it is historical, only if the philosopher is aware of the origins, context, and development of his doctrines." In this 1993 essay "Hegel's Historicism", Beiser declares this to be "nothing less than a revolution in the history of philosophy." In a 2011 monograph, however, Beiser excludes Hegel from his treatment of the German historicist tradition for the reason that Hegel is more interested in the philosophy of history than in the epistemological project of justifying its status as a science. Moreover, against the relativistic implications of historicism narrowly construed, Hegel's metaphysics of spirit supplies a telos, internal to history itself, in terms of which progress can be measured and assessed. This is the self-consciousness of freedom. The more that awareness of this essential freedom of spirit permeates a culture, the more advanced Hegel claims it to be.

Because freedom, according to Hegel, is the essence of spirit, the developing self-awareness of this is just as much a development in truth as it is in political life. Thinking presupposes an "instinctive belief" in truth, and the history of philosophy, as recounted by Hegel, is a progressive sequence of "system-identifying" concepts of truth.

Whether or not Hegel is a historicist simply depends upon how one defines the term. The importance of history in Hegel's philosophy, however, cannot be denied.

German has two words for "history", Historie and Geschichte. The first refers to "the narrative organization of empirical material". The second "includes an account of the underlying developmental logic (the 'intrinsic ground') of deeds and events". Only the latter procedure can supply a properly universal or philosophical history, and this is the procedure Hegel adopts in all of his historical writings. According to Hegel, humans are distinctly historical creatures because, not only do they exist in time, they also internalize temporal events so that they become, in a profound sense, part of what and who people are, "integral to humanity's self-understanding and self-knowledge." This is why the history of philosophy, for instance, is integral to philosophy itself, it being literally impossible for early philosophers to think what later philosophers, afforded all the riches of their predecessors, could think – and perhaps, with this distance, work through more thoroughly or consistently. From a later perspective, for instance, it becomes apparent that the concept of personhood includes the implication of universality of such a kind as to render contradictory any interpretation or implementation that extends it to some people, but not to others.

In the Introduction to his Lectures on the Philosophy of World History, simplifying his own account, Hegel divides human history into three epochs. In what he calls the "Oriental" world, one person (the pharaoh or emperor) was free. In the Greco-Roman world, some people (moneyed citizens) were free. In the "Germanic" world (that is, European Christendom) all persons are free.

In his discussion of the ancient world, Hegel provides a heavily qualified defense of slavery. As he puts it elsewhere, "slavery occurs in a transitional phase between the natural human existence and the truly ethical condition; it occurs in a world where a wrong is still right. Here, the wrong is valid, so that the position it occupies is a necessary one." Hegel is clear, however, that there is an unconditional moral demand to reject the institution of slavery, and that slavery is incompatible with the rational state and the essential freedom of every individual.

Some commentators – most notably, Alexandre Kojève and Francis Fukuyama – have understood Hegel to claim that, having achieved a fully universal concept of freedom, history is complete, that it has reached its conclusion. Against this, however, it can be objected that freedom may yet be expanded in terms both of its scope and its content. Since Hegel's day, the scope of the concept of freedom has been expanded to acknowledge the rightful inclusion of women, formerly enslaved or colonized peoples, the mentally ill, and those who do not conform to conservative norms with respect to sexual preference or gender identity, among others. As to the content of freedom, the United Nations' International Bill of Human Rights (for example) expands the concept of freedom beyond what Hegel himself articulates. Additionally, although Hegel consistently presents his philosophical histories as East-to-West narratives, scholars such as J. M. Fritzman argue that, not only is this prejudice quite incidental to the substance of Hegel's philosophical position, but that – with India now the world's largest democracy, for instance, or with South Africa's mighty efforts to transcend apartheid – the movement of freedom back to the East may already have begun.

== Dialectics, speculation, idealism ==
Hegel is often credited with proceeding according to a "dialectical method"; in point of fact, however, Hegel characterizes his philosophy as "speculative" (spekulativ), rather than dialectical, and uses the term "dialectical" only "quite rarely". (Note: "Because Hegel does not often use the word "dialectic" indicate the positive side of rationality, the predicate "dialectical" is less appropriate to characterize Hegel's entire method. His own use is closer to the ancient and Kantian meaning of dialectica than to the post-Marxian use; most often, it is reserved for the negative moment, whereas he prefers "speculative" characterize the complete and true nature of thought. Cf., e.g., Enc C 79 & R. [Hegel 1991b, §79&R]. "A rigorous justification of Hegel's method is given in the last chapter of his Logic, GW 12, pp. 237–253 [Hegel 2010b, pp. 736–53]. In the courses on the philosophy of right, Dialeklik is mentioned, e.g., in Ilt 3, 139 [no English translation] ("dialectics means in general that something finite pretends to be, though it is not insofar as it has its limit in itself") and Wa 273 [no English translation] ("all that is limited, is dialectical in itself"). Failure to see that Hegel does not stop at the second, intellectual, and (negative-)dialectical stage of knowledge leads to a reading that is more Kantian than Hegelian. Reluctance to recognize that the oppositions between, e.g., idea and nature or substance and subject, are only provisional and not yet fully true leads to a misunderstanding of Hegel's concepts of spirit and absolute spirit, and consequently to fundamental distortions of his theory and practice of philosophy itself.") This is because, although "Dialektik sometimes stands for the entire movement of the self-articulation of meaning or thought, this term refers more specifically to the self-negation of the determinations of the understanding (Verstand), when they are thought through in their fixedness and opposition."

By contrast, "Hegel describes correct thinking as the methodical interplay of three moments[:]

(a) abstract and intellectual (verständig),
(b) dialectical or negatively rational (negativvernünftig), and
(c) speculative or positively rational (positivvernünftig)." (Note: With respect to terminology, Hegel follows Kant (who roughly follows Plato) in defining the activity of thought (Denken) as directed towards what appears as other to itself as "understanding" or "intellect" (Verstand) and the activity of thought as directed upon its own activities as "reason" (Vernunft), which, in contrast to understanding, is speculative. Because Spekulation "sublates the opposition between subjectivity and objectivity, along with other oppositions," Hegel insists, it is not (merely) subjective.) (Note: "It is tempting to think of these logical operations as distinctively Hegelian. But they can be found elsewhere. In the first place, understanding is the process of conceptual analysis – of getting concepts and their use appropriately defined. In the second place, Carnap and Ryle, in their discussion of category terms, identify the way in which the negation of a term refers to its contrary, not its contradictory; the opposites share a common perspective. In many of Plato's dialogues, as well, a thorough examination of a definition leads to the opposite of what was originally intended. In the third place, theory construction responds to paradoxes and anomalies by developing explanations or grounds that can do justice to all the aspects involved. "In ordinary reflection, however, these operations function in isolation. Once understanding fixes its terms, it stops thinking and simply holds to the distinctions made. The paradoxes in Plato's dialogues are not ultimately resolved, and the modem theory of categories is simply a way of dispelling paradoxes. Theory construction, divorced from the discipline of understanding and the awareness that anomalies develop out of inherent limitations, becomes pure fantasy and loses its tie with reality. "For Hegel, rational thinking involves integrating all three operations into a single complex process of thinking.")

For example, self-consciousness is "the concept that consciousness has of itself. Thus in this case concept and referent coincide:... 'self-consciousness' refers to mind's taking on the self-contradictory (and thus also self-negating) role of being subject and object of one and the same act of cognition – simultaneously and in the same respect." Hence it is a speculative concept.

According to Beiser, "if Hegel has any methodology at all, it appears to be an anti-methodology, a method to suspend all methods." Hegel's term "dialectic" must be understood with reference to the concept of the object of investigation. What must be grasped is "the 'self-organization' of the subject matter, its 'inner necessity' and 'inherent movement.'" Hegel renounces all external methods such as could be "applied" to some subject matter.

The dialectical character of Hegel's speculative procedure often makes his position on any given issue quite difficult to characterize. Instead of seeking to answer a question or solve a problem directly, he frequently recasts it by showing, for instance, "how the dichotomy underlying the dispute is false, and that it is therefore possible to integrate elements from both positions." Speculative thought preserves what is true from apparently opposing theories in a process that Hegel terms "sublation".

To "sublate" (aufheben) has three main senses: (Note: While widely regarded as a technical Hegelian term, "Aufhebung (sublate) is a common German word for quotidian activities (such as conserving something for later use), for physical phenomena, and for logical operations." Although, according to the OED, "sublate" did enter the English language in the mid-sixteenth century, the more common word closest to Hegel's meaning is probably "suspend"–provided only that it is not taken to have any implications of temporariness, which Hegel's concept of Aufhebung does not.)

- 'to raise, to hold, lift up';
- 'to annul, abolish, destroy, cancel, suspend'; and,
- 'to keep, save, preserve.'

Hegel generally uses the term in all three senses, with particular emphasis on the second and third, in which apparent contradictions are speculatively overcome. His word for what is sublated is "moment" (das Moment, in the neuter), which denotes "an essential feature or aspect of a whole conceived as a static system, and an essential phase in a whole conceived as a dialectical movement or process." (When Hegel describes something as "contradictory," what he means is that it is not independently self-sustaining on its own terms, and so it can only be comprehended [begreifen] as a moment of a larger whole.)

According to Hegel, to think of the finite as a moment of the whole, rather than an independently self-determined existent, is what it means to grasp it as idealized (das Ideelle). Idealism, then, "is the doctrine that finite entities are ideal (ideell): they depend not on themselves for their existence but on some larger self-sustaining entity [i.e., the whole] that underlies or embraces them."

The pronoun-expressions – moment, sublate, and idealize – are characteristic of Hegel's account of idealism. They can be understood as stages of thought in which the "object is conceptually present first in mere adumbration, then according to circumstances both internal and external to it, and finally standing completely on its own." This phenomenological and conceptual analysis distinguishes Hegel's idealism from Kant's transcendental idealism and Berkeley's mentalistic idealism. In contrast to those positions, Hegel's idealism is entirely compatible with realism and non-mechanistic naturalism. This position rejects empiricism as an a priori account of knowledge, but it is in no way opposed to the philosophical legitimacy of empirical knowledge. Hegel's idealistic contention, which he claims to demonstrate, is that being itself is rational.

Although it is not incorrect to refer to Hegel's philosophy as "absolute idealism", this term was at the time more associated with Schelling, and Hegel himself is documented as employing it with reference to his own philosophy only three times.

According to Hegel, "every philosophy is essentially idealism." This claim is based on the assumption, which Hegel claims to demonstrate, that conceptualization is present at all cognitive levels. For to completely deny this would undermine trust in the conceptual capacities necessary for objective knowledge—and so would lead to total skepticism. Hence, according to Robert Stern, Hegel's idealism, "amounts to a form of conceptual realism, understood as 'the belief that concepts are part of the structure of reality.'"

=== Thesis–antithesis–synthesis ===
This terminology, largely developed earlier by Fichte, was spread by Heinrich Moritz Chalybäus in accounts of Hegel's philosophy that have since been broadly discredited. Walter Kaufmann, for instance, reports:

Fichte introduced into German philosophy the three-step of thesis, antithesis, and synthesis, using these three terms. Schelling took up this terminology. Hegel did not. He never once used these three terms together to designate three stages in an argument or account in any of his books. And they do not help us understand his Phenomenology, his Logic, or his philosophy of history; they impede any open-minded comprehension of what he does by forcing it into a scheme which was available to him and which he deliberately spurned.

More modestly, it has been said that this account is "only a partial comprehension that requires correction". What it gets right is that, according to Hegel, "truth emerges from error" in the course of historical development in a way that implies a "holism in which partial truths are progressively corrected so that their one-sidedness is overcome." What it distorts is that such a description is possible only after the process has unfolded. The "thesis" and "antithesis" are not "alien" to one another. Inasmuch as there can be said to be such a "dialectical method," it is not an external one such as could be "applied" to some subject matter.

Similarly, Stephen Houlgate argues that, in whatever limited sense Hegel might be said to have a "method", it is a strictly immanent method; that is, it emerges from thoughtful immersion in the subject-matter itself. If this leads to dialectics, that is only because there is a contradiction in the object itself, not because of any external methodological procedure.

== Legacy ==
Hegel's influence on subsequent philosophical developments has been enormous. In late nineteenth- and early twentieth-century England, a school known as British idealism propounded a version of absolute idealism through direct engagement with Hegel's texts. Prominent members included J. M. E. McTaggart, R. G. Collingwood, and G. R. G. Mure. Separately, some philosophers such as Marx, Dewey, Derrida, Adorno, and Gadamer selectively developed Hegelian ideas into their own philosophical programs. Others developed or framed their positions in opposition to Hegel's system. These include, for instance, such diverse philosophers as Schopenhauer, Kierkegaard, Russell, G. E. Moore, and Foucault. In theology, Hegel's influence marks the work of Karl Barth and Dietrich Bonhoeffer. These names, however, constitute only a small sample of some of the more important figures who have developed their thought in engagement with the philosophy of Hegel.

=== Right and Left Hegelians and Marxism ===
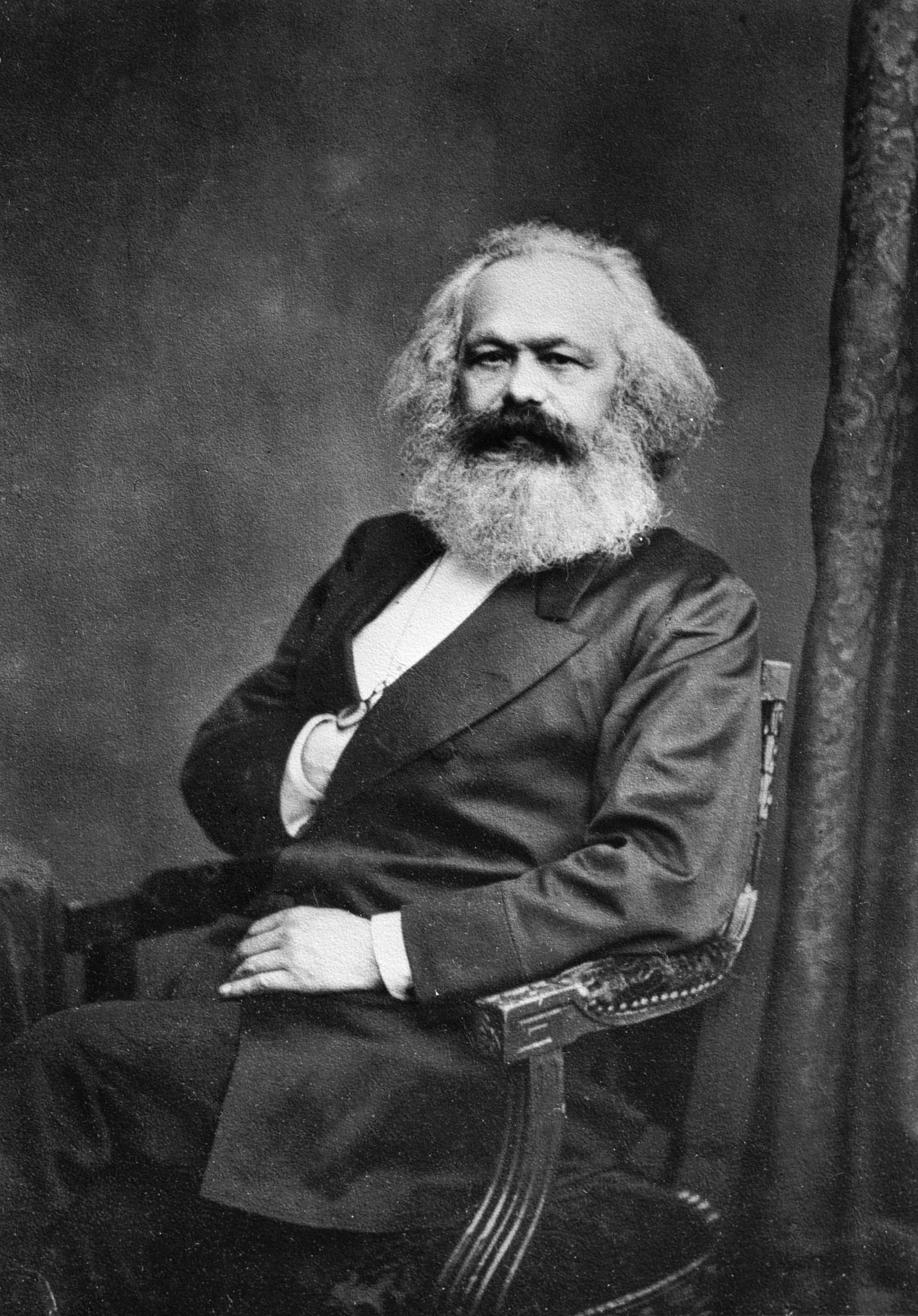
Karl Marx (1818–1883)

Some historians present Hegel's early influence in Germanic philosophy as divided into two opposing camps, right and left. The Right Hegelians, the allegedly direct disciples of Hegel at the University of Berlin, advocated a Protestant orthodoxy and the political conservatism of the post-Napoleon Restoration period. The Left Hegelians, also known as the Young Hegelians, interpreted Hegel in a revolutionary sense, leading to an advocation of atheism in religion and liberal democracy in politics. Recent studies, however, have questioned this paradigm.

The Right Hegelians "were quickly forgotten" and "are today mainly known only to specialists"; the Left Hegelians, by contrast, "included some of the most important thinkers of the period," and "through their emphasis on practice, some of these thinkers have remained exceedingly influential," primarily through the Marxist tradition.

Among the first followers to take an expressly critical view of Hegel's system were those in the 19th-century German group known as the Young Hegelians, which included Feuerbach, Marx, Engels, and their followers. The primary thrust of their criticism is concisely expressed in the eleventh of Marx's "Theses on Feuerbach" from his 1845 German Ideology: "The philosophers have only interpreted the world, in various ways; the point, however, is to change it." (Note: The literature on this is enormous. Herbert Marcuse's Reason and Revolution, however, is one classic introductory text.)

György Lukács' History and Class Consciousness (1923) helped reintroduce Hegel into the Marxist canon. With the rediscovery and re-evaluation of Hegel as a possible philosophical progenitor of Marxism by philosophically oriented Marxists, there was more recognition of the importance of Hegel's dialectical method and a resurgence of his historical perspective. A Hegelian-inflected interpretation of Marx was further developed in the work of critical theorists of the Frankfurt School.

=== In France ===
It has become commonplace to identify "French Hegel" with the lectures of Alexandre Kojève, who emphasized the master–servant [Herrschaft und Knechtschaft] dialectic (which he mistranslated as master–slave [maître et l'esclave]) and Hegel's philosophy of history. This perspective, however, overlooks over sixty years of French writing on Hegel, according to which Hegelianism was identified with the "system" presented in the Encyclopedia. The later reading, drawing instead upon the Phenomenology of Spirit, was in many ways a reaction against the earlier. After 1945, "this 'dramatic' Hegelianism, which centered on the theme of historical becoming through conflict, [came] to be seen as compatible with existentialism and Marxism."

By confining the dialectic to history, the dominant French readings of Jean Wahl, Alexandre Kojève, and Jean Hyppolite effectively presented Hegel as providing "a philosophical anthropology instead of a general metaphysics." This reading took the topic of desire as its focal point of intervention. A major theme was that "a reason that seeks to be all-inclusive falsifies reality by suppressing or repressing its 'other.'" Although it cannot be attributed entirely to Kojève, this reading of Hegel shaped the thought and interpretations of thinkers such as Jean-Paul Sartre, Maurice Merleau-Ponty, Claude Lévi-Strauss, Jacques Lacan, and Georges Bataille.

Kojève's interpretation of the "master–slave dialectic" as the basic model of historical development also influenced the feminism of Simone de Beauvoir and the anti-racist and anti-colonial work of Frantz Fanon.

=== American pragmatism ===
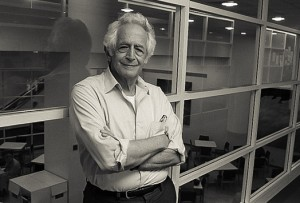
Richard J. Bernstein (1932–2022), known for his work on Hegel and American pragmatism

As documented by Richard J. Bernstein, the influence of Hegel on American pragmatism can be divided into three moments: the late nineteenth century, the mid-twentieth, and the present. The first is to be found in early issues of The Journal of Speculative Philosophy (founded 1867). The second is evident in the acknowledged influence upon major figures including John Dewey, Charles Peirce, and William James.

As Dewey himself describes the attraction, "There were, however, also 'subjective' reasons for the appeal that Hegel's thought made to me; it supplied a demand for unification that was doubtless an intense emotional craving, and yet was a hunger that only an intellectualized subject-matter could satisfy." Dewey accepted much of Hegel's account of history and society, but rejected his conception of Hegel's account of absolute knowing.

Two philosophers, John McDowell and Robert Brandom (sometimes referred to as the "Pittsburgh Hegelians"), constitute, per Bernstein, the third moment of Hegel's influence on pragmatism. However, while openly acknowledging the influence, neither claims to explicate Hegel's views according to his own self-understanding. (Note: For instance, in the Introduction to his A Spirit of Trust, Brandom repeatedly goes out of his way to emphasize that his interpretation is, e.g., "unusual" and "an admitted anachronism" and that his procedure is "not Hegel's own practice.") In addition, each is avowedly influenced by Wilfrid Sellars. McDowell is particularly interested in dispelling the "myth of the given", the dichotomy between concept and intuition, whereas Brandom is concerned mostly to develop Hegel's social account of reason-giving and normative implication. These appropriations of Hegel's thought are two among several "non-metaphysical" readings.

== Publications and other writings ==
Published articles are in quotes; book titles are italicized. (Note: List, since emended for this Wikipedia article, originally compiled for The Bloomsbury Companion to Hegel (pp. 341–43) by Kenneth R. Westphal.)

Berne, 1793–96

- 1793–94: 'Fragments on Folk Religion and Christianity'
- 1795: 'Life of Jesus'
- 1795–96: 'The Positivity of the Christian Religion'
- 1796–97: 'The Oldest Systematic Program of German Idealism' (authorship disputed)

Frankfurt am Main, 1797–1800

- 1797–98: 'Drafts on Religion and Love'
- 1798: Confidential Letters on the Prior Constitutional Relations of the Wadtlandes (Pays de Vaud) to the City of Bern. A Complete Disclosure of the Previous Oligarchy of the Bern Estates. Translated from the French of a Deceased Swiss [Jean Jacques Cart], with Commentary. Frankfurt am Main, Jäger. (Hegel's translation is published anonymously)
- 1798–1800: 'The Spirit of Christianity and its Fate'
- 1800–02: 'The Constitution of Germany' (draft)

Jena, 1801–07

- 1801: De Orbitis Planetarum; 'The Difference between Fichte's and Schelling's System of Philosophy'
- 1802: 'On the Essence of Philosophical Critique in General and its Relation to the Present State of Philosophy in Particular' (Introduction to the Critical Journal of Philosophy, edited by Schelling and Hegel)
- 1802: 'How Commonsense takes Philosophy, Illustrated by the Works of Mr. Krug'
- 1802 'The Relation of Scepticism to Philosophy. Presentation of its various Modifications and Comparison of the latest with the ancient'
- 1802: 'Faith and Knowledge, or the Reflective Philosophy of Subjectivity in the Completeness of its Forms as Kantian, Jacobian and Fichtean Philosophy'
- 1802–03: 'System of Ethical Life'
- 1803: 'On the Scientific Approaches to Natural Law, its Role within Practical Philosophy and its Relation to the Positive Sciences of Law'
- 1803–04: 'First Philosophy of Spirit (Part III of the System of Speculative Philosophy 1803/4)'
- 1807: The Phenomenology of Spirit

Bamberg, 1807–08

- 1807: 'Preface: On Scientific Cognition' – Preface to his Philosophical System, published with the Phenomenology

Nuremberg, 1808–16

- 1808–16: 'Philosophical Propaedeutic'

Heidelberg, 1816–18

- 1812–13: Science of Logic, Part 1 (Books 1, 2)
- 1816: Science of Logic, Part 2 (Book 3)
- 1817: 'Review of Friedrich Heinrich Jacobi's Works, Volume Three'
- 1817: 'Assessment of the Proceedings of Estates Assembly of the Duchy of Württemberg in 1815 and 1816'
- 1817: Encyclopaedia of Philosophical Sciences, 1st edition

Berlin, 1818–31

- 1820: Elements of the Philosophy of Right, or Natural Law and Political Science in Outline
- 1827: Encyclopaedia of Philosophical Sciences, 2nd rev. edn.
- 1831: Science of Logic, 2nd edn, with extensive revisions to Book 1 (published in 1832)
- 1831: Encyclopaedia of Philosophical Sciences, 3rd rev. edn

=== Berlin lecture series ===
- Logic 1818–31: annually
- Philosophy of Nature: 1819–20, 1821–22, 1823–24, 1825–26, 1828, 1830
- Philosophy of Subjective Spirit: 1820, 1822, 1825, 1827–28, 1829–30
- Philosophy of Right: 1818–19, 1819–20, 1821–22, 1822–23, 1824–25, 1831
- Philosophy of World History: 1822–23, 1824–25, 1826–27, 1828–29, 1830–31
- Philosophy of Art: 1820–21, 1823, 1826, 1828–29
- Philosophy of Religion: 1821, 1824, 1827, 1831
- History of Philosophy: 1819, 1820–21, 1823–24, 1825–26, 1827–28, 1829–30, 1831

== See also ==
- Philosophical theory of everything

== Sources ==
=== Primary ===
- Hegel, Georg Wilhelm Friedrich (1970). Michael John Petry (ed.). Hegel's Philosophy of Nature. Translated by Petry, Michael John. Allen & Unwin.
- Hegel, Georg Wilhelm Friedrich (1971). Early Theological Writings. Translated by Knox, T. M. Chicago University Press.
- Hegel, Georg Wilhelm Friedrich (1975a). Aesthetics: Lectures on Fine Art. Translated by Knox, T. M. Oxford University Press.
- Hegel, Georg Wilhelm Friedrich (1975b). H. B. Nisbet (ed.). Lectures on the Philosophy of World History: Introduction. Translated by Nisbet, H. B. Cambridge University Press.
- Hegel, Georg Wilhelm Friedrich (1978). Michael John Petry (ed.). Hegel's Philosophy of Subjective Spirit. Translated by Petry, Michael John. D. Reidel Pub. Co.
- Hegel, Georg Wilhelm Friedrich (1984a). H. S. Harris and W. Cerf (ed.). The Difference Between Fichte's and Schelling's System of Philosophy. Translated by Harris, H. S.; Cerf, W. SUNY Press.
- Hegel, Georg Wilhelm Friedrich (1984b). Hodgson, P.C.; Brown, R.F.; Stewart, J.M. (eds.). Lectures on the Philosophy of Religion. Translated by Hodgson, P. C.; Brown, R. F.; Stewart, J. M. with the assistance of J.P. Fitzer and H. S. Harris. University of California Press.
- Hegel, Georg Wilhelm Friedrich (1984c). Clark Butler and Christiane Seiler (ed.). The Letters. Indiana University Press.
- Hegel, Georg Wilhelm Friedrich (1998). H. S. Harris and W. Cerf (ed.). Faith and Knowledge. Translated by Harris, H. S.; Cerf, W. SUNY Press.
- Hegel, Georg Wilhelm Friedrich (1990). "Encyclopedia of the Philosophical Sciences in Outline [1917]". In Ernst Behler (ed.). Encyclopedia of the Philosophical Sciences in Outline, and Other Philosophical Writings. Translated by Taubeneck, Steven A. Continuum.
- Hegel, Georg Wilhelm Friedrich (1991a). H. B. Nisbet (ed.). Elements of the Philosophy of Right. Translated by Nisbet, H. B. Cambridge University Press.
- Hegel, Georg Wilhelm Friedrich (1991b). Suchting, W. A.; Geraets, Théodore F.; Harris, H. S. (eds.). The Encyclopaedia Logic: Part I of the Encyclopaedia of Philosophical Sciences with the Zusätze. Translated by Suchting, W. A.; Geraets, Théodore F.; Harris, H. S. Hackett.
- Hegel, Georg Wilhelm Friedrich (1995). Haldane, E. S.; Simson, Frances H. (eds.). Lectures on the History of Philosophy. Translated by Haldane, E. S.; Simson, Frances H. University of Nebraska Press.
- Hegel, Georg Wilhelm Friedrich (1996). "The Oldest Systematic Programme of German Idealism". In Frederick C. Beiser (ed.). The Early Political Writings of the German Romantics. Cambridge University Press. [authorship disputed]
- Hegel, Georg Wilhelm Friedrich (2010a). Michael J. Inwood (ed.). The Philosophy of Mind. Translated by Inwood, Michael J.; Miller, Arnold V. Oxford University Press.
- Hegel, Georg Wilhelm Friedrich (2010b). George di Giovanni (ed.). The Science of Logic. Translated by di Giovanni, George. Cambridge University Press.
- Hegel, Georg Wilhelm Friedrich (2010c). Lectures on Natural Right and Political Science: The First Philosophy of Right. Translated by Stewart, J. Michael; Hodgson, Peter C. Oxford University Press.
- Hegel, Georg Wilhelm Friedrich (2011). Ruben Alvarado (ed.). Lectures on the History of Philosophy. Translated by Alvarado, Aalten. Wordbridge Publishing.
- Hegel, Georg Wilhelm Friedrich (2018). Terry Pinkard (ed.). The Phenomnology of Spirit. Translated by Pinkard, Terry. Cambridge University Press.

=== Secondary ===
- "100 Years Carnegie: Hegel: Did you know...?". Bucknell University.
- Baugh, Bruce (2003). French Hegel: From Surrealism to Postmodernism. Routledge. ISBN 978-1-317-82772-6.
- Beiser, Frederick C. (1993a). The Fate of Reason: German Philosophy from Kant to Fichte. Harvard University Press. ISBN 9780674020696.
- Beiser, Frederick C. (1993b). "Hegel's Historicism". In Frederick C. Beiser (ed.). The Cambridge Companion to Hegel. Cambridge University Press. ISBN 9780521387118.
- Beiser, Frederick C. (2005). Hegel. Routledge.
- Beiser, Frederick C. (2008). "Introduction: The Puzzling Hegel Renaissance". In Frederick C. (ed.). The Cambridge Companion to Hegel and Nineteenth-Century Philosophy. Cambridge University Press.
- Beiser, Frederick C. (2011). The German Historicist Tradition. Oxford University Press. ISBN 978-0-19-969155-5.
- Bernstein, Richard J. (2010). The Pragmatic Turn. Polity Press.
- Bernstein, Richard J. (2023). The Vicissitudes of Nature. Polity Press.
- Bohman, James (2021), Critical Theory, The Stanford Encyclopedia of Philosophy (Spring 2021 ed.)
- Brandom, Robert B. (2019). A Spirit of Trust: A Reading of Hegel's Phenomenology of Spirit. Belknap Press of Harvard University Press.
- Bubner, Rüdiger (2007). "The Religion of Art". In Stephen Houlgate (ed.). Hegel and the Arts. Northwestern University Press.
- Burbidge, John (1993). "Hegel's Conception of Logic". In Frederick C. Beiser (ed.). The Cambridge Companion to Hegel. Cambridge University Press.
- Burbidge, John (2006a). "New Directions in Hegel's Philosophy of Nature". In Katerina Deligiorgi (ed.). In Hegel: New Directions. McGill-Queen's University Press.
- Burbidge, John (2006b). The Logic of Hegel's 'Logic': An Introduction. Broadview Press.
- Butler, Judith (1987). Subjects of Desire: Hegelian Reflections in Twentieth-Century France. Columbia University Press.
- Carter, Ian (2022), Positive and Negative Liberty, The Stanford Encyclopedia of Philosophy (Spring 2022 ed.)
- Chalybäus, Heinrich Moritz (1860). Historische Entwicklung der spekulativen Philosophie von Kant bis Hegel. Leipzig: Arnold.
- Collins, Ardis B. (2013). "The Introductions to the System". In Allegra de Laurentiis and Jeffrey Edwards (ed.). The Bloomsbury Companion to Hegel. Bloomsbury Academic.
- Cowley, Stephen (2016). "Hegel in Berlin – Jacques D'Hondt".
- Croce, Benedetto (1915). What Is Living and What Is Dead of the Philosophy of Hegel. Macmillan.
- D'Hondt, Jacques (1968). Hegel en son temps (Berlin, 1818–1831). Éditions Sociales.
- de Laurentiis, Allegra (2005). "Metaphysical Foundations of the History of Philosophy: Hegel's 1820 Introduction to the Lectures on the History of Philosophy". Review of Metaphysics. 41 (3): 3–31.
- de Laurentiis, Allegra (2009). "Absolute Knowing". In Kenneth R. Westphal (ed.). The Blackwell Guide to Hegel's Phenomenology of Spirit. Wiley-Blackwell.
- de Laurentiis, Allegra (2010). "Universal Historiography and World History According to Hegel". In Peter Liddel and Andrew Fear (ed.). Historiae Mundi: Studies in Universal History. Duckworth Press.
- de Laurentiis, Allegra (2021). Hegel's Anthropology: Life, Psyche, and Second Nature. Northwestern University Press.
- "Hegel: Rechtschreibung, Bedeutung, Definition". Duden (in German).
- Durant, Will (1962). The Story of Philosophy (4th ed.). Time Reading Program.
- Dien Winfield, Richard (1995). Systematic Aesthetics. University Press of Florida.
- Dien Winfield, Richard (2011). "Hegel's Solution to the Mind–Body Problem". In Stephen Houlgate and Michael Baur (ed.). A Companion to Hegel. Blackwell Publishing Ltd.
- deVries, William (2013). "Subjective Spirit: Soul, Consciousness, Intelligence and Will". In Allegra de Laurentiis and Jeffrey Edwards (ed.). The Bloomsbury Companion to Hegel. Bloomsbury Academic.
- Dewey, John (1981). J.J. McDermott (ed.). The Philosophy of John Dewey. University of Chicago Press.
- di Giovanni, George (2000). "Factual Necessity: On H. S. Harris and Weltgeist". The Owl of Minerva. 31 (2): 131. doi:10.5840/owl200031212.
- di Giovanni, George (2003). "Faith Without Religion, Religion Without Faith: Kant and Hegel on Religion". Journal of the History of Philosophy. 59 (1): 3–31.
- di Giovanni, George (2009). "Religion, History, and Spirit in Hegel's Phenomenology of Spirit". In Kenneth R. Westphal (ed.). The Blackwell Guide to Hegel's Phenomenology of Spirit. Wiley-Blackwell.
- di Giovanni, George (2010). "Introduction". The Science of Logic. Cambridge University Press.
- di Giovanni, George (2013). "Moment". In Allegra de Laurentiis and Jeffrey Edwards (ed.). The Bloomsbury Companion to Hegel. Bloomsbury Academic.
- Dickey, Laurence (1989). Hegel, Religion, Economics, and the Politics of Spirit 1770–1807. Cambridge University Press.
- Fackenheim, Emil L. (1967). The Religious Dimension of Hegel's Thought. Indiana University Press.
- Ferrarin, Alfredo (2007). Hegel and Aristotle. Cambridge University Press.
- Fritzman, J.M. (2014). Hegel. Polity.
- Guyer, Paul; Wood, Alan W. (1998), "Introduction to the Critique of Pure Reason [Editors' Introduction]", The Critique of Pure Reason, Cambridge University Press
- Harris, H.S. (1993). "Hegel's Intellectual Development to 1807". The Cambridge Companion to Hegel. Cambridge University Press.
- Harris, H.S. (1995). Phenomenology and System. Hackett.
- Harris, H.S. (1997). Hegel's Ladder. Hackett.
- Heine, Heinrich (1834). "Zur Geschichte der Religion und Philosophie in Deutschland". Der Salon von H. Heine Volume: Zweiter Band (Volume 2). Hoffmann und Campe.
- Henrich, Deiter (1979). "Art and Philosophy of Art Today: Reflections with Reference to Hegel". In Richard E. Amacher and Victor Lange (ed.). New Perspectives in German Literary Criticism: A Collection of Essays. Princeton University Press.
- Hentrup, Miles (2019). "Hegel's Logic as Presuppositionless Science". Idealistic Studies. 49 (2): 145–165. doi:10.5840/idstudies2019115107. S2CID 211921540.
- Hodgson, Peter C. (1985). "Editorial Introduction". Lectures on the Philosophy of Religion, v.3: The Consummate Religion. University of California Press.
- Hodgson, Peter C. (2008). "Hegel's Philosophy of Religion". In Frederick C. (ed.). The Cambridge Companion to Hegel and Nineteenth-Century Philosophy. Cambridge University Press.
- Houlgate, Stephen (2005). An introduction to Hegel: Freedom, Truth, and History (2nd ed.). Blackwell.
- Houlgate, Stephen (2006). The Opening of Hegel's Logic: From Being to Infinity. Purdue University Press.
- Houlgate, Stephen (2007). "Introduction". In Stephen Houlgate (ed.). Hegel and the Arts. Northwestern University Press.
- Houlgate, Stephen (2013). Hegel's Phenomenology of Spirit. Bloomsbury Academic.
- Houlgate, Stephen (2024). "Hegel's Aesthetics". The Stanford Encyclopedia of Philosophy (Spring 2024 ed.).
- Inwood, Michael (1992). A Hegel Dictionary. Wiley-Blackwell. ISBN 978-0631175339.
- Inwood, Michael J. (2013a). "Logic – Nature – Spirit". In Allegra de Laurentiis and Jeffrey Edwards (ed.). The Bloomsbury Companion to Hegel. Bloomsbury Academic.
- Inwood, Michael (2013b). "Reason and Understanding". In Allegra de Laurentiis and Jeffrey Edwards (ed.). The Bloomsbury Companion to Hegel. Bloomsbury Academic.
- Inwood, Michael (2018). "Editor's Introduction". The Phenomenology of Spirit. Oxford University Press.
- Jaeschke, Walter (1990). Reason in Religion: The Foundations of Hegel's Philosophy of Religion. University of California Press.
- Jaeschke, Walter (1993). "Christianity and Secularity in Hegel's Concept of the State". In Robert Stern (ed.). G. W. F. Hegel: Critical Assessments v. IV. Routledge.
- Jaeschke, Walter (2013). "Absolute Spirit: Art, Religion and Philosophy". In Allegra de Laurentiis and Jeffrey Edwards (ed.). The Bloomsbury Companion to Hegel. Bloomsbury Academic.
- Kant, Immanuel (1998). Paul Guyer and Allen W. Wood (ed.). Critique of Pure Reason. Cambridge University Press.
- Kaufmann, Walter (1959). Hegel: A Reinterpretation. Doubleday.
- Knox, T. M. (2022). "Georg Wilhelm Friedrich Hegel". Encyclopædia Britannica.
- Kroner, Richard (1971). "Introduction". Early Theological Writings. University of Pennsylvania Press.
- Longuenesse, Béatrice (2007). Hegel's Critique of Metaphysics. Cambridge University Press.
- Löwith, Karl (1964). From Hegel to Nietzsche. Columbia University Press.
- Magee, Glenn Alexander (2001). Hegel and the Hermetic Tradition. Cornell University Press. ISBN 0-8014-7450-7.
- Magee, Glenn Alexander (2011). The Hegel Dictionary. Continuum.
- Marcuse, Herbert (1999). Reason and Revolution (100th Anniversary ed.). Humanity Books.
- Marx, Karl (1978). "Theses On Feuerbach". In Robert C. Tucker (ed.). Marx-Engles Reader (2nd ed.). Norton.
- McTaggart, J. Ellis (1896). "Hegel's Theory of Punishment". International Journal of Ethics. 6 (4): 479–502. JSTOR 2375419.
- Moland, Lydia L. (1993). Hegel's Aesthetics: The Art of Idealism. Oxford University Press.
- Mueller, G.E. (1958). "The Hegel Legend of 'Thesis-Antithesis-Synthesis'". Journal of the History of Ideas. 19 (3): 411–414. doi:10.2307/2708045. JSTOR 2708045.
- Peperzak, Adriaan T. (2001). Modern Freedom: Hegel's Legal, Moral, and Political Philosophy. Kluwer Academic Publishers.
- Pinkard, Terry (2000). Hegel – A Biography. Cambridge University Press.
- Pippin, Robert (1993). "You Can't Get There from Here: Transition Problems in Hegel's Phenomenology of Spirit". In Frederick C. Beiser (ed.). The Cambridge Companion to Hegel. Cambridge University Press.
- Pippin, Robert (2008a). "The Absence of Aesthetics in Hegel's Aesthetics". In Frederick C. Beiser (ed.). The Cambridge Companion to Hegel and Nineteenth-Century Philosophy. Cambridge University Press.
- Pippin, Robert (2008b). "9. Institutional rationality". Hegel's Practical Philosophy: Rational Agency as Ethical Life. Cambridge University Press.
- Pippin, Robert (2019). Hegel's Realm of Shadows: Logic as Metaphysics in "The Science of Logic". University of Chicago Press.
- Pöggeler, Otto (2012). "Editorial Introduction". In J. Michael Stewart and Peter C. Hodgson (ed.). Lectures on Natural Right and Political Science: The First Philosophy of Right. Oxford University Press.
- Redding, Paul (2020). "Georg Wilhelm Friedrich Hegel: 1. Life, Work, and Influence". The Stanford Encyclopedia of Philosophy. Metaphysics Research Lab, Stanford University.
- "Hegel". Random House Webster's Unabridged Dictionary.
- Rockmore, Tom (1993). Before and after Hegel: A Historical Introduction to Hegel's Thought. University of California Press.
- Rockmore, Tom (2013). "Feuerbach, Bauer, Marx, and Marxisms". In Allegra de Laurentiis and Jeffrey Edwards (ed.). The Bloomsbury Companion to Hegel. Bloomsbury Academic.
- Rutter, Benjamin (2010). Hegel on the Modern Arts. Cambridge University Press.
- Siep, Ludwig (2021). Hegel's Phenomenology of Spirit. Cambridge University Press.
- Stahl, Titus (2021), Georg [György] Lukács, The Stanford Encyclopedia of Philosophy (Spring 2021 ed.)
- Stern, Robert (2002). Hegel and the 'Phenomenology of Spirit'. Routledge.
- Stern, Robert (2008). "Hegel's Idealism". In Frederick C. (ed.). The Cambridge Companion to Hegel and Nineteenth-Century Philosophy. Cambridge University Press.
- Stone, Alison (2005). Petrified Intelligence: Nature in Hegel's Philosophy. SUNY Press.
- Taylor, Charles (1975). Hegel. Cambridge University Press.
- Tor, Sara (29 November 2022). "Manuscript treasure trove may offer fresh understanding of Hegel". The Guardian.
- Wandschneider, Dieter (2013). "Philosophy of Nature". In Allegra de Laurentiis and Jeffrey Edwards (ed.). The Bloomsbury Companion to Hegel. Bloomsbury Academic.
- Wells, John C. (2008). Longman Pronunciation Dictionary (3rd ed.). Longman. ISBN 9781405881180.
- Westphal, Kenneth (1993). "The basic context and structure of Hegel's Philosophy of Right". In Frederick C. Beiser (ed.). The Cambridge Companion to Hegel. Cambridge University Press.
- Westphal, Kenneth (2008). "Philosophizing about Nature: Hegel's Philosophical Project". In Frederick C. Beiser (ed.). The Cambridge Companion to Hegel and Nineteenth-Century Philosophy. Cambridge University Press.
- Westphal, Kenneth (2013). "Objective Spirit: Right, Morality, Ethical Life and World History". In Allegra de Laurentiis and Jeffrey Edwards (ed.). The Bloomsbury Companion to Hegel. Bloomsbury Academic.
- Wicks, Robert L. (1993). "Hegel's Aesthetics: An Overview". In Frederick C. Beiser (ed.). The Cambridge Companion to Hegel. Cambridge University Press.
- Wicks, Robert L. (2020). Simply Hegel. Simply Charly.
- Wolff, Michael (2013). "Science of Logic". In Allegra de Laurentiis and Jeffrey Edwards (ed.). The Bloomsbury Companion to Hegel. Bloomsbury Academic.
- Wood, Allen W. (1990). "Editor's Introduction". In H.B. Nisbet (ed.). Elements of the Philosophy of Right. Cambridge University Press.
- Wood, Allen W. (1991). Hegel's Ethical Thought. Cambridge University Press.
