= De Orbitis Planetarum =

The Dissertatio philosophica de orbitis planetarum (Philosophical Dissertation on the Orbits of the Planets) is the title of the work of with which Hegel in 1801 obtained his teaching license at the University of Jena.

In the text, Hegel argues that the solar system has five classical planets and that the space between Mars and Jupiter is empty. The book was condemned by the church authorities of the time. Shortly before publication, the dwarf planet Ceres had been discovered.
