= Realphilosophie =

Philosophical term coined by Hegel

The term Realphilosophie was first introduced by Georg Wilhelm Friedrich Hegel. His Jenaer Realphilosophie of 1805/6 contains lectures "on the philosophy of nature and of the spirit". Hegel confronts the material philosophy of pure logic: Realphilosophie is thus thinking on empirical basis. In his Realphilosophie, Hegel concerns himself, among other things, with phenomena found in astronomy and biology. However, Realphilosophie also includes social and cultural phenomena. It covers both natural philosophy and cultural philosophy.
