= Alfredo Ferrarin =

Italian philosophy professor

- Born: 1960 (age 65–66)

Academic background
- Education: Università di Pisa (M.A.); Scuola Normale Superiore di Pisa (PhD)
- Thesis: Hegel interprete di Aristotele (1990)
- Doctoral advisor: Remo Bodei
- Other advisor: Adriaan Peperzak

Academic work
- Era: Contemporary philosophy
- Region: Western philosophy
- School or tradition: German Idealism
- Institutions: Scuola Normale Superiore di Pisa

Alfredo Ferrarin (born 1960) is a professor of philosophy at the Scuola Normale Superiore di Pisa. He formerly was professor of philosophy at University of Pisa and Boston University.

== Life and work ==
Ferrarin's 2001 book Hegel and Aristotle has been reviewed by Angelica Nuzzo, Dermot Moran, Franco Trabattoni, L. De Vos and Helen S. Lang among others.

=== Selected publications ===
- Ferrarin, Alfredo (2001). Hegel and Aristotle. doi:10.1017/CBO9780511498107. ISBN 978-0-521-78314-9.
- Ferrarin, Alfredo (2019). Thinking and the I. Northwestern University Press. doi:10.2307/j.ctvdjrpkq. ISBN 978-0-8101-3939-8. JSTOR j.ctvdjrpkq.
- Ferrarin, Alfredo (2015). The Powers of Pure Reason. doi:10.7208/chicago/9780226243290.001.0001. ISBN 978-0-226-41938-1.

==== Editor ====
- Hegel and Phenomenology. Contributions to Phenomenology. Vol. 102. 2019. doi:10.1007/978-3-030-17546-7. ISBN 978-3-030-17545-0.
