= Burschenschaft =

Student association in some German-speaking cultures

Flag of the Urburschenschaft

A Burschenschaft (German: [ˈbʊʁʃn̩ʃaft]; sometimes abbreviated B! in the German Burschenschaft jargon; plural: B!B!) is one of the traditional Studentenverbindungen (student associations) of Germany, Austria, and Chile (the latter due to German cultural influence). Burschenschaften were founded in the 19th century as associations of university students inspired by liberal and nationalistic ideas. They were significantly involved in the March Revolution and the unification of Germany. After the formation of the German Empire in 1871, they faced a crisis, as their main political objective had been realized. So-called Reformburschenschaften were established, but these were dissolved by the Nazi regime in 1935/6. In West Germany, the Burschenschaften were re-established in the 1950s, but they faced a renewed crisis in the 1960s and 1970s, as the mainstream political outlook of the German student movement of that period started leaning more towards the left. Roughly 160 Burschenschaften exist today in Germany, Austria and Chile.

== History ==
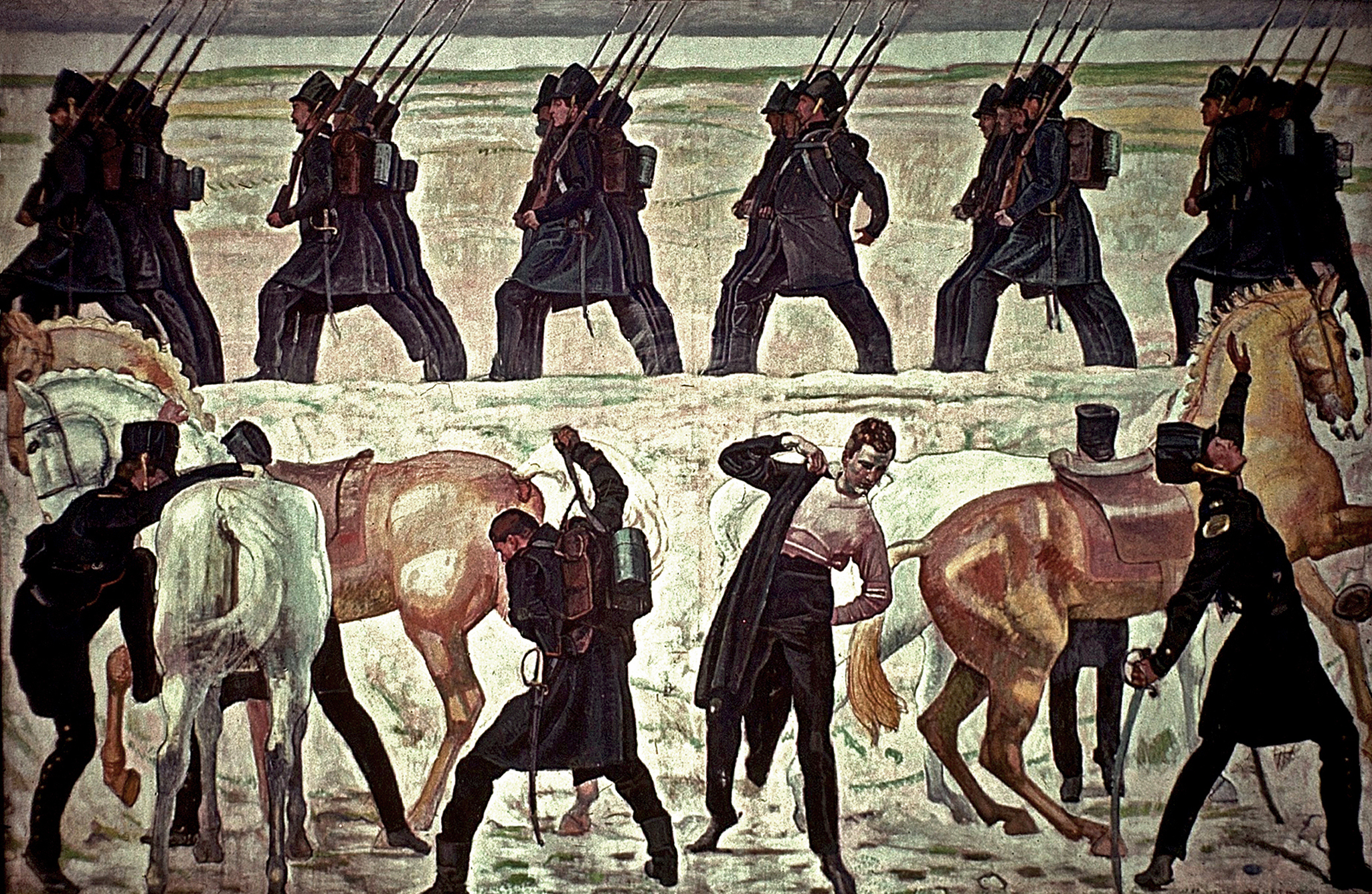
The Students of Jena Take to the Field in the War of Liberation, 1813 (Ferdinand Hodler, 1908–09)

=== Origins ===
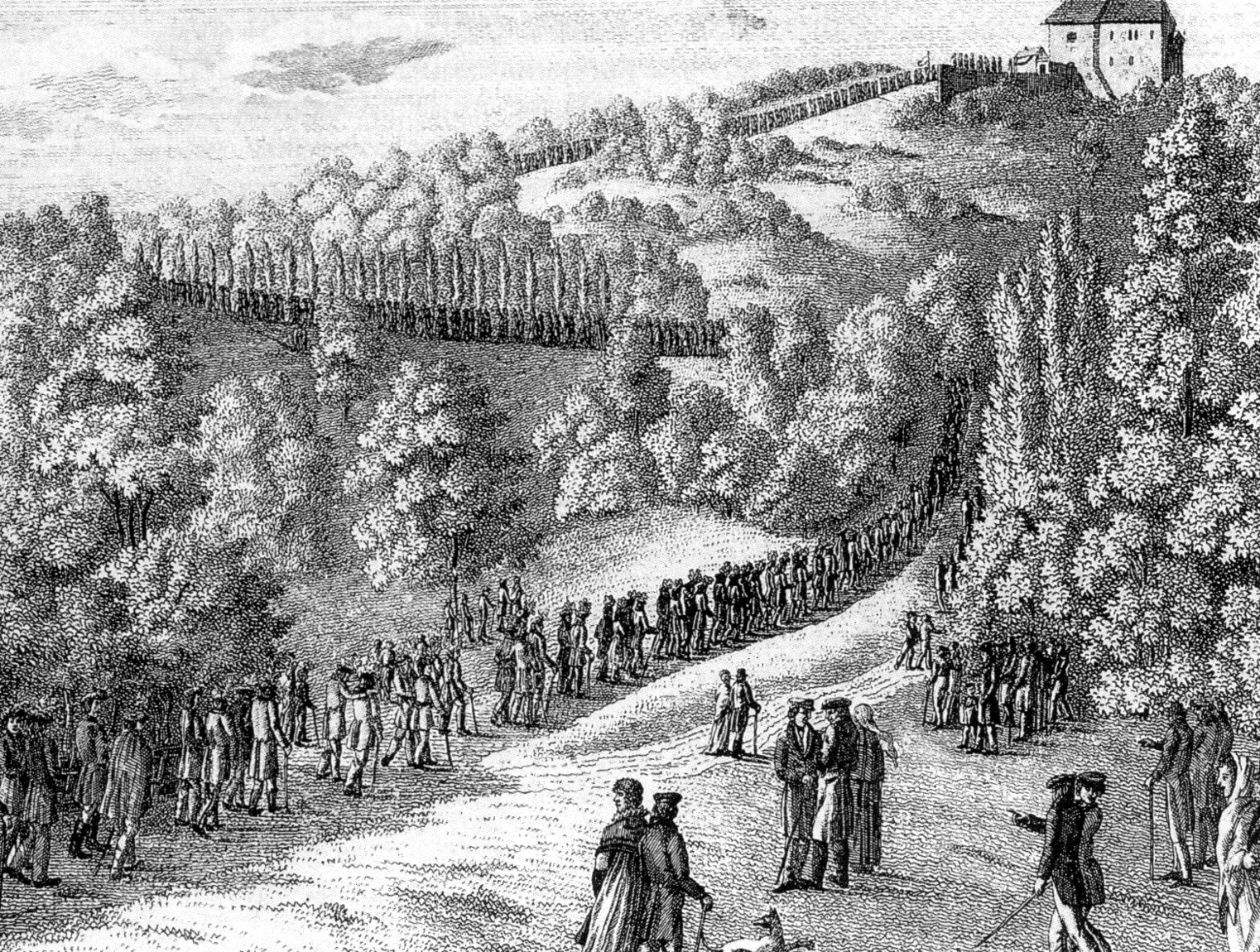
Wartburg festival of 1817

The very first one, called Urburschenschaft ("original Burschenschaft"), was founded on 12 June 1815 at Jena as an association drawn from all German university students inspired by liberal and patriotic ideas. Like the Landsmannschaften or the Corps, a student association based on particular German region, the Burschenschaft members also engaged in duelling. However, its main purpose was to break down society lines and to destroy rivalry in the student body, to improve student life and increase patriotism. It was intended to draw its members from a broader population base than the Corps. Indeed, the group was known for its middle-class membership while the Corps' was mainly aristocratic. At first, a significant component of its membership were students who had taken part in the German wars of liberation against the Napoleonic occupation of Germany.

Its motto was “honor, freedom, fatherland” (German: Ehre, Freiheit, Vaterland), and the original colors were red-black-red with a golden oak leaves cluster, which might be based on the uniform of the Lützow Free Corps, being a corps of volunteer soldiers during the wars of liberation.

=== 19th century ===
Gold thread embroidery around 1900 - German student fraternity

The Burschenschaften were student associations that engaged in numerous social activities. However, their most important goal was to foster loyalty to the concept of a united German national state as well as strong engagement for freedom, rights, and democracy. Quite often Burschenschaften decided to stress extreme nationalist or sometimes also liberal ideas, leading in time to the exclusion of Jews, who were considered to be un-German. Nevertheless, all Burschenschaften were banned as revolutionary by Klemens Wenzel von Metternich of Austria when he issued the reactionary Carlsbad Decrees in 1819.

Many Burschenschafter took part in the Hambacher Fest in 1832 and the democratic Revolution in 1848/49. After this revolution had been suppressed, plenty of leading Burschenschafter, such as Friedrich Hecker and Carl Schurz, went abroad. After the foundation of the German Empire in 1871, the Burschenschaften movement faced a severe crisis, as one major goal had been achieved to some extent: German unification. In the 1880s, a renaissance movement, the Reformburschenschaften, led by the ideas of Küster, arose and many new B!B! were founded. It was also during this time until the 1890s when many members turned increasingly towards anti-Semitic outlook believing it provided an approach to achieving the fraternity's fundamental goal. Such members viewed the Jews as a problem that hampered the unification of Germany and the achievement of new values the organization advanced. There were members who resigned to protest a resolution adopted at an Eisenach meeting declaring that Burschenschaft "have no Jewish members and do not plan to have any in the future."

=== Interbellum and Nazi Germany ===
In 1935/36, most Burschenschaften north of the Austrian Alps were dissolved by the Nazi government or transformed and fused with other Studentenverbindungen into so-called Kameradschaften (comradeships). Some Nazis (e.g. Ernst Kaltenbrunner) and Nazi opponents (Karl Sack, Hermann Kaiser) were members of Burschenschaften. Theodor Herzl, an Austrian Jewish journalist who founded modern political Zionism, was also a member of a Burschenschaft. However, he resigned two years after he joined because of the fraternity's antisemitism.

=== Postwar ===
While in communist East Germany Burschenschaften were prohibited as representatives of a bourgeois attitude to be extinguished, in West Germany most Burschenschaften were refounded in the 1950s. Some of them had to be transferred into other cities, since Germany had lost great parts of its territories after the Second World War, and many Burschenschaften from East Germany also tried to find a new home. The allied victors had forbidden refounding Burschenschaften originally, but this could not be upheld in a liberal surrounding. In the 1970s and 1980s, the Burschenschaften, as many other student fraternities, underwent a crisis: a lack of new members and strong attacks by the leftist student community. In the 1990s many Burschenschaften that had left Eastern Germany in the 1940s and 1950s returned to their traditional home universities in the East.

=== Today ===
Roughly 160 Burschenschaften still exist today and many are organized in different organizations ranging from progressive to nationalistic. Among the latter is the Deutsche Burschenschaft organization (DB, German Burschenschaft), which represents about a third of the Burschenschaften. Others are organized in the SchwarzburgbundSchwarzburgbund (Schwarzburg League), the Neue Deutsche BurschenschaftNeue Deutsche Burschenschaft (NeueDB, New Germany Fraternity) or the Allgemeine Deutsche BurschenschaftAllgemeine Deutsche Burschenschaft (General German Student Union). While the DB still insists upon Fichte's idea of a German nation based on language, thought and culture, the NeueDB favors defining Germany as the political Germany established by the German Basic Law (constitution) in 1949 and altered by the 1990 unification. Many Burschenschaften are not organized at all since they do not see an organization that represents their values sufficiently.

Because of the German emigration into Chile in the late 19th century, there are also some Burschenschaften in Chile, organized in the Bund Chilenischer Burschenschaften in contact with the German and Austrian organizations. These are B! Araucania (Santiago), B! Andinia (Santiago), B! Montania (Concepción), B! Ripuaria (Viña Del Mar) and B! Vulkania (Valdivia). Contrary to popular belief, there is no precise political view point held by these Burschenschaften, in fact, they don't really mix with politics, mostly focusing on maintaining B! culture (still, fencing is prohibited in Chile).

Most Burschenschaften are pflichtschlagend, i.e. their members must sustain a number of Mensuren. Academic fencing is still an important part of their self-understanding as well as political education.

Many Burschenschaften, often found in certain "umbrella" organisations (such as the Burschenschaftliche Gemeinschaft), are associated with right-wing or far-right ideas, in particular with the wish for a German state encompassing Austria. In 2013 one Bonn fraternity proposed that only students of German origin should be eligible to join a Burschenschaft. Reportedly half of member clubs threatened to leave in a row over proposed ID cards and a decision to label an opponent of Adolf Hitler a "traitor". Many of the Burschenschaften that left the Deutsche Burschenschaft following this were later involved in the founding of a new organization, the Allgemeine Deutsche Burschenschaft.

== Notable Burschenschaft members ==
- Otto Abel (1824–1854)
- Erich Adickes (1866–1928)
- Victor Adler (1852–1918)
- Heinrich Ahrens (1808–1874)
- Wilhelm Altmann (1862–1951)
- Otto Antonius (1885–1945)
- Rudolf Arndt (1835–1900)
- Ludwig Arndts von Arnesberg (1803–1878)
- Jürgen Aschoff (1913–1998)
- Ludwig Aschoff (1866–1942)
- Friedrich Wilhelm Nietzsche (1844–1900)
- Berthold Auerbach (1812–1882)
- Hans von und zu Aufseß (1801–1872)
- Hermann Bahr (1863–1934)
- Franz Bäke (1898–1978)
- Erwin Bälz (1849–1913)
- Ludwig Bamberger (1823–1899)
- Dietrich Barfurth (1849–1927)
- Hermann Baumgarten (1825–1893)
- Karl Theodor Bayrhoffer (1812–1888)
- Ludwig Bechstein (1801–1860)
- Karl Isidor Beck (1817–1879)
- Hermann Heinrich Becker (1820–1885)
- Wilhelm Beiglböck (1905–1963)
- Hans Berger (1873–1941)
- Robert Bernardis (1908–1944)
- Georg Beseler (1809–1888)
- Max Bezzel (1824–1871)
- Adalbert Bezzenberger (1851–1922)
- Karl Biedermann (1812–1901)
- Helmut Bischoff (1908–1993)
- Karl Blind (1826–1907)
- Kurt Blome (1894–1969)
- Hans Blum (1841–1910)
- Robert Blum (1807–1848)
- Hans-Friedrich Blunck (1888–1961)
- Franz Boas (1858–1942)
- Otto Böckel (1859–1923)
- Ehrenfried-Oskar Boege (1889–1965)
- Ernst Wilhelm Bohle (1903–1960)
- Herbert Böhme (1907–1971)
- Carl Bosch (1874–1940)
- Erich Brandenburg (1868–1946)
- Rudolf Breitscheid (1874–1944)
- Heinrich Karl Brugsch (1827–1894)
- Alfred Buntru (1887–1974)
- Franz Josef Ritter von Buß (1803–1878)
- Paul Carell (1911–1997)
- Friedrich Wilhelm Carové (1789–1852)
- Moritz Carrière (1817–1895)
- Hans Gerhard Creutzfeldt (1885–1964)
- Johann Nepomuk Czermak (1828–1873)
- Adalbert Czerny (1863–1941)
- Kurt Daluege (1897–1946)
- Georg Friedrich Daumer (1800–1875)
- Eduard David (1863–1930)
- Kurt H. Debus (1908–1983)
- Richard Dedekind (1831–1916)
- Richard Dehmel (1863–1920)
- Franz Josef Delonge (1927–1988)
- Heinrich Dernburg (1829–1907)
- Paul Deussen (1845–1919)
- Ernst Dieffenbach (1811–1855)
- Kai Diekmann (born 1964)
- Eberhard Diepgen (born 1941)
- Martin Disteli (1802–1844)
- Anton von Doblhoff-Dier (1800–1872)
- Albert Döderlein (1860–1941)
- August Heinrich Hermann von Dönhoff (1797–1874)
- Max Dortu (1826–1849)
- August Dresbach (1894–1968)
- Henri Druey (1799–1855)
- Max Duncker (1811–1886)
- Irmfried Eberl (1910–1948)
- Victor von Ebner (1842–1925)
- Rudolf Eisenmenger (1902–1994)
- Adolf Erman (1854–1937)
- Abraham Esau (1884–1955)
- Hermann Esser (1900–1981)
- Rudolf Eucken (1846–1926)
- Otto Fahr (1892–1969)
- Johannes Falke (1823–1876)
- Ferdinand Falkson (1820–1900)
- Wilhelm Feddersen (1832–1918)
- Georg Fein (1803–1869)
- Friedrich Feuerbach (1806–1880)
- Karl Wilhelm Feuerbach (1800–1834)
- Julius von Ficker (1826–1902)
- Hans Fischer (1881–1945)
- Wilhelm Fleischmann (1837–1920)
- Walther Flemming (1843–1905)
- Walter Flex (1887–1917)
- Richard Foerster (1843–1922)
- August Ludwig Follen (1794–1855)
- Charles Follen (1796–1840)
- Paul Follen (1799–1844)
- August Föppl (1854–1924)
- Peter Wilhelm Forchhammer (1801–1894)
- Heinrich Förster (1800–1881)
- Karl Emil Franzos (1848–1904)
- Heinrich Friedjung (1851–1920)
- Ludwig Friedländer (1824–1909)
- Max Friedländer (1829–1872)
- Julius Fröbel (1805–1893)
- Emil Frommel (1828–1896)
- Reinhard Furrer (1940–1995)
- Friedrich von Gagern (1794–1848)
- Heinrich von Gagern (1799–1880)
- Max von Gagern (1810–1889)
- Jürgen Gansel (born 1974)
- Friedrich Heinrich Geffcken (1830–1896)
- Emanuel Geibel (1815–1884)
- Hans Geiger (1882–1945)
- Edgar von Gierke (1877–1945)
- Otto von Gierke (1841–1921)
- Gerd Gies (born 1943)
- Otto Gildemeister (1823–1902)
- Rudolf von Gneist (1816–1895)
- Friedrich Goltz (1834–1902)
- Heinrich Göppert (1800–1884)
- Rudolf von Gottschall (1823–1909)
- Adolf Gottstein (1857–1941)`
- Carl Graebe (1841–1927)
- Fritz Graebner (1877–1934)
- Martin Graf (born 1960)
- Maximilian Gritzner (1843–1902)
- Karl Groos (1861–1946)
- Bernhard von Gudden (1824–1886)
- Eugen Gura (1842–1906)
- Alfred Gürtler (1875–1933)
- Karl Gutzkow (1811–1878)
- Friedrich Haase (1808–1867)
- Karl Hagen (1810–1868)
- Jörg Haider (1950–2008)
- Adolf von Harleß (1806–1879)
- Wilhelm von Hartel (1839–1907)
- Karl Hase (1800–1890)
- Ludwig Hassenpflug (1794–1862)
- Wilhelm Hauff (1802–1827)
- Johann Hauler (1829–1888)
- Otto Haupt (1887–1988)
- Adolph Hausrath (1837–1909)
- Ludwig Häusser (1818–1867)
- Rudolf Haym (1821–1901)
- Johann Gustav Heckscher (1797–1865)
- Ernst Heinkel (1888–1958)
- Kurt Heißmeyer (1905–1967)
- Wolfgang Helbig (1839–1915)
- Fritz Hellwig (1912–2017)
- Ernst Wilhelm Hengstenberg (1802–1869)
- Gottlieb August Herrich-Schäffer (1799–1874)
- Heinrich Hertz (1857–1894)
- Georg Herwegh (1817–1875)
- Theodor Herzl (1860–1904)
- William Hexamer (1825–1870)
- Eduard Heyck (1862–1941)
- Carl Hierholzer (1840–1871)
- Bruno Hildebrand (1812–1878)
- Franz Hilgendorf (1839–1904)
- Heinrich Himmler (1900–1945)
- Hans Hinkel (1901–1960)
- Hermann Höcherl (1912–1989)
- August Heinrich Hoffmann von Fallersleben (1798–1874)
- Norbert Hofer (born 1971)
- Otto Höfler (1901–1987)
- Johann Wilhelm Friedrich Höfling (1802–1853)
- Johann Christian Konrad von Hofmann (1810–1877)
- Robert Hohlbaum (1886–1955)
- Karl von Holtei (1798–1880)
- Gerd Honsik (1941–2018)
- Hermann Höpker-Aschoff (1883–1954)
- Leslie Hore-Belisha, 1st Baron Hore-Belisha (1893–1957)
- Hermann von Ihering (1850–1930)
- Carl Ernst Jarcke (1801–1852)
- Karl Jarres (1874–1951)
- Curt Joël (1865–1945)
- Karl Jordan (1861–1959)
- Franz Jung (1888–1963)
- Philipp Wilhelm Jung (1884–1965)
- Rudolf Jung (1882–1945)
- Franz Joseph Damian Junghanns (1800–1875)
- Hugo Jury (1887–1945)
- Peter Kaiser (1793–1864)
- Ernst Kaltenbrunner (1903–1946)
- Lorenz Franz Kielhorn (1840–1908)
- Gustav Koerner (1809–1896)
- Friedrich Lange (1852–1917)
- Otto Lubarsch (1860–1933)
- Francis Lieber (1800–1871)
- Theodor Mommsen (1817–1903)
- Hans Mühlenfeld (1901–1969)
- Henry Bradford Nason (1831–1895)
- Franz Overbeck (1837–1905)
- Heinz Reinefarth (1903–1979)
- Karl Sack (1896–1945)
- Karl Ludwig Sand (1795–1820)
- Carl Schurz (1829–1906)
- Otto Skorzeny (1908–1975)
- Lorenz von Stein (1815–1890)
- Gustav Stresemann (1878–1929)
- Adalbert J. Volck (1828–1912)

== See also ==
- The Revolutions of 1848 in the German states — (Burschenschaften were student groups which played a part in beginning of the Prussian Revolution)
- Hep-Hep riots
- Karl Ludwig Sand
- Dueling scars
