= Albert Dietrich (pathologist) =

German physician and pathologist (1873–1961)

Albert Dietrich (4 March 1873 – 1 September 1961) was a German pathologist.

== Life ==
Albert Dietrich was born on 4 March 1873 in Schweidnitz, Province of Silesia. A graduate in medicine, after years as an assistant and subsequent habilitation in pathology in 1906, he received a professorship in pathology at the University of Tübingen. In 1916, he moved to the same professorship at the University of Cologne, until he returned to Tübingen in 1928 to take up the chair of pathology again. Additionally, he served as rector there in the academic years 1933 and 1934. Dietrich, editor of the Journal for Cancer Research from 1933 to 1944, chairman of the German Central Committee for Cancer Control and Cancer Research from 1951 to 1955, was honored in 1952 as one of the first doctors for his contributions to cancer research with the Paracelsus Medal.

Dietrich focused scientifically on pathological anatomy, experimental pathology, and microbiology. He concentrated his work on the research of malignant tumors, infectious diseases, and thrombosis.

Dietrich was a member of the Burschenschaft Palatia Tübingen in the ADB, today known as the Old Turnerschaft Palatia Tübingen. In 1936, he was elected a member of the Leopoldina.

He died on 1 September 1961 in Stuttgart.
