= Georg Beseler =

Prussian jurist and politician (1809–1888)

Carl Georg Christoph Beseler
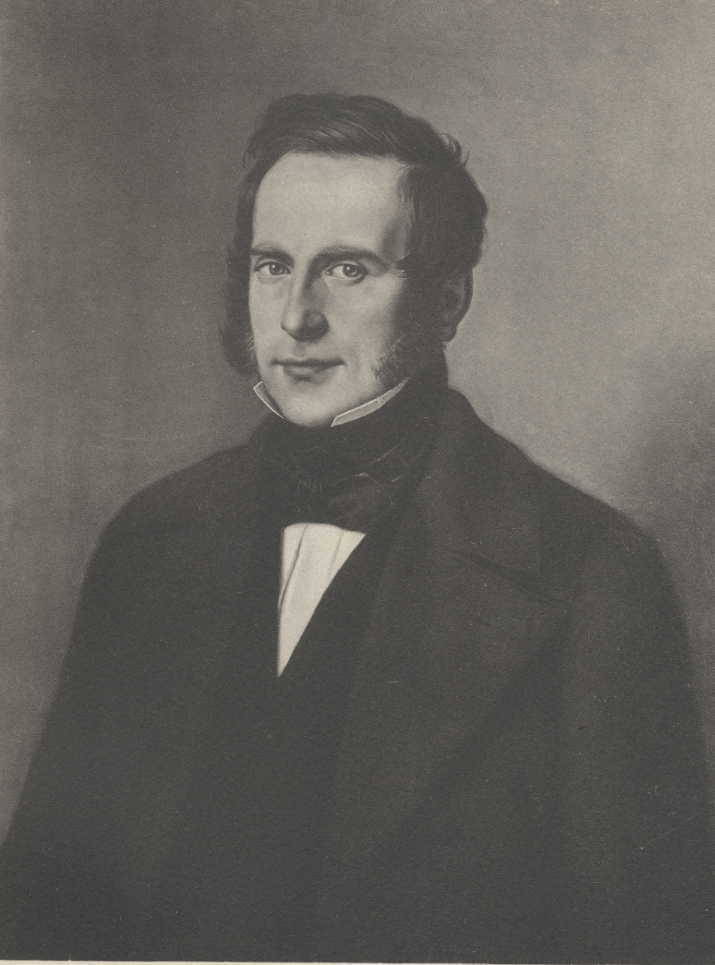
- Georg Beseler

Member of the Frankfurt Parliament

Member of the Prussian House of Lords
- In office 1849–1852
- In office 1857–1887

Member of the Erfurt Union Parliament
- In office 1850–1850

Member of the Reichstag
- In office 1874–1877

Personal details
- Born: 2 November 1809 Rödemis, Duchy of Schleswig
- Died: 28 August 1888 (aged 78) Bad Harzburg, German Empire
- Education: Kiel University; Ludwig-Maximilians-Universität München
- Profession: Jurist

Carl Georg Christoph Beseler (2 November 1809 – 28 August 1888) was a German jurist and politician.

== Biography ==
Beseler studied law at Kiel University and the Ludwig-Maximilians-Universität München. He was forbidden to teach law at Kiel University in 1833 due to his political activity, but he lectured at the University of Göttingen and Heidelberg University. In 1835, he became a professor at the University of Basel, in 1837 at the University of Rostock, 1842 at the University of Greifswald, and 1859 at the Friedrich Wilhelm University of Berlin. He was rector of the Friedrich Wilhelm University of Berlin from 1862 to 1863, from 1867 to 1868, and from 1879 to 1880.

A liberal nationalist, Beseler was a member of the Frankfurt Parliament where he participated in writing the failed 1849 German constitution. From 1849 to 1852 and from 1857 to 1887, he was a member of the Prussian House of Lords, 1850 of the Erfurt Union Parliament, and 1874 to 1877 of the Reichstag.

As a notable "Germanist" opponent of the "Romanists", led by Friedrich Carl von Savigny, Beseler advocated a "people's law" based on Germanic principles as opposed to the Romanists' "jurists' law". The notions of cooperative law and social law later enunciated by Otto von Gierke originate with Beseler. He was also involved in liberalising the codes of civil and criminal procedure, and in crafting the 1851 Prussian criminal code.

Beseler was the father of the general Hans Hartwig von Beseler and the jurist and politician Max von Beseler.

== Sources ==
- Stolleis, Michael (2001). "Carl Georg Christoph Beseler". In Michael Stolleis (ed.). Juristen: Ein biographisches Lexikon. Von der Antike bis zum 20. Jahrhundert (in German) (2nd ed.). München: Beck. p. 82. ISBN 3-406-45957-9.
