= Altlußheim =

- Municipality
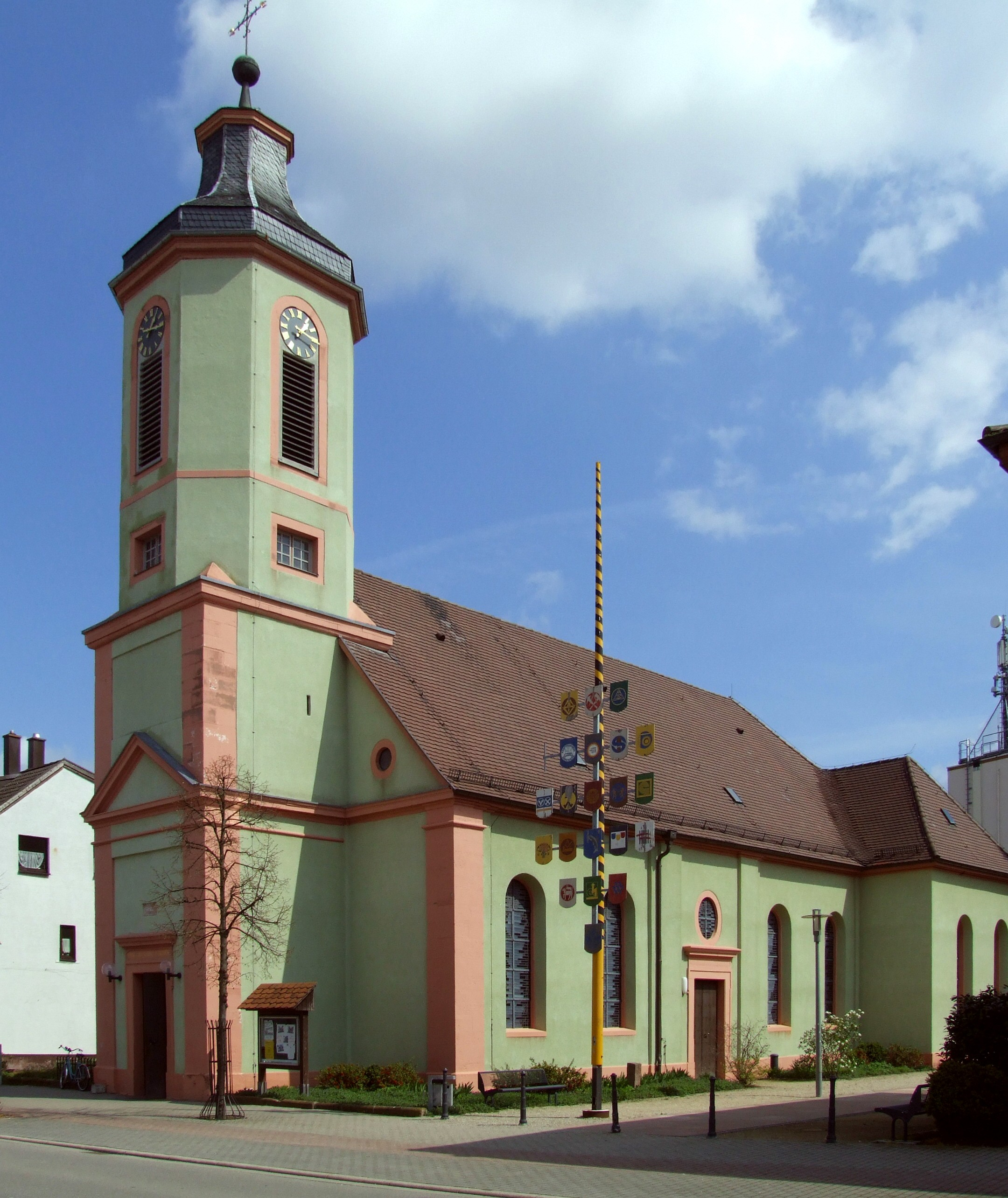
- Protestant Church

- Coat of arms

- Location of Altlußheim within Rhein-Neckar-Kreis district
- Interactive map of Altlußheim
- Location within Germany Location within Baden-Württemberg
- Coordinates: 49°18′N 08°30′E
- Country: Germany
- State: Baden-Württemberg
- Admin. region: Karlsruhe
- District: Rhein-Neckar-Kreis

Government
  - Mayor (2018–26): Uwe Grempels

Area
  - Total: 15.96 km^{2} (6.16 sq mi)
- Elevation: 103 m (338 ft)

Population (2025-12-31)
  - Total: 6,307
  - Density: 395.2/km^{2} (1,023/sq mi)
- Time zone: UTC+01:00 (CET)
  - Summer (DST): UTC+02:00 (CEST)
- Postal codes: 68800–68804
- Dialling codes: 06205
- Vehicle registration: HD
- Website: www.altlussheim.de

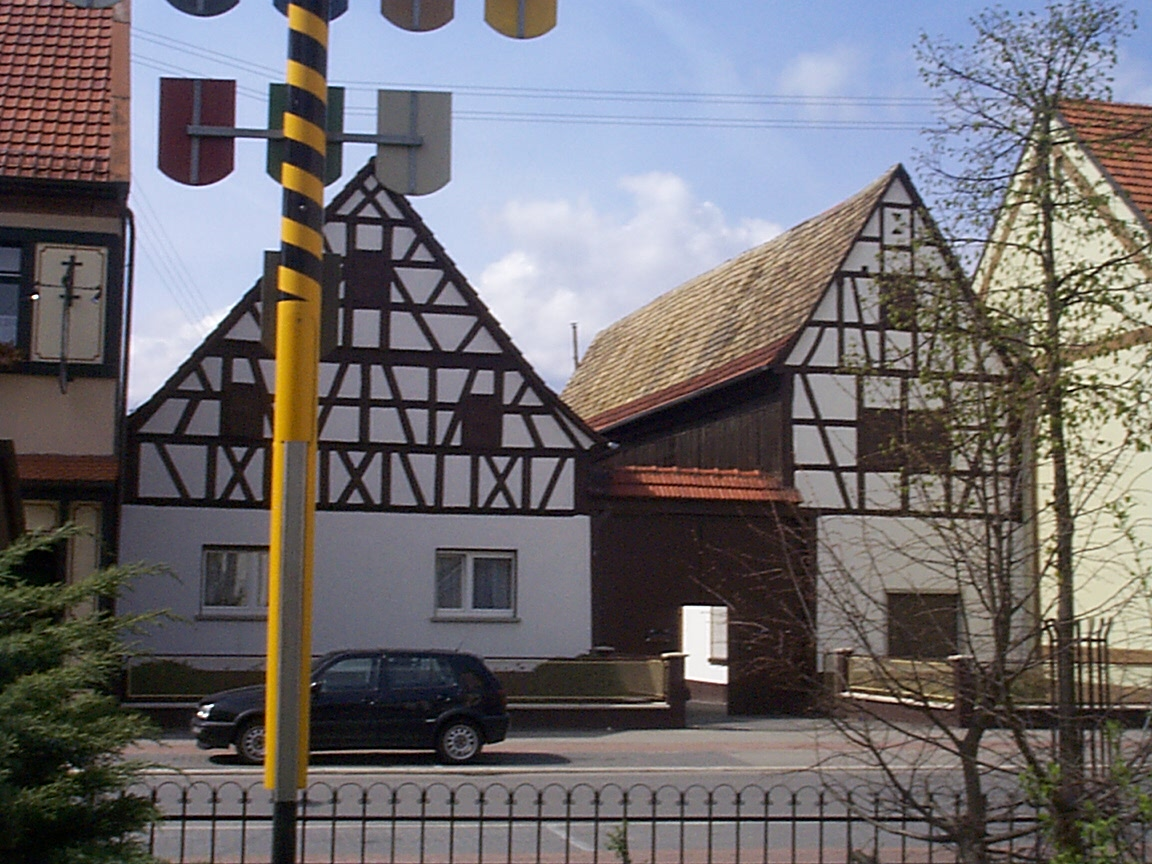
Frankish homestead

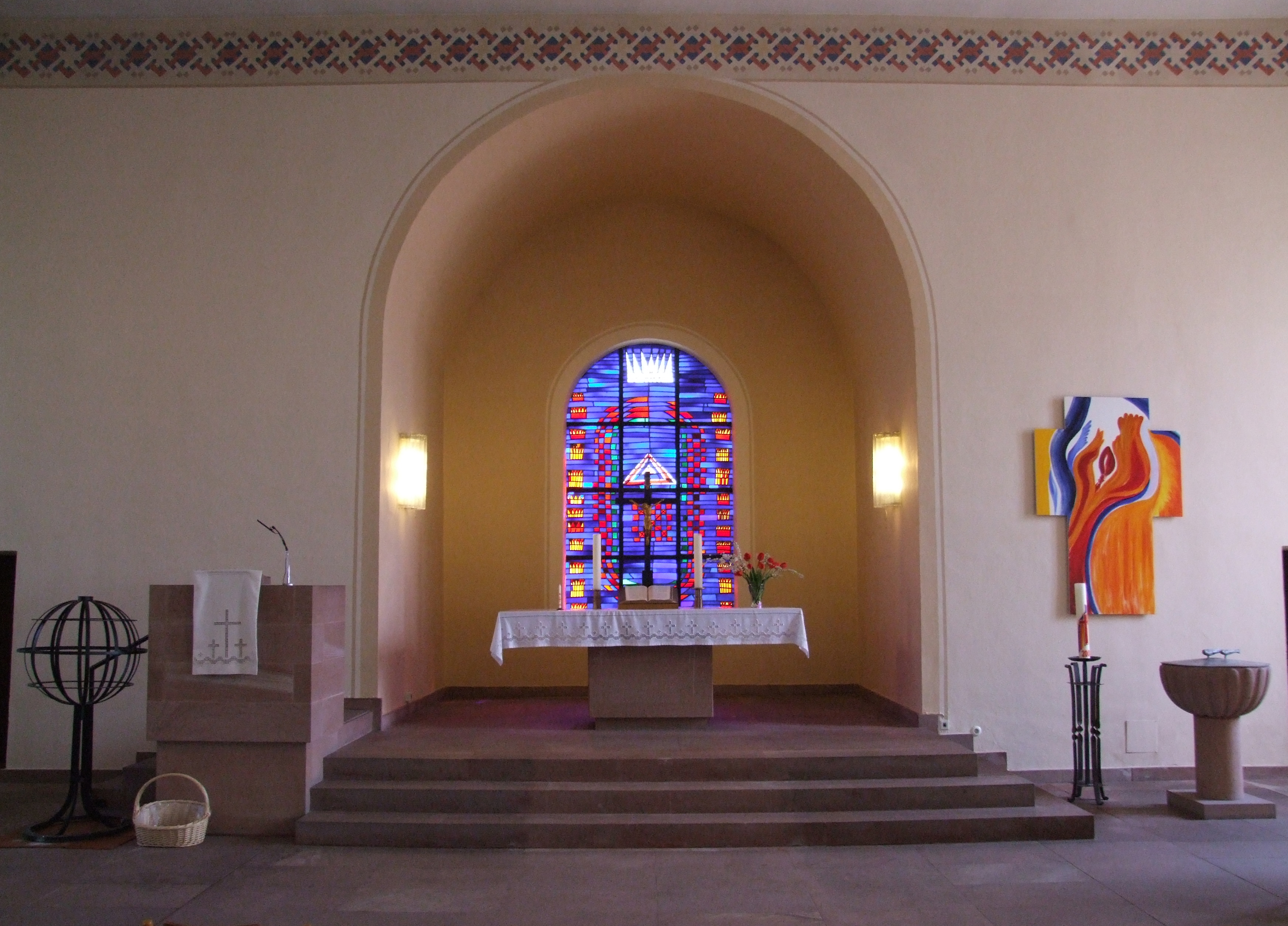
Protestant Church Altlußheim

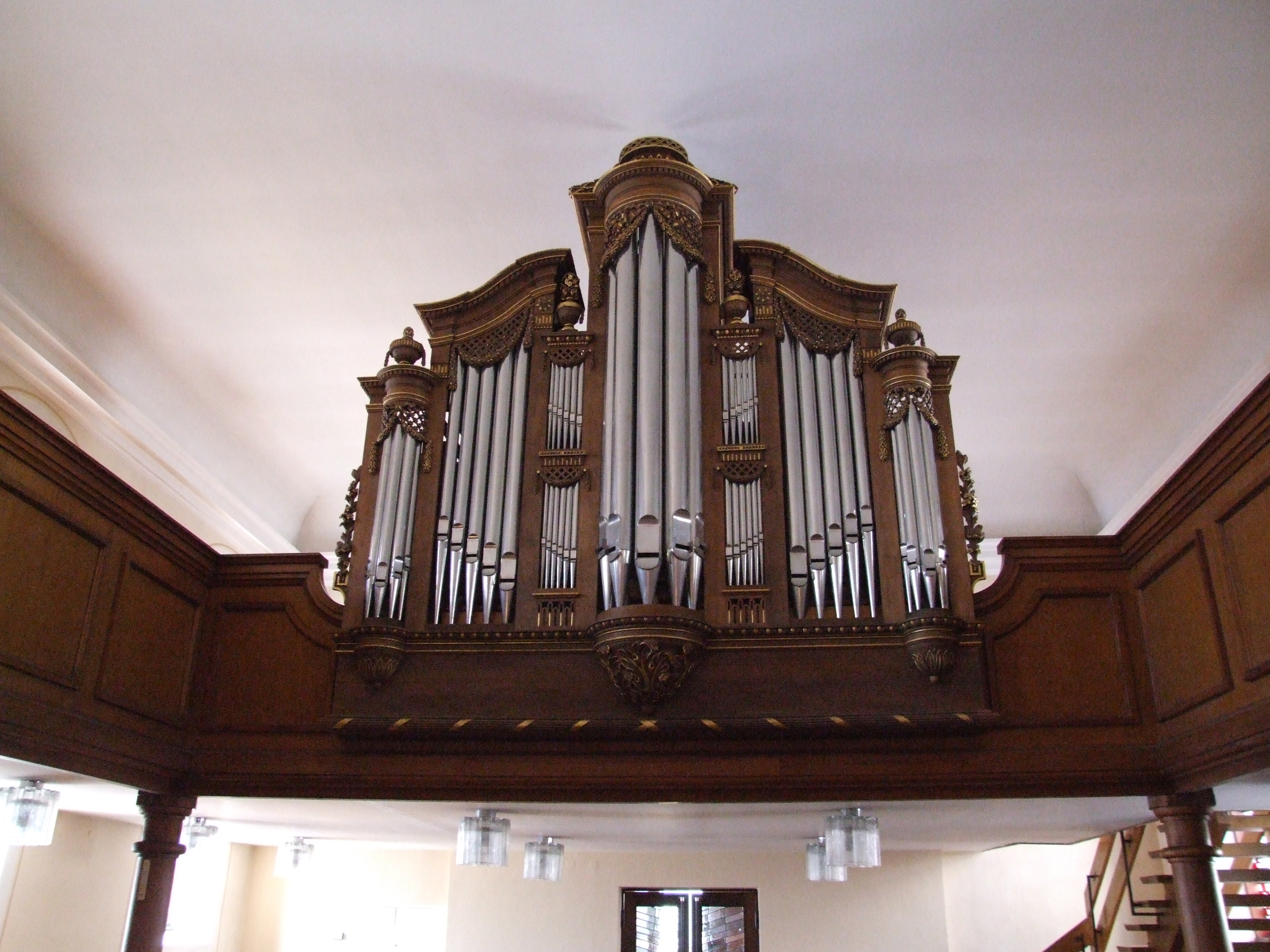
Protestant Church Altlußheim

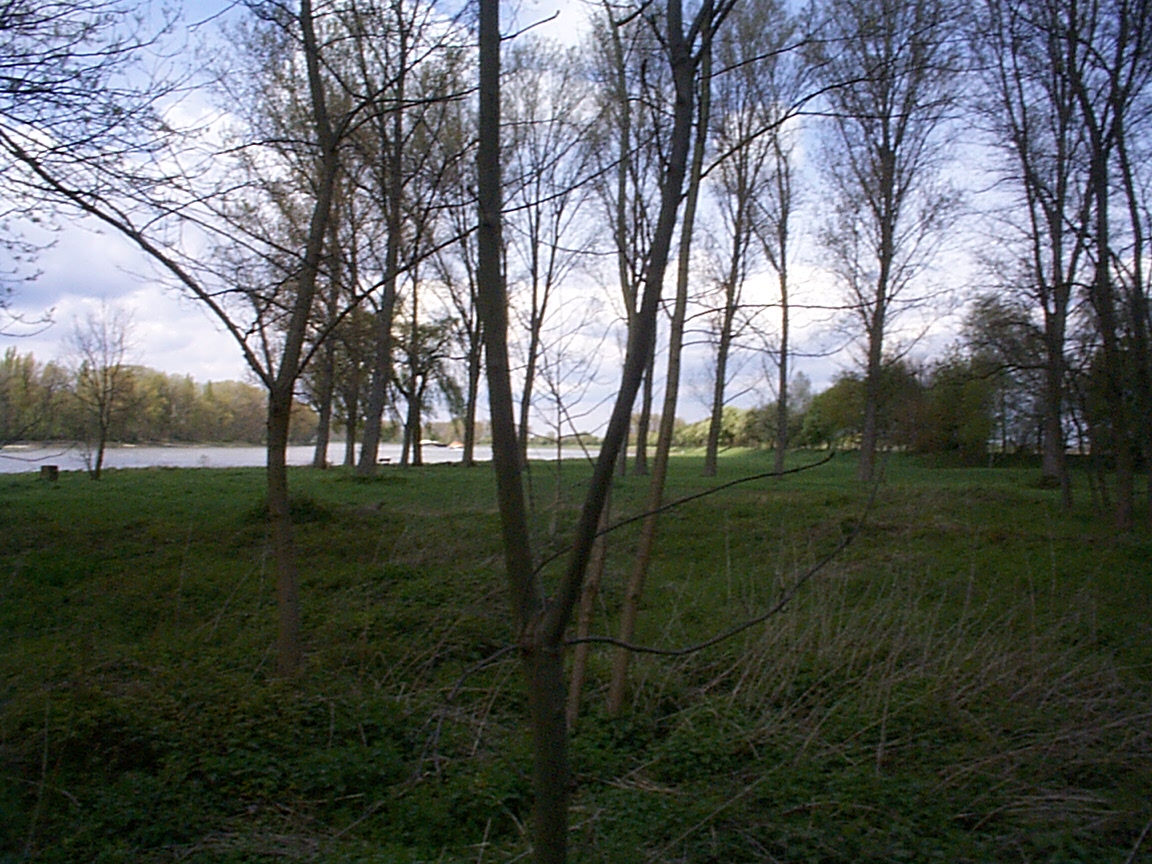
The Rhine at Altlußheim

Altlußheim is a municipality in Baden-Württemberg and belongs to Rhein-Neckar-Kreis.

Altlußheim sits in the Rhine rift directly on the right bank of a meandering of the Rhine, where the Kriegbach flows into the Rhine.

West of the municipality, on the opposite side of the Rhine in the Rhineland-Palatinate is the city of Speyer. Altlußheim is connected to Speyer by federal highway (Bundesstraße) B 39. Less than a kilometer to the East lies Neulußheim. To the South is Oberhausen-Rheinhausen. To the North-East Altlußheim borders on Hockenheim.

== History ==
Over the centuries, the name of the village has changed often. One can find the following documented: Lossa, Locze, Loszem, Lossem, Lozsheim, Lussem, Luzheim, and later Lußheim.

Lußheim was originally a fishing settlement on the Roman road. The residents lived from fishing in the waters of the meanderings of the Rhine. At the highest point in the village, there was a heathen temple. Later a church was built on the same ground.

In the year 496/497, the Franks attacked the local ruling Allemanni and drove them back to the Murg. Lußheim is without a doubt a Frankish settlement. Proof lies in -heim in the name of the community, as well as the typically Frankish homesteads which still exist to this day, namely the homesteads at Rheinhäuser Straße 8 and Hauptstraße 74. Also the row graves that have been found also suggest the beginnings of the Ripuarian Franks. Geographically speaking, Altlußheim is in the middle of ripuarian-Frankish territory, a subdivision of Greater Franconia of the Middle Ages. Politically, Loszem (the name of Lußheim at that time) belonged to the duchy of the ripuarian Franks. Lußheim was first mentioned in documents in 946, in which Lußheim was given to bishop Reginald I of Speyer from duke Konrad, in order to found Maulbronn Abbey. The Maulbronn Abbey had full rights over all Schultheiß (sheriff or reeve), citizens, and serfs. The abbey was entitled to the greater tithe on parish and town incomes.

In 1353 Lußheim came under the control of the Electorate of the Palatinate. Because of the extremes between the count palantine Fredrick I and the lord of the Maulbronn Abbey, Ulrich, duke of Württemberg, the residents of Lußheim suffered greatly. When it came to open war between the two princes, the village was completely destroyed. Lußheim was left to its fate for years under the friction between the patrons of Württemberg and the bishops of Speyer. Only after 1504 did things return to normal, when the duke of Württemberg defeated the Palantines. Lußheim became part of Württemberg again.

At this time, a large proportion of the population were serfs of the Maulbronn Abbey. This was the case until the middle of the 18th century. According to one document, the time between 1689 and 1692 was quite turbulent. The village was plundered and put to the torch by enemy soldiers many times. In 1692 the village had 18 burghers, 13 widows, and 28 orphans. Two thirds of the villages and the Schultheiß Johann Konrad Zeitern were murdered by enemy soldiers. The church, the pastor's house, the city hall, and most of the houses and barns were burned to the ground.

At the time of the construction of the Speyer Cathedral in 1774, Lußheim was required to quarry, bake, and deliver 200,000 bricks. From 1804 to 1882, as the Rhine levee was built to Speyer and the green drainage was carried out, a lot of land could be made farmable. Many large farms were created. At this time, they began clearing the land where Neulußheim was to be. In 1803, after taking away the area that was to be Neulußheim, Altlußheim had 2133 morgen of land, 903 morgen of fields (about three quarters of which for planting and another quarter for grazing), 205 morgen of community forest, 100 morgen of Rhine forest, and 925 morgen of private forest.

Through the treaty that formed the Confederation of the Rhine, Rheinbundakte, Lußheim became a part of the newly formed grand duchy of Baden. In 1821 the settlement Neulußheim became independent. To avoid confusion Lußheim was renamed Altlußheim.

The original fishing village, Lußheim, became important due to the establishment of a ferry. Lußheim had the right to appoint the ferry master (called Fergenmeister) for Lußheim and Ketsch. At that time, running the ferry crossing had economic value for the people in Altlußheim. In 1840 a pontoon bridge was erected, which was replaced in 1938 with a rail and road bridge. This bridge was blown up in 1945 at the end of the Second World War. 1955 the Salier-Brücke (Salian Bridge) was built at the same location. This road bridge connects to Speyer. In the 1970s, north of Speyer, a pylon bridge was built for the A 61.

Until 31 December 1972, Altlußheim belonged to Mannheim. Since then Altlußheim is part of the Rhein-Neckar-Kreis.

== Government ==
The community is a member of a communal government with the city of Hockenheim.

=== Municipal council ===
Municipal Council 2019
Party	Votes	Seats
Greens	29.6 %	4
Independent (Freiewähler)	28.3 %	4
CDU	24.4 %	3
SPD	17.7 %	3
Voter Participation: 60.6%

=== Coat of arms ===
The blazon is sable with a lion or with claws and tongue gules rampant behind a base trio of hill vert and grasping a leafed-staff or.

The coat of arms is based on a mistake. Altlußheim never belonged to the Palatinate of the Rhine, which is symbolized by the lion. A seal from some time after 1513 shows the rump of an ass. This indicates the fealty to Maulbronn Abbey and therewith to the duchy of Württemberg. The confusion arose from a poor quality colored stamp which the community used in the 19th century. On the recommendation of the general archive of the state, Altlußheim adopted the current coat of arms in 1900.

The flag is yellow and black and was awarded by the Ministry of the Interior on 16 May 1959.

== Museums ==
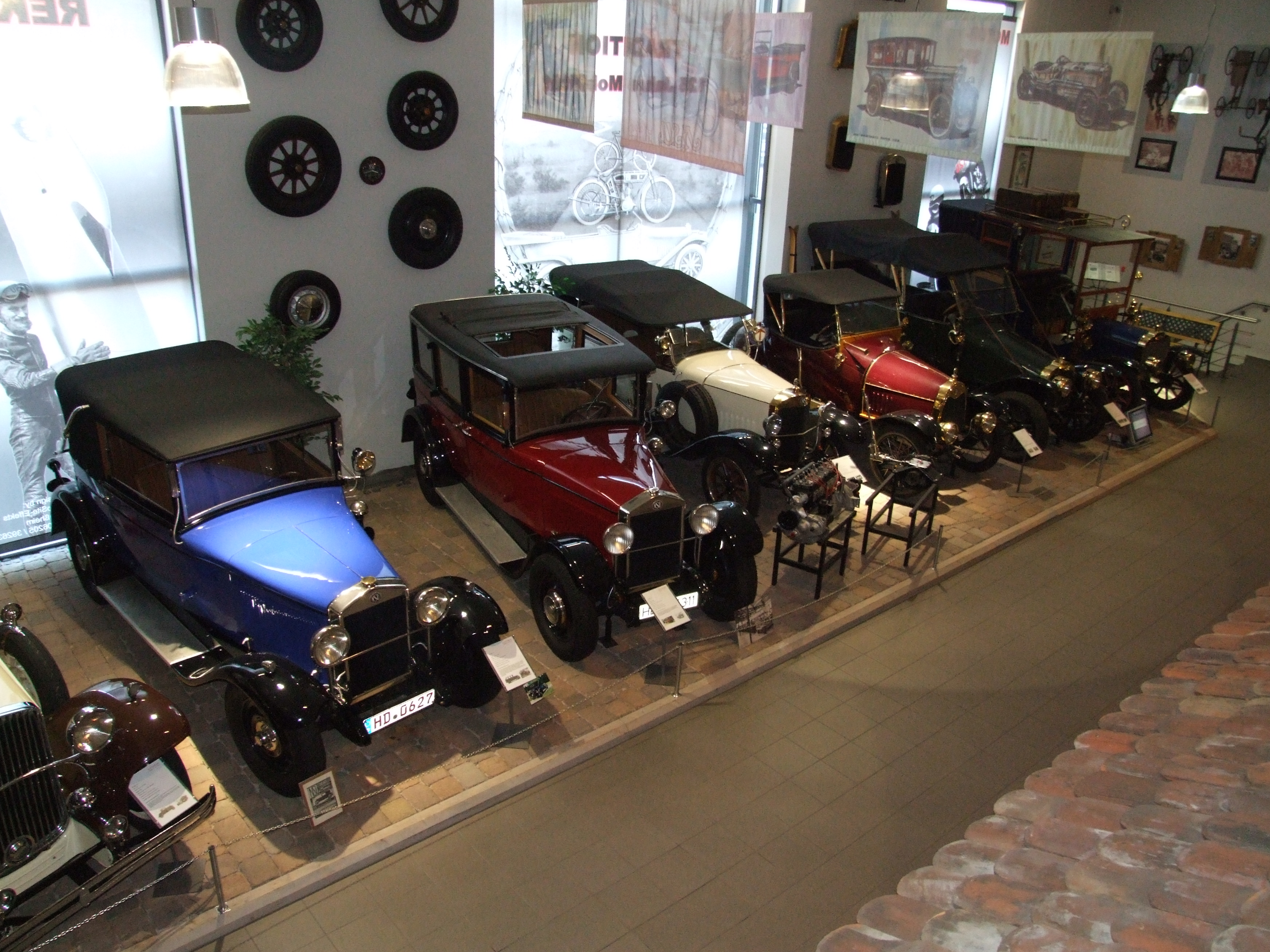
NSU-Oldtimer, Museum Autovision

- Museum Autovision — A museum about the past and future trends in automobile design.
- Schnuteputzer's Friseurmuseum — A public-private hair salon museum.

== Education ==
Albert-Schweitzer-Schule, Primary and secondary schoole with trade school.

== Notable natives ==
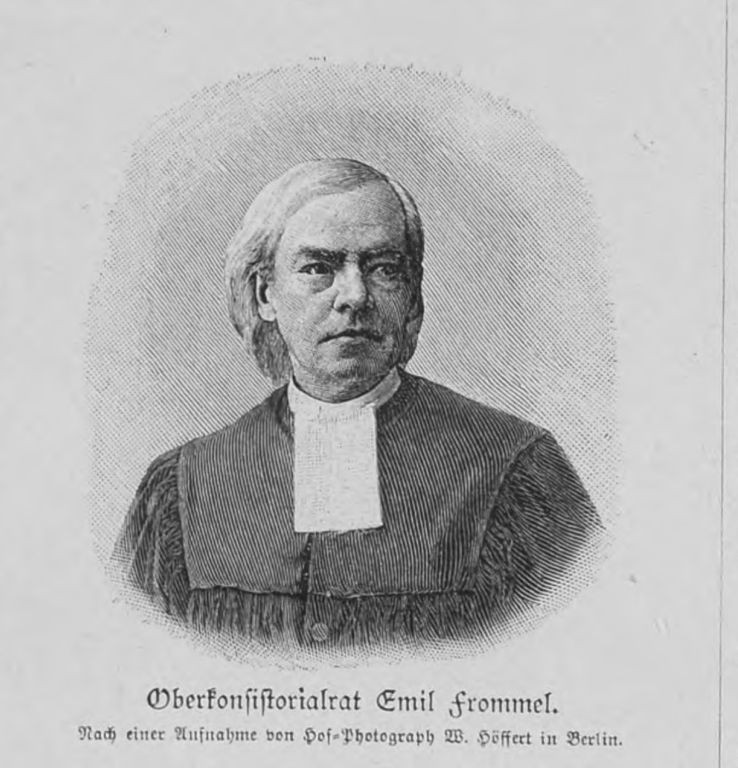
Emil Frommel

- Emil Frommel (1828-1896), military chaplain and writer
- Heinz Hoppe (1924-1993), Kammersänger

== Sister cities ==
- Gersdorf, Germany
