= Velleius Paterculus =

Roman historian, soldier and senator (c. 19 BC – c. AD 31)

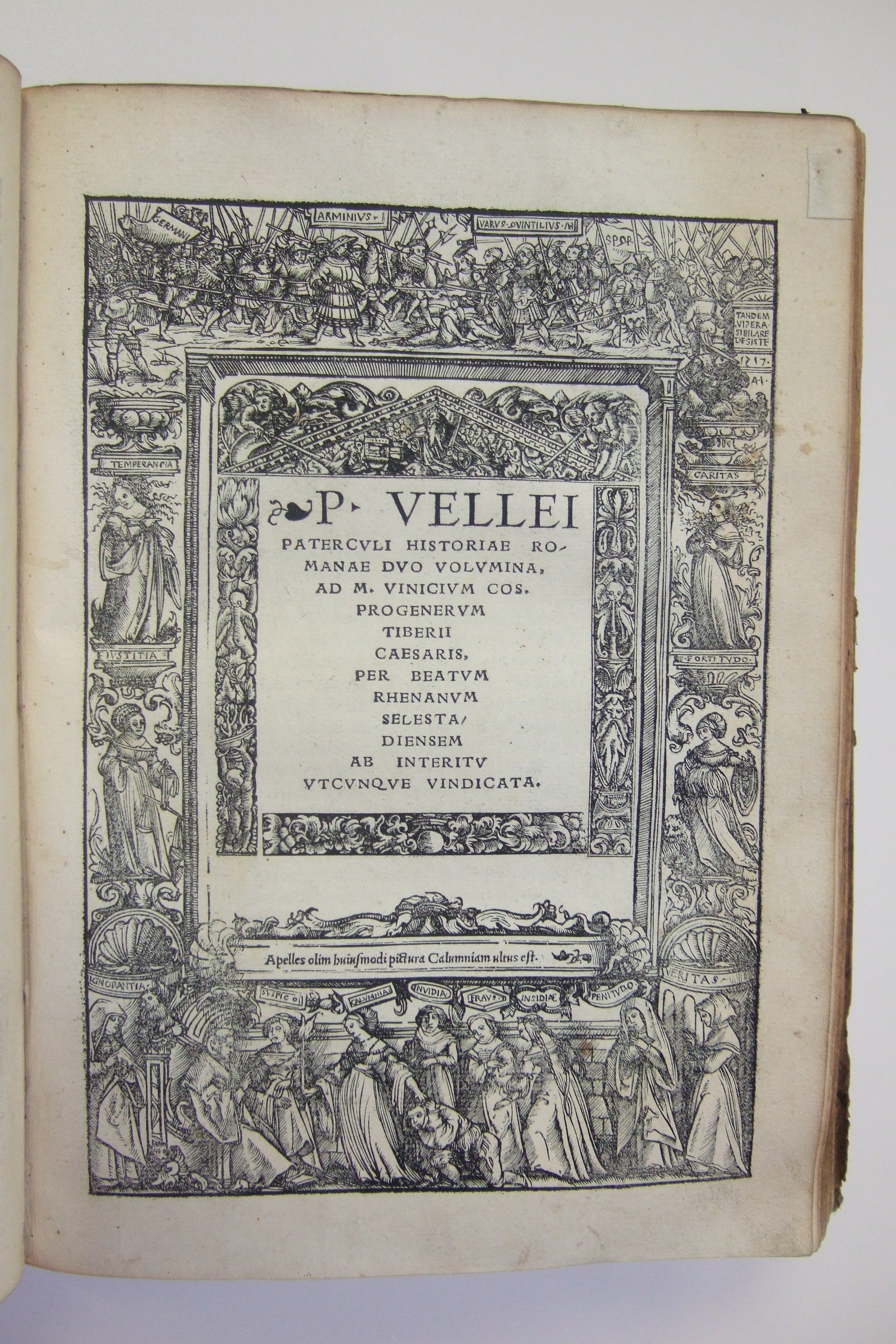
Illustrated title page of the 1520 editio princeps, edited by Beatus Rhenanus

Marcus Velleius Paterculus (/vɛˈliːəs, -ˈleɪəs/; c. 19 BC – c. AD 31) was a Roman historian, soldier and senator. His Roman history, written in a highly rhetorical style, covered the period from the end of the Trojan War to AD 30, but is most useful for the period from the death of Caesar in 44 BC to the death of Augustus in AD 14.

== Biography ==
Few details of Velleius' life are known with certainty; even his praenomen is uncertain. Priscian, the only ancient author to mention it, calls him "Marcus", but the title page of the editio princeps, printed in 1520, calls him "Publius", probably due to confusion with a Publius Velleius mentioned in Tacitus. Elsewhere, the same volume calls him Gaius. Some modern writers use the latter name, based on an inscription found on a milestone at El Harrouch in Algeria, once part of Roman Numidia; but the inscription identifies this Gaius Velleius Paterculus as legatus Augusti, an office that the historian is not known to have held, and it is thought to date from the reigns of Claudius or Nero, by which time he is thought to have been dead. The Gaius Velleius Paterculus referred to may be the same man who was consul in AD 60, and a Lucius Velleius Paterculus was consul in the following year; but it is not apparent how either of them were related to the historian.

Our remaining information comes from Velleius' own brief description of his life, included in his history. He was born into a noble Campanian family about 19 BC, although the place of his birth is unknown. He was a great-great-great-grandson of Minatus Magius of Aeculanum in Samnium, who received the Roman franchise for his actions during the Social War. Several of his ancestors in subsequent generations held important magistracies or military commands, including his uncle, Capito, who was a member of the Roman Senate.

As a young man, Velleius served as a military tribune in Rome's eastern provinces. In AD 2, he was with the army of Gaius Caesar, and personally witnessed the meeting between the young general and Phraates V of Parthia on the banks of the Euphrates. Two years later, Velleius was a cavalry prefect serving in the command of Tiberius in Germania, having already held the office of praefectus castrorum. He continued as a senior member of Tiberius' staff until the future emperor's return to Rome in AD 12. While serving under Tiberius, Velleius was also elected quaestor, an important step on the cursus honorum, filling that office in AD 7.

Before his death in AD 14, the emperor Augustus designated Velleius and his brother, Magius Celer, for the praetorship. The emperor died before the comitia could be held, and so the two brothers were formally elected under Tiberius, serving their year of office in AD 15. Few other particulars of Velleius' life are known; he dedicated his history to Marcus Vinicius, and from his description of events during the latter's consulship in AD 30, Velleius must still have been alive that year. But Velleius was among the friends of Sejanus, whom he praises in his writing, and as there is no evidence that the historian survived his friend's downfall by any great length of time, it seems likely that he shared his fate.

== History ==
The original title of Velleius' history is uncertain. The editio princeps on title page styles it P. Vellei Paterculi Historiae Romanae duo volumina ad M. Vinicium cos. ("Publius Velleius Paterculus' two volumes of Roman History to the consul Marcus Vinicius"), but this was probably assigned the work by a copyist, or by one of the grammarians. The work is frequently referred to as a "compendium of Roman history," which has also been used as the title, as have the more abbreviated Historiae Romanae, or Roman History, or simply Historiae or History.

The work consists of two books, and was apparently conceived as a universal history. The first covers the period from the aftermath of the Trojan War to the destruction of Carthage at the end of the Third Punic War, in 146 BC. The volume is missing several portions, including the beginning, and a section following the eighth chapter, which deals with the founding of Rome. The second book, which continues the history from the age of the Gracchi to the consulship of Marcus Vinicius, in AD 30, is intact. It is particularly useful as the only connected narrative of events during this period; the portions of Livy's history dealing with the late Republic have been lost, and are known only from a brief epitome, while other historians covered only portions of the span. The period from the death of Caesar to that of Augustus is especially detailed.

Velleius' subject matter consists largely of historical highlights and character portraits, omitting subtler if equally important details. He draws upon the historical writings of Cato the Elder, Quintus Hortensius, Gnaeus Pompeius Trogus, Cornelius Nepos, and Livy, most of which have been lost. He also devotes some attention to Greek and Roman literature, and records unique details about Lucius Afranius and Lucius Pomponius, but he curiously omits any mention of important literary figures such as Plautus, Horace, and Propertius. According to Velleius, the peak of perfection in any literary field is arrived at quickly by the first arrivals. However, this was not an original insight, but a standard view of his time.

== Style ==
Velleius' style is characterized by the showy rhetoric, hyperbole, and exaggerated figures of speech that were typical of Silver Age Latin. Modern appraisals of his approach and its results vary considerably. In the Dictionary of Greek and Roman Biography and Mythology, William Smith writes,

In the execution of his work, Velleius has shown great skill and judgment, and has adopted the only plan by which an historical abridgement can be rendered either interesting or instructive. He does not attempt to give a consecutive account of all the events of history; he omits entirely a vast number of facts, and seizes only upon a few of the more prominent occurrences, which he describes at sufficient length to leave them impressed upon the recollection of his hearers. He also exhibits great tact in the manner in which he passes from one subject to another; his reflections are striking and apposite; and his style, which is a close imitation of Sallust's, is characterized by clearness, conciseness, and energy, but at the same time exhibits some of the faults of writers of his age in a fondness for strange and out-of-the-way expressions. As a historian Velleius is entitled to no mean rank; in his narrative he displays impartiality and love of truth, and in his estimate of the characters of the leading actors in Roman history he generally exhibits both discrimination and judgment.

A more critical view appears in the 1911 edition of the Encyclopædia Britannica:

The author is a vain and shallow courtier, and destitute of real historical insight, although generally trustworthy in his statements of individual facts. He may be regarded as a courtly annalist rather than a historian. His knowledge is superficial, his blunders, numerous, his chronology inconsistent. He labours at portrait-painting, but his portraits are daubs... The repetitions, redundancies, and slovenliness of expression which disfigure the work may be partly due to the haste with which (as the author frequently reminds us) it was written. Some blemishes of style, particularly the clumsy and involved structure of his sentences, may perhaps be ascribed to insufficient literary training. The inflated rhetoric, the straining after effect by means of hyperbole, antithesis and epigram, mark the degenerate taste of the Silver Age, of which Paterculus is the earliest example.

In his introduction to Velleius Paterculus, Frederick W. Shipley takes a middle ground:

A compendium of Roman history, hastily compiled by an army officer... could hardly be expected to rise to the level either of great history or great literature. And yet, taken for what it is, a rapid sketch of some ten centuries of history, it is, in spite of its many defects... the most successful and most readable of all the abridgements of Roman history which have come down to us. Abridgements are usually little more than skeletons; but Velleius has succeeded, in spite of the brief compass of his work, in clothing the bare bones with real flesh, and in endowing his compendium with more than a mere shadow of vitality, thanks to his own enthusiastic interest in the human side of the great characters of history... [I]t has certain excellences of its own in the treatment of special subjects, especially the chapters on literary history, in which the author has a genuine if not very critical interest, the chapters on the Roman colonies, and those on the history of the organization of the Roman provinces, and in some of the character portraits of the great figures of Roman history.

== Legacy ==
Velleius' treatise was not intended as a careful and comprehensive study of history. The author acknowledged as much, and stated his desire to write a more detailed work, which he indicated would give a fuller account of the Civil War, and the campaigns of his patron, Tiberius, but there is no reason to believe that he ever did so. His history does not seem to have been widely known in antiquity. According to the scholiast, he was read by Lucan; the Chronica of Sulpicius Severus seems to have been modeled on Velleius' history; and he is mentioned by Priscian, but this seems to be the extent of his influence prior to the discovery of a badly damaged manuscript at Murbach Abbey in Alsace in 1515. Although corrupt and since lost, this formed the basis for the editio princeps published by Beatus Rhenanus in 1520, and a later copy acquired by Orelli.

== Early editions ==
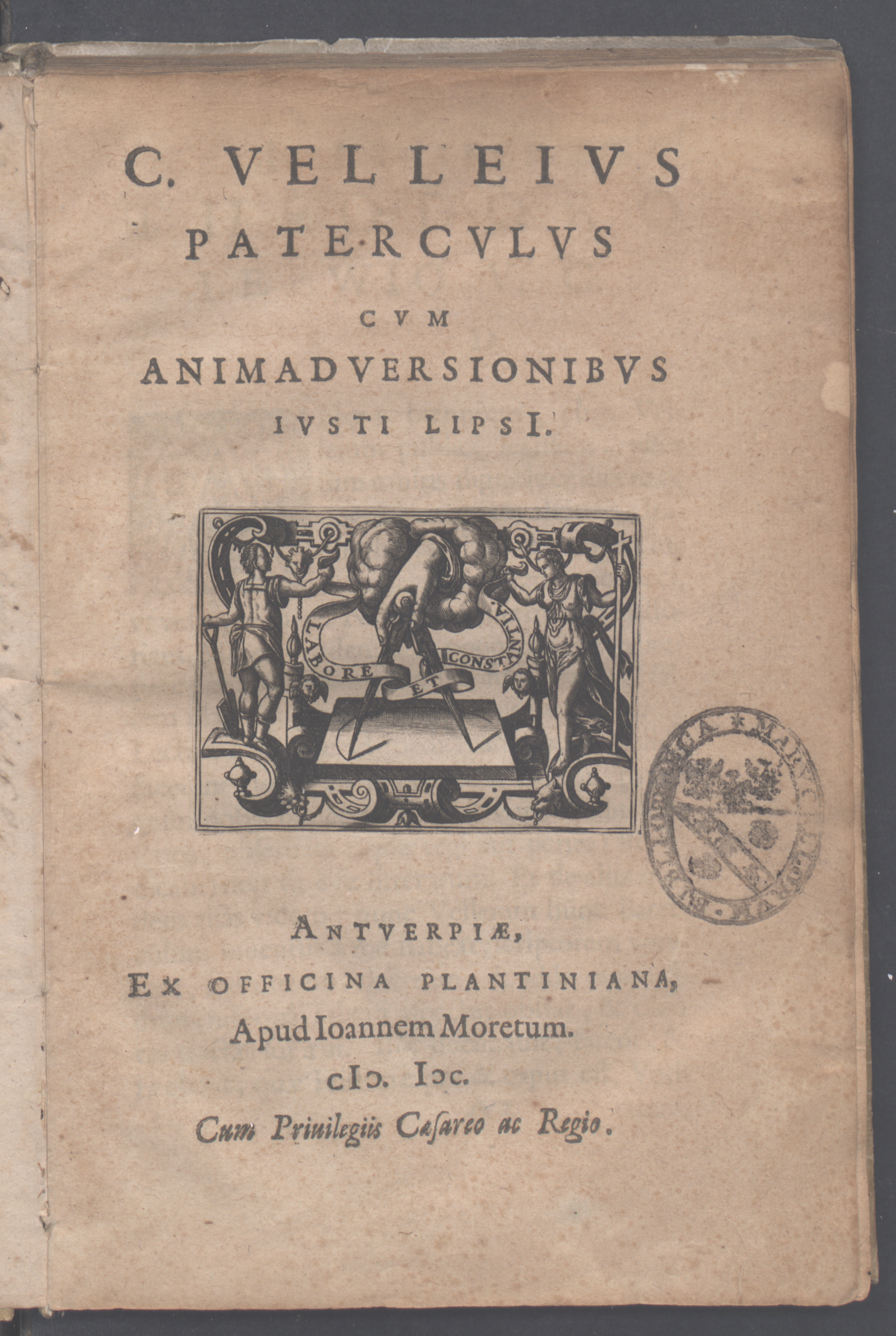
Historia Romana, 1600

- Editio princeps, Beatus Rhenanus, 1520
- early editions by
  - Justus Lipsius, 1591
  - Jan Gruter, 1607
  - Gerardus Vossius, 1639
  - Johan Henrik Boeclerus, 1642
  - Antonius Thysius the Younger, 1653
  - Nikolaes Heinsius the Elder, 1678
  - John Hudson, 1693
  - Pieter Burman the Elder, 1719
  - Ruhnken, 1789, reprinted by Karl Heinrich Frotscher, 1830–1839
- later editions
  - Johann Caspar von Orelli, 1835
  - Justus Friedrich Kritz, 1848
  - Friedrich Gottlob Haase, 1858
  - Karl Felix Halm, 1876
  - Robinson Ellis, 1898, reviewed by William Warde Fowler in Classical Review, May 1899

On the sources see

- F. Burmeister, "De Fontibus Vellei Paterculi," in Berliner Studien für classische Philologie (1894), xv. English translation by J. S. Watson in Bohn's Classical Library.

== Newer editions ==
- Velleius Paterculus, Historiarum Libri Duo, ed. W. S. Watt (2nd ed. 1998. Saur, Stuttgart.) = Bibliotheca scriptorum Graecorum et Romanorum Teubneriana ISBN 3-598-71873-X
- Velleius Paterculus, Ad M. Vinicium Consulem libri duo, ed. Maria Elefante (Olms, Hildesheim 1997) = Bibliotheca Weidmanniana. ISBN 3-487-10257-9

== Commentaries ==
- A. J. Woodman, Velleius Paterculus: The Caesarian and Augustan Narrative (2.41-93) (1983 Cambridge U.P.; repr. 2004 paperback) = Cambridge Classical texts and commentaries 25. ISBN 0-521-60702-7
- A. J. Woodman, Velleius Paterculus: The Tiberian Narrative (1977 Cambridge U.P.; repr. 2004 paperback) = Cambridge Classical texts and commentaries 19. ISBN 0-521-60935-6

=== Translation with Latin text ===
- Velleius Paterculus, Compendium of Roman History, trans. F. W. Shipley; Loeb Classical Library 152 (Harvard University Press, 1924; ISBN 0-674-99168-0)

== Bibliography ==
- Balmaceda, C. (2014). Virtues of Tiberius in Velleius’ "Histories." Historia 63.3: 340–363.
- Connal, R. T. (2013). Velleius Paterculus: The Soldier and the Senator. Classical World 107(1), 49–62.
- Cowan, E. ed., (2011). Velleius Paterculus: Making History. Swansea: Classical Press of Wales.
- Gowing, A. M. (2010). Caesar Grabs my Pen: Writing on Civil War under Tiberius. In Citizens of Discord: Rome and Its Civil Wars. Oxford: Oxford University Press.
- Gowing, A. M. (2005). Empire and Memory. The Representation of the Roman Republic in Imperial Culture. Cambridge: Cambridge University Press.
- Kramer, E. A. (2005). Book One of Velleius’ History: Scope, Levels of Treatment, and Non-Roman Elements. Historia 54.2: 144–161.
- Kuntze, Claudia (1985). Zur Darstellung des Kaiser Tiberius und seiner Zeit bei Velleius Paterculus [On the presentation of Emperor Tiberius and his time in Velleius Paterculus]. Frankfurt/New York: Lang, ISBN 3-8204-7489-7.
- Schmitzer, Ulrich (2000). Velleius Paterculus und das Interesse an der Geschichte im Zeitalter des Tiberius [Velleius Paterculus and the interest in history in the age of Tiberius]. Heidelberg: Winter, ISBN 3-8253-1033-7.
- Schultze, C. (2010). Universal and Particular in Velleius Paterculus. In Historiae Mundi: Studies in Universal Historiography. Edited by P. Liddel and A. Fear, 116–130. London: Duckworth.
- Starr, R. J. (1980). Velleius’ Literary Techniques and the Organization of his History. Transactions and Proceedings of the American Philological Association 110: 287–301.
- Sumner, G. V. (1970). The Truth about Velleius Paterculus: Prolegomena. Harvard Studies in Classical Philology 74: 257–297.
- Syme, R. (1978). Mendacity in Velleius. American Journal of Philology. 99: 45–63.
- Syme, Ronald (1956). "Seianus on the Aventine". Hermes. 84 (3). Franz Steiner Verlag: 257–266. JSTOR 4474933.
- Woodman, A. J. (1975). Velleius Paterculus. In Empire and Aftermath. Silver Latin II. Edited by T. A. Dorey, 1–25. London: Routledge.
