= Kriegbach =

River in Germany

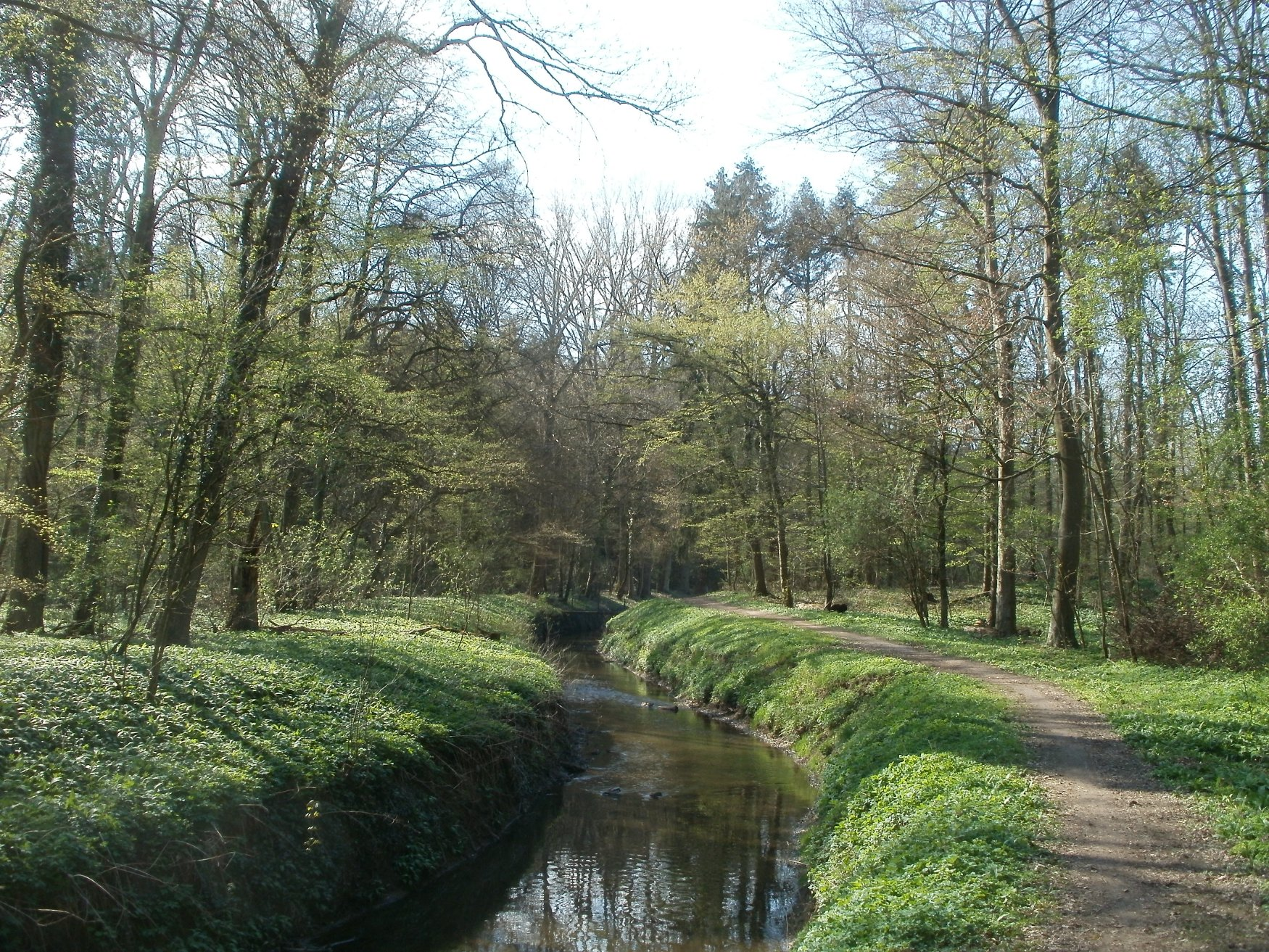

Location
- Country: Germany
- State: Baden-Württemberg

Physical characteristics
- Mouth
  - location: Rhine
  - coordinates: 49.2949°N 8.4907°E
- Length: 18.4 km (11.4 mi)

Basin features
- Progression: Rhine→ North Sea

Kriegbach is a river of Baden-Württemberg, Germany. It branches off the Kraichbach near Ubstadt-Weiher, and flows into the Rhine in Altlußheim.

== See also ==
- List of rivers of Baden-Württemberg
