= Friedrich Gottlob Haase =

German classical philologist (1808–1867)

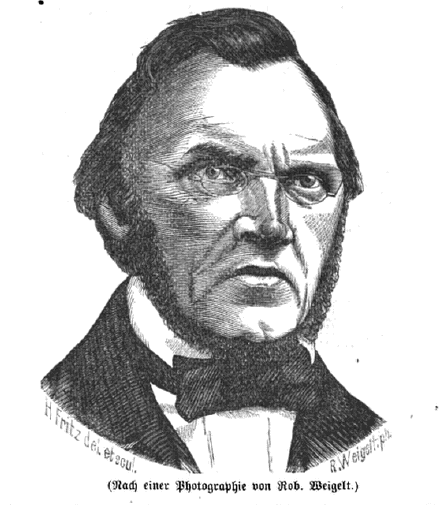
Friedrich Gottlob Haase

Friedrich Gottlob Haase (4 January 1808 – 16 August 1867) was a German classical scholar. He was born in Magdeburg on 4 January 1808.

Haase studied at the Universities of Halle, Greifswald, and Berlin. In 1834, he obtained an appointment at Schulpforta, but he was suspended and sentenced to six years' imprisonment for identifying himself with the Burschenschaften (students' associations).

He visited Paris, after serving one year of his sentence. Upon his return in 1840, he was appointed professor at the University of Breslau, where he remained until his death. He was undoubtedly one of the more successful teachers of his day in Germany and exercised great influence upon all his pupils.

Haase edited several classic authors:

- Xenophon (1833)
- Thucydides (1840) with Latin translation, a Life of Thucydides attributed to Marcellinus and Greek scholia to Thucydides' text
- Velleius Paterculus (1858)
- Seneca the philosopher (2nd edition, 1872)
- Tacitus (1855)

His Vorlesungen über lateinische Sprachwissenschaft was published after his death by Friedrich August Eckstein and Hermann Peter (1874–1880).
