= Justus Friedrich Kritz =

German schoolteacher and classical philologist

Justus Friedrich Kritz (1798, in Kühnhausen – 21 April 1869, in Erfurt) was a German schoolteacher and classical philologist, known for his scholarly examination of the Roman historian Sallust.

He studied philology at the universities of Jena and Berlin, where he was a student of August Böckh. He was a member of the philological seminars at Berlin University (1819–21) and served as an assistant teacher at the Grauen Kloster and at Köllnisches Gymnasium in Berlin. From 1824 to 1867 he taught classes at the gymnasium in Erfurt. In 1835 he attained the title of professor.

== Selected works ==
- C. Sallusti Crispi Opera quae supersunt (3 volumes, 1828–53; edition of the works of Sallust).
- M. Vellei Paterculi quae supersunt ex historiae Romanae, 1848 – Edition of Velleius.
- Parallelgrammatik der griechischen und lateinischen Sprache (with Friedrich Berger, 1848) – Parallel grammar of Greek and Latin language.
- De codicibus Bibliothecae Amplonianae Erfurtensis potioribus, 1850 (as editor).
- Catilina, Iugurtha, Historiarum fragmenta, 1856 – Edition of Sallust (on Catiline, Jugurtha, Historiarum fragmenta).
- De glossematis falso Taciti Agricolae imputatis, 1857.
- Die fragmente des Sallust, 1857 – The fragments of Sallust.
- P. Cornelii Taciti Agricola, 1859 – edition of Tacitus' Agricola.
- Cornelii Taciti De situ ac populis Germaniae liber (with Wilhelm Hirschfelder, 1878).
