= Public law =

Law governing government actions

Public law is the part of law that governs relations and affairs between legal persons and a government, between different institutions within a state, between different branches of governments, as well as relationships between persons that are of direct concern to society. Public law comprises constitutional law, administrative law, tax law and criminal law, as well as all procedural law. Laws concerning relationships between individuals belong to private law.

The relationships public law governs are asymmetric and unequalized. Government bodies (central or local) can make decisions about the rights of persons. However, as a consequence of the rule-of-law doctrine, authorities may only act within the law (secundum et intra legem). The government must obey the law. For example, a citizen unhappy with a decision of an administrative authority can ask a court for judicial review.

The distinction between public law and private law dates back to Roman law, where the Roman jurist Ulpian (c. 170 – 228) first noted it. It was later adopted to understand the legal systems both of countries that adhere to the civil-law tradition, and of those that adhere to common-law tradition.

The borderline between public law and private law is not always clear. Law as a whole cannot neatly be divided into "law for the State" and "law for everyone else". As such, the distinction between public and private law is largely functional rather than factual, classifying laws according to which domain the activities, participants, and principal concerns involved best fit into. This has given rise to attempts to establish a theoretical understanding for the basis of public law. For example, an individual entering into a contract with the government for a service would usually fall within private law, even if the State is involved.

== History of public law ==
The distinction between public and private law was first made by Roman jurist Ulpian, who argues in the Institutes (in a passage preserved by Justinian in the Digest ) that "public law is that which respects the establishment of the Roman commonwealth, private that which respects individuals' interests, some matters being of public and others of private interest." Furthermore, he defines public law as the law concerning religious affairs, the priesthood, and offices of the State. Roman Law conceived of the law as a series of relationships between persons and persons, persons and things, and persons and the State. Public law consisted of the latter of these three relationships. However, Roman lawyers devoted little attention to this area, and instead focused largely on areas of private law. It was, however, of great importance in Teutonic society, as noted by German legal historian Otto von Gierke, who defined the Teutons as the fathers of public law.

Drawing a line between public and private law largely fell out of favor in the ensuing millennium, though, as Ernst Kantorowicz notes, Medieval jurists saw a concern with the Roman conception of the res publica inherent in the legal fiction of the king's two bodies. However, legal philosophers during this period were largely theologians who operated within the realm of Canon Law, and were therefore instead concerned with distinctions between divine law, natural law, and human law. The "public/private" divide in law would not return until the 17th and 18th centuries. Through the emergence of the nation-state and new theories of sovereignty, notions of a distinctly public realm began to crystallize. However, the claims made by monarchs and, later, parliaments to unrestrained power to make law spurred attempts to establish a distinctly private sphere that would be free from encroaching State power.

== Public law in civil law and common law jurisdictions ==
Traditionally, the division between public and private law has been framed in the context of the legal systems of Continental Europe, whose laws all fall within the tradition of civil law. However, the public/private divide does not apply strictly to civil law systems. Given public law's emphasis on aspects of the State that are true of all systems of government and law, common law legal systems acknowledge, even if they do so unconsciously, that actions which the State must prohibit need not necessarily be prohibited for private parties as well. As such, legal scholars commenting on common law systems, such as England and Canada, have made this distinction as well.

For many years, public law occupied a marginal position in continental European law. By and large, private law was considered general law. Public law, on the other hand, was considered to consist of exceptions to this general law. It was not until the second half of the twentieth century that public law began to play a prominent role in European society through the constitutionalization of private law, as well as the development of administrative law and various functional fields of law, including labor law, medical law, and consumer law. Though this began to blur the distinction between public and private law, it did not erode the former. Instead, it elevated public law from its once-marginal state, acknowledging that few, if any, areas of the law are free from potential State intervention. In Italy, for example, the development of public law was considered a project of state-building, following the ideas of Vittorio Emanuele Orlando. Indeed, many early Italian public lawyers were also politicians, including Orlando himself. Now, in countries such as France, public law now refers to the areas of constitutional law, administrative law, and criminal law.

== Areas of public law ==
=== Constitutional law ===
In modern states, constitutional law lays out the foundations of the state. Above all, it postulates the supremacy of law in the state's functioning – the rule of law.

Secondly, it sets out the form of government – how its different branches work, how they are elected or appointed, and the division of powers and responsibilities between them. Traditionally, the basic elements of government are the executive, the legislature and the judiciary.

And thirdly, in describing what are the basic human rights, which must be protected for every person, and what further civil and political rights citizens have, it sets the fundamental borders to what any government must and must not do.

In most jurisdictions, constitutional law is enshrined in a written document, the constitution, sometimes together with amendments or other constitutional laws. In some countries, however, such a supreme entrenched written document does not exist for historical and political reasons – the Constitution of the United Kingdom is an unwritten one.

=== Administrative law ===
Administrative law refers to the body of law that regulates bureaucratic managerial procedures and defines the powers of administrative agencies. These laws are enforced by the executive branch of a government rather than the judicial or legislative branches (if they are different in that particular jurisdiction). This body of law regulates international trade, manufacturing, pollution, taxation, and the like. This is sometimes seen as a subcategory of civil law and sometimes seen as public law, as it deals with regulation and public institutions

=== Criminal law ===
Criminal law is the body of law that relates to crime. It prescribes conduct perceived as threatening, harmful, or otherwise endangering to the property, health, safety, and welfare of people, including oneself. Most criminal law is established by statute, which is to say that the laws are enacted by a legislature. Criminal law includes the punishment and rehabilitation of people who violate such laws.

=== Tax law ===
Tax law first became an area of public law in the 17th century, as a consequence of emerging theories of sovereignty. Until this point, taxes were considered gifts under the law, given to the State by a private donor – the taxpayer. It is now considered an area of public law, as it concerns a relationship between persons and the State.

== Theoretical distinction between private and public law ==
The analytical and historical distinction between public and private law has emerged predominantly in the legal systems of continental Europe. As a result, German-language legal literature has produced extensive discussion on the precise nature of the distinction between public law and private law. Several theories have evolved, which are neither exhaustive nor mutually exclusive or separate.

The interest theory of public law emerges from the work of Roman jurist Ulpian, who stated "Publicum ius est, quod ad statum rei Romanae spectat, privatum quod ad singulorum utilitatem. (Public law is that which concerns the Roman state, and private law is concerned with the interests of citizens.) Charles-Louis Montesquieu elaborates upon this theory in The Spirit of the Laws, published during the 18th century, wherein Montesquieu establishes a distinction between international (right of nations), public (political right), and private (civil right) law according to various actors' interests and rights. There, he writes: "Considered as inhabitants of a planet so large that different peoples are necessary, they have laws bearing on the relation that these peoples have with one another, and this is the right of nations. Considered as living in a society that must be maintained, they have laws concerning the relation between those who govern and those who are governed, and this is the political right. Further, they have laws concerning the relation that all citizens have with one another, and this is the civil right."

Criticisms of interest theory include the difficulty of establishing a clear distinction between private and public interest, if such a distinction exists, and of categorizing laws accordingly.

The subjection theory explains the distinction by emphasizing the subordination of private persons to the state. Public law is supposed to govern this relationship, whereas private law is considered to govern relationships in which the parties meet on a level playing field. However, some areas commonly considered private law also imply subordination, such as employment law. Moreover, legal proceedings wherein the State is a party may undermine the totality of the State's authority, and the degree to which private persons are subordinate to the State if a Court finds in favor of a non-state party (see Carpenter v. United States, for example).

The subject theory concerns the position of the subject of law within the legal relationship in question. If it finds itself in a particular situation as a public person (due to membership in some public body, such as a state or a municipality), public law applies; otherwise, it is private law.

A combination of the subjection theory and the subject theory arguably provides a workable distinction. Under this approach, a field of law is considered public law where one actor is a public authority endowed with the power to act unilaterally (imperium), and this actor uses that imperium in the particular relationship. In other words, it all depends on whether the public authority is acting as a public or private entity, for example, when ordering office supplies. This latest theory considers public law a special instance.

There are areas of law that do not seem to fit into either public or private law, such as employment law – parts of it look like private law (the employment contract) while other parts look like public law (the activities of an employment inspectorate when investigating workplace safety).

The distinction between public and private law bears on the delineation of the competencies of different courts and administrative bodies. Under the Austrian constitution, for example, private law is among the exclusive competencies of federal legislation, whereas public law is partly a matter of state legislation.

== See also ==
- Social law

== Notes ==
=== References ===
- Aquinas, Thomas (2000). Treatise on Law. Indianapolis, IN: Hackett Publishing Company. ISBN 978-0-87220-548-2.
- Bell, John; Boyron, Sophie; Whittaker, Sophie (2008). Principles of French Law. Oxford, UK: Oxford University Press. pp. 141–240. ISBN 9780199541393.
- Casini, Lorenzo; Cassese, Sabino; Napolitano, Giulio (April 2011). "The New Italian Public Law Scholarship". International Journal of Constitutional Law. 9 (2): 302–303. doi:10.1093/icon/mor049.
- Cherednychenko, Olha (April 18, 2007). Fundamental Rights, Contract Law, and Protection of the Weaker Party. Utrecht, Netherlands: Utrecht University Institute for Legal Studies. hdl:1874/20945.
- Cohen, Morris (1927). "Property and Sovereignty". Cornell Law Review. 13 (1): 8.
- Forcese, Craig; Dodek, Adam; Bryant, Philip; Carver, Peter; Haigh, Richard; Liston, Mary; MacIntosh, Constance (2015). Public Law: Cases, Commentary and Analysis (Third ed.). Toronto, ON: Emond Montgomery Publishing Ltd. p. 4. ISBN 978-1-55239-664-3.
- Vincenzo Ferraro, Il diritto pubblico ed amministrativo per le lauree delle scienze umane e della formazione primaria. Alcuni lineamenti essenziali, Torino, 2023.
- Horwitz, Morton (1982). "The History of the Public/Private Distinction" (PDF). University of Pennsylvania Law Review. 130 (6): 1423–1428. doi:10.2307/3311976. JSTOR 3311976. S2CID 51854776.
- Jakab, András (2006). European Constitutional Language. Cambridge, UK: Cambridge University Press. pp. 387–400. ISBN 978-1-107-13078-4.
- Justinian; Watson, Alan (1985). The Digest of Justinian. Vol. 1. Philadelphia, PA: University of Pennsylvania Press. ISBN 978-0-8122-2033-9.
- Kantorowicz, Ernst (May 10, 2016). The King's Two Bodies: A Study in Medieval Theology. Princeton, NJ: Princeton University Press. ISBN 978-0-691-16923-1.
- Martin, Elizabeth A. (2003). Oxford Dictionary of Law. Oxford: Oxford University Press. ISBN 0198607563.
- Murkens, Jo Eric Khushal (July 15, 2009). "The Quest for Constitutionalism in UK Public Law Discourse". Oxford Journal of Legal Studies. 29 (3): 427–455. doi:10.1093/ojls/gqp020.
- Montesquieu, Charles-Louis de Secondat, Baron de La Brède et de (1989). The Spirit of the Laws. Cambridge, UK: Cambridge University Press. ISBN 978-0-521-36183-5.
- Vértesy, László (2007). "The Place and Theory of Banking Law - Or Arising of a New Branch of Law: Law of Financial Industries". Collega. 2-3. XI. SSRN 3198092.
