= Friedrich Lange (journalist) =

German journalist (1852–1917)

- Born: 10 January 1852; Goslar, Kingdom of Hanover
- Died: 26 December 1917 (aged 65); Detmold, Principality of Lippe, Germany
- Education: Doctorate in philosophy
- Alma mater: University of Göttingen
- Occupations: Teacher; Journalist
- Years active: 1890-1912
- Known for: Völkisch writer and polemicist
- Political party: Nationalen Reichswahlverband; Reichsverband gegen die Sozialdemokratie
- Movement: Deutschbund

Friedrich Lange (born 10 January 1852 – 26 December 1917) was a German journalist and political activist with the Völkisch movement. Seeking to move beyond existing romantic nationalism, Lange sought to build a wider nationalist ideology on the German political right by marrying anti-Semitism to other economic and social issues. He would prove an influential figure for groups that followed.

== Early years ==
After taking a doctorate in ancient philosophy at the University of Göttingen in 1873, Lange taught at a preparatory school before taking up journalism in the 1880s. He became editor of the conservative daily Tägliche Rundschau in 1890 and then in 1895 the Deutsche Zeitung. He would also edit the Zeitschrift für die Reform der höheren Schulen. An early disciple of Paul de Lagarde, Lange was part of the Burschenschaft movement and absorbed the strong strain of German nationalism rife within that tendency.

In the 1890s Lange became convinced that the Jewish influence in schools was too strong and he played a leading role in organising a petition for school reform, aimed at increasing the teaching of German studies and minimising Jewish influence through the School Reform Association, which he led with Theodor Peters. He was also close to Carl Peters and the Society for German Colonization.

== Ideology ==
Lange was strongly anti-Semitic in outlook, but was also highly critical of the anti-Semitic parties that had been formed in Germany, decrying them for their rabble-rousing, their attempts to build a mass movement and their lack of any coherent platform beyond crude Jew-baiting. Rejecting party politics, he felt the Völkisch movement needed to influence the upper echelons of society in order to succeed, offering deeper ideas that would inevitably include anti-Semitism, but also place influence what he saw as the positivity of German identity, rather than just negative attacks on the Jews. His idea of "pure Germanism" would marry anti-Semitism to nationalism, glorification of war as an aim of state, territorial expansion, autarchy and the preservation of the traditional Mittelstand through economic reform.

As well as the Jews, whom he targeted through calls for boycotts of their businesses and laws against marriage to Christians, he was also strongly opposed to socialism and the Roman Catholic Church. He was strongly critical of the rise of capitalism in Germany, with his 1893 play Der Nachtse exploring anti-capitalist themes and indeed he was known to use the term "national socialism" for his preferred economic vision. Lange was also critical of the ideas of Ernst Moritz Arndt and Friedrich Ludwig Jahn, describing their reactionary romantic nationalism as "self deceiving" and instead coming out in favour of scientific progress as part of his overall vision.

== Deutschbund ==
To this end in 1894 he established the Deutschbund, a völkisch group with a small elite membership. With a clandestine structure made up of only well educated members of the upper middle classes, it had at its peak only 1,100 members but exercised wide influence due to the leading positions in society occupied by those who had joined. Heinrich Class, whose Pan-German League would go on to become the most important far right group in pre-1914 Germany, claimed that his entire Völkisch outlook was shaped by his time in the Deutschbund. Lange shared much of the League's ideology, although he was never a formal member of the group. His ideas were also an important influence on the development of the Wandervogel movement. Unlike most other groups operating in this sphere the Deutschbund was not closed down in 1933 and continued limited operations in Nazi Germany.

== Later years ==
In 1902 he established the Nationalen Reichswahlverband as an attempt to co-ordinate non-socialist political parties into a single group. This however proved fairly short-lived as it was absorbed by the wider Reichsverband gegen die Sozialdemokratie in 1905. He also gave his support to the German Eastern Marches Society, becoming a member of the group.

He retired from political life in 1912 and died in 1917.
