= Anna von Gierke =

Member of the Weimar National Assembly
- In office 1919–1920

Personal details
- Born: 14 March 1874; Breslau, Germany
- Died: 3 April 1943 (aged 69); Berlin, Germany

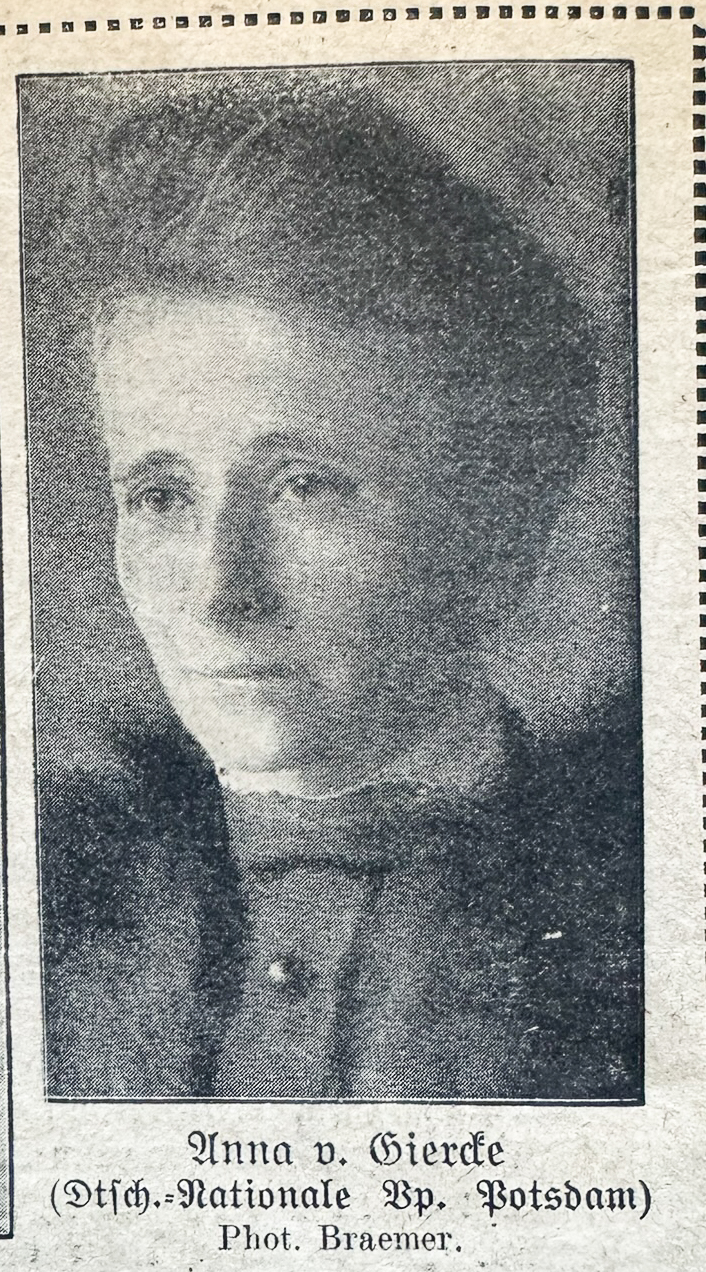
Anna von Gierke, member of the Weimar National Assembly 1919

Anna von Gierke (14 March 1874 – 3 April 1943) was a German social pedagogue and politician. In 1919 she was one of the 36 women elected to the Weimar National Assembly, the first female parliamentarians in Germany. She remained a member of parliament until the following year.

== Biography ==
Von Gierke was born in Breslau in 1874, the oldest of six children of the historian Otto von Gierke and Lili von Gierke (née Loening), who was involved in voluntary welfare work. Her sister Hildegarde also became a social pedagogue, brother Julius became a law professor and Edgar became a pathologist. She attended high school in Heidelberg and Berlin, after which she started working as an assistant in a youth home in Charlottenburg. She was appointed manager of a girl's day care centre in 1892, and in 1898 became head of the Jugendheim association. She opened a social education seminary in 1911, which provided training for people to become after-school carers and school carers.

She co-founded the Association for Schoolchild Care in 1912, soon becoming its chair. From 1914 she worked as an inspector of afterschool centres for the Prussian Ministry of Culture. In 1915 she founded the Charlottenburg Housewives Association, and in 1918 became a member of the board of the Reich Association of German Housewives' Associations. During World War I she joined the War Office as an expert in child welfare, carrying out inspection visits.

After World War I she was elected to the Weimar National Assembly in 1919 as a representative of the German National People's Party (DNVP). During her term in office she chaired the Population Policy Committee. However, the DNVP did not re-nominate her for the 1920 elections due to her Jewish roots (her mother was Jewish). Following a scandal, her father resigned from the party and she also resigned. She subsequently set up her own party, the Independent Women's List, which contested 1920 Berlin state election but failed to win a seat.

Together with Martha Abicht, in 1921 von Gierke established the Finkenkrug youth home in Falkensee. She became a member of the board of the Bund Deutscher Frauenvereine in 1931. However, two years later she was dismissed from her posts due her Jewish heritage.

She subsequently joined the Confessing Church. At her apartment on Carmerstrasse in Charlottenburg, Berlin, she organised lectures on religion, politics, and history and held Bible study groups. Visitors to her home included Alice Salomon, Hermann Maas, Martin Niemöller, Helmut Gollwitzer, and Agnes von Zahn-Harnack, all of whom were opposed to or were persecuted by the Nazis. After the Nazis came to power, she also provided assistance to "submerged" Jews who were living illegally while attempting to avoid deportation. She helped them obtain ration stamps and accommodation, and assisted with attempts to escape from Germany; through her efforts, some of them were able to use the Finkenkrug youth home as a hiding place.

Heart attacks led to her death on 3 April 1943 at her Charlottenburg apartment. She was buried at the Kaiser Wilhelm Memorial Cemetery.
