= Social law =

Unified concept of law

Social law is a unified concept of law, which replaces the classical division of public law and private law. The term has both been used to mean fields of law that fall between "core" private and public subjects, such as corporate law, competition law, labour law and social security, or as a unified concept for the whole of the law based on associations.

In reaction to classical jurisprudence in the 19th century, legal scholars questioned a rigid divide between private law and public law. The German legal philosopher, Otto von Gierke worked to develop a comprehensive history and theory of "social law" (Soziales Recht). Key tenets of Gierke's work were adopted and brought into English jurisprudence by Frederick W. Maitland. In France, Léon Duguit developed the concept of social law in his 1911 book, Le droit social, le droit individuel et la transformation de l’état. A common thread has been an attachment to social justice in a democratic society. This became central to the thinking of American legal realists during the Lochner era of the early 20th century.

== See also ==
- Justice
- Court
- International law
- Legal philosophy
- Sociology of law
- Private law and public law
- Law
- Natural law
