= Emil Frommel =

German writer and theologian (1828–1896)

Emil Frommel

Emil Frommel (1828–1896) was a German pastor and author, born at Karlsruhe. He studied at Halle upon Saale, Erlangen, and Heidelberg, held several pastorates, served as army chaplain in the Franco-German War of 1870–1871 and in 1872 was appointed court preacher at Berlin and pastor of the garrison in that city.

== Life ==
Emil Frommel was born on 5 January 1828 at Karlsruhe in the then Grand Duchy of Baden, Southern Germany. His father was director of the ducal art gallery. He studied theology at the universities of Halle, Erlangen, and Heidelberg before being appointed as vicar in Alt-Lussheim, near Schwetzingenin 1850. Four years later, he became vicar in his hometown and this was followed by a move in 1864 to Barmen in Westphalia.

His next appointment, in 1869, was as pastor in the Garnisonkirche in Berlin. His role as a field chaplain meant that he travelled to France with the army when the Franco-Prussian War began in the following summer. He marked the German victory on his return to the Garnisonkirche in 1871, delivering a sermon commemorating the dead in the presence of the German Emperor and other royalty. He was later appointed chaplain to the Imperial Court and between 1872 and 1887 he accompanied the Emperor on annual visits to Wildbad Gastein in the Austrian Alps.

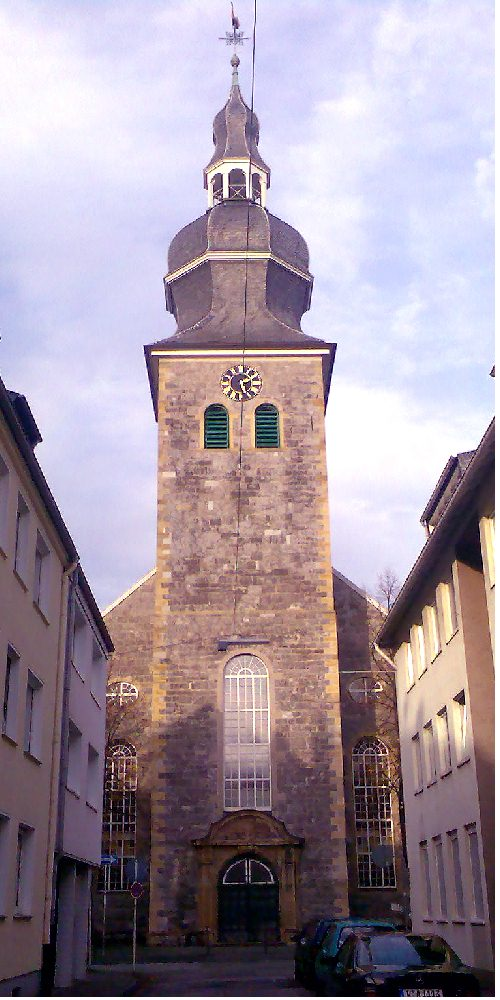
Alte Kirche, Frommel's parish in Barmen.

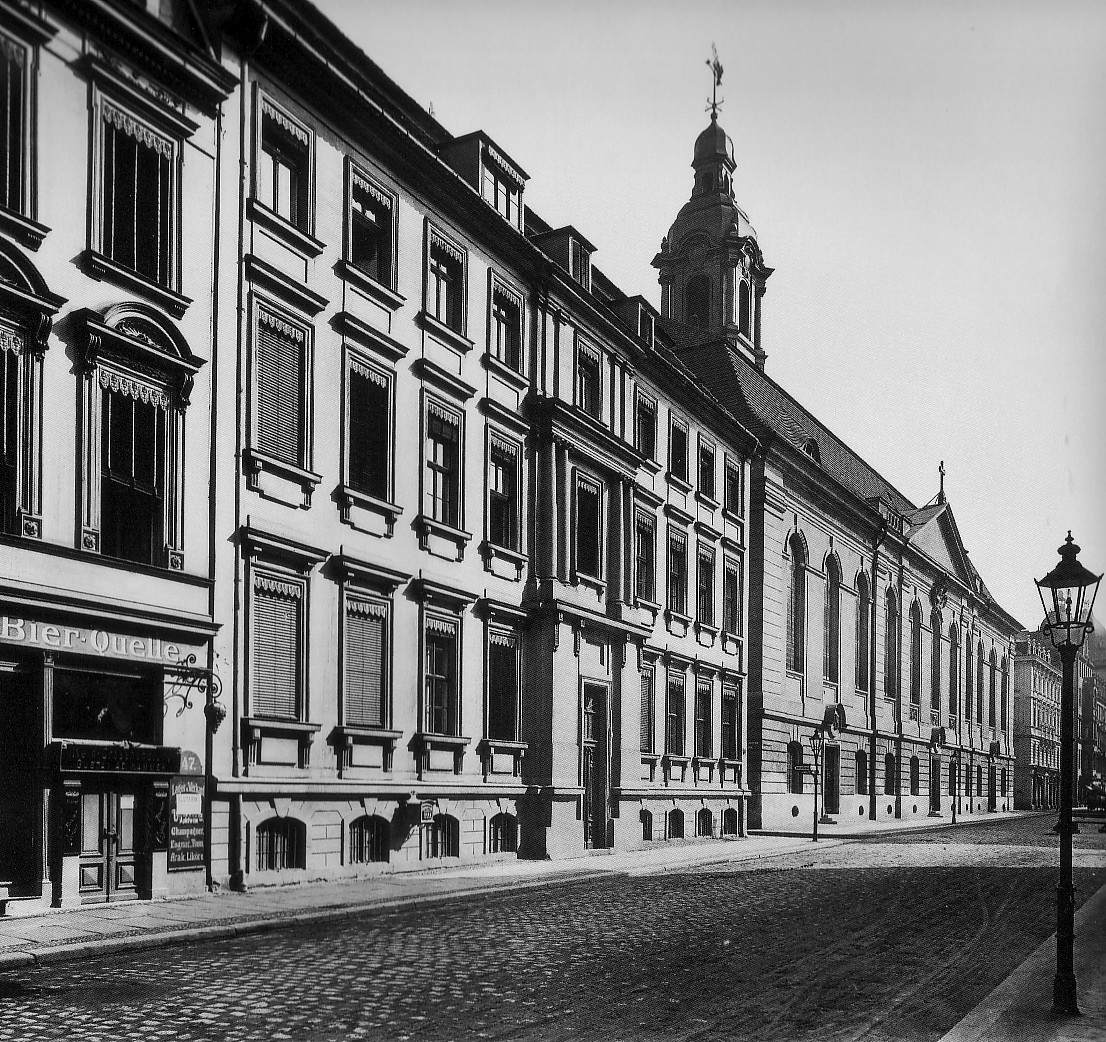
Berlin's old Garrison Church in then Neue Friedrichstraße (now Anna-Louisa-Karsch-Str.), 1910.

Aside from the Imperial court, Frommel was admired within the higher echelons of Berlin society and was in demand to conduct christenings, weddings and funerals. He gave sermons at the funerals of many who had led in the 1870-171 war, including Prince August of Württemberg, Moltke, Roon, Alvensleben, Kirchbach, and Kameke. He was also respected among the more common people among the populace and integrated well in the northern city despite his southern origins.

On the 25th anniversary of his appointment as pastor of the Garnisonkirche, Frommel requested and was allowed retirement. In his final sermon on 19 April 1896, he claimed that "While in Berlin, I have baptized 1838 children, united in wedlock 1526 couples, confirmed 1980 school-children, and buried 1709 dead. Of the churches in Berlin, I have preached in all but one, and in sixty-five cities all over Germany I have delivered either sermons or lectures."

He was commissioned by Imperial brevet as an "officer à la suite of the army," - a distinction never previously conferred upon a military chaplain in Germany — and in 1896 he was appointed by Wilhelm II to teach the two oldest royal sons at Plön Castle in the province of Schleswig-Holstein. After a few months' stay at Plön, which was an idyllic setting, the return of an old ailment necessitated a medical procedure. He died on 9 November 1896, aged 68, while undergoing the operation.

Frommel was friendly with three generations of German royalty, being Wilhelm I, his son Friedrich, and his grandson, Wilhelm II. He was Supreme Councillor of the Prussian Consistory. He died on 9 November 1896.

== Works ==
His principal theological works include:

- Die zehn Gebote Gottes in Predigten (sixth edition, 1898)
- In drei Stufen, an anthology (eighth edition, 1890)
- Festflammen, (sixth edition, 1896)
- Das Gebet des Herrn in Predigten (fourth edition, 1893)

He also wrote tales and miscellaneous essays, collected and published under the title of Gesammelte Schriften, Erzählungen für das Volk, Aufsätze und Vorträge (1873–1897).
