= Edgar von Gierke =

German physician

Edgar Otto Conrad von Gierke (9 February 1877, in Breslau – 21 October 1945, in Karlsruhe) was a German Jewish pathologist who specialized in glycogenesis and discovered glycogen storage disease type I (formerly known as von Gierke disease) in 1929.

== Early life ==
Edgar was born in 1877 the Prussian province of Silesia in Breslau to a famous Pomeranian German family. He was the son of the noted legal scholar Otto von Gierke and Marie Caecilie Elise (Lili) née Loening (1850–1936). Edgar had a sister named Anna von Gierke and a brother named Julius. Marie was an Evangelical Christian but her parents had converted from Judaism to Christianity in the 1840s prior to her birth. Thus, under the racial laws of German Nazi rule, she was considered to be Jewish as was Edgar, who identified as a Protestant. As a result, Edgar was labeled "Mischling 1. Grades" ("half-breed 1st degree") by the Nazi party.

In 1896, von Gierke served one year as a military volunteer in the Silesian Field Artillery Regiment and subsequently served as a staff surgeon of the reserve during World War I. He participated in the Battle of Lorraine.

== Education and career ==
He received his medical doctorate at Heidelberg University in 1901 and became a lecturer at the University of Freiburg in 1904. Several years later he became a prosector at the municipal hospital in Karlsruhe. In 1908, von Gierke took over the managing position of the Pathological-Bacteriological Institute of the Karlsruhe Municipal Hospitals for his colleague Ernst Schwalbe and retained this position for nearly 30 years. In 1911, von Gierke also became an associate professor of bacteriology at the Technische Hochschule in Karlsruhe. During his career, he published the highly regarded on anatomy book Taschenbuch der pathologischen Anatomie (Pocketbook of Pathological Anatomy).

=== von Gierke disease ===
von Gierke published a seminal article in 1929 detailing his discovery of a newly described glycogen storage disease that affected the liver and kidneys that he discovered on an autopsy of an affected child. He originally termed the disease "Hepato-Nephromegalia glykogenica". von Gierke's accomplishment was later rewarded and the disease was later given the eponymous distinction of being known as von Gierke disease, which was subsequently renamed to glycogen storage disease type I.

=== Nazi Germany ===
von Gierke was forced to prematurely retire by the Nazi's Third Reich in September 1937 and subsequently forced to come out of retirement and manage the pathology department at the Karlsruhe municipal hospital due to a lack of personnel. He was again forcibly retired in 1940 when Richard Böhmig, whom he temporarily replaced while Böhmig served in World War II, returned to his service at the municipal hospital after being discharged from his military service.

von Gierke's views on the Nazi party are poorly understood due to a lack of information. A few letters that von Gierke signed "Heil Hitler" have been recovered and on a Nazi party-administered political questionnaire he stated that he was a member of the Nazi groups known as the German Labor Front, the Reichsbund der Deutschen Beamten (Reich's Union of German Civil Servants), and the National Socialist German Doctors' League, but it is thought by modern history scholars that such membership and actions were a result of political pressure and expectations rather than due to truly sympathizing with the Nazi party.

== Personal life ==
He married Julie Braun in 1912 and fathered four children. One of his son, Henning von Gierke, become an eminent acoustical engineer and scientist.

In 1945, von Gierke died from an unknown progressive heart disease at the age of 68.

== Awards ==
For his military service as a surgeon during World War I, von Gierke received the Iron Cross 1st and 2nd class and the Knight's Cross 2nd class as well as swords of the Order of the Zähringer Lion. A street in Karslruhe was named after him in his honor.
