= Adolph Hausrath =

German theologian

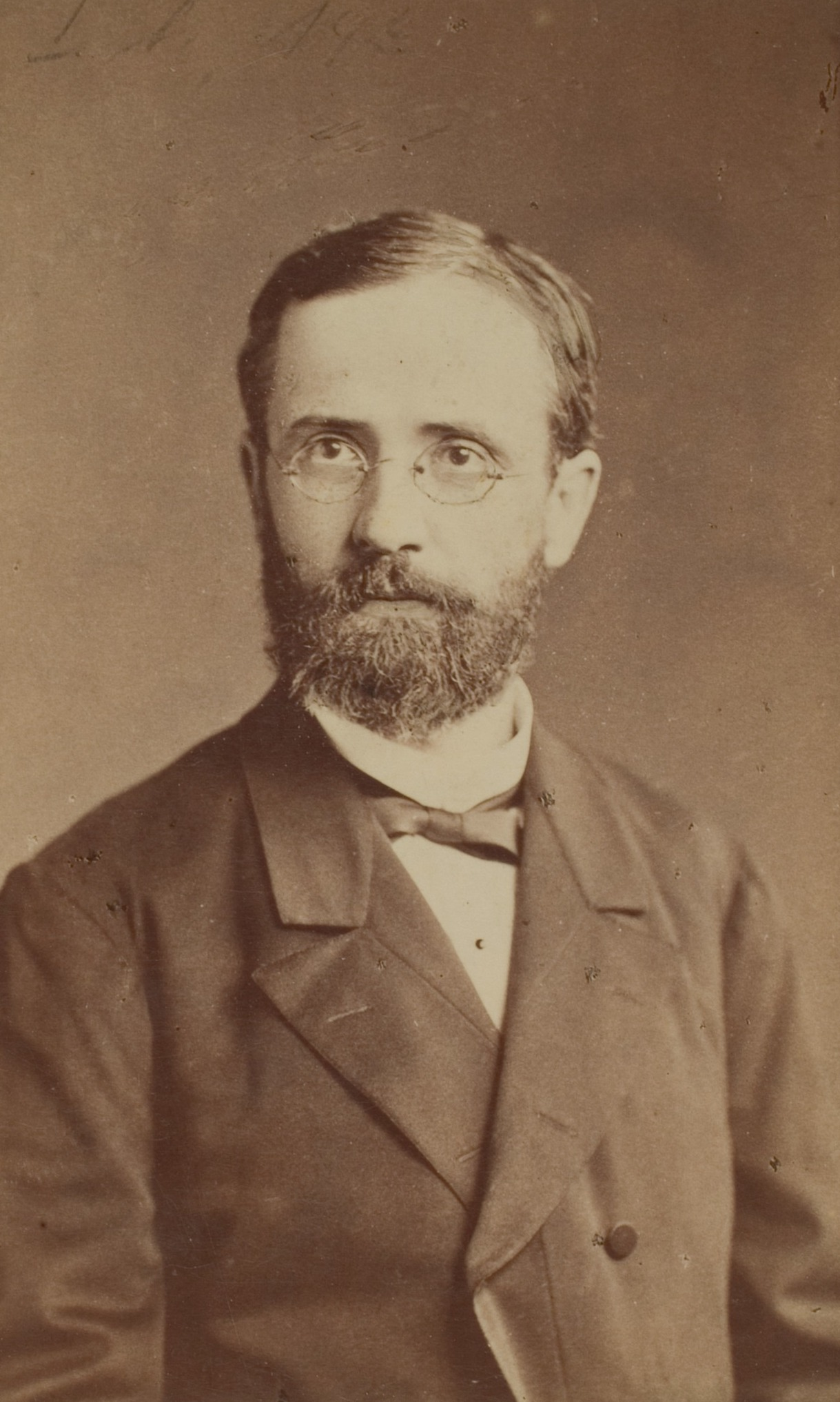
Adolph Hausrath

Adolf Hausrath (13 January 1837 – 2 August 1909), a German theologian, was born at Karlsruhe.

== Biography ==
He was educated at Jena, Göttingen, Berlin and Heidelberg, where he became Privatdozent in 1861, professor extraordinary in 1867 and ordinary professor in 1872. He was a disciple of the Tübingen school and a strong Protestant. His scholarship was sound and his style vigorous.

Hausrath died on 3 August 1909 in Heidelberg.

== Works ==
Among other works he wrote Der Apostel Paulus (1865), Neutestamentliche Zeitgeschichte (1868–1873, 4 vols; Eng. trans.), D. F. Strauss und die Theologie seiner Zeit (1876-1878, 2 vols), and lives of Richard Rothe (2 vols, 1902), and Luther (1904).

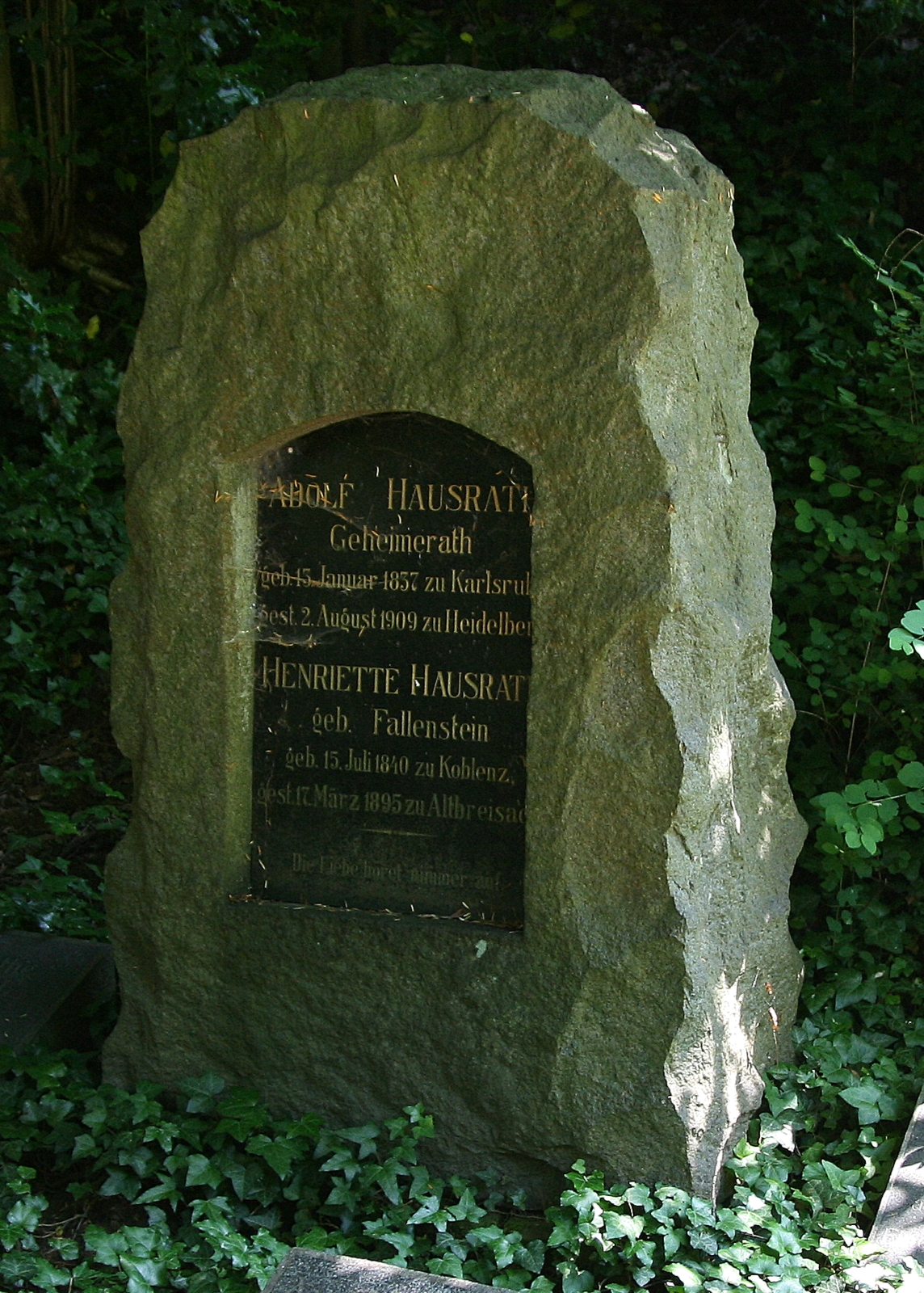
His grave in Heidelberg

Under the pseudonym George Taylor he wrote several historical romances, especially Antinous (1880), which quickly ran through five editions, and is the story of a soul "which courted death because the objective restraints of faith had been lost." Klytia (1883) was a 16th-century story, Samen (1884) a fictional work of 19th century Germany, Jetta (1885) a tale of the great immigrations, and Elfriede "a romance of the Rhine".
