= Wilhelm Fleischmann =

German agriculturist and chemist (1837–1920)

Wilhelm Fleischmann (31 December 1837 in Erlangen – 13 January 1920 in Göttingen) was a German agriculturist and chemist. He is known for his work on the chemistry of milk.

== Biography ==
He received his education at Nuremberg, Würzburg, Erlangen and Munich. In Justus von Liebig's laboratory in 1862, he began work on agricultural chemistry, and in 1864-67 while teaching in the Realschule at Memmingen conducted experiments there. From 1867 to 1876, he was principal of the Realschule at Lindau and for the following 10 years directed the first dairy experiment station of Germany, in the vicinity of Lalendorf, Mecklenburg. From 1886 to 1896, he was director of the Agricultural Institute at Königsberg and of that at Göttingen after 1896. He did important work in the chemistry of milk.

== Writings ==
His works include: Handbuch des Molkereiwesens (1876), Altgermanische und altrömische Agrarverhaltnisse (1906), Lehrbuch der Milkwirtschaft (1908; English and Russian translations), and Cäsar, Tacitus, Karl der Grösse, und die deutsche Landwirtschaft (1911).
