= Rudolf Haym =

German philosopher (1821–1901)

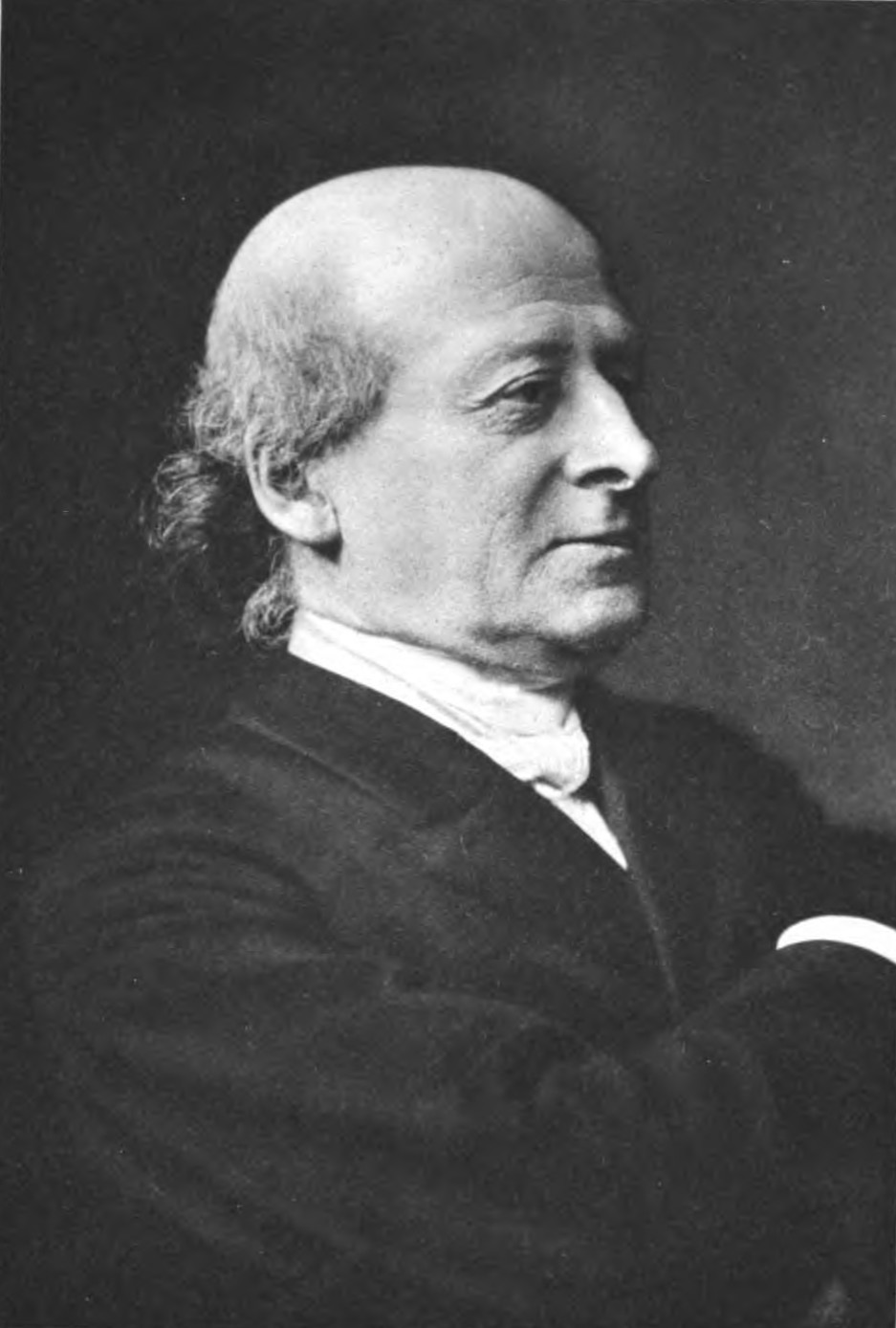
- Born: October 5, 1821; Grünberg, Kingdom of Prussia (now Zielona Góra, Poland)
- Died: August 27, 1901 (aged 79); St Anton am Arlberg, Austria-Hungary (now Austria)

Rudolf Haym (5 October 1821 – 27 August 1901) was a German philosopher.

He was born in Grünberg in Prussia (now Zielona Góra, Poland), and died in St. Anton (Arlberg). He studied philosophy and theology at Halle and Berlin.

He was a member of the National Assembly at Frankfurt in 1848, and wrote an account of the proceedings from the standpoint of the Right Centre. From 1851 he lectured in literature and philosophy at the University of Halle, and became professor in 1860.

His writings are biographical and critical, devoted mainly to German philosophy and literature. In 1870 he published a history of the Romantic school. He also wrote biographies of Wilhelm von Humboldt (1856), Hegel (1857), Schopenhauer (1864), Herder (1877–1885) and Max Duncker (1890). In 1901 he published Erinnerungen aus meinem Leben ("Recollections from My Life").

Attribution
