= Albert Döderlein =

German obstetrician and gynecologist

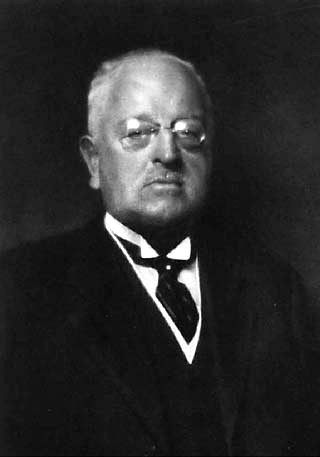
Albert Döderlein

Albert Sigmund Gustav Döderlein (5 July 1860, Augsburg – 10 December 1941, Munich) was a German obstetrician and gynecologist. He was the father of gynecologist Gustav Döderlein.

== Biography ==
He studied medicine at the University of Erlangen, and from 1893 to 1897 was an associate professor of gynecology and obstetrics at Leipzig University. Afterwards, he was a full professor at the University of Groningen (1897), the University of Tübingen (from 1897 to 1907), and the Ludwig-Maximilians-Universität München (from 1907 to 1934).

== Contributions ==
He is considered one the founders of gynecological bacteriology. He was among the first to use radiotherapeutics in cancer therapy and is credited with introducing rubber gloves in obstetrics and gynecology. His name is associated with the Döderlein vaginal bacillus, a large, gram-positive bacterium that he first described in 1892.

== Published works ==
- Leitfaden für den geburtshilflichen Operationskurs, Leipzig 1893.
- Über Vergangenheit und Gegenwart der Geburtshülfe, Leipzig 1897.
- Operative Gynäkologie, Leipzig 1905; (with Bernhard Krönig).
- Handbuch der Geburtshilfe, 4 volumes, Wiesbaden 1915–1921.
