= Otto von Gierke =

German legal scholar and historian (1841–1921)

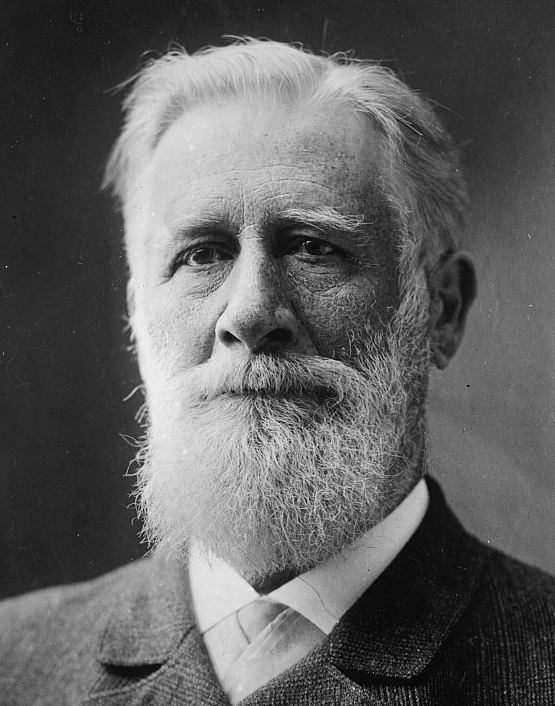
- Born: 11 January 1841; Stetin, Pomerania, German Empire
- Died: 10 October 1921 (aged 80); Berlin, Weimar Republic
- Education: University of Berlin
- Employer: University of Berlin
- Spouse: Marie Caecilie Elise (Lili) née Loening
- Children: Julius von Gierke; Edgar von Gierke; Anna von Gierke
- Parents: Julius Gierke (father); Therese Zitelmann (mother)

Otto Friedrich von Gierke, born Otto Friedrich Gierke (11 January 1841 – 10 October 1921), was a German legal scholar and historian. He is considered today as one of the most influential and important legal scholars of the 19th and 20th centuries. In his four-volume magnum opus entitled Das deutsche Genossenschaftsrecht (German Law of Associations), he pioneered the study of social groups and the importance of associations in German life, which stood between the divide of private and public law.

During his career at Berlin University's law department, Gierke was a leading critic of the first draft of a new civil code for Imperial Germany. Gierke argued that it had been molded in an individualistic frame that was inconsistent with German social traditions. Gierke became known as a vocal Germanist within the German Historical School of Jurisprudence. The draft was revised to remove Roman law influences and the German Civil Code came into effect in 1900.

== Career ==
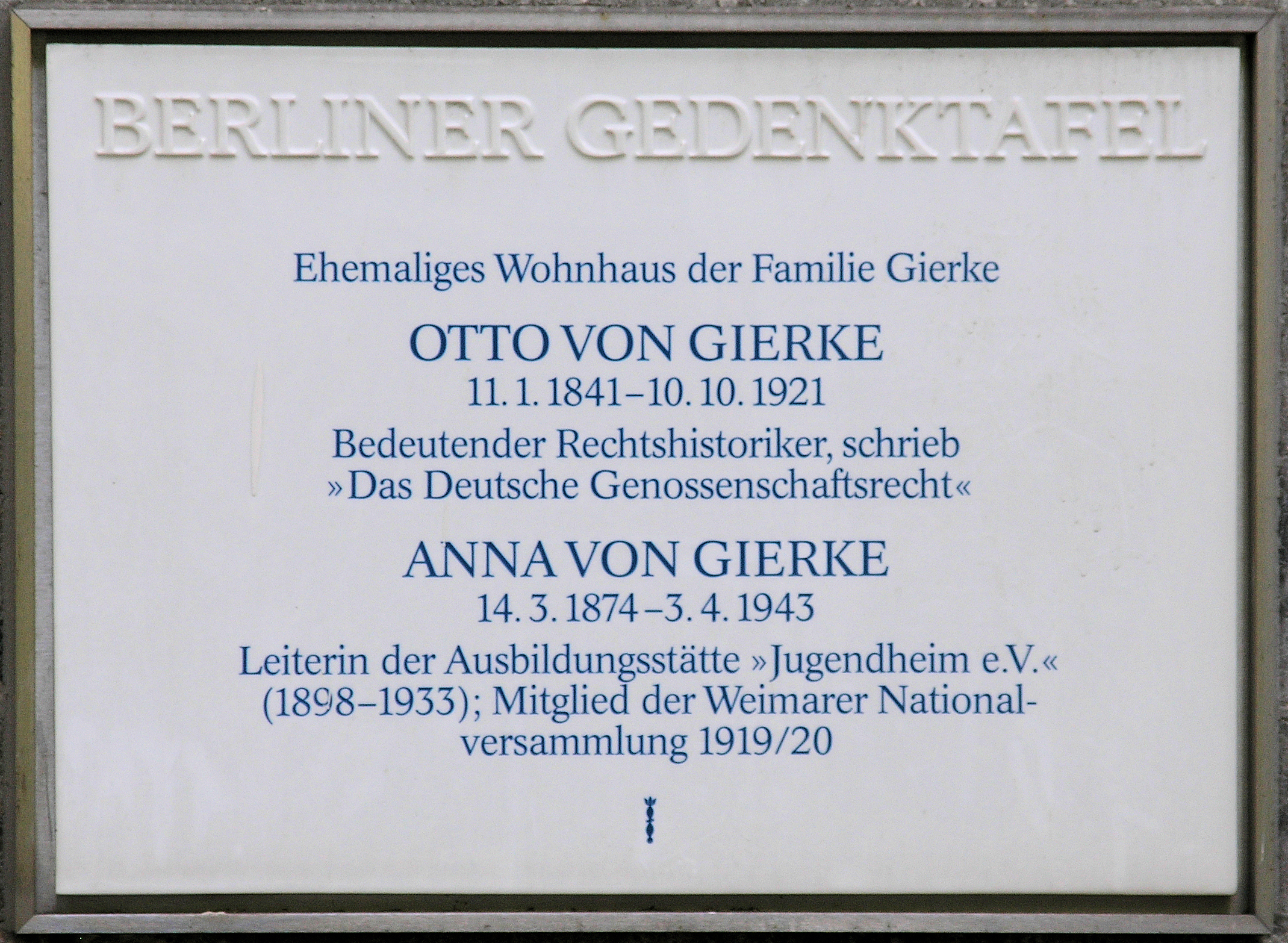
Berlin memorial plaque, Otto and Anna von Gierke, Carmerstraße 12, Berlin-Charlottenburg, Germany

In 1841 Otto Friedrich Gierke was born in Stettin (Szczecin), Pomerania, as the son of a Prussian civil servant. He was ennobled with a hereditary title on his 70th birthday in 1911, becoming Otto von Gierke at the climax of his long academic career. The young Gierke studied at the universities of Heidelberg and Berlin. In Berlin, he was taught by Georg Beseler, a jurist and member of the Prussian House of Lords. Beseler was an expert on German law and Gierke received his doctorate for a thesis on the obligations arising from medieval fiefdom (Lebensschulden).

After serving in the 1866 Austro-Prussian War as a lieutenant, Gierke returned to Berlin to pursue an academic career. In 1868 he published his professorial dissertation on the legal history of the German cooperative (Rechtsgeschichte der deutschen Genossenschaft). Gierke argued that the cooperative was at the center of German communal order since ancient times and that the Germanic sense of justice set Germanic law apart from Roman law. Gierke established his reputation as foremost academic expert on Germanic jurisprudence in 1868, when he published the first volume of The German Law of Associations (Das Deutsche Genossenschaftsrecht). Gierke was encouraged to publish at the insistence of Theodor Mommsen. Gierke worked as a private lecturer in Berlin and served in the 1870 Franco-Prussian War. He was appointed as adjunct professor in 1871 after returning from military service. The second volume of The German Law of Associations (Das Deutsche Genossenschaftsrecht) was published in 1873, a third volume was published in 1881, the fourth and final volume was published in 1913.

Gierke had a distinguished academic career. In 1872, the University of Breslau appointed him as a regular professor. While serving as acting rector, Gierke became prominent in academic circles for his research on Johannes Althusius. In his publications, Gierke asserted that Althusius' theory of the state as a social organism based on associations amounted to a native German tradition of social contract and sovereignty. From 1884 until 1887 he held a professorship at Heidelberg University and he served as professor at the prestigious Friedrich Wilhelm University in Berlin from 1887 until his death in 1921.

=== Influence on the 1900 civil code ===
Gierke became a vocal critic of the 1888 draft for a civil code to harmonize private law on property, family, and obligations, following the Unification of Germany in 1871. Imperial Germany under Otto von Bismarck consisted of 25 federal states with legal systems based on Roman law, customary law that had developed out of Germanic law, as well as elements of the Napoleonic Code. Gierke opposed the 1888 draft for a new civil code because parts of it were based on Roman law. In the course of the academic debate on the draft, Gierke emerged as an outspoken Germanist within the German Historical School of Jurisprudence.

Gierke formulated a historic critique of the draft civil code by relying on ancient and medieval German laws that the jurist and folklorist Jacob Grimm had collected on the municipality (Gemeinde) and the Mark currency. Gierke plausibly argued that the legal norms found in feudal contracts, town charters, as well as the letters patent governing merchant and craft guilds amounted to a native Germanic legal tradition. Throughout 1888 and 1889 Gierke criticized the draft civil code in articles that were published in the leading German language economics journal. Its editor Gustav von Schmoller took the view that the norms of the Roman law tradition did not adequately support the business models of a market economy that was industrialized. Gierke further bolstered his critique of the draft civil code by publishing the first of a three-volume opus on German private law (Deutsches Privatrecht) in 1895.

The first draft civil code was revised to remove Roman law influences and a further draft was published in 1896. It did not consider the social needs of its times and prompted Gierke to publish his most quoted criticism of the German civil code: "In our private law a drop of social oil has to seep through!". Gierke was especially opinionated when criticizing the tenancy law in the new draft for ignoring the burning issues in modern German cities. He demanded that the German civil code should protect tenants against usury by placing legal restrictions on the freedom of contract. Gierke's demands for social laws to be enshrined in the draft went unheard. The new German Civil Code came into effect in 1900.

=== Influence on the 1919 Weimar Constitution ===
In 1905 Gierke published the second volume on German private law (Deutsches Privatrecht) offering a detailed critique of the unrestrained freedom that was guaranteed to the owners of private property in §903 of the German Civil Code. According to the law: "the owner of a thing can, so far as not contrary to law or the rights of third parties, deal with the thing at discretion and exclude others from every use or misuse of it." Gierke railed against §903, arguing that property ownership was subject to limitations because it confers powers bound by rights. He maintained that according to German legal principle, property ownership is pervaded by responsibilities. While Gierke's influence on legislation was limited, his lectures and publications became influential at German language universities. Gierke's views on the social obligations arising from property ownership were eventually enshrined in the 1919 Weimar Constitution, which stated in Article 153 that "Property ownership carries an obligation. Its use shall also serve the best interest of the community". The proposal for the constitution had been prepared by Hugo Preuss, a former student of Gierke.

Gierke remained a committed nationalist throughout his life. He was deeply disappointed about Germany's military defeat in World War I and the terms of the Treaty of Versailles. In May 1919 at the age of seventy-eight Gierke rallied his academic colleagues to build a new Germany based on Germanic traditions: "We are a people, with thousands of years of history". Gierke recapitulated his vision for the new parliamentary republic as a state based on "national identity" and with "historical foundation". He declared that the state in Germany should remain an organically built community along Germanic traditions, where municipalities and local governments are autonomous and derive their legal existence from the association of citizens. He continued: "It should be a welfare state. Social but not socialist!". To this end, the German state should remain a cultured state subject to the rule of law. In what would become his last public lecture, Gierke set out the principles that were to infuse the constitutional law of the fledgling Weimar Republic.

== Influence on pluralism ==
In Britain, interest in Gierke's views were generated when the British historian of law Frederic William Maitland published a partial translation of Gierke's 1881 four volume opus on the German law of association (Das deutsche Genossenschaftsrecht) under the title Political Theories of the Middle Ages in 1900.

== Social law ==
Rudolf von Jhering and Gierke have been recognized as forerunners of social law, which overcame the classical division of public law and private law. Social jurists argued that the norm of property, contract and tort should not govern all aspects of commercial and private interactions. By arguing that legal principles such as freedom of contract or liability for injury point to certain purposes which a legal system imposes on the social world, Gierke laid the theoretical foundations for substantial areas of social life to be regulated by social laws, such as corporate law, competition law, labour law and housing law.

== Commercial law ==
Gierke is well-known for his academic work on commercial law. Especially, he conducted research in the German Law of Association ("Das deutsche Genossenschaftsrecht").

== Children ==
His son Edgar von Gierke was a highly respected pathologist who discovered glycogen storage disease type I in 1929.

Gierke's oldest daughter Anna was among the first group of women elected to parliament in Germany in 1919.

== Publications ==
- Das deutsche Genossenschaftsrecht (Berlin 1868–1913) 4 volumes
  - vol 1. Rechtsgeschichte der deutschen Genossenschaft (1868) introduction translated by John D Lewis, The Genossenschaft – Theory of Otto von Gierke; A Study in Political Thought (1936) and selections translated by Mary Fischer and Anthony Black as Community in Historical Perspective (1990)
  - vol 2. Geschichte des deutschen Körperschaftsbegriffs (1873)
  - vol 3. Die Staats- und Korporationslehre des Alterthums und des Mittelalters und ihre Aufnahme in Deutschland (1881). Sections 3–5 was translated as Associations and law: The classical and early Christian stages by George Heiman (1977); §11, pages 500–640, 'Die publicistischen Lehren des Mittelalters' was translated by FW Maitland as Political Theories of the Middle Ages (1900).
  - vol 4. Die Staats- und Korporationslehre der Neuzeit (1913) Section V, §§14-8 translated by Ernest Barker as Natural law and the theory of society, 1500 to 1800 (1934).
- Die soziale Aufgabe des Privatrechts (Berlin 1889) translated by Ewan McGaughey as 'The Social Role of Private Law' (2018) 19(4) German Law Journal 1017
- Johannes Althusius und die Entwicklung der naturrechtlichen Staatstheorie (Berlin 1880), translation as The Development of Political Theory. Translated by Bernard Freyd. New York: Howard Fertig. 1939 – via Internet Archive.
- Naturrecht und Deutsches Recht: Rede zum Antritt des Rektorats der Universität Breslau am 15. Oktober 1882 gehalten (Frankfurt 1883)
- Rudolf von Gneist: Gedächtnissrede gehalten in der Juristischen Gesellschaft zu Berlin am 19. October 1895.
- Deutsches Privatrecht (Leipzig 1895) 3 volumes
  - 1. Allgemeiner Teil und Personenrecht (1895) on the General Part and the Law of Persons
  - 2. Sachenrecht (1905) on Property Law
  - 3. Schuldrecht (1916) on the Law of Obligations
- Schuld und Haftung im älteren deutschen Recht, insbesondere die Form der Schuld- und Haftungsgeschäfte (1910)

== See also ==
- General State Laws for the Prussian States
- Sachsenspiegel
