= Isis (journal, 1816) =

German encyclopedic journal

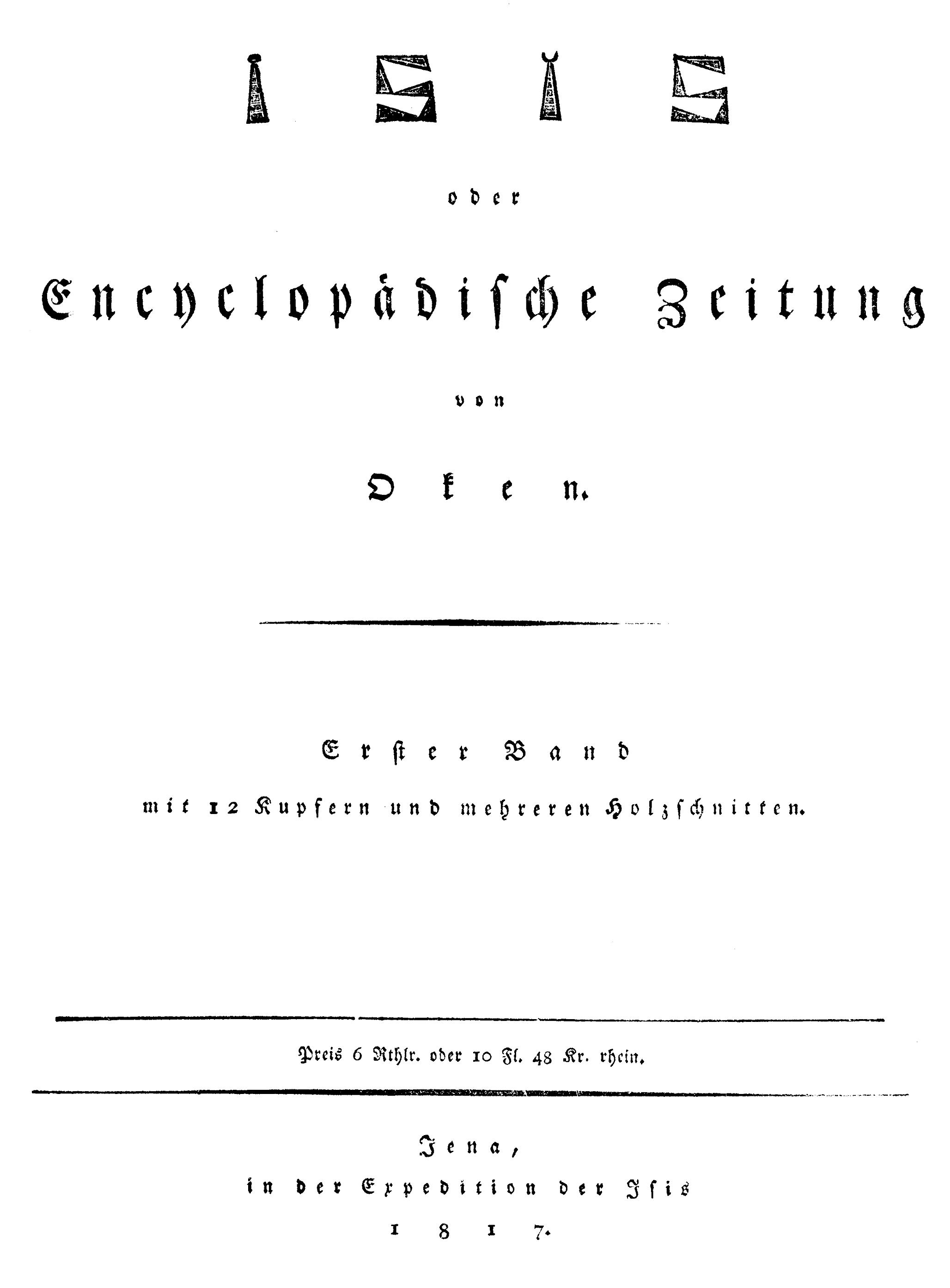
Title page of the first volume from 1817.

Isis was an encyclopedic journal that focused on articles on natural science, medicine, technology, economics as well as art and history. It also published important articles on science policy and the organization of science. Edited by Lorenz Oken and published by Friedrich Arnold Brockhaus, Isis was the first interdisciplinary journal in the German-speaking world.

The 41 volumes of the journal named after the Egyptian goddess Isis were nominally published from 1817 to 1848. However, the first issue appeared on August 1, 1816, while the printing of the last issue was delayed until February 1850. Until 1832, Isis bore the title Encyclopädische Zeitung. After the focus of the articles published in it had changed, Oken changed the title to Encyclopädische Zeitschrift, vorzüglich für Naturgeschichte, vergleichende Anatomie und Physiologie in 1833. Initially printed in Jena, the journal was banned in the Grand Duchy of Saxe-Weimar-Eisenach and from the summer of 1819 was produced in nearby Rudolstadt in the court printing works of the Principality of Schwarzburg-Rudolstadt. The magazine's original print run of 1,500 copies fell rapidly in the first few years of its existence and amounted to around 200 copies in the last few years.

Originally conceived as a non-political journal, Oken was forced to vehemently defend the freedom of the press in the first years of Isis' existence. This resulted in numerous lawsuits against Oken, some of which overlapped in time, which led to temporary bans on Isis in the Grand Duchy of Saxe-Weimar-Eisenach. In the run-up to the Carlsbad Decrees, this led to Oken's dismissal as a professor at the University of Jena at the end of June 1819 under pressure from the states of the Holy Alliance.

From 2006 to 2013, a project funded by the German Research Foundation at the Friedrich Schiller University Jena studied the significance of Isis for scientific communication and the popularization of the natural sciences in the first half of the 19th century.

== Origin ==
In a letter dated April 11, 1814, Lorenz Oken contacted the publisher Friedrich Arnold Brockhaus for the first time and offered him his publication Neue Bewaffnung, neues Frankreich, neues Theutschland for printing. Brockhaus did not print it, but Oken subsequently contributed to Brockhaus' Conversations-Lexikon and, from June 1815 at the latest, was a contributor to the Deutsche Blätter, which Brockhaus had been publishing since October 1813 following the Battle of Leipzig and which became the most important journal in central Germany in 1813/1814. Presumably at the end of June/beginning of July 1815, Oken took over the editorship of the Tagesgeschichte, a supplement to the Deutsche Blätter, which was dedicated to daily politics and for which he wrote and edited numbers 1 to 16. With the end of the Wars of Liberation, the focus of the Deutsche Blätter shifted from war reporting to general daily politics, which was associated with a considerable decline in circulation from an initial 4000 to 1100 copies. On February 22, 1816, Brockhaus announced that he would discontinue the Deutsche Blätter. Oken regretted this decision and repeatedly urged Brockhaus to continue the Deutsche Blätter in another form. He presented Brockhaus with his encyclopedic concept of a new journal, which would not focus on current politics, but on the natural sciences, critique, history and political science. Brockhaus was only to bear the printing and postage costs. The first publishing contract for the Encyclopädische Blätter was signed with Brockhaus on March 31, 1816. Oken presented his concept to readers in the last issue of Deutsche Blätter.

== Conception ==
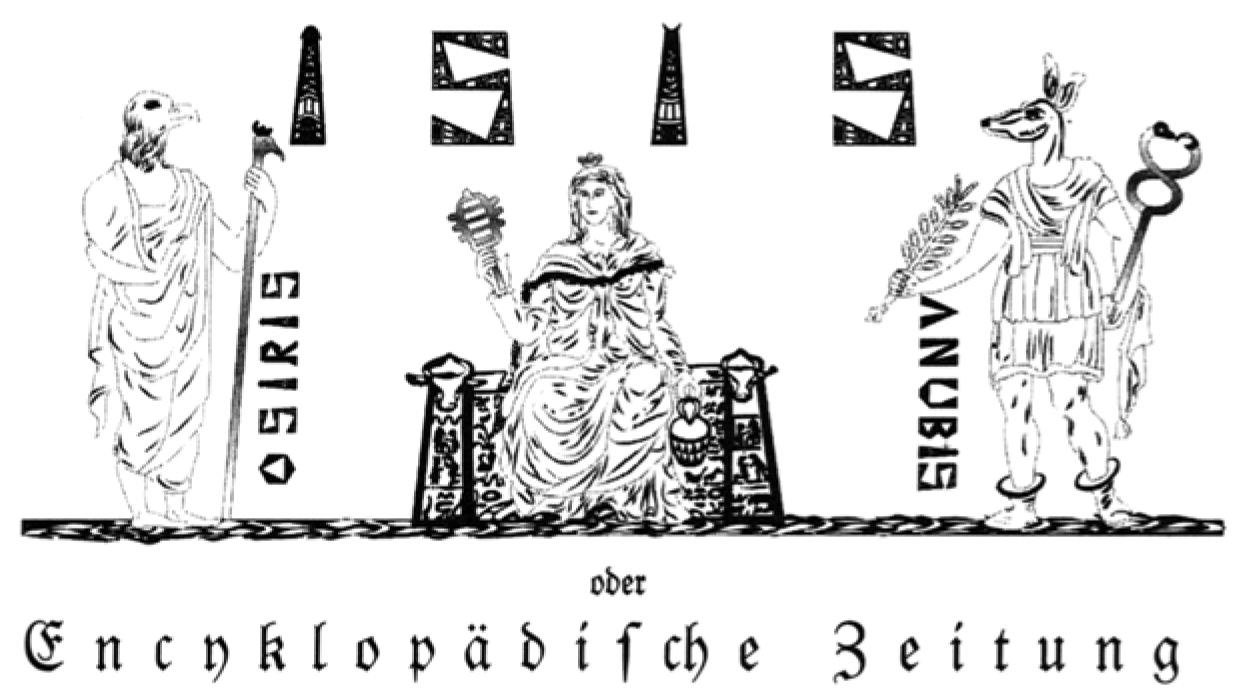
Isis cover head

The design concept for Isis was delayed until July 1816, as Oken was still working on the zoological section of his textbook on natural history. Oken reached an agreement with Brockhaus that a copper plate should appear in each booklet, and he worked towards a low sales price. They were at odds over the arrangement of the information in the title head and the text and image design. Oken had a woodcut made for the title head, in the middle of which the goddess Isis is depicted on an ancient Egyptian throne. On the left, she is flanked by her husband Osiris, who carries a vulture's head and a staff. To her right is Anubis with a jackal's head, palm branch and snake sceptre. Oken commissioned the rector of the Academy of Fine Arts Leipzig, Veit Schnorr von Carolsfeld (1764–1841), to create the frontispiece and later copper plates. There were differences of opinion as to whether foreign-language contributions should be translated into German. Oken spoke out against it due to the difficulty of translating certain technical terms. Brockhaus was in favour of a translation for reasons of popularization.

The title Isis first appeared in correspondence between Oken and Brockhaus at the end of July, shortly before the first issue went to press. The two agreed on Encyclopädische Zeitung as the additional title, in line with the originally intended title of the journal. Oken sent the draft of the first edition, produced by the printer Johann Georg Schreiber in Jena, to Brockhaus' publishing house in Altenburg on July 13, 1816, with the remark that it was to be published in a new edition. Oken introduced this first issue of Isis, which appeared on August 1, 1816, with an excerpt from the Basic Law on the State Constitution of the Grand Duchy of Saxe-Weimar-Eisenach. In it, he presented the programmatic orientation of his new journal. Isis was to cover natural sciences, medicine, mathematics, technology, economics, art and history. Law and theology were expressly excluded. Oken wrote "That is why history is the mirror of this journal, nature its floor, art its pillar wall. We leave the sky open." (Note: In: Isis. Vol. 1, Issue I, Number 1, 1816, Sp. 5–6 (online)) Anyone could send articles to Isis for publication. Oken did not pay a fee for published articles.

== Oken's fight for freedom of expression and the press ==
=== Legal dispute with Eichstädt ===
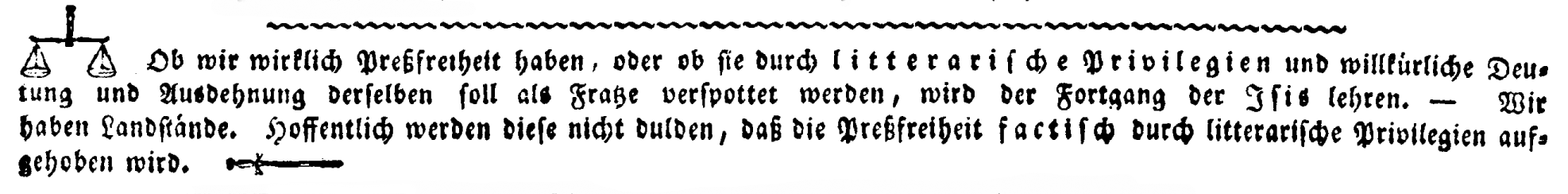
"Whether we really have freedom of the press, or whether it is to be mocked as a grimace by literary privileges and the arbitrary interpretation and extension of the same, will be taught by the progress of Isis. - We have estates. Hopefully they will not tolerate the de facto abolition of freedom of the press through literary privileges."

Even before Isis was published, the classical philologist Abraham Eichstädt from Jena learned of the planned new journal. Eichstädt, who published the Jenaische allgemeine Literatur-Zeitung, had held an exclusive right to publish reviews in Saxe-Weimar-Eisenach since 1803. As he feared for the financial security of his paper, Eichstädt turned to the President of the State Ministry in Weimar, Christian Gottlob Voigt, and obtained a renewal of this privilege on July 17, 1816. Oken saw this as a violation of the freedom of the press guaranteed in the Weimar Constitution of May 15, 1816 and sneered in the second issue of Isis: "Whether we really have freedom of the press, or whether it is to be mocked as a grimace through literary privileges and arbitrary interpretation and extension of the same, will be taught by the progress of Isis." (Note: In: Isis. Vol.1, Issue I, Number 2, 1816 (online).) Eichstädt filed a lawsuit against Oken and Isis on August 1, 1816. In a judgment dated August 23, Oken was ordered to refrain from publishing reviews and political articles. In the event of non-compliance, he was threatened with a fine of 50 thalers and a ban on Isis. Oken, who became aware of the verdict eight days later, protested against it to the Weimar government on September 2 and attached the first five issues of Isis to his letter in support of his position. In the course of September 1816, the verdict against Oken and Isis was finally withdrawn. Looking ahead, Johann Wolfgang von Goethe commented on the events in his diary on July 30, 1816, with the remark: "Isis as Hydra."

=== Goethe's recommendation for a ban ===
In order not to exacerbate the disputes with Eichstädt, Oken had filled the first four issues exclusively with scientific topics and suggested to Brockhaus that he initially refrain from including controversial political articles, as political newspapers in the Duchy of Saxe-Weimar-Eisenach were still subject to censorship. However, Brockhaus did not agree to this and delayed the delivery of the first four issues. As the dispute with Eichstädt progressed, Oken finally felt compelled to include political topics in Isis. In the sixth issue of Isis, he placed a prize issue in which he questioned the legitimacy of literary privileges. (Note: Preisaufgabe an alle Juristenfacultäten der ganzen Welt. In: Isis. Vol.1, Issue I, Number 6, 1816, Sp. 43–44 (online).) In the ninth issue and the two following issues, Oken criticized the Basic Law on the Landständische Verfassung des Großherzogthums Sachsen-Weimar-Eisenach, which came into force on 5 May 1816. (Note: Über das Grundgesetz über die Landständische Verfassung des Großherzogtums Sachsen – Weimar – Eisenach. In: Isis. Vol. 1, Issue I, Number 9–11, 1816, Sp. 65–84 (online).) In the third issue of Isis, Oken also printed a letter dated December 5, 1811, from the Rostock professors Samuel Gottlieb Vogel, Wilhelm Josephi, Georg Heinrich Masius (1771–1823) and Karl Ernst Theodor Brandenburg (1772–1827), in which they rejected Oken's appointment to the vacant chair of natural history at the University of Rostock due to his pompous natural philosophy. Oken illustrated the print with a vignette depicting donkey heads. (Note: In: Isis. Vol. 1, Issue I, Number 3, 1816, Sp. 22 (online))

On September 10, 1816, Christian Gottlob von Voigt drew up an indictment in response to these Isis editions. Oken was accused of insulting the highest royal dignity of the sovereign, insulting official dignity, attacking some German governments and their rulers, as well as insulting foreign official authorities and the Rostock professors. A week later, Grand Duke Karl August sent the indictment to the State Directorate for examination. The expert opinions written by Anton Ziegesar (1783–1843), the head of the administrative and police authority Karl Wilhelm von Fritsch, and the head of the school and church system Ernst Christian August von Gersdorff were collected together with the first eleven issues of Isis in a file entitled Acta Geheimer Staats-Canzley Den Unfug der Preßfrechheit besonders der Isis betr. 1816.

Grand Duke Carl August sent this file to Goethe at the end of September and asked him for his judgment. As can be seen from his diary notes, Goethe needed several days to consider the matter of Isis. In his reply of 5 October, Goethe recommended to the Grand Duke not to prosecute Oken personally, but to take action against the printer of Isis and thus enforce a ban on printing the journal. Carl August did not follow Goethe's advice, but instead discontinued the prosecution.

=== The Wartburgfest and the confiscated number 195 of Isis ===
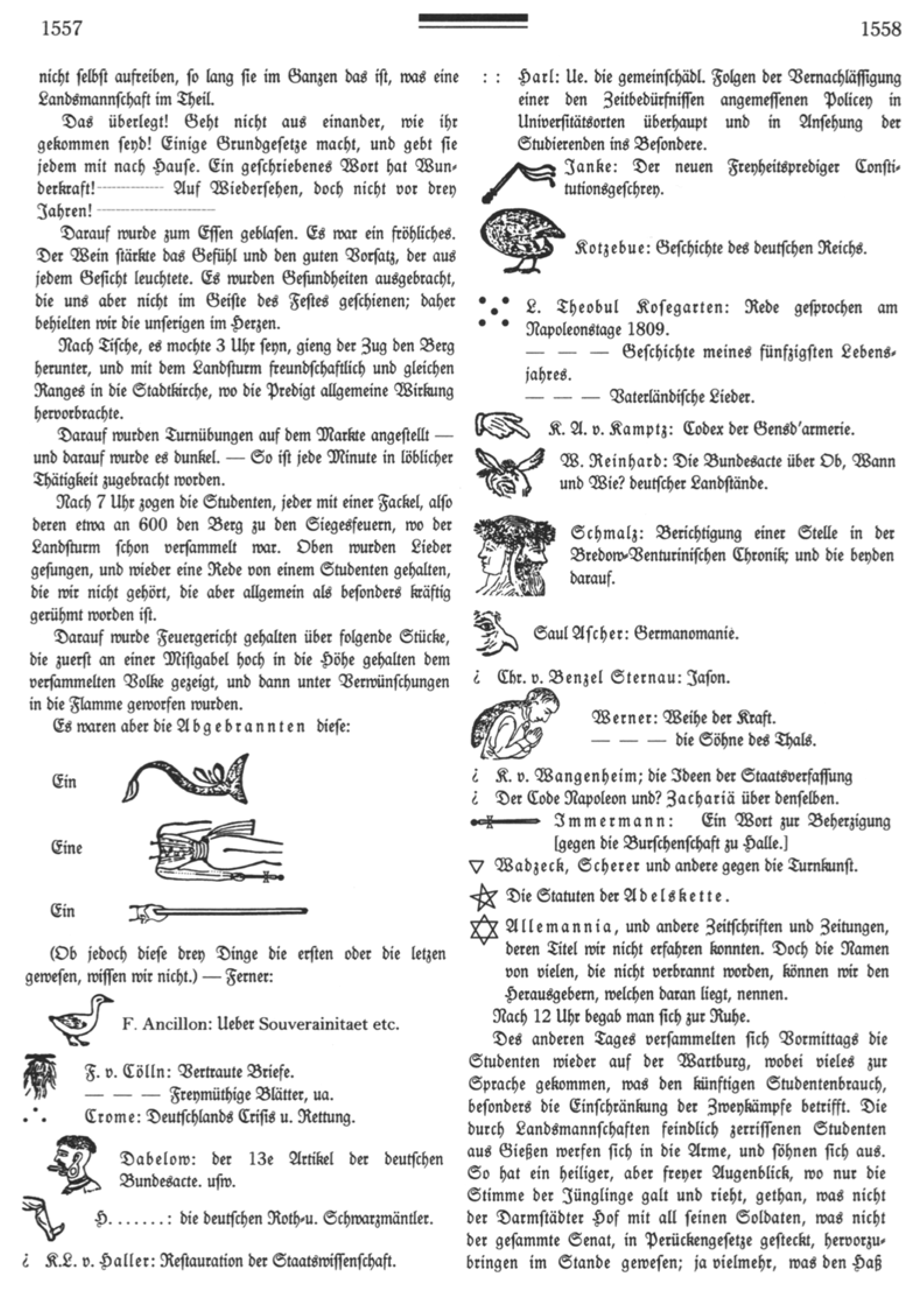
The list of books burned at the Wartburg Festival from the confiscated number 195 of Isis from 1817

Before the end of 1816, Isis was banned in Austria. Meanwhile, Oken continued to campaign for freedom of the press and, for example, published a report on the meeting of the Dutch estates under the title "Against the Restriction of Freedom of the Press". (Note: Gegen die Beschränkung der Pressfreiheit. In: Isis. Issue III, Number 38, 1817, Sp. 297–304 (online).) In June 1817, the Prussian Minister of Police, Wilhelm Ludwig Georg Fürst zu Wittgenstein, complained to Carl August about a derogatory criticism of a Prussian decree of 1811 that had appeared in the Oppositions-Blatt and a small note in Isis, (Note: Isis. Issue VIII, Number 138, 1817, Sp. 1097 (online)) in which Oken complained about Prussia's presumption in wanting to interfere even in insignificant matters such as those of the Vienna Agricultural Society. Six days later, a serious warning was issued to the editor of the opposition journal Friedrich Justin Bertuch and Oken, stating "that in the event of further disregard of the sovereign's or authorities' orders, the suppression of this journal will be pursued".

During the Wartburg Festival, which Oken and other professors from Jena attended, an auto-da-fé took place on the evening of October 18, 1817, during which parts of a Prussian Uhlan uniform, a Hessian soldier's braid and an Austrian corporal's baton, as well as several books by authors considered reactionary, including Karl Albert von Kamptz, Theodor Schmalz, Karl Ludwig von Haller and August von Kotzebue, were burned. Fourteen days later, Oken published a report on the meeting at Wartburg Castle, which also contained a list of the burned books and objects, along with mocking signs. (Note: Der Studentenfrieden auf der Wartburg. In: Isis. Issue XI/XII, Number 195, 1817, Sp. 1553–1559 (online).)

Kamptz, the head of the Ministry of Police in Berlin, whose Codex der Gensd'armerie was one of the burned books, railed in a letter dated November 9, 1817 to Grand Duke Carl August about the "bunch of feral professors and seduced students" and went on to write: "If true freedom of thought and freedom of the press really flourishes in Your Royal Highness's states, then censorship practiced by fire and pitchforks, by enthusiasts and minors, and terrorist proceedings against freedom of thought and freedom of the press in other states are certainly not compatible with this." The following day, a report by Weimar State Minister Karl Wilhelm von Fritsch exonerated Oken and the other professors, stating that they had not taken part in the burning. Nevertheless, on November 27, 1817, number 195 was confiscated and a temporary ban on the printing of Isis was issued, which was lifted on December 15. From December 2 onwards, a commission consisting of members of the Weimar state government investigated the Isis incidents. Oken was interrogated several times in Weimar. The commission submitted its report to the state government on December 20. The government was willing to return the confiscated copies of Isis if the disputed passages were removed. Oken did not agree to this deal. On January 24, 1818, Oken was sentenced to six weeks in prison for "offenses against the highest dignity of the sovereign, offenses against the official dignity of the upper state authorities and the academic senate in Jena, denigration of German rulers and governments and insulting foreign official authorities". Together with his statement published by the Bremer Zeitung at the end of March 1818, (Note: Ueber Okens Urtheil von Oken : (Aus der Bremer Zeitung, 26. März 18.). In: Isis. Issue IV, 1818, Sp. 748–761, (online).) Oken had the sentence printed in full in Isis. (Note: Urtheil. In: Isis. Issue IV, 1818, Sp. 739–748 (online).) Oken appealed against the sentence to the Jena High Court of Appeal and was acquitted on April 29, 1818.

=== The August von Kotzebue incident ===
Through an indiscretion, the history professor Heinrich Luden from Jena came into possession of one of the numerous bulletins written by the Russian consul general Kotzebue and intended for Tsar Alexander I in mid-December 1817. He wrote a biting commentary on it for the journal Nemesis, although Kotzebue was able to prevent its publication and dissemination by court order on January 15, 1818. Oken nevertheless published Luden's article in the first issue of Isis in 1818. (Note: [Heinrich Luden]: Die (angeblichen) Bulletins des Herrn von Kotzebue: ein Beitrag zu Kenntnis der Zeit. In: Isis. Issue I, 1818, Sp. 202–215 (online).) After the issue was published, the remaining copies were confiscated. Isis was banned again on January 31, 1818, and was not published again until the end of April. (Note: Die Ursache. In: Isis. Issue II, 1818, Sp. 404 (online).) Both Luden and Oken were sentenced to three months imprisonment and a fine of 60 thalers by the Königlich Sächsischen Schöppengericht in Leipzig. Oken chose the fine and again published the files relating to the trial in Isis. (Note: Entscheidungsgründe. In: Isis. Issue IV, 1818, Sp. 762–765 (online).) On March 23, 1819, Kotzebue was murdered in Mannheim by the Jena fraternity member and theology student Karl Ludwig Sand.

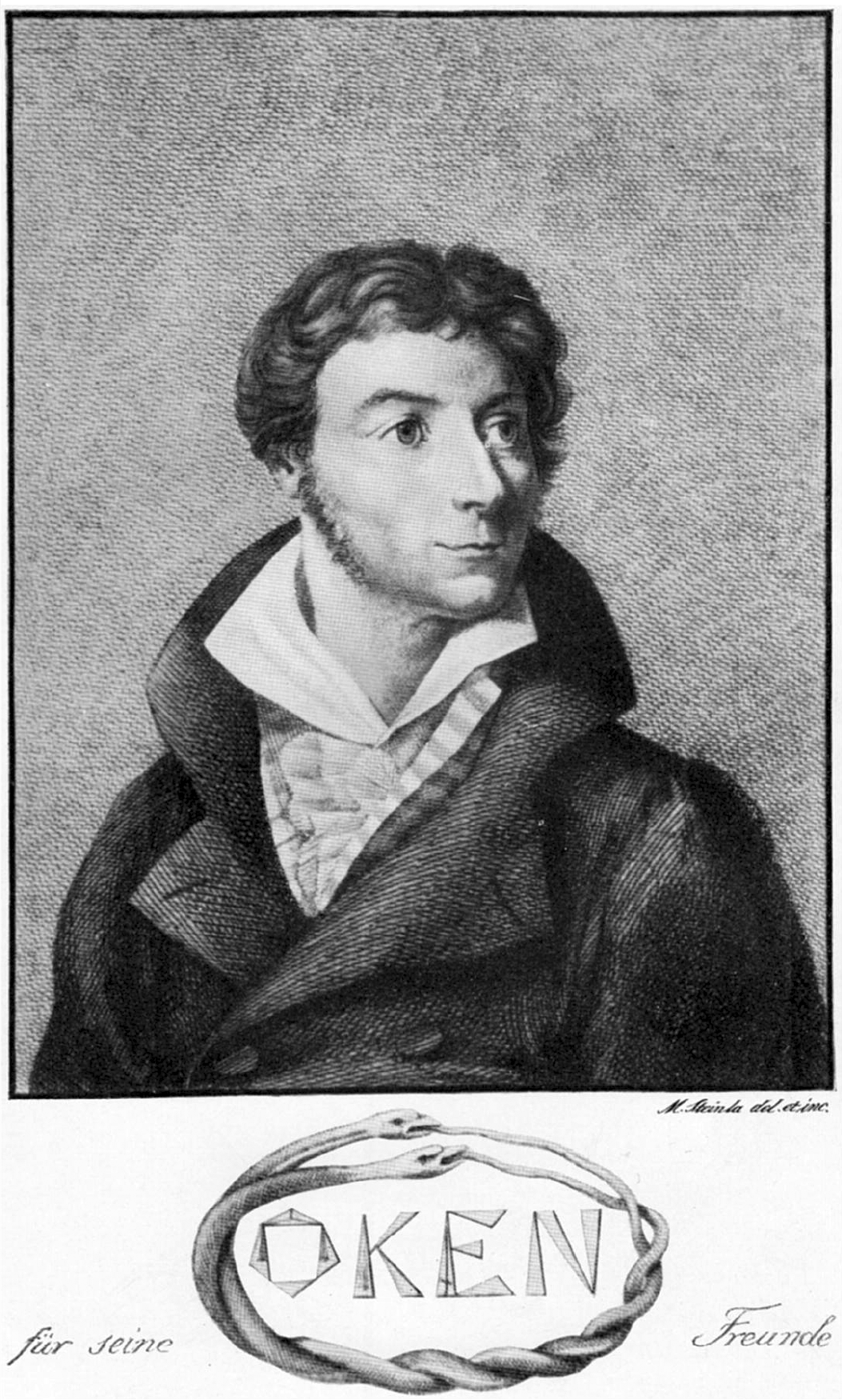
Oken für seine Freunde. Engraving by Moritz Steinla (1819)

=== Oken's dismissal ===
The attacks against Oken's Isis from the states of the Holy Alliance continued relentlessly. On January 29, 1819, Karl August von Hardenberg submitted a complaint to Grand Duke Karl August because of a derisive remark about the Prussian King Friedrich Wilhelm III, which was printed in the twelfth issue of 1818, but this time without consequences for Oken and Isis.

At the Aachen Congress in the fall of 1818, the Russian Tsar Alexander I distributed an anonymously written memorandum by Alexander Scarlatovich Sturdsa (1791–1854) entitled Memoire sur l'état actuel de l'Allemagne, in which Sturdsa commented on the dangerous activities at German universities. (Note: Stourdza. In: Isis. Issue XI, 1818, Sp. 1941–1944 (online).) (Note: Auch eine Denkschrift über den gegenwärtigen Zustand von Deutschland, oder Würdigung der Denkschrift des Herrn von Stourdza in juridischer, moralischer, politischer und religioser Hinsicht / Vom Professor Krug in Leipzig. - Leipzig : Brockhaus, 1819. In: Isis. Issue II, 1819, Sp. 361–362 (online).) Oken's replies again caused a sensation. Under pressure from the Russian envoy to the Saxon court, Vasily Vasilyevich Chanykov (1759–1829), the Weimar state treasurer Carl August Constantin Schnauss (1782–1832) was forced to file charges against Oken on April 20, 1819. On May 11, Grand Duke Carl August of Weimar and Duke August of Gotha instructed the Senate of the University of Jena to give Oken the choice of either discontinuing Isis or resigning his professorship. The Senate tried to give in, but had to present Oken with this choice eleven days later. After three days of deliberation, Oken responded evasively: "I have no answer to the request made to me. Perhaps they have come to a different conclusion that an answer is unnecessary." In its reply to the dukes, the Senate once again referred to Oken's outstanding reputation as a teacher and researcher, but to no avail. On June 1, 1819, Duke Carl Friedrich ordered Oken's dismissal and the withholding of his salary from June 15 onwards in the name and on behalf of his father. A similar order from the Duchy of Saxe-Gotha-Altenburg followed six days later. On June 26, 1818, the printing of Isis was provisionally banned. (Note: Okens Dienstentlassung. In: Isis. Issue V, 1819, unnumbered after Sp. 800 (online).)

To avoid the ban, Oken moved the printing of Isis to nearby Rudolstadt in the Principality of Schwarzburg-Rudolstadt. There, Carl Popo Fröbel (1786–1824), stepbrother of the educator Friedrich Fröbel and owner of the court printing works since 1815, took over the printing of Isis from August 1819. After Fröbel's death in 1824, the print shop was initially taken over by Fröbel's widow and finally continued by his son Günther Fröbel from 1832, who produced the last issues of Isis in 1850. A small part of Isis was produced in Eisenberg until 1824/25.

After the Carlsbad Decrees of September 1819, it became increasingly difficult to deal with political issues. Their share of articles in Isis fell sharply. After Brockhaus' death, Oken announced in the first issue of 1824 that Isis would no longer print political articles.

== Content ==
In addition to Oken, many natural scientists and humanities scholars, writers and artists contributed to the content of Isis. Among the authors who published articles in the first volume of Isis were Alexander von Humboldt, Christoph Wilhelm Hufeland, Madame de Staël, August Wilhelm Schlegel, Georges Cuvier and Johannes Peter Müller. There were reviews of Goethe's Aus meinem Leben. Dichtung und Wahrheit, Luigi Valentino Brugnatelli's (1761–1818) Kreistafel der chemischen Aequivalente, Christian Gottfried Daniel Nees von Esenbeck's System der Pilze und Schwämme, Leopoldo Cicognara's (1767–1834) Von den vier venetianischen Kunstpferden, Charles Robert Cockerell's Ueber die ursprüngliche Anwendung der Niobe und ihrer Kinder and Ludwig Wachler's Deutschlands Zukunft in der Gegenwart. Isis reported on the state of affairs at German universities, published their course catalogs and also regularly set prizes.

From the outset, Isis devoted considerable space to summaries and abstracts of publications published in foreign scientific and academic journals. Initially, the relevant journals came from the United Kingdom, France, Italy and Switzerland. These were later supplemented by journals from Scandinavia, Belgium, the Netherlands, Russia and the United States. Oken's approach to editing the articles varied greatly. Sometimes Oken's texts consisted of an abridged translation of the corresponding article, usually they summarized its main content in one paragraph. As a rule, the majority of the articles were only listed with their title - usually translated into German.

In 1821, Oken published the first call for an assembly of German naturalists in Isis, (Note: Versammlung der deutschen Naturforscher. In: Isis. Litterarischer Anzeiger. 1821, Sp. 196–198 (online).) which led to the founding of the Society of German Natural Scientists and Physicians in September 1822. Detailed reports on the society's annual meetings were published regularly until the end.

From 1833, Isis bore the new title Encyclopädische Zeitschrift, vorzüglich für Naturgeschichte, vergleichende Anatomie und Physiologie. This change reflected the changing focus of the articles over time. The already small number of articles dealing with mathematics and physics decreased further.

In the last volume of 1848, Christian Ludwig Brehm published original articles in Isis with Ueber das allmählige Fortrücken der Vögel, Carl Friedrich Wilhelm Siedhofs (1803 - ca. 1867) with Naturgeschichtliches aus den Vereinigten Staaten von Nordamerica, Johann Jakob Kaup with Uebersicht der Eulen (Strigidae) and Christian Gottfried Giebel with Das subhercynische Becken um Quedlinburg in geognostisch-paläontologischer Beziehung. Some of the publications discussed in this volume were Sebastian Egger's (1803–1866) Ueber die Pflichten gegen die Thiere, Franz von Kobell's Mineralogie, Christian Gottfried Giebel's Fauna der Vorwelt, Mauro Rusconi's (1776–1849) Riflessioni sopra il sistema linfatico dei rettili, Johann Malfatti's Neue Heilversuche, Karl Bernhard Stark's Kunst und Schule and Joseph Hippolyt Pultes (1805–1869) Organon der Weltgeschichte.

In the last edition, Oken ended Isis with the words: "This is the end of Isis." (Note: In: Isis. IssueXII, 1848, Sp. 1077–1078 (online).)

== Circulation ==
In the initial period from August 1816 to February 1817, the circulation of Isis, which cost eight thalers a year, was 1500 copies. On March 4, 1817, Brockhaus reduced the print run to 1100 copies due to a lack of sales and reduced it by a further 100 copies a week later. When the actual sales figures were known in June 1817, there was a further drastic reduction of 650 copies. In 1825/1826, only 400 copies were printed. This was followed by a slight increase to up to 500 copies for the next few years until 1830. After that, the circulation fell continuously and was around 200 copies in the last ten years of Isis' existence. This relatively low circulation was nothing unusual. For example, the circulation of the Jahrbücher für wissenschaftliche Kritik, one of the most important journals for scientific reviews, was around 500 copies in the years from 1827 to 1846 and that of the Medizinische Annalen, edited by Johann Friedrich Pierer, was 500 to 700 copies.

== Research ==
In 2001, the German historian of science Dietrich von Engelhardt characterized Isis as "a first-rate scientific and cultural-historical document from that transitional epoch from idealism and romanticism to positivism and realism", the analysis of which was still pending. Since 2006, the Institute for the History of Medicine, Natural Science and Technology at the Friedrich Schiller University of Jena, headed by Olaf Breidbach, has been investigating the significance of Isis for scientific communication and the popularization of the natural sciences in the first half of the 19th century, as well as its economic structure, in a project funded by the German Research Foundation. In a three-year project that began in July 2006, Claudia Taszus initially focused on the company documents found in the Fröbel court printing works. This was followed in 2009 by a project aimed at cataloguing the correspondence between Oken and the Brockhaus publishing house. The activities funded by the German Research Foundation also include the project carried out by the Thuringian University and State Library and the Ereignis Weimar-Jena. Kultur um 1800 at the University of Jena, the digitization, indexing and online presentation of Isis.

== Bibliography ==
- Brockhaus, Heinrich Eduard, ed. (1876). Oken's "Isis". Friedrich Arnold Brockhaus. Sein Leben und Wirken nach Briefen und anderen Aufzeichnungen. Leipzig: Brockhaus. pp. 165–201.
- Degen, Heinz (1955). "Lorenz Oken und seine Isis um die Gründungszeit der Gesellschaft Deutscher Naturforscher und Ärzte". Naturwissenschaftliche Rundschau. 8: 45–150, 180–189.
- von Engelhardt, Dietrich (2003). "Lorenz Oken und das Wartburgfest 1817 mit einem Abdruck des konfiszierten Heftes 195 der Isis". NTM Zeitschrift für Geschichte der Wissenschaften, Technik und Medizin. 11 (1): 1–12. doi:10.1007/BF02908582.
- Kertesz, G. A. (1986). "Notes on Isis von Oken, 1817–1848". Isis. 77 (3): 497–503. doi:10.1086/354208. JSTOR 231611.
- Schweizer, Claudia, ed. (2004). Lorenz Okens "Isis". Johann Wolfgang von Goethe und Kaspar Maria von Sternberg. Naturforscher und Gleichgesinnte. LIT Verlag Münster. pp. 179–198. ISBN 3-8258-7579-2.
- Taszus, Claudia (2009). Breidbach, Olaf; Poggi, Stefano (eds.). Okens Isis. Pressefreiheit, Restriktionen und Zensur in Mitteldeutschland in der ersten Hälfte des 19. Jahrhunderts. Jahrbuch für Europäische Wissenschaftskultur. Vol. 4. Stuttgart: Steiner. pp. 205–241.
- Taszus, Claudia (2009). Lorenz Okens Isis (1816–1848). Zur konzeptionellen, organisatorischen und technischen Realisierung der Zeitschrift. Blätter der Gesellschaft für Buchkultur und Geschichte. Rudolstadt: Jahrgang. pp. 85–154.
