= Heinrich Luden =

German historian (1778–1847)

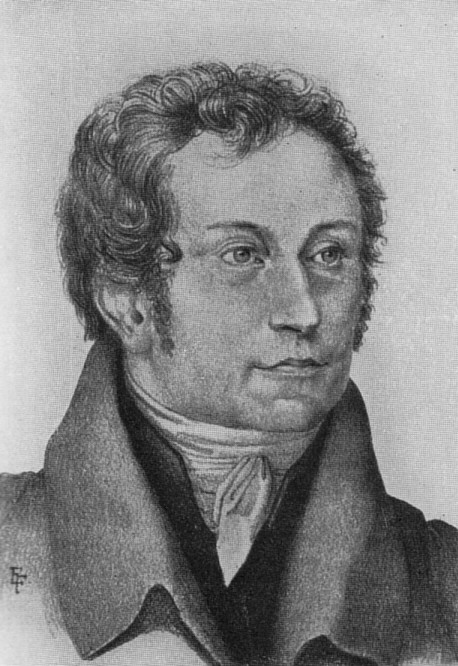
Heinrich Luden

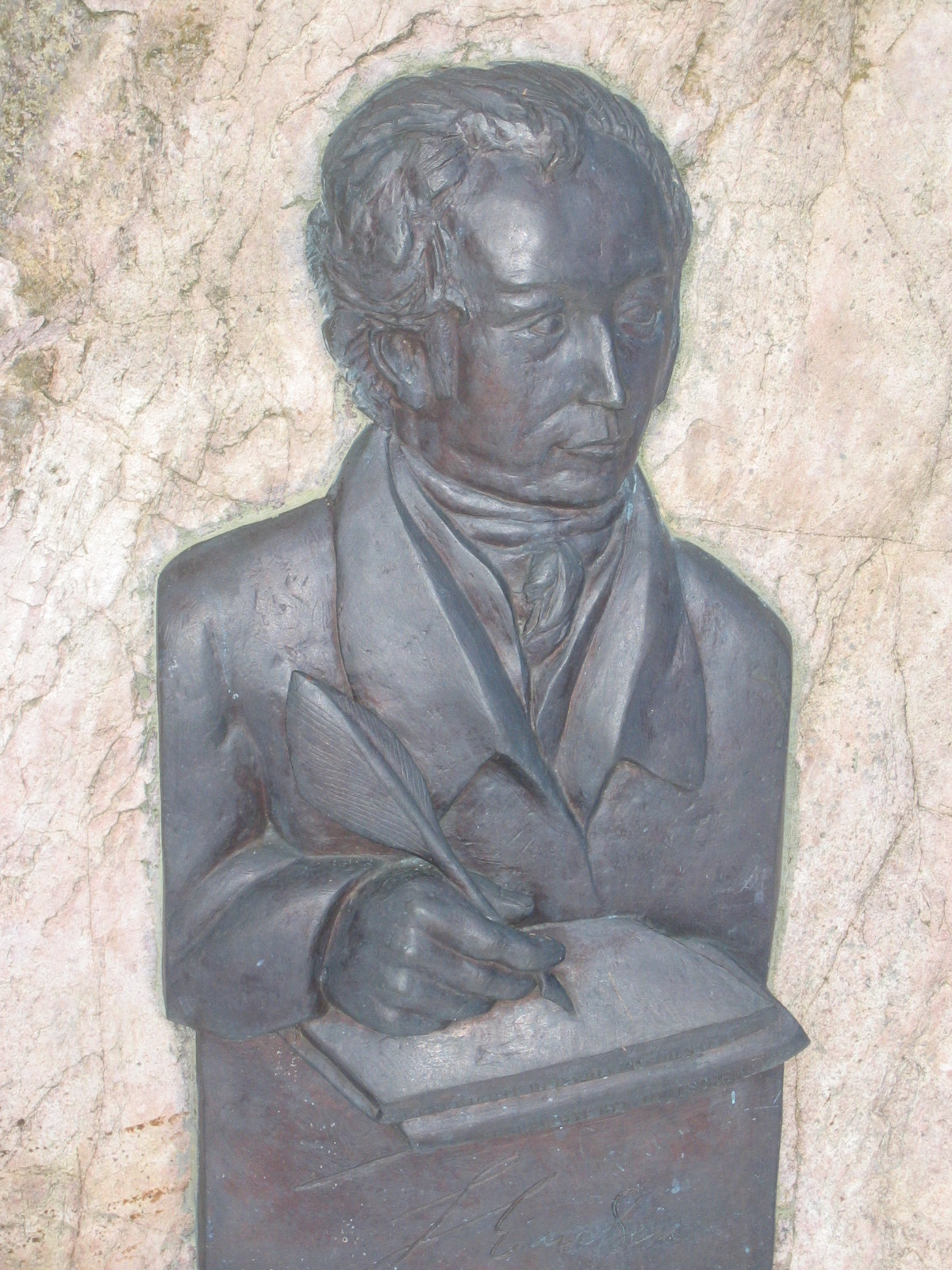
Heinrich Luden

Heinrich Luden (10 April 1778 – 23 May 1847) was a German historian.

== Life ==
Luden was born in Loxstedt in the district of Stade. At the age of 17 Luden went to the Domschule (Cathedral School) in Bremen. He subsequently studied theology at the University of Göttingen, where he came under the influence of the historians August Ludwig von Schlözer and later Johannes von Müller and devoted himself to the study of history. He was briefly employed as a private tutor in the house of Christoph Wilhelm Hufeland in Berlin, in 1805 producing his thesis in Jena on Christian Thomasius. He further published biographies of Hugo Grotius (1806) and Sir William Temple (1808).

In 1806 Luden succeeded Friedrich Schiller as Extraordinary Professor of History at the University of Jena, in 1810 attaining the post of Ordinary Professor. He dedicated himself to German history, with the intention of developing a German national consciousness. He continued this theme in subsequent numerous publication on the theme of unity and freedom.

In his lectures, much attended by the Burschenschaften (student associations) he championed the ideal of the sovereignty of the people, showing the influence of Jean-Jacques Rousseau. In 1817, with certain other professors, including the medic Dietrich Georg von Kieser and the philosophers Lorenz Oken and Jakob Friedrich Fries he participated in the Wartburg Festival. In 1820 Luden entered the Landstände of the Grand Duchy of Saxony-Weimar-Eisenach as a deputy and remained one of its most active members until 1832. Following the Karlsbad Decrees Luden was forbidden from lecturing on political subjects.

Among his students were the assassin Karl Ludwig Sand and the Königsberg historian Johannes Voigt.

Luden died in Jena.

== Works ==
- Geschichte des Teutschen Volkes (12 vols., 1825–45)
- Geschichte der Teutschen (3 vols.)

== Bibliography ==
- Johannes Haage, Heinrich Luden, 1930
- Ralph Mark, Die Entwicklung nationaler Geschichtsschreibung, Frankfurt am Main 1987
- Sabine Mattasch, Der Tatbestand des Verbrechens bei Heinrich Luden, 2003
- Gerhard Müller, Heinrich Luden als Parlamentarier, Weimar 1998
- Elisabeth Reissig, Heinrich Luden als Publizist und Politiker, Jena, 1916
