= Mauro Ruscóni =

Italian physician and zoologist

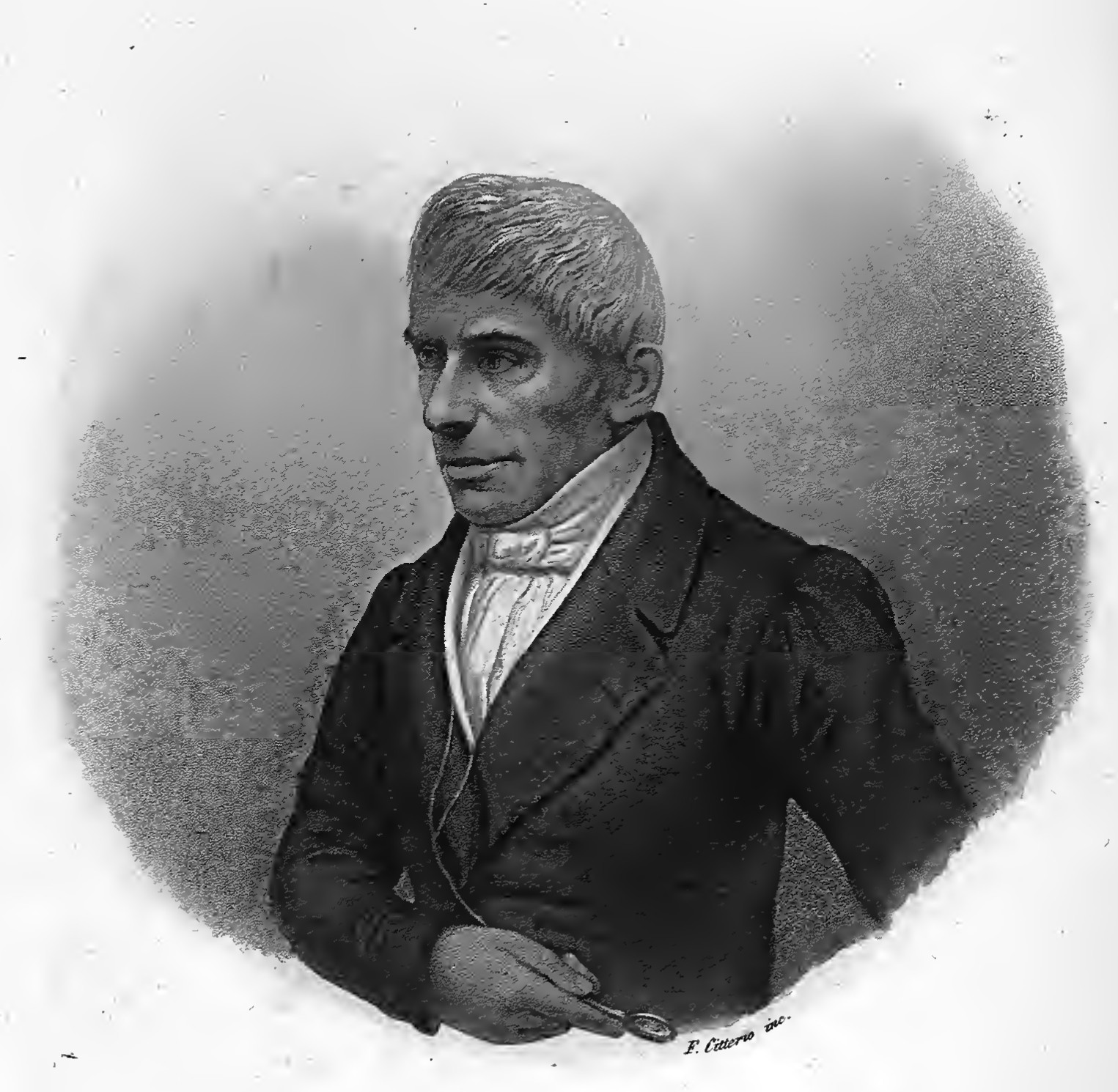
- Born: 18 November 1776; Pavia, Lombardy, Italy
- Died: 27 March 1849 (aged 72); Tremezzina, Lombardy, Austrian Empire
- Awards: Institut de France gold medal (1831)
- Scientific career
- Fields: Amphibians anatomy and embryology

Mauro Ruscóni (18 November 1776 in Pavia - 27 March 1849 in Tremezzina (Note: According to Treccani, he retired to Cadenabbia 2 km away from Tremezzina)) is an Italian medical doctor and zoologist.

== Biography ==
Coming from a respected merchant family, he finished his studies in his native town and in the 1790s, swept away by the political events of his time: he joined the army of the Cisalpine Republic fighting alongside the French in the war of the Second Coalition. He became an artillery captain and when the fortress of Mantua surrendered to the Austrians in 1799, he was in the garrison of the fortress. (Note: Not to be confused with the siege of Mantua (1796–97))

After a stay in Paris, he resumed his medical studies in Pavia where he obtained his doctorate in 1806 and in 1807 he was repeater in medicine at the University of Pavia, post where he was active until 1817. From 1818 onwards, he devoted himself solely to zoology.

After the events of 1848, suffering and ill, he left Pavia and went to Lake Como, where he died some time later.

His work deals with the anatomy and metamorphosis of fish, frogs, salamanders and other reptiles. He was the author of research in animal embryology and comparative anatomy on the reproduction of newts and on the development of the frog: he was the first to observe and report exactly the segmentation of the egg as well as the formation of the morula and the blastopore. Unfortunately the fact that he did not have a real academic position prevented him from having a real scientific career and getting the reputation he deserved. Moreover, despite his skill in dissecting and preparing samples, he did not leave any collections.

On 23 June 1831, the Institut de France awarded him the gold medal for one of his works. Around 1838, the Lombard Academy had accepted him as one of its members and the Imperial Academy of Sciences in Vienna had included him among its members since its creation (1 February 1848). He was also a member of the academies of Modena, Bologna, Turin, Paris and the Vienna Medical Society. He was in constant scientific contact with the most important naturalists of his country of origin, but also with those of his time, such as Georges Cuvier or Lorenz Oken.

== Works ==
- Descrizione anatomica degli organi della circolazione delle larve delle salamandre acquatiche (1817)
- Amours des salamandres aquatiques et développement du têtard de ces salamandres depuis l’œuf jusqu’à l'animal parfait (1821)
- Observations on the natural history and structure of the Proteus anguinus (1821)
- Développement de la grenouille commune depuis le moment de sa naissance jusqu'à son état parfait (1826)
- Observations anatomiques sur la sirène : mise en parallèle avec le protée et le têtard de la salamandre aquatique (1837)
- Riflessioni sopra il sistema linfatico dei rettili (1845)
- Histoire naturelle, développement et métamorphose de la Salamandre terrestre (1854) (posthumous work)

== Legacy ==
A street is named after him in Pavia from via Felice Cavallotti to via Siro Comi.
