= Georg Voigt =

German historian (1827–1891)

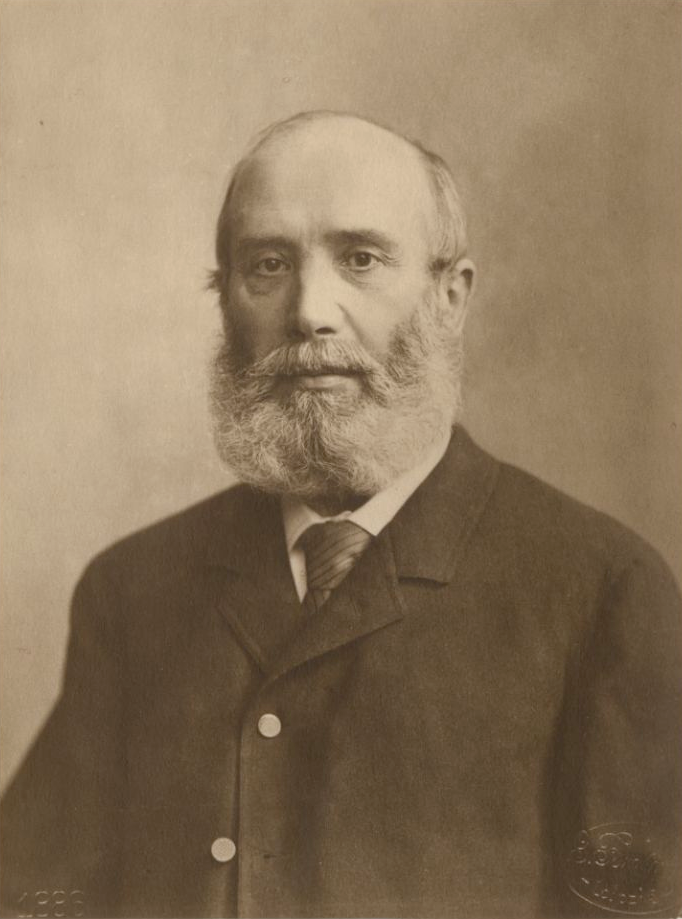
Georg Voigt

Georg Voigt was a German historian who was born in 1827 in Königsberg in East Prussia. He died in Leipzig in 1891. Voigt was the son of the historian Johannes Voigt. Voigt belonged to the founders of modern research into the Italian Renaissance along with Jacob Burckhardt.

In 1860, Voigt was called by Heinrich von Sybel to the University of Rostock as professor of history. In 1866, he became professor of history at the University of Leipzig, following the historian Wilhelm Wachsmuth. His research was into the topics of humanism in the 15th and 16th centuries and the history of the Schmalkaldic war. Unlike Burckhardt, Voigt described only the first century of a movement which came from Renaissance Florence and spread all through Europe. Burckhardt described all features of Italian society of the Renaissance. Their research methods were very different. Burckhardt was more a cultural historian with a historic-philosophical method. Voigt, in the methodical scholarship of Leopold von Ranke, worked more with a philological method. Voigt wrote Wiederbelebung des classischen Alterthums oder das erste Jahrhundert des Humanismus (Revival of Classical Antiquity or the First Century of Humanism). In Voigt's opinion Francesco Petrarca was the origin of Italian humanism. What was very important to him was the new relationship of man in the Renaissance to Classical antiquity especially to Cicero and his humanitas (humanity). Cicero's humanitas is the terminological origin of humanism in general. Despite the connection between Dante Alighieri and Roman authors such as Seneca and Cicero, he is not, in Voigt's opinion, a typical Renaissance man like Petrach and his successors, because Dante stood in the late mediaeval world and the corporative structures. In recognizing his own self as a human in context with the studies of the Classical authors, Petrarch left the old mediaeval world and its structures behind. The consciousness of being a human was the new quality. In the tradition of Ranke and Johann Gustav Droysen, Voigt used the term "humanism" for the description of a historical period.

Additionally, Voigt wrote a book on Maurice of Saxony. Voigt's biography of the Elector is the first, which comes up to the standards of objective historical science. He realised within a postulate from the German historian Wilhelm Maurenbrecher.

== Selected publications ==
- Enea Silvio de' Piccolomini als Papst Pius II und seine Zeit, 3 Bde., Berlin 1856–1863.
- Die Wiederbelebung des classischen Alterthums oder das erste Jahrhundert des Humanismus, 2 Bde., 3. Aufl., Berlin 1893 (Erstauflage in einem Band, Berlin 1859).
- Moritz von Sachsen, Leipzig 1876.
- Die Geschichtsschreibung über den Schmalkaldischen Krieg, Leipzig 1873.
