= Karl Ludwig Sand =

German university student and executed murderer (1795–1820)

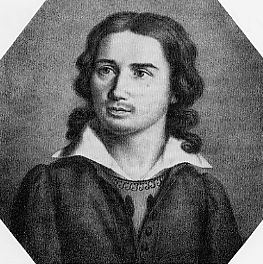
- Born: 5 October 1795; Wunsiedel, Principality of Bayreuth, Kingdom of Prussia
- Died: 20 May 1820 (aged 24); Mannheim, Grand Duchy of Baden
- Occupation: Theology student
- Known for: Assassination of August von Kotzebue

Academic background
- Education: University of Tübingen; University of Erlangen; University of Jena
- Academic advisors: Jakob Friedrich Fries; Heinrich Luden; Lorenz Oken

Karl Ludwig Sand (5 October 1795 – 20 May 1820) was a German Protestant theology student and member of a liberal nationalist Burschenschaft (student association). He was executed in 1820 for the murder of the conservative dramatist August von Kotzebue the previous year in Mannheim. As a result of his execution, Sand became a martyr in the eyes of many German nationalists seeking the creation of a united German national state.

== Biography ==
Karl Ludwig Sand was born to Gottfried Christoph Sand and his wife Dorothea Johanna Wilhelmina Schöpf (1766–1826), on 5 October 1795. His siblings were George, Fritz, Caroline and Julia.

=== Education ===
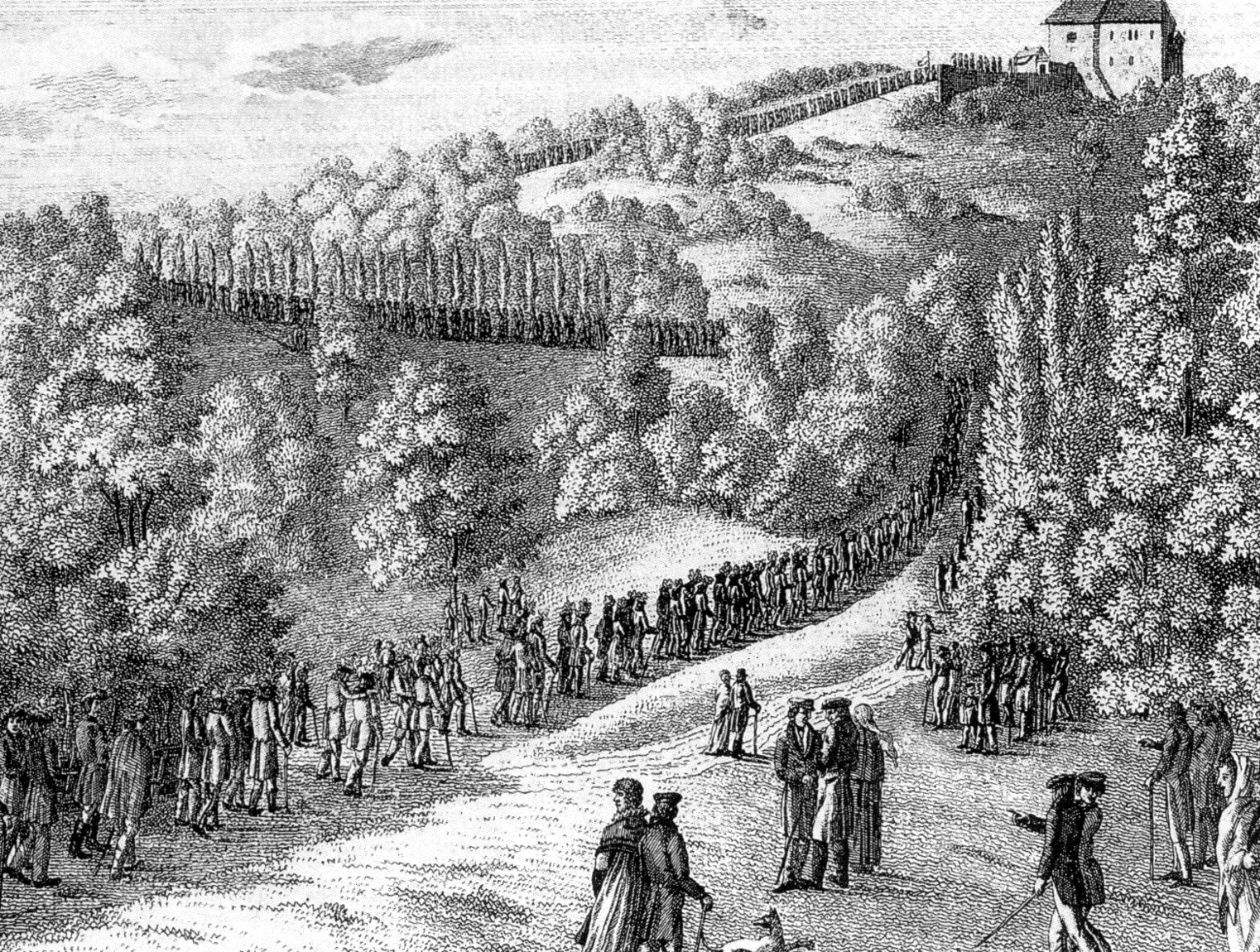
Students marching towards the Wartburg, of which Sand was one

In 1804 he attended the Lateinschule (Latin school) in Wunsiedel and in 1810 he moved on to the grammar school (Gymnasium) in Hof, living with the school's rector, Georg Heinrich Saalfrank, a friend of Sand's Enlightened Protestant family. Following the closure of the Hof Gymnasium on the institution of Montgelas's Reforms, Sand followed his teacher to the Neues Gymnasium (New Grammar School) in Regensburg, completing his studies in September 1814. In November 1814 Sand matriculated at the University of Tübingen.

In 1815, Sand volunteered under Major von Falkenhausen, participating in the Battle of Waterloo in June and in Paris by July. He returned from the war traumatized, disillusioned with its results, and fell into a deep depression. In 1816, while at the University of Erlangen, Sand formed Burschenschaft Teutonia with his friend Georg Friedrich Christoph Dittmar, meeting at castle ruins near Erlangen which they had named Ruttli. They built a meeting house for their group of 80 students. Sand's depression was further intensified by the destruction of Ruttli by the competing political group, the Landsmannschaft, and the drowning death of Dittmar in 1817. Starting in 1817 he studied at the University of Jena, attending the lectures of Jakob Friedrich Fries, Heinrich Luden and Lorenz Oken and joining further Burschenschaften. Sand was among the nationalist students who gathered at the 1817 Wartburg festival, in which Kotzebue's History of the German Empires was one of the books ceremoniously burned.

=== Murder of August von Kotzebue ===
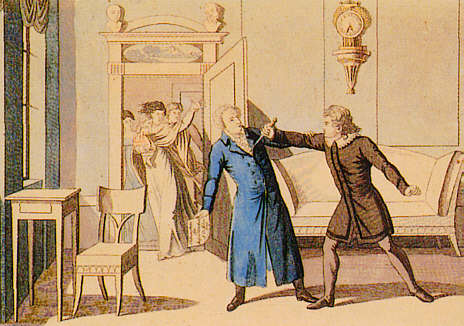
Illustration of Sand's attack on Kotzebue

Sand already contemplated the murder of August von Kotzebue in a diary entry of 5 May 1818. He called him a "traitor to the nation" and a "deceiver of the people" and characterized him as an enemy of the Burschenschaft.

On the morning of 23 March 1819 Sand, using the pseudonym Henry, visited Kotzebue in his Mannheim house. Refused entry to the house and told to return in the afternoon, Sand returned just before five o'clock. Having exchanged just a few words with Kotzebue, Sand produced a dagger and, with the words "Here, you traitor to the fatherland!", stabbed him repeatedly in the chest. Surprised by Kotzebue's four-year-old son witnessing the event from the nursery, Sand lost his wits and stabbed himself. Leaving the house, he handed a servant a piece of writing he had prepared ("Death to August von Kotzebue"), and stabbed himself again in the street. He survived his suicide attempt, and was taken to hospital.

== Aftermath ==
The Mannheim Hofgericht (court of law) sentenced Sand to death on 5 May 1820. He was beheaded by Franz Wilhelm Widmann, who was the official executioner at the time.

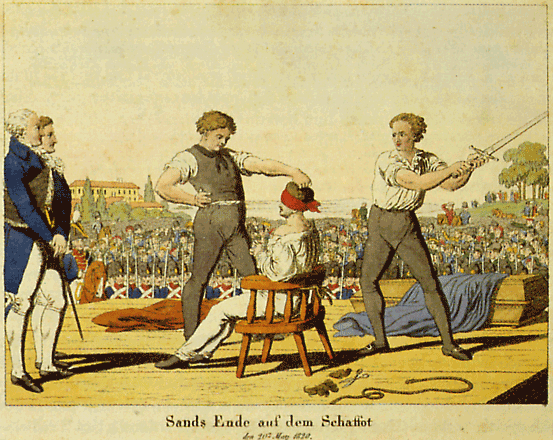
The execution of Karl Ludwig Sand

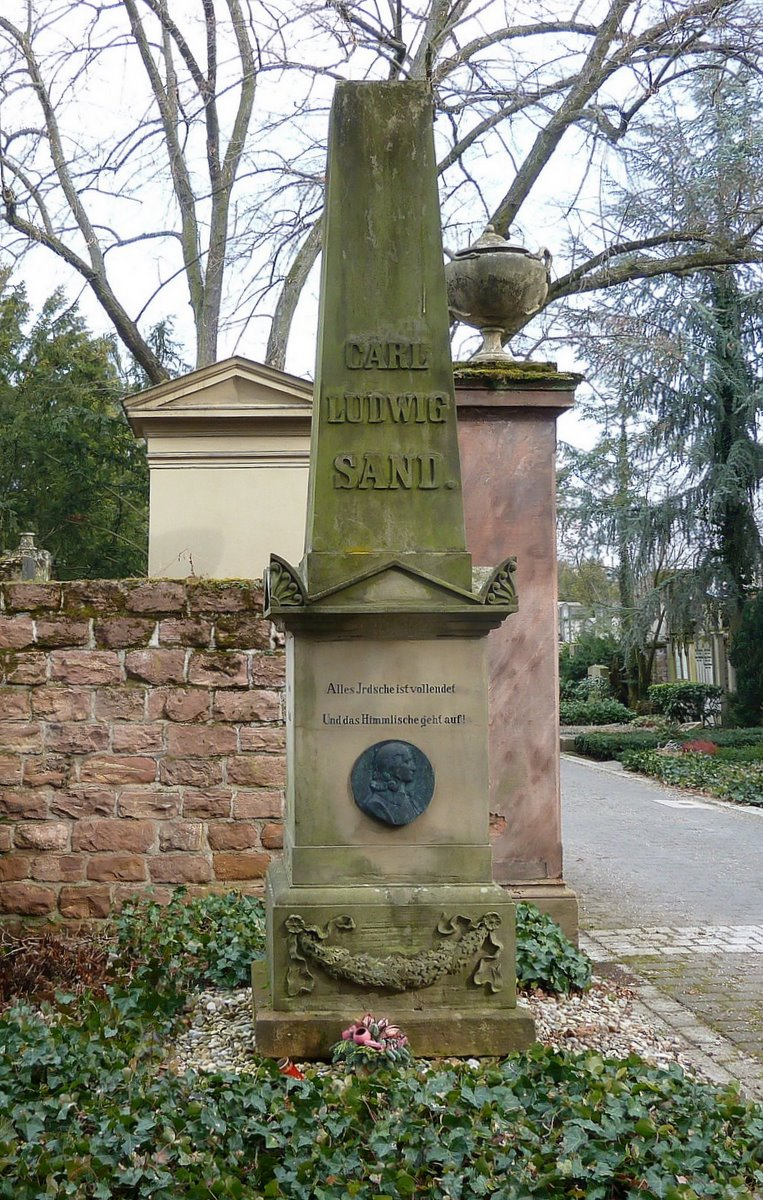
His grave in Mannheim

Sand's murder of Kotzebue was a catalyst for government restrictions on liberal and German nationalist thought. On 20 September 1819 Prince Klemens Wenzel von Metternich called a meeting of representatives from across the German Confederation to create the Carlsbad Decrees which outlawed the Burschenschaften and put limits on freedom of the press and the rights of members of such organizations, banning them from public office, teaching or studying at universities.

=== Depiction in literature ===
Alexandre Dumas, père wrote about Sand's life and published excerpts from his journals and letters in Karl Ludwig Sand, part of Famous Crimes. Prior to writing his story, Dumas visited Widmann's son in Mannheim in 1838 to gather information about Sand's character. Alexander Pushkin also memorialized Sand in his poem about assassins entitled "Kinzhal" (The Dagger).

=== Depiction in film ===
In Germany three films have been made concerning the events of Karl Sand's life: Karl Sand in 1964, Sand (Tankred Dorst) in 1971, and Die Unbedingten in 2009.

== Writings ==
- Gründung einer allgemeinen freien Burschenschaft, 1817
- Teutsche Jugend an die teutsche Menge, zum 18. October 1818
- Todesstoß dem August von Kotzebue, 1818/19, published posthumously.
