= Saul Ascher =

German writer, translator and bookseller

- Born: Saul ben Anschel Jaffe; 6 February 1767; Berlin
- Died: 8 December 1822 (aged 55); Berlin
- Occupations: Writer and Translator

Saul Ascher (6 February 1767 in Berlin – 8 December 1822 in Berlin) was a German writer, translator and bookseller.

== Life ==
Born Saul ben Anschel Jaffe, Saul Ascher was the first child of Deiche Aaron (c. 1744 Frankfurt – 1820 Berlin) and bank broker Anschel Jaffe (1745 Berlin – 1812 Berlin).

Details of his educational background are unknown, although it is believed he attended a Gymnasium in Landsberg an der Warthe (now Gorzów Wielkopolski) in 1785. Ascher married Rachel Spanier, daughter of Nathan Spanier (the head of the rural Ravensberg Jewish community), on 6 June 1789 in Hanover. On 6 October 1795, their only child was born, a daughter named Wilhelmine.

On 6 April 1810, Ascher was arrested in Berlin, but due to political pressure, he was released on April 25. On 6 October, he was awarded a doctoral degree in absentia from the Friedrichs University of Halle. At the same time, Prussian State Chancellor Karl August von Hardenberg dropped the original lawsuit against Ascher in Berlin.

In 1812, after the death of his father, Ascher received his certificate of citizenship. Ascher then joined the Jewish reform-oriented Gesellschaft der Freunde (Society of Friends) in 1816.

At the Wartburg Festival book-burning on 18 October 1817, Ascher's work "Die Germanomanie" ("Germanomania") was included within the books burned at the event.

Ascher died on 8 December 1822 due to exhaustion after becoming ill in October of the same year.

== Activity ==
Ascher had an extensive circle of friends including individuals such as Heinrich Zschokke whom Ascher met and befriended in 1789, Solomon Maimon, Johann Friedrich Cotta and Marx's teacher Eduard Gans. Heinrich Heine visited him in 1822, the year Ascher died. Throughout his life, Ascher was rejected as a Jewish theorist and writer. Leopold Zunz remarked in 1818 that Ascher was an "enemy of all fanaticism, against the Deutschtümler ("Germanomaniac")" and that "his moral character isn't appreciated".

Ascher was a prolific writer. His work can be divided into three different areas: as author, translator, and editor/publisher. The full extent of his work has until recently been insufficiently explored.

From an early stage in his career, Ascher was involved in the publishing industry. He ran a number of different publishing companies successively, as well as publishing his own works under various pseudonyms.

Ascher wrote both serious, complex pieces and simpler journalism as a correspondent, contributor and member for various magazines and publications, including the Berlin Monatsschrift, Berlin Archive of Time and Taste, Eunomia, General Literary Newspaper of Halle, Morning Paper for the Educated Classes of Cotta, Miscellany for New World Client by Zschokke, and the Journal de l'Empire.

Ascher founded and distributed at least two magazines himself. In 1810, amidst a precarious political climate, Ascher founded and distributed the magazine Welt-und Zeitgeist ("Spirit of the World and Times"). A variety of authors contributed to the six issues which were published up to 1811, including Ascher himself. In 1818 and 1819, Ascher published a further magazine, Der Falke, solely composed by himself and consisting of six issues. This publication had a more theoretical-critical focus.

== Teaching ==
In his first publication, "Bemerkungen über die bürgerliche Verbesserung der Juden" ("Remarks on the Civil Improvement of the Jews"), Ascher noted:

"Repression creates despondency of the spirit, contempt suppresses every germ of morality and education, tracking every germ of morality. No nation is more persecuted and despised than the Jewish."

Unlike other Jewish writers, Ascher was against Jews being forced to military service as this would only involve Jews of limited means, and not the upper classes. In 1799, his work "Ideen zur natürlichen Geschichte der politischen Revolutionen" ("Ideas on the natural history of political revolutions) was banned.

== Legacy ==
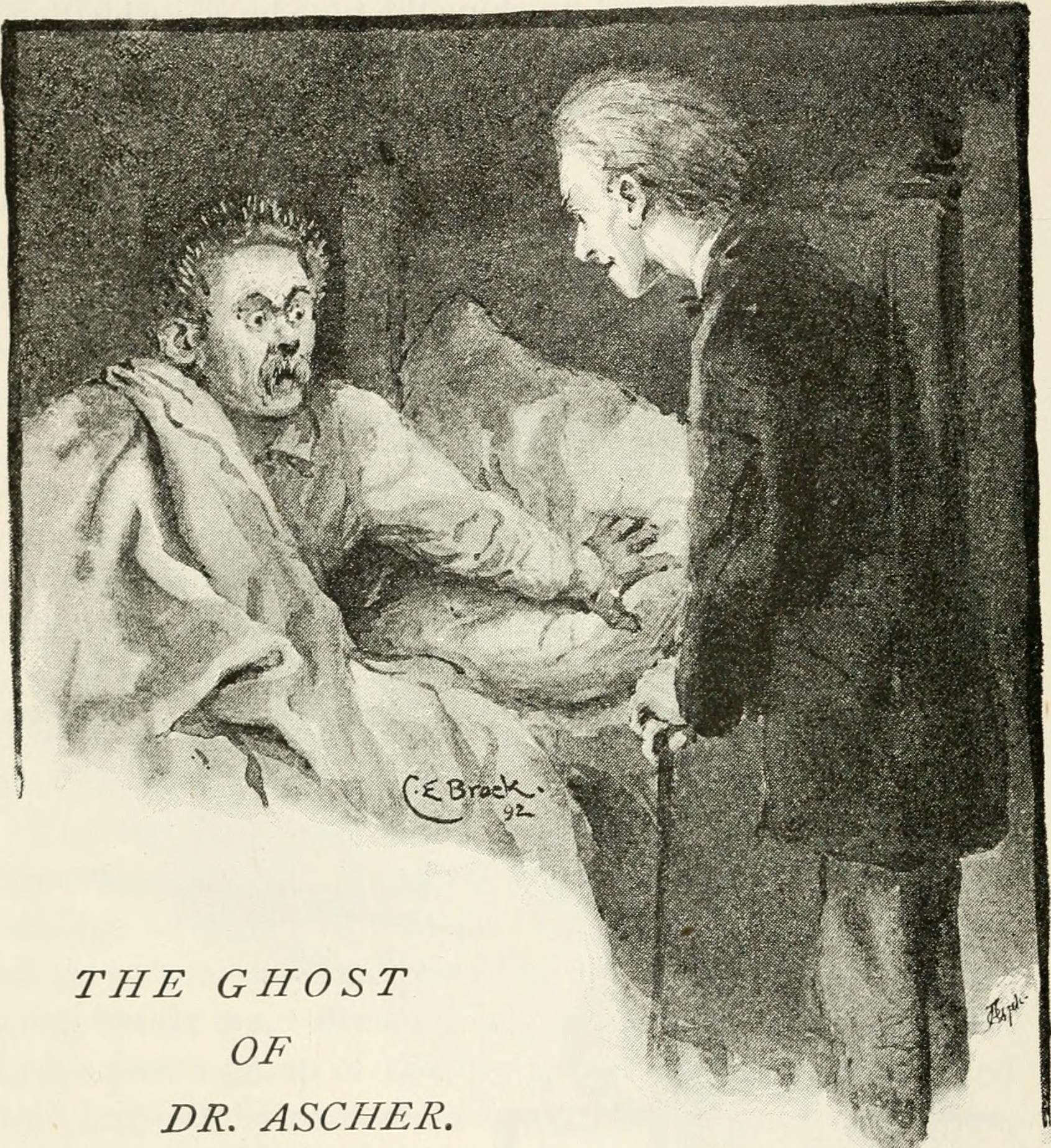
Illustration by C. E. Brock for The Ghost of Dr. Ascher as depicted in The humour of Germany (1909)

Historically, Ascher clearly lagged behind other contemporary representatives of emancipation, being ironically documented by Heinrich Heine in his work "Harz Journey" as a "doctor of reason". After Ascher's death, Heine described him as a ghost who attempts to disprove the existence of ghosts through Kant's work in "The Witching Hour", at the same time, Heine also explains that Ascher shaped his development. His influence in the development of others such as Heinrich von Kleist is discussed by literary historian (and school teacher) Reinhold Steig in his book entitled "Heinrich von Kleist's Berliner Kämpfe ("Berlin Flights"), published Stuttgart, 1901 - though Ascher's disputes were depicted in a one-sided and distorted manner.

Walter Grab was the first to analyse and discuss the life and works of Ascher in detail in a 1977 essay, sourcing a dissertation by Fritz Pinkuss (on Moses Mendelson) from 1928.

The famous Stalinist Playwright from the GDR, Peter Hacks made a case for recognising and politically evaluating Ascher's place in history. He published two essays (in 1989 and 1990), which were later combined under the title Ascher gegen Jahn (Ascher against Jahn).

In the context of modern scholarship on Romanticism, anti-Semitism and their relationship, Ascher is viewed as a counterpoint to Clemens Brentano and Achim von Arnim (see Puschner's study "Literature").

In a two-part essay, "The Falcon", André Thiele, last published in his collection "A World in Ruins" (2008), has presented preliminary work for a comprehensive biography of Ascher, as well as a bibliography of his works, which lists many more (ca. 50%) titles than were previously known.

In 2010, a single-volume selection of Saul Ascher's work was published by Böhlau Verlag, Bonn, as a commemorative work, and a year later the first volume of a comprehensive edition was published by André Thiele in Mainz.

Ascher's negative evaluation of Kantian rationalism—especially in its formulation by Fichte—as a "science of hating Judaism", has been credited by historian David Nirenberg as foresight into the development of a pseudo-science of Antisemitism that translated the Christian dialectic of supersession into the discourse of critical reason.

== Works ==
- Leviathan oder über Religion in Rücksicht des Judentums (Leviathan or religion in respect of Judaism) (1792)
- Eisenmenger der Zweite (Eisenmenger the Second) (1794)
- Philosophische Skizzen zur natürlichen Geschichte des Ursprungs, Fortschritts und Verfalls der gesellschaftlichen Verfassungen (Philosophical sketches of Natural History of the Origin, Progress and Decline of Social Constitutions) (1801)
- Orientalische Gemälde (Oriental Paintings) (1802)
- Ideen zur natürlichen Geschichte der politischen Revolutionen (Ideas for the Natural History of Political Revolutions) (1802)
- Kabinett Berlinischer Karaktere (Berlin Cabinet Character) (1808)
- Napoleon oder über den Fortschritt der Regierung (Napoleon or the Progress of the Government) (1808)
- Rousseau und sein Sohn (Rousseau and His Son) (1809)
- Historisch-romantische Gruppen (Historic-Romantic Groups) (1809)
- Romane, Erzählungen und Märchen (Novels, Short Stories and Tales) (2 Bde, erschienen 1810)
- Bagatellen aus dem Gebiete der Poesie, Kritik und Laune (Bagatelles of the Areas of Poetry, Criticism and Humor) (2 Bde, erschienen 1810–1811)
- Die Entthronung Alfonsos, Königs von Portugal (The Dethronement of Alfonso, King of Portugal) (1811)
- Die Germanomanie (The Germano Mania) (1815) online
- Idee einer Preßfreiheit und Censurordnung (Idea of Freedom of the Press and Censorship Regulation) (1818)
- Die Wartburgsfeier (The Wartburg Celebration) (1818)
- Ansicht von dem künftigen Schicksal des Christenthums (View of the Future Fate of Christianity) (1819)

Translations

- Henri Grégoire, Die Neger. Ein Beitrag zur Staats- und Menschenkunde. (1809)
- Auguste Lambert, Praxède oder der französische Werther. (1809)
- Charles Ganilh, Untersuchungen über die Systeme der politischen Ökonomie. (1811, anonym)
- Auguste Lambert, Schwärmereien der Liebe. (1816)
- Bernard v. Mandeville, Fabel von den Bienen. (1818, kommentiert)

Published post-mortem

- Ideen zur natürlichen Geschichte der Revolutionen, Kronberg/Ts. 1975
- 4 Flugschriften, Berlin und Weimar 1990
- Ascher gegen Jahn. Ein Freiheitskrieg. (Ascher against Jahn. A War of Freedom) 3 Bände (3 Volumes), edited by Peter Hacks. Together with: Ascher: Vier Flugschriften (Four pamphlets) und Friedrich Ludwig Jahn: Deutsches Volksthum. Inhaltsverzeichnis. Aufbau, Berlin 1991, ISBN 3-351-01629-8.
- Ausgewählte Werke. Hrsg. Renate Best, Köln 2010, ISBN 978-3-412-20451-8 (umfasst vier Texte)
- Werkausgabe. Theoretische Schriften, Band 1: Flugschriften, Hrsg. André Thiele, Mainz 2010, ISBN 978-3-940884-27-5 (umfasst sieben Essays)

== Literature ==
- Fritz Pinkuss: "Saul Ascher, ein Theoretiker der Judenemanzipation aus der Generation nach Moses Mendelssohn", in: Zeitschrift für die Geschichte der Juden in Deutschland VI (1936), S. 28–32.
- Hans Joachim Schoeps: Saul Ascher. In: Neue Deutsche Biographie (NDB). Band 1, Duncker & Humblot, Berlin 1953, ISBN 3-428-00182-6, S. 411 (Digitalisat)
- Walter Grab: "Saul Ascher. Ein jüdisch-deutscher Spätaufklärer zwischen Revolution und Restauration", in: Derselbe: Ein Volk muss seine Freiheit selbst erobern. Zur Geschichte der deutschen Jakobiner, Frankfurt 1984, S. 461–494.
- Peter Hacks: Ascher gegen Jahn. Ein Freiheitskampf, Berlin: Aufbau 1991.
- Christoph Schulte: Die jüdische Aufklärung: Philosophie, Religion, Geschichte, C.H. Beck, 2002, ISBN 3-406-48880-3.
- Marco Puschner: Antisemitismus im Kontext der politischen Romantik. Konstruktionen des „Deutschen“ und des „Jüdischen“ bei Arnim, Brentano und Saul Ascher. Niemeyer, Tübingen 2008 (Conditio Judaica, 72).
- André Thiele: "Der Falke", in: Derselbe: Eine Welt in Scherben, Mainz 2008, ISBN 978-3-940884-06-0, S. 39–64.
- Renate Best: Der Schriftsteller Saul Ascher. Im Spannungsfeld zwischen innerjüdischen Reformen und Frühnationalismus in Deutschland. In: Ascher: Ausgewählte Werke. Böhlau, Köln 2010, S. 7–57.
- William Hiscott: Germanomanie. In: Dan Diner (Hrsg.): Enzyklopädie jüdischer Geschichte und Kultur (EJGK). Band 2: Co–Ha. Metzler, Stuttgart/Weimar 2012, ISBN 978-3-476-02502-9, S. 431–434.
- Nirenberg, David (2014). Anti-Judaism: The Western Tradition. W. W. Norton & Company. ISBN 978-0-393-34791-3.
- William Hiscott: Saul Ascher. Berliner Aufklärer. Eine philosophiegeschichtliche Darstellung. Hrsg. v. Christoph Schulte und Marie Ch. Behrendt, 2017, ISBN 978-3-86525-552-5. (Rezension am 6. Januar 2018 von Irmela von der Lühe auf Literaturkritik.de)
- Bernd Fischer: Ein anderer Blick. Saul Aschers politische Schriften. Böhlau, Köln 2016, ISBN 978-3-205-20263-9
- Bernd Fischer: Saul Ascher. In: Michael Fahlbusch, Ingo Haar, Alexander Pinwinkler (Hrsg.): Handbuch der völkischen Wissenschaften. Akteure, Netzwerke, Forschungsprogramme. Unter Mitarbeit von David Hamann, Bd. 1, Berlin 2017, ISBN 978-3-11-042989-3, S. 44–49.
- Karl Erich Grözinger, Saul Ascher: Der religionswissenschaftliche Ansatz, in: K.E. Grözinger, Jüdisches Denken. Theologie-Philosophie-Mystik, Bd. 3: Von der Religionskritik der Renaissance zu Orthodoxie und Reform im 19. Jahrhundert. Frankfurt, New York 2009, S. 417–443.
