= Johannes Voigt =

German historian (1786–1863)

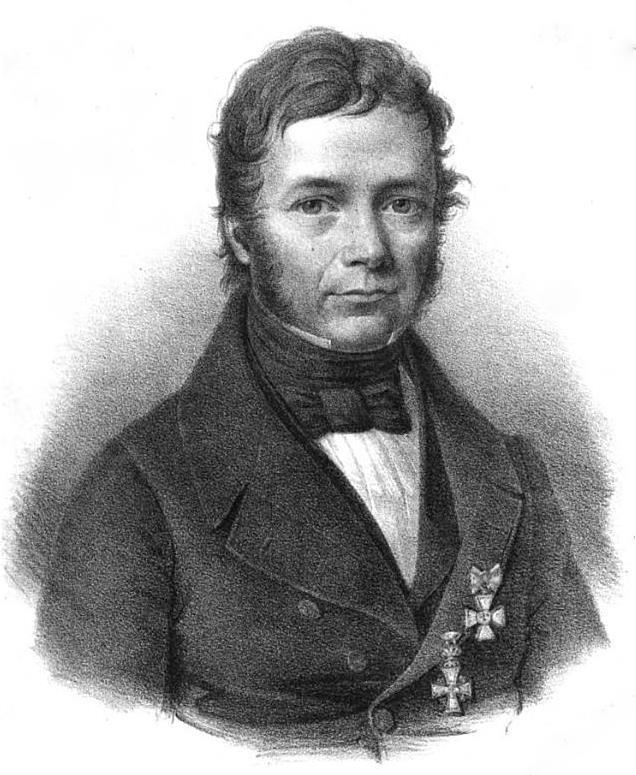
Johannes Voigt

Johannes Voigt (27 August 1786 – 23 September 1863) was a German historian, born in Bettenhausen in the Duchy of Saxe-Meiningen.

He studied history, theology and philology at the University of Jena, where two of his instructors were Heinrich Luden (1778-1847) and Johann Jakob Griesbach (1745–1812). After graduation, he was an instructor in Halle before becoming a professor at the University of Königsberg in 1817. He died in Königsberg. His son Georg Voigt (1827–1891) was a famous historian.

Johannes Voigt is remembered for his large number of writings concerning the history of Prussia. However, his best-known work was a book about Pope Gregory VII titled Hildebrand als Papst Gregor VII und sein Zeitalter. It is considered an important work because it is an impartial writing by a Protestant who depicts Gregory as a reformer.

== Works ==
- Hildebrand als Papst Gregor VII. und sein Zeitalter, Weimar 1815, second edition 1846 (Hildebrand as Pope Gregory VII and his Era).
- Geschichte des Lombardenbunds, Königsberg. 1818. (History of the Lombard League).
- Geschichte Preußens von den ältesten Zeiten bis zum Untergange der Herrschaft des Deutschen Ordens, Königsberg 1827-39, nine volumes (Prussian history from ancient times until the destruction of the rule of the Teutonic Knights).
- Codex diplomaticus prussicus, Königsberg 1836-61, six volumes.
- Die westfälischen Femgerichte in Bezug auf Preußen, Königsberg 1836.
- Briefwechsel der berühmtesten Gelehrten des Zeitalters der Reformation mit Herzog Albrecht von Preußen, Königsberg 1841.
- Handbuch der Geschichte Preußens bis zur Reformation, Königsberg 1842-43, three volumes (Handbook of the history of Prussia up to the Reformation).
- Geschichte des sogen. Tugendbunds, Königsberg 1850.
- Markgraf Albrecht Alcibiades von Brandenburg-Kulmbach Berlin 1852, two volumes (Margrave Albrecht Alcibiades of Brandenburg-Kulmbach).
- Geschichte des Deutschen Ritterordens Berlin 1857-59, two volumes, (History of the Teutonic Knights).
- Die Erwerbung der Neumark, Ziel und Erfolg der Brandenburgischen Politik unter den Kurfürsten Friedrich I. und Friedrich II 1402-1457, Berlin 1863. (The acquisition of the Neumark; Goal and success of the policy under Brandenburg Elector Frederick I and Frederick II, 1402-1457).
