= Wartburg Festival =

Student demonstration in 1817

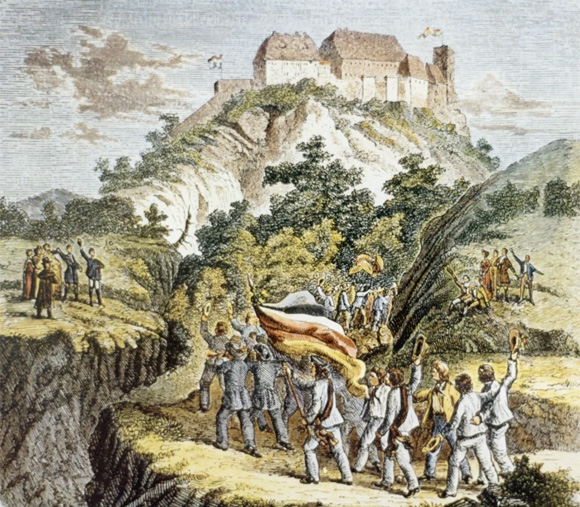
Students marching to the Wartburg in 1817

The first Wartburg Festival (German: Wartburgfest) was a convention of about 500 Protestant German students, held on 18 October 1817 at the Wartburg castle near Eisenach in Thuringia. The former refuge of reformer Martin Luther was considered a national symbol and the assembly a protest against reactionary politics and Kleinstaaterei.

== History ==
After the German "Wars of Liberation" against Napoleon and the French occupation, many people were bitter about dreams of German national unity shattered after the 1815 Congress of Vienna. Democratic reforms were stalled, and governments had cracked down on press freedom and rights of association.

On 12 June 1815 several corporated students at the University of Jena founded the Urburschenschaft organization in order to encourage German unity at the university. Many of them had participated as voluntary soldiers on the fields against Napoleon, e.g. in the Lützow Free Corps, the black-red-gold colour scheme of which was adopted for the Flag of Germany. The German students demonstrated for a national state and a liberal constitution condemning the "reactionary" forces in the newly recreated states of the German Confederation. At least, a constitution for the German state of Saxe-Weimar-Eisenach including articles on freedom of speech, press and assembly was amended by Grand Duke Karl August in 1816.

On the occasion of the three-hundredth anniversary of Martin Luther's nailing of his Ninety-five Theses on 31 October 1517 and to commemorate the fourth anniversary of the bloody Battle of Nations at Leipzig, the Burschenschaft student fraternities from the Jena and Halle universities agreed to organize a "national festival" at the Wartburg. The castle was chosen as a meeting place as it had been a refuge for Luther after he had been banned and was declared vogelfrei by Emperor Charles V in 1521. Inasmuch as he had translated the Bible there and thus set a standard for the German language, it became a symbol of German nationalism. Hundreds of students from Berlin, Breslau, Erlangen, Gießen, Göttingen, Greifswald, Heidelberg, Kiel, Königsberg, Leipzig, Marburg, Rostock and Tübingen joined the festivities. Jena professors such as Dietrich Georg von Kieser, Lorenz Oken, Heinrich Luden, and Jakob Friedrich Fries were also among the participants.

At the meeting in the Wartburg knights' hall, speeches were held about Martin Luther as a freedom fighter and the way to national unity. Followed by the Christian hymn Now Thank We All Our God as sung by the victorious Prussian troops after the 1757 Battle of Leuthen and a final blessing, the convention resembled a Protestant church service. The men eventually gathered for a festive meal and gave several toasts to the fallen of the Liberation Wars, Scharnhorst, Schill and Körner.

Invitations to Austrian universities had been blocked by the government of State Chancellor Metternich; the event itself was also used as a justification for further suppression of liberal forces, such as the Carlsbad Decrees of 1819. In 1832, the Hambacher Fest was held in similar manner. A second festival at the Wartburg was held during the Revolutions of 1848 in the German states.

== Book burning ==
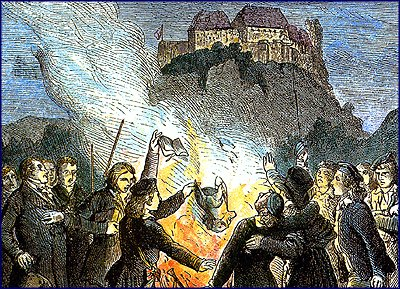
Book burning after the Wartburg festival

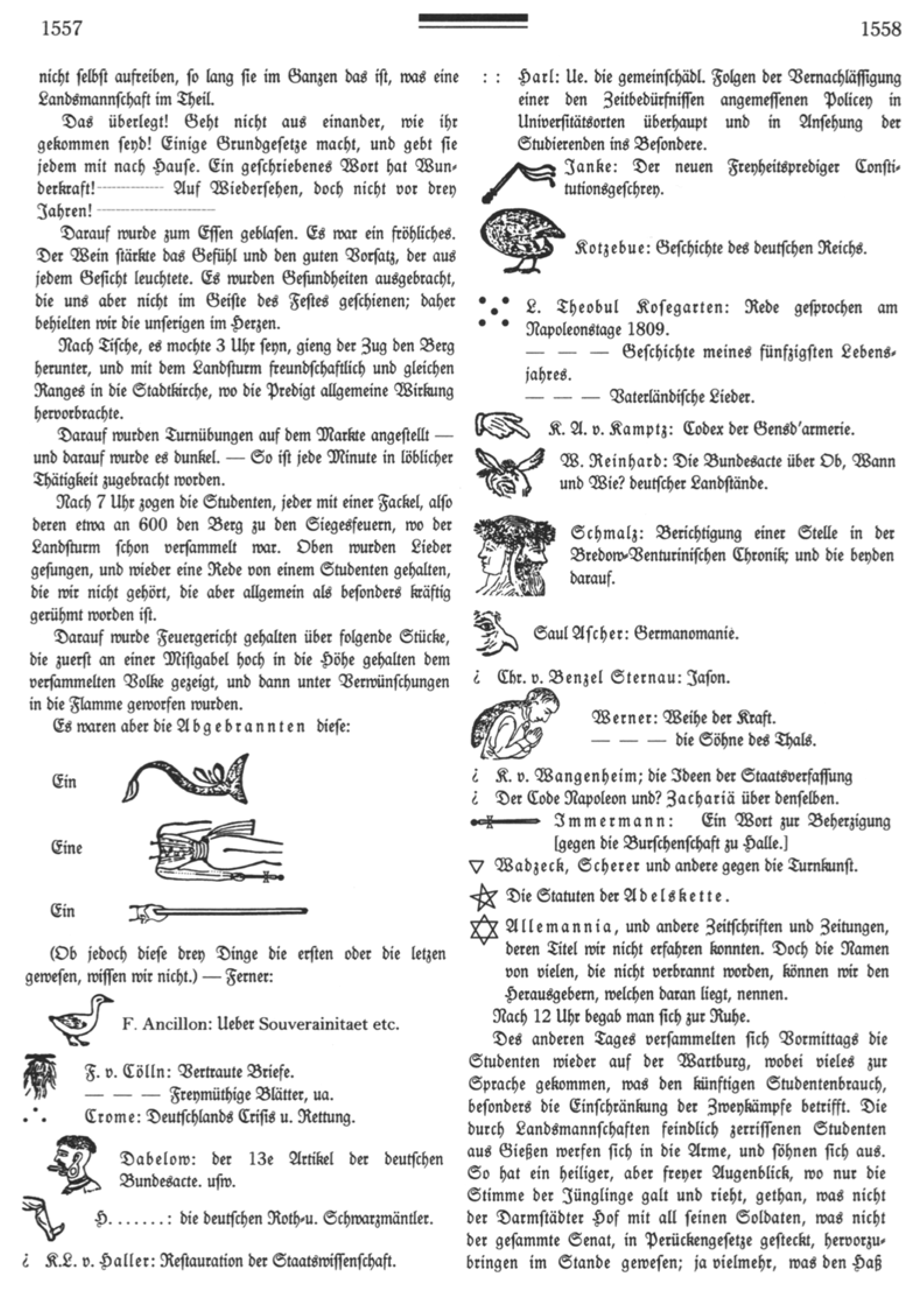
Contemporary report with a list of the burnt things

After the end of the official festivities and referring to Martin Luther's burning of the papal bull Exsurge domine in 1520, followers of "Turnvater" Friedrich Ludwig Jahn arranged a book burning with the burning of mocked books symbolizing a number of reactionary literary works, and symbols of Napoleon's foreign rule like a corporal's cane. This act was used in 1933 as a justification for the Nazi book burnings.

The symbolically burnt books comprised:

- Jean Pierre Frédéric Ancillon: Ueber Souverainitaet, etc. (De la souveraineté), ["On Sovereignty" (and the Forms of Government)]
- F. v. Cölln: Vertraute Briefe ["Private Letters"]. Freymüthige Blätter ["Candid Papers"]
- August Friedrich Wilhelm Crome: Deutschlands Crisis und Rettung im April und May 1813. ["Germany’s Crisis and Salvation in April and May, 1813"]
- Dabelow: Der 13e Artikel der deutschen Bundesacte ["The 13th Article of the Act of German Confederation"]
- Karl Ludwig von Haller: Restauration der Staatswissenschaft ["Restoration of Political Science"]
- August von Kotzebue: Geschichte des deutschen Reichs ["History of the German Realm"]
- Ludwig Theobul Kosegarten: Rede gesprochen am Napoleonstage 1800 ["Speech delivered on Napoleon’s Day, 1800'], Geschichte meines fünfzigsten Lebensjahres ["History of My Fiftieth Year of Life'], and Vaterländische Lieder ["Patriotic Songs"]
- Carl Albert Christoph Heinrich von Kamptz: Codex der Gensd'armerie ["Codex of the Gendarmerie"]
- W. Reinhard: Die Bundesacte über Ob, Wann und Wie? deutscher Landstände ["The Acts of the Confederation on Whether, When, and How? The State of the German Nation"]
- Schmalz: Berichtigung einer Stelle in der Bredow-Venturinischen Chronik; und die beyden darauf ["Account of a Passage in the Chronicle by Bredow and Venturini, and (the commentaries of) Both Thereon"]
- Saul Ascher: Germanomanie ["Germano-Mania"]
- Zacharias Werner: Martin Luther oder die Weihe der Kraft ["Martin Luther, or, The Consecration of Force"], Die Söhne des Thals ["The Sons of the Valley"]
- K. v. Wangenheim: Die Idee der Staatsverfassung ["The Notion of a National Constitution"]
- The Napoleonic Code
- Justus Friedrich Wilhelm Zachariae: Über den Code Napoleon ["On the Code Napoléon"]
- Karl Leberecht Immermann: Ein Wort zur Beherzigung (gegen die Burschenschaft zu Halle) ["A Word of Heed (Against the Student Association in Halle)"], 1814
