= Dietrich Georg von Kieser =

German physician (1779–1862)

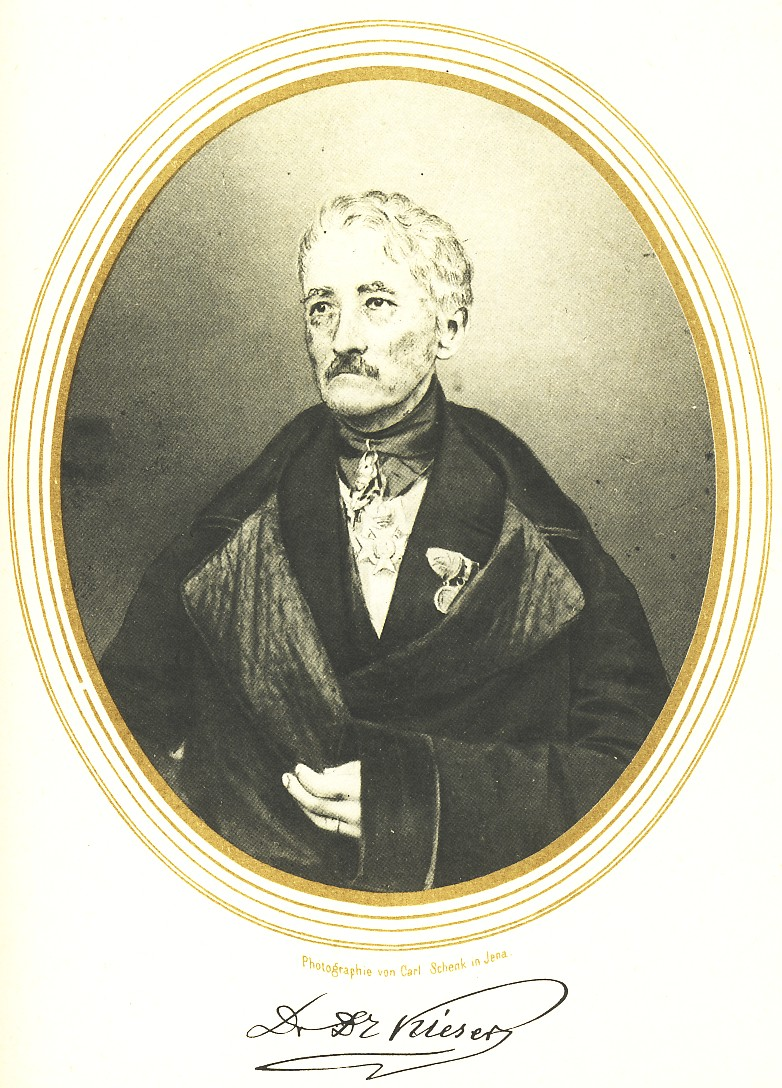
Dietrich Georg von Kieser

Dietrich Georg von Kieser (24 August 1779 – 11 October 1862) was a German medical doctor born in Harburg.

== Biography ==
He studied medicine at the Universities of Würzburg and Göttingen, receiving his doctorate from the latter institution in 1804. In 1806 he was named Stadt- und Landphysikus (city physician) of Northeim. For most of his career he was a professor at the University of Jena, where from 1824 to 1862 he served as a "full professor".

He was an advocate of balneology, and beginning in 1813 was a physician at the therapeutic spas at Heilbad Berka/Ilm. While working as a professor at the University of Jena, Kieser operated a private ophthalmology clinic from 1831 to 1847, and from 1847 until 1858 he was director of the mental hospital in Jena.

With Adolph Carl August von Eschenmayer and Christian Friedrich Nasse, he published the 12-volume Archiv für den thierischen Magnetismus ("Archive for animal magnetism"). Kieser was politically active throughout his career; in October 1817 with philosophers Lorenz Oken and Jakob Friedrich Fries, he partook in the historic Wartburg Festival. In 1858 he was named president of the Deutsche Akademie der Naturforscher Leopoldina. He died in Jena.

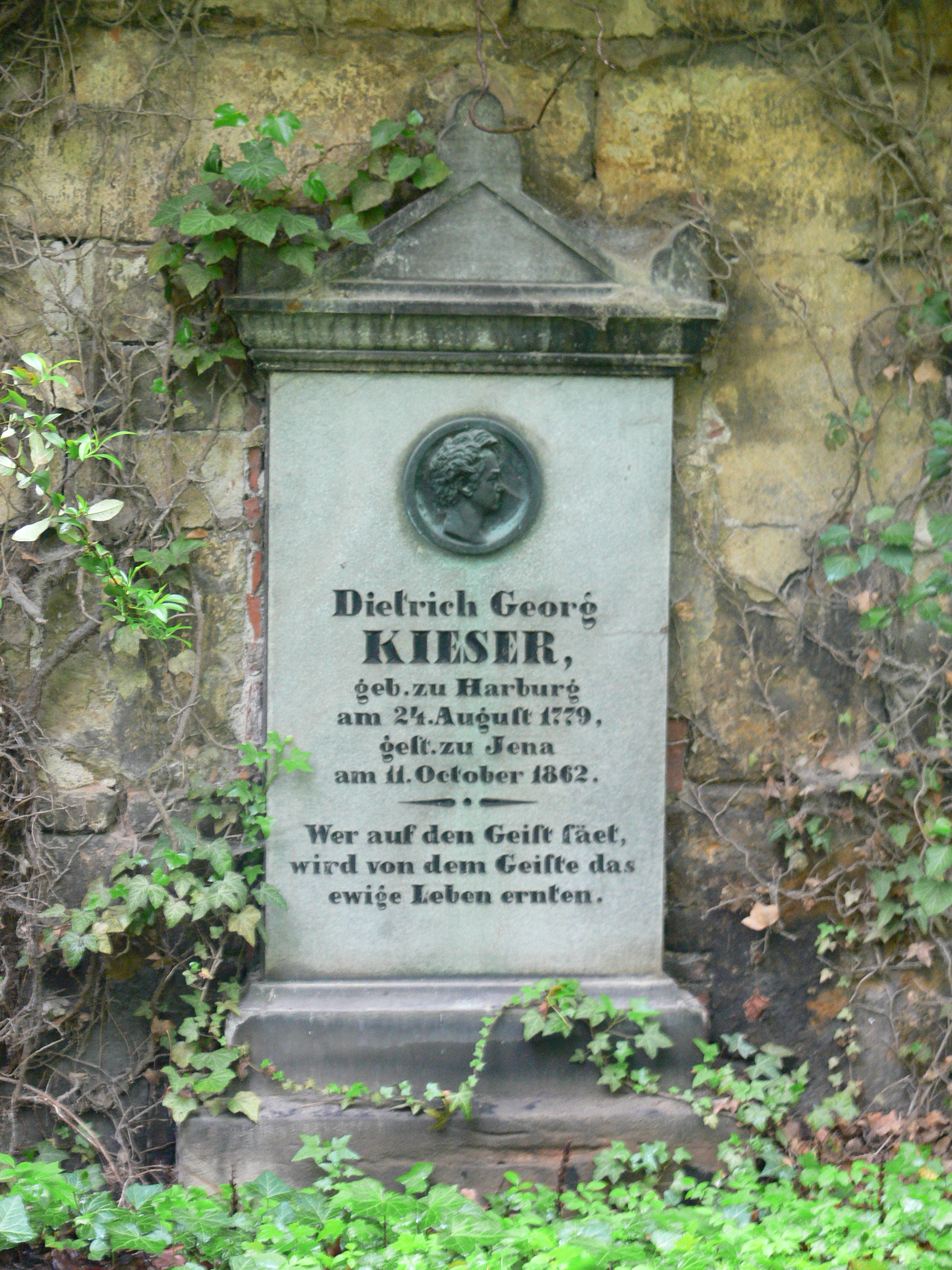
Gravesite of Kieser at the Johannisfriedhof in Jena

A magnesium sulfate mineral known as kieserite is named after him.

== Written works ==
- Archiv für den thierischen Magnetismus (Archive for animal magnetism); (1817 ff).
- Elemente der Physiatrik (Elements of the physiatric); (1855).

This was the first textbook illustrated with photographs.

- Grundzüge der Anatomie der Pflanzen (General outline of plant anatomy); (1815).
- Grundzüge der Pathologie und Therapie des Menschen (General outline of pathology and therapy of humans); (1812).
- Über die Emancipation des Verbrechers im Kerker (On the emancipation of the criminal in prison); (1845).
- Von den Leidenschaften und Affecten (1848).
