= Society of German Natural Scientists and Physicians =

Scientific association in Germany

The Society of German Natural Scientists and Physicians (German: Gesellschaft Deutscher Naturforscher und Ärzte, GDNÄ) is the oldest scientific association in Germany. It was founded in 1822 by the German naturalist Lorenz Oken. Carl Gustav Carus, Albert Einstein, Fritz Haber, Hermann von Helmholtz, Alexander von Humboldt, and Max Planck were all closely associated with the society and helped shape its development. The society currently has about 2,500 members. It hosts a meeting every two years in which developments in science and medicine are discussed.
