= Moritz Steinla =

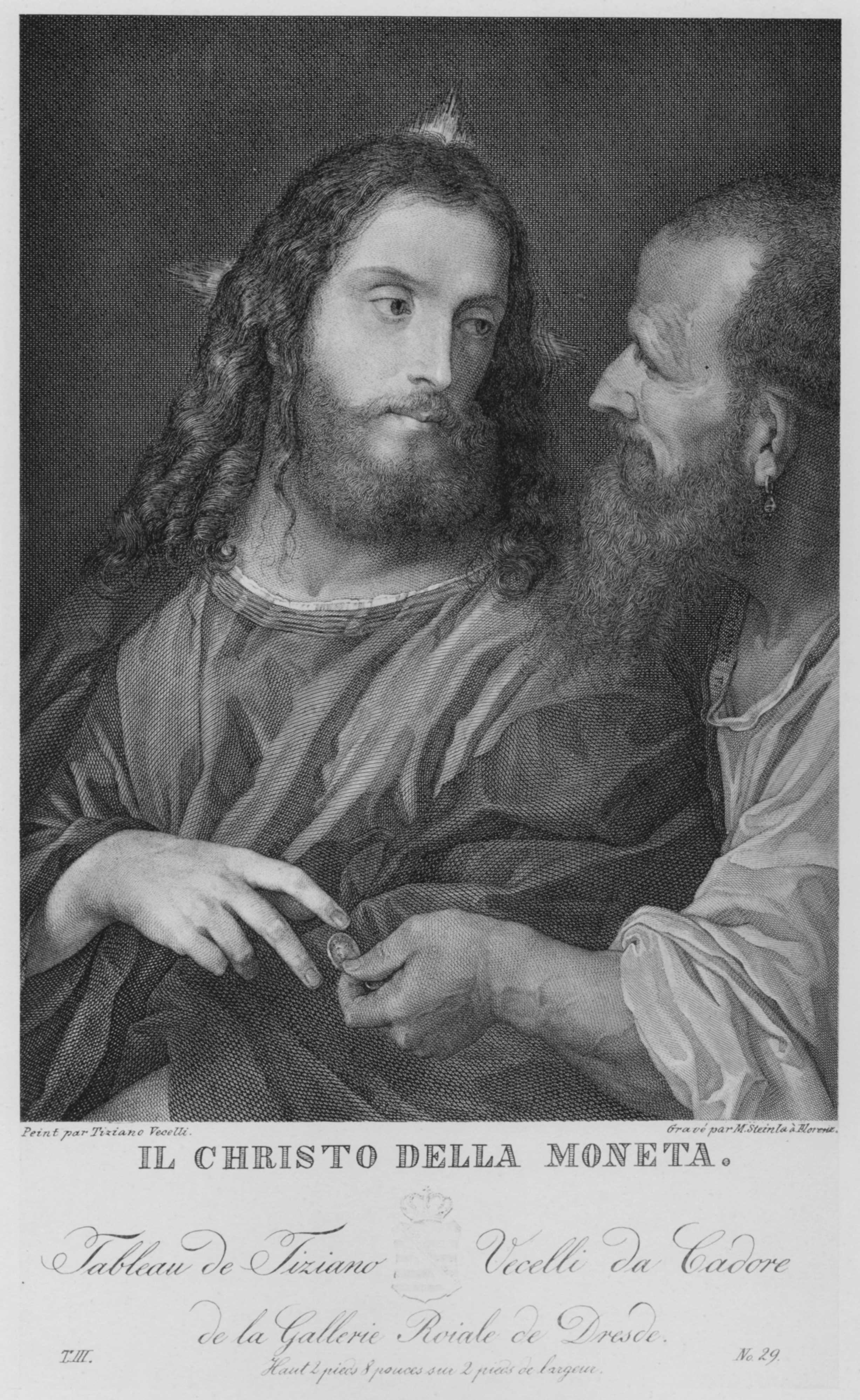
The Tribute Money. Engraving by Steinla, c. 1830, after the painting by Titian

Moritz Steinla (21 August 1791 – 21 September 1858) was a German engraver.

== Life ==
His family name was Müller; he took the name Steinla after his place of birth, Steinlah near Hildesheim, when his work became well known.

After studying at the Dresden Academy, he went to Italy and studied with Giuseppe Longhi and Raffaello Sanzio Morghen. From about 1838 he was professor of copper engraving at the Dresden Academy. remaining in the post until 1 April 1858, the year of his death.

His works include engravings based on paintings by Titian, Raphael and Fra Bartolomeo.

Steinla died in Dresden in 1858. He had a large collection of paintings, copper engravings, coins and fossils; this mostly came into the possession of the royal collections at Dresden.
