= Lorenz Oken =

German naturalist (1779–1851)

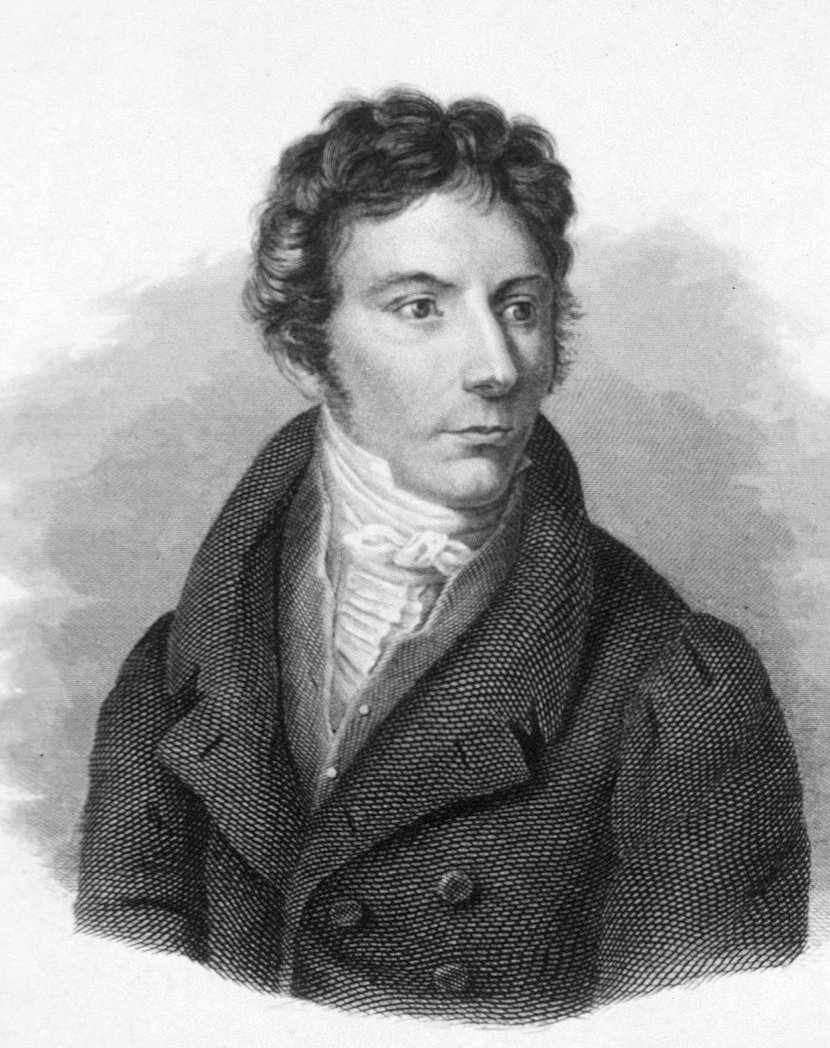
- Born: Lorenz Okenfuß; 1 August 1779; Bohlsbach, Further Austria, Holy Roman Empire
- Died: 11 August 1851 (aged 72); Zurich, Switzerland
- Education: University of Freiburg; University of Würzburg
- Scientific career
- Fields: Natural history
- Workplaces: University of Jena; University of Zurich
- Notable students: Karl Ludwig Sand
- Author abbrev. (botany): Oken
- Author abbrev. (zoology): Oken

Lorenz Oken (born Lorenz Okenfuß; 1 August 1779 – 11 August 1851) was a German naturalist, botanist, biologist, and ornithologist. He became a professor of natural history at the University of Jena and from 1833 at the newly founded University of Zurich. He founded the journal Isis.

== Biography ==
Oken was born Lorenz Okenfuss (German: Okenfuß) in Bohlsbach (now part of Offenburg), Ortenau, Baden, on 1 August 1779. and studied natural history and medicine at the universities of Freiburg and Würzburg. He went on to the University of Göttingen, where he became a Privatdozent (unsalaried lecturer), and shortened his name to Oken. As Lorenz Oken, he published a small work entitled Grundriss der Naturphilosophie, der Theorie der Sinne, mit der darauf gegründeten Classification der Thiere (1802). This was the first of a series of works which established him as a leader of the movement of "Naturphilosophie" in Germany.

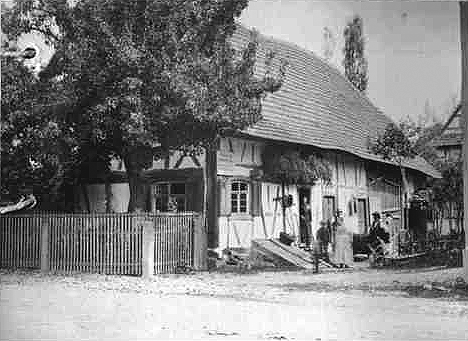
Birthplace in Ortenau (Bohlsbach, Baden). Old picture postcard from 1880.

In it he extended to physical science the philosophical principles which Immanuel Kant (1724–1804) had applied to epistemology and morality. Oken had been preceded in this by Johann Gottlieb Fichte (1762–1814), who, acknowledging that Kant had discovered the materials for a universal science, declared that all that was needed was a systematic coordination of these materials. Fichte undertook this task in his "Doctrine of Science" (Wissenschaftslehre), whose aim was to construct all knowledge by a priori means. This attempt, which was merely sketched out by Fichte, was further elaborated by the philosopher Friedrich Schelling (1775–1854). Oken built on Schelling's work, producing a synthesis of what he held Schelling to have achieved.

Oken produced the seven-volume series Allgemeine Naturgeschichte für alle Stände, with engravings by Johann Susemihl (1767–1847), and published in Stuttgart by Hoffman between 1839 and 1841.

== New system of animal classification ==
In the Grundriss der Naturphilosophie of 1802 Oken sketched the outlines of the scheme he afterwards devoted himself to perfecting. The position advanced in that work, to which he continued to adhere, is that "the animal classes are virtually nothing else than a representation of the sense-organs, and that they must be arranged in accordance with them." Consequently, Oken contended that there are only five animal classes based on the most developed organs in them:

1. Dermatozoa, or invertebrates
2. Glossozoa, or fish, those animals in which a true tongue makes, for the first time, its appearance
3. Rhinozoa, or reptiles, in which the nose opens for the first time into the mouth and inhales air
4. Otozoa, or birds, in which the ear for the first time opens externally
5. Ophthalmozoa, or mammals, in which all the organs of sense are present and complete, the eyes being movable and covered with lids.

In 1805, Oken made a further advance in the application of the a priori principle in a book on generation (Die Zeugung), in which he maintained that "all organic beings originate from and consist of vesicles or cells. These vesicles, when singly detached and regarded in their original process of production, are the infusorial mass or protoplasma (Urschleim) whence all larger organisms fashion themselves or are evolved. Their production is therefore nothing else than a regular agglomeration of Infusoria—not, of course, of species already elaborated or perfect, but of mucous vesicles or points in general, which first form themselves by their union or combination into particular species."

A year after the production of this treatise, Oken developed his system one stage further, and in a volume published in 1806, written with the assistance of Dietrich von Kieser (1779–1862), entitled Beiträge zur vergleichenden Zoologie, Anatomie, und Physiologie, he demonstrated that the intestines originate from the umbilical vesicle, and that this corresponds to the vitellus or yolk-bag. Caspar Wolff (1735–1794) had previously claimed to demonstrate this fact in the chick (Theoria Generationis, 1774), but he did not see its application as evidence of a general law. Oken showed the importance of the discovery as an illustration of his system. In the same work Oken described and recalled attention to the corpora Wolffiana, or "primordial kidneys".

== University of Jena ==
The reputation of the young Privatdozent of Göttingen had reached the ear of Johann von Goethe (1749–1832), and in 1807 Oken was invited to fill the office of Extraordinary Professor of the Medical Sciences at the University of Jena. He selected for the subject of his inaugural discourse his ideas on the "Signification of the Bones of the Skull", based on a discovery of the previous year. This lecture was delivered in the presence of Goethe, as privy councillor and rector of the university, and was published in the same year, with the title, Ueber die Bedeutung der Schädelknochen. With regard to the origin of the idea, Oken narrates in his Isis that, walking one autumn day in 1806 in the Harz forest, he stumbled on the blanched skull of a deer, picked up the partially dislocated bones, and contemplated them for a while, when it suddenly occurred to him, "It is a vertebral column!" At a meeting of the German naturalists held at Jena some years afterwards, Professor Kieser gave an account of Oken's discovery in the presence of the grand duke, which is printed in the Tageblatt, or "proceedings", of that meeting. The professor stated that Oken told him of his discovery when journeying in 1806 to the island of Wangerooge. On their return to Göttingen, Oken explained his ideas by reference to the skull of a turtle in Kieser's collection, which he disarticulated for that purpose. Kieser displayed the skull, its bones marked in Oken's handwriting.

Oken's lectures at Jena were wide-ranging, and were highly regarded at the time. The subjects included natural philosophy, general natural history, zoology, comparative anatomy, the physiology of man, of animals and of plants. The spirit with which he grappled with the vast scope of science is characteristically illustrated in his essay Ueber das Universum als Fortsetzung des Sinnensystems (1808). In this work he lays it down that "organism is none other than a combination of all the universe's activities within a single individual body." This doctrine led him to the conviction that "world and organism are one in kind, and do not stand merely in harmony with each other." In the same year he published his Erste Ideen zur Theorie des Lichts, &c., in which he advanced the proposition that "light could be nothing but a polar tension of the ether, evoked by a central body in antagonism with the planets, and heat was none other than a motion of this ether"—a sort of vague anticipation of the doctrine of the "correlation of physical forces".

In 1809 Oken extended his system to the mineral world, arranging the ores, not according to the metals, but according to their combinations with oxygen, acids and sulphur. In 1810 he summed up his views on organic and inorganic nature into one compendious system. In the first edition of the Lehrbuch der Naturphilosophie, which appeared in that and the following years, he sought to bring his different doctrines into mutual connection, and to "show that the mineral, vegetable and animal kingdoms are not to be arranged arbitrarily in accordance with single and isolated characters, but to be based upon the cardinal organs or anatomical systems, from which a firmly established number of classes would necessarily be evolved; that each class, moreover, takes its starting-point from below, and consequently that all of them pass parallel to each other"; and that, "as in chemistry, where the combinations follow a definite numerical law, so also in anatomy the organs, in physiology the functions, and in natural history the classes, families, and even genera of minerals, plants, and animals present a similar arithmetical ratio." The Lehrbuch procured for Oken the title of Hofrath, or court-councillor, and in 1812 he was appointed ordinary professor of the natural sciences.

== Journal Isis ==
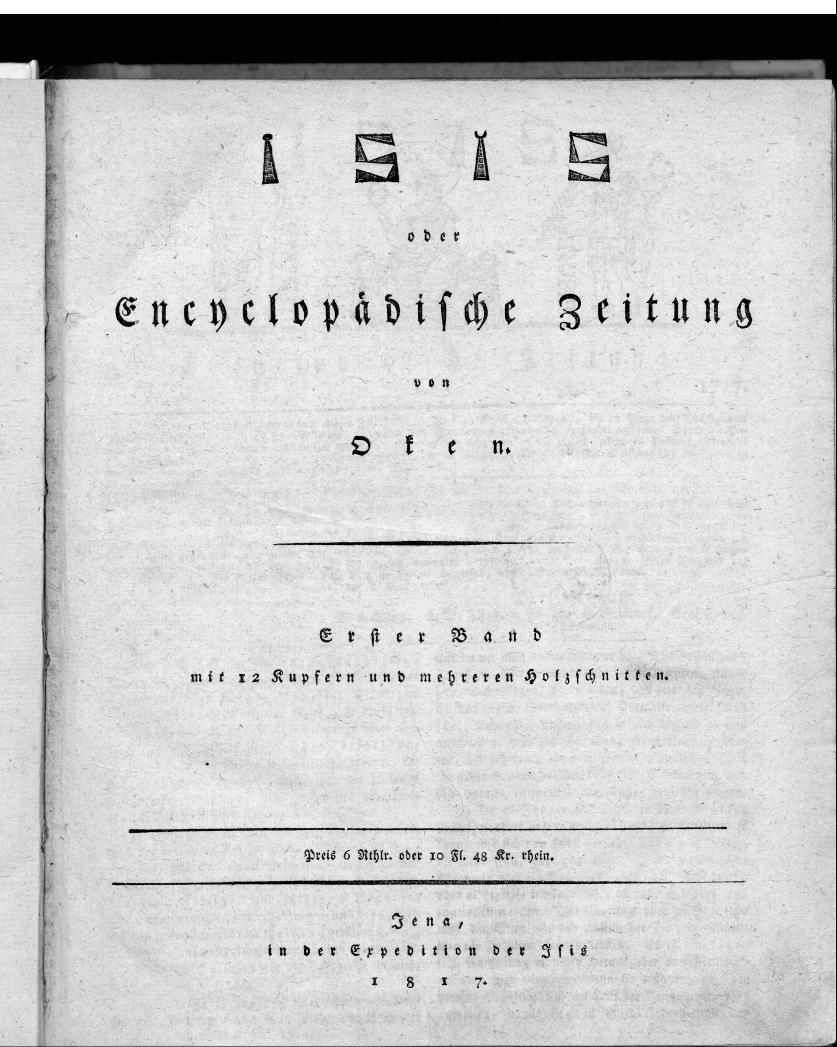
Isis frontispiece (1817)

In 1816, Oken began publication of his well-known periodical, Isis, eine encyclopädische Zeitschrift, vorzüglich für Naturgeschichte, vergleichende Anatomie und Physiologie. In this journal appeared essays and notices on the natural sciences and other subjects of interest; poetry, and even comments on the politics of other German states, were occasionally admitted. This led to representations and remonstrances from the governments criticized or impugned, and the court of Weimar called upon Oken either to suppress Isis or resign his professorship. He chose the latter alternative. The publication of Isis at Weimar was prohibited. Oken made arrangements for its issue at Rudolstadt, and this continued uninterruptedly until the year 1848.

In 1821, Oken promulgated in Isis the first idea of the annual general meetings of the Society of German Natural Scientists and Physicians, which was realized in the following year, when the first meeting was held at Leipzig. The British Association for the Advancement of Science was at the outset avowedly organized after the German or Okenian model. In 1828, Oken resumed his original humble duties as privatdocent in the newly established Ludwig-Maximilians-Universität München, and soon afterwards he was appointed ordinary professor in the same university. In 1832, on the proposal by the Bavarian government to transfer him to a professorship in a provincial university of the state, he resigned his appointments and left the kingdom. He was appointed in 1833 to the professorship of natural history in the then recently established University of Zurich. There he continued to reside, fulfilling his professional duties and promoting the progress of his favourite sciences, until his death on 11 August 1851.

== Homological views ==
All of Oken's writings are deductive illustrations of an assumed principle, which, with other philosophers of the transcendental school, he deemed equal to the explanation of all the mysteries of nature. According to him, the head was a repetition of the trunk—a kind of second trunk, with its limbs and other appendages; this sum of his observations and comparisons—few of which he ever gave in detail—ought always to be borne in mind in comparing the share taken by Oken in homological anatomy with the progress made by other cultivators of that philosophical branch of the science. The idea of the analogy between the skull, or parts of the skull, and the vertebral column had been previously propounded and ventilated in their lectures by Johann von Autenrieth (1772–1835) and Carl Kielmeyer (1765–1844), and in the writings of Johann Frank (1745–1821). By Oken it was applied chiefly in illustration of the mystical system of Schelling—the "all-in-all" and "all-in-every-part". From the earliest to the latest of Oken's writings on the subject, "the head is a repetition of the whole trunk with all its systems: the brain is the spinal cord; the cranium is the vertebral column; the mouth is intestine and abdomen; the nose is the lungs and thorax; the jaws are the limbs; and the teeth the claws or nails." Johann von Spix (1781–1826) in his folio Cephalogenesis (1818), richly illustrated comparative craniology, but presented the facts under the same transcendental guise; and Georges Cuvier (1769–1832) availed himself of the extravagances of these disciples of Schelling to cast ridicule on the whole inquiry into those higher relations of parts to the archetype which Sir Richard Owen (1804–1892) called "general homologies".

The vertebral theory of the skull had practically disappeared from anatomical science when the labours of Cuvier drew to their close. In Owen's Archetype and Homologies of the Vertebrate Skeleton the idea was not only revived but worked out for the first time inductively, and the theory rightly stated, as follows: "The head is not a virtual equivalent of the trunk, but is only a portion, i.e. certain modified segments, of the whole body. The jaws are the 'haemal arches' of the first two segments; they are not limbs of the head" (p. 176).

Vaguely and strangely, however, as Oken had blended the idea with his a priori conception of the nature of the head, the chance of appropriating it seems to have overcome the moral sense of Goethe—unless indeed the poet deceived himself. Comparative osteology had early attracted Goethe's attention. In 1786 he published at Jena his essay Ueber den Zwischenkieferknochen des Menschen und der Thiere, showing that the intermaxillary bone existed in man as well as in brutes. But not a word in this essay gives the remotest hint of his having then possessed the idea of the vertebral analogies of the skull. In 1820, in his Morphologie, he first publicly stated that thirty years before the date of that publication he had discovered the secret relationship between the vertebrae and the bones of the head, and that he had always continued to meditate on this subject. The circumstances under which the poet, in 1820, narrates having become inspired with the original idea are suspiciously analogous to those described by Oken in 1807, as producing the same effect on his mind. A bleached skull is accidentally discovered in both instances: in Oken's it was that of a deer in the Harz forest; in Goethe's it was that of a sheep picked up on the shores of the Lido, at Venice.

It may be assumed that Oken, as a Privatdozent at Göttingen in 1806, knew nothing of this unpublished idea or discovery of Goethe, and that Goethe first became aware that Oken had the idea of the vertebral relations of the skull when he listened to the introductory discourse in which the young professor, invited by the poet to Jena, selected this very idea for its subject. It is incredible that Oken, had he adopted the idea from Goethe, or been aware of an anticipation by him, should have omitted to acknowledge the source—should not rather have eagerly embraced so appropriate an opportunity of doing graceful homage to the originality and genius of his patron.

In 1832, Oken was elected a foreign member of the Royal Swedish Academy of Sciences.

== Works ==
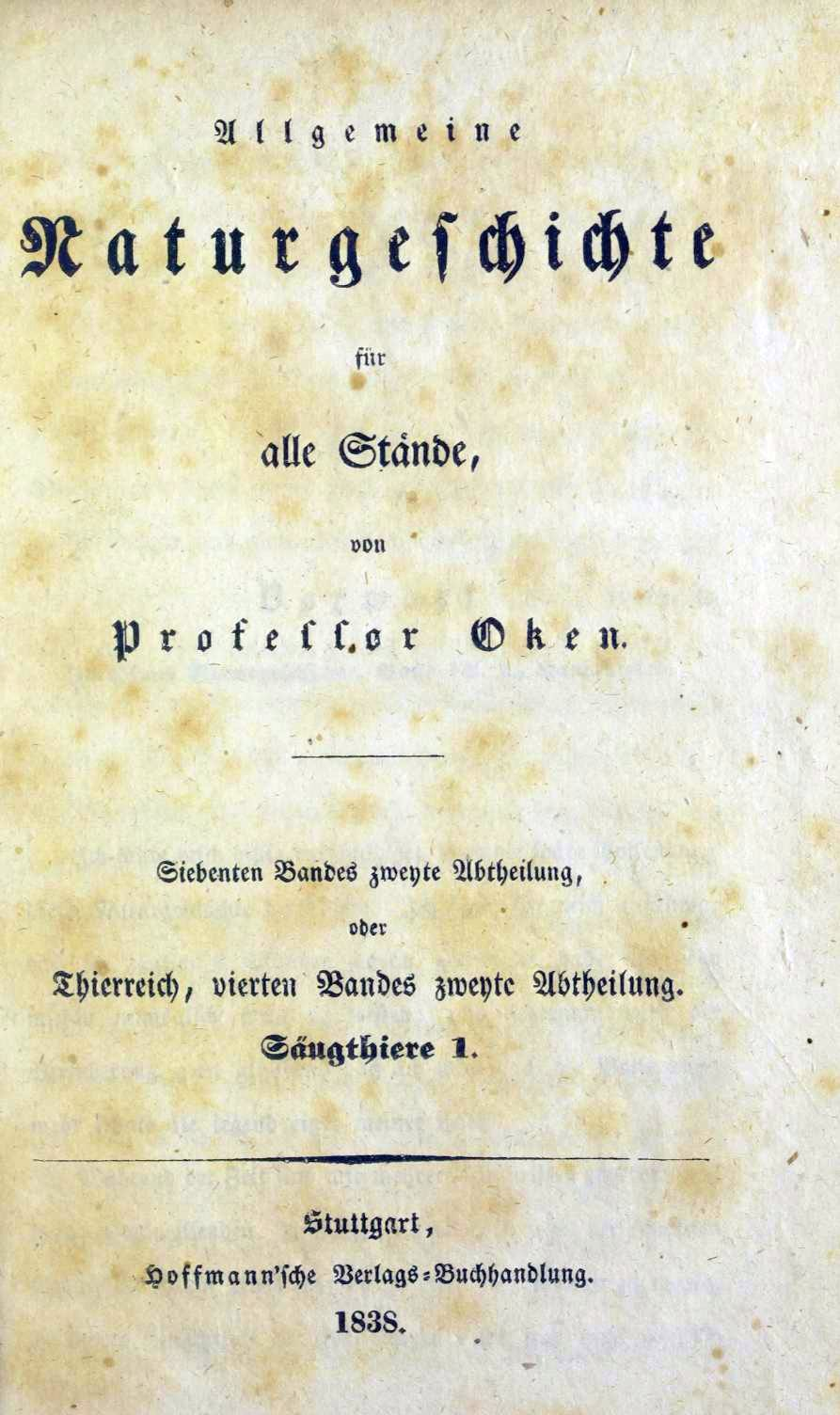
Thierreich, 1838

- Man is Menagerie and Milky Way: Science and Idealism in the 19th Century. Early Works by Lorenz Oken, tr. Scott Elliot Hicks (Amazon, 2026).
- Allgemeine Naturgeschichte für alle Stände. Vol.1–8 . Hoffmann, Stuttgart 1833-1843 Digital edition by the University and State Library Düsseldorf
- Abbildungen zu Okens allgemeiner Naturgeschichte für alle Stände. Hoffmann, Stuttgart 1843 Digital edition by the University and State Library Düsseldorf

== See also ==
- Category:Taxa named by Lorenz Oken
