= Bambach =

Bambach is a surname. Notable people with the surname include:

- Carmen C. Bambach (born 1959), American art historian and curator
- Charles Bambach, American philosopher
- Laura Jordan Bambach, Australian digital designer, creative director and feminist
