= Black Notebooks =

Works by Martin Heidegger

The Black Notebooks (German: Schwarze Hefte) are a set of 34 notebooks written by German philosopher Martin Heidegger (1889–1976) between October 1931 and 1970. They were originally a set of small notebooks with black covers in which Heidegger jotted observations (sometimes called "sketches").

Heidegger called the Black Notebooks the “workshop notes” (“Werkstattaufzeichnungen”). One of Heidegger's assistants, Friedrich-Wilhelm von Herrmann, said the Notebooks were kept on a table next to Heidegger's bed, and that Heidegger wrote in the notebooks at night before going to sleep.

== Format and titles ==
The Black Notebooks are about 5 1/4 × 7 1/2 inches, approximately in DIN format D5 (136 × 192 mm).

- Fifteen bear the title “Ponderings,” (Überlegungen);
- Nine are called “Annotations” (Anmerkungen);
- Two “Four Notebooks” (Vier Hefte);
- Two “Vigilae”;
- One “Notturno”;
- Two “Intimations” (Winke);
- Four are named “Provisional Remarks” (Vorläufiges)

Two additional manuscripts have been mentioned in association with the Black Notebooks. Those are “Megiston” and “Grundworte” (Zum Sagen der Grundworte - "To speak plainly").

== Publication ==
Peter Trawny edited the manuscripts, and they were added to Heidegger's existing collected writings, Gesamtausgabe (GA), published by Vittorio Klostermann.

There are nine volumes published; from GA 94, (Note: The abbreviation 'GA' refers to the collected Heidegger works known as "Gesamtausgabe". The number following the abbreviation points to the volumes 94–102, which comprise the Notebooks, and may be followed by the page number.) 1931-1938 until the final volume GA 102, 1963–1970. There are 34 notebooks in this group and about 3384 published pages.

The first manuscript was published in 2014. The first notebook, Anmerkungen I, now GA 97, was originally believed to be lost, but was found in the possession of Heidegger scholar Silvio Vietta.

One notebook written in approximately 1930, sometimes called: “Winke Überlegungen (I)”, is still missing (GA 97 p. 521 note).

In 2022 Vorläufiges I–IV [ Preliminaries] was published as GA 102; and according to Klostermann in the published notes (GA 102) this is the last of the Black Notebooks, a total of 33 notebooks, published as nine volumes, of 3384 pages.

According to Trawny in 2015: “In addition, two further booklets with the titles "Megiston" and "Grundworte” [basic words] were found in the DLA Marbach archives. (Note: The DLA is the German Literature Archive (Deutsches Literaturarchiv), a research-focussed library and museum in Marbach, Germany.) Whether and how they belong to the "Black Books" has yet to be clarified”. (GA 97, page 521). Heidegger himself mentions Grundworte in the text (GA 99, page 64); and Trawny (2019) says in a footnote at the bottom of the page, “publication nothing has been decided yet” (GA 99, page 64).

The publisher's notes suggest that by the time Heidegger was writing the last four of the Notebooks, published in GA 102, he was writing in a calmer, simpler style than previously, observing that: "Instead, a surprising preoccupation with 'cybernetics', 'industrial society', and even the 'computer' emerges. The penultimate entry of the notebooks, written in a handwriting that is difficult to decipher, defines 'thinking' as 'an inaudible conversation with the escaped gods'."

== Reception ==
The notebooks contain content criticized as antisemitic, which at the time of their release reignited the debate about Heidegger's Nazism and its relationship to his philosophical project. Critics of this claim have countered it by pointing to the sketchbook character of the Black Notebooks and the intention of the author for them to remain private and unpublished ruminations on the cultural and philosophical ideas received via time and place. Others, such as Jesús Adrián Escudero, have cited an antisemitism that does not qualify as racial, social, interpersonal or political, but rather exists only in a certain use of received concepts and German philosophical commentary up to his time. Adam Knowles counters this narrative and documents Heidegger's deep philosophical commitment to völkisch antisemitism in the Black Notebooks.

In the Notebook Anmerkungen II (1946), Heidegger remarks:

"Prophecy" is the technique of defense against the skillful of history. It is an instrument of the will to power. That the great prophets are Jews is a fact, the secret of which has not yet been thought. (Note for donkey (Esel): the remark has nothing to do with "anti-Semitism". This is so foolish and so reprehensible, as the bloody and above all bloodless proceeding of the Christianity against "the heathens". The fact that the Christian also brands anti-Semitism as "unchristian belongs to the high education of the sophistication of its power technique)” GA 97:159.

== Published volumes ==
Heidegger, Martin (2014). Peter Trawny (ed.). Überlegungen II-VI (Schwarze Hefte 1931–1938). Heidegger Gesamtausgabe. Vol. Martin Heidegger Gesamtausgabe 94. Verlag Vittorio Klostermann. ISBN 978-3-465-03815-3.

Heidegger, Martin (2014). Peter Trawny (ed.). Überlegungen VII-XI (Schwarze Hefte 1938/39). Heidegger Gesamtausgabe. Vol. Martin Heidegger Gesamtausgabe 95. Verlag Vittorio Klostermann. ISBN 978-3-465-03833-7.

Heidegger, Martin (2014). Peter Trawny (ed.). Überlegungen XII-XV (Schwarze Hefte 1939–1941). Heidegger Gesamtausgabe. Vol. Martin Heidegger Gesamtausgabe 96. Verlag Vittorio Klostermann. ISBN 978-3-465-03839-9.

Heidegger, Martin (2015). Peter Trawny (ed.). Anmerkungen I-V (Schwarze Hefte 1942–1948). Heidegger Gesamtausgabe. Vol. Martin Heidegger Gesamtausgabe 97. Verlag Vittorio Klostermann. ISBN 978-3-465-03870-2.

Heidegger, Martin (2018). Peter Trawny (ed.). Anmerkungen VI–IX ("Schwarze Hefte" 1948/49–1951). Heidegger Gesamtausgabe. Vol. Martin Heidegger Gesamtausgabe 98. Verlag Vittorio Klostermann.

Heidegger, Martin (2019). Peter Trawny (ed.). Vier Hefte I und II ("Schwarze Hefte" 1947–1950). Heidegger Gesamtausgabe. Vol. Martin Heidegger Gesamtausgabe 99. Verlag Vittorio Klostermann.

Heidegger, Martin (2020). Peter Trawny (ed.). Vigiliae und Notturno ("Schwarze Hefte"1952/53 bis 1957). Heidegger Gesamtausgabe. Vol. Martin Heidegger Gesamtausgabe 100. Verlag Vittorio Klostermann. ISBN 978-3-465-01121-7.

Heidegger, Martin (2020). Peter Trawny (ed.). Winke I und II (Schwarze Hefte 1957–1959). Heidegger Gesamtausgabe. Vol. Martin Heidegger Gesamtausgabe 101. Verlag Vittorio Klostermann. ISBN 978-3-465-01734-9.

Heidegger, Martin (2021). Peter Trawny (ed.). Vorlaufiges I-IV: Schwarze Hefte 1963 -1970. Heidegger Gesamtausgabe. Vol. Martin Heidegger Gesamtausgabe 102. Verlag Vittorio Klostermann. ISBN 978-3465026877.
