= Vallega =

Vallega is a surname. Notable people with the surname include:

- Alejandro Vallega (born 1964), Chilean-born philosopher
- Daniela Vallega-Neu (born 1966), German philosopher
- Giovanni Battista Federico Vallega (1876–1944), Italian prelate
