= William McNeill (philosopher) =

American philosopher (born 1961)

William McNeill (born 1961) is an American philosopher who is Professor of Philosophy at DePaul University.

== Career and work ==
McNeill was educated at the University of Essex (PhD, 1987), and he is now teaching Heidegger at DePaul University. He is a translator of the work of Martin Heidegger, about whom he has written two books. The Glance of the Eye (1999) closely examines the relation between Heidegger's thought and Greek philosophy, in particular his relation to Aristotle. The Time of Life (2006) is an examination of the implications of Heidegger's thought for ethics.

== Bibliography ==
=== Books authored ===
- The Fate of Phenomenology: Heidegger's Legacy (London: Rowman & Littlefield, 2020).
- The Time of Life: Heidegger and Ethos (Albany: State University of New York Press, 2006).
- The Glance of the Eye: Heidegger, Aristotle, and the Ends of Theory (Albany: State University of New York Press, 1999).

=== Books edited ===
- Continental Philosophy: An Anthology (Oxford: Blackwell, 1998). Co-edited with Karen Feldman.

=== Selected articles ===
- "A Wave in the Stream of Chaos: Life Beyond the Body in Heidegger's Nietzsche," Philosophy Today 50 (2006): 156–61.
- "The Time of Contributions to Philosophy," in Charles E. Scott, Susan M. Schoenbohm, Daniela Vallega-Neu & Alejandro Vallega (eds.), Companion to Heidegger's Contributions to Philosophy (Bloomington & Indianapolis: Indiana University Press, 2001).
- "A 'scarcely pondered word.' The Place of Tragedy: Heidegger, Aristotle, Sophocles," in Miguel de Beistegui & Simon Sparks (eds.), Philosophy and Tragedy (Minneapolis & Oxford: University of Minnesota Press, 2000).
- "Care for the Self: Originary Ethics in Heidegger and Foucault," Philosophy Today 42 (1998): 53–64.
- "The First Principle of Hermeneutics," in Theodore Kisiel & John van Buren (eds.), Reading Heidegger from the Start: Essays in His Earliest Thought (Albany: State University of New York Press, 1994).
- "Spirit's Living Hand," in David Wood (ed.), Of Derrida, Heidegger, and Spirit (Evanston: Northwestern University Press, 1993).
- "Metaphysics, Fundamental Ontology, Metontology," Heidegger Studies 8 (1992): 63–79.
- "Porosity: Violence and the Question of Politics in Heidegger's Introduction to Metaphysics," Graduate Faculty Philosophy Journal 14, 2–15, 1 (1991): 183–212.

=== Heidegger translations ===
- Pathmarks (Cambridge: Cambridge University Press, 1998). Gesamtausgabe, vol. 9.
- Hölderlin's Hymn "The Ister" (Bloomington: Indiana University Press, 1996). With Julia Davis. Gesamtausgabe, vol. 53.
- The Fundamental Concepts of Metaphysics: World, Finitude, Solitude (Bloomington: Indiana University Press, 1995). With Nicholas Walker. Gesamtausgabe, vol. 29/30.
- The Concept of Time (Oxford: Blackwell, 1992). From Gesamtausgabe, vol. 64.

== See also ==
- American philosophy
- List of American philosophers
