= Research in Phenomenology =

- Discipline: Contemporary philosophy
- Language: English
- Edited by: John Sallis, Daniela Vallega-Neu

Publication details
- History: 1971–present
- Publisher: Brill Publishers
- Frequency: Triannually

Standard abbreviations
- ISO 4: Res. Phenomenol.

Indexing
- ISSN: 0085-5553
- JSTOR: resephen

Links
- Journal homepage

Research in Phenomenology is an international peer-reviewed journal for publishing contributions in phenomenology and contemporary continental philosophy. It is edited by John Sallis and James C. Risser.
