= James Risser =

James Risser may refer to:

- James C. Risser (born 1946), American philosopher and professor of philosophy at Seattle University
- James V. Risser (born 1938), American journalist and emeritus professor of communication at Stanford University
