= NTPA =

NTPA may refer to:

- North Texas Philosophical Association, an organization dedicated to the quality of philosophy teaching in North Texas
- National Tractor Pullers Association, the US tractor pulling governing body
