= North American Society for Philosophical Hermeneutics =

- Established: 2005
- Mission: The study of philosophical hermeneutics Hans-Georg Gadamer
- President: Carolyn Culbertson
- Key people: Lauren Swayne Barthold, James C. Risser, Theodore George, Alejandro Vallega, Cynthia Nielsen, Lawrence Schmidt, Carolyn Culbertson, Greg Lynch, David Vessey
- Website: nasph.org

The North American Society for Philosophical Hermeneutics (NASPH) is an organization whose purpose is to advance the study of philosophical hermeneutics. Although the society has a particular interest in the work of Hans-Georg Gadamer, it likewise encourages dialogue and engagement with a multitude of philosophical thinkers, traditions, and contemporary concerns. It was established in 2005.

Gadamer scholars Lauren Swayne Barthold (2005–2008), Lawrence Schmidt (2010–2019), James C. Risser (2012–2015), Theodore George (2013–2016), Alejandro Vallega (2017–2019),Georgia Warnke (2015–2018), Cynthia Nielsen (since 2016), Carolyn Culbertson (since 2017), Greg Lynch (since 2020), and David Vessey (since 2021) have served on the society's executive committee.

NASPH regularly has special sessions at the Society for Phenomenology and Existential Philosophy (SPEP).

NASPH is a recognized affiliated group of the American Philosophical Association and the Society for Phenomenology and Existential Philosophy.

== See also ==
- North American Kant Society
- North American Nietzsche Society
