= Heidegger Gesamtausgabe =

Collected writings of Martin Heidegger

Heidegger Gesamtausgabe (GA) is the title of the collected writings of German philosopher Martin Heidegger (1889–1976), published by Vittorio Klostermann.

== Etymology ==
Gesamtausgabe is the German word for 'complete edition', used in this case as 'collected works'.

== History ==
The Gesamtausgabe was begun during Martin Heidegger's lifetime. Publication commenced in the year 1975.

== Heidegger on the Gesamtausgabe ==
Martin Heidegger stipulated the order of publication. Shortly before his death, Heidegger wrote: "In this way, the complete edition is intended to guide people to take up the question, to ask questions and, above all, to ask more questioning questions". (Die Gesamtausgabe soll dadurch anleiten, die Frage aufzunehmen, mitzufragen und vor allem dann fragender zu fragen).

Heidegger had planned to write a lengthy introduction to his collected writings (Gesamtausgabe). He called his last project "Legacy of the Being Question (Vermächtnis der Seinsfrage)". This project is dated between 1973 and 1975, but it was not completed due to Heidegger's failing health near the end of his life. Three documents have been published as part of this project.

== Content ==
The Gesamtausgabe has 37,736 pages.

The editors had to work from Heidegger's often handwritten manuscripts, but they had leeway to include various student transcriptions in the published editions. They were given strict guidelines which are generally noted in the Editor's Afterwords (Nachwort des Herausgebers). It appears that the outline of the majority of the published writing were selected by Heidegger himself.

The Gesamtausgabe is divided into four series:

I. Published writings, 1910–1976
II. Lecture courses, 1919–1944
- Marburg lecture courses, 1923–1928
- Freiburg lecture courses, 1928–1944
- Early Freiburg lecture courses, 1919–1923
III. Unpublished material, lectures, and notes
IV. Notes and records

Each series is divided as follows:

=== I. Published Writings (Veröffentlichte Schriften) 1910–1976 ===
1. Frühe Schriften (1912–1916), ed. Friedrich-Wilhelm von Herrmann, 1978, 2nd ed 2018, XII, 454p.
2. Sein und Zeit (1927), ed. Friedrich-Wilhelm von Herrmann, 1977, XIV, 586p. Revised 2018.
3. Kant und das Problem der Metaphysik (1929), ed. Friedrich-Wilhelm von Herrmann, 1991, XVIII, 318p, 2nd ed 2010.
4. Erläuterungen zu Hölderlins Dichtung (1936–1968), ed. Friedrich-Wilhelm von Herrmann, 1981, 2nd ed. 1996, 3nd 2012, 208p.
5. Holzwege (1935–1946), ed. Friedrich-Wilhelm von Herrmann, 1977, 2nd ed. 2003, VIII, 382p.
- Der Ursprung des Kunstwerkes (1935/36)
- Die Zeit des Weltbildes (1938)
- Hegels Begriff der Erfahrung (1942/43)
- Nietzsches Wort »Gott ist tot« (1943)
- Wozu Dichter? (1946)
- Der Spruch des Anaximander (1946)
6.1. Nietzsche I (1936–1939), ed. Brigitte Schillbach, 1996, XII, 596p. [See also GA 43, 44, 48, 50,87].
6.2. Nietzsche II (1939–1946), ed. Brigitte Schillbach, 1997, VIII, 454p. [See also GA 43, 44, 48, 50,87].
7. Vorträge und Aufsätze (1936–1953), ed. Friedrich-Wilhelm von Herrmann, 2000, XVIII, 298p.
- Die Frage nach der Technik (1953)
- Wissenschaft und Besinnung (1953)
- Überwindung der Metaphysik (1936–1946)
- Wer ist Nietzsches Zarathustra? (1953)
- Was heißt Denken? (1952)
- Bauen Wohnen Denken (1951)
- Das Ding (1950)
- »...dichterisch wohnet der Mensch...« (1951)
- Logos (Heraklit, Fragment 50) (1951)
- Moira (Parmenides, Fragment VIII, 34–41) (1952)
- Aletheia (Heraklit, Fragment 16) (1954)
8. Was heisst Denken? (1951–1952), ed. Paola-Ludovika Coriando, 2002, VIII, 272p.
9. Wegmarken (1919–1961), ed. Friedrich-Wilhelm von Herrmann, 1976, 2nd ed. 1996, 3rd ed. 2004, X, 488p.
- Anmerkungen zu Karl Jaspers »Psychologie der Weltanschauungen« (1919/21)
- Phänomenologie und Theologie (1927)
- Aus der letzten Marburger Vorlesung (1927)
- Was ist Metaphysik? (1929)
- Vom Wesen des Grundes (1929)
- Vom Wesen der Wahrheit (1930)
- Platons Lehre von der Wahrheit (1931/32, 1940)
- Vom Wesen und Begriff der Φὐσις. Aristoteles, Physik B, 1 (1939)
- Nachwort zu »Was ist Metaphysik?« (1943)
- Brief über den Humanismus (1946)
- Einleitung zu »Was ist Metaphysik?« (1949)
- Zur Seinsfrage (1955)
- Hegel und die Griechen (1958)
- Kants These über das Sein (1961)
10. Der Satz vom Grund (1955–1956), ed. Petra Jaeger, 1997, VIII, 192p.
11. Identität und Differenz (1955–1957), ed. Friedrich-Wilhelm von Herrmann, 2nd ed. 2006, VI, 168p.
- Was ist das – die Philosophie? (1955)
- Identität und Differenz (1957)
- Der Satz der Identität (1957)
- Die ontotheologische Verfassung der Metaphysik (1957)
- Die Kehre (1949)
- Grundsätze des Denkens (1957) [only the first of several; see Volume 79 for the full set]
- Ein Vorwort. Brief an Pater William J. Richardson (1962)
- Brief an Takehiko Kojima (1963)
12 Unterwegs zur Sprache (1950–1959), ed. Friedrich-Wilhelm von Herrmann, 1985, 2nd ed 2018, 262p.
- Die Sprache (1950)
- Die Sprache im Gedicht. Eine Erörterung von Georg Trakls Gedicht (1952)
- Aus einem Gespräch von der Sprache. (1953/54) Zwischen einem Japaner und einem Fragenden
- Das Wesen der Sprache (1957/58)
- Das Wort (1958)
- Der Weg zur Sprache (1959)
13 Aus der Erfahrung des Denkens (1910–1976), ed. Hermann Heidegger, 1983, 2nd ed. 2002, VIII, 254p.
- Abraham a Sankta Clara (1910)
- Frühe Gedichte (1910–1916)
- Schöpferische Landschaft: Warum bleiben wir in der Provinz? (1933)
- Wege zur Aussprache (1937)
- Winke (1941)
- Chorlied aus der Antigone des Sophokles (1943)
- Zur Erörterung der Gelassenheit. Aus einem Feldweggespräch über das Denken (1944/45)
- Aus der Erfahrung des Denkens (1947)
- Der Feldweg (1949)
- Holzwege ("Dem künftigen Menschen…") (1949)
- Zu einem Vers von Mörike. Ein Briefwechsel mit Martin Heidegger von Emil Staiger (1951)
- Was heisst Lesen? (1954)
- Vom Geheimnis des Glockenturmes (1954)
- Für das Langenharder Hebelbuch (1954)
- Über die Sixtina (1955)
- Die Sprache Johann Peter Hebels (1955)
- Begegnungen mit Ortega y Gasset (1955)
- Was ist die Zeit? (1956)
- Hebel der Hausfreund (1957)
- Aufzeichnungen aus der Werkstatt (1959)
- Sprache und Heimat (1960)
- Über Igor Strawinsky (1962)
- Für René Char (1963)
- Adalbert Stifters "Eisgeschichte" (1964)
- Wink in das Gewesen (1966)
- Die Kunst und der Raum (1969)
- Zeichen (1969)
- Das Wohnen des Menschen (1970)
- Gedachtes (1970)
- Rimbaud vivant (1972)
- Sprache (1972)
- Der Fehl heiliger Namen (1974)
- Fridolin Wiplingers letzter Besuch (1974)
- Erhart Kästner zum Gedächtnis (1975)
- Grusswort für Bernhard Welte (1976)
14 Zur Sache des Denkens (1962–1964), ed. Friedrich-Wilhelm von Herrmann, 2007, VI, 156p.
- Zeit und Sein (1962)
- Protocol" of the seminar on the lecture Zeit und Sein (1962).
- Das Ende der Philosophie und die Aufgabe des Denkens (1964)
- Mein Weg in die Phänomenologie (1963).
- Notes on Second Section. The newly included Second Part includes seven texts from the period between 1927 and 1968: a self-announcement of Being and Time, two textual witnesses from Heidegger's collaboration with Edmund Husserl, three texts (an announcement and two prefaces) to What is Metaphysics? and the text "On the Understanding of Time in Phenomenology and in Thinking the Question of Being".
15 Seminare (1951–1973), ed. Curd Ochwadt, 1986, 2nd ed. 2005, 448p.
- Martin Heidegger – Eugen Fink: HERAKLIT (Wintersemester 1966-1967)
- Vier Seminare: Seminar in Le Thor 1966, 1968, 1969; Seminar in Zähringen 1973
- Zürich Seminar (6. November 1951) given at Auditorium Maximum der Eidgenössischen Technischen Hochschule.
16 Reden und andere Zeugnisse eines Lebensweges (1910–1976), ed. Hermann Heidegger, 2000, XXII, 842p.

=== II. Lectures (Vorlesungen) 1919–1944 ===
==== While at Marburger 1923–1928 ====
17. Einführung in die phänomenologische Forschung (Winter semester 1923/24), ed. Friedrich-Wilhelm von Herrmann, 1994, 2nd ed. 2006, XIV, 332p.
18. Grundbegriffe der aristotelischen Philosophie (Summer semester 1924), ed. Mark Michalski, 2002, XIV, 418p.
19. Platon: Sophistes (Winter semester 1924/25), ed. Ingeborg Schüssler, 1992, XXXII, 668p.
20. Prolegomena zur Geschichte des Zeitbegriffs (Summer semester 1925), ed. Petra Jaeger, 1979, 2nd ed. 1988, 3rd ed. 1994, XII, 448p.
21. Logik. Die Frage nach der Wahrheit (Winter semester 1925/26), ed. Walter Biemel, 1976, 2nd ed. 1995, VIII, 418p.
22. Grundbegriffe der antiken Philosophie (Summer semester 1926) ed. Franz-Karl Blust, 1993, 2nd ed. 2004, XIV, 344p.
23. Geschichte der Philosophie von Thomas von Aquin bis Kant (Winter semester 1926/27), ed. Helmuth Vetter, 2006. XII, 248p.
24. Die Grundprobleme der Phänomenologie (Summer semester 1927), ed. Friedrich-Wilhelm von Herrmann, 1975, 2nd ed. 1989, 3rd ed. 1997, X, 474p.
25. Phänomenologische Interpretation von Kants Kritik der reinen Vernunft (Winter semester 1927/28), ed. Ingtraud Görland, 1977, 2nd ed. 1987, 3rd ed. 1995, XII, 436p.
26. Metaphysische Anfangsgründe der Logik im Ausgang von Leibniz (Summer semester 1928), ed. Klaus Held, 1978, 2nd ed. 1990, VI, 292p.

==== While at Freiburger 1928–1944 ====
27. Einleitung in die Philosophie (Winter semester 1928/29), ed. Otto Saame and Ina Saame-Speidel, 1996, 2nd ed. 2001, XII, 404p.
28. Der deutsche Idealismus (Fichte, Schelling, Hegel) und die philosophische Problemlage der Gegenwart (Summer semester 1929) Im Anhang: Nachschrift "Einführung in das akademische Studium" (Summer semester 1929), ed. Claudius Strube, 1997, XII, 368p.
29/30. Die Grundbegriffe der Metaphysik. Welt – Endlichkeit – Einsamkeit (Winter semester 1929/30), ed. Friedrich-Wilhelm von Herrmann, 1983, 2nd ed. 1992, 3rd ed. 2004, XX, 544p.
31. Vom Wesen der menschlichen Freiheit. Einleitung in die Philosophie (Summer semester 1930), ed. Hartmut Tietjen, 1982, 2nd ed. 1994, XII, 308p.
32. Hegels Phänomenologie des Geistes (Winter semester 1930/31), ed. Ingtraud Görland, 1980, 2nd ed. 1988, 3rd ed. 1997, VIII, 224p.
33. Aristoteles, Metaphysik Θ, 1–3. Von Wesen und Wirklichkeit der Kraft (Summer semester 1931), ed. Heinrich Hüni, 1981, 2nd ed. 1990, 3rd ed. 2006, VIII, 228p.
34. Vom Wesen der Wahrheit. Zu Platons Höhlengleichnis und Theätet (Winter semester 1931/32), ed. Hermann Mörchen, 1988, 2nd ed. 1997, X, 338p.
35. Der Anfang der abendländischen Philosophie (Anaximander und Parmenides) (Summer semester 1932), ed. Peter Trawny, 2012, XII, 272p.
36/37. Sein und Wahrheit 1. Die Grundfrage der Philosophie (Summer semester 1933), 2. Vom Wesen der Wahrheit (Winter semester 1933/34), ed. Hartmut Tietjen, 2001, XVI, 306p.
38. Logik als die Frage nach dem Wesen der Sprache (Summer semester 1934), ed. Günter Seubold, 1998, VIII, 176p.
38 A. Logik als die Frage nach dem Wesen der Sprache (Summer semester 1934), ed. Peter Trawny, 2020, X, 190p. Uses newly found original manuscripts.
39. Hölderlins Hymnen "Germanien" und "Der Rhein" (Winter semester 1934/35), ed. Susanne Ziegler, 1980, 2nd ed. 1989, 3rd ed. 1999, 4th ed 2022, XII, 296p.
40. Einführung in die Metaphysik (Summer semester 1935), ed. Petra Jaeger, 1983, 2nd ed 2020, X, 234p.
41. Die Frage nach dem Ding. Zu Kants Lehre von den transzendentalen Grundsätzen (Winter semester 1935/36), ed. Petra Jaeger, 1984, VIII, 254p.
42. Schelling: Vom Wesen der menschlichen Freiheit (1809) (Summer semester 1936), ed. Ingrid Schüssler, 1988, X, 290p.
43. Nietzsche: Der Wille zur Macht als Kunst (Winter semester 1936/37), ed. Bernd Heimbüchel, 1985, 2nd ed 2022, XII, 298p.
44. Nietzsches metaphysische Grundstellung im abendländischen Denken. Die ewige Wiederkehr des Gleichen (Summer semester 1937), ed. Marion Heinz, 1986, VIII, 254p.
45. Grundfragen der Philosophie. Ausgewählte "Probleme" der "Logik" (Winter semester 1937/38), ed. Friedrich-Wilhelm von Herrmann, 1984, 2nd ed. 1992, XIV, 234p.
46. Zur Auslegung von Nietzsches II. Unzeitgemässer Betrachtung (Winter semester 1938/39), ed. Bernd Friedrich, 2003, XII, 382p.
47. Nietzsches Lehre vom Willen zur Macht als Erkenntnis (Summer semester 1939), ed. Eberhard Hanser, 1989, XVI, 330p.
48. Nietzsche: Der europäische Nihilismus (II second trimester 1940), ed. Petra Jaeger, 1986, XVI, 340p.
49. Die Metaphysik des deutschen Idealismus. Zur erneuten Auslegung von Schelling: Philosophische Untersuchungen über das Wesen der menschlichen Freiheit und die damit zusammenhängenden Gegenstände (1809) (I. Trimester 1941/Summer semester 1941), ed. Günther Seubold, 1991, 2nd ed. 2006, X, 210p.
50. Nietzsches Metaphysik (announced for the winter semester 1941/42) Einleitung in die Philosophie – Denken und Dichten (Winter semester 1944/45), ed. Petra Jaeger, 1990, 2nd ed., 2007, VIII, 162p.
51. Grundbegriffe (Summer semester 1941), ed. Petra Jaeger, 1981, 2nd ed. 1991, X, 128p.
52. Hölderlins Hymne "Andenken" (Winter semester 1941/42), ed. Curd Ochwaldt, 1982, 2nd ed. 1992, X, 204p.
53. Hölderlins Hymne "Der Ister" (Summer semester 1942), ed. Walter Biemel, 1984, 2nd ed. 1993, VIII, 210p.
54. Parmenides (Winter semester 1942/43), ed. Manfred S. Frings, 1982, 2nd ed. 1992, 3rd ed 2018, XII, 252p.
55. Heraklit. ed. Manfred S. Frings, 1979, 2nd ed. 1987, 3rd ed. 1994, XII, 406p. Der Anfang des abendländischen Denkens (Summer semester 1943). 2. Logik. Heraklits Lehre vom Logos (Summer semester 1944),

==== While at Freiburger 1919–1923 ====
56/57. Zur Bestimmung der Philosophie. 1. Die Idee der Philosophie und das Weltanschauungsproblem (Kriegsnotsemester 1919). 2. Phänomenologie und transzendentale Wertphilosophie (Summer semester 1919). 3. Anhang: Über das Wesen der Universität und des akademischen Studiums (Summer semester 1919). Ed. Bernd Heimbüchel, 1987, 2nd ed. 1999, X, 226p.
58. Grundprobleme der Phänomenologie (Winter semester 1919/20), ed. Hans-Helmuth Gander, 1992, 2nd ed 2010, X, 274p.
59. Phänomenologie der Anschauung und des Ausdrucks. Theorie der philosophischen Begriffsbildung (Summer semester 1920), ed. Claudius Strube, 1993, 2nd ed 2007, VIII, 202p.
60. Phänomenologie des religiösen Lebens. 1. Einleitung in die Phänomenologie der Religion (Winter semester 1920/21), ed. Matthias Jung und Thomas Regehly. 2. Augustinus und der Neuplatonismus (Summer semester 1921), ed Claudius Strube. 3. Die philosophischen Grundlagen der mittelalterlichen Mystik (Prepared notes and introduction to an undelivered course 1918/19), ed. Claudius Strube, 1995, 2nd 2011, XIV, 352p.
61. Phänomenologische Interpretationen zu Aristoteles. Einführung in die phänomenologische Forschung (Winter semester 1921/22), ed. Walter Bröcker and Käte Bröcker-Oltmanns, 1985, 2nd ed. 1994, XIV, 204p.
62. Phänomenologische Interpretationen ausgewählter Abhandlungen des Aristoteles zu Ontologie und Logik (Summer semester 1922), ed. Günther Neumann, 2005, XXIV, 452p.
63. Ontologie. Hermeneutik der Faktizität (Summer semester 1923), ed. Käte Bröcker-Oltmanns, 1988, 2nd ed. 1995, 3rd ed 2018, XII, 116p.

=== III. Unpublished Essays, Lectures and Thoughts (Unveröffentlichte Abhandlungen / Vorträge – Gedachtes) ===
64. Der Begriff der Zeit (1924), ed. Friedrich-Wilhelm von Herrmann, 2004, VI, 134p.
- I. Die Fragestellung Diltheys und Yorcks Grundtendenz
- II. Die ursprünglichen Seinscharaktere des Daseins
- III. Dasein und Zeitlichkeit
- IV. Zeitlichkeit und Geschichtlichkeit
- Anhang: Der Begriff der Zeit. Vortrag vor der Marburger Theologenschaft Juli 1924
65. Beiträge zur Philosophie (Vom Ereignis) (1936–1938), ed. Friedrich-Wilhelm von Herrmann, 1989, 2nd ed. 1994, 3rd 2003, XVI, 522p.
- I. Vorblick
- II. Der Anklang
- III. Das Zuspiel
- IV. Der Sprung
- V. Die Gründung, a) Da-Sein und Seinsentwurf, b) Das Da-sein, c) Das Wesen der Wahrheit, d) Der Zeit-Raum als der Ab-grund, e) Die Wesung der Wahrheit als Bergung
- VI. Die Zu-künftigen
- VII. Der letzte Gott
- VIII. Das Seyn
66. Besinnung (1938/39), ed. Friedrich-Wilhelm von Herrmann, 1997, XIV, 438p.
- I. Einleitung
- II. Der Vorsprung in die Einzigkeit des Seyns
- III. Die Philosophie
- IV. Zum Entwurf des Seyns
- V. Wahrheit und Wissen
- VI. Das Seyn
- VII. Das Seyn und der Mensch
- VIII. Das Seyn und der Mensch
- IX. Der Anthropomorphismus
- X. Geschichte
- XI. Die Technik
- XII. Historie und Technik
- XIII. Seyn und Macht
- XIV. Das Seyn und das Sein
- XV. Das Denken des Seyns
- XVI. Die Seynsvergessenheit
- XVII. Die Seynsgeschichte
- XVIII. Götter
- XIX. Die Irre
- XX. Zur Geschichte der Metaphysik
- XXI. Die metaphysische Warumfrage
- XXII. Seyn und "Werden"
- XXIII. Das Sein als Wirklichkeit
- XXIV. Das Seyn und die "Negativität"
- XXV. Sein und Denken. Sein und Zeit
- XXVI. Eine Sammlung des Besinnens
- XXVII. Das seynsgeschichtliche Denken und die Seinsfrage
- XXVIII. Der seynsgeschichtliche Begriff der Metaphysik
- Rückblick auf den Weg (1937-1938). Mein bisheriger Weg. Beilage zu Wunsch und Wille (Über die Bewahrung des Versuchten).
67. Metaphysik und Nihilismus, ed. Hans-Joachim Friedrich, 1999, 2nd ed 2018, XII, 274p.
- 1. Die Überwindung der Metaphysik (1938/39)
- 2. Das Wesen des Nihilismus (1946–1948)
68. Hegel, ed. Ingrid Schüssler, 1993, 2nd ed 2009, X, 154p.
- 1. Die Negativität (1938/39, 1941)
- 2. Erläuterung der "Einleitung" zu Hegels "Phänomenologie des Geistes" (1942)
69. Die Geschichte des Seyns, ed. Peter Trawny, 1998, XII, 230p. Second edition 2012, 3rd ed 2022, XII, 230p.
- 1. Die Geschichte des Seyns (1938/40)
- 2. Κοινόν Aus der Geschichte des Seyns (1939)
70. Über den Anfang, (1941). ed. Paola-Ludovika Coriando, 2005, XII, 200p.
- I. Die Anfängnis des Anfangs
- II. Anfang und das anfängliche Denken
- III. Ereignis und Da-sein
- IV. Bemerkungen über das Auslegen
- V. Die Seynsgeschichte
- VI. Sein und Zeit und das anfängliche Denken als Geschichte des Seyns
71. Das Ereignis, (1941-1942). ed. Friedrich-Wilhelm von Herrmann, 2009. XXII, 348p.
- Vorworte
- Der erste Anfang
- Der Anklang
- Der Unterschied
- Die Verwindung
- Das Ereignis. Der Wortschatz seines Wesens
- Das Ereignis
- Das Ereignis und das Menschenwesen
- Das Daseyn
- Der andere Anfang
- Weisungen in das Ereignis
- Das seynsgeschichtliche Denken (Dichten und Denken)
72. Die Stege des Anfangs (1944). Editor Mark Michalski. Forthcoming after 2023.
73. Zum Ereignis-Denken, ed. Peter Trawny, 2013, XCVIII, 1496p. Published in two volumes, GA 73.1 and GA 73.2. Six major sections. Zu Ereignis I. Zerklüftung und ἀλήθεια Zerklüftung des Seins. Zu Ereignis II. Die Seinsfrage und das Ereignis. Zu Ereignis III. Das Da-sein. Zu Ereignis IV. Wesen des Entwurfs – Vorgehen. Zu Ereignis V. Abschied. Eine Reihe von Manuskripten zum Ereignis (1943-1945) Zu Ereignis VI. Ontologische Differenz und Unterschied.
74. Zum Wesen der Sprache und Zur Frage nach der Kunst, ed. Thomas Regehly, 2010. XIV, 214p.
75. Zu Hölderlin / Griechenlandreisen, ed. Curt Ochwadt, 2000, VI, 408p.
76. Leitgedanken zur Entstehung der Metaphysik, der neuzeitlichen Wissenschaft und der modernen Technik, ed. Claudius Strube, 2009. VIII, 408p.
77. Feldweg-Gespräche (1944/45), ed. Ingrid Schüssler, 1995, 2nd. ed. 2007, VI, 250p.
- 1. Ἀγχιβασίη. Ein Gespräch selbdritt auf einem Feldweg zwischen einem Forscher, einem Gelehrten und einem Weisen
- 2. Der Lehrer trifft den Türmer an der Tür zum Turmaufgang
- 3. Abendgespräch in einem Kriegsgefangenenlager in Russland zwischen einem Jüngeren und einem Älteren
78. Der Spruch des Anaximander (Summer, Fall 1942. Not delivered), ed. Ingrid Schüssler, 2010, XXII, 352p.
79. Bremer und Freiburger Vorträge, ed. Petra Jaeger, 1994, 2nd ed. 2005, VI, 182p.
- 1. Einblick in das was ist. Bremer Vorträge 1949: Das Ding / Das Ge-stell / Die Gefahr / Die Kehre
- 2. Grundsätze des Denkens. Freiburger Vorträge 1957 [full set of lectures, only the first of which is found in Volume 11]
80. Vorträge, ed. Günther Neumann. Note these lectures published in two volumes (GA 80.1 and GA 80.2). [Titles listed are from the table of contents].
- 80.1 Vorträge. First volume. Teil 1: 1915 bis 1932. Published 2016. VI, 562, pages.
- Frage und Urteil (Vortrag im Rickert Seminar 10. Juli 1915)
- Uber Psychologie (April 1920)
- Wahrsein und Dasein. Aristoteles, Ethica Nicomachea Z (Vortrag in der Kant-Gesellschaft Köln WS 1923/24)
- Kasseler Vorträge (1925). Wilhelm Diltheys Forschungsarbeit und der gegenwartige Kampf um eine historische Weltanschauung 16.–21. April 1925)
- Begriff und Entwicklung der phänomenologischen Forschung (Vortrag im Marburger kulturwissenschaftlichen Kränzchen 4. Dezember 1926)
- Phänomenologie und Theologie. 1. Teil: Die nichtphilosophischen als positive Wissenschaften und die Philosophie als transzendentale Wissenschaft (Vortrag vor der evangelischen Theologenschaft in Tübingen 8. Juli 1927)
- Die heutige Problemlage der Philosophie (Vortrag in der Kantgesellschaft Karlsruhe 4. Dezember 1929 und vor der wissenschaftlichen Vereinigung zu Amsterdam 21. März 1930).
- Philosophische Anthropologie und Metaphysik des Daseins (Vortrag in der Kantgesellschaft Frankfurt 24. Januar 1929)
- Hegel und das Problem der Metaphysik (Vortrag in der wissenschaftlichen Vereinigung zu Arnsterdam 22. März 1930)
- Vom Wesen der Wahrheit (There are 4 versions) First given 14 Juli 1930 Karlsruhe, Vortrag am 8. Oktober 1930 in Bremen, 5. Dezember 1930 in Marburg, 11. Dezember 1930 in Freiburg.
- Augustinus: Quid est tempus? Confessiones lib. XI (Vortrag in Beuron 26. Oktober 1930)
- Hohlengleichnis – Vorarbeit (um 1931)
- Ἀλήθεια und Hohlengleichnis (13. November 1931)
- τὸ ψεῦδος (Vortrag im Freiburger Kränzchen 22. Juli 1932)
- "Der Satz vom Widerspruch" (Vortrag im Freiburger Kränzchen 16. Dezember 1932
- 80.2 Vorträge. Second volume. Teil 2: 1935 bis 1967. ed. Günther Neumann. Published 2020. VIII, 850, pages.
- Vom Ursprung des Kunstwerks (13 November 1935)
- Das Dasein und der Einzelne (Vortrag Zürich 18. Januar 1936)
- Europa und die deutsche Philosophie (Vortrag im Kaiser Wilhelm-Institut Bibliotheca Hertziana Rom 8. April 1936)
- Die Begründung des neuzeitlichen Weltbildes durch die Metaphysik (9 Juni 1938).
- Von der Grundbestimmung des Wissens (Vortrag im Freiburger Kränzchen 9. Juni 1939)
- Der Spruch des Parmenides (Vortrag im Freiburger Kränzchen Juni 1940)
- Platons Lehre von der Wahrheit. Eine Auslegung des Höhlengleichnisses (Politeia VII) (29. April 1941)
- Zur Geschichte des Existenzbegriffs (Vortrag im Freiburger Kränzchen 7. Juni 1941)
- Über Nietzsches Wort »Gott ist todt« (6. Juni 1943)
- Von der Vergessenheit (1944/45)
- Über das Ding (Mai 1950)
- Die Sprache (7. Oktober 1950 auf Bühlerhöhe und 4. Februar 1951 in Stuttgart)
- Zur heutigen Dichtung (10. März 1951)
- Λόγος. Das Leitwort Heraklits (4. Mai 1951)
- Bauen Wohnen Denken. Erste Fassung (5. August 1951)
- Die Frage nach der Technik. Entwurf (vor dem 18. November 1953)
- Hegel und die Griechen (20. März 1958
- Über die Be-Stimmung der Künste im gegenwärtigen Weltalter (Vortrag in Baden-Baden Haus Schweizer 7. und 8. Mai 1959)
- Max Kommerell (Vortrag in der Gedächtnisfeier von Max Kommerell 27. Februar 1962)
- Überlieferte Sprache und technische Sprache (Vortrag auf dem Lehrgang für Gewerbeschullehrer auf der Comburg 18. Juli 1962)
- Die Bestimmung (Zur Frage nach der Bestimmung) der Sache des Denkens (24 Juli 1964, 30 Oktober 1965; 19 Juli 1967 Kiel zu W. Bröckers 65. Geburtstag)
- Bemerkungen zu Kunst – Plastik – Raum (Vortrag St. Gallen 3. Oktober 1964)
- Dankeswort für Dr. Müller-Skjold (Anfang Mai 1966)
- Die Herkunft der Kunst und die Bestimmung des Denkens (Vortrag in der Akademie der Wissenschaften und Künste in Athen 4. April 1967).
81. Gedachtes, ed. Paola-Ludovika Coriando, 2007, XX, 360p.
- I. Frühe unveröffentlichte Gedichte. Ich mied der Gottesnähe heldenschaffende Kraft / Fernes Land / Hast die Sonne du verloren
- II. Aus der Erfahrung des Denkens. Auf dem Heimweg / Der Ring des Seyns / Wende / Dann sind wir bedacht / Amo: volo ut sis / Sonata sonans / Ankunft / Winke / An-fang und Beginn im Ereignis "der" Freyheit / Aus der Werkstatt / Hütte am Abend / Pindari Isthmia V, 1–16 / Herákleitos ho skyteinós. Dem Freunde zu Weihnachten 1946 / Furchen
- III. Gedachtes für das Vermächtnis eines Denkens. Lerchensporn / Wage den Schritt /…durchrasend die Irrnis / Seynsfuge / Tod / Nichtendes Nichts / Gegnet noch Gegend / Die Nähe des letzten Gottes / Der Schritt zurück /Vermächtnis der Seynsfrage

=== IV. Notes and Records (Hinweise und Aufzeichnungen) ===
(The publisher Vittorio Klostermann points out that one notebook is missing from the early 1930s: the Nachlass: "Überlegungen I" or "Winke Überlegungen (I)" is still missing (GA 97 p. 521 editor note).

82. Zu eigenen Veröffentlichungen, ed. Friedrich-Wilhelm von Herrmann, 2018. XXVIII, 594p.
Anmerkungen zu »Vom Wesen des Grundes« 1936. Eine Auseinandersetzung mit »Sein und Zeit« 1936. Laufende Anmerkungen zu »Sein und Zeit« 1936.
83. Seminare: Platon – Aristoteles – Augustinus, ed. Mark Michalski, 2012, XXVI, 682p.
84.1 Seminare: Leibniz – Kant – Schiller, ed. Günther Neumann, 2013, XXXVIII, 894p. [note Lectures on Schiller 1936-1937 Winter Semester are not included in 84.1].
84.2 Seminare: Leibniz – Kant – Schiller. ed. Günther Neumann, 2023, XXX, 934 pages.
85. Seminar: Vom Wesen der Sprache. (Summer semester 1939). Die Metaphysik der Sprache und die Wesung des Wortes. Zu Herders Abhandlung "Über den Ursprung der Sprache", ed. Ingrid Schüssler, 1999, XII, 220p.
86. Seminare: Hegel – Schelling, ed. Peter Trawny, 2011, XLII, 906p.
87. Seminare: Nietzsche: Seminare 1937 und 1944. 1. Nietzsches metaphysische Grundstellung (Sein und Schein). 2. Skizzen zu Grundbegriffe des Denkens. ed. Peter von Ruckteschell, 2004, XX, 324p.
88. Seminare (Übungen) 1937/38 und 1941/42. ed. Alfred Denker, 2008, XIV, 336p. 1. Die metaphysischen Grundstellungen des abendländischen Denkens 2. Einübung in das philosophische Denken.
89. Zollikoner Seminare, ed. Peter. Trawny, 2017, XXXII, 880p.
90. Zu Ernst Jünger, ed. Peter Trawny, 2004, XVI, 472p.
91. Ergänzungen und Denksplitter, ed. Mark Michalski. 2022, XXXVI, 774p. ISBN 978-3465027379.
92. Ausgewählte Briefe I. ed. Mark Michalski. Forthcoming.
93. Ausgewählte Briefe II. ed. Mark Michalski. Forthcoming.
94. Überlegungen II-VI (Schwarze Hefte 1931–1938), ed. Peter Trawny, 2014, VI, 536p.
95. Überlegungen VII-XI (Schwarze Hefte 1938-39), ed. Peter Trawny, 2014, 2nd edition 2022, VI, 456p.
96. Überlegungen XII-XV (Schwarze Hefte 1939–1941), ed. Peter Trawny, 2014, VI, 286p.
97. Anmerkungen I-V (Schwarze Hefte 1942–1948), ed. Peter Trawny, 2015, VI, 528p.
98. Anmerkungen VI-IX (Schwarze Hefte 1948/49-1951), ed. Peter Trawny, 2018, VI, 422p.
99. Vier Hefte I: Der Feldweg / Vier Hefte II: Durch Ereignis zu Ding und Welt, (1947–1950), ed. Peter Trawny, 2019, VI, 190p.
100. Vigiliae I, II / Notturno, (1952/53 bis 1957), ed. Peter Trawny, 2020, VI, 304p.
101. Winke I, II. (Schwarze Hefte 1957–1959), ed. Peter Trawny, 2020, VI, 220p.
102. Vorläufiges I-IV. (Schwarze Hefte 1963-1970), ed. Peter Trawny, 2022, VI, 441p. ISBN 978-3465026907.

Note: The last nine volumes (GA 94–102) are the Schwarze Hefte (Black Notebooks). There are 34 (one missing) notebooks in this group and about 3,384 pages.

103. Raum und Zeit – Stimmung und Grundstimmung – Über Marx, ed. Peter Trawny, 2025. XXIV, 312p.
104. Gespräche – "Eigentum". Der Weg zur Sprache – Vier Hefte ed. Peter Trawny, 2025. XVI, 282p.
105. Vermächtnis der Seinsfrage ed. Peter Trawny, 2025. XXVIII, 426p.

== Criticism of the Gesamtausgabe ==
- Theodore Kisiel, "Heidegger's Gesamtausgabe: An International Scandal of Scholarship", Philosophy Today 39 (1995), pp. 3–15.

== Indexes ==
Free Indexes for some of Martin Heidegger's collections and titles:

Index of all of the GA titles in alphabetical order in German from Klostermann is online here.

- Ferrer, D.F. (2022). Heidegger: Bibliography of addresses and courses he took and taught: German and English. https://archive.org/details/heidegger-bibliography-2022
- Ferrer, D.F. (2021). Heidegger's Middle Period (German and English): an Index. https://archive.org/details/mh-middle-index
- Ferrer, D. F (2018). Heidegger Zum Ereignis-Denken (GA73): An Index. https://archive.org/details/HeideggerGA73BookIndex
- Ferrer, D. F. (2016). Heidegger Schwarze Hefte (1931–1948): An Index https://archive.org/details/HeideggerSchwarzeBlackNotebooksIndex
- Ferrer, D. F. (2016). Martin Heidegger Esoteric Writings: An Index https://archive.org/details/HeideggerEsotericIndex
- Ferrer, D.F (2017). Heidegger Anmerkungen I-V (Schwarze Hefte 1942–1948): An Index https://archive.org/details/HeideggerGA97Index
- Ferrer, D.F. (2016). Heidegger Überlegungen XII-XV (GA96): An Index. https://archive.org/details/HeideggerGA96Index
- Ferrer, D.F. (2016). Martin Heidegger on the Greeks: An Index. https://archive.org/details/HeideggerGreeksIndex
- Ferrer, D. F. (2016). Martin Heidegger 1910–1932: An Index. https://archive.org/details/MartinHeidegger19101932Index1
- Ferrer, D.F., & Sharma, Ritu (2016). Heidegger Being and Time, Sein und Zeit (1927): An Index https://archive.org/details/SeinZeitBeingTimeIndex
