= Philipp Rosemann =

German philosopher

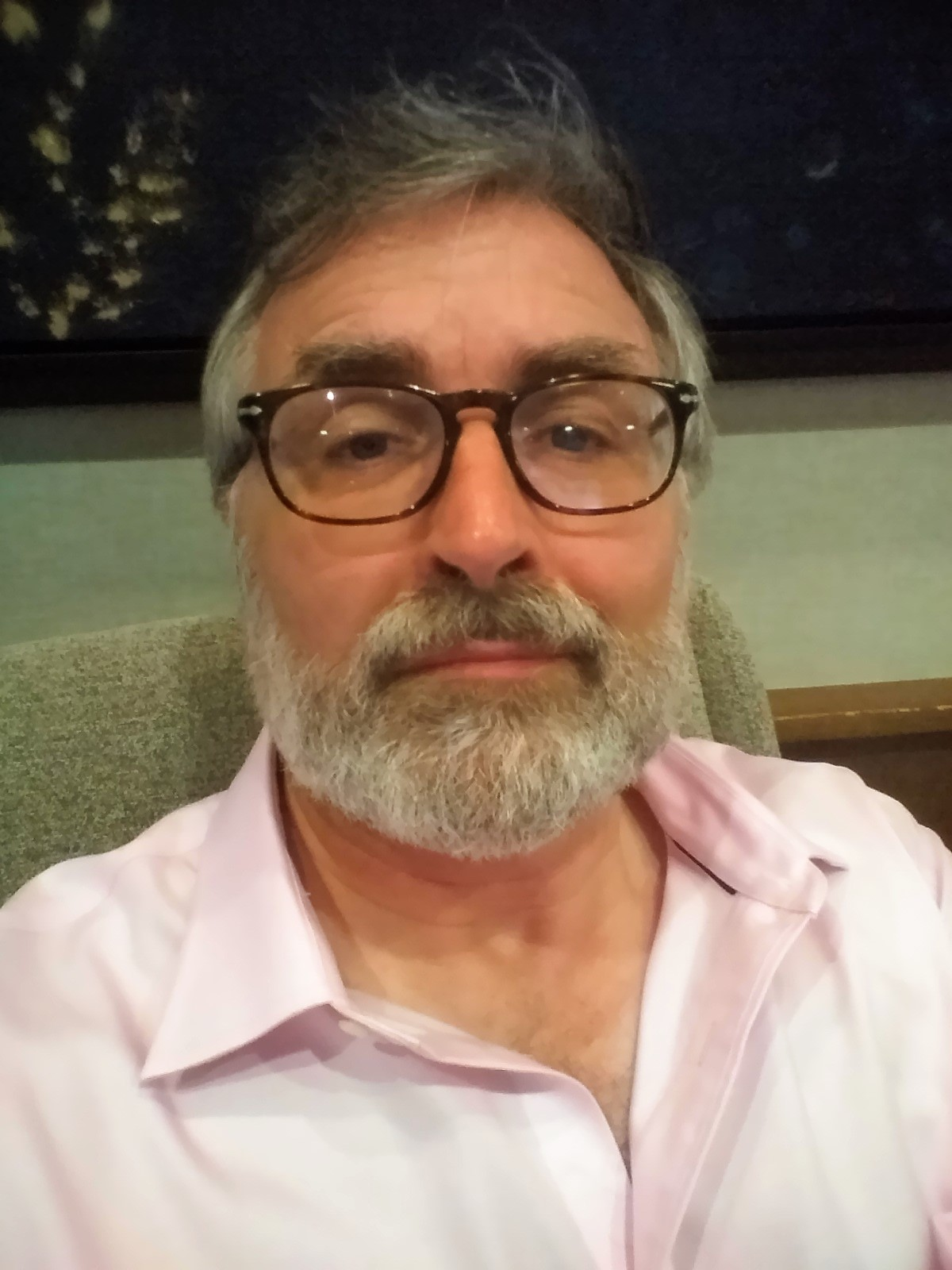
- Born: Philipp W. Rosemann; February 24, 1964 (age 62); Frankfurt am Main, West Germany

Education
- Education: Queen's University Belfast (M.A.); Université catholique de Louvain (Ph.D.)
- Doctoral advisor: James McEvoy

Philosophical work
- Era: Contemporary philosophy
- Region: Western philosophy
- School: Continental philosophy
- Institutions: University of Kentucky
- Doctoral students: Cynthia Nielsen, Jeffrey Bishop
- Main interests: Medieval philosophy, philosophy of religion, metaphysics

Philipp Wolfram Rosemann (born February 24, 1964, in Frankfurt) is a German philosopher and Cottrill-Rolfes Chair at University of Kentucky. Previously he was Professor of Philosophy at Maynooth University. He is the co-editor of Dallas Medieval Texts and Translations. Prior to his tenure at Maynooth, he taught at the University of Dallas for twenty years.

He is a member of the Royal Irish Academy and of the ecumenical Beatrice Institute of Pittsburgh.

== Books ==
- Charred Root of Meaning: Continuity, Transgression, and the Other in Christian Tradition (Grand Rapids, Michigan: Eerdmans, 2018).
- The Story of a Great Medieval Book: Peter Lombard's "Sentences" (Toronto: Toronto University Press, 2007).
- Peter Lombard (New York: Oxford University Press, 2004), OCLC 1016204141
- Understanding Scholastic Thought with Foucault (New York/London: St Martin's Press/Macmillan, 1999).
- Omne ens est aliquid. Introduction à la lecture du "système" philosophique de saint Thomas d'Aquin (Louvain: Peeters, 1996).
- Omne agens agit sibi simile: A "Repetition" of Scholastic Metaphysics (Louvain: Leuven University Press, 1996).
- Rosemann, Philipp W. (17 January 2015). Mediaeval Commentaries on the Sentences of Peter Lombard. Medieval commentaries on the Sentences of Peter Lombard. Vol. 3. Brill. p. 58. ISBN 9789004283046. OCLC 902674270.
