= Edward Goodwin Ballard =

American philosopher (1910–1989)

- Born: 1910
- Died: 1989 (aged 78–79)

Philosophical work
- Era: 21st-century philosophy
- Region: Western philosophy
- School: Continental philosophy
- Institutions: Tulane University
- Doctoral students: John Sallis

Edward Goodwin Ballard (1910 - 1989) was an American philosopher and Professor Emeritus of Philosophy at Tulane University. Ballard is known for his works on philosophy of culture.

== Works ==
- Socratic ignorance,: An essay on Platonic self-knowledge, Socratic ignorance,: An essay on Platonic self-knowledge,
- Centennial Year Number (Tulane Studies in Philosophy)
- A Symposium on Kant (Tulane Studies in Philosophy)
- Philosophy at the Crossroads
- Studies in Social Philosophy (Tulane Studies in Philosophy) by Edward G. Ballard (2008-06-13)
- The philosophy of Merleau-Ponty (Tulane Studies in Philosophy)
- The Nature of the Philosophical Enterprise (Tulane Studies in Philosophy)
- Studies in Whitehead's Philosophy (Tulane Studies in Philosophy) by Edward G. Ballard (2013-10-04) Tulane Studies in Philosophy Volume 5
- The Problem of Truth (Tulane Studies in Philosophy)
- Studies in Hegel: Reprint 1960 (Tulane Studies in Philosophy) by Alan B. Brinkley (2008-06-13)
- Studies in American Philosophy (Tulane Studies in Philosophy) (Volume 4)
