= North Texas Philosophical Association =

- Mission: to promote philosophical dialogue
- President: Charles R. Bambach
- Key people: Cynthia R. Nielsen, Dale Wilkerson, Michael B. Vendsel
- Website: http://ntxpa.org/

The North Texas Philosophical Association (NTPA) is a philosophical organization.
