= Lauren Swayne Barthold =

American philosopher (born 1965)

- Born: 1965 (age 60–61)
- Spouse: Pablo Muchnik

Education
- Education: George Washington University (BA), Regent College (MCS), Simon Fraser University (MA), New School for Social Research (PhD)
- Thesis: The Truth of Hermeneutics: The Self and Other in Dialogue in the Thought of Hans-Georg Gadamer (2002)
- Doctoral advisor: Richard J. Bernstein

Philosophical work
- Era: Contemporary philosophy
- Region: Western philosophy
- School: Continental philosophy
- Institutions: Endicott College; Gordon College
- Main interests: Hermeneutics

Lauren Swayne Barthold (born 1965) is an American philosopher and Philosophy Professor at Emerson College.

Previously, she was Associate Professor of Philosophy at Gordon College, with tenure, and has also taught at Haverford College, Siena College and Endicott College. Barthold is known for her works on Gadamer's thought. She is a co-founder and former president of the North American Society of Philosophical Hermeneutics.

In 2018, she co-founded the Heathmere Center for Cultural Engagement, a non-profit devoted to dialogue and deliberation, and currently serves as its program developer.

== Reception ==
Tina Fernandes Botts calls Barthold’s book on hermeneutic approach to gender "subtle" and "satisfying", "because it caringly and responsibly articulates what is good and right about current feminist thinking in the hermeneutic vein on the topic of social identity, while at the same time gently highlighting the ways in which this thinking diverges from Gadamer’s own thinking."

== Books ==
- Overcoming Polarization in the Public Square: Civic Dialogue, Palgrave Macmillan, 2020
- A Hermeneutic Approach to Gender and Other Social Identities, Palgrave Macmillan, 2016
- Gadamer’s Dialectical Hermeneutics, Rowman and Littlefield, 2010
