= Driven (novel) =

Novel by James Sallis

- Author: James Sallis
- Language: English
- Genre: Crime fiction
- Publisher: Poisoned Pen Press
- Publication date: 2012
- Publication place: United States
- Pages: 147
- Preceded by: Drive

Driven is a 2012 novel by James Sallis that is a sequel to the novel Drive (2005).

== Plot ==
Seven years after the events of Drive, Driver is living in Phoenix under the name Paul West, engaged to be married. When two men attack him and his fiancée, leaving her dead, Driver seeks vengeance.

== Critical reception ==
John Wilwol of NPR wrote: "In the end, Driven is simply a great ride, and after you've burned through it like a muscle car burns through a gallon of unleaded, you may feel that particular American ache to hit the open road."
