= Drive (novel) =

Novel by James Sallis

- Cover of first edition
- Author: James Sallis
- Language: English
- Genre: Noir fiction
- Set in: Arizona; Los Angeles
- Publisher: Poisoned Pen Press
- Publication date: September 1, 2005
- Publication place: United States
- Media type: Print (hardcover)
- Pages: 158
- ISBN: 978-1-59058-181-0
- OCLC: 61363261
- Dewey Decimal: 813/.54
- LC Class: PS3569.A462 D75
- Followed by: Driven

Drive is a 2005 noir novel by American author James Sallis. The book was first published on September 1, 2005, through Poisoned Pen Press. In 2011, it was adapted into a feature film of the same name starring Ryan Gosling and directed by Nicolas Winding Refn with a screenplay by Hossein Amini. A sequel novel, Driven, was published in 2012.

== Plot ==
Set mostly in Arizona and Los Angeles, Drive is about a man who does stunt driving for movies by day and drives for criminals at night.

== Publication ==
Drive is an expansion of a story of the same name that Sallis originally wrote for the noir anthology Measures of Poison (2002), published by Dennis McMillan Publications. The novel was published by Poisoned Pen Press on September 1, 2005.

== Reception ==
Publishers Weekly called it Sallis' "most tightly written mystery to date, worthy of comparison to the compact, exciting oeuvre of French noir giant Jean-Patrick Manchette."

Marilyn Stasio, writing for The New York Times, called the novel "a perfect piece of noir fiction."

Paul Skenazy of The Washington Post praised the author's "refreshing, even startling" prose and called it "a lovely piece of work that makes you wish some other writers would take lessons from him."

Entertainment Weekly wrote that the novel "reads the way a Tarantino or Soderbergh neo-noir plays, artfully weaving through Driver's haunted memory and fueled by confident storytelling and keen observations about moviemaking, low-life living, and, yes, driving."

== Film adaptation ==
Drive was adapted by screenwriter Hossein Amini into a 2011 film of the same name, directed by Nicolas Winding Refn and starring Ryan Gosling as the protagonist. Refn won the Best Director Award at the 2011 Cannes Film Festival for his direction of the film.
