= Hölderlin's Hymn "The Ister" =

1942 lecture course by Martin Heidegger

- Author: Martin Heidegger
- Original title: Hölderlins Hymne »Der Ister«
- Language: German
- Publication place: Germany
- Preceded by: Contributions to Philosophy
- Followed by: The Question Concerning Technology

Hölderlin's Hymn "The Ister" (German: Hölderlins Hymne »Der Ister«) is the title given to a lecture course delivered by German philosopher Martin Heidegger at the University of Freiburg in 1942. It was first published in 1984 as volume 53 of Heidegger's Gesamtausgabe. The translation by William McNeill and Julia Davis was published in 1996 by Indiana University Press. "Der Ister" is a poem by Friedrich Hölderlin, the title of which refers to an ancient name for a part of the Danube River.

== Overview ==
In 1942, in the darkest depths of World War II and the National Socialist period, Heidegger chose to deliver a lecture course on a single poem by Friedrich Hölderlin: "Der Ister," about the river Danube. The course explored the meaning of poetry, the nature of technology, the relationship between ancient Greece and modern Germany, the essence of politics, and human dwelling. The central third of the lecture course is a reading of Sophocles' Antigone. Heidegger undertakes this reading of Antigone ostensibly because of the importance of this text for grasping the meaning of Hölderlin's poetry, but in doing so he repeats and extends a reading he had conducted in a different context in 1935. In terms of Heidegger's oeuvre, the 1942 lecture course is significant in that it is Heidegger's most sustained discussion of the essence of politics. Heidegger was only able to deliver two-thirds of the written text of the lecture course.

The lecture course is divided into three parts.

- Part one introduces the way in which Heidegger believes it is necessary to approach Hölderlin's poetry, arguing against the "metaphysical interpretation of art." He further argues that Hölderlin's poetry must be understood in terms of its essential kinship with the work of Sophocles.
- Part two retraces the interpretation of Sophocles' Antigone which Heidegger conducted in the 1935 lecture course, An Introduction to Metaphysics. He extends this reading, modifying it in subtle ways.
- Part three, which was never delivered, returns to Hölderlin's poetry, arguing that the figure of the river in the poem is in fact the poet, and vice versa.

== Part one: Poetising the essence of the rivers ==
=== The Ister hymn ===
The lecture course opens with a reflection on the Greek origin of the word "hymn," meaning song of praise, specifically in praise of the gods, the heroes, or contest victors, in preparation of the festival. Heidegger cites a line from Sophocles' Antigone connecting the noun and verb forms of the word, and then indicates that the sense in which Hölderlin's works are hymns must initially remain an open question.

Heidegger turns his attention to the first line of "Der Ister"—"Now come, fire!" What could this mean, if "fire" here indicates the sun or the dawn? What could it mean to call, or to have the vocation for such a calling, given that the dawn will come whether it is called or not? And what is meant by "Now," by naming the time of such a calling? From these questions Heidegger is drawn to ask what it means to "poetise," answering that poetising is always inaugurating something, that genuine poetising is always poetising "anew." Thus the "Now" of the first line speaks not only of the present, but toward the future.

Heidegger next focuses on the fact that it is clear that "the rivers come to language" in Hölderlin's poetry. On the one hand, the rivers are detached from human being, having their own "spirit"; on the other hand, the rivers are a locale at which human beings find their dwelling place. The question is thus that of the poetic essence of the river.

=== The metaphysical interpretation of art ===
Rather than delving immediately into this question, Heidegger makes a detour, elaborating the "metaphysical interpretation of art." He argues that metaphysical interpretations are incapable of comprehending Hölderlin's poetry.

According to the metaphysical interpretation, art presents objects in nature such as rivers, but this presentation is at the service of something else, of their "meaning" in the artwork. Heidegger speaks in this regard of the etymology of the words "allegory" and "metaphor." The metaphysical interpretation of art relies on the distinction between the sensuous and the non-sensuous, the aesthetic and the noetic, the sensible and the intelligible. And according to this interpretation the artwork exists not for itself, not as a sensuous object, but for the nonsensuous and suprasensuous, which is also named "spirit." In this way the superior and the true come to be identified with the spiritual.

Against the metaphysical interpretation of art, Heidegger asserts that the rivers in Hölderlin's poetry are in no way symbolic images of a higher or deeper content. He draws attention to the final lines of the poem—"Yet what that one does, that river, / No one knows"—in order to indicate that, whatever the rivers are, or whatever the river does, remains an enigma. Even the poet knows only that the river flows, but not what is decided in that flowing.

=== Locality and journeying ===
Heidegger then turns to a consideration of the river as the dwelling place of human beings. As such, the river is what brings human beings into their own and maintains them there. Yet what is their own often remains foreign to human beings for a long time, and can be abandoned by them because it threatens to overwhelm them. It is not something that produces itself, but must come to be appropriate, and needs to be appropriated. The river is of assistance in the becoming-homely of human beings, but this "assistance" is not an occasional support but a steadfast standing by.

To understand what this means, Heidegger considers some lines from another Hölderlin poem, "Voice of the People," in which the rivers are referred to as "vanishing" and as "full of intimation." That the rivers are vanishing means that they abandon the human landscape, without thereby being unfaithful toward that landscape. Yet as full of intimation, the rivers proceed into what is coming. Thus Heidegger sees Hölderlin as concerned with the temporality of the river in relation to the human, yet also with its spatiality—thus "the river is the journeying." The river is, he says, the journeying of becoming homely or, rather, the very locality attained in and through the journeying. His claim is that the river is the locality of the dwelling of human beings as historical upon the earth.

=== Rätsel ===
The river is an enigma (Rätsel). But Heidegger relates this to Raten, giving counsel, and to Rat, counsel, but also "care." To give counsel means to take into care. That the river is an enigma does not mean it is a puzzle we should wish to "solve." Rather, it means it is something we should bring closer to us as an enigma. We must understand this poetry, therefore, in something other than a calculative, technical way.

=== Space and time ===
Locality and journeying: this sounds like "space and time." Succession takes its course in time, as a sequence of moments, as a "flowing." But this is in fact only an understanding of space and time as an ordered, calculable, relationality. Whatever is subject to order must be posited in advance in such a way that it becomes accessible for order and control. Hence, for example, the reduction to coordinates. Yet for calculative observation, something is what it is only through what it performs. All modern thinking thinks in terms of order and performance. Human activity is thought as labour, equated with mechanical energy, and assessed according to the performative principle. Through such thinking space and time come to be considered so obvious as not to require any further thought.

=== Modern technology ===
Such modern thinking about space and time is essentially technological. Modern technology is different from every tool. Whereas the tool is a means, what is distinctive about modern technology is that this is no longer the case, and that it is instead unfolding a domination of its own. It demands its own kind of discipline and conquest. Thus, for example, the staged accomplishment of factories built for the purpose of fabricating machine tools for other factories. Modern machine technology is a specific kind of "truth." We may believe that technology, as the control of space and time, is never undertaken without purpose, and is therefore no end in itself. This, however, is a misunderstanding grounded in a failure to grasp the essence of modern technology. And this results from failing to question that which underpins it—the order and unity of "space and time."

Heidegger then deconstructs the concepts of space and time, arguing firstly that these cannot be merely "objects," as though they were some gigantic containers in which everything is accommodated. Yet neither can we conclude that they are merely subjective. Is space, over which wars erupt, merely imaginary? And is time, which tears us along and tears us away, merely subjective? Such metaphysical interpretations of space and time will be of no help in understanding the locality and journeying at the heart of Hölderlin's non-metaphysical poetising. Space and time comprise the framework for our calculative domination and ordering of the "world" through technology. But it remains undecided whether this process is turning human beings into mere planetary adventurers, or whether it is the beginning of another tendency, toward new forms of settlement and resettlement.

=== Dialogue ===
According to Heidegger, that poetry of Hölderlin's taking the form of the "hymn" has taken into its care this becoming homely in one's own. He asserts that "one's own" is in this case the German fatherland, but immediately adds that "coming to be at home is thus a passage through the foreign." This is why this poetry necessarily takes the form of a dialogue with foreign poets, specifically, Pindar and Sophocles. What must be carefully listened to in the hymnal poetry of Hölderlin is this "resonance" of Greek poetry, on which basis Heidegger turns to the interpretation of Antigone.

== Part two: The Greek interpretation of human beings in Sophocles' Antigone ==
=== The choral ode ===
The choral ode from the Antigone of Sophocles is according to Heidegger the singular work radiating throughout the poetry of Hölderlin. Heidegger had previously interpreted this ode in his 1935 lecture course, An Introduction to Metaphysics, and in 1942 he both recapitulates and extends this interpretation.

Like "Der Ister," the ode begins with a call to the dawning sun, yet it is clear the ode is equally concerned with darkness. Although the ode is concerned with the light and darkness of human being, this should not be interpreted to mean that the two main figures, Creon and Antigone, form an opposition. Each of these figures proceed from out of the unity of essence and nonessence, but differently in each case.

=== Deinon ===
The decisive word, according to Heidegger, occurs at the beginning of the ode: deinon. Heidegger translates this as das Unheimliche, the uncanny. Heidegger emphasises what he calls the "counterturning" character of the term. Deinon, he says, means the fearful, the powerful, and the inhabitual. But none of these definitional elements is one-dimensional. As the fearful, the deinon is also that which, as worthy of honour, can awaken awe. As the powerful, it may be that which looms over us, or that which is merely violent. As the inhabitual, the extraordinary, the extraordinariness of skill, it exceeds the ordinary, but it can do so as that which governs the ordinary and the habitual. As das Unheimliche, deinon names the unity of all these meanings.

The ode names the human being as deinon in manifold ways, indeed as the most uncanny being, das Unheimlichste. Heidegger ties this to his prior argument that human beings as poetised by Hölderlin are "unhomely" ("unheimisch"), that is, on the way toward becoming homely. The extraordinariness of human being is this being un-homely that is also a becoming homely. Heidegger makes clear that this being unhomely does not mean simply homelessness, wandering around, adventurousness, or lack of rootedness. Rather, it means that the sea and the land are those realms that human beings transform through skillfulness and use. The homely is that which is striven for in the violent activity of passing through the inhabitual. Yet even so, the homely is not attained in this activity: as the ode says, man "comes to nothing."

=== Poros ===
Human being is thus the being which finds passage through everything, yet always comes up short, expressed in the couple pantoporos aporos, where poros means that irruption of power that finds its way through. Infinitely skillful and artful, human beings nevertheless can never circumvent death. This is something known by human beings, but mostly in the form of evading this knowledge. Human beings are in fact those beings which comport themselves to beings as such, and because they understand being, human beings alone can also forget being. The uncanniness of human beings is that they alone are capable of "catastrophe," in the sense of a reversal turning them away from their own essence.

=== Polis ===
Heidegger next turns to the couple hypsipolis apolis, "towering high above the site," and "forfeiting the site." This couple is based in the word polis, and Heidegger notes that, if this is the origin of the word "political," then it is a mistake to understand the former on the basis of the latter—the polis is precisely not a political concept. The "political" is conventionally understood in terms of consciousness, in a "technical" manner, as the way in which history is accomplished. It is thus marked by a failure to question itself.

Heidegger asks whether the polis might not be the name of that realm which constantly becomes questionable anew and remains worthy of question. Perhaps the polis is that around which everything question-worthy and uncanny turns in an exceptional way. Heidegger uses the word Wirbel, swirl, in this context, and speaks of the polis as essentially "polar." The pre-political essence of the polis, that which makes possible everything which we call political, is the open site from out of which all human relations toward beings are determined.

=== Human being ===
It is thus the essence of human being to both ascend within their site and to be without site. Human being bears within it this potential for reversal, a potential essentially grounded in the possibility of being mistaken, of taking nonbeings for beings and beings for nonbeings. Thus human beings are creatures of risk. They seek to become homely within a site, place everything at stake in this, and encounter the fact that the homely refuses itself to them.

This is the uncanniness of human being, and this is why deinon does not mean simply power and violence. Human beings do not themselves make themselves the most uncanny thing; it is not a matter of self-consciousness here. Only because human beings can say "it is," Heidegger says, can they say "I am." And only because they have a relation to being can they "say" at all, that is, can they be Aristotle's zoon logon echon. It is the distinction of human beings, in other words, to "see" the open.

=== Antigone ===
The closing words of the ode speak of the expulsion of the most uncanny from the hearth. If we were to interpret this as a rejection of Creon, according to Heidegger, then the choral ode would not be a "high song of culture" so much as a song in praise of mediocrity, of hatred toward the exception. To interpret otherwise than this means asking where Antigone herself stands in relation to the deinon.

In the introductory dialogue between Antigone and Ismene, Ismene tries to dissuade her sister from her resolution to bury their brother. Antigone's "pursuit" is, she says, concerned with that against which nothing can avail. Antigone, in other words, takes the impossible as her point of departure. She says herself that she wishes to suffer or bear the uncanny. In this she is removed from all human possibilities, and is the supreme uncanny.

=== The hearth ===
What, then, of the hearth? The chorus speaks not only of expulsion, but of "not sharing their delusion with my knowing." All knowledge of the deinon is sustained and guided by that knowing which knows the hearth. The content of this knowing is not stated directly, but it is, however, referred to as a phronein, a meditating from the heart. If this knowledge takes the form of intimation, it is not mere opinion.

If mythology is not simply an "immature" invention, then thinking stands in an essential relation to poetising. Thinking is not the sediment left after the demythologising of myth. Such reflections are intended by Heidegger to assist in the following gesture: the assertion that the hearth, named by the chorus, is being. "Being is the hearth." He then cites Plato on Hestia, the goddess named for the hearth. The expulsion referred to in the closing words of the choral ode is not a rejection of the unhomely, as much as an impulsion to be attentive to the homely, to risk belonging to it. Being unhomely is a not yet awakened, not yet decided, potential for being homely. This is Antigone's supreme action.

=== The purest poem ===
In Heidegger's translation, what determines this action is stated by Antigone as being beyond both the upper and lower gods, beyond Zeus and Dike, but neither can it be any human ordinance. Hence at stake in her action is the most uncanny risk. The closing words of the ode call in the direction of a knowledge of the proper essence of the unhomely one. In this most enigmatic part of his interpretation, Heidegger speaks of "the risk of distinguishing and deciding between that being unhomely proper to human beings and a being unhomely that is inappropriate." To be this risk is Antigone's essence.

Thus Heidegger concludes that to understand the truth of Antigone, it is necessary to think beyond the cult of the dead or the cult of blood-relatedness, which seem at first glance to be the motors of the tragedy. Antigone, he says, is herself the purest poem. Poetising is neither finding nor inventing, but a telling finding of being, revealing that which is always already revealed, the nearest of all that is near. The human potential for being, and the unhomely being homely of human beings upon the earth, is poetic. What is spoken in the choral ode remains indeterminate, but neither vague nor arbitrary. The indeterminate is, on the contrary, that which is undecided yet first to be decided. If this is the case, then the tragedy poetises that which is in the highest sense worthy of poetising. And this may be why this ode came to speak ever anew to the poet Hölderlin.

== Part three: Hölderlin's poetising of the essence of the poet as demigod ==
=== One's own and the foreign ===
Sophocles' ode and Hölderlin's river hymns poetise the Same, yet they are not identical. To understand this, Heidegger turns to Hölderlin's famous letter to Casimir Boehlendorff, which thematises the relations between Germany and Greece. According to Heidegger's reading, what for the Greeks is their own is what is foreign to the Germans, and what is foreign to the Germans is what is proper to the Greeks. Hölderlin is the first to experience poetically that becoming homely means being unhomely, thus to understand the need of being unhomely, which he does by venturing into an encounter with the (Greek) foreign.

=== Spirit ===
Heidegger then cites Hölderlin: "namely at home is spirit / not at the commencement, not at the source." He asks: who is "spirit"? Despite the influence of German metaphysics, Heidegger argues that Hölderlin's use of this word was singular, as that which is alongside itself in thinking itself, and always as "communal" spirit. What spirit thinks is that which is fittingly destined for human beings, yet this is always that which is futural, never something that has been decided; it is something "non-actual" that is already "acting." Poetising is the telling of the thoughts of spirit.

Spirit is never "at home" in the beginning. At the beginning of the history of a people, their destiny is assigned, but what has been assigned is in coming; it is still veiled and equivocal. In the beginning, the ability to fit oneself to one's destiny is as yet disordered, unpracticed. Thus in spirit there prevails the longing for its own essence. But "spirit loves colony," that is, in the foreign it wills the mother who is difficult to attain. And it loves "bold forgetting," where forgetting means the readiness to learn from the foreign for the sake of what is one's own, so as to defer what is one's own until it is time. It is in this way that the law of being unhomely is the law of becoming homely.

=== Greeks and Germans ===
The Greeks, too, had to pass through the foreign. What was proper to the Greeks was "the fire from the heavens"; what was foreign was the "clarity of presentation." Through what was foreign to them they were able to build at the essential ground of the polis. For the Germans, on the other hand, the clarity of presentation is natural—the formation of projects, frameworks, etc. What is foreign is the fire from heaven, and thus they must learn to be struck by this fire, and thereby impelled to the correct appropriation of their gift for presentation. Otherwise they shall be exposed to the weakness of suppressing every fire, of pursuing delimitation and institution only for the sake of it. Hölderlin is the one who has been struck by this fire, yet why must this be said poetically?

=== Poem, river, demigod ===
Heidegger cites Hölderlin in order to seek an answer to this question. "Full of merit, yet poetically / Humans dwell upon the earth." "Full of merit" refers, according to Heidegger, to all that humans achieve through the arts, through tekhne, but all that is achieved this way amounts merely to culture. It can be achieved only on the basis of a "dwelling" which can be seized upon through making or achieving within the realm of the actual. Dwelling, the becoming homely of a being unhomely, is grounded in the poetic.

But what is poetry? There must be a poet who poetises in advance the essence of poetry. This will be the poet who ventures into the foreign, to let the fire come toward him. This is what occurs in Hölderlin's hymnal poetry. This river poetry never forgets the source, in its issuing and flowing from the source. What it says is the holy, which, beyond the gods, determines the gods. The poet stands between human beings and gods. The poet, and the river, are demigods.

Heidegger speaks of the lines of the hymn concerning the invitation to Hercules. We can know nothing of the Ister or the hymn if we do not understand who this guest is. The appropriation of one's own is only as the encounter and guest-like dialogue with the foreign. The river must remain in the realm of its source in such a way that it flows toward it from out of the foreign, which is why it "appears, however, almost / To go backwards." Heidegger again uses the word Wirbeln to indicate this swirling near the source.

=== Historical, ahistorical, unhistorical ===
This relation to the foreign is never an affirmation of the "natural" or the "organic." These are foreign to the law of history. This law places historical humankind on the difficult path toward its essence. If humankind abandons the law of history, it falls into the unhistorical. Nature is ahistorical, but being unhistorical, as a rupture with the historical, is a particular kind of catastrophe. Heidegger's example of the unhistorical is Americanism.

=== A sign is needed ===
"A sign is needed": Hölderlin speaks of the sign as having a mind (Gemüt), where mind is the ground of all mindful courage (Mut). It is the poet who is named here as the sign. What is needed is the poet's word. Heidegger cites the poem "Andenken": "Yet what remains, the poets found." Heidegger relates the sign's showing to pain, to that knowing proper to being distinct. The sign, the demigod, the river, the poet: all these name poetically the singular ground of the becoming homely of human beings as historical, and the founding of this ground by the poet. At stake is a "partaking in feeling" with the gods, bearing the sun and moon, sharing the holy. This is for the benefit not only of human beings, but of the gods themselves, who are otherwise without feeling, without unity.

=== The stairs upon which the heavenly descend ===
Through the sign, through the rivers, the heavenly find their unity with one another, a unity which does not diminish their singularity. The rivers are their "joy." Hölderlin speaks of staircases on which the heavenly can descend. Where there are staircases, a dwelling place is also opened up poetically for humans. Poetising founding builds the stairs for this descent of the heavenly. The rivers are the children of the heavens, signs that bear sun and moon in mind, but at the same time the sons of the earth.

The hymn ends on an enigmatic note: "Yet what that one does, that river, / No one knows." What the vocation of the Ister is, it well knows, but the Rhine, which does not linger at its source but departs sideways, is altogether concealed. Yet the Ister hymn too breaks off—it shows, it makes manifest, yet it also conceals.

=== Is there a measure on earth? ===
Heidegger appends a concluding remark to his reading of the poem. His remarks on the hymn were intended to make us attentive to the poetising of the rivers. But because this is the poetising of the essence of poetry, concealed relations prevail. Such poetry cannot at all be referred to the poet's ego, or to "subjectivity." The poet is the river, and vice versa. The unity of locality and journeying here cannot be conceived in terms of "space" and "time," for these are themselves the offspring of the realm that lets their openness spring forth.

This poetry demands a transformation in our ways of thinking and experiencing, and we must think beyond representations, symbols, and images. But if we must find a new measure, it must be asked whether we are capable of it. Hölderlin asks about this measure, and concludes there is no such measure on earth. This sounds like despair. Yet what Hölderlin means is that we must dwell poetically upon this earth, bearing and suffering it rather than forcing and seizing it. If we are strong enough to think, it may be sufficient for us to ponder from afar the truth of this poetry and what it poetises, so that we may suddenly be struck by it. Heidegger ends with a quotation from yet another Hölderlin hymn, "The Journey":

A dream it becomes for him who would
Approach it by stealth, and punishes him
Who would equal it with force.
Often it surprises one
Who indeed has scarcely thought it.

== In film ==
The lecture course formed the basis of the 2004 film The Ister.

== Bibliography ==
- Martin Heidegger (transl. William McNeill & Julia Davis) (1996). Hölderlin's Hymn "The Ister". Bloomington & Indianapolis: Indiana University Press. ISBN 978-0-253-33064-2.
