= James Sallis =

American writer (1944–2026)

- Born: James Chappelle Sallis; December 21, 1944; Helena, Arkansas, U.S.
- Died: January 27, 2026 (aged 81); Phoenix, Arizona, U.S.
- Occupations: Novelist, musician
- Relatives: John Sallis (brother)
- Writing career
- Language: English
- Period: 1970–2026
- Genres: Crime fiction, science fiction, poetry, biography
- Website: jamessallis.com

James Chapelle Sallis (December 21, 1944 – January 27, 2026) was an American crime writer, poet, science fiction writer, and biographer who wrote a series of novels featuring the detective character Lew Griffin set in New Orleans, and the 2005 novel Drive, which was adapted into a 2011 film of the same name.

== Early life ==
James Chappelle Sallis was born in Helena, Arkansas, on Dec. 21, 1944, to C. Horace Sallis and Mildred Sallis (née Liming). His father was an employee of the Arkansas Power & Light Company; his mother was the town clerk. His brother John Sallis became an academic philosopher. Sallis briefly attended Tulane University in New Orleans.

== Career and critical reception ==
Sallis began writing science fiction for magazines in the late 1960s. Having sold several stories to Damon Knight for his Orbit series of anthologies, and a story to Michael Moorcock by the time he was in his mid-twenties, Sallis was then invited to go to London to help edit New Worlds just as it changed to its large format during its Michael Moorcock-directed New Wave SF phase. Sallis published his first sf story, "Kazoo", there in 1967 and was co-editor from April 1968 through February 1969. His clearly acknowledged models in the French avant-garde and the gnomic brevity of much of his work limited his appeal in the science fiction world, though he received some critical acclaim for A Few Last Words (collection, 1970). Sallis has been influenced by French New Novelists including Michel Butor and Robbe-Grillet. Camus’s L'Etranger is mentioned in each of Sallis's novels.

In all he published over 150 short works. Later short work (uncollected until Time's Hammers) appeared in the USA through the 1970s and 1980s.

Sallis worked as a creative writing teacher, respiratory therapist, musician, music teacher, screenwriter, periodical editor, book reviewer and translator, winning acclaim for his 1993 version of Raymond Queneau's Saint Glinglin. Trained as a respiratory therapist, Sallis worked as a neonatal respiratory therapist in various county hospitals in the US. He also played in an eclectic band called Three-Legged Dog.

In 2000, he appeared as himself in the UK Channel 4 project Asylum (2000)—a mix of both documentary and fiction, where in the future a group of people are looking back at the twentieth century after a virus has wiped out most of the culture—written and directed by Christopher Petit and Iain Sinclair. Sallis appears alongside Michael Moorcock and Ed Dorn. In 2012, Sallis played a small part as a detective in the film The Detective's Lover, directed by Travis Mills. Sallis taught writing classes at Otis College in Los Angeles and until September 2015 at Phoenix College in Arizona; he left his job rather than sign a state-mandated loyalty oath that he regarded as unconstitutional.

In Literary Hub, Lisa Levy considered his output significant and diverse and ranked him as perhaps alongside Don DeLillo (b. 1936) and Thomas Pynchon (b. 1937).

On noir Sallis argued it is an oppositional form, working not to reinforce American culture but to subvert it: "there is no moral order save which a man creates from himself. Like high art, these stories worked hard to unfold the lies society tells us and the lies we tell ourselves."

== Personal life and death ==
His first marriage to painter June Rose ended in divorce; they had a son, Dylan, who predeceased James. In 1991 Sallis married Karyn Smith.

Sallis died after a long illness on January 27, 2026, at the age of 81.

== Awards (selection) ==
- Grand Prix de Littérature policière for 2012's The Killer is Dying
- Bouchercon lifetime achievement award, 2007
- Hammett Award for literary excellence in crime writing

== Adaptations ==
=== Radio ===
Eye of the Cricket was adapted for BBC Radio 7 as part of the Readings to Die For series. It aired in 2007, 2008 and 2010. The main voice artist was Ray Shell.

=== Film ===
In 2011, Sallis' novel Drive was adapted by director Nicolas Winding Refn into a film of the same name, starring Ryan Gosling and Carey Mulligan.

In 2022, Sallis' short story "Blue Devils" was adapted into a short film of the same name, directed by James Frank and starring Christopher Salazar, Todd Essary, and Alec Franco. It was shown at the 2022 Austin Film Festival.

== Published works ==
=== Novels ===
Lew Griffin series

Lew Griffin is an African-American detective in New Orleans. Somewhat down on his luck he can be found in various local bars drinking whiskey and listening to jazz. Lew is a reader of Richard Wright, Melville, Poe, Borges and Chester Himes, and his favorite book is "L'Etranger," by Albert Camus.

- The Long-Legged Fly. Carroll & Graf. 1992.
  - Reprint: No Exit Press, 1996
- Moth. New York: Carroll & Graf. 1993.
  - Reprints: No Exit Press, 1996; Walker & Co., 2003
- Black Hornet. New York: Carroll & Graf. 1994.
  - Reprints: No Exit Press, 1997; Walker & Co, 2003
- Eye of the Cricket (New York: Walker & Co, 1997 & 2000. Harpenden: No Exit Press, 1998)
- Bluebottle (New York: Walker & Co, 1999. Harpenden: No Exit Press, 1999)
- The Long-Legged Fly/Moth Omnibus Edition (Harpenden: No Exit Press, 2000)
- Ghost of a Flea (New York: Walker & Co, 2001 & 2000. Harpenden: No Exit Press, 2001)

John Turner series

- Cypress Grove (New York: Walker & Co, 2003. Harpenden: No Exit Press, 2003)
- Cripple Creek (New York: Walker & Co, 2006)
- Salt River (New York: Walker & Co, 2007)

The Driver series

- Drive (Scottsdale, AZ: Poisoned Pen Press, 2005): Set mostly in Arizona and L.A., Drive is about a man who does stunt driving for movies by day and drives for criminals at night. A film version was made in 2011 by director Nicolas Winding Refn, starring Ryan Gosling; Refn won the Best Director award at the 2011 Cannes Film Festival.
- Driven (2012): Seven years after the events of Drive, Driver is now living in Phoenix under the name Paul West, and is engaged to be married. When two goons attack him and his fiancée, leaving her dead, Driver seeks vengeance.

Other novels

- Renderings (Seattle, Washington: Black Heron Press, 1995)
- Death Will Have Your Eyes (New York: St Martins Press, 1997. Harpenden: No Exit Press, 1997)
- The Killer Is Dying (New York: Walker & Co, 2011)
- Others of My Kind (New York: Bloomsbury USA, 2013)
- Willnot (New York: Bloomsbury USA, 2016)
- Sarah Jane (New York: Soho Press, 2019)
- World's Edge: A Mosaic Novel (New York: Soho Press, 2026)
- Backwater (Soho Crime, 2026, ISBN 978-1-64129-860-5)

=== Short fiction ===
Collections

- A Few Last Words (New York: Macmillan, 1970).
- Limits of the Sensible World (Austin, Texas: Host Publications, 1994).
- Time's Hammers: Collected Stories (Edgbaston, Birmingham: Toxic, 2000).
- A City Equal to My Desire (Point Blank Press, 2004).
- The James Sallis Reader (Rockville, MD: Wildside Press, 2005).
- Potato Tree (Host Publications, Inc., 2007).

Stories (Note: Short stories unless otherwise noted.)

- Sallis, James (September 2013). "As yet untitled". Asimov's Science Fiction. 37 (9): 56–57.
- The Berserkers, ed. Roger Elwood, Trident, 1974.

=== Anthologies ===
- The War Book (London: Rupert Hart-Davis, 1969/Panther, 1971) - includes his short story "And then the dark..."
- The Shores Beneath (New York: Avon Books, 1973).

=== Poetry ===
Collections

- Sorrow's Kitchen (East Lansing: Michigan State University Press, 2000).
- Rain's Eagerness (Hemet, CA: The Aldrich Press, 2013).
- Black Night's Gonna Catch Me Here: New & Selected Poems (Moorhead, MN: New Rivers Press, 2015).

=== Criticism, essays, and biographies ===
- Difficult Lives: Jim Thompson – David Goodis – Chester Himes (New York: Gryphon Books, 1993; rev. ed., 2000).
- Ash of Stars: On the Writings of Samuel R. Delany (Jackson, Mississippi: University Press of Mississippi, 1996), edited by James Sallis.
- Gently into the Land of the Meateaters (Seattle, Washington: Black Heron Press, 2000).
- Chester Himes: A Life (Edinburgh: Payback Press, 2000. New York: Walker & Co, 2001).

=== Book reviews ===
Year	Review article	Work(s) reviewed
2000	"Books". F&SF. 99 (1): 32–37. July 2000. Archived from the original on December 27, 2004.	Tevis, Walter (1999). The man who fell to Earth. Del Rey Impact.; Tevis, Walter (1999). Mockingbird. Del Rey Impact.
2000	"Books". F&SF. 99 (6): 32–37. December 2000. Archived from the original on December 27, 2004.	Bisson, Terry (2000). In the upper room and other likely stories. Tor. ISBN 9780312874049.; Barrett, Neal Jr. (2000). Perpetuity blues and other stories. Tor.
2001	"Books". F&SF. 100 (4): 30–35. April 2001. Archived from the original on December 27, 2004.	Sturgeon, Theodore (2000). Paul Williams (ed.). A saucer of loneliness. The Complete Stories of Theodore Sturgeon; 7. North Atlantic Books.; Sturgeon, Theodore (2000). Selected stories. Vintage Books.

=== Musicology ===
- The Guitar Players: One Instrument and Its Masters in American Music (New York: William Morrow, 1982; Lincoln, Nebraska, and London: Bison Books/University of Nebraska Press, 1994, rev. ed.).
- Jazz Guitars: An Anthology (New York: William Morrow, 1984), edited by James Sallis.
- The Guitar in Jazz (Lincoln, Nebraska: University of Nebraska Press, 1996), edited by James Sallis.

=== Translation work ===
- Saint Glinglin (Dalkey Archive Press, 1993; trade paperback 2000) by Raymond Queneau.
- My Tongue in Other Cheeks (Obscure Publications, 2003) — selected translations of poems from French, Spanish and Russian.
