= Richard Schacht =

American philosopher

Richard Schacht (born 1941) is an American philosopher and professor emeritus at the University of Illinois Urbana-Champaign now residing in Santa Fe, New Mexico.

He is an expert on the philosophy of Friedrich Nietzsche, was the editor of International Nietzsche Studies, and is former executive director of the North American Nietzsche Society. His philosophical interests include European philosophy after Kant, particularly Friedrich Nietzsche and Georg Wilhelm Friedrich Hegel, and concepts such as human nature, alienation, and value theory.

== Publications ==
=== Authored ===
- Alienation. Garden City, NY: Doubleday. 1970.
  - Doubleday Anchor (paperback). 1971.
  - British edition (hard cover and paperback): 1971 (London: George Allen & Unwin) Reprinted 1984: University Press of America; Reprinted 2015: Psychology Press
- Hegel and After: Studies in Continental Philosophy Between Kant and Sartre (Pittsburgh: University of Pittsburgh Press, 1975), Pitt Paperback edition: 1975
- Nietzsche (London: Routledge & Kegan Paul, 1983), Routledge Paperback ed.: 1985. Reissued 1994.
- Classical Modern Philosophers: Descartes to Kant (London: Routledge & Kegan Paul, 1984). Reissued 1994.
- The Future of Alienation (Urbana: University of Illinois Press, 1994)
- Making Sense of Nietzsche (Urbana: University of Illinois Press, 1995)
- Finding an Ending: Reflections on Wagner's Ring, with Philip Kitcher (Oxford University Press, 2004)
- Nietzsche's Kind of Philosophy: Finding his Way. University of Chicago Press. 2023. ISBN 9780226822853. OCLC 1304353648.

=== Edited ===
- Nietzsche: Selections (New York: Macmillan, 1993)
- Nietzsche, Genealogy, Morality (Los Angeles: University of California Press, 1994)
- Human, All Too Human, by Friedrich Nietzsche, trans. R.J. Hollingdale (NY: Cambridge U P, 1996)
- Schacht, Richard, ed. (2000). Nietzsche's Postmoralism: Essays on Nietzsche's Prelude to Philosophy's Future. New York: Cambridge University Press. doi:10.1017/CBO9780511570636. ISBN 9780511570636. OCLC 715157136.
- The Norton Anthology of Western Philosophy: After Kant – 1: The Interpretive Tradition. W. W. Norton & Company. 2017. ISBN 978-0-393-97468-3.

== See also ==
- Nietzsche: Philosopher, Psychologist, Antichrist
