= Theodore George =

American philosopher (born 1971)

Theodore D. George
- Born: 1971 (age 54–55)
- Awards: John Tich Award for Scholarly Excellence, Association of Former Students Teaching Award

Academic background
- Education: Whitman College; Villanova University (PhD)
- Thesis: Hegel's Speculative Theory of Political Life: Community and Tragedy in the "Phenomenology of Spirit" (2000)
- Doctoral advisor: Dennis J. Schmidt

Academic work
- Era: Contemporary philosophy
- Region: Western philosophy
- School or tradition: Continental
- Institutions: Texas A&M University
- Main interests: Hermeneutics, philosophy of art, post-Kantian philosophy

Theodore Dennis George (born 1971) is an American philosopher and professor and chair of the department of philosophy at Texas A&M University. He is known for his expertise on post-Kantian philosophy and hermeneutics, in particular, his work on Hans-Georg Gadamer. George is the editor of Epoché: A Journal for the History of Philosophy. He was the president of North American Society for Philosophical Hermeneutics between 2013 and 2016.

== Books ==
- The Responsibility to Understand: Hermeneutical Contours of Ethical Life (Edinburgh: Edinburgh University Press, 2020)
- Charles Bambach and Theodore George, eds., Philosophers and their Poets: Reflections on the Poetic Turn in Philosophy Since Kant (Albany: State University of New York Press, 2019)
- Tragedies of Spirit: Tracing Finitude in Hegel’s Phenomenology (State University of New York Press, 2006; paperback, 2007), ISBN 978-0791468654
- Günter Figal, Objectivity: The Hermeneutical and Philosophy (Albany: State University of New York Press, 2010), English translation of Günter Figal, Gegenständlichkeit: Das Hermeneutische und die Philosophie (Tübingen: Mohr Siebeck, 2006). Paperback edition: July 2011.

== Articles ==
- George, Theodore. “Art as Testimony of Tradition and as Testimony of Ordering.” Internationales Jahrbuch für Hermeneutik 16 (2007): 107–120.
- George, Theodore. “What is the Future of the Past? Gadamer and Hegel on Truth, Art, and the Ruptures of Tradition.” Journal of the British Society for Phenomenology 40 (2009): 4–20.
- George, Theodore. “From Work to Play: Gadamer on the Affinity of Art, Truth, and Beauty.” Internationales Jahrbuch für Hermeneutik, 10 (2011): 107–122.
- George, Theodore. "Thing, Object, Life." Research in Phenomenology 42 (2012): 18–43.
- George, Theodore. "Are We a Conversation? Hermeneutics, Exteriority, and Transmittability." Research in Phenomenology 47 (2017): 331–350.
