= Pablo Muchnik =

American philosopher

- Born: 1966 (age 59–60)
- Spouse: Lauren Swayne Barthold

Education
- Education: New School for Social Research (PhD)
- Thesis: The Consistency of Kant’s Doctrine of Radical Evil (2002)
- Doctoral advisor: Richard J. Bernstein

Philosophical work
- Era: 21st-century philosophy
- Region: Western philosophy
- School: Continental philosophy
- Main interests: philosophy of Kant

Pablo Muchnik (born 1966) is an American philosopher born in Argentina. He is Professor of Philosophy at Emerson College. He was the president of the North American Kant Society (2014-2017). Muchnik is known for his works on philosophy of Immanuel Kant. He received various national and international scholarships and awards, and codirects the book series Kantian Questions(Cambridge Scholar Publishers) and Kant’s Sources in Translation (Bloomsbury).

== Books ==
- Kant's Theory of Evil: An Essay on The Dangers of Self-Love and the Aprioricity of History, Lexington Books, 2009
- Rethinking Kant (ed.), Cambridge Scholar Publishing, vol. I, 2008; vol. II, 2010
- Kant's Anatomy of Evil (ed.), Cambridge University Press, 2010
