= Zollikon Seminars =

Series of phenomenological psychiatry seminars

The Zollikon Seminars were a series of philosophical seminars delivered between 1959 and 1969 by the German philosopher Martin Heidegger (1889–1976) at the home of Swiss psychiatrist Medard Boss (1903–1990). The topic of the seminars was Heidegger's ontology and phenomenology as it pertained to the theory and praxis of medicine, psychology, psychiatry and psychotherapy. The protocols of the seminars, along with correspondences between Heidegger and Boss, were published in German in 1987 under the title Zollikoner Seminare. Protokolle - Zwiegespräche - Briefe. Herausgegeben von Medard Boss, comprising 382 pages. The English version of the text was published in 2001 (360 pages). A more complete German edition was published in 2017 as part of Heidegger's Complete Works (GA 89), titled Zollikoner Seminare, comprising 880 pages. The complete GA 89 Table of Content is here.

== Background ==
Boss, trained as a psychoanalytic psychiatrist within the framework of natural scientific medicine, served as a field doctor during World War II—a role required of all Swiss men not deemed psychologically unfit. During this time, he read Heidegger's dense and complex text, Being and Time. He initially remarked that he "understood almost none of its content". Yet, as a psychiatrist, Boss was captivated by the ideas, which he evaluated as "fundamentally new, unheard of insights into the human being's way of existing in the world", and was intrigued by the author. Following World War II, Boss inquired about Heidegger, at which he was informed about Heidegger's participation in the Nazi Party and was discouraged from entertaining Heidegger's philosophy. However, Boss sought to distinguish Heidegger's philosophy from his character and, after evaluating the former, decided to write him a letter. In 1947, Boss wrote Heidegger, asking him to clarify some of his philosophical ideas. To Boss's surprise, Heidegger replied. For the next twelve years, Boss and Heidegger corresponded by mail and in personal visits. Boss, though, "did not feel it proper to be the only one benefitting from frequent meetings with a great thinker." With Heidegger's permission, Boss opened up their discussions with colleagues and students, beginning the Zollikon Seminars.

== The Seminars ==
The Zollikon Seminars were conducted intermittently, "two to three times per semester", between 1959 and 1969. Boss noted that Heidegger dedicated three hours a night, two nights a week to the task, and typically spent the day before preparing the lectures. Typically, fifty to seventy of Boss's psychiatric colleagues and students were invited to the lectures.

The first seminar was on 8 September 1959 in the auditorium of the Burghölzli Clinic at University of Zurich. Heidegger included in his introductory lecture a brief explication of Da-sein, "the basic constitution of human being" as "being-in-the-world". He also offered to the students a radical diversion from conventional Cartesian epistemology, namely "all objectifying representations of a capsule-like psyche, subject, person, ego or consciousness in psychology and psychopathology must be abandoned in favor of a new understanding." Boss observed at this time that the modern, technological conveniences of the lecture hall were ill-fitting for Heidegger's thought, so the remainder of the seminars were held at Boss's home.

The first lecture was documented only as a result of Heidegger's notes. The lectures given between 1960 and 1964 do not appear to have been recorded; they are absent from the Zollikon Seminars text. The subsequent lectures, given between 24 January 1964 until the end were transcribed verbatim (though possibly not in their entirety) or condensed.

Boss noticed that the initial sessions were extremely difficult. He described Heidegger's attempt to discuss his philosophy with medically trained doctors and students "as if a man from Mars were visiting a group of earth-dwellers and trying to communicate with them." Boss also noted that many of Heidegger's questions about the human being (and the human kind of being), existence, space, time, and so on were answered with prolonged periods of silence, or worse, "shock or even outrage" that the questions were being asked in the first place. As late as 1964, even Heidegger still admitted that seminars were difficult. In the lecture dated 9 July 1964, Heidegger said, "The last seminar rather was a failure. However, the difficulty lies in the subject matter itself...which is being itself." Yet, Boss was consistently sympathetic to Heidegger's task, which he described as "Sisyphean, of "giving my friends, colleagues, and students a sound philosophical foundation for the medical practice." Neither Heidegger nor the seminar students "grew tired" of the material and worked to "achieve a common ground" in their thinking.

General topics:

- Kant: Sein ist kein reales Prädikat. (1960).
- Der Raum als das Freie und Offene. (1964).
- Die Frage nach dem Sein der Zeit. (1964).
- Die Frage was die Zeit ist. (18 and 21 January 1965).
- Das Leibproblem und das Methodebewußtsein der Wissenschaften (1965).
- Die Daseinsanalytik (1965).
- Grundzug des Menschseins (1966).
- Das Räumlichsein des Daseins und das Im-Raume-sein des Gebrauchdinges (1969).

== Afterword ==
The last of the Zollikon Seminars was held in July, 1969. Boss observed that with his "conscience as a doctor" he could no longer expect Heidegger, growing in age and declining in physical ability, to prepare and participate in the seminars. Boss and Heidegger agreed to continue corresponding via mail, and Boss visited Heidegger's home in Freiburg as both their schedules allowed. In one of his last documented letters (dated 21 February 1971), Heidegger congratulated Boss on an award granted him by the American Psychological Association. He also encouraged Boss to continue with many of the ideas discussed in the seminars and suggested several of his own texts, but also dissuaded Boss from reading any of "the literature on Heidegger". After that, Heidegger retired to his Black Forest cabin and "limited his visits and letters." Heidegger died in 1976, though before his death he contributed to and edited Boss's text Existential Foundations of Medicine and Psychology, published in 1979. Boss died in 1990.

== Selected passages ==
- 24 or 28 January 1964

Why can't there be something real that is not susceptible to exact measurement? Why not sorrow, for example?

- 2 November 1964

The basic character of nature represented by the natural sciences is conformity to law. Calculability is a consequence of this conformity to law. Of all that is, only that which is measurable and quantifiable is taken into account.

- 18 January 1965

The nature of being sick cannot be adequately grasped without a sufficient determination of being healthy...It is an ontological phenomenon, that is, it refers to a possibility of being and not merely to the logic of a propositional negation.

- 11 May 1965

But are the connections between psyche and soma something psychological, something somatic, or neither one or the other? We wind up in a dead end, which shows you better than anything else how essential the question of method is.

- 6 July 1965

In Greek and medieval thought, the concept of an object and of objectivity did not yet exist. Objectivity is a definite modification of the presence of things...Modern science rests on the transformation of the experience of the presence of beings into objectivity.

- 23 November 1965

Daseinanalysis is ontic. The analytic of Dasein is ontological.

== See also ==
- Zollikon
- Heidegger Gesamtausgabe
- HGA 89. Zollikoner Seminare, ed. Peter. Trawny, 2017, XXXII, 880p.
