= John Sallis =

American philosopher (1938–2025)

- Born: John Cleveland Sallis; June 8, 1938; Poplar Grove, Arkansas, U.S.
- Died: February 18, 2025 (aged 86)
- Spouse: Jerry Sallis
- Children: 2
- Relatives: James Sallis (brother)

Education
- Education: Tulane University (PhD, 1964)
- Thesis: The Concept of World: A Study in the Phenomenological Ontology of Martin Heidegger (1964)
- Doctoral advisor: Edward Goodwin Ballard

Philosophical work
- Era: Contemporary philosophy
- Region: Western philosophy
- School: Continental philosophy Phenomenology
- Institutions: Boston College
- Doctoral students: James C. Risser
- Notable students: David Farrell Krell
- Main interests: Philosophy of imagination

John Cleveland Sallis (October 2, 1938 – February 18, 2025) was an American philosopher known for his work in the tradition of phenomenology. From 2005 until his death, he was the Frederick J. Adelmann Professor of Philosophy at Boston College. He previously taught at Pennsylvania State University (1996–2005), Vanderbilt University (1990–1995), Loyola University of Chicago (1983–1990), Duquesne University (1966–1983) and the University of the South (1964–1966).

== Biography ==
Sallis obtained his doctorate from Tulane University in 1964. His dissertation was entitled The Concept of World. He received an honorary doctorate from the University of Freiburg, Germany.

Sallis died on February 18, 2025, at the age of 86. He was the brother of writer James Sallis.

== Academic interests ==
Sallis was known for his work on imagination and his careful readings of Plato. He also wrote on phenomenology, Martin Heidegger, Jacques Derrida, Immanuel Kant, Johann Gottlieb Fichte, Georg Wilhelm Friedrich Hegel, and Friedrich Nietzsche, among many other figures and topics. He was the founding editor of the journal Research in Phenomenology.

== Bibliography ==
- Being and Logos: Reading the Platonic Dialogues (The Collected Writings of John Sallis) (2019)
- The Logos of the Sensible World: Merleau-Ponty's Phenomenological Philosophy (The Collected Writings of John Sallis) (2019)
- Elemental Discourses (2018)
- Cao Jun: Hymns to Nature (2018)
- Plato's Statesman: Dialectic, Myth, and Politics (SUNY series in Contemporary Continental Philosophy) (2018)
- Shades―Of Painting at the Limit (Studies in Continental Thought) (2017)
- The Return of Nature: On the Beyond of Sense (Studies in Continental Thought) (2017)
- The Figure of Nature: On Greek Origins (2016)
- Senses of Landscape (Comparative and Continental Philosophy) (2015)
- Klee's Mirror (SUNY series in Contemporary Continental Philosophy) (2015)
- Logic of Imagination: The Expanse of the Elemental (2012)
- Transfigurements: On the True Sense of Art (2008)
- The Verge of Philosophy (2007)
- Topographies (2006)
- Platonic Legacies (2004)
- On Translation (2002)
- Force of Imagination: The Sense of the Elemental (2000)
- Chorology: On Beginning in Plato's Timaeus (1999)
- Shades: Of Painting at the Limit (1998)
- Double Truth (1995)
- Stone (1994)
- Crossings: Nietzsche and the Space of Tragedy (1991)
- Echoes: After Heidegger (1990)
- Spacings—Of Reason and Imagination. In Texts of Kant, Fichte, Hegel (1987)
- Delimitations: Phenomenology and the End of Metaphysics (1986; 2nd edn. 1995)
- The Gathering of Reason (1980; 2nd. edn. 2005)
- Being and Logos: The Way of Platonic Dialogue (1975; 2nd edn. 1986; 3rd edn. Being and Logos: Reading the Platonic Dialogues, 1996)
- Phenomenology and the Return to Beginnings (1973; 2nd edn. 2002)

== See also ==
- American philosophy
- List of American philosophers
- List of deconstructionists

== Sources ==
- Bernard Freydberg, The Thought of John Sallis: Phenomenology, Plato, Imagination (Evanston: Northwestern University Press, 2012).
- Kenneth Maly (ed.), The Path of Archaic Thinking: Unfolding the Work of John Sallis (Albany: State University of New York Press, 1995). Including contributions from Walter Biemel, Peg Birmingham, Walter Brogan, Françoise Dastur, Jacques Derrida, Parvis Emad, Eliane Escoubas, Bernard D. Freydberg, Rodolphe Gasché, Michel Haar, John Llewelyn, Kenneth Maly, Adriaan Peperzak, James Risser, and Charles E. Scott, as well as a response by Sallis.
