= North American Nietzsche Society =

Society based on Nietzsche's philosophy in North America

- Founders: Bernd Magnus and Walter Arnold Kaufmann
- Established: 1979
- Mission: promote the study of the philosophy of Friedrich Nietzsche
- President: Paul Katsafanas
- Key people: Richard Schacht
- Website: http://www.northamericannietzschesociety.com/

The North American Nietzsche Society (NANS) is a philosophical society founded in 1979 whose purpose is to promote the study of the philosophy of Friedrich Nietzsche in North America.

== See also ==
- North American Kant Society
- North American Society for Philosophical Hermeneutics
