= Alejandro Vallega =

Chilean-born philosopher, writer, painter and academic

- Born: Alejandro Arturo Vallega Arredondo; February 18, 1964 (age 62); Santiago, Chile

Education
- Education: University of Vienna; St. John's College (Annapolis/Santa Fe)

Philosophical work
- Era: Contemporary philosophy
- Region: Western philosophy Latin American Thought
- School: Continental philosophy
- Institutions: University of Oregon
- Main interests: Aesthetics, phenomenology, hermeneutics, deconstruction, Ancient Greek thought, intercultural philosophy
- Notable ideas: Aesthetic thought, decolonial aesthetics, coloniality of time

Alejandro Arturo Vallega Arredondo (born February 18, 1964) is a Chilean-born Latin American painter and philosopher. He is a professor of philosophy at the University of Oregon. He is a Faculty Research Fellow of the Center for Gender and Africa Studies of the University of the Free State, South Africa. In his work, he develops an aesthetic philosophy, in which he engages the aesthetic of pre-reflexive affective, embodied, and memorial dimensions of understanding and living experience.

== Fields ==
His approach to philosophical understanding is informed by aesthetic experience and imagination. He works on Ancient Greek philosophy, Continental philosophy, and Latin American philosophy, and popular and indigenous thought.

Vallega has twice been co-director of the Collegium Phänomenologicum and is a member of the board of directors. He served as president of North American Society for Philosophical Hermeneutics. He is the editor of the English version of Enrique Dussel's Ethics of Liberation, and of the World Philosophies Series, published by Indiana University Press.

He has developed a body of painted works under the theme of "elemental painting."

== Books ==
- Heidegger and the Question of Space: Thinking on Exilic Grounds (Penn State Press, 1999)
- Sense and Finitude: Encounters at the Limit of Language, Art, and the Political (SUNY press, 2009–2010)
- Latin American Philosophy from Identity to Radical Exteriority (Indiana University Press, 2014)
- Tiempo y Liberación (Editorial AKAL, 2020)
- Light Traces with John Sallis (Indiana University Press, 2014)
- Dussel, Enrique. Ethics of Liberation: In the Age of Globalisation and Exclusion. Ed. Alejandro Vallega (Duke University Press, 2013)

== See also ==
- Eduardo Mendieta
- William McNeill (philosopher)
- Enrique Dussel
- Walter Mignolo
