= Laura Jordan Bambach =

Australian digital designer, creative director and feminist

- Born: 1973 or 1974 (age 51–52); Canberra, Australia
- Occupations: Digital designer and creative director
- Years active: 1994 to present
- Known for: Co-founder of SheSays

Laura Jordan Bambach is an Australian digital designer, creative director and influential feminist. She resides in London, United Kingdom.

She currently holds a senior position as the creative partner for Mr President and is co-founder of SheSays, a global mentorship and networking group that encourages women to pursue careers in digital marketing. She held the position of president for the global educational charity, D&AD, in 2013–2014. Bambach is the winner of numerous awards, including being ranked number one on The Drum's Digerati list of the top 100 most influential digital individuals in the UK in 2014. The Guardian has called her a "digital female icon".

== Early life and education ==
Laura Jordan Bambach was born in Canberra, Australia, and grew up on a hobby farm outside Sydney. She attended the James Ruse Agricultural High School and went on to study at the College of Fine Arts in Sydney where she studied photomedia and installation art to the Masters level. She began coding for the WWW in 1994 at university, after the encouragement from her lecturer, the digital artist Linda Dement.

== Career ==
She began her creative career in 1994 at Geekgirl, a cyberfeminist magazine started by Rosie Cross. She worked as creative director for the publishing house Terraplanet from 1997 to 1999, leading the move from print editions to online. At her next position at Deepend, she transferred from the firm's Sydney office to its London branch in 2000, and went on to work at the Lateral and ID Media agencies in London. In 2005 she became head of art at Glue.

In 2007, citing sexism and gender imbalance in the creative and digital marketing fields, she and Alessandra Lariu, senior creative director at Agency Republic, created SheSays, a global mentorship and networking group that encourages women to pursue careers in digital marketing and design. SheSays hosts monthly educational and networking meetups for women in over 30 cities in the United States, Canada, the UK, the Netherlands, Australia, South America and Asia. Its free mentoring program, called "Who's Your Momma", finds established digital industry executives volunteering to work one-on-one with newcomers for an hour a week. SheSays also holds an annual awards ceremony for female creatives called "SheSays Awards", celebrating the women whose ideas win major awards but don't get otherwise recognised due to agency hierarchies.

In 2008 Jordan Bambach joined LBi, where she was promoted to joint executive creative director. She became creative director and partner with Flo Heiss at Dare in 2012. In October 2013, Jordan Bambach became creative partner and founder of Mr President.

== Other activities ==
Jordan Bambach became a member of the British educational charity D&AD in 2011 and served as its vice-president in 2012 and president in 2013. She is presently a member of D&AD's board of trustees.

She founded the Cannt Festival in London as an alternative to the Cannes Lions.

She is a frequent speaker on Internet art. She contributed an essay to the 2010 book Digital Advertising: Past, Present, and Future and was quoted in the 2014 book Hacker, Maker, teacher, Thief: Advertising's Next Generation. She teaches hands-on and technical courses in digital media at the university level.

== Honors and awards ==
Jordan Bambach was named one of the 30 Under-30 Leaders in IT at the Fairfax Group awards in 1999. In 2011 she and Lariu, founders of SheSays, shared the Greatest Individual Contribution to New Media award at the New Media Age awards ceremony. In 2014 she was ranked number one on The Drum's Digerati list of the top 100 most influential digital individuals in the UK. She was also named Individual of the Year 2014 at the Dadis (The Drum Awards for the Digital Industries). In 2015 and 2016 she was honoured as one of the Fifty Most Inspiring Women in European Tech by the Inspiring Fifty. In 2015 and 2016 she was named one of the Debrett's 500, a compendium of the 500 most influential people in the UK.

She received an honorary doctorate from Norwich University of the Arts for "championing and encouraging women in design, creatively embracing digital technologies and engaging in design with a conscience".

She was recognized as one of the BBC's 100 women of 2017.

== Personal life ==
Jordan Bambach has one son.
