= Eugen Fink =

German philosopher (1905 – 1975)

- Fink in 1929
- Born: 11 December 1905; Konstanz, German Empire
- Died: 25 July 1975 (aged 69); Freiburg im Breisgau, West Germany

Education
- Education: University of Münster; Friedrich Wilhelm University; University of Freiburg (PhD, 1929; Dr. phil. hab., 1946)
- Doctoral advisor: Edmund Husserl (PhD advisor); Robert Heiß (Dr. phil. hab. advisor)
- Other advisor: Martin Heidegger (PhD examiner)

Philosophical work
- Era: 20th-century philosophy
- Region: Western philosophy
- School: Continental philosophy Phenomenology
- Institutions: Catholic University of Leuven; University of Freiburg
- Doctoral students: Friedrich-Wilhelm von Herrmann; Ernst Nolte
- Notable students: Jan Patočka; Heinrich Rombach
- Main interests: Ontology, philosophy of education
- Notable ideas: Philosophical cosmology Play as a symbol of the world (Spiel als Weltsymbol); Meontic phenomenology

Eugen Fink (German: [fɪŋk]; 11 December 1905 – 25 July 1975) was a German philosopher.

== Biography ==
Fink was born in 1905 as the son of a government official in Germany. He spent his first school years with an uncle who was a Catholic priest. Fink attended a grammar school in Konstanz where he succeeded with his extraordinary memory. After his graduation exam in 1925, he studied philosophy, history, German language and economics, initially at Münster and Berlin and then at Freiburg with Edmund Husserl.

== Philosophy ==
As Husserl's assistant from 1928, he was a representative of phenomenology, and at the same time he became familiar with the philosophy of Martin Heidegger. From early on, Fink was a critical recipient of their positions, thereby developing his own approach as a philosophical "cosmology". He approached the problem of Being as a manifestation of the cosmic movement of worldliness, with man being a participant in this movement.

Fink called the philosophical problems pre-questions, which are never ready-made problems with predetermined factors such as in natural sciences but have to be created in a genuine act of philosophical reflection.

== Works ==
- Vom Wesen des Enthusiasmus, Freiburg 1947
- Zur ontologischen Frühgeschichte von Raum - Zeit - Bewegung, Den Haag 1957
- Alles und Nichts, Den Haag 1959
- Spiel als Weltsymbol, Stuttgart 1960
- Nietzsches Philosophie, Stuttgart 1960
- Metaphysik und Tod, Stuttgart 1969
- Heraklit. Seminar mit Martin Heidegger, Frankfurt/Main 1970
- Erziehungswissenschaft und Lebenslehre, Freiburg 1970
- Natur, Freiheit, Welt : Philosophie der Erziehung, Wuerzburg, 1992
- Sein und Mensch. Vom Wesen der ontologischen Erfahrung, Freiburg 1977
- Grundfragen der systematischen Pädagogik, Freiburg 1978
- Grundphänomene des menschlichen Daseins, Freiburg 1979
- Grundfragen der antiken Philosophie, Würzburg 1985
- VI. Cartesianische Meditation. I: Die Idee einer Transzendentalen Methodenlehre Dordrecht 1988
- Welt und Endlichkeit, Würzburg 1990
- Hegel, Frankfurt 2006
- Eugen Fink Gesamtausgabe edited by Cathrin Nielsen and Hans Rainer Sepp in collaboration with Franz-Anton Schwarz, Freiburg: Alber, 2006-
- Published volumes:
  - Vol. 1. Nähe und Distanz. Studien zur Phänomenologie (2011);
  - Vol. 3.1 Die Doktorarbeit und erste Assistenzjahre bei Husserl (2006);
  - Vol. 3.3 Grammata: zu Husserls Krisis-Schriften, Dorothy Ott-Seminare, Interpretationen zu Kant und Hegel, Notizen zu Gesprächen im Umkreis der Freiburger Phänomenologie. (2011);
  - Vol. 7 Spiel als Weltsymbol (2010);
  - Vol. 13 Epilegomena zu I. Kants Kritik der reinen Vernunft (2010).

=== English translations ===
- Fashion: Seductive Play. Eds. Stefano Marino and Giovanni Matteucci. Translated by Christopher Turner and Ian Alexander Moore. London: Bloomsbury Press, 2023.
- Play as Symbol of the World. And Other Writings. Translated with an introduction by Ian Alexander Moore and Christopher Turner. Bloomington: Indiana University Press, 2016.
- Sixth Cartesian meditation. The Idea of a Transcendental Theory of Method with textual notations by Edmund Husserl. Translated with an introduction by Ronald Bruzina, Bloomington: Indiana University Press, 1995
- Nietzsche's Philosophy translated by Goetz Richter London, New York: Continuum, 2003
- Heraclitus Seminar. with Martin Heidegger, (Winter semester 1966/1967 at Freiburg University), Evanston, Ill.: Northwestern University Press, 1993
- Cairns, Dorion, Conversations with Husserl and Fink. The Hague: Martinus Nijhoff, 1976
- "Oasis of Happiness: Thoughts toward an Ontology of Play". Translated by Ian Alexander Moore and Christopher Turner. Purlieu: A Philosophical Journal 1, no. 4 (2012), pp. 20–42.
