= Friedrich-Wilhelm von Herrmann =

German philosopher (1934–2022)

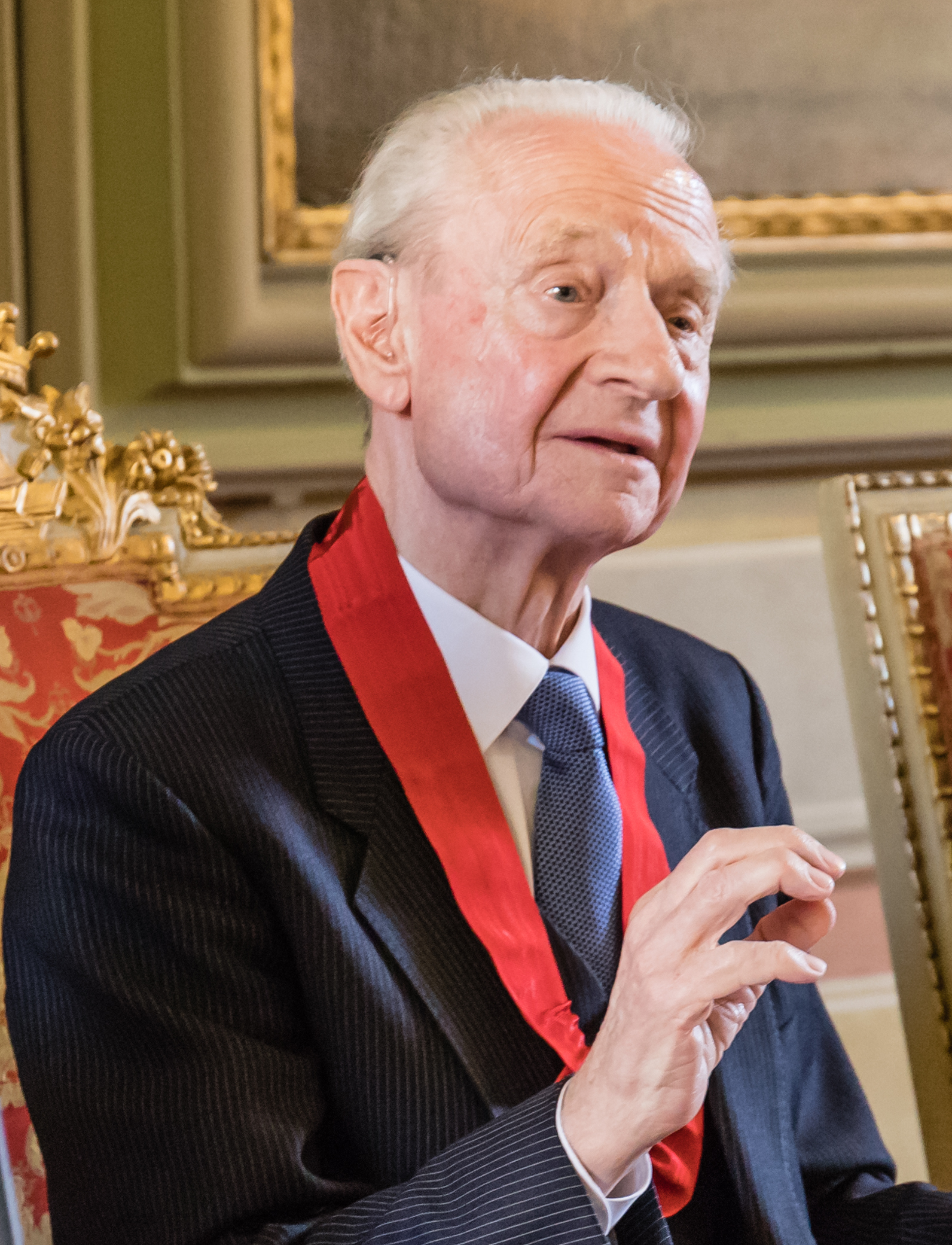
- Von Herrmann in 2019
- Born: 8 October 1934; Potsdam, Prussia, Nazi Germany
- Died: 2 August 2022 (aged 87); Freiburg, Germany

Education
- Education: Albert-Ludwigs-Universität Freiburg (PhD)
- Doctoral advisor: Eugen Fink

Philosophical work
- Era: 21st-century philosophy
- Region: Western philosophy
- School: Continental
- Institutions: Albert-Ludwigs-Universität Freiburg
- Doctoral students: Daniela Vallega-Neu

Friedrich-Wilhelm von Herrmann (German: [fɔn ˈhɛʁman]; 8 October 1934 – 2 August 2022) was a German philosopher. He was known for his expertise on Heidegger's thought, having worked with him at the University of Freiburg from 1972 to 1976. Herrmann taught there as professor from 1979 to 1999.

== Life and career ==
Herrmann was born in Potsdam, where he attended schools. He achieved the Abitur at the Wald-Oberschule in Berlin-Grunewald. He studied philosophy, history and German studies, first at the Free University Berlin from 1955 to 1957, then at the University of Freiburg. He achieved the doctorate in 1961, supervised by Eugen Fink. He then worked as Fink's assistant until 1970. He was habilitated in 1970, and subsequently lectured at the university. Hermann was appointed professor in 1979, being emerited in 1999.

=== Heidegger ===
Herrmann worked personally with Martin Heidegger from 1972 until his death in 1976. Heidegger appointed him as curator for a complete edition of his Works, begun in 1975 and ongoing. For Herrmann, it became a mission to teach about the philosopher internationally. He worked with Francesco Alfieri, editing an Italian edition of Heidegger's correspondence from 1930 to 1949 with his brother Fritz, which discusses political and social issues. In 2017, the two published Die Wahrheit über die “Schwarzen Hefte”, published by Duncker & Humblot in Berlin. It was translated in 2021 as Martin Heidegger and the Truth About the “Black Notebooks”, with bilingual excerpts from the Notebooks. In 2019, Herrmann published a commentary to Heidegger's Vom Ereignis, which was received as a welcome accessible approach to his philosophy.

=== Personal life ===
Herrmann was married to Veronika née Müeller-Osthaus. He died on 2 August 2022 at a clinic in Freiburg, where he spent a few days following a heart attack. He was 87.

== Bibliography ==
Herrmann's works include:

- Die Selbstinterpretation Martin Heideggers. Anton Hain, Meisenheim am Glan 1964
- Bewußtsein, Zeit und Weltverständnis. Klostermann, Frankfurt am Main 1971
- Husserl und die Meditationen Descartes. Klostermann, Frankfurt am Main 1971
- Subjekt und Dasein. Interpretationen zu "Sein und Zeit". Klostermann, Frankfurt am Main 1974 (3. erweiterte Auflage 2004)
- Heideggers Philosophie der Kunst. Eine systematische Interpretation der Holzwege-Abhandlung „Der Ursprung des Kunstwerkes“. Klostermann, Frankfurt am Main 1980 (2. erweiterte Auflage 1994)
- Der Begriff der Phänomenologie bei Heidegger und Husserl. Klostermann, Frankfurt am Main 1981
- Hermeneutische Phänomenologie des Daseins. Eine Erläuterung von „Sein und Zeit“. Bd. 1: „Einleitung: Die Exposition der Frage nach dem Sinn von Sein“. Klostermann, Frankfurt am Main 1987
- Weg und Methode. Zur hermeneutischen Phänomenologie des seinsgeschichtlichen Denkens. Klostermann, Frankfurt am Main 1990
- Heideggers „Grundprobleme der Phänomenologie“. Zur „Zweiten Hälfte“ von „Sein und Zeit“. Klostermann, Frankfurt am Main 1991
- Augustinus und die phänomenologische Frage nach der Zeit. Klostermann, Frankfurt am Main 1992
- Wege ins Ereignis. Zu Heideggers "Beiträgen zur Philosophie". Klostermann, Frankfurt am Main 1994
- Die zarte, aber helle Differenz. Martin Heidegger und Stefan George. Klostermann, Frankfurt am Main 1999
- Hermeneutik und Reflexion : der Begriff der Phänomenologie bei Heidegger und Husserl. Klostermann, Frankfurt am Main 2000
- Wahrheit – Freiheit – Geschichte : eine systematische Untersuchung zu Heideggers Schrift "Vom Wesen der Wahrheit". Klostermann, Frankfurt am Main 2002
- Hermeneutische Phänomenologie des Daseins: Ein Kommentar zu "Sein und Zeit". Bd. 2: "Erster Abschnitt: Die vorbereitende Fundamentalanalyse des Daseins" §9 – §27. Klostermann, Frankfurt am Main 2005
- Hermeneutische Phänomenologie des Daseins: Ein Kommentar zu "Sein und Zeit". Bd. 3: "Erster Abschnitt: Die vorbereitende Fundamentalanalyse des Daseins" §28 – §44. Klostermann, Frankfurt am Main 2008
- Descartes' Meditationen. Klostermann, Frankfurt am Main 2011
- Leibniz. Metaphysik als Monadologie. Duncker & Humblot, Berlin 2015, ISBN 978-3428-14738-0
