= Charles Bambach =

American philosopher

- Awards: Fulbright Fellowship

Education
- Education: University of Michigan (PhD), State University of New York at Cortland (BA)

Philosophical work
- Era: 21st-century philosophy
- Region: Western philosophy
- School: continental philosophy
- Institutions: University of Texas at Dallas
- Main interests: hermeneutics

Charles R. Bambach is an American philosopher and Professor at the University of Texas at Dallas. He is the president of the North Texas Philosophical Association and is known for his works on hermeneutics and contemporary continental philosophy.

== Books ==
- Heidegger, Dilthey, and the Crisis of Historicism, Cornell University Press 1995
- Heidegger’s Roots: Nietzsche, National Socialism, and the Greeks, Cornell University Press 2003
- Thinking the Poetic Measure of Justice: Heidegger, Hölderlin, Celan, SUNY Press 2013
- Philosophers and their Poets: The Poetic Turn in German Philosophy since Kant, edited with Theodore George, SUNY Press 2019
- Of an Alien Homecoming: Reading Heidegger's "Hölderlin", SUNY Press 2022
