= James C. Risser =

American philosopher

- Born: James Conrad Risser; 1946 (age 79–80)

Education
- Education: Duquesne University (PhD, 1978)
- Thesis: Truth and Aesthetic Experience in Kant's Critique of Judgement (1978)
- Doctoral advisor: John Sallis

Philosophical work
- Era: Contemporary philosophy
- Region: Western philosophy
- School: Continental philosophy Hermeneutics
- Institutions: Seattle University
- Main interests: Aesthetics

James Conrad Risser (born 1946) is an American philosopher and Professor Emeritus of Philosophy at Seattle University where he was Pigott-McCone Endowed Chair of Humanities between 1991 and 1994. He is a former president of the North American Society of Philosophical Hermeneutics (2012–2015). Risser is known for his works on Heideggerian philosophy and hermeneutics.

== Books ==
- (Edited) Philosophy, Art and the Imagination: Essays on the Work of John Sallis. (Leiden: Koninklijke Brill NV, 2022).
- The Life of Understanding: A Contemporary Hermeneutics. (Bloomington: Indiana University Press, 2012)
- (Edited) American Continental Philosophy. Edited by Walter Brogan and James Risser. (Bloomington: Indiana University Press, 2000)
- (Edited) Heidegger Toward the Turn: The Work of the 1930s. (Albany: SUNY Press, 1999)
- Hermeneutics and the Voice of the Other: Re-reading Hans-Georg Gadamer's Philosophical Hermeneutics (Albany: SUNY Press, 1997)
