= Cynthia Nielsen =

American philosopher

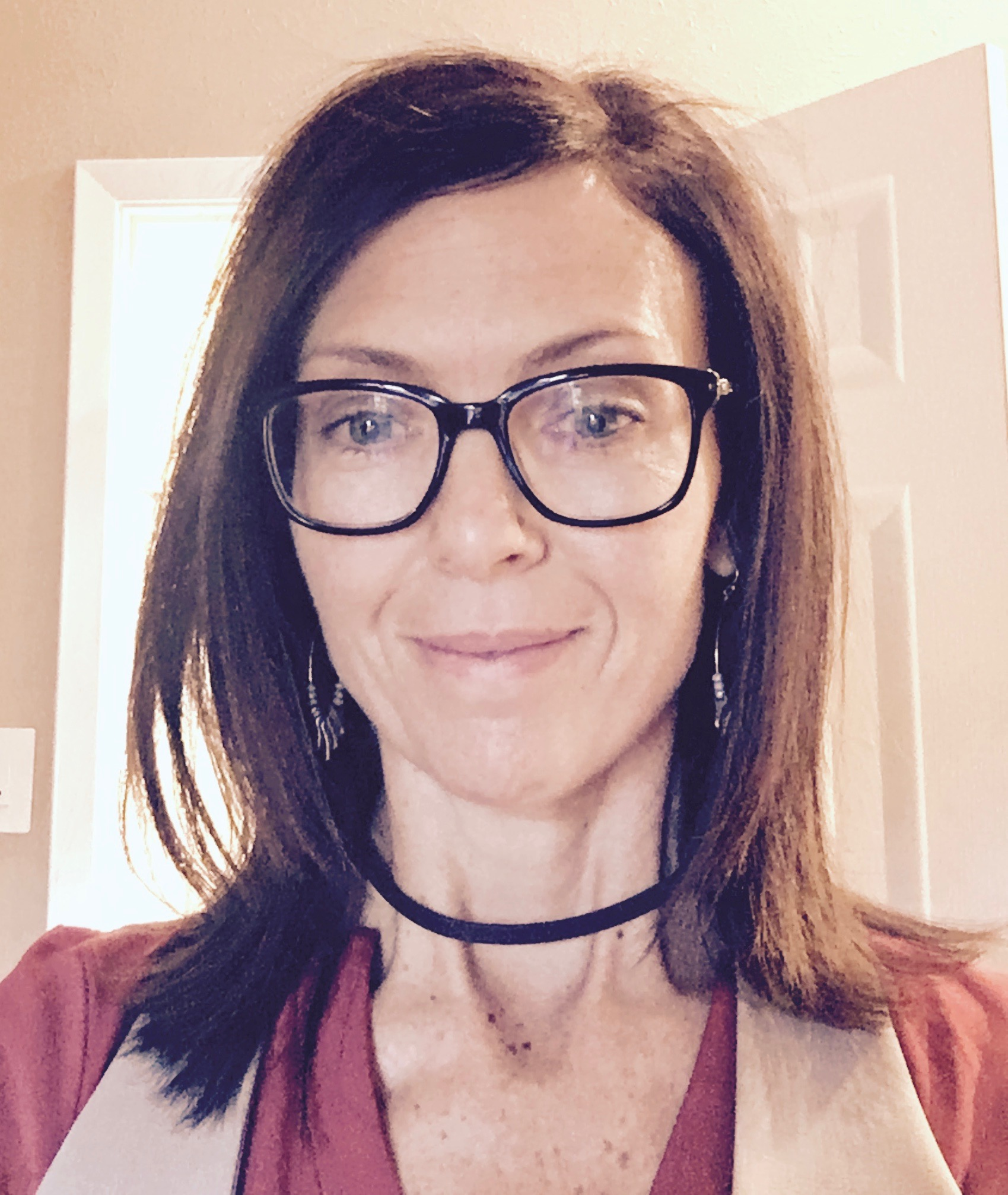
- Born: Cynthia R. Nielsen; 1970 (age 55–56)

Education
- Education: University of North Florida (BMus); University of Dallas (PhD)
- Doctoral advisor: Philipp W. Rosemann

Philosophical work
- Era: Contemporary philosophy
- Region: Western philosophy
- School: Continental
- Institutions: University of Dallas,(2015–present) Villanova (2012–14)
- Doctoral students: John V. James
- Main interests: hermeneutics, Hans-Georg Gadamer, philosophy of art, aesthetics, social and political philosophy, ethics

Cynthia R. Nielsen (born 1970) is an American philosopher and Professor of Philosophy at the University of Dallas. Nielsen's work engages with a wide range of theorists, philosophers, and topics. She is known for her expertise in the field of hermeneutics (focusing especially on Hans-Georg Gadamer), the philosophy of music, aesthetics, ethics, and social philosophy. Since 2015 she has taught at the University of Dallas. Prior to her appointment at the University of Dallas, she taught at Villanova University as a Catherine of Sienna Fellow in the Ethics Program.

== Education ==
Nielsen earned a Bachelor of Music in Jazz Studies at the University of North Florida. She earned her PhD in philosophy at the University of Dallas, where she studied with Philipp Rosemann.

== Career ==
Nielsen was the Catherine of Sienna Teaching Fellow at Villanova University between 2012 and 2014. In 2015, she was appointed as an assistant professor at the University of Dallas, being promoted to associate professor in 2019 and full professor of philosophy in 2022.

== Overview of work ==
Nielsen's early research focused primarily on how subjects, on the one hand, are socially constructed, and on the other, actively resist sociopolitical, economic, cultural, and other forces in order to shape their subjectivities. Her work on Frederick Douglass and Frantz Fanon analyzes how racialized and colonized subjectivities are constructed and highlights how agents employ various strategies in order to resist, reconfigure, and subvert dehumanizing structures, discourses, and practices. Her work on Foucault and Douglass shows how Douglass was cognizant of the disciplinary power at work in Covey's panoptic gaze.

In light of her background and experience as a jazz musician, Nielsen's book, Gadamer's Hermeneutical Aesthetics: Art as a Performative, Dynamic, Communal Event (Routledge, 2023), brings Gadamer's hermeneutics into conversation with the practices of free jazz, Banksy's street art, and African American artist Romare Bearden.

Nielsen's work is interdisciplinary and explores a wide range of cultural, ethical, sociopolitical, and hermeneutical issues. In her review of Nielsen's book, Foucault, Douglass, Fanon, and Scotus in Dialogue, Dr. Renee Harrison, describes Nielsen's work as "a significant interdisciplinary contribution to the fields of philosophy, religion, history, and African American studies". Andrii Hnativ’s review of Ethical and Hermeneutical Reflections on War, Violence, and Responsibility: Listening to Ukrainian Voices highlights both its interdisciplinary character and discusses the book's hermeneutical approach of engaging Ukrainian voices through enacted textual dialogues.

== Selected publications ==
=== Books ===
- Ethical and Heremeutical Reflections on War, Violence, and Responsibility: Listening to Ukrainian Voices, Routledge, 2026.
- Gadamer's Hermeneutical Aesthetics: Art as a Performative, Dynamic, Communal Event, New York: Routledge, 2023.
- Gadamer's Truth and Method: A Polyphonic Commentary, co-edited with Greg Lynch, New York: Rowman & Littlefield, 2022.
- Interstitial Soundings. Philosophical Reflections on Improvisation, Practice, and Self-Making, Eugene, OR: Cascade Books, 2015.
- Foucault, Douglass, Fanon, and Scotus in Dialogue: On Social Construction and Freedom, New York: Palgrave Macmillan, 2013.
