= Peter Trawny =

German philosopher (born 1964)

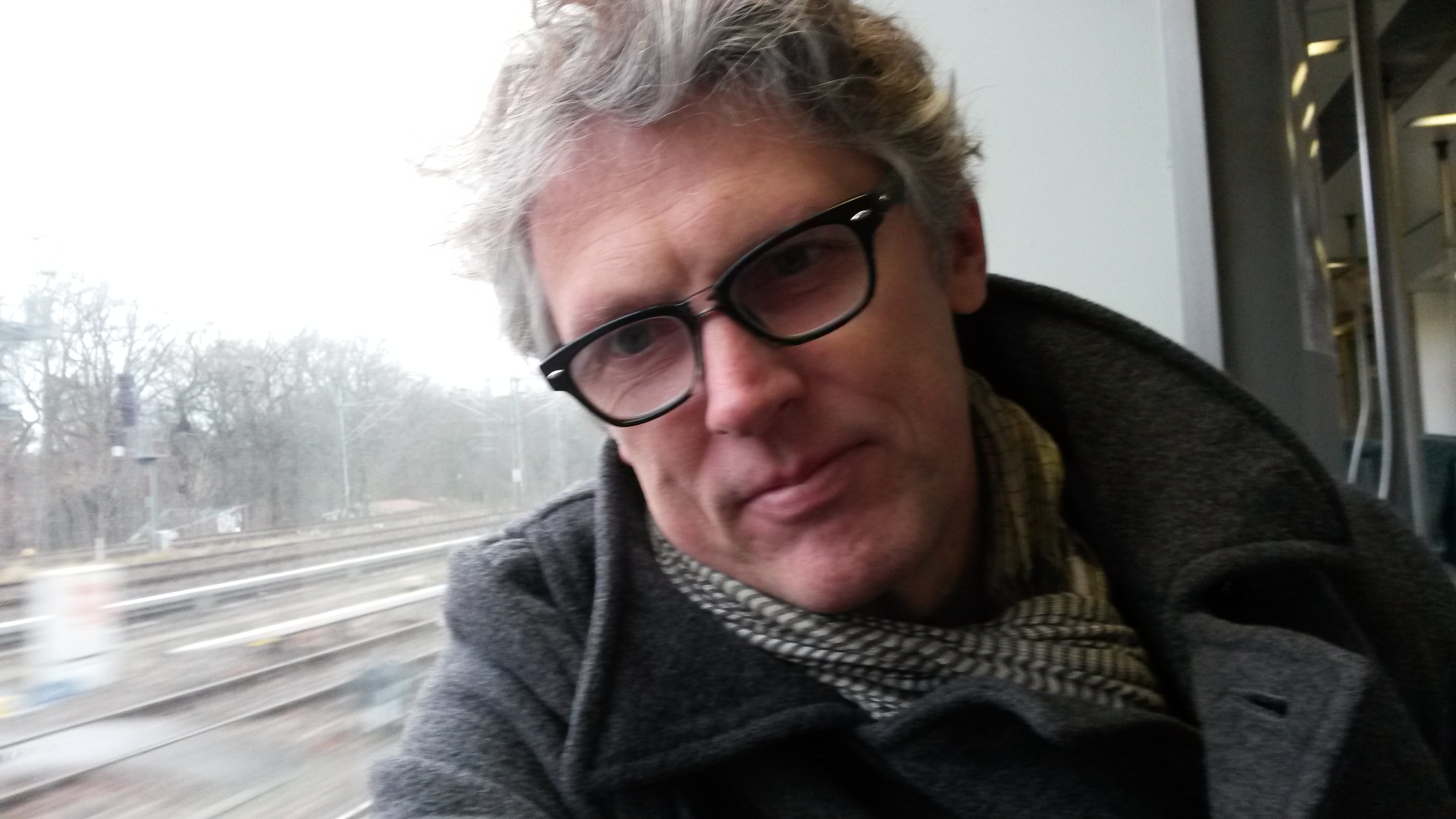
Trawny in 2015

Peter Trawny (born December 17, 1964, in Gelsenkirchen) is a German philosopher and professor at the University of Wuppertal.

== Life ==
Peter Trawny studied philosophy, musicology and art history at the Ruhr University Bochum, where he the Magisterium graduated in 1992, after a guest stay at the Albert Ludwigs University in Freiburg in Breisgau and at the University of Basel. In 1995, he received his doctorate under Klaus Held with a dissertation on Martin Heidegger's phenomenology of the world. With a doctoral scholarship from the Study Foundation of the German people, he was promoted and awarded in 1997 with the Second Prize of all faculties of the University of Wuppertal. This was followed by a two-month stay at the University of Kyoto in Japan with a grant from the Japan Society for the Promotion of Science. Starting in 1997, Trawny was a research assistant at the University of Wuppertal in Klaus Held's department of phenomenology.

In 2000 he completed his habilitation at the University of Wuppertal on "the Time of the Trinity: Investigations of the Trinity in Hegel and Schelling." After his habilitation, Trawny worked from 2001 to 2003 in the philosophy department of the Albert Ludwigs University in Freiburg, as part of a sponsorship from the Fritz Thyssen Foundation. In 2005, the German Literature Archive in Marbach on Neckar granted Trawny a full scholarship and honored him in 2006 with the Ernst Jünger grant from the State of Baden-Wuerttemberg. In the same year he was appointed associate professor of philosophy at the University of Wuppertal. In 2009 Trawny was awarded a W3 professorship at the University of Wuppertal for aesthetics and philosophy of culture. In 2011 he assumed a deputy professor position at the Södertörns Högskola in Stockholm at the Center for Baltic and East European Studies. In 2012 Trawny founded the Martin Heidegger Institut in German at the Bergische Universität in Wuppertal, for whose support he would win, among others, the legacy of Heidegger.

In addition to his international lecturing and research, Trawny taught as a visiting professor at several international universities such as the University of Vienna, the Tongji University in Shanghai or Södertörns Högskola in Stockholm at the Center for Baltic and East European Studies.

== Scientific work ==
Trawny's approach to philosophical problems uses a phenomenological-hermeneutic method. The focus of his work are questions of political philosophy, ethics, art and media philosophy, as well as questions of art and literature.

In his most recent works, Trawny focuses the elaboration of a philosophical understanding of globalization and cosmopolitanism, especially in his books Adyton and Medium and Revolution. Trawny tries to interpret the globalization of their strained relationship with the media and thus comes to a determination of the medium as "the immaterial unity of technology and capital". On the basis of Heidegger's event thinking, Trawny tries to map Marxist revolutionary discourse onto the historical-contextual conditions of the 21st Century, thus intertwining its designation of the medium, the questions of political philosophy and media art philosophy.

In addition to his research and teaching, Trawny is consistently involved in the scholarly edition of Martin Heidegger's collected works.

== Selected works ==
=== Own publications ===
- Martin Heidegger's phenomenology of the world, Karl Alber Verlag, Freiburg / Munich 1997 ISBN 978-3-49547-865-3
- The time of the Trinity. Studies on the Trinity in Hegel and Schelling, Königshausen & / Neumann, Würzburg 2002 ISBN 978-3-82602-370-5
- Martin Heidegger. Introduction, Campus Verlag, Frankfurt and New York, 2003 ISBN 978-3-59337-359-1
- Heidegger and Hölderlin or the European morning, King & Neumann, Würzburg 2004 ISBN 978-3-82602-631-7
- Conceivable Holocaust. The political ethics Hannah Arendt, King & Neumann, Würzburg 2005 ISBN 978-3-82603-082-6
- Socrates or The Birth of Political Philosophy, King & Neumann, Würzburg 2007 ISBN 978-3-82603-625-5
- The authority of the witness. Ernst Jünger's political work, Matthes & Seitz, Berlin 2009 ISBN 978-3-88221-643-1
- "Adyton". Heidegger esoteric philosophy, Matthes and Seitz, Berlin 2010 ISBN 978-3-88221-662-2
- Medium and Revolution, Matthes and Seitz, Berlin 2011 ISBN 978-3-88221-574-8
- Written into the water, Matthes and Seitz, Berlin 2013 ISBN 978-3-88221-045-3

=== Editions in the context of Martin Heidegger Complete Edition ===
- Martin Heidegger: The Story of Being. 1 The history of Being. 2 Koinon. From the history of Being. Complete Edition Vol 69 Vittorio Klostermann, Frankfurt am Main 1998 ISBN 978-3-465-02979-3
- Martin Heidegger: On Ernst Jünger. Complete Edition Vol 90 Verlag Vittorio Klostermann. Frankfurt am Main 2004 ISBN 978-3-465-03325-7
- Martin Heidegger: Seminars Hegel – Schelling. Complete Edition Vol 86 Verlag Vittorio Klostermann. Frankfurt 2011 ISBN 978-3-465-03682-1
- Martin Heidegger: The beginning of Western philosophy (Anaximander and Parmenides). Complete Edition Vol 35 Verlag Vittorio Klostermann. Frankfurt 2012 ISBN 978-3-465-03726-2

=== Articles (selection) ===
- From the love. Comments on a poetic phenomenology with Rainer Maria Rilke. In: Phenomenological Research. New Series 1–2. Half-band. 1996, 221–238
- On the Relationship between heart and reason in the thought of Kant and Hegel. Comments on a metaphor. In: Kant-Studien 89 Vintage. 1998, 318–334
- The Future of Time: Reflections on the conception of Time in Hegel and Heidegger. In: Research in Phenomenology. Vol XXX. Edited by John Sallis. 2000, 12–39
- Avis aux Barbares! «Ces barbares qui tout calculent ...". Heidegger – de l'Allemagne à l'Europe. In: L'Infini 95 2006, 66–93
- Understanding and judgments. Hannah Arendt's interpretation of Kant's "judgment" as a political and ethical hermeneutics. In: Journal of Philosophical Research. Volume 60 Issue 2 2006, 269–289
- Modernism as a world war. The war in Heidegger and Patocka. In: Studia Phaenomenologica Vol VII (The Phenomenology Of Jan Patocka). 2007, 376–394
- The trauma of the Holocaust as the beginning of philosophy. According to Hannah Arendt and Emmanuel Levinas. In: Journal of Genocide Research. 2007. No. 2, 118–132
- The ideal of the wise. On the relationship between philosophy and philosopher in Kant In: Kant-Studien. 99 Vintage. Issue 4 (2008), 456–476
- "What is Germany '" – Ernst Jünger importance for Martin Heidegger position to Nazism. In: Heidegger Yearbook 5 2009, 209–234
- Article »Martin Heidegger," In: The German philosophy in the 20th Century. An author manual. Edited by Thomas Bedorf and Andreas Gelhard. WBG: Darmstadt 2012
