= Daniela Vallega-Neu =

German philosopher

- Born: 1966 (age 59–60)
- Awards: New Faculty Award, NEH summer stipend, DAAD Fellowship

Education
- Education: Albert Ludwigs Universitat Freiburg (PhD)
- Thesis: Die Notwendigkeit der Gründung im Zeitalter der Dekonstruktion. Zur Gründung in Heideggers 'Beiträgen zur Philosophie'; unter Hinzuziehung der Derridaschen Dekonstruktion (1995)
- Doctoral advisor: Friedrich-Wilhelm von Herrmann

Philosophical work
- Era: 21st-century philosophy
- Region: Western philosophy
- School: Continental philosophy
- Institutions: University of Oregon
- Main interests: Phenomenology, Hermeneutics, Deconstruction

Daniela Vallega-Neu (born 1966) is a German philosopher and Professor of Philosophy at the University of Oregon. She is known for her expertise on hermeneutics, deconstruction and Heidegger's thought.

== Books ==
- Heidegger’s Poietic Writings: From Contributions to Philosophy to The Event, Indiana University Press, 2018
- The Bodily Dimension in Thinking, SUNY Press, 2005
- Heidegger’s ‘Contributions to Philosophy.’ An Introduction, Indiana University Press, 2003
- Die Notwendigkeit der Gründung im Zeitalter der Dekonstruktion: Zur Gründung in Heideggers 'Beiträgen zur Philosophie'; unter Hinzuziehung der Derridaschen Dekonstruktion, Duncker & Humblot, 1997

== See also ==
- Contributions to Philosophy
