= Always already =

Philosophical term

In philosophy, always already (German: immer schon) describes the perception of phenomena by the mind of an observer. The features of a phenomenon that seem to precede any perception of it are said to be "always already" present.

== Development ==
Always already literally translates the German phrase immer schon that appears prominently in several 20th-century philosophical works, notably Martin Heidegger's Being and Time. The phrase is not specific to philosophy in German, but refers to an action or condition that has continued without any identifiable beginning. Heidegger used the phrase routinely to indicate that Dasein, the human experience of existence, has no beginning that is separate from the world in which one exists, but is produced in it and by it.

Heidegger's influence allowed French and subsequent English thinkers to accept the phrase's literal translation. Writing from the Marxist tradition, Louis Althusser observed that "individuals are always-already subjects" within an ideological structure before they perceive themselves as such – indeed, even before birth. During the late 20th century the term spread into various areas of philosophical discourse that include literary theory, hermeneutics and deconstruction.

== See also ==
- A priori and a posteriori
- Hauntology
- Heideggerian terminology
- Noumenon
- Facticity
- Thrownness
