= Ontotheology =

Branch of theology

Ontotheology (German: Ontotheologie) is the ontology of God and/or the theology of being. While the term was first used by Immanuel Kant, it has only come into broader philosophical parlance with the significance it took for Martin Heidegger's later thought. While, for Heidegger, the term is used to critique the whole tradition of 'Western metaphysics', much recent scholarship has sought to question whether 'ontotheology' developed at a certain point in the metaphysical tradition, with many seeking to equate the development of 'ontotheological' thinking with the development of modernity, and Duns Scotus often being cited as the first 'ontotheologian'.

== History and usage of the term ==
=== Kant ===
The term "ontotheology" was coined by Immanuel Kant in contradistinction to the term cosmotheology, "in order to distinguish between two competing types of 'transcendental theology'." The word's origin is often mistakenly attributed to Heidegger, who used it frequently.

At the broadest level Kant had distinguished two general types of theology: that which comes from reason and that of revelation. Within the category of reasoned theology he distinguished two further types, "natural theology" and "transcendental theology". Within natural theology, Kant differentiated between "physico-theology" and an ethical or moral theology. Transcendental theology or reason-based theology, he divided into ontotheology and cosmotheology.

Ontotheology, according to Kant (as interpreted by Iain Thomson), "was the type of transcendental theology characteristic of Anselm of Canterbury's ontological argument which believes it can know the existence of an original being [Urwesen], through mere concepts, without the help of any experience whatsoever". Kant himself defined the relationship between ontotheology and cosmotheology as follows: "Transcendental theology aims either at inferring the existence of a Supreme Being from a general experience, without any closer reference to the world to which this experience belongs, and in this case it is called cosmotheology; or it endeavours to cognize the existence of such a being, through mere conceptions, without the aid of experience, and is then termed ontotheology."

Kant thus distinguishes between rationally-oriented (ontotheological) and empirically-oriented (cosmotheological) discussion. Consistently with Kant's definition, philosophical and theological writers sometimes use the words "ontotheology" or "ontotheological" to refer to the metaphysical or theological views characteristic of many rationalist philosophers. Heidegger, discussed below, later argued for a broader definition of the word ontotheology.

=== Heidegger ===
For Martin Heidegger, ontotheology took on quite a different meaning; for him, ontotheology is fundamentally the same as all metaphysics of presence. This he argues in Being and Time, his later essay on "The End of Metaphysics", in his Introduction of 1949 to his Was ist Metaphysik?, and in his most systematic treatment of the problem of ontotheology, Identity and Difference, (1957).

For Heidegger, ontotheology contributes to the oblivion or forgetfulness of Being. Indeed, "metaphysics is onto-theo-logy," and Western metaphysics, since the beginning with the Greeks, has eminently been both ontology and theology." The problem with this intermixing of ontology and theology, according to Heidegger's analysis, and the reason why Heidegger and his successors sought to overcome it, is at least twofold.

First, by linking the philosophical with the theological, and vice versa, the distinctiveness of each respective discourse is clouded over. As such, the nature of philosophy as a factually unknown and structurally unknowable path of thought is restricted by an economy of faith. Likewise, with theology, as the science of faith, theology at its best testifies to the irreducible mystery of its source in revelation and to the unapproachable and incomprehensible aim of its desire in God. However, once theology becomes onto-theological, that mysterious source and incomprehensible aim are reduced to the order of beings. Hence, ontotheology is said to undermine both the philosophical and the theological projects.

Second, the ontotheological problem is one aspect of the degeneration of Western thought and the consequent troubles of Western technological culture. Ontotheology contributes to the human desire for mastery by presuming knowledge regarding the "first cause" of philosophy and the "highest being" of theology. The "god of the philosophers" in ontotheology, whom Heidegger referred to as the causa sui ('self-caused') or the ens realissimum ('ultimate reality'), is an idol created by human thought and used for man's own purposes. This is different from the ontotheological structure of the principle that Gottfried Wilhelm Leibniz proposed. Heidegger cited that, in Leibniz's view, God, as the first existing cause of all being, is called reason and "what is to be posited as the ultima ratio of Natura, as the furthest, highest – and that means the first – existing reason for the nature of things, is what one usually calls God."

Heideggerian post-ontotheology does not look for the ultimate unity of the supreme or absolute being, but rather the fundamental dimension of meaning and purpose inherent in being as situated meaningfulness.

Heidegger uses the expanded expression "onto-theo-ego-logical" ("onto-theo-ego-logisch") in his lectures on Hegel in the Winter semester 1930/31 (GA 32:193).

=== Contemporary writers ===
Contemporary scholarship on ontotheology is divided between those who accept Heidegger’s analysis of the problem of ontotheology and continue his efforts at “overcoming ontotheology,” and those who are rethinking Heidegger's view and thus re-imagining the relationship between philosophy and theology and reconfiguring the conditions for philosophical theology.

The latter project takes its cue from Jacques Derrida's observation, "With or without the word being, Heidegger wrote a theology with and without God. He did what he said it would be necessary to avoid doing. He said, wrote, and allowed to be written exactly what he said he wanted to avoid."

Heidegger was careful to claim that his work was philosophical and not theological, and argued that a Christian philosophy or a phenomenological theology was an absurdity likened to a Protestant mathematics. However, Heidegger's sustained and comprehensive critique or "destructuring" of the Western philosophical tradition has theological implications, as Derrida's reading of Heidegger's philosophy revealed.

Seen from this perspective ontotheology is not so much a problem to be overcome as an inevitability of thought that cannot be avoided and that conditions all human inquiry, whether theological or philosophical in nature, or whether religious or secular in orientation. Yet Derrida claims in his essay Différance that différance both exceeds and inscribes ontotheology.

With regard to theology, a number of Christian theologians, such as Brian Ingraffia, Bruce Ellis Benson, Merold Westphal, and Jean-Luc Marion have argued that a genuine biblical theology of revelation escapes the problem of ontotheology by giving priority to a specifically theological language as disclosed through scripture and as passed down through tradition. According to this perspective, the God of the Bible is fundamentally different from the God of philosophy, and thus, while the ontotheological problem sometimes eventuates in the pronouncement of the death of the moral-metaphysical God, this means little or nothing to the biblical portrait of the God of history who inspires and empowers the community of the faithful.

Thus many concepts have been considered to be the ultimate or absolute entity beneath all reality: Form, substance, essence, soul, geist or spirit/mind, extension, God, monads and can also be considered in some way as ontotheological in their reliance upon the metaphysics of presence.

== See also ==
- Actus purus
- Deconstruction
- Destructive phenomenology
- Face-to-face
- Fundamental ontology
- Kehre
