= Existentiell =

Key term in Martin Heidegger's early philosophy

"Existentiell" and "existential" are key terms in Martin Heidegger's early philosophy. Existentiell refers to the aspects of the world which are identifiable as particular delimited questions or issues, whereas existential refers to Being as such, which permeates all things, so to speak, and can not be delimited in such a way as to be susceptible to factual knowledge. In general it can be said that "existentiell" refers to a "what", a materially describable reality, whereas "existential" refers to structures inherent in any possible world. In other words, the term "existentiell" refers to an ontic determination, whereas "existential" refers to an ontological determination.

== Etymology ==
Heidegger did not coin the term "existentiell". The common German adjective "existenziell" is usually translated into English as "existential". However, Heidegger coined the German noun "Existenzial", giving it a meaning distinct from the common German word "existenziell". In English translations of Heidegger, then, the German "existenziell" is transliterated as "existentiell" in English, and the German word "Existenzial" is transliterated as "existential", each word having its own technical meaning specific to Heidegger.

== Definition ==
An existentiell understanding is an ontic understanding or characterization of existence, whereas an existential understanding is an ontological one. Nevertheless, the two terms are related in that an ontic determination is inherently ontological. In Heidegger's terminology, the being-there of the world (Dasein) cannot be essentially defined "by ascribing to it a 'what' that specifies its material content”. The ontological or existential thus have priority over the ontic and the existentiell. In fact, the essence of Dasein directly evokes the question of Being, and likewise "what is primarily interrogated in the question of the meaning of being is that being which has the character of Da-sein.”. This means that, for any particular being or area of study, "the ontological analysis of this being always requires a previous glimpse of existentiality.” Nevertheless, Dasein can relate to it in an ontic-existentiell or in an ontological-existential manner.

The second relation regards the “theoretical transparency of the ontological structure of existence ... [and] aims at the analysis of what constitutes existence”. Its understanding is rather existential: “Because these explications are defined in terms of existentiality, we shall call the characteristics of being of Da-sein existentials. They are to be sharply delimited from the determinations of being of those beings unlike Da-sein which we call categories.”. The above understanding is limited to Dasein alone due to its qualitative distinction from other beings. It cannot be used to describe an ontic understanding of beings in the world nor it addresses the facts about things in the context of the world. They are limited to Dasein and Dasein alone. It should be kept in mind that “Existentials and categories are the two fundamental possibilities of the characteristics of being. The being which corresponds to them requires different ways of primary interrogation. Beings are a who (existence) or else a what (objective presence in the broadest sense).”

== Relation ==
Being and Time notes that "the roots of the existential analysis, for their part, are ultimately existentiell -they are ontic". This means that an existential analysis derives its directives from an existentiell and it is itself grounded in an existentiell character of Dasein.

== See also ==
- Existentialism
- Ontology
- Phenomenology
- Heideggerian terminology
