= Authenticity (philosophy) =

Concept in existential psychology and philosophy

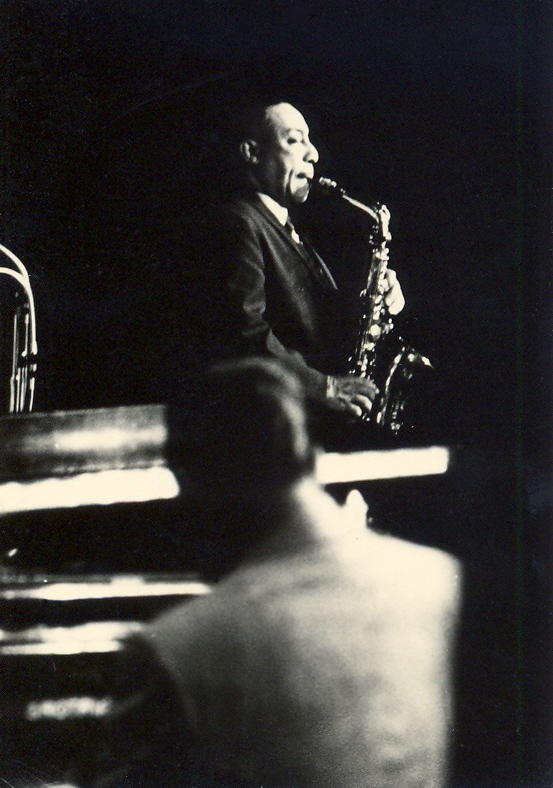
Artistic authenticity: The saxophonist Johnny Hodges at work, playing jazz. The philosopher Jean-Paul Sartre associated jazz with artistic freedom and improvisation, interpreting it as an expression of existential self-creation.

Authenticity is a concept of personality in the fields of psychology, existential psychotherapy, existentialist philosophy, and aesthetics. In existentialism, authenticity is the degree to which a person takes ownership of their choices and identity, acting in recognition of their freedom and responsibility, rather than deferring that responsibility to social roles, norms, or external authorities. The conscious self comes to terms with the condition of Geworfenheit, of having been thrown into an absurd world (without values and meaning) not of their own making, thereby encountering external forces and influences different from and other than the Self. Authenticity has emerged as a central concept in contemporary models of well-being and the good life, serving as a foundational principle in many leading psychological frameworks. A person’s lack of authenticity is considered bad faith in dealing with other people and with one's self; thus, authenticity is in the instruction of the Oracle of Delphi: “Know thyself.” Concerning authenticity in art, the philosophers Jean-Paul Sartre and Theodor Adorno held opposing views and opinions about jazz, a genre of American music; Sartre said that jazz is authentic and Adorno said that jazz is inauthentic. Many musical subcultures require artistic authenticity, lest the community consider an artist to be a poseur for lacking authenticity (creative, musical, or personal); artistic authenticity is integral to many genres of music, including but not limited to genres of rock (such as punk rock and heavy metal), club music (such as house and techno), and hip-hop.

In the late 18th and early 19th centuries, Romantic thinkers emphasized intuition, emotion, and a return to nature as responses to Enlightenment rationalism, anticipating later philosophical concerns with authenticity and individual self-expression. In the 20th century, Anglo–American preoccupations with authenticity centered on the writings of existentialist philosophers whose native tongue is not English; therefore, the faithful, true, and accurate translation of the term existentialism was much debated, to which end the philosopher Walter Kaufmann assembled a canon of existentialist philosophers. Kaufmann's canon includes the Dane Søren Kierkegaard (1813–1855), the German Martin Heidegger (1889–1976), and the Frenchman Jean-Paul Sartre (1905–1980). For these existentialists, the conscious Self comes to terms with existence (being and living) in an absurd, materialist world featuring external forces, e.g. Geworfenheit (Thrown-ness), and intellectual influences different from and other than the Self.

Personal authenticity is exhibited in how a person acts and changes in response to the external world's influences upon the Self. Among artists, authenticity in art describes a work of art faithful to the artist's values. In the field of psychology, authenticity identifies a person living life in accordance with their true Self and personal values rather than according to the external demands of society, such as social conventions, kinship, and duty.

To identify, describe, and define authenticity, existential philosophers like Kierkegaard, Nietzsche, and Martin Heidegger investigated the existential and ontological significance of the social constructs that compose the norms of society. For a journalist, not blindly accepting social norms contributes to producing intellectually authentic reportage, achieved by the reporter choosing to be true to their professional ethics and personal values. Yet, in the praxis of journalism, the reporter’s authenticity (professional and personal) is continually contradicted by the business requirements of corporate publishing.

== Existential perspectives ==
=== Søren Kierkegaard ===
According to Søren Kierkegaard, personal authenticity depends upon inwardness and the individual’s subjective relationship to truth, particularly in matters of faith. Kierkegaard criticizes the conformity of “the crowd” and the levelling effects of modern society, arguing that individuals often lose themselves in public opinion rather than taking responsibility for their own existence. In Practice in Christianity (1850), he emphasizes that authentic faith requires the individual to stand alone before God, accepting the risks and responsibilities of personal commitment rather than relying on social convention or institutional religion. He writes:

Therefore, it is a risk to preach, for as I go up into that holy place — whether the church is packed or as good as empty, whether I, myself, am aware of it or not, I have one listener more than can be seen, an invisible listener, God in heaven, whom I certainly cannot see, but who truly can see me.... Truly, it is a risk to preach! Most people, no doubt, have the idea that stepping out on the stage as an actor to venture into the danger of having all eyes focused on one requires courage. Yet, in one sense, this danger, like everything on the stage, is an illusion because the actor, of course, is personally outside it all; his task is precisely to deceive, to dissemble, to represent someone else, and to reproduce, accurately, someone else’s words. On the other hand, the proclaimer of Christian truth steps forward into a place where, even if the eyes of all are not focused on him, the eye of an omniscient one is. His task is: to be himself, and in a setting, God’s house, which, all eyes and ears, requires only one thing of him — that he should be himself, be true. That he should be accurate, that is, that he, himself, should be what he proclaims [to be], or at least strive to be that, or at least be honest enough to confess, about himself, that he is not that.... How risky it is to be the I who preaches, the one speaking, an I who, by preaching and as he preaches, commits himself unconditionally, displays his life so that, if possible, one could look directly into his soul — to be this I, that is risky!

— Søren Kierkegaard, Practice in Christianity (1850) pp. 234–235

=== Friedrich Nietzsche ===
Personal authenticity can be achieved—without religion, which requires accepting pre-determined virtues (eternal valuations) as unquestionably true. In living authentically, a person elevates himself/herself above the mass culture to transcend the limits of conventional morality, thereby personally determining what is and what is not good and bad, without the pre-determined virtues of conformity “on account of which we hold our grandfathers in esteem”. An authentic life is achieved by avoiding the “herding animal morality”. To “stand alone [is to be] strong and original enough to initiate opposite estimates of value, to transvaluate and invert ‘eternal valuations’”. Common to the existential perspectives of Kierkegaard and Nietzsche are “the responsibilities they place on the individual to take an active part in the shaping of one’s beliefs, and then to be willing to act on that belief”.

=== Jean-Paul Sartre ===
It is difficult to describe authenticity intelligibly. One possibility is to describe instead the negative space surrounding the condition of being inauthentic by giving examples. To that end, the novels of Jean-Paul Sartre make authenticity conceptually intelligible through the stories of anti-heroic characters, people who base their actions upon external, psychological pressures — such as the social pressure to appear to be a certain kind of person; the pressure to adopt a given way of life; and the pressure to prostitute personal integrity (moral values and aesthetic standards) in exchange for the comfort (physical, mental, and moral) of social conformity. The novelist Sartre explains existential philosophy through characters who do not understand their reasoning for acting as they do—people who ignore crucial facts about their own lives to avoid learning about being an inauthentic person with an identity defined from outside the self.

Absolute freedom is the vertiginous experience necessary for being authentic, yet such freedom can be so unpleasant as to impel people to choose an inauthentic life. As an aspect of authenticity, absolute freedom determines a person’s relation with the real world, a relation not based upon or determined by a system of values or an ideology. In this manner, authenticity is connected with creativity, and the will to act must be born of the actor. In that vein, Heidegger speaks of absolute freedom as modes of living determined by personal choice. Sartre identified, described, and explained what is an inauthentic existence, not to define what is an authentic mode of living.

=== Erich Fromm ===
Erich Fromm proposed a very different definition of authenticity in the mid-twentieth century. He considered behavior of any kind, even that wholly in accord with societal mores, to be authentic if it results from personal understanding and approval of its drives and origins, rather than merely from conformity with the received wisdom of the society. Thus, a Frommean authentic may behave consistently in accord with cultural norms, if those norms appear on consideration to be appropriate, rather than simply in the interest of conforming with current norms. Fromm thus considers authenticity to be a positive outcome of enlightened and informed motivation, rather than a negative outcome of rejection of the expectations of others. He described the latter condition – the drive primarily to escape external restraints typified by the "absolute freedom" of Sartre – as "the illusion of individuality", as opposed to the genuine individuality that results from authentic living.

== Authenticity paradox ==
The authenticity paradox describes the difficulty to be authentic in social media environment. Users experience a constant tension between projecting their own personal values and the social expectations to share popular values. Popular values are predominantly commercial and users often engage in "social media rituals," such as taking countless photos and carefully curating images of their commercial experiences. This process turns genuine personal experiences into a form of advertisement, leading to a focus on projecting an image that might be perceived as authentic rather than truly expressing authentic values.

Ultimately, the authenticity paradox highlights the loss of self in a mediated world driven by commercial needs. While people desperately seek authenticity, they struggle to find it because their behavior is often driven by the need to advertise popular brands and gain social recognition. This environment, where existence is increasingly determined by the visibility of information produced, makes individuals fixate on their image, risking the loss of their genuine identities.

== Musical subculture ==
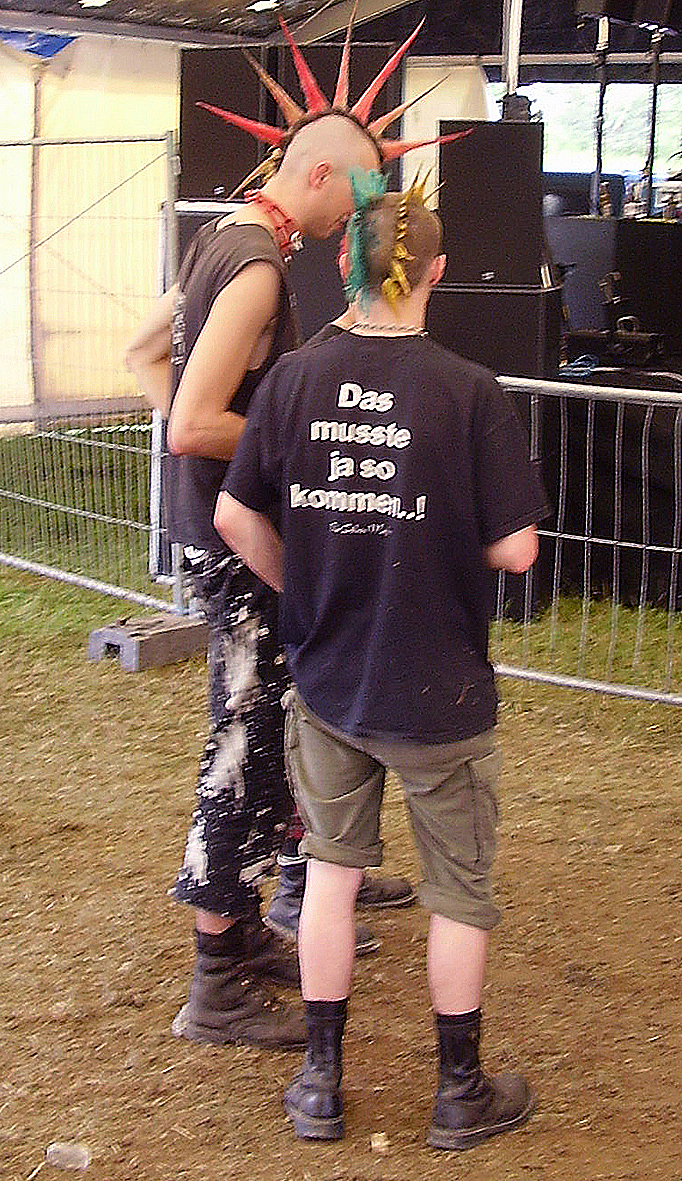
The punk rock subculture dismisses and excludes poseurs deemed not to understand, abide, or live the value system of the subculture.

Some genres of rock music, especially the subcultures of punk and heavy metal, require a great deal of artistic authenticity from its musicians and fans and criticize and exclude musicians, composers, and bands they assess as being poseurs — insufficiently authentic or inauthentic as artists. A poseur is an artist or a musical band who copies the dress, the style of speech, and the manners of the subculture, yet is excluded for not understanding the artistic philosophy, not understanding the sociology, and not understanding the value system of the subculture; talking the talk, without walking the walk.

The authenticity of an artist has three bases: (I) long-term dedication to the music scene; (II) historical knowledge of the subculture; and (III) personal integrity (inner voice) for correct artistic choices. At one extreme of the heavy-metal genre, exists the subgenre of black metal whose adherents value above all else, artistic authenticity, emotional sincerity, and extremity of expression. Black metal artists emphatically profess that black metal performances are not for entertainment or spectacle, but rather that the extreme expression of such performances, are ritual expression, achieved through transcendence of the body and the self. In light of such systems of moral value in the arts, a working-class band, by accepting a formal recording contract, might appear to be sell outs within the heavy metal and punk rock communities. The academic Deena Weinstein said that “The code of authenticity, which is central to the heavy metal subculture, is demonstrated in many ways”, such as by clothing, an emotional singing voice, and thematic substance to the songs.

In contemporary mainstream pop music, perceptions of raw personal authenticity, vulnerability, and a confessional lyric style are central to the commercial and chart success of female singer-songwriters. Their direct connection with fans via social media can bypass traditional music industry gatekeepers, contributing to this phenomenon.

== Criticism ==
The philosopher Jacob Golomb argues that existential authenticity is a way of life incompatible with a system of moral values that comprehends all persons.

The philosopher Slavoj Žižek also sees an "irreducible gap" between "overcoming one's false Self" ("subjective authenticity") and assuming an ethical stance. For Žižek, the neutrality and pursuit of "inner peace" involved in the "extreme" version of the authenticity of the Self (exemplified for him by Zen Buddhism) pose an obstacle to "full" political engagement and social responsibility. Žižek denies "a deep affinity" between this "Buddhist" approach and Heidegger (the philosopher who developed the notion of authenticity) by pointing to the concept of the "appropriating Event" (Ereignis) that historicises Being (and, according to Michael E. Zimmerman, supplants authenticity) in Heidegger's writings from the late 1930s. Žižek regards Heidegger's Nazi political commitment as a "right step in the wrong direction", even if the Nazi "revolution" was a "pseudo-Event". Žižek also insists on the value of theoretical insight: siding with Jacques Lacan, he criticises Heidegger's philosophy for dismissing the notion of the subject with its Cartesian legacy. He defends "the unity of philosophy and the existential position in actual life" in Heidegger's Jewish teacher Edmund Husserl's original method of phenomenological reduction from Heidegger's own privileging of existence over consciousness.

== See also ==
- Akrasia – Lack of self-control
- Authentic leadership – Leadership theory and research construct
- Authentic self – Psychological concepts often used in connection with narcissism
- Being-in-itself – Philosophical concept
- Alessandro Ferrara – Italian philosopher (born 1953)
- Honesty – Moral quality of truthfulness
- Individuation – How a thing is identified as distinct from other things
- Integrity – Moral virtue and practice
- Invented tradition – Recently invented cultural practices perceived as old
- Persona (psychology) – Social face an individual presents to the world
- Ressentiment – Concept in existentialism
- Self-deception – Psychology of false perceptions and their impact on human behavior
