= Apophantic =

Specific type of declaratory statement

In logic, Apophantic (Greek: ἀποφαντικός, "declaratory", from ἀποφαίνειν apophainein, "to show, to make known") statements are declaratory statements whose truth-value can be determined by examining whether its predicate can be logically attributed to its subject.

For example, consider the two sentences "All penguins are birds" and "All bachelors are unhappy". In the first sentence, the set of all birds is a category which penguins can or cannot necessarily be placed into. In the second sentence, "unhappy" is not a category that all bachelors must necessarily be placed into; it is contingent on the happiness of the individual bachelors. However, because no penguins need to be consulted or examined to determine that all penguins are birds, the conclusion that the first statement must be true is apophantic.

The term "apophantic" first appeared in the works of Aristotle. The concept appears in the Arabic Aristotelian tradition as jâzim. In phenomenology, Edmund Husserl considered apophantic judgment central to his 'transcendental logic', but his student Martin Heidegger argued later that apophantic judgements are the least reliable means of obtaining truth because they are cut from the original interpretive framework of relations to the subject.

== See also ==
- Analytic–synthetic distinction – Semantic distinction in philosophy
- Diairesis – Epistemology classification method
- Heideggerian terminology – Overview of neological terms coined by the 20th-century German philosopher
