= Facticity =

Philosophical concept with multiple meanings

In philosophy, facticity (French: facticité; German: Faktizität) has multiple meanings—from "factuality" and "contingency" to the intractable conditions of human existence.

== Early usage ==
The abstract philosophical term Facticität (later Faktizität) is credited to Johann Gottlieb Fichte (who used it in his 1801 Darstellung der Wissenschaftslehre) and has a variety of meanings. It can refer to facts and factuality, as in nineteenth-century positivism, but comes to mean that which resists explanation and interpretation in Wilhelm Dilthey and Neo-Kantianism. The Neo-Kantians contrasted facticity with ideality, as does Jürgen Habermas in his 1992 book Between Facts and Norms (Faktizität und Geltung).

== Heidegger ==
German philosopher Martin Heidegger (Being and Time, 1927) discusses "facticity" as the "thrownness" (Geworfenheit) of individual existence, which is to say individuals are "thrown into the world". By this, he does not only refer to a brute fact, or the factuality of a concrete historical situation, e.g. "born in the '80s". Facticity is something that already informs and has been taken up in existence, even if it is unnoticed or left unattended. As such, facticity is not something individuals come across and directly behold. In moods, for example, facticity has an enigmatic appearance, which involves both turning toward and away from it. For Heidegger, moods are conditions of thinking and willing to which they must in some way respond. The thrownness of human existence (or Dasein) is accordingly disclosed through moods.

== Sartre and de Beauvoir ==
In the mid-20th century works of French existentialists Jean-Paul Sartre (Being and Nothingness, 1943) and Simone de Beauvoir (The Ethics of Ambiguity, 1947), facticity signifies all of the concrete details against the background of which human freedom exists and is limited. For example, these may include the time and place of birth, a language, an environment, an individual's previous choices, as well as the inevitable prospect of their death. For example: currently, the situation of a person who is born without legs precludes their freedom to walk on the beach; if future medicine were to develop a method of growing new legs for that person, their facticity might no longer exclude this activity.

== Recent usage ==
Facticity is a term that takes on a more specialized meaning in 20th-century continental philosophy, especially in phenomenology/existentialism and critical theory, including Edmund Husserl, Martin Heidegger, Jean-Paul Sartre, Maurice Merleau-Ponty and Theodor Adorno. Recent philosophers such as Giorgio Agamben, Jean-Luc Nancy, Byung-Chul Han and François Raffoul have taken up the notion of facticity in new ways.

Facticity plays a key part in Quentin Meillassoux's philosophical project to challenge the thought-world relationship of correlationism. Meillassoux defines it as "the absence of reason for any reality; in other words, the impossibility of providing an ultimate ground for the existence of any being."

== See also ==
- Being for itself
- Sartrean terminology
