= Fundamental ontology =

Philosophical concept by Martin Heidegger

In Being and Time, the philosopher Martin Heidegger makes the distinction between ontical and ontological, or between beings and being as such. He labeled this the "ontological difference." It is from this distinction that he develops the concept of fundamental ontology (German: Fundamentalontologie).

The history of ontology in Western philosophy is, in Heidegger's terms, ontical, whereas ontology ought to designate fundamental ontology. He says this "ontological inquiry" is required to understand the basis of the sciences.

== Ontological difference ==
Traditional ontology asks "Why is there anything?", whereas Heidegger's fundamental ontology asks, "What does it mean for something to be?", writes Taylor Carman (2003). Carman elaborates: Heidegger's fundamental ontology is relevant to traditional ontology in that it concerns "What any understanding of entities necessarily presupposes, namely, our understanding of that in virtue of which entities are entities?"

This ontological difference (German: ontologische Differenz) is central to Heidegger's philosophy. In his 1937 "Contributions to Philosophy" Heidegger described it as "the essence of Dasein," where "Dasein" refers to a being (such as the human) for whom the meaning of being is itself an issue. He accuses the Western philosophical tradition of incorrectly focusing on the "ontic" –and thus forgetful of this distinction. This has led to the mistake of understanding being (as such) as a kind of ultimate entity, for example as idea, energeia, substantia, or will to power.

According to Richard Rorty, Heidegger envisioned no "hidden power of Being" as an ultimate entity. Heidegger tries to rectify ontic philosophy by focusing instead on the meaning of being, that is, fundamental ontology. This "ontological inquiry" is required to understand the basis of the sciences, according to Being and Time (1927).

Fundamental ontology is the result of Heidegger's decision to reinterpret phenomenology, as developed earlier by his mentor Edmund Husserl. According to Heidegger, the phenomenological project required new terminology and a redefinition of traditional concepts. For instance, the thesis that a phenomenon is the essence of a thing could not be articulated solely with traditional concepts and terms. In fact, Heidegger consistently refused to use these concepts in their Husserlian senses.

Moreover, Heidegger went on to separate his fundamental ontology from previous ontologies. Heidegger wrote that clarifying the meaning of being is required for the basis of all fields of science. For Heidegger, the ontical forms of research conducted by scientists presuppose the fundamental-ontological. As he expresses it:

The question of Being aims… at ascertaining the a priori conditions not only for the possibility of the sciences which examine beings as beings of such and such a type, and, in doing so, already operate with an understanding of Being, but also for the possibility of those ontologies themselves which are prior to the ontical sciences and which provide their foundations. Basically, all ontology, no matter how rich and firmly compacted a system of categories it has at its disposal, remains blind and perverted from its ownmost aim, if it has not first adequately clarified the meaning of Being, and conceived this clarification as its fundamental task.

In Husserl's definition, "phenomenon" appeared comprehensive and sufficient for his philosophical ventures. But Heidegger saw room for new development. By shifting the priority from consciousness (psychology) to existence (ontology), Heidegger opened a new direction for phenomenological inquiry.

== See also ==
- Foundation ontology
- Kehre
- Meta-ontology
- Ontotheology
