= Heideggerian terminology =

Overview of terms coined by the 20th-century German philosopher

Martin Heidegger, the 20th-century German philosopher, produced a large body of work that intended a profound change of direction for philosophy. Such was the depth of change that he found it necessary to introduce many neologisms, often connected to idiomatic words and phrases in the German language.

== Terms ==
=== Aletheia ===
(Ancient Greek: ἀλήθεια)

Heidegger's idea of aletheia, or disclosure (Erschlossenheit), was an attempt to make sense of how things in the world appear to human beings as part of an opening in intelligibility, as "unclosedness" or "unconcealedness". (This is Heidegger's usual reading of aletheia as Unverborgenheit, "unconcealment".) It is closely related to the notion of world disclosure, the way in which things get their sense as part of a holistically structured, pre-interpreted background of meaning. Initially, Heidegger wanted aletheia to stand for a re-interpreted definition of truth. However, he later corrected the association of aletheia with truth.

=== Apophantic ===
(German: apophantisch)

An assertion (as opposed to a question, a doubt or a more expressive sense) is apophantic. It is a statement that covers up meaning and instead gives something present-at-hand. For instance, "The President is on vacation", and, "Salt is Sodium Chloride" are sentences that, because of their apophantic character, can easily be picked up and repeated in news and gossip by 'The They.' However, the real ready-to-hand meaning and context may be lost.

=== Being-in-the-world ===
(German: In-der-Welt-sein)

Being-in-the-world is Heidegger's replacement for terms such as subject, object, consciousness, and world. For him, the split of things into subject/object, as is found in the Western tradition and even in language, must be overcome, as is indicated by the root structure of Husserl and Brentano's concept of intentionality, i.e., that all consciousness is consciousness of something, that there is no consciousness, as such, cut off from an object (be it the matter of a thought or of a perception). Nor are there objects without some consciousness beholding or being involved with them.

At the most basic level of "being-in-the-world," Heidegger notes that there is always a mood (Stimmung), a mood that "assails us" in humanity's unreflecting devotion to the world. A mood comes neither from the "outside" nor from the "inside", but arises from being-in-the-world. A person may turn away from a mood but that is only to another mood, as part of facticity. Only with a mood is someone permitted to encounter things in the world. Dasein (a co-term for being-in-the-world) has an openness to the world that is constituted by the attunement of a mood or state of mind. As such, Dasein is a "thrown" "projection" (geworfener Entwurf), projecting itself onto the possibilities that lie before it or may be hidden, and interpreting and understanding the world in terms of possibilities. Such projecting has nothing to do with comporting oneself toward a plan that has been thought out. It is not a plan, since Dasein has, as Dasein, already projected itself. Dasein always understands itself in terms of possibilities. As projecting, the understanding of Dasein is its possibilities as possibilities. One can take up the possibilities of "The They" self and merely follow along or make some more authentic understanding.

=== Being-toward-death ===
(German: Sein-zum-Tode)

Being-toward-death is not an orientation that brings Dasein closer to its end, in terms of clinical death, but is rather a way of being. Being-toward-death refers to a process of growing through the world where a certain foresight guides the Dasein towards gaining an authentic perspective. It is provided by dread of death. In the analysis of time, it is revealed as a threefold condition of Being. Time, the present, and the notion of the "eternal", are modes of temporality, which is the way humanity views time. For Heidegger, it is very different from the mistaken view of time as being a linear series of past, present and future. Instead he sees it as being an ecstasy, an outside-of-itself, of futural projections (possibilities) and one's place in history as a part of one's generation. Possibilities, then, are integral to understanding of time; projects, or thrown projection in-the-world, are what absorb and direct people. Futurity, as a direction toward the future that always contains the past—the has-been—is a primary mode of Dasein's temporality.

Death is that possibility which is the absolute impossibility of Dasein. As such, it cannot be compared to any other kind of ending or "running out" of something. For example, one's death is not an empirical event. For Heidegger, death is Dasein's ownmost (it is what illuminates Dasein in its individuality), it is non-relational (nobody can take one's death away from one, or die in one's place, and we can not understand our own death through the death of other Dasein), and it is not to be outstripped. The "not-yet" of life is always already a part of Dasein: "as soon as man comes to life, he is at once old enough to die." The threefold condition of death is thus simultaneously one's "ownmost potentiality-for-being, non-relational, and not to be out-stripped". Death is determinate in its inevitability, but an authentic Being-toward-death understands the indeterminate nature of one's own inevitable death—one never knows when or how it is going to come. However, this indeterminacy does not put death in some distant, futural "not-yet"; authentic Being-toward-death understands one's individual death as always already a part of one.

With average, everyday (normal) discussion of death, all this is concealed. The "they-self" talks about it in a fugitive manner, passes it off as something that occurs at some time but is not yet "present-at-hand" as an actuality, and hides its character as one's ownmost possibility, presenting it as belonging to no one in particular. It becomes devalued—redefined as a neutral and mundane aspect of existence that merits no authentic consideration. "One dies" is interpreted as a fact, and comes to mean "nobody dies".

On the other hand, authenticity takes Dasein out of the "They", in part by revealing its place as a part of the They. Heidegger states that Authentic being-toward-death calls Dasein's individual self out of its "they-self", and frees it to re-evaluate life from the standpoint of finitude. In so doing, Dasein opens itself up for "angst", translated alternately as "dread" or as "anxiety". Angst, as opposed to fear, does not have any distinct object for its dread; it is rather anxious in the face of Being-in-the-world in general—that is, it is anxious in the face of Dasein's own self. Angst is a shocking individuation of Dasein, when it realizes that it is not at home in the world, or when it comes face to face with its own "uncanny" (German Unheimlich, "not homelike"). In Dasein's individuation, it is open to hearing the "call of conscience" (German Gewissensruf), which comes from Dasein's own Self when it wants to be its Self. This Self is then open to truth, understood as unconcealment (Greek aletheia). In this moment of vision, Dasein understands what is hidden as well as hiddenness itself, indicating Heidegger's regular uniting of opposites; in this case, truth and untruth.

=== Being-with ===
(German: Mitsein)

The term "Being-with" refers to an ontological characteristic of the human being, that it is always already (Note: By "always already" Heidegger means that every phenomenological inspection of the human being finds this characteristic. It is not founded on something else.) with others of its kind. This assertion is to be understood not as a factual statement about an individual, that they are at the moment in spatial proximity to one or more other individuals, but rather a statement about the being of every human, that in the structures of its being-in-the-world one finds an implicit reference to other humans, as one could not live without others. Humans have been called (by others, not by Heidegger) "ultrasocial" and "obligatorily gregarious". Heidegger, from his phenomenological perspective, calls this feature of human life "Being-with" (Mitsein), and says it is essential to being human, classifying it as inauthentic when a person fails to recognize how much, and in what ways, someone thinks of themself, and how they habitually behave as influenced by our social surroundings. Heidegger classifies it as authentic when someone pays attention to that influence and decides independently whether to go along with it or not. Living entirely without such influence, however, is not an option in the Heideggerian view.

=== Care (or concern) ===
(German: Sorge)

A fundamental basis of being-in-the-world is, for Heidegger, not matter or spirit but care:

Dasein's facticity is such that its Being-in-the-world has always dispersed itself or even split itself up into definite ways of Being-in. The multiplicity of these is indicated by the following examples: having to do with something, producing something, attending to something and looking after it, making use of something, giving something up and letting it go, undertaking, accomplishing, evincing, interrogating, considering, discussing, determining....

All these ways of Being-in have concern (Sorge, care) as their kind of Being. Just as the scientist might investigate or search and presume neutrality, it can be seen that beneath this there is the mood, the concern of the scientist to discover, to reveal new ideas or theories and to attempt to level off temporal aspects.

=== Clearing ===
(German: Lichtung)

In German, the word Lichtung means a clearing, as in, for example, a clearing in the woods. Since its root is the German word for light (Licht), it is sometimes also translated as "lighting", and in Heidegger's work it refers to the necessity of a clearing in which anything at all can appear, the clearing in which some thing or idea can show itself, or be unconcealed. Note the relation that this has to aletheia and disclosure.

Beings (Seiende, plural: Seienden), but not Being itself (Sein), stand out as if in a clearing, or physically, as if in a space. Thus, Hubert Dreyfus writes, "things show up in the light of our understanding of being." Thus the clearing makes possible the disclosure of beings (Seienden), and also access to Dasein's own being. The clearing is not, itself, an entity that can be known directly, in the sense in which we know about the entities of the world. As Heidegger writes in On the Origin of the Work of Art:

In the midst of being as a whole an open place occurs. There is a clearing, a lighting. Thought of in reference to what is, to beings, this clearing is in a greater degree than are beings. This open center is therefore not surrounded by what is; rather, the lighting center itself encircles all that is, like the Nothing which we scarcely know. That which is can only be, as a being, if it stands within and stands out within what is lighted in this clearing. Only this clearing grants and guarantees to us humans a passage to those beings that we ourselves are not, and access to the being that we ourselves are.

=== Destruktion ===
Founded in the work of Martin Luther, Heidegger conceptualises philosophy as the task of destroying ontological concepts, including ordinary everyday meanings of words like time, history, being, theory, death, mind, body, matter, logic etc.:

When tradition thus becomes master, it does so in such a way that what it 'transmits' is made so inaccessible, proximally and for the most part, that it rather becomes concealed. Tradition takes what has come down to us and delivers it over to self-evidence; it blocks our access to those primordial 'sources' from which the categories and concepts handed down to us have been in part quite genuinely drawn. Indeed it makes us forget that they have had such an origin, and makes us suppose that the necessity of going back to these sources is something which we need not even understand. (Being and Time, p. 43)

Heidegger considers that tradition can become calcified here and there:

If the question of Being is to have its own history made transparent, then this hardened tradition must be loosened up, and the concealments which it has brought about dissolved. We understand this task as one in which by taking the question of Being as our clue we are to destroy the traditional content of ancient ontology until we arrive at those primordial experiences in which we achieved our first ways of determining the nature of Being—the ways which have guided us ever since. (Being and Time, p. 44)

Heidegger then remarks on the positivity of his project of Destruktion:

...it has nothing to do with a vicious relativizing of ontological standpoints. But this destruction is just as far from having the negative sense of shaking off the ontological tradition. We must, on the contrary, stake out the positive possibilities of that tradition, and this means keeping it within its limits; and these in turn are given factically in the way the question is formulated at the time, and in the way the possible field for investigation is thus bounded off. On its negative side, this destruction does not relate itself toward the past; its criticism is aimed at 'today' and at the prevalent way of treating the history of ontology... But to bury the past in nullity (Nichtigkeit) is not the purpose of this destruction; its aim is positive; its negative function remains unexpressed and indirect. (Being and Time, p. 44)

=== Dasein ===
In his effort to redefine man, Heidegger introduces a statement: 'the ownmost of Dasein consists in its existence'. Heidegger conceptualises existence around the unique qualities of man, which he considers "its own being is an issue for it". In the Heideggerian view, man defines its own being through its actions and choices, and is able to choose amongst possibilities, actualizing at least one of the possibilities available while closing off others in the process. This grasping of only some possibilities defines man as one kind of self rather than another: a dishonest choice defines a person as dishonest, fixing broken windows defines a person as a glazier, and so on. These choices are made continually and on a daily basis, and so man is able to define itself as it moves along. Therefore, living the life of a person is a matter of constantly taking a stand on one's sense of self, and one's sense of self being defined by taking that stand. As no choice is 'once and for all', man has to continually keep on choosing for his sense of self.

Added to this is that the being of everything else on the planet poses an issue for man, as humanity deals with things as what they are and persons as who they are. Only persons, for example, relate to others as meaningful and fitting meaningfully into and with other things and/or activities. Only man, being that is in the manner of existence, can encounter another entity in its instrumental character. Again, 'to be an issue' means to be concerned about something and to care for something. In other words, being of Dasein as existence is so constituted that in its very being it has a caring relationship to its own being. This relationship is not a theoretical or self-reflective one, but rather a pre-theoretical one which Heidegger calls a relation or comportment of understanding. Dasein understands itself in its own being, or Dasein is in the manner that its being is always disclosed to it. It is this disclosure of being that differentiates Dasein from all other beings. This manner of being of Dasein to which it relates or comports itself is called 'existence'. Further, it is essential to have a clear understanding of the term 'ownmost'. It is the English rendering of the German wesen, usually translated as 'essence' (the 'whatness'). The verbal form of the German term wesen comes closer to the Indian root vasati, which means dwelling, living, growing, maturing, moving etc. Thus, this verbal dynamic character implied in the word wesen is to be kept in mind to understand the nuance of the Heideggerian usage of 'existence'. If traditionally wesen had been translated as essence in the sense of 'whatness', for Heidegger such a translation is unfit to understand what is uniquely human. Heidegger takes the form of existence from the Latin word ex-sistere (to stand out of itself) with an indication of the unique characteristic of the being of man in terms of a dynamic 'how' as against the traditional conception in terms of 'whatness'. Hence existence for Heidegger means how Dasein in its very way of being is always outside itself in a relationship of relating, caring, as opposed to a relationship of cognitive understanding to other innerworldly beings. Thereby, it is to differentiate strictly what is ownmost to Dasein from that of other modes of beings; Heidegger uses the term 'existence' for the being of man. For what is ownmost to other modes of beings, he uses the term 'present-at-hand'.

The various elements of existence are called 'existentials' and those of what is present-at-hand are called the 'categories'. According to Heidegger, "man alone exists; all other things are (they don't exist)". It is important to understand that this notion of 'existence' as what is ownmost to man is not a static concept to be defined once and for all in terms of a content, but has to be understood in terms of something that is to be enacted that varies from individual to individual and from time to time, unlike other beings that have a fixed essence. That being whose ownmost is in the manner of existence is called Dasein. In German, da has a spatial connotation of either being 'there' or 'here'. Dasein thus can mean simply "being there or here". In German, it could also refer to the existence (as opposed to the essence) of something, especially that of man. However, Heidegger invests this term with a new ontological meaning. The German term Dasein consists of two components: Da and sein. In the Heideggerian usage, the suffix -sein stands for the being of man in the manner of existence and Da- stands for a threefold disclosure. According to Heidegger, the being of man is in the manner of a threefold disclosure. That is, the ontological uniqueness of man consists in the fact that its being becomes the da/sphere, where not only its own being, but the being of other non-human beings as well as the phenomenon of the world is disclosed to Dasein, because of which it can encounter the innerworldly beings in their worlding character. Hence, for Heidegger, the term Dasein is a title for the ontological structure of the ontical human being.

=== Disclosure ===
(German: Erschlossenheit)

Hubert Dreyfus and Charles Spinosa write that: "According to Heidegger our nature is to be world disclosers. That is, by means of our equipment and coordinated practices we human beings open coherent, distinct contexts or worlds in which we perceive, feel, act, and think."

Heidegger scholar Nikolas Kompridis writes: "World disclosure refers, with deliberate ambiguity, to a process which actually occurs at two different levels. At one level, it refers to the disclosure of an already interpreted, symbolically structured world; the world, that is, within which we always already find ourselves. At another level, it refers as much to the disclosure of new horizons of meaning as to the disclosure of previously hidden or unthematized dimensions of meaning."

=== Discourse ===
(German: Rede)

The ontological-existential structure of Dasein consists of "thrownness" (Geworfenheit), "projection" (Entwurf), and "being-along-with"/"engagement" (Sein-bei). These three basic features of existence are inseparably bound to "discourse" (Rede), understood as the deepest unfolding of language.

=== Equipment ===
(German: das Zeug)

Das Zeug refers to an object in the world with which one has meaningful dealings. A nearly untranslatable term, Heidegger's equipment can be thought of as a collective noun, so that it is never appropriate to call something 'an equipment'. Instead, its use often reflects it to mean a tool, or as an "in-order-to" for Dasein. Tools, in this collective sense, and in being ready-to-hand, always exist in a network of other tools and organizations, e.g., the paper is on a desk in a room at a university. It is inappropriate usually to see such equipment on its own or as something present-at-hand.

Another, less prosaic, way of thinking of 'equipment' is as 'stuff one can work with' around us, along with its context. "The paper one can do things with, from the desk, in the university, in the city, on the world, in the universe." 'Equipment' refers to the thing, its possibilities, and its context.

=== Ereignis ===
Ereignis is often translated as "an event", but is better understood in terms of something "coming into view". It comes from the German prefix, er-, comparable to 're-' in English, and äugen, to look. It is a noun coming from a reflexive verb. Note that the German prefix er- also can connote an end or a fatality. A recent translation of the word by Kenneth Maly and Parvis Emad renders the word as "enowning"; that in connection with things that arise and appear, that they are arising 'into their own'. Hubert Dreyfus defined the term as "things coming into themselves by belonging together".

Ereignis appears in Heidegger's later works and is not easily summarized. The most sustained treatment of the theme occurs in the cryptic and difficult Contributions to Philosophy. In the following quotation he associates it with the fundamental idea of concern from Being and Time, the English etymology of con-cern is similar to that of the German:

...we must return to what we call a concern. The word Ereignis (concern) has been lifted from organically developing language. Er-eignen (to concern) means, originally, to distinguish or discern which one's eyes see, and in seeing calling to oneself, ap-propriate. The word con-cern we shall now harness as a theme word in the service of thought.

=== Existence ===
(German: Existenz)

=== Existentiell ===
(German: Existenziell)

=== Fundamental ontology ===
Traditional ontology asks "Why is there anything?", whereas Heidegger's fundamental ontology asks "What does it mean for something to be?". Taylor Carman writes (2003) that Heidegger's "fundamental ontology" is fundamental relative to traditional ontology in that it concerns "what any understanding of entities necessarily presupposes, namely, our understanding of that in virtue of which entities are entities."

=== Gelassenheit ===
Often translated as "releasement", Heidegger's concept of Gelassenheit has been explained as "the spirit of disponibilité [availability] before What-Is which permits us simply to let things be in whatever may be their uncertainty and their mystery." Heidegger elaborated the idea of Gelassenheit in 1959, with a homonymous volume which includes two texts: a 1955 talk entitled simply Gelassenheit, and a 'conversation' (Gespräch) entitled Zur Erörterung der Gelassenheit: Aus einem Feldweggespräch über das Denken ("Towards an Explication of Gelassenheit: From a Conversation on a Country Path about Thinking", or "Toward an Emplacing Discussion [Erörterung] of Releasement [Gelassenheit]: From a Country Path Conversation about Thinking"). An English translation of this text was published in 1966 as "Conversation on a Country Path about Thinking". Heidegger borrowed the term from the Christian mystical tradition, proximately from Meister Eckhart.

=== Gestell ===
Heidegger once again returns to discuss the essence of modern technology to name it Gestell. The original German meaning is something more like scaffolding; he defines it primarily as a sort of (en)framing:

Enframing means the gathering together of that setting-upon that sets upon man, i.e., challenges him forth, to reveal the real, in the mode of ordering, as standing-reserve. Enframing means that way of revealing that holds sway in the essence of modern technology and that it is itself not technological.

Once he has discussed enframing, Heidegger highlights the threat of technology. As he states, this threat "does not come in the first instance from the potentially lethal machines and apparatus of technology." Rather, the threat is the essence because "the rule of enframing threatens man with the possibility that it could be denied to him to enter into a more original revealing and hence to experience the call of a more primal truth." This is because challenging-forth conceals the process of bringing-forth, which means that truth itself is concealed and no longer unrevealed. Unless humanity makes an effort to re-orient itself, it will not be able to find revealing and truth.

It is at this point that Heidegger has encountered a paradox: humanity must be able to navigate the dangerous orientation of enframing because it is in this dangerous orientation that we find the potential to be rescued. To further elaborate on this, Heidegger returns to his discussion of essence. Ultimately, he concludes that "the essence of technology is in a lofty sense ambiguous" and that "such ambiguity points to the mystery of all revealing, i.e., of truth."

=== Geworfenheit ===
Geworfenheit describes man's individual existences as "being thrown" (geworfen) into the world. For William J. Richardson, Heidegger used this single term, "thrown-ness", to "describe [the] two elements of the original situation, There-being's non-mastery of its own origin and its referential dependence on other beings".

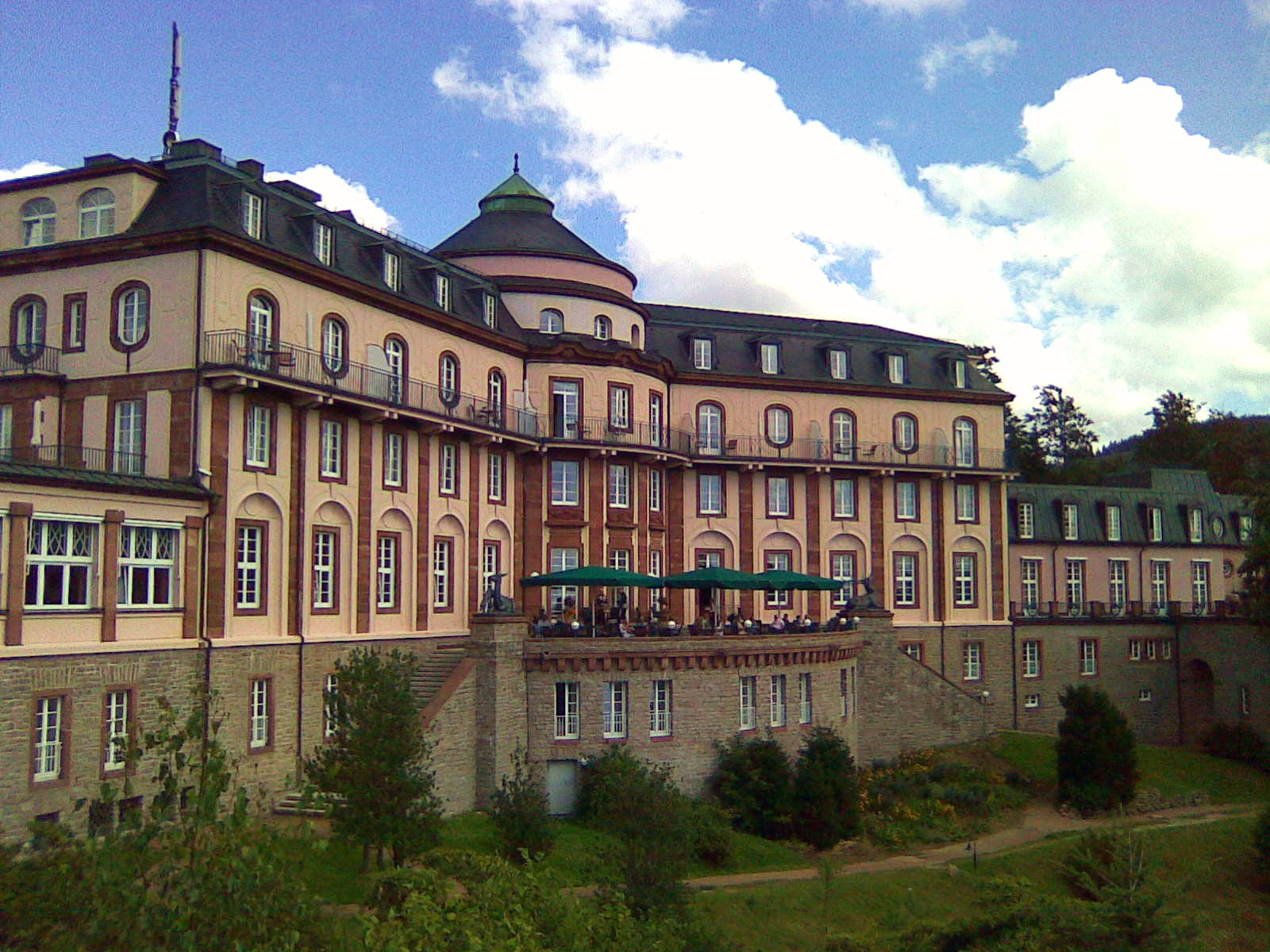
The hotel Bühlerhöhe Castle ("the Bühl Height")

=== Kehre ===
Kehre, or "the turn" (die Kehre) is a term rarely used by Heidegger but employed by commentators who refer to a change in his writings as early as 1930 that became clearly established by the 1940s. Recurring themes that characterize much of the Kehre include poetry and technology. Commentators (e.g. William J. Richardson) describe, variously, a shift of focus, or a major change in outlook.

The 1935 Introduction to Metaphysics "clearly shows the shift" to language from a previous emphasis on Dasein in Being and Time eight years earlier, according to Brian Bard's 1993 essay titled "Heidegger's Reading of Heraclitus". In a 1950 lecture, Heidegger formulated the famous saying "language speaks", later published in the 1959 essays collection Unterwegs zur Sprache, and collected in the 1971 English book Poetry, Language, Thought.

This supposed shift—applied here to cover about thirty years of Heidegger's 40-year writing career—has been described by commentators from widely varied viewpoints; including as a shift in priority from Being and Time to Time and Being—namely, from dwelling (being) in the world to doing (time) in the world. This aspect, in particular the 1951 essay "Building, Dwelling Thinking", influenced several notable architectural theorists, including Christian Norberg-Schulz, Dalibor Vesely, Joseph Rykwert, and Daniel Libeskind.

Other interpreters believe "the Kehre" does not exist or is overstated in its significance. Thomas Sheehan (2001) believes this supposed change is "far less dramatic than usually suggested", and entailed a change in focus and method. Sheehan contends that throughout his career, Heidegger never focused on "being", but rather tried to define "[that which] brings about being as a givenness of entities". Mark Wrathall argued (2011) that the Kehre is not found in Heidegger's writings but is simply a misconception. As evidence for this view, Wrathall sees a consistency of purpose in Heidegger's life-long pursuit and refinement of his notion of "unconcealment".

Among the notable works dating after 1930 are On the Essence of Truth (1930), Contributions to Philosophy (From Enowning), composed in the years 1936–38 but not published until 1989, Building Dwelling Thinking (1951), The Origin of the Work of Art (1950), What Is Called Thinking? (1954) and The Question Concerning Technology (1954). Also during this period, Heidegger wrote extensively on Nietzsche and the poet Hölderlin.

=== Metontology ===
(German: Metontologie)

Metontology is a neologism Heidegger introduced in his 1928 lecture course "Metaphysical Foundations of Logic" ("Metaphysische Anfangsgründe der Logik im Ausgang von Leibniz"). The term refers to the ontic sphere of human experience. While ontology deals with the entire world in broad and abstract terms, metontology concerns concrete topics; Heidegger offers the examples of sexual differences and ethics.

=== Ontic ===
(German: ontisch)

Heidegger uses the term ontic, often in contrast to the term ontological, when he gives descriptive characteristics of a particular thing and the "plain facts" of its existence. What is ontic is what makes something what it is.

For an individual discussing the nature of "being", one's ontic could refer to the physical, factual elements that produce and/or underlie one's own reality –the physical brain and its substructures. Moralists raise the question of a moral ontic when discussing whether there exists an external, objective, independent source or wellspring for morality that transcends culture and time.

=== Ontological ===
(German: ontologisch)

As opposed to "ontic" (ontisch), ontological is used when the nature, or meaningful structure of existence is at issue. Ontology, a discipline of philosophy, focuses on the formal study of Being. Thus, something that is ontological is concerned with understanding and investigating Being, the ground of Being, or the concept of Being itself.

For an individual discussing the nature of "being", the ontological could refer to one's own first-person, subjective, phenomenological experience of being.

=== Ontological difference ===
(German: ontologische Differenz)

Central to Heidegger's philosophy is the difference between being as such and specific entities. He calls this the "ontological difference", and accuses the Western tradition in philosophy of being forgetful of this distinction, which has led to misunderstanding "being as such" as a distinct entity. (See reification)

=== Possibility ===
(German: Möglichkeit)

Möglichkeit is a term used only once in a particular edition of Being and Time. In the text, the term appears to denote "the possibility whose probability it is solely to be possible". At least, if it were used in context, this is the only plausible definition.

=== Present-at-hand ===
(German: vorhanden, Vorhandenheit)

With the present-at-hand one has (in contrast to "ready-to-hand") an attitude like that of a scientist or theorist, of merely looking at or observing something. In seeing an entity as present-at-hand, the beholder is concerned only with the bare facts of a thing or a concept, as they are present and in order to theorize about it. This way of seeing is disinterested in the concern it may hold for Dasein, its history or usefulness. This attitude is often described as existing in neutral space without any particular mood or subjectivity. However, for Heidegger, it is not completely disinterested or neutral. It has a mood, and is part of the metaphysics of presence that tends to level all things down. Through his writings, Heidegger sets out to accomplish the Destruktion (see above) of this metaphysics of presence.

Present-at-hand is not the way things in the world are usually encountered, and it is only revealed as a deficient or secondary mode, e.g., when a hammer breaks it loses its usefulness and appears as merely there, present-at-hand. When a thing is revealed as present-at-hand, it stands apart from any useful set of equipment but soon loses this mode of being present-at-hand and becomes something, for example, that must be repaired or replaced.

=== Projection ===
(German: Entwurf)

The human in its present time has existence which is designed by understanding of future possibilities for the self not only realized, based on the self's thoughts of its ability to realize. From the fact that all understanding is projective so meaning in the world (totality of beings) is an sich (in itself / themselves) wholly and only a project representation. The world is "nothing but" a projection of the human characteristic of dasein without which the world would not exist.

=== Ready-to-hand ===
(German: Griffbereit, zuhanden, zuhandenheit)

In almost all cases humanity is involved in the world in an ordinary, and more involved, way, undertaking tasks with a view to achieving something. Take, for example, a hammer: it is ready-to-hand; we use it without theorizing. In fact, if we were to look at it as present-at-hand, we might easily make a mistake. Only when it breaks, or something goes wrong, might we see the hammer as present-at-hand, just lying there. Even then, however, it may not be fully present-at-hand, as it is now showing itself as something to be repaired or disposed of, and therefore a part of the totality of our involvements. In this case, its Being may be seen as unreadiness-to-hand. Heidegger outlines three manners of unreadiness-to-hand: Conspicuous (damaged; e.g., a lamp's wiring has broken), Obtrusive (a part is missing which is required for the entity to function; e.g., we find the bulb is missing), Obstinate (when the entity is a hindrance to us in pursuing a project; e.g., the lamp blocks my view of the computer screen).

Importantly, the ready-to-hand only emerges from the prior attitude in which we care about what is going on and we see the hammer in a context or world of equipment that is handy or remote, and that is there "in order to" do something. In this sense, the ready-to-hand is primordial compared to that of the present-at-hand. The term primordial here does not imply something Primitive, but rather refers to Heidegger's idea that Being can only be understood through what is everyday and "close" to us. Our everyday understanding of the world is necessarily a part of any kind of scientific or theoretical studies of entities—the present-at-hand—might be. Only by studying our "average-everyday" understanding of the world, as it is expressed in the totality of our relationships to the ready-to-hand entities of the world, can we lay appropriate bases for specific scientific investigations into specific entities within the world.

For Heidegger in Being and Time this illustrates, in a very practical way, the way the present-at-hand, as a present in a "now" or a present eternally (as, for example, a scientific law or a Platonic Form), has come to dominate intellectual thought, especially since the Enlightenment. To understand the question of being, one must be careful not to fall into this leveling off, or forgetfulness of being, that has come to assail Western thought since Socrates; see the metaphysics of presence.

=== Resoluteness ===
(German: Entschlossenheit)

Resoluteness refers to one's ability to "unclose" one's framework of intelligibility (i.e., to make sense of one's words and actions in terms of one's life as a whole), and the ability to be receptive to the "call of conscience".

=== Seinsvergessenheit ===
Seinsvergessenheit is translated variously as "forgetting of being" or "oblivion of being". A closely related term is Seinsverlassenheit, translated as "abandonment of being". Heidegger believed that a pervasive nihilism in the modern world stems from Seinsverlassenheit. The "ontological difference," the distinction between being (Sein) and beings (das Seiende), is fundamental for Heidegger. The forgetfulness of being that, according to him, occurs in the course of Western philosophy amounts to the oblivion of this distinction.

=== The One / the They ===
(German: Das Man, meaning "they-self")

One of the most interesting and important 'concepts' in Being and Time is that of Das Man, for which there is no exact English translation; different translations and commentators use different conventions. It is often translated as "the They" or "People" or "Anyone" but is more accurately translated as "One" (as in "'one' should always arrive on time"). Jan Patočka denoted for the concept Das Man a synonymous designation "public anonymous". Das Man derives from the impersonal singular pronoun man ('one', as distinct from 'I', or 'you', or 'he', or 'she', or 'they'). Both the German man and the English 'one' are neutral or indeterminate in respect of gender and, even, in a sense, of number, though both words suggest an unspecified, unspecifiable, indeterminate plurality. The semantic role of the word man in German is nearly identical to that of the word one in English.

Heidegger refers to this concept of the One in explaining inauthentic modes of existence, in which Dasein, instead of truly choosing to do something, does it only because "That is what one does" or "That is what people do". Thus, das Man is not a proper or measurable entity, but rather an amorphous part of social reality that functions effectively in the manner that it does through this intangibility.

Das Man constitutes a possibility of Dasein's Being, and so das Man cannot be said to be any particular someone. Rather, the existence of 'the They' is known to us through, for example, linguistic conventions and social norms. Heidegger states that, "The 'they' prescribes one's state-of-mind, and determines what and how one 'sees'."

To give examples: when one makes an appeal to what is commonly known, one says "one does not do such a thing"; When one sits in a car or bus or reads a newspaper, one is participating in the world of 'the They'. This is a feature of 'the They' as it functions in society, an authority that has no particular source. In a non-moral sense, Heidegger contrasts "the authentic self" ("my owned self") with "the they self" ("my un-owned self").

A related concept to this is that of the apophantic assertion.

=== World ===
(German: Welt)

Heidegger gives us four ways of using the term "world" Welt:

1. "World" is used as an ontical concept, and signifies the totality or aggregate (Inwood) of things (entities) which can be present-at-hand within the world.

2. "World" functions as an ontological term, and signifies the Being of those things we have just mentioned. And indeed 'world' can become a term for any realm which encompasses a multiplicity of entities: for instance, when one talks of the 'world' of a mathematician, 'world' signifies the realm of possible objects of mathematics.

3. "World" can be understood in another ontical sense—not, however, as those entities which Dasein essentially is not and which can be encountered within-the-world, but rather as the wherein a factical Dasein as such can be said to 'live'. "World" has here a pre-ontological existentiell signification. Here again there are different possibilities: "world" may stand for the 'public' we-world, or one's 'own' closest (domestic) environment.

4. "World" designates the ontologico-existential concept of worldhood (Weltheit). Worldhood itself may have as its modes whatever structural wholes any special 'worlds' may have at the time; but it embraces in itself the a priori character of worldhood in general.

5. "World" designates the revealing dimension of intelligibility in Heidegger's philosophy, contrasted with "earth", the concealing dimension that both sustains and resists the disclosure of a meaningful world.

Note that it is the third definition that Heidegger normally uses.

== See also ==
- Being in itself
- Continental philosophy
- Existentialism
- Hermeneutic circle
- Orthotes
- Sartrean terminology
- Sigetik
- Sous rature
