= Transcendental theology =

"Transcendental theology" (German: Transzendentaltheologie) is a term coined by Immanuel Kant to describe a method of discerning theological concepts. Kant divided transcendental theology into "ontotheology" and cosmotheology, both of which he also invented, "in order to distinguish between two competing types of 'transcendental theology'".

Kant defined the relationship between ontotheology and cosmotheology as follows:

"Transcendental theology aims either at inferring the existence of a Supreme Being from a general experience, without any closer reference to the world to which this experience belongs, and in this case it is called cosmotheology; or it endeavours to cognize the existence of such a being, through mere conceptions, without the aid of experience, and is then termed ontotheology."

A critique of transcendental theology as developed by Kant is that it is argued that human reason is not capable of proving God's existence; Kant solves this problem by appealing to moral symbolism. Thus, Kant describes God as a moral trinity: holy lawgiver, good governor, and just judge.

== See also ==
- Natural theology – Theology reliant on rational and empirical arguments
