= Contributions to Philosophy =

Work by Martin Heidegger

- Cover of the German edition
- Author: Martin Heidegger
- Original title: Beiträge zur Philosophie (Vom Ereignis)
- Translator: 1999: Parvis Emad and Kenneth Maly; 2012: Richard Rojcewicz and Daniela Vallega-Neu
- Language: German
- Subject: Philosophy
- Published: 1989 (in German); 1999: Indiana University Press; 2012: Indiana University Press
- Publication place: Germany
- Preceded by: Introduction to Metaphysics (Heidegger)
- Followed by: Hölderlin's Hymn "The Ister"

Contributions to Philosophy (Of the Event) (German: Beiträge zur Philosophie (Vom Ereignis)) is a work by German philosopher Martin Heidegger. Composed privately between 1936 and 1938, but not available to the public until it was published in Germany in 1989, the work is thought to reflect "the turn" (die Kehre) in Heidegger's thought after Being and Time (1927). It may be considered Heidegger’s second major work. However, it has been noted that there is far less consensus about this book than nearly any other piece of 20th-century philosophy.

Contributions lays the ground for Heidegger's later thought by attempting a more originary approach to the question of being. This involves shifting from the phenomenological analysis of Dasein found in Being and Time to a meditation on beyng (das Seyn) itself as the "event of appropriation" (das Ereignis). By thinking from being out of the event of appropriation, Heidegger turns his attention toward the historical, disclosive character of being, i.e., its unconcealment and withdrawal (aletheia).

== Background ==
Following his resignation as rector of the University of Freiburg in 1934, Heidegger wrote these reflections from 1936-1938 without the intention for their publication. These sketches are a response to the misinterpretations of Being and Time that failed to grasp the question of the meaning of being.

== Composition ==
The structure of Contributions is drastically different from a traditional systematic work. Heidegger calls its composition a "jointure" (Ge-fuge) that is composed of a “Preview,” a final part called “Beyng,” and six joinings named "The Resonating", "The Interplay", "The Leap", "The Grounding", "The Future Ones", and "The Last God". For Heidegger, these six joinings structure the relations of his beyng-historical thinking (seyngeschichtliches Denken), and, according to Daniela Vallega-Neu, “do not present a systematic progression from one topic to the next in which one step would be the condition for the next. Rather, each joining addresses the whole jointure of Contributions, each joining addresses the same, but in a different way.” The text contains 281 sections that range from cryptic fragments to polished passages.

== Summary ==
The text understands itself as preparing the transition from the "first" to the "other beginning" of Western history, which involves the overcoming of metaphysics and "the abandonment of being". The abandonment of being names “not only a personal experience but an epochal occurrence concerning Western history which Heidegger, like Nietzsche, finds rooted in ancient Greece and whose dominance unfolds in Christianity and is consolidated in modernity.” The "first beginning" of Western history commences in ancient Greece with the arising of metaphysics and ends with Nietzsche, whom Heidegger thinks completes its possibilities. The crossing from the first beginning to the other involves shifting manners away from representational styles of thinking to beyng-historical thinking, where beyng is experienced as the event of appropriation, i.e., a unique happening where the emergence and presencing of things becomes granted.

== Reception ==
Richard Polt describes Contributions as a “dissonant symphony that imperfectly weaves together its moments into a vast fugue, under the leitmotif of appropriation. This fugue is seeded with possibilities that are waiting for us, its listeners, to develop them. Some are dead ends—viruses that can lead only to a monolithic, monotonous misunderstanding of history. Others are embryonic insights that promise to deepen our thought, and perhaps our lives, if we find the right way to make them our own.” According to Polt, the book often attacks Nazi ideology, and "absolves Heidegger of any charges that he was an uncritical supporter of Nazism until the bitter end."

Reiner Schürmann's posthumous magnum opus Broken Hegemonies and Miguel de Beistegui's Truth and Genesis both provide readings of Contributions as a part of their larger projects.

While Richard Capobianco thinks Contributions deserves the attention it has received in recent years, he also believes Heidegger scholarship has tended to "overstate the significance of this one text—and to overstate, in particular, the significance of the term Ereignis in his thinking as a whole."
