= Michael Wheeler (philosopher) =

British philosopher (born 1960)

- Born: Michael William Wheeler; November 5, 1960 (age 65)

Academic background
- Education: University of Sussex
- Thesis: The Philosophy of Situated Activity (1996)
- Doctoral advisor: Maggie Boden

Academic work
- Era: Contemporary philosophy
- Region: Western philosophy
- School or tradition: Continental philosophy
- Institutions: University of Stirling
- Main interests: Philosophy of mind; philosophy of science

Michael William Wheeler (born 5 November 1960) is a British philosopher and Professor of Philosophy at the University of Stirling. He is known for his Heideggerian approach to contemporary cognitive science research.

== Books ==
- Reconstructing the Cognitive World: The Next Step (2007)
- Heidegger and Cognitive Science (2012)
- Distributed Cognition in Medieval and Renaissance Culture (June 2019)
- Distributed Cognition in Enlightenment and Romantic Culture (September 2019)

== See also ==
- Black Notebooks
