= Being and Time =

1927 book by Martin Heidegger

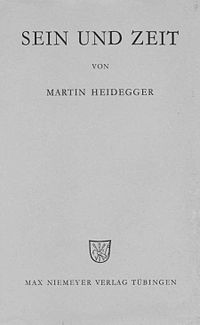
- Cover of the first edition
- Author: Martin Heidegger
- Original title: Sein und Zeit
- Translator: 1962: John Macquarrie and Edward Robinson; 1996: Joan Stambaugh
- Language: German
- Subject: Being, time
- Published: 1927 (in German); 1962: SCM Press; 1996: State University of New York Press; 2008: Harper Perennial Modern Thought
- Publication place: Germany
- Pages: 589 (Macquarrie and Robinson translation); 482 (Stambaugh translation); 656 (Welch translation)
- ISBN: 0-631-19770-2 (Blackwell edition); 9781438432762 (State University of New York Press edition); 9780300282726 (Yale University Press edition)
- Followed by: Kant and the Problem of Metaphysics

Being and Time (German: Sein und Zeit) is the 1927 magnum opus of German philosopher Martin Heidegger and a key document of existentialism. Being and Time had a notable impact on subsequent philosophy, literary theory and many other fields. Though controversial, its stature in intellectual history has been compared with works by Immanuel Kant and G. W. F. Hegel. The book attempts to revive ontology through an analysis of Dasein, or "being-in-the-world." It is also noted for an array of neologisms and complex language, as well as an extended treatment of "authenticity" as a means to grasp and confront the unique and finite possibilities of the individual.

== Background ==
Richard Wolin notes that the work "implicitly adopted the critique of mass society" epitomised earlier by Søren Kierkegaard and Friedrich Nietzsche. "Elitist complaints about the 'dictatorship of public opinion' were common currency to the German mandarins of the twenties," according to Jürgen Habermas (1989). Wolin writes that Being and Time is "suffused by a sensibility derived from secularized Protestantism" and its stress on original sin, and that the human condition is portrayed as "essentially a curse." Wolin cites the work's extended emphasis on "emotionally laden concepts" like guilt, conscience, angst and death.

The book is likened to a secularized version of Martin Luther's project, which aimed to turn Christian theology back to an earlier and more "original" phase. Taking this view, John D. Caputo notes that Heidegger made a systematic study of Luther in the 1920s after training for 10 years as a Catholic theologian. Similarly, Hubert Dreyfus likens Division II of the volume to a secularized version of Kierkegaard's Christianity. Almost all central concepts of Being and Time are derived from Augustine, Luther, and Kierkegaard, according to Christian Lotz.

In terms of structure, Being and Time consists of the lengthy two-part introduction, followed by Division One, the "Preparatory Fundamental Analysis of Dasein," and Division Two, "Dasein and Temporality." Heidegger originally planned to write a separate, second volume, but quickly abandoned the project. The unwritten "second half" was to include a critique of Western philosophy.

== Summary ==
=== Dasein ===
Being and Time explicitly rejects Descartes' notion of the human being as a subjective spectator of objects, according to Marcella Horrigan-Kelly (et al.). The book instead holds that both subject and object are inseparable. In presenting the subject, "being" as inseparable from the objective "world," Heidegger introduced the term "Dasein" (literally being there), intended to embody a "living being" through their activity of "being there" and "being in the world" (Horrigan-Kelly). Understood as a unitary phenomenon rather than a contingent, additive combination, being-in-the-world is an essential characteristic of Dasein, according to Michael Wheeler (2011).

Heidegger's account of Dasein passes through an analysis of angst, "the Nothing" and mortality, and of the structure of "care" as such. He then defines "authenticity," as a means to grasp and confront the finite possibilities of Dasein. Moreover, Dasein is "the being that will give access to the question of the meaning of Being," according to Heidegger.

=== Being ===
The work claims that ordinary and even mundane "being-in-the-world" provides "access to the meaning, or 'sense of being' [Sinn des Seins]." This access via Dasein is also that "in terms of which something becomes intelligible as something." This meaning would then elucidate ordinary "prescientific" understanding, which precedes abstract ways of knowing, such as logic or theory.

Heidegger's concept of Being is metaphorical, according to Richard Rorty, who agrees with Heidegger that there is no "hidden power" called Being. Heidegger emphasizes that no particular understanding of Being (nor of Dasein) is to be valued over another, according to an account of Rorty's analysis by Edward Grippe. This supposed "non-linguistic, pre-cognitive access" to the meaning of Being did not underscore any particular, preferred narrative.

Thomas Sheehan and Mark Wrathall each separately assert that commentators' emphasis on the term "Being" is misplaced, and that Heidegger's central focus was never on "Being" as such. Wrathall wrote (2011) that Heidegger's elaborate concept of "unconcealment" was his central, life-long focus, while Sheehan (2015) proposed that the philosopher's prime focus was on that which "brings about being as a givenness of entities." Being and Time actually offers "no sense of how we might answer the question of being as such," writes Simon Critchley in a nine-part blog commentary on the work for The Guardian (2009). The book instead provides "an answer to the question of what it means to be human" (Critchley). Nonetheless, Heidegger does present the concept: "'Being' is not something like a being but is rather "what determines beings as beings." This phenomenon is also called world disclosure.

=== Time ===
Heidegger believes that time finds its meaning in death, according to Michael Kelley. That is, time is understood only from a finite or mortal vantage. Dasein's fundamental characteristic and mode of "being-in-the-world" is temporal: Having been "thrown" into a world implies a "pastness" in its being. "The present is the nodal moment which makes past and future intelligible," writes Lilian Alweiss. Dasein occupies itself with the present tasks required by goals it has projected on the future.

Dasein as an intertwined subject/object cannot be separated from its objective "historicality," a concept Heidegger credits in the text to Wilhelm Dilthey. Dasein is "stretched along" temporally between birth and death, and thrown into its world; into its future possibilities which Dasein is charged with assuming. Dasein's access to this world and these possibilities is always via a history and a tradition—or "world historicality".

== Methodologies ==
=== Phenomenology ===
Heidegger's mentor Edmund Husserl developed a method of analysis called "phenomenological reduction" or "bracketing," that emphasized primordial experience as its key element. Husserl used this method to define the structures of consciousness and show how they are directed at both real and ideal objects within the world.

Being and Time employs this method but purportedly modifies Husserl's subjectivist tendencies. Whereas Husserl conceived humans as constituted by consciousness, Heidegger countered that consciousness is peripheral to Dasein, which cannot be reduced to consciousness. Consciousness is thus an "effect" rather than a determinant of existence. By shifting the priority from consciousness (psychology) to existence (ontology), Heidegger altered the subsequent direction of phenomenology.

But Being and Time misrepresented its phenomenology as a departure from methods established earlier by Husserl, according to Daniel O. Dahlstrom. In this vein, Robert J. Dostal asserts that "if we do not see how much it is the case that Husserlian phenomenology provides the framework for Heidegger's approach," then it's impossible to exactly understand Being and Time.

On publication in 1927, Being and Time bore a dedication to Husserl, who beginning a decade earlier, championed Heidegger's work, and helped him secure the retiring Husserl's chair in Philosophy at the University of Freiburg in 1928. Because Husserl was Jewish, in 1941 Heidegger, then a member of the Nazi Party, agreed to remove the dedication from Being and Time (restored in 1953 edition).

=== Hermeneutics ===
Being and Time employed the "hermeneutic circle" as a method of analysis or structure for ideas. According to Susann M. Laverty (2003), Heidegger's circle moves from the parts of experience to the whole of experience and back and forth again and again to increase the depth of engagement and understanding. Laverty writes (Kvale 1996), "This spiraling through a hermeneutic circle ends when one has reached a place of sensible meaning, free of inner contradictions, for the moment."

The hermeneutic circle and certain theories concerning history in Being and Time are acknowledged within the text to rely on the writings of Wilhelm Dilthey. The technique was later employed in the writings of Jürgen Habermas, per "Influence and reception" below.

=== Destructuring ===
In Being and Time Heidegger briefly refutes the philosophy of René Descartes (in an exercise he called "destructuring"), but the second volume, intended as a Destruktion of Western philosophy, was never written. Heidegger sought to explain how theoretical knowledge came to be seen, incorrectly in his view, as fundamental to being. This explanation takes the form of a destructuring (Destruktion) of the philosophical tradition, an interpretative strategy that reveals the fundamental experience of being hidden within the theoretical attitude of the metaphysics of presence.

In later works, while becoming less systematic and more obscure than in Being and Time, Heidegger turns to the exegesis of historical texts, especially those of Presocratic philosophers, but also of Aristotle, Kant, Hegel, Plato, Nietzsche, and Hölderlin, among others.

== Influence and reception ==
Jean-Paul Sartre's existentialism (of 1943) has been described as merely "a version of Being and Time". The work also influenced other philosophers of Sartre's generation, and exerted a notable influence on French philosophy.

Heidegger's work influenced the output of the Frankfurt School including Jürgen Habermas's hermeneutics and Herbert Marcuse's early and abortive attempt to develop "Heideggerian Marxism." Theodor Adorno, in his 1964 book The Jargon of Authenticity, was critical of Heidegger's popularity in post-war Western Europe. Adorno accused Heidegger of evading ethical judgment by disingenuously presenting "authenticity" as a value-free, technical term – rather than a positive doctrine of the good life. Heidegger influenced psychoanalysis through Jacques Lacan as well as Medard Boss and others. Paul Celan, in his essays on poetic theory, incorporated some of Heidegger's ideas. Being and Time also separately influenced Alain Badiou's work Being and Event (1988), and also separately the enactivist approach to cognition theory.

Bertrand Russell was dismissive of Being and Time ("One cannot help suspecting that language is here running riot"), and the analytic philosopher A. J. Ayer outright called Heidegger a charlatan. But the American philosopher Richard Rorty ranked Heidegger among the important philosophers of the twentieth century, including John Dewey and Ludwig Wittgenstein.

== Related work ==
Being and Time is the major achievement of Heidegger's early career, but he produced other important works during this period:

- The publication in 1992 of the early lecture course, Platon: Sophistes (Plato's Sophist, 1924), made clear the way in which Heidegger's reading of Aristotle's Nicomachean Ethics was crucial to the formulation of the thought expressed in Being and Time.
- The lecture course, Prolegomena zur Geschichte des Zeitbegriffs (History of the Concept of Time: Prolegomena, 1925), was something like an early version of Being and Time.
- The lecture courses immediately following the publication of Being and Time, such as Die Grundprobleme der Phänomenologie (The Basic Problems of Phenomenology, 1927), and Kant und das Problem der Metaphysik (Kant and the Problem of Metaphysics, 1929), elaborated some elements of the destruction of metaphysics which Heidegger intended to pursue in the unwritten second part of Being and Time.

Although Heidegger did not complete the project outlined in Being and Time, later works explicitly addressed the themes and concepts of Being and Time. Most important among the works which do so are the following:

- Heidegger's inaugural lecture upon his return to Freiburg, "Was ist Metaphysik?" (What Is Metaphysics?, 1929), was an important and influential clarification of what Heidegger meant by being, non-being, and nothingness.
- Einführung in die Metaphysik (An Introduction to Metaphysics), a lecture course delivered in 1935, is identified by Heidegger, in his preface to the seventh German edition of Being and Time, as relevant to the concerns which the second half of the book would have addressed.
- Beiträge zur Philosophie (Vom Ereignis) (Contributions to Philosophy [From Enowning], composed 1936–38, published 1989), a sustained attempt at reckoning with the legacy of Being and Time.
- Zeit und Sein (Time and Being), a lecture delivered at the University of Freiburg on January 31, 1962. This was Heidegger's most direct confrontation with Being and Time. It was followed by a seminar on the lecture, which took place at Todtnauberg on September 11–13, 1962, a summary of which was written by Alfred Guzzoni. (Note: "There is put to the thinking of Being the task of thinking Being in such a way that oblivion essentially belongs to it."—Alfred Guzzoni, 1972, p. 29) Both the lecture and the summary of the seminar are included in Zur Sache des Denkens (1969; translated as On Time and Being, New York: Harper & Row, 1972).

== See also ==
- Existential isolation
- Heideggerian terminology
