= Thrownness =

Heideggerian ontological conception of the human condition

Thrownness (German: Geworfenheit) is a concept introduced by German philosopher Martin Heidegger (1889–1976) to describe humans' individual existences as being 'thrown' (geworfen) into the world.

== Overview ==
Geworfen denotes the arbitrary character of Dasein's experience in the sense of its having been born into a specific family in a particular culture at a given moment of human history. The past, through Being-toward-death, becomes a part of Dasein. Awareness and acknowledgment of the arbitrariness of Dasein is characterized as a state of "thrown-ness" in the present with all its attendant frustrations, sufferings, and demands that one does not choose, such as social conventions or ties of kinship and duty. The very fact of one's own existence is a manifestation of thrown-ness. The idea of the past as a matrix not chosen, but at the same time not utterly binding or deterministic, results in the notion of Geworfenheit—a kind of alienation that human beings struggle against, and that leaves a paradoxical opening for freedom:

The thrower of the project is thrown in his own throw. How can we account for this freedom? We cannot. It is simply a fact, not caused or grounded, but the condition of all causation and grounding.

For William J. Richardson, Geworfenheit "must be understood in a purely ontological sense as wishing to signify the matter-of-fact character of human finitude". That's why "thrownness" is the best English word for Geworfenheit. Richardson: "[Other] attractive translations such as 'abandon,' 'dereliction,' 'dejection,' etc. [...] are [dangerous because they are] too rich with ontic, anthropological connotations. We retain 'thrown-ness' as closest to the original and, perhaps, least misleading."

In his main work The Principle of Hope (1954–1959), the anti-Heideggerian author Ernst Bloch has correlated the thrownness into the world with a dog's life: hope "will not tolerate a dog's life which feels itself only passively thrown into What Is, which is not seen through, even wretchedly recognized."

== In popular culture ==
Bloch's reference to the life of a dog may have been picked up by The Doors in a verse of their 1971 song "Riders on the Storm": "Into this world we're thrown / Like a dog without a bone." In 2009, Simon Critchley dedicated his column on The Guardian to Heidegger's concept of thrownness and explained it using the aforementioned verse of The Doors. Speaking with Krieger and Manzarek, the German philosopher Thomas Collmer tells how this verse recalls Heidegger's concept of thrownness: in 1963 at Florida State University in Tallahassee, Jim Morrison attended a whole lecture in which philosophers who had examined the philosophical tradition, such as Friedrich Nietzsche and Martin Heidegger, were discussed.

== Legacy ==
In their 1986 book Understanding Computers and Cognition. A New Foundation for Design, authors Terry Winograd and Fernando Flores applied Heidegger's concept of thrownness to the field of software design.

== See also ==
- Facticity in Heidegger
