= Metaphysics of presence =

Philosophical concept

Metaphysics of presence (German: Metaphysik der Anwesenheit) is a view held by Martin Heidegger in Being and Time that holds the entire history of Western philosophy is based on privileging presence over absence. Another translation of presence and absence is effectivity and possibility.

== See also ==
- Heideggerian terminology
