= Dasein =

Term in Martin Heidegger's philosophy

Dasein (/ˈdɑːzaɪn/ DAH-zyne; German: [ˈdaːzaɪn]) is a term in the philosophy of Martin Heidegger. Adopted from the ordinary German word Dasein meaning 'existence', Heidegger used it to refer to the mode of being that he believed is particular to human beings, who are aware of and must confront such issues as personhood, mortality, and the dilemma or paradox of living in relationship with other humans while being ultimately alone with oneself. To put it in simpler terms, it may be understood as a particular way in which humans have consciously felt addressed and challenged by this world, or the philosophical inquiry of difference itself.

== Meaning ==
In German, Dasein is the vernacular term for "existence". It is derived from da-sein, which literally means "being-there" or "there-being". In a philosophical context, it was first used by Leibniz and Wolff in the 17th century, as well as by Kant and Hegel in the 18th and 19th; however, Heidegger's later association of the word with human existence was uncommon and not of special philosophical significance during this period.

Dasein for Heidegger is a mode of being involved with and caring for the immediate world in which one lives, while always remaining aware of the contingent element of that involvement, of the priority of the world to the self, and of the evolving nature of the self itself.

The opposite of this authentic self is everyday and inauthentic Dasein, the forfeiture of one's individual meaning, destiny and lifespan, in favour of an (escapist) immersion in the public everyday world –the anonymous, identical world of the They and the They.

In harmony with Nietzsche's critique of the subject, as something definable in terms of consciousness, Heidegger distinguished Dasein from consciousness in order to emphasize the way that "Being" shapes our entire understanding and interpretation of the world.

"This entity which each of us is himself...we shall denote by the term 'Dasein'" (Heidegger, trans. 1927/1962, p.27).

"[Dasein is] that entity which in its Being has this very Being as an issue..." (Heidegger, trans. 1927/1962, p.68).

Heidegger sought to use the concept of Dasein to uncover the primal nature of "Being" (Sein), agreeing with Nietzsche and Dilthey that Dasein is always a being engaged in the world: neither a subject, nor the objective world alone, but the coherence of being-in-the-world. This ontological basis of Heidegger's work thus opposes the Cartesian "abstract agent" in favour of practical engagement with one's environment. Dasein is revealed by projection into, and engagement with, a personal world –a never-ending process of involvement with the world as mediated through the projects of the self.

Heidegger considered that language, everyday curiosity, logical systems, and common beliefs obscure Dasein's nature from itself. Authentic choice means turning away from the collective world of Them, to face Dasein, one's individuality, one's own limited life-span, one's own being. Heidegger thus intended the concept of Dasein to provide a stepping stone in the questioning of what it means to be –to have one's own being, one's own death, one's own truth.

Heidegger also saw the question of Dasein as extending beyond the realms disclosed by positive science or in the history of metaphysics. "Scientific research is not the only manner of Being which this entity can have, nor is it the one which lies closest. Moreover, Dasein itself has a special distinctiveness as compared with other entities; [...] it is ontically distinguished by the fact that, in its very Being, that Being is an issue for it." Being and Time stressed the ontological difference between entities and the being of entities: "Being is always the Being of an entity." Establishing this difference is the general motif running through Being and Time.

Some scholars disagree with this interpretation, however, arguing that for Heidegger Dasein denoted a structured awareness or an institutional "way of life". Others in turn suggested that Heidegger's early insistence on the ontological priority of Dasein was muted in his post-war writings.

== Origin and inspiration ==
Some have argued for an origin of Dasein in Chinese philosophy and Japanese philosophy: according to Tomonobu Imamichi, Heidegger's concept of Dasein was inspired—although Heidegger remained silent on this—by Okakura Kakuzo's concept of das-in-der-Welt-sein (being in the world) expressed in The Book of Tea to describe Zhuangzi's Taoist philosophy, which Imamichi's teacher had offered to Heidegger in 1919, after having followed lessons with him the year before. Parallel concepts are also found in Indian philosophy and in Native American lore.

== Other applications ==
Eero Tarasti considered Dasein very important in Existential Semiotics. In Tarasti's view the term Dasein has been given a "broader" meaning, has stopped meaning the condition of an individual being flung into the world, having instead come to signify an "existential phase" with the sociohistoric characteristics from which signs extensively emerge.

From this point of view, transcendence is the desire to surpass realist acceptance of the world as it is and to move towards a political, ethical and planned reality of subjectivity in semiotic relations with the world.

Jacques Lacan turned in the 1950s to Heidegger's Dasein for his characterisation of the psychoanalyst as being-for-death (être-pour-la-mort). Similarly, he saw the analyst as searching for authentic speech, as opposed to "the subject who loses his meaning in the objectifications of discourse...[which] will give him the wherewithal to forget his own existence and his own death".

Alfred Schütz distinguished between direct and indirect social experience, emphasising that in the latter, "My orientation is not toward the existence (Dasein) of a concrete individual Thou. It is not toward any subjective experiences now being constituted in all their uniqueness in another's mind".

Aleksandr Dugin uses Dasein as the foundation for the Fourth Political Theory, emphasizing Dasein and its role in Russian society. He puts this in opposition to Western (more specifically American) society, which is far too individualistic with an inauthentic view of individuality.

== Rhetorical use in the German election of November 1933 ==
Heidegger used the concept of Dasein to discuss Nazi ideology, and to advocate support for Hitler. In the context of the German election of November 1933—in which the electorate was presented with a single Nazi-approved list of candidates—he said the following:

The German people has been summoned by the Führer to vote; the Führer, however, is asking nothing from the people; rather, he is giving the people the possibility of making, directly, the highest free decision of all: whether it – the entire people – wants its own existence (Dasein), or whether it does not want it. [...] On November 12, the German people as a whole will choose its future, and this future is bound to the Führer. [...] There are not separate foreign and domestic policies. There is only one will to the full existence (Dasein) of the State. The Führer has awakened this will in the entire people and has welded it into a single resolve.

== Criticism ==
Theodor W. Adorno criticised Heidegger's concept of Dasein as an idealistic retreat from historical reality.

Richard Rorty considered that with Dasein, Heidegger was creating a conservative myth of being, complicit with the Romantic elements of Nazism.

According to Julian Wolfreys, "There is no direct 'face'-to-'face' relation for Heidegger; despite his invaluable critique of ontology, he still reduces the relation between Dasein and Dasein as mediated by the question and problematic of being."

== See also ==
- Being
- Face-to-face (philosophy)
- Existenz
- Generalised other
- Heideggerian terminology
- Nihilism
- Pre-Socratics
- Sartre
- Self-awareness
- Soul
- Thing-in-itself
- Thrownness
- True self and false self
