= Only a God Can Save Us =

1966 interview given by Martin Heidegger

"Only a God Can Save Us" (German: Nur noch ein Gott kann uns retten) refers to an interview given by Martin Heidegger to Rudolf Augstein and Georg Wolff for Der Spiegel magazine on September 23, 1966. Heidegger agreed to discuss his political past but asked for the publication to be delayed until after his death. The interview went beyond personal questions to address the general connections between philosophy, politics, and culture (as indicated by the title quote). It was published five days after Heidegger's death, on 31 May 1976. The English translation was produced by William J. Richardson.

== Summary concerning Heidegger's political past ==
The title derives from a passage of the interview in which Heidegger speaks of the impotence of philosophy in the face of the present crisis of civilization: "Only a God can save us. The only possibility available to us is that by thinking and poetizing we prepare a readiness for the appearance of a God, or for the absence of a God in [our] decline, insofar as in view of the absent god we are in a state of decline."

In the interview, Heidegger defended his entanglement with National Socialism in two ways: first, he argued that there was no alternative, saying that with his acceptance of the position of rector of the University of Freiburg he was trying to save the university (and science in general) from being politicized and thus had to compromise with the Nazi administration. Second, he admitted that he saw an "awakening" (Aufbruch) which might help to find a "new national and social approach," but said that he changed his mind about this in 1934, when he refused, under threat of dismissal, to remove from the position of dean of the faculty those who were not acceptable to the Nazi party, and he consequently decided to resign as rector.

In his interview Heidegger defended his description of the "inner truth and greatness of this movement" in a 1935 lecture as double-speak. He said that Nazi informants who observed his lectures would understand that by "movement" he meant National Socialism. However, Heidegger asserted that his dedicated students would know this statement was not meant to glorify the NSDAP. Rather, he claimed that the "movement" was in reference was to "the confrontation of planetary technology and modern humanity", which was according to him included in parentheses, though left unsaid in the actual lecture. This phrase was also included in his Introduction to Metaphysics (1953).

A conflicting account was given by Karl Löwith, according to which Heidegger, during a 1936 visit to his Jewish student in Rome, had exhibited an NSDAP insignia. Löwith maintains that Heidegger did not make any decisive break with National Socialism in 1934, and that Heidegger was willing to entertain more profound relations between his philosophy and political involvement. The Der Spiegel interviewers did not bring up Heidegger's 1949 quotation comparing the industrialization of agriculture to the extermination camps. In fact, the interviewers were not in possession of much of the evidence now known in support of Heidegger's Nazi sympathies.

== See also ==
- Martin Heidegger and Nazism
