= Introduction to Metaphysics (Heidegger book) =

1953 book by Martin Heidegger

- Author: Martin Heidegger
- Original title: Einführung in die Metaphysik
- Translators: 1959: Ralph Manheim; 2000: Gregory Fried and Richard Polt
- Language: German
- Subject: Metaphysics
- Publisher: 1959: Yale University Press; 2000: Yale University Press; 2014: Yale University Press (revised and expanded ed.)
- Publication date: 1953
- Publication place: Germany
- English publication date: 1959 (Manheim); 2000 (Fried & Polt); 2014 (Fried & Polt, revised and expanded ed.)
- Preceded by: Kant and the Problem of Metaphysics
- Followed by: Contributions to Philosophy

Introduction to Metaphysics (German: Einführung in die Metaphysik) is a revised and edited 1935 lecture course by Martin Heidegger first published in 1953. The work is notable for a discussion of the Presocratics and for illustrating Heidegger's supposed "Kehre," or turn in thought beginning in the 1930s—as well as for its mention of the "inner greatness" of Nazism. Heidegger suggested the work relates to the unwritten "second half" of his 1927 magnum opus Being and Time.

== Background and publication history ==
Introduction to Metaphysics, originally a summer lecture course at the University of Freiburg in 1935, was first published eighteen years later by the Max Niemeyer Verlag (Halle, Germany), simultaneously with the Seventh German Edition of Being and Time.

In a one-page preface accompanying this post-war edition of Being and Time, Heidegger wrote that the newly available Introduction to Metaphysics, would "elucidate" material contemplated for the once-promised but long-abandoned "second half" of Being and Time. The preface also noted that the text of this latest (1953) B&T edition had eliminated several references to itself as a "first half."

Among English translations, the second edition (2014) of a version by Gregory Fried and Richard Polt from Yale Press (New Haven) was in print as of 2026. Ralph Manheim produced a 1959 translation praised by Fried and Polt in their introduction to the second edition as largely responsible for introducing Heidegger to the English-speaking world. But Manheim worked prior to the 1962 Macquarrie version of Being and Time—which established several conventions for Heidegger's English translators. Edited by Petra Jaeger, the work is included in Volume 40 (1983) of Heidegger's Gesamtausgabe (collected works).

== Presocratic Revivalism ==
Introduction to Metaphysics "was not about early Greek thought, and yet the Presocratics are at the pivotal center of discussion," writes Włodzimierz Julian Korab-Karpowicz. In this view, "the thinking of Heraclitus and Parmenides, which lies at the origin of philosophy, was falsified and misinterpreted" by Plato and Aristotle, thus tainting all of subsequent Western philosophy.

Heidegger aimed to correct this misunderstanding (Charles Guignon 2014) by reviving Presocratic notions of 'being' with an emphasis on "understanding the way beings show up in (and as) an unfolding happening or event." Guignon adds that "we might call this alternative outlook 'event ontology.'" (The concept of Ereignis, or "event," is more fully developed in Contributions to Philosophy 1938.)

Heidegger used his discussion of Heraclitus' and Parmenides' respective notions of logos in his argument that to avoid nihilism, modern philosophy must "reinvert" the traditional, post-Socratic conception of the relationship between being and thinking, according to Daniel Dahlstrom.

== Being and the Kehre ==
In a significant contrast with Being and Time eight years earlier, Heidegger's Introduction to Metaphysics "no longer places the inquiry into the Being of Dasein at the center of his work," Instead, the author "looks to language as the site of a meaning of Being" (Brian Bard, 1993 essay, "Heidegger's Reading of Heraclitus"). The work "clearly shows the shift" in Heidegger's thought, Bard writes.

This contrast is typically seen as the first instance of Heidegger's much-discussed Kehre, or turn in thinking, that became evident from the 1930s onward, according to Thomas Sheehan. But the supposed turn is "far less dramatic than usually suggested," according to Sheehan, and merely entailed a shift in focus and method. Separately, Mark Wrathall argued (2011) that the Kehre itself is a complete misconception on the part of interpreters, while pointing to Heidegger's supposed consistency of purpose throughout his career.

(Both Sheehan and Wrathall, separately, assert that Heidegger's central focus was never on "Being" as such. Wrathall wrote that Heidegger's elaborate concept of "unconcealment" was his central, life-long focus, while Sheehan proposed that the philosopher's prime focus was on that which "brings about being as a givenness of entities.")

== Politics ==
Gregory Fried and Richard Polt praised the work for "the range and depth of its thought as well as for its intricate and nuanced style", arguing that it deserved its status as the successor to Being and Time. Regarding its mention of National Socialism, they write that, “Interpreters differ widely, and often acrimoniously, on whether Heidegger’s Nazism was due to a personal character defect” or whether the philosophy itself reflects a fascist outlook.

Heidegger refers in the published text to the "inner truth and greatness of the movement," but adds a qualifying statement in parentheses: "(namely, the confrontation of planetary technology and modern humanity)." The qualification wasn't in the original lecture, although Heidegger falsely claimed otherwise. Moreover, the controversial page of the 1935 manuscript is missing from the Heidegger Archives in Marbach.

Heidegger defended the "inner greatness" comment in a 1966 interview with Der Spiegel (posthumously published 1976), claiming it was intended to mislead Nazi informants who observed his lectures. Heidegger asserted that dedicated students would understand that the comment wasn't a celebration of Nazism. Jurgen Habermas, in a 1953 review of the published work in the Frankfurter Allgemeine Zeitung noted the issue and wrote that "it's time to think with Heidegger against Heidegger."

Although Julian Young claims (1998) that the book is "widely considered fascist in character," this characterization is false according to Young, who writes that the work implicitly condemns Nazism for its racism, militarism and attempted destruction of civil society. The work has also been seen as being critical of Nazism for being insufficiently radical and suffering from the same spiritual impoverishment as the Soviet Union and the United States.

== Bibliography ==
Books

- Fried, Gregory; Polt, Richard, eds. (2001). A Companion to Heidegger's Introduction to Metaphysics. New Haven & London: Yale University Press. ISBN 978-0-300-08524-2.
- Heidegger, Martin (2014). Introduction to Metaphysics, Second Edition. New Haven & London: Yale University Press. ISBN 978-0-300-18612-3.
- Heidegger, Martin (1977). The Question Concerning Technology and Other Essays. New York: Harper & Row. ISBN 0-06-131969-4.
- Korab-Karpowicz, W. Julian (2016). The Presocratics in the Thought of Martin Heidegger. Frankfurt am Main & New York: Peter Lang. ISBN 978-3631712917.
- Young, Julian (1998). Heidegger, philosophy, Nazism. Cambridge: Cambridge University Press. ISBN 0-521-64494-1.

Journals

- Groth, Miles (2001). "Review: [Untitled]". The Review of Metaphysics. 55 (1).

Online articles

- Pégny, Gaëtan; Martinez, Andrea; Kellerer, Sidonie; Hoffman, Jordan; Duff, Alexander S. (November 7, 2014). "Response to Gregory Fried's "The King Is Dead: Heidegger's Black Notebooks"". Los Angeles Review of Books.
