= Gerhard Krüger =

Gerhard Krüger is the name of:

- Gerhard Krüger (philosopher) (1902–1972), German philosopher
- Gerhard Krüger (politician) (1908–1994), Nazi Party student leader and later a leading figure within the neo-Nazi movement
