= Martin Heidegger =

German philosopher (1889–1976)

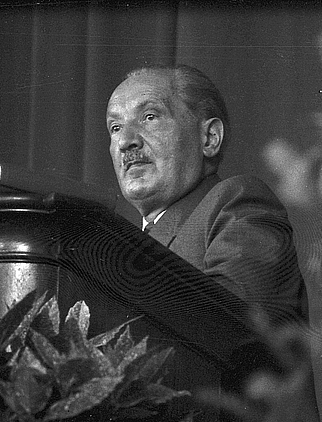
- Heidegger mid-lecture at Freiburg, 1954
- Born: 26 September 1889; Meßkirch, Grand Duchy of Baden, German Empire
- Died: 26 May 1976 (aged 86); Freiburg, Baden-Württemberg, West Germany
- Political party: Nazi Party (1933–1945)
- Spouse: Elfride Petri (m. 1917)
- Partners: Elisabeth Blochmann (1918–1969); Hannah Arendt (1924–1928)
- Children: 2, including Hermann

Education
- Education: Collegium Borromaeum (1909–1911); University of Freiburg (PhD, 1913; Dr. phil. hab., 1915)
- Theses: The Doctrine of Judgment in Psychologism: A Critical-theoretical Contribution to Logic (1913); Duns Scotus's Doctrine of Categories and Meaning (1915)
- Doctoral advisor: Artur Schneider (PhD advisor); Heinrich Rickert (Dr. phil. hab. advisor)

Philosophical work
- Era: 20th-century philosophy
- Region: Western philosophy
- School: Continental philosophy Existentialism; Hermeneutics; Phenomenology
- Institutions: University of Marburg; University of Freiburg
- Doctoral students: See list: Hans Jonas Karl Löwith Herbert Marcuse
- Notable students: See list: Giorgio Agamben Günther Anders Hannah Arendt Eugen Fink Hans-Georg Gadamer Jacob Klein Gerhard Krüger Emmanuel Levinas Max Müller Jan Patočka Lorenz Bruno Puntel William J. Richardson Joachim Ritter Heinrich Rombach Leo Strauss Ernst Tugendhat Helene Weiss
- Main interests: Art; Greek philosophy; language; metaphysics; ontology; poetry; technology
- Notable ideas: See list: Aletheia; Dasein; Disclosure; Fundamental ontology; Gestell

Martin Heidegger (Note: English: /ˈhaɪdɛɡər/ HY-deg-ər; German: [ˈmaʁtiːn ˈhaɪdɛɡɐ].) (26 September 1889 – 26 May 1976) was a German philosopher whose work was central to the development of phenomenology, hermeneutics, and existentialism. He has had significant influence within subsequent philosophy, social sciences and humanities, (Note: See e.g. the 2000s ontological turn.) and theology.

Heidegger's magnum opus, Being and Time (1927), is widely considered one of the most significant works of modern philosophy. In it, he introduced the concept of Dasein ("being-there") to describe the distinctive character of human existence, arguing that humans possess a "pre-ontological" understanding of being that shapes how they live and act, which he analyzed in terms of the unitary structure of "being-in-the-world". Through his analysis of Dasein, Heidegger sought to reawaken what he called "the question of being": the fundamental inquiry into what makes entities intelligible as the entities they are. In other words, Heidegger's governing "question of being" is concerned with what makes beings intelligible as beings. This question, he believed, had been neglected or obscured throughout the history of Western philosophy since the ancient Greeks.

His later work turned increasingly to questions of technology, language, art, and poetry, developing themes of human "dwelling" in the world and critiquing what he saw as the nihilistic trajectory of modern technological civilisation. Thinkers as varied as Jean-Paul Sartre, Hans-Georg Gadamer, Hannah Arendt, Jacques Derrida, Michel Foucault, Emmanuel Levinas, and Richard Rorty were substantially shaped by engagement with his thought, whether in agreement or opposition.

Heidegger's legacy has been complicated and shadowed by his involvement with Nazism. In April 1933, he was elected rector of the University of Freiburg and joined the Nazi Party, a membership he retained until 1945. The nature and extent of his commitment to Nazism, and the question of whether his philosophy is inherently connected to his political choices, remain subjects of significant scholarly controversy. After the war, he was banned from teaching following denazification proceedings, a ban later lifted in 1949, after which he returned to lecturing at the University of Freiburg.

== Biography ==
=== Early life and education ===
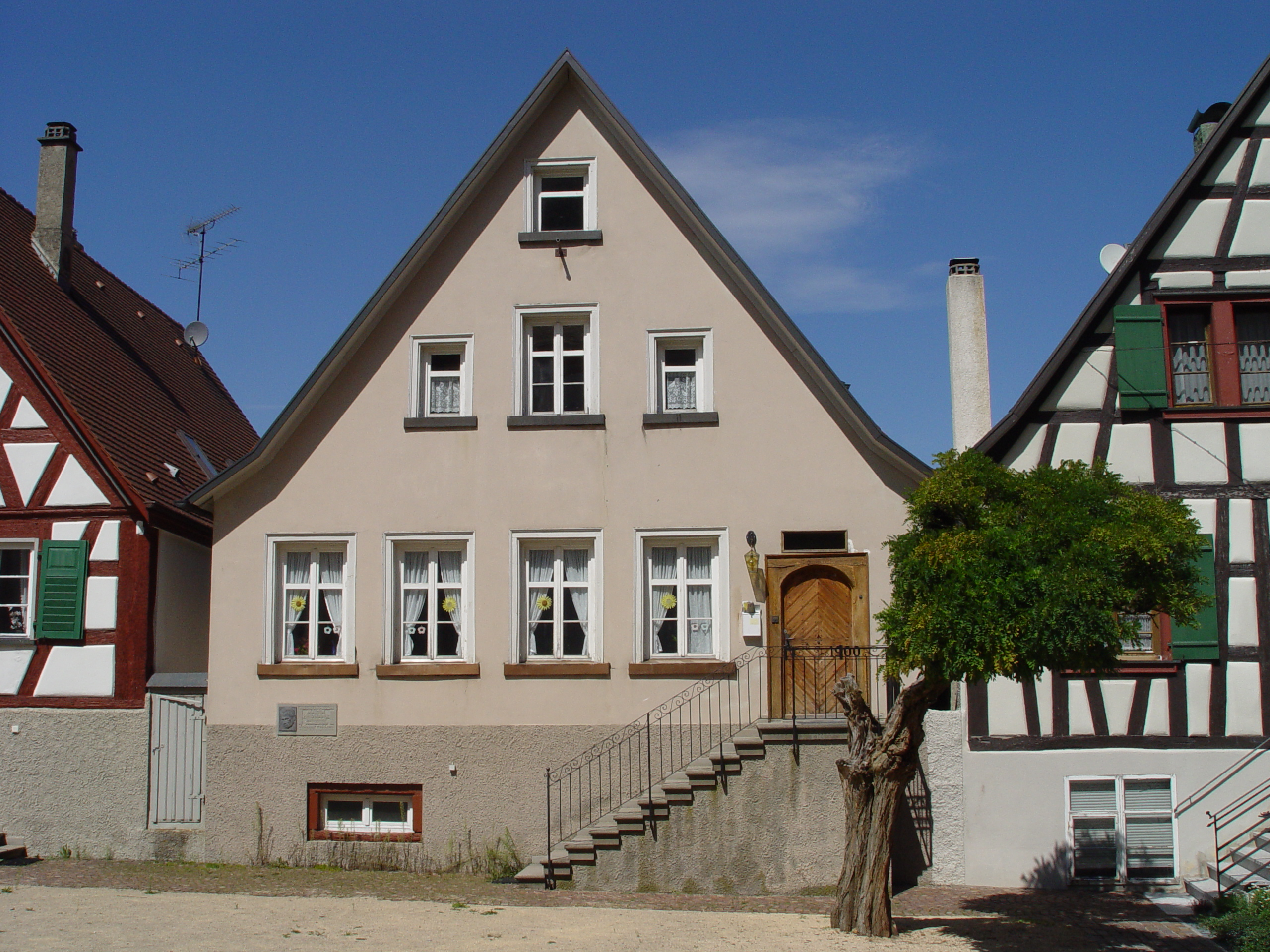
The Mesnerhaus in Meßkirch, where Heidegger grew up

Heidegger was born on 26 September 1889 in rural Meßkirch, Baden, the son of Johanna (née Kempf) and Friedrich Heidegger. His father was the sexton of the village church. Martin was raised Catholic.

In 1903, Heidegger began to train for the priesthood. He entered a Jesuit seminary in 1909, but was discharged within weeks due to heart trouble. It was during this time that he first encountered the work of Franz Brentano, the work of whom is credited as first sparking Heidegger's interest in the question of Being, specifically in regard to Brentano's thesis On the Manifold Sense of Being according to Aristotle. From here he went on to study theology and scholastic philosophy at the University of Freiburg.

In 1911, he broke off training for the priesthood and turned his attention to recent philosophy, in particular, Edmund Husserl's Logical Investigations. He graduated with a doctoral thesis on psychologism, The Doctrine of Judgment in Psychologism: A Critical-theoretical Contribution to Logic, in 1913. Two years later, he completed his habilitation thesis on Duns Scotus, which was directed by Heinrich Rickert, a neo-Kantian, and influenced by Husserl's phenomenology. The title has been published in several languages and in English is Duns Scotus's Doctrine of Categories and Meaning.

He attempted to get the (Catholic) philosophy post at the University of Freiburg on 23 June 1916 but failed despite the support of Heinrich Finke. Instead, he worked first as an unsalaried Privatdozent then served as a soldier during the final year of World War I. His service was in the last ten months of the war, most of which he spent in a meteorological unit on the western front upon being deemed unfit for combat.

=== Professorship ===
From 1919 to 1923, Heidegger taught courses at the University of Freiburg. (Note: See his published courses in Gesamtausgabe. Early Freiburg lecture courses, 1919–1923.) At this time he also became an assistant to Edmund Husserl, who had been a professor there since 1916.

==== Marburg ====
In 1923, Heidegger was elected to an extraordinary professorship in philosophy at the University of Marburg. His colleagues there included Rudolf Bultmann, Nicolai Hartmann, Paul Tillich, and Paul Natorp. His students at Marburg included Hans-Georg Gadamer, Helene Weiss, Karl Löwith, Hannah Arendt, Gerhard Krüger, Leo Strauss, Jacob Klein, Günther Anders, and Hans Jonas. Following Aristotle, he began to develop in his lectures the main theme of his philosophy: the question of the sense of being. He extended the concept of subject to the dimension of history and concrete existence, which he found prefigured in such Christian thinkers as Paul of Tarsus, Augustine of Hippo, Martin Luther, and Søren Kierkegaard. He also read the works of Wilhelm Dilthey, Husserl, Max Scheler, and Friedrich Nietzsche.

In 1927, Heidegger published his main work, Sein und Zeit (Being and Time). He was primarily concerned in qualifying to be a full professor. The book, however, did more than this: it raised him to "a position of international intellectual visibility."

==== Freiburg ====
When Husserl retired as professor of philosophy in 1928, Heidegger accepted Freiburg's election to be his successor, in spite of a counteroffer by Marburg. The title of his 1929 inaugural lecture was "What is Metaphysics?" In this year he also published Kant and the Problem of Metaphysics.

Heidegger remained at Freiburg im Breisgau for the rest of his life, declining later offers, including one from Humboldt University of Berlin. His students at Freiburg included Günther Anders, Hans Jonas, Karl Löwith, Charles Malik, Herbert Marcuse, and Ernst Nolte. Emmanuel Levinas attended his lecture courses during his stay in Freiburg in 1928, as did Jan Patočka in 1933; Patočka, in particular, was deeply influenced by him.

Heidegger was elected rector of the university on 21 April 1933; he joined the Nazi Party on 1 May, just three months after Adolf Hitler was appointed chancellor. During his time as rector he was a member and an enthusiastic supporter of the party. There is continuing controversy as to the relationship between his philosophy and his political allegiance to Nazism.

He wanted to position himself as the philosopher of the party, but the highly abstract nature of his work and the opposition of Alfred Rosenberg, who himself aspired to act in that position, limited Heidegger's role. His withdrawal from his position as rector owed more to his frustration as an administrator than to any principled opposition to the Nazis, according to historians. In his inaugural address as rector on 27 May he expressed his support of a German revolution, and in an article and a speech to the students from the same year he also vocalized support for Adolf Hitler. In November 1933, Heidegger signed the Vow of allegiance of the Professors of the German Universities and High-Schools to Adolf Hitler and the National Socialistic State. Heidegger resigned from the rectorate in April 1934 and pursued a teaching agenda aligned with Nazi cultural politics until 1945.

In 1935, he gave the talk "The Origin of the Work of Art". The next year, while in Rome, Heidegger gave his first lecture on Friedrich Hölderlin. In the years 1936–1937, Heidegger wrote what some commentators consider his second greatest work, Contributions to Philosophy; it would not be published, however, until 1989, 13 years after his death.

From 1936 to 1940, he delivered a series of lectures on Friedrich Nietzsche at Freiburg that presented much of the raw material incorporated in his more established work and thought from this time. These would appear in published form in 1961. This period also marks the beginning of his interest in the "essence of technology". In the autumn of 1944, Heidegger was drafted into the Volkssturm and assigned to dig anti-tank ditches along the Rhine.

=== Post-war ===
In late 1946, as France engaged in épuration légale in its occupation zone, the French military authorities determined that Heidegger should be blocked from teaching or participating in any university activities because of his association with the Nazi Party. (Note: Provisional ruling 5 October 1946; final ruling 28 December 1946; Hugo Ott, Martin Heidegger: A Political Life (Harper Collins, 1993, p. 348).) Nevertheless, he presented the talk "What are Poets for?" in memory of Rilke. He also published "On Humanism" in 1947 to clarify his differences with Jean-Paul Sartre and French existentialism. The denazification procedures against Heidegger continued until March 1949 when he was finally pronounced a Mitläufer (the second lowest of five categories of "incrimination" by association with the Nazi regime). No punitive measures against him were proposed. This opened the way for his readmission to teaching at Freiburg University in the winter semester of 1950–51. He was granted emeritus status and then taught regularly from 1951 until 1958, and by invitation until 1967.

In 1966, he gave an interview to Der Spiegel attempting to justify his support of the Nazi Party. Per their agreement, it was not published until five days after his death in 1976, under the title "Only a God Can Save Us" after a reference to Hölderlin that Heidegger makes during the interview.

Heidegger's publications during this time were mostly reworked versions of his lectures. In his final days, he also arranged for a complete edition of his works, Heidegger Gesamtausgabe, to be compiled and published. The first volume appeared in 1975. The collection contains 106 volumes and is complete as of October 2025.

Martin Heidegger died in his sleep on the morning of 26 May 1976 at the age of 86 at his home in Freiburg. He was buried two days later in his birthplace of Meßkirch, West Germany, beside his parents in the village graveyard he had walked past each day on his way to school. His gravestone is inscribed with a single star, which refers to a sentence he wrote in 1947: "To think is to confine yourself to a single thought that one day stands still like a star in the world's sky."

=== Death ===
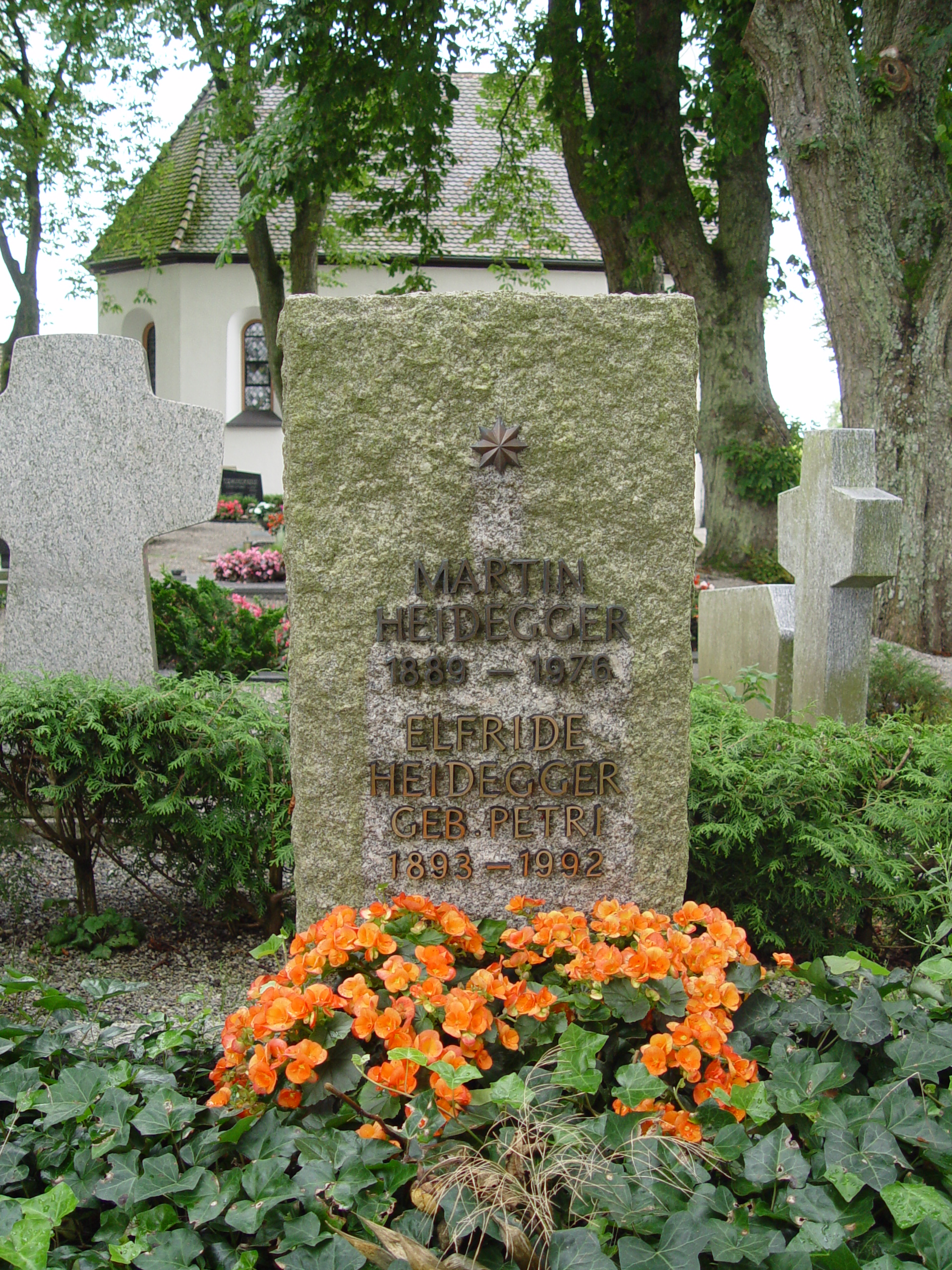
Heidegger's grave in Meßkirch

Heidegger died on 26 May 1976 in Freiburg. A few months before his death, he met with Bernhard Welte, a Catholic priest, Freiburg University professor and earlier correspondent. Heidegger was buried in the Meßkirch cemetery.

== Philosophy ==
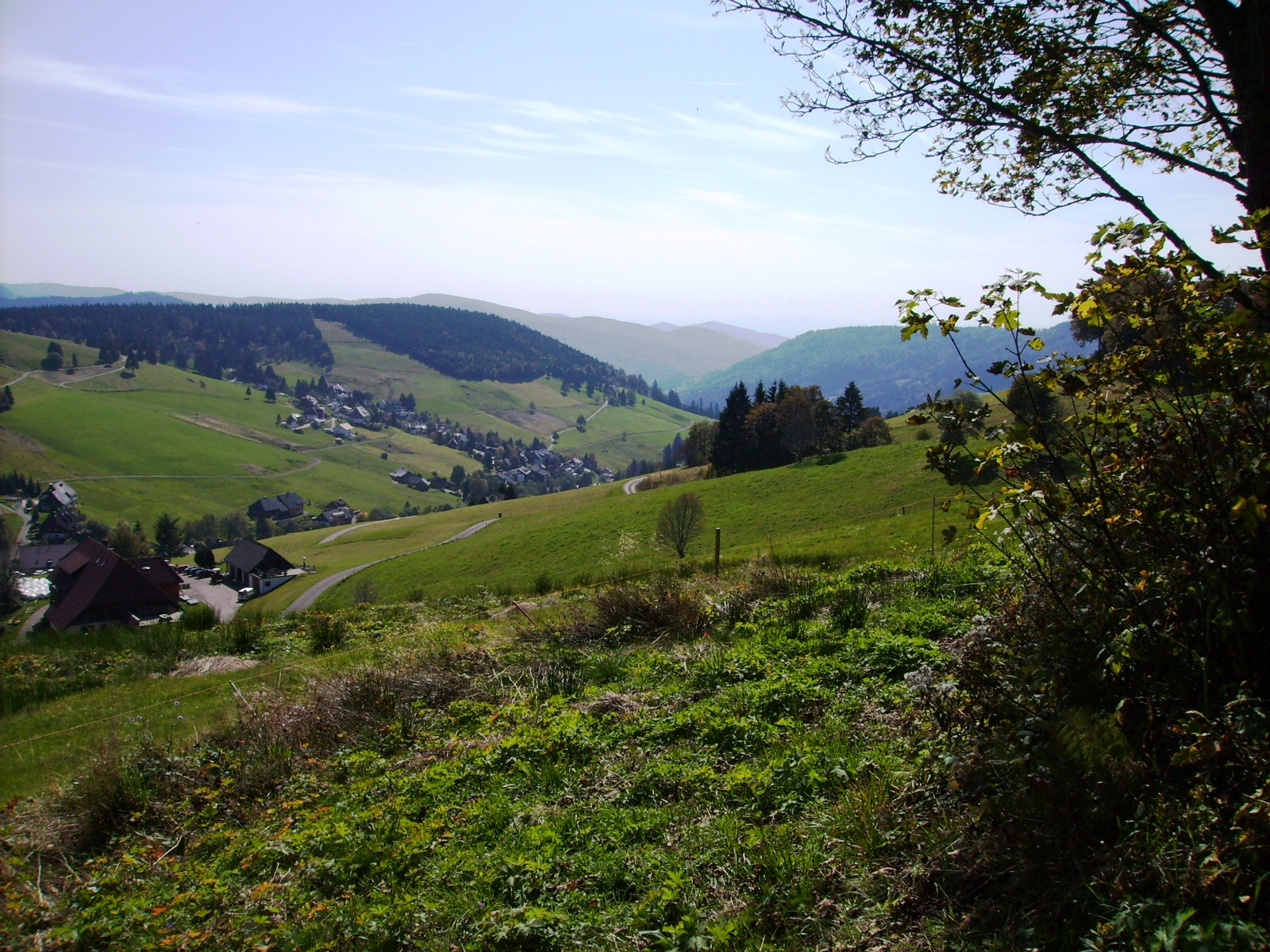
View from Heidegger's vacation chalet in Todtnauberg. Heidegger wrote most of Being and Time there.

=== Fundamental ontology ===
According to scholar Taylor Carman, traditional ontology asks "Why is there anything?", whereas Heidegger's fundamental ontology asks "What does it mean for something to be?" Heidegger's ontology "is fundamental relative to traditional ontology in that it concerns what any understanding of entities necessarily presupposes, namely, our understanding of that by virtue of which entities are entities".

This line of inquiry is "central to Heidegger's philosophy". He accuses the Western philosophical tradition of mistakenly trying to understand being as such as if it were an ultimate entity. Heidegger modifies traditional ontology by focusing instead on the meaning of being. This kind of ontological inquiry, he claims, is required to understand the basis of our understanding, scientific and otherwise. In short, before asking what exists, Heidegger contends that people must first examine what "to exist" even means.

=== Being and Time ===
In his first major work, Being and Time, Heidegger pursues this ontological inquiry by way of an analysis of the kind of being that people have, namely, that humans are the sort of beings able to pose the question of the meaning of being. According to Canadian philosopher Sean McGrath, Heidegger was probably influenced by Scotus in this approach. His term for us, in this phenomenological context, is Dasein.

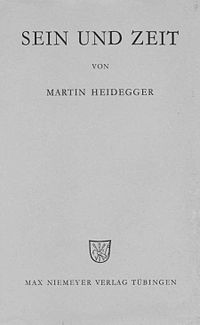
Title page of first edition of Being and Time

This procedure works because Dasein's pre-ontological understanding of being shapes experience. Dasein's ordinary and even mundane experience of "being-in-the-world" provides "access to the meaning" or "sense of being"; that is, the terms in which "something becomes intelligible as something". Heidegger proposes that this ordinary "prescientific" understanding precedes abstract ways of knowing, such as logic or theory. Being and Time is designed to show how this implicit understanding can be made progressively explicit through phenomenology and hermeneutics.

==== Being-in-the-world ====
Heidegger introduces the term Dasein to denote a "living being" through its activity of "being there". Understood as a unitary phenomenon rather than a contingent, additive combination, it is characterized by Heidegger as "being-in-the-world".

Heidegger insists that the 'in' of Dasein's being-in-the-world is an 'in' of involvement or of engagement, not of objective, physical enclosedness. The sense in which Dasein is 'in' the world is the sense of "residing" or "dwelling" in the world. Heidegger provides a few examples: "having to do with something, producing something, attending to something and looking after it, making use of something".

Just as 'being-in' does not denote objective, physical enclosedness, so 'world', as Heidegger uses the term, does not denote a universe of physical objects. The world, in Heidegger's sense, is to be understood according to our sense of our possibilities: things present themselves to people in terms of their projects, the uses to which they can put them. The 'sight' with which people grasp equipment is not a mentalistic intentionality, but what Heidegger calls 'circumspection'. This is to say that equipment reveals itself in terms of its 'towards-which', in terms of the work it is good for. In the everyday world, people are absorbed within the equipmental totality of their work-world. Moreover, on Heidegger's analysis, this entails a radical holism. In his own words, "there 'is' no such thing as an equipment".

For example, when someone sits down to dinner and picks up their fork, they are not picking up an object with good stabbing properties: they are non-reflectively engaging an 'in-order-to-eat'. When it works as expected, equipment is transparent; when it is used, it is subsumed under the work toward which it is employed. Heidegger calls this structure of practically ordered reference relations the 'worldhood of the world'.

Heidegger calls the mode of being of such entities "ready-to-hand", for they are understood only in being handled. If the fork is made of plastic, however, and it snaps in the course of using it, then it assumes the mode of being that Heidegger calls "present-at-hand". For now the fork needs to be made the object of focal awareness, considering it in terms of its properties. Is it too broken to use? If so, could the diner possibly get by with another utensil or just with their fingers? This kind of equipmental breakdown is not the only way that objects become present-at-hand for us, but Heidegger considers it typical of the way that this shift occurs in the course of ordinary goings-on.

In this way, Heidegger creates a theoretical space for the categories of subject and object, while at the same time denying that they apply to our most basic way of moving about in the world, of which they are instead presented as derivative.

Heidegger presents three primary structural features of being-in-the-world: understanding, attunement, and discourse. He calls these features "existentiales" or "existentialia" (Existenzialien) to distinguish their ontological status, as distinct from the "categories" of metaphysics:

- Understanding is "our fundamental ability to be someone, to do things, to get around in the world". It is the basic "know-how" in terms of which Dasein goes about pursuing the usually humdrum tasks that make up daily life. Heidegger argues that this mode of understanding is more fundamental than theoretical understanding.
- Attunement is "our way of finding ourselves thrust into the world". It can also be translated as "disposition" or "affectedness". (The standard translation of Macquarrie and Robinson uses "state-of-mind", but this misleadingly suggests a private mental state.) There is no perfect equivalent for Heidegger's Befindlichkeit, which is not even an ordinary German word. What needs to be conveyed, however, is "being found in a situation where things and opinions already matter".
- Discourse (sometimes: talk or telling [Rede]) is "the articulation of the world into recognizable, communicable patterns of meaning". It is implicated in both understanding and attunement: "The world that is opened up by moods and grasped by understanding gets organized by discourse. Discourse makes language possible." According to Heidegger, "Discourse is the articulation of intelligibility." In its most basic form, this referential whole manifests itself in the way things are told apart just in the course of using them.

Heidegger unifies these three existential features of Dasein in a composite structure he terms "care": (Note: Michael Inwood provides a brief discussion of this term to illustrate Heidegger's use of language more generally: "The word 'care', which corresponds closely, if not exactly, to the German Sorge, has a range of senses. We can see this from the adjectives it forms and the words they contrast with: 'careworn' and 'carefree'; 'careful' and 'careless'; 'caring' and 'uncaring'. These oppositions are not the same: one can be, for example, both careworn and careless. In ordinary usage, not everyone is careworn, careful and caring all the time. Some of us are carefree, careless or uncaring. Heidegger makes two innovations. First, he uses 'care' in a broad sense which underlies its diversification into the careworn, the careful and the caring. Second, in this sense of 'care', he insists, everyone cares; no one is wholly carefree, careless or uncaring. It is only because everyone is, in this fundamental sense, care-ful, that we can ever be carefree, careless or uncaring in the ordinary, or as he has it, the 'ontical', senses of these words. In the 'ontological' sense of 'care', everyone cares. All human beings, again, are 'ahead of themselves' (sich vorweg), roughly 'up to something' or on the lookout for what to do. What about those mired in hopeless despair? Even those, Heidegger insists, are 'ahead of themselves': 'Hopelessness does not tear Dasein away from its possibilities; it is only a particular mode of being toward these possibilities' (BT, 236).") "ahead-of-itself-being-already-in-(the-world) as being-amidst (entities encountered within-the-world)." What unifies this formula is temporality. Understanding is oriented towards future possibilities, attunement is shaped by the past, and discourse discloses the present in those terms. In this way, the investigation into the being of Dasein leads to time. Much of Division II of Being and Time is devoted to a more fundamental reinterpretation of the findings of Division I in terms of Dasein's temporality.

==== Das Man ====
As implied in the analysis of both attunement and discourse, Dasein is "always already", or a priori, a social being. In Heidegger's technical idiom, Dasein is "Dasein-with" (Mitsein), which he presents as equally primordial with "being-one's self" (Selbstsein).

Heidegger's term for this existential feature of Dasein is das Man, which is a German pronoun, man, that Heidegger turns into a noun. In English, it is usually translated as either "the they" or "the one" (sometimes also capitalized); for, as Heidegger puts it, "By 'others' we do not mean everyone else but me.... They are rather those from whom for the most part, one does not distinguish oneself—those among whom one is too". Quite frequently the term is just left in the German.

According to philosopher Hubert Dreyfus, part of Heidegger's aim is to show that, contrary to Husserl, individuals do not generate an intersubjective world from their separate activities; rather, "these activities presuppose the disclosure of one shared world". This is one way in which Heidegger breaks from the Cartesian tradition of beginning from the perspective of individual subjectivity. Dreyfus argues that the chapter on das Man is "the most confused" in Being and Time and so is often misinterpreted. The problem, he says, is that Heidegger's presentation conflates two opposing influences. The first is Dilthey's account of the role that public and historical contexts have in the production of significance. The second is Kierkegaard's insistence that truth is never to be found in the crowd.

The Diltheyian dimension of Heidegger's analysis positions das Man as ontologically existential in the same way as understanding, affectedness, and discourse. This dimension of Heidegger's analysis captures the way that a socio-historical "background" makes possible the specific significance that entities and activities can have. Philosopher Charles Taylor expands upon the term: "It is that of which I am not simply unaware... but at the same time I cannot be said to be explicitly or focally aware of it, because that status is already occupied by what it is making intelligible". For this reason, background non-representationally informs and enables engaged agency in the world, but is something that people can never make fully explicit to themselves.

The Kierkegaardian influence on Heidegger's analysis introduces a more existentialist dimension to Being and Time. (Existentialism is a broad philosophical movement largely defined by Jean-Paul Sartre and is not to be confused with Heidegger's technical analysis of the specific existential features of Dasein.) Its central notion is authenticity, which emerges as a problem from the "publicness" built into the existential role of das Man. In Heidegger's own words:

In this inconspicuousness and unascertainability, the real dictatorship of the 'they' is unfolded. We take pleasure and enjoy ourselves as they take pleasure; we read, see and judge about literature and art as they see and judge; likewise we shrink back from the 'great mass' as they shrink back; we find 'shocking' what they find shocking. The 'they', which is nothing definite, and which we all are, through not as the sum, prescribes the kind of being of everydayness.

==== Authenticity ====
Heidegger's term Eigentlichkeit is a neologism, in which Heidegger stresses the root eigen, meaning "own". So this word, usually translated "authenticity", could just as well be translated "ownedness" or "being one's own". Authenticity, according to Heidegger, is a matter of taking responsibility for being—that is, the stand that people take with respect to their ultimate projects. It is, in his terms, a matter of taking a properly "resolute" stand on "for-the-sake-of-which". Put differently, the "self" to which one is true in authenticity is not something just "there" to be discovered, but instead is a matter of "on-going narrative construction".

Scholars Somogy Varga and Charles Guignon describe three ways by which Dasein might attain an authentic relation to itself from out of its "fallen" condition as "they"-self. First, a powerful mood such as anxiety can disclose Dasein to itself as an ultimately isolated individual. Second, direct confrontation with Dasein's "ownmost" potential for death can similarly disclose to Dasein its own irreducible finitude. Third, experiencing "the call of conscience" can disclose to Dasein its own "guilt" (Schuld) as the debt it has to itself in virtue of having taken over pre-given possibilities that it is now Dasein's own responsibility to maintain.

Philosopher Michael E. Zimmerman describes authenticity as "resolving to accept the openness which, paradoxically, one already is". He emphasizes that this is a matter, not of "intellectual comprehension", but of "hard-won insight". Authenticity is ultimately a matter of allowing the ego to be "eclipsed by the manifestation of one's finitude".

Although the term "authenticity" disappears from Heidegger's writing after Being and Time, Zimmerman argues that it is supplanted in his later thought by the less subjective or voluntaristic notion of Ereignis. This ordinary German term for "event" or "happening" is theorized by Heidegger as the appropriation of Dasein into a cosmic play of concealment and appearance.

=== Later works: The Turn ===
Heidegger's "Turn", which is sometimes referred to by the German die Kehre, refers to a change in his work as early as 1930 that became clearly established by the 1940s, according to some commentators, who variously describe a shift of focus or a major change in outlook. (Note: "In a 1947 piece, in which Heidegger distances his views from Sartre's existentialism, he links the turn to his own failure to produce the missing divisions of Being and Time [i.e., "Time and Being"]. ... At root Heidegger's later philosophy shares the deep concerns of Being and Time, in that it is driven by the same preoccupation with Being and our relationship with it that propelled the earlier work. ... [T]he later Heidegger does seem to think that his earlier focus on Dasein bears the stain of a subjectivity that ultimately blocks the path to an understanding of Being. This is not to say that the later thinking turns away altogether from the project of transcendental hermeneutic phenomenology. The project of illuminating the a priori conditions on the basis of which entities show up as intelligible to us is still at the heart of things.")

Heidegger himself frequently used the term to refer to the shift announced at the end of Being and Time from "being and time" to "time and being". However, he rejected the existence of the "sharp 'about turn'" posited by some interpreters. Scholar Michael Inwood also calls attention to the fact that many of the ideas from Being and Time are retained in a different vocabulary in his later work—and also that, in other cases, a word or expression common throughout his career comes to acquire a different meaning in the later works.

This supposed shift—applied here to cover about 30 years of Heidegger's 40-year writing career—has been described by commentators from widely varied viewpoints, for instance, from dwelling (being) in the world to doing (temporality) in the world. This aspect, in particular the 1951 essay "Building Dwelling Thinking", has influenced several architectural theorists.

Other interpreters believe the Turn can be overstated or does not exist at all. For instance, Thomas Sheehan believes this supposed change is "far less dramatic than usually suggested", and entails merely a change in focus and method. Mark Wrathall argued that the Turn is not found in Heidegger's writings, but is simply a misconception.

Some notable later works are "The Origin of the Work of Art" (1935), Contributions to Philosophy (1936–38), "Letter on Humanism" (1946), "Building Dwelling Thinking" (1951), "The Question Concerning Technology" (1954), and What Is Called Thinking? (1954).

=== The history of being ===
The idea of asking about being may be traced back via Aristotle to Parmenides. Heidegger claims to revive this question of being that had been largely forgotten by the metaphysical tradition extending from Plato to Descartes, a forgetfulness extending into the Age of Enlightenment, as well as modern science and technology. In pursuit of the retrieval of the question, Heidegger spends considerable time reflecting on ancient Greek thought, in particular on Plato, Parmenides, Heraclitus, and Anaximander.

In his later philosophy, Heidegger attempts to reconstruct the "history of being" in order to show how the different epochs in the history of philosophy were dominated by different conceptions of being. His goal is to retrieve the original experience of being present in the early Greek thought that was covered up by later philosophers.

According to W. Julian Korab-Karpowicz, Heidegger believed "the thinking of Heraclitus and Parmenides, which lies at the origin of philosophy, was falsified and misinterpreted" by Plato and Aristotle, thus tainting all of subsequent Western philosophy. In his Introduction to Metaphysics, Heidegger states, "Among the most ancient Greek thinkers, it is Heraclitus who was subjected to the most fundamentally un-Greek misinterpretation in the course of Western history, and who nevertheless in more recent times has provided the strongest impulses toward redisclosing what is authentically Greek."

Charles Guignon writes that Heidegger aims to correct this misunderstanding by reviving Presocratic notions of being with an emphasis on "understanding the way beings show up in (and as) an unfolding happening or event." Guignon adds that "we might call this alternative outlook 'event ontology.'"

=== Language ===
In Being and Time, language is presented as logically secondary to Dasein's understanding of the world and its significance. On this conception of worldhood, language can develop from prelinguistic significance.

Post-turn, Heidegger refines his position to present some basic words (e.g., phusis, the Greek term that roughly translates to "nature") as world-disclosive, that is, as establishing the foundational parameters in terms of which Dasein's understanding can occur in the specific ways that it does. It is in this context that Heidegger proclaims that "Language is the house of being."

In the present age, he says, the language of "technology", or instrumental reason, flatten the significance of our world. For salvation, he turns to poetry.

Heidegger rejected the notion of language being purely a means of communication. Language construed as such, he believed, would form the basis of an age of technology, the digital thought processes of which would only use language to organise and communicate the coverage of that which exists. Thinking in terms of calculation and digital processing would put man at odds with language, at the centre of everything that exists. If man would believe that they would have language at their disposal, that they would be the one to use it, then, Heidegger believed, man would completely miss the core tenet of language itself: "It is language that speaks, not man. Man only speaks if they neatly correspond to language." In this way, Heidegger wanted to point out that man is only a participant of language that they have not themselves created. Man is bound within a sort of process of transfer and may only act with respect to anything the language conveys.

In this, however, Heidegger does not think in terms of philosophy of culture: The tautology of the formulation "language speaks" (originally in German "die Sprache spricht") is his way of trying to prevent the phenomenon of language to be used with respect to anything else than language itself. In line with his unique thinking, he is seeking to avoid having to justify the language by anything else. In this way, language could for instance never be explained by the sheer transmission of acoustic sounds, or speaking. According to Heidegger, language is rather difficult to fathom because we are too close to it, hence we need to speak about that which usually remains unmentioned because it is just too close to us. His work "Unterwegs zur Sprache" (On the way to language) is an attempt to reach "a place we already are in."

=== Influences ===
==== Early influences ====
Edmund Husserl, the founder of phenomenology, was Heidegger's teacher and a major influence on his thought. While the specific lines of influence remain a matter of scholarly dispute, one thing is clear: Heidegger's early work on Being and Time moved away from Husserl's theory of intentionality to focus on the pre-theoretical conditions that enable consciousness to grasp objects.

Aristotle influenced Heidegger from an early age. This influence was mediated through Catholic theology, medieval philosophy, and Franz Brentano. According to scholar Michael Wheeler, it is by way of a "radical rethinking" of Aristotle's Metaphysics that Heidegger supplants Husserl's notion of intentionality with his unitary notion of being-in-the-world. According to this reinterpretation, the various modes of being are united in more basic capacity of taking-as or making-present-to.

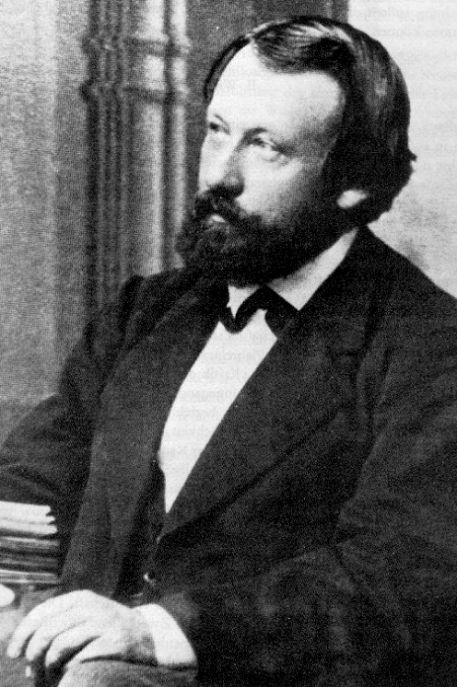
Dilthey, c. 1855

The works of Wilhelm Dilthey shaped Heidegger's very early project of developing a "hermeneutics of factical life", and his hermeneutical transformation of phenomenology. (Note: In The Genesis of Heidegger's Being and Time, Theodor Kisiel designates the first version of the project that culminates in Being and Time, "the Dilthey draft".) There is little doubt that Heidegger seized upon Dilthey's concept of hermeneutics. Heidegger's novel ideas about ontology required a gestalt formation, not merely a series of logical arguments, in order to demonstrate his fundamentally new paradigm of thinking, and the hermeneutic circle offered a new and powerful tool for the articulation and realization of these ideas.

Søren Kierkegaard contributed much to Heidegger's treatment of the existentialist aspects of his thought located in Division II of Being and Time. Heidegger's concepts of anxiety (Angst) and mortality draw on Kierkegaard and are indebted to the way in which the latter lays out the importance of our subjective relation to truth, our existence in the face of death, the temporality of existence, and the importance of passionate affirmation of one's individual being-in-the-world.

==== Later influences ====
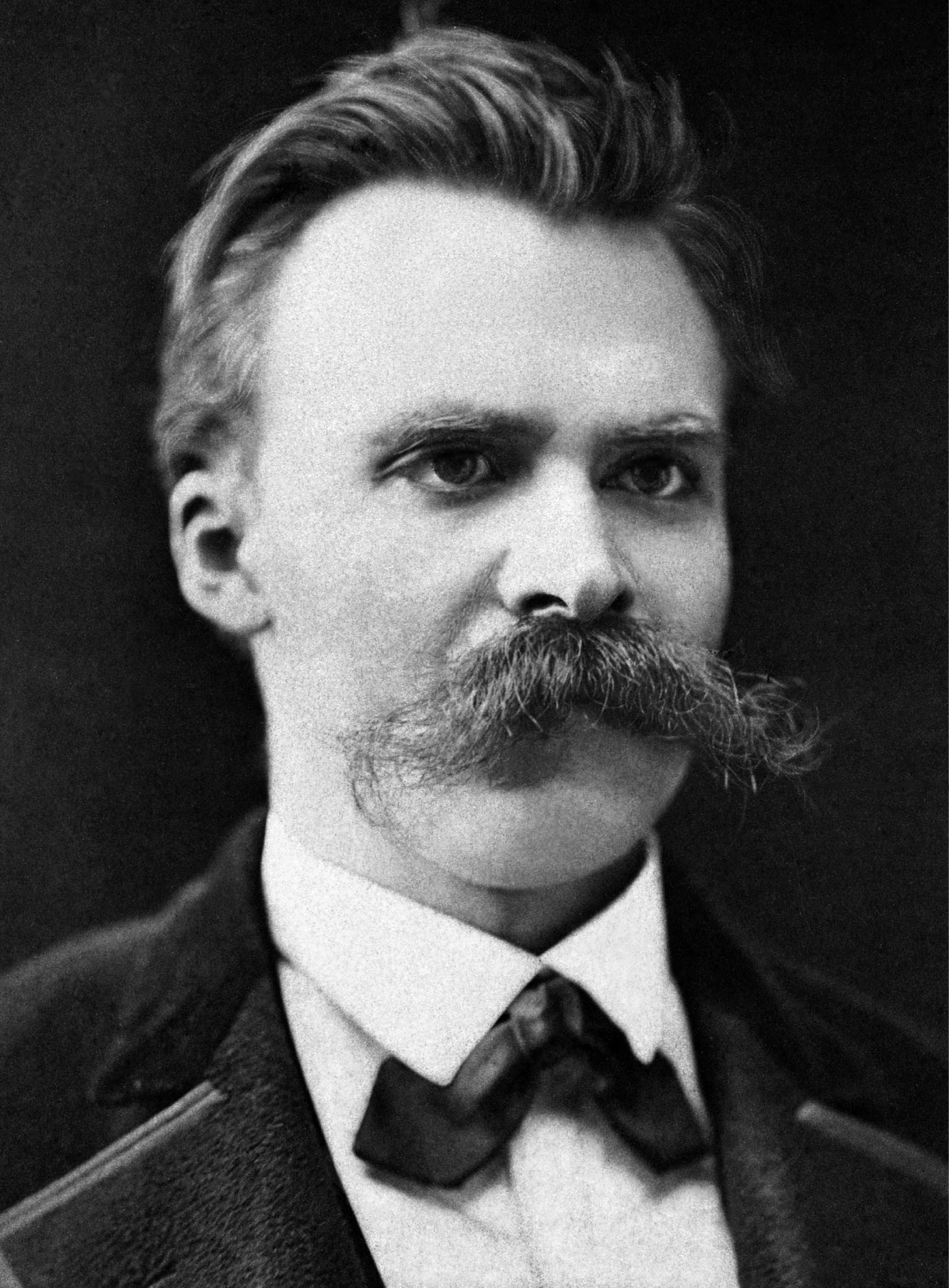
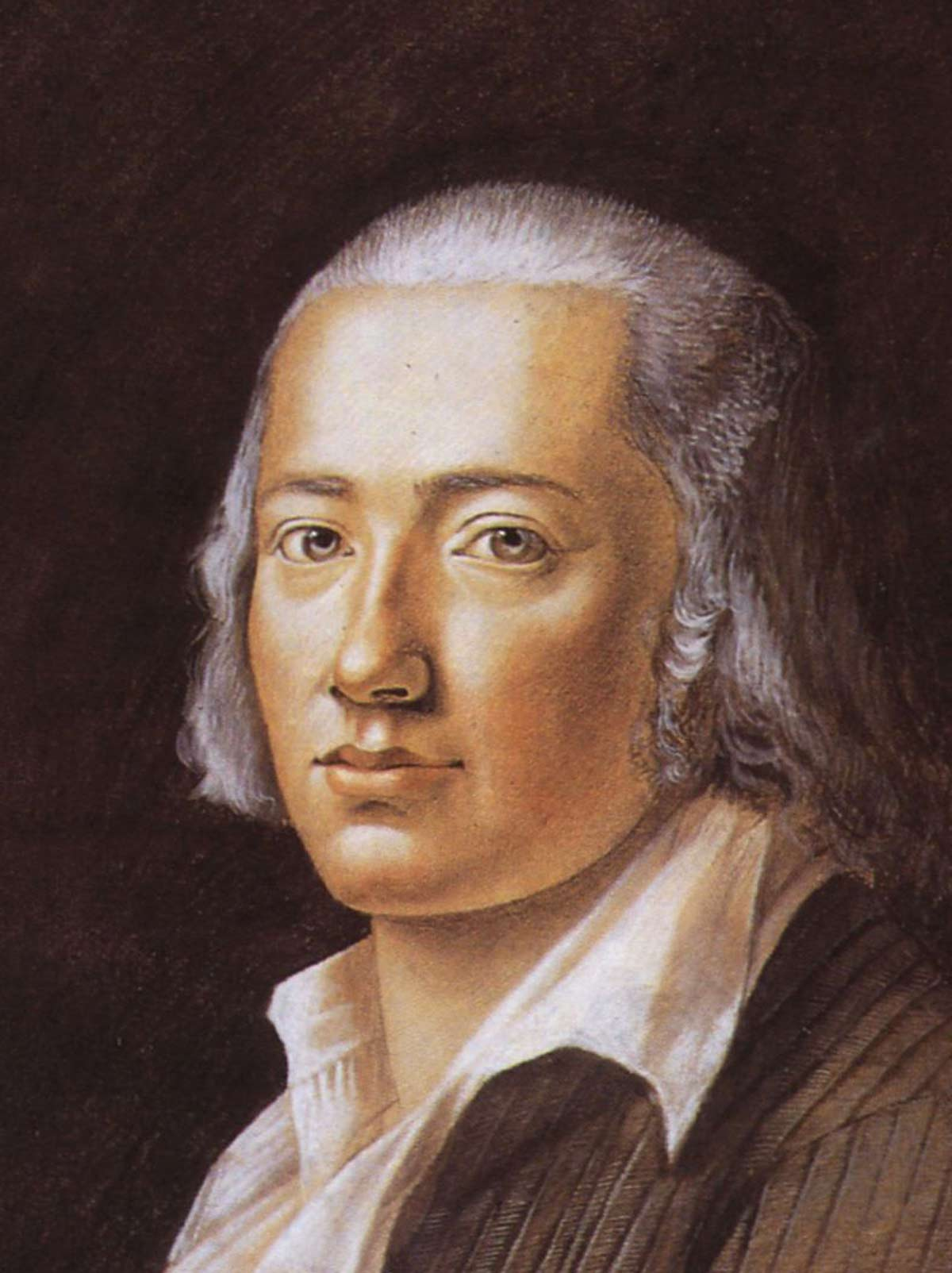
Heidegger dedicated many of his lectures to both Nietzsche and Hölderlin.

Friedrich Nietzsche and Friedrich Hölderlin were both important influences on Heidegger, and many of his lecture courses were devoted to one or the other, especially in the 1930s and 1940s. The lectures on Nietzsche focused on fragments posthumously published under the title The Will to Power, rather than on Nietzsche's published works. Heidegger reads The Will to Power as the culminating expression of Western metaphysics, and the lectures are a kind of dialogue between the two thinkers.

Michael Allen Gillespie says that Heidegger's theoretical acceptance of "destiny" has much in common with the millenarianism of Marxism. But Marxists believe Heidegger's "theoretical acceptance is antagonistic to practical political activity and implies fascism". Gillespie, however, says "the real danger" from Heidegger is not quietism but fanaticism. Modernity has cast mankind toward a new goal "on the brink of profound nihilism" that is "so alien it requires the construction of a new tradition to make it comprehensible."

Gillespie extrapolates from Heidegger's writings that humankind may degenerate into "scientists, workers, and brutes". According to Gillespie, Heidegger envisaged this abyss to be the greatest event in the history of the West because it might enable humanity to comprehend being more profoundly and primordially than the Presocratics.

The poetry of Friedrich Hölderlin became an increasingly central focus of Heidegger's later work and thought. Heidegger grants Hölderlin a singular place within the history of being and the history of Germany, as a herald whose thought is yet to be "heard" in Germany or the West more generally. Many of Heidegger's works from the 1930s onwards include meditations on lines from Hölderlin's poetry, and several of the lecture courses are devoted to the reading of a single poem; for example, Hölderlin's Hymn "The Ister".

=== Reception ===
==== Influence ====
Heidegger is often considered to be among the most important and influential philosophers of the 20th century by many observers. American Philosopher Richard Rorty has ranked Heidegger as among the most important philosophers along with John Dewey and Ludwig Wittgenstein. Simon Critchley has praised Heidegger as the "most important and influential philosopher in the continental tradition in the 20th century".

Slovenian philosopher Slavoj Žižek has referred to Heidegger as a "great philosopher" and rejected the notion that his alleged anti-semitism against him tainted his philosophy. While he acknowledges and criticizes the ways Nazism permeated Heidegger's work and his life, Žižek contends that these influences are neither essential to describing Heideggerian philosophy nor sufficient in dismantling it. Instead, Žižek finds that a blatant dismissal deprives opportunities to investigate the contradiction between Heidegger's principles and practices, as well as to "confront the uneasy questions he raised against such basic tenets of modernity as 'humanism', 'democracy', 'progress', etc." Žižek adds that the greatness he perceives in Heidegger's work is the extent to which its core ideas can survive as it is abstracted from historical context and reimagined in later eras.

In France, there is a very long and particular history of reading and interpreting Heidegger's work. Because Heidegger's discussion of ontology is sometimes interpreted as rooted in an analysis of the mode of existence of individual human beings (Dasein), his work has often been associated with existentialism. Derrida sees deconstruction is a tradition inherited via Heidegger (the French term "déconstruction" is a term coined to translate Heidegger's use of the words "Destruktion"—literally "destruction"—and "Abbau"—more literally "de-building"). The influence of Heidegger on Sartre's 1943 Being and Nothingness is marked. Heidegger himself, however, argued that Sartre had misread his work.

Hubert Dreyfus introduced Heidegger's notion of "being-in-the-world" to research in Artificial intelligence. According to Dreyfus, long-standing research questions such as the Frame problem can be only dissolved within an Heideggerian framework. Heidegger also profoundly influenced Enactivism and Situated robotics.

Some writers on Heidegger's work see possibilities within it for dialogue with traditions of thought outside of Western philosophy, particularly East Asian thinking. Despite perceived differences between Eastern and Western philosophy, some of Heidegger's later work, particularly "A Dialogue on Language between a Japanese and an Inquirer", does show an interest in initiating such a dialogue. Heidegger himself had contact with a number of leading Japanese intellectuals, including members of the Kyoto School, notably Hajime Tanabe and Kuki Shūzō. The scholar Chang Chung-Yuan stated, "Heidegger is the only Western Philosopher who not only intellectually understands Tao, but has intuitively experienced the essence of it as well." Philosopher Reinhard May sees great influence of Taoism and Japanese scholars in Heidegger's work, although this influence is not acknowledged by the author. He asserts it can be shown that Heidegger sometimes "appropriated wholesale and almost verbatim major ideas from the German translations of Daoist and Zen Buddhist classics." To this he adds, "This clandestine textual appropriation of non-Western spirituality, the extent of which has gone undiscovered for so long, seems quite unparalleled, with far-reaching implications for our future interpretation of Heidegger's work."

Notable figures known to be influenced by Heidegger's work today include Aleksandr Dugin, a prominent Russian far-right political philosopher and Trump's former chief strategist Steve Bannon.

==== Criticism ====
According to Husserl, Being and Time claimed to deal with ontology, but only did so in the first few pages of the book. Having nothing further to contribute to an ontology independent of human existence, Heidegger changed the topic to Dasein. Whereas Heidegger argued that the question of human existence is central to the pursuit of the question of being, Husserl criticized this as reducing phenomenology to "philosophical anthropology" and offering an abstract and incorrect portrait of the human being. Aspects of his work have been criticized by those who acknowledge his influence. Some questions raised about Heidegger's philosophy include the priority of ontology, the status of animals, the nature of the religious, Heidegger's supposed neglect of ethics (Emmanuel Levinas), the body (Maurice Merleau-Ponty), sexual difference (Luce Irigaray), and space (Peter Sloterdijk). A. J. Ayer objected that Heidegger proposed vast, overarching theories regarding existence that were completely unverifiable through empirical demonstration and logical analysis.

In 1929, the neo-Kantian Ernst Cassirer and Heidegger engaged in an influential debate, during the Second Davos Hochschulkurs in Davos, concerning the significance of Kantian notions of freedom and rationality. Whereas Cassirer defended the role of rationality in Kant, Heidegger argued for the priority of the imagination. The reception of Heidegger's philosophy by Anglo-American analytic philosophy, beginning with the logical positivists, was almost uniformly negative. Rudolf Carnap accused Heidegger of offering an "illusory" ontology, criticizing him for committing the fallacy of reification and for wrongly dismissing the logical treatment of language which, according to Carnap, can only lead to writing "nonsensical pseudo-propositions".

Hegelian-Marxist thinkers, especially György Lukács and the Frankfurt School, associated the style and content of Heidegger's thought with irrationalism and criticized its political implications. For instance, Theodor Adorno wrote an extended critique of the ideological character of Heidegger's early and later use of language in the Jargon of Authenticity, and Jürgen Habermas admonishes the influence of Heidegger on recent French philosophy in his polemic against "postmodernism" in The Philosophical Discourse of Modernity.

Bertrand Russell considered Heidegger an obscurantist, writing, "Highly eccentric in its terminology, his philosophy is extremely obscure. One cannot help suspecting that language is here running riot. An interesting point in his speculations is the insistence that nothingness is something positive. As with much else in Existentialism, this is a psychological observation made to pass for logic." According to Richard Polt, this quote expresses the sentiments of many 20th-century analytic philosophers concerning Heidegger.

== Personal life ==
Heidegger married Elfride Petri on 21 March 1917 in a Catholic ceremony officiated by his friend Engelbert Krebs, and a week later in a Protestant ceremony in the presence of her parents. Their first son, Jörg, was born in 1919. Elfride then gave birth to Hermann in August 1920. Heidegger knew that he was not Hermann's biological father, but raised him as his son. Hermann's biological father, who became godfather to his son, was family friend and doctor Friedel Caesar. Hermann was told of this at the age of 14; Hermann grew up to become a historian and would later serve as the executor of Heidegger's will.

In the same year that he married his wife, Heidegger began a decades-long correspondence with her friend Elisabeth Blochmann. They were romantically involved in the summer of 1929. Blochmann was Jewish, which raises questions in light of Heidegger's later membership in the Nazi Party.

In 1925, a 35-year-old Heidegger began what would be a four-year affair with Hannah Arendt, who was then 19 years old and his student. Like Blochmann, Arendt was Jewish. Heidegger and Arendt agreed to keep the details of the relationship a secret, preserving their letters, but keeping them unavailable.

Heidegger had an active social life and interacted with numerous influential philosophers, authors, and academics. During his career he established relationships with Karl Jaspers, Ernst Jünger, Hans-Georg Gadamer, Paul Tillich, Rudolf Bultmann, and Hannah Arendt. He corresponded with Carl Schmitt, who like Heidegger joined the Nazi party in 1933 and they served together in the Academy for German Law.

=== Heidegger and the Nazi Party ===
==== The rectorate ====
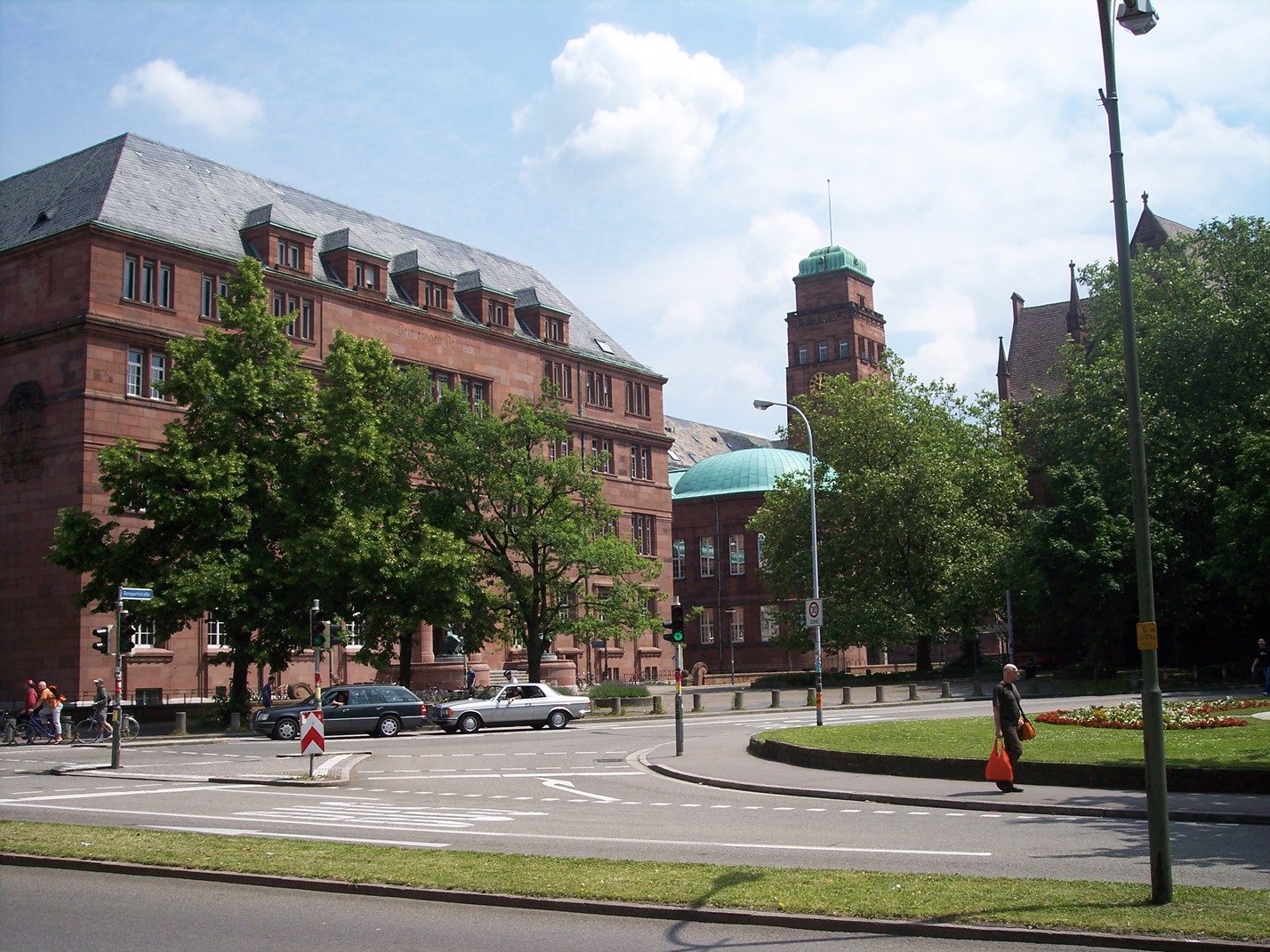
The University of Freiburg, where Heidegger was Rector from 21 April 1933 to 23 April 1934

Adolf Hitler was sworn in as Chancellor of Germany on 30 January 1933. Heidegger was elected rector of the University of Freiburg on 21 April 1933, and assumed the position the following day. On 1 May, he joined the Nazi Party.

Beginning in February 1933 Heidegger was active, alongside Ernst Krieck, in an organization known as the Cultural-Political Working Group of German University Instructors (Kulturpolitische Arbeitsgemeinschaft deutscher Hochschullehrer). The group met privately in the Spring of 1933 to plan the Nazification of the German university system.

On 27 May 1933, Heidegger delivered his inaugural address, the Rektoratsrede (titled "The Self-assertion of the German University"), in a hall decorated with swastikas, with members of the Sturmabteilung (SA) and prominent Nazi Party officials present.

That summer he delivered a lecture on a fragment of Heraclitus (usually translated in English: "War is the father of all"). His notes on this lecture appear under the heading "Struggle as the essence of Beings." In this lecture he suggests that if an enemy cannot be found for the people then one must be invented, and once conceptualized and identified, then the 'beings' who have discovered or invented this enemy must strive for the total annihilation of the enemy.

His tenure as rector was fraught with difficulties from the outset. Some Nazi education officials viewed him as a rival, while others saw his efforts as comical. Some of Heidegger's fellow Nazis also ridiculed his philosophical writings as gibberish. He finally offered his resignation as rector on 23 April 1934, and it was accepted on 27 April. Heidegger remained a member of both the academic faculty and of the Nazi Party until the end of the war.

Philosophical historian Hans Sluga wrote, "Though as rector he prevented students from displaying an anti-Semitic poster at the entrance to the university and from holding a book burning, he kept in close contact with the Nazi student leaders and clearly signaled to them his sympathy with their activism."

In 1945, Heidegger wrote of his term as rector, giving the writing to his son Hermann; it was published in 1983:

The rectorate was an attempt to see something in the movement that had come to power, beyond all its failings and crudeness, that was much more far-reaching and that could perhaps one day bring a concentration on the Germans' Western historical essence. It will in no way be denied that at the time I believed in such possibilities and for that reason renounced the actual vocation of thinking in favor of being effective in an official capacity. In no way will what was caused by my own inadequacy in office be played down. But these points of view do not capture what is essential and what moved me to accept the rectorate.

===== Treatment of Husserl =====
Beginning in 1917, German-Jewish philosopher Edmund Husserl championed Heidegger's work, and helped Heidegger become his successor for the chair in philosophy at the University of Freiburg in 1928.

On 6 April 1933, the Gauleiter of Baden Province, Robert Wagner, suspended all Jewish government employees, including present and retired faculty at the University of Freiburg. Heidegger's predecessor as rector formally notified Husserl of his "enforced leave of absence" on 14 April 1933.

Heidegger became Rector of the University of Freiburg on 22 April 1933. The following week the national Reich law of 28 April 1933 replaced Reichskommissar Wagner's decree. The Reich law required the firing of Jewish professors from German universities, including those, such as Husserl, who had converted to Christianity. The termination of Husserl's academic privileges thus did not involve any specific action on Heidegger's part.

Heidegger had by then broken off contact with Husserl, other than through intermediaries. Heidegger later claimed that his relationship with Husserl had already become strained after Husserl publicly "settled accounts" with Heidegger and Max Scheler in the early 1930s.

Heidegger did not attend his former mentor's cremation in 1938, for which he later declared himself regretful: "That I failed to express again to Husserl my gratitude and respect for him upon the occasion of his final illness and death is a human failure that I apologized for in a letter to Mrs. Husserl." In 1941, under pressure from publisher Max Niemeyer, Heidegger agreed to remove the dedication to Husserl from Being and Time (restored in post-war editions).

Heidegger's behavior towards Husserl has provoked controversy. Hannah Arendt initially suggested that Heidegger's behavior precipitated Husserl's death, calling Heidegger a "potential murderer". However, she later recanted her accusation.

==== Post-rectorate period ====
After the failure of Heidegger's rectorship, he withdrew from most political activity, but remained a member of the Nazi Party. In May 1934 he accepted a position on the Committee for the Philosophy of Law in the Academy for German Law, where he remained active until at least 1936. The academy had official consultant status in preparing Nazi legislation such as the Nuremberg racial laws that came into effect in 1935. In addition to Heidegger, such Nazi notables as Hans Frank, Julius Streicher, Carl Schmitt, and Alfred Rosenberg belonged to the Academy and served on this committee.

In a 1935 lecture, later published in 1953 as part of the book Introduction to Metaphysics, Heidegger refers to the "inner truth and greatness" of the Nazi movement, but he then adds a qualifying statement in parentheses: "namely, the confrontation of planetary technology and modern humanity". However, it subsequently transpired that this qualification had not been made during the original lecture, although Heidegger claimed that it had been. This has led scholars to argue that Heidegger still supported the Nazi party in 1935 but that he did not want to admit this after the war, and the inclusion of this detail attempted to silently correct his earlier statement. (Note: See also J. Habermas, "Martin Heidegger: on the publication of the lectures of 1935", in Richard Wolin, ed., The Heidegger Controversy (MIT Press, 1993). The controversial page of the 1935 manuscript is missing from the Heidegger Archives in Marbach; however, Habermas's scholarship leaves little doubt about the original wording.)

In private notes written in 1939, Heidegger took a strongly critical view of Hitler's ideology; however, in public lectures, he seems to have continued to make ambiguous comments which, if they expressed criticism of the regime, did so only in the context of praising its ideals. For instance, in a 1942 lecture, published posthumously, Heidegger said of recent German classics scholarship, "In the majority of 'research results,' the Greeks appear as pure National Socialists. This overenthusiasm on the part of academics seems not even to notice that with such 'results' it does National Socialism and its historical uniqueness no service at all, not that it needs this anyhow."

An important witness to Heidegger's continued allegiance to Nazism during the post-rectorship period is his former student Karl Löwith, who met Heidegger in 1936 while Heidegger was visiting Rome. In an account set down in 1940 (though not intended for publication), Löwith recalled that Heidegger wore a swastika pin to their meeting, though Heidegger knew that Löwith was Jewish. Löwith also recalled that Heidegger "left no doubt about his faith in Hitler", and stated that his support for Nazism was in agreement with the essence of his philosophy.

Heidegger rejected the "biologically grounded racism" of the Nazis, replacing it with linguistic-historical heritage.

==== Post-war period ====
After the end of World War II, Heidegger was summoned to appear at a denazification hearing. He was charged on four counts, dismissed from the university and declared a "follower" (Mitläufer) of Nazism. Heidegger was forbidden to teach between 1945 and 1951. One consequence of this teaching ban was that Heidegger began to engage far more in the French philosophical scene.

In his postwar thinking, Heidegger distanced himself from Nazism, but his critical comments about Nazism seem scandalous to some since they tend to equate the Nazi war atrocities with other inhumane practices related to rationalization and industrialisation, including the treatment of animals by factory farming. For instance, in a lecture delivered at Bremen in 1949, Heidegger said: "Agriculture is now a motorized food industry, the same thing in its essence as the production of corpses in the gas chambers and the extermination camps, the same thing as blockades and the reduction of countries to famine, the same thing as the manufacture of hydrogen bombs."

In 1967 Heidegger met with the Jewish poet Paul Celan, a concentration camp survivor. Having kept in correspondence with each other since 1956, Celan visited Heidegger at his country retreat and wrote an enigmatic poem about the meeting, which some interpret as Celan's wish for Heidegger to apologize for his behavior during the Nazi era.

Heidegger's defenders, notably Arendt, see his support for Nazism as arguably a personal "error" (a word which Arendt placed in quotation marks when referring to Heidegger's Nazi-era politics). Defenders think this error was irrelevant to Heidegger's philosophy. Critics such as Levinas, Karl Löwith, and Theodor Adorno claim that Heidegger's support for Nazism revealed flaws inherent in his thought.

===== Der Spiegel interview =====
On 23 September 1966, Heidegger was interviewed by Georg Wolff, a former Nazi, and Rudolf Augstein for Der Spiegel magazine, in which he agreed to discuss his political past provided that the interview be published posthumously. ("Only a God Can Save Us" was published five days after his death, on 31 May 1976.) In the interview, Heidegger defended his entanglement with Nazism in two ways. First, he claimed that there was no alternative, saying that with his acceptance of the position of rector of the University of Freiburg he was trying to save the university (and science in general) from being politicized and thus had to compromise with the Nazi administration. Second, he admitted that he saw an "awakening" (Aufbruch) which might help to find a "new national and social approach", but said that he changed his mind about this in 1934, when he refused, under threat of dismissal, to remove from the position of dean of the faculty those who were not acceptable to the Nazi party, and he consequently decided to resign as rector.

In his interview Heidegger defended as double-speak his 1935 lecture describing the "inner truth and greatness of this movement". He affirmed that Nazi informants who observed his lectures would understand that by "movement" he meant Nazism. However, Heidegger asserted that his dedicated students would know this statement was not praise for the Nazi Party. Rather, he meant it as he expressed it in the parenthetical clarification later added to Introduction to Metaphysics (1953), namely, "the confrontation of planetary technology and modern humanity".

The eyewitness account of Löwith from 1940 contradicts the account given in Der Spiegel interview in two ways: that Heidegger did not make any decisive break with Nazism in 1934, and that he was willing to entertain more profound relations between his philosophy and political involvement. The Spiegel interviewers did not bring up Heidegger's 1949 quotation comparing the industrialization of agriculture to the extermination camps. In fact, the interviewers were not in possession of much of the evidence now known for Heidegger's Nazi sympathies. (Note: The 1966 interview published in 1976 after Heidegger's death as "Only a God Can Save Us". Der Spiegel. Translated by William J. Richardson. 31 May 1976. pp. 193–219. For critical readings, see the "Special Feature on Heidegger and Nazism". Critical Inquiry. 15 (2) (Winter 1989 ed.). 1989. doi:10.1086/ci.15.2.1343581, particularly the contributions by Jürgen Habermas and Blanchot. The issue includes partial translations of Jacques Derrida's Of Spirit and Philippe Lacoue-Labarthe's Heidegger, Art, and Politics: the Fiction of the Political.) Furthermore, Der Spiegel journalist Georg Wolff had been an SS-Hauptsturmführer with the Sicherheitsdienst, stationed in Oslo during World War II, and had been writing articles with antisemitic and racist overtones in Der Spiegel since the end of the war.

===== The Farías debate =====
Jacques Derrida, Philippe Lacoue-Labarthe, and Jean-François Lyotard, among others, all engaged in debate and disagreement about the relation between Heidegger's philosophy and his Nazi politics. These debates included the question of whether it was possible to do without Heidegger's philosophy, a position which Derrida in particular rejected. Forums where these debates took place include the proceedings of the first conference dedicated to Derrida's work, published as "Les Fins de l'homme à partir du travail de Jacques Derrida: colloque de Cerisy, 23 juillet-2 août 1980", Derrida's "Feu la cendre/cio' che resta del fuoco", and the studies on Paul Celan by Lacoue-Labarthe and Derrida, which shortly preceded the detailed studies of Heidegger's politics published in and after 1987.

===== The Black Notebooks =====
In 2014, Heidegger's Black Notebooks were published. Written between 1931 and the early 1970s, the notebooks contain several examples of antisemitic sentiments, which led to a reevaluation of Heidegger's relation to Nazism. An example of Heidegger using antisemitic language was his writing, "world Judaism is ungraspable everywhere and doesn't need to get involved in military action while continuing to unfurl its influence, whereas we are left to sacrifice the best blood of the best of our people". The concept of "world Judaism" was first promoted by the antisemitic text The Protocols of the Elders of Zion and later appeared in Hitler's Mein Kampf. In another instance, Heidegger wrote "by living according to the principle of race [Jews] had themselves promoted the very reasoning by which they were now being attacked and so they had no right to complain when it was being used against them by the Germans promoting their own racial purity". However, the notebooks also contain instances of Heidegger writing critically of biological racism and biological oppression.

A notable entry in the notebooks are his writings about his mentor and former friend Edmund Husserl, specifically relating to Husserl's Jewish heritage. In 1939, only a year after Husserl's death, Heidegger wrote in his Black Notebooks:

the occasional increase in the power of Judaism is grounded in the fact that Western metaphysics, especially in its modern evolution, offered the point of attachment for the expansion of an otherwise empty rationality and calculative capacity, and these thereby created for themselves an abode in the "spirit" without ever being able, on their own, to grasp the concealed decisive domains. The more originary and inceptual the future decisions and questions become, all the more inaccessible will they remain to this 'race.' (Thus Husserl's step to the phenomenological attitude, taken in explicit opposition to psychological explanation and to the historiological calculation of opinions, will be of lasting importance—and yet this attitude never reaches into the domains of the essential decisions [...].)

For Donatella Di Cesare, this seemed to imply that Heidegger considered Husserl to be philosophically limited by his Jewishness. Recent research confirms the deep connection between Heidegger's philosophy and völkisch antisemitism in the Black Notebooks.

== In popular culture ==
- Der Zauberer von Meßkirch (1989) is a German TV documentary about Heidegger, co-directed by Ulrich Boehm and Rüdiger Safranski.
- The film director Terrence Malick translated Heidegger's 1929 essay Vom Wesen des Grundes into English. It was published under the title The Essence of Reasons (1969). It is also frequently said of Malick that his cinema has Heideggerian sensibilities.
- The Ister (2004) is a film based on Heidegger's 1942 lecture course on Friedrich Hölderlin, and features Jean-Luc Nancy, Philippe Lacoue-Labarthe, Bernard Stiegler, and Hans-Jürgen Syberberg.
- Being in the World (2010) draws on Heidegger's work to explore what it means to be human in a technological age. A number of Heidegger scholars are interviewed, including Hubert Dreyfus, Mark Wrathall, Albert Borgmann, John Haugeland, and Taylor Carman.

== See also ==
- Daseinsanalysis
- Hermeneutic idealism
- Hölderlin's Hymn "The Ister"
- Khôra
- Object-oriented ontology
- Sous rature

== Bibliography ==
=== Works cited ===
For ease of reference, citations of Being and Time cite to the pagination of the standard German edition, which is included in the margins of both of the English translations, each of which has its virtues.

Heidegger's collected writings are published by Vittorio Klostermann. The Heidegger Gesamtausgabe was begun during Heidegger's lifetime. He defined the order of publication and dictated that the principle of editing should be "ways not works". Publication has not yet been completed. The current executor of Martin Heidegger's Literary Estate is his grandson and a lawyer, Arnulf Heidegger.

Footnotes

==== Primary sources ====
- Heidegger, Martin (1962). Being and Time. Translated by John Macquarrie and Edward Robinson. Harper Collins.
- Heidegger, Martin (1971a). "A Dialogue on Language between a Japanese and an Inquirer". On the Way to Language. Translated by Peter D. Hertz. Harper & Row.
- Heidegger, Martin (1971b). Poetry, Language, Thought. Translated by Albert Hofstadter. Albert Hofstadter.
- Heidegger, Martin (1976). What is Called Thinking?. Translated by J. Glenn Gray. Harper Perennial.
- Heidegger, Martin (1990). "Der Spiegel Interview". In Günther Neske and Emil Kettering (ed.). Martin Heidegger and National Socialism: Questions and Answers. Paragon House.
- Heidegger, Martin (1991). David Farrell Krell (ed.). Nietzsche. Translated by Stambaugh, Joan; Krell, David Farrell; Capuzzi, Frank A. HarperOne. ISBN 0-06-063841-9. OCLC 22492313.
- Heidegger, Martin (1996a). Being and Time. Translated by Joan Stambaugh. SUNY Press.
- Heidegger, Martin (1996b). Hölderlin's Hymn "The Ister". Translated by William McNeill and Julia Davis. Indiana University Press.
- Heidegger, Martin (1998). "Letter on Humanism". In William McNeil (ed.). Pathmarks. Translated by William McNeil. Cambridge University Press.
- Heidegger, Martin (2002). "Time and Being". On Time and Being. Translated by Joan Stambaugh. University of Chicago Press. ISBN 0-226-32375-7.
- Heidegger, Martin (2009). Theodore Kisiel and Thomas Sheehan (ed.). Becoming Heidegger: On the Trail of his Early Occasional Writings, 1910-1927 (2nd ed.). Routledge. ISBN 978-0-9701679-9-6.
- Heidegger, Martin (2012). Contributions to Philosophy: (Of the Event). Translated by Richard Rojcewicz. Indiana University Press. ISBN 9780253001276.
- Heidegger, Martin (2014). Introduction to Metaphysics. Translated by Gregory Fried and Richard Polt (2nd ed.). Yale University Press. ISBN 978-0-300-18612-3.
- Heidegger, Martin (2016). Mindfulness. Translated by Parvis Emad and Thomas Kalary. Bloomsbury Academic.
- Heidegger, Martin (2017). Ponderings XII–XV: Black Notebooks 1939–1941. Translated by Richard Rojcewicz. Indiana University Press. ISBN 9780253029317.

==== Secondary sources ====
- Adorno, Theodor W. (1973). The Jargon of Authenticity. Translated by Knut Tarnowski and Frederic Will. Northwestern University Press.
- Alfieri, Francesco (2015). The Presence of Duns Scotus in the Thought of Edith Stein: The question of Individuality. Springer. ISBN 978-3319156620.
- Altman, William H. F. (2012). Martin Heidegger and the First World War: Being and Time as Funeral Oration. Lexington Books. ISBN 978-0739171684.
- Assheuer, Thomas [in German] (21 March 2014). "Das vergiftete Erbe" [The poisoned heritage]. Die Zeit (in German). Archived from the original on 4 April 2023.
- Anderson, Mark M. (1 April 1991). "The 'Impossibility of Poetry': Celan and Heidegger in France". New German Critique (53): 3–18. doi:10.2307/488241. ISSN 0094-033X. JSTOR 488241.
- Augstein, Rudolf; Wolff, Georg; Heidegger, Martin (1976). "Nur noch ein Gott kann uns retten". Der Spiegel: 193–219. Archived from the original on 6 February 2013. English translation Archived 16 October 2013 at the Wayback Machine by William J. Richardson in Sheehan, Thomas, ed. (1981). Heidegger. The Man and the Thinker. Piscataway, New Jersey: Transaction Publishers. pp. 45–67. ISBN 978-1-412-81537-6.
- Bambach, Charles R. (2003). Heidegger's Roots: Nietzsche, National Socialism, and the Greeks. Cornell University Press. ISBN 978-0801472664.
- Benhabib, Seyla (2003). The Reluctant Modernism of Hannah Arendt. Rowman & Littlefield. ISBN 9780742521513.
- Carman, Taylor (2003). Heidegger's Analytic: Interpretation, Discourse and Authenticity in Being and Time. Cambridge University Press. ISBN 9781139441995.
- Carnap, Rudolf (1931). "Überwindung der Metaphysik durch logische Analyse der Sprache" (PDF). Erkenntnis. 2: 219–241. doi:10.1007/BF02028153. S2CID 144658746. Archived (PDF) from the original on 9 October 2022.
- Carnap, Rudolf (1966). "The Elimination of Metaphysics Through Logical Analysis of Language" (PDF). In A.J. Ayer (ed.). Logical Positivism. The Library of Philosophical Movements. New York: The Free Press. pp. 60–81. ISBN 978-0029011300. Archived (PDF) from the original on 9 October 2022.
- Cammann, Alexander; Soboczynski, Adam (30 January 2014). "Es ist wieder da". Die Zeit. Archived from the original on 6 May 2015.
- Cavell, Stanley (1979). The World Viewed: Reflections on the Ontology of Film, Enlarged Edition. Harvard University Press. ISBN 978-0674961968.
- Dahlstrom, D. O. (2004). "Ontology". New Catholic Encyclopedia. Gale. Archived from the original on 29 January 2021.
- Davies, Paul (11 April 2017). "Martin Heidegger (1889–1976)". Archived from the original on 26 January 2021.
- Dostal, Robert J. (1993). "Time and Phenomenology in Husserl and Heidegger". In Charles Guignon (ed.). The Cambridge Companion to Heidegger. Cambridge University Press. pp. 141–69. ISBN 0-521-38597-0.
- Dreyfus, Hubert L. (1991). Being-in-the-World: A Commentary on Heidegger's Being and Time, Division I. MIT Press.
- Elden, Stuart (2012). Sloterdijk Now. Polity. ISBN 9780745651361. Archived from the original on 21 June 2023.
- Ettinger, Elzbieta (1997). Hannah Arendt/Martin Heidegger. Yale University Press. ISBN 978-0300072549.
- Evans, Richard J. (2005). The Coming of the Third Reich. Penguin Books. pp. 419–422. ISBN 978-0143034698.
- Farin, Ingo (2016). Reading Heidegger's "Black notebooks 1931--1941. Cambridge, Massachusetts London, England: The MIT Press. ISBN 978-0262034012. Archived from the original on 1 March 2024.
- Findlay, Edward F. (2002). Caring for the Soul in a Postmodern Age: Politics and Phenomenology in the Thought of Jan Patočka. SUNY Press. ISBN 9780791454855. Archived from the original on 21 June 2023.
- Fleischacker, Samuel, ed. (August 2008). Heidegger's Jewish Followers: Essays on Hannah Arendt, Leo Strauss, Hans Jonas, and Emmanuel Levinas. Duquesne University Press. ISBN 978-0820704128.
- Fiske, Edward B. (27 May 1976). "Martin Heidegger, a Philosopher Who Affected Many Fields, Dies". The New York Times. ISSN 0362-4331.
- Gadamer, Hans Georg (1994). Heidegger's Ways. SUNY Press. ISBN 978-0791417379.
- Georgakis, Tziovanis; Ennis, Paul J. (2015). Heidegger in the Twenty-First Century. Springer. ISBN 978-9401796781.
- Gillespie, Michael Allen (1984). Hegel, Heidegger, and the Ground of History. University of Chicago Press. ISBN 9780226293769.
- Gorner, Paul (2000). Twentieth Century German Philosophy. Oxford University Press. ISBN 978-0-19-289309-3. Archived from the original on 13 November 2022.
- Gross, Daniel M.; Kemmann, Ansgar, eds. (2005). Heidegger and Rhetoric. SUNY Press. ISBN 9780791465516. Archived from the original on 29 February 2024.
- Habermas, Jürgen (1989). "Work and Weltanschauung: the Heidegger Controversy from a German Perspective". Critical Inquiry. 15 (2): 452–54. doi:10.1086/448492. S2CID 143394757.
- Habermas, Jürgen (1990). The Philosophical Discourse of Modernity: Twelve Lectures. Translated by Frederick Lawrence. MIT Press.
- Hemming, Laurence (2013). Heidegger and Marx : a productive dialogue over the language of humanism. Evanston, Ill: Northwestern University Press. ISBN 978-0810128750.
- Herrmann, Friedrich-Wilhelm von; Alfieri, Francesco (2021). Martin Heidegger and the Truth About the Black Notebooks. Springer. ISBN 978-3030694951.
- Holland, Nancy J. (2018). Heidegger and the Problem of Consciousness. Indiana University Press. ISBN 9780253035981. Archived from the original on 29 February 2024.
- Horrigan-Kelly, Marcella; Millar, Michelle; Dowling, Maura (2016). "Understanding the Key Tenets of Heidegger's Philosophy for Interpretive Phenomenological Research". International Journal of Qualitative Methods. 15 (January–December 2016: 1–8) 1609406916680634. doi:10.1177/1609406916680634. hdl:10379/7166. S2CID 152252826.
- Husserl, Edmund (1997). Psychological and transcendental phenomenology and the confrontation with Heidegger (1927–1931). Kluwer.
- Inwood, Michael (1999). A Heidegger Dictionary. Blackwell.
- Inwood, Michael (12 April 2014). "Martin Heidegger: the philosopher who fell for Hitler". The Independent. Archived from the original on 24 February 2023.
- Inwood, Michael (2019). Heidegger: A Very Short Introduction (2nd, ebook ed.). Oxford University Press. ISBN 978-0-19-256380-4.
- Janich, Oliver (2013). Die Vereinigten Staaten von Europa: Geheimdokumente enthüllen: Die dunklen Pläne der Elite. FinanzBuch Verlag. ISBN 9783862484713. Archived from the original on 29 February 2024.
- Janicaud, Dominique (2015). Heidegger in France. Indiana University Press. ISBN 978-0253017734.
- Kisiel, Theodore (1993). The Genesis of Being and Time. California University Press.
- Kisiel, Theodore J.; Buren, John Van (1994). Reading Heidegger from the Start: Essays in His Earliest Thought. State University of New York Press. ISBN 978-0791420683.
- Knowles, Adam (2019). Heidegger's Fascist Affinities: A Politics of Silence. Stanford University Press. ISBN 9781503608191.
- Krell, David Farrell (1975). "On the Manifold Meaning of Aletheia: Brentano, Aristotle, Heidegger". Research in Phenomenology. 5: 77–94. doi:10.1163/156916475x00114.
- Korab-Karpowicz, W. J. Martin Heidegger (1889—1976). Internet Encyclopedia of Philosophy. Archived from the original on 27 January 2023.
- Korab-Karpowicz, W. Julian (2016). The Presocratics in the Thought of Martin Heidegger. Peter Lang. ISBN 978-3631712917.
- Lambert, Cesar (2007). "Some considerations about the correspondence between Martin Heidegger and Bernhard Welte". Revista de Filosofía. 63: 157–169. doi:10.4067/S0718-43602007000100012.
- Laozi (2013). Tao - a New Way of Thinking: A Translation of the Tao Tê Ching with an Introduction and Commentaries. Jessica Kingsley Publishers. ISBN 978-1848192010.
- Löwith, Karl (1989). Mein Leben in Deutschland vor und nach 1933: Ein Bericht. Frankfurt am Main: Fischer Taschenbuch Verlag. ISBN 3-596-25677-1.
- Luft, Sebastian (2015). The Neo-Kantian Reader. Routledge. ISBN 978-0415452526.
- Lyon, James K. (2006). Paul Celan and Martin Heidegger: An Unresolved Conversation, 1951–1970. JHU Press. ISBN 978-0801883026.
- Ma, Lin (2007). Heidegger on East-West Dialogue: Anticipating the Event. Routledge. ISBN 9781135908690. Archived from the original on 22 August 2023.
- Maier-Katkin, Daniel (2010). Stranger from Abroad: Hannah Arendt, Martin Heidegger, Friendship and Forgiveness. W. W. Norton & Company. ISBN 978-0393068337.
- May, Reinhard (1996). Heidegger's Hidden Sources: East Asian Influences on His Work. Psychology Press. ISBN 978-0415140386.
- McGrath, S. J. (2008). Heidegger: A (Very) Critical Introduction. Wm. B. Eerdmans. ISBN 978-0802860071.
- Murray, Michael (1978). Heidegger and Modern Philosophy: Critical Essays. Yale University Press. ISBN 978-0300022360.
- Moran, Dermot (2000). "Heidegger's Critique of Husserl's and Brentano's Accounts of Intentionality". Inquiry. 43 (1): 39–65. doi:10.1080/002017400321361. S2CID 54834191.
- Nelson, Eric S. (2014). "Heidegger and Dilthey: Language, History, and Hermeneutics", in Horizons of Authenticity in Phenomenology, Existentialism, and Moral Psychology, edited by Hans Pedersen and Megan Altman. Dordrecht: Springer. pp. 109–28. ISBN 978-9401794411.
- Neske, Gunther; Kettering, Emil (1990). Martin Heidegger and National Socialism: Questions and Answers. Paragon House. ISBN 978-1557783103.
- Nirenberg, David (13 January 2011). "When Philosophy Mattered". The New Republic. Archived from the original on 23 July 2020.
- Oldmeadow, Harry (2004). Journeys East: 20th Century Western Encounters with Eastern Religious Traditions. World Wisdom. ISBN 9780941532570. Archived from the original on 29 February 2024.
- Ormiston, Gayle L.; Schrift, Alan D. (January 1990). Transforming the Hermeneutic Context: From Nietzsche to Nancy. SUNY Press. ISBN 9780791401347. Archived from the original on 29 November 2022.
- Patterson, Hannah, ed. (2003). The Cinema of Terrence Malick: Poetic Visions of America. Wallflower. ISBN 978-1903364765.
- Payen, Guillaume (2023). Martin Heidegger's Changing Destinies. Catholicism, Revolution, Nazism. Yale University Press. ISBN 978-0-300-27170-6.
- Polt, Richard F. H. (1999). Heidegger: An Introduction. Cornell University Press.
- Polt, Richard; Fried, Gregory (2001). A Companion to Heidegger's Introduction to Metaphysics. Yale University Press. ISBN 978-0300085235.
- Raffoul, Francois; Nelson, Eric S. (2013). The Bloomsbury Companion to Heidegger. A&C Black. ISBN 9781441199850. Archived from the original on 5 July 2023.
- Richardson, William J. (1963). Heidegger. Through Phenomenology to Thought. Preface by Martin Heidegger. The Hague: Martinus Nijhoff Publishers. 4th Edition Archived 21 June 2023 at the Wayback Machine (2003). The Bronx: Fordham University Press. ISBN 0-823-22255-1; ISBN 978-08-2322-255-1.
- Rockmore, Tom (1992). On Heidegger's Nazism and Philosophy. University of California Press. ISBN 978-0520077119.
- Rockmore, Tom (2003). "Dilthey and Historical Reason". Revue Internationale de Philosophie. 226 (4): 477–494. doi:10.3917/rip.226.0477. JSTOR 23955847. S2CID 170687756.
- Russell, Bertrand (1959). Wisdom of the West; a historical survey of Western philosophy in its social and political setting. Garden City, N.Y.: Doubleday. p. 303. OCLC 368395.
- Safranski, Rüdiger (1998). Martin Heidegger: Between Good and Evil. Translated by Ewald Osers. Harvard University Press.
- Sandkühler, Hans Jörg (2010). "Ontologie". Enzyklopädie Philosophie. Meiner. Archived from the original on 11 March 2021.
- Schalow, Frank; Denker, Alfred (2010). Historical Dictionary of Heidegger's Philosophy. Scarecrow Press.
- Sharpe, Matthew (2018). "Rhetorical Action in Rektoratsrede: Calling Heidegger's Gefolgschaft". Philosophy & Rhetoric. 51 (2): 176–201. doi:10.5325/philrhet.51.2.0176. S2CID 149519358.
- Sheehan, Thomas (16 June 1988). "Heidegger and the Nazis" (PDF). The New York Review of Books. Vol. 35, no. 10. pp. 38–47. Archived from the original on 7 November 2011.
- Sluga, Hans (2013). Heidegger's Crisis. Harvard University Press. ISBN 978-0674365070.
- Steinfels, Peter (27 December 1995). "Emmanuel Levinas, 90, French Ethical Philosopher". The New York Times. Archived from the original on 21 June 2023.
- Taylor, Charles (1993). "Engaged Agency and Background". In Charles Guignon (ed.). The Cambridge Companion to Heidegger. Cambridge University Press. pp. 317–36. ISBN 0-521-38597-0.
- Varga, Somogy; Guignon, Charles (11 September 2014). "Authenticity". In Edward N. Zalta (ed.). Stanford Encyclopedia of Philosophy (2020 ed.). Archived from the original on 1 March 2024.
- Wheeler, Michael (2020). "Martin Heidegger". In Edward N. Zalta (ed.). Stanford Encyclopedia of Philosophy (2020 ed.). Archived from the original on 30 June 2022.
- Whittingham, Matthew (2018). The Self and Social Relations. Springer. ISBN 978-3-319-77246-2.
- Wolin, Richard (1991). The Heidegger Controversy: A Critical Reader. Columbia University Press. ISBN 978-0231075961.
- Wolin, Richard (2015). Heidegger's Children: Hannah Arendt, Karl Löwith, Hans Jonas, and Herbert Marcuse. Princeton University Press. ISBN 9780691168616.
- Wolin, Richard (2023). Heidegger in ruins: between philosophy and ideology. Yale University Press. ISBN 978-0-300-26913-0.
- Wrathall, Mark (2010). Heidegger and Unconcealment: Truth, Language, and History. Cambridge University Press.
- Young, Julian (1998). Heidegger, Philosophy, Nazism. Cambridge University Press. ISBN 978-0521644945.
- Young-Bruehl, Elisabeth (January 2004). Hannah Arendt: For Love of the World. Yale University Press. ISBN 978-0300105889.
- Zimmerman, Michael E. (1981). Eclipse of the Self: The Development of Heidegger's Concept of Authenticity. Ohio University Press. ISBN 978-0821405703.
- Zuckert, Catherine (1991). "The Politics of Derridean Deconstruction". Polity. 23 (3): 335–356. doi:10.2307/3235130. JSTOR 3235130. S2CID 147001554. Archived from the original on 6 September 2023.
