= Elisabeth Blochmann =

German academic (1892–1972)

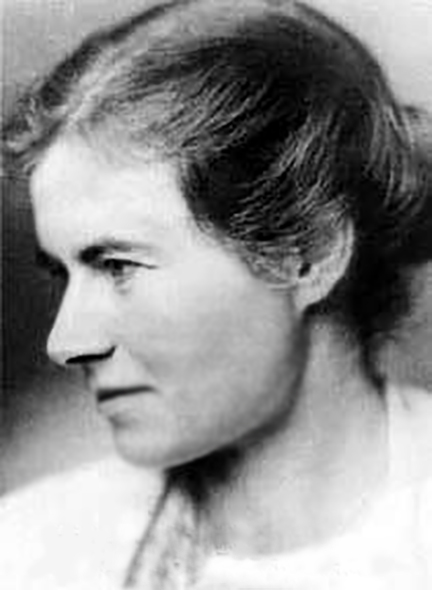
- Born: 14 April 1892; Apolda, Saxe-Weimar-Eisenach, German Empire
- Died: 27 January 1972 (aged 79); Marburg, Hesse, West Germany
- Education: University of Strasbourg; University of Marburg; University of Gottingen
- Occupation: Professor of education
- Movement: Social pedagogy, German youth movement
- Awards: Goethe-Plakette des Landes Hessen (1962)

Signature
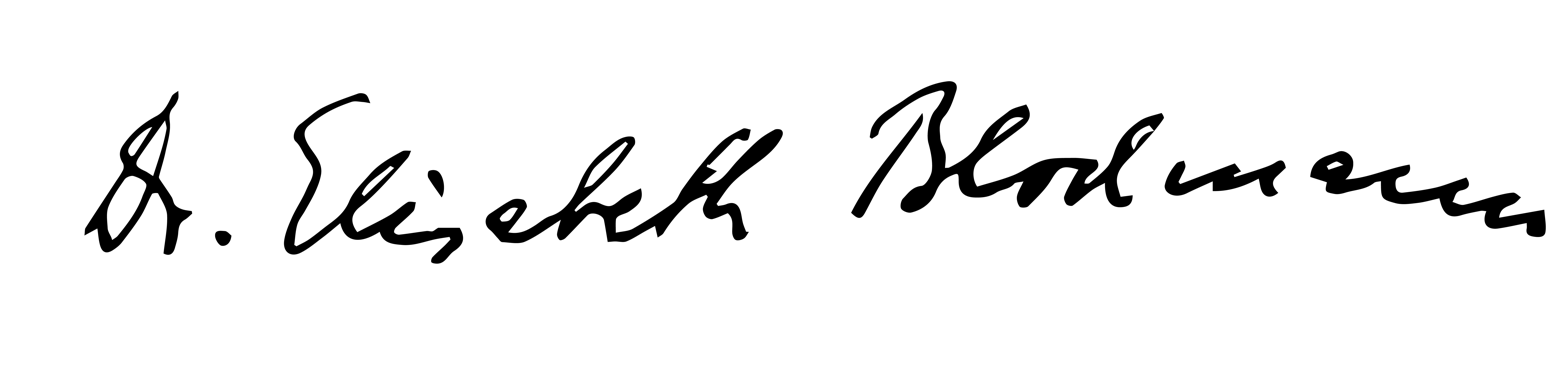

Elisabeth Blochmann (German: [ˈblɔxman]; 14 April 1892 – 27 January 1972) was a scholar of education, as well as of philosophy, and a pioneer in and researcher of women's education in Germany.

== Life ==
Born in 1892 as the first child of the public prosecutor Heinrich Blochmann and his wife Anna née Sachs into an assimilated German Jewish upper-middle-class family, Elisabeth grew up in the then Grand Ducal capital of Weimar, where she attended the upper girls' school, was certified as an assistant nurse, and qualified as a teacher. Serving as a nurse in Weimar during the first year of World War I, and then for two years as a teacher at the Großherzogliche Sophienstift, she enrolled, in 1917, at the University of Jena to study history, philosophy, and German language and literature. She then switched to the University of Straßburg, then in Germany, where she attended lectures by Georg Simmel, and after one semester, as a result of the end of the war, to the University of Marburg, where she focused on medieval history and on pedagogy and philosophy, two subjects taught together there. Her teacher, who had a chair combining both fields, was the eminent neo-Kantian Paul Natorp. In 1919, she switched to the University of Göttingen, where she met her most important academic teacher, Herman Nohl. In 1922, she passed the State Exam qualifying her to teach at the Gymnasium, and in 1923, she received a PhD in history.

Until 1926, Blochmann was an instructor at the "Social Women's School" in Thale, Harz; from 1926 to 1930, lecturer at the Pestalozzi-Fröbel House, and from 1930, Professor of Social and Theoretical Pedagogy at the Academy of Education at Halle an der Saale. After the Nazis' rise to power, she was dismissed from that position in 1933 because of her Jewish background, and fled via the Netherlands to England. Unlike almost all other German émigrés, she was able to secure an eventually permanent position at a prestigious institution, Lady Margaret Hall, the oldest women's college of the University of Oxford, where she also was University Lecturer in Education (since 1945). In 1938, she received an Oxford MA, and in 1947, she became a British citizen.

In 1952, she was invited back to the University of Marburg, in order to build up the newly founded, first independent Chair of General Education (Pedagogy), and decided to accept this call in spite of many qualms. During that year, she first became acting head of the chair, then Professor extraordinaria (full professor without a chair), and finally Professor ordinaria. During her Marburg time, she was the mentor of a large group of education scientists, many of whom went on to become very eminent scholars and administrators in their own right, forming a "Blochmann School". In 1960, she retired as professor emerita, but substituted later for vacant chairs both in Marburg and Göttingen.

In 1972, Elisabeth Blochmann died of cancer in Marburg. Her grave is in the Urnenhain of the Ockershäuser Friedhof. Recently, a prominent square in the "new center" of downtown Marburg, was named after her.

== Work ==
Blochmann's work covers history, philosophy, literature, and education. Most important is the latter, as it takes a key role in the establishment of scholarly work on the Kindergarten, as well as on women's education. In that field, her main scholarly interest was in its beginning, i.e. in the first institutions, such as girls schools, in Germany.

== Blochmann and Martin Heidegger ==
Of some importance for, and great interest in, the history of philosophy is Blochmann's affair (over many decades) with her philosophical teacher Martin Heidegger. It is probably fair to say that, after that with Hannah Arendt, she had one of the most important extramarital affairs with Heidegger (as is known since 2005, Heidegger led something of an open marriage and his wife Elfriede both knew about his affairs and conducted her own). Elfriede Heidegger and Elisabeth Blochmann were friends and former classmates.

The story is well documented in the 1989 edition of their letters, starting in 1918.

== Bibliography ==
- „Die deutsche Volksdichtungsbewegung in Sturm und Drang und Romantik”. Deutsche Vierteljahrsschrift für Literaturwissenschaft und Geistesgeschichte. Vol. 1, 1923, pp. 419 ff. Originally written as a state-examination thesis under the guidance of Herman Nohl.
- Die Flugschrift „Gedencke daß du ein Teutscher bist“. Ein Beitrag zur Kritik der Publizistik und der diplomatischen Aktenstücke. Doctoral dissertation, University of Göttingen, supervised by Karl Brandi. Published in Archiv für Urkundenforschung, edited by Karl Brandi and Harry Bresslau. Berlin and Leipzig, 1923.
- „Der Kindergarten”. In Herman Nohl and Ludwig Pallat (eds.), Handbuch der Pädagogik, vol. 4. Langensalza, 1928, pp. 75 ff.
- „Kindheit” and „Spiel”. In Sachwörterbuch der Deutschkunde. 1929.
- Co-editor, with Herman Nohl and Erich Weniger, of the series Kleine pädagogische Texte. Langensalza: Julius Beltz, 1928–1933.
- "The Superstition of the Dragon in Thuringia". Folklore. 49 (3), 1938: 288. doi:10.1080/0015587X.1938.9718769
- „Goethe Autographs in the Album of an Irishman”. The Modern Language Review. 39 (1), 1944: 58–62. doi:10.2307/3716461
- „Der Inhalt der Erziehung in der Grammar School”. Die Sammlung: Zeitschrift für Kultur und Erziehung. 2, 1946–1947: 111–121.
- „Germany Today”. German Life and Letters. 1 (2), 1948: 150–155. doi:10.1111/j.1468-0483.1948.tb00022.x
- „Schiller und die Empfindsamkeit”. Deutsche Vierteljahrsschrift für Literaturwissenschaft und Geistesgeschichte. Vol. 24, 1950, pp. 483 ff.
- „Das Motiv vom verlorenen Sohn in Schillers Räuberdrama”. Deutsche Vierteljahrsschrift für Literaturwissenschaft und Geistesgeschichte. Vol. 25, 1951, pp. 474 ff.
- „Fröbel in der Gegenwart – ein Problem: Betrachtungen zum Fröbel-Jahr 1952”. Die Sammlung. 8, 1953: 266–272.
- „Die akademische Lebensform”. Neue Sammlung. 3, 1963: 7–14.
- ed. Herman Nohl: Aufgaben und Wege der Sozialpädagogik. 1965.
- Das „Frauenzimmer“ und die „Gelehrsamkeit“: Eine Studie über die Anfänge des Mädchenschulwesens in Deutschland. Heidelberg, 1966.
- Herman Nohl in der pädagogischen Bewegung seiner Zeit, 1879–1960. Göttingen, 1969.

== Sources ==
- Klafki, W. (2020). Elisabeth Blochmann. In W. Klafki (Ed.), Pädagogisch-politische Porträts: Herausgegeben und eingeleitet von Karl-Heinz Braun, Frauke Stübig und Heinz Stübig (pp. 133–159). Springer Fachmedien Wiesbaden.
- Müller, H.-G. (2013). Berühmte und vergessene Frauen in Marburg. In Berühmte und vergessene Frauen in Marburg: 45 Biografien aus 800 Jahren Marburger Frauengeschichte (pp. 25–27).
- Elisabeth Blochmann (1892–1972), Wolfgang Klafki and Helmut-Gerhard Müller, eds., Marburg: Universitätsbibliothek Marburg, 1992. The main (short) biography, written by some of her students. The affair with Heidegger is not mentioned at all.
- Martin Heidegger — Elisabeth Blochmann. Briefwechsel 1918–1969. Joachim W. Storck, ed. Marbach am Neckar: Deutsches Literatur-Archiv, 1989, 2nd edn. 1990.
- Festgabe für Elisabeth Blochmann zum 70. Geburtstag. K.-E. Nipkow and Peter-M. Roeder, eds.
- Pädagogische Analysen und Reflexionen. Festschrift für Elisabeth Blochmann zum 75. Geburtstag. Peter-M. Roeder, ed.
- Elisabeth Blochmann zum 100. Geburtstag, Juliane Jacobi, Neue Sammlung : Vierteljahres-Zeitschrift für Erziehung und Gesellschaft. - 32 (1992), S. 317-326. - ISSN 0028-3355 (Link)
- Elisabeth Blochmann : First-Lady der akademischen Pädagogik, Juliane Jacobi, Mütterlichkeit als Profession? Lebensläufe deutscher Pädagoginnen in der ersten Hälfte dieses Jahrhunderts / Ilse Brehmer (ed.). - Pfaffenweiler : Centaurus-Verl.-Ges., 1990. - S. 256-264 ISBN 978-3-89085-331-4
- Elisabeth Blochmann zum 100. Geburtstag, Juliane Jacobi, Neue Sammlung : Vierteljahres-Zeitschrift für Erziehung und Gesellschaft. - 32 (1992), S. 317-326. - ISSN 0028-3355
- The Elisabeth Blochmann Project (2022–), a research project on the life and work of Elisabeth Blochmann (led by Claire MacLeod). https://www.elisabethblochmann.com/
- Berger, M. 2015, Elisabeth Blochmann (1892-1972)
- Blochmann, Elisabeth Friederike Emma
- Elisabeth Blochmann, <https://schulpaed.philfak3.uni-halle.de/grundschule_bereiche_mitarbeiter/128202_3259567/wenzel/1156317_2284325/pahalle/blochmann/>
- Rutschky, K. (18 May 1990). Mit Plato beim Ski. ZEIT ONLINE. https://www.zeit.de/1990/21/mit-plato-beim-ski/komplettansicht
- Festenberg, N. V. (1 April 1990). »Ein Freund, der einen verriet«. Der Spiegel, 14. https://www.spiegel.de/kultur/ein-freund-der-einen-verriet-a-43238e24-0002-0001-0000-000013497745
