= Kant and the Problem of Metaphysics =

1929 book by Martin Heidegger

- First edition cover
- Author: Martin Heidegger
- Original title: Kant und das Problem der Metaphysik
- Language: German
- Subject: Immanuel Kant
- Publisher: Friedrich Cohen
- Publication date: 1929
- Publication place: Germany
- English publication date: 1962 (Churchill); 1990 (Taft)
- Preceded by: Being and Time
- Followed by: Introduction to Metaphysics

Kant and the Problem of Metaphysics (German: Kant und das Problem der Metaphysik) is a 1929 book about Immanuel Kant by the German philosopher Martin Heidegger. It is often referred to by Heidegger as simply the Kantbuch (Kantbook). This book was published as volume 3 of the Gesamtausgabe.

The book is dedicated to the memory of Max Scheler.

== Background ==
During the 1920s Heidegger read Immanuel Kant extensively. The Kantian influence is pervasive throughout Heidegger's most celebrated and influential book, Being and Time (1927). The Kantbook can be seen as a supplement for the unfinished second part of Being and Time. Additionally, during the winter semester of 1927/28 Heidegger delivered a lecture course dealing explicitly with Kant's philosophy entitled Phenomenological Interpretation of Kant's Critique of Pure Reason (volume 25 of the Gesamtausgabe). However, the main source for the Kantbook was Heidegger's encounter with Ernst Cassirer in Davos, in 1929. It is here Heidegger begins to develop his unique interpretation of Kant which places unprecedented emphasis on the schematism of the categories. Heidegger began writing Kant and the Problem of Metaphysics immediately after Davos.

== Reception ==
Cassirer, like most Kant scholars, rejected Heidegger's interpretation of Kant. According to Michael J. Inwood, Heidegger implicitly abandoned some of the views he expounded in Kant and the Problem of Metaphysics in his subsequent work on Kant.

== English translations ==
- Martin Heidegger, Kant and the Problem of Metaphysics, trans. by James S. Churchill (Bloomington: Indiana University Press, 1962).
- Martin Heidegger, Kant and the Problem of Metaphysics, trans. by Richard Taft, (Bloomington: Indiana University Press, 1990).

Taft notes Churchill's translation "occasionally falls into awkward and misleading renderings of the original that make it hard to use today." The primary reason for this is that Churchill's translation is one of earliest translations of any of Heidegger's works into English, thus predating most of the now established conventions in Heidegger scholarship in the English speaking world.
