= Georg Wolff (journalist) =

SS-Hauptsturmführer Georg Wolff
- Born: 2 February 1914
- Died: 1996 (aged 81–82)
- Military career
- Allegiance: Nazi Germany
- Branch: Schutzstaffel
- Rank: SS-Hauptsturmführer
- Conflicts: World War II
- Other work: Editor at Der Spiegel

Georg Wolff (14 February 1914 – 1996) was a German SS Hauptsturmführer and journalist. During the Second World War, Wolff was a Head of Division III for the Sicherheitspolizei command in Oslo. He was later a leading editor for news magazine Der Spiegel, from 1952 until his retirement in 1978. It was in this latter capacity that Wolff, along with Rudolf Augstein, conducted the 1966 interview with Martin Heidegger, "Only a God Can Save Us".

== Early life ==
Georg Wolff was the son of a primary school teacher, Friedrich Wilhelm Wolff, and Dora. Wolff's mother came from an upper-class background, and her father was a financial auditor in the rail industry. The family owned their own home and Wolff grew up in relative comfort and security with his older brother, Hans.

== World War II ==
With Hitler's seizure of control in 1933, Wolff began to work with the Sturmabteilung. He undertook voluntary training with the daily newspaper Nordischer Kurier in Itzehoe, before returning to Wittenberge and studying economics for a semester at the University of Kiel. Wolff engaged in Voluntary Labour Service, and then completed two years of military service.

Wolff next studied journalism with Franz Six in Königsberg, but ended his studies prematurely after two or three semesters. Though Wolff had not finished a degree, Six used his influence as Brigadeführer in the SS to advance Wolff to the position of full time lecturer with the Sicherheitsdienst. This came about in March 1938, with Wolff operating in Königsberg. Wolf's superior SS-Sturmbannführer, Kurt Gritschke, awarded the Nazi Party Member (membership number 4.982.494) for "excellent achievement" in 1940. Wolff was, according to Gritschke, "in every respect National Socialist".

Wolff served in the SS-Einsatzkommando in 1940, under SS-Standartenführer Franz Walter Stahlecker in Norway. He then served until the end of the war as a Head of Division III of the Sicherheitspolizei command in Oslo. There he was responsible for the "reports from Norway" sent to the Reich Security Main Office. SS General Six continued to promote his former student Wolff during this period. A circular sent on 13 February 1942 recommends a detailed report by Wolff on "current events" in Norway to every officer in the Reich Security Main Office, by virtue of its "objective portrayal and comparative value". The report, that reached Reinhard Heydrich, analyses why the "destruction of the Norwegian people’s will to resist" had not been successful.

Wolff was ultimately promoted to the position of Hauptsturmführer in the SS, a role corresponding to that of captain in the modern army. By the end of the war, both Wolff and his brother Hans, who had been chairman of the district court in Köpenick, had fallen from influence. Since 1944, the Reichskommissar has taken charge of domestic affairs in occupied Norway.

== Journalism ==
Following the end of World War II, Wolff worked as a journalist and editor with Der Spiegel. He co-authored the 1950 series „Am Cafeehandel betheiligt" ("On those Involved in the Coffee Trade“) with Horst Mahnke, alongside whom he had studied with Franz Six in Königsberg. The series appeared in Der Spiegel, and attributed main responsibility for coffee smuggling to Jewish displaced persons. In March 1952, Wolff became the first head of Der Spiegel’s foreign affairs department and then became deputy editor-in-chief for Der Spiegel from 1959 to 1962. The research of former Der Spiegel editor Peter-Ferdinand Koch suggests that Wolff worked with former personal Press adjudant to Joseph Goebbels, Wilfred von Oven, during this time, focusing on matters of foreign reporting. Van Oven acted as South America correspond for Der Spiegel in the 1950s.

Wolff alone authored over eighty cover stories for Der Spiegel in the period from 1952 until 1961. This includes stories relating to Charles de Gaulle (1952) and John Foster Dulles (1953 and 1959), eight on the legacy of German statesman Konrad Adenauer (1961/1962), one on Soviet politician Yekaterina Furtseva (1957), and fifteen on the consequences of global communism. The fifteen articles were published in book form by M. DuMont Schauberg in 1961, under the title Warten auf das letzte Gefecht. Aspekte des Kommunismus. Marx, Lenin, Mao ("Waiting for the Last Battle. Aspects of Communism. Marx, Lenin, Mao").

In 1953, Wolff additionally wrote a sort of reflection piece in the Zeitschrift für Geopolitik (Journal for Geopolitics). The journal was published by Leske-Verlag, which was then managed by Wolff's former teacher Franz Six. The piece focused on the black population in colonial Africa, arguing that "the black person is intelligent, skilled and eager to learn, but he is lazy. They have no morals and no work ethic."

In 1966, Wolff worked with his brother Hans on a Spiegel story on new German Chancellor Ludwig Erhard, under whom Hans had worked in the Ministry of Economic Affairs.

In the same year, Wolff created the Spiegel Department for Arts and Humanities, that he led until his retirement on 31 December 1978. He conducted several interviews for Der Spiegel in this capacity, including with Jean-Paul Sartre, Max Horkheimer, Arnold Gehlen and Martin Heidegger. Wolff finished his unpublished memoirs in 1986, and gave them to media historian Lutz Hachmeister. Wolff died in 1996; because his past as SS Hauptsturmführer had become increasingly well known, no obituary appeared in Der Spiegel.

== Selected bibliography ==
- Warten auf das letzte Gefecht. Aspekte des Kommunismus. Marx, Lenin, Mao (DuMont Schauberg, Köln 1961)
- Co-authored with Horst Mahnke: 1954. Der Frieden hat eine Chance. (Leske, Darmstadt 1953). Both authors were editors for Der Spiegel. Franz Six was manager of the publisher at the time.
- Wir leben in der Weltrevolution; Gespräche mit Sozialisten (München, List Verlag 1971). The work contained an introduction by Dieter Brumm.
