= Gerhard Krüger (philosopher) =

German philosopher

Gerhard Krüger (German: [ˈkʁyːɡɐ]; 30 January 1902, Wilmersdorf near Berlin – 14 February 1972, Baden-Baden) was a German philosopher who was very much influenced by the philosopher Martin Heidegger and the theologian Rudolf Bultmann. He was the son of Joseph May Krüger, an accountant, and Pauline Helene Martha (née Jähniger).

Krüger attended secondary school in Friedenau and studied philosophy, evangelical theology, and history in Jena, Tübingen, and above all Marburg.
