= Karl Löwith =

German philosopher (1897–1973)

- Born: 9 January 1897; Munich, Kingdom of Bavaria, German Empire
- Died: 26 May 1973 (aged 76); Heidelberg, West Germany
- Spouse: Ada Löwith

Education
- Education: Ludwig-Maximilians-Universität München; University of Freiburg
- Doctoral advisor: Martin Heidegger

Philosophical work
- Era: 20th-century philosophy
- Region: Western philosophy
- School: Continental philosophy Phenomenology
- Institutions: Tohoku University; Hartford Theological Seminary; New School for Social Research; Heidelberg University
- Main interests: Philosophy of history Philosophical anthropology Secularization; Existentialism
- Notable ideas: Secularization thesis (modern progress as secularized eschatology)

Karl Löwith (German: [ˈløːvɪt]; 9 January 1897 – 26 May 1973) was a German philosopher best known for his critiques of historicism and his analysis of secularization in modern thought. A student of Martin Heidegger and Edmund Husserl during the Weimar Republic, Löwith developed a distinctive philosophical position that questioned the progressivist assumptions underlying much of nineteenth and twentieth-century European philosophy, and is considered one of the most influential philosophers of the twentieth century.

His most influential work, Meaning in History (1949), argued that Enlightenment philosophies of history from Giambattista Vico to Karl Marx represented secularised versions of Christian eschatology, transforming theological concepts of divine providence and salvation into immanent historical processes whilst retaining their underlying structure, which he argues is incoherent without their providential origin. This analysis established him as a major humanist critic of the notion that history possesses inherent meaning or direction (telos).

Forced into exile in 1934 due to his Jewish ancestry, Löwith spent periods in Italy, Japan, and the United States before returning to Germany in 1952, where he taught at Heidelberg University until his retirement. His experience of displacement shaped his philosophical outlook, reinforcing his scepticism towards grand historical narratives and systematic philosophies that claimed to discern the ultimate meaning of human existence.

Beyond his work on the philosophy of history, Löwith wrote extensively on nineteenth-century European thought, producing important studies of Heidegger, Nietzsche, Kierkegaard, and Max Weber. His philosophical approach combined rigorous historical scholarship with a persistent questioning of modernity's assumptions about progress, reason, and the human condition.

== Life ==
Löwith was born in Munich to a Christian family of Jewish descent. He was trained in phenomenology under Heidegger, and they developed a close friendship. However, this relationship became estranged with Heidegger's affiliation with Nazism, and Löwith had to emigrate from Nazi Germany in 1934. He was an important witness in 1936 to Heidegger's continuing allegiance to Nazism. He went to Italy and in 1936 he went to Japan (as did figures like Emil Brunner [1889-1966]) where he lectured at Tohoku University, which had its own tradition of phenomenology. But because of the alliance between the Third Reich and Japan he had to leave Japan in 1941 and went to the United States. From 1941 to 1952, he taught at the Hartford Theological Seminary and The New School for Social Research. In 1952, he returned to Germany to teach as professor of philosophy at Heidelberg, where he died.

== Thought ==
His main influences include Heidegger, Hegel, Nietzsche, and Kierkegaard. His writing after WWII can be read in the same vein as other Christian philosophers and theologians of the 20th century. Often called responses to "crisis", Christian intellectuals of this era, such as Karl Barth (Protestant), Florovsky (Orthodox), and Erich Przywara (Roman Catholic), attempted to articulate an understanding of Christian faith in response to the challenges of scientism, secularism, and skepticism.

=== Meaning in History ===
Löwith's argument in Meaning in History is that the western view of history is confused by the relationship between Christian faith and the modern view, which is neither Christian nor pagan. He writes," The modern mind has not made up its mind whether it should be Christian or pagan, it sees with one eye of faith and one of reason. Hence, its vision is necessarily dim in comparison with either Greek or biblical thinking." The modern view is progressive, which is to say that it believes that the trajectory of history is moving towards a fulfillment in the bettering of the world by rational and technological means.

Löwith believes that the modern view is a sort of Christian "heresy" insofar that this depends on the theology that history has a linear movement, in contrast to Greek pagan cyclical view of history. In this critique Löwith is prophetic in the sense that he anticipates the way post-secular theologians will pick up a similar critique of modernity in the 1990s (such is the case in the Radical Orthodox movement). The modern historical consciousness is, according to Löwith, derived from Christianity. But, this is mistaken because Christians are not a historical people, as their view of the world is based on faith. This explains the tendency in history (and philosophy) to see an eschatological view of human progress.

Löwith traces the "regression" of history as opposed to a progression through famous western philosophers and historians. Whereas most genealogies begin from the most antique to the modern, Löwith begins with the most current. He moves from Burckhardt, to Marx, to Hegel, Voltaire, Vico, Bossuet, Augustine, Orosius, and others. He argues that the closer we get to the Biblical vision of history, " I cannot discover the slightest hint of a "philosophy of history". By this he means that a truly theological view of history is not movement to an immanent end, but a transcendent eschatological hope in the consummation of the world. It is not a "philosophy" or attempt to systematize the movement of history. This point is clear in the epilogue of Meaning in History where he says, "The attempt at elucidation of the dependence of the philosophy of history on the eschatological history of fulfillment and salvation does not solve the problem of historical thinking." Here he seems to argue that like the progressive view any theological view that tries to equate the happenings of history with God's action is inadequate, which reveals his true argument: We cannot understand the happening of history by reason.

Returning to the idea that Löwith, like Barth, and others was trying to rethink Christian faith in light of the crisis of world war, Lowith's real concern is the relationship between faith and reason or more specifically faith and history. He writes, "The Christian hope is not a worldly desire and expectation that something will probably happen, but a cast of mind based on an unconditional faith in God's redemptive purpose. Genuine hope is, therefore, as free and absolute as the act of faith itself. Both hope and faith are Christian virtues of Grace. The reasons for such an unconditional hope and faith cannot rest on rational calculation of their reasonableness. Hence hope can never be refuted by so-called facts; it can neither be assured nor discredited by an established experience." His analysis of the relationship between faith and the observable events of history is one of absolute disconnect, which is an idea he seems to adopt from Kierkegaard's similar argument in Practice in Christianity. Lowith's answer to the change of modernity is to say that Christianity has nothing at all to do with history or reason, rather it is about being given faith, which becomes hope in the God-man. He writes, "The question is therefore not the justification of absolute hope and faith by their relative reasonableness, but whether such an unconditional hope and faith can be put into man instead of God and the God-man. Hope is justified only by faith which justifies itself."

So, whereas the "liberal" Christianity of his contemporaries tried to accommodate or assimilate faith with reason, Löwith maintains that faith justifies itself.

== Bibliography ==
- Löwith, Karl (1949). Meaning in History: The Theological Implications of the Philosophy of History. University of Chicago Press. ISBN 0226495558.
- Löwith, Karl (1964). From Hegel to Nietzsche. Columbia University Press. ISBN 0-231-07499-9.
- Löwith, Karl (1993). Max Weber and Karl Marx. Routledge. ISBN 0-415-09381-3.

== See also ==
- Paul Gottfried
- Numa Denis Fustel de Coulanges
