= Charles Guignon =

American philosopher

- Born: Charles Burke Guignon; February 1, 1944; Amarillo, Texas, U.S.
- Died: May 23, 2020 (aged 76); Palm Harbor, Florida, U.S.

Academic background
- Education: University of California, Berkeley
- Thesis: Heidegger and the Structure of Traditional Epistemological Arguments (1979)
- Doctoral advisor: Hubert Dreyfus
- Other advisor: Hans-Georg Gadamer

Academic work
- Discipline: Philosophy
- School or tradition: Continental philosophy
- Institutions: University of Texas at Austin; University of Vermont; University of South Florida
- Main interests: Martin Heidegger; existentialism; hermeneutics

Charles Burke Guignon (February 1, 1944 – May 23, 2020) was an American philosopher and professor emeritus of philosophy at the University of South Florida. He is known for his expertise on Martin Heidegger's philosophy and existentialism. He became a member of the Florida Philosophical Association in the early 2000s.

== Bibliography ==
- Heidegger and the Problem of Knowledge (Indianapolis: Hackett Publishing Co., 1983).
- Editor, Dostoevsky's "The Grand Inquisitor," with Related Chapters of "The Brothers Karamazov" (Indianapolis: Hackett, 1993). Includes a 40-page editor's introduction.
- Co-editor (with D. Pereboom), Existentialism: Basic Writings (Indianapolis: Hackett, 1995). Book introduction and introductions to Nietzsche and Heidegger.
- Editor, The Good Life (Indianapolis: Hackett, 1999). Book introduction and introductions to 25 readings.
- (with Frank C. Richardson and Blaine Fowers). Re-envisioning Psychology: Moral Dimensions of Theory and Practice (San Francisco: Jossey-Bass, 1999).
- Co-editor (with David C. Hiley). Richard Rorty, “Philosophy in Focus” series (Cambridge: Cambridge University Press, 2003).
- Editor, The Existentialists (Lanham, MD: Rowman & Littlefield, 2004).
- On Being Authentic (a volume in the Thinking in Action series) (London: Routledge, 2004).
- Editor, Cambridge Companion to Heidegger (Cambridge: Cambridge University Press, 1993). Includes editor's introduction and one chapter ("Authenticity, Moral Values, and Psychotherapy"). [Translated in Portuguese and Romanian]. Second enlarged edition, with new editor's Preface: 2006. [Translated into Chinese].
- Dostoevsky's "Notes from the Underground", edited with an Introduction (40 pages) with K. Aho (Indianapolis, Ind.: Hackett Publishing, 2009).

== See also ==
- Authenticity (philosophy)
- The good life
- Hubert Dreyfus
