= Włodzimierz Julian Korab-Karpowicz =

Polish philosopher and political thinker

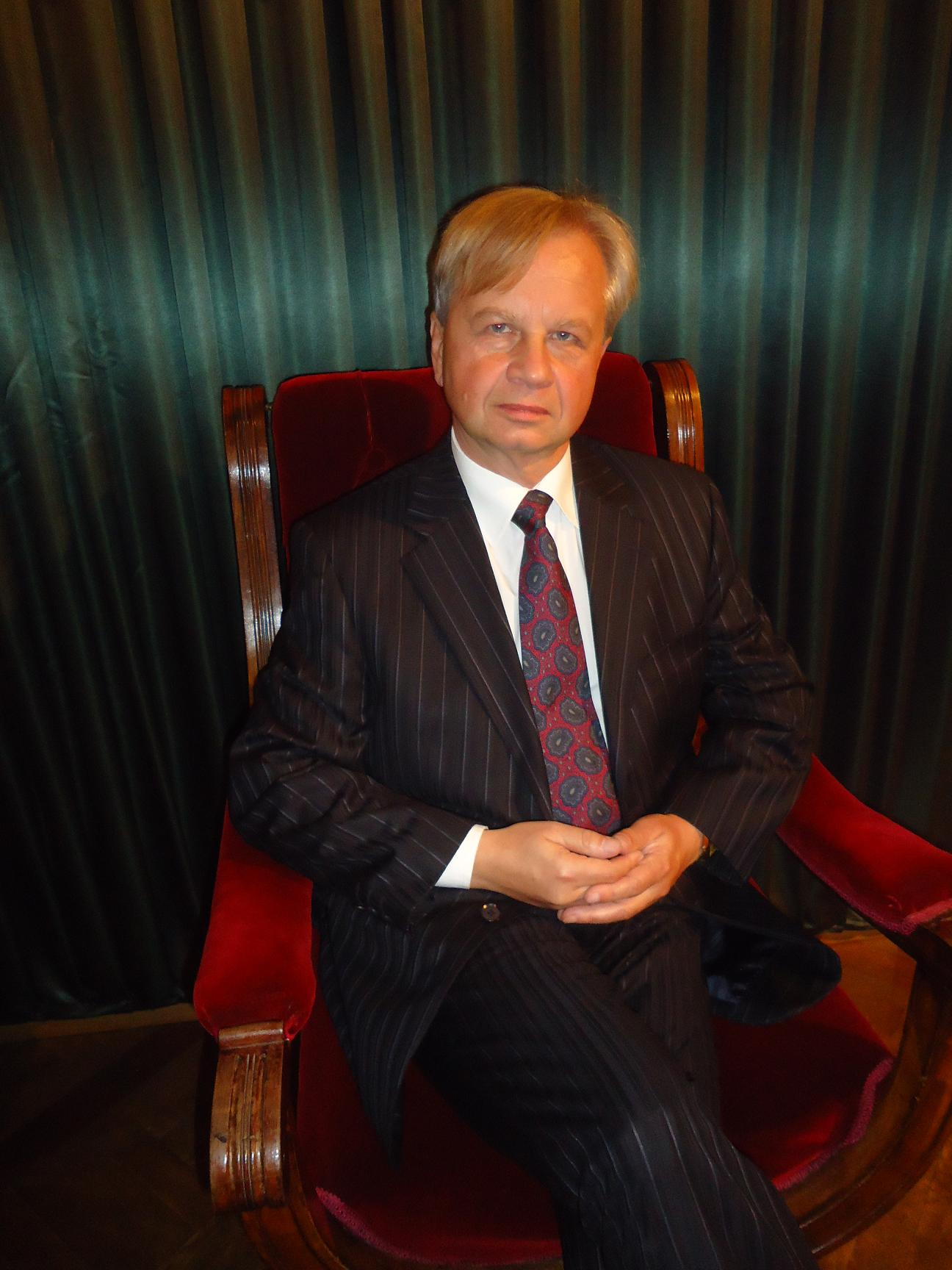
- Born: 24 October 1953 (age 73); Gliwice, Poland
- Occupation: philosophy professor

Education
- Education: University of Oxford
- Thesis: The Presocratic Thinkers in the Thought of Martin Heidegger (1999)
- Doctoral advisor: Michael Inwood

Philosophical work
- Notable works: Tractatus Politico-Philosophicus
Wlodzimierz Julian Korab-Karpowicz
- Coat of arms: Korab
- Noble family: Karpowicz h. Korab
- Father: Zbigniew Karpowicz h. Korab
- Mother: Danuta Miller h. Pomian

Włodzimierz Julian Korab-Karpowicz (born 24 October 1953) is a Polish philosopher and political theorist.

== Biography ==
W. J. Korab-Karpowicz was born in Gliwice, Poland in 1953. He comes from a noble Polish family. Korab, included in his family name, refers to the Korab coat of arms. His grandfather Jan Korab-Karpowicz was a distinguished lawyer and cavalry officer in the pre-war Poland. In his early youth he lived in Gdańsk and then in Sopot, where he completed high school. He studied engineering at the Gdańsk University of Technology, where, in 1977, he completed a master's degree in Electronic Engineering.

He then studied philosophy at the Catholic University of Lublin, where, during the Solidarity revolution of 1980–1981, he became vice-president of the Independent Students' Union (NZS). Escaping the imposition of martial law in Poland, with a scholarship from the Leadership Development Office of the Presbyterian Church (USA), he continued his studies at the University of British Columbia in Vancouver, B.C., 1983–1984, the Catholic University of America in Washington, D.C., 1984–1987, and at the University of Oxford, 1988–1991.

In 1999 he received a doctorate in philosophy from the University of Oxford, for a thesis titled "The Pre-Socratic Thinkers in the Thought of Martin Heidegger". In 2014 he received his Habilitation in Philosophy at the Adam Mickiewicz University in Poznań, Poland.

== Career ==
In 1991 he returned to Poland and was elected Deputy Mayor of Gdańsk, 1991–1992. He founded and directed the Sopot School of Polish in 1990, the Benjamin Franklin Institute of Management in 1991, the European Foundation for the Preservation of Monuments in 1993, and the College of International Affairs in 1995. He served as a diplomat with the rank of First Secretary at the Embassy of the Republic of Poland in Norway from 1998 to 2000, and acted as an ethics expert for the European Commission from 2005 to 2006. In 2014 he participated in Poland's presidential elections, but did not gain sufficient support to become an official candidate. In 2020 he was nominated the president in-spe (waiting for the office) by the monarchist initiative of Leh XI Wojciech Edward to reestablish the Kingdom of Poland.

== Academic career ==
Korab-Karpowicz has taught at several universities including Lazarski University in Warsaw, Poland, Bilkent University, Meliksah University in Turkey, Kyung Hee University in South Korea, the Anglo-American University of Prague in the Czech Republic, the Lebanese American University and the Hariri Canadian University in Lebanon, Sun Yat-sen University in China and Texas State University in the United States, and more recently at Zayed University in Dubai. He is Lady Davis Visiting professor at the Hebrew University of Jerusalem.

He is considered "one of Poland's most renowned philosophers and political thinkers" and has written several books. He is the author of On the History of Political Philosophy: Great Political Thinkers from Thucydides to Locke, (Routledge 2016) and Tractatus Politico-Philosophicus: New Directions for the Future Development of Humankind, (Routledge 2017). His articles have been published by The Review of Metaphysics, The Monist, Philosophy Today, Ethical Theory and Moral Practice, Modern Age, and many other journals. In his publications he usually uses the name: W. Julian Korab-Karpowicz. Also, being a public intellectual, he often writes for Polish and international newspapers, including Rzeczpospolita, Nasz Dziennik, Tygodnik Solidarność, Do Rzeczy, China Daily, Today's Zaman and Jerusalem Post.

== Philosophical work ==
Korab-Karpowicz presents the view that human nature, according to classical philosophy (Aristotle and Plato), contains an inclination toward cooperation and goodness, in contrast to the erroneous perspectives of modernity and postmodernism, which view humans as creatures driven by desire and the lust for power, generating constant social conflict. Therefore, he offers "an alternative to the current states of affairs through exploring the question of what conditions are conductive to harmonious society". By correcting our contemporary perspectives on humanity and life he offers the path to achieving social harmony and individual and collective happiness (which Korab-Karpowicz defines as self-realization). Happiness is not a purely individual goal, as it is linked to a social condition based on the principles of cooperation and the cultivation of virtues.

=== Seven Principles of a Happy Society and Evolutionity ===
His works, especially his principal philosophical work, "Tractatus Politico-Philosophicus," which has been published in Polish, English, Arabic, Persian, and Bengali, are characterized by an optimistic view of the possibility of moral and cognitive change in society, emphasizing that humanity is called to conscious evolution, leading to a new era of Evolutionity by which the current Postmodernity should be replaced. He returns to "the classical tradition of Western political thought" and presents seven principles of a happy society: Cooperation, Justice, Wise Leaders and Civic Virtues, Education for Virtue, Good Laws, Political Knowledge, Continuity of Generations. He argues that the state should be the organizer and defender of society, not merely an instrument of power and domination. The primary role of the government is to organize society for cooperation and ensure the common good. He calls for an enlightened political vision based on an understanding of human development and evolution, the goal of which is to transform society towards a healthy social and political life. His central message is that cooperation is the "first principle of humanity", the main principle of public life and the starting point of any social organization. When human beings understand who they really are and what their evolutionary potential for rationality and goodness is, then their culture, politics, and laws will be shaped accordingly, and we humanity can become a truly happy global society – not only emotionally, but also morally and intellectually.

=== Tractatus Politico-Philosophicus and a Critique of Postmodernity ===
Korab-Karpowicz's "Tractatus Politico-Philosophicus" (published by Routledge in 2017) is similar in style to Ludwig Wittgenstein's Tractatus Logico-Philosophicus but focuses on constructing a political-ethical system. It combines political philosophy and moral rationalism, critically assessing modern and postmodern Western philosophy, especially its materialist and nihilistic strands (such as Friedrich Nietzsche and Michel Foucault), and advocates a return to the philosophy of value (Plato, Aristotle, Thomas Aquinas). The Tractatus can be seen as a philosophical and political guide to shaping a society based on virtue and cooperation, free from modern conflicts.

== Evolutionary Realism and International Relations ==
In his major 2026 work, Political Realism: An Evolutionary Theory of International Relations (Routledge), Korab-Karpowicz introduces the Evolutionary Realism Paradigm (ERP). This theory bridges classical political realism with human evolution, moving past the traditional Hobbesian and structural realist focus on perpetual anarchy and power struggles. He argues that the global arena must transition from an era of fragmented nation-state conflicts to an integrated, cooperative international system. Under ERP, state survival and security are achieved not through unilateral domination, but through systemic moral excellence, cognitive evolution, and institutionalized global harmony. The view of complex political realism is also expressed in his often cited article in the Stanford Encyclopedia of Philosophy "Political Realism in International Relations."
