= Bombay Beach Biennale =

Annual art event in Bombay Beach, California, USA

The Bombay Beach Biennale (BBB) is an art event held in Bombay Beach, California on the Salton Sea in the lowest community in the United States. It was co-founded by Tao Ruspoli, Stefan Ashkenazy, and Lily Johnson White in 2016. The event features both temporary pieces and permanent installations such as the Hermitage Museum (designed by Greg Haberny), Bombay Beach Opera House (designed by James Ostrer), and a drive-in theater.

The BBB avows itself as a "renegade celebration of art, music, and philosophy that takes place on the literal edge of western civilization." It involves a seasonal dimension, during which numerous artists and participants gather and stay in town for several months each year while they collaborate on art and events, and it culminates in a celebratory weekend. The precise dates of the celebratory culmination are shared only with people who are actively participating in or contributing to its happening. There are no fees or tickets required to attend.

The Biennale took place every year between 2016 and 2024 (excepting 2020 due to Covid). However, as of 2024, the satire originally imbuing name of the event became reality, and the organizers of the Biennale declared that the BBB would thenceforth take place only every two years, on even numbered years. A new event, Convivium, was spawned in 2025 and will take place on odd years.

In connection with the BBB, the town and beach of Bombay Beach have become increasingly populated with a variety of permanent art installations, or as permanent as the punishing environmental conditions will allow. The BBB of 2023 saw the premiere of the Bombay Beach Lit Fest, which was inaugurated by writers Gina Frangello and Rob Roberge.

Roaming the streets of Bombay Beach during the BBB, you might encounter world-class opera, musical theatre, jazz bands, acrobats, poetry readings and writings, uncategorizable performance artists, fashion shows, dance clubs audaciously dug into the dirt, dance clubs lovingly installed into the shell of a broken building and serving coffee, fire-art installations, countless sculptures and site-specific installations, surrealist peep shows, as well as "environmental chats on the future of the Salton Sea, circus acts, film screenings, eclectic musical improvisations, and all-night dancing."

== Philosophy at the Bombay Beach Biennale ==
The celebratory weekend includes a philosophy conference with major scholars from universities such as Oxford, Harvard and more, as well as activists, artists, writers, and independent researchers presenting on topics related to the festival's themes. Past speakers have included Geoff Dyer, Eric Kaplan, Christia Mercer, Robert B. Pippin, Samantha Matherne, Kim Stringfellow, Iain Thomson, and Mark Wrathall (who is also the Director of Philosophical Operations of the BBB).

Attendees gather for philosophical dialogue in a dilapidated building open to the elements, windows and doors long ago obliterated, covered in graffiti and the traces of bygone art installations. Philosophy talks also take place at night, sometimes in the presence of a gigantic sculpture wrestling with nihilism called the Portal by sculptor Marc Vinciguerra, or in the midst of other site-specific art installations. The distinctive local forces of erosion and decay, and the possibility of art as a saving power, often frame the philosophical conversations along with the overarching themes of each year.

== Themes of the Bombay Beach Biennale ==
In 2016, the theme was "The Art of Decay".

In 2017, the theme was "The Way the Future Used to Be".

In 2018, the theme was "God’s Silence".

In 2019, the topic was “Post-Modernism”.

In 2020, activities were postponed due to COVID 19.

In 2021, the Biennale’s theme was “More Minimalism”, and the event was expanded into an entire season rather than a single weekend, with artists encouraged to live within the community full time for part of the year.

In 2022, the theme of the Biennale Season was “Questioning Hierarchy”.

In 2023, the theme was “Chaos Theory”.

In 2024, the theme was "White Gold", owing to abundant lithium reserves in the region.

In 2025, the theme was “Local Only”, and the end of season celebration, hosted by the Bombay Beach Institute was christened as Bombay Beach’s first “Convivium”, with the intention of moving the biennale to even numbered years, and the more intimate Convivia to odd numbered years.

In 2026, for the 10 year anniversary, the theme was "The Last Judgement".

== The Bombay Beach Institute (BBI) ==
The philosophy conference of the BBB takes place in collaboration with The Bombay Beach Institute (BBI), a multidisciplinary cultural and intellectual organization also located in Bombay Beach. After informally hosting events for several years, the Institute was formalized in January 2025 as a continually operating organization aimed at advancing and sustaining the Bombay Beach Biennale's ethos of artistic experimentation and community engagement beyond the BBB itself. Filmmakers Dulcinée DeGuere and Tao Ruspoli founded the institute, working alongside an evolving collective of artists, intellectuals, and other community members.

According to its webpage, "The Institute is dedicated to experiments in social terraforming, creative world building, and alternative governance." The Institute facilitates residencies, interdisciplinary conferences, and public programming that bridges local and global communities. For example, in January 2025, the Institute hosted the annual conference of the American Society of Existential Phenomenology, a group founded by the philosopher Hubert Dreyfus.

The BBI operates as a non-profit organization, with a Board of Directors and Advisors comprising artists, academics, and philanthropists. The Board of Directors includes Mark Wrathall and Eric Kaplan, and the board of advisors includes Sean Dorrance Kelly and Jay Jopling. BBI's facilities are spread across several unique sites in Bombay Beach, each tailored to a thematic focus. These include:

- The Bombay Beach Institute of Endless Poetry at the Poetry House trailer.
- The Bombay Beach Institute of Particle Physics, Metaphysics, and International Relations at 5th and H Streets.
- The Bombay Beach Museum of Bombay Beach, which features both gallery and meeting spaces.
