= Giancarlo Canavesio =

Italian film producer

Giancarlo Canavesio is a multidisciplinary entrepreneur focused on meaningful impact. He produced Neurons to Nirvana and 2012: Time for Change, through Mangusta Productions, exploring psychedelics and sustainability. He co-founded Terra Viva, a regenerative farm and founded Difuso Ibiza, revitalising historic Sa Penya homes into spaces for community and transformation. Giancarlo, bridge’s media, land stewardship and regenerative living, combining creativity, discipline, and purpose. His ventures foster innovation, conscious living, and resilience. He’s not just building businesses, but nurturing cultural and ecological renewal.

== Biography ==
Giancarlo Canavesio grew up in Jakarta, Brussels, Athens and Rome. He was an investment banker in London for 10 years, then an entrepreneur in the financial consultancy and real estate industries for another 10 years.

In 2005, Giancarlo's friend, filmmaker Fabrizio Chiesa shot the short film Beautiful Child (loosely based on a Truman Capote’s novel) in his loft in TriBeCa. After production, Giancarlo formed Mangusta Productions, an independent production company based in New York City. He next produced a three-channel film on Meditation, Sita, also by Chiesa. Shortly after the creation of Mangusta Productions, Giancarlo produced the feature films The Living Wake by Sol Tryon with Jesse Eisenberg and Jim Gaffigan, and Fix by Tao Ruspoli with Olivia Wilde and Shawn Andrews.

In 2009, he produced Being in the World by Tao Ruspoli, which explores what it means to be human in a technological age, and 2012: Time for Change by Joao Amorim with Daniel Pinchbeck, Sting, Elliot Page and David Lynch about personal and global sustainability. Simultaneously he pioneered hybrid film distribution in 2010, splitting the rights and pursuing them separately.

In 2010, Giancarlo founded Difuso, a regenerative hospitality venture based in Ibiza. As Founder and CEO, he developed the project as a model integrating hospitality with personal development and community-based initiatives, offering medium- and long-term residential stays for therapists, practitioners, creatives and digital nomads.

Difuso operates through a place-based approach that connects guests with local regenerative initiatives, including cultural activities, and has been associated with efforts to encourage more sustainable and community-oriented practices on the island.

In 2012, his next project Starlet, made on a micro-budget by Sean Baker, examined the friendship between a porn star (Dree Hemingway) and an elderly woman. He then produced Neurons to Nirvana: Understanding Psychedelics Medicines and The Lottery of Birth by Raoul Martinez and Joshua Van Praag. Neurons to Nirvana explores the medicinal properties (biological, emotional and psychological) of cannabis, psilocybin, MDMA, LSD and ayahuasca. The Lottery of Birth explores how taking freedom for granted extinguishes the possibility of obtaining it.

In 2013, Mangusta Production formed a new online digital platform, Mangu.tv, which covered Drugs & Medicines, Sex & Love, Freedom & Society and Life & Death.

He then announced the production of Monogamy and its Discontents by Tao Ruspoli, an exploration of sex, love and marriage. Dan Savage and Christopher Ryan are intertwined with Tao’s personal story. He also launched the production of Weed the People, a documentary on the anti-tumoral properties of cannabis oil for pediatric cancer. The film is directed by Abby Epstein and executive produced by Ricki Lake.
