= Neurons to Nirvana =

- Directed by: Oliver Hockenhull; Mikki Willis
- Written by: Oliver Hockenhull; Ben Phelan; Sol Tryon
- Produced by: Oliver Hockenhull; Mikki Willis; Giancarlo Canavesio; Sol Tryon
- Narrated by: Gayatri Devi
- Cinematography: David Fortney; Mikki Willis
- Edited by: Oliver Hockenhull; Mikki Willis; William Gazecki; Gabriel Valda
- Music by: Steven Gutheinz
- Production company: Mangusta Productions
- Release date: 2013
- Language: English

Neurons to Nirvana is a 2013 documentary film by Canadian filmmaker Oliver Hockenhull. The film examines the evidence for the therapeutic benefits of psychedelic drugs. The production company crowdfunded marketing and distribution through a successful Kickstarter campaign that raised more than $35,000.

Two versions of the film were released, a director's cut and an educational edition. The director's cut premiered at the Vancouver Film Festival in 2013 and is titled From Neurons to Nirvana: The Great Medicines and is 108 minutes. The popular released version is titled: Neurons to Nirvana: Understanding Psychedelic Medicines and runs 69 minutes

The film features interviews with Gabor Maté, Dennis McKenna, Rick Doblin, Charles Grob, Jeremy Narby, Stanislav Grof, David Nutt, Julie Holland, David Healy, Michael Mithoefer, David Nichols, Amanda Feilding, Stephen Ross, Ralph Metzner, Gillian Maxwell, Manuel Schoch, Michael Winkelman, William Richards, Kathleen Harrison, Roland R. Griffiths, Wade Davis, Ingrid Pacey, and Chris Bennett.

The shorter version of the film also features scenes from Ben Ridgway's experimental animated film Continuum Infinitum.

== See also ==
- List of psychedelic documentaries
