= Shawn Andrews =

Shawn Andrews may refer to:

- Shawn Andrews (American football)
- Shawn Andrews (actor)

== See also ==
- Sean Andrews (disambiguation)
