= Taylor Carman =

American philosopher

Taylor Carman (born 1965) is an American philosopher. He is a professor of philosophy at Barnard College, Columbia University.

== Education and career ==
Carman earned his Ph.D. in philosophy from Stanford University, where he worked with Dagfinn Føllesdal, but was also influenced by Hubert Dreyfus.

== Philosophical work ==
Carman's main areas of interest are in the philosophy of Martin Heidegger and in phenomenology. He is the author of Heidegger’s Analytic: Interpretation, Discourse, and Authenticity in Heidegger's Being and Time (2003) and Merleau-Ponty (2008), and the editor of The Cambridge Companion to Merleau-Ponty (2005). He is also co-editor of a philosophy series with Ashgate Publishing called "Intersection: Continental and Analytic Philosophy".

Hubert Dreyfus considered Carman to be one of the leading contemporary authorities on Heidegger and on Heidegger's concept of death in particular. Carman was featured, along with Dreyfus, Charles Taylor, Albert Borgmann, Mark Wrathall and Sean Kelly, in the documentary Being in the World (2010), which explores the phenomenology of everyday life.
