= Being in the World =

- Directed by: Tao Ruspoli
- Produced by: Giancarlo Canavesio, Christopher Redlich
- Cinematography: Christopher Gallo
- Edited by: Paul Forte, Tao Ruspoli
- Release date: 2010
- Running time: 81 minutes
- Country: United States
- Language: English

Being in the World is a 2010 documentary film directed by Tao Ruspoli. The film is based on Martin Heidegger's philosophy and is inspired by Hubert Dreyfus. It features a number of prominent philosophers.

Philosophers such as Hubert Dreyfus, Mark Wrathall, Sean Dorrance Kelly, Taylor Carman, John Haugeland, Iain Thomson, Charles Taylor and Albert Borgmann are featured in the film. Other people featured in the film include Ryan Cross, Leah Chase, Manuel Molina, Hiroshi Sakaguchi, Jumane Smith, Austin Peralta, Bob Teague, Lindsey Banner, and Elizabeth Gilbert.

== See also ==
- Being-in-the-world
- Being and Time
- Critique of technology
- Dasein
- Existence
- Phenomenology
