= LAFCO =

LAFCO may refer to:

- Los Angeles Filmmakers Cooperative, founded by Tao Ruspoli
- Local Agency Formation Commission, a regional service planning agency of the US State of California
