= British Sand Ace Championship =

British Sand Masters Championship
- Category: Motorcycle Track Racing
- Country: United Kingdom
- Region: Channel Islands and Lancashire
- Inaugural season: 2006
- Riders' champion: 2023: Paul Cooper

The ACU British Sand Masters Championship formerly the SandAce - British Championship is an Auto-Cycle Union motorcycle championship which was initially run and organised by the Guernsey Motor Cycle & Car Club. It was first run in 2006 as the Guernsey SandAce and became the Conder Ferries SandAce - British Championship in 2012.

Without Ferry support the ACU championship status was lost in 2018 for want of sponsor. In 2019, after retrieving International status, members of the Guernsey Motor Cycle & Car Club voted to forego their staging of the championship to concentrate purely on local club meetings featuring motocross bikes, cars and just a few Track Racing bikes.

In 2022, following Covid restrictions, the Cheshire Grasstrack Club took on the responsibility of staging the national championship, the ACU British Sandmasters Championship, on St.Annes Beach, Lytham, Lancashire, on the Fylde coast

Historically the Championship was one of many motor sport events taking place on Guernsey and the Channel Islands as a whole. It took place annually and was run at Vazon Beach on the west coast of the island. Guernsey Sand Racing has been going on since the 1920s. Today the Guernsey Championship is run between April and September and there are two, three four wheeled championships. On Jersey similar local events are staged by the JMC & LCC at St.Ouens Bay.

== British Championship Classes ==
There are two championship classes. They are up to 500 cc Solo machines and up to 1000 cc Right-hand Sidecars. The Sidecars were included with the introduction of the British Championship.

== International ==
There is very much an international flavor to the meeting, competitors from Australia, Denmark, France and Germany have all taken part.

== Main Sponsors ==
The current sponsor is Fylde Council, (Lancs.). Condor Ferries were previous sponsors.

== Solo Medalists ==
Year	Venue	First	Second	Third
2006	Guernsey	(England) Mitch Godden	(Guernsey) Anthony Bougourd	(England) Daniel Winterton
2007	Guernsey	(England) Mitch Godden	(England) Vince Kinchen	(Guernsey) Mike Clarke
2008	Guernsey	(Guernsey) Anthony Queripel	(England) Vince Kinchen	(England) Phil Ashcroft
2009	Guernsey	(England) Mitch Godden	(Guernsey) Anthony Queripel	(England) Phil Ashcroft
2010	Guernsey	(England) Mitch Godden	(England) Daniel Winterton	(England) Phil Ashcroft
2011	Guernsey	(England) Mitch Godden	(Guernsey) Anthony Queripel	(England) Daniel Winterton
2012	Guernsey	(England) Danny Warwick	(Guernsey) Anthony Queripel	(England) Daniel Winterton
2013	Guernsey	(England) Danny Warwick	(Australia) Rodney McDonald	(England) Andrew Appleton
2014	Guernsey	(England) Danny Warwick	(Australia) Rodney McDonald	(England) Daniel Winterton
2015	Guernsey	(England) James Shanes	(England) Zach Wajtknecht	(England) James Wright
2016	Guernsey	(England) Zach Wajtknecht	(England) Paul Cooper	(England) James Wright
2017	Guernsey	(England) Paul Cooper	(England) Daniel Winterton	(England) Josh Dingle
2018	Guernsey, Unofficial	(England) Paul Cooper	(England) Andy Whittaker	(England) Rob Fortune
2019	Guernsey	(England) Paul Cooper	(France) Jerome Lespinasse	(England) Arran Butcher
2020 - '21	NO COMP'N	COVID-19		
2022	(England) Fylde	(England) Paul Cooper	(England) Charley Powell	(Jersey) Jordon Noel
2023	(England) Fylde	(England) Paul Cooper	(England) Daniel Winterton	(England) Mark Wrathall

== Sidecars Medalists ==
Year	Venue	First	Second	Third
2012	Guernsey	(England) Rob Wilson & Terry Saunters	(England) Mark Cossar & Carl Blyth	(England) Matt Tyrrell & Mark Courtney
2013	Guernsey	(England) Rod Winterburn & Liam Brown	(England) Rob Wilson & Terry Saunters	(England) Gareth Winterburn & Billy Winterburn
2014	Guernsey	(England) Robbie Wilson & Bradley Steer	(England) Rob Wilson & Terry Saunters	(England) Peter Lloyd & Daz Whetstone
2015	Guernsey	(England) Gareth Winterburn & Billy Winterburn	(England) Rod Winterburn & Liam Brown	(England) Gary Shearer & Sam Bond
2016	Guernsey	(England) Rod Winterburn & Billy Winterburn	(England) Gareth Winterburn & Liam Brown	(England) Rob Wilson & Danny Hogg
2017	Guernsey	(England) Rod Winterburn & Billy Winterburn	(England) Rob Wilson & Terry Saunters	(England) Will Offen & Sam Black
2018	Guernsey Unofficial	(England) Rob Wilson & Terry Saunters	(to follow)	(to follow)
2019	Guernsey	(England) Rob Wilson & Terry Saunters	(Wales) Neal Owen & Jason Farwell (England)	(England) Will Penfold & Ricky Pay
2020 - 21	NO COMP'N	COVID-19		
2022	(England) Fylde	(England) Billy Winterburn & Ryan Wharton	(Wales) Neal Owen & Jason Farwell (England)	(England) Rick McAuley & Stephen Russell
2023	(England) Fylde	(England) Colin Blackbourn & Carl Pugh	(Wales) Neal Owen & Jason Farwell (England)	(England) Clint Blondel & Richard Webb

=== Results by rider ===
Solos

Rider	First	Second	Third	Podium
(England) Paul Cooper	5	1	0	6
(England) Mitch Godden	5	0	0	5
(England) Danny Warwick	3	0	0	3
(Guernsey) Anthony Queripel	1	3	0	4
(England) Zach Wajtknecht	1	1	0	2
(England) James Shanes	1	0	0	1
(England) Daniel Winterton	0	3	4	7
(England) Vince Kinchin	0	2	0	2
(Australia) Rodney McDonald	0	2	0	2
(Guernsey) Anthony Bougourd	0	1	0	1
(England) Phil Ashcroft	0	0	3	3
(England) Mark Wrathall	0	0	1	1
(Jersey) Jordan Noel	0	0	1	1
(England) Rob Fortune	0	0	1	1
(England) Andy Whittaker	0	1	0	1
(England) Charley Powell	0	1	0	1
(England) James Wright	0	0	2	2
(Guernsey) Mike Clarke	0	0	1	1
(England) Andrew Appleton	0	0	1	1
(England) Josh Dingle	0	0	1	1
(France) Jerome Lespinasse	0	1	0	1
(England) Arran Butcher	0	0	1	1

Sidecars

Driver	First	Second	Third	Podium
(England) Rod Winterburn	3	1	0	4
(England) Rob Wilson	2	3	1	6
(England) Gareth Winterburn	1	1	1	3
(England) Robbie Wilson	1	0	0	1
(England) Mark Cossar	0	1	0	1
(England) Matt Tyrrell	0	0	1	1
(England) Peter Lloyd	0	0	1	1
(England) Gary Shearer	0	0	1	1
(England) Will Offen	0	0	1	1
(Wales) Neal Owen	0	1	0	1
(England) Will Penfold	0	0	1	1

Sidecars

Passenger	First	Second	Third	Podium
(England) Billy Winterburn	3	0	1	4
(England) Terry Saunters	2	3	0	5
(England) Liam Brown	1	2	0	3
(England) Bradley Steer	1	0	0	1
(England) Carl Blyth	0	1	0	1
(England) Mark Courtney	0	0	1	1
(England) Daz Whetstone	0	0	1	1
(England) Sam Bond	0	0	1	1
(England) Danny Hogg	0	0	1	1
(England) Sam Black	0	0	1	1
(England) Jason Farwell	0	1	0	1
(England) Ricky Pay	0	0	1	1
