= Ostrer =

Ostrer is a surname. Notable people with the surname include:

- Harry Ostrer, American geneticist
- James Ostrer (born 1979), British photographer
- Maurice Ostrer (1896–1975), British film executive
- Pamela Ostrer (1916–1996), English actress, author, and screenwriter
