= Hiroshi Sakaguchi =

Japanese carpenter

Hiroshi Sakaguchi is a Japanese carpenter and the founder of Ki Arts (1985), a traditional Japanese company in Northern California. He is featured in Tao Ruspoli's film Being in the World.
