= Bombay Beach, California =

Bombay Beach
- Census-designated place
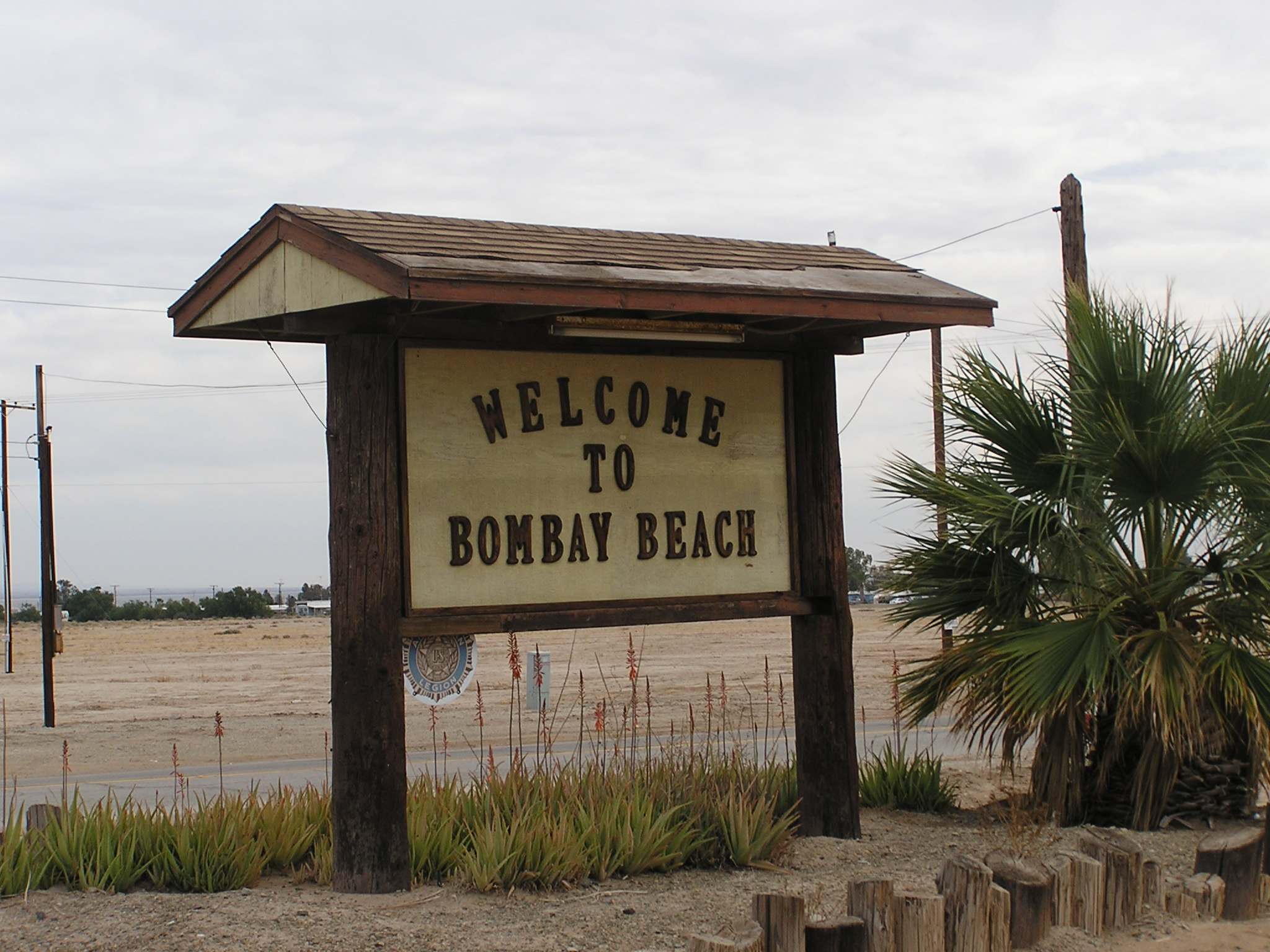
- Sign for Bombay Beach

- Location in Imperial County and the state of California

- Location in the United States
- Coordinates: 33°21′03″N 115°43′47″W
- Country: United States
- State: California
- County: Imperial

Area
  - Total: 0.66 sq mi (1.72 km^{2})
  - Land: 0.66 sq mi (1.72 km^{2})
  - Water: 0 sq mi (0.00 km^{2}) 0%
- Elevation: −223 ft (−68 m)

Population (2020)
  - Total: 231
  - Density: 348.0/sq mi (134.37/km^{2})
- Time zone: UTC−8 (Pacific)
  - Summer (DST): UTC−7 (PDT)
- ZIP code: 92257
- Area codes: 442/760
- FIPS code: 06-07372
- GNIS feature IDs: 1667823, 2407878

Bombay Beach is a census-designated place (CDP) in Imperial County, California, United States. It is located on the Salton Sea, 4 miles (6.4 km) west-southwest of Frink and is the lowest community in the United States, located 223 feet (68 m) below sea level. The population was 231 at the 2020 census, down from 295 in 2010, down from 366 in 2000. It is part of the El Centro, California, metropolitan statistical area.

Bombay Beach was once a popular getaway for beachgoers until the 1980s, when the draining and increasing salinity of the Salton Sea destroyed the lake's ecosystem and drove businesses and private landowners out of the area, rendering Bombay Beach a ghost town. Despite this, by 2018, a number of people had moved into the area, and the town's many abandoned structures and features from its past have drawn visitors back in. A 2018 article in The Guardian stated that it was "enjoying a rebirth of sorts with an influx of artists, intellectuals and hipsters who have turned it into a bohemian playground." The Bombay Beach Biennale, an annual art festival, is held here.

== History ==
During the 1950s, Bombay Beach was a popular beach-going destination. Celebrities such as Frank Sinatra, the Beach Boys, and Bing Crosby frequented the luxury resorts along the Salton Sea, which was known for its fishing, boating and water skiing. The area attracted half a million tourists annually, rivaling Yosemite National Park.

Bombay Beach's decline began in the 1970s, when the runoff (full of salty chemicals) led to a warning that the salinity of the lake would no longer sustain wildlife; that occurred by the early 1980s. Many residents around the Salton Sea, including those in Bombay Beach, were eventually driven out by the odor of the dying fish, the fear of health problems, and the flooding and the draining of the Salton Sea. Many of the remaining residents are reportedly either too poor to move out or too attached to the history of the area to leave. A report by the Pacific Institute in September 2019 stated that ten years earlier, "there were some 100 million fish in the Sea. Now, more than 97 percent of those fish are gone."

Most of the few residents use golf carts to get around, since the nearest gas station is 20 miles (32 km) away in Niland. There are two stores in the town, one of which is a convenience store, and the closest hospital is over 45 minutes away in Brawley. The Ski Inn bar and restaurant is the only eating and drinking establishment in the town. The "Bombay Beach Drive-In" is an art installation consisting of old, abandoned cars at a drive-in theater. A visitor in 2019 wrote that there were many "discarded homes and trailers long-since abandoned" and that many of the buildings were "windowless husks blanketed in graffiti, surrounded by broken furniture and rubble." The town has several different resource centers available to community members; there's a tool library, and a system of book and media libraries.

The derelict "living ghost town" status of Bombay Beach has attracted many photographers, filmmakers, urban explorers, and tourists. The town, as well as others on the shores of the Salton Sea, is one of the lowest settlements in elevation in North America. The local American Legion, Post 801, had 36 members in 2016 and closed down "for a few years" before reopening as a volunteer-run facility.

In 2018, as people began to move back into Bombay Beach, house prices had risen; some bungalows were selling for "tens of thousands of dollars." The community has held the Bombay Beach Biennale each spring since 2016, inviting "artists, academics, writers, and film-makers to create work, give lectures, and stage happenings". The 2020 Biennale was postponed due to the COVID-19 pandemic.

The population of Bombay Beach has been described as "mostly elderly residents" who "live in a grid of mobile homes and eccentric (and, sometimes, elaborate) small homes and shacks."

== Geography ==
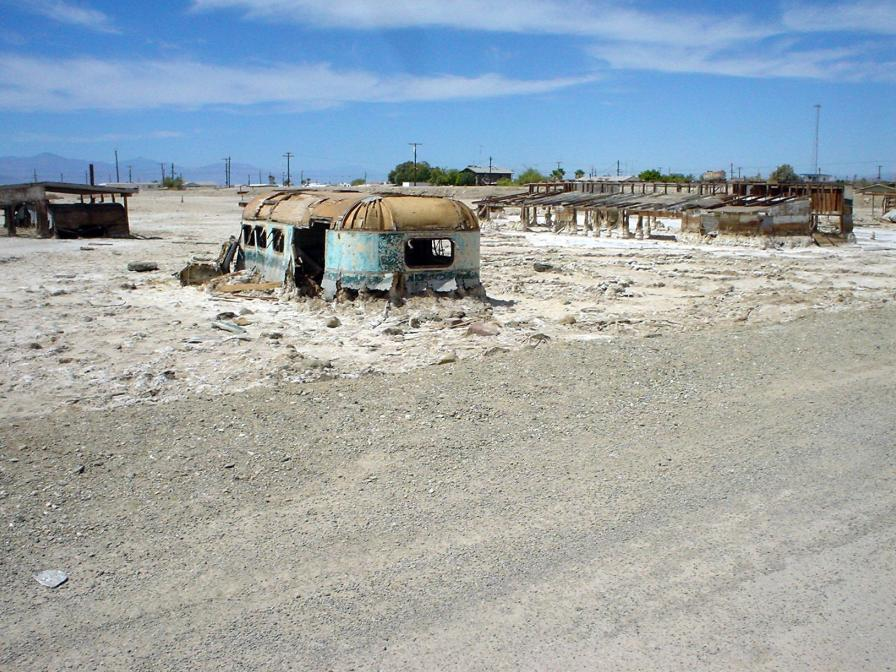
Abandoned, salt-encrusted structures on the Salton Sea shore at Bombay Beach in 2004.

Bombay Beach is located in Southern California's Sonoran Desert. Bombay Beach is located on the east shore of the Salton Sea and, like many communities along its shores, has had to contend with fluctuating water levels, reducing size of the lake and increasing salinity. A berm was built in the 1970s to protect the west end of the town, but a portion of the town beyond the berm was either submerged or half-buried in mud.

Bombay Beach marks the southern end of the San Andreas Fault, where the southern terminus of the San Andreas transitions into the Brawley Seismic Zone.

== Art ==
Bombay Beach features a large number of art pieces and installations around the town and along the beach.

Every spring there is a three day festival that is held in Bombay Beach California, which is called Bombay Beach Biennale. Lily Jhnson, Stefan Ashkenazy, Tao Ruspoli were the people who founded this festival in 2016. In the festival there's music, art, theater and other creative performances throughout the town. The artists are able to create unusual art as a safe place to express themselves. The event is also a major thing to bring attention to the environmental problems affecting Salton Sea.

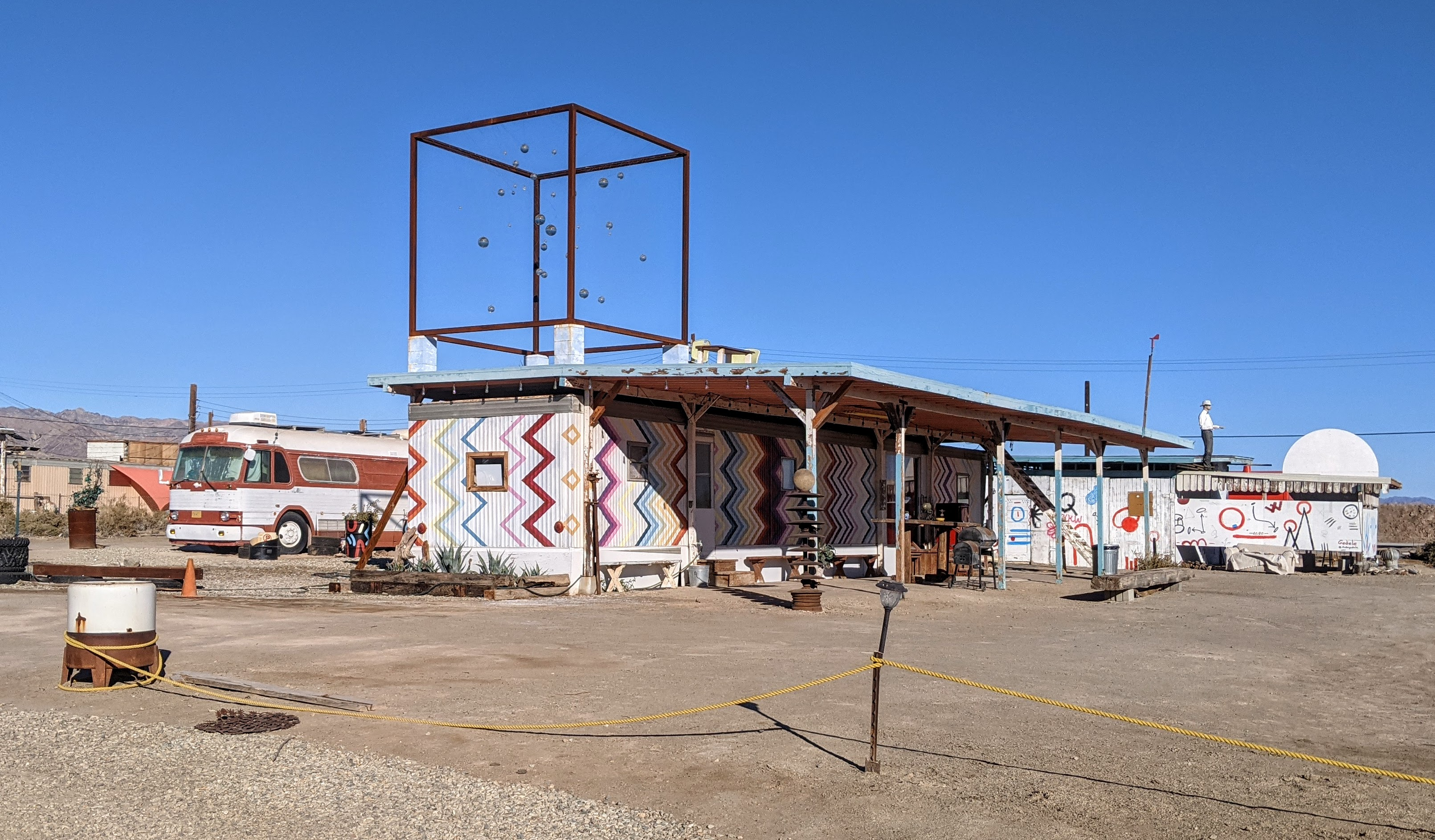
The ZigZag House

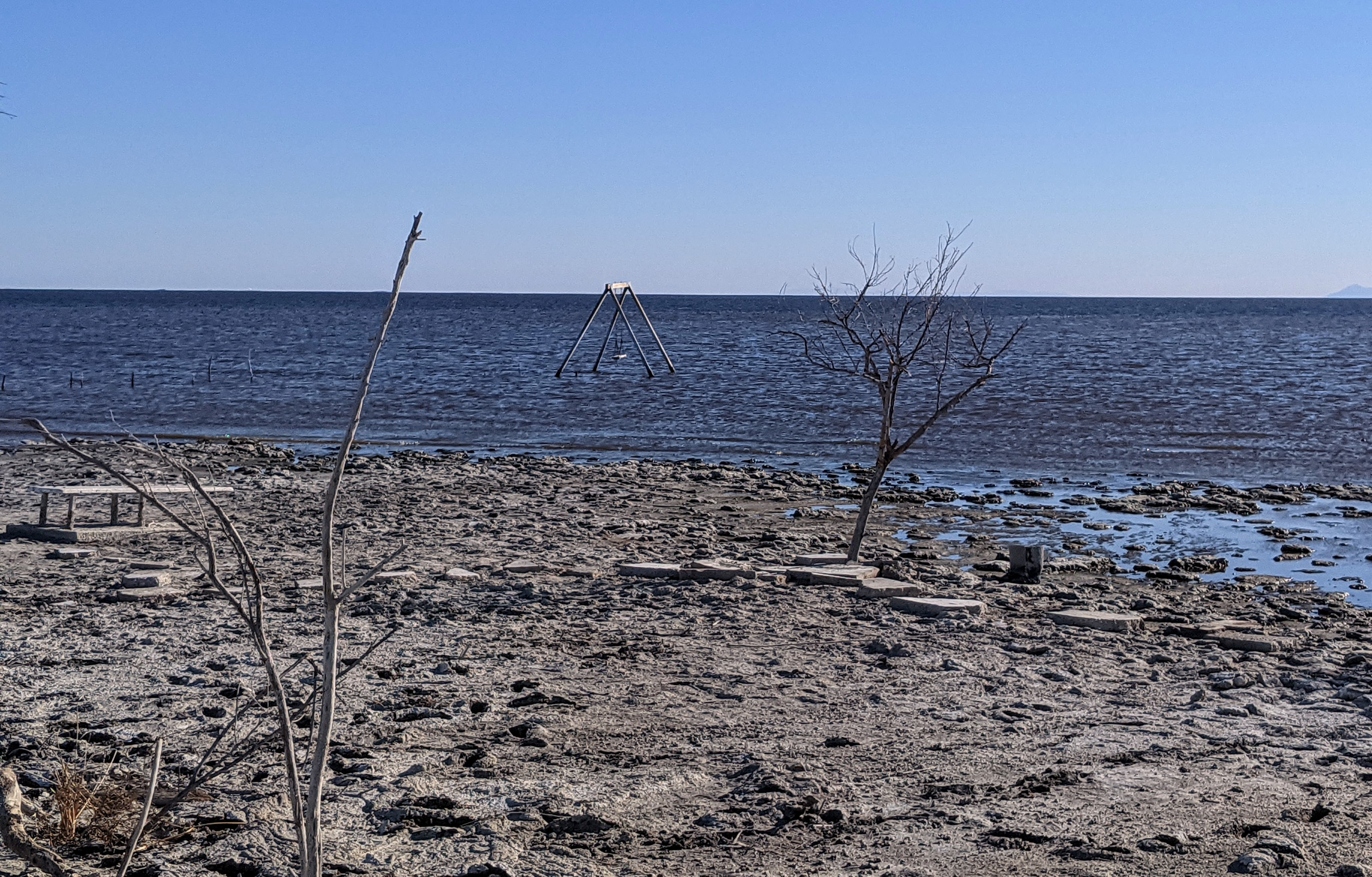
“The Water’s Fine, It’s Just Salty” by Ssippi.

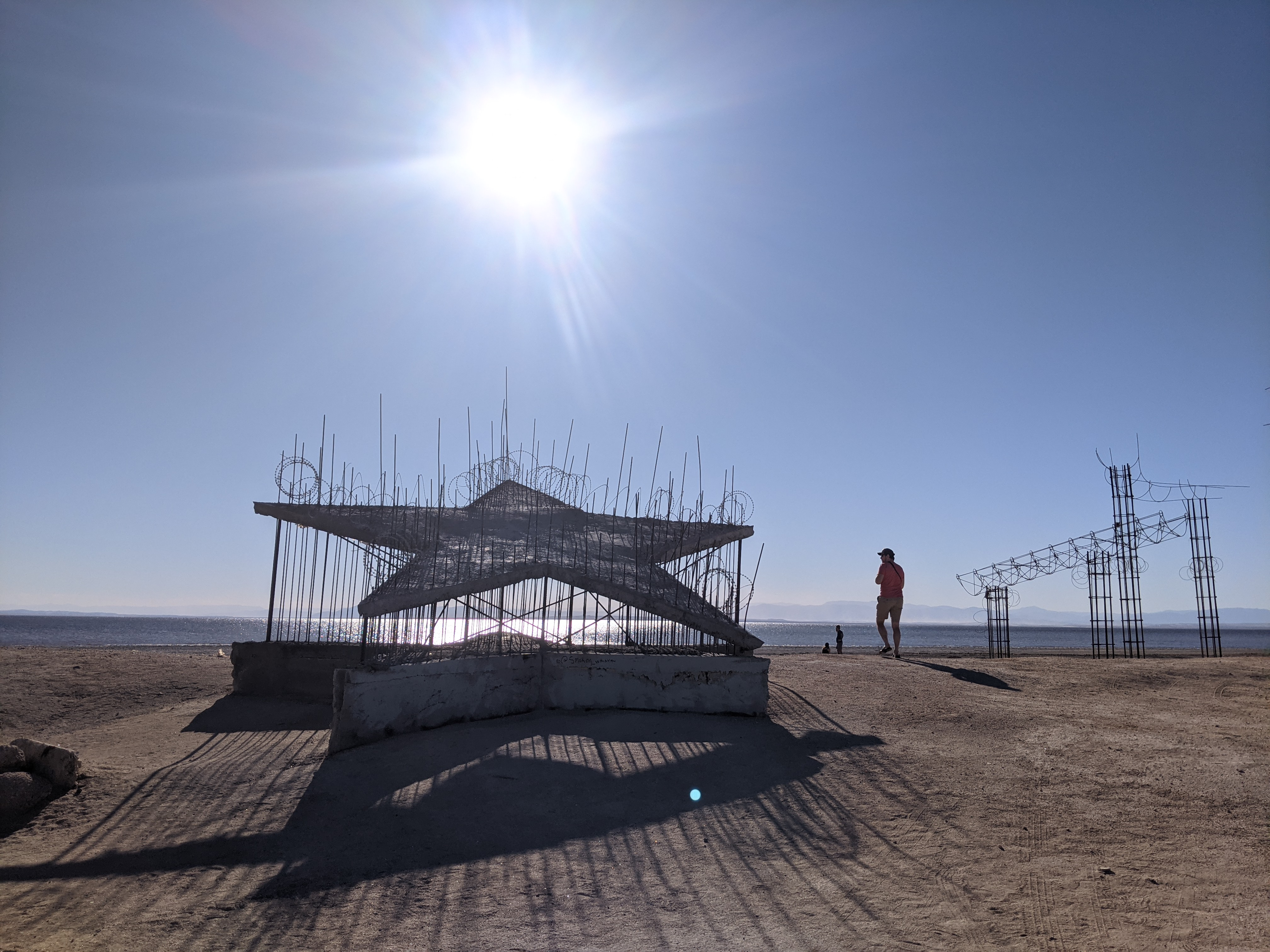
Art pieces

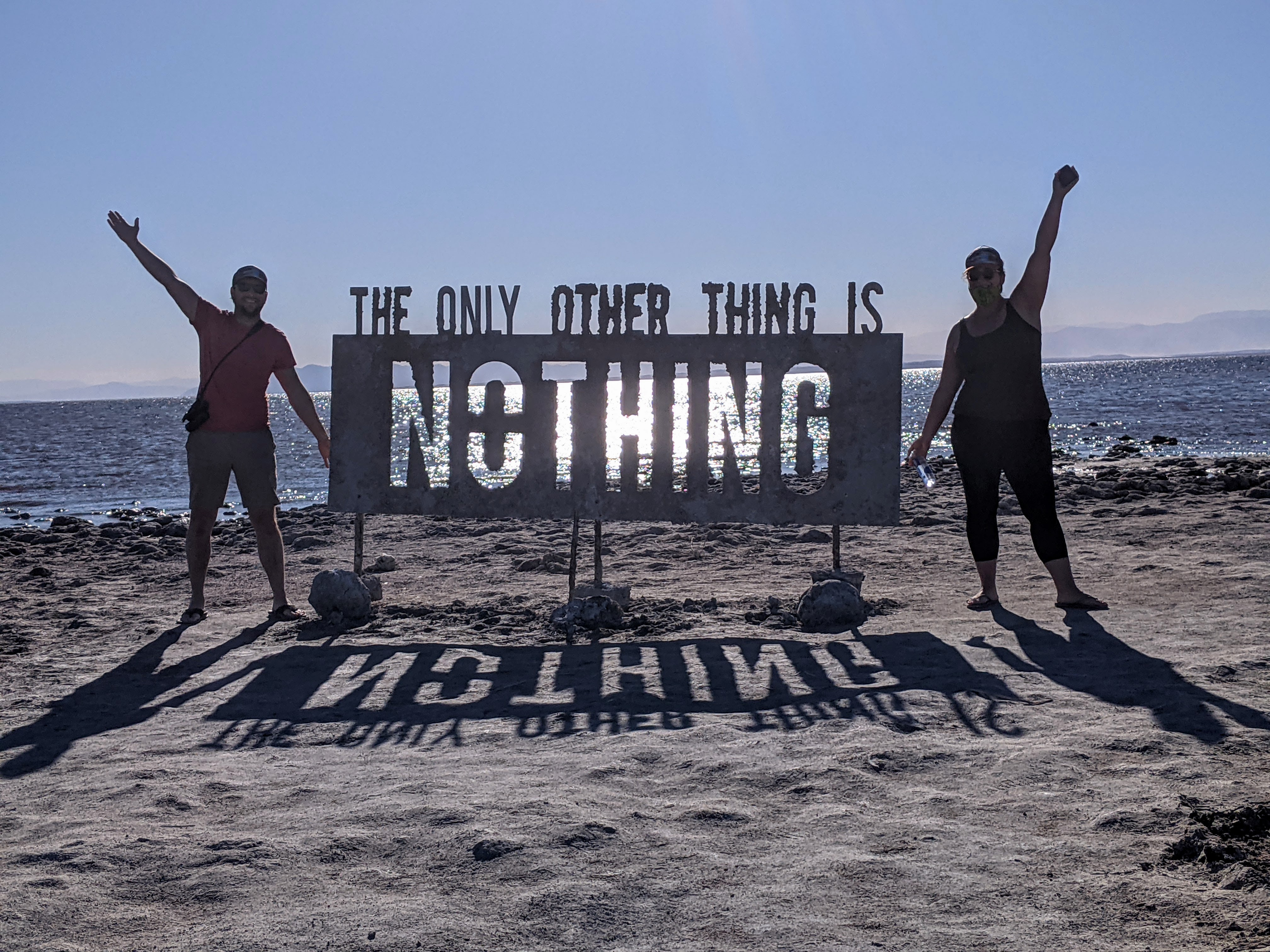
The Only Other Thing by Michael Birnberg

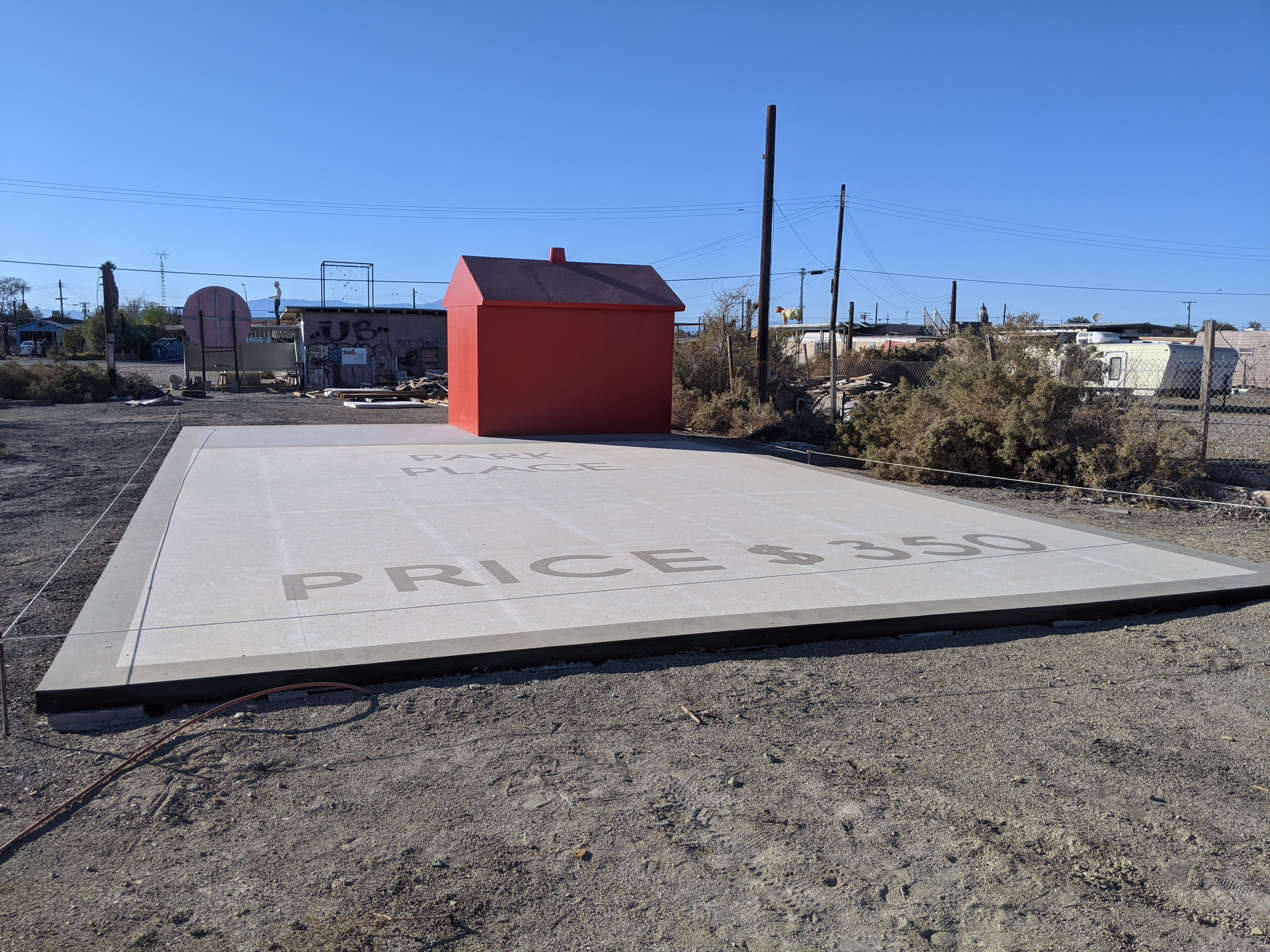
“Park Place” by David Corcoran and Tao Ruspoli

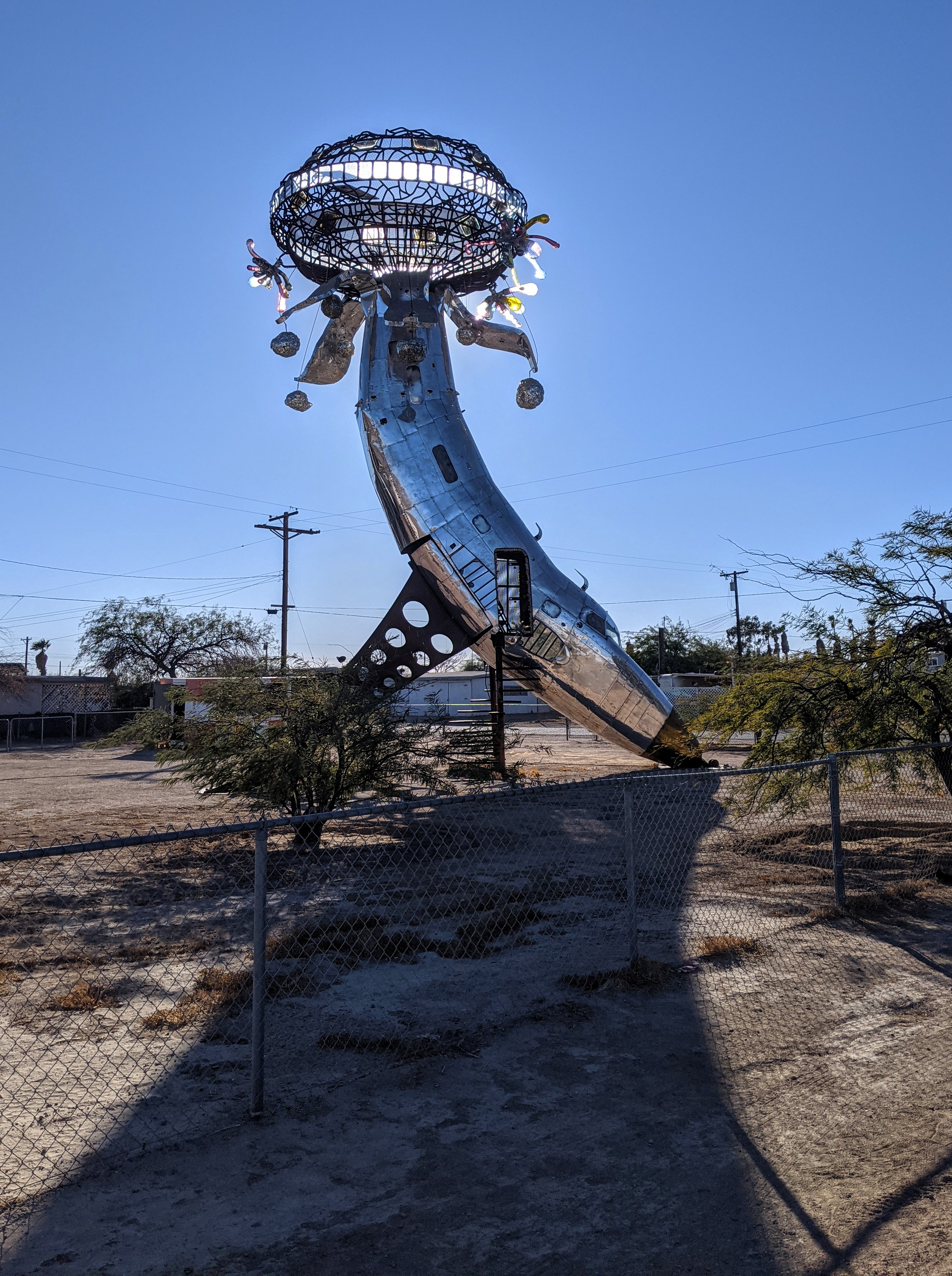
“Lodestar” by Randy Polumbo.

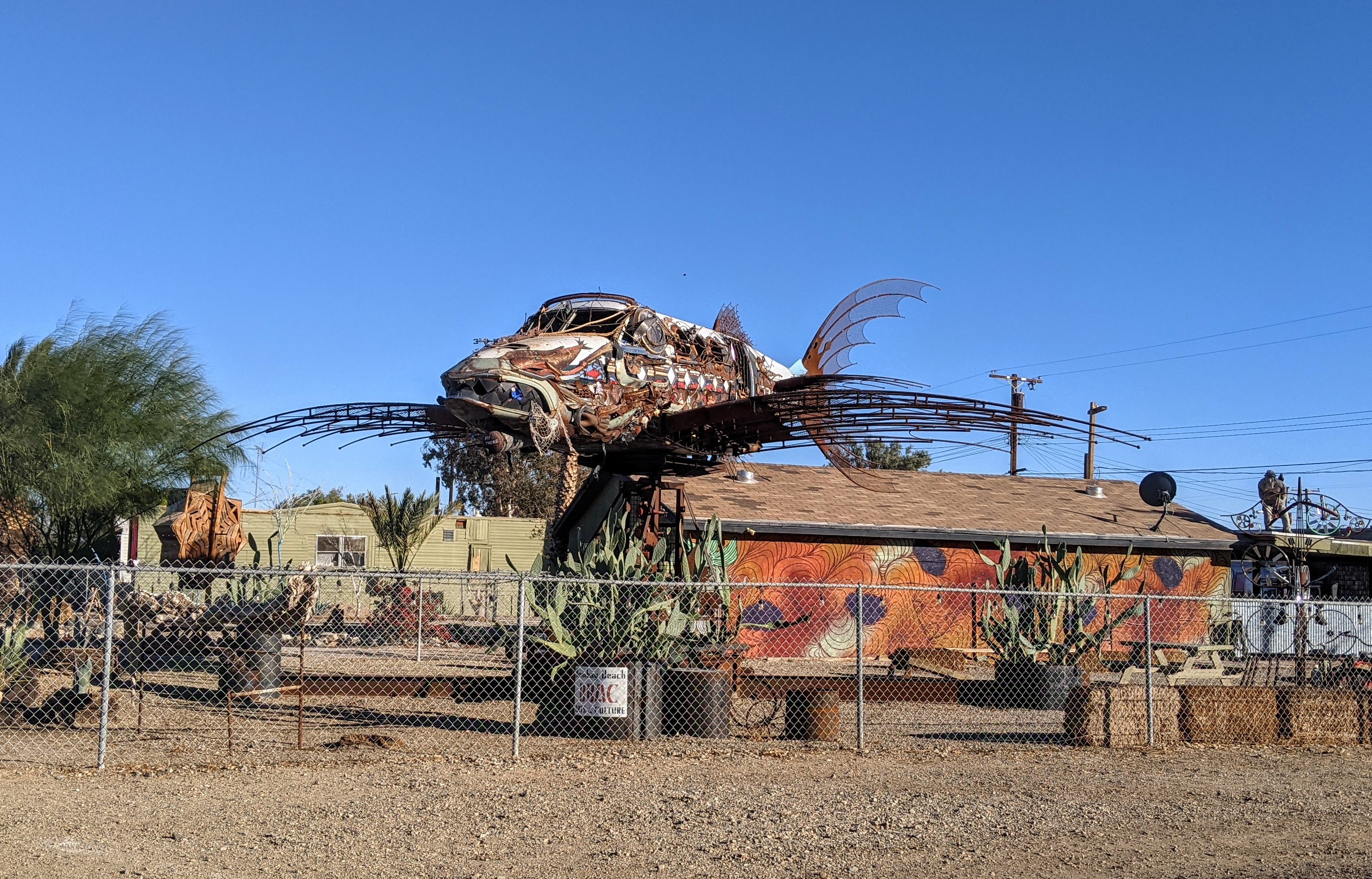
Flying fish

== Demographics ==
Historical population
Census	Pop.	Note	%±
2000	366		—
2010	295		−19.4%
2020	231		−21.7%
U.S. Decennial Census; 1850–1870 1880-1890; 1900 1910 1920; 1930 1940 1950; 1960 1970 1980; 1990 2000 2010

Bombay Beach first appeared as a census designated place in the 2000 U.S. census.

=== 2020 census ===
As of the 2020 census, Bombay Beach had a population of 231. The population density was 347.9 inhabitants per square mile (134.3/km^{2}). The age distribution was 22 people (9.5%) under the age of 18, 14 people (6.1%) aged 18 to 24, 32 people (13.9%) aged 25 to 44, 69 people (29.9%) aged 45 to 64, and 94 people (40.7%) who were 65 years of age or older. The median age was 60.2 years. For every 100 females, there were 106.2 males, and for every 100 females age 18 and over there were 104.9 males age 18 and over.

0.0% of residents lived in urban areas, while 100.0% lived in rural areas.

There were 132 households, out of which 23 (17.4%) had children under the age of 18 living in them, 32 (24.2%) were married-couple households, 6 (4.5%) were cohabiting couple households, 48 (36.4%) had a female householder with no partner present, and 46 (34.8%) had a male householder with no partner present. 68 households (51.5%) were one person, and 38 (28.8%) were one person aged 65 or older. The average household size was 1.75. There were 56 families (42.4% of all households).

There were 369 housing units at an average density of 555.7 units per square mile (214.6 units/km^{2}), of which 132 (35.8%) were occupied. Of these, 89 (67.4%) were owner-occupied, and 43 (32.6%) were occupied by renters. The homeowner vacancy rate was 1.7% and the rental vacancy rate was 8.5%.

Racial composition as of the 2020 census
Race	Number	Percent
White	146	63.2%
Black or African American	21	9.1%
American Indian and Alaska Native	7	3.0%
Asian	0	0.0%
Native Hawaiian and Other Pacific Islander	1	0.4%
Some other race	34	14.7%
Two or more races	22	9.5%
Hispanic or Latino (of any race)	56	24.2%

== Government ==
In the California State Legislature, Bombay Beach is in the 18th senatorial district, represented by Democrat Steve Padilla, and the 36th Assembly district, represented by Republican Jeff Gonzalez. In the United States House of Representatives, Bombay Beach is in California's 25th congressional district, represented by Democrat Raul Ruiz.

Fire protection and emergency medical services in Bombay Beach are provided by the Imperial County Fire Department and the Bombay Beach Volunteer Fire Department, the latter of which consists of one member.

Law enforcement in Bombay Beach is provided by the Imperial County Sheriff's Office North County Patrol Division.

Water service is provided by the Coachella Valley Water District.

Parks and recreation, street lights, and trash/sanitation provided by Bombay Beach Community Services District.

== In media ==
=== Music ===
Florian-Ayala Fauna of the music duo uncertain grew up in Bombay Beach. Fauna credits the place as an inspiration to her music. According to Paris-based art community Artchipel, Fauna said the place had a "big impact on her childhood and became a major influence in her life." In an interview with Buffalo, New York alternative newspaper The Public's Cory Perla, she described it as "a very kind of post-apocalyptic-looking town."

Bombay Beach is the subject of the 2019 single "Bombay Beach" by the Minneapolis blues rock band The Dead Century.

Electronic artist Jane Remover's 2021 song "Champ" contains a verse that references Bombay Beach.

The visualizer for Deftones' song "i think about you all the time" was mostly filmed in Bombay Beach.

=== Sports ===
American football safety Cedric Thompson for the Minnesota Vikings of the National Football League (NFL) also grew up in Bombay Beach, California. He became one of the primary subjects of the 2011 documentary Bombay Beach directed by Alma Har'el. He later cited boredom in Bombay Beach as his inspiration for pro football.

=== Filming ===
Bombay Beach is a documentary film about some residents of the community, made by Israeli-born filmmaker Alma Har'el, and described by The New York Times as a "surreal documentary". The film won first prize in the documentary section of the Tribeca Film Festival in 2011.

A 2013 promotional video for the fifth season of Animal Planet's River Monsters was filmed at Bombay Beach.

Austrian singer Christina Stürmer used Bombay Beach as one of the settings for her video of the song "Millionen Lichter" ("A Million Lights)".

In the CBS police procedural series The Mentalist, the first episode of the sixth season "The Desert Rose" was filmed in Bombay Beach, California. The production team created a sign for the fictional "Borrego Gas Diner" to stand-in for the local bar and restaurant Ski Inn.

In 2015, the film Sky opens with an unhappily married French couple on vacation in the deserts of Southern California. While visiting Bombay Beach, they mention its potential for a very large earthquake.

Bombay Beach is featured in the 4th season of NCIS: Los Angeles ("Red Part 2")

In the Netflix Series S.W.A.T. (2017 TV series), Bombay Beach is featured in S3:E9 as the site of a showdown between law enforcement and a criminal trafficking gang.

=== Video games ===
The town of Sandy Shores in the 2013 video game Grand Theft Auto V is partially based on Bombay Beach.

== See also ==
- Outline of the Salton Sea
- Southern Border Region
