= Herbert Kleber =

American psychiatrist and substance abuse researcher

- Born: June 19, 1934; Pittsburgh, Pennsylvania, U.S.
- Died: October 5, 2018 (aged 84); Santorini, Greece
- Education: Dartmouth College (BA); Jefferson Medical College (MD)
- Occupation: Psychiatrist
- Known for: Contributions to psychiatry and substance abuse research
- Spouses: 1st Joan Fox; 2nd Marian Fischman; 3rd Anne Burlock Lawver

Herbert David Kleber (June 19, 1934 – October 5, 2018) was an American psychiatrist and substance abuse researcher. His career, centered on the evidence-based treatment of addiction, focused on scientific approaches in place of punishment and moralisms. His career focused on pathology of addiction to help patients reduce the severe discomforts of withdrawal, avoid relapse and stay in recovery.

== Early life and education ==
Kleber was born June 19, 1934, in Pittsburgh. Both of his parents were eastern-European Jewish immigrants. His father, Max Kleber, was a trained pharmacist who made his career in his family-owned luggage manufacturing business. His mother, Dorothea (Schulman) Kleber, was active in fund raising for Israel.

Kleber attended Dartmouth College and received medical training at Jefferson Medical College in Philadelphia. He then served his residency at Yale-New Haven Hospital. He entered the U.S. Public Health Service in 1964, and was disappointed when he was assigned for two years to the health service hospital in Lexington, Kentucky. Much of the patient population at Lexington were substance users (programs at Lexington later became the basis for the National Institute on Drug Abuse). Although Kleber wanted a regular psychiatry practice, because of his experience at Lexington, he found himself in demand for treatment of addiction when he returned to Yale.

== Career ==
In 1968, he founded the Drug Dependence Unit at Yale University, where he was a professor of psychiatry; he headed the Unit until 1989. He then served for two and a half years as the Deputy Director for Demand Reduction at the Office of National Drug Control Policy in the White House.

Kleber's work promoted scientific research into the causes and treatments of addiction. He rejected an earlier common moralistic approach to treatment. Kleber viewed substance use disorders as diseases rather than moral failings and stressed the importance of research in treatment. He was a leader in reframing addiction treatment as a medical discipline and advocated for the use of medications as well as therapeutic communities in maintaining recovery and reducing rates of relapse. He focused on developing program which was individualized, and not "one size fits all" approach as some addicts may be afflicted by psychological problems, or have no vocational skills.

In 1992, Kleber, with his wife Marian Fischman, co-founded the Substance Abuse Division, one of the leading centers in the country for treatment of such abuse, within the Department of Psychiatry at Columbia University. He was director of the Division, and headed a number of projects on new methods to treat individuals with cocaine, heroin, prescription opioid, alcohol, or marijuana addictions. He also co-founded the National Center on Addiction and Substance Abuse at Columbia with Joseph Califano.

A 2014 article in Vice said that Kleber served as a paid consultant to the opioid pharmaceutical industry.

Kleber was author or co-author of more than 250 papers, and the co-editor of the American Psychiatric Press Textbook of Substance Abuse Treatment, now in its fourth edition. He received numerous prestigious awards and two honorary degrees.

He was elected in 1996 as a member of the Institute of Medicine of the National Academy of Sciences. He was on the boards of a number of organizations, including the Partnership for a Drug-Free America, the Treatment Research Institute at the University of Pennsylvania, and the Betty Ford Center.

== Personal life ==
Kleber married Joan Fox, his high school sweetheart, in 1956. They raised three children together and later divorced. Kleber then married drug addiction researcher Marian Fischman, who died in 2001. He was married to photographer Anne Burlock Lawver from 2004 until his death from heart failure on October 5, 2018, while vacationing with his family in Greece.

== In popular culture ==
On October 1, 2019, Google honored Kleber by celebrating the 23rd anniversary of his election to the National Academy of Medicine with a Google Doodle.

== See also ==
- Psychedelia – Film about the history of psychedelic drugs
