= Marian Fischman =

American psychologist

- Born: Marian Rita Weinbaum; October 13, 1939; Queens, New York, U.S.
- Died: October 23, 2001 (aged 62); Manhattan, New York, U.S.
- Education: Barnard College (BA); Columbia University (MA); University of Chicago (PhD)
- Occupation: Psychologist
- Spouses: Donald Fischman; Herbert Kleber

Marian Rita Weinbaum Fischman (October 13, 1939 – October 23, 2001) was an American psychologist who researched narcotics and addiction.

== Life ==
Born Marian Rita Weinbaum in Queens, New York, Fischman lived her early years in an apartment above her father's drugstore. She attended Barnard College before completing a master's in psychology at Columbia University and a doctorate from the University of Chicago. Her thesis addressed the effects of methamphetamine on Rhesus monkeys and "found persisting effects on decreased dopamine and serotonin in the Rhesus monkey brain, suggesting long-term damage."

In 1984, she began research on cocaine and other drugs at Johns Hopkins University in Baltimore and began to examine, in physiology, how healthy, nonincarcerated human cocaine users become psychologically tolerant to larger and larger doses. To do so, she set up a residential laboratory where users could live free for up to four weeks at a time while studies continued.

According to her obituary,

The addicts she recruited for her experiments were given drugs, food, hospital rooms with sound and video equipment, and pay. She also made an open offer to help any addict get treatment, but none of her subjects accepted.

Fischman met her second husband, Herbert Kleber, at a scientific meeting in Washington D.C. in 1987. Together they founded a research center in drug addiction at Columbia University in 1992 and Fischman was appointed a professor with tenure at Columbia.

According to Kleber, Fischman was "the first research scientist since Freud to use controlled scientific experiments with humans to directly examine cocaine's effects." As co-director of one of the center's divisions, she managed five laboratories where studies were conducted to measure how patients changed physiologically and behaviorally when they were under the influence of drugs. Her models went on to become an established basis for studying potential medications to treat drug abuse. She also expanded from her concentration on studying addiction and also tested drugs that were being designed to combat the effects of cocaine and heroin.

Marian Fischman, who first married physician Donald Fischman, died at 62 on October 23, 2001, at NewYork–Presbyterian Hospital from complications with colon cancer. She was survived by Kleber and a son, two daughters, two stepdaughters, mother, and a brother. She was residing in Manhattan at the time of her death.

== Selected works ==
According to WorldCat.org, Fischman is listed as author or co-author of 23 works in 31 publications.

- Fischman, M. W., & Foltin, R. W. (1991). Utility of subjective‐effects measurements in assessing abuse liability of drugs in humans. British journal of addiction, 86(12), 1563-1570.
- Rolls, B. J., Kim-Harris, S., Fischman, M. W., Foltin, R. W., Moran, T. H., & Stoner, S. A. (1994). Satiety after preloads with different amounts of fat and carbohydrate: implications for obesity. The American journal of clinical nutrition, 60(4), 476-487.
- Hatsukami, D. K., & Fischman, M. W. (1996). Crack cocaine and cocaine hydrochloride: Are the differences myth or reality?. Jama, 276(19), 1580-1588.
- Haney, M., Ward, A. S., Comer, S. D., Foltin, R. W., & Fischman, M. W. (1999). Abstinence symptoms following smoked marijuana in humans. Psychopharmacology, 141(4), 395-404.
- Hart, C. L., Van Gorp, W., Haney, M., Foltin, R. W., & Fischman, M. W. (2001). Effects of acute smoked marijuana on complex cognitive performance. Neuropsychopharmacology, 25(5), 757-765.
- Martinez, D., Broft, A., Foltin, R. W., Slifstein, M., Hwang, D. R., Huang, Y., ... & Laruelle, M. (2004). Cocaine dependence and D 2 receptor availability in the functional subdivisions of the striatum: relationship with cocaine-seeking behavior. Neuropsychopharmacology, 29(6), 1190-1202.
- Martinez, D., Narendran, R., Foltin, R. W., Slifstein, M., Hwang, D. R., Broft, A., ... & Laruelle, M. (2007). Amphetamine-induced dopamine release: markedly blunted in cocaine dependence and predictive of the choice to self-administer cocaine. American Journal of Psychiatry, 164(4), 622-629.
