= Psychedelia (film) =

Film about the history of psychedelic drugs

- Film poster
- Directed by: Pat Murphy
- Written by: Pat Murphy
- Produced by: Pat Murphy
- Narrated by: Stephanie Willing
- Cinematography: Stavros Basis, Pat Murphy, Alden Peters
- Edited by: Pat Murphy
- Production company: Hard Rain Films
- Release date: September 8, 2015 (DocUtah)
- Running time: 60 minutes
- Country: United States
- Language: English

Psychedelia is an American documentary film from Hard Rain Films, that has been released in a revised and updated version in 2021. The film discusses the history of psychedelic drugs and their ability to produce mystical experiences. The therapeutic role of such drugs is considered, and controlled research studies conducted before the 1960s, at a time when such drugs were considered to be some of the most promising discoveries in the field of psychiatry, are discussed. Several study participant users are interviewed. The film was a winner for best documentary film at the New Jersey International Film Festival, and was an official selection at the Southern Utah International Documentary Film Festival (DOCUTAH) and the Orlando Film Festival.

== Participants ==
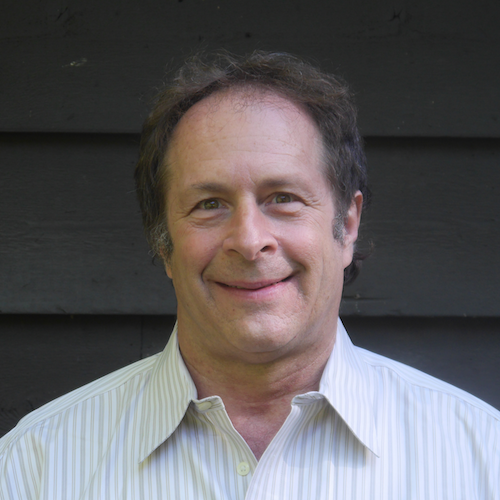
Rick Doblin, Ph.D.

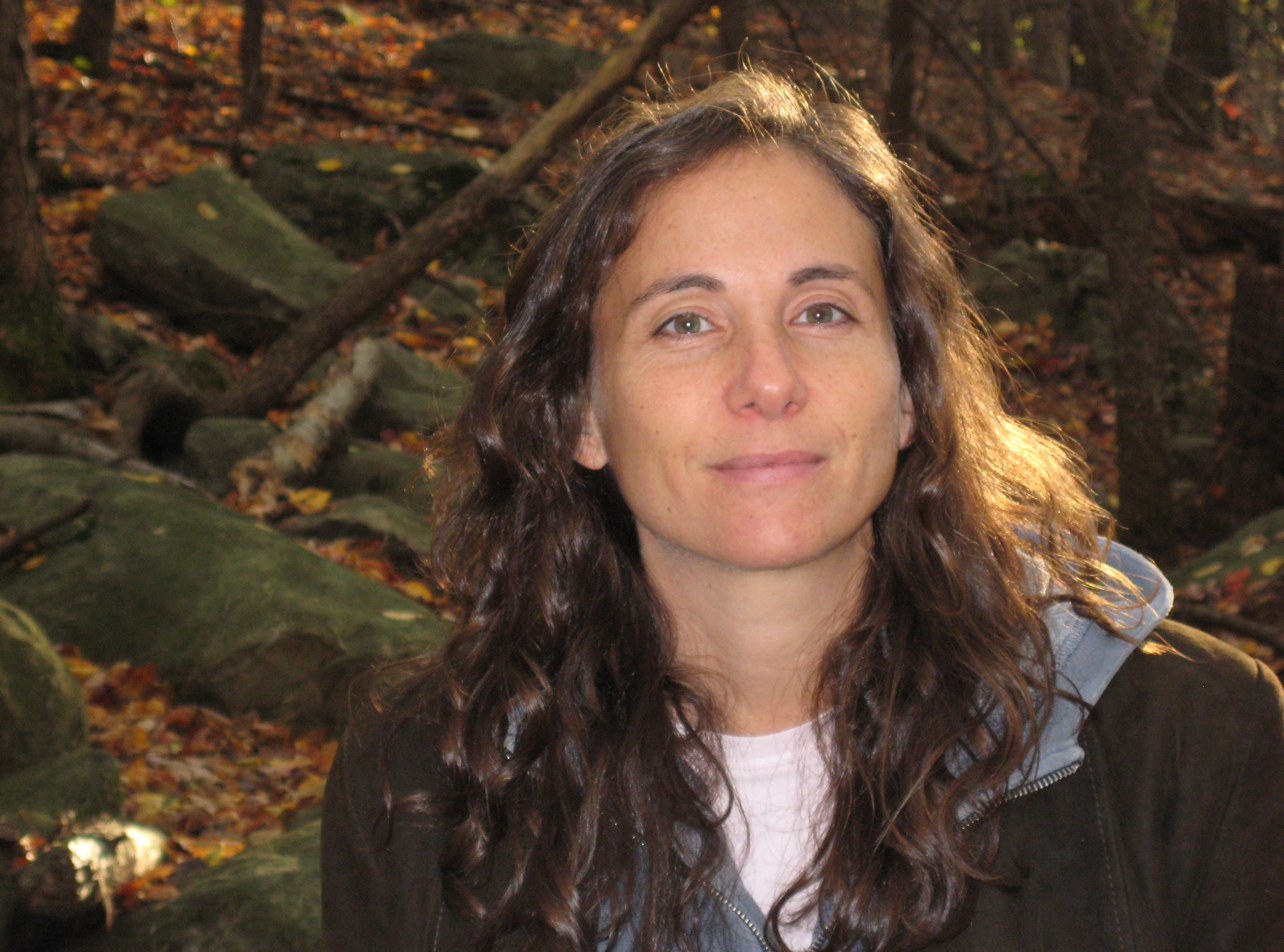
Julie Holland, MD

The documentary film is narrated by Stephanie Willing, and includes the following participants (alphabetized by last name):

- Dinah Bazar – Study participant
- Anthony Bossi, Ph.D. – NYU School of Medicine
- Robert Cohen, Ph.D. – New York University
- Gale Cowan – Study participant
- Rick Doblin, Ph.D. – Founder of MAPS
- Nick Fernandez – Study participant
- Ingmar Gorman, Ph.D. – Psychologist
- Charles S. Grob, MD – Psychiatrist, UCLA
- Jeffrey Guss, MD – NYU School of Medicine
- Julie Holland, MD – Psychiatrist
- Mathew Johnson, Ph.D. – Johns Hopkins University School of Medicine
- Herbert Kleber, MD – New York State Psychiatric Institute
- Katherine MacLean, Ph.D. – Research Scientist
- Stephen Ross, MD – NYU School of Medicine
- Rob Sweeney – Study participant
- Estalyn Walcoff – Study participant
