= Mungo Thomson =

American visual artist

- Born: 1969 (age 56–57); Woodland, California, US
- Education: University of California, Los Angeles, University of California, Santa Cruz
- Known for: Film, sound, installation, sculpture, drawings, books
- Movement: Conceptual art
- Awards: Guggenheim Fellowship; Louis Comfort Tiffany Foundation; California Community Foundation; USArtists International
- Website: Mungo Thomson

Mungo Thomson, Time Life Volume 5. Sideways Thought, 4K video with sound, 8:09 minutes, original score by Ernst Karel, 2020–22, Installation view, Walker Art Center.

Mungo Thomson (born 1969) is a contemporary visual artist based in Los Angeles. His wide-ranging, often serial work explores mass culture, everyday perception, representation and cosmology through films, sound, sculpture, installations, drawings and books. Thomson employs counterintuitive artmaking strategies and unconventional methods of audience engagement that privilege overlooked aspects of experience, subtle humor, and the dislodging of expectations. Critics place his work within the tradition of West Coast conceptual art, while also noting its incorporation of the divergent vocabularies of minimalism and the Northern Californian counterculture, New Age mysticism and popular science. Critic Francesco Tenaglia notes that Thomson's later work updates themes of the Pictures Generation and appropriation art: "Using techniques such as mounting, erasing and reframing, he successfully addresses issues such as the permanence of the image, its value and status, and the emergence of aesthetic practices from the diffusion of technological media."

Thomson's work belongs to public collections including those of the Museum of Contemporary Art, Los Angeles, Whitney Museum, Los Angeles County Museum of Art (LACMA), and Walker Art Center. He has exhibited at those four venues, as well as at the Hammer Museum, Stedelijk Museum voor Actuele Kunst (S.M.A.K.) and MUDAM, among others. In 2025, Thomson was awarded a Guggenheim Fellowship.

== Education and career ==
Thomson was born in Woodland, California in 1969 and raised in Northern California. He completed a BA at University of California, Santa Cruz in 1991 and attended the Whitney Museum Independent Study Program in 1994, where he worked with conceptual artist Mary Kelly. In 2000, he earned an MFA from University of California, Los Angeles (UCLA), studying with John Baldessari, among others.

In his first professional decade, Thomson appeared in group shows at the New Museum and SculptureCenter in New York, the Museum of Contemporary Art, Chicago, Hirshhorn Museum and Orange County Museum of Art, as well as in the Whitney Biennial (2008) and the inaugural Performa Biennial (2005). His early solo exhibitions took place at Margo Leavin Gallery (Los Angeles), John Connelly Presents (New York), Galleria d'Arte Moderna e Contemporanea (GAMeC), Kadist Art Foundation (Paris), and the Hammer Museum.

Thomson has had subsequent solo exhibitions at the Aspen Art Museum, Contemporary Art Gallery (Vancouver), SITE Santa Fe, Henry Art Gallery, Walker Art Center, and galleries including Galerie Frank Elbaz (Paris) and Karma (New York and Los Angeles).

== Work and reception ==
Thomson has been described as a "second-wave" conceptual artist whose work is open to pop and pictorial strategies, media and consumer culture, and the interference of everyday life. Critic Martin Herbert suggests that Thomson fuses exclusive practices (conceptualism, minimalism) to the inclusive ethos of avant-garde composer John Cage, taking a "broader interest in privileging access, in disseminating an open-ended, chancy art about an expanding sense of context … specifically, through artworks that both move into public arenas and put democratic spins on high-art reference points."

Thomson's art emphasizes context—the lenses and frames through which people encounter the world—over personal expression. He superimposes, re-translates or inverts different realms of thought and experience, using structuring systems and premises, subtractive methods or iterative processes that build from discrete parts (film frames, book pages, CMYK dots). While these methods can involve an exacting sense of production, they frequently obscure any trace of the artist's "hand," creating a sense of the work having already existed—an impression bolstered by Thomson's preference for found objects, appropriated mass-culture forms and experiential phenomena as sources. A common strategy involves focusing on largely ignored background elements through processes of erasure, editing or reframing in order to raise questions about status, attention and access.

Thomson's work is equally attuned to time, often juxtaposing different modes—measured, experiential, geological—to bring the theme to awareness. Many of his projects function like archives, registering not only movement through time but also cultural change—and consequently loss—as objects, styles and technologies become unfashionable or obsolete. Several critics note in his work a sense of melancholy, rueful humor—what Frieze's Megan Ratner called "a sunshine bleakness [in Thomson's] distinctly Californian work."

Thomson's solo exhibitions have generally featured disparate objects, drawings, films and sound pieces in combinations that Los Angeles Times critic Christopher Knight first described as "wryly engaging" and characterized by a "gentle discord, in which perception, memory and imagination compete." His sculptural objects have often riffed on familiar types and images from mainstream and alternative culture, fine and folk art, and Americana, inspiring double-takes at their unexpected juxtapositions of consumer goods, artisanal craftsmanship and political or populist content.

Mungo Thomson, Coat Check Chimes, Nickel-plated aluminum and steel, 1200 pieces, dimensions variable, Installation view, 2008 Whitney Biennial exhibition.

=== Sound projects and early films ===
Thomson's sound works date back to his time at UCLA, when he sought to break from conventional modes of artmaking with works such as Room Tone (1998), a CD recording of the ambient sound of his studio that listeners could superimpose onto their own spaces. He continued to explore atmospherics and human presence with his "Wind Chimes" (1999–2004), which ironically hung in indoor galleries lacking any breeze, thus requiring visitor activation. The series culminated in Coat Check Chimes (2008, Whitney Biennial), for which Thomson hung 1,200 specially-fabricated, tuned metal hangers from the motorized rack system in the museum's cloakroom. The hangers functioned like orchestral triangles, their movement creating a Cagean musical overture that framed the broader show. Emanating from an overlooked, purely functional "dead zone" of the museum, the sound changed according to time of day, weather, and number and type of coats being checked, forming a dialogue centered on service staff and visitors.

For Crickets (2012–14; Pacific Standard Time, the High Line), Thomson and composer Michael Webster transcribed field recordings of crickets from around the world and orchestrated them into musical movements for performance by classical musicians. The final work (a life-size video projection of a 17-piece ensemble performance, an installation, embossed sheet music and an artist book) played with shifting phenomenological and institutional contexts and registers of "high" and "low" art—formally dressed musicians simulating a common insect sound, "crickets" signifying audience silence. Critic Kate Green noted, "The beauty of Thomson’s attempts to represent nature through conceptual strategies is that, paradoxically, they drain it of its magic. The results suggest the impossibility of the task, and in so doing evoke the particular wonders of nature and of art."

Mungo Thomson, Negative Space (STScI-PRC2007-41a) and Negative Space (STScI-PRC2003-24), Photographic murals, 136" x 150", 250" x 585" and 250" x 255", all 2008, Installation view, Hammer Museum.

In several projects Thomson used a subtractive approach to consider the periphery and notions of the void. The Collected Live Recordings of Bob Dylan, 1963–1995 (1999) involved three decades of live recordings in which he edited out the music, leaving 25 minutes of wave-like applause and crowd noise; recalling New Age recordings of rain, the CD (advertised on posters and bus benches) played in full at night on several Los Angeles radio stations. For The American Desert (for Chuck Jones) (2002) he erased the characters from twenty-five Road Runner cartoons, leaving an archival montage of uninhabited, comically surreal backdrops and "camera" pans, sweeps and zooms that seemed to comment on the mythological American West, the void of the desert and manifest destiny. The Swordsman (2004) focused on the off-screen void of film through a looped video of retired Hollywood "sword master" Bob Anderson re-enacting his (typically out-of-frame) toss of a prop sword to movie action heroes.

Thomson also looked at these themes in printed projects, such as the tabloid People (2011), in which he digitally erased all the artworks from repurposed photographs of art fairs, galleries and museums, refocusing attention on the gestures, attitudes and styles of spectators contemplating empty walls and booths. For the wall murals and book Negative Space (2008, Hammer Museum), he inverted the hues and values of Hubble Telescope deep-cosmos images, transposing dark voids into luminous décor that recalled marble, psychedelia and Light and Space art worthy of aesthetic attention. Thomson also created permanent installations of the project for the University of California Berkeley, University of California San Francisco and Los Angeles Metro.

=== Time-related and archive projects ===
Thomson has frequently explored time, often using additive formats (the archive, stop-action "flicker-style" films) and analog reference points. Untitled (Margo Leavin) (2009) was a stop-motion Super-16mm animation offering a near-archeological presentation of the well-known gallerist's Rolodex—both the physical apparatus and its contents: artist, collector and celebrity contacts flipped through card-by-card. The film concisely mapped and retrospected an obsolete information technology and a vanishing art world community and era (the gallery since closed).

June 25, 2001 (How the Universe Will End); Reflected: March 6, 1995 (When Did the Universe Begin?), Enamel on low-iron mirror, poplar and anodized aluminum, 74" x 56" x 2.5" each, both 2012. Installation view, Gavin Brown's Enterprise.

Thomson's TIME body of work (2009– ) examines the popular magazine as a repository of time itself across a range of media. The time-lapse video Untitled (TIME) (2010) scrolled through the magazine's covers to date, depicting its evolving design, changing topics and framing of life over nearly a century, in the process highlighting a sense of ephemerality and idiosyncrasy rather than coherence. His mirrored TIME series (2012– ) positioned viewers as subjects, their reflections caught inside life-sized mirrors silkscreened with only the periodical's red-bordered cover frame and masthead from specially chosen issues. The mirrors reflected one another (depending on vantage point), generating a hall-of-mirrors effect and a slightly wavy funhouse quality that suggested a commentary on vanity, fame and mortality.

Three projects broached contemporary flows of culture, nature and time. For Mail (2013–18, a series of installations and an artist book), Thomson asked venues to let their incoming mail accumulate and amass in a pile, unopened, during the run of an exhibition, creating a work that functioned as a timepiece, installation, archive and exposé of institutional function, including waste. The "Snowman" series (2020– ) consists of uncanny, realistic painted bronze fabrications of stacked Amazon packages that connect consumption, climate change and weather through an analogy between the assembly and disassembly (melting) of a snowman and a stack of delivered boxes. The large, two-sided, backlit Wall Calendars (2019– ) featured iconic nature settings appropriated from popular print calendars; they were overlaid with calendar grids in reverse (as if the back side of a page was seen through filtering light), juxtaposing human time with geological time.

Thomson's Time Life video project (2014– ) examines instruction, process, archive and the diffusion of technology. It has included eight rapidly edited stop-motion "volumes" scored to percussive and electronic music, whose images he photographed page by page from vintage reference books (several actual Time-Life guides), mimicking how materials are now digitized for data archiving. Each brings an encyclopedic scope to a single theme—food, flowers, color, exercise and sport, the sculptural oeuvre of Rodin (Volume 5. Sideways Thought), search-engine-style questions and knot-tying. Nonetheless, critic Hal Foster observed that the series' editing, framing and evident staging undercut the instructional genre it derived from, achieving a "how-not-to aspect [that is] a function of the out-of-date status of the source materials … the implication [being] that each new medium all but destroys the ones before it."

== Recognition ==
Thomson's work belongs to the collections of the Berkeley Art Museum and Pacific Film Archive, British Council, Colección Jumex, di Rosa Center, FRAC Île-de-France, GAMeC, Hammer Museum, Henry Art Gallery, Hirshhorn Museum, Kadist Art Foundation, LACMA, Museum of Contemporary Art Los Angeles, Museum of Contemporary Art San Diego, Museum of Fine Arts, Houston, Orange County Museum of Art, Seattle Art Museum, Tang Museum, Tate, Walker Art Center and Whitney Museum, among others.

Thomson has received a Guggenheim Fellowship (2025), Louis Comfort Tiffany Foundation award (2013), California Community Foundation fellowship (2011), USArtists International grant (2003), and artist residencies from the Guangzhou Times Museum, Arcadia Summer Arts Program and Stichting Kaus Australis (Netherlands).

== See also ==
- Iain Thomson (his brother)
