= Ski Inn =

Bar and restaurant in Bombay Beach, California, US

Coordinates: 33.353632°N 115.73356899999999°W

- Ski-Inn Diner
- Interactive map of Ski Inn
- Location: 9596 Avenue A, Niland, CA 92257
- Type: Bar/Restaurant

Ski Inn is a bar and restaurant in Bombay Beach, California. The Ski Inn purports to be the "lowest bar in the western hemisphere" at 223 feet or 68 meters below sea level. The name refers to water skiing and not snow skiing.

== History ==
Originally, there were five bars in Bombay Beach. However, it is now one of two bars in town, the other being the local American Legion. The bar has been under the same ownership for more than a quarter of a century. The band Heat Hell and Winter played 1950s cover songs there. At one point, the Ski Inn had a video poker machine. It is popular among local residents.

A visitor to the Inn in early 2019 filed this description:

The Ski Inn has lasted this long thanks mainly to snowbirds; retired folks in RVs seeking a mild winter at mineral bath resorts a few miles uphill. Groups will show up at the Ski Inn to chat over beers, and keep up a habit that started in the 1950s, when vacationers would write their names on dollar bills and stick them to the walls. Decades on, uncounted thousands of dollar bills plaster the place like wallpaper, covering every wall, door, ceiling, and even ceiling fan blade."

== Reception ==
Dollar bills cover the interior.

Desert Magazine said the Ski Inn was one of the "only alive places I notice in this ghost town" and "worth a stop: Have a beer and hear some stories of the sea’s days gone by." LA Weekly's Hayley Fox called it a "charismatic dive" and recommended having "a beer and a burger." Palm Springs Life's Karen Graninger implored that "the cheeseburger and potato salad will fill you up nicely." KCET's Sandi Hemmerlein liked it for the "patty melt and exploring the remains of the town that have been consumed by floods and sand."

Vice's Jamie Lee Curtis Taete reviewed their meal with "The grilled cheese tasted exactly like the fries, which tasted exactly like the salad. Literally every dish on my plate tasted exactly like accidentally swallowing bath water." The Independent's Tim Walker remarked "It boasts a passable $5 burger and a handful of friendly, elderly regulars: the men and women who stayed when the world went away." Time Out Los Angeles's Kate Wertheimer suggested to "stop by for a drink or a greasy bite and decorate a dollar bill to hang on the wall or ceiling."

== In popular culture ==
The Ski Inn has been featured in media by Anthony Bourdain and John Waters. Bourdain lunched there in a fourth season episode of Anthony Bourdain: No Reservations. It was used as a filming location in an episode of The Mentalist where it was renamed "Borrego Gap Diner."

== See also ==
- List of diners
