= Iain Thomson =

American philosopher (b. 1968)

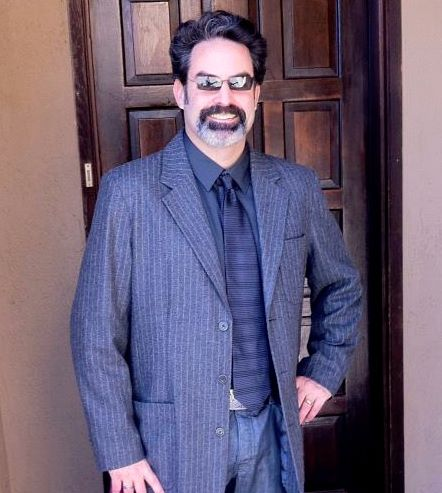
- Born: Iain Donald Thomson; 1968 (age 57–58)

Education
- Education: University of California, Berkeley; University of California, San Diego

Philosophical work
- Era: Contemporary philosophy
- Region: Western philosophy
- School: Continental; Existentialism
- Institutions: University of New Mexico
- Main interests: Philosophy of technology, philosophy of art, philosophy of literature, philosophy of education, philosophy of comics

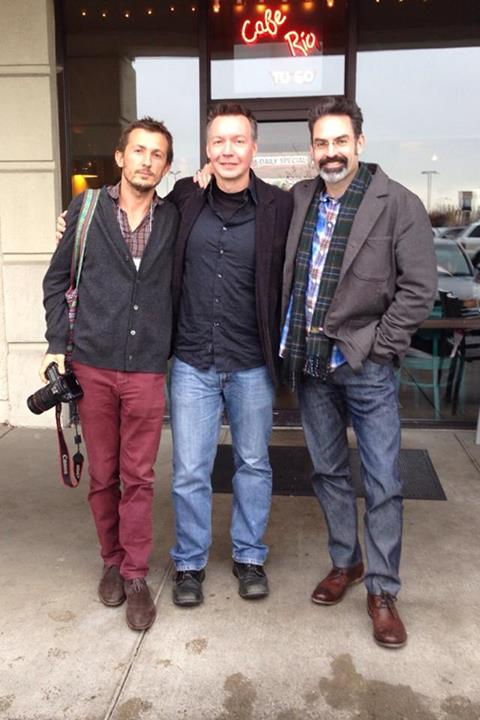
Left to right: Tao Ruspoli, Mark Wrathall and Iain Thomson, November 2013

Iain Donald Thomson (born 1968) is an American philosopher and Distinguished Professor of Philosophy at the University of New Mexico (UNM). He is a well-known expert on Martin Heidegger.

== Education and career ==
Thomson studied as an undergraduate at the University of California, Berkeley, where he worked with Hubert Dreyfus, and then earned his Ph.D. in philosophy at the University of California, San Diego. As a visiting graduate student at UC Irvine, he also studied with Jacques Derrida. He is known for his expertise on Heidegger's philosophy, European philosophy since Kant, philosophy of education, philosophy of technology, philosophy of art, philosophy of literature and environmental philosophy.

Thomson received a National Endowment for the Humanities Research Fellowship and UNM College of Arts and Sciences' Gunter Starkey Teaching Award in 2003. He is featured in Tao Ruspoli's film Being in the World. His articles on Heidegger have been published in such journals as Inquiry, Journal of the History of Philosophy, The Harvard Review of Philosophy, the International Journal of Philosophical Studies, and the Journal of the British Society for Phenomenology.

== Family ==
Thomson's father is psychiatrist Captane "Cap" Thomson, beloved "Doctoring 3" preceptor at UC Davis Medical School.

His younger brother is Mungo Thomson, a contemporary visual artist based in Los Angeles.

== Books ==
- Heidegger on Technology's Danger and Promise in the Age of AI, Cambridge University Press, 2025, ISBN 9781009629430
- Rethinking Death in and after Heidegger, Cambridge University Press, 2024, ISBN 9781009480086
- The Cambridge History of Philosophy, 1945–2015, edited by Kelly Becker and Iain D. Thomson, Cambridge University Press, 2019, ISBN 9781316779651
- Heidegger, Art, and Postmodernity, Cambridge University Press, 2011, ISBN 9780521172493
- Heidegger on Ontotheology: Technology and the Politics of Education, Cambridge University Press, 2005, ISBN 052161659X

== See also ==
- Ontotheology
- The Origin of the Work of Art
- Hubert Dreyfus
- Martin Heidegger
- Jacques Derrida
