= The Pot Book =

2010 book about cannabis edited by Julie Holland

The Pot Book: A Complete Guide to Cannabis
- Author: Julie Holland
- Language: English
- Publisher: Park Street Press
- Publication date: September 23, 2010
- Publication place: United States
- ISBN: 978-1594773686
- OCLC: 937429599
- Website: thepotbook.com

The Pot Book: A Complete Guide to Cannabis is a 2010 book about cannabis edited by Julie Holland M.D., a United States psychiatrist specializing in psychopharmacology. Holland has stated that proceeds from the book's sales will be used to fund further research on cannabis. Holland has also stated that humans and cannabis coevolved.

== See also ==
- List of books about cannabis
