= The Public (alternative newspaper) =

Buffalo-based newspaper

The Public is an alternative newsweekly which publishes 35,000 copies each Wednesday in Buffalo, New York, United States. It focuses on Buffalo-area art, music, culture, and politics. The Public was founded in 2014 when several of the writers and editors of fellow weekly paper, Artvoice left following concerns about that paper's finances and internal conflicts. The former Artvoice contributors were joined by several new contributors. The Public features locally created art on its covers and in weekly centerfolds. The paper is distributed for free throughout the Buffalo-Niagara region. In addition to the print version, all of The Public's content is available at their website, www.dailypublic.com. The website also includes web-exclusive content such as blogs and podcasts.

The Public has journalistic partnerships with Investigative Post, City & State, and Loop Magazine.

== Content ==
In April 2015, Every Time I Die front man Keith Buckley began writing a bi-weekly advice column titled Assisted Living.

Author and documentary film maker Bruce Jackson is also a frequent contributor of political editorials to the paper.
