= Samantha Matherne =

American philosopher

Education
- Education: University of California, Riverside (MA, PhD), University of Pennsylvania (BA, MA)

Philosophical work
- Era: 21st-century philosophy
- Region: Western philosophy
- Institutions: Harvard University
- Main interests: Kantian philosophy, aesthetics
- Website: https://www.samanthamatherne.com/

Samantha Matherne is an American philosopher and Professor of Philosophy at Harvard University. She previously taught at the University of California, Santa Cruz. Matherne is known for her works on aesthetics and Kantian philosophy.

== Books ==
- Seeing More: Kant's Theory of Imagination (Oxford University Press, 2024)
- The Geography of Taste, with Dominic McIver Lopes, Mohan Matthen, and Bence Nanay (Oxford University Press, 2024)
- Edith Landmann-Kalischer: Essays on Art, Aesthetics, and Value, Edited by Samantha Matherne and Translated by Daniel O. Dahlstrom (Oxford University Press, 2023)
- Cassirer (Routledge Philosophers Series) (Routledge, 2021)
