= Charles Grob =

American psychiatrist

Charles S. Grob is a professor of psychiatry and biobehavioral sciences and pediatrics and director of the Division of Child and Adolescent Psychiatry at Harbor–UCLA Medical Center. He received his two BS degrees from Oberlin College and Columbia University, before getting an MD from the State University of New York, Downstate Medical Center. Grob's research interests include anxiety and mood disorders and also self-medication and substance abuse. The FDA approved one of his Phase 1 studies to study the psychological and physiological effects of MDMA and the hallucinogen ayahuasca.

Grob is also the editor of Hallucinogens: A Reader, originally published in 2002. The book is a collection of psychedelic texts covering a wide range of topics, such as shamanism, society, and psilocybin research. It contains excerpts from figureheads of the psychedelic movement, including Terence McKenna, Albert Hofmann, and Ralph Metzner.

== Research projects ==
- The Hoasca Project – Hoasca, also known as ayahuasca, is a plant-based beverage used as a component of ritualistic practices in Brazil by the members of UDV, a syncretic religious movement. It is the most comprehensive and in-depth study done on the relationship between ayahuasca and mental health.
- Psilocybin – Charles Grob conducted a study that observed the effect of psilocybin when used by patients with advanced cancer and existential anxiety. From 2004 to 2008, the research group at Harbor–UCLA Medical Center conducted a double-blind, placebo-controlled investigation examining the safety and efficacy of psilocybin as a treatment for advanced-cancer anxiety. A total of twelve subjects were studied, all of whom tolerated the experimental treatment without adverse effects. In August 2020, the Lundquist Institute announced Grob would co-lead a $1.75M+ study using psilocybin for palliative care of patients near the end of their lives.

== See also ==
- Psychedelia – Film about the history of psychedelic drugs
