= James Ostrer =

British photographer living in London (born 1979)

- Born: 1979 (age 46–47); London, United Kingdom
- Education: Chelsea College of Art, London
- Known for: Photographer
- Notable work: Curator’s Choice, Taylor Wessing Portrait Prize, National Portrait Gallery, London, UK
- Movement: Photography, Film, Installations
- Website: https://www.jamesostrer.com

James Ostrer (born 1979) is a British photographer living in London.

== Early life and family ==
James Ostrer is a British photographer.

== Notable works ==
Curator's Choice: James Ostrer's portrait of Nicky Haslam at the National Portrait Gallery, London.

Co-founder of The Bombay Beach Biennale an annual art festival held in Bombay Beach, California.
