= Shawn Andrews (actor) =

American actor (born 1971)

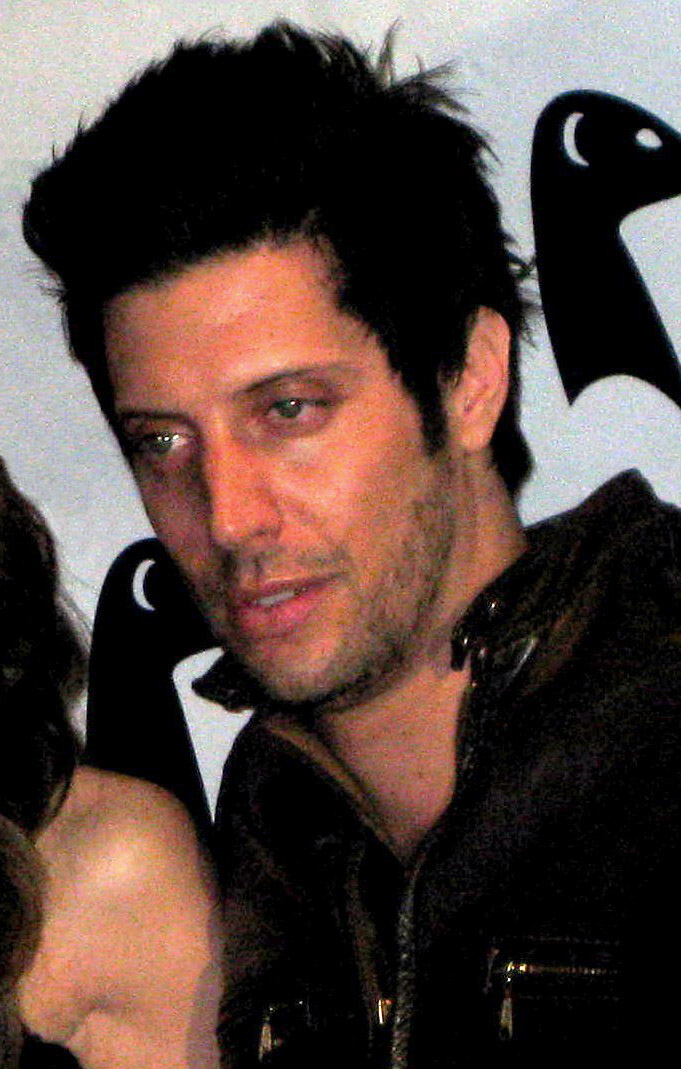
- Andrews in 2009
- Born: October 15, 1971 (age 54)
- Occupation: Actor
- Years active: 1993–2012 2026-
- Spouse: Milla Jovovich (m. 1992; ann. 1992)

Shawn Andrews is an American actor. He is best known for his role as Kevin Pickford in the 1993 Richard Linklater film Dazed and Confused.

== Career ==
Andrews first feature film was the cult film Dazed and Confused, where Andrews was cast as the character Kevin Pickford. He went on to lead roles such as in The Small Hours and City of Ghosts. He played the lead protagonist in Fix, being awarded Best Actor at the Brooklyn Film Festival. Andrews then appeared in Big Heart City, which was nominated for an award at the Los Angeles Film Festival.

In 2026, he returned to acting in the third season of The Walking Dead: Dead City as Reverend Anthony, a survivor in Manhattan who claims to speak to God.

== Personal life ==
In 1992, Andrews was briefly married to Milla Jovovich, who was 16 at the time. The marriage was annulled by Jovovich's mother two months later.

== Filmography ==
Year	Film	Director	Notes
1993	Dazed and Confused	Richard Linklater	
1993	Markie Boy	Dustin Siena	Short film; Bronze Winner at Houston Film Festival
1997	The Small Hours	Derek Dunsay	
1997	The Sleepless	Domonic Paris	
2002	City of Ghosts	Matt Dillon	
2002	After the Flood	Robert Saitzyk	
2008	The Caretaker	Bryce Olson	
2008	Big Heart City	Ben Rodkin	
2008	Fix	Tao Ruspoli	Best Actor Award at the Brooklyn Film Festival
2012	My Little Hollywood	Matthew Harrison	
2026	The Walking Dead: Dead City	various	3 episodes - Reverend Anthony
