= Sean Dorrance Kelly =

American philosopher

Education
- Education: Brown University; University of California, Berkeley

Philosophical work
- Era: Contemporary philosophy
- Region: Western philosophy
- School: Continental; analytic
- Institutions: Princeton University; Harvard University
- Main interests: Phenomenology; existentialism; philosophy of mind; philosophy of perception; philosophy of literature
- Notable ideas: Meta-poiesis

Sean Dorrance Kelly is an American philosopher, currently the Teresa G. and Ferdinand F. Martignetti Professor of Philosophy at Harvard University, and the Dean of Harvard's Arts and Humanities division. He was formerly Faculty Dean of Dunster House, succeeding Roger Porter. He is an expert on phenomenology and philosophy of mind.

== Education and career ==
A graduate of Brown University, he received his PhD from the University of California, Berkeley, in 1998, and was an assistant professor of philosophy at Princeton University from 1999 until 2006, when he moved to Harvard. He is known for his expertise on various aspects of the philosophical, phenomenological, and cognitive neuroscientific nature of human experience. He is featured in Tao Ruspoli's film Being in the World.

Kelly was appointed as Harvard College's dean of Arts and Humanities in April 2024, with his term starting in July. He stepped down as faculty dean of Dunster House effective July 2025 as a result of his appointment. Kelly was succeeded by Taeku Lee.

== Books ==
- The Relevance of Phenomenology to the Philosophy of Language and Mind (Studies in Philosophy), Sean D. Kelly, Routledge, 2000
- All Things Shining: Reading the Western Classics to Find Meaning in a Secular Age, Hubert Dreyfus and Sean Dorrance Kelly, Free Press, 2011

== Articles ==
- Chapter 6. Edmund Husserl and Phenomenology Solomon, Robert C., ed. (2007). The Blackwell Guide to Continental Philosophy. David L. Sherman. Oxford: John Wiley & Sons. ISBN 978-1-4051-4304-2. OCLC 437147422.

== See also ==
- Critique of technology
- Hubert Dreyfus
