= Julie Holland =

Author, psychiatrist and psychopharmacologist

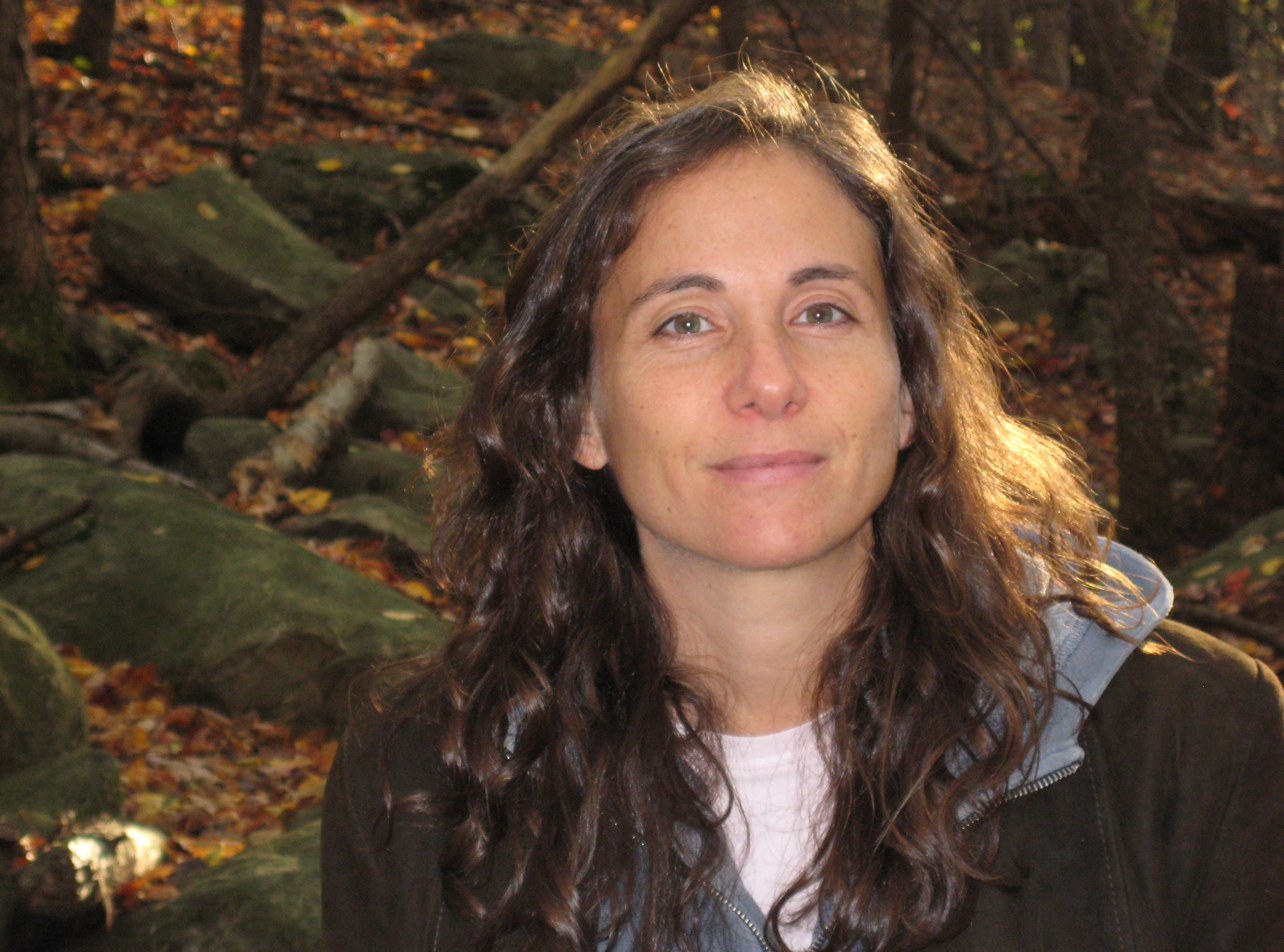
- Holland in 2013
- Born: December 13, 1965 (age 60); Framingham, Massachusetts
- Education: University of Pennsylvania; Temple University School of Medicine
- Occupations: Psychopharmacologist, psychiatrist, author, lecturer
- Website: drholland.com

Julie Holland (born December 13, 1965) is an American psychiatrist and author. Her five books include NYT Bestseller Weekends at Bellevue: Nine Years on the Night Shift at the Psych ER, a memoir documenting her experience as the weekend attending of the psychiatric emergency room at Bellevue Hospital in New York City An advocate for the appropriate use of consciousness expanding substances as part of mental health treatment, she was a medical monitor for early MAPS studies, which involve, in part, developing psychedelics into prescription medication.

== Personal background ==
Julie Holland was born on December 13, 1965 and grew up in Framingham, Massachusetts, a suburb of Boston.

She attended the University of Pennsylvania, where she majored in the Biological Basis of Behavior, a series of courses combining the study of psychology and neural sciences, with a concentration in psychopharmacology. She received her medical degree from Temple University; during her residency, at Mount Sinai Hospital in New York, she served as Chief Resident of the Schizophrenia Research Ward. A principal investigator in a research study examining a new medication for schizophrenia, Holland earned a National Institute of Health Outstanding Resident Award in 1994.

While at Penn, Holland wrote an extensive research paper on MDMA; it became the foundation for her 2001 book Ecstasy: The Complete Guide.

== Professional background ==
From 1995 through 2004, Holland was an attending psychiatrist in the Comprehensive Psychiatric Emergency Program at Bellevue Hospital in New York. Her national bestseller, Weekends at Bellevue: Nine Years on the Night Shift at the Psych ER, was published in 2010. In describing the book, The New York Times wrote: "Dr. Holland brings readers into the psychiatric emergency room, where she was in charge on weekends for nine years. She explains the language, characters, policies and politics of the highly charged environment of caring for those in crisis. At the same, she walks readers through her mind and its substantial struggles. The book is as much a story about her own internal dramas as it is about mental health care in New York City." Weekends at Bellevue was optioned by a joint venture between NBCUniversal and Fox for a television pilot in 2011; the pilot was not picked up. In November 2013, The Hollywood Reporter reported that HBO was developing a comedy written by Diablo Cody based on Holland's book Moody Bitches: The Truth About the Drugs You're Taking, the Sex You're Not Having, The Sleep You're Missing and What's Really Making You Crazy.

From 1995 through 2012, Holland was an Assistant Clinical Professor of Psychiatry at the New York University School of Medicine.

Now a medical advisor to MAPS, Holland was the medical monitor for several therapeutic studies of MDMA assisted psychotherapy in the treatment of Post Traumatic Stress Disorder. In addition to serving as a forensic consultant for drug-related cases, Holland is a frequent lecturer, and has appeared as a drug and behavior expert on CNN, National Geographic Channel, Fox, VH1, MTV and Good Morning America. She has appeared on The Today Show over twenty-five times and is in private practice in New York.

== Honors and awards ==
- 2011: Norman Zinberg Award for Medical Excellence
- National Institute of Health Outstanding Resident Award

== Published works ==
Books

- Holland, Julie (2001). Ecstasy: The Complete Guide: A Comprehensive Look at the Risks and Benefits of MDMA, New York: Park Street Press, ISBN 0892818573
- Holland, Julie (2010). The Pot Book: A Complete Guide to Cannabis, New York: Park Street Press, ISBN 1594773688
- Holland, Julie (2010). Weekends at Bellevue: Nine Years on the Night Shift at the Psych ER, New York: Bantam, ISBN 0553386522
- Holland, Julie (2015). Moody Bitches: The Truth About the Drugs You're Taking, the Sleep You're Missing, the Sex You're Not Having, and What's Really Making You Crazy, New York, Penguin Press, ISBN 978-1-59420-580-4
- Holland, Julie (2020). Good Chemistry: The Science of Connection, from Soul to Psychedelics , New York; Harper Wave, ISBN 978-0062862884

Papers

- Feduccia, A. A., Jerome, L., Mithoefer, M. C., & Holland, J. (2020). Discontinuation of medications classified as reuptake inhibitors affects treatment response of MDMA-assisted psychotherapy. Psychopharmacology, 1–8.
- Mithoefer, M. C., Mithoefer, A. T., Feduccia, A. A., Jerome, L., Wagner, M., Wymer, J., Holland, J. ... & Doblin, R. (2018). 3, 4-methylenedioxymethamphetamine (MDMA)-assisted psychotherapy for post-traumatic stress disorder in military veterans, firefighters, and police officers: a randomised, double-blind, dose-response, phase 2 clinical trial. The Lancet Psychiatry, 5(6), 486–497.
- Feduccia, A. A., Mithoefer, M. C., Jerome, L., Holland, J., Emerson, A., & Doblin, R. (2018). Response to the consensus statement of the PTSD Psychopharmacology Working Group. Biological psychiatry, 84(2), e21-e22.
- Feduccia, A. A., Holland, J., & Mithoefer, M. C. (2018). Progress and promise for the MDMA drug development program. Psychopharmacology, 1–11.
- Doblin, R., Greer, G., Holland, J., Jerome, L., Mithoefer, M. C., & Sessa, B. (2014). A reconsideration and response to Parrott AC (2013)“Human psychobiology of MDMA or ‘Ecstasy’: an overview of 25 years of empirical research”. Human Psychopharmacology: Clinical and Experimental, 29(2), 105–108.
- Holland, J.A.; Nelson, L.W.; Ravikumar, P.R. (1998). "Embalming Fluid-Soaked Drugs: New Drug or New Guise for PHP?". Journal of Psychoactive Drugs. 30 (2): 215–219. doi:10.1080/02791072.1998.10399693. PMID 9692385.
- Holland, Julie; Riley, Kevin C. "Characterizing Auditory Hallucinations: An Aid in the Differential Diagnosis of Malingering". Inch.com. Archived from the original on November 9, 2017.
- Brašić, JR; Holland, JA (2006). "Reliable classification of case-control studies of autistic disorder and obstetric complications". J Dev Phys Disabil. 18 (4): 355–381. doi:10.1007/s10882-006-9021-9.
- Holland, Julie (1999). "Positron emission tomography findings in heavy users of MDMA". The Lancet. 353 (9152): 592–3. doi:10.1016/S0140-6736(05)75651-8. PMID 10029009. S2CID 29187803.
- Holland, Julie (Summer 1997). "Conference Highlights: Hallucinogenic Drugs in Experimental Psychiatric Research; Vaals, Netherlands - March 13-15, 1997". Journal of the Multidisciplinary Association for Psychedelic Studies. 7 (3). MAPS: 31–36.
- Holland, Julie (Summer 1993). "Raves for Research or Psychedelic Researchers: the Next Generation". Journal of the Multidisciplinary Association for Psychedelic Studies. 4 (2). MAPS: 40–42.

== See also ==
- Psychedelia – Film about the history of psychedelic drugs
