= Sean Andrews =

Sean Andrews can refer to:

- Sean Andrews (cricketer, born 1973), South African cricketer
- Sean Andrews (cricketer, born 1978), South African cricketer
- Sean Andrews (EastEnders), fictional character on BBC soap opera EastEnders

== See also ==
- Shawn Andrews (disambiguation)
