= Fix (film) =

- Theatrical release poster
- Directed by: Tao Ruspoli
- Written by: Tao Ruspoli; Jeremy Fels
- Produced by: Nat Dinga
- Starring: Shawn Andrews; Olivia Wilde; Megalyn Echikunwoke; Tao Ruspoli; Dedee Pfeiffer; Andrew Fiscella; Jakob Von Eichel
- Cinematography: Tao Ruspoli; Christopher Gallo
- Edited by: Paul Forte
- Release date: April 2008 (Newport Beach International Film Festival)
- Running time: 93 minutes
- Country: United States
- Language: English

Fix is a 2008 feature film directed by Tao Ruspoli starring Shawn Andrews and Olivia Wilde. Ruspoli himself also co-stars as a filmmaker shooting a first-person documentary about a race against time to raise funds to get his brother into rehab. Also appearing in the film are Megalyn Echikunwoke, Tao Ruspoli, Dedee Pfeiffer and Andrew Fiscella.

== Plot ==
Racing across Los Angeles in one, unwieldy day, documentary filmmakers Bella and Milo race from Beverly Hills to Watts and places in between to get Milo's brother Leo from jail to rehab before 8pm, or Leo goes to prison for three years. A story inspired by true events, the trio documents their trip from a suburban police station in Calabasas through mansions in Beverly Hills, East LA chop-shops, rural wastelands, and housing projects in Watts as they attempt to raise the $5,000 required to get Leo into the rehab clinic.

Along the way encountering dozens of colorful characters, each with their own anomalous perspective on Leo's larger than life personality and style, and each with their own excuse for why they cannot help out. In the end, it may take a drug deal to get the necessary funds for rehab.

== Cast ==
- Shawn Andrews as Leo
- Olivia Wilde as Bella
- Megalyn Echikunwoke as Carmen
- Tao Ruspoli as Milo
- Dedee Pfeiffer as Daphne
- Andrew Fiscella as Harry K. Rothstein

== Reception ==
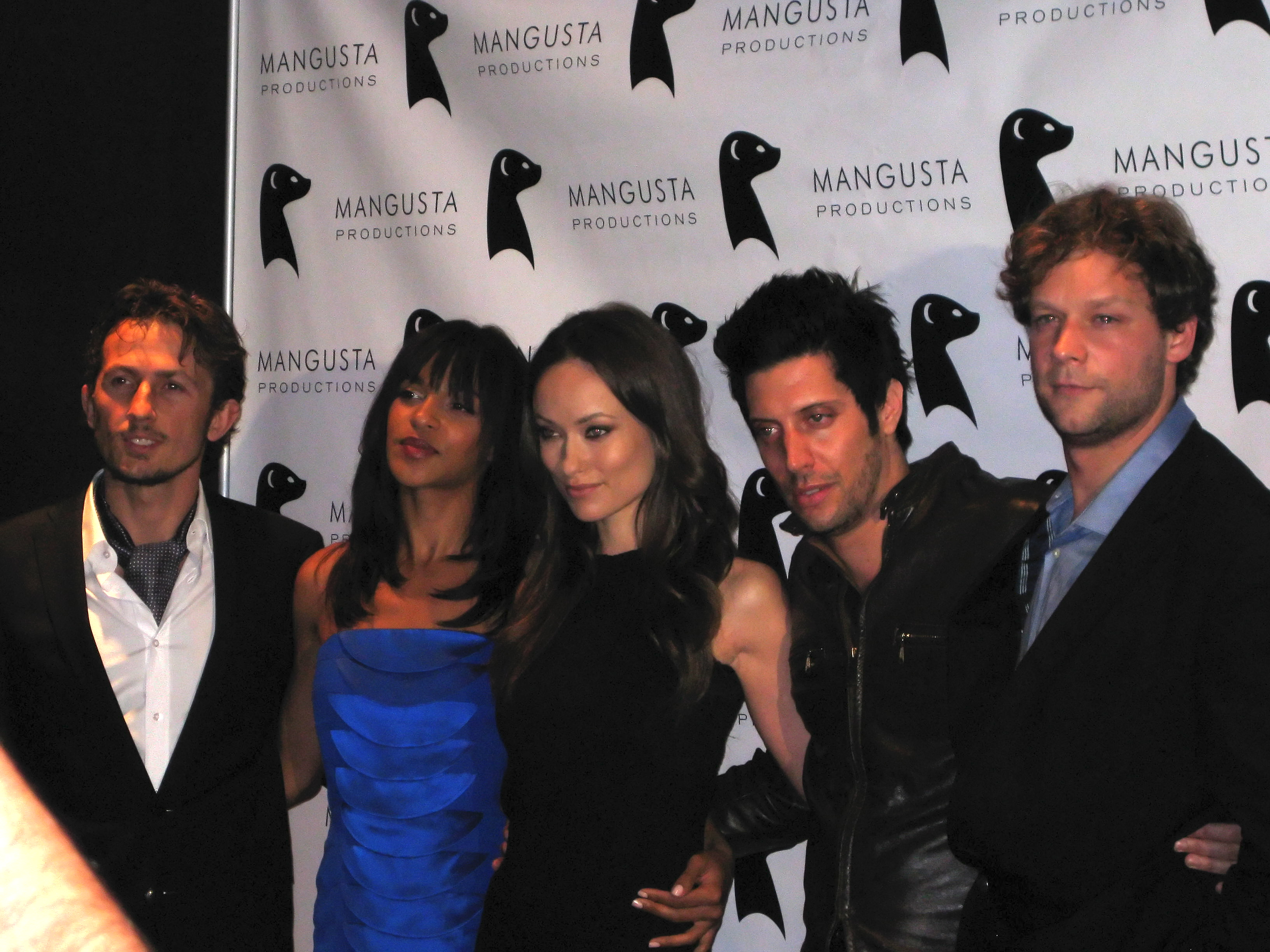
Some of the cast of Fix at the New York City premiere. Left-to-right: Tao Ruspoli, Megalyn Echikunwoke, Olivia Wilde, Shawn Andrews, Jakob Von Eichel.

Fix premiered at the Slamdance Film Festival on January 18, 2008 at 6PM in a packed theater followed by good reviews in Variety and indieWIRE. Following Slamdance, Fix screened as part of the Santa Barbara International Film Festival where Director Tao Ruspoli won the Heineken Red Star Award for innovative film making.

Fix won the top prize for best feature film at the 2008 Vail Film Festival and the best film award at the 2008 Twin Rivers Media Festival. Fix then won The Grand Chameleon award at the 11th Brooklyn International Film Festival, as well as the Best Feature Film prize and the Best Male Actor prize (Shawn Andrews.)

Fix also won the Audience Award at Moviesauce.

== Production ==
Fix was filmed in Los Angeles in the summer of 2007 in 18 days and shot on the Panasonic HVX200. Directed by Tao Ruspoli, Written by Jeremy Fels and Tao Ruspoli, Produced by Nat Dinga, Associate Producer Bizhan Tong, Camera (color, Sony HDcam), Christopher Gallo, Ruspoli; Editor, Paul Forte; Music Supervisor, Bryan Ling; Casting, David Rapaport C.S.A & Lindsay Kroeger C.S.A., Production Designers, Sarah Osbourne, Erin Eagleton.
