= Mark Wrathall =

American philosopher

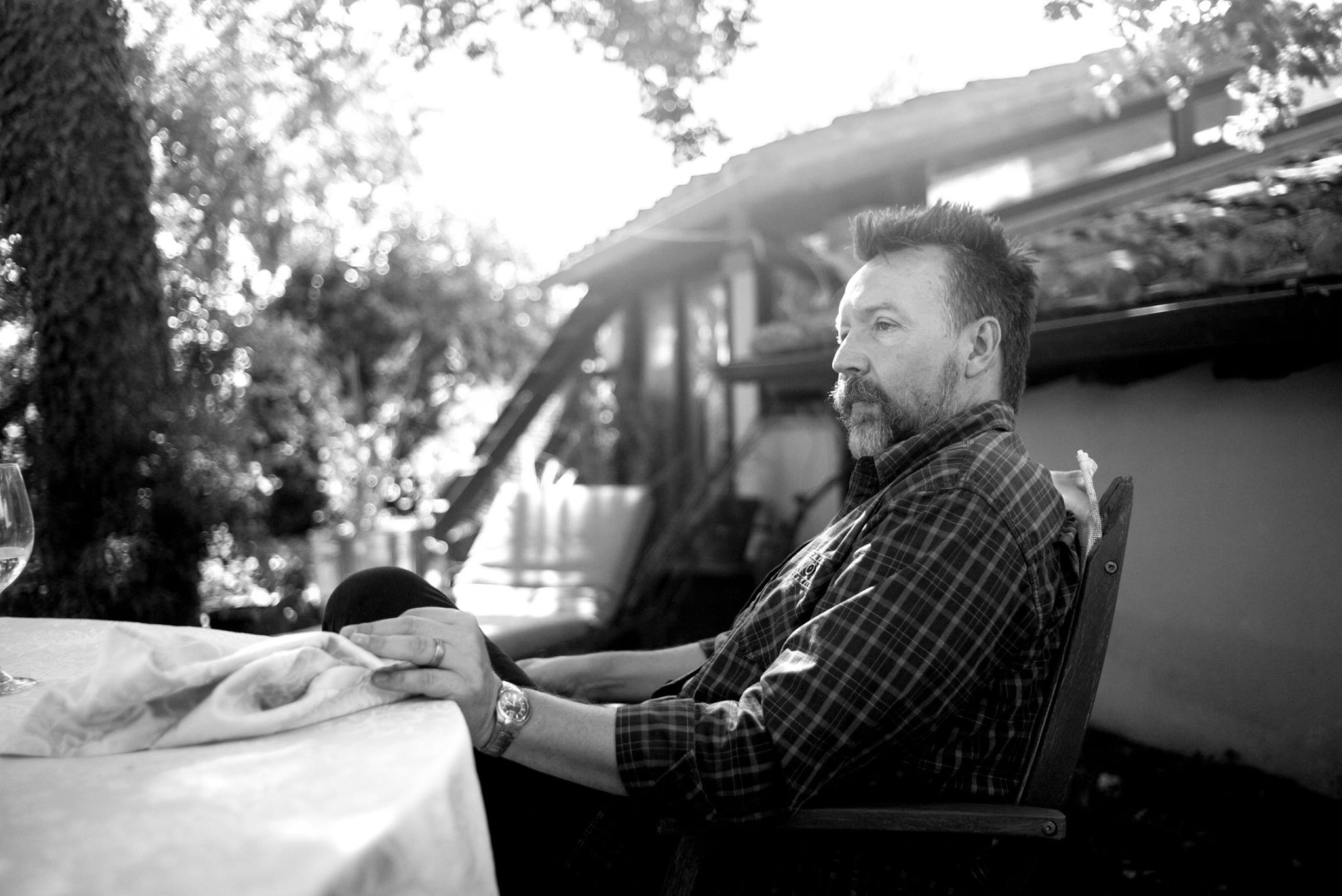
- Mark Wrathall, photo by Tao Ruspoli
- Born: Mark Adam Wrathall; February 1, 1965 (age 61); Provo, Utah, U.S.

Education
- Education: University of California at Berkeley (PhD, 1996)
- Thesis: Unconcealment and Truth (1996)
- Doctoral advisor: Hubert Dreyfus
- Other advisors: Hans Sluga, Giovanni R. F. Ferrari

Philosophical work
- Era: Contemporary philosophy
- Region: Western philosophy
- School: Continental Philosophy
- Institutions: University of Oxford
- Website: www.markwrathall.org

Mark Adam Wrathall (/ˈræθɔːl/; born February 1, 1965) is an American philosopher who is professor of philosophy at the University of Oxford and a fellow and tutor at Corpus Christi College, Oxford. He is considered a leading interpreter of the philosophy of Martin Heidegger. Wrathall is featured in Tao Ruspoli's films Being in the World and Monogamish.

== Early life, education and career ==
Mark (Adam) Wrathall was born in Provo, Utah in 1965, and was raised in the towns of Greece and Pittsford in upstate New York. He spent his freshman year of high school at The Ridings High School in Winterbourne, England, and graduated from Pittsford Mendon High School in 1983. He received a BA in philosophy at Brigham Young University in 1988. In 1991, he received both a Juris Doctor from Harvard and an MA in philosophy from Boston College. After clerking for Cecil F. Poole at the U.S. Court of Appeals for the Ninth Circuit, he pursued a Ph.D. in philosophy from the University of California at Berkeley, where he was a student of the Heidegger scholar Hubert Dreyfus, graduating in 1996, with a disseration on “Unconcealment and Truth”.

From 1994 to 1996 he was a teaching fellow at Stanford Law School. Afterwards, he taught at Brigham Young University from 1996 to 2006 (first in the political science department, then from 1999 in the philosophy department); he then joined the University of California, Riverside, where he served as Associate Professor from 2007 to 2009 and Professor of Philosophy from 2009 to 2017. Since 2017, he has been a Fellow and Tutor in Philosophy at Corpus Christi College.

== Philosophical work ==
Wrathall's main interests include phenomenology, existentialism, the phenomenology of religion, and the philosophy of law, but he is best known for his work on Martin Heidegger.

Wrathall has also contributed to the philosophy of popular culture, editing a book on the philosophical themes found in the music of U2 and publishing essays on film and philosophy. Wrathall's work on popular culture intersects with his interests in religion. He draws on Heidegger, Kierkegaard, and Nietzsche to describe how secularism and technology undermine belief in objective eternal meanings and values. But Wrathall thinks nihilism also "opens up access to richer and more relevant ways for us to understand creation and for us to encounter the divine and the sacred."

According to a reviewer, "Wrathall's writing is clear and comprehensive, ranging across virtually all of Heidegger's collected works.... Wrathall's overall interpretation of Heidegger's work is crystal clear, compelling, and relevant."

== Personal life ==
Wrathall is a member of The Church of Jesus Christ of Latter Day Saints. He has contributed to an LDS journal, and in 2023 presented the Annual Latter-day Saint Lecture at McGill University.

== Books ==
- 2000 Heidegger, Coping and Cognitive Science (MIT Press) - editor with Jeff Malpas
- 2000 Heidegger, Authenticity and Modernity (MIT Press) - editor with Jeff Malpas
- 2000 Appropriating Heidegger (Cambridge University Press) - editor with James E. Faulconer
- 2002 Heidegger Reexamined (Routledge) - editor with Hubert Dreyfus
- 2003 Religion After Metaphysics (Cambridge University Press) - editor
- 2005 How to Read Heidegger (Granta; W. W. Norton)
- 2005 A Companion to Heidegger - editor with Hubert Dreyfus
- 2006 U2 and Philosophy (Open Court) - editor
- 2006 A Companion to Phenomenology and Existentialism - editor with Hubert Dreyfus
- 2008 U2 ea Filosofia (Madras) - editor
- 2009 Die Philosophie bei U2 (Wiley-VCH) - editor
- 2010 Heidegger and Unconcealment: Truth, Language, History (Cambridge University Press)
- 2013 The Cambridge Companion to Heidegger's Being and Time (Cambridge University Press) - editor
- 2020 Alma 30 - 63: a brief theological introduction (Maxwell Institute)
- 2020 The Cambridge Heidegger Lexicon (Cambridge University Press) - editor
