= Tao Ruspoli =

Italian and American filmmaker and actor (born 1975)

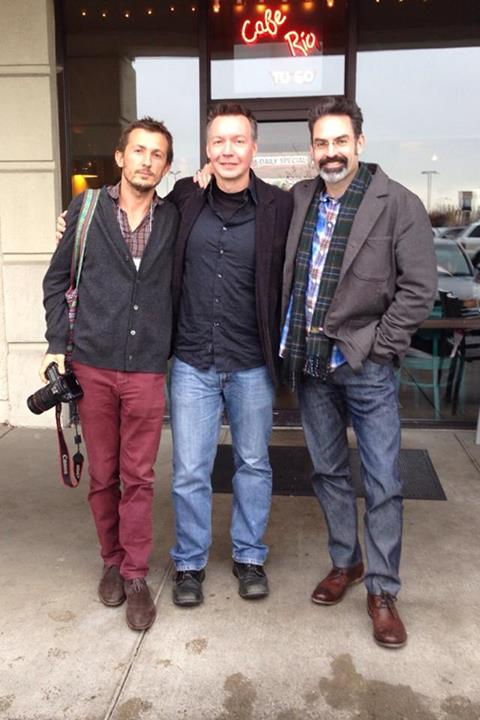
- Ruspoli (left) with Mark Wrathall and Iain Thomson in 2013
- Born: Tao dei Principi Ruspoli; 7 November 1975 (age 51); Bangkok, Thailand
- Citizenship: Italy; United States
- Occupations: Filmmaker; musician; photographer
- Spouse: Olivia Wilde (m. 2003; div. 2011)
- Parents: Alessandro Ruspoli, 9th Prince of Cerveteri (father); Debra Berger (mother)
- Relatives: Francesco Ruspoli, 10th Prince of Cerveteri (half-brother); Mélusine Ruspoli (half-sister)
- Website: taoruspoli.com

Tao dei Principi Ruspoli (/ˈrʊspoʊli/ RUU-spoh-lee; born 7 November 1975) is an Italian and American filmmaker, photographer, musician, and co-founder of The Bombay Beach Biennale.

== Early life ==
Ruspoli was born in Bangkok, Thailand, and raised in Rome, Italy and Los Angeles, California, United States. He is the second son of occasional actor and aristocrat Alessandro Ruspoli, 9th Prince of Cerveteri and Austrian-American actress Debra Berger.

Ruspoli graduated from Beverly Hills High School in 1993, and later from the University of California, Berkeley in 1998 with a degree in philosophy.

== Personal life ==
Ruspoli married actress Olivia Wilde on 16 January 2003 in Venice, California. On 8 February 2011, they announced that they were separating. Wilde filed for divorce in Los Angeles County Superior Court on 3 March 2011, citing "irreconcilable differences". The divorce was finalized on 29 September 2011. Wilde did not seek spousal support, and the pair reached a private agreement on property division.

Since 2009, he has lived and worked in Venice, Los Angeles, as a photographer and filmmaker.

== Filmography ==
- Just Say Know (2002) Director, Cinematographer and Film editor
- This Film Needs No Title: A Portrait of Raymond Smullyan (2004) Director, Cinematographer and Film editor
- El Cable (2004) Director, Cinematographer, Editor and Film producer
- Flamenco: A Personal Journey (2005) Director, Cinematographer and Film producer
- Camjackers (2006) Whack Filmmaker No. 1 and also Film editor and Executive Producer
- Fix (2008) Writer, Cinematographer, director, and Actor (as Milo)
- Behind the Wheel (film)|Behind the Wheel (2008) Film director
- Being in the World (2009) Film director
- American Casino (2009) Film producer
- Monogamish (2017) Film director
- Dying to Know: Ram Dass & Timothy Leary (2014), Film producer

== Recordings ==
- Flamenco, (Mapleshade, 2005)
