= Hans Friedrich Fulda =

German philosopher

- Born: 2 August 1930; Stuttgart, Free People's State of Württemberg, Weimar Germany
- Died: 24 August 2023 (aged 93); Berlin, Germany
- Spouse: Brigitte Falkenburg

Education
- Education: Heidelberg University (PhD, Dr. phil. hab.); Goethe University Frankfurt (attended)
- Theses: Das Problem einer Einleitung in Hegels Wissenschaft der Logik (1961); Der logische Pragmatismus von Charles Sanders Peirce. I. Teil: Theoretisches und praktisches Verhalten (1969)
- Doctoral advisor: Hans-Georg Gadamer (PhD advisor); Dieter Henrich (Dr. phil. hab. advisor)

Philosophical work
- Era: Contemporary philosophy
- Region: Western philosophy
- School: Hegelianism
- Institutions: Free University of Berlin; Bielefeld University; Heidelberg University
- Main interests: Metaphysics, practical philosophy

Hans Friedrich Fulda (2 August 1930 – 24 August 2023) was a German philosopher. He was a full professor at Bielefeld University, then a full professor at Heidelberg University, where he became professor emeritus in 1995.

== Life ==
From 1950, Fulda studied at the Heidelberg University and Goethe University Frankfurt. He received his doctorate on Hegel's Science of Logic, and the Phenomenology of Spirit as its introduction. After completing his doctorate at Heidelberg in February 1961, he was a research assistant at the Free University of Berlin from 1960 and in Heidelberg from 1965. After his habilitation at Heidelberg in July 1969, he became a full professor at Bielefeld University in September 1974. In October 1981, he became chair of philosophy (Ordinarius) at Heidelberg, thereby succeeding Michael Theunissen, and thus Hans-Georg Gadamer as well. He became emeritus in September 1995.

His research areas were German idealism (Kant, Hegel), metaphysics and practical philosophy. The Heidelberg index of his digital texts lists more than one hundred books and essays.

From 1987 to 1996, he was President of the Internationale Hegel-Vereinigung, succeeding Dieter Henrich, who had in turn succeeded the Vereinigung's founder, Hans-Georg Gadamer. During his presidency of the Vereinigung, the prestigious Hegel Prize of the City of Stuttgart was awarded to Niklas Luhmann, Donald Davidson and Jacques Le Goff.

== Philosophy ==
He argued with Michael Theunissen about Hegel's logic as a universal theory of communication, meticulously engaging with his opponents; he rejected the "inversion" of Hegel by Marxism, he reconstructed Friedrich Jacobi's critique of materialist Enlightenment.

== Selected writings ==
- "Das Problem einer Einleitung in Hegels Wissenschaft der Logik", Philosophische Abhandlungen (Dissertation von 1964), vol. 27 (2 ed.), Frankfurt am Main: Klostermann, 1975 [1965], OCLC 813643787
- Hegel-Studien, Beiheft (1966), Gadamer, Hans-Georg (ed.), "Zur Logik der Phänomenologie von 1807", Beiträge zur Deutung der Phänomenologie des Geistes. Hegel-Tage Royaumont 1964, vol. 3, Bonn: Bouvier, pp. 75–101
- Das Recht der Philosophie in Hegels Philosophie des Rechts, Frankfurt am Main: Klostermann, 1968, OCLC 610817038
- mit Dieter Henrich, ed. (1992) [1973], Materialien zu Hegels Phänomenologie des Geistes (8 ed.), Frankfurt am Main: Suhrkamp, ISBN 978-3-518-27609-9
- mit Rolf-Peter Horstmann und Michael Theunissen: Kritische Darstellung der Metaphysik. Eine Diskussion über Hegels Logik. Suhrkamp, Frankfurt am Main 1980, ISBN 3-518-07915-8.
- Georg Wilhelm Friedrich Hegel (1770–1831) (PDF), München: Beck, 2003 [1981], ISBN 978-3-406-49445-1
- "Vernunft diesseits von Zwecken und Mitteln", Konzepte der Rationalität / Concepts of Rationality, Berlin / New York: De Gruyter, pp. 43–56, 2008
- "Vom "sich vollbringenden Skeptizismus" zur "eigentlichen Metaphysik". Das Ende einer Darstellung erscheinenden Wissens und der Anfang von Hegels Wissenschaft der Logik"", Skeptizismus und Metaphysik, HRSGG. Von Markus Gabriel, Berlin / Boston: Akademie Verlag, pp. 317–352, 2012
- Cornelia Ortlieb, Friedrich Vollhardt, ed. (2021), "Friedrich Heinrich Jacobis Kritik an der materialistischen Aufklärung. Eine Fallstudie zur Aufklärungsforschung", Friedrich Heinrich Jacobi (1743–1819): Romancier – Philosoph – Politiker, Berlin / Boston: De Gruyter, pp. 85–104
- Spekulative Logik als "die eigentliche Metaphysik". Zu Hegels Verwandlung des neuzeitlichen Metaphysikverständnisses (1991).
- Begriff und Begründung der Menschenrechte. Im Ausgang von Kant, hrsg. von Brigitte Falkenburg. Klostermann, Frankfurt 2024, ISBN 978-3-465-04648-6.
