= Historical consciousness =

Mode of relating to the past, present and future

Historical consciousness refers to the awareness and interpretation of history as a dimension of human experience, involving the perception of temporal continuity, change, and the contextualization of present events within the past. It is a central concept in historical theory, philosophy of history, historiography, education, and is often associated with the ways individuals and societies understand their place in historical time.

== Etymology and conceptual origins ==
Scholars often trace the emergence of historical consciousness to a specifically Western synthesis of religious and classical legacies. As a disposition, it coalesces where biblical traditions supplied a sense of meaning, structure, and teleological movement linking past, present, and future, while Greek inquiry modeled critical, evidence-based discrimination between history and myth. At earlier cultural stages, by contrast, consciousness of time often appeared cyclical, organizing human experience around recurring natural rhythms rather than linear development.

The written expression of historical consciousness (German: Geschichtsbewusstsein) as a recognized concept gained academic currency in 19th-century German historicism, especially through the works of philosophers like Johann Gustav Droysen and via the writing of historian Leopold von Ranke. Correspondingly, Droysen called history and historical consciousness "humanity’s knowledge of itself." Both Droysen and von Ranke looked at historical consciousness or history more simply, as a story about life as it related to political states, making it as much a geocentric concept as an anthropomorphic one. It was later refined by theorists such as German philosopher Hans-Georg Gadamer, who linked historical consciousness to hermeneutics and narrative structures in history.

Historical consciousness cannot be disentangled from the continuum of historical thought itself, which encompasses the formulation of recognizable meaning in events, the role of distinctive cultural phenomena, the contextualization of identities—whether linguistic, religious, political, or other socially constructed—and how such variables influence interpretation. Historical thought is part of the human effort to find meaning in lived experience by balancing verifiable evidence with interpretive understanding. Through interdisciplinary methods and a universal perspective, it aims to transcend narrow narratives, grounding past events in broader patterns while respecting the complexity and diversity of human lives.

=== Historiographical development ===
Modern historiographers, such as the late Ernst Breisach, have treated historical consciousness not merely as awareness of the past, but as a structured relationship between past, present, and future that shapes how individuals and societies situate themselves in time. Historical reflection has served diverse purposes, including providing moral instruction, legitimizing political authority, satisfying intellectual curiosity, and, in modern contexts, functioning as a scientific discipline in its own right. Breisach emphasizes that historical reflection emerges from the fundamental human condition of temporal continuity, observing that "human life is never simply lived in the present alone but rather in three worlds: one that is, one that was, and one that will be," and that reflection on the past is "never isolated from the present and the future." Historical consciousness thus constitutes a broader interpretive framework through which continuity and change are reconciled, as historians have long "designed the great reconciliations between past, present, and future," rendering temporal transformation intelligible within a meaningful continuum.

The form and intensity of historical consciousness have varied considerably across historical contexts. In archaic Greek epics, for example, the past functioned primarily as an exemplar rather than as a domain of causal explanation; heroic narratives were intended to inspire rather than to analyze historical development. Only gradually did Greeks begin to conceptualize the past as part of a continuous temporal process with discernible direction and meaning. Hesiod's formulation of successive ages introduced the notion that human history possessed both continuity and trajectory, establishing an interpretive model through which later societies could situate themselves within a broader historical sequence.

Historical consciousness often intensified during periods of perceived rupture, when continuity with the past appeared threatened. Breisach notes that Romans of the late Republic became acutely aware that their present circumstances differed fundamentally from those of their ancestors, particularly amid the political crises of the first century BCE. This perceived disruption of tradition prompted renewed efforts to interpret and preserve Rome's historical legacy. In this context, history increasingly emerged as a scholarly enterprise, and figures such as Cicero encouraged Roman historians to emulate Greek models by providing systematic accounts of past events, motives, and causes. The classical formulation of this exemplary function—historia magistra vitae (history as the teacher of life), a topos Koselleck traces from Cicero through the early modern period—presupposed a constancy of human nature and circumstance sufficient to make the past's lessons repeatable; it was precisely this presupposition that modernity dissolved as the widening gap between experience and expectation rendered the past structurally inapplicable to an unprecedented future.

== Core dimensions ==
Historical consciousness is not merely knowledge of historical facts but involves several layers of intellectual complexity; these are:

- Temporal orientation: Awareness of past, present, and future as connected.
- Narrative construction: Framing past events in coherent, meaningful stories.
- Moral and political judgment: Deriving ethical or civic lessons from historical experience.
- Identity formation: Using history to shape individual or collective identity.

To this end, German historian Jörn Rüsen identified four types of historical consciousness: traditional (continuity-focused), exemplary (lesson-oriented), critical (tradition-negating), and genetic (developmental and contextual). Interdisciplinary historians Anna Clark and Carla Peck write that "theorizations about the dimensions and potential of historical consciousness—pedagogically, psychologically, and disciplinarily—continue to shape discussion of the term and its applications."

== Development in thought ==
=== Historicism and hermeneutics ===
From the late medieval and early modern periods to the nineteenth century, historical consciousness was reshaped by a gradual secularization of explanation and method. Historians increasingly bracketed appeals to providence, concentrating instead on what could be verified through source criticism, context-sensitive interpretation, and methodological rigor. Renaissance philology—epitomized by Lorenzo Valla's demonstration of the Donation of Constantine as a forgery—became a touchstone for later historical method and contributed to a more "scientific" outlook on the past.

By the 19th century, proponents of historicism emphasized that all human understanding was historically situated. Thinkers like Wilhelm Dilthey argued that consciousness itself is embedded within a historical context. Dilthey's preoccupation with this theme revealed itself by his own admission, as on the occasion of his seventieth birthday he claimed his very life's work had been a study of "the nature and conditions of historical consciousness."

Hans-Georg Gadamer's Truth and Method (1960) advanced the notion that understanding is always interpretive and historically conditioned. He argued that history is not an object of knowledge detached from the present, but a medium through which we understand ourselves. He called this phenomenon one's "historically-effected consciousness," (wirkungsgeschichtliches Bewußtsein) a term that means perception and interpretation is always shaped by a combination of one's lived experiences, culture, language, socio-political milieu, and the time period during which one lived. Gadamer's account of historically-effected consciousness and his thoughts on hermeneutics would prove formative for German historian Reinhart Koselleck's own development of the categories of horizon of expectation and space of experience.

Koselleck extended the historicist analysis of temporal consciousness through the conceptual pair he termed the Erfahrungsraum (space of experience) and the Erwartungshorizont (horizon of expectation). Experience, in his account, is present past—events incorporated and available to memory—while expectation names the present's projection toward an open, not-yet-experienced future. The decisive feature of modernity, for Koselleck, is that the tension between these two categories widens into a structural asymmetry: as the pace of change accelerates, the horizon of expectation becomes progressively dislodged from the accumulated space of experience, and the past's lessons cease to be applicable to an unprecedented future. He distilled this inversion into a formula: the lesser the accumulated experience, the greater the expectations projected onto the future—a reversal that defines the specifically modern form of historical consciousness. Progress and historical consciousness thus "reciprocally temporalize all histories into the singularity of the world-historical process," collapsing the older plurality of exemplary histories into a single, forward-moving, open-ended Geschichte (history).

Dutch historian Theo Jung further expounded Koselleck's experience-expectation framework by arguing that Gadamer's account of experience is inherently negative—formed through the rupture of expectation rather than its mere confirmation—and that this negative structure applies symmetrically to anticipation, such that a society's historical consciousness extends forward into still-unrealized futures as well as backward into remembered pasts. On this basis, Jung distinguishes three modes of anticipating future events: the un-reflective assumption of the routine event, the consciously prepared-for expectation of the relative event, and the adumbration of the radical event, which stands outside any meaningful relation to prior experience altogether.

=== Relation to memory and identity ===
Contemporary discussions commonly connect historical consciousness with collective memory. Marie-Claire Lavabre identifies three influential approaches: (1) "Realms of memory" (lieux de mémoire, Pierre Nora), foregrounding symbolic sites where the past is mobilized for identity; (2) "Working-through of remembering" (Paul Ricoeur), emphasizing ethical and psychosocial processes of confronting difficult pasts; and (3) "Frameworks of memory" (Maurice Halbwachs), analyzing the social conditions of remembering. Together these show how historical consciousness is entwined with identity formation, public commemoration, and the political uses of the past.

=== Modern historical theory ===
In recent decades, theorists like Jörn Rüsen and Peter Seixas have examined historical consciousness as a cultural and educational phenomenon. Rüsen emphasizes the narrative logic of historical thinking, while Seixas explores its role in shaping civic understanding in pluralistic societies. Social scientist Paul Zanazanian conceives of historical consciousness as the lived expression of our evolving relationship with the past, where we employ both history-as-interpretive-filter and history-as-content-configuration in making sense of our lives. He argues that it shapes how we position ourselves and uphold our integrity and dignity in the face of life’s challenges. In Zanazanian's view, history serves as a background framework for making sense of experience—an embodied source of knowledge that helps us navigate disruptions and find meaning as well as coherence amid life's uncertainties.

Modern historiographers have to this end further expanded the concept of historical consciousness by emphasizing its collective and socially constructed character. Breisach distinguished between formal interpretive theories produced by historians and the broader "sense of history" embedded within societies themselves, noting that this collective historical awareness is continually reshaped through social experience. Twentieth-century historiographical developments, including the concept of mentalité, identify the shared conceptual horizons that define how particular societies understand their historical position and temporal identity. These developments reflect a broader shift toward recognizing historical consciousness as both a product of historical conditions and an active force shaping historical interpretation itself.

== In historical education ==
Historical consciousness has become a central framework in history education, particularly in Canada, Germany, and Scandinavia. Curricula increasingly focus on teaching students to "think historically" rather than memorize facts, emphasizing historical empathy, causation, and narrative construction. The concept's currency in Anglo-Saxon education discourse was itself a gradual development: as late as the mid-1980s it remained largely unrecognized outside the German idealistic-phenomenological tradition, with "historical literacy" and "historical awareness" serving as functional substitutes in North American and British pedagogy respectively before the concept achieved broader adoption.

== Controversies and critiques ==
Critics like Michel de Certeau and Hayden White have argued that historical narratives necessarily encode ideological agendas through their very structure—that emplotment, rhetorical form, and narrative closure are not neutral containers for historical content but active shapers of its meaning and political valence. Then there is the matter of whether universalizing models of historical consciousness overlook non-Western modes of temporal understanding. This was certainly the case for historian John Lukacs, who once quipped that historical consciousness was something specifically "Western". Researchers Maria Grever and Robbert-Jan Adriaansen write that "one of the main reasons for historical consciousness perpetuating a Western bias is its treatment as a mere cognitive epistemological category in history education practices and research."

A modern critique about historical consciousness being more than just a western phenomenon is discernible in the writing of public historian, Na Li, who has written about China's deliberate effort to provide massive funding for the "proliferation of museums, re-vamped historical sites, memorials and monuments, historic districts and cities"; all of which indicates "an increasing occupation with the past." Li adds that:

'The Chinese and Their Pasts' project assumes the connection between historical consciousness and collective memory and focuses on understanding the historical consciousness of ordinary Chinese through different genres; more precisely, it explores how 'historical consciousness' is related to historical understanding, experience, memories, imagination, and the market-oriented quest for the past. As the Chinese generally still claim pride in their ancient origin and long history, this project also sheds light on historical consciousness at the national level where collective memory morphs into national memory, and historical consciousness into national consciousness.

=== Terminology and scope ===
To avoid conflating the past itself with accounts of the past, some philosophers distinguish history (past events and processes) from historiography (the writing about those events). They further separate the philosophy of historiography—which examines evidence, explanation, objectivity, and epistemic justification in historical practice—from the philosophy of history, which asks metaphysical questions about direction, contingency, and necessity in the past. However, the analytic distinction between history as past reality and historiography as its subsequent representation presupposes an ontological independence that modern historiographical scholars like Daniel Little have called into question. He argued that hermeneutic and conceptual-historical traditions instead emphasize that historical knowledge emerges only through interpretive reconstruction and that correspondingly, historical information does "not speak" for itself, but demands that the historian "interpret individual pieces of evidence" in order to construct a coherent account of the past. Likewise, hermeneutic approaches—from the likes of Heidegger, Gadamer, Ricœur, and Foucault—insist that "historical knowledge depends upon interpretation of meaningful human actions and practices," underscoring that historical intelligibility is inseparable from the interpretive frameworks through which it is apprehended.

Conceptual historians like Koselleck argue that historical reality itself is mediated through historically contingent categories of understanding and that historical concepts do not merely describe the past inasmuch as they condition its intelligibility, since "in order to represent history it is necessary to make use of a vocabulary that distinguishes the things we need to talk about." Consequently, historical consciousness is not a passive reflection of prior events but an active process of conceptual and narrative construction. This epistemological condition collapses any rigid separation between the philosophy of historiography and the philosophy of history, because inquiry into the past yields questions about what the past itself is. Historical knowledge and historical reality are therefore inseparable at the level of intelligibility, joined through the interpretive activity that renders the past meaningful in the present. To this end, the prevailing perspective is that "human consciousness is itself a historical product, and that it is an important part of the historian’s work to piece together the mentality and assumptions of actors in the past."

== Bibliography ==
- Ahonen, Sirkka (2005). "Historical Consciousness: A Viable Paradigm for History Education?". Journal of Curriculum Studies. 37 (6): 697–707. doi:10.1080/00220270500158681.
- Breisach, Ernst (1994). Historiography: Ancient, Medieval, and Modern. Chicago and London: The University of Chicago Press. ISBN 0-226-07278-9.
- Clark, Anna; Peck, Carla L. (2018). "Introduction—Historical Consciousness: Theory and Practice". In Anna Clark; Carla L. Peck; Anna Green (eds.). Contemplating Historical Consciousness: Notes from the Field. Oxford and New York: Berghahn Books. ISBN 978-1-78533-929-5.
- Clark, Elizabeth A. (2004). History, Theory, Text: Historians and the Linguistic Turn. Cambridge and London: Harvard University Press. ISBN 0-674-01516-9.
- Dilthey, Wilhelm (1961). Pattern and Meaning in History. New York: Harper Torchbooks. ISBN 978-0-06131-969-5.
- Gadamer, Hans-Georg (2013). Truth and Method (2nd ed.). London and New York: Bloomsbury. ISBN 978-1-78093-624-6.
- Gilderhus, Mark T. (2003). History and Historians: A Historiographical Introduction (5th ed.). Upper Saddle River, NJ: Pearson/Prentice Hall. ISBN 0-13-044824-9.
- Grever, Maria; Adriaansen, Robbert-Jan (2019). "Historical Consciousness: The Enigma of Different Paradigms". Journal of Curriculum Studies. 51 (6): 814–830. doi:10.1080/00220272.2019.1652937. hdl:1765/121016.
- Jung, Theo (2021). "Events Getting Ahead of Themselves: Rethinking the Temporality of Expectations". History and Theory. 60 (2): 192–214. doi:10.1111/hith.12196.
- Koselleck, Reinhart (2004). Futures Past: On the Semantics of Historical Time. Translated by Keith Tribe. New York: Columbia University Press. ISBN 0-231-12771-5.
- Kramer, Lloyd; Maza, Sarah A. (2002). "Introduction: The Cultural History of Historical Thought". In Lloyd Kramer; Sarah A. Maza (eds.). A Companion to Western Historical Thought. Malden, MA: Blackwell Publishing. pp. 1–12. ISBN 978-0-63121-714-5.
- Lavabre, Marie-Claire (2009). "Historiography and Memory". In Tucker, Aviezer (ed.). A Companion to the Philosophy of History and Historiography. Chichester and Malden, MA: Wiley-Blackwell. pp. 362–369. ISBN 978-1-40514-908-2.
- Lee, Peter (2004). "Understanding History". In Peter Seixas (ed.). Theorizing Historical Consciousness. Toronto: University of Toronto Press. ISBN 978-1-44268-261-0.
- Li, Na (2018). "Chinese and their Pasts: Exploring Historical Consciousness of Ordinary Chinese—Initial Findings from Chongqing". In Anna Clark; Carla L. Peck; Anna Green (eds.). Contemplating Historical Consciousness: Notes from the Field. Oxford and New York: Berghahn Books. ISBN 978-1-78533-929-5.
- Little, Daniel (2025). "Philosophy of History". In Zalta, Edward N.; Nodelman, Uri (eds.). Stanford Encyclopedia of Philosophy.
- Lukacs, John (2017). Historical Consciousness: The Remembered Past. London and New York: Routledge. ISBN 978-1-56000-732-6.
- Nora, Pierre (1989). "Between Memory and History: Les Lieux de Mémoire". Representations. 26: 7–24. doi:10.2307/2928520.
- Nordgren, Kenneth (2019). "Boundaries of Historical Consciousness: A Western Cultural Achievement or an Anthropological Universal?". Journal of Curriculum Studies. 51 (6): 779–797. doi:10.1080/00220272.2019.1652938.
- Olsen, Niklas (2012). History in the Plural: An Introduction to the Work of Reinhart Koselleck. New York: Berghahn Books. ISBN 978-0-85745-295-5.
- Rüsen, Jörn (1987). "Historical Narration: Foundation, Types, Reason". History and Theory. 26 (Beiheft 26): 87–97. doi:10.2307/2505064.
- Rüsen, Jörn (1994). Historische Orientierung: Über die Arbeit des Geschichtsbewusstseins, sich in der Zeit zurechtzufinden (in German). Köln: Böhlau. ISBN 978-3-41209-492-8.
- Rüsen, Jörn (2020). "A Turning Point in Theory of History: The Place of Hayden White in the History of Metahistory". History and Theory. 59 (1): 1–13. doi:10.1111/hith.12147.
- Seixas, Peter (2004). Theorizing Historical Consciousness. Toronto: University of Toronto Press. ISBN 978-1-44268-261-0.
- Tucker, Aviezer (2009). "Introduction". A Companion to the Philosophy of History and Historiography. Chichester and Malden, MA: Wiley-Blackwell. pp. 1–6. ISBN 978-1-40514-908-2.
- White, Hayden (1973). Metahistory: The Historical Imagination in Nineteenth-Century Europe. Baltimore: Johns Hopkins University Press. ISBN 978-0-80181-761-8.
- White, Hayden (1990). The Content of the Form: Narrative Discourse and Historical Representation. Baltimore: Johns Hopkins University Press. ISBN 978-0-80184-115-6.
- Zanazanian, Paul (2025). Historical Consciousness and Practical Life: A Theory and Methodology. Toronto: University of Toronto Press. ISBN 978-1-48751-888-2.

=== Further reading ===
- Droysen, Johann Gustav (1893). Outline of the Principles of History. Boston: Ginn and Company. ISBN 978-1-34082-494-4.
- Ranke, Leopold von (1887). History of the Latin and Teutonic Nations. Oxford: Clarendon Press. ISBN 978-1-40862-736-2.
