= Hans-Georg Gadamer: A Biography =

1999 book by Jean Grondin

- Author: Jean Grondin
- Original title: Hans-Georg Gadamer. Eine Biographie
- Translator: Joel Weinsheimer
- Language: German
- Subject: Hans-Georg Gadamer
- Publisher: Mohr Siebeck
- Publication date: 1999
- Publication place: Germany
- English publication date: 2003
- Pages: 437
- ISBN: 3161468554

Hans-Georg Gadamer: A Biography (German: Hans-Georg Gadamer. Eine Biographie) is a biography about the German philosopher Hans-Georg Gadamer. It was written by the Canadian philosopher Jean Grondin and first published in German by Mohr Siebeck in 1999. Yale University Press published the English translation by Joel Weinsheimer in 2003.
