= Manfred Frank =

German philosopher (born 1945)

- Born: 22 March 1945 (age 81); Elberfeld, Germany

Education
- Education: University of Heidelberg (PhD, 1971)
- Thesis: Das Problem "Zeit" in der deutschen Romantik: Zeitbewußtsein und Bewußtsein von Zeitlichkeit in der frühromantischen Philosophie und in Tiecks Dichtung (1971)
- Doctoral advisor: Dieter Henrich

Philosophical work
- Era: Contemporary philosophy
- Region: Western philosophy
- School: Continental philosophy Heidelberg school of philosophy of subjectivity
- Institutions: University of Düsseldorf; University of Geneva; University of Tübingen
- Main interests: Philosophy of subjectivity and self-consciousness, history of philosophy, philosophy of literature
- Notable ideas: Criticism of poststructuralism

Manfred Frank (born March 22, 1945) is a German philosopher who is emeritus professor of philosophy at the University of Tübingen.

== Life and work ==
Frank was born in Elberfeld, Germany, and studied philosophy at the University of Heidelberg under teachers such as Hans-Georg Gadamer, Karl Löwith, Ernst Tugendhat, and Dieter Henrich. After teaching at the University of Düsseldorf from 1971 to 1982, and at the University of Geneva from 1982 to 1987, Frank accepted a position at Tübingen in 1987. He is a specialist in the philosophy of literature.

Frank's work focuses on German idealism, Romanticism, and the concepts of subjectivity and self-consciousness. His 950-page study of German Romanticism, Unendliche Annäherung (Infinite Approximation), has been described as "the most comprehensive and thoroughgoing study of early German romanticism" and "surely one of the most important books from the post-War period on the history of German philosophy." He has also written at length on analytic philosophy and recent French philosophy.

== Selected works ==
=== Books ===
==== In English ====
- Frank, Manfred (2012-02-01). The Philosophical Foundations of Early German Romanticism. Translated by Millán-Zaibert, Elizabeth. State University of New York Press. doi:10.2307/jj.18253912. ISBN 978-0-7914-8580-4. (This is a translation of the last 12 lectures from "Unendliche Annäherung". Die Anfänge der philosophischen Frühromantik. Frankfurt a. M.: Suhrkamp, 1997.)
- Frank, Manfred (1997). The Subject and the Text: Essays on Literary Theory and Philosophy. Cambridge University Press. ISBN 978-0-521-56121-1.
- Frank, Manfred (1989). What is neostructuralism?. Minneapolis: University of Minnesota Press. ISBN 978-0-8166-1599-5 – via Internet Archive.

==== In German ====
- Das Problem "Zeit" in der deutschen Romantik; Zeitbewusstsein und Bewusstsein von Zeitlichkeit in der frühromantischen Philosophie und in Tiecks Dichtung. Paderborn: Winkler Verlag, 1972, 1990. ISBN 978-3-538-07804-8
- Einführung in die frühromantische Ästhetik. Vorlesungen. Frankfurt a. M.: Suhrkamp, 1989.
- Selbstbewußtsein und Selbsterkenntnis: Essays zur analytischen Philosophie der Subjektivität. Stuttgart: Reclam, 1991.
- "Unendliche Annäherung". Die Anfänge der philosophischen Frühromantik. Frankfurt a. M.: Suhrkamp, 1997.
- Auswege aus dem deutschen Idealismus. Frankfurt a. M.: Suhrkamp, 2007.
- Die Unhintergehbarkeit von Individualität. Reflexionen über Subjekt, Person und Individuum aus Anlaß ihrer "postmodernen" Toterklärung. Frankfurt a. M.: Suhrkamp, 1986. ISBN 978-3-518-11377-6

==== In French ====
- L'ultime raison du sujet. Arles, France: Actes Sud, 1988. ISBN 2-86869-204-4

==== In Italian ====
- Natura e Spirito – Lezioni sulla filosofia di Schelling, a cura di Emilio Carlo Corriero, Torino, Rosenberg & Sellier, 2010.

=== Articles ===
- "The World as Will and Representation: Deleuze's and Guattari's Critique of Capitalism as Schizo-Analysis and Schizo-Discourse". Telos 57 (Fall 1983). New York: Telos Press.
- Manfred, Frank. "Non-objectal Subjectivity". ingentaconnect.com. Archived from the original on 2024-09-11.
- "Qu’est-ce qu’un texte littéraire et que signifie sa compréhension?", in Revue Internationale de Philosophie, vol. 41, nº 162/163 (3-4), « Philosophie de la Littérature », 1987, p. 378-397. Partial translation of an article originally published in German. (Read online).
