= Liselotte Richter =

German theologian (1906–1968)

Liselotte Richter (7 June 1906 – 16 January 1968) was a German philosopher and theologian. She was the first female professor of philosophy in Germany.

== Early life ==
Luise Charlotte Richter was born in 1906 and grew up with her twin brother Fritz in a middle-class family, first in Berlin-Tegel and then in Charlottenburg.

She began studying philosophy at the Friedrich-Wilhelms-Universität in Berlin in 1926. She moved to the Philipps University of Marburg to hear lectures there by Martin Heidegger, following him to the Albert Ludwig University of Freiburg in 1928. She later returned to Marburg, where she attained her doctorate with distinction in 1932, supervised by the philosopher Erich Frank (1883–1949). Her thesis was entitled "Subjectivity in Kierkegaard. A Paper on the Christian Account of Existence".

Richter's interest was in new approaches to existential philosophy. A note from her first year of study, "When the soul speaks, the sole reign of the callous intellect ceases!" (Wenzel 1999, 42), encapsulates her occupation with existential questions and her search for a connection between subjectivity and the "venture of faith".

In 1932, Richter also passed the examination to qualify as a teacher at secondary schools for girls. While still in Marburg, she became involved in the KPD (Communist Party of Germany), which led to her arrest in 1933 shortly after the Nazis had seized power. She then moved back to Berlin.

== Academic activity ==
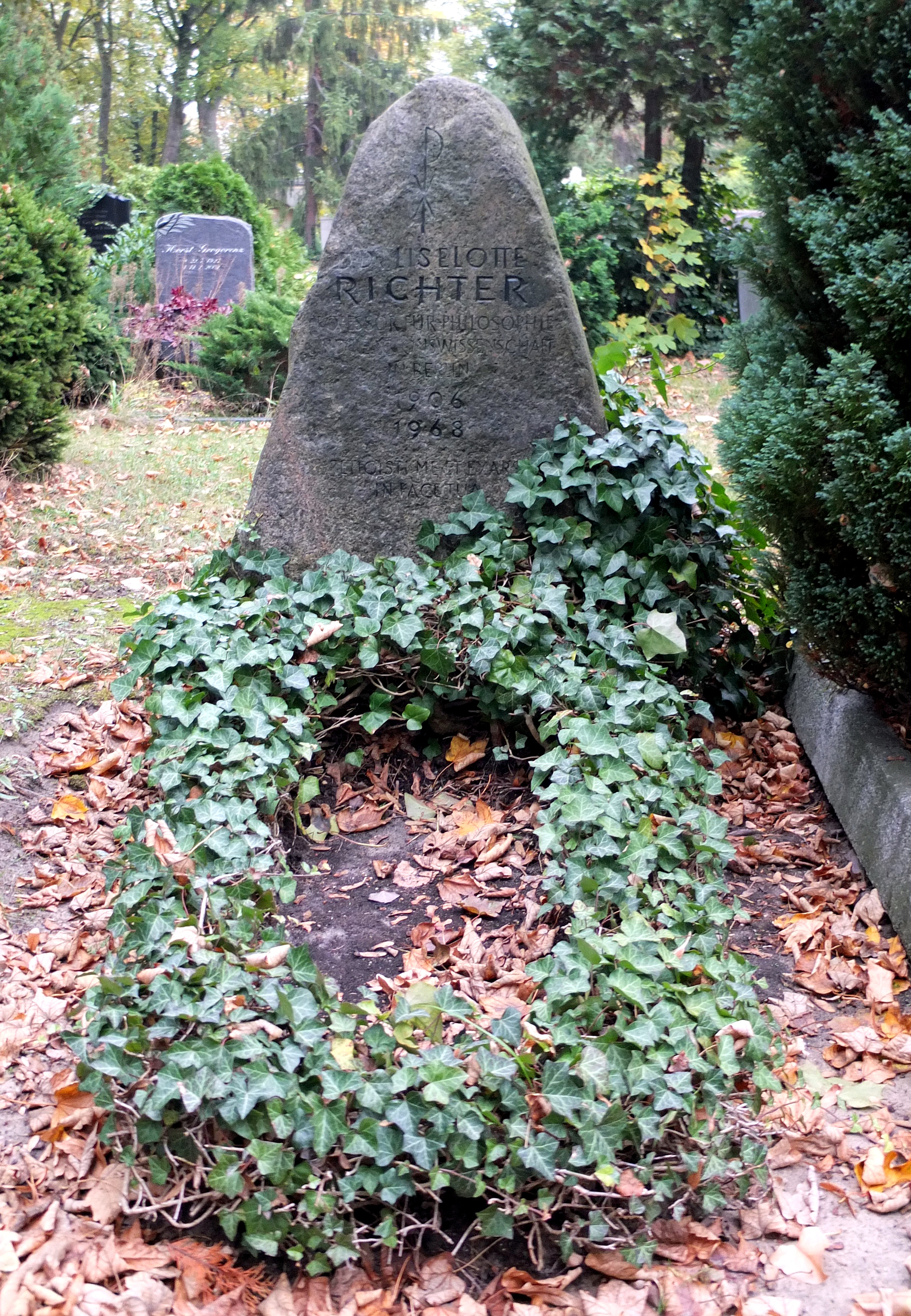
Grave of Liselotte Richter

After almost three years of unemployment, Richter was given an assistant position at the Prussian Academy of Sciences and worked on its Leibniz edition (correspondence), which she continued to do during the Nazi regime. She was also active as a caregiver for the German Red Cross from 1943 to 1945. She began publishing at this time and in 1943, she took up a position at the Deutsche Studentenschaft (German Student Union).

After the Second World War, Richter took over the build-up and management of the Charlottenburg Volkshochschule and was also appointed district councillor for adult education. That same year, she enrolled to habilitate (qualify to hold professorial positions) at the Faculty of Philosophy of the University of Berlin and she was appointed professor with full teaching remit, becoming the first female professor of philosophy in Germany.

In 1946, six women at the University of Berlin became professors (out of a total of 300 professors). They were Richter, geneticist Elisabeth Schiemann, Slavic languages expert Margarete Woltner and medical professors Auguste Hoffmann, Elisabeth Nau, and Dean Else Knake. Between 1948 and 1951, all but one were compelled to leave the university because of political circumstances; only Richter retained her professorship until her retirement.

Richter became a member of the SED (Socialist Unity Party of Germany), which quickly tried to influence university politics. She left the SED in 1948 and increasingly found herself clashing with the university leadership and her colleagues and the Marxism-Leninism they represented.

As part of the academic restructuring of philosophy (The 2nd University Reform 1950/51) in the German Democratic Republic, Richter was forced out of the philosophy department in 1951 and reassigned to the department of theology under the guise of a promotion. She received a professorship with a chair in the philosophy of religion—the first female academic in Germany to do so. Her chair belonged to the subdivision of systematic theology in the faculty of theology. She lectured on the history of philosophy and devoted herself to research on the philosophy of religion.

In 1965, she received an honorary doctorate from the faculty of theology for her dedicated teaching. Her work reflected a variety of interests. In addition to Søren Kierkegaard, she also published on René Descartes, Jakob Böhme, Gottfried Wilhelm Leibniz, Moses Mendelssohn, Angelus Silesius, Rainer Maria Rilke, Karl Jaspers, Albert Camus, Jean-Paul Sartre, and Mahatma Gandhi.

She commuted between her place of residence in West Berlin (Charlottenburg) and the Humboldt University in East Berlin, and even continued teaching after the Berlin Wall had gone up. After several strokes, she died on 16 January 1968 and was buried at the Luisenfriedhof II in Berlin-Westend. Her grave is dedicated as a grave of honour of the city of Berlin.

== Legacy ==
On 7 June 2006, the faculty of theology of the Humboldt University in Berlin honoured Richter's 100th birthday. Richard Schröder, Catherina Wenzel, and Michael Weichenhan edited the memorial volume "Nach jedem Sonnenuntergange bin ich verwundet und verwaist." Liselotte Richter zum 100. Geburtstag.

From 2007 to 2013, the Leibniz-Edition Potsdam of the Berlin-Brandenburg Academy of Sciences and Humanities awarded the Liselotte Richter Prize, which was endowed with 1,000 euros, to upper secondary school students in Berlin and Brandenburg.

== Selected publications ==
=== Monographs ===
- Der Begriff der Subjektivität bei Kierkegaard. Ein Beitrag zur christlichen Existenzdarstellung. Triltsch, Würzburg 1934 (at the same time: Marburg Univ. Diss.)
- Immanenz und Transzendenz im nachreformatorischen Gottesbild. Vandenhoeck & Ruprecht, Göttingen 1955
- Jakob Böhme. Mystische Schau. (Geistiges Europa). Hoffmann & Campe, Hamburg 1947
- Jean-Paul Sartre. (Köpfe des XX. Jahrhunderts; 23). Colloquium-Verlag, Berlin 1964
- Leibniz und sein Rußlandbild. Akademie-Verlag, Berlin 1949
- Mahatma Gandhi. (Köpfe des XX. Jahrhunderts; 25). Colloquium-Verlag, Berlin 1962
- Philosophie der Dichtkunst. Moses Mendelssohns Ästhetik zwischen Aufklärung und Sturm und Drang. Chronos-Verlag, Berlin 1948
- René Descartes. Dialoge mit deutschen Denkern. (Geistiges Europa). Hoffmann & Campe, Hamburg 1949
- Schöpferischer Glaube im Zeitalter der Angst. Glock, Wiesbaden 1954

=== As an editor ===
- Albert Camus: Der Mythos von Sisyphos. Ein Versuch über das Absurde. Rowohlt, Reinbek bei Hamburg 1959 [u. ö. bis 1997], ISBN 3-499-22198-5 (with the essay Camus und die Philosophen in ihrer Aussage über das Absurde von Liselotte Richter, which is not included in the new translation from 1999.)
- Sören Kierkegaard: Werke. Europäische Verlagsanstalt, Hamburg (with the essay Zum Verständnis des Werks)
1. Der Begriff Angst. 1996, ISBN 3-434-46021-7.
2. Die Wiederholung. 2005, ISBN 3-434-46022-5.
3. Furcht und Zittern. 1998, ISBN 3-434-46023-3.
4. Die Krankheit zum Tode. 1995, ISBN 3-434-46024-1.
5. Philosophische Brocken. 1992, ISBN 3-434-46025-X.

== Sources ==
- Richard Schröder u. a. (Hrsg.): Nach jedem Sonnenuntergange bin ich verwundet und verwaist. Liselotte Richter zum 100. Geburtstag. Frank & Timme, Berlin 2006, ISBN 3-86596-088-X.
- Karl-Wolfgang Tröger: Liselotte Richter als Forscher- und Lehrerpersönlichkeit. In: Die Zeichen der Zeit. Volume 40, Issue 11, 1986, Pages 283–287.
- Karl-Wolfgang Tröger: Zur Geschichte des Spezialfaches Allgemeine Religionsgeschichte. In: Helmut Klein (Hrsg.): Zur Geschichte der Theologischen Fakultät Berlins. Humboldt-Universität, Berlin 1975, pages 577–579 (= Wissenschaftliche Zeitschrift der Humboldt-Universität zu Berlin Volume. 34, 1985).
- Catherina Wenzel: Von der Leidenschaft des Religiösen. Leben und Werk der Liselotte Richter (1906–1968). Böhlau, Köln 1999, ISBN 3-412-12198-3.
- "Liselotte Richter".
