= Silvio Vietta =

German linguist (born 1941)

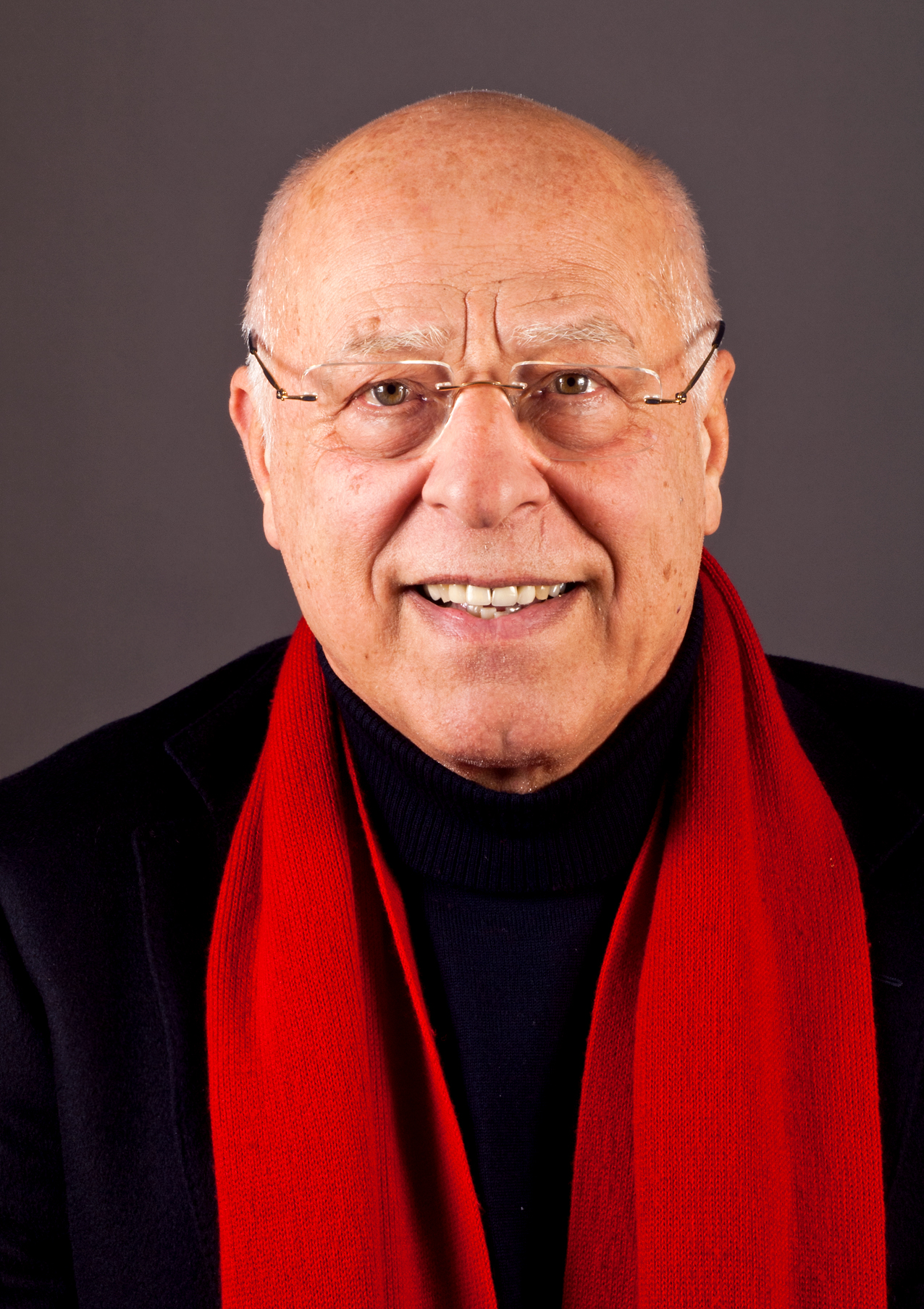
Silvio Vietta

Silvio Vietta (born 7 August 1941, in Berlin) is a German scholar and professor emeritus of the University of Hildesheim. His work has concerned itself principally with German literature, philosophy and European cultural history. His main areas of research are the literatures of Expressionism and Romanticism, and Literary Modernity. He has also published on Martin Heidegger, with whom he had personal contact while a student, and Hans-Georg Gadamer. His recent research has been in European cultural history, in particular the history of rationality.

== Biography ==
Silvio Vietta is the son of the writer Egon Vietta and Dorothea, born Feldhaus. He studied German Literature, Philosophy, English Literature and Education (1962–68) and received his PhD from the University of Würzburg in 1970 for a thesis on Language and the Reflection on Language in Modern Poetry. Vietta began his academic career as a lecturer in German at Elmira College, Elmira NY, and later taught at the German universities of Heidelberg, Tübingen, Mannheim and Hildesheim. In 1981 he finished his habilitation (German postdoctoral qualification) on Modern Rationality and Literary Criticism at the University of Mannheim. In 2006 he was a visiting professor at the University of Moscow (RGGU), in 2007 and 2008-09 visiting professor at the University of Sassari (Italy) and in 2012 visiting professor at the University of Campinas (Brazil). Vietta is a member of the advisory board of Angermion, the Yearbook of Anglo-German Literary Criticism (London), a member of AVUR (Agenzia nazionale valutazione ricerca Universitaria), Italy, and a member of the International German Society.

In 2006, he received the Friedrich Nietzsche Prize of the State of Saxony-Anhalt.

== Theory ==
Vietta has specialized in the macro-theory of the periods of Expressionism, Romanticism and Modernity, and in recent years has become one of the pioneers of 'Europeism' as a field of intercultural European Studies. In 2012 he published Texte zur Poetik (Texts on Poetics), a historical documentation of the basic European texts on poetics from Plato and Aristotle to Postmodernism and cybernetic poetics. His recent work is a long-term study of the history of rationality: Rationalität. Eine Weltgeschichte. Europäische Kulturgeschichte und die Globalisierung (Rationality: A History of the World - European Cultural History and Globalization, 2012), in which he shows how the European concept and practice of rationality has explored and conquered the world and led to the present world civilization. Vietta speaks of the "empire of rationality" as a world-governing power that includes different irrational effects.

== Publications ==
- Vietta, Silvio: Language and the Reflection on Language in Modern Poetry. Bad Homburg 1970.
- Vietta, Silvio: Expressionism. (with H.G. Kemper). Seventh Ed. Munich 2001 (1975).
- Vietta, Silvio: Modern Rationality and Literary Criticism. Munich 1981.
- Vietta, Silvio (ed.): Die literarische Frühromantik. Göttingen 1983.
- Vietta, Silvio: Literary Imagination. Theory and History. Stuttgart 1986.
- Vietta, Silvio: Heidegger's Criticism of National Socialism and Technology. Tübingen 1989. (French translation Paris 1993, Japan. Translation Tokio 1996).
- Vietta, Silvio: Literary Modernity. A problem-based History of German Literature from Hölderlin to Thomas Bernhard. Stuttgart 1992.
- Vietta, Silvio: "Die vollendete Speculation führt zur Natur zurück". Nature und Aesthetics. Leipzig 1995.
- Vietta, Silvio/Kemper, Dirk (Ed.): Aesthetic Modernism in Europe. Principles and Contexts since Romanticism. Munich 1998.
- Vietta, Silvio: Aesthetics of Modernity. Literature and Imagery. Munich 2001.
- Hans-Georg Gadamer/Vietta, Silvio: In Conversation. Munich 2002.
- Vietta, Silvio (Ed.): Modernity and Myth. Munich 2006.
- Vietta, Silvio: The European Novel of Modernity. Munich 2007.
- Vietta, Silvio: European Cultural History. An Introduction. Munich 2007.
- Vietta, Silvio (Ed.): Aesthetics - Religion - Secularisation I: From Renaissance to Romanticism. Munich 2008. Vol. II: Classical Modernity Munich 2008.
- Gehler, Michael/Vietta, Silvio (Ed.): Europe - Europeanisation - European Studies. New Scientific Methods and Contents. Vienna 2010.
- Vietta, Silvio (Ed.): Texts on Poetics. Darmstadt 2012.
- Vietta, Silvio/Rizzo, Roberto (Ed.): "sich an den Tod heranpürschen...". The Correspondence of Hermann Broch and Egon Vietta in the years 1933 - 1951. Göttingen 2012.
- Vietta, Silvio: Rationality: A History of the World - European Cultural History and Globalization. Munich 2012.
- Vietta, Silvio: A Theory of Global Civilization: Rationality and the Irrational as the Driving Forces of History. Kindle Ebooks 2013.
