= Hegel Prize =

Humanities award

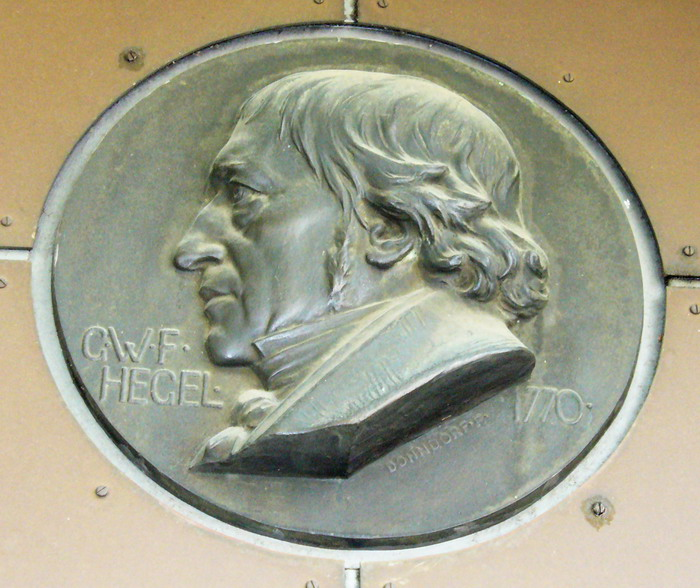
Hegel Prize humanities award

The Hegel Prize was founded by the city of Stuttgart in 1967 and has been awarded to a philosopher or humanities scholar every three years since 1970 in collaboration with the International Hegel Association. The prize was first awarded in 1970 on the occasion of Georg Wilhelm Friedrich Hegel's 200th birthday. The award is endowed with 12,000 euros. A jury decides on the award.

== Recipients ==
Year	Recipient	Country	Discipline
1970	Bruno Snell	Germany	Philology
1973	Jürgen Habermas	Germany	Philosophy
1976	Ernst Gombrich	Austria / UK	History
1979	Hans-Georg Gadamer	Germany	Philosophy
1982	Roman Jakobson	Russia	Linguistics / Literary criticism
1985	Paul Ricœur	France	Philosophy
1988	Niklas Luhmann	Germany	Sociology
1991	Donald Davidson	USA	Philosophy
1994	Jacques Le Goff	France	History
1997	Charles Taylor	Canada	Philosophy
2000	Norberto Bobbio	Italy	Law / Political science
2003	Dieter Henrich	Germany	Philosophy
2006	Richard Sennett	USA	Sociology
2009	Michael Tomasello	USA	Psychology
2012	Gertrude Lübbe-Wolff	Germany	Law
2015	Michael Theunissen	Germany	Philosophy
2018	Michael Stolleis	Germany	Law / History
2021	Béatrice Longuenesse	France	Philosophy
2024	Orlando Patterson	USA	Sociology

== See also ==
- Friedrich Nietzsche Prize
- Sigmund Freud Prize
- Karl Jaspers Prize
- Hannah Arendt Prize
