= Heinrich Rombach =

German philosopher (1923–2004)

- Born: 10 June 1923; Freiburg im Breisgau, Republic of Baden, Weimar Germany
- Died: 5 February 2004 (aged 80); Würzburg, Germany

Education
- Education: University of Freiburg (PhD, Dr. phil. hab.)
- Thesis: Über Ursprung und Wesen der Frage (1949)
- Doctoral advisor: Max Müller
- Other advisors: Eugen Fink; Martin Heidegger

Philosophical work
- Era: Contemporary philosophy
- Region: Western philosophy
- School: Continental philosophy, phenomenology
- Institutions: University of Freiburg; University of Würzburg
- Main interests: Ontology
- Notable ideas: Structural ontology

Heinrich Rombach (10 June 1923 – 5 February 2004) was a German philosopher and professor of philosophy at the University of Würzburg. He is known for developing structural ontology.

== Works ==
- Über Ursprung und Wesen der Frage, Freiburg / München: Alber 1952, ²1988. ISBN 3-495-47643-1
- Substanz System Struktur: Die Ontologie des Funktionalismus und der philosophische Hintergrund der modernen Wissenschaft, 2 Bde., Freiburg / München: Alber 1965/66, ²1981. Studienausgabe 2010 mit dem Untertitel Die Hauptepochen der europäischen Geistesgeschichte, Band 1: ISBN 978-3-495-48390-9, Band 2: ISBN 978-3-495-48391-6
- Strukturontologie: Eine Phänomenologie der Freiheit, Freiburg / München: Alber 1971, ²1988 ISBN 3-495-47637-7
- Mutmaßungen über das Ende der Hochkulturen, in: Philosophisches Jahrbuch 82 (1975), S. 241–258
- Phänomenologie heute, in: Phänomenologie heute: Grundlagen- und Methodenprobleme (= Phänomenologische Forschungen Bd. 1), Freiburg / München: Alber 1975, S. 11–30
- Leben des Geistes: Ein Buch der Bilder zur Fundamentalgeschichte der Menschheit, Freiburg/Basel/Wien: Herder 1977. ISBN 3-451-17546-0
- Die Grundstruktur der menschlichen Kommunikation: Zur kritischen Phänomenologie des Verstehens und Missverstehens, in: Mensch, Welt, Verständigung: Perspektiven einer Phänomenologie der Kommunikation (= Phänomenologische Forschungen Bd. 4), Freiburg / München: Alber 1978, S. 19–51
- Phänomenologische Erziehungswissenschaft und Strukturpädagogik, in: Klaus Schaller (Hrsg.), Erziehungswissenschaft der Gegenwart: Prinzipien und Perspektiven moderner Pädagogik, Bochum 1979, S. 136–154
- Phänomenologie des gegenwärtigen Bewusstseins, Freiburg / München: Alber 1980. ISBN 3-495-47434-X
- Das Phänomen Phänomen, in: Neuere Entwicklungen des Phänomenbegriffs (= Phänomenologische Forschungen Bd. 9), Freiburg / München: Alber 1980, S. 7–32
- Welt und Gegenwelt: Umdenken Über die Wirklichkeit. Die philosophische Hermetik, Basel: Herder 1983
- Zur Hermetik des Daseins: Ein philosophischer Versuch, in: Karl-Ernst Bühler/Heinz Weiß (Hrsg.), Kommunikation und Perspektivität: Beiträge zur Anthropologie aus Medizin und Geisteswissenschaften. Festschrift für Dieter Wyss zum 60. Geburtstag, Würzburg 1985, S. 13–19
- Philosophische Zeitkritik heute: Der gegenwärtige Umbruch im Licht der Fundamentalgeschichte, in: Philosophisches Jahrbuch 92 (1985), S. 1–16 [auch in: Die Welt als lebendige Struktur, S. 123–142]
- Strukturanthropologie: „Der menschliche Mensch“, Freiburg / München: Alber 1987, ²1993, Studienausgabe 2012 ISBN 978-3-495-48514-9
- Die sechs Schritte vom Einen zum Nicht-anderen, in: Philosophisches Jahrbuch 94 (1987), S. 225–245 [auch in: Die Welt als lebendige Struktur, S. 97–122]
- Die Gegenwart der Philosophie: Die Grundprobleme der abendländischen Philosophie und der gegenwärtige Stand des philosophischen Fragens, 3., grundlegend neu bearb. Aufl. Freiburg / München: Alber 1988. 3-495-47642-3
- Der kommende Gott: Hermetik – eine neue Weltsicht, Freiburg 1991
- Das Tao der Phänomenologie, in: Philosophisches Jahrbuch 98 (1991), S. 1–15 [auch in: Die Welt als lebendige Struktur, S. 51–70]
- Der Ursprung: Philosophie der Konkreativität von Mensch und Natur, Freiburg 1994
- Phänomenologie des sozialen Lebens: Grundzüge einer Phänomenologischen Soziologie, Freiburg / München: Alber 1994. ISBN 3-495-47754-3
- Drachenkampf: Der philosophische Hintergrund der blutigen Bürgerkriege, Freiburg 1996
- Die Welt als lebendige Struktur: Probleme und Lösungen der Strukturontologie, Freiburg 2003
- mit Kōichi Tsujimura und Ryosuke Ohashi: ‘‘Sein und Nichts. Grundbilder westlichen und östlichen Denkens. Basel / Freiburg / Wien: Herder 1981. ISBN 3-451-19432-5
- Hrsg.: Die Frage nach dem Menschen. Aufriß einer Philosophischen Anthropologie. Festschrift für Max Müller zum 60. Geburtstag. Freiburg / München: Alber 1966

== See also ==
- Georg Stenger
- Intercultural relations
- Cross-cultural communication
