= The Idea of the Good in Platonic-Aristotelian Philosophy =

- First edition
- Author: Hans-Georg Gadamer
- Original title: Die Idee des Guten zwischen Plato und Aristoteles
- Translator: P. Christopher Smith
- Language: German
- Subject: Ontology
- Published: 1978
- Publisher: Universitätsverlag Winter, Yale University Press
- Publication place: Germany
- English publication date: 1986
- ISBN: 978-3-8253-2648-7

The Idea of the Good in Platonic-Aristotelian Philosophy (German: Die Idee des Guten zwischen Plato und Aristoteles) is a 1978 book by the philosopher Hans-Georg Gadamer. P. Christopher Smith considers it among Gadamer's most important books, because it represents an extended example of Gadamerian hermeneutical techniques and provides new insights into Platonic-Aristotelian philosophy.
