= Michael Theunissen =

German philosopher (1932–2015)

- Born: 11 October 1932; Berlin, Weimar Germany
- Died: 18 April 2015 (aged 82); Berlin, Germany

Education
- Education: University of Bonn; University of Freiburg; Free University of Berlin
- Theses: Der Andere: Studien zur Sozialontologie der Gegenwart (1955); Der Begriff "Ernst" bei Sören Kierkegaard (1964)
- Doctoral advisor: Max Müller

Philosophical work
- Era: Contemporary philosophy
- Region: Western philosophy
- School: Continental philosophy, phenomenology
- Institutions: University of Heidelberg; Free University of Berlin
- Main interests: Social philosophy, philosophy of religion, philosophy of time
- Notable ideas: Dialectical negativism, negative theology of time

Michael Theunissen (11 October 1932 – 18 April 2015) was a German philosopher. He was successor to Hans-Georg Gadamer as chair of philosophy at the University of Heidelberg.

Theunissen has had a significant influence on German-language philosophy in the recent past.

== Biography ==
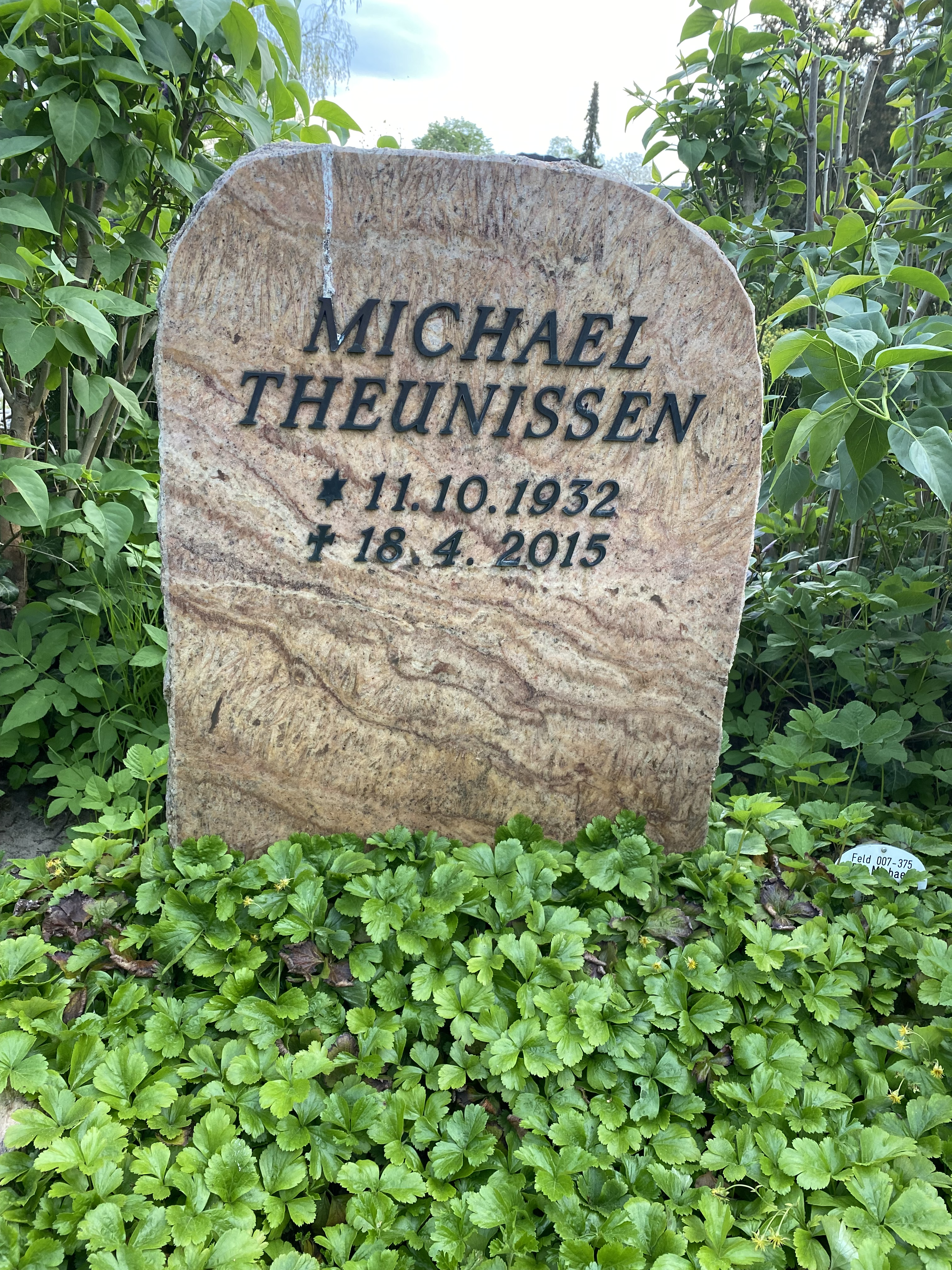
Grave site at Zehlendorf cemetery

Theunissen studied philosophy and German in University of Bonn and University of Freiburg. In 1955 he completed his doctorate in Freiburg under Max Müller with the thesis Der Begriff "Ernst" bei Sören Kierkegaard, (Note: The concept of "seriousness" in Sören Kierkegaard) and in 1964 he habilitated in Berlin with Der Andere: Studien zur Sozialontologie der Gegenwart. (Note: The Other: Studies on the Social Ontology of the Present) He became professor of philosophy at the University of Bern in Switzerland in 1967 and was appointed to the University of Heidelberg in 1971. From 1980 until his retirement in 1998, he held the chair of theoretical philosophy at the Free University of Berlin. The main areas of his research and publications were the philosophy of Hegel and Kierkegaard, modern social philosophy and phenomenology, the philosophy of time, the ancient Greek poet Pindar and archaic Greek poetry. In 1995, he was awarded an honorary doctorate by the Faculty of Theology of the University of Copenhagen in recognition of his contributions to Kierkegaard studies. He was also awarded an honorary doctorate by the Faculty of Cultural and Social Sciences at the University of Lucerne, and a third honorary doctorate by the Faculty of Theology at the Georg August University of Göttingen on 13 April 2005.

“His numerous, perceptive and erudite writings on modern and ancient philosophy have made Michael Theunissen one of the most prominent philosophers of the present day among experts," said Joachim Ringleben, systematist at the Faculty of Theology in Göttingen.

Theunissen's work on the I-Thou relationship, revelation, philosophical Christology, despair and prayer is of particular importance to theology and philosophy of religion.

His theological and philosophical work has been awarded numerous honors and prizes, such as the Dr. Leopold Lucas Prize in 2001, the Karl Jaspers Prize (Heidelberg, 2004), the Hegel Prize (Stuttgart, 2015 posthumously) and several honorary doctorates. His students include Emil Angehrn, Karen Gloy, Günter Figal, Ulrich Pothast, Hinrich Fink-Eitel, Georg Lohmann, Christian Iber, Uwe Justus Wenzel, Brigitte Hilmer and Stascha Rohmer.

Michael Theunissen died at the age of 82 and was laid to rest in the Zehlendorf cemetery.

== Works in English ==
- The Other: Studies in the Social Ontology of Husserl, Heidegger, Sartre, and Buber, Translated by Christopher Macann, Cambridge, MA: The MIT Press, 1986, ISBN 978-0262700290.
- Kierkegaard's Concept of Despair, Translated by Barbara Harshav Helmut Illbruck, Princeton, NJ: Princeton University Press, 2005, ISBN 9780691095585.
- Scope and Limits of Recollection, Tübingen: Mohr Siebeck 2001.
- "Notion and Reality: Hegel's Sublation of the Metaphysical Notion of Truth". Graduate Faculty Philosophy Journal. 23 (2). 2002. doi:10.5840/gfpj20022321.

== Works in German (selection) ==
- Der Begriff Ernst bei Søren Kierkegaard. Freiburg i. Br. / München: Verlag Karl Alber 1958 (Symposion 1) ISBN 3-495-44030-5
- Der Andere: Studien zur Sozialontologie der Gegenwart. Berlin: de Gruyter 1965 (2. Aufl. 1977: ISBN 3-11-008657-3)
- Gesellschaft und Geschichte: Zur Kritik der kritischen Theorie. Berlin: de Gruyter 1969 (2. Aufl. 1981: ISBN 3-11-008687-5)
- Sein und Schein: die kritische Funktion der Hegelschen Logik. Frankfurt am Main: Suhrkamp 1978 ISBN 3-518-07209-9 (2. Aufl. 1980: ISBN 3-518-07914-X)
- Selbstverwirklichung und Allgemeinheit: zur Kritik des gegenwärtigen Bewusstseins. Berlin; New York: de Gruyter 1982 ISBN 3-11-008781-2
- Negative Theologie der Zeit. Frankfurt am Main: Suhrkamp 1991 (Suhrkamp-Taschenbuch Wissenschaft; 938) ISBN 3-518-28538-6
- Das Selbst auf dem Grund der Verzweiflung. Frankfurt am Main: Hain 1991 (Anton Hain; Nr. 14) ISBN 3-445-06014-2
- Der Begriff Verzweiflung: Korrekturen an Kierkegaard. Frankfurt am Main: Suhrkamp 1993 (Suhrkamp-Taschenbuch Wissenschaft; 1062) ISBN 3-518-28662-5
- Pindar: Menschenlos und Wende der Zeit. München: Beck 2000. ISBN 3-406-46169-7 (3. Aufl. 2008)
- Reichweite und Grenzen der Erinnerung, Tübingen: Mohr Siebeck 2001.
- Schicksal in Antike und Moderne (Erweiterte Fassung eines Vortrags, gehalten in der Carl-Friedrich-von-Siemens-Stiftung am 17. Mai 2004). München: Carl-Friedrich-von-Siemens-Stiftung 2004.

== See also ==
- Jürgen Habermas
- Dieter Henrich
- Hermann Lübbe
- Odo Marquard
- Robert Spaemann
- Ernst Tugendhat
