= Heidegger's Ways =

1983 essay collection by Hans-Georg Gadamer

- Author: Hans-Georg Gadamer
- Original title: Heideggers Wege
- Translator: John W. Stanley
- Language: German
- Publisher: J.C.B. Mohr
- Publication date: 1983
- Publication place: West Germany
- English publication date: 1994
- Pages: 166
- ISBN: 3162446414

Heidegger's Ways (German: Heideggers Wege. Studien zum Spätwerk) is a collection of essays, speeches and lectures by the German philosopher Hans-Georg Gadamer, published by J.C.B. Mohr in 1983. It contains 15 texts about the philosophy of Martin Heidegger, its historical context and Gadamer's relationship to it. Gadamer stressed how Heidegger's approach to ontology was based on diverse sources such as Protestant theology, pre-Socratic philosophy and the poetry of Friedrich Hölderlin.

== Contents ==
- "Existentialism and the Philosophy of Existence" (1981)
- "Martin Heidegger—75 Years" (1964)
- "The Marburg Theology" (1964)
- "'What Is Metaphysics?'" (1978)
- "Kant and the Hermeneutical Turn" (1975)
- "The Thinker Martin Heidegger" (1969)
- "The Language of Metaphysics" (1968)
- "Plato" (1976)
- "The Truth of the Work of Art" (1960)
- "Martin Heidegger—85 Years" (1974)
- "The Way in the Turn" (1979)
- "The Greeks" (1979)
- "The History of Philosophy" (1981)
- "The Religious Dimension" (1981)
- "Being Spirit God" (1977)
