= Wolfgang Müller-Lauter =

German philosopher (1924–2001)

Wolfgang Müller-Lauter (August 31, 1924 in Weimar – August 9, 2001 in Berlin) was a German philosopher and scholar. He is particularly known for his groundbreaking work on the philosophy of Friedrich Nietzsche, considered to be one of the most important contributions to the study of Nietzsche in the twentieth century. He was Ordinary Professor of Philosophy at the Kirchliche Hochschule Berlin and from 1993 Emeritus Professor in the Theological Faculty of the Humboldt University Berlin.

Müller-Lauter began his career with a doctoral thesis on Martin Heidegger, to whose work he had been led through a study of Jean-Paul Sartre. In preparing a lecture course on the roots of nihilism in the twentieth century at the Kirchliche Hochschule in Berlin, Müller-Lauter became increasingly interested in Nietzsche's treatment of the problem of nihilism. Müller-Lauter's own approach to Nietzsche is marked by a critique of Heidegger's then prevalent reading of Nietzsche's thought. In particular, Müller-Lauter took issue with Heidegger's characterization of Nietzsche as the “last metaphysician of the West.” Heidegger had seen Nietzsche as attempting, but ultimately failing, to overcome the metaphysical tradition. Müller-Lauter argued cogently on the basis of a detailed analysis of Nietzsche's texts that the role that Heidegger reserved for himself had in fact been effectively performed by Nietzsche himself. Central to this interpretation was the reexamination of the “doctrine” of the will to power found in Nietzsche's work, turning it from a metaphysical doctrine (as in Heidegger's interpretation) into a theory of a plurality of will-to-power quanta dynamically interacting with one another in processes with an inherently contradictory and perspectival character. This work set a new standard of rigor and seriousness in Nietzsche scholarship as well as establishing an influential reading of Nietzsche's work.

Müller-Lauter was a co-founder of the journal Nietzsche-Studien in 1971, and continued to co-edit the journal until 1996. He was also co-founder and co-editor (from 1972 to 1996) of the book series Monographien und Texte zur Nietzsche-Forschung published by de Gruyter. After the death of Mazzino Montinari in 1986 Müller-Lauter took over the co-editorship of the complete critical edition of Nietzsche's Works (KGW) produced by de Gruyter.

In 1996 he was the first recipient of the Friedrich Nietzsche Prize.

== Books ==
Nietzsche: His Philosophy of Contradictions and the Contradictions of His Philosophy, trans. David J. Parent (Urbana IL, 1999).

== Articles ==
- "On Associating with Nietzsche" (trans. R. J. Hollingdale), in: Journal of Nietzsche Studies 4/5 (1992/93), 5-35.
- "Nietzsche’s Teaching of Will to Power", in: Journal of Nietzsche Studies 4/5 (1992/93), 37-101.
- "A Continual Challenge. On Mazzino Montinari’s Relationship with Nietzsche", in: Journal of Nietzsche Studies 4/5 (1992/93), 103-125.
- "The Spirit of Revenge and the Eternal recurrence", in: Journal of Nietzsche Studies 4/5 (1992/93), 127-153.
- "Experiences with Nietzsche", in J. Golomb and R. S. Wistrich (eds.), Nietzsche: Godfather of Fascism? (Princeton, 2002), 66-89.

== Books ==
- Möglichkeit und Wirklichkeit bei Martin Heidegger (Berlin, 1960).
- Nietzsche. Seine Philosophie der Gegensätze und die Gegensätze seiner Philosophie (Berlin/New York, 1971).
- Dostoevskijs Ideendialektik (Berlin/New York, 1974).
- Über Werden und Wille zur Macht. Nietzsche-Interpretationen I (Berlin/New York, 1999).
- Über Freiheit und Chaos. Nietzsche-Interpretationen II (Berlin/New York, 1999).
- Heidegger und Nietzsche. Nietzsche-Interpretationen III (Berlin/New York, 2000).

== Articles ==
- "Kants Widerlegung des materialen Idealismus", in: Archiv für Geschichte der Philosophie 46 (1964), 60-82.
- "Nietzsches Lehre vom Willen zur Macht", in: Nietzsche-Studien 3 (1974), 1-60.
- "Der Organismus als innerer Kampf. Der Einfluß von Wilhelm Roux auf Friedrich Nietzsche", in: Nietzsche-Studien 7 (1978), 189-235.
- "Das Willenswesen und der Übermensch. Ein Beitrag zu Heideggers Nietzsche-Interpretationen", in: Nietzsche-Studien 10/11 (1981/1982), 132-192.
- "Der Wille zur Macht als Buch der 'Krisis' philosophischer Nietzsche-Interpretation", in: Nietzsche-Studien 24 (1995), 223-260.
- "Nietzsche und Heidegger als nihilistische Denker. Zu Gianni Vattimos 'postmodernistischer' Deutung", in: Nietzsche-Studien 27 (1998), 52-81.
- "Über 'Nietzsches Folgen' und Nietzsche", in: Nietzscheforschung 4 (1998), 21-40.

=== Secondary literature ===
- Köster, Peter, "Die Problematik wissenschaftlicher Nietzsche-Interpretation. Kritische Überlegungen zu Wolfgang Müller-Lauters Nietzschebuch", in: Nietzsche-Studien 2 (1973), 31-60.
- Aydin, Ciano, "Müller-Lauter’s Nietzsche", in: A. Woodward (ed.), Interpreting Nietzsche (London/New York, 2011), 99-115.
