= The Beginning of Philosophy =

1993 book by Hans-Georg Gadamer

- Author: Hans-Georg Gadamer
- Original title: L'inizio della filosofia occidentale
- Translator: Rod Coltman
- Language: Italian
- Subject: Pre-Socratic philosophy
- Publisher: Guerini e associati
- Publication date: 1993
- Publication place: Italy
- English publication date: 1998
- Pages: 150
- ISBN: 8878024155

The Beginning of Philosophy is a book by the German philosopher Hans-Georg Gadamer. It is a hermeneutic work about pre-Socratic philosophy, which Gadamer held to be the beginning of Western culture. Opposing the modern tendency of understanding philosophy as a series of systems, Gadamer stressed the primordial role of thinking and used the pre-Socratic material as a starting point for insights about being.

The book is a transcription of an unscripted series of lectures Gadamer held in Italy in 1988, itself based on a course he held at Heidelberg University in 1967. The book was first published in Italian in 1993 as L'inizio della filosofia occidentale (lit. 'The Beginning of Western Philosophy'). A German translation by Joachim Schulte appeared in 1996 as Der Anfang der Philosophie and was subsequently revised by Gadamer. The English translation by Rod Coltman is based on the revised German version and was published in 1998.
