= Donatella Di Cesare =

Italian political philosopher, essayist, and professor (born 1956)

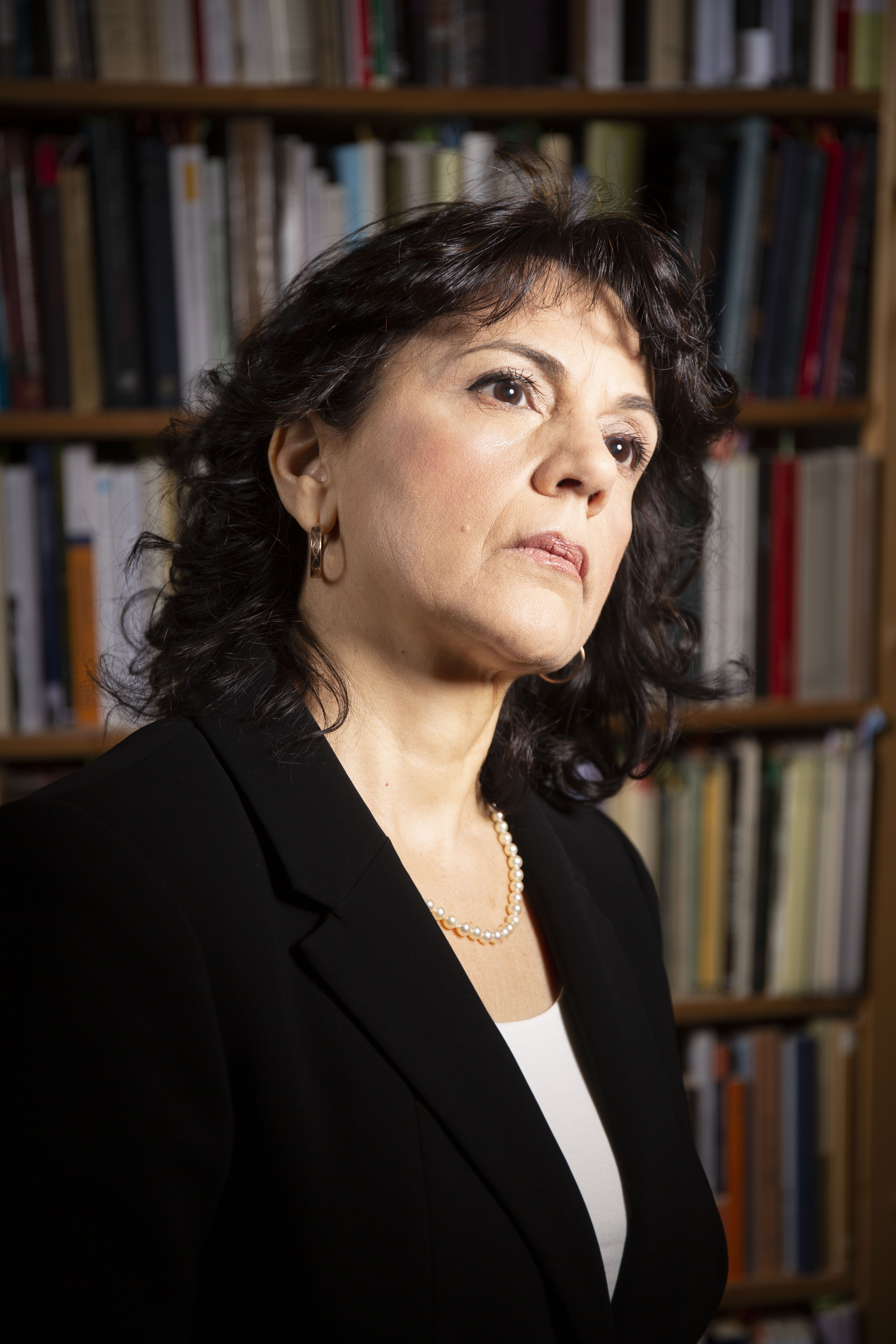
- Di Cesare in 2019
- Born: Donatella Ester Di Cesare; April 29, 1956 (age 70); Rome, Italy
- Occupations: Philosopher; essayist; editorialist
- Employer: Sapienza University of Rome

Donatella Ester Di Cesare (born 29 April 1956) is an Italian political philosopher, essayist, and editorialist. She currently serves as professor of theoretical philosophy at the Sapienza University of Rome. Di Cesare collaborates with various Italian newspapers and magazines, including L'Espresso and il manifesto. Her books and essays have been translated into English, French, German, Spanish, Portuguese, Danish, Serbian, Croatian, Polish, Finnish, Norwegian, Turkish, and Chinese.

== Biography ==
Di Cesare was born in Rome, Italy, on 29 April 1956. In the early stages of her education, she studied primarily in West Germany, first at the University of Tübingen, then at the University of Heidelberg, where she was the last student of Hans-Georg Gadamer. At Heidelberg, she focused on the study of phenomenology and philosophical hermeneutics. She offered her own perspective on these two disciplines, which is close to Jacques Derrida's deconstruction. Those studies would have been included in many of her essays that were published subsequently, and two books: Utopia of Understanding (Albany, New York: SUNY Press, 2013) and Gadamer (Indiana University Press, Bloomington, Indiana, 2013). After the publication of Martin Heidegger's Schwarze Hefte, she wrote the book Heidegger and the Jews: The Black Notebooks (Polity Press, Cambridge and Boston, 2018) on Heidegger's philosophical thought and his political affiliation with Nazism.

The theme of violence was developed in Torture (Cambridge and Boston: Polity Press, 2018). In the book Terror and Modernity (Cambridge and Boston: Polity Press, 2019), the political and ethical questions in the era of globalization have pushed her to investigate the current phenomenon of Islamic terrorism, jihadism, and the attempts to establish a global caliphate, evaluated within the socio-political context of what she labelled as "phobocracy" and the "global civil war".

In 2017, a political turn occurred in the development of her thought, when she resumed the topic of sovereignty, previously addressed in the essays she dedicated to the political theology of Baruch Spinoza. The momentous conflict between the state and migrants is the central theme of her book Resident Foreigners: A Philosophy of Migration (Cambridge and Boston: Polity Press, 2020), which was awarded the Pozzale prize for essays 2018 and the Sila prize for economy and society 2018.

The political-philosophical questions about the strangeness and the myth of identity are instead the topics of the book Marranos: The Other of the Other (Cambridge and Boston: Polity Press, 2020). Recently, she offered a summary of her philosophical positions in the book Sulla vocazione politica della filosofia (Turin: Bollati Boringhieri, 2018). The book was awarded the prize Mimesis Filosofia 2019.

She is a member of the Scientific Committee of the Internationale Wittgenstein-Gesellschaft and Wittgenstein-Studien. From 2011 to 2015, she was vice president of the Martin Heidegger-Gesellschaft, from which she resigned on 3 March 2015, after the publication of Schwarze Hefte. She is also a member of the Associazione Italiana Walter Benjamin. Since 2016, she has been the editor of the book series Filosofia per il XXI secolo for the publishing house Mimesis. Since 2018, she has been a member of the Consiglio Scientifico e Strategico of the CIR Onlus (Consiglio Italiano per I Rifugiati).

She was a visiting professor at several universities: Stiftung-University of Hildesheim (Germany), 2003; Albert-Ludwig Universität in Freiburg (Germany), 2005; Kulturwissenschaftliches Forschungskolleg in Cologne (Germany), 2007. During the winter semester of 2007, she was Distinguished Visiting Professor of Arts and Humanities at Pennsylvania State University (US). In 2012, she was a visiting professor at the Department of Languages and Literatures at Brandeis University (US). In the winter semester of 2006, she was a Brockington Visitor at Queen's University (Canada). In 2017, she held a teaching position for one year at the Scuola Normale Superiore in Pisa.

In an appearance on a television talk show, she criticised the Italian agriculture minister Francesco Lollobrigida for invoking "ethnic replacement" in a talk in 2023 about migration. Di Cesare described this as a "conspiracist myth", and stated of Lollobrigida: "I believe that the minister’s words cannot be taken as a gaffe, because he spoke like a Gauleiter, like a neo-Hitlerite governor". Following this, she has been criminally indicted for defamation.

Upon the death of the Red Brigades member and terrorist Barbara Balzerani on March 5, 2024, Donatella Di Cesare published the following post on X: "La tua rivoluzione è stata anche la mia. Le vie diverse non cancellano le idee. Con malinconia un addio alla compagna Luna. #barbarabalzerani" ("Your revolution was also mine. Different paths do not erase ideas. With melancholy, a farewell to comrade Luna. #barbarabalzerani"). The statement prompted considerable controversy and widespread criticism. Following the post, the rector of Sapienza University of Rome, Antonella Polimeni, immediately distanced herself from the statements made by the faculty member, expressing "sconcerto" ("dismay"), condemning "ogni forma di violenza" ("all forms of violence"), and rejecting "qualsiasi dichiarazione di condivisione o vicinanza a idee, fatti e persone che non rispettano o non hanno rispettato le leggi della Repubblica e i principi democratici espressi dalla Costituzione" ("any statement expressing support for or closeness to ideas, actions, or individuals that do not respect, or have not respected, the laws of the Republic and the democratic principles enshrined in the Constitution").

== Bibliography ==
=== In English ===
- Resident Foreigners: A Philosophy of Migration, Cambridge and Boston: Polity Press, 2020.
- Terror and Modernity, Cambridge and Boston: Polity Press, 2019.
- Torture, Polity Press, Cambridge and Boston, 2018.
- Heidegger and the Jews: The Black Notebooks, Cambridge and Boston: Polity Press, 2018.
- Gadamer, Bloomington: Indiana University Press, 2013.
- Utopia of Understanding. Between Babel and Auschwitz, Albany: SUNY Press, 2012.

=== In Italian ===
- Tecnofascismo, Turin: Giulio Einaudi editore, 2024.
- Democrazia e anarchia. Il potere nella polis, Turin: Giulio Einaudi editore, 2024.
- Il complotto al potere, Turin: Giulio Einaudi editore, 2021.
- Il tempo della rivolta, Turin: Bollati Boringhieri, 2020.
- Virus sovrano? L’asfissia capitalistica, Turin: Bollati Boringhieri, 2020.
- Sulla vocazione politica della filosofia, Turin: Bollati Boringhieri, 2018.
- Marrani, Turin: Einaudi, 2018.
- Terrore e modernità, Turin: Einaudi, 2017.
- Stranieri residenti. Una filosofia della migrazione, Turin: Bollati Boringhieri, 2017.
- Tortura, Turin: Bollati Boringhieri, 2016.
- Heidegger & Sons. Eredità e futuro di un filosofo, Turin: Bollati Boringhieri, 2015.
- Heidegger e gli ebrei. I "Quaderni neri", Turin: Bollati Boringhieri, 2014.
- Se Auschwitz è nulla. Contro il negazionismo, Genoa: Il melangolo, 2012.
- Grammatica dei tempi messianici, [1st edn Milan: Albo Versorio, 2008] Firenze: Giuntina, 2011.
- Gadamer, Bologna: Il Mulino, 2007.
- Ermeneutica della finitezza, Milan: Guerini & Associati, 2004.
- Utopia del comprendere, Genoa: il nuovo melangolo, 2003.
