= Taha Abdurrahman =

Moroccan philosopher

Taha Abderrahmane
- طه عبد الرحمن
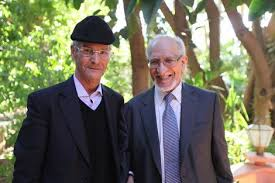
- Taha Abderrahmane in 2016 (right) with his student and colleague Professor Hammou Neqqari.
- Born: 28 May 1944 (age 82); El Jadida province of El Jadida, Morocco

Philosophical work
- Era: 20th / 21st-century philosophy
- Region: Western philosophy, Islamic philosophy
- Main interests: Philosophy of language; Logic; Morality; Islam and science; Social criticism; Metaphysics

Taha Abderrahmane (Arabic: طه عبد الرحمن, romanized: Ṭāhā ʿAbd al-Raḥmān; born 28 May 1944) is a Moroccan philosopher and one of the leading philosophers and thinkers in the Arab and Islamic worlds. His work centers on logic, philosophy of language, moral philosophy, and contractarian ethics. He believes in multiple modernities and seeks to establish an ethical and humanitarian modernity based on the values and principles of Islam and the Arab tradition.

== Early life and education ==
Abderrahmane was born on 28 May 1944 and raised in El Jadida (province of El Jadida), Morocco. There, he attended primary school, after which he moved to Casablanca, where he continued his high school education. He later joined Mohammad V University (in Rabat, Morocco), where he obtained his licentiate in philosophy. Abderrahmane completed his studies at the University of Sorbonne, where he received his second licentiate and obtained his third-level doctorate in 1972 on the subject: "Language and philosophy: a study of the linguistic structures of ontology", and in 1985 he earned his Ph.D. in philosophy on the subject "study of argumentation and its methods" (in French: Essai sur les logiques des raisonnements argumentatifs et naturels, or in English as "Essay on the logic of argumentative and natural reasonings").

In addition to speaking Arabic, French, and English, he also reads German, Latin and Ancient Greek in order to read philosophers in their original languages.

Abderrahmane is known in all his books as "Taha Abderrahmane", although his given name is Abderrahmane and his family name is Taha. Scholars in the Anglophone world often repeat "Abderrahmane" as if it were his family name, following the way it appears in his books, while in the Arab world, his philosophy is known under the name "Taha'iyya", i.e., "Taha'ian". The official spelling of his name in official documentation is Abderrahmane (not Abdurrahman or Abdul Rahman).

== Academic career ==
Abderrahmane served as a professor of philosophy of language and logic at Mohammad V University from 1970 until his retirement in 2005. He is a member of the International Society for the Study of Argumentation, which he represents in Morocco; a representative of the Society of Intercultural Philosophy (German: Gesellschaft für Interkulturelle Philosophie); and director of the Wisdom Circle for Thinkers and Researchers.

Abderrahmane was awarded the Prize of Morocco twice. In 2006, he received the ISESCO Prize in Islamic thought and philosophy.

== Characteristics of his method ==
His philosophical practice is characterized by a combination of "logical analysis" and "linguistic derivation" proceeding from a mystical experience, within a framework that provides the concepts related to the Islamic heritage and is based on the most important achievements of modern Western thought at the level of "theories of speech", "argumentative logic", and "philosophy of ethics", which makes his philosophizing predominantly appear in a "moral" and "deliberative" style.

== Most important works ==
- Language and philosophy: an essay on the linguistic structures of ontology (in French), 1979
- A treatise on deductive and natural argumentation and its models (in French), 1985
- Formal Logic and Grammar, 1985
- On the basics of Dialogue and Renovation of Islamic Theology, 1987
- Religious Practice and Renewal of Reason, 1989
- Renovation of the Method in Assessing the Heritage, 1994
- Praxeology of Philosophy I: Philosophy and Translation, 1994
- Language and Balance, or Multiplicity of Reason, 1998
- Praxeology of Philosophy II.1: The Philosophical Sentence, the Book of the Concept and Etymology, 1999
- The Question of Ethics: A Contribution to Ethical Criticism of Western Modernity, 2000
- Dialogues for the Future, 2000
- The Arabic Right to Differ in Philosophy, 2002
- The Islamic Right to Be Intellectually Different, 2005
- The Spirit of Modernity: An Introduction to Founding Islamic Modernity, 2006
- Modernity and Resistance, 2007
- The Question of Practice, 2012
- The Spirit of Religion, 2012
- Dialogue as Horizon of Thought, 2013
- The Poverty of Secularism, 2014
- The Question of Method: Toward a New Paradigm in Thinking, 2015
- The Post-Secularism: A Critique of the Separation Between Ethics and Religion, 2016
- The Wandering of the Post-Secularism, 2016
- The Religion of Decency, 2017
- Ethical Concepts Between Fiduciarism and Secularism, 2 volumes, 2021
- Sharia Objectives from Fiduciary Ethics Perspective, 2022
- The Question of Philosophical Autobiography: An Inquiry into Fiduciary Philosophy, 2023

== Sources ==
- Wisdom Forum for Thinkers and Researchers.
- Mohammed Hashas, "Islamic Philosophy III: The Question of Ethics: Taha Abderrahmane's Praxeology and Trusteeship Paradigm," Resetdoc, 23 Sept. 2014, http://www.resetdoc.org/story/00000022452.
- Mohammed Hashas, "Taha Abderrahmane’s Trusteeship Paradigm: Spiritual Modernity and the Islamic Contribution to the Formation of a Renewed Universal Civilization of Ethos," Oriente Moderno 95 (2015), pp. 67–105.
- Mohammed Hashas, L’etica islamica nel paradigma di responsabilità di Taha Abderrahmane, traduzione a cura di Sabrina Lei (Roma: Tawasul Europe, Centro per la ricerca ed il dialogo, 2018), 53 p. ISBN 978-1-9804-4564-7.
- Mohammed Hashas, The Idea of European Islam: Religion, Ethics, Politics and Perpetual Modernity (London and New York: Routledge, 2019), chapters 6–7.
- Wael Hallaq, Reforming Modernity: Ethics and the New Human in the Philosophy of Abdurrahman Taha, Columbia University Press, 2019, 376 p. ISBN 978-0-231-19388-7.
- Mohammed Hashas and Mutaz al-Khatib, eds., Islamic Ethics and the Trusteeship Paradigm: Taha Abderrahmane's Philosophy in Comparative Perspectives (Leiden: Brill, 2020), pp. 382. ISBN 978-90-04-43836-1.
- Mohammed Hashas, "The Arab Right to Philosophical Difference: The Concept of the Awakened Youth in the Political Philosophy of Taha Abderrahmane," in Islam in International Affairs: Politics and Paradigms, eds. Nassef Manabilang Adiong, Raffaele Mauriello, and Deina Abdelkader (Routledge, Wordling beyond the West book series, 2019), pp. 39–61. ISBN 978-1-138-20093-7.
- Mohammed Hashas, "The Political Theology of Taha Abderrahmane: Religion, Secularism, and Trusteeship," in Islamic Political Theology, eds. Massimo Campanini and Marco di Donato (New York and London: Lexington Books, 2021), pp. 113–133. ISBN 978-1-4985-9058-7.
- Yousef AlQurashi, "Is Taha Abdurrahman a Contractarian Philosopher?", Journal of Islamic Research 33 (3), 704–721, doi:10.17613/ngj0-4b06.
- Taha Abderrahmane, Dialogues for the Future, translated by Abdellah El Boubekri, foreword by Mohammed Hashas (Leiden, Boston: Brill, 2024). ISBN 978-90-04-68083-8.
- Yousef AlQurashi, Ethical Citizenship Reimagined: Taha Abdurrahman's Mu'ākhāh Framework, 2026. https://doi.org/10.1080/1462317X.2025.2610789.
