= Karl Jaspers Prize =

- Awarded for: a scientific work of international significance supported by philosophical spirit
- Country: Germany
- Presented by: Heidelberg, University of Heidelberg
- Reward: €25,000
- First award: 1983
- Website: www.heidelberg.de/hd,Lde/HD/Rathaus/Karl_Jaspers_Preis.html

The Karl Jaspers Prize or Karl-Jaspers-Preis is a German philosophy award named after Karl Jaspers and awarded by the city of Heidelberg and the University of Heidelberg. It was first awarded in 1983 "for a scientific work of international significance supported by philosophical spirit". The Karl Jaspers Prize is endowed with €25,000. Next to the Friedrich Nietzsche Prize it is one of the highest awards in Germany awarded exclusively for philosophical achievements.

== Award winners ==
Year	Winner	Nationality Seyla Benhabib
2026	Seyla Benhabib	United States
2022	Volker Gerhardt	Germany
2019	Rudolf G. Wagner	Germany
2017	Jan Assmann and Aleida Assmann	Germany
2014	Hans Maier	Germany
2008	Jean-Luc Marion	France
2004	Michael Theunissen	Germany
2001	Robert Spaemann	Germany
1998	Jean Starobinski	Switzerland
1995	Jürgen Habermas	Germany
1992	Jeanne Hersch	Switzerland
1989	Paul Ricœur	France
1986	Hans-Georg Gadamer	Germany
1983	Emmanuel Levinas	France
