= Heidelberg school (philosophy) =

Philosophical school founded by Dieter Henrich

The Heidelberg school (Note: Also known as the Heidelberg school of philosophy of subjectivity.) (German: Heidelberger Schule) is a philosophical school founded by Dieter Henrich which focuses on the problem of Self-consciousness. The term was introduced with critical intent by Ernst Tugendhat.

The origin of the Schule lies in the Heidelberg years (1965–1981) of Dieter Henrich, in which he founded it with his programmatic philosophical works, together with his students Manfred Frank, Konrad Cramer and Ulrich Pothast begründete. The Heidelberg school takes a diversified approach and draws on the traditions of German idealism, neo-Kantianism, analytic philosophy and phenomenology.

== Position ==
The essay Fichte’s Original Insight, published by Dieter Henrich in 1966 in the commemorative volume for Wolfgang Cramer, is considered the founding text of the Heidelberg School. In it, Henrich, following Fichte, concludes that the classical reflective theory of self-consciousness is untenable. The latter had attempted to explain self-consciousness as arising from the explicit turning of (unconscious) consciousness back upon itself. However, in order to turn back on itself, the self must know what it is relating to. It must therefore already possess self-knowledge—and thus self-consciousness—if it is to act reflexively. This leads the model of reflection—according to Fichte and Henrich—into a “vicious circle”. However, this not only fails to explain self-consciousness, but “consequently, there is no consciousness at all”.

== Sources ==
- Ansichten der Subjektivität. Suhrkamp. 2012. ISBN 9783518296219.
- Dieter Henrich and Contemporary Philosophy. The return to subjectivity. Ashgate. 2003. ISBN 0-7546-1344-5.
- From Metafact to Metaphysics in "the Heidelberg School". Vol. 36. 2019. doi:10.5840/protosociology2019363.
- Das transzendentale Selbstbewusstsein bei Kant. Zu Kants Begriff des Selbstbewusstseins im Lichte der Kritik der Heidelberger Schule. Dr. Kovač. 2018. ISBN 9783339105264.
- Selbstbewußtsein und Selbstbestimmung. Sprachanalytische Interpretationen. Suhrkamp. 2010. ISBN 9783518278215.
- Self-Awareness and Alterity. A Phenomenological Investigation. 1999.
- The Heidelberg School and the Limits of Reflection. Studies in the History of Philosophy of Mind. 2007. pp. 267–286.
