= Max Müller (philosopher) =

German philosopher (1906–1994)

- Born: 6 September 1906; Offenburg, Grand Duchy of Baden, German Empire
- Died: 18 October 1994 (aged 88); Freiburg im Breisgau, Baden-Württemberg, Germany

Education
- Education: University of Berlin (attended); LMU Munich (attended); University of Paris (attended); University of Freiburg (Dr. phil., Dr. phil. hab.)
- Doctoral advisor: Martin Honecker
- Other advisor: Martin Heidegger

Philosophical work
- Era: 20th-century philosophy
- Region: Western philosophy
- School: Continental philosophy, phenomenology, existentialism
- Institutions: University of Freiburg; LMU Munich
- Doctoral students: Albert Borgmann, Odo Marquard, Lorenz Bruno Puntel Heinrich Rombach, Michael Theunissen
- Notable students: William J. Richardson
- Main interests: Metaphysics, philosophy of history, philosophical anthropology
- Notable ideas: Metahistory (Metahistorik), transcendental experience

Max Müller (6 September 1906 – 18 October 1994) was a German philosopher and influential post–World War II Catholic intellectual. Müller was Professor at the University of Freiburg and LMU Munich.

== Life ==
Max Müller was the son of a jurist and completed his Gymnasium-Abitur in Freiburg at the Friedrich-Gymnasium Freiburg. He graduated in 1930 along with the philosopher Martin Honecker. He established his academic reputation in 1937 with a work on Thomas Aquinas ("Reality and Rationality"'). At that time he was active in the Catholic Youth Movement who were influenced by their study with Martin Heidegger, generating their own thinking in engagement with his philosophy. During the Third Reich they were opponents of Nazism. Falling foul of Nazi educational policies, Müller was dismissed by Heidegger from research positions.

He became a member of Sturmabteilung in 1934 and applied for membership in NSDAP in 1937, but he was not accepted until 1940.

He became active as a lecturer at the Catholic Collegium Borromaeum (Freiburg im Breisgau). After the war he succeeded Martin Honecker at the University of Freiburg.

In addition to his activity at the university Müller was active in addressing social problems in Freiburg. In 1960, he moved to LMU Munich. After his retirement he returned to Freiburg to research philosophy and theology.

Müller's main influences were Honecker, Edmund Husserl and Heidegger. He was also influenced by the historian Friedrich Meinecke and the theologian Romano Guardini.

== Philosophy ==
Müller linked classical metaphysics with phenomenology of Husserl and the existentialism of Heidegger. He developed from it a theory of "metahistory" as a philosophy of historical liberty. For Müller, the sense of history is distinctive in each epoch. The "transcendental experience" of humans is created in personal engagement through communal achievement in the world as work. Politics, religion, art and science, along with the personal relationships between people, carry material and symbolic means to attempt answers and achieve effective representations.

== See also ==
- Heidegger and Nazism
