= Georg Stenger =

German philosopher and university teacher

Philosophical work
- Era: Contemporary philosophy
- Region: Western philosophy
- School: Continental
- Main interests: Interculturality; Intercultural philosophy Heidegger's philosophy

Georg Stenger is a German philosopher and professor and chair of the department of philosophy at the University of Vienna. He is known for his works on structural ontology, intercultural philosophy, Heidegger's philosophy and also his contributions to Heidegger Gesamtausgabe. Stenger is the president of Society of Intercultural Philosophy.

== Works ==
- Georg Stenger: Interkulturelles Denken - Eine neue Herausforderung für die Philosophie. Ein Diskussionsbericht, in: Philosophisches Jahrbuch 1996, 90-103.323-338
- Georg Stenger: Philosophie der Interkulturalität. Erfahrung und Welten. Eine phänomenologische Studie. Freiburg i. Br. / München: Karl Alber 2006. ISBN 978-3-495-48136-3
- mit Alfred Denker, Shunsuke Kadowaki, Georg Stenger und Holger Zaborowski: Heidegger und das ostasiatische Denken. (= Heidegger-Jahrbuch. Band 7). Verlag Karl Alber, Freiburg i. Br./ München 2013, ISBN 978-3-495-45707-8.
- M. A. C. Otto: Gesang im Nebel. In: Philosophie der Struktur – "Fahrzeug" der Zukunft? Festschrift für Heinrich Rombach. Hrsg. v. Georg Stenger und Margarete Röhrig. Verlag Karl Alber, Freiburg i. Br. / München 1995. ISBN 978-3-495-47820-2. S. 141-149

== See also ==
- Intercultural relations
- Cross-cultural communication
- Taha Abdurrahman
