= Elisabeth Schiemann =

German geneticist and botanist (1881–1972)

- Born: 15 August 1881; Viljandi, Livonia, Russian Empire
- Died: 3 January 1972 (aged 90); Berlin, Germany
- Resting place: Dahlem, Berlin
- Occupations: Geneticist; botanist; researcher
- Known for: Activities with the German Resistance
- Honours: Order of Merit of the Federal Republic of Germany; Botanical Society of France; German National Academy of Sciences Leopoldina

Academic background
- Education: University of Berlin (1912)

Elisabeth Schiemann (German: [eˈliːzabɛt ˈʃiːman]; 15 August 1881 – 3 January 1972) was a German geneticist, crop researcher and resistance fighter in the Third Reich.

== Background and education ==
Elisabeth Schiemann was born in Viljandi, Estonia, at the time a part of the Governorate of Livonia in the Russian Empire. Her father was the historian Theodor Schiemann; from 1887 she lived in Berlin. She was part of the first generation of women in Germany who were permitted to study and pursue independent careers as academics, although initially in a limited capacity.

She attended a seminar for teachers and stayed on in Paris for several years to study language. Subsequently, she worked for a few years as a teacher in a girls' school. From 1908 she studied at the University of Berlin and earned her doctorate there in 1912 with a thesis on mutations in Aspergillus niger; her supervisor was Erwin Baur.

== Academic career ==
From 1914 to 1931 she was senior assistant at the Institute for Genetics at the Agricultural University of Berlin, of which Baur was director. She habilitated in 1924 with a thesis on the genetics of winter and spring barley. As a Privatdozentin at the Agricultural University, she lectured on seed science and reproductive biology although her actual field of research was the history of cultivated plants.

From 1931 to 1943 Schiemann worked as a visiting scientist at the Berlin-Dahlem Botanical Institute. During this period she became interested in archaeological research on crop cultivation. Her book Entstehung der Kulturplanzen (Origin of cultivated plants) was published in 1932, becoming a reference work in the field of cultivated plants and bringing her international recognition. In 1943 she published a further fundamental treatise about her new research under the same name in the journal Ergebnisse der Biologie (Advances in Biology). In 1931, she also became a faculty member at Berlin University. She openly spoke out against the so-called racial politics of National Socialism and its pseudo-Darwinism, against the persecution of Jews and abolition of the multi-party system. This put her in conflict with the regime and in 1940 after a denunciation and dispute over her teaching position, her Venia legendi was withdrawn.

In 1943, Elisabeth Schiemann took over management of an independent crop history department at the newly founded Kaiser-Wilhelm-Institut für Kulturpflanzenforschung (Kaiser-Wilhelm Institute of Crop Plant Research; now the Leibniz-Institut für Pflanzengenetik und Kulturpflanzenforschung, a division of the Leibniz Association) in the Tuttenhof section of Vienna; her department remained in Berlin. In 1946 she received a professorship at the reopened Berlin University, teaching genetics and crop history there until 1949. She was able to continue her research in makeshift premises. In 1948 the crop history department together with its counterpart in Berlin-Dahlem, still called Kaiser-Wilhelm Institute, was transferred to the newly founded Deutsche Forschungshochschule (German Research University); after this was dissolved in 1953, Schiemann continued to direct the department as an independent research centre for the Max Planck Society until her retirement in 1956, when the department was disbanded.

In 1946, six women at the University of Berlin became professors (out of a total of 300 professors). They were Schiemann, theologian philosopher Liselotte Richter, Slavic languages expert Margarete Woltner and medical professors Auguste Hoffmann, Elisabeth Nau, and Dean Else Knake. Between 1948 and 1951, all but one were compelled to leave the university because of political circumstances; only Richter retained her professorship until her retirement.

=== Honours ===
Elisabeth Schiemann received several awards for her scientific work. In 1953 she became a Scientific Member of the Max Planck Society (as the first scientist since 1945). In 1945 she received the Cross of Merit (Officer's Cross) of the Order of Merit of the Federal Republic of Germany. In the same year she became an honorary member of the Société botanique de France, in 1956 a member of the Leopoldina in Halle. In 1959, Leopoldina awarded her the Darwin Plaque (as the only woman among 18 scientists). In 1962, she received an honorary doctorate from the Agricultural faculty of Technische Universität Berlin: the first woman to receive this honour. In 2003, Falkenberg (Berlin) named a street after her: Elisabeth-Schiemann-Strasse.

== Resistance activities ==
Elisabeth Schiemann actively spoke up for those persecuted by the Nazi regime. She belonged to a network of sympathetic women which included among others the resistance member and pastor Elisabeth Schmitz. Alongside Schmitz, Elisabeth and her sister Gertrude were members of the Confessing Church in Dahlem (Berlin).

Elisabeth Schiemann dedicated herself to writing to ministers and pastors of the Confessing Church, urging them to be more outspoken in their condemnation of the Nazi regime, and to governmental ministers protesting treatment of emigrating Jews. She helped sisters Valery and Andrea Wolfstein evade deportation and defended Jewish colleagues attending scientific symposia.

She maintained a close friendship with the physicist Lise Meitner who had escaped in July 1938. This is evidenced by an extensive, decades-long, largely preserved correspondence. After the end of World War II, there was a conflict between the pair about the motives/causes of the Nazi regime, the lack of widespread resistance against the regime amongst the German population, about the future of a new Germany and the importance of dealing with the Nazi past.

On 16 December 2014, Yad Vashem honored her as Righteous Among the Nations for her work to save Jews during the Holocaust.

== Death ==
Schiemann died in Berlin, and is buried in the churchyard of the village church of Dahlem, where she had been a parishioner.
