= Society of Intercultural Philosophy =

Philosophical association based in Cologne, Germany

Society of Intercultural Philosophy (SIP) (German: Gesellschaft für Interkulturelle Philosophie (GIP)) is a non-profit association dealing with intercultural philosophy based in Cologne. It was founded in 1992 and now has members all over the world. Claudia Bickmann and Georg Stenger are the presidents of the society.

== Sources ==
- – Es geht um Veröffentlichung zum Thema Interkulturelle Philosophie
- – Es handelt sich um die wissen. Reihe Interkulturelle Bibliothek
- – Es handelt sich um eine wissen. Reihe zum Thema Interkulturelle Forschung
- – Es geht um unterschiedliche Themenfelder der Interkulturalität
- Wiener Gesellschaft für interkulturelle Philosophie (WiGiP)
- Polylog - Zeitschrift für Interkulturelles Philosophieren
- polylog – Forum for Intercultural Philosophy
- Interkulturelle Philosophie : Struktur – Gegenstand – Aufgabe (PDF; 214 kB)
