= Dieter Henrich =

German philosopher (1927–2022)

- Born: 5 January 1927; Marburg, Hesse-Nassau, Prussia, Weimar Republic
- Died: 17 December 2022 (aged 95); Munich, Bavaria, Germany

Education
- Education: University of Marburg; Goethe University Frankfurt; Heidelberg University (PhD, 1950)
- Thesis: Die Einheit der Wissenschaftslehre Max Webers (The Unity of Max Weber's Epistemology) (1950)
- Doctoral advisor: Hans-Georg Gadamer

Philosophical work
- Era: Contemporary philosophy
- Region: Western philosophy
- School: Continental philosophy Heidelberg school of philosophy of subjectivity
- Institutions: LMU Munich; Humboldt University of Berlin; Heidelberg University; Harvard University; Columbia University
- Doctoral students: Manfred Frank; Hans Friedrich Fulda; Panagiotis Kondylis
- Main interests: Philosophy of subjectivity and self-consciousness, history of philosophy, aesthetics
- Notable ideas: The epistemic self-relation; Fichte's original insight; Kantian fallacy

Signature
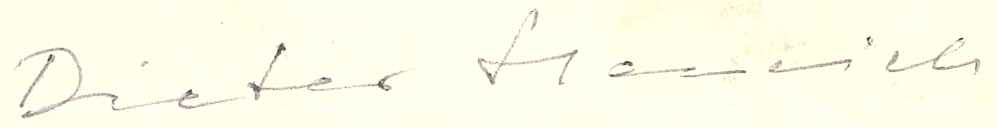

Dieter Henrich (5 January 1927 – 17 December 2022) was a German philosopher. A contemporary thinker in the tradition of German idealism, Henrich is considered "one of the most respected and frequently cited philosophers in Germany today", whose "extensive and highly innovative studies of German Idealism and his systematic analyses of subjectivity have significantly impacted on advanced German philosophical and theological debates."

== Biography ==
Henrich was born in Marburg, on 5 January 1927, the son of Hans Harry Henrich, who worked in survey services, and his wife Frieda née Blum. Because his three siblings died at early ages, he grew up a single child; his father died when he was eleven. Henrich earned his Abitur from the humanistic Gymnasium Philippinum in Marburg in 1946.

Henrich studied philosophy, history and sociology between 1946 and 1950 at Marburg, Frankfurt and Heidelberg. He completed his PhD dissertation at Heidelberg in 1950 under the supervision of Hans-Georg Gadamer. The thesis title was Die Einheit der Wissenschaftslehre Max Webers (The unity of Max Weber's epistemology). He wrote his habilitation in 1956, titled Selbstbewusstsein und Sittlichkeit. Henrich was professor at the Humboldt University of Berlin from 1960 to 1965, at the University of Heidelberg from 1965 to 1981, and at LMU Munich from 1981 to 1994, instructing generations of philosophers in standards of interpreting classical texts. He was also a visiting professor at universities in the United States, such as Harvard and Columbia.

Henrich died on 17 December 2022 at age 95.

== Philosophical work ==
In 1966, Henrich introduced the term Fichte's original insight (Fichtes ursprüngliche Einsicht) to describe Johann Gottlieb Fichte's idea that the self must already have some prior acquaintance with itself, independent of the act of self-reflection. Henrich's essay "Fichtes ursprüngliche Einsicht" (1966) is now regarded as the founding text of the Heidelberg school of philosophy of subjectivity (Heidelberger Schule). He noted that Fichte saw the transcendental subject as a primordial selfhood and identified its activity as prior to self-reflection. He also introduced the term Kantian fallacy to describe Immanuel Kant's attempt to ground the self in pure self-reflection, positing the moment of self-reflection as the original source of self-consciousness (see also pre-reflective self-consciousness). His thinking was focused on the mystery of self-consciousness. He pointed out that the evidence of self-consciousness was not really self-evident, but rather obscure, possibly the manifestation of a reason concealed in the clarity of self-consciousness and eluding thought ("die offenkundige Manifestation eines Grundes, der sich in der Klarheit des Selbstbewußtseins gleichsam verbirgt und dem Denken entzieht").

Henrich's 1973 lecture course on German idealism introduced contemporary currents in German philosophy to American audiences. Since then his lectures have been published as Between Kant and Hegel (2003), which show the continuity between German idealism and contemporary philosophical attitudes. Henrich introduced the idea that I-thoughts (what he also called "the epistemic self-relation" [Das wissende Selbstverhältnis]) imply a belief in the existence of a world of objects.

== Awards ==
- 1984: Member, Bayerische Akademie der Wissenschaften
- 1993: Foreign Honorary Member, American Academy of Arts and Sciences
- 1995: Friedrich-Hölderlin-Preis, University of Tübingen
- 1999: Honorary doctorate in theology of the University of Münster
- 2003: Hegel Prize of the City of Stuttgart
- 2002: Honorary doctorate in theology of the University of Marburg
- 2004: Internationaler Kant-Preis, ZEIT-Stiftung
- 2005: Honorary doctorate in philosophy of the University of Jena
- 2006: Deutscher Sprachpreis
- 2006: Bavarian Maximilian Order for Science and Art
- 2008: Dr. Leopold-Lucas-Preis, University of Tübingen
- 2008: Kuno-Fischer-Preis, Heidelberg University

== Selected works ==
- Henrich, Dieter (1952). Die Einheit der Wissenschaftslehre Max Webers (dissertation) (in German). Tübingen: J.C.B. Mohr. doi:10.11588/DIGLIT.52825.
- Hegel im Kontext. Frankfurt: Suhrkamp, 1971. ISBN 978-3-518-29538-0 OCLC 521501603
  - Henrich, Dieter (15 October 2018). "Beginning and Method of (the) Logic". S: Journal of the Circle for Lacanian Ideology Critique. 11: 31–48. ISSN 1874-9062.
- Der Grund im Bewußtsein. Untersuchungen zu Hölderlins Denken (1794/95). Stuttgart: Klett-Cotta, 1992. ISBN 3-608-91613-X (2. erw. Aufl. 2004)
- The Unity of Reason: Essays on Kant's Philosophy, Harvard University Press, 1994. ISBN 0-674-92905-5
- Versuch über Kunst und Leben. Subjektivität – Weltverstehen – Kunst. München: Carl Hanser, 2001. ISBN 3-446-19857-1
- Fixpunkte. Abhandlungen und Essays zur Theorie der Kunst. Frankfurt: Suhrkamp, 2003. ISBN 3-518-29210-2
- (with David S. Pacini) Between Kant and Hegel: Lectures on German Idealism. Harvard University Press, 2003. ISBN 0-674-00773-5
- Grundlegung aus dem Ich. Untersuchungen zur Vorgeschichte des Idealismus. Tübingen – Jena 1790–1794. Frankfurt: Suhrkamp, 2004. ISBN 3-518-58384-0
- Die Philosophie im Prozeß der Kultur. Frankfurt: Suhrkamp, 2006. ISBN 978-3-518-29412-3
- Endlichkeit und Sammlung des Lebens, Mohr Siebeck, 2009 ISBN 978-3-16-149948-7
- Furcht ist nicht in der Liebe. Philosophische Betrachtungen zu einem Satz des Evangelisten Johannes. Verlag Vittorio Klostermann, Frankfurt, 2022 ISBN 978-3-465-03418-6
