= Fusion of horizons =

Concept in epistemology

In the philosophy of Hans-Georg Gadamer, a fusion of horizons (German: Horizontverschmelzung) is the process through which the members of a hermeneutical dialogue establish the broader context within which they come to a shared understanding.

In phenomenology, a horizon refers to the context within which any meaningful presentation is contained. For Gadamer, we exist neither in closed horizons, nor within a horizon that is unique; we must reject both the assumption of absolute knowledge, that universal history can be articulated within a single horizon, and the assumption of objectivity, that we can "forget ourselves" in order to achieve an objective perspective of the other participant.

According to Gadamer, since it is not possible to totally remove oneself from one's own broader context, (e.g. the background, history, culture, gender, language, education, etc.) to an entirely different system of attitudes, beliefs and ways of thinking, in order to be able to gain an understanding from a conversation or dialogue about different cultures we must acquire "the right horizon of inquiry for the questions evoked by the encounter with tradition." through negotiation; in order to come to an agreement, the participants must establish a shared context through this "fusion" of their horizons.

== See also ==
- Horizon of expectation
- Perspectivism
- The View from Nowhere
