= Truth and Method =

1960 book by Hans-Georg Gadamer

- First edition
- Author: Hans-Georg Gadamer
- Original title: Wahrheit und Methode
- Language: German
- Subject: Hermeneutics
- Published: 1960
- Publication place: Germany
- Media type: Print (Hardcover and Paperback)

Truth and Method (German: Wahrheit und Methode) is a 1960 book by the philosopher Hans-Georg Gadamer, in which the author deploys the concept of "philosophical hermeneutics" as it is worked out in Martin Heidegger's Being and Time (1927). The book is considered Gadamer's major work.

== Summary ==
Gadamer draws heavily on the ideas of Romantic hermeneuticists such as Friedrich Schleiermacher and the work of later hermeneuticists such as Wilhelm Dilthey. He rejects as unachievable the goal of objectivity, and instead suggests that meaning is created through intersubjective communication.

Gadamer's philosophical project, as explained in Truth and Method, was to elaborate on the concept of "philosophical hermeneutics", which Heidegger in his Being and Time initiated but never dealt with at length. Gadamer's goal was to uncover the nature of human understanding. In the book Gadamer argued that "truth" and "method" were at odds with one another. He was critical of two approaches to the human sciences (Geisteswissenschaften). On the one hand, he was critical of modern approaches to humanities that modelled themselves on the natural sciences (and thus on rigorous scientific methods). On the other hand, he took issue with the traditional German approach to the humanities, represented for instance by Dilthey and Schleiermacher, which believed that correctly interpreting a text meant recovering the original intention of the author who wrote it.

In contrast to both of these positions, Gadamer argued that people have a 'historically effected consciousness' (wirkungsgeschichtliches Bewußtsein) and that they are embedded in the particular history and culture that shaped them. Thus interpreting a text involves a fusion of horizons (Horizontverschmelzung) where the scholar finds the ways that the text's history articulates with their own background. Truth and Method is not meant to be a programmatic statement about a new 'hermeneutic' method of interpreting texts. Gadamer intended Truth and Method to be a description of what we always do when we interpret things (even if we do not know it): "My real concern was and is philosophic: not what we do or what we ought to do, but what happens to us over and above our wanting and doing".

Importantly, as Gadamer puts it, in relation to his chapter "The hermeneutic circle and the problem of prejudice", "[t]he overcoming of all prejudices, this is the global demand of the Enlightenment, will itself prove to be a prejudice."

== Publication history ==
Truth and Method was published twice in English, and the revised edition is now considered authoritative. The German-language edition of Gadamer's Collected Works includes a volume in which Gadamer elaborates his argument and discusses the critical response to the book. Finally, Gadamer's essay on poet Paul Celan (entitled "Who Am I and Who Are You?") has been considered by many—including Heidegger and Gadamer himself—as a "second volume" or continuation of the argument in Truth and Method.

== Reception ==
Truth and Method is regarded as Gadamer's magnum opus, and has influenced many philosophers and sociologists, notably Jürgen Habermas. In reaction to Gadamer, the critic E. D. Hirsch reasserted a traditionalist approach to interpretation (following Dilthey and Schleiermacher), seeing the task of interpretation as consisting of reconstructing the intentions of the original author of a text. The philosopher Adolf Grünbaum criticized Truth and Method, maintaining that Gadamer misunderstood the methods of science, and made an incorrect contrast between the natural and the human sciences. The critic George Steiner writes that Gadamer's influential model of textual understanding is "developed explicitly out of Heidegger's concept and practice of language."
