= Erich Frank (philosopher) =

Erich Frank (6 June 1883 – 22 June 1949) was a German historian of philosophy.

== Life ==
Erich Frank was born on 6 June 1883 in Prague in Bohemia, Austria-Hungary. He was the son of the assimilated Jewish couple Aloys und Regina Frank. He studied old history and classics at the universities of Vienna, Freiburg, and Berlin before moving to the University of Heidelberg (1907–1910), where he explored philosophy under Heinrich Rickert and Wilhelm Windelband and where he later became a professor (1923–1928).

During World War I Frank had served as a soldier. In 1920 he published Wissen–Wollen–Glauben, thus creating, according to Eva Gossman, together with Karl 'Jaspers's Psychologie der Weltanschauungen the foundations of German existentialism'. In 1928 Erich Frank accepted a call to the chair vacated by Martin Heidegger at Marburg University.

After the Nazi takeover in 1933 and the establishment, in 1935, of the Law for the Restoration of the Professional Civil Service, Frank was banned from research and teaching, prohibited to publish, and briefly imprisoned in a concentration camp. Towards the end of 1938 he managed to escape to the United States via Holland. In the US he became a Rockefeller Foundation fellow in 1939, and in 1946 Visiting Professor of Philosophy at Bryn Mawr College. He applied successfully for U.S. citizenship and, in his final year, had an offer for a professorship at the University of Pennsylvania.

Frank was among the leading historians of philosophy and religion of his day. He focused in particular on the contradictions between philosophy and religiosity. While Jaspers and Heidegger counted him among their associates, Frank later 'came to question the subjective direction in which existentialist philosophy was developing.'

Frank died on 22 June 1949 in Amsterdam.

== Works ==
- Das Prinzip der dialektischen Synthesis und die Kantische Philosophie, Reuther & Reichard, Berlin 1911 (Kant-Studien, Ergänzungshefte 21).
- Plato und die sogenannten Pythagoreer. Ein Kapitel aus der Geschichte des griechischen Geistes, Niemeyer, Halle (Saale) 1923 [Nachdruck Darmstadt 1962].
- Wissen, Wollen, Glauben. Gesammelte Aufsätze zur Philosophiegeschichte und Existentialphilosophie, ed. Ludwig Edelstein, Artemis-Verlag, Zurich & Stuttgart 1955 (Erasmus-Bibliothek).

== See also ==
- Analogy
- Analogia entis
