= Friedrich Nietzsche Prize =

- Country: Germany
- Presented by: Saxony-Anhalt, Naumburg and Basel
- Hosted by: Friedrich Nietzsche Foundation (Naumburg an der Saale/Germany) Elisabeth Jenny Foundation (Riehen/Switzerland) City of Naumburg and the citizens' community of the city of Basel
- Reward: €15,000
- First award: 1996
- Website: www.nietzsche-gesellschaft.de/nietzsche-preis/

The Friedrich Nietzsche Prize or Friedrich-Nietzsche-Preis is a German literary award named after Friedrich Nietzsche and awarded by the state of Saxony-Anhalt. It was first awarded in 1996 for a German-language essayistic or philosophical work. The Friedrich Nietzsche Prize is endowed with 15,000 euros. It is awarded by the Prime Minister of Saxony-Anhalt on the basis of proposals by an international jury.

The Friedrich Nietzsche Prize is one of the most highly endowed awards in Germany, awarded exclusively for philosophical and essayistic achievements.

The International Friedrich Nietzsche Prize replaces the Friedrich Nietzsche Prize awarded by the state of Saxony-Anhalt between 1996 and 2012.

== Recipients ==
- 1996: Wolfgang Müller-Lauter, Berlin
- 1998: Curt Paul Janz, Basel
- 2000: Rüdiger Safranski, Berlin
- 2002: Marie-Luise Haase, Berlin and Michael Kohlenbach, Basel
- 2004: Durs Grünbein, Berlin
- 2006: Silvio Vietta, Hildesheim
- 2009: Ludger Lütkehaus, Freiburg
- 2012: Andreas Urs Sommer, Heidelberg
- 2015: Martin Walser, Überlingen
- 2017: Wolfram Groddeck, Zürich
- 2019: Ágnes Heller, New York / Budapest
- 2022: Bettina Stangneth, Hamburg
- 2024: Renate Reschke, Berlin
