= Hans-Georg Gadamer =

German philosopher (1900–2002)

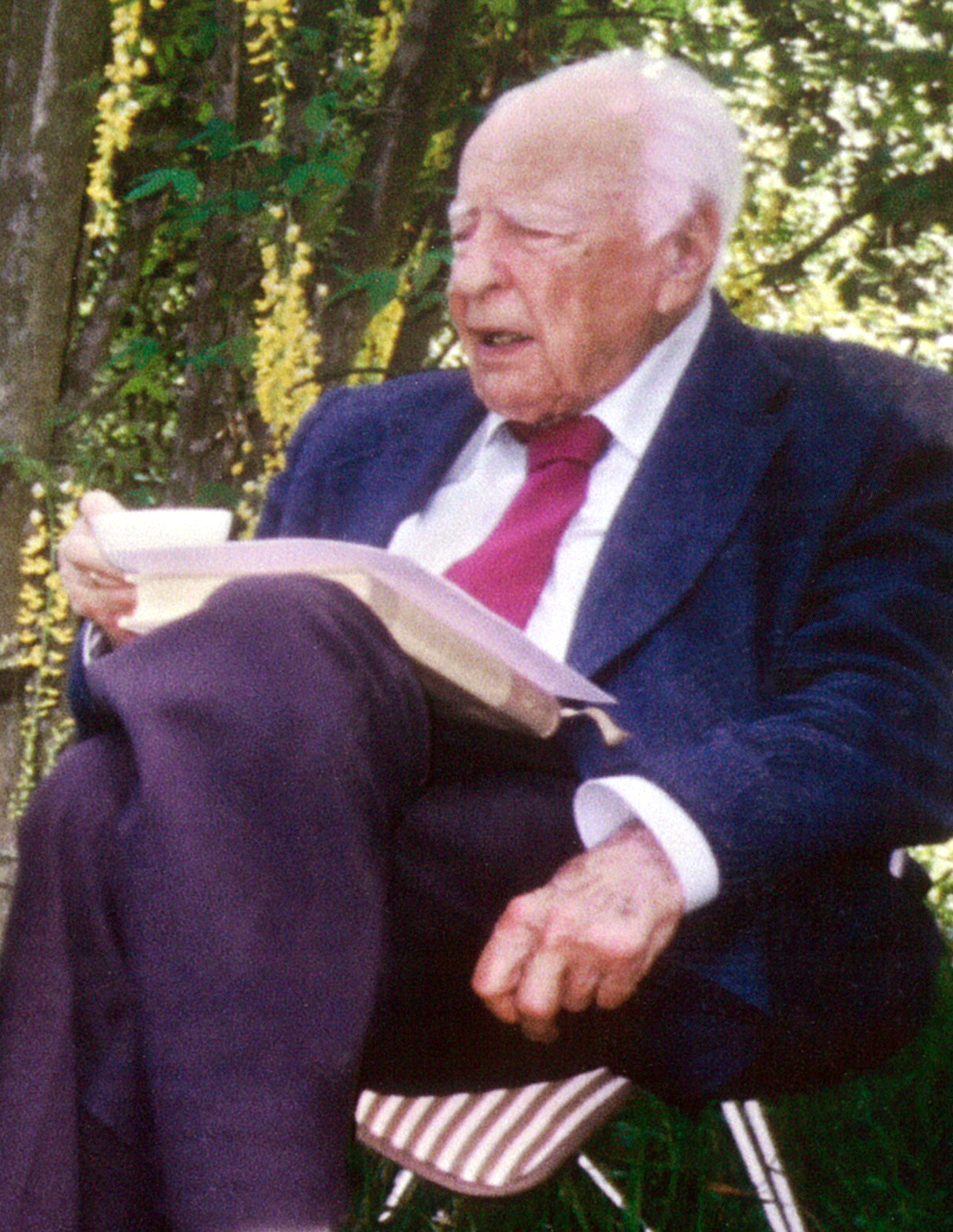
- Hans-Georg Gadamer, c. 2000
- Born: 11 February 1900; Marburg, Province of Hesse-Nassau, Kingdom of Prussia, German Empire
- Died: 13 March 2002 (aged 102); Heidelberg, Baden-Württemberg, Germany
- Spouses: Frida Kratz (m. 1923, divorced) Käte Lekebusch (m. 1950)
- Children: 1
- Father: Johannes Gadamer

Education
- Education: University of Breslau; University of Marburg
- Thesis: The Nature of Pleasure According to Plato's Dialogues (1922)
- Doctoral advisor: Paul Natorp
- Other advisors: Martin Heidegger; Nicolai Hartmann; Richard Hönigswald

Philosophical work
- Era: 20th-century philosophy
- Region: Western philosophy
- School: Continental philosophy Hermeneutics; Ontological hermeneutics Hermeneutic phenomenology
- Institutions: University of Marburg (1928–1938); Leipzig University (1938–1948); Goethe University Frankfurt (1948–1949); University of Heidelberg (1949–2002)
- Doctoral students: Hans Friedrich Fulda; Dieter Henrich; Otto Pöggeler
- Notable students: Joseph Cohen; Charles Guignon; Emilio Lledo; Gianni Vattimo
- Main interests: Metaphysics; epistemology; philosophy of language; aesthetics
- Notable ideas: Hermeneutics as practical philosophy; Historically-effected consciousness; Fusion of horizons

Hans-Georg Gadamer (/ˈɡɑːdəmər/; German: [ˈɡaːdamɐ]; 11 February 1900 – 13 March 2002) was a German philosopher of the continental tradition best known for his work on hermeneutics, including Truth and Method (Wahrheit und Methode, 1960), which argues that understanding is shaped by history, language, and dialogue rather than by the application of objective method.

== Life ==
=== Family and early life ===
Gadamer was born in Marburg, Germany, the son of Johannes Gadamer (1867–1928), a pharmaceutical chemistry professor who later also served as the rector of the University of Marburg. He was raised a Protestant Christian. Gadamer resisted his father's urging to take up the natural sciences and became more and more interested in the humanities. His mother, Emma Karoline Johanna Gewiese (1869–1904) died of diabetes while Hans-Georg was four years old, and he later noted that this may have had an effect on his decision not to pursue scientific studies. Jean Grondin describes Gadamer as finding in his mother "a poetic and almost religious counterpart to the iron fist of his father". Gadamer did not serve during World War I for reasons of ill health and similarly was exempted from serving during World War II due to polio.

=== Education ===
Gadamer studied classics and philosophy in the University of Breslau under Richard Hönigswald, but soon moved back to the University of Marburg to study with the neo-Kantian philosophers Paul Natorp (his doctoral thesis advisor) and Nicolai Hartmann. He defended his dissertation The Essence of Pleasure in Plato's Dialogues (Das Wesen der Lust nach den Platonischen Dialogen) in 1922.

Shortly thereafter, Gadamer moved to Freiburg University and began studying with Martin Heidegger, who was then a promising young scholar who had not yet received a professorship. He became close to Heidegger, and when Heidegger received a position at Marburg, Gadamer followed him there, where he became one of a group of students such as Leo Strauss, Karl Löwith, and Hannah Arendt. It was Heidegger's influence that gave Gadamer's thought its distinctive cast and led him away from the earlier neo-Kantian influences. Gadamer studied Aristotle both under Edmund Husserl and under Heidegger.

=== Early career ===
Gadamer habilitated in 1929 and spent most of the early 1930s lecturing in Marburg. Unlike Heidegger, who joined the Nazi Party in May 1933 and continued as a member until the party was dissolved following World War II, Gadamer was silent on Nazism, and he was not politically active during Nazi rule. Gadamer did not join the Nazis, and he did not serve in the army because of the polio he had contracted in 1922. He joined the National Socialist Teachers League in August 1933. In 1933 he signed the Vow of allegiance of the Professors of the German Universities and High-Schools to Adolf Hitler and the National Socialistic State.

In April 1937, after some rubber stamping at the National Socialist German Lecturers League, Gadamer became a temporary professor at Marburg replacing Erich Frank, who had lost his chair on account of the Nazi Civil Service Law. In 1938, Gadamer received a professorship at Leipzig University. During World War II he contributed to Aktion Ritterbusch humanities' support of the war effort.

From an SS-point of view, Gadamer was classified as neither supportive nor disapproving in the "SD-Dossiers über Philosophie-Professoren" (i.e. SD-files concerning philosophy professors) that had been set up by the SS-Security-Service (SD). In 1946, American occupation forces found him to be untainted by Nazism; Gadamer was named rector of the university.

The level of Gadamer's involvement with the Nazis has been disputed in the works of Richard Wolin, Geoff Waite, and Teresa Orozco. In Radio Nietzsche, or, How to Fall Short of Philosophy Waite finds Nietzschean elitist esotericism to be the proper tradition to locate Gadamer's engagement in—"wherever people believed in gradations of rank and not in equality and equal rights." Orozco alleges, with reference to his published works, that Gadamer's support for Nazism was stronger than scholars had supposed. Gadamer scholars have rejected her assertions: Jean Grondin has said that Orozco is engaged in a "witch-hunt" while Donatella Di Cesare said that "the archival material on which Orozco bases her argument is actually quite negligible". Both, Di Cesare and Grondin, have argued that there is no trace of antisemitism in Gadamer's work, and that Gadamer maintained friendships with Jews and provided shelter for nearly two years for the philosopher Jacob Klein in 1933 and 1934. Gadamer had also reduced his contact with Heidegger during the Nazi era.

=== At Heidelberg ===
After the war Gadamer left for West Germany, accepting first a position in Goethe University Frankfurt and then the succession of Karl Jaspers as the philosophy chair in the University of Heidelberg in 1949, retiring in 1968. He remained in this position, as emeritus, until his death in 2002 at the age of 102. He was also an Editorial Advisor of the journal Dionysius. It was during this time that he completed his magnum opus, Truth and Method (1960), and engaged in his famous debate with Jürgen Habermas over the possibility of transcending history and culture in order to find a truly objective position from which to critique society. The debate was inconclusive, but marked the beginning of warm relations between the two men. It was Gadamer who secured Habermas's first professorship in the University of Heidelberg.

In 1968, Gadamer invited Tomonobu Imamichi for lectures at Heidelberg, but their relationship became very cool after Imamichi alleged that Heidegger had taken his concept of Dasein out of Okakura Kakuzo's concept of das in-der-Welt-sein (the being in the world) expressed in The Book of Tea, which Imamichi's teacher had offered to Heidegger in 1919, after having followed lessons with him the year before. Imamichi and Gadamer renewed contact four years later during an international congress.

In 1981, Gadamer attempted to engage with Jacques Derrida at a conference in Paris but it proved less enlightening because the two thinkers had little in common. A last meeting between Gadamer and Derrida was held at the Stift of Heidelberg in July 2001, coordinated by Derrida's students Joseph Cohen and Raphael Zagury-Orly. This meeting marked, in many ways, a turn in their philosophical encounter. After Gadamer's death, Derrida called their failure to find common ground one of the worst debacles of his life and expressed, in the main obituary for Gadamer, his great personal and philosophical respect. Richard J. Bernstein said that "[a] genuine dialogue between Gadamer and Derrida has never taken place. This is a shame because there are crucial and consequential issues that arise between hermeneutics and deconstruction".

=== Honorary doctorates ===
Gadamer received honorary doctorates from the University of Bamberg, the University of Wrocław, Boston College, Charles University in Prague, Hamilton College, the University of Leipzig, the University of Marburg (1999) the University of Ottawa, Saint Petersburg State University (2001), the University of Tübingen and University of Washington.

=== Death ===
On 11 February 2000, the University of Heidelberg celebrated Gadamer's 100th birthday with a ceremony and conference. Gadamer's last academic engagement was in the summer of 2001, at the age of 101, at an annual symposium on hermeneutics organized by two of his American students. On 13 March 2002, Gadamer died at Heidelberg's University Clinic at the age of 102. He is buried in the Köpfel cemetery in Ziegelhausen.

== Work ==
=== Philosophical hermeneutics and Truth and Method ===
Gadamer's philosophical project, as explained in Truth and Method, was to elaborate on the concept of "philosophical hermeneutics", which Heidegger initiated but never dealt with at length. Gadamer's goal was to uncover the nature of human understanding. In Truth and Method, Gadamer argued that "truth" and "method" were at odds with one another. For Gadamer, "the experience of art is exemplary in its provision of truths that are inaccessible by scientific methods, and this experience is projected to the whole domain of human sciences." He was critical of two approaches to the human sciences (Geisteswissenschaften). On the one hand, he was critical of modern approaches to humanities that modeled themselves on the natural sciences, which simply sought to "objectively" observe and analyze texts and art. On the other hand, he took issue with the traditional German approaches to the humanities, represented for instance by Friedrich Schleiermacher and Wilhelm Dilthey, who believed that meaning, as an object, could be found within a text through a particular process that allowed for a connection with the author's thoughts that led to the creation of a text (Schleiermacher), or the situation that led to an expression of human inner life (Dilthey).

However, Gadamer argued meaning and understanding are not objects to be found through certain methods, but are inevitable phenomena. Hermeneutics is not a process in which an interpreter finds a particular meaning, but "a philosophical effort to account for understanding as an ontological—the ontological—process of man." Thus, Gadamer is not giving a prescriptive method on how to understand, but rather he is working to examine how understanding, whether of texts, artwork, or experience, is possible at all. Gadamer intended Truth and Method to be a description of what we always do when we interpret things (even if we do not know it): "My real concern was and is philosophic: not what we do or what we ought to do, but what happens to us over and above our wanting and doing".

As a result of Martin Heidegger's temporal analysis of human existence, Gadamer argued that people have a so-called historically affected consciousness (wirkungsgeschichtliches Bewußtsein), and that they are embedded in the particular history and culture that shaped them. However the historical consciousness is not an object over and against our existence, but "a stream in which we move and participate, in every act of understanding." Therefore, people do not come to any given thing without some form of preunderstanding established by this historical stream. The tradition in which an interpreter stands establishes "prejudices" that affect how he or she will make interpretations. For Gadamer, these prejudices are not something that hinders our ability to make interpretations, but are both integral to the reality of being, and "are the basis of our being able to understand history at all." Gadamer criticized Enlightenment thinkers for harboring a "prejudice against prejudices".

For Gadamer, interpreting a text involves a fusion of horizons (Horizontverschmelzung). Both the text and the interpreter find themselves within a particular historical tradition, or "horizon". Each horizon is expressed through the medium of language, and both text and interpreter belong to and participate in history and language. This "belongingness" to language is the common ground between interpreter and text that makes understanding possible. As an interpreter seeks to understand a text, a common horizon emerges. This fusion of horizons does not mean the interpreter now fully understands some kind of objective meaning, but is "an event in which a world opens itself to him." The result is a deeper understanding of the subject matter.

Gadamer further explains the hermeneutical experience as a dialogue. To justify this, he uses Plato's dialogues as a model for how we are to engage with written texts. To be in conversation, one must take seriously "the truth claim of the person with whom one is conversing." Further, each participant in the conversation relates to one another insofar as they belong to the common goal of understanding one another. Ultimately, for Gadamer, the most important dynamic of conversation as a model for the interpretation of a text is "the give-and-take of question and answer." In other words, the interpretation of a given text will change depending on the questions the interpreter asks of the text. The "meaning" emerges not as an object that lies in the text or in the interpreter, but rather an event that results from the interaction of the two.

Truth and Method was published twice in English, and the revised edition is now considered authoritative. The German-language edition of Gadamer's Collected Works includes a volume in which Gadamer elaborates his argument and discusses the critical response to the book. Finally, Gadamer's essay on Celan (entitled "Who Am I and Who Are You?") has been considered by many—including Heidegger and Gadamer himself—as a "second volume" or continuation of the argument in Truth and Method.

==== Contributions to communication ethics ====
Gadamer's Truth and Method has become an authoritative work in the communication ethics field, spawning several prominent ethics theories and guidelines. The most profound of these is the formulation of the dialogic coordinates, a standard set of prerequisite communication elements necessary for inciting dialogue. Adhering to Gadamer's theories regarding bias, communicators can better initiate dialogic transaction, allowing biases to merge and promote mutual understanding and learning.

=== Other works ===
Gadamer also added philosophical substance to the notion of human health. In The Enigma of Health, Gadamer explored what it means to heal, as a patient and a provider. In this work the practice and art of medicine are thoroughly examined, as is the inevitability of any cure.

In addition to his work in hermeneutics, Gadamer is also well known for a long list of publications on Greek philosophy. Indeed, while Truth and Method became central to his later career, much of Gadamer's early life centered on studying Greek thinkers, Plato and Aristotle specifically. In the Italian introduction to Truth and Method, Gadamer said that his work on Greek philosophy was "the best and most original part" of his career. His book Plato's Dialectical Ethics looks at the Philebus dialogue through the lens of phenomenology and the philosophy of Martin Heidegger.

== Prizes and awards ==
- 1971: Pour le Mérite and the Reuchlin Prize
- 1972: Great Cross of Merit with Star of the Order of Merit of the Federal Republic of Germany
- 1979: Sigmund Freud Prize for scientific prose and Hegel Prize
- 1986: Karl Jaspers Prize
- 1990: Great Cross of Merit with Star and Sash of the Order of Merit of the Federal Republic of Germany
- 1993: Grand Cross of the Order of Merit of the Federal Republic of Germany
- 12 January 1996: appointed an honorary member of the Saxon Academy of Sciences in Leipzig

=== Honorary doctorates ===
- 1995: University of Wrocław
- 1996: University of Leipzig
- 1999: Philipps-University Marburg

== Bibliography ==
- Truth and Method. 1st English ed., 1975, trans. by W, Glen-Doepel, ed. by John Cumming and Garret Barden.
- Hegel's Dialectic: Five Hermeneutical Studies. Trans. P. Christopher Smith. New Haven, CT: Yale University Press, 1976.
- Dialogue and Dialectic: Eight Hermeneutical Studies on Plato. Trans. and ed. by P. Christopher Smith. New Haven, CT: Yale University Press, 1980.
- The Idea of the Good in Platonic-Aristotelian Philosophy. Trans. P. Christopher Smith. New Haven, CT: 1986.
- The Beginning of Philosophy. Trans. Rod Coltman. Continuum, 1998.
- Gadamer on Celan: 'Who Am I and Who Are You?' and Other Essays. By Hans-Georg Gadamer. Trans. and ed. Richard Heinemann and Bruce Krajewski. Albany, NY: SUNY Press, 1997.
- Heidegger's Ways. Trans. John W. Stanley. New York: SUNY Press, 1994.
- Literature and Philosophy in Dialogue: Essays in German Literary Theory. Trans. Robert H. Paslick. New York: SUNY Press, 1993.
- Philosophical Apprenticeships. Cambridge, MA: MIT Press, 1985 (Gadamer's memoirs, translated by Robert R. Sullivan.)
- The Enigma of Health: The Art of Healing in a Scientific Age. Trans. John Gaiger and Richard Walker. Oxford: Polity Press, 1996.
- Philosophical Hermeneutics. Trans. and ed. by David Linge. Berkeley: University of California Press, 1976.
- Plato's "Parmenides" and Its Influence. Dionysius, Volume VII (1983): 3–16
- Reason in the Age of Science. Trans. by Frederick Lawrence. Cambridge, MA: MIT Press, 1981.
- The Relevance of the Beautiful and Other Essays. Trans. N. Walker. ed. R. Bernasconi, Cambridge: Cambridge University Press, 1986.
- Praise of Theory. Trans. Chris Dawson. New Haven: Yale University Press, 1998.

== See also ==
- Gadamer–Derrida debate
- Limit situation
- North American Society for Philosophical Hermeneutics

== Works cited ==
- Di Cesare, Donatella (2007). Gadamer: A Philosophical Portrait. Translated by Keane, Niall. Bloomington, IN: Indiana University Press. ISBN 978-0-25300-763-6.
- Gonzales, Francisco J. (2006). "Dialectic and Dialogue in the Hermeneutics of Paul Ricouer and H.G. Gadamer". Continental Philosophy Review. 39 (1): 313–345. doi:10.1007/s11007-006-9031-4. S2CID 170800798.
- Grondin, Jean (2003). Hans-Georg Gadamer: A Biography. Translated by Weinsheimer, Joel. New Haven, CT: Yale University Press. ISBN 978-0-30009-841-9.
- Orozco, Teresa (1995). Platonische Gewalt: Gadamers politische Hermeneutik der NS-Zeit (in German). Hamburg; Berlin: Argument Verlag. ISBN 978-3-88619-240-3.
- Palmer, Richard (1969). Hermeneutics: Interpretation Theory in Schleiermacher, Dilthey, Heidegger, and Gadamer. Evanston, IL: Northwestern University Press. ISBN 978-0-81010-459-4.
- Schleiermacher, Friedrich D.E.; Wojcik, Jan; Haas, Roland (1978). "The Hermeneutics: Outline of the 1819 Lectures". New Literary History. 10 (1): 1–16. doi:10.2307/468302. JSTOR 468302.
