= Peus =

Peus is a surname. Notable people with the surname include:

- Busso Peus (1908–1979), German jurist and politician
- Friedrich-Carl Peus (1871–1950), German jurist and politician
- Fritz Peus (1904–1978), German entomologist
- Hugo Peus (1809–1898), German jurist and politician
- H. Busso Peus (1839–1893), German jurist and politician
