= Hegel-Studien =

Academic journal focusing on the philosophy of Hegel

- Discipline: Philosophy
- Language: English, French, German
- Edited by: Brady Bowman, Birgit Sandkaulen

Publication details
- History: 1961–present
- Publisher: Felix Meiner Verlag (Germany)
- Frequency: Annually
- Impact factor: 0.2 (2023)

Standard abbreviations
- ISO 4: Hegel-Stud.

Indexing
- ISSN: 0073-1587
- LCCN: 65056520
- JSTOR: 00731587
- OCLC no.: 596118912

Links
- Journal homepage

Hegel-Studien (Hegel Studies) is an annual German peer-reviewed academic journal focusing on the philosophy of Georg Wilhelm Friedrich Hegel. It was established in 1961 in cooperation with the Hegel Commission of the German Research Foundation (Deutsche Forschungsgemeinschaft) and in close connection with the historical-critical edition of Hegel's Gesammelte Werke (Hegel’s Complete Works). The journal publishes articles predominantly in German, but also in English and French. It is published by Felix Meiner Verlag.

== Contents ==
Since 2014, the journal is also open to other authors and debates in classical German philosophy and offers a forum for more systematically oriented contributions, insofar as this promises a significant gain for the examination of the epoch around 1800 and in reference to current discussions.

Volumes are divided into three sections: "Abhandlungen" (Treatises), "Buchkritik" (Book review), and "Bibliographie" (Bibliography). Submitted articles are subjected to (double-blind peer review).

=== Ongoing bibliography ===
The ongoing bibliography (fortlaufende Bibliographie) seeks to cover as much as possible of the literature on Hegel that has not appeared independently (essays from journals, anthologies, etc.) and to make it known by means of brief summaries of its contents. They are made available free of charge to interested scholars.

== Editors ==
Friedhelm Nicolin and Otto Pöggeler were the editors-in-chief up to and including volume 35 (2000). In 1999, the publishing change to Felix Meiner Verlag was completed. Beginning with volume 36 (2001), they were succeeded by Walter Jaeschke and Ludwig Siep. From volume 47 (2014) onwards, Birgit Sandkaulen and Michael Quante took over. Since volume 56, Sandkaulen, Brady Bowman along with Dina Emundts are the editors-in-chief.

== Abstracting and indexing ==
The journal is or was abstracted and indexed in the Arts & Humanities Citation Index, Current Contents/Arts & Humanities, EBSCO databases, International Bibliography of Periodical Literature, Modern Language Association Database, and Scopus (2002–2006 and 2009–2010). According to the Journal Citation Reports, the journal has a 2023 impact factor of 0.2.

== See also ==
- Studia Hegeliana
- Hegel Bulletin
- Hegel-Jahrbuch
- The Owl of Minerva
- Hegel-Archiv
