= Johannes-Georg Schülein =

Philosophy professor

Johannes-Georg Schülein (born 1979) is a professor of philosophy at Ruhr University Bochum.

== Life and work ==
in 2014 Schülein received his PhD under Birgit Sandkaulen at the Ruhr University Bochum.

From September 2025 he has been the Academic Chief Councillor at the Hegel-Archiv.

== Publications ==
=== Monographs ===
- Schülein, Johannes-Georg (1 January 1993). Metaphysik und ihre Kritik bei Hegel und Derrida (in German). FELIX MEINER VERLAG. doi:10.28937/978-3-7873-2982-3. ISBN 978-3-7873-2982-3.

=== Edited volumes ===
- Corti, Luca; Schülein, Johannes-Georg, eds. (2023). "Life, Organisms, and Human Nature". Studies in German Idealism. 22. doi:10.1007/978-3-031-41558-6. ISBN 978-3-031-41557-9. ISSN 1571-4764.
- Corti, Luca; Schülein, Johannes-Georg (2022). Nature and Naturalism in Classical German Philosophy (1 ed.). New York: Routledge. doi:10.4324/9781003092056. ISBN 978-1-003-09205-6.
- Koch, Oliver; Schülein, Johannes-Georg, eds. (31 December 2019). Subjekt und Person (in German). FELIX MEINER VERLAG. doi:10.28937/978-3-7873-3772-9. ISBN 978-3-7873-3772-9.
- Koehn, Elisabeth Johanna, ed. (2011). Andersheit um 1800: Figuren - Theorien - Darstellungsformen. doi:10.30965/9783846751183. ISBN 978-3-8467-5118-3.
