= Internationale Hegel-Vereinigung =

German scholarly and learned society

- Formation: 1962
- Founder: Hans-Georg Gadamer, Alexandre Koyré, Joachim Ritter
- Type: Learned Society
- Purpose: “promote the study of Hegel's philosophy”
- Location: Germany
- Origins: 1962-present
- Members: 250
- President: Dina Emundts
- Key people: Stephen Houlgate; Julia Peters; Gunnar Hindrichs; Andreja Novakovic
- Publication: As supplements of Hegel-Studien
- Website: https://hegelvereinigung.org/

The Internationale Hegel-Vereinigung (International Hegel Association) is a non-profit organization, founded in 1962 by Hans-Georg Gadamer, Alexandre Koyré, Joachim Ritter and others, to provide an alternative to the Internationale Hegel-Gesellschaft, which was still strictly Marxist-Leninist in orientation at the time.

== Purpose ==
Its mission is to promote the study of G.W.F. Hegel's philosophy on at least two different fronts: (1) Hegel's system and its parts; and (2) Hegel's philosophical beginnings and history as it leads up to modern theory.

== Activities ==
The International Hegel Association organizes smaller meetings at regular intervals to discuss different topics of Hegel's philosophy, as well as an International Congress every six years, designing the most comprehensive international participation possible.

The International Hegel Association has more than 250 members worldwide.

Since 1967, the Hegel Association has been awarding the Hegel Prize of the city of Stuttgart every three years to personalities who have rendered outstanding services to the development of the humanities.

=== Periodical ===
The periodical publication of the International Hegel Association appeared until 1980 as a supplement of the Hegel Studien and after 1980 has been published independently by the Klett Cotta Publishing House, Stuttgart. Since 2013 it has been published by the publishing house Vittorio Klostermann, Frankfurt am Main.

== List of presidents ==
On March, 2007, Professor Axel Honneth (Frankfurt) became the president of the association. Since 2017 Dina Emundts been the president of the Association.

- Dieter Henrich (1970-1987)
- Hans Friedrich Fulda (1987-1996)
- Rüdiger Bubner (1996-2007)
- Axel Honneth (2007-2017)
- Dina Emundts (2017-)

== See also ==
- Hegel Society of Great Britain
- Hegel Society of America
- Internationale Hegel-Gesellschaft
- Centre de recherche et de documentation sur Hegel
- Hegel-Archiv
