= Lectures on the Philosophy of World History =

1822–1830 lecture series by Hegel

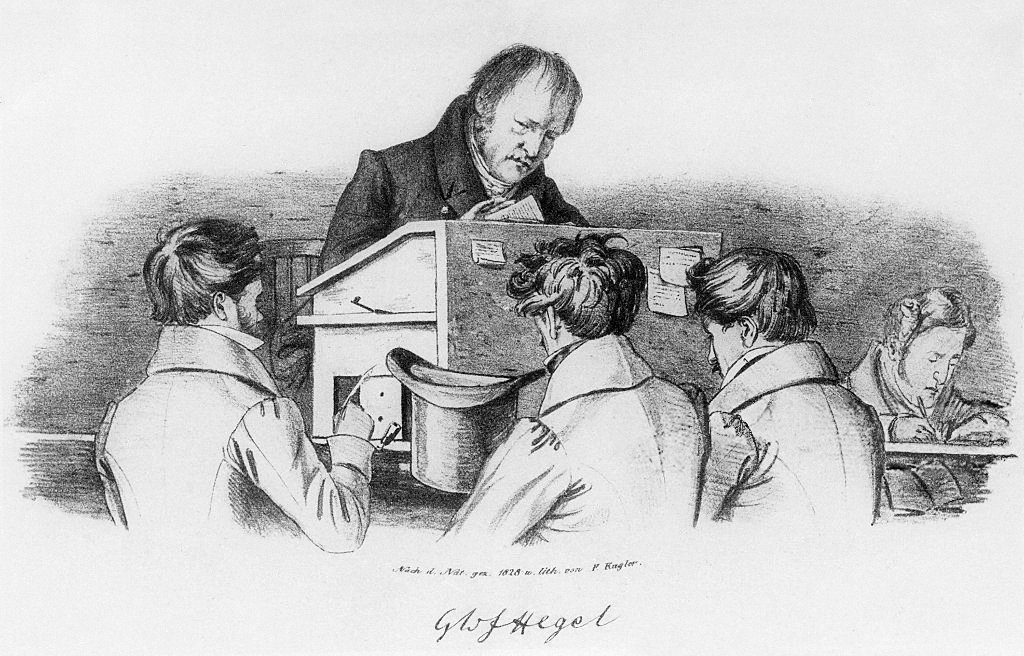
Lithograph of Georg Wilhelm Friedrich Hegel at the Berlin University in 1828, giving a lecture

Lectures on the Philosophy of World History (or simply Lectures on the Philosophy of History; German: Vorlesungen über die Philosophie der Weltgeschichte) is a work by Georg Wilhelm Friedrich Hegel (1770–1831), originally given as lectures at the University of Berlin in 1822, 1828, and 1830. It presents world history in terms of the Hegelian philosophy in order to show that history follows the dictates of reason and that the natural progress of history is due to the outworking of absolute spirit.

The text was originally published in 1837 by the editor Eduard Gans, six years after Hegel's death, utilizing Hegel's own lecture notes as well as those found that were written by his students. A second German edition was compiled by Hegel's son, Karl, in 1840. A third German edition, edited by Georg Lasson, was published in 1917.

== Themes ==
=== Written history ===
Hegel begins by distinguishing three methods or modes of doing history: Original History, Reflective History and Philosophical History. To Original and Philosophic histories, Hegel assigns a single definition; on Reflective History, Hegel offers four sub-definitions.

Original history is like that of Herodotus and Thucydides, these are almost contemporaneous writings limited to deeds, events and states of society which they had before their very eyes and whose culture they shared. Hegel posits the goal of Original history to transfer "what was passing in the world around them, to the realm of representative intellect. An external phenomenon is thus translated into an internal conception. In the same way, the poet operates upon the material supplied him by his emotions; projecting it into an image for the conceptive faculty."

Reflective history is written at some temporal distance from the events or history considered. However, for Hegel, this form of history has a tendency to impose the cultural prejudices and ideas of the historians' era upon the history over which the historian reflects.

Hegel's own project in these lectures is what he calls philosophical history. He maintains that with philosophical history the historian must bracket his own preconceptions and go and find the overall sense and the driving ideas out of the very matter of the history considered.

=== Spirit ===
Hegel's lectures on the philosophy of world history are often used to introduce students to Hegel's philosophy, in part because Hegel's sometimes difficult style is muted in the lectures, and he discourses on accessible themes such as world events in order to explain his philosophy. Much of the work is spent defining and characterizing Geist or spirit. The Geist is similar to the culture of people, and is constantly reworking itself to keep up with the changes of society, while at the same time working to produce those changes through what Hegel called the "cunning of reason" (List der Vernunft).

In the lectures, Hegel claims that cultural awareness of Geist originated in ancient Judaism; he thus ties his history of Geist to a narrative of disenchantment and a decline in pagan polytheism. Another important theme of the text is the focus on world history, rather than regional or state history. Thinkers such as Johann Gottfried Herder (1744–1803) and Johann Gottlieb Fichte (1762–1814) had written on the concept and importance of world history and nationalism, and Hegel's philosophy continues this trend, while breaking away from an emphasis on nationalism and striving rather to grasp the full sweep of human cultural and intellectual history as a manifestation of spirit.

=== Theodicy ===
Hegel explicitly presents his lectures on the philosophy of history as a theodicy, or a reconciliation of divine providence with the evils of history. This leads Hegel to consider the events of history in terms of universal reason: "That world history is governed by an ultimate design, that it is a rational process... this is a proposition whose truth we must assume; its proof lies in the study of world history itself, which is the image and enactment of reason."

The ultimate design of the world is such that absolute spirit, here understood as God, comes to know itself and fully become itself in and through the triumphs and tragedies of history. Hegel is clear that history does not produce happiness - "history is not the soil in which happiness grows. The periods of happiness in it are the blank pages of history"; "History as the slaughter-bench" (Geschichte als Schlachtbank) - and yet the aims of reason are accomplished. Hegel writes: "we must first of all know what the ultimate design of the world really is, and secondly, we must see that this design has been realized and that evil has not been able to maintain a position of equality beside it." To see the reason in history is to be able to account for the evil within it. He argued against the 'professional historians' of the day such as Ranke. Hegel points out that the understanding and consequently writing of history always relies on a framework. Hegel chose to openly admit and explain his framework rather than hide it as many historians choose to do.

=== History ===
According to Hegel, "World history... represents the development of the spirit's consciousness of its own freedom and of the consequent realization of this freedom". This realization is seen by studying the various cultures that have developed over the millennia, and trying to understand the way that freedom has worked itself out through them. Hegel's account of history begins with ancient cultures as he understood them. His account of the civilizations relied upon 19th century European scholarship, and contains an unavoidable Eurocentric bias. At the same time, the developmental nature of Hegel's philosophy meant that rather than simply deprecating ancient civilizations and non-European cultures, he saw them as necessary (if incomplete or underdeveloped) steps in the outworking of absolute spirit. Hegel's lectures on the philosophy of history contain one of his most well-known and controversial claims about the notion of freedom:

World history is the record of the spirit's efforts to attain knowledge of what it is in itself. The Orientals do not know that the spirit or man as such are free in themselves. And because they do not know that, they are not themselves free. They only know that One is free.... The consciousness of freedom first awoke among the Greeks, and they were accordingly free; but, like the Romans, they only knew that Some, and not all men as such, are free.... The Germanic nations, with the rise of Christianity, were the first to realize that All men are by nature free, and that freedom of spirit is his very essence.

In other words, Hegel maintains that the consciousness of freedom in history moves from despotism, to a sense that freedom is a privilege of a few, to a robust notion that humanity is free in and of itself. Hegel believes that the spirit of human freedom is best nurtured within a constitutional monarchy in which the monarch embodies the spirit and desires of the governed, and his reading of history locates the rise of such forms of government in the Germanic nations of, for example, the United Kingdom and Prussia after the Protestant Reformation. Hegel's "one, some, and all" proposition follows the basic geographical metaphor Hegel takes throughout his philosophy of history, namely, "World history travels from east to west; for Europe is the absolute end of history, just as Asia is the beginning." When referring to the east, Hegel generally has in mind the historical cultures of Persia, though at times he does reference China and spends a great deal of space discussing India and Indian religions. However, he has also said that any view of history (including his own) should be open to change based on the 'empirical facts' available.

== The text ==
=== German editions ===
Because of the nature of the text (collections of edited lecture notes), critical editions were slow in forthcoming. The standard German edition for many years was the manuscript of Hegel's son Karl Hegel, published in 1840. The German edition produced by Eva Moldenhauer and Karl Michel (1986) essentially follows Karl Hegel's edition. The only critical edition in German of the text of the lectures is Georg Lasson's 4 vol. edition (1917–1920). This edition was published repeatedly (last in two volumes in 1980) by Felix Meiner Verlag, Hamburg. The long introduction was re-edited on the basis of Lasson's publication in 1955, by Johannes Hoffmeister.

=== English editions ===
The first English translation was made by John Sibree (1857) from Karl Hegel's edition, which lacked much material discovered later.

An English translation of the Introduction to the lectures was produced by Robert S. Hartman (1953) which included an introduction and additional editorial footnotes. Hartman produced this translation before Hoffmeister's critical edition was published, and it is quite short, only 95 pages.

An English translation of Hoffmeister's critical edition of the Introduction was produced in 1974 by H. B. Nisbet. This edition presents the full text of the Introduction to Karl Hegel manuscript, as well as all later additions included in the Hoffmeister edition of the Introduction. As such, it is the only critical edition of any portion of the lectures available in English. No translation of the full edition of the lectures following Lasson has yet been produced.

A new translation of the entirety of the Vorlesungen was published in 2011, translated by Ruben Alverado, based on the edition published by Friedrich Brünstad in 1907. This edition makes use of the original Sibree translation, checked against the edition by Philipp Reclam of Stuttgart, published in 1961, and of Suhrkamp Verlag, published in 1970.

Oxford University Press has since published translations of the critical editions of the lectures of 1822–1823 and of 1830–1831 completed by Robert F. Brown and Peter C. Hodgson.

== See also ==
- Eschatology
- Philosophy of history
- Theodicy
- Volksgeist
