= Arcangelo Sassolino =

Italian sculptor

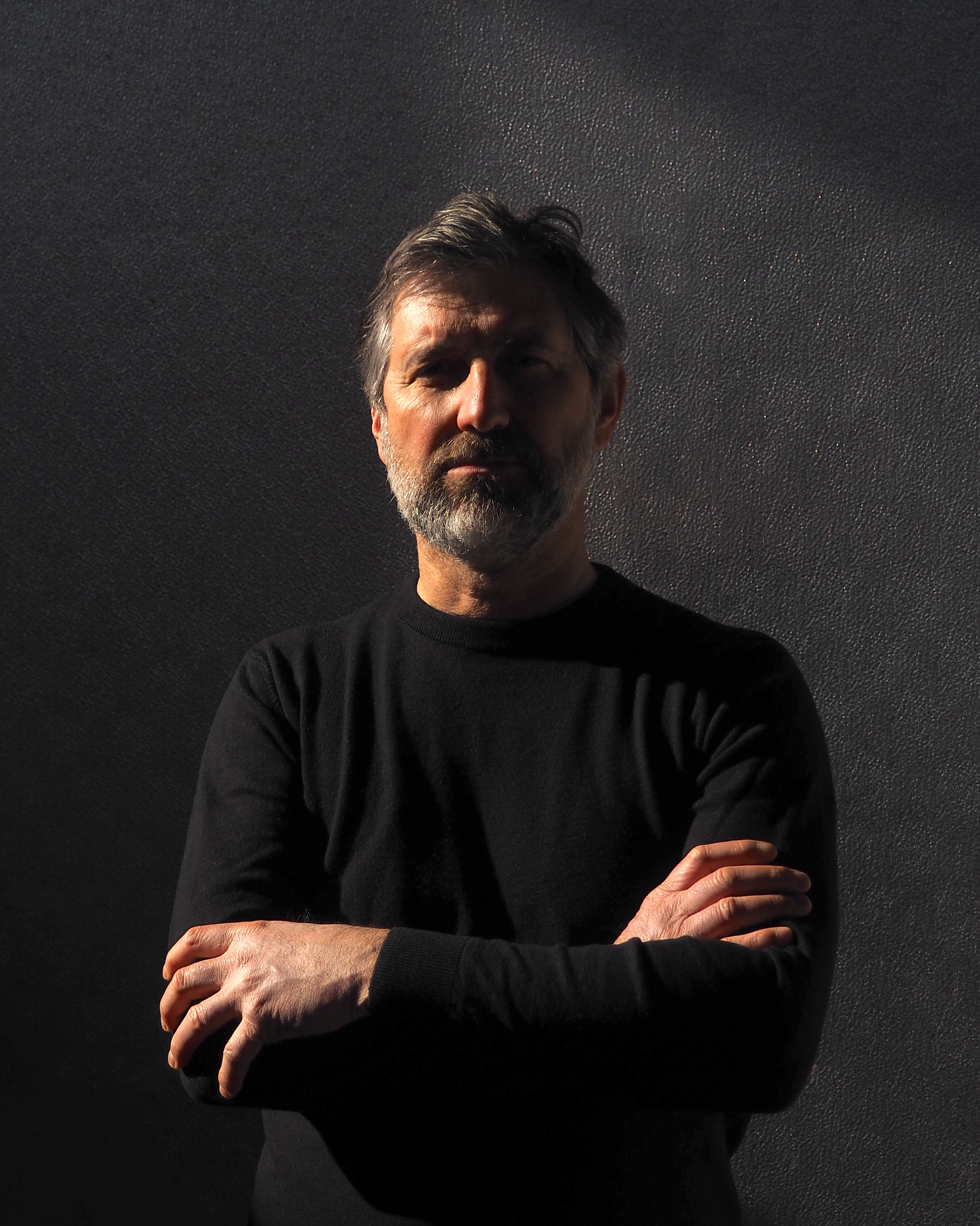
- Born: 1967 (age 58–59); Montecchio Maggiore, Italy
- Occupation: Sculptor

Arcangelo Sassolino (born 1967) is an Italian artist known for his sculptures that uses technology.

== Early life ==
Sassolino was born in 1967 in Vicenza, Italy. He was raised in Trissino, near Vicenza, in the north-east of Italy. In his 20s, he created a three-dimensional puzzle game recalling the Rubik's Cube, and was hired by Robert Fuhrer and Nextoy, LLC, representatives of Casio Creative Products, for which worked for 6 years in New York, inventing and developing original and innovative toys and games. In 1996 Sassolino went back to Italy, where he worked on marble sculpture in Pietrasanta.

== Artistic Path ==
In Sassolino's works the spectators find themselves in front of well known industrial materials, such as stainless steel, glass or concrete. He uses these materials into mechanical/thermodynamical fantastic machines, that make the elements reach their limits: extreme speed, friction, gravity, heat, pressure.

Sassolino's sculptures are inorganic performances in which machines take life, get broken by contrast and conflict of forces, on the verge of a breakdown (which is a fundamental aspect of his work). He works around concepts such caducity, loss, unpredictability, danger, failure.

== Solo exhibitions ==
- Superdome, Palais de Tokyo, Paris. 29/5/2008 – 24/8/2008
- Time Tomb, Z33 House for Contemporary Art], Hasselt. 0/5/2010 – 29/8/2010
- Piccolo animismo, Macro, Rome. 9/3/2011 – 12/6/2011
- Not Human, Contemporary Art Museum St. Louis, 15/1/2016 – 3/4/2016
- Mechanism of Power, Frankfurter Kunstverein, Frankfurt. 19/2/2016 – 17/4/2016
- Canto V, Galleria Continua, San Gimignano. 21/9/ 2016 – 15/1/2017
- Matter Revealed Repetto Gallery, London. 4/10/2017 – 29/10/2017

== Group exhibitions ==
- Materia-Niente, Fondazione Bevilacqua La Masa, Venice. 26/4/2001 – 30/6/2001
- Temi & variazioni
- La scultura italiana del XXI secolo, Fondazione Arnaldo Pomodoro, Milan. 29/10/2010 – 30/ 1/ 2011
- Under Destruction, Museum Tinguely, Basel – 15/10/2010 – 23/1/2011; Swiss Institute, New York 6/4/2011 – 8/5/2011
- Art and the City Zürich-West. 9/6/2012 – 23/9/2012
- Francis Bacon e la condizione esistenziale nell'arte contemporanea, CCC Strozzina, Florence – 5/10/2012 – 27/1/2013
- Follia Continua ! 104 Le Centroquatre, Paris – 21/10/2015 – 21/11/2015
- The Transported Man [Broad Art Museum], East Lansing. 29/4/2017 – 22/10/2017
- Porto Marghera 100 Doge's Palace, Venice, 4/11/2017 – 28/1/2018

== Bibliography ==
- Gabriele Guercio e Anna Mattirolo (a cura di), Il confine evanescente. Arte italiana 1960–2010, 2010, Electa, pag.188–189
- Francis Bacon e la condizione esistenziale nell’arte contemporanea, exhibit's catalogue by Franziska Nori and Barbara Dawson, Centro di Cultura Contemporanea Strozzina, Fondazione Palazzo Strozzi. October 5, 2012– January 27, 2013
- ART AND THE CITY, A public art project, catalogo della mostra. Zurigo 9 giugno-23 settembre 2012. Curator Christoph Doswald, JRP Ringier Verlag, Zurich.
- A.A.V.V., l’arte del XX secolo. Tendenze della contemporaneità 2000 e oltre, 2010, Skira, pag 270–271
- AAVV, Vitamin 3-D, New Perspectives in Sculpture and Installation. An up-to-the-minute survey of contemporary sculpture and installation featuring 117 artists, Phaidon Editors, 2009, pag 266–267
- Jasper Sharp (edited by), Arcangelo Sassolino, JRP Ringier, 2009. Under Destruction, If nothing can be created, then something must be destroyed, edited by Gianni Jetzer – Chris Sharp, catalogue of the exhibition, Tinguely Museum Basel, Swiss Institute New York, 2010, Published by Distanz.
- Luca Illetterati e Arcangelo Sassolino, 6 words 20 works, Padova University Press, Padova, 2016 ISBN 9788869380556
- Giulia Zandonadi, Il ritmo della materia. Forma e tempo nell'opera di Arcangelo Sassolino, tesi di laurea magistrale, Università Ca' Foscari Venezia, relatore Nico Stringa, correlatore Stefania Portinari, a.a. 2013/2014
- Giulia Plebani, Arcangelo Sassolino. Materiali ai limiti della resistenza, master's degree thesis, University of Bologna, supervisor Silvia Grandi.
