= Johannes Hoffmeister =

Johannes Hoffmeister may refer to:

- Johannes Hoffmeister (philosopher)
- Hans Hoffmeister (water polo)
