= Dina Emundts =

German philosopher (born 1972)

Academic background
- Education: Humboldt University (PhD)
- Thesis: Erfahren und Erkennen. Hegels Theorie der Wirklichkeit (2009)
- Academic advisors: Rolf-Peter Horstmann, Ludwig Siep, Michael Theunissen

Academic work
- Era: Contemporary philosophy
- Region: Western philosophy
- School or tradition: German Idealism
- Institutions: Free University of Berlin

Dina Emundts (born 1972) is a German philosopher and university lecturer at the Institute of Philosophy at the Free University of Berlin. Since 2017, she's been the president of the International Hegel Association succeeding Axel Honneth.

== Education ==
From 1991 to 1998, she studied philosophy and German Studies at the Free University of Berlin and the Humboldt University of Berlin. After completing her M.A. in 1998, with the thesis Kants Geschichtsphilosophie (Kant's philosophy of history). In 1998 she received a scholarship from the Istituto Italiano per gli studii filosofici. From 1998 to 2010, she was a research assistant at the Institute of Philosophy at the Humboldt University of Berlin in the department of Rolf-Peter Horstmann. She completed her doctorate in July 2003 at the Humboldt University with a thesis on Kant's philosophy of nature (Kants Übergangskonzeption im Opus postumum).

== Career ==
She held a DFG fellowship from 2007 to 2010 with the project Resistance in Hegel and Peirce. In 2007 she was a Visiting Scholar at the Department of Philosophy at New York University. In 2008 she was a Visiting Scholar at the Department of Philosophy at UC Berkeley. In the summer semester of 2009, she substituted for Ludwig Siep at the Institute of Philosophy at the University of Münster. In the winter semester 2009/2010, she held the chair of Birgit Sandkaulen at the Institute of Philosophy at the University of Jena. After completing her habilitation at Humboldt University in 2010 with the thesis Erfahren und Erkennen. Hegels Theorie der Wirklichkeit, she taught from 2010 to 2016 as professor of philosophy and philosophy of science with a special focus on the philosophy of language, the philosophy of mind and the philosophy of science of the understanding sciences (Wissenschaftstheorie der verstehenden Wissenschaften) at the Department of Philosophy at the University of Konstanz.

Since 2016, she has been Professor of history of philosophy at the Free University of Berlin.

Emundts 2012 book Erfahren und Erkennen: Hegels Theorie der Wirklichkeit is the revised version of her Habilitationsschrift from 2009, in which she puts forward her interpretation of Hegel's theoretical philosophy. The book is mainly focused on Hegel's Phenomenology of Spirit. According to Emundt: "for Hegel, truth can not be purely conceptual", but the non-conceptual element belonging to experience, is necessary, since conceptual principles can only be developed, when there is something external to them, that can be realized according to those principles. In refining what has been said about the first chapter of the Phenomenology, Emundt argues that the "Sense Certainty" position fails, not because it's committed to making non-conceptual reference, to singular items of sensory experience, but because it can not assert that an object exists, without referring to it in an extended period of time, and thereby making it universal. In the case of "Perception" chapter, the position similarly fails, not because of the contradiction between an object and its properties, but "a universal that perseveres despite the diversity of the singular". In the book Emundts also criticizes Kant's philosophy, according to which our knowledge of objects becomes infallible. The book has been reviewed by Angelica Nuzzo, Brady Bowman, Holger Glinka and Eva Deitert.

== Writings (selection) ==
=== In English ===
- Emundts, Dina, ed. (2013). Self, World, and Art: Metaphysical Topics in Kant and Hegel. De Gruyter. doi:10.1515/9783110290813. ISBN 9783110290813.

=== In German ===
- with Rolf-Peter Horstmann: Georg Wilhelm Friedrich Hegel. Eine Einführung. Stuttgart 2002, ISBN 3-15-018167-4.
- Kants Übergangskonzeption im Opus postumum. Zur Rolle des Nachlaßwerkes für die Grundlegung der empirischen Physik. Berlin 2004, ISBN 3-11-018052-9.
- Erfahren und Erkennen. Hegels Theorie der Wirklichkeit. Frankfurt am Main 2012, ISBN 978-3-465-03760-6. 2. Auflage (= Klostermann Rote Reihe 145) Frankfurt am Main 2022, ISBN 978-3-465-04595-3.
- as editor with Sally Sedgwick: Der deutsche Idealismus und die Rationalisten. German Idealism and the Rationalists. Berlin 2019, ISBN 3-11-064826-1.
