= International Congress of Entomology =

Entomology conference

- Status: Active
- Genre: Entomology conference
- Frequency: Quadrennial
- Location: Varies
- Country: Varies
- Years active: 1910–present
- Inaugurated: August 1, 1910; 116 years ago, Brussels, Belgium
- Most recent: XXVII Congress, Kyoto, Japan, 25-30 August 2024
- Next event: XXVIII Congress Cape Town, South Africa, 17-21 July 2028
- Major events: Active
- Website: www.icecouncil.org

The International Congress of Entomology (ICE) is the largest in-person conference for the science of entomology. It generally meets every 4 years, and has been held in locations around the world since 1910. Initially conferences were organized by entomologists from each host country. Since 1988 the conference has been organized by the Council for International Congresses of Entomology, with development of the scientific programs primarily by entomologists from the host country.

== History ==
The first International Congress of Entomology took place in Brussels, Belgium in 1910, in large part due to the leadership of Karl Jordan of Tring, Hertfordshire. Jordan organized a series of preliminary meetings under the chairmanship of the president of the Entomological Society of London, Frederick Augustus Dixey, attracting leaders in the field including Walther Horn (Germany), Armand Janet (Paris), and Edward Bagnall Poulton (Oxford). The first Congress attracted 292 attendees from "all countries of the civilized world", who came from as far away as Alexandria, India, Montreal and Buenos Aires. Attendees determined that the second International Congress of Entomology would be held in Oxford in 1912, under the direction of E.B. Poulton.

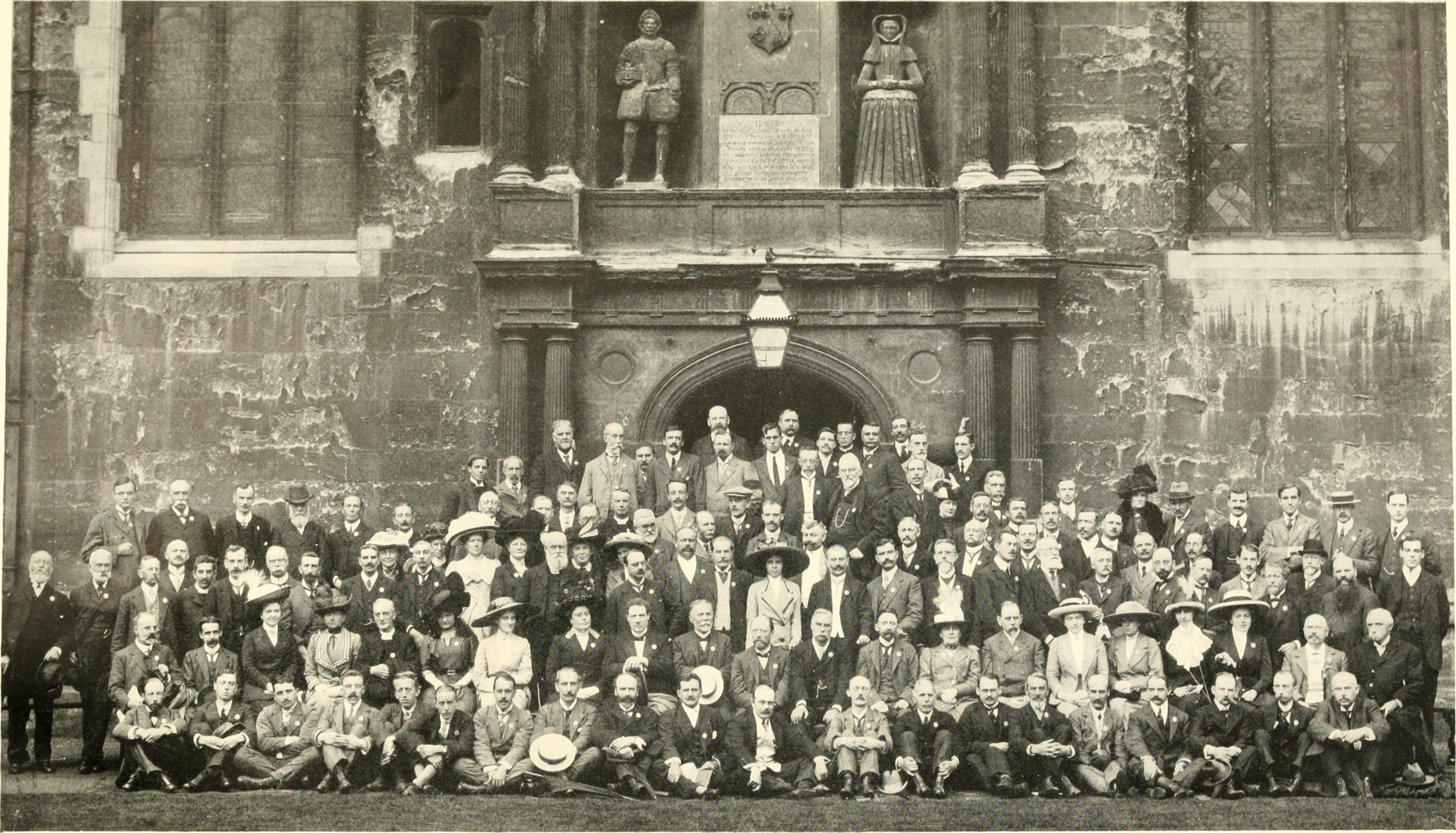
Attendees, Second International Congress of Entomology, Oxford, 1912

The 3rd Congress was intended to be held in Vienna, Austria in 1915, but World War I intervened. The 3rd Congress did not occur until 1925, when it was held in Zurich, Switzerland, under the direction of Anton Schulthess-Rechberg. Although Switzerland was known for its neutrality, there was a conspicuous absence of attendees from France, Italy, Belgium, and Russia, which may have reflected either lingering ill feeling or post-war monetary difficulties. The turnout of American entomologists was also low.

Perhaps surprisingly, the Congress accepted a proposal from Leland Ossian Howard that the next Congress be held in the United States of America. The 4th Congress was held at Cornell University in Ithaca, New York, in 1928. William Jacob Holland from the Carnegie Museum of Pittsburgh obtained funding from the Carnegie Endowment for International Peace to support travel for attendees from other countries, and over 600 visitors representing 39 countries attended the event. A number of the attendees were women, although they were generally listed as associates or guests. Nonetheless, the program included a luncheon for “visiting women actively engaged in entomological work", which was sponsored by Sigma Delta Epsilon, the Graduate Women’s Scientific Fraternity.

The 5th Congress was held in Paris, France, to honor the 100th anniversary of the founding of the Société entomologique de France. The president of the Congress was Paul Marchal.

The 6th International Congress of Entomology was held at Madrid, Spain in 1935, under the leadership of Ignacio Bolivar y Urrutia. The opening session was chaired by the President of the Spanish Republic The 6th Congress' proceedings did not appear until 1940, following the Spanish Civil War of 1936–1939. The proceedings do not include contributions from a number of Spanish entomologists were associated with the Second Spanish Republic, the government which lost power in 1939.

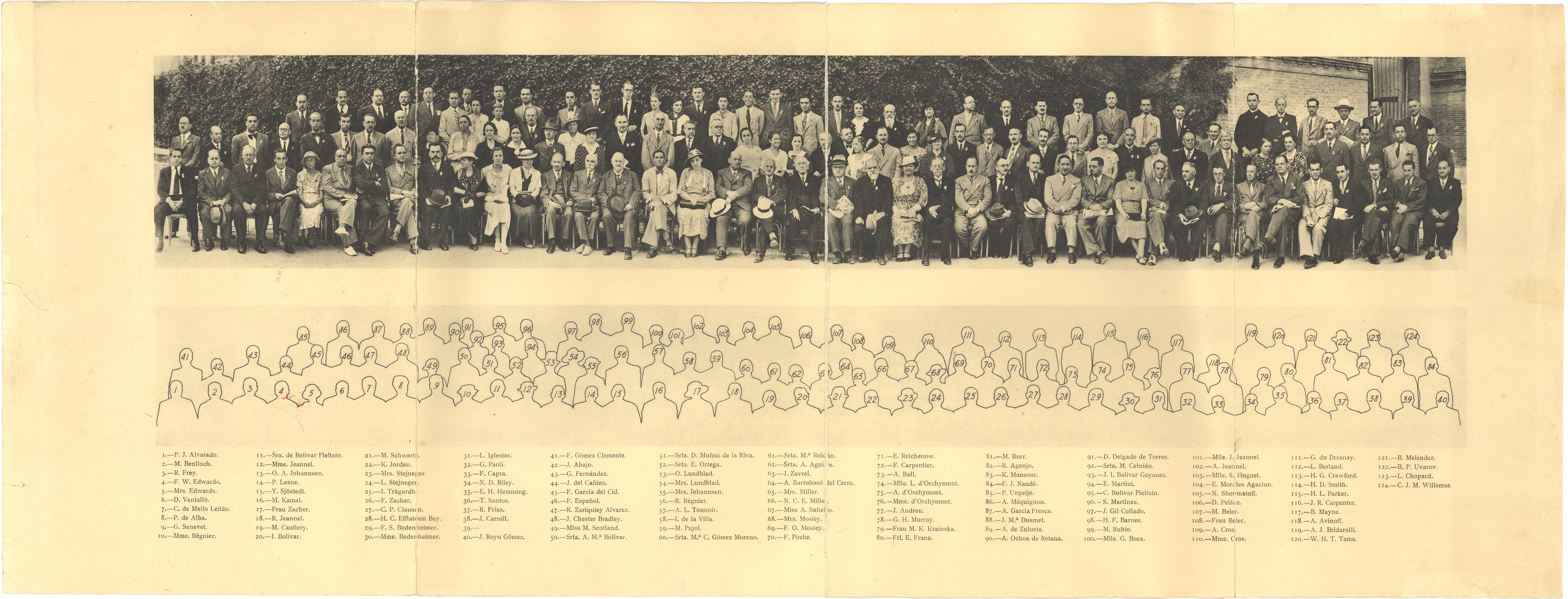
Attendees, Sixth International Congress of Entomology, Madrid, 1935

The 7th Congress was held in Berlin, Germany, in 1938, with over 500 attendees from 50 countries. The president of the Congress was Erich Martini of Hamburg, Hermann Göring was listed as a patron of the Congress and a congratulatory telegram from Adolf Hitler was read at the opening ceremonies. The 8th Congress, planned for Stockholm in 1941, was delayed until 1948, due to World War II.

The XXVI International Congress of Entomology was to be held in Helsinki, Finland in July 2020 but was delayed to July 2022 due to the COVID-19 pandemic. The 2024 Congress is planned to be held in Japan. The pandemic has had a substantial impact on entomologists and their research.

== Locations ==
A majority of the congresses have been held in Europe. Congresses have been held in the United States (Ithaca, NY, 1928; Washington, DC, 1976; Orlando, FL 2016) and Canada (Montreal, Quebec 1958; Vancouver, B.C. 1988). Congress were held in the Southern Hemisphere in Canberra, Australia (1972), Iguazu Falls, Brazil (2000), Brisbane, Australia (2004), and Durban, South Africa (2008). Congresses were held in Asia in Kyoto, Japan (1980, 2024); Beijing, China (1992) and Daegu, South Korea (2012).

== List of Congresses ==
- I Congress, Brussels, Belgium, 1–6 August 1910
- II Congress, Oxford, United Kingdom, 12–17 August 1912
- III Congress, Zürich, Switzerland, 19–26 July 1925
- IV Congress, Ithaca, NY, USA, August 1928
- V Congress, Paris, France, 15–23 July 1932
- VI Congress, Madrid, Spain, 6–12 September 1935
- VII Congress, Berlin, Germany, 15–20 August 1938
- VIII Congress, Stockholm, Sweden, 8–15 August 1948
- IX Congress, Amsterdam, Netherlands, 17–24 August 1951
- X Congress, Montreal, Canada, 17–25 August 1958
- XI Congress, Vienna, Austria, 17–25 August 1960
- XII Congress, London, United Kingdom, 6–16 July 1964
- XIII Congress, Moscow, USSR, 2–9 August 1968
- XIV Congress, Canberra, Australia, 22–30 August 1972
- XV Congress, Washington, DC, USA 11–27 August 1976
- XVI Congress, Kyoto, Japan, 3–9 August 1980
- XVII Congress, Hamburg, Germany, 20–26 August 1984
- XVIII Congress, Vancouver, Canada, 3–9 July 1988
- XIX Congress, Beijing, China, 28 June–4 July 1992
- XX Congress, Florence, Italy, 25–30 August 1996
- XXI Congress, Iguaçu Falls, Brazil, 20–26 August 2000
- XXII Congress, Brisbane, Australia, 15–21 August 2004
- XXIII Congress, Durban, South Africa, 6–12 July 2008
- XXIV Congress, Daegu, South Korea, 19–25 August 2012
- XXV Congress, Orlando, FL, USA, 25–30 September 2016
- XXVI Congress, Helsinki, Finland, 17–22 July 2022
- XXVII Congress, Kyoto, Japan, 25–30 August 2024

== Organization ==
Initially, congresses were proposed and organized by volunteers from various countries. The 1988 congress in Vancouver, Canada, was the last to be largely organized by volunteers. Since 1988, congresses have been organized through the work of the Council for International Congresses of Entomology. The Council is a group of 23 scientists from national entomological societies from geographic regions around the world. The scientific program for each conference continues to be developed mainly by entomologists from the host country.
