= Eduard May =

German biologist, natural philosopher and entomologist (1905–1956)

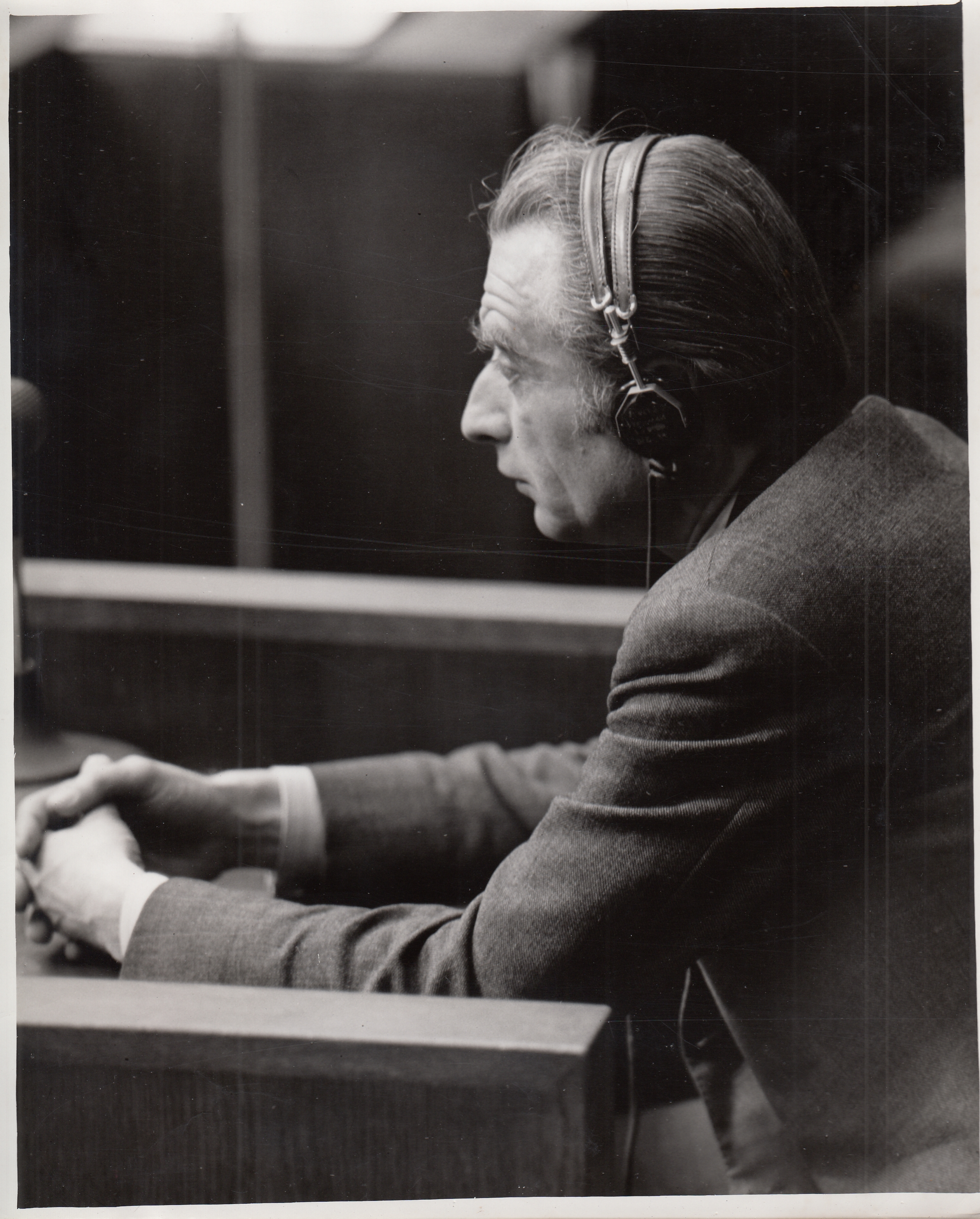
May on trial in Nuremberg, 1947

Eduard May (14 June 1905, Mainz – 10 July 1956, Berlin) was a German biologist, natural philosopher, and entomologist who worked for an entomological research institute in Dachau established as part of the Nazi Ahnenerbe.

== Life and work ==
May was born in Mainz and studied in Frankfurt am Main before entering the University of Frankfurt am Main where he studied zoology under Otto zur Strassen. His doctorate in 1929 was on shipworms. He then studied dragonflies at the Senckenberg Museum under Adalbert Seitz and processed the collections of Friedrich Ris. He was also involved in pest control working as a consultant for the chemical firm Gebrüder Borchers A.G, Goslar. He received several patents. In 1941, he went to Munich and later Starnberg. He was a friend of Hugo Dingler and became a professor at the Ludwig-Maximilians-Universität München looking at relativism and natural philosophy. During World War II he was not drafted into the Wehrmacht as he had ear disease. In 1941, he was chosen by Wolfram Sievers for a new entomological institute that Heinrich Himmler sought to establish. Himmler was concerned by lice, typhus, flies, and was also interested in the applications of insect for wartime use. In 1943, he was assigned a research contract to develop control measures against mosquitoes as well as in the production of malarial mosquitoes which could be used for biological warfare. Although he was not a member of the NSDAP he made anti-semitic comments in some of his writings. May worked in the institute which was located on the edge of the Dachau concentration camp and was part of a larger institute for applied defence science with other researchers who included Sigmund Rascher, Claus Schilling, and August Hirt, Rascher conducted lethal experiments on Dachau inmates and Hirt conducted mustard gas trials, collecting skulls for research. May conducted experiments on mosquitoes, their survival under different conditions particularly without food. In one letter he notes that Anopheles maculipennis was able to withstand prolonged survival without food and that it would be ideal for release, suggesting that offensive applications were not absent in the research. He also worked on fleas under a project code named "Siebenschlaefer" (Dormouse). This work involved collaboration with Karl Josef Gross who was known for his work on plague and typhus. He worked as SS-Sturmbannfuehrer at Posen and conducted human experiments in concentration camps. May recruited staff and advisors for his projects. These included Professor Josef Meixner from the University of Graz, Professor Erwin Schimitschek from the University of Vienna, Erich Martini, Professor Friedrich Peus, and the advisors included his former employer Friedrich Borchers, Erwin Schimitschek, and Max Cretschmar. In September 1943, Sievers ordered May to manage rat control measures at Auschwitz concentration camp. May was involved along with Hans Bischoff in the confiscation of the Schmitz-Wassmann-collection of ants and Phoridae from Valkenberg, Maastricht and its movement to Berlin in 1943.

May was imprisoned by American forces in 1945 and was acquitted because his superior Wolfram Sievers wrote that May studied insects and had refused to conduct experiments on humans. His position at the Ludwig-Maximilians-Universität München was terminated and on April 14, 1947, he was a witness at the Nuremberg Trials. In 1948, he founded a journal called Philosophia naturalis and taught at the Free University of Berlin from 1950 to 1956, succeeding Hans Leisegang as professor of philosophy.
