= European Journal of Philosophy =

- Discipline: Philosophy
- Language: English
- Edited by: Joseph K. Schear

Publication details
- History: 1993–present
- Publisher: Wiley-Blackwell
- Frequency: Quarterly

Standard abbreviations
- ISO 4: Eur. J. Philos.

Indexing
- ISSN: 0966-8373 (print); 1468-0378 (web)
- LCCN: 94644393
- OCLC no.: 663108307

Links
- Journal homepage; Online access; Online archive; Inngentaconnect archive

The European Journal of Philosophy is a peer-reviewed academic journal of philosophy published quarterly by Wiley-Blackwell. It was established by Mark Sacks in 1993 and the current editor-in-chief is Joseph K. Schear.

== Editorial Committee ==
The current members of the editorial committee for the journal are:

- Barbara Carnevali, École des Hautes Études en Sciences Sociales, Paris, France
- Dina Emundts, Freie Universität Berlin, Germany
- Andrew Huddleston, University of Warwick, UK (Also Book Reviews Editor)
- Jessica Leech, King's College London, England
- Wayne Martin, University of Essex, England
- Christoph Menke, Goethe University, Frankfurt, Germany
- Frederick Neuhouser, Barnard College, Columbia University New York, USA
- Ursula Renz, University of Graz, Austria
- Beate Rössler, University of Amsterdam, The Netherlands

== Notable articles ==
The following articles are listed by the journal as its "Top Articles":

- Habermas, Jürgen (2006). "Religion in the Public Sphere". European Journal of Philosophy. 14: 1. doi:10.1111/j.1468-0378.2006.00241.x.
- Williams, Bernard (2009). "Life as Narrative". European Journal of Philosophy. 17 (2): 305. doi:10.1111/j.1468-0378.2007.00275.x.
- Setiya, Kieran (2011). "Reasons and Causes". European Journal of Philosophy. 19: 129. doi:10.1111/j.1468-0378.2009.00378.x.
