= Michael Quante =

German philosopher (born 1962)

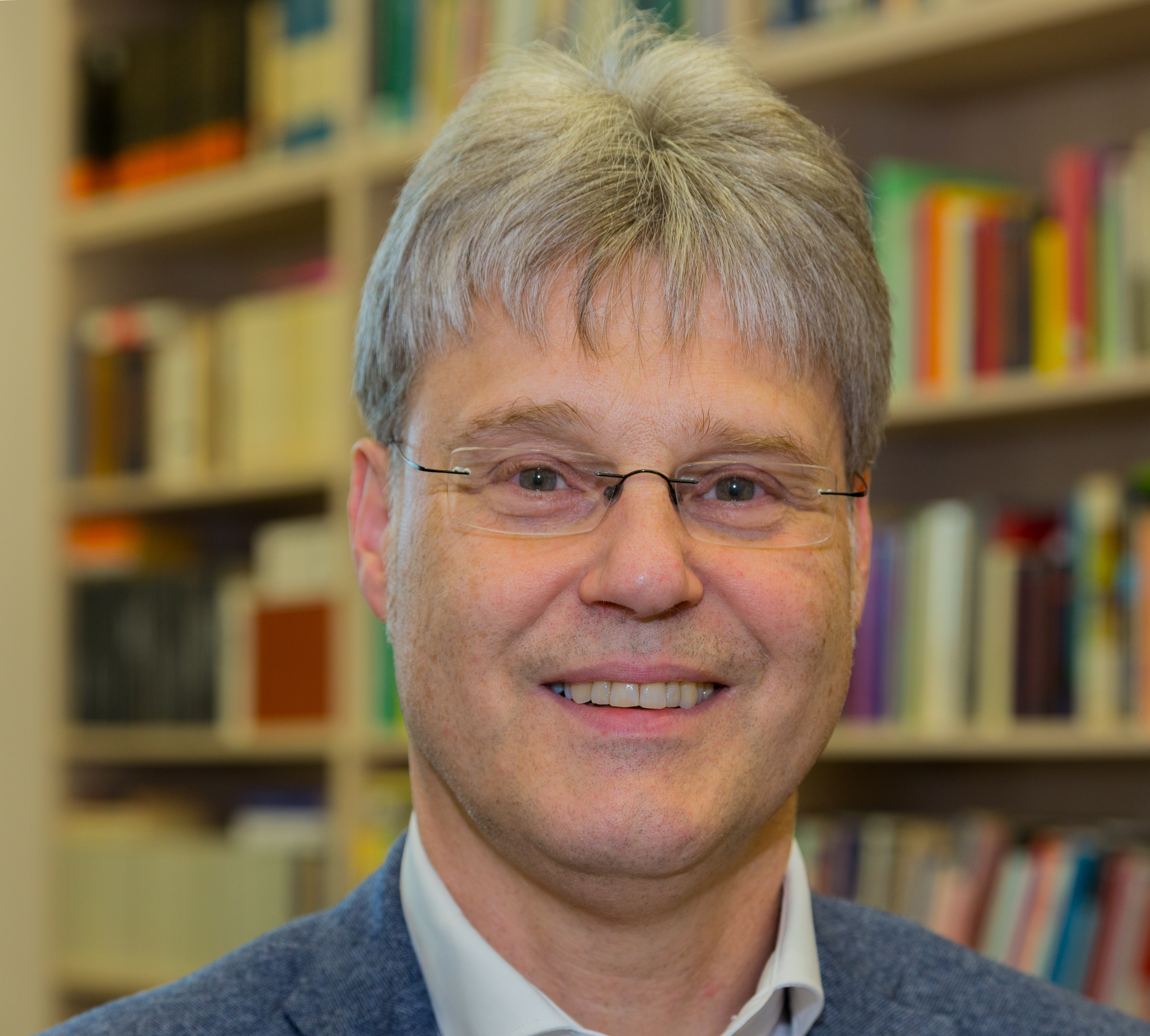
- Quante in 2019
- Born: 1962 (age 63–64); Senden, North Rhine-Westphalia, West Germany

Education
- Education: Free University of Berlin; University of Münster (PhD)
- Thesis: Hegels Begriff der Handlung (1992)
- Doctoral advisor: Ludwig Siep

Philosophical work
- Era: Contemporary philosophy
- Region: Western philosophy
- School: German idealism
- Institutions: University of Münster
- Main interests: Action theory, ethics
- Notable ideas: Personal identity as a principle of biomedical ethics

Michael Quante (German: [ˈkvantə]; born 2 August 1962) is a German philosopher. He is currently a professor of philosophy with a focus on practical philosophy at the University of Münster. From 2012 to 2014, he succeeded Julian Nida-Rümelin as the president of Deutschen Gesellschaft für Philosophie.

== Life ==
Michael Quante was born on 2 August 1962 in Senden. He studied German and philosophy from 1982 to 1989, first for two semesters at the Free University of Berlin and then at the University of Münster, where he completed his studies with a thesis on Marx's critique of Hegel. Under the supervision of Ludwig Siep, Quante received his doctorate in 1992 with a thesis on Hegels Begriff der Handlung (subsequently translated into English as Hegel's Concept of Action in 2004 by Dean Moyar). Also at the University of Münster, Quante habilitated in 2001 at the Department of History/Philosophy with the book Personales Leben und menschlicher Tod. In this work, published by Suhrkamp Verlag in 2002, Quante attempts to make a concept of personal identity fruitful for questions of biomedical ethics, in particular with regard to the beginning and end of human life.

After his habilitation, Quante worked as a university lecturer at the Westphalian Wilhelms University and held a visiting professorship for ethics at the Humboldt University of Berlin as well as a substitute professorship for practical philosophy at the University of Duisburg-Essen. He was appointed Professor of practical philosophy at the University of Duisburg-Essen in 2004. In 2005, Quante was appointed professor of philosophy with a focus on practical philosophy at the University of Cologne. In 2009, he was appointed professor of philosophy with a focus on practical philosophy at the Westfälische Wilhelms-Universität Münster. Since 2009, he has also been Principal Investigator of the Cluster of Excellence “Religion and Politics” and a member of the DFG Research Unit “Theoretische Grundfragen der Normenbegründung in Medizinethik und Biopolitik”.

Starting with volume 47, Quante is editor of Hegel-Studien together with Birgit Sandkaulen. He has been a member of the Rectorate of the University of Münster as Vice-Rector for International Affairs, Transfer and Sustainability since October 2016. In September 2019, he was elected Chairman of the Internationalen Marx-Engels-Stiftung replacing Herfried Münkler.

Quante lives in Senden (Westfalen).

== Work ==
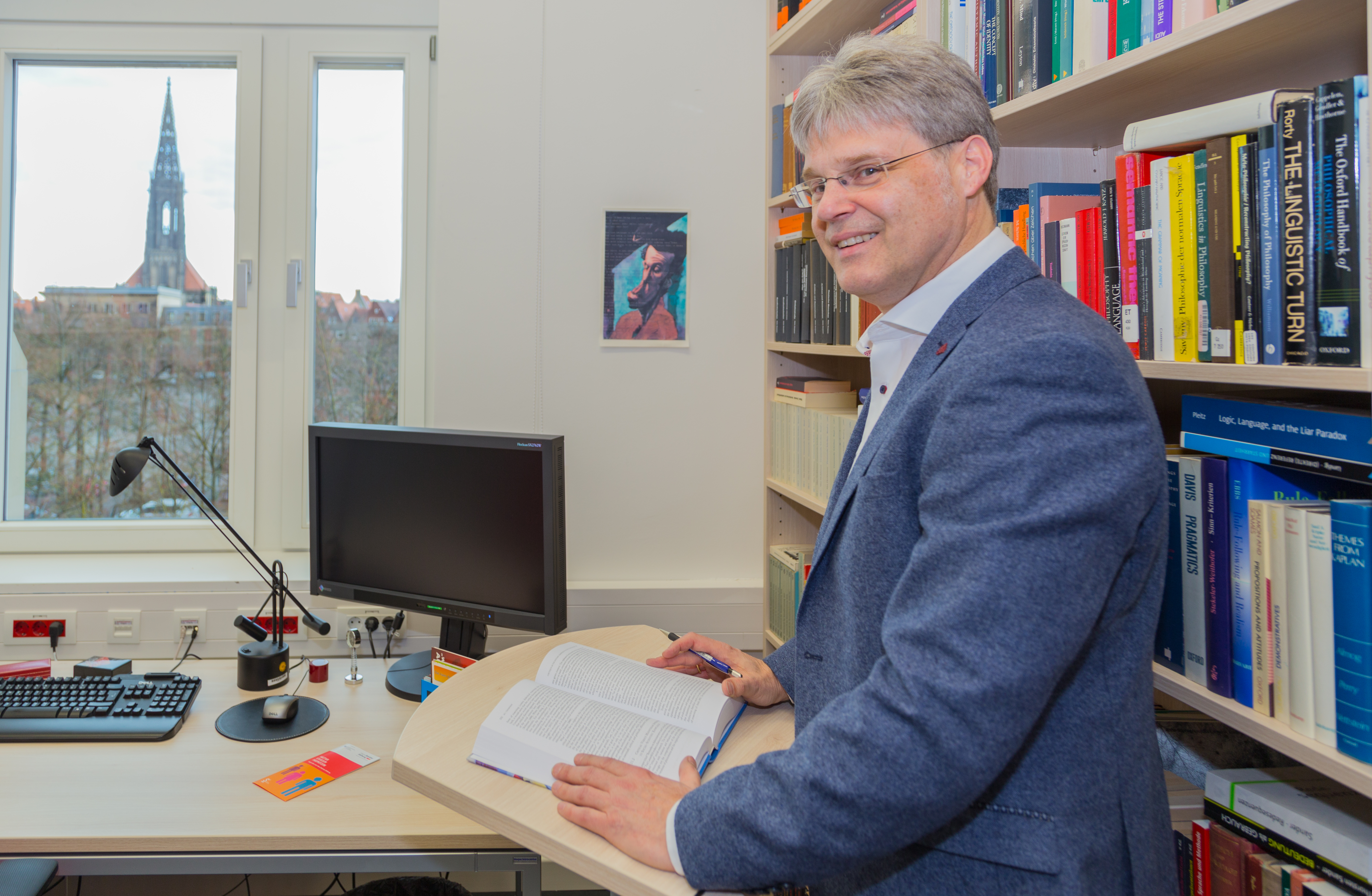
Quante in his office in the former Collegium Ludgerianum (2019)

Quante's research focuses on the philosophy of German idealism, philosophy of the person, action theory, ethics, biomedical ethics and philosophy of law and social philosophy.

=== Hegel ===
In his dissertation Hegels Begriff der Handlung (1993), Quante examines the Hegelian concept of action, as it is thematized in the morality chapter of Hegel's Elements of the Philosophy of Right, with reference to the debates of analytical action theory.

In his monograph Die Wirklichkeit des Geistes (2011) Quante deals with Hegel's philosophy from numerous systematic perspectives, with Hegel's philosophy of spirit, but also its connection with Hegel's concept of nature (Naturbegriff), being at the center of the individual chapters that emerged from his essays on Hegelian philosophy.

Overall, Quante's examination of Hegel is characterized above all by the goal of making Hegel's philosophy of spirit fruitful for central questions of the present. The peculiarity of Quante's research on Hegel consists primarily in the multifaceted and detailed uncovering of the factual proximity between Hegelian philosophy and the philosophy of pragmatism. For Quante, this primarily includes Hegel's rejection of the primacy of scientific theorizing, Hegel's social-externalist or ascriptivist conception of the mind, which sees the essence of mental episodes grounded in social practices of recognition and the attribution of responsibility, and Hegel's anti-scepticism, which does not trace philosophical argumentation back to a single, ultimately founded principle, but attempts to establish it through the context of the system as a whole.

=== Marx ===
In Marx research, Michael Qante's work focuses primarily on the philosophical foundations of Marx's theory. In doing so, he attempts to demonstrate a continuity between the early work and the mature Karl Marx of Kapital and to reject the thesis of an epistemological break, as popularized above all by Louis Althusser. According to Quante, the decisive link between the early and late writings critical of economics lies at the level of action theory: in both the Economic-Philosophical Manuscripts and Kapital, Marx works with a “model of the objectification of action”, according to which phenomena of alienation associated with products of action (e.g. commodities) can be traced back to the preceding processes of action and their social conditions of origin. According to Quante, the principle of recognition (adopted in a modified form from Hegel) is also central to both the scientific representation and the evaluation of the social contexts of actions for the early and later Marx. Additionally, Quante traces the philosophical and ideological transition from Hegel to Marx by tracing the context of post-Hegelian debate in the environment of the Young Hegelians. He works out which theoretical elements Marx adopts from Hegel and other Young Hegelians and which he gains by differentiating himself from others. Quantes' examination of Marx is also motivated by questions of systematic relevance to current debates.

=== Philosophy of person ===
In his treatises on the concept of the person, Quante emphasizes the central importance of the personal form of life for people's self-image. For him, the concept of the person also forms a hub for central philosophical questions. According to Quante, it is of fundamental importance in the definition of freedom and self-awareness, in the question of the relationship between body and mind and in the justification of central moral norms. In this context, Quante is interested in answering three fundamental questions connected with the identity of the person: First, about the characteristics of personhood that make someone or something a person; second, about the conditions of unity and persistence of persons that are to be distinguished from these; and third, about the role of identity as an evaluative self-relation of persons.

=== Moral particularism ===
Mostly in collaboration with Andreas Vieth, Quante works on a concept of ethical particularism. The conception represented there can be described as moderate ethical particularism insofar as the moral orientation function of principles is not fundamentally rejected, but only their limits and thus the significance of particularistic elements in ethics are worked out. Quante and Vieth call the counter-position to particularist ethics rationalist ethics, against which they raise three objections in particular:

1. Ethical knowledge is not exclusively inferential,
2. the basis of justified actions need not be universal laws and
3. Perception offers a primary and independent form of ethical justification.

A conception of perception as an independent source of ethical justification is therefore particularly central. In contrast to a merely passive analysis of perception as an inclination, Quante and Vieth therefore defend an active analysis according to which people are able to directly perceive salient ethical characteristics in individual situations on the basis of their own ethical experience and the associated learning processes, but also on the basis of their embeddedness in social and cultural contexts. At the same time, such a model should not completely reject principles as a model of ethical justification, but leave room for particularistic principles that are concrete and non-inferential, but still have general aspects.

In this sense, Quante and Vieth also recommend a further development of the principlism developed by Tom Beauchamp and James Childress, which, according to them, has a number of underdeterminations or even ambiguities, particularly with regard to the underlying understanding of principles. Beauchamp and Childress are accused of making an unjustified generalized criticism of intuitionism in their demarcation against both casuistic and deductivist conceptions of ethics. However, since they merely rejected a strong form of intuitionism, their conception is not only compatible with a weak intuitionism, but also well advised to clarify existing ambiguities in this direction and thus make particularist and casuistic elements more recognizable.

== Awards ==
- 2012: Honorary Doctorate (Dr. phil. h. c.) from University of Debrecen, Ungarn
- 2012: Admission as a full member in the Berlin-Brandenburgische Academy of Sciences
- 2013: Admission as a member in the section „Philosophy, theology and religious studies“ of Academia Europaea
- 2014: Deutscher Preis für Philosophie und Sozialethik (vergeben von der Max Uwe Redler Stiftung)
- 2016: Admission as a member in the North Rhine-Westphalian Academy of Sciences, Humanities and the Arts

== Selected publications ==
- Hegels Begriff der Handlung. Stuttgart-Bad Cannstatt: frommann-holzboog (Spekulation und Erfahrung II, 32), 1993 (Englische Übersetzung: Hegel’s Concept of Action. Cambridge: Cambridge UP 2004, Paperback 2010; Spanische Übersetzung: El concepto de acción en Hegel. Barcelona: Anthropos 2010; Italienische Übersetzung: Il Concetto Hegeliano Di Azione. Mailand: FrancoAngeli 2011; Ungarische Übersetzung: A Cselekvés Hegeli Koncepciója. Budapest: L’Harmattan 2011; japanische Übersetzung 2011 bei Libertas/Tokio; französische Übersetzung: Le concept hégélien de l’action. Rennes: Presses universitaires de Rennes 2012)
- Ethik der Organtransplantation. Harald Fischer Verlag, Erlangen 2000 (gemeinsam mit J.S. Ach & M. Anderheiden).
- Personales Leben und menschlicher Tod. Frankfurt am Main: Suhrkamp (stw 1573), 2002.
- Einführung in die allgemeine Ethik. Darmstadt: Wissenschaftliche Buchgesellschaft 2003; zweite, überarbeitete Auflage 2006, dritte Auflage 2008, vierte Auflage 2011.
- Enabling Social Europe (= Wissenschaftsethik und Technikfolgenbeurteilung Band 26), Berlin: Springer 2005 (gemeinsam mit: B.v. Maydell, K. Borchardt, K.-D. Henke, R. Leitner, R. Muffels, P.-L. Rauhala, G. Verschraegen und M. ´Zukowski); Paperback 2010.
- Person. Berlin: Walter de Gruyter 2007; zweite, erweiterte Auflage 2012.
- Karl Marx: Ökonomisch-Philosophische Manuskripte. Studienausgabe mit Kommentar. Frankfurt am Main: Suhrkamp Verlag 2009; zweite Auflage 2015.
- Menschenwürde und personale Autonomie. Demokratische Werte im Kontext der Lebenswissenschaften. Hamburg: Meiner Verlag 2010; zweite Auflage 2014 (japanische Übersetzung Hosei University Press 2015)
- Die Wirklichkeit des Geistes. Studien zu Hegel. Frankfurt am Main: Suhrkamp (stw 1939), 2011.
- Discovering, Reflecting and Balancing Values: Ethical Management in Vocational Educational Training. (gemeinsam mit Martin Büscher; unter Mitarbeit von Dominik Düber und Edgar Wehmeier) Hampp-Verlag:Mering/München 2014
- Interdisciplinary Research and Trans-disciplinary Validity Claims. Springer: Berlin 2014 (mit Gethmann, C.F., Carrier, M., Hanekamp, G., Kaiser, M., Kamp, G., Lingner, S. und Thiele, F.).
- Der unversöhnte Marx (1 ed.). mentis. 2018. ISBN 9783957431202.
- „Die Wurzel für den Menschen ist aber der Mensch selbst.“ Studien zur Philosophie von Karl Marx, Brill mentis, Paderborn 2025, ISBN ISBN 978-3-95743-316-9.
