= Mary McClintock Fulkerson =

Protestant theologian and scholar (born 1950)

Mary McClintock Fulkerson (born 1950) is a Protestant theologian and scholar whose work explores feminist theologies and gender issues. She is currently a Professor Emerita of Theology at Duke Divinity School and an ordained minister in the Presbyterian Church (U.S.A.).

== Early life and education ==
McClintock Fulkerson earned her Bachelor of Music from the University of North Carolina at Chapel Hill in 1972. During her undergraduate years, she played the piano and the cello, and was active in UNC's chapter of Campus Crusade for Christ. She then enrolled at Union Theological Seminary in Richmond, Virginia, but decided to matriculate at Duke Divinity School instead given her marriage to William Fulkerson, who was a student at the UNC School of Medicine at the time.

She earned her Master of Divinity from Duke University in 1977, followed by her Doctor of Philosophy in Theology from Vanderbilt University in 1986. Her doctoral dissertation was entitled, "Ecclesial Tradition and Social Praxis: A Study in Theological Method." At Vanderbilt, she studied with theologians Ed Farley and Peter Hodgson. During her doctoral program, she also explored liberation and feminist theologies.

== Career ==
McClintock Fulkerson was ordained in the Concord Presbytery of the PC(U.S.A.) in 1978, after which she moved to the New Hope Presbytery in 1984. She began her career as a Parish Associate Minister of Second Presbyterian Church in Nashville, Tennessee, in 1981. Her husband was a medical fellow at Vanderbilt University Medical Center.

McClintock Fulkerson began her teaching career as an instructor at Duke Divinity School in 1983, making her the only woman on the faculty at the time. Her instructor position at Duke was followed by assistant and associate professorships at Duke and as the E. Rhodes and Leona B. Carpenter Visiting associate professor at Vanderbilt from 2001 to 2003. In 1994, McClintock Fulkerson became the third woman in Duke Divinity School history to be granted tenure. In 2019, as the longest-serving member of the Duke Divinity School faculty, McClintock Fulkerson became a professor emerita.

McClintock Fulkerson has published a number of books and articles. Her 1994 book Changing the Subject: Women's Discourses and Feminist Theology examines the practices of Pentecostal women, white Presbyterian women, and academic feminists as sites of liberation. Her 2007 book Places of Redemption: Theology for a Worldly Church examines ecclesial practices in conversation with racism, ableism, and other forms of systemic injustice. McClintock Fulkerson's most recent book publication is A Body Broken, A Body Betrayed: Race, Memory, and Eucharist in White Dominant Churches, co-written with Marcia Mount Shoop and published in 2016. Her methodology includes anthropology, ethnography, and literary criticism.

McClintock Fulkerson is an ordained minister in the Presbyterian Church (U.S.A.), and a member of the denomination's national Advocacy for Women Task Force. At Duke Divinity School, she is the faculty sponsor of both the Women's Center and the LGBTQ+ student group Sacred Worth, as well as the director of the Program in Gender, Theology, and Ministry. McClintock Fulkerson's teaching interests include practical theology, feminist theologies, contemporary Protestant theology, authority in theology, and ecclesiology. In 2016, student protests for improved conditions for LGBTQ+ students at Duke Divinity School led to the formation of a task force charged with addressing a variety of climate issues. McClintock Fulkerson was appointed to this task force by then-dean Elaine Heath. Recent courses McClintock Fulkerson has taught at Duke Divinity School include "Christ and Culture Theory," "Feminist Theology," "Authority in Theology," and "Contemporary Theology: Selected Figures."

McClintock Fulkerson is currently involved in the "Pauli Murray Project: Activating History for Social Change" through the Duke Human Rights Center. In 2020, she was named one of three 2020 Vanderbilt Divinity School and Graduate Department of Religion Distinguished Alumni/ae.

== Publications ==
=== Books ===
- A Body Broken, A Body Betrayed: Race, Memory, and Eucharist in White-Dominant Churches (co-written with Marcia Mount Shoop, 2016)
- Theological Perspectives on Life, Liberty and the Pursuit of Happiness (co-edited with Ada Maria Isasi-Diaz and Rosemary Carbine, 2013)
- The Oxford Handbook of Feminist Theology (co-edited with Sheila Briggs, 2011)
- Places of Redemption: Theology for a Worldly Church (2007)
- Changing the Subject: Women's Discourses and Feminist Theology (1994)

=== Articles ===
- "Transforming Memory: Re-membering the Eucharist." Theology Today 70, no. 2 (2013)
- "Ethnography: A Gift to Theology and Ethics." Practical Matters 6 (2013)
- "Receiving from the Other: Theology & Grass-Roots Organizing." International Journal of Public Theology 6 (2012)
- "Womyn and the Theological Perspective." Womyn: The Queer Experience (2010)
- "Theology and the Lure of the Practical: An Overview" in Religion Compass (2007)
- "Narrative of a Nice Southern White Girl" in The Poetics of the Sacred and the Politics of Scholarship: Six Geographies of Encounter, Worlds and Knowledges Otherwise (2006)
- "'We Don't See Color Here': A Case Study in Ecclesial-Cultural Invention" in Converging on Culture: Theologians in Dialogue with Cultural Analysis and Criticism (2001)
- "'They Will Know We are Christians by our Regulated Improvisation:' Ecclesial Hybridity and the Unity of the Church" in The Blackwell Companion to Postmodern Theology (2001)
- "Practice" in A Handbook for Postmodern Biblical Interpretation (2000)
- "Feminist Exploration: A Theological Proposal" in International Journal of Practical Theology (1998)
- "Spiritual Geographies" in Cross Currents: Journal of the Association for Religion and Intellectual Life (1998)
- "Is There a (Nonsexist) Bible in This Church? A Feminist Case for Interpretive Communities" in Modern Theology (1998)
- "Contesting the Gendered Subject: A Feminist Account of the Imago Dei" in Horizons in Feminist Theology: Identity, Tradition, and Norms (1997)
- "Changing the Subject: Feminist Theology and Discourse" in Journal of Literature and Theology (1996)
- "Church Documents on Human Sexuality and the Authority of Scripture" in Interpretation 49/1, "Biblical Authority in the Church Today: Human Sexuality as a Test Case" (1995)
- "Gender—Being It or Doing It? The Church, Homosexuality, and the Politics of Identity" in Union Seminary Quarterly Review (1994)
- "Sexism as Original Sin: Developing a Theacentric Discourse" in Journal of the American Academy of Religion (1991)
- "Theological Education and the Problem of Identity" in Modern Theology (1991)
- "Contesting Feminist Canons: Discourse and the Problem of Sexist Texts" in Journal of Feminist Studies in Religion (1991)
