= Friedhelm Nicolin =

- Born: February 10, 1927; Aachen
- Died: November 7, 2007 (aged 80); Röttgen

Academic background
- Education: Bonn University
- Thesis: Grundlinien einer Geisteswissenschaftlichen Pädagogik bei G. W. F. Hegel (1955)

Friedhelm Nicolin (February 10, 1926 – November 7, 2007) was a professor of general pedagogy with a focus on the philosophy of education at the University of Düsseldorf.

== Life and works ==
From 1957 to 1967, he was head of the Hegel Archive. His publications include Pädagogik als Wissenschaft (1969), Der junge Hegel in Stuttgart (1970), Stichwort Bildung (1974) and Auf Hegels Spuren (1996). He authored numerous writings and editions on Hegel's philosophy. He was also co-editor of the Hegel-Studien yearbook from 1961 and of the Kultur und Erkenntnis series from 1984.

=== Selected works ===
- Hegel, G. W. F. (1959). Nicolin, Friedhelm; Pöggeler, Otto (eds.). Enzyklopädie der philosophischen Wissenschaften im Grundrisse (1830). doi:10.1515/9783112531129.
- Nicolin, Friedhelm, ed. (1977). Dokumente und Materialien zur Biographie. doi:10.1515/9783112530986. ISBN 978-3-11-253098-6.
- Hegel, Georg Wilhelm Friedrich (1989). Nicolin, Friedhelm; Schüler, Gisela (eds.). Gesammelte Werke: Frühe Schriften I (in German). Felix Meiner Verlag. ISBN 978-3-7873-0267-3.
