= Luca Corti =

Italian philosophy professor

- Born: 1986 (age 39–40); Prato, Italy

Academic background
- Education: University of Padua (PhD)
- Thesis: Erinnerung. Mente e metodo nella Filosofia dello spirito soggettivo di Hegel (2015)
- Doctoral advisor: Luca Illetterati
- Other advisor: Francesca Menegoni

Academic work
- Era: Contemporary philosophy
- Region: Western philosophy
- School or tradition: German idealism
- Institutions: University of Padua

Luca Corti (born 1986) is an Italian associate professor of philosophy at the University of Padua.

== Life and work ==
Corti studied philosophy in Italy, Germany, and the United States, earning his PhD at the Research Center on Classical German Philosophy of the University of Padua. His research focuses on classical German philosophy, American philosophy, epistemology, and the theory of norms. He has held several postdoctoral fellowships, including a DAAD Postdoctoral Fellowship at the University of Bonn, a Marie Curie COFUND Postdoctoral Fellowship at the University of Louvain, a Swiss Government Excellence Postdoctoral Fellowship at the University of Zurich, and an FCT Postdoctoral Fellowship at the University of Porto.

In 2018, he was awarded a Marie Skłodowska-Curie Individual Fellowship, carried out under the supervision of Luca Illetterati at the Department of Philosophy, Sociology, Education and Applied Psychology.

== Publications ==
- Corti, Luca; Schülein, Johannes-Georg, eds. (2023). Life, Organisms, and Human Nature. Studies in German Idealism. Vol. 22. Springer Cham. doi:10.1007/978-3-031-41558-6. ISBN 978-3-031-41557-9. ISSN 1571-4764.
- Corti, Luca; Schülein, Johannes-Georg, eds. (2022). Nature and Naturalism in Classical German Philosophy. New York: Routledge. doi:10.4324/9781003092056. ISBN 978-1-003-09205-6.
