= Johannes Hoffmeister (philosopher) =

German philosopher (1907–1955)

- Born: 17 December 1907; Heldrungen, German Empire
- Died: 19 October 1955 (aged 47); Bonn, West Germany

Education
- Education: Heidelberg University
- Doctoral advisor: Friedrich Gundolf

Philosophical work
- Era: 20th-century philosophy
- Region: Western philosophy
- School: German idealism
- Institutions: University of Bonn, University of Paris, University of Leipzig
- Doctoral students: Otto Pöggeler
- Notable students: Karl-Otto Apel
- Main interests: Hegel; German literature; philosophy of history

Johannes Hoffmeister (17 December 1907 – 19 October 1955) was a German philosopher and scholar of German literature. He is known for his studies of Georg Wilhelm Friedrich Hegel, as well as of writers such as Johann Wolfgang von Goethe and Friedrich Hölderlin, and is regarded by some scholars as an influential twentieth-century editor of Hegel's manuscripts.

His academic career included teaching appointments in Germany and in occupied France during the Second World War. During the Nazi period, Hoffmeister was affiliated with several National Socialist organizations.

== Early life and education ==
Hoffmeister studied philosophy at Heidelberg under Friedrich Gundolf, completing a dissertation in 1929. He subsequently focused on the history of German idealism.

== Career ==
After completing his dissertation, Hoffmeister began editorial work on Hegel's writings. He transcribed previously unpublished manuscripts on Jenaer Realphilosophie (Lectures 1803/04), held in the Berlin State Library. The project was financed by the Moses Mendelssohn Foundation at the suggestion of Richard Kroner, then president of the International Hegel Congress. Working with Hegel editor Georg Lasson, Hoffmeister published the manuscripts in 1931 and 1932 as part of Lasson's Sämtliche Werke (Complete Works) edition.

From 1932, Hoffmeister worked as a tutor and lecturer for the Felix Meiner publishing house in Leipzig. With funding from the German Association for the Preservation and Promotion of Research (the predecessor of the German Research Foundation (DFG), he published several Hegel editions from 1933 onward. In January 1936, he became an assistant lecturer at the University of Leipzig's Institute of Philosophy but resigned in February 1938 following disagreements with Hermann Glockner. He subsequently took a position as a lexicon editor at the Brockhaus publishing house.

In 1936, Hoffmeister published Dokumente zu Hegels Entwicklung (Documents on Hegel's Development), a compilation of Hegel's early manuscripts and correspondence.

During the Nazi regime, Hoffmeister joined several National Socialist organizations, including the SA in 1936 and the Nazi Party in 1940. He also participated in academic activities organized by the regime, including a philosophical seminar directed by the Amt Rosenberg.

In the spring of 1941, he received his habilitation in modern German literature at the University of Bonn. From March to October 1941, he served as a soldier, and from 1942 to 1944, he taught German literature as a lecturer at the Sorbonne in occupied Paris. He was later interned in an American prisoner-of-war camp in northwestern France until the summer of 1945, when he was released due to illness.

After returning to Germany, Hoffmeister resumed teaching at the University of Bonn in 1946. He was appointed associate professor of modern German language and literature in 1948 and lectured on Renaissance and Baroque literature, Romanticism, Hölderlin, and related topics. In 1953, he began a new edition of Hegel's works, supported by the DFG. His students included the Hegel scholars Otto Pöggeler and Friedhelm Nicolin, as well as Richard Müller, Karl Otto Brogsitter, and Kurt Mueller-Vollmer.

== Death and legacy ==
Hoffmeister died on 19 October 1955 in Bonn at the age of 47.

Hoffmeister's revised edition of Hegel's Lectures on the Philosophy of World History, based on Georg Lasson's earlier work, served as the basis for H. B. Nisbet's 1975 English translation.

In 1955, Hoffmeister published a second, revised edition of the Philosophisches Wörterbuch (Dictionary of Philosophical Terms). The first edition, prepared with preliminary work by Hans Leisegang, had appeared in 1944 and was based on Friedrich Kirchner's Wörterbuch der Philosophischen Grundbegriffe (Dictionary of Basic Philosophical Concepts). Hoffmeister had begun revisions in the 1930s.

He also published several studies on Goethe, including an interpretation of the latter's "Fairy Tale." A work on Hölderlin and a biography of Hegel remained unfinished at the time of his death. A collection of lectures he gave while interned as a prisoner of war—on Meister Eckhart, Kant, Goethe, Schiller, Hegel, and Hölderlin—was later published as Heimkehr des Geistes (1946).

== Works ==
=== Writings ===
- Goethe und der deutsche Idealismus. Leipzig, 1932
- Hölderlin und die Philosophie. Habilitation. Leipzig, 1932
- Goethes „Urworte-Orphisch". Eine Interpretation. Tübingen, 1930
- Die Problematik des Völkerbundes bei Kant und Hegel. Tübingen, 1934
- Friedrich Hölderlin, 1770–1843. Institut Allemand, Paris 1943
- Die Heimkehr des Geistes. Studien zur Dichtung und Philosophie der Goethezeit, 1946
- Die Vernunft in Der Geschichte (Philosophische Studientexte), 1956
- Vorlesungen über die Philosophie der Weltgeschichte

=== Hegel editions ===
- Hegels sämtliche Werke. 18 Volumes. 1905 (Editor following Georg Lasson);
  - Jenenser Realphilosophie. Aus dem Manuskript hrsg. von Johannes Hoffmeister. Meiner, Leipzig, 1931–1932 (Hegel: Sämtliche Werke; 19. 20 / Philosophische Bibliothek; [Neue Ausg.] 66 a. b. 67: [vielm. c!])
- Hegel. Neue Kritische Ausgabe im Rahmen der Philosophischen Bibliothek bei Felix Meiner, Hamburg, from 1953
- Briefe von und an Hegel. Volumes 1–3, 1951–1954
- Briefe von und an Hegel. Volume 4
- Dokumente zu Hegels Entwicklung. Stuttgart, 1936

=== Further editions ===
- Johann Wolfgang von Goethe: Die Wahlverwandtschaften. Unterhaltungen deutscher Ausgewanderten. Das Märchen. Die guten Weiber. Novelle. Reise der Söhne Megaprazons. Bruchstück eines Romans in Briefen. Ed. Joh. Hoffmeister. Mainzer Presse, Mainz/Weimar, 1932 / Insel, Leipzig, 1939 (Welt-Goethe-Ausgabe)
- Johann Wolfgang Goethe: Das Märchen. Mit Einführung und Anhang. Iserlohn, 1948
- Heinrich von Kleist: Der zerbrochene Krug. Schulausgabe. Köln, 1950

=== Dictionary ===
- as editor.: Wörterbuch der philosophischen Begriffe. (= Philosophische Bibliothek. Band 225). Begründet von Friedrich Kirchner. Vollständig neu bearbeitet. Meiner, Hamburg, 1944, DNB-IDN 580216144
- as editor.: Wörterbuch der philosophischen Begriffe. (= Philosophische Bibliothek. Band 225). Second Edition. Verlag von Felix Meiner, Hamburg, 1955, DNB-IDN 452069270
