= Walter Jaeschke =

German philosopher (1945–2022)

- Born: 20 September 1945; Amberg, Germany
- Died: 14 July 2022 (aged 76)
- Occupations: Professor of philosophy, director of the Hegel-Archiv

Academic background
- Education: Free University of Berlin (Dr. phil.); Technical University of Berlin; Ruhr-Universität Bochum (Dr. phil. hab.)
- Theses: Die Suche nach den eschatologischen Wurzeln der Geschichtsphilosophie. Eine historische Kritik der Säkularisierungsthese (1976); Die Vernunft in der Religion. Studien zur Grundlegung der Religionsphilosophie Hegels (1986)

Academic work
- Discipline: Philosophy
- Institutions: Ruhr-Universität Bochum, German Academy of Sciences at Berlin, Free University of Berlin

Walter Jaeschke (20 September 1945 – 14 July 2022) was a German philosopher, alongside Georg Lasson and Johannes Hofmeister was one the biggest editors and commentators of classical German philosophy, especially Friedrich Heinrich Jacobi and Georg Wilhelm Friedrich Hegel. He is known in particular for his scholarship on Hegel's philosophy of religion.

== Life and works ==
Educated at Free University of Berlin and the Technical University of Berlin, where he studied philosophy, history of religion, and sinology.

Jaeschke earned his doctorate in 1976 with the dissertation Die Suche nach den eschatologischen Wurzeln der Geschichtsphilosophie. Eine historische Kritik der Säkularisierungsthese at the Free University of Berlin. His habilitation took place a decade later at the Ruhr-Universität Bochum with the study Die Vernunft in der Religion. Studien zur Grundlegung der Religionsphilosophie Hegels (Stuttgart 1986).

From 1974 to 1989, Jaeschke worked as a research associate at the Hegel Archives of the Ruhr-Universität, and from 1989 to 1998, he worked as a research associate at the Berlin-Brandenburg Academy of Sciences. He was also an extraordinary professor at the Institute of Philosophy at the Free University of Berlin. From 1998 until his retirement in 2010, he worked as a professor of philosophy with a special focus on German Idealism at the Ruhr-Universität Bochum, as well as the director of the Hegel Archive there, where the critical edition of Hegel's works is being developed. In 2014, he was elected as a corresponding member of the North Rhine-Westphalian Academy of Sciences, Humanities and the Arts.

He directed the critical Gesammelte Werke edition of the work of Georg Wilhelm Friedrich Hegel. He also co-directed critical editions of the works of Friedrich Heinrich Jacobi and Friedrich Daniel Ernst Schleiermacher.

== Works ==
- (1976). Die Suche nach den eschatologischen Wurzeln der Geschichtsphilosophie. Eine historische Kritik der Säkularisierungsthese [The search for the eschatological roots of the philosophy of history. A historical critique of the secularisation thesis]. Munich: Kaiser, ISBN 3-459-01067-3.
- (1983). Die Religionsphilosophie Hegels [Hegel's philosophy of religion]. Darmstadt: Wissenschaftliche Buchgesellschaft, ISBN 3-534-07007-0 (Japanese translation 1990).
- (1986). Die Vernunft in der Religion. Studien zur Grundlegung der Religionsphilosophie Hegels [Reason in religion. Studies on the foundations of Hegel's philosophy of religion]. Stuttgart-Bad Cannstatt: Frommann-Holzboog, ISBN 3-7728-1188-4 (English translation 1990, see below).
- (2003). Hegel-Handbuch: Leben – Werk – Schule [Companion on Hegel. Life – Work – School]. Stuttgart: Metzler, ISBN 3-476-01705-2 (new editions 2010 and 2016; Japanese translation 2007).
- with Andreas Arndt (2012). Die klassische deutsche Philosophie nach Kant. Systeme der reinen Vernunft und ihre Kritik 1785–1845 [Classical German philosophy after Kant. Systems of pure reason and their critique 1785–1845]. Munich: Beck, ISBN 978-3-406-63046-0.
- with Andreas Arndt (2013). Die Philosophie der Neuzeit: Klassische deutsche Philosophie von Fichte bis Hegel [The Philosophy of the Modern Age: Classical German Philosophy from Fichte to Hegel]. Munich: Beck, ISBN 978-3-406-55134-5 (Czech translation 2016).
- (2020). Hegels Philosophie [Hegel's Philosophy]. Hamburg: Meiner, ISBN 978-3-7873-3704-0.

=== Translations into English ===
- Jaeschke, Walter (1990). Reason in Religion : The Foundations of Hegel's Philosophy of Religion. Internet Archive. Berkeley : University of California Press. ISBN 978-0-520-06518-5.
