= Ludwig Siep =

German philosopher

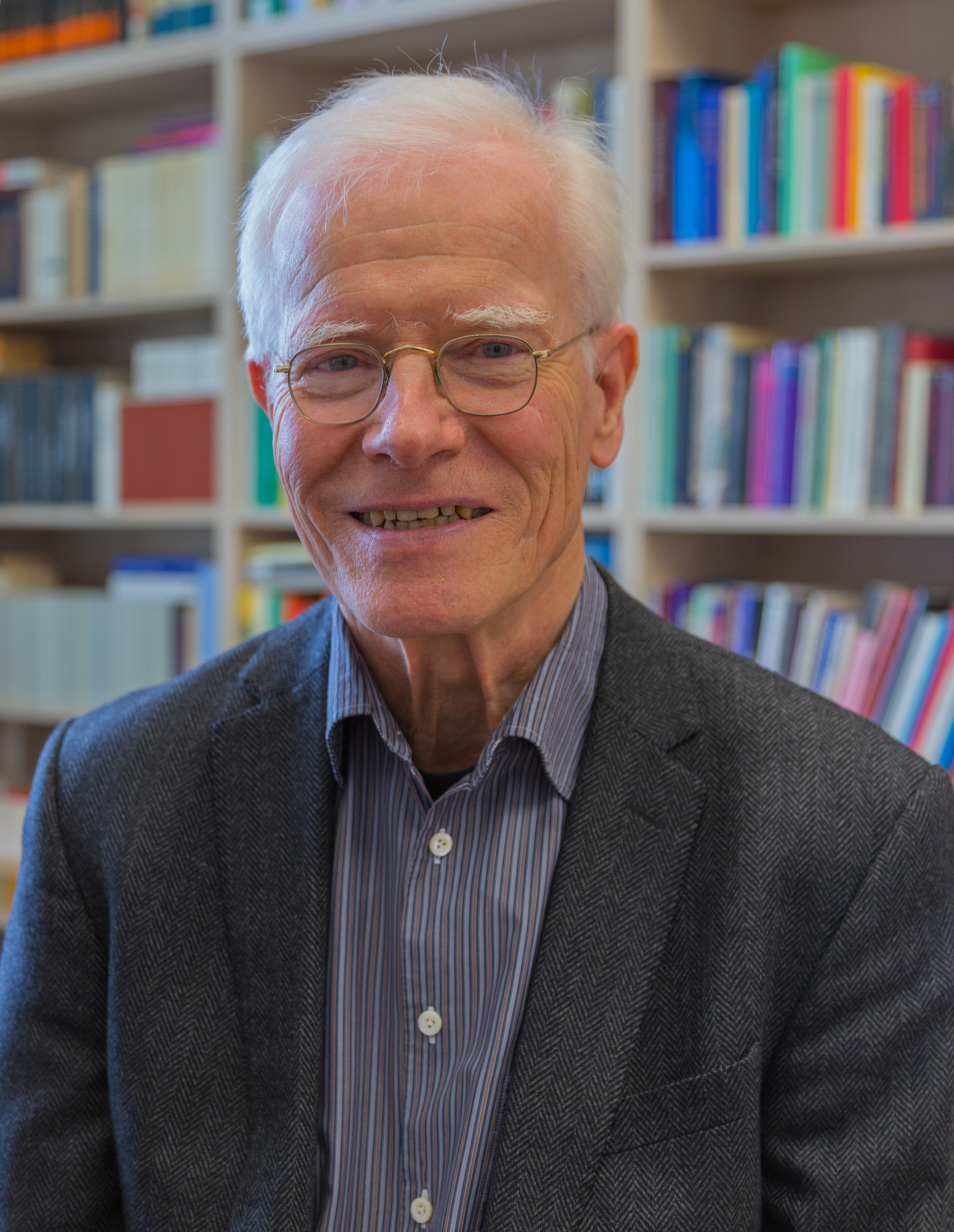
- Born: 1942 (age 83–84); Solingen, Germany

Education
- Theses: Anerkennung als Prinzip der Praktischen Philosophie. Untersuchungen zu Hegels Jenaer Philosophie des Geistes (1974); Hegels Fichtekritik und die Wissenschaftslehre von 1804 (1969)
- Doctoral advisor: Werner Marx

Philosophical work
- Era: Contemporary philosophy
- Region: Western philosophy
- School: German idealism
- Institutions: University of Münster
- Doctoral students: Michael Quante
- Main interests: Practical philosophy,
- Notable ideas: Recognition as a principle of practical philosophy

Ludwig Siep (born November 2, 1942) is a German philosopher.

== Biography ==
Ludwig Siep grew up in Cologne and graduated from Dreikönigsgymnasium in 1962. As a scholarship holder of the German Academic Scholarship Foundation (Studienstiftung), He studied philosophy, education, German studies, history and political science at the University of Cologne and the University of Freiburg. Siep completed his doctorate at the University of Freiburg in 1969 under Werner Marx with the dissertation Hegels Fichtekritik und die Wissenschaftslehre von 1804. He then took up an assistant position at the Philosophy Department there until 1978. He earned his habilitation in philosophy at the same university in 1976 with his thesis Anerkennung als Prinzip der praktischen Philosophie. Untersuchungen zu Hegels Jenaer Philosophie des Geistes.

From 1979 to 1986, Siep was a full professor at the University of Duisburg-Essen and then professor and director of the Philosophy Department at the University of Münster from 1986 to 2011. Siep gave his farewell lecture on January 31, 2011, on the subject of "Moral und Gottesbild" (Morality and the Image of God).

From 1988 to 1992, Siep worked as an expert reviewer for the history of philosophy at the DFG (German Research Foundation).

In 2007, Ludwig Siep was elected chairman of the Hegel Commission of the North Rhine-Westphalian Academy of Sciences, Humanities and the Arts. The commission supervises the critical Hegel edition, which is published by the Hegel-Archiv of the Ruhr-University Bochum.

== Selected works ==
=== In English ===
- Siep, Ludwig (2014). Hegel's Phenomenology of Spirit. Cambridge University Press. doi:10.1017/CBO9781139136372. ISBN 9781139136372.
