= Contemporary Art Museum St. Louis =

Art museum in Saint Louis, Missouri

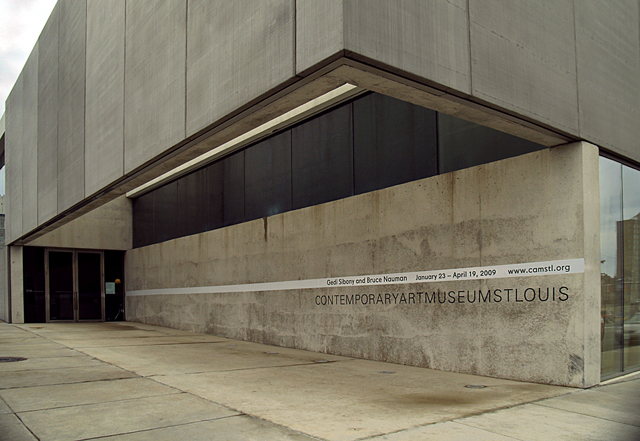
- Entryway of the Contemporary Art Museum St. Louis
- Established: 1980
- Location: St. Louis, Missouri
- Coordinates: 38.6405°N 90.2350°W
- Type: Art museum
- Director: Lisa Melandri
- Public transit access: MetroBus
- Website: camstl.org

The Contemporary Art Museum St. Louis is an art museum for contemporary art, located in St. Louis, Missouri. Known informally as the CAM St. Louis, the museum is located at 3750 Washington Boulevard in the Grand Center Arts District. The building is designed by the American architect Brad Cloepfil.

The institution that would become CAM was established in 1980, and operated under a number of names including First Street Forum and the Forum for Contemporary Art. On September 19, 2003, the Contemporary Art Museum St. Louis moved to the new building in the Grand Center Arts and Entertainment District in midtown St. Louis.

The Contemporary Art Museum St. Louis is a non- collecting museum that hosts no permanent art exhibitions. The museum has mounted more than 120 exhibitions and exhibited over 260 artists. It usually shows six Main Gallery exhibitions each year of American and international artists. It has exhibited work by Richard Aldrich, Laylah Ali, Lutz Bacher, Rosa Barba, Leslie Hewitt, Hayv Kahraman, Wyatt Kahn, Elad Lassry, Marilyn Minter, Gedi Sibony, Carey Young, Richard Artschwager, Jim Hodges, Sean Landers, Cindy Sherman, Arcangelo Sassolino, and Amy Sherald.

== History ==
In 2016, Jefferey Uslip resigned from the chief curator position at the Contemporary Art Museum St. Louis due to criticism about a controversial exhibition. The ongoing criticism of Kelley Walker's seemingly racially insensitive exhibit "Direct Drive" caused more than twenty artists to withdraw from the Contemporary Art Museum St. Louis's annual open studio tour.

== Architecture ==
Paul Ha, the director of the museum, had an idea of trends he wished to display but didn't plan on which exhibits/collections he wanted to showcase, so the architects had little to no idea on what type of spaces to create. The architects came up with a plan to create a space that is able to convey its own energy and calm feelings. With a budget of $6.5 million, the architects and director worked together to create a rather bland structure, the reason for this being that Paul Ha wished for artists to be able to use all areas of the museum to display their work. Local architects questioned the design by claiming that it looked too much like a fortress with little to no indication of original design.
