= H. Busso Peus =

German jurist and politician

Hugo Busso Peus
- Tomb of Busso Peus in the Central Cemetery of Münster
- Born: 17 September 1839
- Died: 2 December 1893 (aged 54)
- Occupations: jurist and politician

Hugo Busso Peus (17 September 1839 – 2 December 1893) was a German jurist and politician.

== Life ==
Peus, son of Hugo Peus, father of Friedrich-Carl Peus and grandfather of the two cousins politician Busso Peus and numismatist Busso Peus (24 October 1902 – 18 November 1983), studied law at Humboldt University of Berlin and at the Catholic University of Leuven, Belgium, and—succeeding his father—became a solicitor and barrister.

In 1879, he moved his law office to Münster, the capital of Westphalia at the time. Thereupon, he served as a notary as well. In 1890, he was appointed Royal Legal Counsel (Königlich Preußischer Justizrat) by Wilhelm II, the King of Prussia.

Peus was a member of the Catholic Centre Party and at the front line in the political struggle known as the Kulturkampf. In 1891, after the Party's chairman Ludwig Windthorst had died, Peus was offered by the Centre Party to take over Windthorst's seat in the Imperial Parliament in Berlin—an offer Peus declined as being incompatible with running his law office in Münster.
