= Otto Pöggeler =

German philosopher (1928–2014)

- Born: 12 December 1928; Attendorn, Weimar Germany
- Died: 10 December 2014 (aged 85); Bochum, Germany

Education
- Education: University of Bonn (PhD); Heidelberg University (Dr. phil. hab.)
- Theses: Hegels Kritik der Romantik (1955); Hegels Jugendschriften und die Idee einer Phänomenologie des Geistes (1966)
- Doctoral advisor: Johannes Hoffmeister (PhD advisor); Hans-Georg Gadamer (Dr. phil. hab. advisor)

Philosophical work
- Era: Contemporary philosophy
- Region: Western philosophy
- School: Phenomenology
- Institutions: Ruhr University Bochum

Signature
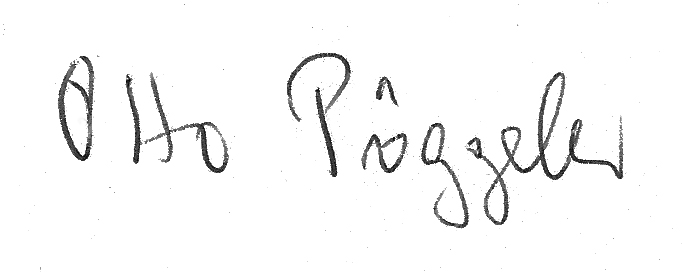

Otto Pöggeler (12 December 1928 – 10 December 2014) was a German philosopher. He specialized in phenomenology and commenting on Heidegger. In 1963 he authored the acclaimed Martin Heidegger’s Path of Thinking, one of the first rigorous attempts at tracing the development of Heidegger's thought. He also published a study of poetry of Paul Celan, and was director of the Hegel-Archiv at the Ruhr University in Bochum.

== Life and work ==
Otto Pöggeler completed his Abitur at the Rivius-Gymnasium in his hometown of Attendorn. He studied philosophy and in 1955 earned his doctorate (Dr. phil.) in German studies at the University of Bonn under Johannes Hoffmeister with a dissertation on Hegels Kritik der Romantik (expanded edition published in Munich, 1999). In 1966, he completed his habilitation in philosophy at the University of Heidelberg under Hans-Georg Gadamer and began teaching there as a lecturer. His habilitation thesis on Hegels Jugendschriften und die Idee einer Phänomenologie des Geistes was partially published by him (Hegels Idee einer Phänomenologie des Geistes, 1973; Hegel-Studien).

== Bibliography ==
- Martin Heidegger's Path of Thinking (Contemporary Studies in Philosophy and the Human Science), translated by Daniel Magurshak and Sigmund Barber, 1987
- The Paths of Heidegger's Life and Thought (Contemporary Studies in Philosophy and the Human Sciences), translated by John Bailiff, 1997
- Hegels Kritik der Romantik. 1956. 2. überarbeitete Auflage. Wilhelm Fink Verlag, München 1999, ISBN 978-3-7705-3343-5
- Der Denkweg Martin Heideggers. Neske, Pfullingen 1963, 2. Auflage 1983. 3., erw. Auflage 1990, 4., erw. Auflage 1994. ISBN 3-7885-0328-9 (Übersetzungen in die meisten europäisch-amerikanischen und ostasiatischen Sprachen; u. a. Koreanisch: Seoul 1993; Chinesisch: Peking 1994)
- Philosophie und Politik bei Heidegger. Alber, Freiburg / München 1972, 2. Auflage 1974. ISBN 3-495-47261-4
- Hegels Idee einer Phänomenologie des Geistes. Alber, Freiburg / München 1973, 2. Auflage 1993. ISBN 3-495-47780-2
- Hrsg.: Hegel. Einführung in seine Philosophie. Kolleg Philosophie. Alber, Freiburg / München 1977. ISBN 978-3-495-47354-2
- Heidegger und die hermeneutische Philosophie. Alber, Freiburg / München 1983. ISBN 978-3-495-47532-4 (Italienisch: Napoli 1994)
- Die Frage nach der Kunst. Von Hegel zu Heidegger. Alber, Freiburg / München 1984. ISBN 978-3-495-47555-3
- Hrsg.: Heidegger. Perspektiven zur Deutung seines Werks. 1984. 3., ergänzte Auflage 1994. Beltz Athenäum, Weinheim 1984. ISBN 3-89547-010-4
- Spur des Worts. Zur Lyrik Paul Celans. Alber, Freiburg / München 1986. ISBN 978-3-495-47607-9
- Neue Wege mit Heidegger. Alber, Freiburg / München 1992. ISBN 978-3-495-47719-9
- Schritte zu einer hermeneutischen Philosophie. Alber, Freiburg / München 1994. ISBN 978-3-495-47782-3
- Heidegger in seiner Zeit. Wilhelm Fink Verlag, München 1999. ISBN 978-3-7705-3390-9
- Hegels Kritik der Romantik. Wilhelm Fink Verlag, München 1999. ISBN 978-3-7705-3343-5
- Der Stein hinterm Aug. Studien zu Celans Gedichten. Wilhelm Fink Verlag, München 2000. ISBN 978-3-7705-3466-1
- Bild und Technik . Heidegger, Klee und die moderne Kunst. Wilhelm Fink Verlag, Paderborn 2002. ISBN 978-3-7705-3675-7
- Schicksal und Geschichte. Antigone im Spiegel der Deutungen und Gestaltungen seit Hegel und Hölderlin. Wilhelm Fink Verlag, Paderborn 2004. ISBN 978-3-7705-4047-1
- Europa come destino e come compito. Correzioni nella filosofia ermeneutica. Guerini e Associati, Milano 2008. ISBN 978-88-6250-006-7
- Philosophie und hermeneutische Theologie. Heidegger, Bultmann und die Folgen. Wilhelm Fink Verlag, Paderborn 2009. ISBN 978-3-7705-4403-5
- Wege in schwieriger Zeit. Ein Lebensbericht. Wilhelm Fink Verlag, Paderborn 2011. ISBN 978-3-7705-5123-1
