= Mark Sacks =

British philosopher (1953–2008)

Mark D. Sacks
- Born: 29 December 1953
- Died: 17 June 2008 (aged 54)
- Occupation: Philosopher

Mark D. Sacks (29 December 1953 – 17 June 2008) was a British philosopher best known for his work on Kant, Post-Kantian idealism, and the epistemological tradition in European Philosophy. He was one of the few philosophers in Britain who sought to integrate the Analytic philosophy tradition with Continental philosophy.

He founded the European Journal of Philosophy in 1993, which is now a leading venue for work on Continental philosophy. He was a professor of philosophy at the University of Essex until his death.

His first degree was in philosophy, at Hebrew University of Jerusalem. He obtained a doctorate in philosophy from King's College, Cambridge, under the supervision of Bernard Williams.

He died from prostate cancer at the age of 54.

== Work ==
- Objectivity and Insight (2003)
- The World We Found (1989)
