= Röttgen =

Röttgen is a surname. Notable people with the surname include:

- Norbert Röttgen (born 1965), German lawyer and politician
- Wil Röttgen (born 1966), German actor
