= Rolf-Peter Horstmann =

German philosopher (born 1940)

- Born: 1940 (age 85–86); Wernigerode, Germany

Education
- Education: University of Tübingen; University of Vienna; Free University of Berlin; Heidelberg University (PhD)
- Theses: Hegels vorphänomenologische Entwürfe zu einer Philosophie der Subjektivität in Beziehung auf die Kritik an den Prinzipien der Reflexionsphilosophie (1968); Ontologie und Relationen. Hegel, Bradley, Russell über interne und externe Beziehungen (1979)

Philosophical work
- Era: Contemporary philosophy
- Region: Western philosophy
- School: German idealism
- Institutions: Ruhr University Bochum; Bielefeld University; LMU Munich; Humboldt University of Berlin
- Main interests: Epistemology, metaphysics
- Notable ideas: Interpretation of Hegel's Phenomenology as an argument for a monistic ontology

Rolf-Peter Horstmann (born December 5, 1940) is a German emeritus professor of philosophy. His fields of activity are primarily ontology and epistemology, as well as the philosophy of Kant and German idealism, especially Hegel.

== Life ==
From 1960, Horstmann studied philosophy, history and Greek studies at the University of Tübingen, the University of Vienna, the Free University of Berlin and Heidelberg University. He received his doctorate from Heidelberg in 1968. After five years in Hegel-Archiv at the Ruhr University Bochum, from 1973 to 1979, he was at the Bielefeld University. From 1974, he also held a two-year lectureship at the University of Göttingen. In 1979, he habilitated for philosophy at Bielefeld. In 1979–80, he held a lectureship at the University of Marburg and in 1980–81 a substitute professorship in Göttingen.

From 1981, he received a scholarship from the German Research Foundation, and was a research fellow at the University of California, Berkeley in 1981–82. Bielefeld University appointed him associate professor of philosophy in 1983. In 1986, he moved to a professorship at LMU Munich.

After a temporary professorship at the University of Potsdam (1994–95), he was appointed to the chair of history of philosophy and German idealism at the Humboldt University of Berlin in 1995. During 1996–1998 and 2002–2004, he was managing director of the university's Institut für Philosophie. In 1997–98, he was the dean and in 1998–2000 the vice dean of the Faculty of Philosophy. In 2007, he became an emeritus professor, retiring in October 2007. Since then, he has held visiting professorships at various universities, mainly in the U.S.

== Visiting professorships ==
- University of California, Berkeley (1984, 2008)
- University of Pennsylvania (from 1993)
- Dartmouth College (2000)
- Universidade Federal de Santa Catarina (2002, 2011)
- Princeton University (2002/03)
- Johns Hopkins University (2010)
- New York University (2011)
- Fudan-Universität (2012)
- Brown University (2013)

== Publications in English ==
=== Monographs ===
- Horstmann, Rolf-Peter (2024). From Apparent to True Knowledge: Transitions in Hegel's Phenomenology of Spirit. frommann-holzboog. ISBN 978-3-7728-3536-0.
- Horstmann, Rolf-Peter (2018). Kant's Power of Imagination. Cambridge University Press. doi:10.1017/9781108565066. ISBN 9781108565066.

=== Editions ===
- Guyer, Paul; Horstmann, Rolf-Peter (2023). Idealism in Modern Philosophy. Oxford University Press. doi:10.1093/oso/9780192848574.001.0001. ISBN 9780191943874.

=== Articles ===
- Horstmann, Rolf-Peter (2010). "The Limited Significance of Self-Consciousness". Revue de Métaphysique et de Morale (4): 435–454. ISSN 0035-1571. JSTOR 27975797.
