= Werner Marx =

German philosopher (1910–1994)

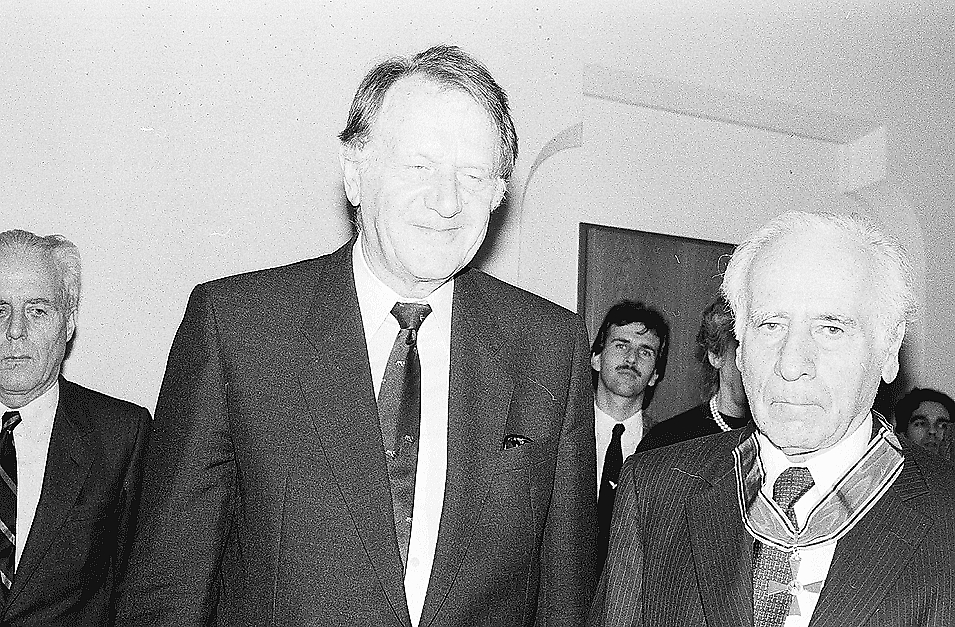
Werner Marx (right) is awarded the Federal Cross of Merit by Helmut Engler (1988)

Werner Marx (19 September 1910, Mülheim – 21 November 1994, Bollschweil Priory) was a German philosopher and expert on Heidegger's thought. He taught at the University of Freiburg.

== Selected publications ==
- The Meaning of Aristotle's "Ontology", Den Haag 1954
- Hegel's Phenomenology of spirit, its point and purpose : a commentary on the preface and introduction. Internet Archive. New York : Harper & Row. 1975. ISBN 978-0-06-065463-4.
- Towards a Phenomenological Ethics, New York 1992
