= Francesca Menegoni =

Italian philosopher (1950-)

Francesca Menegoni (born 1950) is an Italian philosopher and Honorary professor of philosophy at the University of Padua.

== Selected works ==
=== Edited volumes ===
- "Wirklichkeit : Beiträge zu einem Schlüsselbegriff der Hegelschen Philosophie : Hegel-Tagung in Padua im Juni 2015". Deutsche Digitale Bibliothek (in German).

=== Monographs ===
- Menegoni, Francesca (1982). Moralità e morale in Hegel (in Italian). Liviana. ISBN 978-88-7675-218-6.
- Menegoni, Francesca (1993). Soggetto e struttura dell'agire in Hegel.

=== Articles ===
- Menegoni, Francesca (2016). "Hegel's Theory of Action: Between Conviction and Recognition". "I that is We, We that is I." Perspectives on Contemporary Hegel. pp. 147–156. doi:10.1163/9789004322967_009. ISBN 978-90-04-32296-7.
