= Fritz Peus =

German entomologist (1904–1978)

Friedrich Ferdinand Christian Peus or Fritz Peus ( 22 April 1904, Siegen- 17 November 1978, Berlin ) was a German entomologist who specialised in Coleoptera, Diptera and Siphonaptera. He was a specialist on the fleas.

Peus was born in Siegen and from 1923 to 1927 Peus studied zoology, botany and physics at the University of Münster. He received a doctorate in 1927 and specialized in blood-sucking Diptera. During the Third Reich, Peus was engaged as an Army entomologist and was employed in malaria research alongside Eduard May in Dachau. He had joined the NSDAP party in 1940. Peus was later Director of the Museum für Naturkunde Berlin becoming curator of Diptera and Siphonaptera in 1949. He was also Professor for special zoology at the Humboldt University of Berlin and from 1962 up to his retirement in 1969 Professor of applied zoology at the Freie Universität Berlin.

Peus had a personal flea collection of nearly 9700 slides which included type specimens. He described two genera and nearly 66 species. This collection is now in the Muséum d’histoire naturelle de Genève.

== Works ==
partial list

- Erich Martini, Fritz Peus, Werner Reichmuth (1952) Lehrbuch der medizinischen Entomologie Jena : G. Fischer
- Peus F. (1958) 10a. Tanyderidae 10b. Liriopeidae.Lindner E. (Ed.) Die Fliegen der paläarktischen Region, 3, Lieferung 200: 1–44.
- Peus F. (1960) Zur Kenntnis der ornithoparasitischen Phormiinen (Diptera, Calliphoridae) Deutsche Entomologische Zeitschrift Volume 7, Issue 3, pages 193–235, 1960 DOI: 10.1002/mmnd.19600070302
- Peus F. (2003) Stechmücken. (= Die Neue Brehm – Bücherei. Band 22). Hohenwarsleben 2003, ISBN 3-89432-516-X. (Nachdruck der Auflage von 1951 bei Westarp-Wissenschaften-Verlagsgesellschaft)
