= Hugo Peus =

German jurist and politician

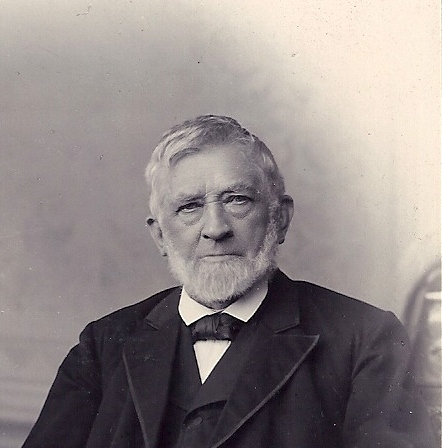
Königlicher Notar Hugo Peus

Hugo Peus (7 September 1809 – 13 July 1898) was a German jurist and politician.

== Life ==
Peus, son of Friedrich Peus and father of H. Busso Peus, studied law at Humboldt University of Berlin. Following his father, he became a solicitor and barrister and notary in Recklinghausen and was subsequently appointed Royal Prussian Legal Counsel (Königlich Preußischer Justizrat) by the King of Prussia.

Peus was a member of the City Council of Recklinghausen. From 1851 to 1852 he served as Acting Mayor of the City of Recklinghausen.

In 1881, he was appointed honorary citizen of Recklinghausen.

== Literature ==
Preussisches Staatsministerium: Handbuch über den Königlich Preussischen Hof und Staat, ISBN 1-147-32162-0
