= Luca Illetterati =

Luca Illetterati (born 1963) is a professor of theoretical philosophy at the University of Padua.

== Life and work ==
In 1987, Illetterati earned an M.A. in Philosophy from the University of Padova and was a Visiting Scholar at the University of Regensburg, working under the supervision of Imre Toth in the fields of Philosophy and History of Science. In 1992, he was a visiting scholar at LMU Munich, under the guidance of Rolf-Peter Horstmann. In 1993, he completed his PhD in Philosophy at the University of Padua.

=== Selected publications ===
==== As Editor ====
- Illetterati, Luca; Miolli, Giovanna (2021-12-16). The Relevance of Hegel’s Concept of Philosophy: From Classical German Philosophy to Contemporary Metaphilosophy. Bloomsbury Publishing. ISBN 978-1-350-16261-7.
- Illetterati, Luca; Menegoni, Francesca, eds. (2018). Wirklichkeit. Beiträge zu einem Schlüsselbegriff der Hegelschen Philosophie: Hegel-Tagung in Padua im Juni 2015. Klostermann. doi:10.5771/9783465106647. ISBN 978-3-465-10664-7.
- Illetterati, Luca; Michelini, Francesca, eds. (2013-05-02). Purposiveness: Teleology Between Nature and Mind (in German). De Gruyter. doi:10.1515/9783110321241. ISBN 978-3-11-032124-1.

==== Articles ====
- Gambarotto, Andrea; Illetterati, Luca (2020). "Hegel's Philosophy of Biology? A Programmatic Overview". Hegel Bulletin. 41 (3): 349–370. doi:10.1017/hgl.2020.21. ISSN 2051-5367.
- "Between Science and Wisdom". Croatian Journal of Philosophy. 5 (3): 487–504. 2005-11-01. doi:10.5840/croatjphil20055311 (inactive 3 August 2025).
