= Friedrich-Carl Peus =

German jurist and politician

Friedrich-Carl Peus (9 September 1871 – 17 December 1950) was a German jurist and politician.

== Life ==
Peus, son of H. Busso Peus and father of Busso Peus, studied law at the universities of Bonn, Freiburg, Lausanne and Berlin and became a solicitor and barrister as well as a notary in Münster.

Friedrich married Hedwig Peus (born Koppers) at age 27.

In 1905, he was elected to the City Council of Münster as a member of the Catholic Centre Party. From 1929 to 1933, during the Great Depression, he was chosen as chairman of the City Council (Stadtverordnetenvorsteher) before he was removed from office by the Nazis.

After the end of World War II he was appointed Mayor of Münster (Oberbürgermeister) by the Allied Powers at the suggestion of Clemens August Count von Galen, the Bishop of Münster.

== Literature ==
Franz-Josef Jakobi: Geschichte der Stadt Münster, Volume 3, Aschendorff 1994, ISBN 978-3-402-05370-6
