= Wil Röttgen =

German actor (born 1966)

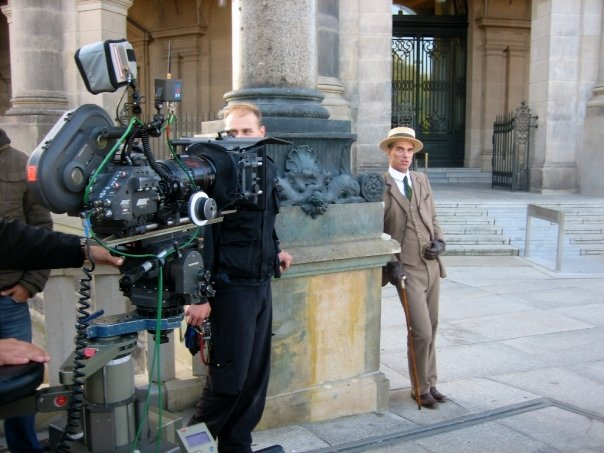
- Wil Röttgen during the shooting of the Porsche-Advertising SPEEDMASTER in 2012.
- Born: Wil Röttgen; September 20, 1966 (age 59); Bonn
- Occupation: Actor
- Years active: 1999—present

Wil Röttgen (born September 20, 1966 in Bonn) is a German actor.

== Life ==
Wil Röttgen studied acting at the Lee Strasberg Theatre Institute London and subsequently performed at various British theatres such as the Barons Court Theatre, the Landor Theatre, the Rosemary Branch Theatre, the Peacock Theatre and the Kings Head in London.

Röttgen had his first film role in 1990 in a BBC production. Since then, he has appeared in various feature films, television movies, and television series, including the miniseries Band of Brothers , Dinotopia , Beyond the Sea , SOKO Kitzbühel , and SOKO Wismar (both ZDF ). Since 2015, Röttgen has been working with LA acting coach Ivana Chubback.

He has been married to Wei SHI (Chongqing/China) since 2012 and they have two children.

== Film career ==
- 999 (1990)
- seaQuest DSV (1994)
- Band of Brothers (2001)
- Bahama Mama (2001)
- Spy Game (2001)
- Charlotte Gray (2001)
- Dinotopia (2002)
- Berlin, Berlin (2002)
- Der Fluch des schwarzen Schwans (2003)
- Beyond the Sea - Musik war sein Leben (2004)
- Aeon Flux (2005)
- SOKO Kitzbühel (2005)
- Anna und die Liebe (2009)
- SOKO Wismar (2009)
- War Horse (2011)
- Falsch (independent feature) (2012)

== Producer ==
- 2001: Bahama Mama (Raindance Award Winning Short Film)
- 2008: Charlie (Nominated at the Los Angeles Short Film Festival)

== Director ==
- 2008: Charlie (Nominated at the Los Angeles Short Film Festival)
