= Erich Martini =

German physician, zoologist and malariologist

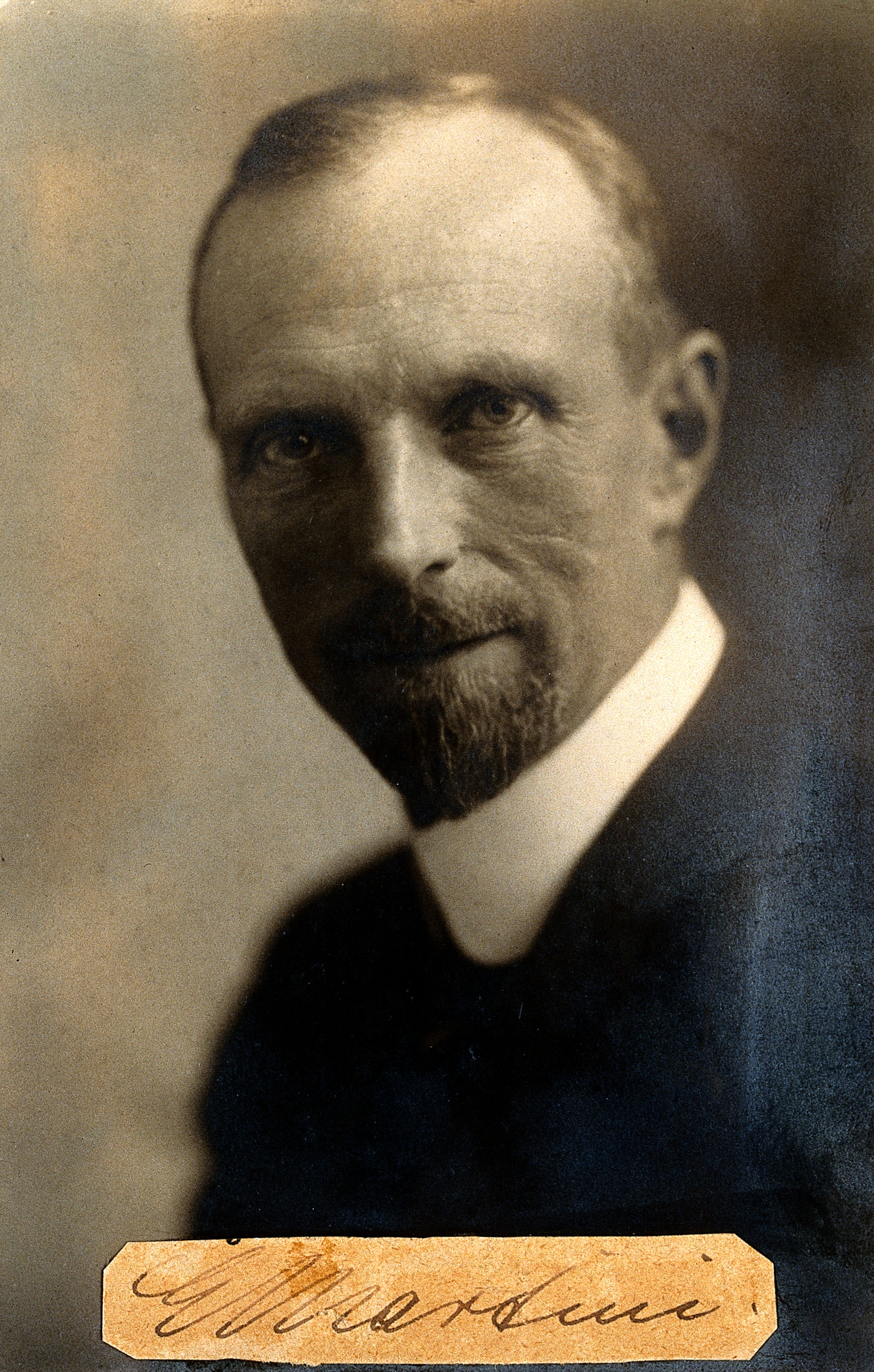
Erich Martini

Erich Christian Wilhelm Martini (19 March 1880 – 5 December 1960) was a German physician, zoologist and malariologist. A staunch supporter of the Nazi Party, he studied typhus and malaria vectors. He served as a director of the entomology department of the Ship and Tropical Diseases Institute in Hamburg. It has been claimed that he may have been involved in biological warfare experiments to spread malaria on the Pontine marshes of Italy.

== Life and work ==
Martini was born in Rostock, son of Carl (1845–1907), who was a regional court president and Agnes (Caroline Christina) née Kessler (1855–1881). Educated at Rostock and Schwerin, he went to study medicine at the universities at Rostock, Tübingen and Munich, graduating in 1905. He then received a doctorate from Rostock under Oswald Seeliger (1889–1907) on nematode development. He habilitated in 1908 at the University of Rostock. In 1912, he joined the Institute for Tropical Medicine in Hamburg. In 1913-14, he visited the United States. During World War I, he served as a physician on the Eastern Front, dealing with typhus and malaria. He examined the difference in typhus mortality among Christians and Jews. He later suggested that Jews were the primary victims and the spreaders of the disease. In 1919 he became director of the department of entomology at the Hamburg institute.

Martini joined the NSDAP in September 1933 and also became a member of the National Socialist lecturers' association. In 1940, he became a staff physician and teacher at the Military Medical Academy in Berlin. When Heinrich Himmler set up an entomological institute under the Ahnenerbe, Martini and Peter Mühlens were proposed as directors by Wolfram Sievers. Himmler had reservations against those trained as physicians and sought a zoologist, finally appointing Eduard May (1905–1956) but Martini was made a member of the advisory board. In 1938, he presided over the seventh International Entomological Congress held in Berlin.

In 1943, following the fall of Mussolini, Germany was treated as an enemy. Himmler is thought to have sought Martini's assistance in unleashing a malaria epidemic in the Pontine Marshes. The reclamation of the area and the reduction of malaria had been considered an accomplishment under Italian fascism. The German army stopped pumps that moved water from the hills into the sea, causing the area to revert to brackish marshland where Anopheles labranchiae could breed again. This led to a massive increase in malaria. Whether this malaria outbreak was intentional, as claimed by Yale researcher Frank M. Snowden, has been questioned.

After World War II, Martini sought relief under denazification and wrote to a former Jewish assistant, Otto Hecht, hoping for a favourable review.

Martini married a colleague, Erna Hansen, and they had two children. On 2 December 1960, Martini was hit by a tram in a street accident and died three days later. He was buried in Ohlsdorf Cemetery, Hamburg. A mosquito species Anopheles martinius from Uzbekistan was named after Martini by Shingarev in 1926.
