= Hans Leisegang =

Hans Leisegang (March 13, 1890 – April 5, 1951) was a German philosopher and a professor at the University of Leipzig (1920), Jena (1930–34), and Berlin (1948). He was imprisoned for his views on Adolf Hitler during the Nazi era. Leisegang identified philosophy as an interdisciplinary concept of the world and as being synthetic and not analytic. He studied physics and was able to write on the interface of theoretical physics and philosophy.

== Life and work ==
Leisegang was born in Blankenburg as the son of Otto, a military pastor. He studied philosophy, languages, and history at Strasbourg, Paris, and Leipzig. In 1911, he received a doctorate at Strasbourg under Clemens Bäumker and Theobald Ziegler with a dissertation titled “The Concepts of Time and Eternity in later Platonism” (1913), which received a university award. He taught at schools near Markranstädt for some time. He completed his habilitation from the University of Leipzig in 1920 and became a professor in 1925. In 1930, he became a professor of philosophy at the University of Jena. He had written about Gotthold Ephraim Lessing and his worldview in 1931, and Lessing was hated by the National Socialists as a friend of Jews. Leisegang made some derogatory remarks about Hitler, who gave a speech at a memorial event for President Hindenburg in 1934. He was then given a six-month prison sentence. Theodor Litt and a few friends stood by him. He was released after a trial but dismissed from service. He studied physics along with his son and completed his doctorate in 1942 from the University of Jena with a thesis on diode galvanometers for measuring high-frequency AC. Leisegang then worked in the industry as a physicist. After World War II, he was able to resume teaching in Jena on December 1, 1945, but he was dismissed by the university administrators on October 29, 1948. This was because of his opposition to the Soviet governance, non-democratic structures in the university, and refusal to teach Marxism and Leninism. He had to flee from East Germany to West Berlin to avoid arrest. From 1948, he lectured at the Free University in Berlin.

Leisegang wrote extensively about thinking and world view. Leisegang wrote several books including on the history of philosophy in Germany. Among his major works are Die Gnosis (1924) and Denkformen (1928), both of which went through several editions. In Denkformen, Leisegang proposed a typology of philosophical thinking, classifying it into four distinct forms: the thought-circle (Denkform des Gedankenkreises), the circle of circles (Denkform der Kreis von Kreisen), the conceptual pyramid (die Begriffspyramide), and the Euclidean-mathematical thought-form (die euklidisch-mathematische Denkform)

Leisegang married Erna Mehlhose in 1914, and they had a son Siegfried (born 1916) and a daughter Gertrud (1922).
