= Busso Peus =

German jurist and politician

Busso Peus

Queen Elizabeth The Queen Mother and Busso Peus in York in 1960

Busso Peus (19 January 1908 – 5 November 1979) was a German jurist and politician of the Christian Democratic Union. From 1952 to 1964 he was the Mayor of the City of Münster, Germany.

== Early life ==
Peus, son of Friedrich-Carl Peus and first cousin of German numismatist Busso Peus (24 October 1902 - 18 November 1983), studied law at the universities of Heidelberg, Vienna and Münster and received a doctoral degree (Dr. jur.) from the University of Heidelberg. In 1933, he joined his father's law office in Münster as a solicitor and barrister and as a notary.

== Political life ==
Without any considerable political experience he was elected Mayor of Münster in 1952 and stayed in office for six consecutive terms until 1964. He is regarded as a key figure in the reconstruction efforts of the largely destroyed city.

Ahead of the federal elections of 1961, he was falsely alleged to be involved in an assumed cover-up of the circumstances of the death of a partner of his - a campaign that managed to gain media attention throughout the country until the campaign's author was convicted of defamation and was sentenced to two years of imprisonment.

Besides the reconstruction efforts at home, Peus was engaged in early reconciliation efforts abroad and reached twin town agreements with the cities of York, England, in 1957 and Orléans, France, in 1960.

Furthermore, he was a member of the board of the Landesbank and served as president of the Westphalian Horsemen Club.

In recognition of his commitment to European integration, he was appointed honorary citizen of the City of Orléans in 1964. In 1955, he had been awarded honorary citizenship by the City of New Orleans, Louisiana, in recognition of his dedication to international understanding.

In 2003, a newly built Busso-Peus-Street was opened in Münster in his honour.

== Literature ==
- Franz-Josef Jakobi: Geschichte der Stadt Münster, Volume 3, Aschendorff 1994, ISBN 978-3-402-05370-6
- Dietmar Klenke: "1.4. Der Blomert-Weigand-Prozess als Imagekatastrophe für Münster". In: Schwarz - Münster - Paderborn: Ein antikatholisches Klischeebild. Waxmann Publishers 2008, pages 64–67. ISBN 978-3-8309-1987-2
- Jürgen Kehrer: Schande von Münster: Die Affäre Weigand. Waxmann 1996. ISBN 978-3-89325-469-9
