= Hugh Barr Nisbet =

British political scientist and philosopher (1940–2021)

- Born: 24 August 1940
- Died: 6 February 2021 (aged 80)

Philosophical work
- Era: Contemporary philosophy
- Region: Western philosophy
- School: Continental philosophy

Hugh Barr Nisbet (24 August 1940 – 6 February 2021) was a British literary scholar and Emeritus Professor of Modern Languages (German) at the University of Cambridge. He was known for his works on German literature and philosophy and had worked as General Editor and Germanic Editor of the journal Modern Language Review. Nisbet is a recipient of the Humboldt Prize for research on Lessing (1998).
