= Peter C. Hodgson =

Professor of Theology

Peter Crafts Hodgson (born February 26, 1934) is an American theologian and the Charles G. Finney Professor of Theology, emeritus, at the Divinity School of Vanderbilt University, where he taught from 1965 to 2003. He is considered to be one of the world's foremost translators of the work of Georg Wilhelm Friedrich Hegel, a 19th-century German philosopher.

== Career ==
Hodgson received his A.B. degree in history from Princeton University (1956); and his B.D., M.A., and PhD degrees from Yale University (1959, 1960, 1963). Hodgson taught modern and systematic theology at Vanderbilt for 38 years, with a focus on issues such as christology, the doctrine of God (Trinity), liberation theology, theology of history, and Protestant theology in the nineteenth century. His major contributions to systematic theology are New Birth of Freedom: A Theology of Bondage and Liberation (1976), God in History: Shapes of Freedom (1989), and Winds of the Spirit: A Constructive Christian Theology (1994). His nineteenth century studies include G. W. F. Hegel, F. C. Baur, D. F. Strauss, and George Eliot (Mary Ann Evans). He has published new editions and translations of works by Hegel and Baur. He served as chair of the graduate department of religion at Vanderbilt on three separate occasions between 1975 and 2001.

Following his retirement from teaching, Vanderbilt University named him Charles G. Finney Professor of Theology, emeritus. Hodgson and his wife, Eva Fornady Hodgson, endowed a scholarship at Vanderbilt for students wishing to pursue studies in theology or ethics.

== Personal life ==
Hodgson married Eva Sara Fornady in 1960. Eva died in 2024. Peter continues to live in Nashville, Tennessee, following retirement, and spends summers in Eagles Mere, Pennsylvania. Hodgson is ordained in the Presbyterian Church (USA).

== Research and views ==
Following hints from George Eliot, Hodgson believes that theology is a kind of fiction that offers imaginative variations on what is real. But first it must attend to the real, with all the detailed descriptions of the novelist, all the nuances in human attitudes, feelings, and actions, all the ambiguities and tragic failures that characterize human communities. Many theologians and preachers today avoid the real: they offer escapes and fantasies rather than honest engagement with the material world and human culture. The tendency toward supernaturalism and the miraculous is the clearest evidence of this escape, and the interest in the miraculous has not diminished over the ages on the part of many religious people. The problem is that many more people do not find such a worldview persuasive any longer, and they have withdrawn from engagement with religion. They are living in a secular, scientific world, and their values are determined accordingly. These are the values of quantitative measurement, pleasure, and altruism. This is the reality most people live in today, but theology and the church are disconnected from it and offer an alternative world that in many ways is less real. Life in fact is hard, a long and often discouraging struggle with relentless forces—the forces of nature; of the human body with its vulnerability to illness, disease, and aging; of the human psyche with its emotions, aggressions, and depressions.

The belief that God intervenes in history to save people in miraculous ways is not persuasive, according to Hodgson. If God can do this in some instances (those that serve our interests), why should God not always intervene to prevent the vast suffering that is everywhere present, to cancel the great tragedies of history, to protect the environment from the damage that civilization is inflicting on it? God is not a magician who controls what goes on in the world, although many people seem to think of God that way. Christ is not a divine savior who dies a substitutionary death and frees us from responsibility for our deeds. Naïve ideas about God and Christ account for the irrelevance of religion in the world. Theology does not seem much interested in the hard task of reconstructing conceptions of God and Christ in ways that take into account the realities of life as we actually experience them. These realities offer resources for theology if it is open to receiving them: the emancipatory struggles of oppressed peoples, the heightened consciousness of feminism and gender differences, the pluralism of religious and cultural traditions, the participation of humans in a vast ecological system that can be thrown out of balance all too easily.

Theology offers imaginative variations on these realities. This is where ideality comes into play. Following Hegel, Hodgson argues that God is the supreme ideality: pure spirit and absolute rationality. God is the source of creative possibility, imagination, novelty, and purpose. God is not a being among beings, a material entity or natural force. God lacks physicality and cannot be measured, weighed, or used like a material object. God is an idea—certainly a human idea, but also an objectively self-actualizing and self-sustaining idea. Without ideality, the universe would be an immense, soulless interaction of meaningless natural forces. God's ideality includes values that we associate with goodness, love, freedom, trustworthiness, community, superabundance. This ideality goes forth from itself and creates an other than itself, the material and spiritual world, which has its own powers and autonomies that often go awry and conflict with each other, producing tragic and destructive consequences. What we call "spirit" is the ideal embodied in the material and human world. God is absolute spirit, which means that God overreaches and embraces the world of finite spirits within godself, related to all that is not-God.

People do not know the ideal in and for itself except in a purely abstract, rational sense. The advance from Kant to Hegel in the history of philosophy is the advance from abstract rationality to concrete historicality. Hegel says that history is constructed from the interweaving of the divine idea and human passions, and that history is the progress of the consciousness of freedom. The idea provides values and direction; the passions provide energy and movement. History has meaning, but also struggle and conflict. Just how God as the absolute idea provides values and direction to history is one of the most difficult theological questions—the question of how God acts efficaciously in history without violating historical processes. Hegel and Whitehead point to the same answer, namely, that the divine values and guidance function as a lure, a pattern, an invitation calling for a human response. Without the response, without the determination to shape history in accord with the divine pattern, there is no efficacious presence of God in history.

Very often human beings confuse their own purposes with the ideal purpose. They need a concrete paradigm, and Christians believe that Jesus Christ is this paradigm. Hodgson's view is that Jesus is a human being who is filled by the Spirit of God and becomes an agent of God's work in the world through his teaching and example, and his death on a cross. He is not the only such agent. Other religions and cultures have their own paradigmatic agents, such as Moses, Muhammad, Brahman, the Buddha, and among these agents there seems to be a broad concurrence about good and evil, which is not to deny their very real differences. History has produced other great figures who provide moral and intellectual guidance, from Socrates and Plato to Dietrich Bonhoeffer and Martin Luther King Jr. They all represent incarnations of the divine idea, and they all contribute to the progress of the consciousness of freedom. This progression is never complete because history is a mixture of comedy and tragedy, of freedom and oppression, of good and evil. The death of God on the cross of Christ signifies that tragedy is taken up into the divine life and negated there; it continues as a negated element, and this negation gives Christians the courage to face the tragic conflicts of history. Christ, therefore, is for Christians the normative paradigm of God in history.

== Publications ==
=== Authored books ===
- Shapes of Freedom: Hegel’s Philosophy of World History in Theological Perspective (Oxford University Press, 2012)
- Hegel and Christian Theology: A Reading of the Lectures on the Philosophy of Religion (Oxford University Press, 2005)
- Theology in the Fiction of George Eliot: The Mystery Beneath the Real (SCM Press and Fortress Press, 2001)
- Winds of the Spirit: A Constructive Christian Theology (Westminster John Knox Press, 1994)
- God in History: Shapes of Freedom (Abingdon Press, 1989)
- Revisioning the Church: Ecclesial Freedom in the New Paradigm (Fortress Press, 1988)
- New Birth of Freedom: A Theology of Bondage and Liberation (Fortress Press, 1976)
- Jesus––Word and Presence: An Essay in Christology (Fortress Press, 1971)
- The Formation of Historical Theology: A Study of Ferdinand Christian Baur (Harper & Row, 1966)

=== Edited or translated books ===
- Lectures on New Testament Theology, by Ferdinand Christian Baur (edited by Hodgson, translated by Robert F. Brown, Oxford University Press, 2016)
- History of Christian Dogma, by Ferdinand Christian Baur (edited and translated with Robert F. Brown, Oxford University Press, 2014)
- Lectures on the Philosophy of World History, by Georg Wilhelm Friedrich Hegel (edited and translated with Robert F. Brown, Oxford University Press, 2011)
- Lectures on the Proofs of the Existence of God, by Georg Wilhelm Friedrich Hegel (edited and translated, Oxford University Press, 2007)
- Lectures on the Philosophy of Religion, by George Wilhelm Friedrich Hegel, 3 vols. (edited and translated with Robert F. Brown and J. Michael Stewart, University of California Press, 1984–87; reissued by Oxford University Press, 2007)
- Readings in Christian Theology (edited with Robert H. King, Fortress Press, 1985)
- Christian Theology: An Introduction to Its Traditions and Tasks, by the Workgroup on Constructive Theology (edited with Robert H. King, Fortress Press, 1985)
- The Life of Jesus Critically Examined, by David Friedrich Strauss (translated by George Eliot, new edition with annotations by Hodgson, Philadelphia and London, 1972)
- On the Writing of Church History, by Ferdinand Christian Baur (edited and translated, Oxford University Press, 1968)
