= Hegel-Archiv =

Collection of Hegel's works in North Rhine-Westphalia, Germany

The Hegel Archive (German: Hegel-Archiv) was founded in 1958 by Otto Pöggeler in Bonn, in the German state of North Rhine-Westphalia to encourage historical-critical efforts to study the collected works of philosopher Georg Wilhelm Friedrich Hegel. In 1968 the Hegel-Archiv transferred from Bonn to Bochum, Germany.

The North-Rhine/Westphalian Academy of Sciences and the Felix Meiner Publishing House, Hamburg, are publishers of the collected works of Hegel. Since 1968 the Hegel Archives has served as a facility for the faculty of Philosophy, Education and Journalism of the Ruhr University Bochum.

== Research ==
Apart from publishing activity, the Hegel Archives also promotes Hegel research. For example, it coordinates the following efforts:

1. the yearbook of Hegel studies (Hegel-Studien) that since 1961 has provided a forum for research papers and a new bibliography;
2. its own writings and conferences;
3. a special library building that covers the work of Hegel's students;
4. an entire research literature beside Hegel's own works; and
5. Hegel's own monographs.

This library is open to Hegel researchers and international guests as well.

== Director ==
The Hegel Archives was founded in 1958 by Otto Pöggeler, who is a German representative of phenomenology and hermeneutics.

The current head of Hegel Archive is Birgit Sandkaulen. Before her the director of Hegel Archives was Walter Jaeschke, who was also the Editor of the publication of the Collected Works of Hegel.

Jaeschke also assisted Peter C. Hodgson and a team of scholars at the University of California at Berkeley, who, in 1990, published a new translation of Hegel's Lectures on the Philosophy of Religion (1818-1831). This publication radically changed the direction of 20th-century Hegel studies, according to some researchers in the Hegel Society of America.

In the review section of Hegel Studien there were published works by Otto Pöggeler, Ernst Bloch, Hans-Georg Gadamer, Martin Heidegger, Karl Löwith, Heinz Heimsoeth, Dieter Henrich, Annemarie Gethmann-Siefert, Walter Jaeschke, Robert Brandom, John Sallis, Robert Pippin.

== See also ==
- Hegel-Studien
- Hegel Bulletin
- Hegel-Jahrbuch
