= Birgit Sandkaulen =

German philosopher and professor

- Born: 1959 (age 66–67); Koblenz, West Germany

Education
- Education: University of Tübingen; Heidelberg University

Philosophical work
- School: Continental philosophy
- Institutions: Ruhr University Bochum; University of Jena
- Main interests: German idealism, Metaphysics, Ethics
- Notable ideas: Critique of reason; Jacobi and Schelling scholarship

Birgit Sandkaulen (also Sandkaulen-Bock, born 1959 in Koblenz) is a German philosopher and professor at Ruhr University Bochum.

== Life ==
Birgit Sandkaulen studied philosophy and German studies and literature at the University of Tübingen and the University of Poitiers from 1979. She received her doctorate from the University of Tübingen in 1989 with a thesis on Schelling. After her habilitation at Heidelberg University with a study on Friedrich Heinrich Jacobi's critique of reason, she became Professor of Philosophy at the University of Jena in 2000. Her teaching and research activities have focused on classical German philosophy (German idealism). In 2011, she was appointed to the Chair of Philosophy with a special focus on classical German philosophy at the Ruhr University Bochum. From 2011 to 2014, she was a member of the university senate. She has been a full member of the North Rhine-Westphalian Academy of Sciences, Humanities and the Arts since 2013. In 2016, she became a corresponding member of the Austrian Academy of Sciences.

== Writings (selection) ==
=== In English ===
- The Philosophy of Friedrich Heinrich Jacobi. On the Contradiction Between System and Freedom. Bloomsbury. 2023. p. 280. ISBN 978-1-350-23571-7.

=== In German ===
- Ausgang vom Unbedingten: Über den Anfang in der Philosophie Schellings. Vandenhoeck & Ruprecht. 1990. p. 188. ISBN 3-525-30502-8.
- Grund und Ursache. Wilhelm Fink. 2000. p. 271. ISBN 3-7705-3500-6.
- Friedrich Heinrich Jacobi. Studien zum achtzehnten Jahrhundert. Felix Meiner. 2004. pp. XII, 459. ISBN 3-7873-1679-5.
- System und Systemkritik. Kritisches Jahrbuch der Philosophie. Königshausen & Neumann. 2006. ISBN 3-8260-3381-7.
- Jacobis Philosophie. Über den Widerspruch von System und Freiheit. Felix Meiner. 2019. p. 350. ISBN 978-3-7873-3628-9.
- Jacobi und Kant. Felix Meiner. 2021. p. 247. ISBN 978-3-7873-3977-8.
