= Martin Heidegger and Nazism =

Political controversy in philosophy studies

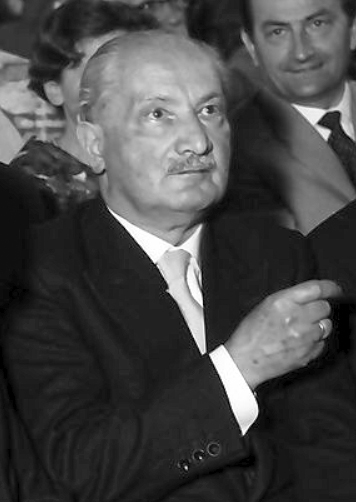
Martin Heidegger c. 1960

Philosopher Martin Heidegger (26 September 1889 – 26 May 1976) joined the Nazi Party (NSDAP) on May 1, 1933, ten days after being elected Rector of the University of Freiburg. A year later, in April 1934, he resigned the Rectorship and stopped taking part in Nazi Party meetings, but remained a member of the Nazi Party until its dismantling at the end of World War II. The denazification hearings immediately after World War II led to Heidegger's dismissal from Freiburg, banning him from teaching. In 1949, after several years of investigation, the French military finally classified Heidegger as a Mitläufer or "fellow traveller." The teaching ban was lifted in 1951, and Heidegger was granted emeritus status in 1953, but he was never allowed to resume his philosophy chairmanship.

Heidegger's involvement with Nazism, his attitude towards Jews and his near-total silence about the Holocaust in his writing and teaching after 1945 are highly controversial. The Black Notebooks, written between 1931 and 1941, contain several anti-semitic statements, although they also contain statements where Heidegger appears extremely critical of racial antisemitism. After 1945, Heidegger never published anything about the Holocaust or the extermination camps, and made one sole verbal mention of them, in 1949, whose meaning is disputed among scholars. Heidegger never apologized for anything and is known to have expressed regret once, privately, when he described his rectorship and the related political engagement as "the greatest stupidity of his life" ("die größte Dummheit seines Lebens").

Whether there is a relation between Heidegger's political affiliation and his philosophy is another matter of controversy. Critics, such as Günther Anders, Jürgen Habermas, Theodor Adorno, Hans Jonas, Maurice Merleau-Ponty, Karl Löwith, Pierre Bourdieu, Maurice Blanchot, Emmanuel Levinas, Luc Ferry, Jacques Ellul, György Lukács, and Alain Renaut assert that Heidegger's affiliation with the Nazi Party revealed flaws inherent in his philosophical conceptions. His supporters, such as Hannah Arendt, Otto Pöggeler, Jan Patočka, Silvio Vietta, Jacques Derrida, Jean Beaufret, Jean-Michel Palmier, Richard Rorty, Marcel Conche, Julian Young, Catherine Malabou, and François Fédier, see his involvement with Nazism as an "error" – a word which Arendt placed in quotation marks when referring to Heidegger's Nazi-era politics – that is less crucial to his philosophy than the critics believe.

== Timeline ==
=== Heidegger's rectorate at the University of Freiburg ===
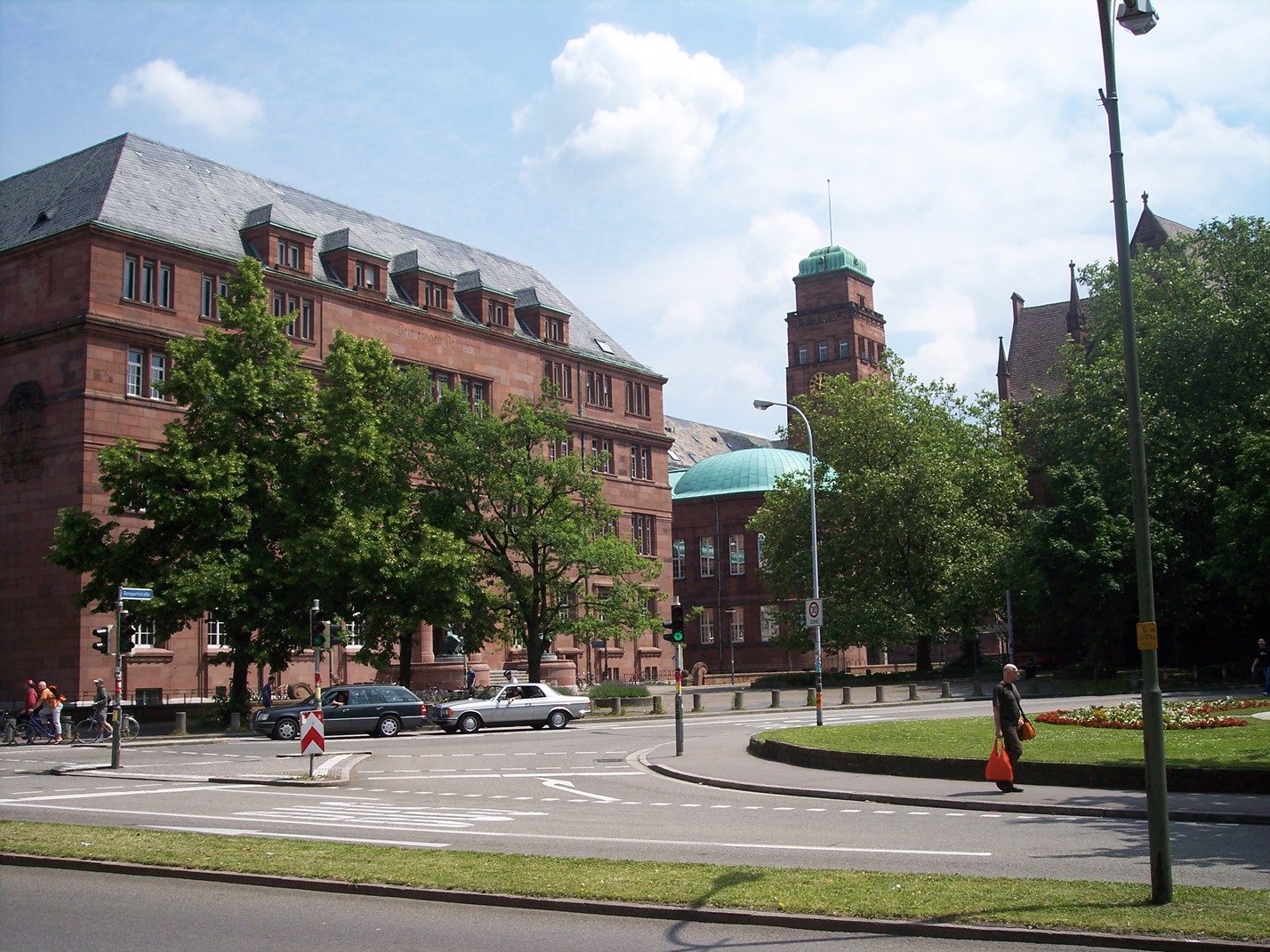
The University of Freiburg, where Heidegger was Rector from April 21, 1933, to April 23, 1934

Adolf Hitler was sworn in as Chancellor of Germany on January 30, 1933. Heidegger was elected rector of the University of Freiburg on April 21, 1933, on the recommendation of his predecessor von Möllendorff, who was forced to give up his position because he had refused to display an anti-Jewish poster, and assumed the position the following day. He joined the "National Socialist German Workers' Party" ten days later, on May 1 (significantly the international day of workers' solidarity: Heidegger said after the war he supported the social more than the national). He co-signed a public telegram sent by Nazi rectors to Hitler on May 20, 1933. Otto Pöggeler puts this attitude into perspective:

He wasn't alone to be mystified. Toynbee too after an audience in 1936 noted about Hitler: "he has beautiful hands". [...] Mein Kampf had hardly been read and absolutely not taken seriously. [...] Roosevelt was impressed by Hitler's manners, the Times in London supported Hitler's demands, and as a result of high stock exchange prices, people applauded in London's cinemas when the newsreel showed Hitler's image.

In Germany, the atmosphere of those days has been described by Sebastian Haffner, who experienced it himself, as "a widespread feeling of deliverance, of liberation from democracy." Rüdiger Safranski explains:

This sense of relief at the demise of democracy was shared not only by the enemies of the republic. Most of its supporters, too, no longer credited it with the strength to master the crisis. It was as if a paralyzing weight had been lifted. Something genuinely new seemed to be beginning—a people's rule without political parties, with a leader of whom it was hoped that he would unite Germany once more internally and make her self-assured externally. [...] Hitler's "Peace Speech" of May 17, 1933, when he declared that "boundless love and loyalty to one's own nation" included "respect" for the national rights of other nations, had its effect. The London Times observed that Hitler had "indeed spoken for a united Germany." Even among the Jewish population—despite the boycott of Jewish businesses on April 1 and the dismissal of Jewish public employees after April 7—there was a good deal of enthusiastic support for the "National revolution". Georg Picht recalls that Eugen Rosenstock-Huessy, in a lecture in March 1933, declared that the National Socialist revolution was an attempt by the Germans to realize Hölderlin's dream. [...] in actual fact Heidegger, during that first year, was bewitched by Hitler.

Jaspers noted about his last meeting with him in May 1933: "It's just like 1914, again this deceptive mass intoxication."

During his time as rector, Heidegger, like his predecessor, refused to display the anti-Jewish poster. He argued after the war that he joined the Party to avoid dismissal, and he forbade the planned book-burning that was scheduled to take place in front of the main University building. Nevertheless, according to Victor Farias, Hugo Ott, and Emmanuel Faye, Heidegger implemented the Gleichschaltung totalitarian policy, suppressing all opposition to the government. Faye [pp. 40–46] details precisely Heidegger's actions in implementing antisemitic legislation within Freiburg University. Along with Ernst Krieck and Alfred Baeumler, Heidegger spearheaded the Conservative Revolution promoted (in the beginning) by the Nazis. But according to others such as François Fédier and Julian Young, Heidegger "called for, not the subordination of the university to the state, but precisely the reverse", and "did indeed seek to protect students from indoctrination by the crasser form of Nazi propaganda". Young quotes the testimony of a former student, Georg Picht:

The way Heidegger conceived of the revival of the university, this became clear to me on the occasion of a memorable event. To give the first lecture within the framework of "political education" – a compulsory measure introduced at the universities by the Nazis [...] – Heidegger, rector at that time, invited my mother's brother in law, Viktor von Weizsäcker. Everyone was puzzled, because it was well-known that Weizsäcker was no Nazi. But Heidegger's word was law. The student he had chosen to lead the philosophy department thought he should pronounce introductory words on national socialist revolution. Heidegger soon manifested signs of impatience, then he shouted with a loud voice that irritation strained: "this jabber will stop immediately!" Totally prostrated, the student disappeared from the tribune. He had to resign from office. As for Victor von Weizsäcker, he gave a perfect lecture on his philosophy of medicine, in which national socialism was not once mentioned, but far rather Sigmund Freud.

Picht recalls his uncle Weizsäcker told him afterwards about Heidegger's political engagement:

I'm pretty sure it's a misunderstanding – such a thing happens often in history of philosophy. But Heidegger is a step ahead: he perceives something is going on that the others don't.

Heidegger's tenure as rector was fraught with difficulties. He was in conflict with Nazi students, intellectuals, and bureaucrats. Philosophical historian Hans Sluga wrote:

Though as rector he prevented students from displaying an anti-Semitic poster at the entrance to the university and from holding a book burning, he kept in close contact with the Nazi student leaders and clearly signaled to them his sympathy with their activism.

Some Nazi education officials viewed also him as a rival, while others saw his efforts as comical. His most risible initiative was the creation of a Wissenschaftslager or Scholar's camp, seriously described by Rockmore as a "reeducation camp", but by Safranski as rather a "mixture of scout camp and Platonic academy", actually "to build campfires, share food, have conversation, sing along with guitar... with people who were really a little beyond Cub Scout age". Safranski tells how a dispute occurred with a group of SA students and their military spirit. Some of Heidegger's fellow Nazis also ridiculed his philosophical writings as gibberish. He finally offered his resignation on April 23, 1934, and it was accepted on April 27. Heidegger remained a member of both the academic faculty and of the Nazi Party until the end of the war, but took no part in Party meetings. In 1944, he didn't even have the right to teach anymore, was considered a "completely dispensable" teacher, and was ordered up the Rhine to build fortifications, then drafted into the Volkssturm national militia, "the oldest member of the faculty to be called up". In 1945 Heidegger wrote of his term as rector, giving the writing to his son Hermann; it was published in 1983:

The rectorate was an attempt to see something in the movement that had come to power, beyond all its failings and crudeness, that was much more far-reaching and that could perhaps one day bring a concentration on the Germans' Western historical essence. It will in no way be denied that at the time I believed in such possibilities and for that reason renounced the actual vocation of thinking in favor of being effective in an official capacity. In no way will what was caused by my own inadequacy in office be played down. But these points of view do not capture what is essential and what moved me to accept the rectorate.

==== Inaugural address ====
Heidegger's inaugural address as rector of Freiburg, the "Rektoratsrede", was entitled "The Self-Assertion of the German University" ("Die Selbstbehauptung der deutschen Universität"). This speech has become notorious as a visible endorsement of Nazism by Heidegger, giving the blessing of his philosophy to the new political party. However, philosopher Jacques Taminiaux writes that "it is to admit that the rectorate speech do[es] not tally at all with the Nazi ideology", and Eduard Langwald calls it even a "challenge to Hitlerism" or an "anti-Mein-Kampf-address", for Heidegger refers to Plato instead of Hitler (who is not mentioned) and, above all, puts limits on the Nazi leader-principle (Führerprinzip):

All leading must concede its following its own strength. All following, however, bears resistance in itself. This essential opposition of leading and following must not be blurred let alone eliminated.

In this speech, Heidegger declared that "science must become the power that shapes the body of the German university." But by "science" he meant "the primordial and full essence of science", which he defined as "engaged knowledge about the people and about the destiny of the state that keeps itself in readiness [...] at one with the spiritual mission."

He went on to link this concept of "science" with a historical struggle of the German people:

The will to the essence of the German university is the will to science as will to the historical spiritual mission of the German people as a people ["Volk"] that knows itself in its state ["Staat"]. Together, science and German destiny must come to power in the will to essence. And they will do so and only will do so, if we – teachers and students – on the one hand, expose science to its innermost necessity and, on the other hand, are able to stand our ground while German destiny is in its most extreme distress.

Heidegger also linked the concept of a people with "blood and soil" in a way that would now be regarded as characteristic of Nazism:

The spiritual world of a people is not the superstructure of a culture any more than it is an armory filled with useful information and values; it is the power that most deeply preserves the people’s earth- and blood-bound strengths as the power that most deeply arouses and most profoundly shakes the people’s existence.

François Fédier and Beda Allemann argue that this topic was not at that time specifically Nazi. For instance, Austrian-born Israeli philosopher Martin Buber said in 1911: "Blood is the deepest power stratum of the soul" (Three addresses on Judaism). In 1936, anti-fascist poet Antonin Artaud wrote that "Any true culture is based on race and blood."

The 1933–34 lecture course "On the Essence of Truth":

There is much talk nowadays of blood and soil as frequently invoked powers. Literati, whom one comes across even today, have already seized hold of them. Blood and soil are certainly powerful and necessary, but they are not a sufficient condition for the Dasein of a people.

Heidegger's concept of a people is "historical" and not only biological as in Alfred Rosenberg, the Nazi Party's chief racial theorist. In his 1941–42 lecture course on Hölderlin's poem "Andenken", Heidegger contends that a people finding itself only in skull measurements and archaeological digs is unable to find itself as a people.

The rectorate speech ended with calls for the German people to "will itself" and "fulfill its historical mission":

But no one will even ask us whether we do or do not will, when the spiritual strength of the West fails and its joints crack, when this moribund semblance of a culture caves in and drags all forces into confusion and lets them suffocate in madness.

Whether this will or will not happen depends solely on whether we, as a historical-spiritual people, still and once again will ourselves – or whether we no longer will ourselves. Each individual participates in this decision even when, and especially when, he evades it.

But we do will that our people fulfill its historical mission.

==== Speech to Heidelberg Student Association ====
In June 1933, Heidegger gave a speech to the Student Association at the University of Heidelberg in which he gave clear form to his platonic views on the need for the university "to educate the State’s leaders", in the spirit of the Plato's quote ending the Rectorate speech with "All that is great stands in the storm" (Republic 497d9), but also "in the National Socialist spirit" and free from "humanizing, Christian ideas":

'We have the new Reich and the university that is to receive its tasks from the Reich’s will to existence. There is revolution in Germany, and we must ask ourselves: Is there revolution at the university as well? No. The battle still consists of skirmishes. So far, a breakthrough has only been achieved on one front: because new life is being educated ("durch die Bildung neuen Lebens") in the work camp and educational association ("Erziehungsverband") as well as at the university, the latter has been relieved of educational tasks to which it has till now believed it had an exclusive right.

The possibility could exist that the university will suffer death through oblivion and forfeit the last vestige of its educational power. It must, however, be integrated again into the Volksgemeinschaft and be joined together with the State. The university must again become an educational force that draws on knowledge to educate the State’s leaders to knowledge. This goal demands three things: 1. knowledge of today’s university; 2. knowledge of the dangers today holds for the future; 3. new courage.

Up to now, research and teaching have been carried on at the universities as they were for decades. Teaching was supposed to develop out of research, and one sought to find a pleasant balance between the two. It was always only the point of view of the teacher that spoke out of this notion. No one had concerned himself with the university as community. Research got out of hand and concealed its uncertainty behind the idea of international scientific and scholarly progress. Teaching that had become aimless hid behind examination requirements.

A fierce battle must be fought against this situation in the National Socialist spirit, and this spirit cannot be allowed to be suffocated by humanizing, Christian ideas that suppress its unconditionality.

Danger comes not from work for the State. It comes only from indifference and resistance. For that reason, only true strength should have access to the right path, but not halfheartedness...

The new teaching which is at issue here does not mean conveying knowledge, but allowing students to learn and inducing them to learn. This means allowing oneself to be beset by the unknown and then becoming master of it in comprehending knowing; it means becoming secure in one's sense of what is essential. It is from such teaching that true research emerges, interlocked with the whole through its rootedness in the people and its bond to the state. The student is forced out into the uncertainty of all things, in which the necessity of engagement is grounded. University study must again become a risk, not a refuge for the cowardly. Whoever does not survive the battle, lies where he falls. The new courage must accustom itself to steadfastness, for the battle for the institutions where our leaders are educated will continue for a long time. It will be fought out of the strengths of the new Reich that Chancellor Hitler will bring to reality. A hard race with no thought of self must fight this battle, a race that lives from constant testing and that remains directed toward the goal to which it has committed itself. It is a battle to determine who shall be the teachers and leaders at the university.

==== Denounced or demoted non-Nazis ====
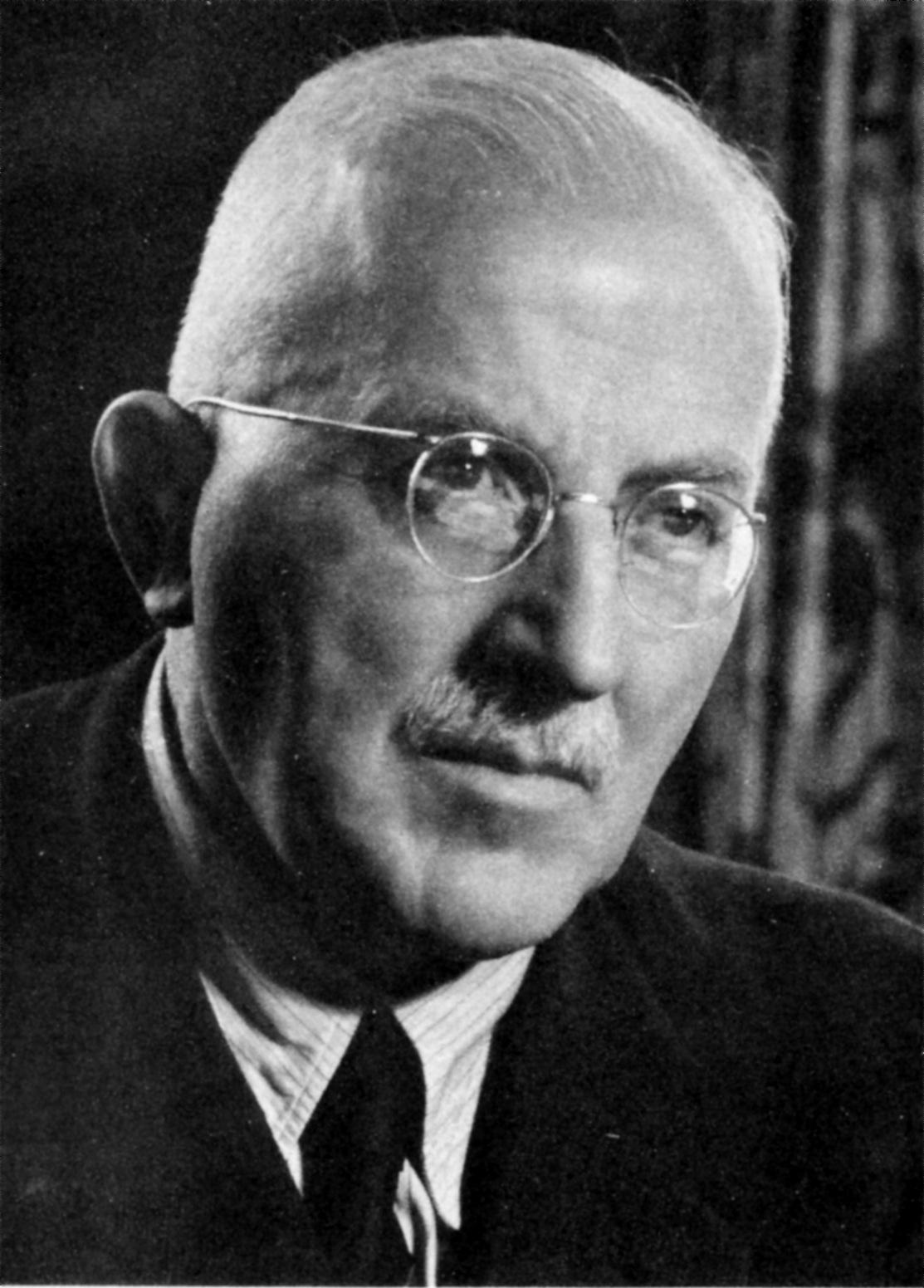
Hermann Staudinger

According to Farias and Ott, Heidegger also denounced or demoted three colleagues for being insufficiently committed to the Nazi cause. But this has been disputed by Eduard Langwald, who considers "Heidegger was never a Nazi-minded informer".

According to Hugo Ott, Heidegger leaked information on September 29, 1933 to the local minister of education that the chemist Hermann Staudinger had been a pacifist during World War I. Staudinger was a professor of chemistry at Freiburg, and had developed the theory that polymers were long chain molecule, a theory confirmed by later work and for which Staudinger received the Nobel Prize in 1953. Heidegger knew that the allegation of pacifism could cost Staudinger his job. The Gestapo investigated the matter and confirmed Heidegger's tip. Asked for his recommendation as rector of the university, Heidegger secretly urged the ministry to fire Staudinger without a pension. But nothing eventually happened. As Langwald alleges Heidegger was himself a pacifist since World War I, he doubts that Heidegger could so suddenly become a "pacifist hunter" acting "furiously macho", and asserts Ott did not interpret the facts properly. After Hitler's "Peace Speech" of May 17, 1933, Heidegger more likely wanted to test Staudinger, because as a chemist his researches could become dangerous. Safranski, although he charges Heidegger, recognizes: "It is likely that Heidegger [...] may not even have viewed his action as a denunciation. He felt he was a part of the revolutionary movement, and it was his intention to keep opportunists away from the revolutionary awakening. They were not to be allowed to sneak into the movement and use it to their advantage."

Heidegger in the same spirit denounced his former friend Eduard Baumgarten in a letter to the head of the organization of Nazi professors at the University of Göttingen, where Baumgarten had been teaching. He intervened as Baumgarten applied for membership in the SA brownshirts and in the National Socialist Dozentenschaft. In the letter, Heidegger called Baumgarten "anything but a National-Socialist" and underlined his links to "the Heidelberg circle of liberal-democratic intellectuals around Max Weber." But he failed and the opportunistic Baumgarten continued in his career – with the help of the Party. Langwald thinks Heidegger considered Baumgarten as a dangerous pragmatist who could give philosophical weapons to the NS-ideologie.

The Catholic intellectual Max Müller was a member of the inner circle of Heidegger's most gifted students from 1928 to 1933. But Müller stopped attending Heidegger's lectures when Heidegger joined the Nazi party in May 1933. Seven months later, Heidegger fired Müller from his position as a student leader because Müller was "not politically appropriate." Then in 1938 Müller discovered that Heidegger had blocked him from getting a teaching position at Freiburg by informing the university administration that Müller was "unfavorably disposed" toward the regime. Langwald thinks that Heidegger had really no choice but to fire him from his position, as Müller showed too publicly that he was indeed more than "not politically appropriate". Heidegger also fired a Nazi student leader because he was this time too favorably disposed toward the regime (see Picht's testimony).

==== Attitude towards Jews ====
On November 3, 1933, Heidegger issued a decree applying the Nazi racial policies to the students of Freiburg university. These laws meant that Jews were now indirectly and directly dissuaded or banned from privileged and superior positions reserved for "Aryan Germans." Heidegger announced that economic aid would henceforth be awarded to students who belonged to the SS, the SA, or other military groups but would be denied to "Jewish or Marxist students" or anyone who fit the description of a "non-Aryan" in Nazi law.

After 1933, Heidegger declined to direct the doctoral dissertations of Jewish students: he sent all those students to his Catholic colleague Professor Martin Honecker. And in his letter denouncing Baumgarten, cited above, Heidegger wrote that "after failing with me" [not as a student but as a friend!], Baumgarten "frequented, very actively, the Jew Fränkel"—i.e. Eduard Fränkel, a noted professor of classics at Freiburg. Jaspers declared he was surprised by this expression, "the Jew Fränkel", because Heidegger had never been antisemitic before. But the reason is perhaps that the only copy of this letter about Baumgarten seems actually not to have been written by Heidegger himself. Moreover, Heidegger did indeed write a "very impressive letter to the Education minister" (Hugo Ott) in July 1933, this one authentic, to defend Eduard Fränkel against the new antisemitic law.

There are nevertheless troubling passages from Heidegger's lecture and seminar courses from the period of the Nazi Gleichschaltung. In a passage reflecting on Heraclitus' fragment 53, "War is the father of all things", in the summer of 1933–34 after the Nazis' first round of antisemitic legislation (including university employment and enrollment reforms), Heidegger argued in the following terms concerning the need for 'polemos' or 'Kampf' (combat, war and/or struggle) with an internal enemy:

The enemy is one who poses an essential threat to the existence of the people and its members. The enemy is not necessarily the outside enemy, and the outside enemy is not necessarily the most dangerous. It may even appear that there is no enemy at all. The root requirement is then to find the enemy, bring him to light or even to create him, so that there may be that standing up to the enemy, and so that existence does not become apathetic. The enemy may have grafted himself onto the innermost root of the existence of a people, and oppose the latter's ownmost essence, acting contrary to it. All the keener and harsher and more difficult is then the struggle, for only a very small part of the struggle consists in mutual blows; it is often much harder and more exhausting to seek out the enemy as such, and to lead him to reveal himself, to avoid nurturing illusions about him, to remain ready to attack, to cultivate and increase constant preparedness and to initiate the attack on a long-term basis, with the goal of total extermination [völligen Vernichtung].

In his advanced contemporary seminars "On the Essence and Concept of Nature, State and History," Heidegger expostulated in essentialising terms concerning "semitic nomads" and their lack of possible relation to the German homeland, "drifting" in the "unessence of history":

History teaches us that nomads did not become what they are because of the bleakness of the desert and the steppes, but that they have even left numerous wastelands behind them that had been fertile and cultivated land when they arrived, and that men rooted in the soil have been able to create for themselves a native land, even in the wilderness ... the nature of our German space would surely be apparent to a Slavic people in a different manner than to us; to a Semitic nomad, it may never be apparent.

==== Attitude towards his mentor Husserl ====
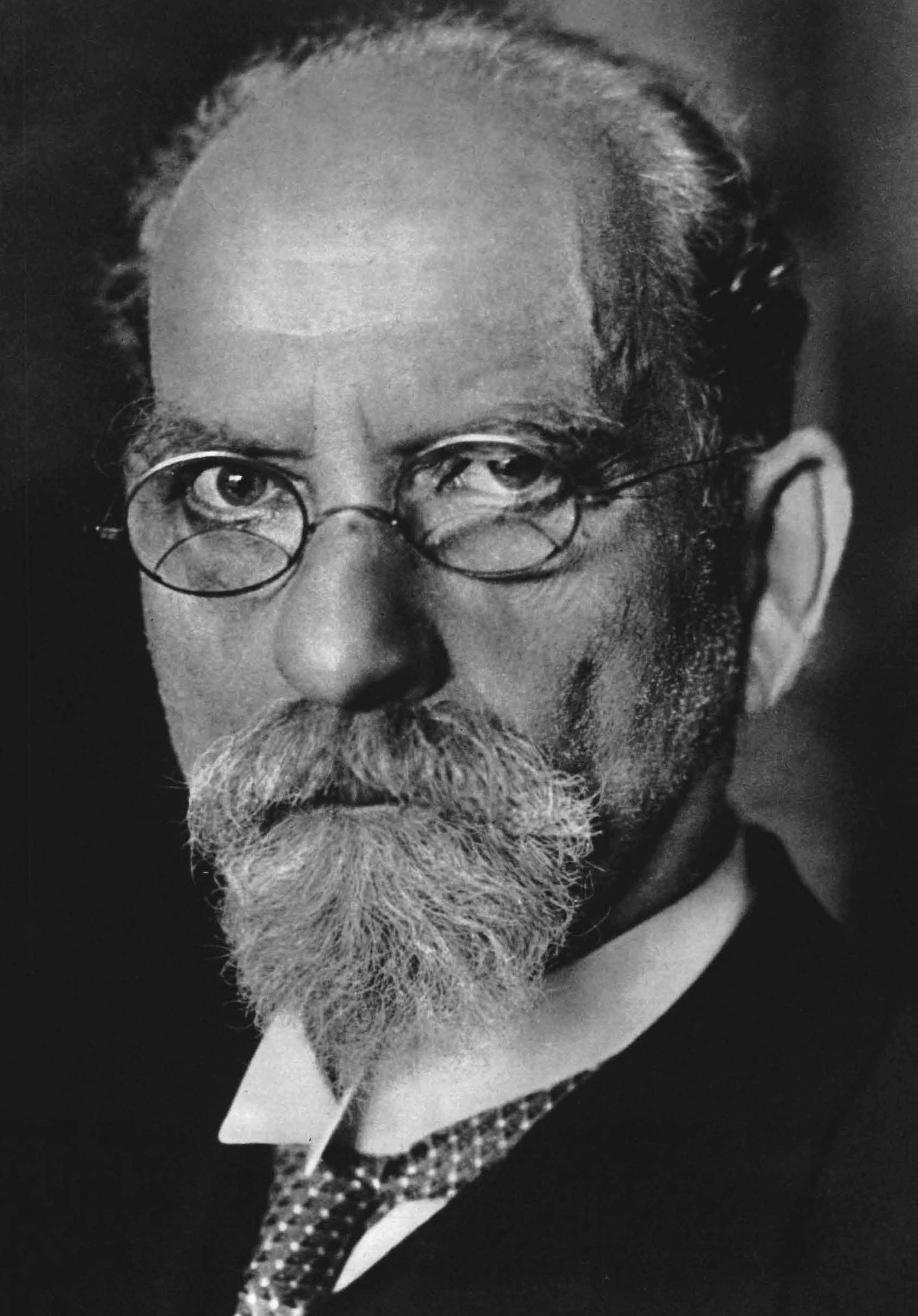
Edmund Husserl, the man who established the school of phenomenology

Beginning in 1917, the philosopher Edmund Husserl championed Heidegger's work, and helped him secure the retiring Husserl's chair in philosophy at the University of Freiburg.

On April 6, 1933, the Reichskommissar of Baden Province, Robert Wagner, suspended all Jewish government employees, including present and retired faculty at the University of Freiburg. Husserl, who was born Jewish and was an adult convert to Lutheran Christianity, was affected by this law. Heidegger did not become Rector until April 22, so it was Heidegger's predecessor as Rector who formally notified Husserl of his "enforced leave of absence" on April 14, 1933. Then, the week after Heidegger's election, the national Reich law of April 28, 1933 came into effect, overriding Wagner's decree, and requiring that all Jewish professors from German universities, including those who had converted to Christianity, be fired. The termination of Husserl's academic privileges thus did not involve any specific action on Heidegger's part.

Heidegger had by then broken off contact with Husserl, other than through intermediaries. Heidegger later stated that his relationship with Husserl had become strained after Husserl publicly "settled accounts" with him and Max Scheler in the early 1930s. However, in 1933 Husserl wrote to a friend, "The perfect conclusion to this supposed bosom friendship of two philosophers was his very public, very theatrical entrance into the Nazi Party on May 1. Prior to that there was his self-initiated break in relations with me – in fact, soon after his appointment at Freiburg – and, over the last few years, his anti-Semitism, which he came to express with increasing vigor – even against the coterie of his most enthusiastic students, as well as around the department."

Heidegger did not attend his former mentor's cremation in 1938. He spoke of Husserl as a "human failure" and begged pardon in a letter to his wife.

There is no truth to the oft-repeated story that during Heidegger's time as Rector, the University denied Husserl access to the university library. But in 1941, under pressure from publisher Max Niemeyer, Heidegger did agree to remove the dedication to Husserl from Being and Time, but it could still be found in a footnote on page 38, thanking Husserl for his guidance and generosity. Husserl, of course, had died several years earlier. The dedication was restored in post-war editions.

==== Support for the "Führer principle" ====
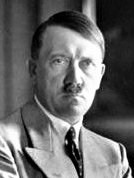
Adolf Hitler was made Chancellor of Germany in January 1933.

According to Emmanuel Faye, Heidegger supported the "necessity of a Führer" for Germany as early as 1918. But Heidegger spoke actually of the "necessity of leaders" or "guides" (genitive plural: die Notwendigkeit der Führer) because "only individuals are creative (even to lead), the crowd never", which sounds more platonic than Nazi; Heidegger in the same letter speaks about people who are rightly "appalled at the Pan-Germanic chimerae" after the first World War.

In a number of speeches during November 1933, Heidegger endorses the Führerprinzip ("leader principle"), i.e. the principle that the Führer is the embodiment of the people; that he is always right and that his word is above all written law and demands total obedience. For example, in one speech Heidegger stated:

Let not propositions and 'ideas' be the rules of your being (Sein). The Führer alone is the present and future German reality and its law. Learn to know ever more deeply: that from now on every single thing demands decision, and every action responsibility. Heil Hitler!

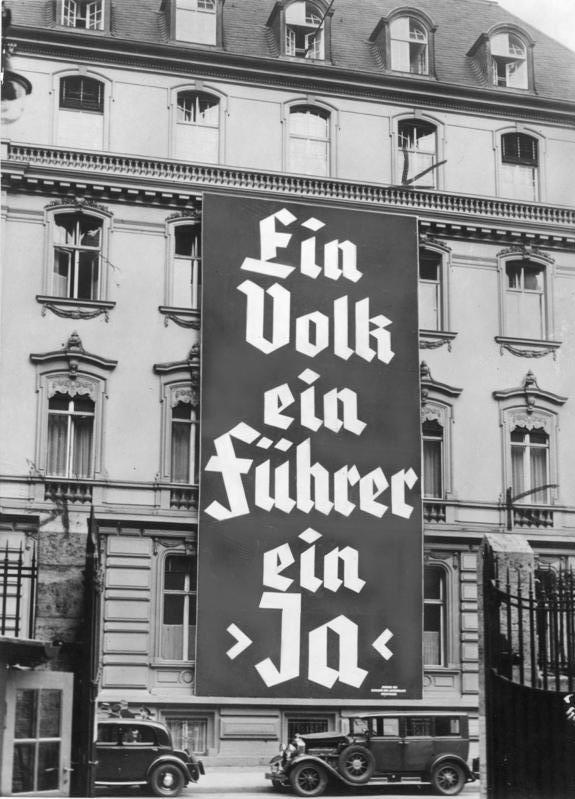
Election banner, November 1933: "One People, one Leader, one 'Yes'"

In another speech a few days later, Heidegger endorsed the German election of November 1933, in which the electorate was presented with a single Nazi-approved list of candidates:

The German people has been summoned by the Führer to vote; the Führer, however, is asking nothing from the people; rather, he is giving the people the possibility of making, directly, the highest free decision of all: whether it – the entire people – wants its own existence (Dasein), or whether it does not want it. [...] On November 12, the German people as a whole will choose its future, and this future is bound to the Führer. [...] There are not separate foreign and domestic policies. There is only one will to the full existence (Dasein) of the State. The Führer has awakened this will in the entire people and has welded it into a single resolve.

Later in November 1933, Heidegger attended a conference at the University of Tübingen organized by the students of the university and the Kampfbund, the local Nazi Party chapter. In this address, he argued for a revolution in knowledge, a revolution that would displace the traditional idea that the university should be independent of the state:

We have witnessed a revolution. The state has transformed itself. This revolution was not the advent of a power pre-existing in the bosom of the state or of a political party. The national-socialist revolution means rather the radical transformation of German existence. [...] However, in the university, not only has the revolution not yet achieved its aims, it has not even started.

Heidegger addressed some of these remarks in the 1966 Der Spiegel interview "Only a God Can Save Us" (see below). In that interview, he stated: "I would no longer write [such things] today. Such things as that I stopped saying by 1934."

In a recent book Hans Jonas, a former student of Heidegger, argues that Heidegger's endorsement of the "Führer principle" stemmed from his philosophy and was consistent with it:

But as to Heidegger's being, it is an occurrence of unveiling, a fate-laden happening upon thought: so was the Führer and the call of German destiny under him: an unveiling of something indeed, a call of being all right, fate-laden in every sense: neither then nor now did Heidegger's thought provide a norm by which to decide how to answer such calls—linguistically or otherwise: no norm except depth, resolution, and the sheer force of being that issues the call.

Jonas' reading can be supported by citations from Heidegger's lectures during and immediately following the time he was rector. In "On the Essence and Concept of Nature, History and State", for instance, Heidegger appears to give a direct ontological sanction to Hitler's absolute rule:

...The origin of all political action is not in knowledge, but in being. Every Führer is a Führer, must be a Führer [italics in original], in accordance with the stamp in his being, and simultaneously, in the living unfolding of his proper essence, he understands, thinks, and puts into action what the people and the state are.

In his 1934 class on Hölderlin, Heidegger is able to comment that "The true and only Führer makes a sign in his being towards the domain [Bereich, realm] of the demigods. Being the Führer is a destiny …”,

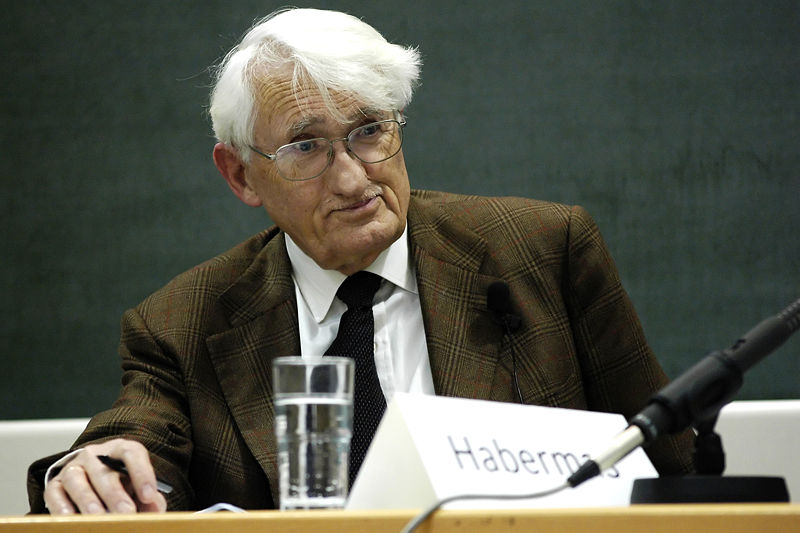
Jürgen Habermas

On a related note, in his 1985 book The Philosophical Discourse of Modernity, Jürgen Habermas wrote that Heidegger's lack of explicit criticism against Nazism is due to his unempowering turn (Kehre) towards Being as time and history: "he detaches his actions and statements altogether from himself as an empirical person and attributes them to a fate for which one cannot be held responsible."

==== Resignation from rectorship ====
In his postwar justification, Heidegger claimed he resigned the rectorship in April 1934 because the ministry in Karlsruhe had demanded the dismissal of the deans Erik Wolf and Wilhelm von Möllendorff on political grounds. But Rüdiger Safransky found no trace of such events and prefers talking about a disagreement with other Party members. According to the historian Richard J. Evans:

By the beginning of 1934, there were reports in Berlin that Heidegger had established himself as 'the philosopher of National Socialism'. But to other Nazi thinkers, Heidegger's philosophy appeared too abstract, too difficult, to be of much use [...] Though his intervention was welcomed by many Nazis, on closer inspection such ideas did not really seem to be in tune with the Party's. It is not surprising that his enemies were able to enlist the support of Alfred Rosenberg, whose own ambition it was to be the philosopher of Nazism himself. Denied a role at the national level, and increasingly frustrated with the minutiae of academic politics – which seemed to him to betray a sad absence of the new spirit he had hoped would permeate the universities – Heidegger resigned his post in April 1934.

=== Post-rectorate period ===
After he resigned from the rectorship, Heidegger withdrew from most political activity but he never withdrew his membership in the Nazi party. In May 1934 he accepted a position on the Committee for the Philosophy of Law in the Academy for German Law (Ausschuss für Rechtsphilosophie der Akademie für Deutsches Recht), where he remained active until at least 1936. The academy had official consultant status in preparing Nazi legislation such as the Nuremberg racial laws that came into effect in 1935. In addition to Heidegger, such Nazi notables as Hans Frank, Julius Streicher, Carl Schmitt and Alfred Rosenberg belonged to the academy and served on this committee. References to Nazism continued to appear in Heidegger's work, always in ambiguous ways, suitably disguised for the benefit of the Gestapo spies, according to François Fédier and Julian Young, in order to hide his own version of Nazism, as per Emmanuel Faye. For instance, in a 1935 lecture, he publicly criticized National Socialism, but referred in passing to the "inner truth and greatness of this movement":

What today is systematically touted as the philosophy of National Socialism, but which has nothing in the least to do with the inner truth and greatness of this movement (namely the encounter of a globally determined technology with the man of the new age), darts about with fish-like movements in the murky waters of these 'values' and 'totalities'.

Heidegger explained later that:

The whole lecture shows that I was at that time an adversary of the regime. The understanding ears knew therefore how to interpret the sentence. Only the spies of the party who – I knew it – sat in my courses, understood the sentence otherwise, as it must be. One had to throw them a crumb here and there in order to keep freedom of teaching and speaking.

This lecture was published in 1953 under the title An Introduction to Metaphysics. In the published version, Heidegger left the sentence, but added a parenthetical qualification: "(namely, the confrontation of planetary technology and modern humanity)". Heidegger did not mention that this qualification was added at the time of publication, and was not part of the original lecture.

This raised concerns in post-Nazi Germany that Heidegger was distinguishing a "good Nazism" from a "bad Nazism", a contention supported by his philosophical opponents, including Baeumler. The controversial page of the 1935 manuscript is missing from the Heidegger Archives in Marbach. He explained again during the Der Spiegel interview that "The reason I did not read that passage aloud was because I was convinced my audience would understand me correctly. The stupid ones and the spies and the snoopers understood it differently – and might as well have, too." In this same course, Heidegger criticized both Russia and the United States: "Seen metaphysically, Russia and America are both the same: the same desolate frenzy of unbounded technology and of the unlimited organization of the average human being." He then calls Germany "the most metaphysical of nations." This is a good example of Heidegger's ambiguous way of speaking, since his students would have known that "metaphysical" in this context is actually a synonym of "technological" and "nihilistic" and therefore a term of harsh criticism. In his 1938 lecture, The Age of the World Picture, he wrote "...the laborious fabrication of such absurd entities as National Socialist philosophies" – but didn't read it aloud.

Heidegger defended himself during the denazification period by claiming that he had opposed the philosophical bases of Nazism, especially biologism and the Nazi interpretation of Nietzsche's The Will to Power.

In a 1936 lecture, Heidegger still sounded rather ambiguous as to whether Nietzsche's thought was compatible with Nazism, or at least with that hypothetical "good Nazism": "The two men who, each in his own way, have introduced a counter movement to nihilism – Mussolini and Hitler – have learned from Nietzsche, each in an essentially different way." A subtle correction followed immediately: "But even with that, Nietzsche's authentic metaphysical domain has not yet come unto its own."

According to personal notes made in 1939 (not published until 2006), Heidegger took strong exception to Hitler's statement, "There is no attitude, which could not be ultimately justified by the ensuing usefulness for the totality." Under the heading "Truth and Usefulness", Heidegger's private critique is as follows:

Who makes up this totality? (Eighty million-strong extant human mass? Does its extantness assign to this human mass the right to the claim on a continued existence?) How is this totality determined? What is its goal? Is it itself the goal of all goals? Why? Wherein lies the justification for this goal-setting? [...] Why is usefulness the criterion for the legitmacy of a human attitude? On what is this principle grounded? [...] From where does the appeal to usefulness as the measure of truth acquire its comprehensibility? Does comprehensibility justify legitimacy?

In a 1942 lecture, published posthumously, Heidegger was once again ambiguous on the subject of Nazism. During a discussion of then recent German classics scholarship, he said that: "In the majority of 'research results', the Greeks appear as pure National Socialists. This overenthusiasm on the part of academics seems not even to notice that with such "results" it does National Socialism and its historical uniqueness no service at all, not that it needs this anyhow."

In the same lecture, he commented on America's entry into World War II, in a way that seems to identify his philosophy with the Nazi cause:

The entry of America into this planetary war is not an entry into history. No, it is already the last American act of America's history-lessness and self-destruction. This act is the renunciation of the Origin. It is a decision for lack-of-Origin.

==== Student testimonials ====
Among Heidegger's students, Günther Anders saw in Heidegger's lectures a "reactionary potential", and Karl Löwith said that in Rome his master spoke enthusiastically of Hitler. However, most students who attended Heidegger's courses between 1933 and 1945 confirm that he became very soon an adversary of Nazism. Walter Biemel, Heidegger's student in 1942, testified in 1945:

Heidegger was the only professor not to give any Nazi salutations prior to beginning his courses, even though it was administrative obligation. His courses... were among the very rare ones where remarks against National Socialism were risked. Some conversations in those times could cost you your head. I had many such conversations with Heidegger. There is absolutely no doubt he was a declared adversary of the regime.

Siegfried Bröse, relieved of his functions as subprefect by the Nazis in 1933, and subsequently one of Heidegger's teaching assistants, wrote to the de-Nazification hearing:

One could see – and this was often confirmed to me by the students – that Heidegger lectures were attended en masse because the students wanted to form a rule to guide their own conduct by hearing National Socialism characterized in all its non-truth... Heidegger's lectures were attended not only by students but also by people with long-standing professions and even by retired people, and every time I had the occasion to talk with these people, what came back incessantly was their admiration for the courage with which Heidegger, from the height of his philosophical position and in the rigor of his starting point, attacked National Socialism.

Equally, Hermine Rohner, a student from 1940 to 1943, bears testimony to the fact Heidegger "wasn't afraid, as for him, even in front of students from all faculties (so not only "his" students), to attack National Socialism so openly that I hunched up my shoulders."

Due to what he calls Heidegger's "spiritual resistance", Czech resistance fighter and former Heidegger student Jan Patočka included him among his "heroes of our times".

The testimony of Karl Löwith – who was not in Germany – sounds different. He was another of Heidegger's students, aided by Heidegger in 1933 in obtaining a fellowship to study in Rome, where he lived between 1934 and 1936. In 1936, Heidegger visited Rome to lecture on Hölderlin, and had a meeting with Löwith. In an account set down in 1940 and not intended for publication, Löwith noted that Heidegger was wearing a swastika pin, even though he knew that Löwith was Jewish. Löwith recounted their discussion about editorials published in the Neue Zürcher Zeitung:

He left no doubt about his faith in Hitler; only two things that he had underestimated: the vitality of the Christian churches and the obstacles to the Anschluss in Austria. Now, as before, he was convinced that National Socialism was the prescribed path for Germany.

[I] told him that [...] my opinion was that his taking the side of National Socialism was in agreement with the essence of his philosophy. Heidegger told me unreservedly that I was right and developed his idea by saying that his idea of historicity [Geschichtlichkeit] was the foundation for his political involvement.

In response to my remark that I could understand many things about his attitude, with one exception, which was that he would permit himself to be seated at the same table with a figure such as Julius Streicher (at the German Academy of Law), he was silent at first. At last he uttered this well-known rationalisation (which Karl Barth saw so clearly), which amounted to saying that "it all would have been much worse if some men of knowledge had not been involved." And with a bitter resentment towards people of culture, he concluded his statement: "If these gentlemen had not considered themselves too refined to become involved, things would have been different, but I had to stay in there alone." To my reply that one did not have to be very refined to refuse to work with a Streicher, he answered that it was useless to discuss Streicher; Der Stürmer was nothing more than "pornography." Why didn't Hitler get rid of this sinister individual? He didn't understand it.

For commentators such as Habermas who credit Löwith's account, there are a number of generally shared implications: one is that Heidegger did not turn away from National Socialism per se but became deeply disaffected with the official philosophy and ideology of the party, as embodied by Alfred Bäumler or Alfred Rosenberg, whose biologistic racist doctrines he never accepted.

=== Post-war ===
During the hearings of the Denazification Committee, Hannah Arendt, Heidegger's former student and lover, who was Jewish, spoke on his behalf. (Arendt very cautiously resumed her friendship with Heidegger after the war, despite or even because of the widespread contempt for Heidegger and his political sympathies, and despite his being forbidden to teach for many years.) Heidegger's former friend Karl Jaspers spoke against him, suggesting he would have a detrimental influence on German students because of his powerful teaching presence.

In September 1945, the Denazification Committee published its report on Heidegger. He was charged on four counts: his important, official position in the Nazi regime; his introduction of the Führerprinzip into the University; his engaging in Nazi propaganda and his incitement of students against "reactionary" professors. He was subsequently dismissed from university the same year. In March 1949, he was declared a "follower" (Mitläufer) of Nazism by the State Commission for Political Purification. But he was reintegrated in 1951, given emeritus status, and continued teaching until 1976. In 1974, he wrote to his friend Heinrich Petzet: "Our Europe is being ruined from below with 'democracy'".

Thomas Sheehan has noted "Heidegger's stunning silence concerning the Holocaust," in contrast to his criticism of the alienation wrought by modern technologies: "We have his statements about the six millions unemployed at the beginning of the Nazi regime, but not a word about the six million who were dead at the end of it." Heidegger did not publish anything concerning the Holocaust or the extermination camps, but did indeed mention them. In a 1949 lecture entitled "Das Ge-stell" ("Enframing"), he stated:

Agriculture is now a motorized food-industry – in essence, the same as the manufacturing of corpses in gas chambers and extermination camps, the same as the blockading and starving of nations [the Berlin blockade was then active], the same as the manufacture of hydrogen bombs.

Commentators differ on whether these statements are evidence of a profound disregard for the fate of the Jews, or a recontextualization of their suffering in terms of the mechanization of life and death. The French Jewish philosopher Jean-Claude Milner once said: "It's a fact, as to gas chambers, the only proper philosophical sentence is by Heidegger [...] It is not satisfactory, but no one else did better." Heidegger's defenders have pointed to the deep ecology dimension of Heidegger's critique of technological "enframing" – i.e., that the way human beings relate to nature has a determining influence on the way we relate to one another. At least Heidegger does not say that the mechanization of agriculture and the extermination camps are equivalent, "the same thing" (dasselbe) but "the same" (das Selbe, a very strange turn of phrase in German), so only "in essence", but not in the technical or metaphysical meaning of identity. Heidegger explained during his lecture: "The same is never the equivalent (das Gleiche). The same is no more only the indistinctive coincidence of the identical. The same is rather the relation of the different."

Moreover, many of those who align themselves with Heidegger philosophically have pointed out that in his work on "being-towards-death" we can recognize a much more salient criticism of what was wrong with the mass-produced murder of a people. Thinkers as diverse as Giorgio Agamben and Judith Butler have made this point sympathetically. It might be worth pointing out that the SS physician Josef Mengele, the so-called "Angel of Death", was the son of the founder of a company that produced major farm machinery under the name Karl Mengele & Sons. This side of Heidegger's thinking can be seen in another controversial lecture from the same period, Die Gefahr ("The Danger"):

Hundreds of thousands die en masse. Do they die? They succumb. They are done in. Do they die? They become mere quanta, items in an inventory in the business of manufacturing corpses. Do they die? They are liquidated inconspicuously in extermination camps. And even apart from that, right now millions of impoverished people are perishing from hunger in China. But to die is to endure death in its essence. To be able to die means to be capable of this endurance. We are capable of this only if the essence of death makes our own essence possible.

In other words, according to Heidegger, the victims of death camps were deprived not only of their life, but of the dignity of an authentic death, since they were "liquidated" as if they were inventory or problematic accounting, rather than killed in combat as one would kill an enemy.

Another citation levied against Heidegger by his critics, is his answer to a question by his former student Herbert Marcuse, concerning his silence about the Nazi racial policies. In a letter to Marcuse, he wrote:

I can add only that instead of the word "Jews" [in your letter] there should be the word "East Germans", and then exactly the same [terror] holds true of one of the Allies, with the difference that everything that has happened since 1945 is public knowledge world-wide, whereas the bloody terror of the Nazis was in fact kept a secret from the German people.

The reference to East Germans concerns the expulsion of Germans after World War II from territories across eastern Europe, which displaced about 15 million and killed another 0.5–0.6 million, involved gang-rapes and looting throughout East Germany, East Prussia, and Austria, and harshly punitive de-industrialization policies.

==== Der Spiegel interview ====
On September 23, 1966, Heidegger was interviewed by Rudolf Augstein and Georg Wolff for Der Spiegel magazine, in which he agreed to discuss his political past provided that the interview be published posthumously (it was published on May 31, 1976). At his own insistence, Heidegger edited the published version of the interview extensively. In the interview, Heidegger defends his involvement with the Nazi party on two points: first, that he was trying to save the university from being completely taken over by the Nazis, and therefore he tried to work with them. Second, he saw in the historic moment the possibility for an "awakening" (Aufbruch) which might help to find a "new national and social approach" to the problem of Germany's future, a kind of middle ground between capitalism and communism. For example, when Heidegger talked about a "national and social approach" to political problems, he linked this to Friedrich Naumann. According to Thomas Sheehan, Naumann had "the vision of a strong nationalism and a militantly anticommunist socialism, combined under a charismatic leader who would fashion a middle-European empire that preserved the spirit and traditions of pre-industrial Germany even as it appropriated, in moderation, the gains of modern technology".

After 1934, Heidegger was more critical of the Nazi government, largely prompted by the violence of the Night of the Long Knives. When the interviewers asked him about the 1935 lecture in which he had referred to the "inner truth and greatness of [the National Socialist] movement" (i.e. the lecture now incorporated into the book Introduction to Metaphysics; see above), Heidegger said that he used this phrase so that Nazi informants who observed his lectures would understand him to be praising Nazism, but his dedicated students would know this statement was no eulogy for the Nazi party. Rather, he meant it as he expressed it in the parenthetical clarification added in 1953, namely, as "the confrontation of planetary technology and modern humanity."

Karl Löwith's account of his meeting with Heidegger in 1936 (discussed above) has been cited to rebut these contentions. According to Löwith, Heidegger did not make any decisive break with Nazism in 1934, and Heidegger was willing to entertain more profound relations between his philosophy and political involvement than he would subsequently admit.

The Der Spiegel interviewers were not in possession of most of the evidence for Heidegger's Nazi sympathies now known, and thus their questions did not press too strongly on those points. In particular, the Der Spiegel interviewers did not bring up Heidegger's 1949 quotation comparing the industrialization of agriculture to the extermination camps. Interestingly, Der Spiegel journalist Georg Wolff had been an SS-Hauptsturmführer with the Sicherheitsdienst, stationed in Oslo during World War II, and had been writing articles with antisemitic and racist overtones in Der Spiegel since war's end.

==== Meeting with Paul Celan ====
In 1967, Heidegger met with the poet Paul Celan, a Jew who had survived concentration camps operated by the Nazis' Romanian allies. On July 24 Celan gave a reading at the University of Freiburg, attended by Heidegger. Heidegger there presented Celan with a copy of What is Called Thinking?, and invited him to visit him at his hut at Todtnauberg, an invitation which Celan accepted. On July 25 Celan visited Heidegger at his retreat, signing the guestbook and spending some time walking and talking with Heidegger. The details of their conversation are not known, but the meeting was the subject of a subsequent poem by Celan, entitled "Todtnauberg" (dated August 1, 1967). The enigmatic poem and the encounter have been discussed by numerous writers on Heidegger and Celan, notably Philippe Lacoue-Labarthe. A common interpretation of the poem is that it concerns, in part, Celan's wish for Heidegger to apologize for his behavior during the Nazi era.

== The Farias and Faye controversies ==
Although Heidegger's involvement with Nazism was known and had already divided philosophers, the publication, in 1987, of Victor Farias' book Heidegger and Nazism provoked the topic to an open controversy. Farias had access to many documents, including some preserved in the STASI archives. The book, which tries to show that Heidegger supported Hitler and his racial policies and also denounced or demoted colleagues, was highly acclaimed but also starkly criticised. The American philosopher Richard Rorty declared that "Farias' book includes more concrete information relevant to Heidegger's relations with the Nazis than anything else available", while French philosopher Roger-Pol Droit commented: "Mercilessly well-informed, this book is a bomb".

Farias was accused of poor scholarship and sensationalism. In Germany, Hans-Georg Gadamer, a former student of Heidegger, denounced Farias' "grotesque superficiality" and historian Hugo Ott remarked that Farias' methodology was unacceptable in historical research. In France, philosopher Jacques Derrida said Farias's work was "sometimes so rough one wonders if the investigator [has read] Heidegger [for] more than an hour", while Paul Celan's translator Pierre Joris described it as "a savage attempt to demolish Heidegger's thought". François Fédier, one of Heidegger's friends and translators, claimed he could refute all Farias' allegations point by point.

In 2005, the controversy was renewed after Emmanuel Faye published a book with the provocative title Heidegger: The Introduction of Nazism into Philosophy. Faye claims that Heidegger's philosophy was close to Nazism and that fascist and racist ideas are so woven into the fabric of his thought that it does not deserve to be called philosophy. Rather, according to Faye, Heidegger's work should be classified as part of the history of Nazism rather than as philosophy. A debate on the subject that involved Faye and François Fédier was broadcast on French television in 2007. A group of specialists gathered by Fédier (Heidegger, all the more reason) heavily criticized Faye for his lack of competence in German and for faking or falsifying quotations.

Numerous other Heidegger scholars, themselves critical of Heidegger's relation to Nazism, have taken issue with Faye's claims. For example, Richard Wolin, a close reader of the Heidegger controversy since Farias's book, has said that he is not convinced by Faye's position, despite Wolin himself drawing links between Heidegger and antisemitism. Peter Gordon, in a long review of Faye's book raises a handful of objections, including the accusation that Faye lets his own philosophical leanings prevent him from treating Heidegger fairly.

Recently the thesis of Faye's followers F. Rastier and S. Kellerer, that Heidegger's membership in Hans Frank's committee for philosophy of right (from 1934 until at least 1936) included a participation in the holocaust was rejected by K. Nassirin, according to whom "the supposed great discovery only proves the denunciatory zeal of Heidegger's opponents".

=== Heidegger's antisemitism ===
==== Support ====
Emmanuel Faye claims Heidegger criticized the "Jewification" ("Verjudung") of German universities in 1916 and in 1929, and favored instead the promotion of the "German race" ("die deutsche Rasse"). Faye also claims that Heidegger said of Spinoza that he was "ein Fremdkörper in der Philosophie", a "foreign body in philosophy" – according to Faye, Fremdkörper was a term that belonged to Nazi vocabulary and not to classical German. This quote is not to be found in Heidegger's writings, and Rüdiger Safranski reports that Heidegger in the 1930s defended Spinoza during a lecture, arguing that if Spinoza's philosophy is Jewish, then the whole of philosophy from Leibniz to Hegel is Jewish as well.

Farias states that the widow of Ernst Cassirer claimed she had heard of Heidegger's "inclination to anti-Semitism" by 1929. Farias says that in June 1933, Karl Jaspers criticized The Protocols of the Elders of Zion, a propaganda book supporting antisemitic conspiracy theories, and Jaspers recalled much later that Heidegger had responded: "But there is a dangerous international alliance of Jews."

Heidegger commented on the Nazi identification of Judaism and Communism in 1936, writing that:

The final form of Marxism [...] has essentially nothing to do with either Judaism or even with Russia; if somewhere a non-developed spiritualism is still slumbering, it is in the Russian people; Bolshevism is originally Western; it is a European possibility: the emergence of the masses, industry, technology, the extinction of Christianity; but inasmuch as the dominance of reason as an equalizing of everyone is but the consequence of Christianity and as the latter is fundamentally of Jewish origin (cf. Nietzsche's thought on the slave revolt with respect to morality), Bolshevism is in fact Jewish; but then Christianity is also fundamentally Bolshevist!

First published in 2014, Heidegger's Black Notebooks, written between 1931 and 1970, contain several antisemitic statements, leading to more re-evaluation of the issue. Adam Knowles documents the deep ties between Heidegger's philosophy of language and völkisch antisemitism in the Black Notebooks.

==== Opposition ====
Despite being a member of the Nazi party, Heidegger intervened as rector to help several other Jewish colleagues. He wrote appeals in defense of three Jewish professors, including Fränkel, all of whom were about to be fired for racial reasons. Heidegger also helped certain Jewish students and colleagues to emigrate, such as Karl Löwith and his assistant Werner Brock, who found a position respectively in Italy and in England with Heidegger's assistance.

According to scholar Jesús Adrián Escudero, "It seems that for every piece of evidence for anti-Semitism there is another piece of evidence against it". According to him, it is clear that Heidegger rejected the Nazi ideology of racial and biological oppression. The Black Notebooks confirmed that Heidegger rejected the "biologically grounded racism" of the Nazis, replacing it with linguistic-historical heritage. Jesús Adrián Escudero states that this could be qualified as "religious", "cultural", or "spiritual". The philosopher Charles Blattberg has argued that this reflects Heidegger's "metaphysical antisemitism."

Karl Jaspers testified in his report of December 1945: "In the twenties, Heidegger was no anti-Semite. With respect to this question he did not always exercise discretion. This doesn't rule out the possibility that, as I must assume, in other cases anti-Semitism went against his conscience and his taste."

There were "rumors" that Heidegger was antisemitic by 1932, and he was aware of them, and vehemently denied them, calling them "slander" in a letter to Hannah Arendt. In response to her concern about these rumors that he was becoming antisemitic, Heidegger wrote:

This man who comes anyway and urgently wants to write a dissertation is a Jew. The man who comes to see me every month to report on a large work in progress is also a Jew. The man who sent me a substantial text for an urgent reading a few weeks ago is a Jew. The two fellows whom I helped get accepted in the last three semesters are Jews. The man who, with my help, got a stipend to go to Rome is a Jew. Whoever wants to call this 'raging anti-Semitism' is welcome to do so. Beyond that, I am now just as much an anti-Semite in University issues as I was ten years ago in Marburg. To say absolutely nothing about my personal relationships with Jews [e.g. Husserl, Misch, Cassirer, and others]. And above all it cannot touch my relationship to you.

According to Karl Löwith, several Nazis themselves seemed not to believe in Heidegger's antisemitism:

The petty-bourgeois orthodoxy of the party was suspicious of Heidegger's National Socialism insofar as Jewish and racial considerations played no role. [His book] Sein und Zeit [Being and Time] was dedicated to the Jew Husserl, his Kant-book to the half-Jew Scheler, and in his courses at Freiburg, Bergson and Simmel were taught. His spiritual concerns did not seem to conform to those of the "Nordic race", which cared little about Angst in the face of nothingness. Conversely, Professor H. Naumann did not hesitate to explain German mythology with the help of concepts from Sein und Zeit, discovering "care" in Odin and the "they" in Baldur. Yet neither the aforementioned disdain nor approval of his National Socialist credentials counts for much in itself. Heidegger's decision for Hitler went far beyond simple agreement with the ideology and program of the Party. He was and remained a National Socialist, as did Ernst Jünger, who was certainly on the margins and isolated, but nevertheless far from being without influence. Heidegger’s influence came through the radicalism with which he based the freedom of one's ownmost individual as well as German dasein [being-there] on the manifestness of the naught (des Nichts).

== Defenders of Heidegger ==
Hannah Arendt, Jonathan Rée, Justin Burke, Jacques Derrida,, Jean Baudrillard and Allan Bloom, among others, see his involvement with Nazism as a mistake rather than a necessary, consistent result of Heidegger's thinking. They argue that Heidegger's philosophy did not inherently determine his politics and vice versa. They may also argue that factors beyond Heidegger's philosophy, or even beyond Heidegger's control, shaped Heidegger's actions in Nazi Germany.

In his preface to Heidegger's Zollikon Seminars, Medard Boss writes: "I made inquiries and Heidegger very clearly seemed to be the most slandered man I had ever encountered. He had become entangled in a network of lies by his colleagues. Most of the people, who were unable to do serious harm to the substance of Heidegger's thinking, tried to get at Heidegger the man with personal attacks. The only remaining puzzle was why Heidegger did not defend himself against these slanders publicly." Fédier comments on this point with Nietzsche's remark that "the philosopher has to be the bad conscience of his age." In 2015 Nils Gilje, professor of philosophy at University of Bergen, said to media that "There is little that indicates that Heidegger defended the more or less official German racial politics".

== See also ==
- Hitler card
- Interpretations of the will to power
- Nazism and race
- Nietzsche's views on women

== Bibliography ==
- Jacques Derrida, "Heidegger, l'enfer des philosophes", Le Nouvel Observateur, Paris, 6–12 November 1987.
- Victor Farias, Heidegger and Nazism, Temple University Press (1989) ISBN 0-87722-640-7.
- Emmanuel Faye, Heidegger, l'introduction du nazisme dans la philosophie, Albin Michel, 2005.
- François Fédier, Heidegger. Anatomie d'un scandale, Robert Laffont, Paris, 1988. ISBN 2-221-05658-2.
- François Fédier (ed.), Martin Heidegger, Écrits politiques 1933–1966, Gallimard, Paris, 1995. ISBN 2-07-073277-0.
- François Fédier (ed.), Heidegger, à plus forte raison, Paris: Fayard, 2007.
- Luc Ferry & Alain Renaut (1988). Heidegger et les Modernes, Gallimard, 1988.
- Luc Ferry & Alain Renaut, Système et critique, Ousia, Bruxelles, 1992.
- Dominique Janicaud, L'ombre de cette pensée, Jerôme Millon, 1990.
- Hans Jonas: "Heidegger and Theology", The Phenomenon of Life: Toward a Philosophical Biology (Evanston, Illinois: Northwestern University Press, 2001) ISBN 0-8101-1749-5.
- Adam Knowles, Heidegger's Fascist Affinities: A Politics of Silence (Stanford: Stanford University Press, 2019). ISBN 978-1-5036-0878-8
- Hans Köchler, Politik und Theologie bei Heidegger. Politischer Aktionismus und theologische Mystik nach "Sein und Zeit". Innsbruck: AWP, 1991. ISBN 3-900719-02-0.
- Philippe Lacoue-Labarthe, La fiction du politique, Bourgois, 1987 (translated as Heidegger, Art and Politics).
- Philippe Lacoue-Labarthe discusses Heidegger's Nazism at length in the film, The Ister, 2004.
- George Leaman, Heidegger im Kontext: Gesamtüberblick zum NS-Engagement der Universitätsphilosophen, Argument Verlag, Hamburg, 1993. ISBN 3-88619-205-9.
- Jean-François Lyotard, Heidegger and the Jews, 1990.
- Günther Neske & Emil Kettering (eds.), Martin Heidegger and National Socialism: Questions and Answers, 1990.
- Ernst Nolte Martin Heidegger. Politik und Geschichte im Leben und Denken, Propyläen, 1992
- Hugo Ott, Martin Heidegger: A Political Life, transl. by A. Blunden, New York: Basic, 1993.
- Guillaume Payen, Martin Heidegger's Changing Destinies: Catholicism, Revolution, Nazism. Translated by Jane Marie Todd and Steven Rendall, Yale University Press, 2023.
- Jean-Michel Palmier, Les Écrits politiques de Heidegger, Éditions de l'Herne, Paris, 1968
- Tom Rockmore, On Heidegger's Nazism and Philosophy, University of California Press, 1992.
- Rüdiger Safranski, Martin Heidegger: Between Good and Evil, transl. by E. Osers, Harvard University Press, 1999.
- Guido Schneeberger: Nachlese zu Heidegger: Dokumente zu seinem Leben und Denken (Bern, 1962) OCLC 2086368.
- Hans Sluga, Heidegger's Crisis: Philosophy and Politics in Nazi Germany
- Richard Wolin, The Heidegger Controversy: A Critical Reader, 1990 ISBN 0-262-73101-0.
