= Martin Heidegger. Politik und Geschichte im Leben und Denken =

1992 book by Ernst Nolte

Martin Heidegger
- Author: Ernst Nolte
- Language: German
- Subject: Martin Heidegger
- Publisher: Propyläen Verlag
- Publication date: 1992
- Publication place: Germany
- Pages: 330
- ISBN: 3549072414

Martin Heidegger. Politik und Geschichte im Leben und Denken (lit. 'Martin Heidegger: Politics and History in the Life and Thought') is a 1992 book by the German historian Ernst Nolte.

== Summary ==
Nolte investigates and analyses the German philosopher Martin Heidegger's works and commitments in relation to his support for Nazi Germany. Nolte dismisses attempts to portray Heidegger's support as insincere or caused by personal failings. He describes it as a principled choice by Heidegger when liberalism had failed and there was an imminent threat from international communism.

== Reception ==
Thomas Sheehan and Richard Wolin analysed the book's role in strategical positioning related to Heidegger's philosophy, the legacy of National Socialist Germany, and contemporary Germans. Sheehan wrote that with Nolte's book, the "strategy for defending Heidegger enters a radically new phase", due to its dismissal of strategies that downplay Heidegger's political commitment. Wolin wrote that Nolte makes a "truly original and shocking gambit" in the debate on Heidegger and Nazism and "merely uses Heidegger's case as a pretext for an elaborate and cynical exercise in German neonational exoneration". In Heidegger Studies, Pascal David criticised a tendency to reduce the study of Heidegger's thinking to a matter of strategy, prevalent in the reception of the Nolte book.
