= Joseph S. O'Leary =

Irish Roman Catholic theologian (born 1949)

Joseph Stephen O'Leary
- Born: Cork, Ireland
- Awards: Frederick J. Streng Book Award(1999)

Philosophical work
- Era: Contemporary philosophy, theology, patristics, comparative philosophy of religion, Buddhist–Christian dialogue
- Region: Western philosophy
- School: Historical theology, continental philosophy, English literature, German literature, French literature
- Institutions: Sophia University, Dublin City University
- Main interests: Plotinus, Kant, Hegel, Heidegger, Derrida, Lacan, Origen, Athanasius, Gregory of Nyssa, Augustine, Luther, Jansenism, Newman, Modernism, Karl Barth, Karl Rahner, Vatican II, Henry James, T. S. Eliot, Yeats, Joyce, Beckett, Rilke, Thomas Mann, Mallarmé, Proust, Claudel, Milton, Racine, Goethe, Hölderlin, Wordsworth, and Shelley

Joseph Stephen O'Leary (born 1949) is an Irish Roman Catholic theologian. He was born in Cork, Ireland. He studied literature and theology at Maynooth College (BA 1969; DD 1976). He also studied at the Gregorian University, Rome (1972–1973), and in Paris (1977–1979). Ordained for the Diocese of Cork and Ross in 1973, he was a chaplain at University College Cork (1980–1981). He taught theology at the University of Notre Dame (1981–1982) and Duquesne University (1982–1983) before moving to Japan in August 1983. He worked as a researcher at the Nanzan Institute for Religion and Culture, Nanzan University, Nagoya (1985–1986), where he later held the Roche Chair for Interreligious Research (2015–2016). He taught in the Faculty of Letters at Sophia University, Tokyo, from 1988 to 2015.

Other assignments include teaching philosophy and theology in the Philippines in 1986–1987, the Lady Donnellan Lecturership at Trinity College Dublin in the spring of 1991, the Chaire Étienne Gilson at the Institut Catholique de Paris, March 2011, and visiting fellowships at Katholieke Universiteit Leuven in 1997 and the Humboldt Universität, Berlin (with the Romano Guardini Stiftung), in 2012.

O'Leary is editorial assistant to The Japan Mission Journal, which often publishes articles of interreligious interest, and is a regular participant in the Tokyo Buddhist Discussion Group. He frequently attends academic conferences, including the quadrennial Origenianum and Gregory of Nyssa conferences, the Oxford Patristic Conference, the biennial Enrico Castelli conference in philosophy of religion (University of Rome La Sapienza), the International James Joyce Symposium, the International Association for the Study of Irish Literatures, the International Association for Buddhist Studies, and many conferences held at Cerisy-la-Salle in Normandy.

With Richard Kearney and William Desmond, O'Leary was named one of "three Irish philosophers plying their trade abroad" in the Irish Times (2003).

== Study of literature ==
Returning to academic involvement with literature in 1988 he focused in his teaching on Henry James, T. S. Eliot, Yeats, Joyce, and Beckett. Derrida, Lacan, and Blanchot became key theoretical references. In addition to English literature he taught courses on European culture and on the Bible as literature. He remains concerned with the theological significance of modernist literature and is currently working on a book on Joyce from this perspective.

== Study of theology ==
In his graduate studies in theology at Maynooth, O'Leary specialized in patristics, working on Augustine's De Trinitate (with much reference to Augustine's dialogue with Plotinus) for his doctoral thesis. In Paris he attended courses on patristics by Pierre Nautin and Charles Kannengiesser. Discussing Heidegger and theology with Jean Beaufret, François Fédier, François Vezin, Emmanuel Martineau, Jean-François Courtine, Jean-Luc Marion, Stanislas Breton, Jean Greisch, and Maria Villela-Petit, he developed a critical approach to patristic tradition drawing on the Heideggerian project of overcoming metaphysics. With Richard Kearney he organized a seminar at the Irish College, Paris, on 24 June 1979, in which Beaufret, Ricoeur, and Emmanuel Levinas participated, and which led to the publication of Heidegger te la question de Dieu (Grasset, 1980; 2nd ed., PUF 2009).

The Heideggerian approach was spelled out programmatically in his first book, Questioning Back: The Overcoming of Metaphysics in Christian Tradition (Minneapolis: Winston-Seabury 1985), which also showed the influence of Derrida and of his first encounters with Buddhist philosophy. This book sketches a strategy for rereading Christian texts in a counter-metaphysical key. Though convinced of the truth and validity of classical Christian metaphysical theology, O'Leary is also convinced of the need to "step back" behind it to the "matter itself", that is, to the phenomenality of the biblical events in the horizons of contemporary understanding. Drawing on Heidegger to renew the old questions of Luther and Harnack about the patristic synthesis of the Bible and Greek thought, he advocates a deconstructive method of reading patristic texts that brings out the tensions and flaws in the Athens-Jerusalem syntheses as they show up in the texture of the writing of Origen, Gregory of Nyssa, and Augustine. He has since published a number of essays on these patristic authors, in particular a book-length study, Christianisme et philosophie chez Origène (Paris: Éditions du Cerf, Philosophie & Théologie, 2011).

The theme of religious pluralism comes to the fore in his second book, La vérité chrétienne à l'âge du pluralisme religieux (Éditions du Cerf, Cogitatio Fidei, 1994) and its rewritten English version, Religious Pluralism and Christian Truth (Edinburgh University Press, 1996). He attempts to tackle this theme with philosophical finesse in a critical dialogue with Derrida.

Conceiving theology as a play of reflective judgment in a mobile and pluralistic context, O'Leary explored the possibilities of a Buddhist-inspired theological conventionalism in L'art du jugement en théologie (Éditions du Cerf, Cogitatio Fidei, 2011) and again in Conventional and Ultimate Truth: A Key for Fundamental Theology (University of Notre Dame Press, Thresholds in Philosophy and Theology, ed. Jeffrey Bloechl and Kevin Hart, 2015). The latter book expounds a basic method under the rubrics of reflective judgment and conventional truth. Then it visits seven loci that challenge theological thinking today: modernist literature, metaphysics and its overcoming, scripture, religious experience, negative theology, religious pluralism, and dogma. In each case classical paradigms are unsettled and a more modest and flexible path of reflection and articulation is limned.

These volumes on fundamental theology advance a view of doctrinal language that is increasingly influenced by the Buddhist dyad of conventional and ultimate truth. The basic thesis is that religious traditions can function as vehicles of ultimacy, but that to do so authentically and effectively they need to fully recognize their conventional status as linguistic constructions embedded in history. Warding off nominalism and relativism, O'Leary argues against Derrida and Western interpreters of Nagarjuna on the notion of truth, in order to uphold the objective reference of doctrinal statements despite their conventional fabric.

Further fruits of O'Leary's engagement with Buddhist philosophy are his Étienne Gilson lectures at the Institut Catholique de Paris, 2011 (published as Philosophie occidentale et concepts bouddhistes, PUF, 2011), and his forthcoming commentary on the Vimalakirti Sutra for the collection Christian Commentaries on Non-Christian Sacred Texts (ed. Catherine Cornille).

== Bibliography ==
=== Books (author) ===
- Questioning Back: The Overcoming of Metaphysics in Christian Tradition. Minneapolis: Winston-Seabury, 1985.
  - Extract: "Overcoming the Nicene Creed". Cross Currents 34 (1984):405–413.
- La Vérité chrétienne à l'âge du pluralisme religieux. Paris: Éditions du Cerf (Cogitatio Fidei), 1994.
- Religious Pluralism and Christian Truth. Edinburgh University Press, 1996.
- L'Art du jugement en théologie. Paris: Éditions du Cerf (Cogitatio Fidei), 2011.
- Christianisme et philosophie chez Origène. Paris: Éditions du Cerf (Philosophie & Théologie), 2011.
- Philosophie occidentale et concepts bouddhistes. Paris: Presses Universitaires de France (Chaire Gilson), 2011.
- Conventional and Ultimate Truth: A Key for Fundamental Theology. University of Notre Dame Press, 2015.
- Buddhist Nonduality, Paschal Paradox: A Christian Commentary on the Teaching of Vimalakirti (Vimalakirti-nirdesa). Peeters, 2018.
- Reality Itself: Philosophical Challenges of Indian Mahāyāna. Nagoya: Chisokudō, 2019.
- Joysis Crisis: Rereading James Joyce, Theomasochistically. Nagoya: Chisokudō, 2021.
- Irreducible Ireland: Moore, Wilde, Yeats, Joyce, Beckett. Nagoya: Chisokudō, 2024.

=== Edited books and translations ===
- Heidegger et la question de Dieu. Éditions Bernard Grasset (Figures), 1980. Ed. Richard Kearney and J. S. O'Leary. 2nd ed. Paris: Presses Universitaires de France, 2009.
- Nishida Kitarō, Intuition and Reflection in Self-Consciousness. Trans. Y. Takeuchi, V. H. Viglielmo, and J. S. O'Leary. State University of New York Press, 1987.
- Heinrich Dumoulin, Zen Buddhism in the 20th Century. Translated and adapted by J. S. O'Leary. Weatherhill, 1992.
- Heinrich Dumoulin, Understanding Buddhism: Key Themes. Translated and adapted by J. S. O'Leary. Weatherhill, 1994.
- Buddhist Spirituality I (World Spirituality: An Encyclopedic History of the Religious Quest 8). Ed. Y. Takeuchi, J. Van Bragt, J. W. Heisig, J. S. O'Leary, and P. L. Swanson. Crossroad, 1993.
- Buddhist Spirituality II (World Spirituality 9). Ed. Y. Takeuchi, J. W. Heisig, J. S. O'Leary, and P. L. Swanson. Crossroad, 1999.
- Theological Fringes of Phenomenology. Ed. Joseph Rivera and J. S. O'Leary. Routledge, 2023.
