= Philippe Lacoue-Labarthe =

French philosopher, literary critic, and translator

- Born: 6 March 1940; Tours, France
- Died: 28 January 2007 (aged 66); Paris, France

Education
- Education: University of Bordeaux
- Doctoral advisor: Gérard Granel

Philosophical work
- Era: 20th-century philosophy
- Region: Western philosophy
- School: Continental philosophy Deconstruction
- Institutions: University of Strasbourg II
- Main interests: Literary criticism Tragedy
- Notable ideas: The literary Absolute

Philippe Lacoue-Labarthe (/ləˈkuː ləˈbɑːrt/ lə-KOO lə-BART; French: [laku labaʁt]; 6 March 1940 – 28 January 2007) was a French philosopher. He was also a literary critic and translator. Lacoue-Labarthe published several influential works with his friend Jean-Luc Nancy.

Lacoue-Labarthe was influenced by and wrote extensively on Martin Heidegger, Jacques Derrida, Jacques Lacan, German Romanticism, Paul Celan, and Gérard Granel. He also translated works by Heidegger, Celan, Friedrich Nietzsche, Friedrich Hölderlin, and Walter Benjamin into French.

Lacoue-Labarthe was a member and president of the Collège international de philosophie.

== Philosophical work ==
=== Collaboration with Jean-Luc Nancy ===
Lacoue-Labarthe wrote several books and articles in collaboration with Jean-Luc Nancy, a colleague at the Université Marc Bloch (Strasbourg II) in Strasbourg. Early collaborations included Le Titre de la lettre: une lecture de Lacan (1973; trans., The Title of the Letter: A Reading of Lacan) and L'Absolu littéraire: théorie de la littérature du romantisme allemand (1978; trans., The Literary Absolute: The Theory of Literature in German Romanticism).

In 1980 Lacoue-Labarthe and Nancy organized a conference at Cerisy-la-Salle, centered around Derrida's 1968 paper Les fins de l'homme. Following this conference and at Derrida's request, in November 1980 Lacoue-Labarthe and Nancy founded the Centre de recherches philosophiques sur le politique (Centre for Philosophical Research on the Political). The Centre operated for four years, pursuing philosophical rather than empirical approaches to political questions. During that period Lacoue-Labarthe and Nancy produced several important papers, together and separately. Some of these texts appear in Les Fins de l'homme à partir du travail de Jacques Derrida: colloque de Cerisy, 23 juillet-2 août 1980 (1981), Rejouer le politique (1981), La retrait du politique (1983), and Le mythe nazi (1991, revised edition; originally published as Les méchanismes du fascisme, 1981). Many of these texts are gathered in translation in Retreating the Political (1997).

=== On Martin Heidegger ===
In 1986 Lacoue-Labarthe published a book on Celan and Heidegger entitled La poésie comme expérience (1986; trans., Poetry as Experience). Lacoue-Labarthe received his doctorat d'état in 1987 with a jury led by Gérard Granel and including Derrida, George Steiner and Jean-François Lyotard. The monograph submitted for that degree was La fiction du politique (1988; trans., Heidegger, Art, and Politics), a study of Heidegger's relation to National Socialism. These works predate the explosion of interest in the political dimensions of Heidegger's thought which followed the publication of a book by Victor Farías.

In Poetry as Experience Lacoue-Labarthe argued that, even though Celan's poetry was deeply informed by Heidegger's philosophy, Celan was long aware of Heidegger's association with the Nazi party and therefore fundamentally circumspect toward the man and transformative in his reception of his work. Celan was nonetheless willing to meet Heidegger. Heidegger was a professed admirer of Celan's writing, although Celan's poetry never received the kind of philosophical attention which Heidegger gave to the work of poets such as Friedrich Hölderlin or Georg Trakl. Celan's poem "Todtnauberg," however, seems to hold out the possibility of a rapprochement between their work. In this respect Heidegger's work was perhaps redeemable for Celan, even if that redemption was not played out in the encounter between the two men.

Lacoue-Labarthe considered that Heidegger's greatest failure was not his involvement in the National Socialist movement but his "silence on the extermination" and his refusal to engage in a thorough deconstruction of Nazism. He also believed, however, that Heidegger's thought offers pathways to a philosophical confrontation with Nazism, pathways which Heidegger failed to follow, but which Lacoue-Labarthe did attempt to pursue.

== Theatrical work ==
Lacoue-Labarthe was also involved in theatrical productions. He translated Hölderlin's version of Antigone, and collaborated with Michel Deutsch to stage the work at the Théâtre national de Strasbourg on 15 and 30 June 1978. Lacoue-Labarthe and Deutsch returned to the Théâtre national de Strasbourg to collaborate on a 1980 production of Euripides' Phoenician Women. Lacoue-Labarthe's translation of Hölderlin's version of Oedipus Rex was staged in Avignon in 1998, with Charles Berling in the title role.

== Bibliography ==
French				English
Le Titre de la lettre: une lecture de Lacan	1973	ISBN 2-7186-0002-0	with Jean-Luc Nancy	The Title of the Letter: A Reading of Lacan	1992	ISBN 0-7914-0962-7	trans. François Raffoul and David Pettigrew
L'Absolu littéraire: théorie de la littérature du romantisme allemand	1978	ISBN 2-02-004936-8	with Jean-Luc Nancy	The Literary Absolute: The Theory of Literature in German Romanticism	1988	ISBN 0-88706-661-5	trans. Philip Barnard and Cheryl Lester
Portrait de l'artiste, en général	1979	ISBN 2-267-00162-4
Le Sujet de la philosophie: Typographies 1	1979	ISBN 2-08-226011-9		The Subject of Philosophy	1993	ISBN 0-8166-1698-1	trans. Thomas Trezise, Hugh J. Silverman et al.*
Les Fins de l'homme à partir du travail de Jacques Derrida: colloque de Cerisy, 23 juillet-2 août 1980 (ed.)	1981	ISBN 2-7186-0207-4	with Jean-Luc Nancy	see Retreating the Political below for translations of their contributions
Rejouer le politique (ed.)	1981	ISBN	with Jean-Luc Nancy	see Retreating the Political below for translations of their contributions
La retrait du politique (ed.)	1983	ISBN	with Jean-Luc Nancy	see Retreating the Political below for translations of their contributions
Retrait de l’artiste en deux personnes	1985	ISBN 2-904546-04-9
L'Imitation des modernes: Typographies 2	1986	ISBN 2-08-226011-9		Typography: Mimesis, Philosophy, Politics	1989 (Harvard), 1998 (Stanford)	ISBN 0-8047-3282-5	ed. Christopher Fynsk*
La Poésie comme expérience	1986	ISBN 2-267-00438-0		Poetry as Experience	1999	ISBN 0-8047-3427-5	trans. Andrea Tarnowski
La Fiction du politique: Heidegger, l'art et la politique	1988, revised	ISBN 2-267-00531-X		Heidegger, Art, and Politics: the Fiction of the Political	1990	ISBN 0-631-17155-X	trans. Chris Turner
Sit venia verbo	1988	ISBN 2-267-00565-4	with Michel Deutsch
Musica ficta: figures de Wagner	1991	ISBN 2-267-00863-7		Musica ficta: Figures of Wagner	1994	ISBN 0-8047-2385-0	trans. Felicia McCarren
Le mythe nazi	1991	ISBN 2-87678-078-X	with Jean-Luc Nancy
Pasolini, une improvisation : d’une sainteté	1995	ISBN 2-84103-037-7		"Pasolini, an improvisation: Of a Saintliness"	Umbr(a) 2005	ISBN 0-9666452-8-6	trans. Steven Miller
Retreating the Political	1997	ISBN 0-415-15163-5	with Jean-Luc Nancy, ed. Simon Sparks**
Métaphrasis; suivi de Le théâtre de Hölderlin	1998	ISBN 2-13-049336-X
Phrase	2000	ISBN 2-267-01561-7
Poétique de l'histoire	2002	ISBN 2-7186-0578-2
Heidegger: la politique du poème	2002	ISBN 2-7186-0593-6		Heidegger and the Politics of Poetry	2007	ISBN 0-252-03153-9	trans. Jeff Fort
Agonie terminée, agonie interminable	2004	ISBN 2-7186-0626-6
Le chant des muses: Petite conférence sur la musique	2005	ISBN 2-227-47528-5
L’«allégorie»: Suivi de Un commencement	2006	ISBN 2-7186-0724-6
Préface à la disparition	2009	ISBN 2-267-02033-5
Ecrits Sur l'Art	2009	ISBN 2-84066-282-5

* contents of this book do not correspond exactly to those of the book it otherwise translates

** collects essays from 1979, 1981, and 1983 and others not previously published

== See also ==
- List of thinkers influenced by deconstruction
