= Reiner Schürmann =

Philosopher (1941–1993)

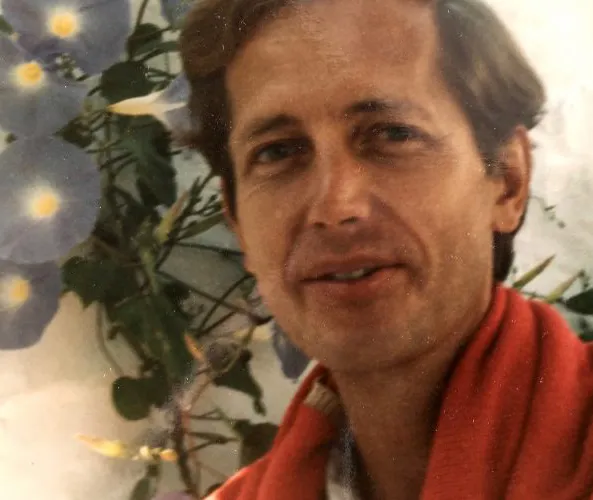
- Born: February 4, 1941; Amsterdam, Netherlands
- Died: August 20, 1993 (aged 52); New York City, US
- Partner: Louis Comtois

Academic background
- Education: University of Sorbonne

Academic work
- Discipline: philosophy
- Institutions: The New School for Social Research
- Notable works: Heidegger on Being and Acting: From Principles to Anarchy

Reiner Schürmann (February 4, 1941 – August 20, 1993) was a German philosopher. He was a professor of philosophy at The New School for Social Research in New York City from 1975 to his death. He wrote all his major published work in French. Deeply influenced by Heidegger, Meister Eckhart, and contemporary continental thought, Schürmann developed a radical critique of metaphysical and political first principles (what he called "anarchy of being and action") culminating in analyses of broken hegemonies, singularity, and non-foundational praxis. In recent years, his work have been increasingly translated and discussed in different countries like Italy or Mexico; in 2025, an anthology remarked that academic interest in Schürmann's philosophical work had grown notably.

== Biography ==
Born in Amsterdam in 1941 of German parents, Reiner Schürmann studied philosophy and theology with the Dominicans of Le Centre d'études du Saulchoir near Paris, between 1962 and 1969, and received a Doctorate in Philosophy from the University of Sorbonne in Paris in 1981.

It was as a Dominican priest that he first came to the United States in 1971, teaching first at The Catholic University of America in Washington, D.C., then at Duquesne University in Pittsburgh. In 1975, he left the priesthood and began teaching philosophy at the New School for Social Research as a protégé of Hannah Arendt and Hans Jonas.

He died of complications associated with HIV/AIDS on August 20, 1993, in New York City, three years after his partner, Québécois painter Louis Comtois.

== Work ==
One of Schürmann's best-known works is Heidegger on Being and Acting: From Principles to Anarchy (1990 reprint ISBN 0-253-20602-2). In this work, Schürmann reflects on the difference between the findings of Heidegger the thinker and the beliefs of Heidegger the man, and incidentally shows Heidegger's intellectual honesty in following these thoughts in spite of his personal upbringing and beliefs.

In his only literary work, Les Origines, which was awarded the Prix Broquette-Gonin by the Académie Française in 1977, he provides an autobiographical account of a pilgrimage of errancy, a search for redemption from the inauthentic thrownness of a past filled with memories of guilt and despair, of being born German during World War II, "too late to see the war, too early to forget it."

In 1996, the French philosopher Gérard Granel published posthumously the French original of Schürmann's monumental work Broken Hegemonies ("Des Hégémonies brisées", Mauvezin, T.E.R., 1996).

=== Published works ===
- Maître Eckhart et la joie errante, 1972 ("Master Eckhart and the Wandering Joy"; translated into English as Meister Eckhart: Mystic and philosopher, 1978)
- Les Origines ("Origins", 1977)
- Le Principe d'anarchie: Heidegger et la question de l'agir, 1982; tr. From Principles to Anarchy: Heidegger on Being and Acting (1987)
- Des Hégémonies brisées, posthumous publication, 1996; tr. Broken Hegemonies (2003).
- Meister Eckhart: German mystic by Father Reiner Schürmann, O.P. on Britannica

=== Reiner Schürmann Selected Writings and Lecture Notes ===
In the late 2010s, the Diaphanes editions started to reedit some of Schürmann's writings and issue new previously unpublished of his works, such as:

- Tomorrow the Manifold: Essays on Foucault, Anarchy, and the Singularization to Come, ed. Malte F. Rauch and Nicolas Schneider. Zurich: Diaphanes, 2019.
- Neo-Aristotelianism and the Medieval Renaissance: On Aquinas, Ockham, and Eckhart, ed. Ian Alexander Moore. Zurich: Diaphanes, 2020.
- The Philosophy of Nietzsche, ed. Francesco Guercio. Zurich: Diaphanes, 2020.
- Reading Marx: On Transcendental Materialism, ed. Malte Fabian Rauch and Nicolas Schneider. Zurich: Diaphanes, 2021.
- Modern Philosophies of the Will, ed. Kieran Aarons and Francesco Guercio. Zurich: Diaphanes, 2022.
- Ways of Releasement: Writings on God, Eckhart, and Zen, ed. Francesco Guercio and Ian Alexander Moore. Zurich: Diaphanes, 2023.
- The Place of the Symbolic: Essays on Art and Politics, ed. Kieran Aarons and Nicolas Schneider. Zurich: Diaphanes, 2024.
