= Jean-Luc Nancy =

French philosopher (1940–2021)

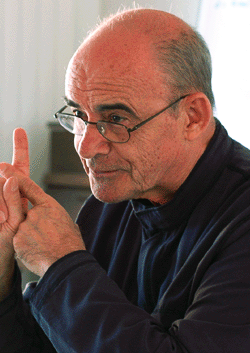
- Nancy in 2006 at the European Graduate School
- Born: 26 July 1940; Caudéran, Gironde, France
- Died: 23 August 2021 (aged 81); Strasbourg, France

Education
- Education: University of Paris; Université de Toulouse-Le-Mirail
- Doctoral advisor: Paul Ricœur
- Other advisor: Jacques Derrida

Philosophical work
- Era: 20th-century philosophy
- Region: Western philosophy
- School: Continental philosophy Deconstruction
- Institutions: University of Strasbourg; European Graduate School
- Main interests: Literary criticism Ontology; Political philosophy Philosophy of technology
- Notable ideas: The literary Absolute, existence as ontological responsibility, ontodicy, sense of the world, inoperative community, non-subjective freedom, anastasis, dis-enclosure, meontology, being singular plural, being-with, sexistence

Jean-Luc Nancy (/nɑːnˈsiː/ nahn-SEE; French: [ʒɑ̃lyk nɑ̃si]; 26 July 1940 – 23 August 2021) was a French philosopher. Nancy's first book, published in 1973, was Le titre de la lettre (The Title of the Letter, 1992), a reading of the work of French psychoanalyst Jacques Lacan, written in collaboration with Philippe Lacoue-Labarthe. Nancy is the author of works on many thinkers, including La remarque spéculative in 1973 (The Speculative Remark, 2001) on Georg Wilhelm Friedrich Hegel, Le Discours de la syncope (1976) and L'Impératif catégorique (1983) on Immanuel Kant, Ego sum (1979) on René Descartes, and Le Partage des voix (1982) on Martin Heidegger.

In addition to Le titre de la lettre, Nancy collaborated with Lacoue-Labarthe on several other books and articles. Nancy is credited with helping to reopen the question of the ground of community and politics with his 1985 work La communauté désoeuvrée (The Inoperative Community), following Blanchot's The Unavowable Community (1983) and Agamben responded to both with The Coming Community (1990). One of the very few monographs that Jacques Derrida ever wrote on a contemporary philosopher is On Touching, Jean-Luc Nancy.

== Biography ==
Jean-Luc Nancy graduated in philosophy in 1962 from the University of Paris. He taught for a short while in Colmar before becoming an assistant at the Strasbourg Institut de Philosophie in 1968. In 1973, he received his doctorate with a dissertation on Kant under the supervision of Paul Ricœur. Nancy was then promoted to Maître de conférences (associate professor) at the Université des Sciences Humaines de Strasbourg. In the 1970s and 1980s, Nancy was a guest professor at universities all over the world, from the University of California to the Freie Universität in Berlin. He has been invited as a cultural delegate of the French Ministry of External Affairs to speak in Eastern Europe, Britain and the United States. In 1987, Nancy became a Docteur d'État at the Université de Toulouse-Le-Mirail for a thesis on freedom in Heidegger under the supervision of Gérard Granel. The jury was composed of Jean-François Lyotard and Jacques Derrida. It was published as L'expérience de la liberté (1988).

In the late 1980s and early 1990s, Nancy suffered serious medical problems. He underwent a heart transplant and his recovery was made more difficult by a long-term cancer diagnosis. He stopped teaching and participating in almost all of the committees with which he was engaged, but continued to write. Many of his best-known texts were published during this time. An account of his experience, L'intrus (The Intruder), was published in 2000. Nancy was a professor at the University of Strasbourg. Nancy was also Wilhelm Friedrich Hegel Chair and Professor of Philosophy at The European Graduate School.

Filmmaker Claire Denis has made at least two movies inspired by Jean-Luc Nancy and his works. Many other artists have worked with Nancy as well, such as Simon Hantaï, Soun-gui Kim and Phillip Warnell. Nancy has written about the filmmaker Abbas Kiarostami and featured prominently in the film The Ister.

Nancy died on 23 August 2021 at the age of 81.

== Major works ==
=== Les Fins de l'homme ===
In 1980, Nancy and Lacoue-Labarthe organized a conference at Centre culturel international de Cerisy-la-Salle on Derrida and politics entitled "Les Fins de l'homme" ("The Ends of Man"). The conference solidified Derrida's place at the forefront of contemporary philosophy, and was a place to begin an in-depth conversation between philosophy and contemporary politics. Further to their desire to rethink the political, Nancy and Lacoue-Labarthe set up in the same year the Centre de Recherches Philosophiques sur la Politique (Centre for Philosophical Research on the Political). The centre was dedicated to pursuing philosophical rather than empirical approaches to political questions, and supported such speakers as Claude Lefort and Jean-François Lyotard. By 1984, however, Nancy and Lacoue-Labarthe were dissatisfied with the direction work at the centre was taking, and it was closed down.

During that period Lacoue-Labarthe and Nancy produced several important papers, together and separately. Some of these texts appear in Les Fins de l'homme à partir du travail de Jacques Derrida: colloque de Cerisy, 23 juillet-2 août 1980 (1981), Rejouer le politique (1981), La retrait du politique (1983), and Le mythe nazi (1991, revised edition; originally published as Les méchanismes du fascisme, 1981). Many of these texts are gathered in translation in Retreating the Political (1997).

=== La Communauté désœuvrée ===
Nancy's first book on the question of community, La Communauté désœuvrée (The Inoperative Community, 1986), is perhaps his best-known work. This text is an introduction to some of the main philosophical themes Nancy continued to work with. Nancy traces the influence of the notion of community to concepts of experience, discourse, and the individual, and argues that it has dominated modern thought. Discarding popular notions, Nancy redefines community, asking what can it be if it is reduced neither to a collection of separate individuals, nor to a hypostasized communal substance, e.g., fascism. He writes that our attempt to design society according to pre-planned definitions frequently leads to social violence and political terror, posing the social and political question of how to proceed with the development of society with this knowledge in mind. La Communauté désœuvrée means that community is not the result of a production, be it social, economic or even political (nationalist) production; it is not une œuvre, a "work of art" ("œuvre d'art", but "art" is here understood in the sense of "artifice").

"The community that becomes a single thing (body, mind, fatherland, Leader...) ...necessarily loses the in of being-in-common. Or, it loses the with or the together that defines it. It yields its being-together to a being of togetherness. The truth of community, on the contrary, resides in the retreat of such a being." (Preface, xxxix).

=== L'Expérience de la liberté ===
Nancy's dissertation for his Doctorat d'État looked at the works of Kant, Schelling, Sartre and Heidegger, and concentrated on their treatment of the topic of freedom. It was published in 1988 as L'Expérience de la Liberté (The Experience of Freedom). Since then, Nancy has continued to concentrate on developing a reorientation of Heidegger's work. Nancy treats freedom as a property of the individual or collectivity, and looks for a "non-subjective" freedom which would attempt to think the existential or finite origin for every freedom. Nancy argues that it is necessary to think freedom in its finite being, because to think of it as the property of an infinite subject is to make any finite being a limit of freedom. The existence of the other is the necessary condition of freedom, rather than its limitation.

=== Le sens du monde ===
Nancy addresses the world in its contemporary global configuration in other writings on freedom, justice and sovereignty. In his 1993 book Le sens du monde (The Sense of the World), he asks what we mean by saying that we live in one world, and how our sense of the world is changed by saying that it is situated within the world, rather than above or apart from it. To Nancy, the world, or existence, is our ontological responsibility, which precedes political, judicial and moral responsibility. He describes our being in the world as an exposure to a naked existence, without the possibility of support by a fundamental metaphysical order or cause. Contemporary existence no longer has recourse to a divine framework, as was the case in feudal society where the meaning and course of life was predetermined. The contingency of our naked existence as an ontological question is the main challenge of our existence in contemporary global society.

All of these themes relating to world are taken up again by Nancy in his 2002 book La création du monde ou la mondialisation (The Creation of the World or Globalization), where he makes the distinction between globalization as a deterministic process and mondialisation as an open-ended "world-forming" process. Here, he connects his critique with Marx's critique of political economy, which saw "free labour" as what produces the world. Nancy argues that an authentic "dwelling" in the world must be concerned with the creation of meaning (enjoyment) and not final purposes, closed essences, and exclusive worldviews. The present system of expanding cities and nodes in the planetary techno-scientific network (tied to capitalism) leads to the loss of world, because the world is treated as an object (globe), even though the self-deconstruction of ontotheology increasingly made it the "subject" of its own creation.

=== Être singulier pluriel ===
In his book Être singulier pluriel (Being Singular Plural, 2000), Nancy tackles the question of how we can speak of a plurality of a "we" without making the "we" a singular identity. The premise of the title essay in this book is that there is no being without "being-with," that "I" does not come before "we" (i.e., Dasein does not precede Mitsein) and that there is no existence without co-existence. In an extension from his thoughts on freedom, community, and the sense of the world, he imagines the "being-with" as a mutual exposure to one another that preserves the freedom of the "I", and thus a community that is not subject to an exterior or pre-existent definition.

"There is no meaning if meaning is not shared, and not because there would be an ultimate or first signification that all beings have in common, but because meaning is itself the sharing of Being."

The five essays that follow the title piece continue to develop Nancy's philosophy through discussions of sovereignty, war and technology, ecotechnics, identity, the Gulf War and Sarajevo. Nancy's central concern in these essays remains the "being-with", which he uses to discuss issues of psychoanalysis, politics and multiculturalism, looking at notions of "self" and "other" in current contexts.

== Artistic analysis ==
Nancy has also written for art catalogues and international art journals, especially on contemporary art. He also writes poetry and for the theatre and has earned respect as an influential philosopher of art and culture. In his book Les Muses published in 1994 (The Muses, 1996), he begins with an analysis of Hegel's thesis on the death of art. Among the essays in The Muses is a piece on Caravaggio, originally a lecture given at the Louvre. In this essay, Nancy looks for a different conception of painting where painting is not a representation of the empirical world, but a presentation of the world, of sense, or of existence. Nancy has published books on film and music, as well as texts on the problem of representation, on the statute of literature, on image and violence, and on the work of On Kawara, Charles Baudelaire, and Friedrich Hölderlin.

== Film theory ==
Nancy's text L'intrus formed the basis for French director Claire Denis's film of the same name.

He has written extensively on film, including The Evidence of Film, a short work on Abbas Kiarostami.

Nancy appears in the film The Ister, based on Martin Heidegger's 1942 lectures on Friedrich Hölderlin's poem "Der Ister" (published as Hölderlin's Hymn "The Ister"). The film focuses on the relation of politics, technology and myth.

Nancy has developed three films in conjunction with artist-filmmaker Phillip Warnell. He appears in their 2009 film Outlandish: 'Strange Foreign Bodies', which also features a text he wrote specifically for the project, Étranges Corps Étrangers. Nancy contributed a poem, 'Oh The Animals of Language' to Warnell's 2014 feature-length film 'Ming of Harlem: Twenty One Storeys in the Air'. Warnell and Nancy worked on a new text-film collaboration which was completed in 2017, 'The Flying Proletarian'.

== Bibliography ==
=== Titles in French ===
- La Remarque spéculative (Un bon mot de Hegel). Paris: Galilée, 1973.
- La titre de la lettre. Paris: Galilée, 1973 (with Philippe Lacoue-Labarthe).
- Le Discours de la syncope. I. Logodaedalus. Paris: Flammarion, 1975.
- L'absolu littéraire. Théorie de la littérature du romantisme allemand. Paris: Seuil, 1978 (with Philippe Lacoue-Labarthe).
- Ego sum. Paris: Flammarion, 1979.
- Les Fins de l'homme à partir du travail de Jacques Derrida: colloque de Cerisy, 23 juillet-2 août 1980. 1981 (ed., with Lacoue-Labarthe).
- Rejouer le politique. 1981 (ed., with Lacoue-Labarthe).
- Le partage des voix. Paris: Galilée, 1982.
- La retrait du politique. 1983 (ed., with Lacoue-Labarthe).
- La communauté désoeuvrée. Paris: Christian Bourgois, 1983.
- L'Impératif catégorique. Paris: Flammarion, 1983.
- L'oubli de la philosophie. Paris: Galilée, 1986.
- Des lieux divins. Mauvezin: T.E.R, 1987.
- L'expérience de la liberté. Paris: Galilée, 1988.
- Une Pensée finie. Paris: Galilée, 1990.
- Le poids d'une pensée. Québec: Le griffon d'argile, 1991.
- Le mythe nazi. La tour d'Aigues: L'Aube, 1991 (with Philippe Lacoue-Labarthe, revised edition; originally published as Les méchanismes du fascisme, 1981).
- La comparution (politique à venir). Paris: Bourgois, 1991 (with Jean-Chrisophe Bailly).
- Corpus. Paris: Métailié, 1992.
- Le sens du monde. Paris: Galilée, 1993.
- Les Muses. Paris: Galilée, 1994.
- Être singulier pluriel. Paris: Galilée, 1996.
- Hegel. L'inquiétude du négatif. Paris: Hachette, 1997.
- L'Intrus. Paris: Galilée, 2000.
- Le regard du portrait. Paris: Galilée, 2000.
- Conloquium, in Roberto Esposito, Communitas. trad. de Nadine Le Lirzin, Paris: PUF, 2000.
- La pensée dérobée. Paris: Galilée, 2001.
- The evidence of film. Bruxelles: Yves Gevaert, 2001.
- La création du monde ou la mondialisation. Paris: Galilée, 2002.
- À l’écoute. Paris: Galilée, 2002.
- Nus sommes. La peau des images. Paris: Klincksieck, 2003 (with Federico Ferrari).
- Noli me tangere. Paris: Bayard, 2003.
- "L'extension de l'âme". Metz: Le Portique, 2003.
- "L'il y a' du rapport sexuel". Paris: Galilée, 2003.
- La déclosion (Déconstruction du Christianisme 1). Paris: Galilée, 2005.
- Sur le commerce des pensées: Du livre et de la librairie. Paris: Galilée, 2005.
- Iconographie de l'auteur. Paris: Galilée, 2005 (with Federico Ferrari).
- Tombe de sommeil. Paris: Galilée, 2007.
- Juste impossible. Paris: Bayard, 2007.
- À plus d'un titre: Jacques Derrida. Paris: Galilée, 2007.
- Vérité de la democratie. Paris: Galilée, 2008.
- Le poids d'une pensée, l'approche. Strasbourg: La Phocide, 2008.
- Je t'aime, un peu, beaucoup, passionnément.... Paris: Bayard Centurion, 2008.
- Démocratie, dans quel état ?, with Giorgio Agamben, Alain Badiou, Daniel Bensaïd, Wendy Brown, Jacques Rancière, Kristin Ross and Slavoj Žižek, La Fabrique, 2009.
- L'Adoration, Paris, Galilée, 2010.
- Atlan : les détrempes, Paris, Hazan, 2010.
- À Vengeance ? de Robert Antelme, in Robert Antelme, Vengeance ?. Hermann, 2010.
- La Ville au loin. Strasbourg: La Phocide, 2011.
- Maurice Blanchot, passion politique. Paris: Galilée, 2011.
- Politique et au-delà. Interview with Philipp Armstrong and Jason E. Smith, Paris: Galilée, 2011.
- Dans quels mondes vivons-nous?, with Aurélien Barrau, Paris: Galilée, 2011.
- L’Équivalence des catastrophes (Après Fukushima), Paris: Galilée, 2012.
- La Possibilité d'un monde, Paris: Les petits platons, 2013.
- Jamais le mot "créateur"..., with Simon Hantaï, Paris, Galilée, 2013.
- L’Autre Portrait, Paris, Galilée, 2013.
- Être singulier pluriel, nouvelle édition augmentée, Paris, Galilée, 2013.
- Le Philosophe boiteux, Le Havre, Franciscopolis/Presses du réel, 2014.
- La Jouissance. Questions de caractère, with Adèle Van Reeth, Paris, Plon, 2014.
- La Communauté désavouée, Paris, Galilée, 2014.
- Inventions à deux voix. Entretiens, with Danielle Cohen-Levinas, Paris, Éditions du Félin, 2015.
- Proprement dit : Entretien sur le mythe, with Mathilde Girard, Paris, Lignes, 2015.
- Journal des Phéniciennes, Paris, Christian Bourgois, 2015.
- Banalité de Heidegger, Paris, Galilée, 2015.
- Demande : Littérature et philosophie, Paris, Galilée, 2015.
- Entretien sur le christianisme (Paris, 2008), with Bernard Stiegler and Alain Jugnon, in: Bernard Stiegler, Dans la disruption : Comment ne pas devenir fou ?, Paris, Les Liens qui Libèrent, 2016.
- Que faire ?, Paris, Galilée, 2016.
- Signaux sensibles, entretien à propos des arts, with Jérôme Lèbre, Paris, Bayard, 2017.
- La Tradition allemande dans la philosophie, with Alain Badiou, Paris, Éditions Lignes, 2017.
- Sexistence, Paris, Galilée, 2017.
- Exclu le Juif en nous, Paris, Galilée, 2018.
- Hegel, l'inquiétude du négatif, Paris, Galilée, 2018.
- Derrida, suppléments, Paris, Galilée, 2019.
- La peau fragile du monde, Paris, Galilée, 2020.
- Mascarons de Macron, Paris, Galilée, 2021.
- Cruor, Paris, Galilée, 2021.

=== English translations ===
- The Literary Absolute: The Theory of Literature in German Romanticism. With Philippe Lacoue-Labarthe. Albany: SUNY Press, 1988.
- The Inoperative Community. Minneapolis: University of Minnesota Press, 1991.
- The Title of the Letter: A Reading of Lacan. With Philippe Lacoue-Labarthe. Albany: SUNY Press, 1992.
- The Birth to Presence. Stanford: Stanford University Press, 1993.
- The Experience of Freedom. Stanford: Stanford University Press, 1993.
- The Muses. Stanford: Stanford University Press, 1996.
- The Gravity of Thought. New Jersey: Humanities Press, 1997.
- Retreating the Political. With Philippe Lacoue-Labarthe; edited by Simon Sparks. London: Routledge, 1997.
- The Sense of the World. Minneapolis: University of Minnesota Press, 1998.
- Being Singular Plural. Stanford: Stanford University Press, 2000.
- The Speculative Remark: One of Hegel's Bons Mots. Stanford: Stanford University Press, 2001.
- Hegel: The Restlessness of the Negative. Minneapolis: University of Minnesota Press, 2002.
- A Finite Thinking. Stanford: Stanford University Press, 2003
- The Ground of the Image. New York: Fordham University Press, 2005.
- Multiple Arts (The Muses II). Stanford: Stanford University Press, 2006.
- The Creation of the World or Globalization. Albany: SUNY Press, 2007.
- Listening. New York: Fordham University Press, 2007.
- The Discourse of the Syncope: Logodaedalus. Stanford: Stanford University Press, 2007.
- Dis-Enclosure: The Deconstruction of Christianity. New York: Fordham University Press, 2008.
- Philosophical Chronicles (Perspectives in Continental Philosophy). New York: Fordham University Press, 2008.
- Noli Me Tangere: On the Raising of the Body. New York: Fordham University Press, 2008.
- Corpus. New York: Fordham University Press, 2008.
- On the Commerce of Thinking: On Books and Bookstores. New York: Fordham University Press, 2009.
- The Fall of Sleep. New York: Fordham University Press, 2009.
- The Truth of Democracy. New York: Fordham University Press, 2010.
- God, Justice, Love, Beauty: Four Little Dialogues. New York: Fordham University Press, 2011.
- In Place of Utopia. In Existential Utopia: New Perspectives on Utopian Thought. New York & London: Continuum, 2012.
- Adoration: The Deconstruction of Christianity II. New York: Fordham University Press, 2012.
- The Pleasure in Drawing. New York: Fordham University Press, 2013.
- Being Nude. The Skin of Images. With Federico Ferrari; New York: Fordham University Press, 2014.
- The Disavowed Community. New York: Fordham University Press, 2016.
- Foreword of Gandhi and Philosophy: On Theological Anti-politics, London: Bloomsbury Academic, 2018.
- Dies Irae. London: University of Westminster Press, 2019.
- "A Passing." New York: Contra Mundum Press, 2020. Introduction to Marguerite Duras, The Darkroom.
- Sexistence. New York: Fordham University Press, 2021.
- Jean-Luc Nancy and Shaj Mohan, On Bernard Stiegler: Philosopher of Friendship, Bloomsbury Philosophy, UK, 2024.

== See also ==
- List of thinkers influenced by deconstruction
