= Gérard Granel =

French philosopher

Gérard Granel (French: [gʁanɛl]; 1930 – 10 November 2000) was a French philosopher and translator.

== Life and work ==
Born in Paris, Granel attended the lycée Louis-le-Grand and the courses of Michel Alexandre, Jean Hyppolite and, later, of Louis Althusser and Jean Beaufret. He taught in Bordeaux, Toulouse, and Aix, before being appointed professor of philosophy at the Université de Toulouse-Le-Mirail, a position he held from 1972 until his death.

Granel translated numerous philosophical texts into French, including work by Martin Heidegger, Edmund Husserl, David Hume, Giambattista Vico, and Ludwig Wittgenstein.

Granel was an important influence on a number of French philosophers, including Jacques Derrida, Jean-Luc Nancy and Bernard Stiegler.

Granel died in Cornebarrieu.

== Works ==
=== In French ===
- Le Sens du temps et de la perception chez E. Husserl (Paris: Gallimard, 1968).
- L’Équivoque ontologique de la pensée kantienne (Paris: Gallimard, 1970; second edition : Mauvezin: T.E.R, 2009).
- Traditionis traditio (Paris: Gallimard, 1972).
- De l’Université (Mauvezin: Éditions TER, 1982).
- Cartesiana (with Bernard Bouttes) (Mauvezin: T.E.R, 1983).
- Écrits logiques et politiques (Paris: Galilée, 1990).
- Études (Paris: Galilée, 1995).
- Apolis (Mauvezin: T.E.R, 2009).

=== In English ===
- "Who Comes after the Subject?" in Eduardo Cadava, Peter Connor & Jean-Luc Nancy (eds.), Who Comes after the Subject? (New York & London: Routledge, 1991), pp. 148–56.
- "Untameable singularity (some remarks on [ Reiner Schürmann's ] Broken Hegemonies)," Graduate Faculty Philosophy Journal 19/2–20/1 (1997), pp. 215–28.

=== In German ===
- Die totale Produktion. Technik, Kapital und die Logik der Unendlichkeit, hrsg. u. eingeleitet v. Erich Hörl, aus dem Französischen von Laura Strack (Wien & Berlin: Turia+Kant, 2020).

== References and further reading ==
=== English ===
Books

- Alexandru Polgár, The Difference between Heidegger's Concept of Market and That of Granel. See: http://www.gerardgranel.com/txt_pdf/Alexandru_Polgar_Difference_Int+chap%20I.pdf. Published in Romanian as Diferența dintre conceptul de producție al lui Heidegger și cel al lui Granel (Cluj: IDEA Design + Print, 2013). See: http://www.idea.ro/editura/ro/diferena-dintre-conceptul-de-pia-al-lui-heidegger-i-cel-al-lui-granel-d131.html.

Articles

- Christopher Fynsk, "But Suppose We Were To Take 'The Rectoral Address' Seriously…On Gérard Granel's De l'université," Graduate Faculty Philosophy Journal 14/2 (1991), pp. 335–362.
- Christopher Fynsk, "A Politics of Thought: Gérard Granel's De l'université," in The Claim of Language: A Case for the Humanities (Minneapolis: University of Minnesota Press, 2004).
- Douglas Steward, "Gérard Granel's Other University Now". See: http://www.gerardgranel.com/txt_pdf/about_steward.pdf.

=== French ===
Books

- Jean-Luc Nancy, Élisabeth Rigal (eds.), Granel - l'éclat, le combat, l'ouvert (Paris: Belin, 2001).
- Gérard Granel ou la rigoeur du dénuement (coll.) (Mauvezin: Éditions Trans-Europ-Repress, 2012).
- L'Archi-politique de Gérard Granel (coll.) (Mauvezin: Éditions Trans-Europ-Repress, 2013).

=== German ===
Articles

- Erich Hörl, "Die Problematik Granels", in Gérard Granel, Die totale Produktion. Technik, Kapital und die Logik der Unendlichkeit, hrsg. u. eingeleitet v. Erich Hörl, aus dem Französischen v. Laura Strack (Wien & Berlin: Turia+Kant, 2020), 7–37.
