= François Fédier =

French philosopher and translator (1935–2021)

- Born: 19 December 1935; Paris, France
- Died: 28 April 2021 (aged 85); Paris, France
- Occupations: Philosopher; Translator

François Fédier (19 December 1935 – 28 April 2021) was a French philosopher and translator.

== Biography ==
Fédier was a student of Jean Beaufret in the 1950s and began translating the works of Martin Heidegger in 1958. Some controversies surrounded his translations of Heidegger. He became a teacher at the Lycée Pasteur in Neuilly-sur-Seine until his retirement in 2001.

He taught philosophers Hadrien France-Lanord and Fabrice Midal. Fédier also taught a new generation of philosophers, such as Hadrien France-Lanord, Philippe Arjakovsky and Fabrice Midal, who was introduced to the field of oriental meditation by the Chilean biologist Francisco Varela. He directed the translation, a task entrusted to him by the author himself, of the Integral Edition (Gesamtausgabe - G.A.) of Heidegger at the Gallimard Publishing House in Paris. In 2017, the Pontificia Universitas Lateranensis (Pontifical Lateran University) awarded him an honorary medal for directing the translation of the Complete Edition of Heidegger into French. The task was entrusted to him by Heidegger himself. On November 29, 2018, the first two volumes of his Notebooks were published by Gallimard Publishing House. The first (1931-1938) was translated by Fédier and the second by Pascal David.

On the occasion of the publication of Voz del amigo y otros ensayos en torno a Heidegger by Editorial de la Universidad Diego Portales (2017), Juan Rodríguez M. did an email interview with him in which Fédier tells in broad strokes his relationship with Heidegger. Rodriguez says: In 1958, the philosopher visited the University of Aix-en-Provence, in the south of France, to give a lecture on "Hegel and the Greeks". Among the audience was Fédier: "So I saw the lecturer first. In this case, I hardly have difficulty finding the words to say the impression I had," he says. And then she turns to some words of Hannah Arendt, included in one of the texts of Voice of the Friend, and taken from a letter she wrote to her husband: in it, the political theorist, says that Heidegger, her former teacher, "is in magnificent form", that he seems to have "found his Medium". Arendt saw in him "a true freedom": "He speaks calmly, without the slightest pathos; to say it all: in a state of grace." "There is no better way to say the impression I felt when I saw Heidegger in that spring of 1958," Fédier confirms. He was twenty-two years old, Heidegger was in his sixty-ninth year. "Subsequently, I did not stop seeing him until 1974, two years before his death. So I was able to observe this man for almost twenty years."

The interview was published on August 27, 2017 on page E-6 of the cultural supplement Artes y Letras of the Santiago, Chile, newspaper El Mercurio.

The interview by Juan Rodríguez M. continues in these terms: "Kindness is accompanied by simplicity -adds Fédier-. Martin Heidegger was very easy to live with (as we say in French). For example: I took him many times by car from Fribourg, where he lived, to Provence; it was a trip that lasted three days. In the memory of this trip there is not a single moment of discomfort or tension: Heidegger was very attentive to the landscapes we were passing through." "It must be said that Provence is a wonderful landscape. We strolled many times through Cézanne's landscapes. The happy, but also very restrained, almost austere atmosphere of the landscape seemed to suit him entirely."

There are more memories. For example, one that "has the advantage of covering several years. From 1958 to 1973 I saw Heidegger grow old. Today I am the same age he was at the time of the seminars at Le Thor [a course he gave in that French town in 1969]. And I can realize my naivety at the time: year by year he was getting older, and as I watched him grow older, I told myself that it must be easy to grow old, as long as you are healthy," says Fédier. "Today, I know that it's not easy to grow old like him! I realize how much attention you have to pay, how much work you have to do, at every moment, not to let yourself be invaded, paralyzed, overshadowed by age. Heidegger kept to the end of his life the same equanimity, the same attention for others, the same desire to always respond to expectations. In short: contrary to what many misinformed people think, his whole life breathes like his thought. In that sense he is also an example. Fédier visited Heidegger regularly. He would go to his home, both to the "little house" he had in Freiburg, Germany, and to the cottage he had in Todtnauberg, high in the Black Forest, "which was even smaller. These two dwellings each have their own particular appearance. But what is striking above all is the absence of ostentatious luxury. So to speak: there was a real comfort, obtained with the simplest and most immediately available means." He also got to know the house where Heidegger was born, in the upper Danube valley, in Meßkirch.

Those visits had to do with translation issues. "But, quickly, the pleasure of meeting him became more central; and so the habit was created (as soon as the occasion arose) of hopping over to his home."

Incidentally, Voz del amigo - the author's first book published in Spanish - became known in Spain and Hispanic America.

Pascal David indicates that Fédier worked on the elaboration of new ways to translate and rigorously interpret the thought of Heidegger, whom he knew personally; he also trained numerous translators in the experience of translating, including Pascal David himself. His work, he added, never ceased to involve the highest demands with regard to translations of Heidegger, which entailed the fact that he never yielded to the facilities of a conventional, academic translation. He left aside the elusive stereotyped language (the "langue de bois") in order, with all the rigor proper to phenomenology, to make seen and understood that which he poured from German into French.

François Fédier died in Paris on 28 April 2021. In the brief note devoted to him in the Dictionnaire Martin Heidegger (Cerf, 2013), co-edited by him, translator and philosopher Pascal David concludes: "If there is indeed, in the positive sense of the term, what we call a 'reception' of Heidegger in France, he is not just its axis. He is its soul". Volume 91 of the complete edition of Heidegger's works, published in 2022, is dedicated to him.

== Publications ==
- Interprétations (1985)
- Heidegger, Anatomie d'un scandale (1988)
- Regarder voir (1995)
- Soixante-deux photographies de Martin Heidegger (1999)
- L'Art : deux cours, une conférence, une dissertation (2000)
- La Raison; Note sur la norme; Pour commencer à lire le "Phèdre" de Platon (2001)
- Leibniz : deux cours : "Principes de la nature et de la grâce fondés en raison", "Monadologie" (2002)
- La Métaphysique, la finalité, le bonheur, le modèle (2003)
- Martin Heidegger : le temps, le monde (2005)
- L'Art en liberté : Aristote, Baudelaire, Proust, Flaubert, Cézanne, Kant, Matisse, Heidegger (2006)
- Voix de l'ami (2007)
- Entendre Heidegger et autres exercices d'écoute (2008)
- L'Imaginaire (2009)
- Le Ménon. Quatre cours, cinquante et une explications de texte (2011)
- La Métaphysique : cours de philosophie (2012)
- L'Humanisme en question : pour aborder la lecture de la 'Lettre sur l'humanisme' de Martin Heidegger (2012)
- Tenir / Entretenir / S'Entretenir (2019)
- Lire Heidegger sans délirer (Pour une éthique de l'interprétation) (2019)
