= Richard Wolin =

American historian (born 1952)

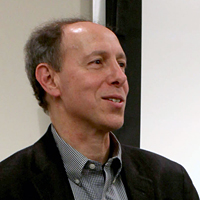
- Wolin during an event at the CUNY Graduate Center
- Born: 1952 (age 73–74); Great Lakes, Illinois, U.S.
- Education: Reed College (BA); York University, Toronto (MA, PhD)
- Known for: Criticism of left fascism
- Scientific career
- Fields: Intellectual history, political philosophy, cultural theory
- Workplaces: CUNY Graduate Center
- Doctoral advisor: Christian Lenhardt
- Website: gc.cuny.edu

Richard Wolin (/ˈwoʊlɪn/; born 1952) is an American intellectual historian specialising in 20th-century European philosophy, particularly German philosopher Martin Heidegger and the group of thinkers known collectively as the Frankfurt School.

== Life ==
Wolin was born at the United States Navy's Naval Station Great Lakes near North Chicago in Lake County, Illinois as a son of Merle Wolin. In his senior year of high school, he attended the trial of the Chicago Seven, which he later recalled as a formative event.

Wolin earned a bachelor of arts from Reed College in 1974, where he helped circulate the writings of the Situationist International, graduating with a senior thesis on György Lukács's History and Class Consciousness. He received both his master of arts and doctor of philosophy degrees from York University, Toronto. He defended his PhD dissertation on Walter Benjamin, written under the supervision of Christian Lenhardt, in 1980.

He then returned to the United States and participated in Jürgen Habermas's lectures at the University of California, Berkeley, published in 1981 as The Theory of Communicative Action. He met Habermas and later acknowledged that the lectures formed an "intellectual turning point" in persuading him away from Theodor W. Adorno's critique of late capitalism as a "totally administered world" and towards a renewed appreciation of reason. Wolin's fresh commitment to defending "the valuable potentials for reform, contestation, and critique residing in existing democratic societies" led him to re-examine the link between Martin Heidegger (as a prominent critic of the alienation characteristic of capitalist modernity) and Nazism.

Wolin taught at Reed College from 1982 to 1984, and at Rice University in Houston from 1984 to 2000. Around 1991, he was an Alexander von Humboldt Fellow in the Department of Philosophy at Goethe University Frankfurt, with Jürgen Habermas as his host. After the publication of his edited volume The Heidegger Controversy, he was embroiled in a public dispute with Jacques Derrida, who threatened to sue Wolin's publisher Columbia University Press over the inclusion of an interview with himself that he considered mistranslated and abused; the dispute reached a high point with an exchange between Wolin and Derrida in The New York Review of Books.

In 2000, Wolin was appointed Distinguished Professor of History and Political Science at the City University of New York Graduate Center. He dedicated his 2001 book Heidegger's Children to Jürgen Habermas, who in turn devoted a lecture at the CUNY Graduate Center in November of the same year to it.

He has been a regular contributor to The New Republic and Dissent. He also wrote for Les Temps modernes and the Houston Chronicle during the 1980s.

== Works ==
=== Books ===
- Walter Benjamin: An Aesthetic of Redemption (1982)
- The Politics of Being: The Political Thought of Martin Heidegger (1990)
- The Heidegger Controversy: A Critical Reader, editor (1991)
- The Terms of Cultural Criticism: The Frankfurt School, Existentialism, Poststructuralism (1992)
- Karl Löwith, Martin Heidegger and European Nihilism, editor (1995)
- Labyrinths: Explorations in the Critical History of Ideas (1995)
- Heidegger's Children: Hannah Arendt, Karl Löwith, Hans Jonas, and Herbert Marcuse (2001)
- The Seduction of Unreason: The Intellectual Romance with Fascism: From Nietzsche to Postmodernism (2004)
- Herbert Marcuse, Heideggerian Marxism, co-editor with John Abromeit (2005)
- The Frankfurt School Revisited: And Other Essays on Politics and Society (2006)
- The Wind from the East: French Intellectuals, the Cultural Revolution, and the Legacy of the 1960s (2010)
- Heidegger in Ruins: Between Philosophy and Ideology (2022)

=== Selected articles ===
- "Benjamin's Materialist Theory of Experience", Theory and Society 11.1 (1982): 17–42, JSTOR 657284
- "The De-Aestheticization of Art: On Adorno's Aesthetische Theorie", Telos 41 (1979): 105–127, doi:10.3817/0979041105
- "An Aesthetic of Redemption: Benjamin's Path to Trauerspiel", Telos 43 (1980): 61–90, doi:10.3817/0380043061
- "Modernism vs. Postmodernism", Telos 62 (1984): 9–29, doi:10.3817/1284062009
- "Communism and the Avant-Garde", Thesis Eleven 12.1 (1985): 81–93, doi:10.1177/072551368501200106
- "Merleau-Ponty and the Birth of Weberian Marxism", Praxis International 5.2 (1985): 115–130
- "Foucault's Aesthetic Decisionism", Telos 67 (1986): 71–86, doi:10.3817/0386067071
- "The French Heidegger Debate", New German Critique 45 (1988): 135–161, JSTOR 488100
- "Utopia, Mimesis, and Reconciliation: A Redemptive Critique of Adorno's Aesthetic Theory", Representations 32 (1990): 33–49, JSTOR 2928794
- "Carl Schmitt, Political Existentialism, and the Total State", Theory and Society 19.4 (1990): 389–416, JSTOR 657796
- "Carl Schmitt: The Conservative Revolutionary Habitus and the Aesthetics of Horror", Political Theory 20.3 (1992): 424–447, JSTOR 192186
- "Left Fascism: Georges Bataille and the German Ideology", Constellations, 2.3 (1996): 397–428, doi:10.1111/j.1467-8675.1996.tb00037.x
- "September 11 and the Self-Castigating Left", South Central Review 19.2/3 (2002): 39–49, JSTOR 3189864
- "The Idea of Cosmopolitanism: From Kant to the Iraq War and Beyond", Ethics & Global Politics 3.2 (2010): 143–153
- "Paul Ricoeur as Another: How a Great Philosopher Wrestled With His Younger Self", The Chronicle of Higher Education, October 14, 2005
- "“The Leprosy of the Soul in Our Time”: On the European Origins of the “Great Replacement” Theory", Los Angeles Review of Books, August 4, 2022
- "Heidegger and Race", Patterns of Prejudice 56.1 (2022): 7–39, doi:10.1080/0031322X.2022.2077926
- "From the "Socialism of Fools" to the "Jihadism of Fools": The Lessons of October 7", Antisemitism Studies 8.2 (2024): 345–351, doi:10.2979/ast.00030
