= Victor Farías =

Chilean historian (born 1940)

Víctor Ernesto Farías Soto (born 4 May 1940) is a Chilean historian. Farías is best known for his controversial book Heidegger and Nazism (1987).

== Education ==
Farías was born in Santiago in 1940. He graduated from the Catholic University of Chile in 1961 and continued his studies in Freiburg, Germany, where he obtained a doctorate in Philosophy. During his stay in Germany, Farías studied under such German thinkers as Martin Heidegger, Rainer Marten, and Eugen Fink. Farías returned to Chile in 1971 but fled back to Germany after the 1973 coup which deposed President Allende. Farías became an investigator and professor in the Free University of Berlin, where he worked until 2006.

== Heidegger and Nazism ==
A one-time student of Heidegger, Farías is best known for his controversial book Heidegger and Nazism (1987), which concluded that Heidegger's philosophy is inherently fascist. His writings are informed by his philosophical education in Germany and a political commitment to the Chilean left. Farías viewpoint in his work is also conscious of Chile's involvement as a place of sanctuary and refuge to Nazis during and after the war. Upon its publication, Heidegger and Nazism obtained international attention and was published in 14 countries.

== Salvador Allende ==
Farías has also garnered considerable controversy because of his allegations against Salvador Allende and the Socialist Party of Chile in general. During this period Farías also published studies on Gabriel García Márquez and Jorge Luis Borges. Farías's publication of Salvador Allende: Antisemitism and Euthanasia (Salvador Allende: Antisemitismo y Eutanasia) made claims that Allende's graduation thesis expressed anti-Semitic views and supported Nazi Germany's plans of sterilization of the mentally unfit. The book, published in Chile, Spain, France, and Brazil, was heavily criticized by Allende's supporters, who published another book claiming to refute Farías' claims and accusations.

In 2006, Farías responded with Salvador Allende: The End of the Myth (Salvador Allende: El fin del mito), which affronted some of his critics, and published new documents claiming Nazi connections to the Chilean Socialist Party in the 1930s. Farías also asserted that, based on documents from the East German archives he uncovered, there were many dealings and associations, political and otherwise, between the Soviet Union and Allende's Chile.

== Bibliography ==
Books in Spanish

- Los manuscritos de Melquíades (1981)
- La estética de la agresión (1984)
- Heidegger y el Nazismo (1987)
- La izquierda chilena (1969–1973) (2001)
- Los Nazis en Chile (2003, two volumes)
- Salvador Allende: Antisemitismo y eutanasia (2005)
- Salvador Allende: El fin de un mito (2006)
- La muerte del camaleón. La Democracia Cristiana Chilena y su Descomposición (2008)
- Los documentos secretos de Salvador Allende. La caja de fondos en La Moneda (2010)
- Heidegger y su herencia. Los neonazis, el neofascismo y el fundamentalismo islámico (2010)
- Ricardo Lagos y el Chile Nuevo (2013)
- Los Nazis en Chile (recast and updated version) (2015)

== See also ==
- Martin Heidegger and Nazism
