= Thomas Sheehan (philosopher) =

American philosopher

- Born: 25 June 1941 (age 85)

Education
- Education: Fordham University (MA, PhD)
- Doctoral advisor: William J. Richardson

Philosophical work
- Era: 20th-century philosophy
- Region: Western philosophy
- School: Continental philosophy Phenomenology; Hermeneutics; Existentialism
- Institutions: Loyola University Chicago
- Main interests: Ontology · Martin Heidegger; Edmund Husserl · first-century Christianity · early Jewish and Christian apocalypticism
- Notable ideas: The First Coming

Thomas Sheehan (/ˈʃiːən/; born 25 June 1941) is an American philosopher. He is a professor emeritus of religious studies at Stanford University and a professor emeritus of philosophy at Loyola University Chicago. His philosophical specialties are in philosophy of religion, twentieth-century European philosophy, and metaphysics. He is the author of The First Coming, a controversial account of Easter.

== Bibliography ==
- Heidegger's Being and Time. A New Reading. New Heidegger Research. London (England) 2022. 304 p.
- Making sense of Heidegger. A paradigm shift. New Heidegger Research. London (England) 2015. XX, 350 p.
- Facticity and Ereignis. Interpreting Heidegger. Critical essays. Ed. Daniel O. Dahlstrom. Cambridge (England) 2011. p. 42–68.
- Martin Heidegger: Logic. The question of truth. Translated by Thomas Sheehan. Studies in Continental Thought. Bloomington (Indianapolis) 2010. XII, 356 p.
- Becoming Heidegger. On the trail of his early occasional writings 1910–1927. Ed. Theodore Kisiel and Thomas Sheehan. Northwestern University Studies in Phenomenology and Existential Philosophy. Evanston (Illinois) 2007. LXXIV, 534 p.
- Dasein. A companion to Heidegger. Ed. Hubert L. Dreyfus, Mark A. Wrathall. Blackwell Companions to Philosophy. 29. Malden (Massachusetts) 2005. p. 193–213.
- General introduction. Husserl and Heidegger. The making and unmaking of a relationship. Edmund Husserl: Collected works. Ed. by Thomas Sheehan and Richard E. Palmer. Vol. 6: Psychological and transcendental phenomenology and the confrontation with Heidegger (1927–1931). The Encyclopædia Britannica article, the Amsterdam lectures, „Phenomenology and Anthropology“ and Husserl's marginal notes in Being and Time and Kant and the problem of metaphysics. Ed. and transl. by Thomas Sheehan and Richard E. Palmer. Dordrecht (Netherlands) 1997. p. 1–32.
- Heidegger’s Lehrjahre. The Collegium Phaenomenologicum. The first ten years. Ed. John C. Sallis, Giuseppina Moneta, and Jacques Taminiaux. Phaenomenologica. Ed. Samuel Ijsseling. 105. Dordrecht (Netherlands) 1988. p. 77–137.
- Karl Rahner. The philosophical foundations. Series in Continental Thought 9. Athens (Ohio) 1987. 320 p.
- The First Coming. How the Kingdom of God became Christianity. 1986.
- Heidegger. The man and the thinker. Ed. Thomas Sheehan. Chicago (Illinois) 1981. XX, 348 p.
- Introduction. Heidegger, the project and the fulfillment. Heidegger. The man and the thinker. Ed. Thomas Sheehan. Chicago (Illinois) 1981. p. VII–XX.
- Getting to the topic. The new edition of Wegmarken. Research in phenomenology. 7. 1977. p. 299–316.
- Heidegger’s early years. Fragments for a philosophical biography. Listening. 12. 1977. p. 3–20. Heidegger. The man and the thinker. Ed. Thomas Sheehan. Chicago (Illinois) 1981. p. 3–19.
- Heidegger, Aristotle, and phenomenology. Philosophy today. 19. 1975. p. 87–94.
- Notes on a lovers' quarrel. Heidegger and Aquinas. Listening. 9. 1974. p. 137–143.
- Heidegger. From beingness to the time-being. Listening. 8. 1973. p. 17–31.
