= Jean Beaufret =

French philosopher (1907–1982)

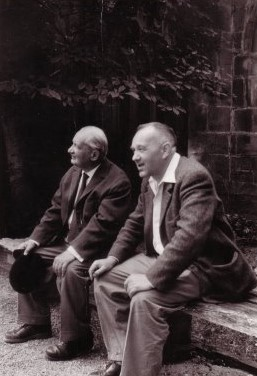
Beaufret and Heidegger in 1955

Jean Beaufret (French: [bofʁɛ]; 22 May 1907, Auzances – 7 August 1982, Paris) was a French philosopher and Germanist tremendously influential in the reception of Martin Heidegger's work in France.

== Life ==
After graduating from the École Normale Supérieure and completing military service, Beaufret passed his agrégation de philosophie in 1933 and undertook a career teaching as a lycée philosophy instructor. His early philosophical interests were in 19th century German philosophy, particularly G. W. F. Hegel, Johann Gottlieb Fichte, and Karl Marx. In the period before the Second World War, he came to know Paul Éluard, Maurice Merleau-Ponty, André Breton, and Paul Valéry. During the war, he was a prisoner and escaped. Then he became a member of the Resistance near Lyon in the "Service Périclès".

== Beaufret and Heidegger ==
In 1946, as Heidegger's continued teaching privileges came into question by the denazification committees, he made Beaufret's acquaintance. Beaufret engaged Heidegger on the development of French existentialism, and Heidegger wrote the "Letter on Humanism" (Brief über den Humanismus) to Beaufret in response. Beaufret took his students to visit Heidegger at Todtnauberg in 1947 following a month-long Franco-German academic exchange at Freiburg im Breisgau, while Baden-Württemberg was still under French occupation. Jean-François Lyotard, one of the group of students on the trip selected to visit Heidegger, wrote about the experience thus:

I remember a sly peasant in his Hütte, dressed in traditional costume, of sententious speech and shifty eye, apparently lacking in shame and anxiety, protected by his knowledge and flattered by his discipline. This picture was enough to prevent me from becoming a "Heideggerian". I take no pride in this. These were fugitive impressions, due no doubt to the prejudices of a young Parisian. I continued to read his work. ("Heidegger and 'the Jews': a Conference in Vienna and Freiburg", p. 137, in Political Writings)

Beaufret remained a close associate of Heidegger's, and it was through Beaufret that Heidegger became aware of Jacques Derrida's work.

He was "a legendary professor of philosophy, having trained generations of students and future professors" (D. Pettigrew and F. Raffoul, French Interpretations of Heidegger, p. 6).

Beaufret is considered the wellspring of "orthodox French Heideggerianism", which was the element of French philosophy that was most dismissive of Heidegger's involvement with National Socialism after the French publication in 1987 of Víctor Farías's Heidegger and Nazism. One reason for Beaufret's dismissal of Farías may have been the latter's revealing that Beaufret had written things that supported the Holocaust denier Robert Faurisson.* In a letter sent to Faurisson, Beaufret is quoted as saying:

"I believe that for my part I have traveled approximately the same path as you and have been considered suspect for having expressed the same doubts [concerning the existence of the gas chambers]. Fortunately for me, this was done orally." Also Jacques Derrida was shocked by Beaufret's antisemitic tirade against Emmanuel Levinas. François Fédier replied that Beaufret actually wrote this letter in 1978, long before Faurisson declared himself as a true negationist, so that he is absolutely not denying the Holocaust (this is demonstrably untrue; Faurisson had published 2 Holocaust-denying articles in 1978 already, and had claimed The Diary of Anne Frank as a forgery the same year). Beaufret wrote the letter only because Faurisson, who was a former student of his, had been violently attacked in the street. Concerning the so-called antisemitic tirade, Jacques Derrida actually didn't hear it: this was reported to him by a friend, Roger Laporte, and Beaufret denied it completely.

== Sources ==
- Jean Beaufret, Dialogue with Heidegger : Greek Philosophy, translated by M. Sinclair, Bloomington : Indiana University Press, 2006.
- L'Endurance de la pensée. Pour saluer Jean Beaufret, Paris : Plon, 1968.
- François Fédier, Heidegger vu de France, Lettre au professeur H. Ott, in Regarder Voir, Paris : Les Belles Lettres/ Archimbaud, 1995. ISBN 2-251-44059-3
- Pierre Jacerme, "The Thoughtful Dialogue Between Martin Heidegger and Jean Beaufret : A New Way of Doing Philosophy", in David Pettigrew and François Raffoul (eds.), French Interpretations of Heidegger : An Exceptional Reception, Albany : SUNY Press, 2006.
- Frédéric de Towarnicki, À la rencontre de Heidegger. Souvenirs d'un messager de la Forêt-Noire, Paris, Gallimard, 1993.
