= Ritter School =

Circle of thinkers around Joachim Ritter

The term Ritter School (German: Ritter-Schule; occasionally also School of Münster) is used in the literature on philosophy or the history of ideas to describe a circle of thinkers who were direct students of the philosopher Joachim Ritter, who worked at the University of Münster, or who were at least influenced to a greater or lesser extent by some of his methodological, systematic or philosophical-historical options.

== Thinkers ==
The following philosophers have been noted in secondary literature to be adherents of the Ritter school:

- Günther Bien (1936–2023)
- Ernst-Wolfgang Böckenförde (1930–2019)
- Wilhelm Goerdt (1921–2014)
- Karlfried Gründer (1928–2011)
- Max Imdahl (1925–1988)
- Martin Kriele (1931–2020)
- Hermann Lübbe (1926)
- Odo Marquard (1928–2015)
- Reinhart Maurer (1935)
- Ludger Oeing-Hanhoff (1923–1986)
- Willi Oelmüller (1930–1999)
- Günter Rohrmoser (1927–2008)
- Wilhelm Schmidt-Biggemann (1946)
- Robert Spaemann (1927–2018)
- Bernard Willms (1931–1991)

== Positions ==
Ritter had been holding an advanced seminar in Münster since 1947, which was known as the Collegium Philosophicum, initially in a barrack in front of Münster Castle with around 10 to 12 participants. Many of his direct philosophical students, as well as others, had regularly attended. Although the term “Ritter School” was used early on and frequently in the specialist literature, there is a broad consensus both among Ritter's direct students, such as Robert Spaemann, and in the research literature that “the Ritter School” was rather heterogeneous in terms of concrete positioning. To speak of a “school” in the actual sense is therefore largely problematized. Although Odo Marquard initially spoke in a frequently quoted dictum of a “school convergence as a long-term late effect”, he corrected this in 1989: “the Ritter students are now - more or less - on different paths again”. The Ritter School does not represent a common coherent philosophical doctrine; however, it can be understood as an attempt to build on a hermeneutical tradition that is guided by Hegel's maxim that what matters in philosophy is to see what reality is and to represent and express the reason contained in reality. The “Ritter School” has often been described as “neoconservative”, value-conservative or “modernity-conservative”. In the philosophy of the GDR, the criticism of Marxism by Ritter, Rohrmoser and others was sometimes perceived as a “crusade [...] against Marxism.” Ritter and many of his students distanced themselves from representatives of the “Frankfurt School”, whose ideas they referred to as “Sozialismusromantik” (romantic Socialism), for example. Conversely, Jürgen Habermas, for example, spoke of a “theory of the post-Enlightenment.” Ernst Tugendhat, who had studied in Münster at the time of Ritter, spoke of an “ethical counter-Enlightenment”. Odo Marquard, on the other hand, described the “Ritter School” as part of the Enlightenment project, which, however, was less close to Descartes, Turgot, Fichte, Marx, Lukács, Sartre or Habermas than to Montaigne, Locke, Montesquieu, Tocqueville, Weber or Lübbe. Marquard himself “was (like Karlfried Gründer) one of the few in the Collegium on whom ‘critical theory’ and in particular the work of Theodor W. Adorno had not remained without influence.” Volker Gerhardt sees the “Ritter School” and the Frankfurt School as “much closer than many people think”.

In the meantime, Jens Hacke has proposed and justified the term “liberal-conservative” in a monograph. In the introduction, he distinguishes his account from the descriptions of determined critics from the so-called “Frankfurt School” on the one hand, and from the “affirmative-conservative standpoint on the other: there, the necessary analytical level is often undercut”. As a liberal-conservative alternative to the “Frankfurt School”, the political philosophy of the Ritter School strove for an affirmation of the state and its institutions that emphasized the de facto legitimacy of the democratically constituted Federal Republic based on the Basic Law. For Jens Hacke, the Ritter School is therefore part of the success story of the Federal Republic: “The Ritter students helped to establish the cultural and intellectual legitimacy of the Federal Republic. Their unreserved defense of this state contributed to its internal acceptance and thus to its successive intellectual foundation. This can confidently be described as a historical achievement.” The historian and publicist of the new right, Karlheinz Weißmann, emphasizes in a review of Hacke's work in Junge Freiheit that Willms, Maurer and Rohrmoser, for example, were more critical of liberalism. Willms, for example, has indeed undergone a transformation here: initially “still a very faithful student of the Ritter school, which was actually so civic-minded”, he later becomes “a rather steep right-wing bird himself, who, via Hobbes and Fichte, moved more and more towards the nation”. Due to relevant publications on the Nazi era, Ritter himself is credited with involvement in “philosophical enterprises conforming to National Socialism” and an “elegant opportunism” that “aims to Germanize the origins of European modernity”. Hans Jörg Sandkühler notes: “In 1933, Ritter made a change of position in philosophy in the interests of his professional career. He leads away from Marx - to where? He moves into Nazi institutions to the extent that their mistrust accompanies him and 'tests of endurance' are demanded of him.”

Ritter had prominently defended a political and cultural-philosophical conservatism in critical approval of “modernity” - a program that Rohrmoser, for example, resolutely took up. Ritter's political philosophy is based primarily on Aristotle and Hegel, but also engages with Arnold Gehlen, Ernst Jünger and Carl Schmitt. Many of his students followed suit. The “Ritter School”, for example, is described as “Hegel conformist”. Among Ritter's students, some favor weakening and some strengthening modifications. Maurer and Rohrmoser, for example, have “theologically and politically modified” Ritter's “schulbildende” (school-forming) interpretation of Hegel's political thought, which contains, for example, the well-known theorem of a “double structure of modernity”. Perhaps best known is the so-called compensation model of the Ritter School, which for example, has been criticized by Herbert Schnädelbach. According to this criticism, culture compensates for the modern rationalization and objectification of the lifeworld through aestheticization, for example. Odo Marquard has described the “Ritter School” as the “wing of hermeneutic thought [...] that rehabilitated practical philosophy”. Friedrich Kambartel also sees a renewal of practical philosophy through Ritter and claims that Ritter's practical reason “only by visualizing its historical unfolding does it leave the level of an abstract ought and become capable of concrete criticism and legitimation.” In practical philosophy, Ritter and many of his students are known for neo-Aristotelianism, which also includes, for example, Ritter's defence of the classical concept of natural law. This position was attacked both as a systematic thesis, e.g. by Habermas, and criticized by Karl-Otto Apel, for example, as an inaccurate interpretation of Aristotle. With regard to the philosophy of religion and culture, Hermann Lübbe diagnoses a “convergence of philosophical interests” between the Ritter school and, for example, Hans Blumenberg or Eric Voegelin, for example: the rejection of an “ideology-critical understanding of religion, which treats it as an epiphenomenon of the materially based human order of life rather than as a formative force”.

In particular, the project of the Historischen Wörterbuchs der Philosophie (Historical Dictionary of Philosophy), the world's largest philosophical dictionary, also occupied many representatives of the “Ritter School” for decades. In the foreword to the first volume, the main editor Ritter refers to Gadamer and Erich Rothacker, among others. The original methodology of this work has been commented on divergently, for example as a “continuation of the - theory-abstinent, systematic philosophy and thus in particular all transcendental thinking rejecting - intellectual and conceptual-historical approach, of which Rothacker was the protagonist”. Reinhold Aschenberg believes that Rothacker (the founder of the Archiv für Begriffsgeschichte), Gadamer and Ritter formed a “dominant triumvirate” that “from the second half of the 1940s onwards, was able to continue the suppression of all systematic and critical thinking sponsored by National Socialism without interruption and to replace it with the somehow ‘historical’ orientation” that “was to become so characteristic of the philosophy of the Federal Republic until the 1970s.“ In international discourse, the Historischen Wörterbuchs is generally recognized today as a definitive standard work of philosophical and conceptual historical research.

== Literature ==
- Gedenkschrift Joachim Ritter. Zur Gedenkfeier zu Ehren des am 3. August 1974 verstorbenen em. ordentlichen Professors der Philosophie Dr. phil. Joachim Ritter, 6. Februar 1976, Aula der Westfälischen Wilhelms-Universität, Münster, Schloß. Aschendorff, Münster 1978, ISBN 3-402-04428-5 (Schriften der Gesellschaft zur Förderung der Westfälischen Wilhelms-Universität Münster 65).
- Ulrich Dierse: Joachim Ritter und seine Schüler. In: Anton Hügli, Paul Lübcke (Hrsg.): Philosophie im 20. Jahrhundert. Band 1: Phänomenologie, Hermeneutik, Existenzphilosophie und kritische Theorie. Rowohlt, Reinbek 1992, ISBN 3-499-55455-0, S. 237–278 (Rowohlts Enzyklopädie 455).
- Ulrich Dierse (Hrsg.): Joachim Ritter zum Gedenken. Steiner Verlag u. a., Stuttgart u. a. 2004, ISBN 3-515-08626-9 (Akademie der Wissenschaften und der Literatur Mainz, Abhandlungen der Geistes- und Sozialwissenschaftlichen Klasse 2004, Nr. 4).
- Jens Hacke: Philosophie der Bürgerlichkeit. Die liberalkonservative Begründung der Bundesrepublik. Vandenhoeck & Ruprecht, Göttingen 2006, ISBN 3-525-36842-9 (Bürgertum NF 3), (Zugleich: Berlin, Humboldt-Univ., Diss., 2004).
- Martin Ingenfeld, Zwischen Fortschritt und Verfall.Zur Diskussion von Religion und Moderne im Ausgang von Joachim Ritter, Köln 2016, ISBN 978-3-946198-12-3.
- Georg Lohmann: Neokonservative Antworten auf moderne Sinnverlusterfahrungen. Über Odo Marquard, Hermann Lübbe und Robert Spaemann. In: Richard Faber (Hrsg.): Konservatismus in Geschichte und Gegenwart. Verlag Königshausen & Neumann, Würzburg 1991, ISBN 3-88479-592-9, S. 183–201.
- Henning Ottmann: Joachim Ritter. In: Julian Nida-Rümelin (Hrsg.): Philosophie der Gegenwart in Einzeldarstellungen. Von Adorno bis v. Wright (= Kröners Taschenausgabe. Band 423). Kröner, Stuttgart 1991, ISBN 3-520-42301-4, S. 504–509 (Darin auch Personenartikel zu Lübbe, Marquard und Spaemann).
- Mark Schweda: Joachim Ritter und die Ritter-Schule (Zur Einführung). Junius, Hamburg 2015, ISBN 978-3885067085.
- Mark Schweda und Ulrich von Bülow (Hrsg.): Entzweite Moderne. Zur Aktualität Joachim Ritters und seiner Schüler. Wallstein, Göttingen 2017.
