= Conceptual history =

Study of the history of concepts

Conceptual history (also the history of concepts or, from German, Begriffsgeschichte) is a branch of historical and cultural studies that deals with the historical semantics of terms. It sees the etymology and the change in meaning of terms as forming a crucial basis for contemporary cultural, conceptual and linguistic understanding. Conceptual history deals with the evolution of paradigmatic ideas and value systems over time, such as "liberty" or "reform". It argues that social history – indeed all historical reflection – must begin with an understanding of historically contingent cultural values and practices in their particular contexts over time, not merely as unchanging ideologies or processes.

== Description and history ==
Interest in conceptual history was given a particular boost in the 20th century through the publication of the Historisches Wörterbuch der Philosophie, the Geschichtliche Grundbegriffe, and the journal Archiv für Begriffsgeschichte.

Conceptual history is an interdisciplinary methodology. Alongside philosopher Joachim Ritter, historians Otto Brunner, Werner Conze, and Reinhart Koselleck, and sociologist Erich Rothacker are viewed as its pioneers in the German-speaking world and internationally. Raymond Williams was the leading scholar in the English-speaking world. Since the 1980s, a relevant development of the history of concepts (storia dei concetti), has been promoted by a numerous group of Italian scholars, counting among them Alessandro Biral, Giuseppe Duso, Carlo Galli, and Roberto Esposito, founders of the Centro di ricerca sul lessico politico europeo. Outlets of the Italian debate on conceptual history have been the short-lived Centauro (1981-1986) and Filosofia Politica, founded in 1987. Today, conceptual history is promoted also by the History of Concepts Group and its peer-reviewed journal Contributions to the History of Concepts under the lead of Margrit Pernau, Jan Ifversen, and Jani Marjanen. Another journal that publishes research in conceptual history is the Journal of the History of Ideas. Examples of conceptual histories include a genealogy of the concept of globalization drawing on the approach of Williams written by Paul James and Manfred B. Steger:

Although keywords represent a critical mass of the vocabulary of any given era, the history of their meaning construction often remains obscure. "Globalization" is no exception. While the meanings of other seminal "keywords" such as "economics", "culture", or "modernity" evolved rather slowly and built upon a relatively continuous base, "globalization" has had a very short and discontinuous history.

This historiographical approach has also been used by the Cambridge Group for the History and Epistemology of Psychiatry who, since the 1980s, has published a long series of papers on the ‘conceptual history’ of the most relevant mental symptoms and diseases.

== See also ==
- Geistesgeschichte
- Genealogy (philosophy)
- Hermeneutics
- Historicism
- History of ideas
- Jus commune
- Philosophical analysis
