= Nicolás Gómez Dávila =

Colombian philosopher and aphorist (1913–1994)

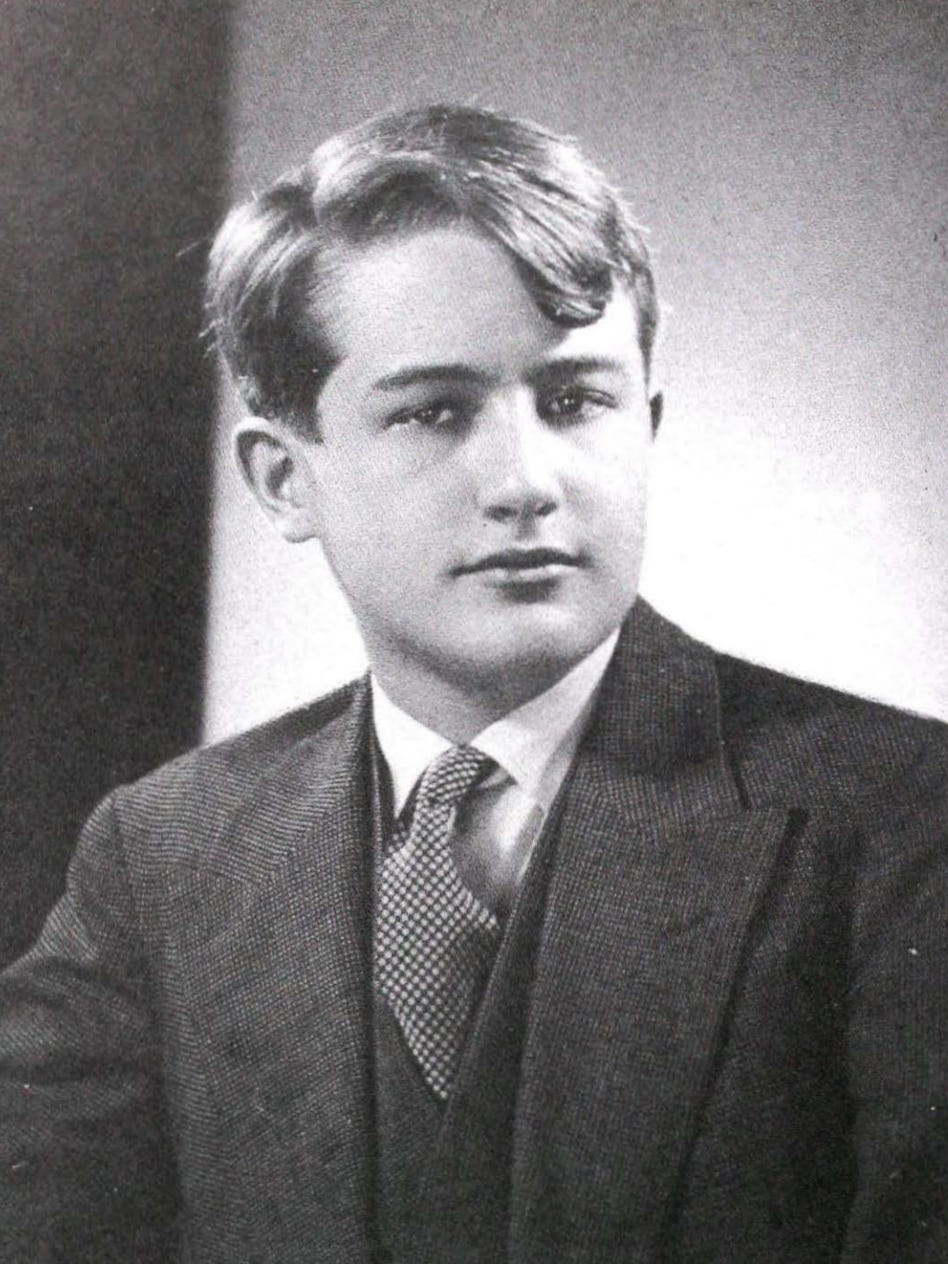
- Gómez Dávila in 1930
- Born: 18 May 1913; Bogotá, Colombia
- Died: 17 May 1994 (aged 80); Bogotá, Colombia

Philosophical work
- Era: 20th-century philosophy
- Region: Western philosophy
- School: Traditionalist conservatism Reactionism; Elitism
- Institutions: University of Los Andes
- Main interests: Aesthetics; Classics; History; Literature; Political philosophy; Philosophy of religion

Nicolás Gómez Dávila (Note: Spanish: [nikoˈlas ˈɣomes ˈðaβila]) (18 May 1913 – 17 May 1994) was a Colombian philosopher and aphorist. He is sometimes referred to as the "Nietzsche of the Andes."

For a long time not appearing particularly interested in a mass propagation of his work, Gómez Dávila remained an obscure figure until the final few years of his life, when translations attracted important attention, mainly in German-speaking countries.

Gómez Dávila was a staunch critic of modernity. His work consists almost entirely of aphorisms which he called "escolios" ("scholia" or "glosses").

== Biography ==
Nicolás Gómez Dávila was born in Bogotá on 18 May 1913. He was a scholar who spent most of his life in the circle of his friends and within the confines of his library. He belonged to the upper circles of Colombian society and was educated in Paris. Due to severe pneumonia, he spent about two years at home where he was taught by private teachers and developed a lifelong love of classical literature. He never, however, attended a university. In the 1930s, he went back from Paris to Colombia, never to visit Europe again, except for a six-month stay with his wife in 1948. He built up an immense library containing more than 30,000 volumes around which his literary existence centred. In 1948, he helped found the University of the Andes in Bogotá.

In 1954, the first volume of Gómez Dávila's works was published by his brother, a compilation of notes and aphorisms under the title Notas I – the second volume of which never appeared. The book remained virtually unknown because only 100 copies were printed and these were presented as gifts to his friends. In 1959, he followed this with a small book of essays under the title of Textos I (again, no second volume was published). These essays develop basic concepts of his philosophical anthropology as well as his philosophy of history, often in literary language full of metaphors.

After the collapse of the military dictatorship in 1958, Gómez Dávila was offered the post of chief advisor to the state president which he rejected as he did with respect to later offers, in 1974, to become ambassador in London. Though he supported the later president Alberto Lleras Camargo's role in bringing down the dictatorship, he refrained from any political activity himself, a decision he had already reached early on in his practice as a writer.

From this decision resulted his strong criticism not only of left-wing but also of right-wing and conservative political practices, even though his explicitly reactionary principles show some similarities to conservative viewpoints. His skeptical anthropology was based on a close study of Thucydides and Jacob Burckhardt as well as his affirmation of hierarchical structures of order on society, state and church. Gómez Dávila emphatically criticised the concept of the sovereignty of the people as an illegitimate divinisation of man and a rejection of the sovereignty of God. He was likewise deeply critical of the Second Vatican Council, particularly deploring the replacement of the Ecclesiastical Latin Tridentine Mass with the vernacular Mass of Paul VI in the wake of the council. Similar to Juan Donoso Cortés, Gómez Dávila believed that all political errors ultimately resulted from theological errors, which is why his thought can be described as a form of political theology.

The modern ideologies such as liberalism, democracy, and socialism, are the main targets of Gómez Dávila's criticism, because the world influenced by these ideologies appeared to him decadent and corrupt.

Gómez Dávila discussed a vast range of topics, philosophical and theological questions, problems of literature, art, and aesthetics, philosophy of history and the writing of history. He employed a literary method of succinct statements with a great sensibility for matters of style and tone. The literary method he developed is the gloss, the scholion, which he used to comment on the world, particularly in the five volumes of Escolios a un texto implícito (1977; 1986; 1992) that he published from the seventies to the nineties. He created "the reactionary" as his unmistakable literary mask and made it into a distinctive type of thinking about the modern world as such. In his later work he attempted to define the "reactionary" with which he identified in an affirmative way by locating him somewhere beyond the traditional position of left and right. On the basis of a traditionalist Catholicism influenced by the intellectual probity of Friedrich Nietzsche and others he criticized modernity and saw himself as a partisan for a "truth that will not die".

Gómez Dávila made no attempts to make his writings widely known. Only by way of German (and later Italian as well as French and Polish) translation beginning in the late 1980s did Gómez Dávila's ideas begin to be read among poets and philosophers such as Ernst Jünger, Robert Spaemann, Martin Mosebach, Botho Strauss, Reinhart Maurer, Rolf Schilling, Heiner Müller, Erik von Kuehnelt-Leddihn, Franco Volpi, Asfa-Wossen Asserate and Krzysztof Urbanek.

== Published works ==
- Escolios a Un Texto Implicito: Obra Completa. Nicolas Gomez Davila, Franco Volpi. July 2006. Hardcover, 408 pages. Villegas Editores. ISBN 958-8156-70-X, ISBN 978-958-8156-70-5
- Notas I, Mexico 1954 (new edition Bogotá 2003).
- Textos I, Bogotá 1959 (new edition Bogotá 2002).
- Escolios a un texto implícito, 2 volumes, Bogotá 1977.
- Nuevos escolios a un texto implícito, 2 volumes, Bogotá 1986.
- De iure, in: Revista del Colegio Mayor de Nuestra Senora del Rosario 81. Jg., Nr. 542 (April–June 1988), p. 67–85.
- https://www.academia.edu/34702433/De_Iure_-_Nicol%C3%A1s_G%C3%B3mez_D%C3%A1vila_Bilingual_edition_ De iure, Bilingual Edition, translated by Tomás Molina, in: Revista del Colegio Mayor de Nuestra Senora del Rosario Vl 3., Nr. 39 (September 2017).
- Sucesivos escolios a un texto implícito, Santafé de Bogotá 1992 (new edition Barcelona 2002).
- "El reaccionario auténtico". Revista de la Universidad de Antioquia (in Spanish) (240): 16–19. April–June 1995. Archived from the original on 29 July 2014.
- Escolios a un texto implícito. Selección, Bogotá 2001.
- Alle origini del mondo, edited by Antonio Lombardi, Villasanta (MB): Limina Mentis, 2013, Translation of Textos I (V) (1959).
- Scholia to an Implicit Text. Bilingual Selected Edition. Prologue by Till Kinzel. Villegas Editores, Bogotá 2013, ISBN 978-958-8836-00-3

== See also ==
- Aristocracy
- Criticism of democracy
- José Ortega y Gasset
- Joseph de Maistre
- Traditionalist School
