= Secular paganism =

Upholds virtues and principles associated with paganism while rejecting belief in deities

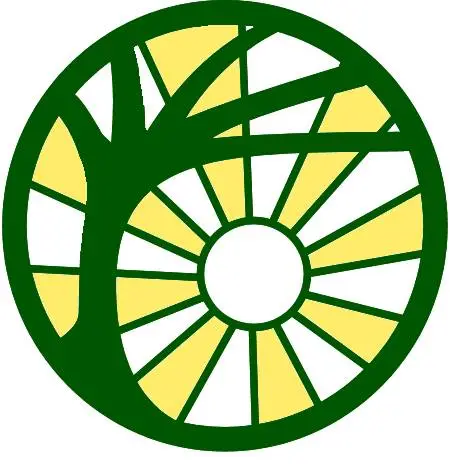
Logo of the Atheopagan Society.

Secular paganism, alternately called naturalistic paganism or humanistic paganism, is an outlook upholding virtues and principles associated with modern paganism while maintaining a secular worldview. Approaches to secular paganism vary, but typically include the respect for living creatures and the Earth itself, while rejecting belief in deities. Secular pagans may recognize goddesses/gods as useful metaphors for different cycles of life, or reframe magic as a purely psychological practice. The specific path of atheopaganism was developed in the twenty-first century, as guided by the Atheopagan Society.

== Historical background ==
As Europe was Christianized, the Church Fathers regularly secularized pagan deities and myths through euhemerism, a practice where the deities are interpreted as historical figures who at some point had become worshipped as gods. Clement of Alexandria summarized the approach in Cohortatio ad gentes, addressing the pagans: "Those to whom you bow were once men like yourselves."

The 18th century produced a considerable body of works that sought to "unveil" concepts from the ancient world, including the pagan gods. This gave birth to rationalist and atheist interpretations of ancient mythological concepts, and ancient texts were sometimes read as if they were written by contemporaries to the Enlightenment philosophers, discussing the same topics from the same humanist perspective.

== Neopaganism ==
Some adherents of modern Paganism have developed humanistic or secular approaches, where important aspects of a pagan worldview are embraced, but deities are not revered as real or supernatural beings. These approaches take on a variety of different forms.

In the 19th century, the French writer Louis Ménard used the term "mystical paganism" for his attempt to create a substitute for organized religion, in which he used a humanistic approach to recognize the importance of symbols and the irrational. The concept had significant influence on the poet Leconte de Lisle and the Parnassian movement.

Some pagan revivalists are inspired by Carl Jung's theories about archetypes and the collective unconscious. Jung handled esoteric and mythological subjects in a secular and scientific, yet not dismissive manner.

The biologist Andreas Weber promotes what he calls "poetic ecology" and "poetic materialism". This has been a source of inspiration for people such as Henrik Hallgren of the Swedish Forn Sed Assembly.

== Political theology ==
In the context of political theology, the philosopher Odo Marquard has argued that the separation of powers is a "disenchanted return of polytheism"; his 1979 essay "In Praise of Polytheism" provoked controversy among German scholars. Contrary to Marquard, the philosopher Jacob Taubes—who defended a secularized version of apocalyptic eschatology—argued that the secularized, political version of paganism is totalitarianism. In practice, however, secular pagans tend to be progressive in political outlook, as reflected, for example, in the Atheopagan 4 Sacred Pillars and 13 Principles.

== See also ==
- Covenant of Unitarian Universalist Pagans
- Crypto-paganism
- Cultural Christians and Cultural Muslims
- Naturalistic pantheism
- World Pantheist Movement
