= List of works by Quentin Skinner =

This is a list of books and articles by and interviews with the British intellectual historian, Quentin Skinner. Regarded as one of the founders of the Cambridge School of the history of political thought for his work on historical method, Skinner's principal empirical focus as a historian has been on the history of Early Modern political thought. Has he written extensively on the political philosophies of Niccolò Machiavelli, Thomas Hobbes, and John Milton. He has also published books and articles on the reception of classical conceptions of liberty in the Early Modern period, the history of rhetoric, and the rhetorical techniques of William Shakespeare.

== Books ==
1. The Foundations of Modern Political Thought: Volume I: The Renaissance, Cambridge University Press, 1978. ISBN 978-0-521-29337-2 (Translated into Arabic, Chinese, French, Greek, Italian, Korean, Japanese, Persian, Portuguese, Russian, Spanish, Turkish.)

2. The Foundations of Modern Political Thought: Volume II: The Age of Reformation, Cambridge University Press, 1978. ISBN 978-0-521-29435-5 (Translated into Arabic, Chinese, French, Greek, Italian, Japanese, Persian, Portuguese, Russian, Spanish.)

3(a). Machiavelli, Oxford University Press, 1981.

3(b). Machiavelli: A Very Short Introduction [A revised version of 3(a)], Oxford University Press, 2000. ISBN 978-0-19-285407-0 (Translated into Albanian, Arabic, Chinese, Czech, French, German, Greek, Hebrew, Hungarian, Indonesian, Italian, Japanese, Korean, Kurdish, Malay, Polish, Persian, Portuguese, Romanian, Russian, Spanish, Swedish, Turkish.)

3(c). Machiavelli: A Very Short Introduction [a new and updated edition of 3(b)], Oxford University Press, 2019. ISBN 978-0-19-883757-2

4. Reason and Rhetoric in the Philosophy of Hobbes, Cambridge University Press, 1996. ISBN 978-0-521-59645-9 (Translated into Chinese, Italian, Portuguese.)

5. Liberty before Liberalism, Cambridge University Press, 1998. ISBN 978-1-107-68953-4 (Translated into Chinese, French, Greek, Italian, Korean, Persian, Polish, Portuguese, Russian, Spanish, and Turkish.)

6. Visions of Politics: Volume I: Regarding Method, Cambridge University Press, 2002. ISBN 978-0-521-58926-0 (Translated into Chinese, French, Greek, Italian, Korean, Persian, Polish, Portuguese, and Spanish.)

7. Visions of Politics: Volume II: Renaissance Virtues (with 12 colour plates), Cambridge University Press, 2002. ISBN 978-0-521-58926-0 (Translated into Chinese, Italian, and Polish.)

8. Visions of Politics: Volume III: Hobbes and Civil Science, Cambridge University Press, 2002. ISBN 978-0-521-89060-1

9. L’artiste en philosophie politique (with 8 colour plates), Editions de Seuil, Paris, 2003. ISBN 978-2-912107-15-2

10. Hobbes and Republican Liberty (with 19 illustrations), Cambridge University Press, 2008. ISBN 978-2-912107-15-2 (Translated into Chinese, French, German, Portuguese, Spanish, and Turkish.)

11. La verité et l’historien, ed. Christopher Hamel, Editions EHESS, Paris, 2011. ISBN 978-2-7132-2368-6

12. Die drei Körper des Staates, Wallstein, Göttingen, 2012. ISBN 978-3-8353-1157-2

13. Forensic Shakespeare, Oxford University Press, 2014. ISBN 978-0-19-955824-7 (Translated into Chinese.)

14. From Humanism to Hobbes: Studies in Rhetoric and Politics (with 45 illustrations), Cambridge University Press, 2018. ISBN 978-1-107-56936-2

15. Liberty as independence: the making and unmaking of a political ideal, Cambridge University Press, 2025. ISBN 978-1-107-02773-2

== Articles ==
1965: ‘Hobbes on Sovereignty: an Unknown Discussion’, Political Studies 13, pp. 213–18.

1966: ‘The Limits of Historical Explanations’, Philosophy 41, pp. 199–215.

1970: ‘Conventions and the Understanding of Speech Acts’, The Philosophical Quarterly 20, pp. 118–38.

1971: ‘On Performing and Explaining Linguistic Actions’, The Philosophical Quarterly 21, pp. 1-21.

1973: ‘The Empirical Theorists of Democracy and their Critics’, Political Theory 1, pp. 287- 306. 1974: ‘Some Problems in the Analysis of Political Thought and Action’, Political Theory 2, pp. 277–303.

1975: ‘Hermeneutics and the Role of History’, New Literary History 7, pp. 209–32.

1978: ‘Action and Context’, Proceedings of the Aristotelian Society 52, pp. 57–69.

1980: ‘The Origins of the Calvinist Theory of Revolution’ in After the Reformation, ed. Barbara Malament (London, 1980), pp. 309–30.

1985: ‘Introduction: The Return of Grand Theory’ in The Return of Grand Theory in the Human Sciences, ed. Quentin Skinner (Cambridge, 1985), pp. 1-20.

1986: ‘The Paradoxes of Political Liberty’ in The Tanner Lectures on Human Values, Volume VII, ed. S. McMurrin (Cambridge, 1986), pp. 225–250. [Reprinted in Liberty, ed. David Miller, Oxford Readings in Politics and Government (Oxford, 1991) and in Equal Freedom: Selected Tanner Lectures on Human Values, ed. Stephen Darwall (Ann Arbor, 1995). Also available in Chinese and Romanian.]

1988: ‘Warrender and Skinner on Hobbes: A Reply’, Political Studies 36, pp. 692–5.

1989a: ‘Il concetto inglese di libertà’, Filosofia politica 3, pp. 77–102.

1989b: ‘The State’ in Political Innovation and Conceptual Change, ed. Terence Ball, James Farr and R. L. Hanson, Cambridge, pp. 90–131. Also available in Czech in Quentin Skinner (2012). O státě, Prague, pp. 9-54.

1992a: ‘On Justice, the Common Good and the Priority of Liberty’ in Dimensions of Radical Democracy, ed. Chantal Mouffe (London, 1992), pp. 211–24. Also available in French.

1992b: ‘Les idées républicains de liberté et de citoyenneté’, Rue Descartes 3, pp. 125–44. 1992c: ‘Liberty and Legal Obligation in Hobbes’s Leviathan’ in Cambridge Essays in Jurisprudence, ed. Ross Harrison (Oxford, 1992), pp. 231–56.

1992d: ‘The Italian City-Republics’ in Democracy: The Unfinished Journey, ed. John Dunn (Oxford, 1992), pp. 57–69. 1993: ‘Two Concepts of Citizenship’, Tijdschrift voor Filosofie, pp. 403–19. Also available in French.

1994: ‘Modernity and disenchantment: Some historical reflections’ in Philosophy in an age of pluralism, ed. James Tully (Cambridge 1994), pp. 37–48. Also available in German. Reprinted in The Politics of Postmodernity, ed. James Good and Irving Velody (Cambridge, 1998), pp. 49–60.

1995: ‘The Vocabulary of Renaissance Republicanism: a Cultural longue-durée?’ in Language and Images of Renaissance Italy, ed. Alison Brown (Oxford 1995), pp. 87–110.

1996a: ‘From Hume’s Intentions to Deconstruction and Back’, Journal of Political Philosophy 4, pp. 142–54.

1996b: ‘Rede en retorica in de filosofie van Hobbes’, contribution to ‘Dossier Quentin Skinner’ Krisis 64, pp. 9–16. 1998: ‘Machiavelli’s Political Morality’ European Review 6, pp. 321–5.

2001a: ‘Political Theory after the Enlightenment Project’ in Schools of Thought, ed. Joan W. Scott and Debra Keates (Princeton 2001), pp. 15–24.

2001b: ‘Why laughing mattered in the Renaissance’, History of Political Thought 22, pp. 418- 47. Also available in French, Greek, Portuguese.

2001c: ‘The rise of, challenge to and prospects for a Collingwoodian approach to the history of political thought’ in The History of Political Thought in National Context, ed. Dario Castiglione and Iain Hampsher-Monk (Cambridge, 2001), pp. 175–88.

2002a: ‘A Third Concept of Liberty’, Proceedings of the British Academy, 117, pp. 237–68. Also available in Chinese, Danish, Finnish, French, German, Greek, Romanian, Spanish. An abbreviated version published as 2006d.

2002b: ‘Classical Liberty and the Coming of the English Civil War’ in Republicanism: A Shared European Heritage, Volume II: The Values of Republicanism in Early Modern Europe, ed. Martin van Gelderen and Quentin Skinner (Cambridge 2002), pp. 9-28. 2002c: ‘Visions of Civil Liberty’ in The Future of the Past, ed. Peter Martland (London, 2002), pp. 104–12. 2003: ‘States and the Freedom of Citizens’ in States and Citizens: History, Theory, Prospects, ed. Quentin Skinner and Bo Sträth (Cambridge, 2003), pp. 11–27. Also available in Chinese, Greek.

2004a: ‘Hobbes and the Classical Theory of Laughter’ in Leviathan After 350 Years, ed. Tom Sorell and Luc Foisneau (Oxford 2004), pp. 139–66.

2004b: ‘Considerazioni sulla libertà repubblicana’ in Libertà politica e virtù civile, ed. Maurizio Viroli (Torino, 2004), pp. 249–60. 2005b: ‘On Intellectual History and the History of Books,’ Contributions to the History of Concepts, 1, pp. 29–36.

2006b: ‘Afterword’ in British Political Thought in History, Literature and Theory, 1500–1800, ed. David Armitage (Cambridge 2006), pp. 278–85.

2006c: ‘Surveying the Foundations: a retrospect and reassessment’ in Rethinking the Foundations of Modern Political Thought, ed. Annabel Brett and James Tully (Cambridge, 2006), pp. 236–61.

2006d: ‘A Third Concept of Liberty’ in The Liberty Reader, ed. David Miller (Boulder, 2006), pp. 243–54.

2006e-2007a: ‘La teoría evolutiva de la libertad de Thomas Hobbes’, Revista de Estudios Politicos 134 pp. 35-69 and 135, pp. 11–36.

2007b: ‘Hobbes on Persons, Authors and Representatives’ in The Cambridge Companion to Leviathan ed. Patricia Springborg (Cambridge 2007), pp. 157–80.

2007c: ‘The Monarchical Republic Enthroned’ in The Monarchical Republic of Early Modern England, ed. John F. McDiarmid (Farnham, 2007), pp. 233–44.

2007d: ‘Wie ich Ideenhistoriker wurde’, Zeitschrift fűr Ideengeschichte, 2, pp. 79–88. 2008a: ‘Freedom as the Absence of Arbitrary Power’ in Republicanism and Political Theory, ed. Cécile Laborde and John Maynor (Oxford, 2008), pp. 83–101. Revised and extended version in Ideas in History 3 (2008) pp. 11–37. Also available in French, German, Norwegian.

2008b: ‘Is it still possible to interpret texts?’ The International Journal of Psychoanalysis 89, pp. 647–54.

2008c: ‘Political Rhetoric and the Role of Ridicule’ in The Politics of Democratization in Europe: Concepts and Histories, ed. Kari Palonen (Farnham, 2008), pp. 137–49.

2008d: ‘History: Transformation and Immutability’ in The University of Cambridge: an 800 th Anniversary Portrait, ed. Peter Pagnamenta (London, 2008), pp. 122–6.

2009a: ‘Afterword: Shakespeare and humanist culture’ in Shakespeare and Early Modern Political Thought, ed. David Armitage, Conal Condren and Andrew Fitzmaurice (Cambridge, 2009), pp. 271–81.

2009b: ‘Értelem és retorika Hobbes filozófiájában’, Helikon 1–2, pp. 50–69.

2009c: ‘On trusting the judgement of our rulers’ in Political Judgement, ed. Richard Bourke and Raymond Geuss, Cambridge, pp. 113–30.

2009d: ‘Reply’ in ‘Book Symposium: Hobbes and Political Theory’ in Hobbes Studies, 22 pp. 199–207.

2009e: ‘On the slogans of republican political theory’, European Journal of Political Theory 9, pp. 1–8.

2009f: ‘Repenser la liberté politique’, Raisons politiques 36, pp. 109–30. 2010a: ‘Truth and Explanation in History’ in Truth in Science, the Humanities, and Religion, ed. Nicolette Mout and Werner Stauffacher (Dordrecht, 2010), pp. 89–95.

2010b: [with Hent Kalmo] ‘Introduction: a concept in fragments’ in Sovereignty in Fragments, ed. Hent Kalmo and Quentin Skinner (Cambridge, 2010), pp. 1-25.

2011: ‘El historiador y la verdad’ in Historia del análisis politico, ed. Pablo Sánchez Garrido (Madrid, 2011), pp. 53–64.

2012a: ‘On the Liberty of the Ancients and the Moderns: A Reply to my Critics’ in ‘Symposium: On Quentin Skinner, from Method to Politics’, Journal of the History of Ideas 73 (2012), pp. 69–146, at pp. 127–46.

2012b: [with Christopher Ricks] ‘Up for Interpretation or What Is This Thing that Hearsay Is Not?’ Literary Imagination 14 (2012), pp. 125–42.

2012c: ‘Philosophical analysis and the interpretation of texts’ Rivista di filosofia 103, pp. 465- 77.

2012d: ‘Niccolò Machiavelli’s The Prince’ in Philosophy Bites Back, ed. David Edmonds and Nigel Warburton (Oxford, 2012), pp. 37–50.

2012e: [with Carole Pateman] ‘Hobbes, History, Politics and Gender’, in Feminist Interpretations of Thomas Hobbes, ed. Nancy J. Hirschmann and Joanne H. Wright (Philadelphia, 2012), pp. 18–43.

2013a: ‘What does freedom mean to us?’ [Text in Russian; discussion in English] Ab imperio: Studies of New Imperial History and Nationalism 1, pp. 21–63.

2013b: ‘Liberty and Security: The Early-Modern English Debate’ in Sicherheit in der Frühen Neuzeit: Norm, Praxis, Repräsentation, ed. Christoph Kampmann and Ulrich Niggemann (Köln, 2013), p. 30–42.

2014: ‘Freedom of inclination: On the republican theory of liberty’ Juncture 21 (2), pp. 131- 5. 2015: ‘O svobode respublik’, in Sovremennaya Respublikanskaya Teoriya Svobody, ed. Evgeny Roshchin (St Petersburg, 2015), pp. 25–42.

2016a: ‘Shakespeare and the Legal World’ Counsel Magazine, June, pp. 29–31.

2016c: ‘Thinking about Liberty: an Historian’s Approach’, The seventh annual Balzan Lecture (Olschki, Florence), 75pp. 2017b: ‘Der dreifaltige Staat’, Zeitschrift für Ideengeschichte 11, pp. 79–92.

2017a: ‘Der dreifaltige Staat’, Zeitschrift für Ideengeschichte 11, pp. 79-92.

2017b: ‘Wahrheit, Uberzeugung und Interpretation’ in Ideengeschichte Heute, ed. D. Timothy Goering, Bielefeld, pp. 55-68.

2017c: ‘Wahrheit, Uberzeugung und Interpretation’ in Ideengeschichte Heute, ed. D. Timothy Goering, Bielefeld, pp. 55–68. 2018a: ‘Climate Change in the Light of the Past’ in Nature, Action and the Future: Political Thought and the Environment, ed. Katrina Forrester and Sophie Smith, Cambridge, pp. 221–30.

2018a: ‘Climate Change in the Light of the Past’ in Nature, Action and the Future: Political Thought and the Environment, ed. Katrina Forrester and Sophie Smith, Cambridge, pp. 221-30.

2018b: [with Kinch Hoekstra] ‘The liberties of the ancients’, History of European Ideas 44, pp. 812–25.

2018c: [with Kinch Hoekstra] ‘The liberties of the ancients’, History of European Ideas 44, pp. 812-25.

2018d: ‘On the person of the state’ in State Formations, ed John L. Brooke, Julia C. Strauss and Greg Anderson, Cambridge, pp. 25-44.

2019: ‘The last academic project’ in Between Utopia and Realism: The Political Thought of Judith N. Shklar, ed. Samantha Ashenden and Andreas Hess (Philadelphia, 2019), pp. 253-66.

2022a: ‘On Neo-Roman Liberty: A response and Reassessment’ in Rethinking Liberty Before Liberalism, ed. Hannah Dawson and Annelien de Dijn, Cambridge, pp. 233-66.

2022b: ‘A Bridge between Art and Philosophy: The Case of Thomas Hobbes’, The European Review 30, pp. 1-12.

2023a: ‘Political Philosophy and the Uses of History’ in History in the Humanities and Social Sciences, ed. Richard Bourke and Quentin Skinner, Cambridge, pp. 194-210.

2023b: ‘Hobbes on the theology and politics of time’ in Time, History and Political Thought, ed. John Robertson (Cambridge University Press 2023), pp. 136-56.

2024a: ‘Hobbes’s Leviathan Frontispiece: Some New Observations’ in Aby Warburg 150: Work, Legacy, Promise, ed. David Freedberg and Claudia Wedepohl, Boston, pp. 319-27.

2024b: ‘Neo-Roman liberty: a genealogy’ in The Oxford Handbook of Republicanism, ed. Frank Lovett and Mortimer Sellers (online ed.)

2024c: ‘Stephen Gaukroger on philosophical failure’ in Science and the shaping of modernity: Essays in honor of Steven Gaukroger, ed. Charles Wolfe and Anik Waldrow, Cham, Switzerland, pp. 259-62.

2025: ‘J. G. A. Pocock: A Life in Letters’, Journal of the History of Ideas 86, 1, pp. 1-19.

== Books edited ==
1. (Co-editor and contributor), Philosophy, Politics and Society: Fourth Series, Basil Blackwell, Oxford, 1972. ISBN 978-0-631-14410-6

2. (Co-editor and contributor), Philosophy in History, Cambridge University Press, 1984. ISBN 978-0-521-27330-5

3. (Editor and contributor), The Return of Grand Theory in the Human Sciences, Cambridge University Press, 1985. ISBN 978-0-521-39833-6

4. (Co-editor and contributor), The Cambridge History of Renaissance Philosophy, Cambridge University Press, 1988. ISBN 978-0-521-25104-4

5(a). (Co-editor), Machiavelli, The Prince (trans. Russell Price), Cambridge University Press, 1988. ISBN 978-0-521-34993-2

5(b) (Editor), Machiavelli, The Prince (trans. Russell Price, with revisions by Quentin Skinner) Second Edition, Cambridge University Press, 2019. ISBN 978-1-107-14586-3

6. (Co-editor and contributor), Machiavelli and Republicanism, Cambridge University Press, 1990. ISBN 978-0-521-43589-5

7. (Co-editor and contributor), Political Discourse in Early-modern Britain, Cambridge University Press, 1993. ISBN 978-0-521-39242-6

8. (Co-editor) Milton and Republicanism, Cambridge University Press, 1995. ISBN 978-0-521-64648-2

9. (Co-editor and contributor), Republicanism: A Shared European Heritage; Volume I: Republicanism and Constitutionalism in Early Modern Europe, Cambridge University Press, 2002. ISBN 978-0-521-67235-1

10. (Co-editor and contributor), Republicanism: A Shared European Heritage; Volume II: The Values of Republicanism in Early Modern Europe, Cambridge University Press, 2002. ISBN 978-0-521-67234-4

11. (Co-editor and contributor), States and Citizens: History, Theory, Prospects, Cambridge University Press, 2003. ISBN 978-0-521-53926-5 (Translated into Chinese.)

12. (Co-editor), Thomas Hobbes: Writings on Common Law and Hereditary Right, Edited by Alan Cromartie and Quentin Skinner (The Clarendon Edition of the Works of Thomas Hobbes, Volume XI), The Clarendon Press, Oxford, 2005. ISBN 978-0-19-923623-7

13. (Co-editor and contributor) Sovereignty in Fragments: The Past, Present and Future of a Contested Concept, Cambridge University Press, 2010. ISBN 978-1-107-00004-9

14. (Editor) Families and States in Western Europe, Cambridge University Press 2011. ISBN 978-0-521-12801-8

15. (Co-editor) Freedom and the Construction of Europe Volume I: Religious Freedom and Civil Liberty, Cambridge University Press, 2013. ISBN 978-1-107-03306-1

16. (Co-editor) Freedom and the Construction of Europe Volume II: Free Persons and Free States, Cambridge University Press, 2013. ISBN 978-1-107-03307-8

17. (Co-editor) Popular sovereignty in historical perspective, Cambridge University Press, 2016. ISBN 978-1-107-13040-1

== Interviews ==
- 2000(a): 'Intervista a Quentin Skinner: Conseguire la libertà promuovere l'uguaglianza', Il pensiero mazziniano 3, pp. 118–22.
- 2000(b): 'Entrevista: Quentin Skinner' in As muitas faces da história, ed. Maria Lúcia Pallares-Burke, Brazilia, pp. 307–39 ISBN 978-85-7139-307-3 [Trans. in The New History: Confessions and Conversations, ed. Maria Lúcia Pallares-Burke, Cambridge, 2003 ISBN 978-0-7456-3021-2]
- 2001: 'Quentin Skinnerin haastattelu', Niin & Näin 31, pp. 8–23
- 2002: 'Encountering the Past: An Interview with Quentin Skinner', Finnish Yearbook of Political Thought [Redescriptions Yearbook of Political Thought, Conceptual History and Feminist Theory] 6, pp. 32–63
- 2003: 'La Libertà Politica ed il Mestiere dello Storico: Intervista a Quentin Skinner', Teoria Politica 19, pp. 177–85
- 2006: 'Historia intellectual y acción política: Una entrevista con Quentin Skinner', Historia y Política 16, pp. 237–58
- 2007(a): 'Neither text, nor context: An interview with Quentin Skinner', Groniek: Historisch Tijdschrift 174, pp. 117–33 ISBN 978-90-72918-66-6
- 2007(b): 'La Historia de mi Historia: Una Entrevista con Quentin Skinner', El giro contextual: Cinco ensayos de Quentin Skinner y seis comentarios, ed. Enrique Bocardo Crespo, Madrid, pp. 45–60.
- 2007(c): Sebastián, Javier Fernández. "Intellectual history, liberty and Republicanism: an interview with Quentin Skinner". Contributions to the History of Concepts. 3 (1): 102–123.
- 2009(a): 'Making History; The Discipline in Perspective: Interview with Professor Quentin Skinner', Storia e Politica 1, pp. 113–34.
- 2009(b): 'Wie frei sind wir wirklich?' Fragen an Quentin Skinner', Zeitschrift fűr Ideengeschichte 3, pp. 5–21.
- 2012(a): Prokhovnik, Raia (16 November 2012), "Approaching political theory historically: an interview with Quentin Skinner", in Browning, Gary; Dimova-Cookson, Maria; Prokhovnik, Raia (eds.), Dialogues with contemporary political theorists, Houndsmill, Basingstoke, Hampshire New York: Palgrave Macmillan, pp. 181–196, ISBN 9780230303058.
- 2012(b): Giannakopoulos, Georgios; Quijano, Francisco. "On politics and history: a discussion with Quentin Skinner" (PDF). Journal of Intellectual History and Political Thought. 1 (1): 7–31. Archived from the original (PDF) on 2 September 2014. See also Giannakopoulos, Georgios; Quijano, Francisco (June 2013). "Historia y política en perspectiva: entrevista a Quentin Skinner". Signos Filosóficos (in Spanish). 15 (29): 167–191. ISSN 1665-1324.
- 2013: 'An Interview with Professor Quentin Skinner' conducted by Jeng-Guo Chen and Carl Shaw, Intellectual History 2, pp. 239–62
- 2014: ‘Interview met Quentin Skinner’, Skript: Historisch Tijdschrift 36, pp. 245–52.
- 2016: "'Ideas in Context': Conversation with Quentin Skinner" by Hansong Li. Chicago Journal of History Vol. VII Autumn 2016.
- 2017(a): 'Idées, histoire et sciences sociales: Entretien avec Quentin Skinner' in Vers une histoire sociale des idées politiques, ed. Chloé Gaboriaux and Arnault Skornicke, pp. 93–110.
- 2017(b):‘Nous sommes peut-être beaucoup moins libre que nous le pensons’, Interview with Astrid von Busekist, translated by Mathieu Hauchecorne and Frédérique Matonti, Raisons politiques 67, pp.185-203.
- 2018: ‘What intellectual history teaches us’, Quentin Skinner interviewed by Professor Jeremy Jennings of King's College London.
- 2019: ‘Conversation with Quentin Skinner’ in Thinking in the Past Tense: eight conversations, ed. Alexander Bevilacqua and Frederick Clark, Chicago University Press, pp. 191–212. ISBN 978-0-226-60117-5
