= Robert Spaemann =

German Catholic philosopher (1927–2018)

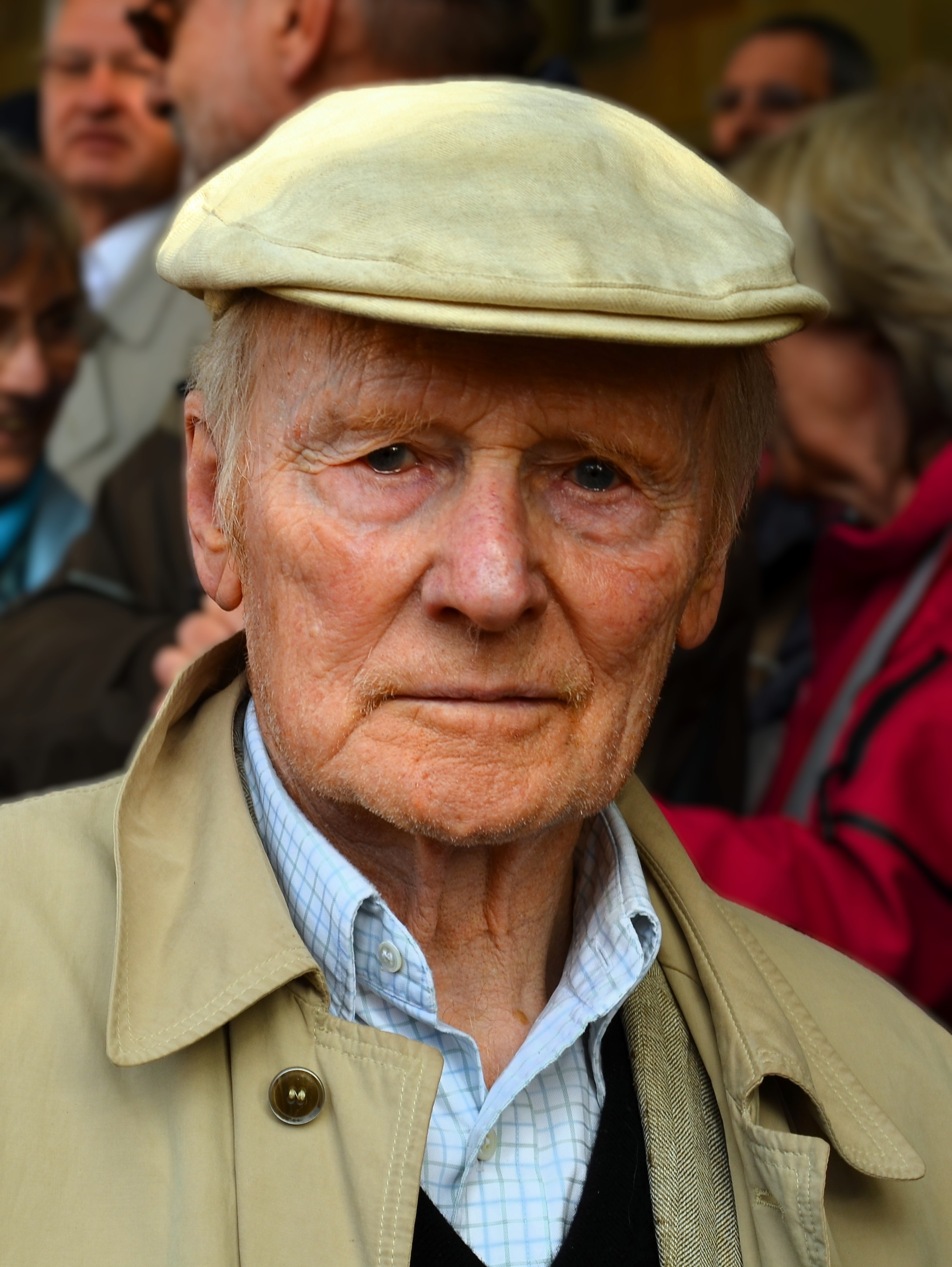
- Spaemann in 2015
- Born: 5 May 1927; Berlin, Free State of Prussia, Weimar Republic
- Died: 10 December 2018 (aged 91); Botnang, Stuttgart, Baden-Württemberg, Germany
- Spouse: Cordelia Steiner
- Children: 3
- Awards: Karl Jaspers Prize (2001)

Education
- Education: University of Münster (PhD); LMU Munich; University of Fribourg; University of Paris
- Thesis: Studien über de Bonald (1952)
- Doctoral advisor: Joachim Ritter

Philosophical work
- Era: Contemporary philosophy
- Region: Western philosophy
- School: Continental philosophy Ritter School
- Institutions: University of Stuttgart; Heidelberg University; LMU Munich; University of Salzburg
- Doctoral students: Walter Schweidler
- Notable students: Reinhart Maurer
- Main interests: Christian ethics, bioethics, natural law, philosophy of religion, political philosophy, philosophical anthropology
- Notable ideas: Argument from grammar

Signature
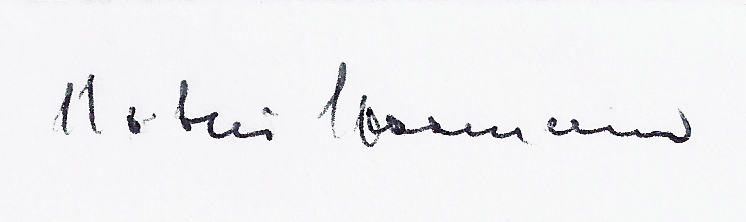

Robert Spaemann (5 May 1927 – 10 December 2018) was a German Catholic philosopher. He is considered a member of the Ritter School.

Spaemann's focus was on Christian ethics. He was known for his work in bioethics, ecology and human rights. Although not yet widely translated into languages other than his native German, Spaemann was internationally known, and his work was highly regarded by Pope Benedict XVI He was also a personal advisor of Pope John Paul II and a friend of Joseph Ratzinger.

== Life ==
Robert Spaemann was born in Berlin on 5 May 1927 to Heinrich Spaemann and Ruth Krämer. His parents originally had been radical atheists, but both entered the Catholic Church in 1930, and after his mother's early death, his father was ordained a Catholic priest in 1942.

Spaemann studied at the University of Münster, where in 1962, he was awarded his Habilitation. He was Professor of Philosophy at the University of Stuttgart (until 1968), at Heidelberg University (until 1972), and at LMU Munich, where he was made Emeritus Professor in 1992. He also became Honorary Professor at the University of Salzburg, and was awarded an honorary doctorate by the Catholic University of Lublin in 2012.

== Work ==
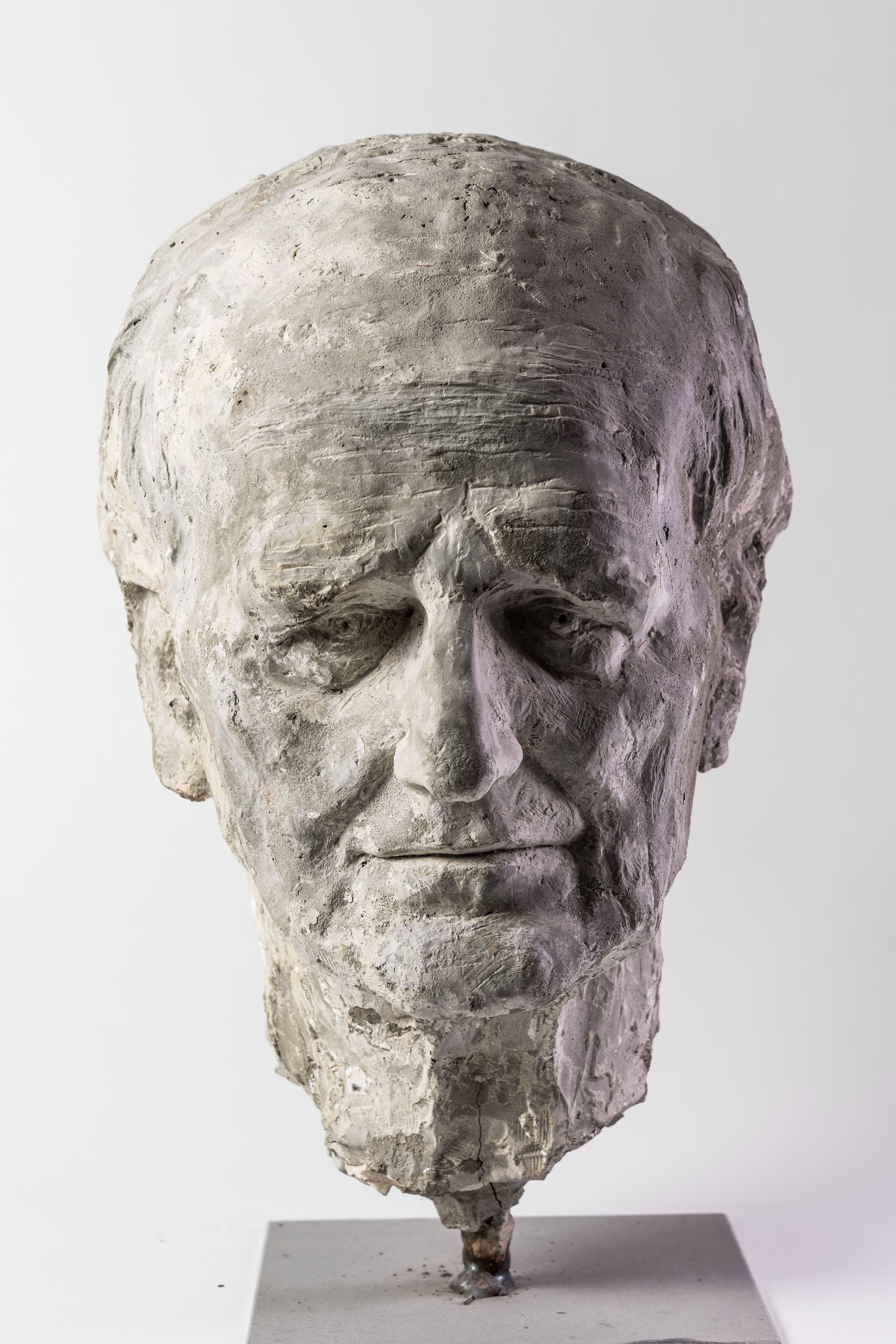
Sculpture of Spaemann by Wolfgang Eckert

Spaemann's three most important works are Reflexion und Spontaneität – Studien über Fénelon (1963 / 1990), Glück und Wohlwollen (transl. Happiness and Benevolence, 2000), and Personen (transl. Persons – The Difference between "Someone" and "Something", 2006).

In Happiness and Benevolence, Spaemann sets forth a thesis that happiness is derived from benevolent acting and that we are created by God as social beings to help one another find truth and meaning in an often confused and disordered world:

The paradigm of acting from benevolence is any action by which we come to the help of human life which requires this help...only when we are helped do we learn to help ourselves, that is, to enter into that indirect relationship with ourselves which is constitutive of for all rationality which is not strictly instrumental, [and instead] constitutive for all ethical practice."

He participated in the Ratzinger Circle of Alumni (Schülerkreis, a private conference with Joseph Ratzinger that was convened from the late 1970s).

=== Proof of God from grammar ===
In 2005, Spaemann published an article for the German newspaper Die Welt, arguing for the existence of God using the future perfect. The argument was:

1. The future perfect is connected to the present, because something happening now is equivalent to something having happened in the future.
2. Every truth is eternal in this sense, because the present always remains real as the past of the future present.
3. The reality of the past is in it being remembered. But at some point, there will be no more people on Earth to remember it.
4. Since the past is always the past of a present, it will vanish along with its present, if the present ceases to be remembered. Thus, the future perfect will lose its meaning.
5. When the present will one day no longer have been, it is not real at all. If the future perfect is eliminated, the present is, too.

He concludes: To preserve the reality of the present, there must be an absolute consciousness in which everything that happens is stored. That consciousness being God.

== Works ==
=== Books in English ===
- Basic Moral Concepts, trans. T.J. Armstrong. London: Routledge, 1990 (1982).
- Essays in Anthropology: Variations on a Theme, trans. Guido De Graaff and James Mumford. Eugene, OR: Cascade Books, 2010 (1987).
- Happiness and Benevolence, trans. J. Alberg. Edinburgh: T & T Clark, 2000 (1989).
- Persons: The Difference between "Someone" and "Something", trans. Oliver O’Donovan. Oxford: Oxford University Press, 2006 (1996).
- Love and the Dignity of Human Life: On Nature and Natural Law, Foreword by D. L. Schindler. Eerdmans Publishing Co.: Grand Rapids, Michigan, 2012.
- A Robert Spaemann Reader: Philosophical Essays on Nature, God, and the Human Person, ed. & trans. D.C. Schindler & Jeanne Heffernan Schindler. Oxford: Oxford University Press, 2015.

=== Articles in English ===
- "Remarks on the Problem of Equality," Ethics 87 (1976–77), 363-69.
- "Side-effects as a Moral Problem," trans. Frederick S. Gardiner, Contemporary German Philosophy, vol. 2, ed. Darrel E. Christensen, Manfred Riedel, Robert Spaemann, Reiner Wiehl, Wolfgang Wieland (University Park: Pennsylvania State University Press, 1983), 138-51.
- "Remarks on the Ontology of 'Right' and 'Left,'" Graduate Faculty Philosophy Journal 10.1 (1984), 89-97.
- "Is Every Human Being a Person?," trans. Richard Schenk, O.P., The Thomist 60 (1996), 463-74.
- "Rationality and Faith in God," trans. D.C. Schindler, Communio: International Catholic Review 32.4 (Winter 2005), 618-636.
- "When Death Becomes Inhuman," trans. Adrian J. Walker, Communio: International Catholic Review 33.2 (Summer 2006), 298-300.
- "Begotten, Not Made," trans. Michelle K. Borras, Communio: International Catholic Review 33.2 (Summer 2006), 290-297.
- with Holger Zabrowski, "An Animal That Can Promise and Forgive," trans. Lesley Rice, Communio: International Catholic Review 34.4 (Winter 2007), 511-521.
- "How Could You Do What You Did?," trans. Lesley M. Rice, Communio: International Catholic Review 36.4 (Winter 2009), 643-651.
- "Is Brain Death the Death of a Human Person?," Communio: International Catholic Review 38.2 (Summer 2011), 326-340.
- "The Courage to Educate," Communio: International Catholic Review 40.1 (Spring 2013), 48–63.

=== Books in German ===
- Rousseau – Mensch oder Bürger. Das Dilemma der Moderne. Klett-Cotta, Stuttgart 2008, ISBN 978-3-608-94245-3
- Der letzte Gottesbeweis. Pattloch Verlag 2007, ISBN 978-3-629-02178-6
- Das unsterbliche Gerücht. Die Frage nach Gott und der Aberglaube der Moderne. Klett-Cotta, Stuttgart 2005, ISBN 3-608-94452-4. Neuausgabe als: Natürliche Ziele. Klett-Cotta, Stuttgart 2005, ISBN 3-608-94121-5
- Natürliche Ziele. Geschichte und Wiederentdeckung des teleologischen Denkens. Stuttgart: Klett-Cotta, 2005, ISBN 3-608-94121-5
- Grenzen. Zur ethischen Dimension des Handelns. Klett-Cotta, Stuttgart 2001, ISBN 3-608-91027-1
- Der Ursprung der Soziologie aus dem Geist der Restauration. Studien über Louise-Gabriel de Bonald. Kösel, München 1959; 2. A. Klett-Cotta, Stuttgart 1998, ISBN 3-608-91921-X
- Töten oder sterben lassen? Worum es in der Euthanasiedebatte geht. (Mit Thomas Fuchs). Herder Verlag 1997
- Personen. Versuche über den Unterschied zwischen „etwas“ und „jemand“. Klett-Cotta, Stuttgart 1996, ISBN 3-608-91813-2
- Zur kirchlichen Erbsündenlehre. Stellungnahmen zu einer brennenden Frage. (Mit Albert Görres, Christoph Schönborn). (Sammlung Kriterien 87), Johannes Verlag Einsiedeln Freiburg 1994, ISBN 3-89411-303-0
- Reflexion und Spontanität – Studien über Fénelon. Kohlhammer Verlag, Stuttgart 1963; 2. A. Klett-Cotta, Stuttgart 1990, ISBN 3-608-91334-3
- Glück und Wohlwollen. Versuch über Ethik. Klett-Cotta, Stuttgart 1989, ISBN 3-608-91556-7
- Das Natürliche und Vernünftige. Aufsätze zur Anthropologie. Piper Verlag (Serie Piper 702), München 1987, 3-492-10702-8
- Philosophische Essays. Reclam (UB 7961), Stuttgart 1983; 2., erw. A. ebd. 1994, ISBN 3-15-007961-6
- Moralische Grundbegriffe. Beck Verlag (Beck’sche Reihe 256), München 1982, ISBN 3-406-45442-9
- Rousseau – Bürger ohne Vaterland. Von der Polis zur Natur. Piper Verlag, München 1980, ISBN 3-492-10579-3
- Einsprüche. Christliche Reden. Johannes Verlag Einsiedeln Freiburg 1977, ISBN 3-265-10195-9
- Die Frage Wozu? Geschichte und Wiederentdeckung des teleologischen Denkens. (Mit Reinhard Löw). Piper (Serie Piper 748), München 1981
- Zur Kritik der politischen Utopie. Zehn Kapitel politischer Philosophie. Klett-Cotta, Stuttgart 1977, ISBN 3-12-910110-1

=== Articles in German ===
- Hermann Lübbe (Hrsg.): Wozu Philosophie? Stellungnahmen eines Arbeitskreises. De Gruyter, Berlin 1978, ISBN 3-11-007513-X.
- Robert Spaemann: Die christliche Religion und das Ende des modernen Bewusstseins. In: Internationale Katholische Zeitschrift Communio. Nr. 3. 1979, S. 256f.
- Robert Spaemann: Bestialische Quälereien Tag für Tag. In: Deutsche Zeitung. 33, 1979. Auch veröffentlicht unter: Welt des Grauens. In: Kritik der Tierversuche. Kübler Verlag, Lambertheim 1980, ISBN 3-921265-24-X, S. 27-31.
- Peter Thomas Geach, Fernando Inciarte, Robert Spaemann: Persönliche Verantwortung. Adamas, Köln 1982, ISBN 3-920007-78-6.
- Robert Spaemann: Tierschutz und Menschenwürde. In: Ursula M. Händel (Hrsg.): Tierschutz - Testfall unserer Menschlichkeit. Fischer Taschenbuchverlag GmbH, Frankfurt am Main 1984, ISBN 3-596-24265-7, S. 71–81.
- Robert Spaemann, Wolfgang Welsch, Walther Christoph Zimmerli: Zweckmässigkeit und menschliches Glück. Fränkischer Tag, Bamberg 1994, ISBN 3-928648-12-8.
- Oswald Georg Bauer (Red.): Was heißt „wirklich“? Unsere Erkenntnis zwischen Wahrnehmung und Wissenschaft. Oreos, Waakirchen-Schaftlach 2000, ISBN 3-923657-54-4.
- Walter Schweidler (Hrsg.): Menschenleben – Menschenwürde. Interdisziplinäres Symposium zur Bioethik. Lit, Münster 2003, ISBN 3-8258-6808-7.
- Georg Muschalek (Hrsg.): Der Widerstand gegen die Alte Messe. Van Seth, Denkendorf 2007, ISBN 978-3-927057-16-6.
- Robert Spaemann: Die schlechte Lehre vom guten Zweck. Der korrumpierende Kalkül hinter der Schein-Debatte. In: FAZ vom 23. Oktober 1999, Bilder und Zeiten I.
