= The Atheopagan Society =

Non-profit religious organization

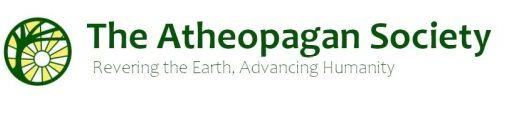
- Abbreviation: TAPS
- Type: Neopaganism
- Classification: New religious movement
- Orientation: Secular paganism
- Theology: Atheism
- Headquarters: Santa Rosa, California
- Founder: Mark A. Green
- Origin: August 5, 2012; 13 years ago
- Tax status: Exempt
- Official website: theapsocietyorg.wordpress.com

The Atheopagan Society is an online non-profit religious organization dedicated to the non-theistic form of neopaganism defined by founder Mark Alexander Green.

The society is a new religious movement rooted in environmentalism, egalitarianism, feminism, anti-racism, and anti-capitalism, offering a type of godless paganism. Followers identify as atheopagans.

== History ==
The Atheopagan Society was founded by Mark A. Green, an atheist, activist, poet, musician and writer, on August 5, 2012. Green is an atheist who first envisioned a non-theistic form of neopaganism in 2005. Green wrote a 2009 essay that outlined the fundamental beliefs, subsequently elaborated in his 2019 book Atheopaganism: An Earth-honoring Path Rooted in Science.

== Logo ==
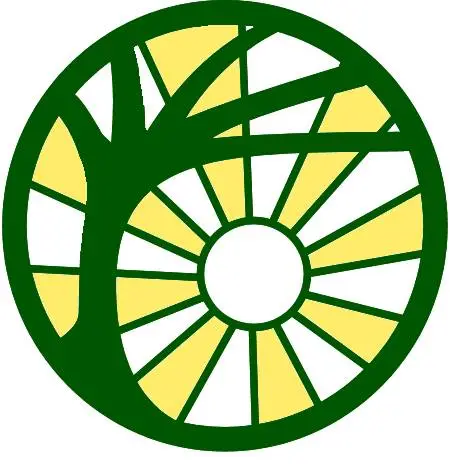
Symbol of atheopaganism

The Atheopagan Suntree is the logo of the religion and society. It features a green five-branched tree against an eight-rayed yellow sun. The eight rays represent the holidays on the Wheel of the Year and the five branches represent how five in addition to eight make thirteen which represents the 13 Atheopagan Principles. Various symbols were submitted for a contest to decide which logo would represent the religion such as, a combination of the pentacle and the atom symbol, nautilus shells, and a combination of the pentacle with the letter A. The logo was chosen in August 2018.

== Beliefs and practices ==
=== Ethics and principles ===
Atheopaganism follows ethics and principles called the 13 Atheopagan Principles which are:

1. Skepticism - I understand that the metaphorical is not the literal
2. Reverence - I honor the Earth which produced and sustains humanity.
3. Gratitude - I am grateful.
4. Humility - I am humble
5. Perspective - I laugh a lot...including at myself.
6. Praxis - I enact regular ritual in observance of my religion.
7. Inclusiveness - I celebrate diversity and am respectful of difference.
8. Legacy - I recognize and embrace my responsibility to the young and future generations.
9. Responsibility - I acknowledge that freedom is tempered by responsibility.
10. Pleasure Positive - I celebrate pleasure as inherently good so long as others are not harmed in its pursuit
11. Curiosity - I understand that knowledge is never complete. There is always more to be learned.
12. Integrity - I conduct myself with integrity in word and deed.
13. Kindness and compassion - I practice kindness and compassion with others and myself, recognizing that they and I will not always meet the standards set by these principles.

The religion also has the Four Pillars of Atheopaganism which are Life, Truth, Beauty, and Love. Instead of dogmatic belief, the principles are meant to be guides.

=== Holidays ===
The holidays that are celebrated are Riverain, Beltane, Yule, Brightening, High Spring, May Day, Midsummer, Summer's Waning, Harvest, and Hallows. The holidays are flexible and can be modified by atheopagans.

=== Magic ===
Magic is practiced not as a supernatural power but as a psychological technique defined as "the manipulation of consciousness according to desired outcomes," made to change attitudes, emotions, and behaviors. It may include the use of magic symbols and sigils. Sigils are used to invoke a specific meaning for the practitioner.

=== Metaphors ===
While not inherently part of the religion, deities may be used as metaphors by atheopagans.

=== Rituals ===
Atheopagans believe in overlap between pagan rituals and modern science.
