= Günter Rohrmoser =

German social philosopher (1927–2008)

Günter Rohrmoser (29 November 1927 – 15 September 2008) was a German Christian social philosopher and professor at the Hohenheim University and at Stuttgart University. He was an advisor to prominent Christian Democratic Union politicians.

== Life ==
Rohrmoser was born in Bochum. He studied philosophy, theology, history and economics at Münster University. One of his eminent professors at Münster was Joachim Ritter and he became a follower of the German post war "Ritter school" of conservative philosophers. He wrote his habilitation (post-doctoral qualification) at Cologne University on the philosophy of Hegel.

From 1976 until 1996 he taught as a professor for social philosophy at Hohenheim University near Stuttgart. He became a vocal critic of the neo-Marxist "critical philosophy", the Frankfurter Schule (especially Jürgen Habermas) and the New Left of the generation of 1968. He wrote more than twenty books. Some of them have been translated into Japanese and Russian. He was awarded honors by the Russian Academy of Sciences and the Chinese Academy of Sciences.

Rohrmoser's library is now part of Library of Conservatism of the Neue Rechte Förderstiftung Konservative Bildung und Forschung.

Rohrmoser died on 15 September 2008 in Stuttgart at the age of 80.

== Political advisor ==
Initially, Rohrmoser was close to the Social Democrats and was a member of several commissions of the party, but then he moved to the right and became a supporter and advisor to Christian Democratic Union and Christian Social Union, in particular Bavarian politician Franz Josef Strauss and the Baden-Württemberg prime minister Hans Filbinger. Later he became increasingly disillusioned with the CDU chancellor Helmut Kohl whom he accused of not achieving a true conservative moral change of tides. In 1997 he received the "Bundesverdienstkreuz", the Order of Merit of the Federal Republic of Germany.
