= In Praise of Polytheism =

Essay by Odo Marquard

"In Praise of Polytheism – On Monomythical and Polymythical Thinking" (German: Lob des Polytheismus. Über Monomythie und Polymythie) is an essay by the German philosopher Odo Marquard, which was held as a lecture at Technische Universität Berlin in 1978. It was first published in 1979 in an anthology, and was published again in 1981 in Marquard's book Farewell to Matters of Principle (German: Abschied vom Prinzipiellen).

The essay posits that monotheism and the Enlightenment are based on "monomythical thinking", meaning that they only allow one story. It also posits that the separation of powers and the individual have their origin in polytheism, and argues that people should embrace what Marquard calls "enlightened polymythical thinking"—the recognition of several stories in the modern world. Marquard was a professor of philosophy and proponent of scepticism and pluralism. He belonged to a part of German philosophy that viewed the issues of modernity through political theology, which associates modern political concepts with theological concepts. Some of the points in the essay have precursors in the writings of Max Weber, Erik Peterson and Friedrich Nietzsche.

"In Praise of Polytheism" has provoked discussion and controversy in Germany. An early critic was Jacob Taubes, who associated its views with far-right politics. Several humanities scholars and theologians have responded to the essay by questioning its statements about polytheism, the individual, and pluralism.

== Background ==
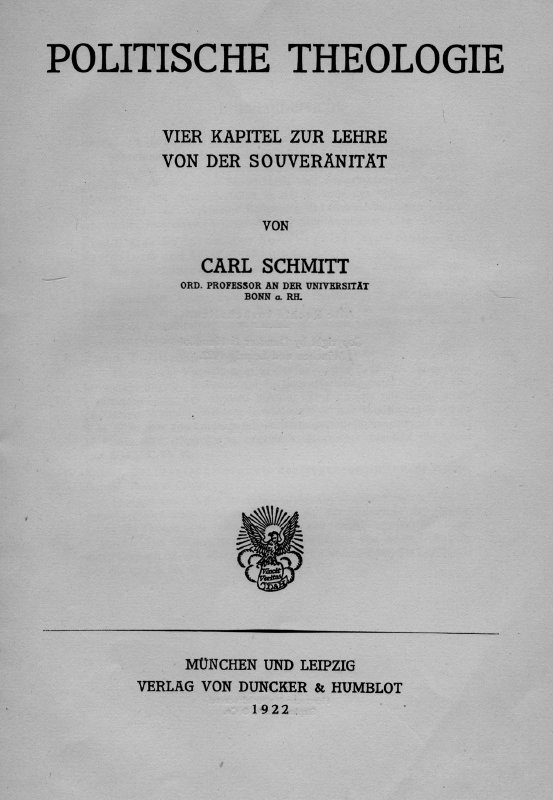
Carl Schmitt's 1922 book Political Theology posits that modern political concepts are secularised theology.

Several German-speaking philosophers in the 20th century addressed concerns about meaning in the contemporary world by discussing modernity in religious terms. They were inspired by the secularisation theorem associated with Carl Schmitt and Karl Löwith, which posits that there is a continuity between theology and secular politics or science. Schmitt discussed this under the label of political theology, which he summarised by writing that "all significant concepts of the modern theory of the state are secularized theological concepts".

The philosophers engaged in these discussions varied in their approaches and solutions to the problems they identified. Jacob Taubes and Gershom Scholem viewed the ancient Gnostic worldview as a precedent for modern nihilism, and embraced it; especially Taubes, who initiated discussions about modernity and Gnosticism with his book Occidental Eschatology (1947), identified as a modern Gnostic, considered the world to be illegitimate, and wished to see it end in an apocalyptic destruction. Schmitt, Eric Voegelin, Hans Jonas, Hans Blumenberg and Odo Marquard, on the other hand, wanted to legitimise the world as it is and overcome the Gnostic rejection of the world.

Marquard (1928–2015) was a professor of philosophy at the University of Giessen. He thought it was crucial to recognise human finitude, promoted philosophical scepticism and pluralism, and opposed the absolutism found in German idealism. He was against the search for first principles and foundational philosophies, because he was convinced they inevitably end up in conflict with a reality that will fail to meet their demands. Without a monopolistic power in the form of a founding principle, Marquard thought the individual will be able to live in contingency and in freedom, because there is a plurality of possibilities.

Marquard believed a lack of meaning in the modern world had resulted in cultural and intellectual decay, and that the solution was to rediscover systems of meaning from the ancient world, notably polytheism. His intellectual combination of modernity and polytheism was preceded by the sociologist Max Weber, who in the 1910s had written that life in the modern world, with its different choices and ultimate subordination to fate, could be understood as a form of disenchanted polytheism. Weber wrote that this situation made ancient Greece a suitable place to look for models for a modern way of life. Another precursor was the Christian theologian Erik Peterson, who had discussed the possibility of polytheism as a political theology in his essay "Monotheism as a Political Problem" (1935). Marquard adopted Friedrich Nietzsche's view that the end of religious monotheism marked the beginning of modernity.

== Summary ==
Marquard's essay "In Praise of Polytheism" argues that human consciousness has never undergone a process of demythologisation. The author fundamentally agrees with Claude Lévi-Strauss', Blumenberg's and Leszek Kołakowski's positions on myths, and writes that the story of demythologisation is itself a myth. Marquard argues that myths are stories, and not primitive precursors to knowledge; knowledge is about finding truths, and storytelling is how humans engage with known truths in their lifeworld. From this he concludes that new knowledge will only lead to new myths. He compares the changing of myths to the changing of clothes and writes that the Enlightenment was not a "striptease"; "mythonudism" is not possible.

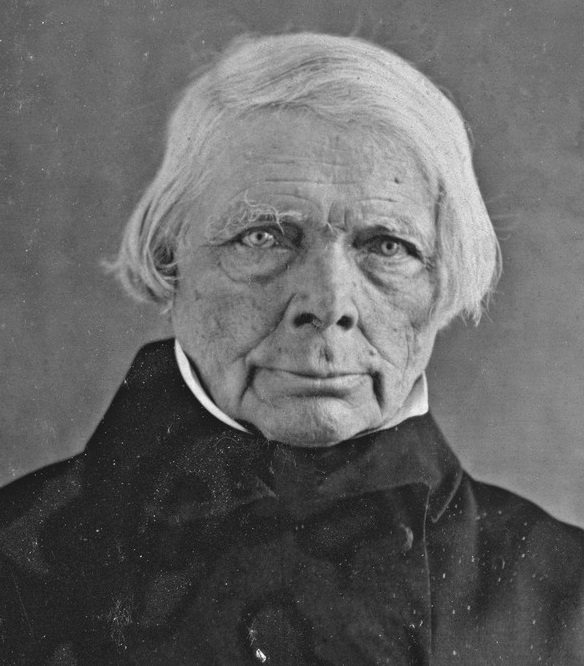
According to Marquard, F. W. J. Schelling coined the term "new mythology" in "The Oldest Systematic Program of German Idealism", but showed an uneasiness with the myth of progress in his late works.

The essay posits that myths can be harmful or wholesome: monomythical thinking—allowing only one story—is harmful because it causes narrative atrophy; conversely, polymythical thinking is a separation of powers, where different stories keep each other in check and the "manifoldness" of each individual can exist. According to Marquard, the chief example of a monomyth is that of world history as progress toward emancipation. This myth emerged in the mid-18th century philosophy of history and turned "histories" into the singular "history". Marquard calls it the second end of polymythical thinking; the first was the end of religious polytheism. Although the Christian Trinity may be polytheistic, the salvation story is monotheistic and ends in nominalistic "storylessness".

The emancipation story, writes Marquard, emerged as a failed attempt to secularise the salvation story. Like its precursor, it is a story about how humans will cease to be subject to myths, but eventually became a new mythology itself. After the new mythology emerged, an uneasiness about the monomyth began to show. It expressed itself as an increased interest in the exotic, which included classical antiquity, orientalism, and the Germanic mythology in Richard Wagner's works. In his contemporary West, Marquard regards Maoism, tourism, and structural ethnology as examples of the same "mythological orientalism". Marquard argues that this countermovement never will offer a solution, because it merely submits exotic mythology to the monomyth of progress and thereby confirms its domination.

Marquard says the true solution is "enlightened polymythical thinking": the modern world began when monotheism was disenchanted, which also led to the "disenchanted return of polytheism" in the form of the political separation of powers and the reemergence of the individual; the latter had existed under the separation of powers of ancient polytheism, before it was formulated under the threat from monotheism. Marquard believes when people recognise that myths are stories, it becomes possible to identify modern polymythical thinking, which exists in fields like the scientific study of history and in novels. For philosophy to break with the monomyth, he argues, it must allow dissent and tell stories again, defying charges of relativism and scepticism.

== Publication history ==
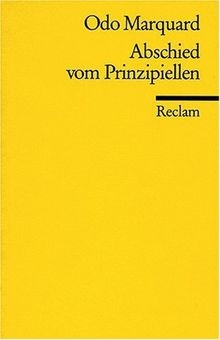
German cover of Farewell to Matters of Principle

Marquard gave "In Praise of Polytheism" as a lecture at Technische Universität Berlin on 31 January 1978 as part of the colloquium Philosophie und Mythos (lit. 'Philosophy and myth'). It appeared as an essay in a 1979 anthology named after the colloquium, published by Walter de Gruyter. It was included in Marquard's essay collection Farewell to Matters of Principle (German: Abschied vom Prinzipiellen), which was published in German by Reclam in 1981 and translated into English by Robert M. Wallace in 1989 through the Oxford University Press. It was selected for Zukunft braucht Herkunft (transl. 'The future needs a past'), published by Reclam in 2003 as a collection of Marquard's most important texts.

Marquard continued his arguments in the text "Aufgeklärter Polytheismus—auch eine politische Theologie?" (lit. 'Enlightened polytheism—also a political theology?') which was published in a 1983 anthology about the legacy of Schmitt. He discussed his views on polytheism as a requisite for freedom and individuality in the 1988 essay "Sola divisione individuum—Betrachtung über Individuum und Gewaltenteilung" (lit. 'Individual by separation alone—considerations on the individual and separation of powers'), which was presented at the 13th colloquium of the research group Poetik und Hermeneutik. (Note: "Sola divisione individuum" was published in Frank, Manfred; Haverkamp, Anselm, eds. (1988). Individualität (in German). Munich: Wilhelm Fink Verlag. pp. 21–34. ISBN 978-3-7705-2474-7. It also appears in Marquard, Odo (2004). Individuum und Gewaltenteilung (in German). Stuttgart: Reclam. pp. 68–90. ISBN 978-3-15-018306-9.)

== Reception ==
"In Praise of Polytheism" is cited in many German philosophical works but has been at the centre of discussion and controversy. According to Burkhard Gladigow, the opposition it faced became intense because Marquard proposed polytheism as a political solution. Gladigow wrote that the strong reaction to the subject resulted from a eurocentric and academic perspective, because among the world's population, only a minority adheres to nominally monotheistic religions. Within even those religions, monotheism is only one of several elements that inform the religious practice.

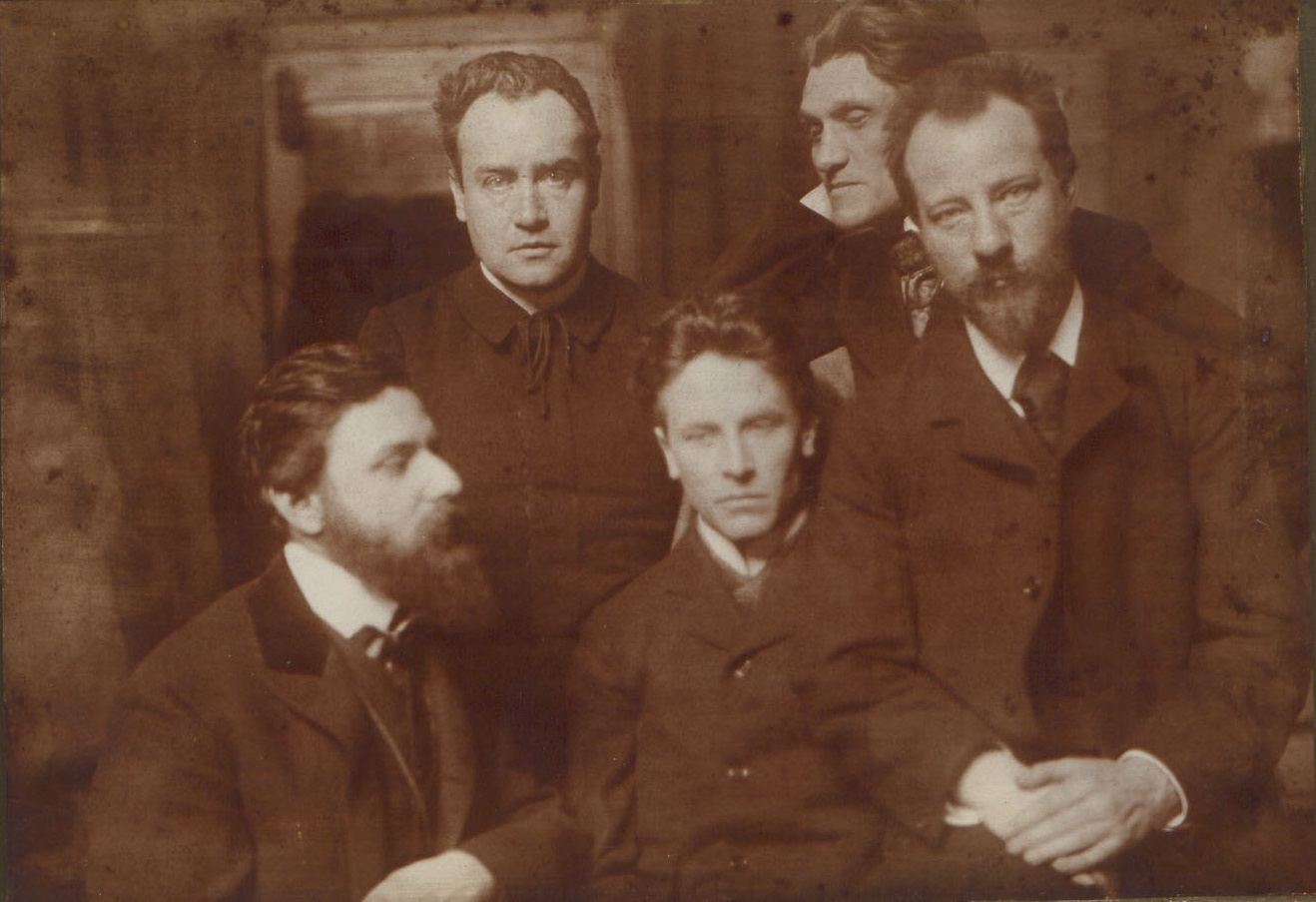
Jacob Taubes likened the views in the essay to those of the Kosmiker group (pictured from left to right: Karl Wolfskehl, Alfred Schuler, Ludwig Klages, Stefan George and Albert Verwey).

In 1983, Taubes published a response to "In Praise of Polytheism" where he wrote that Marquard should ask himself if he had not outlined a "philosophical choreography" for present-day "Kosmiker"; (Note: Original quotation: "Odo Marquard wird sich fragen [lassen] müssen, ob sein spätes 'Lob des Polytheismus' die philosophische Choreographie skizziert, nach der jene akademisierten 'Kosmiker' in der Bundesrepublik und in Frankreich sich in Szene setzen können.") with this he referred to a group of mystics and neopagans with blood and soil tendencies, active in Munich at the turn of the 20th century. Taubes said the essay produces a mythical mindset rather than describes one, (Note: Original quotation: "...nicht nur eine mythische Geisteslage indiziert, sondern produziert [wird]...") and that "recourses to myth post Christum are really just repetitions of Julian's apostasy". (Note: Original quotation: "Die Rekurse auf Mythos post Christum sind in Wahrheit nur Wiederholungen der Apostasie Julians.") He connected Marquard's project to Alain de Benoist's book On Being a Pagan (1981) and thereby associated it with the neopaganism of the far-right Nouvelle Droite movement in France.

Taubes dismissed the idea that polytheism is the seed to the individual and the separation of powers. He pointed to the neo-Kantian philosopher Hermann Cohen, who argued that the ego or soul originated with a development away from the "mythico-tragic view" of polytheism, and that this can be observed in Ezekiel 18. Richard Faber, a sociologist working in the tradition of the Frankfurt School, critiqued "In Praise of Polytheism" in 2007 and also rejected Marquard's argument about polytheism. Faber described the polytheism of ancient Greece as a self-destructive "oligotheism"—a theological oligarchy—that was destined to fail, and wrote that "pluralism has long become integralism (or rather: corporatism)".

Faber compared "In Praise of Polytheism" to Blumenberg's book Work on Myth (1979) and wrote that Marquard, by openly embracing polytheism as political pluralism, "explicates what Blumenberg only implies". In 2016, Stefanie von Schnurbein grouped Marquard's essay with texts written by Botho Strauß and Martin Walser in the 1990s. (Note: The texts in question are Strauß' 1993 essay "Anschwellender Bocksgesang" and Walser's 1998 essay "Ich vertraue. Querfeldein".) She wrote that the three authors share a "post-modern, post-structuralist and post-colonial impulse, which posits a logic of difference against a unifying, colonializing logic of sameness". Due to the nationalist implications of Strauß' and Walser's texts, Schnurbein wrote that "Taubes' early critique of Marquard is not as far-fetched or one-sided as it might have seemed at the moment of its publication in 1983".

From a Christian perspective, the Roman Catholic theologian Alois Halbmayr wrote his 1998 doctoral dissertation as a response to Marquard's writings about polytheism and monotheism. (Note: The dissertation was defended in 1998 and published as a book in 2000.) Halbmayr argued that the separation of powers that Marquard requests can be found in the Christian concept of the Trinity, and that Marquard engages in wishful thinking when he presents polytheism as a guarantee for freedom. Halbmayr called for resumed critical discussions about hope and ethics within the theology and philosophy of history, where the separation of powers should be kept in mind. The Lutheran theologian Klaus Koch wrote that "In Praise of Polytheism" is written in a "noble-philosophical diction" with the effect that "you don't know to what extent the matter is meant as serious", or if Marquard had been inebriated when he conceived it. (Note: Original quotation: "...in vornehm-philosophischer Diktion wie etwa bei Odo Marquard, bei der man nicht weiß, inwieweit die Sache ernst gemeint oder einer Weinlaune entsprungen ist.")

== See also ==
- Criticism of rationalism
- Religious pluralism
- Secular paganism
