= Walter Schweidler =

German philosopher (born 1957)

Walter Rudolf Schweidler (born 15 September 1957) is a German philosopher.

== Life ==
Since 2009, Schweidler has occupied the chair for philosophy at Catholic University of Eichstätt-Ingolstadt; having previously taught philosophy at Ruhr University Bochum, Technical University of Dortmund, and Teachers' College of Weingarten (PH Weingarten). He is a student of Robert Spaemann, and was his assistant from 1985 to 1992 at LMU Munich, where he completed graduate and postgraduate studies in philosophy, Catholic theology, political science and law. His master’s thesis on Wittgenstein’s concept of philosophy was published in 1983 (since translated into Italian), his doctoral dissertation, Die Überwindung der Metaphysik (The Overcoming of Metaphysics) in 1987 (since translated into Japanese and French), and his habilitation thesis Geistesmacht und Menschenrecht (Intellectual Power and Human Rights) in 1994.

Schweidler has lectured extensively abroad in the English-speaking world, with visiting professorships and research stays at the University of Minnesota, Macquarie University, the University of California at Berkeley (Graduate Theological Union), Manoa University in Honolulu and Loyola Marymount University.

== Work ==
In his dissertation supervised by Robert Spaemann, Die Überwindung der Metaphysik, Schweidler deals with the distinction between metaphysical and philosophical thinking. In four paradigmatic investigations of the metaphysical critiques of Rudolf Carnap, Oswald Spengler, Ludwig Wittgenstein and Martin Heidegger, he elaborates the characteristics of what he refers to as philosophical intellectual power.

Issuing from his lecturing activity in the area of practical, particularly political philosophy, his book Der gute Staat (The Good State) was published in 2002. A book similarly directed toward practical philosophical concerns, Über Menschenwürde (On Human Dignity), was published in 2012. A further common denominator in Schweidler’s work is the topic of time, in respect to which a systematic collection of his individual works in this area, made over several decades, was published as Das Uneinholbare (The Unattainable) in 2008. Further subjects and areas of research on which Schweidler has published concern contemporary and modern approaches to ethics and political philosophy, the philosophy of law and the theory of human rights, phenomenology, the philosophy of Heidegger in the context of the main currents of the 20th century, metaphysics and the critique of metaphysics; intercultural philosophy and bioethics. The question of what philosophy and what philosophical thought is persists as a recurrent theme in many of his works.

Besides a series on phenomenology, edited together with Jean-Luc Marion, Schweidler is the editor of a series devoted to the East/West exchange of philosophical ideas, West-östliche Denkwege (West-Eastern Pathways of Thinking).

== Honors and awards ==
In 2006, Schweidler received the German Schoolbook Prize for the work edited together with Robert Spaemann, Ethik: Lehr- und Lesebuch (Ethics: A Primer). He is a council member of the International Society for the Study of Time, a corresponding member of the Pontifical Academy for Life and a Knight of the Order of the Holy Sepulchre.

== Contributions (in English) ==
- "On the Ontological Status of Trust: Robert Spaemann's Philosophy of the Person as a Promise", in Trust: A Philosophical Approach (= Studies in Applied Philosophy, Epistemology and Rational Ethics, vol. 54), ed. Adriano Fabris (Cham: Springer Nature, 2020), 113-122.
- "Time’s Redeeming Urgency", in Time’s Urgency, ed. Carlos Montemayor and Robert Daniel (Leiden: Brill, 2019), 291-301.
- "Wittgenstein, Goethe, and the Metonymic Principle", in Wittgenstein, Philosopher of Cultures, ed. Carl Humphries and Walter Schweidler (Sankt Augustin: Academia, 2017), 103-114.
- "Heideggers 'Dao'", in Transcending Boundaries, ed. Walter Schweidler (Sankt Augustin: Academia, 2015), 13-63.
- "The Culture of Life and its Reasons", in Per una Cultura dell'Amore, ed. Marcello Pera, Marek Jedraszewski and Walter Schweidler (Sienna: Edizioni Cantagalli, 2015), 129-247.
- "The Self-Repeating Origin: Ontological Aspects of Ricoeur's Concept of Hermeneutics", in Hermeneutics and The Philosophy of Religion: The Legacy of Paul Ricoeur, ed. Ingo Dalferth and Marlene Block (Heidelberg: Mohr Siebeck, 2015), 81-95.
- "On the Social Origin of Time in Language", in Origins and Futures: Time Inflected and Reflected, ed. Raji C. Steineck and Claudia Clausius (Leiden: Brill, 2013), 37-48.
- "What is Good Politics", in Politics and Ethics, ed. S. Jigang, S. Jing and W. Jung (Peking: 2007), 1-10.
- "Between Norms and Utility: On the Cultural Differences in the Background of Human Rights", in Die USA als historisch-politische und kulturelle Herausforderung: Vermittlungsversuche (The USA as Historico-Political and Cultural Challenge : Attempts at Mediation), ed. A. Hauler, W. Kremp, and S. Popp (Trier: Wissenschafts-Verlag Trier, 2003), 87-95.
- "European Cultural Identity: A Culture of Norms or Culture of Utility?", in Actas del VI Congreso de Cultura Europea, Pamplona, 25–28 October 2002, ed. E. B. y Beatriz Elío (Navarra: Thomson Aranzadi, 2002), 417-424.
- "Wittgenstein's Anti-Cartesianism", in Wittgenstein – Eine Neubewertung, Akten des Internationalen Wittgenstein-Symposiums Kirchberg am Wechsel 1989, ed. R. Haller and J. Brandl (Vienna: Hölder-Pichler-Tempsky, 1990), 226-230.

== Books (in German) ==
- Kleine Einführung in die Angewandte Ethik (Berlin: Springer, 2018).
- Über Menschenwürde: Der Ursprung der Person und die Kultur des Lebens. Series Das Bild vom Menschen und die Ordnung der Gesellschaft (VS Verlag, 2012). Chinese translation: 論人的尊嚴：人格的本源與生命的文化 (Beijing: 人民出版社, 2017).
- Das Uneinholbare: Beiträge zu einer indirekten Metaphysik (Freiburg-Munich: Alber, 2008).
- Der gute Staat: Politische Ethik von Platon bis zur Gegenwart (Stuttgart: Reclam, 2004; 2nd ed. Berlin: Springer, 2014).
- Das Unantastbare: Beiträge zur Philosophie der Menschenrechte (Münster: LIT, 2001).
- Geistesmacht und Menschenrecht: Der Universalanspruch der Menschenrechte und das Problem der Ersten Philosophie (Freiburg-Munich: Alber, 1994).
- Die Überwindung der Metaphysik: Zu einem Ende der neuzeitlichen Philosophie (Stuttgart: Klett-Cotta, 1987). Japanese translation: 形而上学の克服―近代哲学の終焉について (Kyoto: 出版社, 2012). French translation: Au-delà de la métaphysique (Paris: Herrmann, 2015).
- Wittgensteins Philosophiebegriff (Freiburg-Munich: Alber, 1983). Italian translation: Il concetto di filosofia in Wittgenstein (Florence: Le Cáriti Editore, 2005).
