= Archiv für Begriffsgeschichte =

- Discipline: Philosophy
- Language: German
- Edited by: Christian Bermes, Hubertus Busche, Michael Erler

Publication details
- History: 1955–present
- Publisher: Meiner Verlag für Philosophie
- Frequency: Annually

Standard abbreviations
- ISO 4: Arch. Begr.

Indexing
- ISSN: 0003-8946
- LCCN: 2009219004
- JSTOR: 00038946
- OCLC no.: 958711883

Links
- Journal homepage

The Archiv für Begriffsgeschichte ("Archives of conceptual history") is an annual peer-reviewed academic journal covering studies on concepts of the history of philosophy and science. It was established in 1955 by Erich Rothacker and the current editors-in-chief are Christian Bermes (University of Koblenz-Landau), Hubertus Busche (University of Hagen), and Michael Erler (University of Würzburg). Former editors include Hans-Georg Gadamer, Joachim Ritter, Karlfried Gründer, Ulrich Dierse, and Gunter Scholtz. Articles are published in German, with abstracts in English.

== Abstracting and indexing ==
The journal is abstracted and indexed in Academic Search Premier, International Bibliography of Periodical Literature, L'Année philologique, Modern Language Association Database, and the Philosopher's Index.

== See also ==
- List of philosophy journals
- Conceptualism
