= Contributions to the History of Concepts =

- Discipline: Conceptual history
- Language: English
- Edited by: Gabriel Entin, Jan Ifversen, Margrit Pernau, Silke Schwandt

Publication details
- History: 2005–present
- Publisher: Berghahn Journals
- Frequency: Biannual

Standard abbreviations
- ISO 4: Contrib. Hist. Concepts

Indexing
- ISSN: 1807-9326 (print); 1874-656X (web)
- LCCN: 2007240489
- OCLC no.: 750524538

Links
- Journal homepage; Online access

Contributions to the History of Concepts is a biannual peer-reviewed academic journal covering studies in conceptual history. It is an official journal of the History of Concepts Group. It is published by Berghahn Journals and affiliated to the University of Helsinki Centre for Intellectual History.

== History ==
When the History of Political and Social Concepts Group (now named History of Concepts Group) was founded in 1998, it established a History of Concepts Newsletter. This newsletter was first published at the Huizinga Institute (University of Amsterdam) and then at the Renvall Institute for Area and Cultural Studies (Helsinki University). In 2005, the newsletter was replaced by Contributions to the History of Concepts. The journal's founding editor-in-chief was João Feres, Jr. (Universidade Cândido Mendes). In its first years, the journal was hosted and sponsored by the Instituto Universitário de Pesquisas do Rio de Janeiro (Universidade Cândido Mendes) and published by Brill Publishers, until it moved to Berghahn journals in 2010 and was sponsored by the Van Leer Jerusalem Institute until 2016.

In 2017 substantial changes took place. The team of editors changed to Margrit Pernau, Jan Ifversen, and Jani Marjanen. They were joined by Rieke Trimcev and Gabriel Entin as book review editors, as well as Frederik Schröer and Luc Wodzicki as social media editors. Since 1 January 2017 until April 2022 the journal was affiliated with the University of Helsinki Centre for Intellectual History.

Since 2022, the Department of History at Bielefeld University hosts and sponsors the journal. In the same year, a large part of the team changed alongside the affiliation. After the reorganisation, the editorial team consists of Gabriel Entin, Jan Ifversen, Margrit Pernau, and Silke Schwandt. They are joined by Ilana Brown as the managing editor, Rieke Trimçev and Frederik Schröer as book review editors, with Olga Sabelfeld and Michael Götzelmann as social media editors.

The journal is abstracted and indexed in Scopus.
