= Hermann Lübbe =

German philosopher (born 1926)

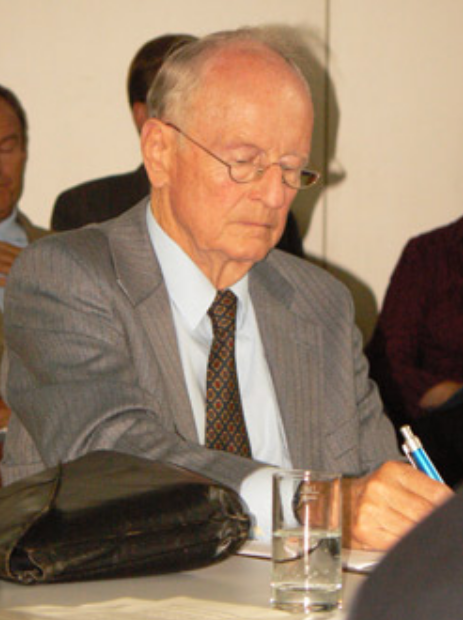
- Born: 31 December 1926 (age 99); Aurich, Weimar Republic
- Spouse: Grete Lübbe-Grothues

Education
- Education: University of Göttingen; University of Münster; University of Freiburg (PhD); University of Erlangen–Nuremberg (habilitation)
- Doctoral advisor: Wilhelm Szilasi
- Other advisors: Joachim Ritter, Heinrich Scholz

Philosophical work
- Era: Contemporary philosophy
- Region: Western philosophy
- School: Continental philosophy Ritter School
- Institutions: Ruhr University Bochum; Bielefeld University; University of Zurich
- Main interests: Political philosophy, philosophy of history, philosophy of religion

Hermann Lübbe (born 31 December 1926) is a German philosopher. He is considered a member of the Ritter School.

== Biography ==
Lübbe was born in Aurich. From 1947 to 1951, he studied philosophy, theology and sociology in Göttingen, Münster and Freiburg. Among his academic teachers were Joachim Ritter and Heinrich Scholz. From 1963 to 1969, Lübbe was professor in Bochum. Since 1966, he was also secretary of state in the education ministry of the German state North Rhine-Westphalia. In 1969, Lübbe became professor in Bielefeld and secretary of state with the minister-president of North Rhine-Westphalia. From 1971 to 1991, he was professor of philosophy and political theory in Zurich.

Lübbe's philosophical work focuses on a theory of modern civilization and liberal democracy. A prominent opponent of the protests of 1968 in Germany, he analyzed the acceleration of social change and emphasized the relevance of common sense, traditional virtues, stable political institutions and religious orientations in modern, highly dynamic societies. Criticized by Jürgen Habermas as one of the leading representatives of German neoconservatism in the 1970s and 1980s, Lübbe is now widely recognized as one of the most influential German political philosophers in the last decades. Lübbe and Habermas frequently clashed about the role of political intellectuals in a liberal democracy.

== Select bibliography ==
- Politische Philosophie in Deutschland: Studien zu ihrer Geschichte. (1963)
- Säkularisierung: Geschichte eines ideenpolitischen Begriffs. (1965)
- Theorie und Entscheidung: Studien zum Primat der praktischen Vernunft. (1971)
- Hochschulreform und Gegenaufklärung: Analysen, Postulate, Polemik zur aktuellen Hochschul- und Wissenschaftspolitik. (1972)
- Bewusstsein in Geschichten: Studien zur Phänomenologie der Subjektivität: Mach, Husserl, Schapp, Wittgenstein (1972)
- Fortschritt als Orientierungsproblem: Aufklärung in der Gegenwart. (1975)
- Geschichtsbegriff und Geschichtsinteresse: Analytik und Pragmatik der Historie. (1977)
- Endstation Terror: Rückblick auf lange Märsche. (1978)
- Philosophie nach der Aufklärung: Von der Notwendigkeit pragmatischer Vernunft. (1980)
- Religion nach der Aufklärung. (1986, 3rd edition 2004)
- Politischer Moralismus: Der Triumph der Gesinnung über die Urteilskraft. (1987)
- Fortschrittsreaktionen: Über konservative und destruktive Modernität. 1987
- Im Zug der Zeit: Verkürzter Aufenthalt in der Gegenwart. (1992)
- Abschied vom Superstaat: Vereinigte Staaten von Europa wird es nicht geben. (1994)
- „Ich entschuldige mich.“ Das neue politische Bußritual. (2001)
- Politik nach der Aufklärung: Philosophische Aufsätze. (2001)
- Wissenschaft und Religion nach der Aufklärung: Über den kulturellen Bedeutsamkeitsverlust wissenschaftlicher Weltbilder. (2001)
- Modernisierungsgewinner: Religion, Geschichtssinn, direkte Demokratie und Moral. (2004)
- Die Zivilisationsökumene: Globalisierung kulturell, technisch und politisch. (2005)
- Vom Parteigenossen zum Bundesbürger: Über beschwiegene und historisierte Vergangenheiten. (2007)
- Hermann Lübbe im Gespräch. Wilhelm Fink: Paderborn 2010. ISBN 978-3-7705-5044-9
