= Odo Marquard =

German philosopher (1928–2015)

- Born: Odo Dora Karl Marquard; 26 February 1928; Stolp, Farther Pomerania, Weimar Germany (present-day Słupsk, Poland)
- Died: 9 May 2015 (aged 87); Celle, Germany
- Awards: Sigmund Freud Prize (1984)

Education
- Alma mater: University of Münster; University of Freiburg (PhD)
- Doctoral advisor: Max Müller
- Other advisor: Joachim Ritter

Philosophical work
- Era: Contemporary philosophy
- Region: Western philosophy
- School: Continental philosophy Ritter School
- Institutions: University of Münster; University of Giessen
- Main interests: Philosophical anthropology, philosophy of history, hermeneutics, aesthetics

Odo Dora Karl Marquard (26 February 1928 – 9 May 2015) was a German philosopher. He was a professor of philosophy at the University of Giessen from 1965 to 1993. In 1984 he received the Sigmund Freud Prize for Scientific Prose.

== Early life and education ==
Odo Marquard was born in Stolp, Farther Pomerania. He studied philosophy, German literature and theology, obtaining his doctorate at the University of Münster and his habilitation at the University of Freiburg. In Münster he studied under Joachim Ritter, whose Ritter School he sometimes is considered a member of. An even greater influence was Max Müller, whom Marquard studied under in Freiburg, and his use of the philosophy of Edmund Husserl and Martin Heidegger to create a phenomenological update of neo-scholasticism.

== Career ==
From 1965 to 1993, Marquard held a chair for philosophy at the University of Giessen, serving as dean of the philosophical faculty. In 1982–1983 he was a fellow at the Berlin Institute for Advanced Study. From 1985 to 1987 he was the president of the General Society for Philosophy in Germany.

In 1984 he was awarded the Sigmund Freud Prize for Scientific Prose by the Deutsche Akademie für Sprache und Dichtung. He was awarded the Erwin-Stein-Preis (1992), the Ernst-Robert-Curtius-Preis for essay writers (1996), the Hessian Cultural Prize for science (1997), the Hessian Order of Merit (1990) and two Orders of Merit of the Federal Republic of Germany: the Cross of Merit 1. Class (1995) and the Great Cross of Merit (2008). In 1994, the year after he became professor emeritus, he received an honorary doctorate from the University of Jena.

== Thought ==
A proponent of philosophical hermeneutics and skepticism, Marquards work focuses on aspects of human fallibility, contingency and finitude. He rejected idealist, rationalist and universalist conceptions and defended philosophical particularism and pluralism. His essay "In Praise of Polytheism" provoked discussion and controversy in Germany. In it, he promotes a "disenchanted return of polytheism" as a political theology.

Criticized by Jürgen Habermas as a representative of German neoconservatism, his philosophy has been described as a form of liberal conservatism with various parallels to postmodern thought and the work of Richard Rorty.

== Selected bibliography ==
- Schwierigkeiten mit der Geschichtsphilosophie. Suhrkamp, Frankfurt am Main 1973, ISBN 3-518-27994-7
- Abschied vom Prinzipiellen. Reclam, Stuttgart 1981, ISBN 3-15-007724-9
- Apologie des Zufälligen. Reclam, Stuttgart 1986, ISBN 3-15-008351-6
- Skepsis und Zustimmung. Reclam, Stuttgart 1994, ISBN 3-15-009334-1
- Glück im Unglück. Fink, Munich 1995, ISBN 3-7705-3065-9
- Skepsis in der Moderne. Reclam, Stuttgart 2007, ISBN 3-15-018524-6
- Der Einzelne, ed. Franz Josef Wetz. Reclam, Stuttgart 2013, ISBN 978-3-15-019086-9

=== Works in English translation ===
- "On the importance of the theory of the unconscious for a theory of no longer fine art". Richard E. Amacher and Victor Lange (eds.) New perspectives in German literary criticism. Princeton, N.J.: Princeton University Press 1979. ISBN 0-691-06380-X
- Farewell to Matters of Principle. Philosophical Studies. New York/Oxford: Oxford University Press 1989. ISBN 978-0-19-505114-8
- In Defense of the Accidental. Philosophical Studies. New York/Oxford: Oxford University Press 1991. ISBN 978-0-19-507252-5
- "Presentation off duty and depoliticised revolution. Philosophical remarks on art and politics". Christos M. Joachimides and Norman Rosenthal (eds.) The age of modernism. Art in the 20th century. G. Hatje: Stuttgart 1997, pp. 39–48. ISBN 978-3-7757-0682-7
- "Several connections between aesthetics and therapeutics in nineteenth-century philosophy". Judith Norman and Alistair Welchman (eds.) The new Schelling. London/New York: Continuum 2004. ISBN 978-0-8264-6941-0
