= Joachim Ritter =

German philosopher

- Born: 3 April 1903; Geesthacht, Province of Schleswig-Holstein, Kingdom of Prussia, German Empire
- Died: 3 August 1974 (aged 71); Münster, North Rhine-Westphalia, West Germany

Education
- Education: University of Hamburg
- Doctoral advisor: Ernst Cassirer
- Other advisor: Martin Heidegger

Philosophical work
- Era: 20th-century philosophy
- Region: Western philosophy
- School: Continental philosophy Liberal conservatism (Ritter School)
- Institutions: University of Münster
- Doctoral students: Karlfried Gründer, Reinhart Maurer, Willi Oelmüller, Hans Jörg Sandkühler, Robert Spaemann, Bernard Willms
- Notable students: Günther Bien, Ernst-Wolfgang Böckenförde, Ulrich Dierse, Martin Kriele, Hermann Lübbe, Odo Marquard, Ludger Oeing-Hanhoff, Günter Rohrmoser
- Main interests: Philosophy of history; political philosophy

Joachim Ritter (German: [ˈʁɪtɐ]; 3 April 1903 – 3 August 1974) was a German philosopher and founder of the "Ritter School" (German: Ritter-Schule) of liberal conservatism.

== Biography ==
Born in Geesthacht, Ritter studied philosophy, theology, German literature and history in Heidelberg, Marburg, Freiburg and Hamburg. A disciple of Martin Heidegger and Ernst Cassirer, he obtained his doctorate at Hamburg with a dissertation on Nicolas of Cusa in 1925, and was both Cassirer's assistant and a lecturer there. A Marxist in the late 1920s and the early 1930s, he became a member of the Nazi Party in 1937 and an officer of the German Wehrmacht in 1940. After World War II, Ritter was appointed professor of philosophy at the University of Münster.

Ritter's philosophical work focuses on a theory of modernity. In a liberal interpretation of G. W. F. Hegel's Philosophy of Right, he developed the view that "bifurcation" is the constitutive structure of the modern world and a necessary precondition for the universal realization of individual freedom. According to Ritter's theory of culture as compensation, arts and humanities have the function of balancing the disenchanted, ahistorical condition of modern society. Alongside Hans-Georg Gadamer, his work on Aristotle's ethics and political theory initiated the renewal of practical philosophy in Germany. He died in Münster.

== Legacy ==
Ritter is considered one of the most influential philosophers in postwar West Germany. Among his disciples were scholars and public intellectuals like Ernst-Wolfgang Böckenförde, Max Imdahl, Hermann Lübbe, Odo Marquard, and Robert Spaemann. Together with them, Ritter started the Historisches Wörterbuch der Philosophie (Historical Dictionary of Philosophy, 13 vols., Basel: Schwabe Verlag, 1971–2007), and contributed to development of conceptual history in the field of philosophy.

In the 1980s, Jürgen Habermas opposed the Ritter School for being leading representatives of German neoconservatism. More recent scholarship in intellectual history points out Ritter's seminal role for the modernization of German political thought and the development of a modern liberal republicanism.

== See also ==
- Right Hegelians

== Bibliography ==
- Hegel and the French Revolution: Essays on the Philosophy of Right. (Studies in Contemporary German Social Thought), MIT Press 1984.
- Metaphysik und Politik. Studien zu Aristoteles und Hegel, Suhrkamp 1969.
- Person and property in Hegel's Philosophy of Right (§§34–81), in: Robert B. Pippin and Otfried Höffe (eds.), Hegel on Ethics and politics, Cambridge University Press 2007, p. 101-123.
- Subjektivität. Sechs Aufsätze. Suhrkamp 1974.
