= Reinhart Maurer =

German philosopher (born 1935)

Reinhart Klemens Maurer (born 26 March 1935) is a German philosopher.

== Biography ==
He was born in Xanten. He studied philosophy, German and English at the universities of Münster, Kiel and Vienna. In 1964, he completed his Ph.D. under Joachim Ritter. Maurer later wrote his post-doctoral research (Habilitation) in 1969 at the University of Stuttgart under the supervision of Robert Spaemann. Between 1962 and 1975, he was a research assistant and then a lecturer at the Institute for Philosophy and Pedagogy at the University of Stuttgart and from 1975 to 1997, he was a professor at the Institute for Philosophy (Institut für Philosophie) at the Free University of Berlin (Freie Universität Berlin).

Maurer was influenced by Joachim Ritter's concept of a practical philosophy that challenges concrete problems, in the tradition of the ancient European and the classical philosophy. This was his approach in his works about Plato, Hobbes, Hegel, Habermas and the critical theory. He applies critical theory to the modern, techno-democratic worldview, and ties it with fundamental critique of the modern society (Nietzsche, Heidegger, Arnold Gehlen and Gómez Dávila).

== Publications (in German) ==
- Hegel und das Ende der Geschichte. Interpretationen zur „Phänomenologie des Geistes“. Kohlhammer, Stuttgart u. a. 1965 (Zugleich: Münster, Universität, Dissertation, 1963/1964: Geschichtsphilosophie als „Phänomenologie des Geistes“. 2. Auflage erweitert um den Beitrag „Teleologische Aspekte der Hegelschen Philosophie“. Albert, Freiburg (Breisgau) u. a. 1980, ISBN 3-495-47435-8).
- Platons „Staat“ und die Demokratie. Historisch-systematische Überlegungen zur Politischen Ethik de Gruyter, Berlin 1970, ISBN 3-11-006391-3 (Zugleich: Stuttgart, Universität, Habilitations-Schrift, 1969: Politeia und Leviathan, zur Rehabilitation des Politischen. Teil 1: Der Platonische Staat. Auch in japanischer Sprache und Schrift: Tokio 2005).
- Revolution und „Kehre“. Studien zum Problem gesellschaftlicher Naturbeherrschung. Suhrkamp, Frankfurt am Main 1975, ISBN 3-518-07428-8.
- Jürgen Habermas' Aufhebung der Philosophie. (= Philosophische Rundschau. Beiheft 8 = Sonderheft). Mohr, Tübingen 1977, ISBN 3-16-839631-1.
- Schuld und Wohlstand. Über die westlich-deutsche Generallinie. In: Heimo Schwilk, Ulrich Schacht (Hrsg.): Die selbstbewußte Nation. „Anschwellender Bocksgesang“ und weitere Beiträge zu einer deutschen Debatte. Ullstein, Frankfurt am Main u. a. 1994, ISBN 3-550-07067-5, S. 69–84.
- Joachim Ritters Praktische Philosophie. In: Mark Schweda, Ulrich von Bülow (Hg.): Entzweite Moderne. Zur Aktualität Joachim Ritters und seiner Schüler. Wallstein, Göttingen 2017, S. 63–84.
- Joachim Ritter und die Philosophie der Nachkriegszeit. In: Information Philosophie 4/2018, S. 30–41.
