= Karl-Otto Apel =

German philosopher (1922–2017)

- Born: 15 March 1922; Düsseldorf, Weimar Germany
- Died: 15 May 2017 (aged 95); Niedernhausen, Germany

Education
- Education: University of Bonn
- Doctoral advisor: Erich Rothacker
- Other advisors: Johannes Hoffmeister; Leo Weisgerber

Philosophical work
- Era: Contemporary philosophy
- Region: Western philosophy
- School: Continental philosophy Critical theory Pragmatism
- Institutions: University of Mainz; University of Saarbrücken; University of Frankfurt am Main
- Main interests: Philosophy of language, ethics
- Notable ideas: Transcendental pragmatics

Karl-Otto Apel (/ˈɑːpəl/; German: [ˈaːpl̩]; 15 March 1922 – 15 May 2017) was a German philosopher and Professor Emeritus at the University of Frankfurt am Main. He specialized in the philosophy of language and was thus considered a communication theorist. He developed a distinctive philosophical approach which he coined transcendental pragmatics.

== Life ==
Apel grew up during the political crises of the Weimar Republic. In 1940, he was a war volunteer with his entire graduating class. After the Second World War, Apel studied from 1945 to 1950 at the University of Bonn, first history and intellectual history, before he committed himself as a student of Erich Rothacker to philosophy. In 1950, he received his doctorate from Bonn with a thesis on Martin Heidegger.

== Academic positions ==
Apel was appointed lecturer at the University of Mainz in 1961. He was a full professor of philosophy at the University of Kiel from 1962 to 1969, at the University of Saarbrücken from 1969 to 1972, and at the University of Frankfurt am Main from 1972 to 1990. In 1990, he transferred to emeritus status. He has held a number of visiting and guest professorships at universities around the world.

He was made a Member of the Academia Europaea in 1989 and a Full Member of the Academia Scientiarum et Artium Europaea in 1993. In 2001, he was awarded the Order of Merit of the Federal Republic of Germany.

== Philosophical work ==
Apel worked in ethics, the philosophy of language and human sciences. He wrote extensively in these fields, publishing mostly in German. Apel's work brings together the analytical and Continental philosophical traditions, especially pragmatism and the critical theory of the Frankfurt School. He developed a distinctive philosophical approach which he called transcendental pragmatics (Transzendentalpragmatik).

In Understanding and Explanation: A Transcendental-Pragmatic Perspective, Apel reformulated the difference between understanding (Verstehen) and explanation (Erklärung), which originated in the hermeneutics of Wilhelm Dilthey and interpretive sociology of Max Weber, on the basis of a Peircean-inspired transcendental-pragmatic account of language. This account of the "lifeworld" would become an element of the theory of communicative action and discourse ethics, which Apel co-developed with Jürgen Habermas. Strategic rationality both claim to stand in need of communicative rationality that is seen as, in several regards, more fundamental. While sympathetic to Habermas's Theory of Communicative Action, Apel has been critical of aspects of Habermas's approach. Apel has proposed that a theory of communication should be grounded in the transcendental-pragmatic conditions of communication. After taking his point of departure from Apel, Habermas has moved towards a "weak transcendentalism" that is more closely tied to empirical social inquiry.

Apel also wrote works on Charles Sanders Peirce and is a past president of the C. S. Peirce Society.

An early German-speaking adversary of so-called critical rationalism, Apel published a critique of the philosophy of Karl Popper: In Transformation der Philosophie (1973), Apel charged Popper with being guilty of, amongst other things, a pragmatic contradiction.

Apel died on 15 May 2017 at the age of 95.

== List of works ==
- Analytic Philosophy of Language and the Geisteswissenschaften (1967)
- Hermeneutik und Ideologiekritik (1971)
- Sprache, Brücke und Hindernis (1972)
- Dialog als Methode (1972)
- Transformation der philosophie: Sprachanalytik, Semiotik, Hermeneutik (1973)
- Transformation der philosophie: Das Apriori der Kommunikationsgemeinschaft (1976)
- Sprachpragmatik und philosophie (1976)
- Neue Versuche über Erklären und Verstehen (1978)
- Die Erklären/Verstehen-Kontroverse in Transzendentalpragmatischer Sicht (1979)
- Towards a Transformation of Philosophy (1980 & 1998)
- Charles S. Peirce: From Pragmatism to Pragmaticism (1981)
- Understanding and Explanation: A Transcendental-Pragmatic Perspective (1984)
- La comunicazione umana (1985)
- Diskurs und Verantwortung: Das Problem des Übergangs zur Postkonventionellen Moral (1988)
- Towards a Transcendental Semiotics: Selected Essays (1994)
- Ethics and the Theory of Rationality: Selected Essays (1996)
- Filosofia analitica e filosofia continentale (1997)
- From a Transcendental-Semiotic Point of View (1998)
- Mercier Lectures: "The Response of Discourse Ethics to the Moral Challenge of the Human Situation As Such, Especially Today" (2001)
- Fünf Vorlesungen über Transzendentale Semiotik als Erste Philosophie und Diskursethik (2002)
- Diskursethik und Diskursanthropologie (2002)
- Paradigmen der Ersten Philosophie: Zur reflexiven – transzendentalpragmatischen – Rekonstruktion der Philosophiegeschichte (2011)
- Transzendentale Reflexion und Geschichte (2017)
