= Political theology =

Relationship between theological concepts and politics

Political theology is a term which has been used in discussion of the ways in which theological concepts or ways of thinking relate to politics. The term is often used to denote religious thought about political principled questions. Scholars such as Carl Schmitt who wrote extensively on how to effectively wield political power, used it to denote religious concepts that were secularized and thus became key political concepts. It has often been affiliated with Christianity, but since the 21st century, it has more recently been discussed in relation to other religions.

== Definition and analysis ==
The term political theology has been used in a wide variety of ways by writers exploring different aspects of believers' relationship with politics. Political theology has roots in Hellenistic Judaism. It has been used to discuss Augustine of Hippo's City of God and Thomas Aquinas's works Summa Theologica and De Regno: On Kingship. It has likewise been used to describe the Eastern Orthodox view of symphonia and the works of the Protestant reformers Martin Luther and John Calvin.

Though the political aspects of Christianity, Islam, Confucianism, and other traditions has been debated for millennia, political theology has been an academic discipline since the 20th century.

The recent use of the term is often associated with the work of the prominent German jurist Carl Schmitt. Writing amidst the turbulence of the German Weimar Republic, Schmitt argued in his essay Politische Theologie (1922) that the main concepts of the modern theory of the state were secularized versions of older theological concepts. Mikhail Bakunin had used the term in his 1871 text "The Political Theology of Mazzini and the International" to which Schmitt's book was a response. Drawing on Thomas Hobbes in Leviathan he argued that the state exists to maintain its own integrity in order to ensure order in society in times of crisis.

While Schmitt's formulation has been highly influential, its interpretation remains contested. Some scholars, such as Heinrich Meier, have argued that Schmitt's thought is fundamentally grounded in political theology understood in terms of theological revelation.

Other authors have challenged this reading. Hugo Herrera argues that interpreting Schmitt primarily as a political theologian relies on a limited textual basis and overlooks the philosophical-anthropological and juridical dimensions of his work. According to Herrera, Schmitt's analysis of the political is structured by reflections on conflict, existential seriousness, and the relation between rule and case, situating juridical thought between technological rationality and theology rather than grounding it directly in the latter.

The medieval historian Ernst Kantorowicz offered another influential account of political theology in his The King's Two Bodies (1957). Tracing the theological origins of European monarchy, Kantorowicz argued that the distinction between the king's mortal body and his enduring political body emerged through the adaption of certain Christian concepts applied to secular political institutions.

Some have divided the approach of political theology between a rightist traditional concern with individual "moral reform" (such as Clyde Wilcox's God's Warriors [1992] and Ted Jelen's The Political World of the Clergy [1993]) and a leftist focus on collective "social justice" (such as Jeffrey K. Hadden's The Gathering Storm in the Churches [1969] and Harold Quinley's The Prophetic Clergy [1974]).

Kwok Pui-lan has argued that, while Schmitt may have come up with the term and its modern usage, political theologies were likewise forming along very different trajectories elsewhere around the world, such as in Asia. In China in the 1930s, for instance, the Protestant Wu Yaozong advocated that a social revolution was necessary to save both China and the world. This would likewise be true of the role of Protestants involved in Korean nationalism in the early twentieth century.

Many major non-Christian philosophers have written extensively on the topic of political theology during recent years, such as Jürgen Habermas, Odo Marquard, Giorgio Agamben, Simon Critchley, and Slavoj Žižek. Since the early 21st century, there has also been a growing discourse around Islamic political theology, especially within Western contexts that were previously dominated by Christianity.

In the 1990s and early 2000s, political theology became an important theme within legal theory, especially in constitutional law, international law and legal history. The literature draws heavily upon the legacy of Carl Schmitt (though often to debate his premises) and political philosophy (such as Ernesto Laclau), along with political phenomena, such as the 'War on Terror'. Subsequent to this Professor Francis Davis began calling for a deliberate integration of the political sciences into the method of 'political theology' originally in 1992 but specifically in 2017 coining the analytical term ' empirical political theology' . His 2022 article for Theology ( Sage Davis, F. (2022). The crisis in British Christian social thought: evidencing the need for a new ‘empirical political theology’. Theology, 125(5), 335-344. https://doi.org/10.1177/0040571X221119277) built on an earlier thesis and a chapter for Routledge examining how traditional 'political theory' theology was narrowed to micro social sciences, small scale ethnography and the humanities and now needed to be expanded. He specifically evidenced Aberdeen, Glasgow, Edinburgh, Durham, Oxford, Manchester and Cambridge for these gaps .

Another term which often occupies similar space in academic discourse is "public theology". It is said that political theology is directed more towards the government or the state, whereas public theology is more towards civil society.

== By region ==
=== China ===
Political theology in China includes responses from Chinese government leaders, scholars, and religious leaders who deal with the relationship between religion and politics. For two millennia, this was organized based on a Confucian understanding of religion and politics, often discussed in terms of Confucian political philosophy. At various points throughout its history, Chinese Buddhism presented an alternative to the political import of Confucianism. However, since the mid-twentieth century, communist understandings of religion have dominated the discourse.

For Christianity, this relationship can be seen from the religion's earliest encounters in the country during the imperial period, with the Church of the East's interaction with the Emperor Taizong and Jesuit missionaries in the Ming court. But it has developed the most in the 20th and 21st centuries after the establishments of the Republic of China and People's Republic of China, especially through the establishment of the Three-Self Patriotic Movement and rise of house churches.

=== Germany ===
The influence of the philosopher Georg Wilhelm Friedrich Hegel (1770–1831) is also evident throughout much of German political theology. This is particularly clear in the work of the Roman Catholic theologian Johann Baptist Metz (1928–2019) who explored the concept of political theology throughout his work. He argued for the concept of a "suffering God" who shared the pain of his creation, writing, "Yet, faced with conditions in God's creation that cry out to heaven, how can the theology of the creator God avoid the suspicion of apathy unless it takes up the language of a suffering God?" This leads Metz to develop a theology that is related to Marxism. He criticizes what he terms bourgeois Christianity and believes that the Christian Gospel has become less credible because it has become entangled with bourgeois religion. His work Faith in History and Society develops apologetics, or fundamental theology, from this perspective.

Two of the other major developers of political theology in Germany were Jürgen Moltmann and Dorothee Sölle. As in Metz' work, the concept of a suffering God is important to Moltmann's theological program. Moltmann's political theology was influenced strongly by the Marxist philosopher Ernst Bloch, and both Moltmann and Sölle were influenced heavily by liberation theology, as was Metz. Another early influence was the Frankfurt School of critical theory, especially Walter Benjamin, and the Frankfurt School's broader critique of modernity.

Odo Marquard became the center of discussion and controversy with his 1979 essay "In Praise of Polytheism". It argues that the separation of powers has it origin in polytheism, and proposes a political theology based on "enlightened polymythical thinking".

=== Middle East ===
Christian political theology in the Middle East is a religious response by Christian leaders and scholars to political problems. Political theologians try to balance the demands of a tumultuous region with the delicate but long history of Christianity in the Middle East. This has yielded a diversity of political theology disproportionate to the small size of Middle East Christian minorities. The region's importance to Christians worldwide – both for history and doctrinal authority for many denominations – also shapes the political theologies of the Middle East.

For many Christian leaders, the dominant approach to political theology is one of survival. Many Arab Christians see themselves as the heirs of a rich Christian heritage whose existence is threatened by regional unrest and religious persecution. Their chief political goal is survival, which sets their political theology apart.

At times, Arab Christian leaders have appealed to Christians outside the region through both denominational challenges and broader calls to Christian unity for humanitarian or political aid. In other cases, Christian politicians downplay their faith in the public sphere to avoid conflict with their Muslim neighbours.

In the mid-20th century, many Christians in the Middle East saw secular politics as a way out of their traditional status as a minority community in the Islamic world. Christians played prominent roles throughout the pan-Arab nationalist movement in the mid-20th century, where their experience with Western politics and generally high educational attainments made their contributions valuable to nationalist governments around the region. One prominent example was Michel Aflaq, an Eastern Orthodox Christian who formed the first Ba'ath group from students in Damascus in the 1940s. His belief was that Christians should embrace Islam as part of their cultural identity because nationalism was the best way for Christians to be successful in the Middle East.

=== Sub-Saharan Africa ===
Political theology in sub-Saharan Africa deals with the relationship of theology and politics, arising from the anti-apartheid struggle in South Africa and nationalist campaigns of the mid to late twentieth century elsewhere. The increasing numbers of Christians in sub-Saharan Africa has led to an increased interest in Christian responses to the region's continuing issues of poverty, violence, and war. According to the Cameroonian theologian and sociologist Jean-Marc Éla, African Christianity "has to be formulated from the struggles of our people, from their joys, from their pains, from their hopes and from their frustrations today." African theology is heavily influenced by liberation theology, global black theology, and postcolonial theology.

Notable thinkers include Itumeleng Mosala, Jesse N. K. Mugambi, and Desmond Tutu.

=== United States ===
Reinhold Niebuhr also developed a theology similar to Metz in the practical application of theology. During the 1930s, Niebuhr was a leader of the Socialist Party of America, and although he broke with the party later in life, socialist thought is a prominent component of his development of Christian realism. The work by Niebuhr that best exemplifies his relationship with political theology is Moral Man and Immoral Society: A Study of Ethics and Politics (1932).

One of the most influential developers of recent political theology is Stanley Hauerwas, though he considers his work to be better termed a "theological politics". Hauerwas has actively critiqued the political theology of both Reinhold Niebuhr and H. Richard Niebuhr, and has been a frequently critic of Christians' attempt to attain political power and align themselves with secular political ideologies. Moreover, he has been a severe critic of liberal democracy, capitalism, and militarism, arguing that all of those ideologies are antithetical to Christian convictions.

== See also ==
- Cultural mandate
- Hebrew republic
- Multitude (philosophy)
- Political aspects of Islam
- Political ethics
- Theonomy
