= Erich Rothacker =

German philosopher (1888–1965)

- Born: 12 March 1888; Pforzheim, Grand Duchy of Baden, German Empire
- Died: 11 August 1965 (aged 77); Bonn, North Rhine-Westphalia, West Germany

Academic background
- Education: University of Tübingen (PhD)
- Doctoral advisor: Heinrich Maier

Academic work
- Discipline: Philosophical anthropology
- Institutions: Heidelberg University, University of Bonn
- Doctoral students: Karl-Otto Apel

Erich Rothacker (German: [ˈʁoːtˌakɐ]; 12 March 1888 – 11 August 1965) was a German philosopher, a leading exponent of philosophical anthropology.

Rothacker's first major work, Logik und Systematik der Geisteswissenschaften (Logic of the Human Sciences, 1920), presents the view that actual historical individuals, whose cognitive equipment is partially created by a specific cultural community while at the same time constantly being modified, are the elements that constitute the subject of knowledge, rather than a timeless universal entity as it is represented by Descartes or Locke.

== Works ==
- Einleitung in die Geisteswissenschaften (1920)
- Logik und Systematik der Geisteswissenschaften (Logic of the Human Sciences, 1920)
- Die Schichten der Persönlichkeit, 1938
- Mensch und Geschichte, 1944
- Probleme der Kulturanthropologie (Problems of the Anthropology of Culture, 1948)
