= Karen Ng (philosopher) =

Canadian philosopher and professor

Academic background
- Education: New School for Social Research (PhD)
- Thesis: The Life of the Concept: Freedom and Form in Hegel's Logic (2012)
- Doctoral advisor: J. M. Bernstein
- Other advisors: Richard J. Bernstein, Frederick Neuhouser, Christoph Menke, Markus Gabriel, Rocío Zambrana

Academic work
- Era: Contemporary philosophy
- Region: Western philosophy
- School or tradition: German idealism
- Institutions: Vanderbilt University
- Website: karen-ng.com

Karen Ng is an associate professor of philosophy at Vanderbilt University. From 2023 to 2025, she was an Alexander von Humboldt Research Fellow at Center for Post-Kantian Philosophy of the University of Potsdam.

== Life and work ==
Karen was born in Hong Kong, and her family moved to Toronto when she was five years old. She earned her B.A. from the University of Toronto, her M.A. from the University of Essex, and her Ph.D. from The New School for Social Research with the dissertation "The Life of Concept: Freedom and Form in Hegel's Logic" in 2012.

Her 2020 work, Hegel’s Concept of Life: Self-Consciousness, Freedom, Logic was the winner of Journal of the History of Philosophy (JHP) book prize in 2021, as well as subject two book symposiums first by JHP, containing reviews from Thomas Khurana, Julia Peters, and Christopher Yeomans, followed by a response from Ng, and the second by Hegel Bulletin, containing reviews from Sebastian Rand and Karen Koch, also followed by a reply from Ng. The book has also received reviews from Matı́as von dem Bussche, Gerad Gentry, Christoph Schuringa, Clinton Tolley, Stephen Houlgate, Berker Basmaci, Marina F. Bykova, Eliza Starbuck Little, Andrés Ortigosa, Sebastian Richardson, Emmanuel Chaput, Jensen Suther, Karl von der Luft, Antoine Auvé, Camilla Brenni, Robert M. Wallace, and Andrea Gambarotto.

=== Publications ===
- Ng, Karen (2020). Hegel's Concept of Life. doi:10.1093/oso/9780190947613.001.0001. ISBN 978-0-19-094761-3.
