= Hegel Society of Great Britain =

English-speaking forum for Hegel scholars

The Hegel Society of Great Britain
- Abbreviation: HSGB
- Formation: September, 1979
- Founded at: Pembroke College, Oxford
- Type: Learned Society
- Purpose: "The study of the philosophical ideas of Georg Wilhelm Friedrich Hegel and their historical sources and influence."
- Location: United Kingdom
- Origins: 1979-present
- Members: 200
- Honorary President: Robert B. Pippin
- President: Stephen Houlgate
- Secretary: Sebastian Stein
- Bulletin Editor: Christoph Schuringa
- Key people: Joe Saunders (Treasurer)
- Publication: Hegel Bulletin
- Website: https://hegel-society.org.uk

The Hegel Society of Great Britain (HSGB) is an English-speaking forum for scholars and students interested in the writings of the philosopher GWF Hegel (1770–1831). Such scholastic interest may extend to Hegel's predecessors, contemporaries, followers and critics.

The HSGB was founded in 1979, has over 200 members, and holds an annual conference. Its bi-annual journal is the Hegel Bulletin, published by Cambridge University Press.

== History ==
The inaugural meeting of the society was held in Pembroke College, Oxford, on September 21-22, 1979. During this meeting J. N. Findlay and T. M. Knox were elected as joint honorary presidents of the society. The executive committee consisted of:

- Raymond Plant (Southampton University), as Chairman
- David Lamb (Manchester University), as Secretary/Treasurer
- Z. A. Pelcynski (Pembroke College, Oxford), as Bulletin Editor

Other members of the council included: Leon Pampa (University of Birmingham), Charles Taylor (University of Oxford), W. H. Walsh (University of Edinburgh) and Howard Williams (Aberystwyth University).

== List of presidents ==
- Stephen Houlgate
- Robert Stern
- Raymond Plant (Chairman)
- Z. A. Pelcynski (Chairman)

=== Honorary presidents ===
- Robert B. Pippin
- John W. Burbidge
- H. S. Harris
- J. N. Findlay
- T. M. Knox

== See also ==
- Hegel Society of America
- Internationale Hegel-Vereinigung
- Internationale Hegel-Gesellschaft
- Centre de recherche et de documentation sur Hegel
- Hegel-Archiv
