= Heinz Kimmerle =

German philosopher (1930–2016)

Heinz Kimmerle (December 16, 1930 in Solingen – January 17, 2016 in Leiden) was a German philosopher.

== Life ==
Youth, education and early professional years

Kimmerle was born in Solingen in 1930, where he attended elementary school and then the Gymnasium Schwertstraße. After a semester at the Evangelisches Studienwerk in Villigst near Schwerte/Ruhr, he studied philosophy, modern German literature and exegesis of the New Testament in Tübingen, Bonn and Heidelberg from 1951 to 1957. In 1957, he completed his doctorate with Hans-Georg Gadamer on "Die Hermeneutik Schleiermachers im Zusammenhang seines spekulativen Denkens". He spent his first professional years from 1958 to 1963 as director of studies at the Evangelisches Studienwerk Villigst. He then worked as a research assistant at the Hegel Archive, from 1964 to 1969 in Bonn and from 1969 to 1971 in Bochum. In 1971, he habilitated in philosophy at the Ruhr University Bochum with a thesis on "Das Problem der Abgeschlossenheit des Denkens. Hegels "System der Philosophie" in den Jahren 1800–1804".

== Research and teaching activities ==
While working at the Evangelisches Studienwerk, he received a research grant from the German Research Foundation for a thesis on the topic of "Auseinandersetzung mit Ernst Blochs marxistischer Philosophie der Hoffnung". At the Hegel Archive, he compiled a chronology of Hegel's writings in Jena (1801–1807), which served as the basis for the historical-critical edition of volumes 5-9 of Hegel's Collected Works. Together with Klaus Düsing, he was responsible for the edition of volume 6: "Jenaer Systementwürfe I". From 1971 to 1976, he was a lecturer in philosophy at the Ruhr University in Bochum. In 1974 he was awarded the title of associate professor. In 1976, he was appointed full professor of methods of philosophy at Erasmus University Rotterdam. During the last five years of his appointment, from 1991 to 1995, he held an endowed chair for "Foundations of Intercultural Philosophy". In 1989 he was a visiting professor at the University of Nairobi in Kenya and at the University of Ghana in Legon/Accra, in 1997 at the University of Venda in South Africa and in 2002 at the University of South Africa in Pretoria. In 2003, he received an honorary doctorate from the latter university.

=== Non-university activities ===
From 1964, Kimmerle was a member of the International Hegel Association founded by Hans-Georg Gadamer and the International Hegel Society founded by Wilhelm Raimund Beyer. From 1982 to 1991, together with Rudolf W. Meyer, who died in early 1989, and Wolfgang Lefèvre, he was a member of the board of the International Hegel Society. From 1982 to 1995, he was a member of the editorial commission of Schleiermacher's Kritischen Gesamtausgabe (Critical Complete Edition). From 1989, he was on the scientific advisory board of the Society of Intercultural Philosophy. He was particularly responsible for African philosophy. In 1996, he founded the Stiftung für interkulturelle Philosophie und Kunst (Foundation for Intercultural Philosophy and Art), of which he was chairman. The foundation has organized numerous projects, in particular the annual exhibitions of artists from the Netherlands and the Spanish island of La Palma from 1996 to 2008. Another outstanding event was the exhibition of works by eight artists from the Venda region in South Africa at the Zuid-Afrikahuis in Amsterdam from August to October 2005 and at the Stadsmuseum in Zoetermeer from October to December 2005. From 2001 to 2010, Kimmerle worked at the private philosophy school Filosofie Oost-West in Utrecht, where he regularly gave lectures on African philosophy.

=== Work ===
His 1957 dissertation documents his interest in hermeneutics and its application to the New Testament. Since 1959, the research assignment on Bloch's philosophy of hope led to more socio-philosophically oriented questions and methodologically to an emphasis on the dialectical elements in hermeneutics. In Hegel research, the work on the chronology of the Jena writings resulted in a new sequence of important texts from this period. On this basis, it became possible to reconstruct and critically interpret Hegel's system of philosophy in the early Jena years in his habilitation thesis of 1971. This was followed by research on Hegel, Marx and the history of dialectics. A reading of Jacques Derrida's interpretation of Hegel led to a turn towards the philosophies of difference, in which particular attention was paid to the difference between genders. In a further step, he addressed the difference between cultures and thus arrived at intercultural philosophy in 1988. In this context, he devoted himself in particular to dialogs with African philosophers. He visited universities and sought contact with colleagues in Tanzania, Kenya, Ghana, Ivory Coast, Senegal, Mali and South Africa. In 1997, he helped to set up a philosophy department at the University of Venda in South Africa.

== Writings ==
Als Herausgeber

- F.D.E. Schleiermacher, Hermeneutik. Heidelberg 1959, 2. Aufl. 1974 (Englische Übersetzung: Missoula, Mont. 1977; Französische Übersetzung: Paris 1987)
- (mit K. Düsing): G.W.F. Hegel, Gesammelte Werke. Band 6: Jenaer Systementwürfe I. Hamburg 1975
- Modelle der materialistischen Dialektik. Beiträge der Bochumer Dialektik-Arbeitsgemeinschaft. Den Haag 1978. (Reprint online)
- (R.W. Meyer und W. Lefèvre): Dialektik heute. Rotterdamer Arbeitspapiere. Bochum 1983.
- Hegel-Jahrbuch 1984/85 bis 1992, Bochum 1987 bis 1992
- (mit R.A. Mall): Studien zur interkulturellen Philosophie. Bände 1–17, Amsterdam/Atlanta, GA 1993 bis 2006
- Poesie und Philosophie in einer tragischen Kultur. Texte eines Hölderlin-Symposiums am 8. September 1993 im Goethe-Institut Rotterdam mit einem Bildteil, Würzburg 1995
- Das Multiversum der Kulturen. Beiträge zu einer Vorlesung in Fach ‚Interkulturelle Philosophie‘ an der Erasmus-Universität Rotterdam, Amsterdam/Atlanta, GA 1996.
- (mit H. Oosterling): Sensus communis in Multi- and Intercultural Perspective. On the Posiibility of Common Judgments in Arts and Politics. Würzburg 2000.
- Tijd en taal, Wijsgerig perspectief. 44, 4, Amsterdam 2004.
- Die Eigenbedeutung der Jenaer Systemkonzeptionen Hegels. Gemeinsame Tagung der Internationalen Hegel-Gesellschaft und der Internationalen Hegel-Vereinigung, 10.–12. April 2003. Erasmus-Universität Rotterdam, Berlin 2004
- (mit A. van den Braembussche und N. Note): Intercultural Aesthetics. A Worldview Perspective. Dordrecht u. a. 2009

Monographs

- Die Hermeneutik Schleiermachers im Zusammenhang seines spekulativen Denkens. Heidelberg 1957 DNB-IDN 480690111 (Dissertation Universität Heidelberg, Philosophische Fakultät, 10. September 1957, 123 Seiten).
- Die Zukunftsbedeutung der Hoffnung. Auseinandersetzung mit dem Ernst Blochs "Prinzip Hoffnung" aus philosophischer und theologischer Sicht. Bonn 1966, 2. Auflage 1974.
- Das Problem der Abgeschlossenheit des Denkens. Hegels ‚System der Philosophie‘ in den Jahren 1800 bis 1804. Bonn 1970; 2. Auflage 1982, ISBN 3-416-01670-X.
- Die Bedeutung der Geisteswissenschaften für die Gesellschaft. Stuttgart u. a. 1971.
- Die Gottesfrage im konkreten Theorie-Praxis-Zusammenhang. Bonn 1975, ISBN 3-416-01062-0.
- Dialektiek als kritiek op de wetenschappen. Leiden 1977, ISBN 90-207-0751-5.
- Philosophie der Geisteswissenschaften als Kritik ihrer Methoden. Den Haag 1978, ISBN 90-247-2111-3.
- Entwurf einer Philosophie des Wir. Schule des alternativen Denkens. Bochum 1985, ISBN 3-88663-108-7.
- Versuche anfänglichen Denkens. Mit Bildbeigaben von Fritz Vahle, Bochum 1985, ISBN 3-88663-115-X.
- Wege und Raum. Mit einem Bildteil von F. Kimmerle, Amsterdam 1987, ISBN 90-71466-11-6.
- Derrida zur Einführung. Hamburg 1988, 7. Auflage 2008, ISBN 978-3-88506-652-1 (Übersetzung ins Koreanische, Seoul 1996).
- Philosophie in Afrika – afrikanische Philosophie. Annäherungen an einen interkulturellen Philosophiebegriff. Frankfurt am Main 1991, ISBN 3-593-34422-X (Übersetzung ins Türkische, Istanbul 1995).
- De dood is (geen) einde. Over het dubbele gezicht van het einde in intercultureel perspectief. Rotterdamse Filosofische Studies, XV, 1992, ISBN 90-70116-61-8.
- Die Dimension des Interkulturellen. Philosophie in Afrika – afrikanische Philosophie. Zweiter Teil: Supplemente und Verallgemeinerungsschritte. Amsterdam / Atlanta, GA 1994, ISBN 90-5183-694-5.
- Mazungumzo. Dialogen tussen Afrikaanse en Westerse filosofieën. Amsterdam / Meppel 1995, ISBN 90-5352-114-3.
- Philosophien der Differenz. Eine Einführung. Würzburg 2000, ISBN 3-8260-2000-6.
- Interkulturelle Philosophie zur Einführung. Hamburg 2002, ISBN 3-88506-366-2.
- Afrikanische Philosophie im Kontext der Weltphilosophie. (= IKB Band 60), Verlag Traugott Bautz, Nordhausen 2005, ISBN 3-88309-223-1.
- Georg Wilhelm Friedrich Hegel interkulturell gelesen. (= IKB Band 54), Verlag Traugott Bautz, Nordhausen 2005, ISBN 978-3-88309-222-5.
- Jacques Derrida interkulturell gelesen. (= IKB Band 18), Verlag Traugott Bautz, Nordhausen 2005, ISBN 978-3-88309-178-5.
- Rückkehr ins Eigene. Die interkulturelle Dimension in der Philosophie. (= IKB Band 6), Verlag Traugott Bautz, Nordhausen 2006, ISBN 978-3-88309-169-3.
- Das Eigene – anders gesehen. Ergebnisse interkultureller Erfahrungen. (= IKB Band 48), Verlag Traugott Bautz, Nordhausen 2007, ISBN 978-3-88309-193-8.
- Spiegelungen westlichen und afrikanischen Denkens. (= IKB Band 58), Verlag Traugott Bautz, Nordhausen 2008, ISBN 978-3-88309-229-4.
- Der Philosophiebegriff der interkulturellen Philosophie. (= IKB Band 66), Verlag Traugott Bautz, Nordhausen 2009, ISBN 978-3-88309-240-9.
- Was Farbe bewirken kann (= IKB Band 35), Verlag Traugott Bautz, Nordhausen 2009, ISBN 978-3-88309-206-5.
- Philosophie – Geschichte – Philosophiegeschichte. Ein Weg von Hegel zur interkulturellen Philosophie. (= IKB Band 132), Verlag Traugott Bautz, Nordhausen 2009, ISBN 978-3-88309-529-5.
- Vernunft und Glaube im Gleichgewicht. Ein philosophischer Lebensweg. Freiburg im Breisgau 2010, ISBN 978-3-495-48444-9.
- mit Antoni Folkers: Heer Bommel in Afrika. Religie en geloof in Marten Toonders universum en in het Afrikaanse animisme. Antwerpen 2013, ISBN 978-90-441-2997-7.

== Literature ==
- Henk Oosterling, Frans de Jong (Hrsg.): Denken unterwegs. Philosophie im Kräftefeld sozialen und politischen Engagements. Festschrift für Heinz Kimmerle zu seinem 60. Geburtstag. Grüner, Amsterdam 1990, ISBN 90-6032-317-3.
- Dowe Tiemersma, Henk Oosterling (Hrsg.): Time and Temporality in Intercultural Perspective. Editions Rodopi, Amsterdam / Atlanta, GA 1996, ISBN 90-5183-973-1 (englisch).
- Henk Oosterling: Interkulturalität im Denken Heinz Kimmerles (= Interkulturelle Bibliothek, Band 44). Bautz, Nordhausen 2005, ISBN 978-3-88309-216-4.
- Hamid Reza Yousefi, Hermann-Josef Scheidgen, Henk Oosterling (Hrsg.): Von der Hermeneutik zur Interkulturellen Philosophie. Festschrift für Heinz Kimmerle zum 80. Geburtstag. Bautz, Nordhausen 2010, ISBN 978-3-88309-569-1.
