= 2016 Paul Hunter Classic =

Paul Hunter Classic
Tournament information
- Dates: 24–28 August 2016
- Venue: Stadthalle
- City: Fürth
- Country: Germany
- Organisation: World Snooker
- Format: Ranking event
- Total prize fund: €125,000
- Winner's share: €25,000
- Highest break: Thepchaiya Un-Nooh (THA) (147)

Final
- Champion: Mark Selby (ENG)
- Runner-up: Tom Ford (ENG)
- Score: 4–2

The 2016 Paul Hunter Classic was a professional ranking snooker tournament that took place between 24 and 28 August 2016 at the Stadthalle in Fürth, Germany. It was the fourth ranking event of the 2016/2017 season.

Named in honour of former professional snooker player Paul Hunter, this was the first time for which the event was a ranking tournament, having previously been a minor-ranking event of the Players Tour Championship. It was also the first of the two ranking events of the season, along with the Gibraltar Open (also a former European Tour event), which would be open to amateurs and would form the new Amateur Order of Merit.

Ali Carter was the defending champion, but he was defeated 3–4 by Yan Bingtao in the last 32.

Thepchaiya Un-Nooh made the 119th official maximum break in the second frame of his last 32 match against Kurt Maflin. It was Un-Nooh's first professional maximum break, having missed the final black on two occasions the previous season.

Mark Selby won his 8th ranking title, defeating Tom Ford 4–2 in the final.

== Prize fund ==
The breakdown of prize money for this year is shown below:

- Winner: €25,000
- Runner-up: €12,000
- Semi-final: €6,000
- Quarter-final: €4,000
- Last 16: €2,300
- Last 32: €1,200
- Last 64: €700
- Non-televised highest break: €
- Televised highest break: €
- Total: €125,000

The "rolling 147 prize" for a maximum break stood at £40,000.

== Main rounds ==
=== Top half ===
==== Section 1 ====
Last 128; Best of 7 frames
(China) Zhou Yuelong	1
(England) Anthony Hamilton	4
(Republic of Ireland) Josh Boileau	0
(England) Ricky Walden	4
(Belgium) Luca Brecel	2
(England) Liam Highfield	4
(Scotland) Ross Muir	3
(England) Sean Harvey	4
(Wales) Gareth Allen	2
(England) Mark Davis	4
(England) Sanderson Lam	4
(England) Jason Weston	2
(Wales) Lee Walker	w/o
(Iran) Hossein Vafaei	w/d
(England) Adam Duffy	4
(England) Michael Williams	0

Last 64; Best of 7 frames
(England) Anthony Hamilton	0
(England) Ricky Walden	4
(England) Liam Highfield	4
(England) Sean Harvey	3
(England) Mark Davis	4
(England) Sanderson Lam	2
(Wales) Lee Walker	4
(England) Adam Duffy	1

Last 32; Best of 7 frames
(England) Ricky Walden	3
(England) Liam Highfield	4
(England) Mark Davis	4
(Wales) Lee Walker	2

Last 16; Best of 7 frames
(England) Liam Highfield	3
(England) Mark Davis	4

==== Section 2 ====
Last 128; Best of 7 frames
(England) James Cahill	4
(Belgium) Kevin Vandevoort	0
(Wales) Ryan Day	w/o
(England) Peter Ebdon	w/d
(England) Mark Selby	4
(England) Oliver Brown	0
(England) Martin O'Donnell	1
(England) Elliot Slessor	4
(China) Zhao Xintong	4
(England) Ashley Hugill	1
(China) Liang Wenbo	4
(England) David Lilley	3
(England) Gary Wilson	4
(Wales) Jak Jones	1
(England) Sam Baird	4
(England) Daniel Ward	2

Last 64; Best of 7 frames
(England) James Cahill	4
(Wales) Ryan Day	2
(England) Mark Selby	4
(England) Elliot Slessor	0
(China) Zhao Xintong	2
(China) Liang Wenbo	4
(England) Gary Wilson	1
(England) Sam Baird	4

Last 32; Best of 7 frames
(England) James Cahill	3
(England) Mark Selby	4
(China) Liang Wenbo	2
(England) Sam Baird	4

Last 16; Best of 7 frames
(England) Mark Selby	4
(England) Sam Baird	2

==== Section 3 ====
Last 128; Best of 7 frames
(England) Rod Lawler	4
(England) Mitchell Mann	2
(England) Stuart Carrington	4
(Wales) Ben Jones	0
(China) Xiao Guodong	4
(England) Robert Read	0
(England) Jimmy White	4
(England) Jamie Curtis-Barrett	2
(China) Mei Xiwen	4
(England) Steven Hallworth	3
(Malta) Alex Borg	2
(Australia) Kurt Dunham	4
(Isle of Man) Darryl Hill	w/d
(China) Zhang Anda	w/o
(Wales) Michael White	4
(China) Yu Delu	1

Last 64; Best of 7 frames
(England) Rod Lawler	4
(England) Stuart Carrington	1
(China) Xiao Guodong	2
(England) Jimmy White	4
(China) Mei Xiwen	4
(Australia) Kurt Dunham	2
(China) Zhang Anda	w/d
(Wales) Michael White	w/o

Last 32; Best of 7 frames
(England) Rod Lawler	1
(England) Jimmy White	4
(China) Mei Xiwen	2
(Wales) Michael White	4

Last 16; Best of 7 frames
(England) Jimmy White	4
(Wales) Michael White	2

==== Section 4 ====
Last 128; Best of 7 frames
(England) Mark Joyce	w/o
(Thailand) Noppon Saengkham	w/d
(England) Ali Carter	4
(Republic of Ireland) Stephen Bateman	1
(Scotland) Scott Donaldson	4
(England) Hammad Miah	3
(China) Yan Bingtao	4
(England) Alfie Burden	3
(England) Ben Woollaston	2
(Wales) Dominic Dale	4
(Thailand) Kritsanut Lertsattayathorn	w/d
(England) Ian Glover	w/o
(England) Michael Holt	4
(Germany) Felix Frede	1
(Thailand) Boonyarit Keattikun	w/o
(England) Robert Milkins	w/d

Last 64; Best of 7 frames
(England) Mark Joyce	3
(England) Ali Carter	4
(Scotland) Scott Donaldson	3
(China) Yan Bingtao	4
(Wales) Dominic Dale	4
(England) Ian Glover	1
(England) Michael Holt	w/o
(Thailand) Boonyarit Keattikun	w/d

Last 32; Best of 7 frames
(England) Ali Carter	3
(China) Yan Bingtao	4
(Wales) Dominic Dale	4
(England) Michael Holt	2

Last 16; Best of 7 frames
(China) Yan Bingtao	1
(Wales) Dominic Dale	4

=== Bottom half ===
==== Section 5 ====
Last 128; Best of 7 frames
(England) Oliver Lines	1
(Norway) Kurt Maflin	4
(Scotland) Anthony McGill	4
(England) George Pragnall	0
(Thailand) Dechawat Poomjaeng	4
(England) Martin Gould	2
(Thailand) Thepchaiya Un-Nooh	4
(China) Lü Chenwei	0
(Republic of Ireland) Fergal O'Brien	4
(England) Ashley Beal	0
(China) Li Hang	4
(England) Jamie Cope	2
(China) Zhang Yong	2
(Northern Ireland) Mark Allen	4
(Northern Ireland) Joe Swail	4
(England) Matthew Glasby	0

Last 64; Best of 7 frames
(Norway) Kurt Maflin	4
(Scotland) Anthony McGill	3
(Thailand) Dechawat Poomjaeng	2
(Thailand) Thepchaiya Un-Nooh	4
(Republic of Ireland) Fergal O'Brien	3
(China) Li Hang	4
(Northern Ireland) Mark Allen	4
(Northern Ireland) Joe Swail	1

Last 32; Best of 7 frames
(Norway) Kurt Maflin	1
(Thailand) Thepchaiya Un-Nooh	4
(China) Li Hang	2
(Northern Ireland) Mark Allen	4

Last 16; Best of 7 frames
(Thailand) Thepchaiya Un-Nooh	4
(Northern Ireland) Mark Allen	3

==== Section 6 ====
Last 128; Best of 7 frames
(England) Jack Lisowski	4
(England) Matthew Day	1
(England) Jimmy Robertson	0
(England) Kyren Wilson	4
(Wales) Matthew Stevens	4
(Germany) Patrick Einsle	2
(England) Sean O'Sullivan	0
(England) David Grace	4
(England) Andrew Higginson	4
(England) Allan Taylor	1
(Finland) Robin Hull	w/d
(Scotland) Rhys Clark	w/o
(England) Joe Perry	4
(Scotland) Michael Collumb	2
(England) Robbie Williams	4
(Germany) Simon Lichtenberg	1

Last 64; Best of 7 frames
(England) Jack Lisowski	4
(England) Kyren Wilson	0
(Wales) Matthew Stevens	3
(England) David Grace	4
(England) Andrew Higginson	4
(Scotland) Rhys Clark	1
(England) Joe Perry	2
(England) Robbie Williams	4

Last 32; Best of 7 frames
(England) Jack Lisowski	0
(England) David Grace	4
(England) Andrew Higginson	3
(England) Robbie Williams	4

Last 16; Best of 7 frames
(England) David Grace	4
(England) Robbie Williams	0

==== Section 7 ====
Last 128; Best of 7 frames
(England) David Gilbert	4
(England) Daniel Devlin	0
(Cyprus) Michael Georgiou	4
(Scotland) Fraser Patrick	1
(England) Sydney Wilson	1
(England) Stuart Bingham	4
(Egypt) Hatem Yassen	0
(Northern Ireland) Gerard Greene	4
(China) Cao Yupeng	4
(England) Barry Pinches	3
(Wales) Jamie Jones	4
(China) Tian Pengfei	0
(England) Nigel Bond	3
(England) Craig Steadman	4
(England) Michael Wild	1
(England) Peter Lines	4

Last 64; Best of 7 frames
(England) David Gilbert	2
(Cyprus) Michael Georgiou	4
(England) Stuart Bingham	3
(Northern Ireland) Gerard Greene	4
(China) Cao Yupeng	1
(Wales) Jamie Jones	4
(England) Craig Steadman	3
(England) Peter Lines	4

Last 32; Best of 7 frames
(Cyprus) Michael Georgiou	1
(Northern Ireland) Gerard Greene	4
(Wales) Jamie Jones	4
(England) Peter Lines	1

Last 16; Best of 7 frames
(Northern Ireland) Gerard Greene	0
(Wales) Jamie Jones	4

==== Section 8 ====
Last 128; Best of 7 frames
(England) Paul Davison	1
(England) Zack Richardson	4
(England) Rory McLeod	4
(England) Brandon Sargeant	2
(England) John Astley	w/o
(Pakistan) Hamza Akbar	w/d
(Wales) David John	1
(England) Mark King	4
(Malaysia) Rory Thor	0
(England) Christopher Keogan	4
(Scotland) Alan McManus	4
(England) Andy Hicks	1
(England) Ian Burns	2
(England) Tom Ford	4
(China) Chen Zhe	2
(England) Chris Wakelin	4

Last 64; Best of 7 frames
(England) Zack Richardson	4
(England) Rory McLeod	2
(England) John Astley	4
(England) Mark King	2
(England) Christopher Keogan	1
(Scotland) Alan McManus	4
(England) Tom Ford	4
(England) Chris Wakelin	3

Last 32; Best of 7 frames
(England) Zack Richardson	4
(England) John Astley	1
(Scotland) Alan McManus	2
(England) Tom Ford	4

Last 16; Best of 7 frames
(England) Zack Richardson	1
(England) Tom Ford	4

=== Finals ===
Quarter-finals; Best of 7 frames
(England) Mark Davis	1
(England) Mark Selby	4
(England) Jimmy White	2
(Wales) Dominic Dale	4
(Thailand) Thepchaiya Un-Nooh	4
(England) David Grace	3
(Wales) Jamie Jones	1
(England) Tom Ford	4

Semi-finals; Best of 7 frames
(England) Mark Selby	4
(Wales) Dominic Dale	2
(Thailand) Thepchaiya Un-Nooh	2
(England) Tom Ford	4

Final; Best of 7 frames
(England) Mark Selby	4
(England) Tom Ford	2

== Final ==
Final: Best of 7 frames. Referee: Jan Scheers; Stadthalle, Fürth, Germany, 28 August 2016
Mark Selby; England	4–2	Tom Ford; England
85–32 (85), 13–63, 62–59, 0–76 (67), 73–31 (72), 99–5 (58)
85	Highest break	67
0	Century breaks	0
3	50+ breaks	1

== Amateur pre-qualifying ==
These matches were played in Fürth on 24–25 August 2016. All matches were best of 7 frames.

=== Round 1 ===
(Germany) Anton Woywod	0–4	(Poland) Adam Stefanow
(England) Simon Dent	4–1	(Germany) Carl Rosenberger
(Germany) Robin Otto	0–4	(England) Michael Williams
(Germany) Stefan Gerst	1–4	(Belgium) Kevin Vandevoort
(Belgium) Johny Moermans	4–3	(Switzerland) Tom Zimmermann
(England) Imran Nisar	4–0	(Romania) Dragos-Bogdan Dorojan
(England) Charlie Walters	4–2	(Belgium) Jurian Heusdens
(France) Regis D'Anna	0–4	(Poland) Marcin Nitschke
(England) Richard Beckham	2–4	(England) Daniel Ward
(Wales) Ben Jones	4–2	(Germany) Stefan Joachim
(Wales) Thomas Rees	2–4	(Turkey) Soner Sari
(Republic of Ireland) Chris Kilcoyne	w/d–w/o	(England) Farakh Ajaib
(Germany) Wolfgang Frey	4–2	(Germany) Markus Fischer
(Republic of Ireland) Greg Casey	3–4	(Republic of Ireland) Tony Corrigan
(England) Phil O'Kane	4–2	(Northern Ireland) Declan Brennan

(Germany) Peter Brehm	0–4	(England) Labeeb Ahmed
(Germany) Jonas Sprengel	0–4	(England) Adam Bobat
(England) Khan Majid	w/d–w/o	(Germany) Marcel Prakert
(England) Ashley Beal	4–1	(Germany) Nicolas Georgopoulos
(Netherlands) Kevin Chan	0–4	(Germany) Luca Kaufmann
(England) Hamim Hussain	w/o–w/d	(England) Richard Haney
(England) Ben Murphy	2–4	(England) Adam Edge
(Hong Kong) Andy Lee	4–1	(Germany) Stefan Schenk
(Germany) Andreas Hartung	4–2	(Germany) Heiko Mutz
(England) Joshua Thomond	4–1	(Germany) William Frey
(Germany) Daniel Schneider	2–4	(Wales) Jamie Clarke
(Germany) Ralph Müller	0–4	(England) Joshua Baddeley
(England) Saqib Nasir	4–0	(Germany) Ralf Günzel
(England) Brandon Sargeant	4–1	(Germany) Fabian Haken
(England) Andy Hicks	4–3	(England) Wayne Townsend

=== Round 2 ===
(England) Sean Harvey	4–0	(Netherlands) Manon Melief
(England) Jake Nicholson	1–4	(Poland) Adam Stefanow
(Germany) Richard Wienold	4–3	(England) Simon Dent
(India) Kaavya Bharath	0–4	(England) Michael Williams
(Egypt) Thomas Lancastle	3–4	(England) Luke Pinches
(Germany) Thomas Frank	0–4	(Belgium) Kevin Vandevoort
(Germany) Kilian Baur-Pantoulier	w/o–w/d	(Germany) Lukas Kleckers
(England) Oliver Brown	4–1	(Belgium) Johny Moermans
(Belgium) Tomasz Skalski	0–4	(England) Ashley Hugill
(England) Reggie Edwards	4–1	(England) Imran Nisar
(England) Ryan Causton	4–2	(England) Charlie Walters
(England) David Lilley	4–3	(Poland) Marcin Nitschke
(England) Paul Norris	3–4	(Wales) Alex Taubman
(Pakistan) Umar Ali Shaikh	0–4	(England) Daniel Ward
(Germany) Loris Lehmann	0–4	(Wales) Ben Jones
(Austria) Andreas Ploner	4–0	(England) Aaron Cook
(England) Robert Read	4–0	(Germany) Sebastian Stein
(Canada) Terence Davidson	1–4	(Turkey) Soner Sari
(England) Steven Hallworth	4–1	(England) Farakh Ajaib
(England) Zak Surety	4–0	(Germany) Wolfgang Frey
(Turkey) Ali Kirim	3–4	(Belgium) Wendy Jans
(Republic of Ireland) Stephen Bateman	w/o–w/d	(England) Louis Heathcote
(England) Ian Glover	4–0	(Republic of Ireland) Tony Corrigan
(Denmark) Hussam Al-Saffar	0–4	(England) Joshua Cooper
(Wales) Jack Bradford	4–3	(England) Phil O'Kane
(Germany) Felix Frede	4–0	(England) Labeeb Ahmed
(England) George Pragnall	4–2	(England) Adam Longley
(Thailand) Prasit Buttakham	0–4	(England) Adam Bobat

(Northern Ireland) Conor McCormack	4–0	(Germany) Norbert Hofheinz
(China) Lü Chenwei	4–0	(Germany) Marcel Prakert
(Wales) Mark Davies	w/d–w/o	(England) Ashley Beal
(England) Reanne Evans	4–0	(Germany) Matthias Porn
(England) Matthew Glasby	4–3	(Germany) Luca Kaufmann
(England) Daniel Womersley	4–2	(England) Joe Steele
(England) Matthew Day	4–0	(England) Hamim Hussain
(England) Jamie Bodle	2–4	(England) Adam Edge
(France) Didier Gaugler	0–4	(Germany) Patrick Einsle
(England) Bhavesh Sodha	2–4	(Germany) Robert Drahn
(England) Jeremy Lee	2–4	(Hong Kong) Andy Lee
(England) James Dabell	w/d–w/o	(Scotland) Michael Collumb
(Germany) Simon Lichtenberg	4–0	(Ukraine) Andrew Ivasiv
(Germany) Rolf Mahr	1–4	(Germany) Andreas Hartung
(Germany) Julian Maschmeier	0–4	(England) Lewis Gillen
(England) Daniel Devlin	4–0	(Germany) Jörg Petersen
(England) Jeff Cundy	0–4	(Northern Ireland) Gerard Greene
(Wales) Kishan Hirani	4–2	(England) Joshua Thomond
(England) Barry Pinches	4–0	(England) Patrick Whelan
(Belgium) Gert Kempenaers	2–4	(Morocco) Mourad Naitali
(Netherlands) Laurin Winters	w/o–w/d	(England) Matthew Marten
(England) Peter Lines	4–2	(Wales) Jamie Clarke
(England) Zack Richardson	4–0	(England) Joshua Baddeley
(Afghanistan) Abdullah Atmar Ghulam Jilani	0–4	(England) Saqib Nasir
(England) Stephen Kershaw	4–2	(England) Andy Symons
(Republic of Ireland) Daniel O'Regan	0–4	(England) Brandon Sargeant
(England) Manasawin Phetmalaikul	0–4	(England) Andy Hicks
(Scotland) David Charleton	0–4	(England) Mohammed Aurangzaib

=== Round 3 ===
(England) Sean Harvey	4–1	(Poland) Adam Stefanow
(Germany) Richard Wienold	0–4	(England) Michael Williams
(England) Luke Pinches	1–4	(Belgium) Kevin Vandevoort
(Germany) Kilian Baur-Pantoulier	1–4	(England) Oliver Brown
(England) Ashley Hugill	4–1	(England) Reggie Edwards
(England) Ryan Causton	0–4	(England) David Lilley
(Wales) Alex Taubman	3–4	(England) Daniel Ward
(Wales) Ben Jones	4–2	(Austria) Andreas Ploner
(England) Robert Read	4–1	(Turkey) Soner Sari
(England) Steven Hallworth	4–1	(England) Zak Surety
(Belgium) Wendy Jans	1–4	(Republic of Ireland) Stephen Bateman
(England) Ian Glover	4–0	(England) Joshua Cooper
(Wales) Jack Bradford	3–4	(Germany) Felix Frede
(England) George Pragnall	4–1	(England) Adam Bobat

(Northern Ireland) Conor McCormack	0–4	(China) Lü Chenwei
(England) Ashley Beal	4–2	(England) Reanne Evans
(England) Matthew Glasby	4–2	(England) Daniel Womersley
(England) Matthew Day	4–2	(England) Adam Edge
(Germany) Patrick Einsle	4–0	(Germany) Robert Drahn
(Hong Kong) Andy Lee	1–4	(Scotland) Michael Collumb
(Germany) Simon Lichtenberg	4–0	(Germany) Andreas Hartung
(England) Lewis Gillen	1–4	(England) Daniel Devlin
(Northern Ireland) Gerard Greene	4–2	(Wales) Kishan Hirani
(England) Barry Pinches	4–0	(Morocco) Mourad Naitali
(Netherlands) Laurin Winters	0–4	(England) Peter Lines
(England) Zack Richardson	4–3	(England) Saqib Nasir
(England) Stephen Kershaw	0–4	(England) Brandon Sargeant
(England) Andy Hicks	4–0	(England) Mohammed Aurangzaib

== Century breaks ==
=== Amateur pre-qualifying stage centuries ===
- 119 – Kishan Hirani
- 109 – Gerard Greene
- 106, 104 – Andy Hicks
- 106 – Ashley Hugill
- 105 – Ian Glover

=== Televised stage centuries ===
- 147, 141, 120 – Thepchaiya Un-Nooh
- 136, 128, 120, 102, 101 – Tom Ford
- 136, 106 – Michael Holt
- 132, 116 – Liang Wenbo
- 132 – Zhou Yuelong
- 127 – Mark Selby
- 123 – Zhao Xintong
- 121 – Ali Carter
- 120, 101, 100 – Mark Allen
- 120 – Matthew Stevens
- 118, 110 – Kurt Maflin
- 118, 105 – David Gilbert
- 112 – Joe Swail
- 111 – Li Hang
- 110 – Dominic Dale
- 109 – Andrew Higginson
- 107 – Zack Richardson
- 104 – Robbie Williams
- 104 – Jack Lisowski
- 104 – Martin O'Donnell
- 104 – Mark Davis
- 101 – Mei Xiwen
- 100 – Fergal O'Brien
