= David Lamb =

David Lamb may refer to:

- David Lamb (journalist) (1940–2016), Los Angeles Times correspondent
- David Lamb (philosopher) (born 1942), Philosopher
- Dave Lamb (David Alexander Lamb, born 1969), English actor and comedian
- David Lamb (baseball) (born 1975), American baseball player
- David Lamb (musician) (1977–2014), founder and leader of Brown Bird
