= Revista Eletrônica Estudos Hegelianos =

Academic journal in Brazil

- Discipline: Philosophy
- Language: Portuguese

Publication details
- History: 2004–present
- Frequency: Annual
- Open access: Yes
- ISO 4: Find out here

Indexing
- ISSN: 1980-8372

Links
- Journal homepage

Revista Eletrônica (de) Estudos Hegelianos (REH; English: Electronic Journal of Hegelian Studies) is a journal established in 2004 by the board members of the Sociedade Hegel Brasileira (SHB) with the aim of advancing research and scholarship on the philosophy of Hegel in Brazil.

== See also ==
- Hegel-Archiv
- Hegel Bulletin
- Hegel-Jahrbuch
- Hegel-Studien
- The Owl of Minerva
- Studia Hegeliana
- List of philosophy journals
