= Dietmar Heidemann =

German philosopher

- Born: 1967 (age 58–59)

Education
- Education: University of Cologne (PhD)
- Thesis: Kant and the problem of metaphysical idealism (1997)
- Doctoral advisor: Klaus Düsing

Philosophical work
- Era: 21st-century philosophy
- Region: Western philosophy
- School: Kantian philosophy
- Institutions: University of Luxembourg
- Main interests: German idealism, contemporary philosophy

Dietmar Hermann Heidemann (1967) is a German philosopher and Professor of Philosophy at the University of Luxembourg. He is best known for his research on Kant and German idealism. Heidemann is the editor-in-chief of Kant Yearbook.

== Books ==
- Der Begriff des Skeptizismus: Seine systematischen Formen, die pyrrhonische Skepsis und Hegels Herausforderung, erscheint Berlin/New York 2007 („Quellen und Studien zur Philosophie“, De Gruyter)
- Kant und das Problem des metaphysischen Idealismus, Berlin/New York 1998 (Kantstudien Ergänzungsheft 131, De Gruyter)

=== Edited ===
- Join or Die: Philosophical Foundation of Federalism, Berlin/Boston 2016 (zusammen mit K. Stoppenbrink; De Gruyter)
- Kant and Non-Conceptual Content, London/New York 2013 (Routledge)
- Foi et savoir dans la philosophie moderne/Glaube und Vernunft in der Philosophie der Neuzeit, Hildesheim, Zürich, New York 2013 (zusammen mit R. Weicker, Olms)
- Hegel und die Geschichte der Philosophie, Darmstadt 2007 (zusammen mit Chr. Krijnen, Wissenschaftliche Buchgesellschaft)
- Ethikbegründungen zwischen Universalismus und Relativismus, Berlin/New York 2005 (zusammen mit K. Engelhard; De Gruyter)
- Warum Kant heute? Systematische Bedeutung und Rezeption seiner Philosophie in der Gegenwart, Berlin/New York 2004 (De Gruyter Studienbuch; zusammen mit K. Engelhard)
- Probleme der Subjektivität in Geschichte und Gegenwart, Stuttgart-Bad Cannstatt 2002
