= Karen Ng =

Karen Ng may refer to:

- Karen Ng (philosopher), associate professor of philosophy at Vanderbilt University
- Karen Ng (musician), Canadian improvisational musician, teacher and event organiser
