= Andreas Arndt =

Andreas Arndt (born October 17, 1949, Wilhelmshaven) is a German philosopher and an expert in Hegel and Schleiermacher studies.

== Life ==
After graduating from Humboldtschule Wilhelmshaven in 1968, he studied philosophy and German literature in Freiburg im Breisgau and Bochum from 1968 to 1974. He completed his doctorate in 1977 at the University of Bielefeld, where he worked at the Institute of Philosophy until 1979. From 1979 to 2011, he worked at the Schleiermacher Research Center in Berlin. In 1987, he completed his habilitation at the Free University of Berlin, where he has since worked as a private lecturer and, since 1993, as an adjunct professor. From 2010 until his retirement in 2018, he was Professor of Philosophy at the Faculty of Theology at Humboldt-Universität zu Berlin. Since 2008, he has been head of the Schleiermacher Research Center at the Berlin-Brandenburg Academy of Sciences and Humanities. From 1992 to 2016, he was Chairman of the Board of the International Hegel Society (Honorary Chairman since 2016). He is also a member of the advisory board of the International Marx-Engels Foundation. Since October 2021, he has held a research professorship at the Georgian Technical University of Tbilisi. He is the co-editor of the Hegel-Jahrbuch and the series Hegel-Forschungen at Akademie-Verlag (since 2014: De Gruyter), Berlin.

Andreas Arndt was awarded honorary doctorates by Shota Meskhia State Teaching University in Zugdidi, Georgia, in 2023 and Georgian Technical University in Tbilisi in 2024.

== Works (selection) ==
=== Monographs ===
- Lenin – Politik und Philosophie, Bochum 1982.
- Karl Marx. Versuch über den Zusammenhang seiner Theorie, Bochum 1985; zweite Auflage Berlin 2011.
- Dialektik und Reflexion. Zur Rekonstruktion des Vernunftbegriffs, Hamburg 1994.
- Die Arbeit der Philosophie, Berlin 2003.
- Unmittelbarkeit, Bielefeld 2004; zweite Auflage Berlin 2013.
- Die Klassische Deutsche Philosophie nach Kant (mit Walter Jaeschke), München 2012.
- Friedrich Schleiermacher als Philosoph, Berlin und Boston 2013.
- Geschichte und Freiheitsbewusstsein. Zur Dialektik der Freiheit bei Hegel und Marx, Berlin 2015.
- Die Reformation der Revolution. Friedrich Schleiermacher in seiner Zeit, Berlin 2019.
- Freiheit, Köln 2019.
- Schleiermachers Philosophie, Hamburg 2021.
- Die Sache der Logik. Begriff und Realität bei Hegel, Hamburg 2023.
- Hegel in Marx. Studien zur dialektischen Kritik und zur Theorie der Befreiung, Berlin 2023.

=== Editorials ===
- Andreas Arndt, Christian Iber (Hrsg.): Hegels Seinslogik. Interpretationen und Perspektiven, Berlin 2000.
- Andreas Arndt, Christian Iber, Günter Kruck (Hrsg.): Hegels Lehre vom Begriff, Urteil und Schluss, Berlin 2006.
- Andreas Arndt, Günter Kruck (Hg.): Hegels Lehre vom Wesen, Berlin und Boston 2016
- Andreas Arndt, Jure Zovko (Hrsg.): Hegels Anthropologie, Berlin und Boston 2017.
- Andreas Arndt, Thurid Bender (Hrsg.): Das Böse denken. Zum Problem des Bösen in der Klassischen Deutschen Philosophie, Tübingen 2021.

=== Contributions to anthologies ===
- "... das Böse ist nur außer dem Werden des höchsten Gutes". Die Relativität des Bösen bei Schleiermacher. Mohr Siebeck. 2021. pp. 175–185. ISBN 978-3161600647.
- Dialektik und Urteilskraft. LIT. 2021. pp. 191–203. ISBN 9783643913753.
- "Wir sind nie Subjekte gewesen". Anmerkungen zum "Tod des Subjekts". BIS-Verlag. 2021. pp. 215–231. ISBN 9783814223919.

=== Editorial board ===
- Hegel-Studien since 2001
- Hegel-Jahrbuch
- Das Argument since 2006
- Studia hegeliana since 2014
- Revista Eletrônica Estudos Hegelianos since 2014
