= Hermens =

Hermens is a surname. Notable people with the surname include:

- Ferdinand A. Hermens, German-American political scientist and economist
- Jos Hermens (born 1950), Dutch long-distance runner and founder
