= Ali Asghar Mosleh =

Iranian philosopher

Ali Asghar Mosleh Fasaei
- علی‌اصغر مصلح فسایی (Persian)
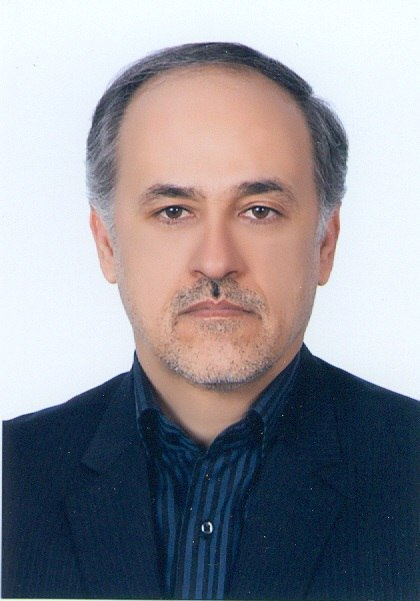
- Born: 1962 (age 63–64); Iran

Philosophical work
- Era: 21st century Philosophy
- Region: Western Philosophy
- School: Continental
- Main interests: Critique of the Iranian Culture and Thought

Ali Asghar Mosleh Fasaei (born 1962) (Persian: علی‌اصغر مصلح فسایی) is an Iranian philosopher and professor of philosophy at Allameh Tabataba'i University. He is known for his expertise on philosophy of culture. Mosleh holds the presidency of The Iranian Society of Intercultural Philosophy (ISIPH) and Research Institute for Contemporary Culture at Institute for Humanities and Cultural Studies. He was the Dean of ATU's Faculty of Persian Literature and Foreign Languages (PLFL), and Acting-Dean of ATU's Faculty of Theology and Islamic Knowledge (2015-2017). He is associate member of the Iranian Academy of Science. (2023).

== Bibliography ==
=== As author ===
- Mosleh, Ali Asghar (2020) Truth and power (Vol. 1), Tehran: Nashre Ney
- Mosleh, Ali Asghar (2021). Convergence and Divergence: An Intercultural and Interreligious Dialogue. Verlag Traugott Bautz GmbH. p. 196. ISBN 978-3-9594-8507-4.
- Mosleh, Ali Asghar (2018) the Other; A Research on Intercultural Thought and the Ethics of Dialogue. Tehran: Elmi Publication
- Mosleh, Ali Asghar (2008) The Origin of Intercultural Insight and Philosophy
- Mosleh, Ali Asghar (2008) The Philosophies of Existence, Tehran: publishing organization for Institute of Islamic culture and Thought
- Mosleh, Ali Asghar (2013) Quest and Dialogue: Essays on Culture. Tehran: Elmi Publication
- Mosleh, Ali Asghar (2009) Frankfurt School's critical theory and a critique of modern culture ISSN 2423-4419, 2251-7960
- Mosleh, Ali Asghar (2013) Georg Wilhelm Friedrich Hegel, Tehran: Elmi Publication
- Mosleh, Ali Asghar (2014) Allameh Tabatabai`s “Edrakate Eetebari” and Philosophy of Culture, Tehran: Ruzegare No Publication
- Mosleh, Ali Asghar (2014) Tajrobeh Vahed (Single Experience), Tehran: Institute for humanities and cultural studies (IHCS) and Elmi Publication
- Mosleh, Ali Asghar (2015) Philosophy of Culture, Tehran: Elmi Publication
- Mosleh, Ali Asghar (2016), The Question concerning the truth of Man: A Comparative Study in Ibn al-Arabi`s and Heidegger`s Thought, Tehran: Taha Publication
- Mosleh, Ali Asghar (2011) A Discussion about the Future of Islamic Wisdom ISSN 2383-0689, 2383-0697
- Die Frage nach dem Verhältnis von Vernunft und Geschichte bei Hegel und Rumi, Hegel-Jahrbuch 2014 (1) doi:10.1515/hgjb-2014-0159
- Mosleh, Ali Asghar, and Abbas Jong (2021) Iran and COVID-19: Institutional Configurations. In COVID-19 and Governance. Edited by Jan Nederveen Pieterse, Haeran Lim and Habibul Khondker. London and New York: Routledge

=== As editor ===
- Mosleh, Ali Asghar (ed.) (2021) The possibility of Rereading intercultural philosophy in Rumi's thought with emphasis on the views of Adher Mall
- Mosleh, Ali Asghar (ed.) (2017) Proceedings of the International Conference on the Future of Culture, Tehran: Allameh Tabataba`I University Press
- Die Sehnsucht zum Wahren im Sufismus, In Guido Kreis & Joachim Bromand (eds.), Was Sich Nicht Sagen Lässt: Das Nicht-Begriffliche in Wissenschaft, Kunst Und Religion. Akademie Verlag. pp. 633–646 (2010)
- Mosleh, Ali Asghar (ed.) (2013) 'Non-Being' in Heidegger's Thought and Chinese Philosophy ISSN 2423-4419, 2251-7960
- Mosleh, Ali Asghar (ed.) (2014) Intercultural Philosophy & The Contemporary World, Tehran: Hekmat Publishing Company

== See also ==
- Intellectual Movements in Iran
- Iranian philosophy
- Religious intellectualism in Iran
