= An Introduction to Hegel: Freedom, Truth and History =

1991 book by Stephen Houlgate

- Authors: Stephen Houlgate
- Language: English
- Subject: Hegel
- Publisher: Blackwell
- Publication date: 2005 (2nd ed)
- Publication place: United Kingdom
- Media type: Print (Hardcover and Paperback)
- Pages: 332
- ISBN: 978-0-631-23063-2

An Introduction to Hegel: Freedom, Truth and History is a book by the philosopher Stephen Houlgate in which the author provides an introduction to the philosophy of Hegel.

== Reception ==
David Kolb, Howard Williams and Terry Pinkard reviewed the book. Simon Lumsden calls it "the most straightforward introduction to Hegel's thought."
