= Geisecke =

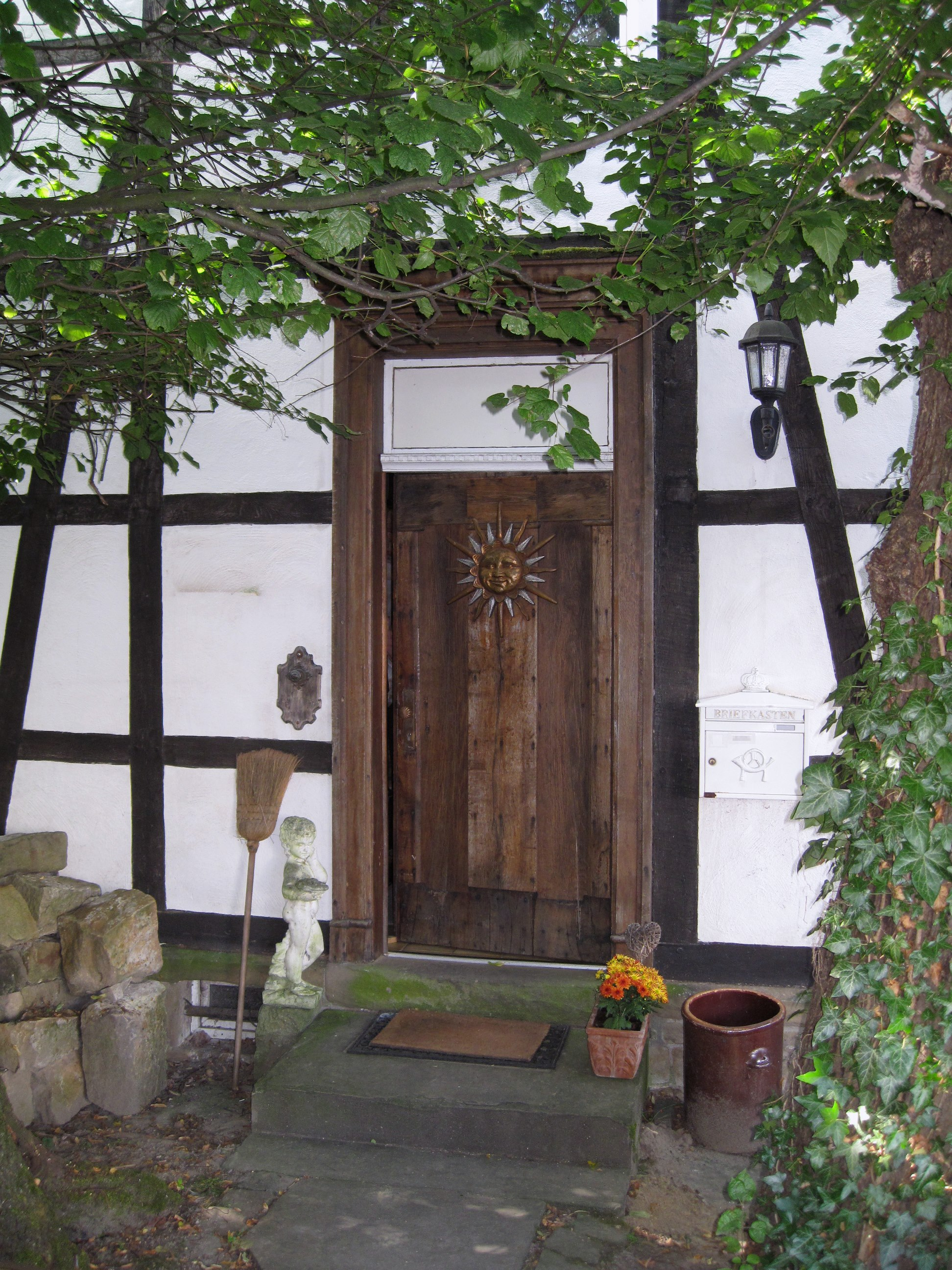
Voss'scher Hof, frame house of 1823 in Schwerte-Geisecke.

Geisecke is a city district of the city Schwerte in North Rhine-Westphalia, Germany. On 31 December 2012, it had a population of 3,009 inhabitants. Geisecke is located north of the Ruhr near the Sauerland. The city center of Schwerte is a few kilometers to the west.

== Geography ==
=== Location ===
Geisecke is located north of the Ruhr on the edge of the Sauerland. The city center of Schwerte is situated a few kilometers to the west.

=== Neighboring Areas ===
Geisecke borders the Dortmund district of Lichtendorf to the north, the municipality of Holzwickede (with the village of Hengsen) to the northeast, the town of Iserlohn (with the district of Rheinen) to the southeast, and the district of Gänsewinkel in Schwerte to the west.

== History ==
Geisecke was historically part of a rural district called Geseke in the late Middle Ages and Early Modern Period. It belonged to the County of Mark within the parish and district of Schwerte. According to the treasure book of the County of Mark from 1486, the 15 taxpaying households in the area paid between one and six Rhenish gulden in taxes.

In the 19th century, the rural community of Geisecke was incorporated into the district of Westhofen in the Dortmund district in the Prussian Province of Westphalia. On 1 April 1887, it became part of the newly created Hörde district. In 1885, the rural community of Geisecke had a total area of 411 hectares, with 158 hectares of farmland, 20 hectares of meadows, 7 hectares of woods, and 263 residents living in 34 houses.

Until the late 19th century, agriculture dominated the local economy, but the industrialization process gradually shifted the local workforce.

During the Second World War, Geisecke was significantly affected by the flood caused by the explosion of the Möhne Reservoir in May 1943.

Post-war recovery led to a period of rapid residential development and infrastructure expansion. Schools, kindergartens, and sports facilities were established in the area.

On 1 January 1975, as part of a municipal territorial reform, Geisecke was incorporated into the city of Schwerte.

Since 1975, Geisecke has been recognized as one of the preferred residential areas in the region.

=== Rail Yard ===
In 1912, a shifting yard was established in Geisecke following the construction of a railway maintenance depot in nearby Schwerte-East. Initially consisting of only two tracks, it expanded rapidly, and by October 1913, it was a massive railway yard with 20 track pairs. At its peak, 2000 wagons were managed daily, and 140 employees worked at the site. It became one of the most modern freight yards in Western Germany. By 1916, it reached its largest size with 42 track pairs, covering over 2.8 km in length and 300 meters in width.

During the Second World War, the yard was revived in 1938-1939, and it became one of the largest freight yards in the Deutsche Reichsbahn network.

== Population Development ==
Geisecke (pre-1975)

Year	Population
1961	1007
1970	1005
1974	1387

Geisecke (post-1975)

Year	Population
1987	2495
2008	3000

== Water Supply and Water Management ==
Geisecke plays an important role in the regional water supply. The entire area is designated as a water protection zone. The Ruhr meadows region, particularly Geisecke and Westhofen, supplies drinking water to around one million people. An important site related to this is the Hengsen Hydroelectric Power Plant, located near Geisecke.

== Sights ==
Geisecke and its surroundings offer several historical and natural attractions:

- Voss'scher Hof: A frame house dating back to 1823, located in Schwerte-Geisecke.
- Haus Rutenborn: A historic water castle built in the 14th century.
- Bahnwald Nature Reserve: A protected area that is home to diverse flora and fauna.
- Hengsen Reservoir: A scenic lake, also known as the Geiseckersee, used for recreational activities.
- Wellenbad: A local pool offering family-friendly amenities.
- 130er-Denkmal am Kellerkopf: A monument located near the Geisecker Oberdorf, commemorating important historical events.
