= Ann Garry =

American feminist philosopher and professor

- Occupation: Professor

Education
- Education: Monmouth College, B.A.; University of Chicago, M.A.; University of Maryland, Ph.D.

Philosophical work
- School: Feminism
- Institutions: California State University, Los Angeles, University of Waterloo, the University of Southern California, University of California, Los Angeles
- Main interests: Feminist philosophy, intersectionality, philosophical method

Ann Garry is an American feminist philosopher. She is professor of philosophy, emerita, at California State University, Los Angeles (CSULA). While at CSULA, Garry was the founding director of the Center for the Study of Genders and Sexualities, and also served several terms as the chair of the Department of Philosophy. She has also held several visiting appointments, including serving as the Humphrey Chair of Feminist Philosophy at the University of Waterloo and Fulbright lectureships at the University of Tokyo and Eötvös Loránd University in Budapest. Although Garry no longer teaches full-time, she continues to work with graduate students.

== Education and career ==
Garry received her bachelor's degree from Monmouth College in 1965, graduating magna cum laude. She went on to receive a master's degree from the University of Chicago in 1966, and a PhD in Philosophy with a dissertation focused on visualizing from the University of Maryland in 1970.

Garry accepted a position as assistant professor of philosophy at CSULA in 1969, before being promoted to associate professor in 1977, and full Professor in 1983 She is now professor emerita. While a professor at CSULA, Garry served the department in a variety of roles, including acting as department chair for several terms across multiple decades.

Besides her permanent academic appointments, Garry has served as a Visiting assistant professor of philosophy at UCLA in the Spring semester of 1977, and served as a Visiting associate professor of philosophy at the University of Southern California in the fall of 1978, and 1979 (where she would later serve as a visiting full Professor of Philosophy in 1988.) Garry has also served eight terms as a visiting full Professor of Philosophy at UCLA.

Besides for her academic appointments, Garry has contributed to her field in a variety of important ways, including being one of the founders of Hypatia: A Journal of Feminist Philosophy, and a founder of the Society for Women in Philosophy, Pacific Division. She also serves as editor for topics related to feminist philosophy for both the Stanford Encyclopedia of Philosophy and PhilPapers.

== Research areas ==
Garry began her graduate studies during the heyday of anglophone analytic philosophy, and many of her original research interests reflect that. Her original focuses included epistemology, analytic metaphysics, philosophy of language, etc. As the New Left and the women's movement began to impact academia, Garry's research interests focused on feminism, and at re-examining traditional philosophy through a feminist point of view. Her current interests focus on intersectionality, the way in which various systems of oppression and privilege are fundamentally intertwined and shape each other. Garry was an early entrant in to the field of feminist philosophy, and was responsible for a significant amount of foundational work in the field, including the development of early courses in feminist philosophy, and at early attempts at integrating feminist philosophy into other philosophical areas. Garry was also one of the first philosophers to question whether pornography was a significant cause of gender-based violence.

== Publications ==
Garry has edited one anthology, Women, Knowledge, and Reality: Explorations in Feminist Philosophy, which is a collection of 25 essays intended to highlight the ways in which feminist philosophy (and feminist philosophers) engage, critique, and challenge traditional fields of philosophy across the board. The anthology has multiple editions, including a Russian translation. Garry collaborated with fellow philosophers Serene Khader and Alison Stone on a volume titled Routledge Companion to Feminist Philosophy, published in 2017. Garry has also published a large number of refereed book chapters, journal articles, and reviews, primarily dealing with topics related to feminism, intersectionality, philosophical and feminist methods, and sex and gender.
