= Hegel Bulletin =

- Discipline: Philosophy
- Language: English
- Edited by: Ivan Boldyrev, Sebastian Stein, Joshua Wretzel

Publication details
- History: 1980–present
- Publisher: Cambridge University Press
- Frequency: triannual

Standard abbreviations
- ISO 4: Hegel Bull.

Indexing
- ISSN: 2051-5367 (print); 2051-5375 (web)

Links
- Journal homepage

Hegel Bulletin (previously Bulletin of the Hegel Society of Great Britain) is a triannual peer-reviewed academic journal covering the thought of Georg Wilhelm Friedrich Hegel published by Hegel Society of Great Britain (HSGB). It was established in 1980. The editors are Ivan Boldyrev, Sebastian Stein, and Joshua Wretzel. The Bulletin was published by the HSGB itself until 2013, but is now being published by Cambridge University Press.

== List of Editors ==
- Z. A. Pelczynski (1980–1985)
- Robert Bernasconi (1986–1987)
- J. M. Bernstein (1988–1990)
- Robert Stern (philosopher) (1991–1997)
- Stephen Houlgate (1998–2006)
- Katerina Deligiorgi (2007–2015)
- Alison Stone (2016–2019)
- Christoph Schuringa (2016–2025)

== See also ==
- Studia Hegeliana
- The Owl of Minerva (journal)
- Hegel-Studien
- Hegel-Jahrbuch
- List of philosophy journals
