= Sebastian Stein =

Philosophy researcher

- Born: 1980 (age 45–46)

Academic background
- Education: University of Heidelberg (MA); University of Oxford (PhD)
- Thesis: The Objectivity of Freedom: A Systematic Commentary on the Introduction to Hegel’s Philosophy of Right (2012)
- Doctoral advisor: Michael Inwood
- Other advisor: Julia Peters

Academic work
- Era: Contemporary philosophy
- Region: Western philosophy
- School or tradition: German Idealism
- Institutions: Heidelberg University
- Website: https://www.uni-heidelberg.de/fakultaeten/philosophie/philsem/personal/stein.html

Sebastian Stein (born 1980) is a philosophy researcher at Heidelberg University.

== Life and works ==
Stein completed a B.A. (Honours) at the University of Manchester in 2004, followed by a Magister Artium at the University of Heidelberg in 2007. In 2012, they earned a D.Phil. from the University of Oxford with a dissertation titled The objectivity of freedom: A systematic commentary on the introduction to Hegel’s Philosophy of Right. From 2012 to 2018, they held teaching positions at the universities of Oxford, Heidelberg, and Tübingen. Since 2018, they have been a DFG (German Research Foundation) Postdoctoral Fellow at the University of Heidelberg, working on a project in meta-philosophy under the supervision of Julia Peters.

=== Selected publications ===
==== Editorials ====
- Interpreting Hegel's Phenomenology of Spirit: Expositions and Critique of Contemporary Readings. New York: Routledge. 2021. doi:10.4324/9780429030192. ISBN 978-0-429-03019-2.
- Hegel's Encyclopedia of the Philosophical Sciences: A Critical Guide. Cambridge Critical Guides. Cambridge: Cambridge University Press. 2021. doi:10.1017/9781108592000. ISBN 978-1-108-47198-5.
- Hegel's Encyclopedic System. New York: Routledge. 2021. doi:10.4324/9780429022555. ISBN 978-0-429-02255-5.
- Hegel and Contemporary Practical Philosophy: Beyond Kantian Constructivism. Routledge. 2020. doi:10.4324/9781351205559. ISBN 978-1-351-20555-9.
- Hegel's Political Philosophy: On the Normative Significance of Method and System. OUP Academic. 2017-05-04. doi:10.1093/o.

==== Articles ====
- "Hegel's Monarch, the Concept and the Limits of Syllogistic Reasoning". Hegel Bulletin. 37 (1): 145–155. 2016. doi:10.1017/hgl.2016.8. ISSN 2051-5367.
- "Hegel's Twofold Critique of Empiricism: Cognition, Ontology and the Question of Universality". Revista Eletrônica Estudos Hegelianos. 13 (22). 2016-09-12. ISSN 1980-8372.
