= Paul Kevenhörster =

German political scientist

Paul Johannes Kevenhörster (born 5 June 1941 in Schwerte, Province of Westphalia) is Professor Emeritus of Political Science at the Westphalian William's University of Muenster in Germany. His work focuses on politics in Japan, municipal government and international development co-operation. He has served in academia as well as in a government agency and as consultant to a variety of organisations. Since 1966 Paul Kevenhörster is married to Gisela Drerup. They have three daughters, Uta, Eva and Ina, three granddaughters and a grandson, Milla and Emma Kevenhörster, Sophie and Lucas Russell.

== Education ==
Kevenhörster studied economics and social sciences at the universities of Bonn, Hamburg and Cologne (all of them in Germany). He graduated from the University of Cologne in 1965 (Master of Economics) and 1966 (Master of Business Administration). Following further studies at the Pennsylvania State University in State College, PA and the Sophia University in Tokyo (Japan) Kevenhörster completed his Ph.D. in 1968 with a dissertation on the political system of Japan at the University of Cologne (Germany). The supervisor of his Ph.D. work was Ferdinand A. Hermens. Kevenhörster's education was completed by the study of Japanese Language at the University of Bochum, Germany (1989–1992).

== Career ==
Between 1967 and 1973 Kevenhörster was a research fellow, initially with the Konrad Adenauer Foundation (WIKAS), later on with the Institute for Communication Research and Planning (IWUG) and the GMD. His Habilitation, the functional equivalent among German academics to service as assistant professor, was completed in 1973 at the Rhenish Frederic William's University of Bonn with a major study on the council system as an instrument to control political and economic power. Following this he was appointed associate professor of political science at TU Braunschweig (Germany) in 1974. In the same year Kevenhörster was appointed to full/ tenured professorship of political science in Muenster, initially with the Teachers' Training College.

Since 1980 he has held the same position with the Westphalian William's University of Münster. Between 1982 and 1988 Kevenhörster served as Secretary General (Kurator) of the German Foundation for International Development (DSE) in Berlin, which is now part of Inwent. More recently he was on the Board of Trustees with the Institute for Asian Affairs, Hamburg (1993–2006). In 1994, he was one of the mediators of a dispute between the African National Congress and Zulus in South Africa. From 1998 to 2001 Kevenhörster was Director of the Institute of Political Science, Münster. Between 2002 and 2004 he belonged to the Advisory Board of the German Institute for the Study of Japan (DIJ), Tokyo. Since 2006 he is professor emeritus. However, Kevenhörster still serves as member of the editorial board for the Journal 'Japan aktuell - Journal of Current Japanese Affairs'.

== Publications ==
Kevenhörster's numerous publications (the Library of Congress holds 21 titles) include the following books:

- Das politische System Japans. Cologne and Opladen: Westdeutscher Verlag, 1969.
- Wirtschaft und Politik in Japan. Interessengruppen, politische Meinungsbildung und wirtschaftspolitische Entscheidung. Wiesbaden: Franz Steiner, 1973.
- Das Rätesystem als Instrument zur Kontrolle politischer und wirtschaftlicher Macht. Cologne and Opladen: Westdeutscher Verlag, 1974.
- Zeitökonomie im Management. Cologne and Opladen: Westdeutscher Verlag, 1974 (with Wulf Schönbohm).
- Politik im elektronischen Zeitalter. Politische Wirkungen der Informationstechnik. Baden-Baden: Nomos Verlag, 1984.
- Politik und Gesellschaft in Japan, Mannheim: Duden/ Brockhaus, 1993.
- Japan's umfassende Sicherheit. Hamburg: Institut für Asienkunde, 2003 (with Dirk Nabers).
- Politikwissenschaft, vol 1: Entscheidungen und Strukturen der Politik. 3rd ed., Wiesbaden: VS Verlag für Sozialwissenschaften, 2008.
- Politikwissenschaft, vol. 2: Ergebnisse und Wirkungen der Politik. Wiesbaden, VS Verlag für Sozialwissenschaften, 2006.
- Japan. Wirtschaft - Gesellschaft - Politik. 2nd ed., Wiesbaden: VS Verlag für Sozialwissenschaften, 2010 (with Werner Pascha and Karen Shire).

Some of his papers published in renowned journals are available on the internet, e.g.

- 'Das Schweigen des Parlaments' (in German, publ. by Die Bundeszentrale für politische Bildung)
- Japan's Development Policy Put to the Test. Evaluations and Their Consequences. (Japan aktuell 3/2006, in German: Die Entwicklungspolitik Japans auf dem Prüfstand: Evaluationen und ihre Folgen, English abstract)
- 'Der gefesselte Riese. Innenpolitische Barrieren aussenpolitischer Strategien', in German, published by Deutsche Institut für Japanstudien (German Institute for Japanese Studies)
