= Serene Khader =

American philosopher

Serene J. Khader is an American moral and political philosopher and feminist theorist. She is Professor and Jay Newman Chair in the Philosophy of Culture at Brooklyn College, City University of New York and the CUNY Graduate Center. Her main areas of research are political philosophy, moral psychology, feminist philosophy, global justice and development ethics. In April 2017 she was elected vice-president of the Human Development and Capabilities Association.

Much of her work is about decolonial, transnational, postcolonial, and global feminisms. She addresses the universalism/relativism debate. Khader's view is that it is possible to oppose gender oppression across the world without taking Western culture to be the model.

She is known for her work on autonomy and agency under conditions of oppression. She argues that relational conceptions of autonomy reinforce oppression by subjecting women to unjustified paternalism. She applies these arguments to cases where women in the global South are thought to have "adaptive preferences." She argues that what seem to be cases of women internalizing their oppression are in fact self-interested adaptations to unjust conditions, and explains why women who have internalized their oppression should still be consulted in interventions to change their lives and communities.

Khader exposes the myth that microfinance programs empower women in the third world. Building on work by Marilyn Waring and other feminist theorists, she argues that women are not an under-tapped resource, but are in fact already over-utilised but that more must be done to recognise the unpaid work they already do rather than burdening them with further entrepreneurial responsibilities.

== Education ==
Khader has a BA in philosophy and international studies from the University of Oregon (2002) and a PhD in philosophy and a graduate certificate in women's studies from Stony Brook University (2008).

== Works ==
=== As author ===
- Adaptive Preferences and Women's Empowerment, Oxford University Press, 2011, ISBN 978-0199777877
- Decolonizing Universalism: A Transnational Feminist Ethic, Oxford University Press, 2018, ISBN 978-0190664190
- Faux Feminism: Why We Fall for White Feminism and How We Can Stop, Beacon Press, 2024, ISBN 978-0-8070-0827-0

=== As editor ===
- The Routledge Companion to Feminist Philosophy, co-editor with Ann Garry and Alison Stone, Routledge, 2017, ISBN 978-1138795921
