= Internationale Hegel-Gesellschaft =

German learned and academic society

- Formation: 1953
- Founder: Wilhelm Raimund Beyer
- Type: Learned Society
- Purpose: “"to care for Hegel's spiritual legacy, critically to research and present his philosophy in its historical development and in its manifold relations to preceding and succeeding theories”
- Headquarters: Berlin
- Location: Germany
- Origins: 1953-present
- Chairman: Andreas Arndt
- Key people: Brady Bowman; Myriam Gerharhard; Jure Zovko
- Publication: Hegel Jahrbuch
- Website: https://hegel-gesellschaft.org/

The Internationale Hegel-Gesellschaft e.V. (International Hegel Society) is the oldest learned society dedicated to Hegel's intellectual heritage. It was initially founded by Wilhelm Raimund Beyer in 1953 as the Deutsche Hegel-Gesellschaft (German Hegel Society).

Beyer's efforts were supported by the City of Nürnberg in its celebration of the fact that Hegel taught in Nürnberg and that Hegel's wife, Marie Tucher, was the daughter of a well-known Nürnberg family.

== History ==
The society was initially founded by Wilhelm Raimund Beyer in 1953 as the Deutsche Hegel-Gesellschaft (German Hegel Society) at the city of Nuremberg, to bring together scholars from both sides of the Iron Curtain. The society acquired its current name as the Internationale Hegel-Gesellschaft in the second international congress of 1958.

Beyer's efforts were supported by the City of Nürnberg in its celebration of the fact that Hegel taught in Nürnberg and that Hegel's wife, Marie Tucher, was the daughter of a well-known Nürnberg family.

== Activities ==
The society currently supports over a thousand members from its Berlin headquarters. The International Hegel Society holds the “International Hegel Conference” every other year, documenting its proceedings in the Hegel Jahrbuch (Hegel Yearbook) which is available at Akademie Verlag, Berlin.

== Board members ==
The founder of the International Hegel Society, Wilhelm Raimund Beyer, was chairman of the company until 1982, and since then, until his death in 1990, he was honorary chairman. Since then:

- 1953 - 1982: Wilhelm Raimund Beyer (Chairman)
- 1982 - 1992: Heinz Kimmerle, Wolfgang Lefevre, Rudolf W. Meyer
- 1992 - 2004: Andreas Arndt (chairman), Karol Bal and Henning Ottmann
- 2004 - 2012: Andreas Arndt (chairman), Paul Cruysberghs and Andrzej Przylebski
- 2012 - 2016: Andreas Arndt (chairman), Myriam Gerhard and Jure Zovko
- 2016 - present: Andreas Arndt (chairman), Myriam Gerhard, Jure Zovko and Brady Bowman

== See also ==
- Hegel Society of Great Britain
- Hegel Society of America
- Internationale Hegel-Vereinigung
- Centre de recherche et de documentation sur Hegel
- Hegel-Archiv
