= Zbigniew Pełczyński =

Polish-British academic (1925–2021)

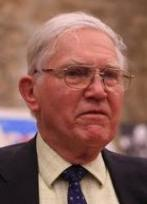
- Pełczyński in 2009
- Born: 29 December 1925; Grodzisk Mazowiecki, Poland
- Died: 22 June 2021 (aged 95)
- Awards: Order of the British Empire, Order of Polonia Restituta

Academic background
- Education: University of St Andrews; University of Oxford
- Thesis: Hegel's Minor Political Works (1956)
- Doctoral advisor: Michael Foster

Academic work
- Discipline: Political science Philosophy
- Sub-discipline: Political philosophy Hegel
- Institutions: University of Oxford; Pembroke College, Oxford
- Notable students: Bill Clinton; Viktor Orbán; Radosław Sikorski; Walter Isaacson

Zbigniew Pełczyński (Polish pronunciation: [ˈzbʲigɲɛf pɛwˈʈ͡ʂɨj̃skʲi], 29 December 1925 – 22 June 2021) was a Polish-British political philosopher and academic. He taught politics at Pembroke College, Oxford, from 1957 to 1992, and was later an Emeritus Fellow of the college. Pełczyński was instrumental in providing opportunities for scholars from Poland and other post-communist countries to study at British universities, especially at Oxford and Cambridge.

== Early life and education ==
Pełczyński was born in Grodzisk Mazowiecki, Poland in December 1925. He fought in the 1944 Warsaw Uprising and was taken prisoner by the Germans. After the war Pełczyński settled in Britain, where he attended St. Andrews University in Scotland from 1946 to 1949. He obtained a BPhil degree in politics at The Queen's College, Oxford in 1951. In 1956, he completed his D.Phil. thesis on Hegel's minor political works at the University of Oxford under the supervision of Michael Foster.

== Academic career ==
At Oxford, Pełczyński taught at Trinity College from 1953, then at Balliol College and Merton College from 1955, before settling at Pembroke College in 1957. After 1956, Pełczyński made regular visits to Poland and was instrumental in developing several programmes for the education of students from communist Europe at Oxford. In 1982, he was instrumental in establishing a scholarship program for Polish students at Oxford. Then in 1986, through collaboration with the Hungarian-American philanthropist George Soros, who earlier had established the Open Society Foundations, scholarships became available for Hungarian students at Oxford and the Stefan Batory Foundation was established in Poland. The programme widened with participation from Cambridge University, Manchester University, and other British universities.

In the United States, Pełczyński became well known for having been the politics tutor at Oxford University for the Rhodes Scholar and future President Bill Clinton (in 1968). Other famous students include prime minister of Hungary Viktor Orbán, Polish Minister of Foreign Affairs Radek Sikorski and journalist and biographer Walter Isaacson. From 1966 until the early 1980s, Pełczyński dined regularly at Pembroke with the university chancellor Harold Macmillan.

Pełczyński was an honorary member of the Polish academic society Collegium Invisibile, a prestigious institution that offers tuition for outstanding Polish students.

== Public and political activity ==
In 1990s Pełczyński was advising the Constitutional Committee of the Polish Sejm (lower chamber of the parliament), which was working on the new Constitution of the Republic of Poland. He was an advisor to the Chief of the Chancellery of the Prime Minister of Poland on government institutional reforms and was a member of Prime Minister's Council on the education of civil servants. He was consulting the European Economic Union and the OECD on government reforms and public administration in Poland.

He was the founder and a chairman of the Stefan Batory Trust in Oxford, and a member of the Polonia Aid Foundation Trust in London. In 1988, he helped George Soros establish the Stefan Batory Foundation.

In 1994 Pełczyński founded the School for Young Social and Political Leaders in Warsaw (initially as a Stefan Batory Foundation programme). The organization, which subsequently changed its name to the School for Leaders Society, states as one of its goals "creating social capital based on leadership".

== Published works ==
- Hegel's political writings translated by T. M. Knox; with an introductory essay by Z. A. Pełczyński. (1964; 1998)
- Hegel's political philosophy: problems and perspectives: a collection of new essays edited by Z. A. Pełczyński. (1971; 1975)
- The History of Poland since 1863 R. F. Leslie ... et al.; edited by R. F. Leslie. (1980)
- Poland: The Road From Communism "Special R. B. McCallum lecture, 29 May 1982." (1982)
- Conceptions of liberty in political philosophy edited by Zbigniew Pełczyński and John N. Gray. (1984)
- The state and civil society: studies in Hegel's political philosophy (1984)
- Wolność, państwo, społeczeństwo: Hegel a problemy współczesnej filozofii politycznej (1998)

A biography of Pełczyński by his former student David McAvoy was published in 2012: Zbigniew Pelczynski: A Life Remembered (Guilford, Surrey: Grosvenor House Publishing, 2012).

== Sources ==
- Houlgate, Stephen (2022), "In Memoriam Zbigniew Andrzej Pełczyński OBE (29 December 1925–22 June 2021)", Hegel Bulletin, 43 (2): 157–166, doi:10.1017/hgl.2022.10
