= Centre de recherche et de documentation sur Hegel =

Research center at the University of Poitiers, France

The Centre de recherche et de documentation sur Hegel (Research Center for the Writings of Hegel and Marx) was established at the Philosophy Department of the University of Poitiers in 1969. Its founding, under Professor Jacques D'Hondt, was a significant event in the French philosophical field. This center attempted to coordinate the research of an objective, scientific and philosophical nature on the origins and ideas of the theologian Hegel and the atheist Marx.

The idea for this Center appeared around a Seminar of Jean Hyppolite, Professor of the College of France, during conversations between Jean Hyppolite and Jacques D’Hondt. Their proposal was supported by George Canguilhem and materialized within a broader intent to decentralize French philosophical research between the College of France, the University of Paris and the University of Poitiers.

The death of Jean Hyppolite in 1969, however, deprived the Research Center of its Parisian anchor.

Its first convention in November, 1969 included Professors D’Hondt, Pucelle, Delhomme and Garaudy, of the Philosophy Department of University of Poitiers, and other notable researchers, including Mssrs. Dubarle, Bruaire, Sichirollo, Bess, Garniron, Guillaumaud, Hoffmann, Janicaud, Méthais, Planty, Ricci, Vadée, Mrs. Jalley and Miss Thomas. Other associates included Mssrs. Doz, Saintillan, Large, Wetzel, Bourdin, Draper, Gauvin, Olivier, Francisci, Fleischmann, Mrs. Königson and Mrs. Draper-Josa.

In 1975, the Professor Planty succèeded J. D’Hondt. J. D’Hondt's final seminar on Hegel and Marx was completed in 1981. Professor Jean-Louis L'Baron succeeded Professor Planty in 1991.

Around this timeframe the USSR had fallen, and Marxist studies significantly declined in the West. The Research Center for the Writings of Hegel and Marx ceased to exist in 1998, and was replaced by the Research center on Hegel and German Idealism.

== See also ==
- Hegel Society of Great Britain
- Hegel Society of America
- Internationale Hegel-Gesellschaft
- Internationale Hegel-Vereinigung
- Hegel-Archiv
