= Studia Hegeliana =

Academic journal

- Discipline: Philosophy
- Language: Spanish, English, German, French, Italian, Portuguese

Publication details
- History: 2015–present
- Frequency: Annual
- Open access: Yes
- ISO 4: Find out here

Indexing
- ISSN: 2444-0809 (print); 2792-176X (web)

Links
- Journal homepage; {{{link1-name}}}

Studia Hegeliana (Spanish: Revista de la Sociedad Española de Estudios sobre Hegel) is the official academic journal of the Spanish Society for Hegelian Studies, published by the University of Málaga. Spanish Society for Hegelian Studies is an organization established in 1996 to foster the study of Hegel’s philosophy. The Society is dedicated to exploring Hegel’s thought within the broader framework of German idealism, its role in the history of philosophy, and its ongoing relevance to contemporary philosophical and cultural movements. Reflecting this mission, the journal publishes scholarly articles focused on these themes. Its primary audience consists of specialists and researchers in idealist philosophy.

== See also ==
- Hegel-Studien
- Hegel-Archiv
- Hegel Bulletin
- Hegel-Jahrbuch
- The Owl of Minerva
- Revista Eletrônica Estudos Hegelianos
