= Katerina Deligiorgi =

Professor of philosophy at the University of Sussex

Academic background
- Education: University of Essex (PhD)
- Thesis: Divine Finitude: The Absolute in Hegel's Philosophy (1995)

Academic work
- Era: Contemporary philosophy
- Region: Western philosophy
- School or tradition: Kantianism
- Institutions: University of Sussex
- Website: www.sussex.ac.uk/profiles/198873

Katerina Deligiorgi is a professor of philosophy at the University of Sussex.

== Biography ==
Deligiorgi obtained her PhD in 1995 from the University of Essex, for a thesis on Hegel's philosophy. She became editor of the Hegel Bulletin in 2007 and oversaw its transition to Cambridge University Press in 2013.

Although Kant and Hegel remain core areas of her academic research and analysis of German idealism and its legacy, Deligiorgi has also written extensively on the philosophy of Friedrich Schiller.

Deligiorgi has consistently sought to engage with a wider audience on the topics of her academic research, enlightenment, autonomy, morality and aesthetic experience.

== Selected publications ==
- Deligiorgi, Katerina (2012). The Scope of Autonomy: Kant and the Morality of Freedom. doi:10.1093/acprof:oso/9780199646159.001.0001. ISBN 978-0-19-964615-9.
- Deligiorgi, Katerina (2012). Kant and the Culture of Enlightenment. SUNY Press. doi:10.1515/9780791483145. ISBN 978-0-7914-8314-5.

=== Editorials ===
- Deligiorgi, Katerina (2014). Hegel: New Directions (0 ed.). Routledge. doi:10.4324/9781315712048. ISBN 978-1-317-49376-1.
