= Alison Stone (philosopher) =

British philosopher (born 1972)

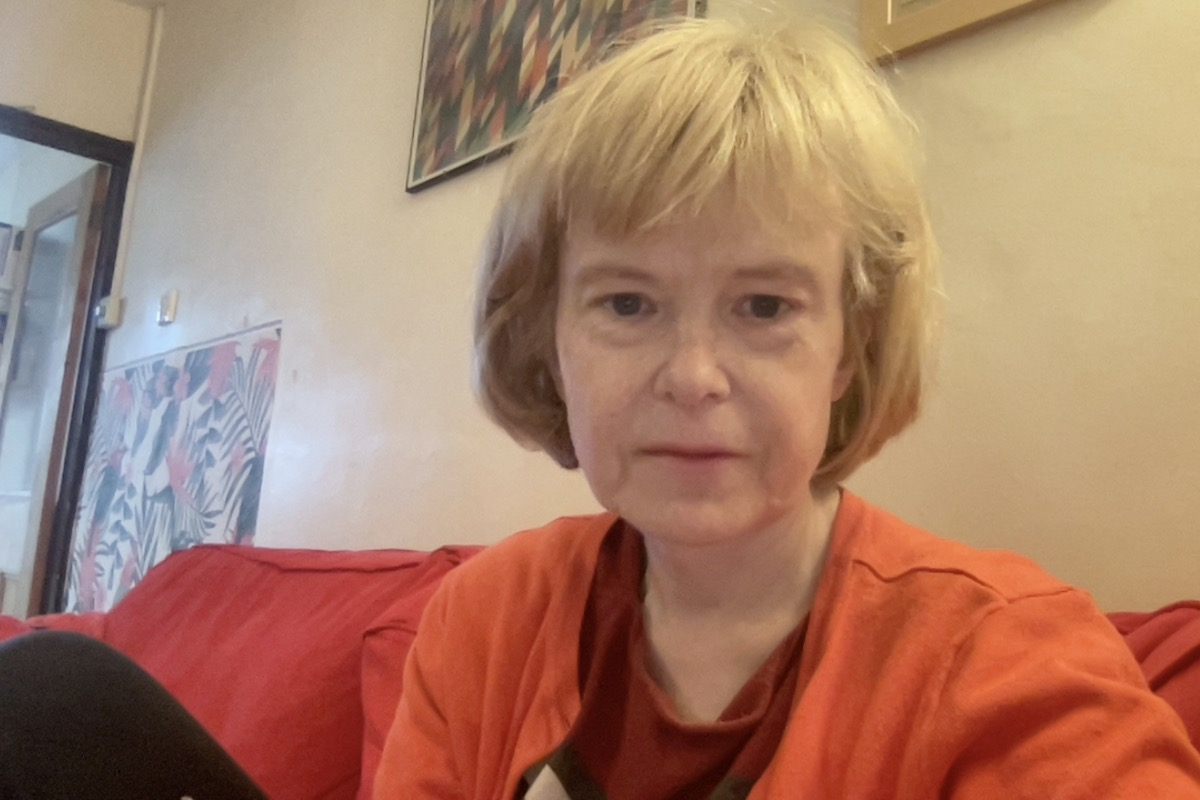
- Born: 1972 (age 53–54)

Alison Stone (born 1972) is a British philosopher. She is a Professor of Philosophy in the Department of Politics, Philosophy and Religion at Lancaster University, UK.

== Career ==
Stone has a D.Phil. degree from the University of Sussex on Hegel and feminist philosophy with the dissertation "Sexual Difference and the Philosophy of Nature: Hegel, Irigaray and the Material" in 1998. Before joining Lancaster University in 2002 she held a temporary lectureship and a research fellowship at Cambridge University.

Stone writes about women philosophers, feminist philosophy, continental European philosophy and the history of philosophy especially in the nineteenth century. Most recently she has been working on women in nineteenth-century philosophy, especially in Britain, including the philosopher Frances Power Cobbe as well as others such as Harriet Martineau and Anna Jameson. Her book Women Philosophers in Nineteenth-Century Britain received an Honorable Mention in the Journal of the History of Philosophy Book Prize 2024. She is the author of ten books and numerous articles on feminism, German Idealism, Theodor Adorno, Luce Irigaray, Judith Butler, philosophy of nature, women in philosophy, and various other topics. One of her most frequently viewed articles on Academia.edu is on 'Essentialism and Anti-Essentialism in Feminist Philosophy'. She has also written a book on philosophy and popular music. Stone previously co-edited the journal the Hegel Bulletin and was an interim co-editor of Hypatia. She has had a Philip Leverhulme Prize and a Leverhulme Major Research Fellowship.

== Selected publications ==
- Stone, Alison (2005). Petrified Intelligence: Nature in Hegel's Philosophy. State University of New York Press. ISBN 978-0-7914-6293-5.
- Luce Irigaray and the Philosophy of Sexual Difference (2006, Cambridge UP, ISBN 978-0521862707)
- An Introduction to Feminist Philosophy (2007, Polity Press, ISBN 9780745638836)
- The Edinburgh Critical History of Nineteenth-Century Philosophy (2011, Edinburgh UP, ISBN 9780748635665)
- Feminism, Psychoanalysis, and Maternal Subjectivity (2012, Routledge, ISBN 9780415885423)
- The Value of Popular Music: An Approach from Post-Kantian Aesthetics (2016, Palgrave Macmillan).
- The Routledge Companion to Feminist Philosophy, co-edited with Ann Garry and Serene Khader (2017, Taylor and Francis, ISBN 9781138795921)
- Nature, Ethics and Gender in German Romanticism and Idealism (2018, Rowman & Littlefield International, ISBN 978-1-78660-918-2)
- Being Born: Birth and Philosophy (2019, Oxford UP, ISBN 9780198845782)
- Frances Power Cobbe: Essential Writings of a Nineteenth-Century Feminist Philosopher (2021, Oxford New Histories of Philosophy series, Oxford UP, ISBN 9780197628232)
- Frances Power Cobbe (2022, Cambridge Elements in Women in the History of Philosophy, Cambridge UP, ISBN 9781009160964)
- Women Philosophers in Nineteenth-Century Britain (2023, Oxford University Press, ISBN 9780192874719)
- Women on Philosophy of Art: Britain 1770-1900 (2024, Oxford University Press, ISBN 978-0198917977
