= Kant Yearbook =

Peer-reviewed academic journal

- Discipline: Philosophy
- Language: English, German
- Edited by: Dietmar H. Heidemann

Publication details
- History: 2009–present
- Publisher: De Gruyter
- Frequency: Annually

Standard abbreviations
- ISO 4: Kant Yearb.

Indexing
- ISSN: 1868-4599 (print); 1868-4602 (web)
- LCCN: 2016204011
- OCLC no.: 1015286534

Links
- Journal homepage

Kant Yearbook is an annual peer-reviewed academic journal covering the thought of Immanuel Kant published by De Gruyter. It was established in 2009 and publishes contributions in English and German. The editor-in-chief is Dietmar H. Heidemann (University of Luxembourg).

== Abstracting and indexing ==
The journal is abstracted and indexed in:

- EBSCO databases
- Emerging Sources Citation Index
- International Bibliography of Periodical Literature in the Humanities and Social Sciences
- International Philosophical Bibliography
- Philosopher's Index
- PhilPapers
- ProQuest databases
- Scopus

== See also ==
- Kant-Studien
- Hegel Yearbook
