= Ferdinand A. Hermens =

German-American political scientist and economist

Ferdinand Aloys Hermens
- Born: 20 December 1906; Nieheim, Germany
- Died: 2 February 1998 (aged 91)
- Scientific career
- Doctoral advisor: Joseph Schumpeter

Ferdinand A. Hermens (20 December 1906 – 2 February 1998) was a German-American political scientist and economist. He was born in Nieheim, Kreis Höxter (district) in Germany and he died in Rockville, MD (U.S.). His major books "Democracy or Anarchy?" (1941) and "The Representative Republic" (1958) were translated into German, Italian and Hebrew. His most important contribution to the progress of political science was his analysis of the impact that electoral systems have in structuring party competition. Hermens advised U.S. Congressional committees on Presidential Election Procedure, the Judiciary and Divided Powers and Economic Policy, the U.S. government on re-organization of democracy in Germany and the government of Trinidad and Tobago on constitutional matters.

== Life and career ==
Hermens studied at the Universities of Münster, Freiburg, Berlin and Bonn, In 1928 he graduated from the University of Bonn with an M.A. in Economics (Diplom-Volkswirt). Here Joseph Schumpeter was the supervisor of his Ph.D. (Dr. rer. pol.) dissertation on "What is Capitalism?" ( published in 1931). After completing his Ph.D. in 1930 Hermens continued his studies of economic theory at the Universities of Paris and Kiel.

In 1934 Hermens, an active member of a Catholic students' fraternity, left Nazi Germany to spend a year as a research fellow at the London School of Economics and Political Science. In 1935 he emigrated to the U.S., where he served as an assistant professor of economics with the Catholic University of America in Washington, DC. In 1938 he moved to South Bend, IN where he became an associate professor of Economics with the University of Notre Dame. In 1945 he was made Professor of Political Science with the University of Notre Dame.

Between 1959 and 1971 Hermens returned to post-war Germany to become Professor of Political Science at the University of Cologne. In this position he succeeded Heinrich Brüning, who had been Reichskanzler from 1930 to 1932. During his tenure at Cologne Hermens was supervisor for a couple of post-docs and Ph.D. candidates who later became professors of political science in German universities. Among them are: Rudolf Wildenmann (University of Mannheim), Gerda Zellentin (University of Wuppertal), Werner Kaltefleiter (University of Kiel), Hans Kammler (University of Hohenheim), Johannes Agnoli (Free University of Berlin), Paul Kevenhörster (University of Münster). Hermens was one of the seven members of a committee of experts that recommended the introduction of a plurality voting system (first-past-the-past) for elections of the German Bundestag to the Ministry of the Interior in 1968. He retired at the end of 1971 and returned to the U.S. where he lived in the Washington, DC area.

== Works ==
The scholarly work of Ferdinand A. Hermens includes a wealth of books and numerous articles. Most of them are based on his "thoroughly sound thesis that until we understand fully the great influence which structural relationships can have on governmental policy we shall be unprepared to put representative government in the position of strength it must have to meet the challenges which now confront it." The Library of Congress (see External links) holds about 25 titles by this scholar or related to him, the German National Library (Deutsche Nationalbibliothek) lists 31 items. Not all of them are meintioned here:

- Was ist Kapitalismus? Altenburg: Pierer, 1931 (Bonn, Univ., Diss., 1931)
- Demokratie und Kapitalismus. Ein Versuch zur Soziologie der Staatsformen. München: Duncker&Humblot, 1931.
- Demokratie und Wahlrecht. Eine wahlrechtssoziologische Untersuchung zur Krise der parlamentarischen Regierungsbildung. Paderborn: Schöningh, 1933.
- Unternehmer und Konjunktur. Berlin; Weidmann, 1935.
- Der Staat und die Weltwirtschaftskrise. Berlin: Payer&Co., 1936.
- Democracy or Anarchy? A Study of proportional representation. Notre Dame, IN: University of Notre Dame Press. 1941 – via HathiTrust.(reprinted with a supplement by the author - New York: Johnson Reprint Corp., 1972).
- The Tyrants' War & the Peoples' Peace. Chicago, IL: University of Chicago Press. 1944 – via Internet Archive.
- The Representative Republic. Notre Dame, IN: University of Notre Dame Press. 1958 – via Internet Archive.
- The Fifth Republic. Notre Dame, IN: University of Notre Dame Press, 1960.
- Der Ost-West-Konflikt. Gründe und Scheingründe. Frankfurt: Athenäum Verlag, 1961.
- Wirtschaftliche und staatliche Stabilität. Frankfurt: Athenäum Verlag, 1964.
- Demokratie oder Anarchie? Frankfurt: A. Metzner, 1951 (2nd ed., Opladen: Westdeutscher Verlag, 1968),
- Verfassungslehre. Frankfurt: Athenäum Verlag, 1964 (2nd ed., Opladen: Westdeutscher Verlag, 1968).
- Zwischen Politik und Vernunft. Gesammelte Aufsätze aus drei Welten. Berlin: Duncker&Humblot, 1969.

== Publications in his honor or memory ==
- Kaltefleiter-Gemmecke, Vera (ed.), Im Kampf für Frieden und Freiheit - Ferdinand A. Hermens 65 Jahre. Die Festansprachen, eine Bibliographie von F. A. Hermens und die Veröffentlichungen des Forschungsinstituts für Politische Wissenschaft und Europäische Fragen der Universität zu Köln. Cologne: Heymanns Verlag, 1972.
- Wildenmann, Rudolf (ed.), Form und Erfahrung - Ein Leben für die Demokratie. Zum 70. Geburtstag von Ferdinand A. Hermens. Berlin: Duncker&Humblot, 1976.
- Thümmler, Elllen: 'Ferdinand A. Hermens und die Formel der Demokratie', in: Schale, Frank et al. (eds.): Intellektuelle Emigration. Zur Aktualität eines historischen Phänomens. Wiesbaden: VS Verlag für Sozialwissenschaften, 2012, pp. 155–184.
- Detjen, Joachim: Ferdinand A. Hermens (1906-1998), in: Jesse, Eckhard/ Liebold, Sebastian (eds.): Deutsche Politikwissenschaftler - Werk und Wirkung. Von Abendroth bis Zellentin, Baden-Baden: Nomos, 2014, S. 347–360.
