= Richard Wienold =

German snooker player

Richard Wienold (born 23 August 1998) is a German snooker player and three-time German Champion (2017, 2022, 2023).

== Career ==
Wienold began competing nationally in 2013, achieving his first major title in 2017 by winning both the U21 and senior German Championships.

He also excelled in Six-Red Snooker, winning the German Six-Reds Championship in 2022 and 2024.

== Achievements ==
- 3× German Champion (2017, 2022, 2023)
- 2× German Six-Reds Champion (2022, 2024)
- Last 16 – European Championship (2020)
