= Simon Lumsden =

Philosopher

- Born: Australia

Philosophical work
- Era: Contemporary philosophy
- Region: Western philosophy
- School: Continental
- Main interests: Poststructuralism; German idealism

Simon Lumsden is Associate Professor of philosophy at University of New South Wales. He is known for his research on subjectivism, German idealism and poststructuralism.

== See also ==
- Subject (philosophy)

== Bibliography ==
- Lumsden S, 2014, Self-Consciousness and the Critique of the Subject: Hegel, Heidegger, and the Poststructuralists, Columbia University Press, New York
- Lumsden S, 2013, 'Deleuze and Hegel on the limits of Self-Determined Subjectivity', in Houle K; Vernon J (ed.), Hegel and Deleuze: Together Again for the First Time, NorthWestern University Press, Evanston, Ill., pp. 133 - 151
- Lumsden S, 2013, 'Between Nature and Spirit: Hegel?s Account of Habit', in Stern DS (ed.), Essays on Hegel's Philosophy of Subjective Spirit, edn. Hardback, State University of New York Press, Albany, pp. 121 - 138
