= Rocío Zambrana =

Academic background
- Education: New School for Social Research (M.A., PhD)
- Thesis: The Logic of Critique: Hegel, Honneth, and Dialectical Reversibility (2010)
- Doctoral advisor: Jay Bernstein
- Other advisors: Richard J. Bernstein, Angelica Nuzzo, Simon Critchley

Academic work
- Era: Contemporary philosophy
- Region: Western philosophy

Rocío Zambrana is a philosopher at the University of Puerto Rico, Rio Piedras.

== Life and works ==
=== Selected publications ===
- Zambrana, Rocío (2021). Colonial Debts: The Case of Puerto Rico. Duke University Press. doi:10.1215/9781478013198. ISBN 978-1-4780-9171-4.
- Zambrana, Rocío (2015). Hegel's Theory of Intelligibility. University of Chicago Press. doi:10.7208/chicago/9780226280257.001.0001. ISBN 978-0-226-28011-0.
