= Schwerte =

- Town
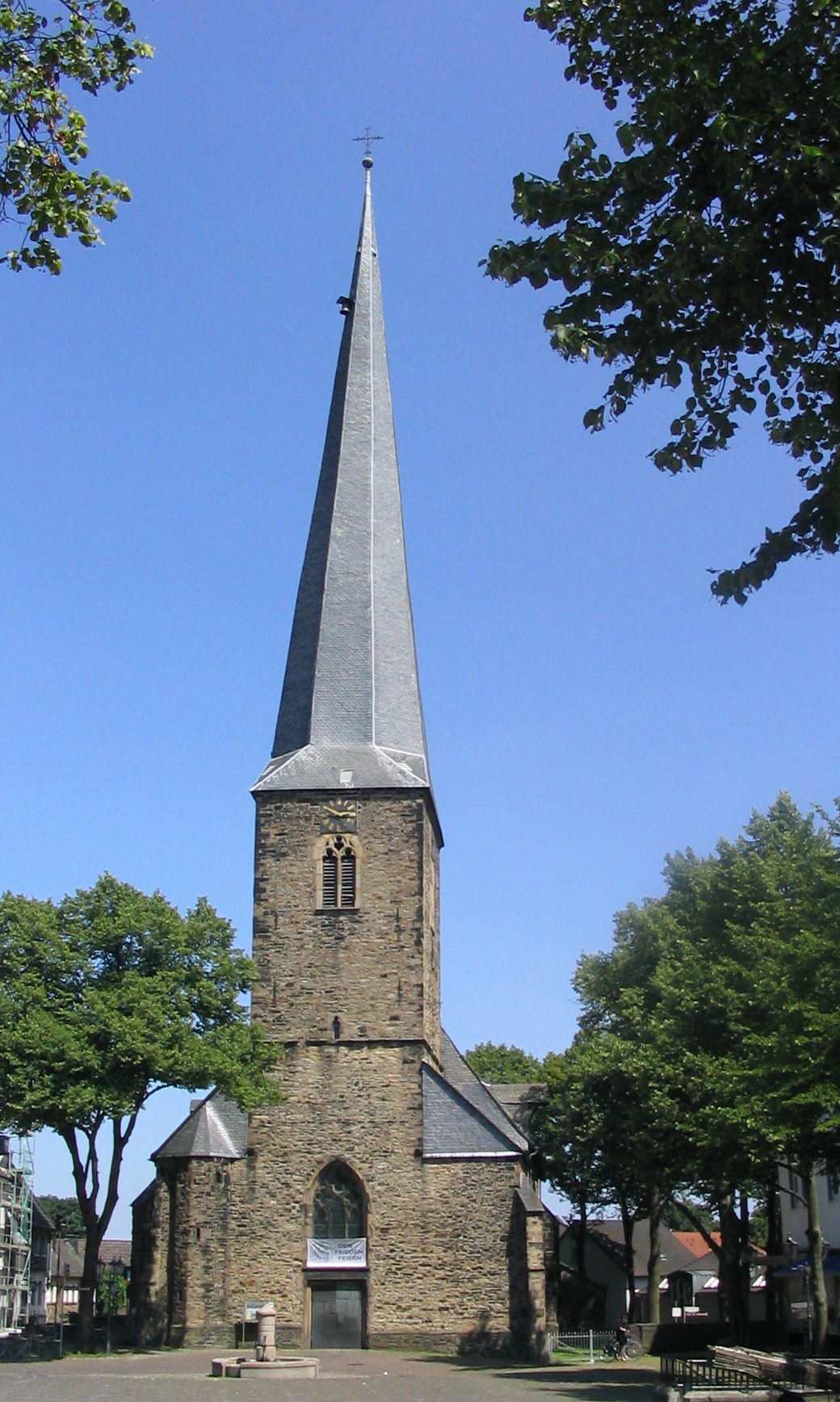
- Church of St. Victor

- Coat of arms

- Location of Schwerte within Unna district
- Interactive map of Schwerte
- Location within Germany Location within North Rhine-Westphalia
- Coordinates: 51°26′45″N 7°33′55″E
- Country: Germany
- State: North Rhine-Westphalia
- Admin. region: Arnsberg
- District: Unna

Government
  - Mayor (2018–23): Dimitrios Axourgos (SPD)

Area
  - Total: 56.23 km^{2} (21.71 sq mi)
- Elevation: 120 m (390 ft)

Population (2025-12-31)
  - Total: 45,794
  - Density: 814.4/km^{2} (2,109/sq mi)
- Time zone: UTC+01:00 (CET)
  - Summer (DST): UTC+02:00 (CEST)
- Postal codes: 58239
- Dialling codes: 02304
- Vehicle registration: UN
- Website: www.schwerte.de

Schwerte (German pronunciation: [ʃveːɐ̯tə]; Westphalian: Schweierte) is a town in the district of Unna, in North Rhine-Westphalia, Germany.

== Geography ==
Schwerte is situated in the Ruhr valley, at the south-east border of the Ruhr Area. South of Schwerte begins the mountainous Sauerland region.

=== Division of the town ===
After the local government reforms of 1975 Schwerte consists of the following districts:

- Schwerte
- Holzen
- Westhofen
- Ergste
- Geisecke
- Villigst
- Wandhofen

== History ==
Schwerte received civic rights in the 12th century.

The railway facility in the eastern district of Schwerte became a branch of the Buchenwald concentration camp in April 1944. The camp had 445 prisoners in August and 670 in November 1944. The number of escapees was comparatively high; in November 1944 48 prisoners escaped. The camp in Schwerte was disbanded in December 1944 and the remaining prisoners were brought back to Buchenwald.

== Population ==
Historical population

Year	Pop.	±% p.a.
1965	39,610	—
1970	41,578	+0.97%
1975	45,725	+1.92%
1980	47,809	+0.90%
1985	48,126	+0.13%
1990	50,696	+1.05%
1995	50,734	+0.01%

Year	Pop.	±% p.a.
2000	50,834	+0.04%
2005	49,730	−0.44%
2010	48,259	−0.60%
2015	46,723	−0.64%
2020	46,124	−0.26%
2025	45,794	−0.14%

Source: Landesdatabank Nordrhein-Westfalen

== Main sights ==
- The Romanesque church of St. Victor has a carved altar of 1523, and stained glass of the 14th and 15th centuries.
- The Wuckenhof is a timber-framed house built in the 16th century.
- The Ruhrtalmuseum is situated in a former town hall, that was built in 1547.
- The Rohrmeisterei was built in 1889 by a water purification company. It was a pumping station until 1924. Today it is part of the German route of industrial heritage (Route der Industriekultur).

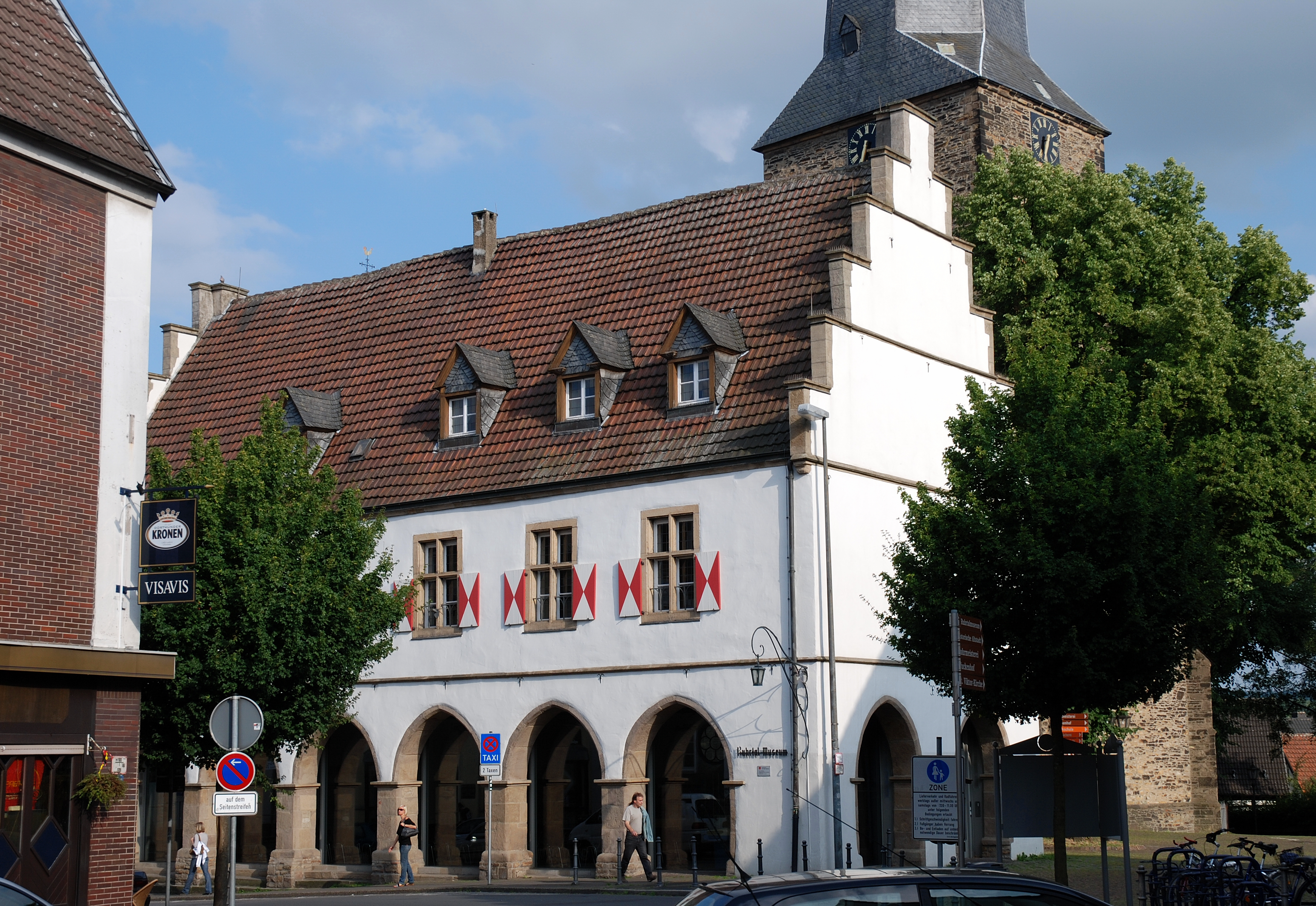
Ruhr Valley Museum

== Economy ==
Today, there are some industries left, which are confined to the manufacture of iron and steel goods.

== Twin towns – sister cities ==
Schwerte is twinned with:

- Béthune, France (1960)
- Bruay-la-Buissière, France (1965)
- Violaines, France (1969)
- Allouagne, France (1975)
- Hastings, England, UK (1982)
- Cava de' Tirreni, Italy (1984)
- Leppävirta, Finland (1992)
- Pyatigorsk, Russia (1992)
- Ioannina, Greece (2022)

== Notable people ==
- Johannes Goddaeus (1555–1632), jurist
- Heinrich Rehkemper (1894–1949), baritone singer
- Erwin Rösener (1902–1946), SS-Obergruppenführer Nazi officer executed for war crimes
- Werner van der Zyl (1902–1984), rabbi
- Detlef Lewe (1939–2008), sprint canoer, lived in Schwerte
- Paul Kevenhörster (born 1941), political scientist
- Wolfgang Kleff (born 1946), footballer
- Rosemarie Trockel (born 1952), artist
- Carmen Rischer (born 1956), rhythmic gymnast
- Thomas Kroth (born 1959), footballer, lives in Schwerte
- Violetta Oblinger-Peters (born 1977), Austrian slalom canoeist
- Jens Ewald (born 1983), slalom canoeist
- Lasse Sobiech (born 1991), footballer
