= Duncan Forbes (historian) =

Scottish historian (1922–1994)

Duncan Forbes MC (19 May 1922 – 3 December 1994) was a Scottish historian. He was a Reader (later Emeritus) in the History of Political Thought at the University of Cambridge.

== Life ==
Forbes was born in 1922, the only son of Duncan Alexander Forbes and Sybil Mitchell, and nephew of the Cambridge academic Mansfield Forbes. He was educated at Haileybury College and Clare College, Cambridge, where his late uncle was a fellow and had published a history of the college's first 600 years. Duncan Forbes's time at Clare was initially short-lived, as in 1942 he was called up to fight in the Second World War; enlisting in the Seaforth Highlanders, he won the Military Cross while serving as a platoon commander at the Battle of Anzio. Returning to Clare in 1945, he was awarded a degree in history and was made a fellow of the college in 1947, remaining there for the rest of his life.

== Academic career ==
Forbes edited Adam Ferguson's An Essay on the History of Civil Society for the University of Edinburgh Press in 1966. In 1970 Pelican Books published the volumes of David Hume's History of Great Britain that covered the early Stuarts, to which Forbes wrote the introduction.

In his book Hume's Philosophical Politics, Forbes argued that Hume's main purpose in writing The History of England was to give "the Hanoverian regime a proper intellectual foundation". Against the traditional portrayal of Hume as a Tory, Forbes labelled Hume's beliefs "skeptical Whiggism", that is, an acceptance of the Revolution Settlement coupled with a rejection of most other Whig orthodoxies such as the concept of the "ancient constitution".

Forbes' work on the Scottish Enlightenment led to one of his students, John Dunn, calling him "a Highlander in exile".

== Works ==
- 'Scientific Whiggism: Adam Smith and John Millar', Cambridge Journal, VII (1954), pp. 643–70.
- Hume's Philosophical Politics. Cambridge, London, New York, Melbourne: Cambridge University Press. 1975 – via Internet Archive..
- 'Sceptical Whiggism, Commerce and Liberty', in A. S. Skinner and T. Wilson (eds.), Essays on Adam Smith (Oxford University Press, 1976).
