= Villigst =

Coordinates: 51.4342°N 7.5950°E

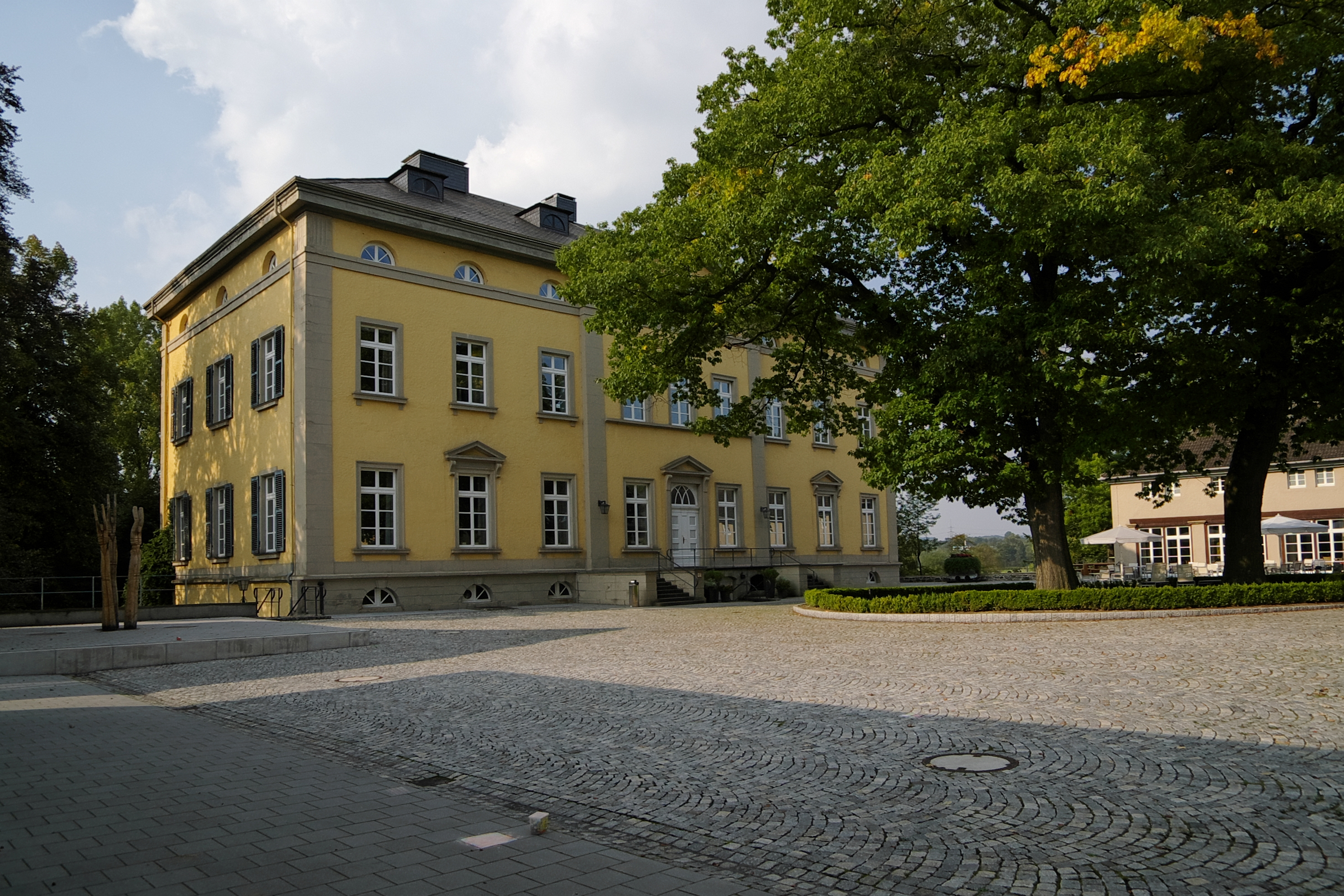
Haus Villigst

Villigst is a Stadtteil (district) of the city Schwerte in North Rhine-Westphalia, Germany. On 31 December 2012, Villigst had a population of 3.309 inhabitants. It lies south of the river Ruhr near Sauerland. It borders on Ergste, another district of Schwerte.

On 1 January 1975, Villigst was incorporated into the city of Schwerte, before it belonged to Iserlohn.

Villigst is home to the Evangelisches Studienwerk Villigst, one of Germany's thirteen major scholarship foundations for exceptionally talented and high-achieving students from all academic disciplines.
