= Marina Bykova =

Russian philosopher (1960-)

Marina Fedorovna Bykova
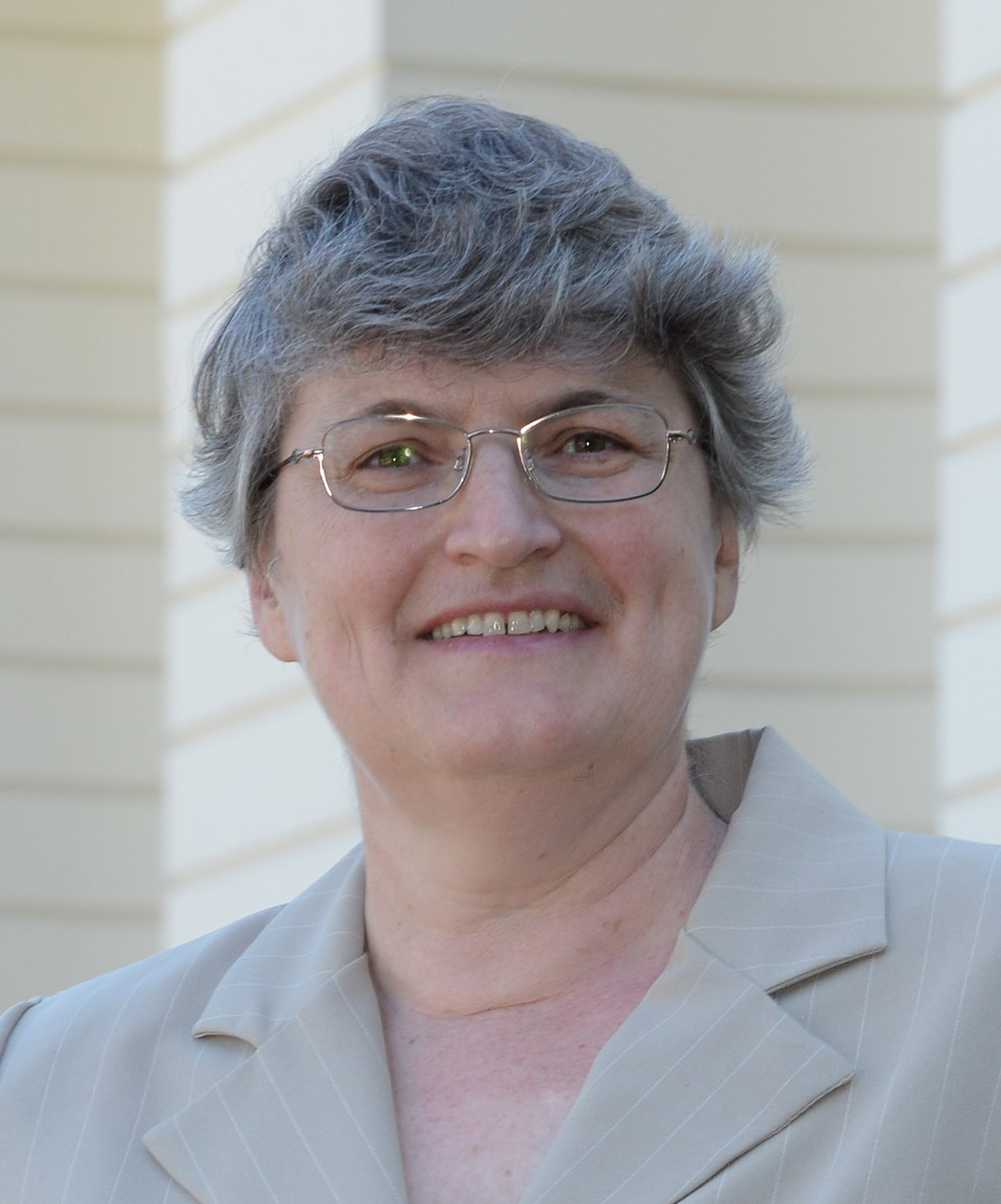
- Marina Bykova in 2018
- Born: Marina Fedorovna Bykova; Rostov-on-Don, Russia
- Education: Rostov-on-Don University; Russian Academy of Sciences
- Known for: History of Philosophy; Philosophy in Russia
- Awards: Humboldt Research Fellowship
- Scientific career
- Fields: Philosophy
- Workplaces: North Carolina State University
- Doctoral advisor: Nelly V. Motroshilova
- Website: chass.ncsu.edu/people/mfbykova/

Marina Fedorovna Bykova (born October 22, 1960) is a Russian philosopher at North Carolina State University. She's the editor-in-chief of the journal Studies in East European Thought.

== Education ==
Bykova received her Ph.D. (1985) and habilitation (Dr. Habil., 1993) in Philosophy from the Institute of Philosophy, Russian Academy of Sciences in Moscow.

== Selected publications ==
=== Articles ===
- Bykova, Marina F. (2016). "What is wrong with the divine interpretation of Geist in Hegel?". Studies in East European Thought. 68 (2/3): 181–192. doi:10.1007/s11212-016-9255-8. ISSN 0925-9392. JSTOR 45106824.

=== Edited volumes ===
- Bykova, Marina F., ed. (2026). Philosophy Through Its History: The Intellectual Legacy of Nelly V. Motroshilova. Leiden, The Netherlands: Brill. doi:10.1163/9789004760677. ISBN 978-90-04-75975-6.
- Bykova, Marina F., ed. (2025). At the Vanishing Point in History: Critical Perspectives on the Russia-Ukraine War. London/New York: Bloomsbury Academic. doi:10.1080/21599165.2025.2522087. ISBN 9781350438316.
- Bykova, Marina F., ed. (2024). Hegel's Philosophy of Nature: A Critical Guide. Cambridge: Cambridge University Press. doi:10.1017/9781009023160. ISBN 978-1316519271.
- Bykova, Marina F.; Forster, Michael N.; Steiner, Lina, eds. (2021). The Palgrave Handbook of Russian Thought. doi:10.1007/978-3-030-62982-3. ISBN 978-3-030-62981-6.
- Bykova, Marina F.; Westphal, Kenneth R. Handbook, eds. (2020). The Palgrave Hegel Handbook. Palgrave Handbooks in German Idealism. doi:10.1007/978-3-030-26597-7. ISBN 978-3-030-26596-0. ISSN 2634-6230.
- Bykova, Marina F., ed. (2020). The Bloomsbury Handbook of Fichte. London/New York: Bloomsbury Academic. doi:10.5040/9781350036642. ISBN 978-1-3503-7567-3.
- Bykova, Marina F., ed. (2019). The German Idealism Reader: Ideas, Responses and Legacy. London/New York: Bloomsbury Academic. ISBN 978-1474286671.
- Bykova, Marina F., ed. (2019). Hegel's Philosophy of Spirit: A Critical Guide. Cambridge Critical Guides. Cambridge: Cambridge University Press. doi:10.1017/9781108164184. ISBN 978-1-107-19554-7.
- Bykova, Marina F.; Lektorsky, Vladislav A., eds. (2019). Philosophical Thought in Russia in the Second Half of the Twentieth Century: A Contemporary View from Russia and Abroad. Bloomsbury Academic. ISBN 978-1-350-04058-8.
