= Christoph Schuringa =

British philosopher

Education
- Education: King's College, Cambridge (BA); Courtauld Institute of Art (MA); Birkbeck, University of London (PhD)

Philosophical work
- Era: Contemporary philosophy
- Region: Western philosophy
- Institutions: Northeastern University London
- Main interests: German philosophy
- Website: christophschuringa.com

Christoph Schuringa (/ʃəˈrɪŋɡə/) is a British philosopher and associate professor in philosophy at Northeastern University London. He is known for his works on German philosophy and has served as editor of Hegel Bulletin.

Schuringa's 2025 book, A Social History of Analytic Philosophy, narrates the suppression of radical politics within American academic philosophy during and after the era of McCarthyism. Kieran Setiya was critical of the book's thesis that analytic philosophy is inherently conservative.

== Selected publications ==
- (ed. with Brian Ball), The Act and Object of Judgment: Historical and Philosophical Perspectives (London/New York: Routledge, 2019)
- Schuringa, Christoph (2025). Karl Marx and the Actualization of Philosophy. Cambridge: Cambridge University Press. doi:10.1017/9781009304849. ISBN 978-1-009-30480-1.
- A Social History of Analytic Philosophy: How Politics Has Shaped an Apolitical Philosophy (Verso, 2025)
