= Wilhelm Raimund Beyer =

German Jurist

Wilhelm Raimund Beyer (May 2, 1902 in Nuremberg – October 6, 1990) was a German jurist, philosopher of law, Hegel scholar and the founder of Internationalen Hegel-Gesellschaft.

== Life ==
Beyer was born in Nuremberg on May 2, 1902, the son of a lawyer. His attendance at the humanistic Melanchthon Grammar School in Nuremberg, which Hegel had headed as principal from 1808 to 1816, gave him an early connection to Hegel. He studied in Erlangen and Rostock and was awarded his doctorate in Erlangen in 1924 with a thesis on the developmental idea in the law of bills of exchange and cheques. This was followed in 1928 by the assessor examination in Munich.

After the end of the war, he was in contact with Joseph E. Drexel and became chief legal adviser for the publishing group "Nürnberger Presse", which he had founded. He published a series of essays on the philosophy of law, was strongly critical of National Socialism, felt a connection to Marxism–Leninism and demanded respect for human rights, especially in the West, during these Cold War years. In 1953, he founded the International Hegel Society. Beyer was its chairman until 1982 and led it to great international resonance over several decades. From 1982 until his death in 1990, he was Honorary Chairman of the Society.

In 1974, he refused to allow Jürgen Habermas to attend the Hegel Congress at Lomonosov University in Moscow.

He last lived in Nuremberg, Berlin (East) and Salzburg. His estate is kept in the German Federal Archives in Koblenz. In July 2002, when Wilhelm Raimund Beyer would have been one hundred years old, the Centro di Studi Filosofici S. Abbondio held an international symposium on the philosophy of law to honor his memory.

== Writings ==
- Rechtsphilosophische Besinnung. Eine Warnung vor der ewigen Wiederkehr des Naturrechts. Verlag C. F. Müller, Karlsruhe 1947.
- Hegel-Bilder. Kritik der Hegel-Deutungen, 2. Aufl. 1967.
- Die Sünden der Frankfurter Schule. Ein Beitrag zur Kritik der Kritischen Theorie. Berlin: Akademie Verlag, 1971, 165 S.
- Zwischen Phänomenologie und Logik, Pahl-Rugenstein 1974.
- Systemtheorie im Griff des Marxismus, Hain 1976.
- Denken und Bedenken. Hegel-Aufsätze (hg. von Manfred Buhr), Berlin: Akademie-Verlag, 1977.
- Der alte Politikus Hegel, 1982.
- Hegel. Der Triumph des neuen Rechts, Vsa Verlag 1983.
- Gegenwartsbezüge Hegelscher Themen. Mit unbekannten Hegel-Texten zur Farbenlehre, Bodenheim: Athenaeum Verlag 1985.
- Materialismus, Wissenschaft und Weltanschauung im Fortschritt, hrsg. gem. mit: Helmut Arnaszus, Kurt Bayertz, Hans Jörg Sandkühler, Pahl-Rugenstein 1985.
- Rückkehr unerwünscht. Joseph Drexels „Reise nach Mauthausen“ und der Widerstandskreis Ernst Niekisch. Hrsg.: Wilhelm Raimund Beyer. Stuttgart: Deutsche Verlags-Anstalt, 1978, 331 S., ISBN 3-421-01846-4 (Ein literarisches Dokument des Unmenschlichen)
- Stalingrad. Unten, wo das Leben konkret war, Bodenheim: Athenaeum Verlag 1987.
- Freibeuter in hegelschen Gefilden, Frankfurt: Vervuert 1988.
- Manfred Buhr / Joseph E. Drexel / Werner Jakusch (Hrsg.): Wilhelm Raimund Beyer. Eine Bibliographie. Mit einem Anhang: W. R. Beyer „Aus der Geschichte der Internationalen Hegel-Gesellschaft“. 2. Auflage. Wien-München-Zürich, Europaverlag 1967, 1972, 78 S.; 3., ergänzte u. erneut erweiterte Auflage, 1982, 136 S., ISBN 3-203-50793-5.
