= Julia Peters =

Julia Peters (born 1978) is a German philosopher and professor of classical German philosophy at Heidelberg University. Her research focuses on Kant and post-Kantian philosophy, particularly German idealism, as well as moral philosophy, philosophical anthropology, philosophy of mind, and aesthetics. Her work has dealt especially with Hegel, Kant, moral character, human nature, affect, and theories of freedom.

== Life and work ==
Peters studied philosophy, logic, and philosophy of science at LMU Munich, where she received an M.Phil. She was a visiting student at St John's College, Oxford, from 2001 to 2002, and subsequently pursued doctoral studies at Johns Hopkins University and University College London (UCL). She received her PhD in philosophy from UCL in 2009 with a dissertation entitled Art and Philosophy in Hegel's System.

After completing her doctorate, Peters was a postdoctoral fellow at the European College of Liberal Arts in Berlin and subsequently a research fellow at the Center for Advanced Studies at LMU Munich. In 2012, she worked at the University of Bonn. From 2013 to 2022, she held academic positions at the University of Tübingen, interrupted from 2017 to 2018 by a Feodor Lynen Fellowship of the Alexander von Humboldt Foundation at Columbia University. She completed her habilitation in philosophy at the University of Tübingen in 2020.

In April 2022, Peters became professor of the history of modern philosophy at LMU Munich. Since October 2022, she has been professor of classical German philosophy at Heidelberg University.

Peters's research addresses systematic questions in Kantian and post-Kantian philosophy. Her main areas of research include moral philosophy and moral psychology, philosophical anthropology, philosophy of mind, and aesthetics. She has worked in particular on Kant's conception of moral character, Hegel's philosophy of mind and aesthetics, and the relation between human nature and rational agency. More recent work examines the role of affect and bodily experience in rational subjectivity and post-Kantian conceptions of freedom.

Her first monograph, Hegel on Beauty (2015), develops an interpretation of Hegel's aesthetics that emphasizes the relation between beauty, embodiment, and ethical life. The book has been discussed in a number of reviews and studies of Hegel's aesthetics. Her second monograph, A Kantian Theory of Moral Character (2026), develops an account of moral character drawing on Kant's practical philosophy.

=== Publications ===
==== Books ====
- Peters, Julia (2026). A Kantian Theory of Moral Character. Cambridge: Cambridge University Press. ISBN 978-1-009-62031-4. doi:10.1017/9781009620369.
- Peters, Julia (2015). Hegel on Beauty. New York and London: Routledge. ISBN 978-1-138-09870-1. doi:10.4324/9781315758121.

==== Edited volumes ====
- Peters, Julia; Oehl, Thomas, eds. (2026). Hegel über das Ich. Special issue of the Deutsche Zeitschrift für Philosophie. Berlin: De Gruyter.
- Peters, Julia, ed. (2012). Aristotelian Ethics in Contemporary Perspective. New York and London: Routledge.

==== Selected articles ====
- Peters, Julia (2024). "Transformativism and Expressivity in Hegel's Philosophy of Mind". Archiv für Geschichte der Philosophie. 106 (2): 295–312.
- Peters, Julia (2023). "Hegel und der anthropologische Kontinuitätsskeptizismus". Deutsche Zeitschrift für Philosophie. 71 (4): 554–564.
- Peters, Julia (2019). "Moral Character, Commitment, and Persistence". Philosophical Inquiries. 7 (2): 151–164.
- Peters, Julia (2018). "Hegels Begriff der Gewohnheit". Deutsche Zeitschrift für Philosophie. 66 (3): 325–338.
- Peters, Julia (2018). "Kant's Gesinnung". Journal of the History of Philosophy. 56 (3): 497–518.
- Peters, Julia (2015). "On Naturalism in Hegel's Philosophy of Spirit". British Journal for the History of Philosophy. 24 (1): 111–131.
- Peters, Julia (2015). "On Automaticity as a Constituent of Virtue". Ethical Theory and Moral Practice. 18 (1): 165–175.
- Peters, Julia (2011). "A Theory of Tragic Experience according to Hegel". European Journal of Philosophy. 19 (1): 85–106.
- Peters, Julia (2010). "Proust's Recherche and Hegelian Teleology". Inquiry. 53 (2): 146–161.

For a complete list of publications, see Peters's academic website.
