= Hegel-Jahrbuch =

- Discipline: Philosophy
- Language: English, German
- Edited by: Brady Bowman, Myriam Gerhard and Jure Zovko

Publication details
- History: 1961–present
- Publisher: De Gruyter, Duncker and Humblot
- Frequency: Annually

Standard abbreviations
- ISO 4: Hegel-Jahrb.

Indexing
- ISSN: 0073-1579 (print); 2192-5550 (web)
- OCLC no.: 1250095511

Links
- Journal homepage; Duncker & Humblot; De Gruyter

Hegel-Jahrbuch or Hegel Yearbook or Hegel Annual is an annual peer-reviewed academic journal covering the thought of Georg Wilhelm Friedrich Hegel published by International Hegel Society, which was founded in 1953.

== History ==
The journal was published since 1961, and the editor was Wilhelm Raimund Beyer until 1984. It publishes contributions in English and German. The editors are Andreas Arndt, Brady Bowman, Myriam Gerhard and Jure Zovko. Issues from 1999 to 2018 are available online from De Gruyter Brill. All the subsequent volumes, post-2018 are available from Duncker & Humblot.

== Indexing and abstracting ==
The Hegel Yearbook (Hegel-Jahrbuch) is indexed in a range of international academic and bibliographic services, including CARHUS Plus+, CNKI Scholar (China National Knowledge Infrastructure), CNPIEC (China National Publications Import & Export Group Co.), EBSCO (relevant databases), EBSCO Discovery Service, ERIH PLUS (European Reference Index for the Humanities and Social Sciences), Google Scholar, the Norwegian Register for Scientific Journals, Scopus (Elsevier), Sherpa Romeo, and WorldCat (OCLC). Additionally, the journal is archived in PORTICO, ensuring its long-term digital preservation and accessibility.

== See also ==
- Hegel-Archiv
- Hegel Bulletin
- Hegel-Studien
- Kant Yearbook
- Kant-Studien
- List of philosophy journals
