= Klaus Düsing =

Klaus Düsing (born September 3, 1940 – July 8, 2023 in Hilchenbach) was a German philosopher and university lecturer.

== Life ==
He studied philosophy, German studies and classical philology (especially Latin studies) at the University of Cologne and the University of Zurich. After gaining his doctorate in 1967 at the University of Cologne with the dissertation Die Teleologie in Kants Weltbegriff, and then his habilitation in 1975 at the Ruhr University Bochum, with the dissertation Das Problem der Subjektivität in Hegels Konzeptionen der Logik, he was a private lecturer from 1975 to 1980, later becoming a professor in Bochum. From 1980 to 1983, he was a university professor at the University of Siegen. Since 1983, he has been a university professor at the University of Cologne. His research areas were classical German philosophy from Kant to Hegel, philosophy of antiquity, modern theories of subjectivity and practical philosophy.

== Writings (selection) ==
- Hegel und die Geschichte der Philosophie. Ontologie und Dialektik in Antike und Neuzeit. Darmstadt 1983, ISBN 3-534-07959-0.
- Selbstbewußtseinsmodelle. Moderne Kritiken und systematische Entwürfe zur konkreten Subjektivität. München 1997, ISBN 3-7705-3232-5.
- Fundamente der Ethik. Unzeitgemäße typologische und subjektivitätstheoretische Untersuchungen. Stuttgart 2005, ISBN 3-7728-2369-6.
- Subjektivität und Freiheit. Untersuchungen zum Idealismus von Kant bis Hegel. Stuttgart–Bad Cannstatt 2013, ISBN 978-3-7728-2614-6.

== Literature ==
- als Herausgeber Kristina Engelhard: Aufklärungen. Festschrift für Klaus Düsing zum 60. Geburtstag . Berlin 2002, ISBN 3-428-10772-1.
- als Herausgeber Dirk Fonfara: Metaphysik als Wissenschaft. Festschrift für Klaus Düsing zum 65. Geburtstag. München 2006, ISBN 3-495-48205-9.
