= David Lamb (philosopher) =

- Born: 1942 (age 83–84)

Academic background
- Education: University of Southampton (PhD)
- Thesis: From Foundations to System: A Study of Descriptive Dialectics in G.W.F. Hegel's Phanomenologie des Geistes (1977)
- Academic advisor: Anthony Manser

Academic work
- Era: Contemporary philosophy
- Region: Western philosophy
- School or tradition: German Idealism
- Institutions: Manchester University

David Lamb (born 1942) is a former professor of philosophy at the University of Manchester.

== Life and works ==
- Language and Perception in Hegel and Wittgenstein. Avebury. 1979. ISBN 978-0-86127-101-6.
- Hegel—From Foundation to System. Martinus Nijhoff Philosophy Library. Vol. 1. 1980. doi:10.1007/978-94-009-8866-8. ISBN 978-94-009-8868-2.
- Lamb, David, ed. (2019). Hegel and Modern Philosophy. doi:10.4324/9780367809355. ISBN 978-0-367-80935-5.
- Stepelevich, Lawrence S.; Lamb, David (1983). Hegel's philosophy of action. Humanities Press. ISBN 978-0-391-02823-4.
