= Stephen Houlgate =

British philosopher

- Born: 23 March 1954 (age 72)

Education
- Education: University of Cambridge (PhD)
- Thesis: Metaphysics and its criticism in the philosophies of Hegel and Nietzsche (1984)
- Doctoral advisor: Nicholas Boyle
- Other advisors: Raymond Plant; Barry Nisbet; J. P. Stern; Duncan Forbes

Philosophical work
- Era: 21st-century philosophy
- Region: Western philosophy
- School: Continental
- Institutions: University of Warwick
- Doctoral students: Beth Lord
- Main interests: Post-Kantian philosophy
- Website: https://warwick.ac.uk/fac/soc/philosophy/people/houlgate/

Stephen Houlgate (/ˈhuːlɡeɪt/; born 23 March 1954) is a British philosopher and Professor of Philosophy at the University of Warwick. He is known for his works on Hegel, Heidegger and Derrida's thought.

== Life and works ==
In contrast to the metaphysical and non-metaphysical readings of Hegel's Logic, Houlgate is said to have a "revised-metaphysical" reading of Hegel's philosophy.

=== Selected publications ===
- Hegel, Nietzsche and the Criticism of Metaphysics. Cambridge: Cambridge University Press. 1986. doi:10.1017/cbo9780511624780. ISBN 978-0-521-89279-7.
- An Introduction to Hegel: Freedom, Truth and History, 2nd edition, Blackwell, 2005
- The Opening of Hegel's Logic: From Being to Infinity. Purdue University Press. 2006. ISBN 978-1-55753-256-5.
- Hegel's 'Phenomenology of Spirit': A Reader's Guide. A&C Black. 10 January 2013. ISBN 978-0-8264-8511-3.
- Hegel on Being. Bloomsbury Academic. 8 August 2024. ISBN 978-1-350-45858-1.

=== Edited ===
- Hegel and the Philosophy of Nature, SUNY, 1998
- The Hegel Reader, Blackwell, 1998
- Hegel and the Arts, Northwestern University Press, 2007
- G.W.F. Hegel: Outlines of the Philosophy of Right, Oxford University Press, 2008
- Houlgate, Stephen; Baur, Michael, eds. (8 April 2011). A Companion to Hegel. Wiley. doi:10.1002/9781444397161. ISBN 978-1-4051-7076-5.

== See also ==
- Nietzsche and Philosophy
- Elements of the Philosophy of Right
- A History of Western Philosophy
- Being and Time
- Duncan Forbes (historian)
