= James Kreines =

American philosopher

Academic background
- Education: University of Chicago (PhD)
- Thesis: Hegel on Mind, Action and Social Life: The Theory of Geist as a Theory of Explanation (2001)
- Doctoral advisor: Michael Forster, Robert B. Pippin, Candace Vogler

Academic work
- Era: Contemporary philosophy
- Region: Western philosophy
- School or tradition: German idealism
- Institutions: Claremont McKenna College
- Website: https://www.kreines.net/

James Kreines is an American philosopher who is Edward S. Gould professor of philosophy, at Claremont McKenna College. His research mostly concerns classical German philosophy.

== Life and works ==
Kreines started studying philosophy in Princeton University in 1986 and received his bachelor in 1990. He received his PhD from University of Chicago in 2001 with the dissertation title "Hegel on Mind, Action and Social Life: The Theory of Geist as a Theory of Explanation", under supervision of Robert B. Pippin.

His 2016 book Reason in the World has received numerous reviews from Franz Knappik, Robert Stern (followed by a response from Kreines), Paul Redding, Armando Manchisi, Christopher Yeomans, Sebastian Rand, François Touchard, Anton Kabeshkin, Carlos Ortiz de Landázuri, Karen Ng and Paul Giladi. The work also featured on a book symposium held by Humboldt University later published by the Hegel Bulletin, and an author-meets-critics session later published in Hegel-Studien, containing reviews from Brady Bowman, Terry Pinkard and Clinton Tolley, accompanied by an introduction and response from Kreines.

In 2026 he published Hegel and Spinoza (CUP: Elements). There was a workshop on the book at the LMU Munich, and planned events at Basel, Padua, and the Eastern Division of the APA.

He is on the Wissenschaftlicher Beirat of Hegel-Studien and on the editorial board of the Hegel Bulletin.

== Selected publications ==
=== Monographs ===
- Kreines, James (2026). Hegel and Spinoza. Elements in the Philosophy of Georg Wilhelm Friedrich Hegel. Cambridge University Press. doi:10.1017/9781009593205. ISBN 978-1-009-59320-5.
- Kreines, James (2015). Reason in the World: Hegel's Metaphysics and its Philosophical Appeal. Oxford University Press. doi:10.1093/acprof:oso/9780190204303.001.0001. ISBN 978-0-19-020430-3.

=== Edited volumes ===
- Zuckert, Rachel; Kreines, James, eds. (2017). Hegel on Philosophy in History. Cambridge University Press. doi:10.1017/9781316145012. ISBN 978-1-107-09341-6.

=== Articles ===
- Kreines, James (2004). "Hegel's Critique of Pure Mechanism and the Philosophical Appeal of the Logic Project". European Journal of Philosophy. 12 (1): 38–74. doi:10.1111/j.0966-8373.2004.00198.x.
- Kreines, James (2005). "The Inexplicability of Kant's Naturzweck: Kant on Teleology, Explanation and Biology". Archiv für Geschichte der Philosophie. 87 (3): 270–311. doi:10.1515/agph.2005.87.3.270.
- Kreines, James (2006). "Hegel's Metaphysics: Changing the Debate". Philosophy Compass. 1 (5): 466–480. doi:10.1111/j.1747-9991.2006.00033.x.
- Kreines, James (2008). "Kant on the Laws of Nature: Laws, Necessitation, and the Limitation of Our Knowledge". European Journal of Philosophy. 17 (4): 527–558. doi:10.1111/j.1468-0378.2008.00322.x.
- "The Logic of Life: Hegel's Philosophical Defense of Teleological Explanation of Living Beings". The Cambridge Companion to Hegel and Nineteenth-Century Philosophy. Vol. 1. Cambridge University Press. 2008. pp. 110–130. doi:10.1017/CCOL9780521831673.006. ISBN 9781139001946.
- Kreines, James (2016). "Metaphysical Grounding and Kant's Things in Themselves: On Allais' Manifest Reality". European Journal of Philosophy. 24 (1): 253–266. doi:10.1111/ejop.12140.
- Kreines, James (2017). "Kant on the Laws of Nature: Restrictive Inflationism and Its Philosophical Advantages". The Monist. 100 (3): 326–341. doi:10.1093/monist/onx013.
- Kreines, James (2022). "For a Dialectic-First Approach to Kant's Critique of Pure Reason". Open Philosophy. 5: 490–509. doi:10.1515/opphil-2022-0213.
- Kreines, James (2025). "Reasons for the Importance of the Post-Kantian Idea of a System: Nothing Halfway, Jacobi and Schelling". International Journal of Philosophical Studies. 32 (5): 606–639. doi:10.1080/09672559.2025.2456814.
- Kreines, James (2019). "Aristotelian Priority, Metaphysical Definitions of God and Hegel on Pure Thought as Absolute". Hegel Bulletin. 41 (1): 19–39. doi:10.1017/hgl.2019.21. ISSN 2051-5367.
