= God and the Self in Hegel =

2017 book by Paolo Diego Bubbio

God and the Self in Hegel: Beyond Subjectivism
- First edition
- Author: Diego Bubbio
- Language: English
- Subject: Georg Wilhelm Friedrich Hegel
- Publisher: SUNY Press
- Publication date: 2017
- Media type: Print (Hardcover and Paperback)
- Pages: 242
- ISBN: 978-1-4384-6525-8

God and the Self in Hegel: Beyond Subjectivism is a 2017 book by Paolo Diego Bubbio, in which the author argues that "Hegel’s conception of God and the self holds the key to overcoming subjectivism in both philosophy of religion and metaphysics".

== Content ==
In this book, Bubbio endorses a “qualified revisionist interpretation” of Hegel. The term “qualified revisionist” was coined by Paul Redding to refer to Beatrice Longuenesse’s tenets that Hegel’s metaphysics is “an investigation of the universal determinations of thought at work in any attempt to think what is” and that “metaphysics after Kant is a science of being as being thought”. Bubbio, however, introduces a further qualification: an interpretation of the objective reality that Hegel wants for metaphysical objects (including religious ideas, such as the idea of God) as mediated objectivity, to refer to “an objectivity that does not reflect the reality of an object distinct from and opposed to human consciousness, but an objectivity that takes into account the contribution of our self-conscious mind for the establishment of the content of that metaphysical object and thus reflects the relational unity between subject and object”. The same idea is expressed by Bubbio's iconic phrase that “our gaze is always already part of reality, and reality is such because it includes our gaze”. Translated on a religious level, Bubbio advocates for a figural interpretation of religious notions in Hegel's philosophy and he argues that, in Hegel's view, “subjectivism can be avoided, and content can be restored to religion, only to the extent that God is understood in God’s relation to human beings and human beings are understood in their relation to God”. This explains, according to Bubbio, why for Hegel self-knowledge and knowledge of God are mutually dependent – because this knowledge “is possible only in the context of an epistemological openness (perspectivism) and practical openness (recognition)”. Bubbio takes this to be “Hegel’s fundamental speculative intuition”. Hegel is therefore seen as providing an answer to the challenge of how to conceive the mind-world relation without setting mind over and against the world and as a way of overcoming subjectivism in both philosophy and religion. Also, in this way Bubbio connects his work on Hegel with his previous work on sacrifice, considered both in its epistemological and practical implications.

== Reception ==
God and the Self in Hegel received significant attention in the field of Hegel scholarship, re-igniting a debate about the status of the idea of God in Hegel's philosophy. Some scholars welcomed Bubbio's move enthusiastically: Cyril O’Regan wrote that “God and the Self in Hegel makes essential contributions to the understanding of Hegel’s philosophical thought” covering topics such as Hegel's famous ‘death of God’ trope “extraordinarily well”, and Philip T. Grier called it “an impressive and also challenging examination of Hegel’s philosophy of religion”. Other scholars, while acknowledging the value of Bubbio's reconstruction, were more critical about its outcome, precisely insofar as it advocates for the centrality of the idea of God in Hegel's philosophy.
