= Hegel's Idealism: The Satisfactions of Self-Consciousness =

1989 book by Robert B. Pippin

- Authors: Robert B. Pippin
- Language: English
- Subject: Georg Wilhelm Friedrich Hegel, Self-consciousness
- Publisher: Cambridge University Press
- Publication date: 1989
- Publication place: United Kingdom
- Media type: Print (Hardcover and Paperback)
- ISBN: 9780511621109

Hegel's Idealism: The Satisfactions of Self-Consciousness is a 1989 book by the philosopher Robert B. Pippin in which the author provides an analysis of Self-consciousness in Hegel's philosophy.

== Content ==
His 1989 book Hegel's Idealism: The Satisfactions of Self-Consciousness was a major contribution to Hegel studies. In it Pippin portrays Hegel as a thinker with fewer metaphysical commitments than are traditionally attributed to him. Hegel's claims about the "Absolute" and "Spirit" are interpreted in a vein that is more epistemological than ontological. Much of Hegel's project, in Pippin's reading, is a continuation rather than a reversal of the Kantian critique of dogmatic metaphysics. Hegel is not doing ontological logic, but is doing logic as metaphysics, which is a continuation of transcendental logic. Logic as metaphysics is the science of pure thought, or the thought of thought.

According to Pippin's non-metaphysical interpretation of Hegel, the Hegelian "Geist" (which is usually translated as "Spirit") is not a divine spiritual being, and accordingly Hegel's idealism is not a defense of monistic pantheism. According to Pippin, the Hegelian "Geist" should be understood as the totality of norms according to which we can justify our beliefs and actions. The important point is that we cannot justify anything except in such a normative logical space of reasons. So no kind of distinctively human rational cognition and action is articulatable or intelligible independently of such norms. In a phenomenological-hermeneutical jargon, these norms constitute a horizon, a perspective in which we can make anything intelligible to ourselves. Additionally, these norms are socio-historically articulated. Geist is the dynamic process of these norms and their transformations in human history. Hegel calls different articulations of these norms "shapes (Gestalten) of spirit". It should be added that any shape of spirit could collapse under the pressure of internal or external forces (such as internal inconsistencies in those norms or being faced with new forms of life with different norms) which lead to a crisis for the authority of those norms. But because of the actual plurality of shapes of spirit (or forms of life) any account of human agency which is socio-historical is in danger of getting into relativism. So Hegelian idealism is not a kind of return to pre-Kantian and pre-critical dogmatic metaphysics, but is trying to go beyond the Kantian critical project on the one hand, and historicist critiques of Kantian transcendental philosophy on the other.

These ideas could be attributed to many other philosophers, such as Herder, Heidegger, Gadamer, and MacIntyre. But according to the non-metaphysical interpretations of Hegel (such as Pippin's, Pinkard's and Redding's) there is a distinctive feature of the Hegelian approach - mutual recognition as the condition of free, self-determined and so authentic rational agency - which can transcend the alleged dangers of socio-historical relativism or, on the other hand, returning to dogmatic metaphysics or trans-historical subjectivity.

Such a revisionist reading of Hegel has gained a following, inspiring important works by Terry Pinkard, Paul Redding, Diego Bubbio and others, as well as influencing less historically-oriented philosophers of mind such as John McDowell and Robert Brandom. A similar movement to interpret Hegel as a "category-theorist" has been inspired in Germany by Klaus Hartmann.

== Reception ==
The book has been reviewed in History of European Ideas, German Studies Review and Journal of the History of Philosophy.
