= Robert Pippin =

American philosopher

- Born: Robert Buford Pippin; September 14, 1948 (age 78); Portsmouth, Virginia, U.S.

Academic background
- Education: Trinity College, Hartford; Pennsylvania State University (PhD)
- Thesis: Kant and the Problem of Transcendental Philosophy: Unity and Form in the "Critique of Pure Reason" (1974)
- Doctoral advisor: Stanley Rosen
- Other advisor: Thomas Seebohm

Academic work
- Era: Contemporary philosophy
- Region: Western philosophy
- School or tradition: Postanalytic; Hegelianism
- Doctoral students: Rachel Zuckert
- Notable students: Jon Stewart, James Kreines, Allen Speight, Dean Moyar
- Main interests: History of philosophy, epistemology, ethics, aesthetics, modernity, normativity
- Notable ideas: Non-metaphysical (or post-Kantian) interpretation of Hegel, Criticism of structuralism

Robert Buford Pippin (born September 14, 1948) is an American philosopher. He is the Evelyn Stefansson Nef Distinguished Service Professor at the John U. Nef Committee on Social Thought, the Department of Philosophy, and the college at the University of Chicago.

== Education and career ==
Pippin grew up in Jacksonville, Florida. His father was Ramon (Buford) Pippin and his mother was Rita Doris (née Cote) Pippin. He had a brother, Richard "Chilli" Pippin.

No one in his family had attended college, and his father, the son of a sharecropper, left school after the sixth grade. He was encouraged by a high school teacher to attend Trinity College in Hartford, Connecticut, where he earned his B.A. in English in 1970. Though he initially aspired to be a fiction writer, he developed a deep interest in philosophy through the influence of several charismatic teachers. Pippin went on to earn his M.A. in philosophy (with a minor in Greek) in 1972, and subsequently his Ph.D. in Philosophy from Pennsylvania State University on August 31, 1974, writing a dissertation on Kant’s theory of form under the direction of Stanley Rosen.

Before moving to Chicago, he taught for a number of years in the department of philosophy at UCSD, where he counted Henry Allison and Herbert Marcuse among his colleagues. In 2009 he held the Spinoza Chair of Philosophy at the University of Amsterdam. That same year, he was elected to the American Philosophical Society. Since 2014 he is PhD honoris causa at Uppsala University, Sweden. He currently resides in Chicago with his wife Joan. They have two adult children, Drew and Lauren.

In 2016 he became a member of the German Academy of Sciences Leopoldina. In 2019 he was awarded a Guggenheim fellowship.

== Philosophical work ==
Pippin is best known for his work on Hegel, but he has also published articles and books on Kant, Nietzsche, Proust, Hannah Arendt, Leo Strauss, Henry James, and on film (including the Hollywood Western, film noir, Alfred Hitchcock, and Douglas Sirk).

His 1989 book Hegel's Idealism: The Satisfactions of Self-Consciousness was a major contribution to Hegel studies. In it Pippin portrays Hegel as a thinker with fewer metaphysical commitments than are traditionally attributed to him. Hegel's claims about the "Absolute" and "Spirit" are interpreted in a more epistemological vein. A central thesis of Hegel's, according to Pippin, is that epistemology is metaphysic because to be is to be determinately intelligible. Much of Hegel's project, in Pippin's reading, is a continuation rather than a reversal of the Kantian critique of dogmatic metaphysics. Hegel is not doing ontological logic, but is doing logic as metaphysics, which is a continuation of transcendental logic. Logic as metaphysics is the science of pure thought, or the thought of thought.

For Pippin, Idealism as common to both Kant and Hegel, simply means that the subjective conditions for conceptual schemes are the necessary conditions of possibility for objective knowledge.

According to Pippin's non-metaphysical interpretation of Hegel, the Hegelian "Geist" (which is usually translated as "Spirit") is not a divine spiritual being, and accordingly Hegel's idealism is not a defense of monistic pantheism. According to Pippin, the Hegelian "Geist" should be understood as the totality of norms according to which we can justify our beliefs and actions. The important point is that we cannot justify anything except in such a normative logical space of reasons. So no kind of distinctively human rational cognition and action is articulatable or intelligible independently of such norms. In a phenomenological-hermeneutical jargon, these norms constitute a horizon, a perspective in which we can make anything intelligible to ourselves. Additionally, these norms are socio-historically articulated. Geist is the dynamic process of these norms and their transformations in human history. Hegel calls different articulations of these norms "shapes (Gestalten) of spirit". It should be added that any shape of spirit could collapse under the pressure of internal or external forces (such as internal inconsistencies in those norms or being faced with new forms of life with different norms) which lead to a crisis for the authority of those norms. But because of the actual plurality of shapes of spirit (or forms of life) any account of human agency which is socio-historical is in danger of getting into relativism. So Hegelian idealism is not a kind of return to pre-Kantian and pre-critical dogmatic metaphysics, but is trying to go beyond the Kantian critical project on the one hand, and historicist critiques of Kantian transcendental philosophy on the other.

These ideas could be attributed to many other philosophers, such as Herder, Heidegger, Gadamer, and MacIntyre. But according to the non-metaphysical interpretations of Hegel (such as Pippin's, Pinkard's and Redding's) there is a distinctive feature of the Hegelian approach - mutual recognition as the condition of free, self-determined and so authentic rational agency - which can transcend the alleged dangers of socio-historical relativism or, on the other hand, returning to dogmatic metaphysics or trans-historical subjectivity.

Such a revisionist reading of Hegel has gained a following, inspiring important works by Terry Pinkard, Paul Redding, Diego Bubbio and others, as well as influencing less historically oriented philosophers of mind such as John McDowell and Robert Brandom. A similar movement to interpret Hegel as a "category-theorist" has been inspired in Germany by Klaus Hartmann.

In Pippin's 1991 Modernism as a Philosophical Problem: On the Dissatisfactions of European High Culture, he develops what he calls a socio-cultural corollary to his 1989 work. He enters the debate on the legitimacy of the modernist project and the possibility of post-modernity. Still claiming to be interpreting Hegel, Pippin tries to defend modern, prosaic bourgeois society. Nonetheless, he admits that, and attempts to explore why, the dominant high culture of that society has been one of what might be termed self-hatred: he ranges from Flaubert and later modernist avant-gardes to the intellectual trends of New Historicism and Derridean deconstructive thought. Generally speaking, Pippin's argument is that modernity is "never-ending", that it is an attempt to bring greater rational transparency to all of our social practices and that much of the self-hatred of modern high culture is motivated by attempts to bring such transparency to areas where it had previously not existed. This process may never be completed but once it is begun, it cannot be stopped.

== Books ==
=== On Hegel ===
- Hegel's Realm of Shadows: Logic as Metaphysics in Hegel's Science of Logic (Chicago: University of Chicago Press, 2018).
- Pippin, Robert B. (2010-12-06). Hegel on Self-Consciousness: Desire and Death in the Phenomenology of Spirit. Princeton University Press. doi:10.1515/9781400836949. ISBN 978-1-4008-3694-9.
- Hegel’s Practical Philosophy: Rational Agency as Ethical Life (Cambridge: Cambridge University Press, 2008).
- Hegel on Ethics and Politics, eds. Robert Pippin and Otfried Höffe, Translated by Nicholas Walker, Introduction by Robert Pippin (Cambridge: Cambridge University Press, 2004).
- Idealism as Modernism: Hegelian Variations (Cambridge: Cambridge University Press, 1997).
- Hegel's Idealism: The Satisfactions of Self-Consciousness, (Cambridge: Cambridge University Press, 1989).

=== On Kant ===
- The Persistence of Subjectivity: On the Kantian Aftermath (Cambridge, Cambridge University Press, 2005).
- Kant's Theory of Form: An Essay on the 'Critique of Pure Reason' (New Haven: Yale University Press, 1982).

=== Others ===
- Marcuse: Critical Theory and The Promise of Utopia, eds. R. Pippin, A. Feenberg, C. Webel. MacMillan (Great Britain), Bergin and Garvey (USA), 1988.
- Modernism as a Philosophical Problem: On the Dissatisfactions of European High Culture (Oxford: Basil Blackwell, 1991).
- Henry James and Modern Moral Life (Cambridge: Cambridge University Press, 2000).
- Die Verwirklichung der Freiheit, foreword by Axel Honneth and Hans Joas (Frankfurt a.M.: Campus Verlag, 2005).
- Nietzsche, moraliste français: La conception nietzschéenne d'une psychologie philosophique (Paris: Odile Jacob, 2005).
- "Introduction" to Thus Spoke Zarathustra, and edited with Adrian Del Caro (Cambridge: Cambridge University Press, 2006).
- Nietzsche, Psychology, and First Philosophy (Chicago: University of Chicago Press, 2010).
- Hollywood Westerns and American Myth: The Importance of Howard Hawks and John Ford for Political Philosophy (New Haven: Yale University Press, 2010).
- Fatalism in American Film Noir: Some Cinematic Philosophy (University of Chicago Press, 2012).
- After the Beautiful: Hegel and the Philosophy of Pictorial Modernism (Chicago: University of Chicago Press, 2014).
- Interanimations: Receiving Modern German Philosophy (Chicago: University of Chicago Press, 2015).
- The Philosophical Hitchcock: "Vertigo" and the Anxieties of Unknowingness (Chicago: University of Chicago Press, 2017).
- Filmed Thought: Cinema as Reflective Form (Chicago: University of Chicago Press, 2020).
- Metaphysical Exile: On J. M. Coetzee's Jesus Fictions (Oxford: Oxford University Press, 2021).
- Philosophy by Other Means: The Arts in Philosophy and Philosophy in the Arts (Chicago: University of Chicago Press, 2021).
- Douglas Sirk: Filmmaker and Philosopher (London: Bloomsbury Publishing, 2021).
- The Culmination: Heidegger, German Idealism, and the Fate of Philosophy (Chicago: University of Chicago Press, 2024).
