= Brady Bowman =

American philosopher (born 1970)

- Born: 1970 (age 55–56)

Education
- Education: Free University Berlin (PhD)
- Thesis: Sinnliche Gewißheit : zur systematischen Vorgeschichte eines Problems des deutschen Idealismus (2001)

Philosophical work
- Era: Contemporary philosophy
- Region: Western philosophy
- School: German idealism
- Institutions: Penn State University
- Website: https://philosophy.la.psu.edu/people/blb42/

Brady Bowman (born 1970) is an American philosopher who is an associate professor of philosophy at Penn State University. His specialization is classical German philosophy, mostly Hegel, but also the period's other major figures, specially Jacobi and Schelling, as well as relevant early modern thinkers such as Descartes and Spinoza. He is the vice-president of the International Hegel Society and co-editor (with Birgit Sandkaulen) of the journal Hegel-Studien.

== Biography ==
Bowman received his first degree in philosophy and modern German literature from the Freie Universität Berlin. He earned his doctorate from the same University, by defending his dissertation Sinnliche Gewißheit : zur systematischen Vorgeschichte eines Problems des deutschen Idealismus in 2001. From 2000–2007, he was part of a DFG-funded Sonderforschungsbereich (collaborative research center) called "Ereignis Weimar-Jena: Kultur um 1800" at the University of Jena. He became a professor at Penn State in 2007.

In his 2013 book Hegel's Metaphysics of Absolute Negativity Bowman offers a metaphysical reading of Hegel, that both offers a 'radical transformation of philosophical critique' (as with Kantianism) and a 'compelling rehabilitation of rationalist metaphysics', that runs counter to the non-metaphysical readings of Hegel put forth by Robert Pippin, John McDowell and Terry Pinkard. In short Bowman sees Hegel's 'metaphysics of absolute negativity' as a response to critiques of metaphysics by Kant and Jacobi. The book has also been reviewed by Dean Moyar, Paul Gilad, Riccardo Pozzo, Giovanna Miolli, and Christophe Bouton among others.

== Selected publications ==
- Bowman, Brady (2013). Hegel and the Metaphysics of Absolute Negativity. doi:10.1017/CBO9781139520201. ISBN 978-1-139-52020-1.
- Hegel, Georg Wilhelm Fredrich (2009). Bowman, Brady; Speight, Allen (eds.). Georg Wilhelm Friedrich Hegel: Heidelberg Writings. doi:10.1017/CBO9780511596858. ISBN 978-0-521-83300-4.
