= Nabil el-khoury =

Lebanese philosopher and translator

Nabil Melhem el-Khoury (Arabic نبيل الخوري; born 5, April 1941 in Mtayleh, Lebanon) is a Lebanese philosopher and professor emeritus of philosophy at the Lebanese University in Beirut. His research focuses on Enlightenment philosophy, the Christian Orient, and the Christian-Islamic Dialogue.

He was the first non-European to be awarded The Ratzinger Prize for his scholarly work, together with Mario de França Miranda, in 2015. Translations into Arabic, including the works of Joseph Ratzinger, Goethe's Faust II, and texts by Kant, emphasize his contribution to the cultural exchange between Germany and the Arab world.

== Life ==
Nabil el-Khoury grew up as the eldest of nine children in a Christian-Druze village in the Chouf Mountains. A gifted student, at the age of twelve he was sent to the Jesuit boarding school in Ghazir. He then studied philosophy and theology at the Université Saint-Joseph, Beirut, with Peter Hans Kolvenbach, Father Sélim Abou and Abdo Khalifé. Early on, he became involved in improving living conditions in his native village. Thus he established there, with the support of Imam Musa as-Sadr, a medical health care center.

In 1965, he began studying at the Pontificia Università Urbaniana di Roma, where Cornelio Fabro and Antonio Piolanti were among his teachers. He continued his academic studies at the Universities of Tübingen and Regensburg, where he studied Philosophy, Theology, Political Science, Christian Orient and Linguistics. Notable among his teachers during this period were Ernst Bloch, Josef Simon, Joseph Ratzinger and Alexander Böhlig. In 1973, he received his doctorate in Tübingen under Walter Schulz with a dissertation entitled "The Interpretation of the World in Ephraem the Syrian."

From 1974 to 1977 he devoted himself to postdoctoral studies with Paul Ricoeur on the topic "Problèmes d'herméneutique: l'exemple du Liban" at the Sorbonne, Paris, worked at the Bavarian Academy of Sciences, Munich, with Hermann Krings, Xavier Tilliette, Walter Schulz, Hans Michael Baumgartner, and Wilhelm G. Jacobs on the historical-critical edition of Schelling’s works, and completed his habilitation at LMU Munich with a work entitled "Vernunft und Staat bei Hegel," (reason and state in Hegel) a work that was also intended as an appeal to the state of Lebanon, which was engulfed in civil war.

From 1977, el-Khoury held a chair of philosophy at the Lebanese University and numerous visiting professorships at the universities of Tübingen, Eichstätt, Mainz, Freiburg and Salzburg. He retired in 2005.

== Works (selection) ==
- Jesus von Nazareth / Joseph Ratzinger (Benedict XVI). Arabic translation and introduction by Nabil el-Khoury. 3 Vol. Librairie Pauliste de Jounieh. 2016. ISBN 978-9953-0-3152-1
- Letzte Gespräche / Joseph Ratzinger (Benedict XVI). Arabic translation and introduction by Nabil el-Khoury. Librairie Pauliste de Jounieh. 2018. ISBN 978-9953-0-4284-8
- Einführung in das Christentum / Josef Ratzinger with introduction from Patriarch Ignatius IV. Arabic translation by Nabil el-Khoury. Beirut, 1994
- Vernunft und Staat bei Hegel. Dt.-Arab. Verlag, Beirut, 1989
- Die Interpretation der Welt bei Ephraem dem Syrer: Beitr. zur Geistesgeschichte. Matthias-Grünewald-Verlag, Mainz, 1976. ISBN 978-3-7867-0510-9
