= Peter Stuhlmacher =

German theologian (1932–2025)

- Stuhlmacher in the 1980s
- Born: 18 January 1932; Leipzig, Weimar Republic
- Died: 5 April 2025 (aged 93)
- Occupations: Theologian; professor
- Known for: New Testament studies

Academic background
- Education: University of Tübingen; University of Göttingen

Peter Stuhlmacher (German: [ˈpeːtɐ ˈstuːlˌmaxɐ]; 18 January 1932 – 5 April 2025) was a German Protestant theologian and professor of New Testament studies at the University of Tübingen from 1972 to 2000. Several of his books were translated into English and other languages.

== Early life and career ==
Stuhlmacher was born in Leipzig on 18 January 1932. His father came from a pastor's household in Pomerania, had studied economics, and became a journalist; he also served in the army from 1939. His mother came from a book-seller's family. Stuhlmacher attended the Thomasschule from 1942; a year later the school moved to Grimma because of bombings of Leipzig, and the boy and his mother followed. In 1947 they moved to Stuttgart, where they reunited with his father. Stuhlmacher then attended the Eberhard-Ludwigs-Gymnasium. He became active in the local parish, Markusgemeinde, where speakers at regular events included Helmut Claß.

Stuhlmacher studied Protestant theology from 1951 to 1958 at the universities of Tübingen and Göttingen. He then worked as an assistant to Ernst Käsemann in Tübingen. There he earned his doctorate in 1962 and his habilition in 1967, focusing on the New Testament. Stuhlmacher was professor of New Testament studies at the University of Erlangen from 1968, and professor of New Testament studies at the University of Tübingen from 1972. He was interested in the New Testament in the context of the complete Bible. His book Jesus of Nazareth-Christ of Faith was published in 1993, and in 1997 a Festschrift was published in his honour. Evangelium – Schriftauslegung – Kirche: Festschrift für Peter Stuhlmacher zum 65. Geburtstag included contributions from Brevard Childs, James Dunn, E. Earle Ellis, Scott J. Hafemann, Martin Hengel, and Ben F. Meyer. He was emerited in 2000. His international students include Jostein Ådna, Scott J. Hafemann, and Chong Hyon Sung.

== Personal life and death ==
Stuhlmacher was married. From 2000, he took care of his sick wife at home and as a result reduced his scientific work. He remained engaged in the church and open to discussions about theology and philosophy. He was invited by Pope Benedict XVI to the 2008 meeting of the Ratzinger Circle of Alumni, along with his friend Martin Hengel; their conversations about Jesus resulted in a book.

Stuhlmacher died on 5 April 2025, at the age of 93.

== Works ==
Works by Stuhlmacher have been translated into English, French, Dutch, Italian, Norwegian, Korean, and Japanese.

=== Books ===
- Stuhlmacher, Peter (1977). Historical Criticism and Theological Interpretation of Scripture: toward a hermeneutics of consent. Philadelphia, PA: Fortress Press. ISBN 978-0-8006-1258-0. OCLC 3511688.
- ——— (1986). Reconciliation, Law, & Righteousness: essays in Biblical theology. Philadelphia, PA: Fortress Press. ISBN 978-0-8006-0770-8. OCLC 12804902.
- ——— (1991). The Gospel and the Gospels. Grand Rapids, MI: Eerdmans. ISBN 978-0-8028-3688-5. OCLC 22494695.
- ——— (1994). Paul's Letter to the Romans: a commentary. Louisville, KY: Westminster John Knox Press. ISBN 978-0-664-25287-8. OCLC 29255388.
- ——— (1993). Jesus of Nazareth, Christ of faith. Peabody, MA: Hendrickson Publishers. ISBN 978-1-56563-009-3. OCLC 28374996.
- ——— (1995). How to do Biblical Theology. Princeton theological monograph series. Vol. 38. Allison Park, PA: Pickwick Publications. ISBN 978-1-55635-026-9. OCLC 32131149.
- ——— (2001). Revisiting Paul's Doctrine of Justification: a challenge to the new perspective. Downers Grove, IL: InterVarsity Press. ISBN 978-0-8308-2661-2. OCLC 47013133.
- ——— (2018). Biblical Theology of the New Testament. Grand Rapids, MI: Eerdmans. ISBN 978-0-8028-4080-6. OCLC 1011625231. - translated from the 1992 German title Biblische Theologie des Neuen Testaments

=== Edited by ===
- ———; Janowski, Bernd, eds. (2004). The Suffering Servant: Isaiah 53 in Jewish and Christian sources. Grand Rapids, MI: Eerdmans. ISBN 978-0-8028-0845-5. OCLC 55738219.
