= Intellectual Sacrifice and Other Mimetic Paradoxes =

2018 book about sacrifice by Paolo Diego Bubbio

- First edition (English)
- Author: Diego Bubbio
- Language: English
- Subject: sacrifice, mimetic theory
- Publisher: Michigan State University Press
- Publication date: 2018
- Media type: Print
- Pages: 244 pp.
- ISBN: 978-1611862737

Intellectual Sacrifice and Other Mimetic Paradoxes is a 2018 book about sacrifice by Paolo Diego Bubbio, in which the author examines Rene Girard’s mimetic theory. This book collects Bubbio's most significant writings on the topic, and is presented as his intellectual journey over two decades (from 1999 to 2019) through mimetic theory.

== Content ==
The first part is a revised translation of a short book originally published in Italian in 1999: the central thesis here is that philosophy and religion can be regarded as subjects involved in a mimetic rivalry on the intellectual level. In the chapters of the second part of the book, Bubbio addresses several topics developing the dialogue between Girard’s mimetic theory and the Post-Kantian philosophical tradition, and in particular contemporary philosophical hermeneutics. In the final chapter, Bubbio advocates for the need of developing mimetic theory into Hermeneutic Mimetic Theory (or HMT). According to Bubbio, HMT can solve some of the internal problems of mimetic theory in its original version, and at the same time it can offer a meaningful contribution to the development of a new paradigm of the “I”.

== See also ==
- Sacrifice in the Post-Kantian Tradition
