= Ratzinger Foundation =

Charitable organization

- Founded: 21 December 2007
- Type: Charitable organization
- Location: Munich, Germany
- Fields: The promotion of theology in the spirit of Joseph Ratzinger
- Key people: President Giuseppe Antonio Scotti; Camillo Cardinal Ruini, head of the scientific committee; Father Federico Lombardi, S.J., chairman of the board of directors; Christoph Cardinal Schönborn
- Revenue: £1.6 million
- Website: ratzinger-papst-benedikt-stiftung.de (German); fondazioneratzinger.va/content/fondazioneratzinger/it.html

The Ratzinger Foundation, also known as The Pope Benedict XVI Foundation, is a charitable organization whose aim is "the promotion of theology in the spirit of Joseph Ratzinger." which it achieves by funding scholarships and bursaries for poorer students across the world. The foundation was launched on the initiative of the Ratzinger Circle of Alumni in December 2007.

The foundation makes much of its money from the selling of Pope Benedict XVI's writings. In 2007, £1.6 million was raised for the charity by the selling of Pope Benedict's biography on Christ, Jesus of Nazareth.

The charity also receives private donations and has close links with the Ratzinger Circle of Alumni (Ratzinger Schülerkreis), a group of theology students who, at doctoral and post-doctoral level, studied under the tutorship of then Professor Ratzinger. The Circle was formed after Ratzinger was elevated to the position of Archbishop of Munich.

== Ratzinger Prize ==
At the 2010 meeting, it was announced that Pope Benedict XVI had decided to donate a sizable sum of money for the establishment of a sort of 'Nobel Prize in Theology' (as Camillo Ruini called it) in recognition of those who perform promising scholarly research relating to or expounding upon his work; it was named the Ratzinger Prize, and each winner will receive a check for $87,000. The Prize is awarded in three areas: Sacred Scripture study, patristics and fundamental theology.

On Thursday, 30 June 2011 Benedict XVI presented the three inaugural prizes to the winners in a ceremony at the papal residence, the Apostolic Palace, in the Vatican:

- Reverend Professor Olegario González de Cardedal, a Spanish priest and professor specializing in dogmatic and fundamental theology at the Pontifical University of Salamanca in Salamanca, Spain;
- Reverend Professor Maximilian Heim, O.Cist. was born as Heinrich Josef Heim in Kronach on 14 April 1961. He earned his master in theology at the University of Vienna in 1987 and was ordained a priest at Heiligenkreuz in 1988. In 2003 Heim earned his PhD concentrating on the ecclesiology of cardinal Joseph Ratzinger. He went on to teach fundamental theology at the University of Heiligenkreuz. The awarded work is called Joseph Ratzinger: Life in the Church and Living Theology: Fundamentals of Ecclesiology. He is abbot of Heiligenkreuz monastery in Austria.
- Professor Manlio Simonetti was born in Rome on 2 May 1926 (and died on 2 November 2017). In June 1947 he completed his classical studies at the Sapienza University of Rome, where he became professor for Christian history in 1969. He was respected as an expert in Ancient Christian studies and Patristic Biblical interpretation. He was a member of the Accademia dei Lincei.

On Saturday, 28 September 2012, it was announced that the 2012 winners of the Ratzinger Prize were:

- Reverend Professor Brian E. Daley, S.J., an American Jesuit who is Catherine F. Huisking Professor of Theology at the University of Notre Dame in Notre Dame, Indiana.
- Professor Rémi Brague, a French professor emeritus of medieval Arabic Philosophy at the Sorbonne in Paris, and is professor of philosophy or religion at LMU Munich. He is married and has four children.

On Friday, 21 June 2013, the 2013 winners were announced:

- Reverend Professor Richard A. Burridge, Dean of King's College London
- Professor Christian Schaller

The laureates in 2014 were:

- Anne-Marie Pelletier
- Waldemar Chrostowski

The laureates in 2015 were:

- Nabil el-Khoury (born 1941), Lebanese theologian
- Mario de França Miranda, S.J. (born 1936), Brazilian theologian

The laureates in 2016 were:

- Ioannis Kourempeles
- Inos Biffi

The laureates in 2017 were:

- Professor Karl-Heinz Menke, a Catholic
- Professor Theodor Dieter, a Lutheran
- Maestro Arvo Pärt, an Orthodox classical music composer

Also in 2017, the first edition of the "Ragione Aperta" (Open Reason) Prizes, for research (Darcia Narvaez; and Claudia Vanney and Juan Franck), and for teaching (Michael Schuck, Nancy Tuchman, and Michael Garanzini; and Sarolta Laura Baritz), were presented by the foundation.

The 2018 laureates were:

- Professor Marianne Schlosser, a Catholic professor of spiritual theology at the University of Wien, and a member of the International Theological Commission and the Commission on the Female Diaconate.
- Mario Botta a Swiss Catholic architect who has designed multiple modern and postmodern religious buildings.

The 2019 laureates were:

- Charles Taylor, Canadian philosopher and professor emeritus at McGill University.
- Paul Béré, a Jesuit priest from Burkina Faso and the first African winner of the prize.

The 2020 laureates were:

- Jean-Luc Marion, French theologian, phenomenologist, and historian of philosophy
- Tracey Rowland, Australian theologian

The 2021 laureates were:

- Hanna-Barbara Gerl-Falkovitz, German Catholic philosopher and director of the European Institute of Philosophy and Religion at the Benedict XVI Philosophical-Theological University in Austria
- Ludger Schwienhorst-Schönberger, German Catholic professor of the Old Testament at the University of Vienna

The 2022 laureates were:

- Michel Fédou, Jesuit professor and theologian
- Joseph Weiler, Law professor

The 2023 laureates were:

- Pablo Blanco Sarto, Spanish philosopher and theologian at the University of Navarre
- Torralba Roselló, Spanish philosopher and theologian at Ramon Llull University

The 2024 laureates were:

- Cyril O'Regan, Irish theologian at the University of Notre Dame
- Etsuro Sotoo, Japanese sculptor

The 2025 laureate was:

- Riccardo Muti, conductor

The 2026 laureate is:

- John C. Cavadini, American theologian at the University of Notre Dame
