= Jon Stewart (philosopher) =

American philosopher

Academic background
- Education: University of California, San Diego (PhD)
- Thesis: The transition from "Consciousness" to "Self-consciousness" in Hegel's "Phenomenology of Spirit" (1992)
- Academic advisor: Robert Pippin

Academic work
- Era: Contemporary philosophy
- Region: Western philosophy
- School or tradition: German Idealism, Existentialism
- Institutions: Slovak Academy of Sciences
- Website: https://www.jonstewart.dk

Jon Bartley Stewart is an American philosopher and historian of philosophy. He specializes in 19th century Continental philosophy with an emphasis on the thought of Kierkegaard and Hegel. He has also worked in the field of Scandinavian Studies and has made the culture of the Danish Golden Age better known internationally. Stewart currently works as a researcher at the Institute of Philosophy at the Slovak Academy of Sciences.

== Education and career ==
Stewart earned his BA in Philosophy in 1984 from the University of California, Santa Cruz, where he studied with David Hoy. He received his MA in 1986 and his PhD in 1992 from the University of California, San Diego, where he studied with Robert B. Pippin, Frederick A. Olafson and Henry Allison.

After his dissertation he worked at a post-doctoral scholar at the Westfälische Wilhelms-Universität Münster (where he worked with Ludwig Siep), the Université Libre in Brussels (where he worked with Marc Richir), and the Humboldt-Universität in Berlin (where he worked with Volker Gerhardt).

Starting in 1996 Stewart worked for several years at the Søren Kierkegaard Research Centre at the University of Copenhagen. In 2003 he defended his Habilitation thesis at the Faculty of Theology at the University of Copenhagen. In 2007 he completed a second Habilitation thesis, this time in Philosophy. In the same year he was elected into the Royal Danish Academy of Sciences and Letters. He worked at Harvard University from 2016 to 2017.

He has held guest professorships the University of Iceland (2005), the Universidad de los Andes, Santiago de Chile (2010), the Universidad Iberoamericana, Mexico City (2014), the Charles University, Prague (2019), University of Szeged, Hungary (2019, 2021), and the Universidad Panamericana, Aguascalientes, Mexico (2021-2023).

He has won the Book Prize of the Slovak Academy of Science in the years 2019, 2020, 2021, and 2023. In the year 2022 he was awarded the Slovak Academy of Sciences Prize for Scholarly Work for previous year.

In 2020 he was awarded the title Professor h.c. by the University of Szeged, Hungary.

In 2021 he was the recipient of The Slovak Academy of Sciences’ Honorary Plaque of Ľudovít Štúr for Services to the Humanities and Social Sciences.

His book Hegel’s Century: Alienation and Recognition in a Time of Revolution, (Cambridge: Cambridge University Press 2021) won the PROSE Award for 2022 for the category “Philosophy,” awarded by The Association of American Publishers.

He is currently the editor-in-chief of the journal Filozofia, and the co-editor of the Kierkegaard Studies Yearbook and Kierkegaard Studies Monograph Series (De Gruyter). He is the series editor of New Research in the History of Western Philosophy, Texts from Golden Age Denmark, and 'Danish Golden Age Studies (Brill). From 2007-2017 he was the editor-in-chief of the now completed series, Kierkegaard Research: Sources, Reception and Resources (Aldershot: Ashgate 2007-2015; New York: Routledge 2016-2017).

== Academic work ==
Stewart's second book, Kierkegaard's Relations to Hegel Reconsidered (New York: Cambridge University Press 2003) marked a major shift in Kierkegaard studies. It was widely reviewed in academic journals, as well as by a Danish newspaper. It is generally agreed that Kierkegaard's Relations to Hegel Reconsidered impacted research in many ways.

In continuing to show the relevance of culture and history to understanding the intellectual and philosophical debates of the Danish Golden Age, in 2007 Stewart published A History of Hegelianism in Golden Age Denmark, Tome I, The Heiberg Period: 1824-1836 (Copenhagen: C.A. Reitzel 2007) and A History of Hegelianism in Golden Age Denmark, Tome II, The Martensen Period: 1837-1842 (Copenhagen: C.A. Reitzel 2007). These studies constituted the most detailed investigations into the influence of Hegel's philosophy on Danish Golden Age culture.

== Books ==
- The Unity of Hegel’s Phenomenology of Spirit: A Systematic Interpretation, Evanston, Illinois: Northwestern University Press 2000 (Northwestern University SPEP Studies in Historical Philosophy). xv + 556pp. (re-issue, paperback, 2011.) (Spanish translation: La Unidad de la Fenomenología del espíritu de Hegel. Una interpretación sistemática, trans. by Carlos Mendiola Mejía, Mexico City: Universidad Iberoamericana 2014.)
- Kierkegaard’s Relations to Hegel Reconsidered, New York: Cambridge University Press 2003 (Modern European Philosophy). xix + 695pp. (re-issue, paperback, 2007.) (Japanese translation: 『キェルケゴールは反ヘーゲル主義者だったのか？ 彼のヘーゲルへの関わりを再吟味する』[Was Kierkegaard Anti-Hegelian? His Relations to Hegel Reconsidered], trans. by Kinya Masugata (supervisor), Kiyoshi Ito, Kota Kinose, Keisuke Yoshida, Teruyuki Kasumi, Takaya Suto, Masaya Honda, Shin Fujieda, Mime Morita, Yusuke Ono, Takashi Yanagisawa, Hideki Goto, Yusuke Suzuki, and Tomomichi Baba, Nara: Kizasu Shobo 2023.)
- A History of Hegelianism in Golden Age Denmark, Tome I, The Heiberg Period: 1824-1836, Copenhagen: C.A. Reitzel 2007. xxi + 629pp. (Danish Golden Age Studies, vol. 3.)
- A History of Hegelianism in Golden Age Denmark, Tome II, The Martensen Period: 1837-1842, Copenhagen: C.A. Reitzel 2007. xx + 775pp. (Danish Golden Age Studies, vol. 3.)
- Idealism and Existentialism: Hegel and Nineteenth- and Twentieth-Century European Philosophy, New York and London: Continuum International Publishing 2010. xv + 282pp. (re-issue, paperback, 2012.)
- The Unity of Content and Form in Philosophical Writing: The Perils of Conformity, London, New Delhi, New York and Sydney: Bloomsbury 2013 (Bloomsbury Studies in Philosophy). ix + 217pp.
- The Cultural Crisis of the Danish Golden Age: Heiberg, Martensen and Kierkegaard, Copenhagen: Museum Tusculanum Press 2015 (Danish Golden Age Studies, vol. 9). xxii + 337pp.
- Søren Kierkegaard: Subjectivity, Irony and the Crisis of Modernity, Oxford: Oxford University Press 2015. xvii + 210pp. (re-issue, paperback, 2017.) (Portuguese translation: Søren Kierkegaard: Subjetividade, Ironia e a Crise da Modernidade, trans. by Humberto Quaglio, Petrópolis, RJ: Vozes 2017. Spanish translation: Søren Kierkegaard: subjetividad, ironía y la crisis de la Modernidad, trans. by Azucena Palavicini Sánchez, Mexico City: Universidad Iberoamericana 2017. Chinese translation: 克尔凯郭尔：丹麦黄金时代的苏格拉底 trans. by Tianwang Jinjian, Beijing: Huaxia Press 2018. Korean translation: 쇠렌 키르케고르 입문：주관성, 아이러니, 현대성의 위기 trans. by Changwoo Lee, and Jeong In Choi, SeJong: Karis Academy 2023.)
- Hegel’s Interpretation of the Religions of the World: The Logic of the Gods, Oxford: Oxford University Press 2018. xix + 321pp. (Korean translation: 헤겔 <종교철학> 입문, trans. by Jeong Jin-Woo, Seoul: Dong Yeon Publishing Co. 2023.)
- Faust, Romantic Irony, and System: German Culture in the Thought of Søren Kierkegaard, Copenhagen: Museum Tusculanum Press 2019 (Danish Golden Age Studies, vol. 11). xviii + 407pp.
- The Emergence of Subjectivity in the Ancient and Medieval World: An Interpretation of Western Civilization, Oxford: Oxford University Press 2020. xiv + 399pp.
- Hegel’s Century: Alienation and Recognition in a Time of Revolution, Cambridge: Cambridge University Press 2021. xi + pp. 338pp.
- An Introduction to Hegel’s Lectures on the Philosophy of Religion: The Issue of Religious Content in the Enlightenment and Romanticism, Oxford: Oxford University Press 2022. xiii + 277pp. (Korean translation: 헤겔 <종교철학> 입문, trans. by Jeong Jin-Woo, Seoul: Dong Yeun Press 2023. 523pp.)
- A History of Nihilism in the Nineteenth Century: Confrontations with Nothingness, Cambridge: Cambridge University Press 2023. xi + 322pp.

== Translation monographs ==
- Heiberg’s On the Significance of Philosophy for the Present Age and Other Texts, ed. and trans. by Jon Stewart, Copenhagen: C.A. Reitzel 2005. xxii + 467pp. (Texts from Golden Age Denmark, vol. 1.)
- Heiberg’s Speculative Logic and Other Texts, ed. and trans. by Jon Stewart, Copenhagen: C.A. Reitzel 2006. xviii + 387pp. (Texts from Golden Age Denmark, vol. 2.)
- Heiberg’s Introductory Lecture to the Logic Course and Other Texts, ed. and trans. by Jon Stewart, Copenhagen: C.A. Reitzel 2007. xvii + 334pp. (Texts from Golden Age Denmark, vol. 3.)
- Heiberg’s Contingency Regarded from the Point of View of Logic and Other Texts, ed. and trans. by Jon Stewart, Copenhagen: Museum Tusculanum Press 2008. xvi + 457pp. (Texts from Golden Age Denmark, vol. 4.)
- Mynster’s “Rationalism, Supernaturalism” and the Debate about Mediation, ed. and trans. by Jon Stewart, Copenhagen: Museum Tusculanum Press 2009. xvi + 683pp. (Texts from Golden Age Denmark, vol. 5.)
- Heiberg’s Perseus and Other Texts, ed. and trans. by Jon Stewart, Copenhagen: Museum Tusculanum Press 2011. xiii + 408pp. (Texts from Golden Age Denmark, vol. 6.)
- Sibbern’s Remarks and Investigations Primarily Concerning Hegel’s Philosophy, ed. and trans. by Jon Stewart, Copenhagen: Museum Tusculanum Press 2018. xvi + 451pp. (Texts from Golden Age Denmark, vol. 7.)
- Poul Martin Møller’s Thoughts on the Possibility of Proofs of Human Immortality and Other Texts, ed. and trans. by Finn Gredal Jensen and Jon Stewart, Leiden and Boston: Brill 2022. xxi + 515pp. (Texts from Golden Age Denmark, vol. 8).

== Public Interviews and Newspaper Articles ==
- Peter Daubner, “Americký filozof zo SAV: Žijeme v globalizovanom svete, ktorý je veľmi prepojený. Ak chceme dobre filozofovať, musíme byť jeho súčasťou (rozhovor),” actuality.sk, February 9, 2025.
- Andrea Nozdrovická, “Autori a autorky špičkových publikácií si prevzali ocenenia,” September 18, 2024:
- Podcast for Hermitix, March 13, 2024: James Ellis, “Nihilism of the 19th Century with Jon Stewart”
- Katarína Gáliková, “SAV ocenila autorov a autorky špičkových publikácií,” September 18, 2023:
- Podcast for New Books Network, August 9, 2023: Morteza Hajizadeh, “Jon Stewart, A History of Nihilism in the Nineteenth Century: Confrontations with Nothingness, Cambridge University Press 2023”.
- Matúš Beňo, “An American Philosopher in Slovakia: I have done my best work here,” The Slovak Spectator, September 5, 2022 (online).
- Peter Dlhopolec, “American’s win celebrated in Slovakia,” Slovak Spectator, February 4, 2022.
- Eliana de Castro, “Jon Stewart: ‘Kierkegaard Has a Special Gift for Discussing Human Perennial Issues,” in Fausto Mag., November 27, 2017.

== Grants and fellowships ==
- 1989-1999: Westfälische Wilhelms University, Münster, German Academic Exchange Service (DAAD)
- 1992-1993: Westfälische Wilhelms University, Münster, Heinrich Hertz Foundation
- 1993-1994: Free University Brussels, Belgian American Educational Foundation
- 1994-1995: Humboldt University, Berlin, Alexander von Humboldt Foundation
- 1995-1997: Spencer Post-Doctoral Fellowship, National Academy of Education
- 2008-2009: Collegium Budapest, Institute for Advanced Study
- 2016-2017: Harvard University, Radcliffe Institute for Advanced Study

== Group grants and projects ==
- 2005-2006: Project Coordinator, Øresund Summer University Courses, Søren Kierkegaard Research Centre, University of Copenhagen
- 2005-2007: Project leader, “Kierkegaard Research: Sources, Reception and Resources” funded by the Danish Research Council for the Humanities (Statens Humanistiske Forskningsråd), a branch of the Danish Research Agency
- 2011-2014: Project leader, “The Nordic Network for Kierkegaard Research” funded by Nordforsk.
- 2019-2022: Project leader, “Individual and Collective Subjectivity: Historical and Contemporary Issues,” cooperation of the Institute of Philosophy at the Slovak Academy of Sciences and the Institute of Philosophy at the Polish Academy of Sciences, supported by Inter-Academic Agreement, MAD (Medziakademická dohoda).
