= Michael Zank =

German philosopher

Michael Zank is a German-born American author, specializing in Jewish theology and philosophy.

== Work and career ==
He studied Christian and Jewish theology in Germany before moving to the United States, after spending some time in Israel. He received his PhD in Near Eastern and Judaic Studies at Brandeis University. From 2013 to 2022 he served as the director of the Elie Wiesel Center for Jewish Studies. He teaches introductory level courses on the Bible and Jerusalem, as well as advanced courses in the philosophy of religion. He is considered to be a leading expert in German Jewish intellectual history. He works on Hermann Cohen, Martin Buber, Franz Rosenzweig and Leo Strauss. He studied at Hebrew University in the 1980s and is interested in the combination of spirituality and violence the city has displayed. He currently maintains a few Jerusalem-related websites including "Jerusalem in Time, Space, and the Imagination" among others.

== Published work ==
=== Author ===
==== Books ====
- The Idea of Atonement in the Philosophy of Hermann Cohen (2nd ed.). Providence, RI: Brown Judaic Studies Open Humanities Book Program. 2020. doi:10.26300/1rsr-8a22. ISBN 9781951498702. LCCN 2019953796.
- Jerusalem. A Brief History. Oxford: Wiley-Blackwell. 2018. ISBN 978-1-405-17972-0.
- Jüdische Religionsphilosophie als Apologie des Mosaismus (in German). Tübingen: Mohr Siebeck. 2016. ISBN 9783161547331.

==== Articles ====
- "Literary Aspects of Philosophical Writing. The Case of Maimonides’ Guide of the Perplexed" in Beniamino Fortis, Ellen Rinner, Lars Tittmar (eds.), Philosophy and Jewish Thought. Theoretical Intersections. Transcript Verlag, 2024, 157-181. (https://www.transcript-verlag.de/978-3-8376-7292-3/philosophy-and-jewish-thought/)
- "A Peripheral Field. Meditations on the Status of Jewish Philosophy" in M. David Eckel and Try Dujardin, The Future of the Philosophy of Religion. Boston Series in Philosophy and Religion. Springer Verlag (2021), 179-189.
- "Justice" in The Cambridge History of Jewish Philosophy: The Modern Era, edited by Martin Kavka, Zachary Braiterman, and David Novak (Cambridge, New York, etc.: Cambridge University Press, 2012), pp. 704–738.
- "Strauss, Schmitt, and Peterson: Comparative Contours of the ‘Theological Political Predicament’" in German-Jewish Thought Between Religion and Politics. FS Mendes Flohr, ed. Martina Urban and Christian Wiese (Berlin: Walter de Gruyter, 2012), pp. 317-333.
- "Jasper’s Achsenzeit Hypothesis: A Critical Reappraisal" in 30th-Anniversary Festschrift for the Karl Jaspers Society of North America, Philosophical Faith and the Future of Humanity, ed. Alan Olson, Greg Walters, and Helmut Wautischer (Amsterdam: Springer Verlag, 2012), pp. 189–202.
- "Les conceptions politique de Franz Rosenzweig" in Myriam Bienenstock (ed.), Héritages de Franz Rosenzweig: Nous et les autres (Paris: Éditions de l’Éclat, 2011), pp. 208–220
- "Arousing Suspicion Against a Prejudice: Leo Strauss and the Study of Maimonides’ Guide of the Perplexed" in Moses Maimonides (1138-1204) - His Religious, Scientific, and Philosophical Wirkungsgeschichte in Different Cultural Contexts, ed. by Görge K. Hasselhoff and Otfried Fraisse (Ex Oriente Lux: Rezeptionen und Exegesen als Traditionskritik, vol. 4) Würzburg: Ergon Verlag, 2004, pp. 549–571.
- "STRAUSS, SCHMITT Y PETERSON. CONTORNOS COMPARATIVOS DEL “PROBLEMA TEOLÓGICO-POLÍTICO”". La Torre Del Virrey, Vol. 1, n.º 25, 2019/1, enero de 2019, pp. 31-47, https://revista.latorredelvirrey.es/LTV/article/view/86
- "A Putative (Private) Life of Hannah Arendt: Bio-portraiture as performance in the work of Miriam Shenitzer" in Performance Philosophy Journal vol. 5/1 (2019). DOI: https://doi.org/10.21476/PP.2019.51272
- "The Jerusalem Basic Law (1980/2000) and the Jerusalem Embassy Act (1990/95): A comparative investigation of Israeli and US legislation on the status of Jerusalem," in: Israel Studies 21.3 (2016), 20-35.
- "Zwischen den Stühlen? On the Taxonomic Anxieties of Modern Jewish Philosophy" in European Journal for Jewish Studies (EJJS), vol. 1, no. 1 (2007), 105-134.
- "The Rosenzweig-Rosenstock Triangle, or, What Can We Learn From Letters to Gritli?" in Modern Judaism, vol. 23 nr. 1 (February 2003), 74-98.

==== Reference articles ====
- "Buber, Martin" in Neue Deutsche Biographie-online URL: https://www.deutsche-biographie.de/118516477.html#dbocontent (published March 1, 2024).
- "Metaphor: D. Modern Judaism" in Encyclopedia of the Bible and Its Reception (EBR), vol 18, Berlin: Walter de Gruyter, 2020, 988-992.
- "Blasphemie" in Lexikon für Evangelische Theologie und Gemeinde 2nd edition. Vol. 1 (2017), 945-7.
- "Zion" in Enzyklopädie jüdischer Geschichte und Kultur ed. Dan Diner, vol. 6. (Stuttgart: J.B. Metzler Verlag, 2015), 564-567.
- "Martin Buber" sole author of 2004 entry (revised 2007); lead author of major revision (with Zachary Braiterman, co-author) 2014 in The Stanford Encyclopedia of Philosophy (Winter 2014 Edition), Edward N. Zalta (ed.), URL http://plato.stanford.edu/entries/buber/.
- "Apikoros" in Enzyklopädie jüdischer Geschichte und Kultur ed. Dan Diner. Stuttgart: J.B. Metzler Verlag, vol. 1 (2011).

=== Editor ===
- New Perspectives on Martin Buber, Series: Religion in Philosophy and Theology, ed. Ingo Dalferth, vol. 22, Tübingen: Mohr Siebeck, 2006. (Editor, translator, and contributor.) ISBN 3-161-48998-5
- Take A Teacher, Make A Friend. Students Write for Elie Wiesel, edited by Michael Zank and Leanne Hoppe, with an introduction by Michael Zank (Boston: Elie Wiesel Center for Judaic Studies, 2014).
- The Value of the Particular: Lessons from Judaism and the Modern Jewish Experience, Festschrift for Steven T. Katz on the Occasion of his Seventieth Birthday, edited by Michael Zank and Ingrid Anderson, with the editorial assistance of Sarah Leventer and an introduction by Michael Zank [Series: Journal for Jewish Thought and Philosophy Supplementa, ed. Elliot Wolfson et al.], Boston: Brill, 2015.
- Leo Strauss : The Early Writings, 1921-1932, State University of New York Press (2002) ISBN 0-7914-5329-4
- Politics, Religion and Political Theology. Edited by Allen Speight and Michael Zank [Boston Series in Philosophy and Religion, ed. Allen Speight, vol. 3], Amsterdam: Springer Verlag, 2017.
