= Bubbio (disambiguation) =

Bubbio is a comune in the Province of Asti in the Italian region Piedmont.

Bubbio may refer to:

- Diego Bubbio, Italian philosopher and Associate Professor of Philosophy at Western Sydney University
- Guglielmo da Bubbio (1254) on List of Knights Templar
