= Diego Bubbio =

Italian philosopher

Paolo Diego Bubbio
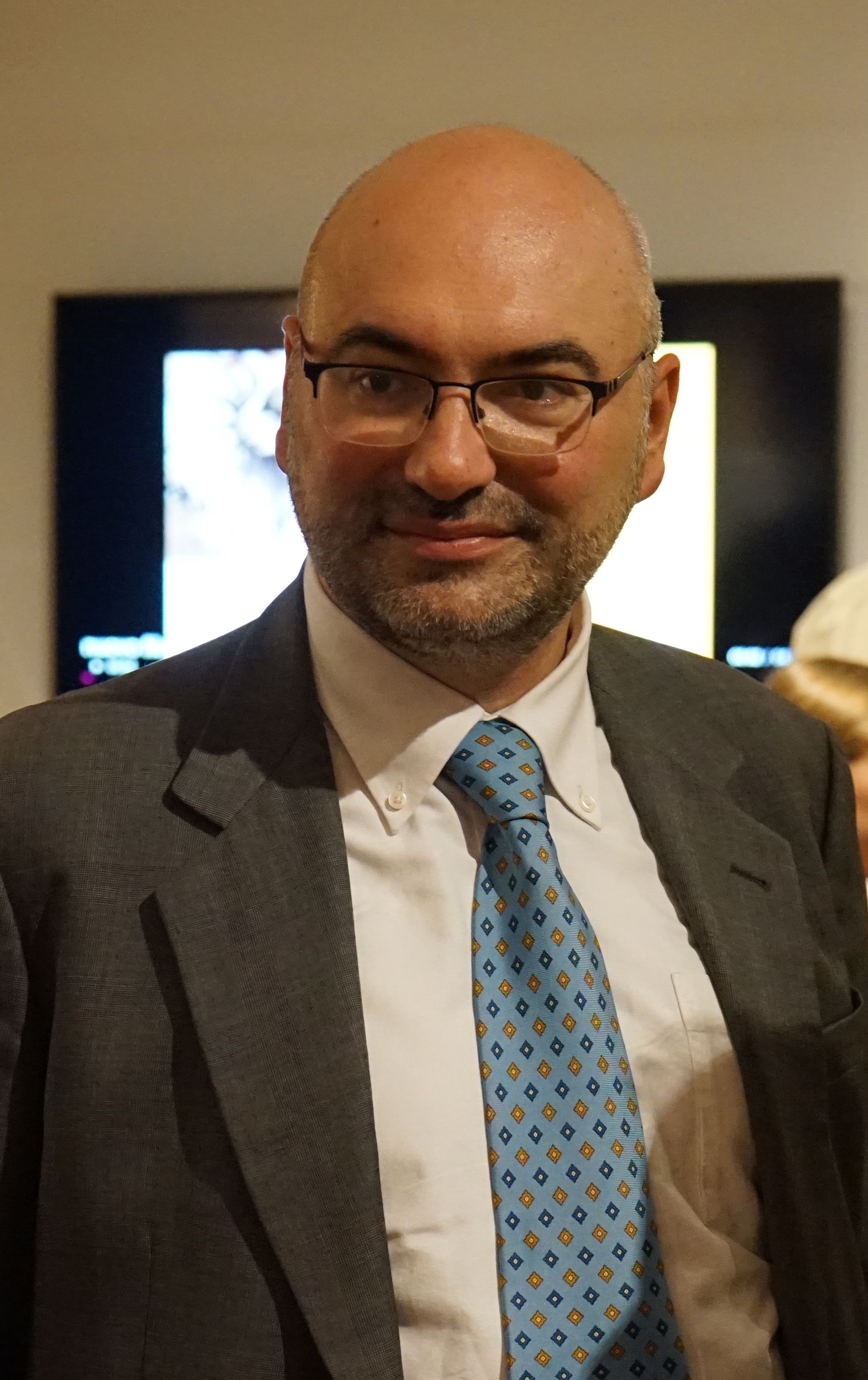
- Born: 18 May 1974 (age 52); Turin
- Awards: Australian Research Council Future Fellowship

Academic background
- Education: University of Turin (Ph.D.)
- Doctoral advisor: Marco Ravera
- Influences: Gianni Vattimo, René Girard, Luigi Pareyson

Academic work
- Era: 21st-century philosophy
- Region: Western philosophy
- School or tradition: Continental
- Main interests: Hermeneutics; Philosophy of religion German Idealism
- Website: https://westernsydney.academia.edu/PaoloDiegoBubbio

Paolo Diego Bubbio (born 1974) is an Italian philosopher and associate professor of Theoretical Philosophy at the University of Turin. He holds the Italian National Scientific Habilitation as a Full Professor. Bubbio is known for his proposal of “kenotic thought” and for his research on post-Kantian philosophy, philosophical hermeneutics, and the philosophy of religion (particularly the notion of sacrifice). He is the editor of the "Contemporary Studies in Idealism" book series for Lexington Books.

== Career ==
Bubbio was born in Turin, Piedmont. He studied philosophy at the University of Turin, where he attended the lectures of Gianni Vattimo and graduated with a Laurea Magistrale in 1997, with a thesis on René Girard and the philosophy of religion. He then obtained a doctorate in philosophical hermeneutics from the University of Turin in 2003, with a dissertation on the notion of sacrifice in contemporary philosophy. After completing his PhD, Bubbio worked as assegnista di ricerca (contract researcher) and as a professore a contratto (adjunct professor) at the University of Turin. In 2003/2004, he was a Research Fellow at Heythrop College (University of London), where he met René Girard, with whom he had a correspondence since 1997. In 2006, he moved to Australia, where he worked at The University of Sydney, first as University of Sydney Postdoctoral Fellow (2006–2009) and then as an Australian Postdoctoral Fellow on an ARC-funded research project (with Paul Redding) on “The God of Hegel’s Post-Kantian Idealism” (2009–2012). From 2009 to 2011, he co-directed (with Paul Redding) the “Religion and Post-Kantian Philosophy Research Cluster” at The University of Sydney. In 2011, Bubbio received an ARC Future Fellowship and joined Western Sydney University, first as a Senior Lecturer and later as an associate professor in philosophy. In 2022, he returned to Italy to assume the position of associate professor of Theoretical Philosophy at the University of Turin.

== Philosophy ==
=== Sacrifice and Perspectivism ===
Bubbio's philosophy can be characterized by his emphasis on “kenotic thought”, a multifaceted philosophical proposal that integrates themes of sacrifice, perspectivism, mediated objectivity, and ethical responsibility. According to Bubbio, a philosophical interpretation of the concept of kenosis involves the relinquishment of absolute standpoints in favour of a perspectival conception, advocating for mutual recognition in the pursuit of knowledge and ethical de-centering. Bubbio distinguishes between two different meanings of “sacrifice”: sacrifice as “suppression” or “investment” (to give something up in order to get something back in exchange), and sacrifice as “withdrawal” or “relinquishment” – the latter also referred to as “kenotic sacrifice”, as it is representatively modelled on Christ's act of renouncing his divine nature in the incarnation to become human.

In Sacrifice in the Post-Kantian Tradition: Perspectivism, Intersubjectivity, and Recognition, Bubbio argues that kenotic sacrifice is the driving force (both historical and theoretical) behind the tradition of perspectivism, which holds that no way of seeing the world can be taken as definitely true (distinct from relativism, which posits that all perspectives are equally valid). Bubbio analyses key thinkers in the Kantian and post-Kantian tradition (Kant, Solger, Hegel, Kierkegaard, and Nietzsche), and concludes that kenotic sacrifice involves the act of “withdrawing” and relinquishing the claim to absolute objectivity to “make room” for other points of view. This, he argues, paves the way for the overcoming of the metaphysical ideal of the “absolutely objective” point of view (or “God’s-eye view”). In this context, Hegel is regarded as playing a key role: Bubbio sees in Hegel's philosophy an accomplished form of perspectivism, one that avoids the problems associated with more “extreme” forms of perspectivism, such as Nietzsche's.

=== Hegel, God and the Self ===
Hegel's philosophy is the subject of Bubbio's 2017 book God and the Self in Hegel: Beyond Subjectivism.

God and the Self in Hegel received significant attention in the field of Hegel scholarship, reigniting a debate about the status of the idea of God in Hegel's philosophy. Some scholars welcomed Bubbio's move enthusiastically: Cyril O’Regan wrote that “God and the Self in Hegel makes essential contributions to the understanding of Hegel’s philosophical thought” covering topics such as Hegel's famous ‘death of God’ trope “extraordinarily well”, and Philip T. Grier called it “an impressive and also challenging examination of Hegel’s philosophy of religion”. Other scholars, while acknowledging the value of Bubbio's reconstruction, were more critical of its outcome, particularly its advocacy for the centrality of the idea of God in Hegel's philosophy.

=== Kenotic Thought and the Self: Hegel and Heidegger ===
In subsequent works, Bubbio has further elaborated on “kenotic thought” as a distinctive philosophical proposal. A dialogue between Bubbio and Vattimo reveals their alignment but also significant differences in their philosophical perspectives, particularly regarding their approaches to hermeneutics and metaphysics. Bubbio's approach emerges as more constructive compared to Vattimo's deconstructive tendencies, advocating a more stable framework where multiple perspectives coexist through conscious acts of self-limitation. While influenced by the hermeneutic tradition, Bubbio does not entirely reject metaphysical considerations, as his kenotic thought involves a mediated objectivity influenced by Hegelian idealism, where the self and other dynamically interact to shape reality. The Hegelian framework supports the kenotic approach by rejecting both subjectivist and objectivist extremes. Ethically, it involves a de-centering activity where individuals recognize and integrate the perspectives of others, thereby fostering mutual recognition and respect. Bubbio highlights the active aspect of the Hegelian notion of Entäußerung (externalization), arguing that the dialectic between interiorisation and externalisation enables the recollection and transformation of memories of struggles in the pursuit of justice.

In Hegel, Heidegger, and the Quest for the 'I': Prolegomena to a Philosophy of Self, Bubbio's philosophical proposal to move beyond traditional dichotomies and embrace a relational and intersubjective account of the self represents a further application of his kenotic thought. The central idea here is that true selfhood is achieved not through self-assertion or ego-centricity but through a process of self-emptying and openness to others and the world that is both transformative and relational. This concept aligned with his exploration of the self in the context of Hegel's and Heidegger's philosophies.

Bubbio argues that both Hegel and Heidegger sought to transcend the traditional dichotomies that have historically polarized Western philosophy, such as subjectivity versus objectivity, nature versus history, and truth versus freedom. Drawing from Hegel's and Heidegger's approaches, Bubbio ventures to chart his own course, using their philosophies to present the journey of the “I/self” that involves the transition from nature to history, a journey lived in experience and expressed in myth. His aim is to develop a non-dichotomizing account of the “I” that emphasizes the relational and intersubjective nature of the self. Part III of the books proposes such novel understanding of “I-hood” that transcends traditional subjectivist and objectivist interpretations. Bubbio challenges prevailing models of identity and agency, offering a relational and intersubjective account of the self to address the complexities of the contemporary world. His philosophical proposal calls for a reinterpretation of the self as fundamentally relational and intersubjective. In the conclusion, Bubbio delineates a unified theory of “I-hood” as a multifaceted, dynamic, and intersubjective process, irreducible to impersonal conceptions. He emphasizes the importance of self-awareness, the irreducibility of the self, and the interplay between subjective and objective dimensions of “I-hood”. Bubbio conceives of “I-hood” as inherently perspectival, shaped by interactions with the world and others, and deeply rooted in place and context. He also highlights the dynamic nature of “I-hood”, its interconnectedness with the external world, and its collective and multiple identity. In the context of environmental ethics, Bubbio's kenotic thought proposes a shift from an exploitative approach to one that is relational and inclusive, advocating for ethical self-limitation in our interactions with the natural world. This involves a conscious recognition and integration of the perspectives of non-human others, acknowledging that our understanding of the environment is always mediated by our interactions with it. This means that the human self and the natural world are not separate and opposing entities but are dynamically interrelated. Such a perspective fosters a sense of ethical responsibility towards the environment, where the recognition of the interconnectedness of all life forms leads to more sustainable and respectful practices.

=== Mimetic theory ===
Bubbio has also written extensively on Rene Girard's mimetic theory. His book Intellectual Sacrifice and Other Mimetic Paradoxes collects his most significant writings on the topic, and is presented as Bubbio's intellectual journey over two decades (from 1999 to 2019) through mimetic theory. The first part is a revised translation of a short book originally published in Italian in 1999: the central thesis here is that philosophy and religion can be regarded as subjects involved in a mimetic rivalry on the intellectual level. In the chapters of the second part of the book, Bubbio addresses several topics developing the dialogue between Girard's mimetic theory and the Post-Kantian philosophical tradition, and in particular contemporary philosophical hermeneutics. In the final chapter, Bubbio advocates for the need of developing mimetic theory into Hermeneutic Mimetic Theory (or HMT). According to Bubbio, HMT can solve some of the internal problems of mimetic theory in its original version, and at the same time it can offer a meaningful contribution to the development of a new paradigm of the “I”.

== Bibliography ==
- Bubbio, Paolo Diego (2018). Hegel, Heidegger, and the Quest for the "I": Prolegomena to a Philosophy of the Self. Routledge. ISBN 9781032417417.
- Bubbio, Paolo Diego (2018). Intellectual Sacrifice and Other Mimetic Paradoxes. Michigan State University. ISBN 9781611862737.
- Bubbio, Paolo Diego (2017). God and the Self in Hegel: Beyond Subjectivism. SUNY Press. ISBN 978-1-4384-6525-8.
- Bubbio, Paolo Diego (2014). Sacrifice in the Post-Kantian Tradition: Perspectivism, Intersubjectivity, and Recognition. SUNY Press. ISBN 978-1-4384-5251-7.
- Bubbio, D. and Redding, P. (2012), Religion After Kant. God and Culture in the Idealist Era, Cambridge Scholars Publishing ISBN 9781443835183.
- Bubbio, D. and Quadrio, P. (2011), The Relationship of Philosophy to Religion Today, Cambridge Scholars Publishing ISBN 9781443826648
- Luigi Pareyson, Existence, Interpretation, Freedom (Selected Writings), Edited (with introduction) by Diego Bubbio, Davies Group Publishers, 2009
- Bubbio, D. (2004), Il Sacrificio. La Ragione e il suo Altrove [Sacrifice. Reason and its Other], Citta Nuova 8831101404
- Bubbio, P. (1999), Il Sacrificio Intellettuale: Rene Girard e la Filosofia della Religione, Il Quadrante Edizioni

== See also ==
- Italian philosophy
