= Waldemar Chrostowski =

Polish Catholic priest and professor (born 1951)

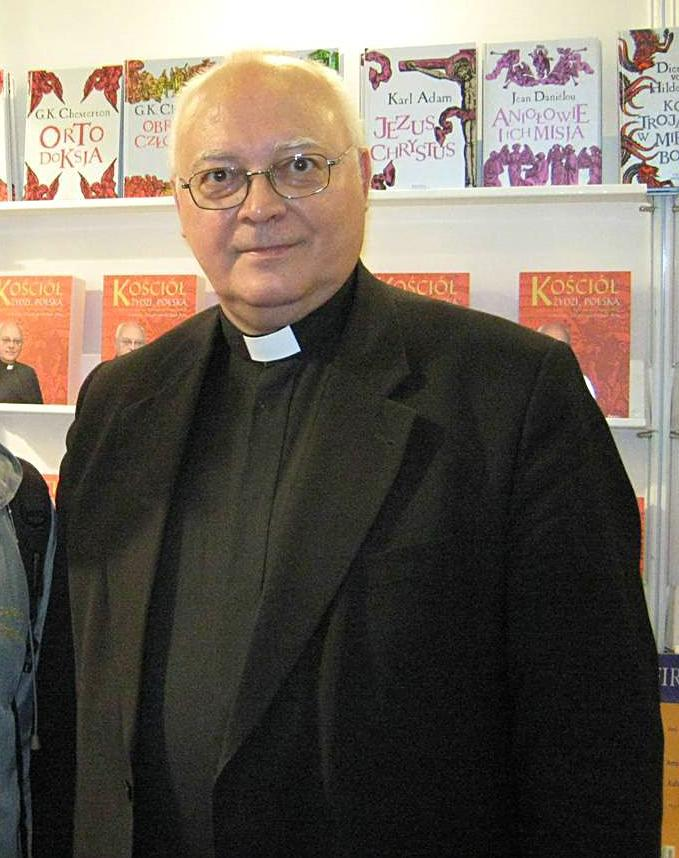
Waldemar Chrostowski

Monsignor Waldemar Chrostowski (b. 1 February 1951 in Chrostowo) is a Polish Catholic priest, Bible scholar, and theologian. He is a professor of theology at the Cardinal Stefan Wyszynski University in Warsaw.

== Early life and education ==
Chrostowski was born in 1951 at an eponymous village; he was educated at the Pontifical Biblical Institute (1978–1983) and spent a year (1979–1980) at the Hebrew University of Jerusalem. In 1986, Chrostowski received his Ph.D. on the interpretation of certain Biblical verses concerning Israel.

== Career ==
In 1987, Chrostowski received appointment at the Academy of Catholic Theology. Nine years later, in 1996, he obtained habiliation in Biblical studies. In 1998, Chrostowski joined the Theological College in Warsaw as an associate professor and Chair of Old Testament exegesis. At the same time, from 1999 till 2002, he served as the Vice-Rector of the Cardinal Stefan Wyszyński University. In 2003, he was promoted to full professorship.

Until 1998, he was the founding-chairman of the Polish Council of Christians and Jews.

== Views and reception ==
In October 1997, Henryk Jankowski, a renowned priest-cum-politician claimed that it was undesirable to have a Jewish minority in the Polish government since the nation was "afraid of it". His remarks drew international attention; Stanisław Musiał, a member of the Committee on Christian-Jewish dialogue, characterized them as Hitlerian-antisemitic and lamented the lack of dissent in Polish society, including from the clergy and politicians. Musial's arguments invited a polemic from Chrostowski, a co-Chair of the Committee, who distanced himself from Jankowski's statement but accused Musial of misrepresenting it, engaging in hyperbole and demagoguery, and not delineating between anti-semitism and anti-Jewishness. Chrostowski's article engendered a controversy with Polish Jews and in a rejoinder, Musial noted that some of Chrostowski's arguments were antisemitic in themselves among other flaws. Further, Musial's stance drew support from Stanislaw Krajewski, the co-chair, spurring Chrostowski to resign.

Since then, Chrostowski has been vocal about "Jewish anti-Polonism" and has denounced, what he finds to be the Judaization of the Auschwitz. He has argued that charges of anti-semitism has been weaponized to suppress discussions of anti-Christian sentiments among Jews. He has supported the ahistorical notion of Żydokomuna — a notorious antisemitic trope —, and has claimed that the Holocaust was organized in Poland to destroy the good name of Poles than persecute Jews. Chrostowski has been a critic of Jan T. Gross's historiography — arguing his works to have no relation with "truth" — and opposed to idea that the Poles needed to apologize to the Jews for the Jedwabne pogrom.

Chrostowski has denied the existence of LGBT community, and suggested that pride marches are ideological tools of a cultural revolution. Speaking at the Holy Mass, he has drawn parallels between women's protests against abortion bans to Bolshevic revolutions, arguing that the participants promoted "promiscuity" and "distorted the vision of man" to create a new world order, where "good women" would suffer the most.

== Honors ==
In 2014, Chrostowski was conferred with the Ratzinger Prize.
