= Sacrifice in the Post-Kantian Tradition =

2014 book by Diego Bubbio

- Cover
- Author: Diego Bubbio
- Language: English
- Subject: Sacrifice
- Publisher: SUNY Press
- Publication date: 2014
- Publication place: United States
- Media type: Print
- Pages: 226 pp.
- ISBN: 978-1-4384-5252-4

Sacrifice in the Post-Kantian Tradition: Perspectivism, Intersubjectivity, and Recognition is a 2014 book about sacrifice by the philosopher Paolo Diego Bubbio, in which the author provides a historical and theoretical analysis of the development of the concept of sacrifice through the works of Kant, Karl Solger, Hegel, Kierkegaard, and Nietzsche.

== Summary ==
Bubbio's main thesis is that there is a strong interrelation between the kenotic conception of sacrifice and the tradition of Kantian and post-Kantian idealism. In other words, this conception of sacrifice can be seen in the works of most of the thinkers of the post-Kantian tradition.

Bubbio argues that the very possibility of a “realm of reason” made up by values and norms depends on the recognition of “the other” as another human being. Particularly he emphasizes the reciprocal connection of the Hegel's recognition-theoretic approach and his emphasis on kenotic sacrifice, both of which are evidence of his belonging to perspectivism. Bubbio takes this kind of perspectivism as a fundamental feature of the post-Kantian tradition.

== Reception ==
Sacrifice in the Post-Kantian Tradition was reviewed by the philosophers Gianni Vattimo, Chris Fleming, Mark Alznauer, and Patrick Stokes.

Vattimo writes: "… Bubbio’s book is an important philosophical work: not only as an excellent analysis of sacrifice in the post-Kantian tradition but also—and perhaps especially—because it confronts what is more alive in contemporary philosophy in a clear and productive way." Fleming writes: "Bubbio’s particular talent is for re-excavating the history of Western philosophy and asking us to see anew things that we have read before."
