= Scott J. Hafemann =

American Biblical Scholar

Scott Jack Hafemann (born 1954) is an American New Testament scholar. He has been Reader at St Mary's College, University of St Andrews since 2011.

Hafemann studied at Bethel College, Fuller Theological Seminary, and the University of Tübingen. He taught at Taylor University and Gordon–Conwell Theological Seminary before his appointment as the inaugural Gerald F. Hawthorne Professor of New Testament Greek and Exegesis at Wheaton College in 1995. In 2004, he became the Mary F. Rockefeller Distinguished Professor of New Testament at Gordon–Conwell, a position he held until 2011.

In 2017, a Festschrift was published in his honor, called The Crucified Apostle: Essays on Paul and Peter. It included contributions from Paul R. House and Peter Stuhlmacher.
