= Luigi Pareyson =

Italian philosopher (1918–1991)

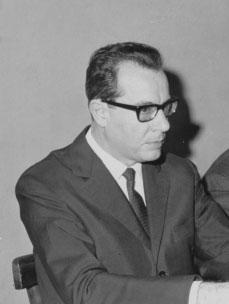
Luigi Pareyson (1968)

Luigi Pareyson (Italian: [pareiˈzɔn]; 4 February 1918 – 8 September 1991) was an Italian philosopher, best known for challenging the positivist and idealist aesthetics of Benedetto Croce in his 1954 monograph Estetica. Teoria della formatività (Aesthetics. A Theory of Formativity).

== Biography ==
Luigi Pareyson was born on 4 February 1918, in Piasco, in the province of Cuneo. He received his laurea from the University of Turin in 1939, finishing his degree with a dissertation entitled "Karl Jaspers and the Philosophy of Existence". As a professor at the University of Turin, he had many famous students, including Mario Perniola, Gianni Vattimo, Umberto Eco, and Valerio Verra, who studied with Hans-Georg Gadamer in Germany and diffused his thought in Italy.

In 1971, Pareyson published Verità ed interpretazione (Truth and interpretation), his fundamental text, which, two years later, was followed by Verra's monography Ontologia e ermeneutica in Germania (Ontology and hermeneutics in Germany). Preceded by the Italian jurist Emilio Betti, the work of Pareyson spread hermeneutics out of the juridical studies in which it had been limited until then. Pareyson gave birth to the Italian hermeneutic school of thought, a school that dominated the Italian philosophical gamut until the 1990s. His thought intersected with the approval of Gianni Vattimo and Sergio Givone, followed by Carlo Sini, Vincenzo Vitiello, Carlo Bianco and Mario Ruggenini.

Pareyson died in Milan on 8 September 1991.

== Philosophy ==
Pareyson was considered among the leading Italian philosophers of the 20th century. Together with Nicola Abbagnano, he was among the first to make German existentialism (especially Heidegger and Jaspers) known in Italy. Pareyson, who worked within a framework dominated by neo-idealism, identified himself with this style of doing philosophy. He also proposed a new interpretation of German idealism that did not focus on Hegel as its main interpretive key (Fichte, 1950), but instead focused on Friedrich Schelling as the precursor to whom existentialism owed its ascendancy. In this regard, he argued that “the authentic existentialists, the only ones truly worthy of the name, Heidegger, Jaspers and Marcel, have either referred back to Schelling or intended to come to terms with him.”

For Pareyson, German existentialism had to be taken up in a hermeneutic key: he considered truth not an objective datum, as it is in science, but as an interpretation of the individual, which requires subjective responsibility. He called his position “ontological personalism.”

In his historiographical research, Pareyson identifies two currents in post-Hegelian German philosophy, which could be traced back to Søren Kierkegaard and Ludwig Feuerbach, respectively, and which would result in existentialism and Marxism, respectively.

Many of Luigi Pareyson's philosophical works focus on the problem of evil and suffering.

Pareyson's emphasis on the reception of Schelling's late philosophy and his use of it in his own ontology of freedom led Xavier Tilliette to describe Pareyson as «Schelling redivivus».

== Works ==
- La filosofia dell'esistenza e Karl Jaspers, Napoli: Loffredo, 1940 (new ed. Karl Jaspers, Casale M.: Marietti, 1983)
- Studi sull'esistenzialismo, Firenze: Sansoni, 1943
- Esistenza e persona, Torino: Taylor, 1950 (IV ed. Genova: Il Melangolo, 1985)
- L'estetica dell'idealismo tedesco, Torino: Edizioni di «Filosofia», 1950
- Fichte, Torino: Edizioni di «Filosofia», 1950 (new ed. Fichte. Il sistema della libertà, Milano: Mursia, 1976)
- Estetica. Teoria della formatività, Torino: Edizioni di «Filosofia», 1954 (new ed. Milano: Bompiani 1988)
- Teoria dell'arte, Milano: Marzorati, 1965
- I problemi dell'estetica, Milano: Marzorati, 1966
- Conversazioni di estetica, Milano: Mursia, 1966
- Il pensiero etico di Dostoevskij, Torino: Einaudi, 1967
- Verità e interpretazione, Milano: Mursia, 1971
- L'esperienza artistica, Milano: Marzorati, 1974
- Federico Guglielmo Schelling, in Grande antologia filosofica, vol. XVIII, Milano: Marzorati, 1971, pp. 1–340
- Dostoevskij: filosofia, romanzo ed esperienza religiosa, 1976; Torino: Einaudi, 1993
- La filosofia e il problema del male, "Annuario filosofico" 2 (1986), pp. 7–69
- Filosofia dell'interpretazione, Torino: Rosenberg & Sellier, 1988
- Filosofia della libertà, Genova: Il Melangolo, 1989
- Ontologia della libertà. Il male e la sofferenza, Torino: Einaudi, 1995 (posthumous).
- Existence, Interpretation, Freedom: Selected Writings, Aurora (CO): Davies Group, 2009 (selected writings edited with an introduction and notes by Paolo Diego Bubbio).
- Andrea Bellocci, Implicanza degli opposti, aporia dell'identico. Luigi Pareyson interprete di Karl Barth (prefazione di Gennaro Sasso), Lithos, Roma 2012
