= Christian Schaller =

German Roman Catholic theologian

Christian Schaller (born 1967) is a German Roman Catholic theologian from Munich. In June 2013, he was co-recipient, with Richard A. Burridge, of the Ratzinger Prize.

== Life ==
Schaller was born in Munich in 1967. He studied at the faculty of theology of LMU Munich. Already during his diploma thesis (Diplomarbeit), he dealt with one aspect of the theology of Joseph Ratzinger, soon to be Benedict XVI: The Eucharistic Ecclesiology in the context of the sacramentality of the Church was the title of the paper presented by Gerhard Ludwig Müller.

From 1997 to 2000, he was a research associate professor of systematic theology for future secondary school teachers at LMU Munich and the Research Project known as Religion: the history a fundamental concept in modern Christianity from Antiquity up to the twentieth century.

During his period as a research assistant of the chair of dogmatic theology (2000–2003) at LMU Munich, he produced his doctoral thesis showing that, compared to the nineteenth century, which ecclesiological developments led to an intense aggiornamento of the Church in the Second Vatican Council and were included in the Constitution on the Church Lumen gentium. In the foreground is an analysis of the concept "sacramentality of the Church" in the New Testament and its coordinates in the history of theology as well as its systematic exposure to the nineteenth and twentieth centuries.

From 2003 to 2012, Schaller was the theological collaborator of Gerhard Ludwig Müller, Bishop of Regensburg, and at the same time, since 2008, Deputy Director (vicar) of the Institut Papst Benedikt XVI, which is responsible for the edition of the publication complete works of Joseph Ratzinger, the establishment of a specialized library and an archive for scientific research work of the theological Papa Emeritus.

== Publications ==
Among the publications of Schaller are his contributions Catholicity not lost, Joseph Ratzinger and the Orthodox Churches and – as co-editor – the Ratzinger-Studien (since 2008) and the communications Mitteilingen. Institut Papst Benedikt XVI. (since 2008). The main topics of the work of Schaller are Christology and ecclesiology.

- Schaller, Christian (2003). Organum salutis : die Sakramentalität der Kirche im ekklesiologischen Entwurf des Würzburger Apologeten Franz Seraph Hettinger : ein Beitrag zur Ekklesiologie des 19. Jahrhunderts (in German). St. Ottilien: EOS. ISBN 3-8306-7164-4. OCLC 52430693.
- Schaller, Christian (2003). Papst Pius IX. begegnen (in German). Augsburg. ISBN 3-929246-96-1. OCLC 76467975.
- Müller, Gerhard Ludwig; Schaller, Christian; Schulz, Michael; Voderholzer, Rudolf (2008). Mittler und Befreier : die christologische Dimension der Theologie : für Gerhard Ludwig Müller (in German). Freiburg im Breisgau: Herder. ISBN 978-3-451-29804-2. OCLC 191658575.
- Schaller, Christian (2011). Kirche - Sakrament und Gemeinschaft zu Ekklesiologie und Ökumene bei Joseph Ratzinger (in German). Regensburg. ISBN 978-3-7917-2394-5. OCLC 756381429.
- Schaller, Christian; Benedikt XVI. Papst; Verlag Schnell & Steiner (2017). Brich mir das Brot des Wortes Festgabe für Papst em. Benedikt XVI. zum 90. Geburtstag (in German). Regensburg. ISBN 978-3-7954-3248-5. OCLC 983788180.
- Schaller, Christian; Schuller, Florian; Zöhrer, Josef; Verlag Friedrich Pustet (2018). Europa christlich?! zum Gespräch von Glaube und säkularer Welt (in German). Regensburg. ISBN 978-3-7917-2388-4. OCLC 1031052239.
