= Christopher Yeomans =

American philosophy professor

Academic background
- Education: University of California, Riverside (PhD)
- Thesis: Hegel's logic of agency: A transcendental defense of free will (2005)
- Doctoral advisor: Pierre Keller
- Other advisor: Gary L. Watson

Academic work
- Era: Contemporary philosophy
- Region: Western philosophy
- School or tradition: German Idealism
- Institutions: Purdue University

Christopher Yeomans is a professor of philosophy at Purdue University.

== Life and works ==
Yeomans earned a Ph.D. in Philosophy from the University of California, Riverside in 2005. Prior to that, they completed an M.A. in Philosophy at San Diego State University in 2000 and an A.B. in linguistics from the University of California, Berkeley in 1993.

=== Selected publications ===
==== Monographs ====
- Yeomans, Christopher (2023-06-17). The Politics of German Idealism (1 ed.). New York: Oxford University Press. doi:10.1093/oso/9780197667309.001.0001. ISBN 978-0-19-766730-9.
- Yeomans, Christopher (2015-02-02). The Expansion of Autonomy: Hegel's Pluralistic Philosophy of Action. Oxford University Press. doi:10.1093/acprof:oso/9780199394548.001.0001. ISBN 978-0-19-939454-8.
- Yeomans, Christopher (2011-12-14). Freedom and Reflection: Hegel and the Logic of Agency. Oxford University Press. doi:10.1093/acprof:oso/9780199794522.001.0001. ISBN 978-0-19-979452-2.

==== Editorials ====
- Lyssy, Ansgar; Yeomans, Christopher, eds. (2021). Kant on Morality, Humanity, and Legality. doi:10.1007/978-3-030-54050-0. ISBN 978-3-030-54049-4.
