= Etsuro Sotoo =

Japanese sculptor (born 1953)

- 外尾悦郎
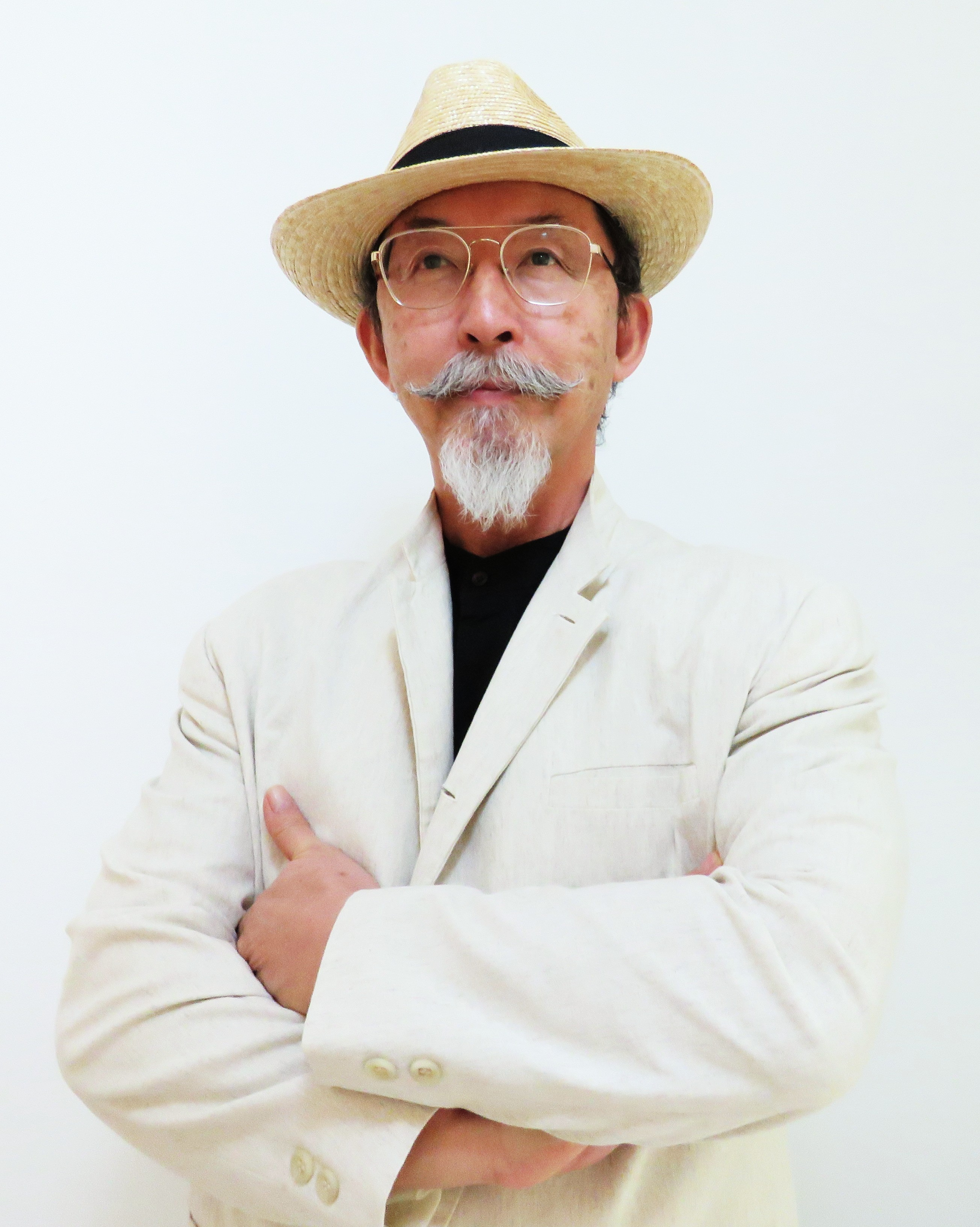
- Sotoo in 2020
- Born: Etsurō Sotoo; 1953 (age 72–73); Fukuoka Prefecture, Japan
- Education: Kyoto University (BA)
- Known for: Sagrada Família sculptures
- Movement: Modernisme
- Awards: Ratzinger Prize (2024); International Gold Medal Award for Merit in Catholic Culture (2011)

Etsurō Sotoo (Japanese: 外尾悦郎; born 1953) is a Japanese sculptor strongly influenced by Antoni Gaudí. His interest in Gaudí led him to convert to Catholicism. His most noted work are sculptures located in the Sagrada Família in Barcelona. He is nicknamed the "Japanese Gaudí" in his native Japan.

== Biography ==
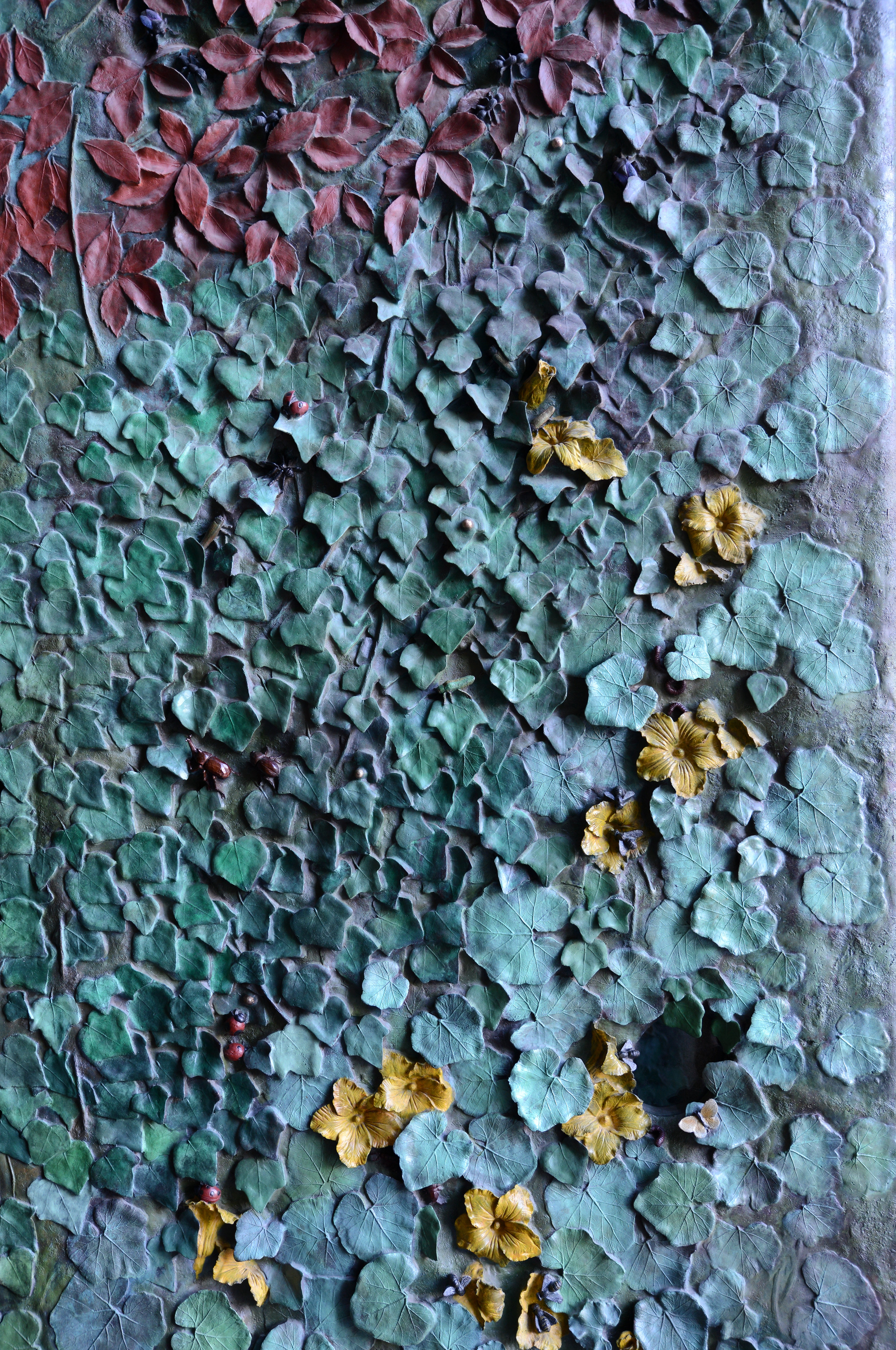
Close-up floral details of the Portal of Charity at the Nativity Façade of the Sagrada Família, by Etsuro Sotoo

Sotoo was born in Fukuoka Prefecture in 1953. He visited Barcelona in 1978 and was impressed by the Sagrada Família. He worked as a stonecutter and has been working since then on sculptures for the building, following the instructions left by Antoni Gaudí. At first he worked on the Nativity Façade. Among other figures there were sculptures of angels, musicians and singers, children, as well as the fruit baskets crowning the pinnacles of the temple.

He has also designed the doors installed on the Nativity Façade (inaugurated in December 2015 after many years of work), made of bronze and glass, decorated with plants, insects and small animals. He has made four gargoyles to be installed in the towers of the Evangelists, currently under construction. In addition, Sotoo was commissioned to restore the sculptures of the Porta del Rosari, damaged in the Spanish Civil War. He also worked on the design of tubular bells installed in Gaudí thought bell towers of the three facades of the Sagrada Família.

He is also author of a monument commemorating the 150th anniversary of the signature Louis Vuitton in Barberà del Vallès (2004) and Memorial Angel Lace (2003) in Arenys de Munt and sculpture of Josemaria Escriva de Balaguer (2004) in the Montalegre church for Barcelona.

In Japan, author of Birth (1985) and The Old Man and the Girl (1988) in the Art Museum Chohachi Matsuzaki and sculptures Pineapples (1993) at the Stadium of Fukuoka and Five Elements (1997) at the Institute of Fukuoka monument of 1500 m^{2} dedicated to water, the wind, the sky, fire and earth. Sotoo was a visiting professor of Kyushu University User Science Institute, School of Engineering Main Building and ambassador of Kesennuma, Rias Sanriku (Japan). He was also vice president of the Nipon Center of Canet de Mar.

At the age of 37, Sotoo converted to Catholicism in honor of his admiration and study of Gaudí's work, baptizing himself with the name Luca Michelangelo (Catalan: Luca Miquel Àngel). In 2015, he created the pulpit of Cattedrale di Santa Maria del Fiore in Florence, Tuscany, Italy. Sotoo was awarded the Ratzinger Prize in 2024, alongside Irish theologian Cyril O'Regan.

== Works cited ==
- Sotoo, Etsuro (15 November 2010). La Libertad Vertical: Conversaciones Sobre La Sagrada Família [Vertical Freedom: Conversations on the Sagrada Família] (in Spanish). Ediciones Encuentro, S.A. ISBN 978-84-9920-062-0.
- van Hensbergen, Gijs (18 May 2017). The Sagrada Familia: Gaudí's Heaven on Earth. Bloomsbury Publishing. ISBN 978-84-01-34713-9.
