= Allen Speight =

- Born: 1962 (age 63–64)

Academic background
- Education: University of Chicago (PhD)
- Thesis: Agency and tragedy in Hegel's philosophy of action (1993)
- Doctoral advisor: Robert B. Pippin
- Other advisors: Paul Ricoeur, Leszek Kołakowski, Steven B. Smith, David Grene, Leon Kass, Otto Pöggeler, Ludwig Siep, Christoph Jamme

Academic work
- Era: Contemporary philosophy
- Region: Western philosophy
- School or tradition: German Idealism
- Institutions: University of Boston
- Website: https://www.bu.edu/philo/profile/c-allen-speight/

Charles Allen Speight (May 24, 1962) is a professor of philosophy and former chair of Department of Philosophy at Boston University.

== Life and work ==
Speight began his academic life at St. John’s College in Maryland studying journalism with an interest in political coverage. He received his doctorate at the University of Chicago, where he completed his dissertation on Georg Hegel, Agency and tragedy in Hegel's philosophy of action, in 1993. Before coming to Boston University, He taught at St. Xavier University and the University of Chicago.

In the book Hegel, Literature, and the Problem of Agency, he argues that Hegel's treatment of three literary genres, tragedy, comedy, and the Romantic novel (through the works of Sophocles, Diderot, Schlegel and Jacobi) actually trace three moments of human agency: retrospectivity, theatricality and forgiveness. Therefore, Hegel's philosophical project The Phenomenology of Spirit is actually understanding the issue of human agency in the modern world. The book has been the subject of a number of reviews by Martin Donougho, Terry Pinkard, Andreas Großmann, Michael Baur, and Simon Lumsden.

=== Selected publications ===
- Speight, Allen (2001). Hegel, Literature, and the Problem of Agency. doi:10.1017/CBO9780511612831. ISBN 978-0-521-79184-7.
- Speight, Allen (2008). The Philosophy of Hegel. McGill-Queen's University Press. ISBN 978-0-7735-3407-0. JSTOR j.ctt7zt3cj.

==== Translations ====
- Hegel, Georg Wilhelm Fredrich (2009). Bowman, Brady; Speight, Allen (eds.). Georg Wilhelm Friedrich Hegel: Heidelberg Writings. doi:10.1017/CBO9780511596858. ISBN 978-0-521-83300-4.

== Honors and awards ==
- 2012: Fulbright Professor at Leuphana Universität of Lüneburg
- 2002: Berlin Prize Fellow of the American Academy in Berlin
- 1990: Fellow of the German Academic Exchange Service (DAAD)
- 1991-1992: Fulbright Scholar at the Hegel Archive of the Ruhr-Universität Bochum
