= Anne-Marie Pelletier =

Catholic biblical scholar

Anne-Marie Pelletier (born 1946) is a noted Catholic biblical scholar whose works include study of the Song of Songs.

== Life ==
Pelletier was born in Paris on 13 June 1946. She lives in France. She was one of the two to receive the 2014 Ratzinger Prize and became the first woman to win the prize.

She was asked by Pope Francis to compose the Holy See's 2017 Vatican Way of the Cross meditations.
