= Manlio Simonetti =

Manlio Simonetti (2 May 1926 – 1 November 2017) was an Italian scholar of Patristics and the history of Biblical interpretation.

== Biography ==
Simonetti was born in Rome on 2 May 1926.

His early studies were in Classics (philology and history) at the Sapienza University of Rome. In 1959 he became Professor of Ancient Christian Literature at the University of Cagliari, a post he held until 1969. In that year he became Professor of the History of Christianity at the Sapienza, a chair he held for three decades. He also taught at the Salesian Pontifical University and was an instructor at the Augustinianum from its founding in 1971 until 2016. He was made a national fellow of the Accademia dei Lincei in 1981.

Simonetti died on 1 November 2017 in Rome, at the age of 91.

== Awards and publications ==
In 2011, he was a co-recipient of the first Ratzinger Prize. At the time of his award, Pope Benedict XVI remarked of him, "Professor Simonetti has approached the world of the Fathers in a new way, showing us with accuracy and care, what the Fathers say from the historical viewpoint; they become our contemporaries who speak to us".

Simonetti's academic publications are numerous. His scholarship was focused on the domains of Biblical interpretation (in particular, Job, the Gospel of Matthew, etc.), in Christian antiquity (e.g. Origen), Christology, notably during the Arian crisis of the fourth century), and early Christian literature (including anthologies).

Several of his most recent articles have appeared in Vetera Christianorum, and have been highlights of most issues since 2000. This journal is published at Edipuglia for the Classics and Christianity Department of the University of Bari.

== Selected works ==
- La crisi ariana nel IV secolo, Studia ephemeridis "Augustinianum" (in Italian), Rome: Institutum Patristicum Augustinianum, 1975
- Biblical interpretation in the early church: an historical introduction to patristic exegesis, Edinburgh: T&T Clark, 1994, ISBN 0567095576
- "Le scienze patristiche oggi. Questioni fondamentali di contenuto e di metodo", Vetera Christianorum (in Italian), 1, Bari: Edipuglia: 5–15, 2009
