= Pablo Blanco Sarto =

Spanish theologian

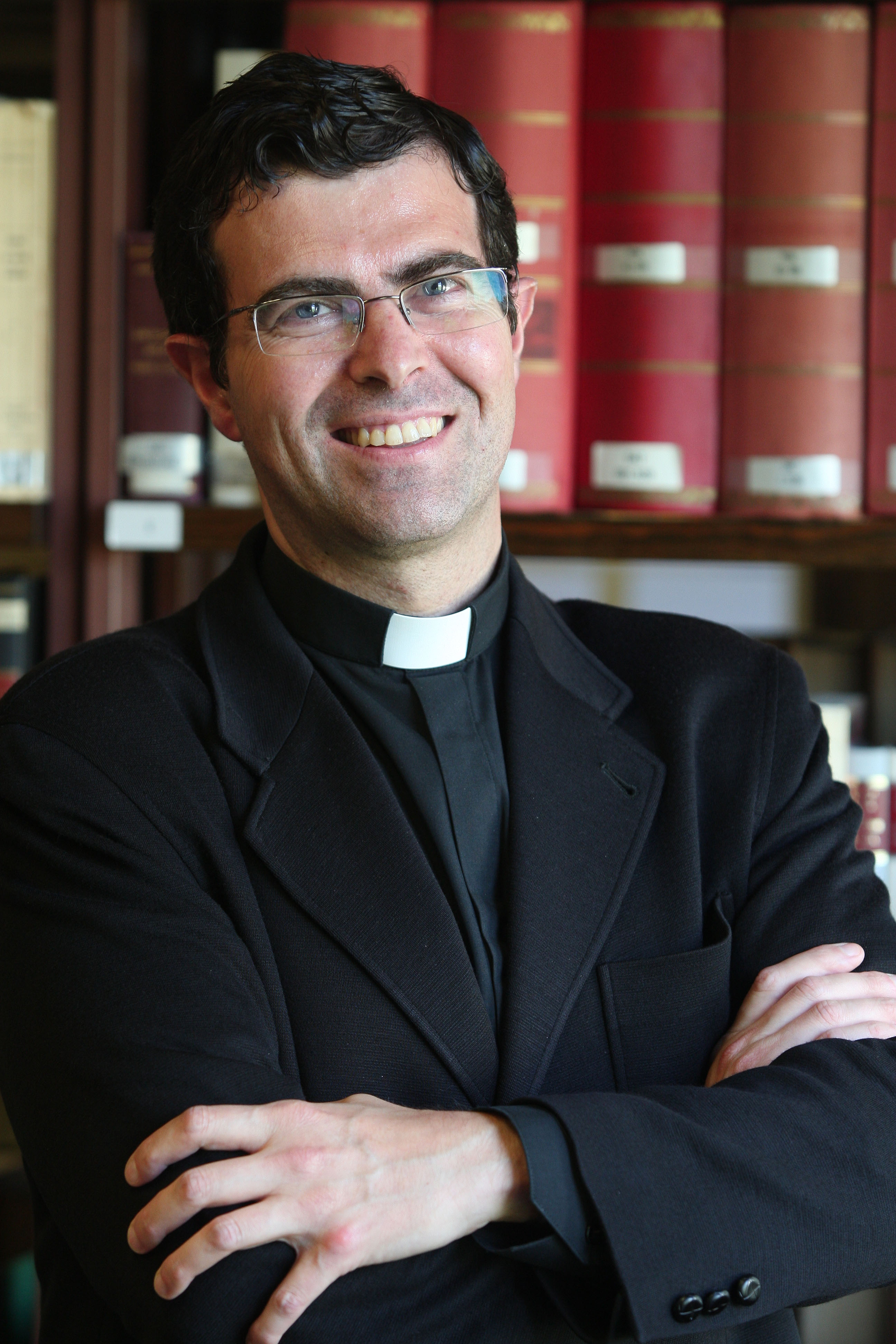
Pablo Blanco (2010)

Pablo Blanco Sarto (born 1964 in Zaragoza) is a Spanish priest, theologian and author. A professor at the University of Navarra. He has worked on aesthetics and hermeneutics of art, the relationship between faith and reason, ecumenism, and sacraments. He has been a member since 2012 of the editorial committee of the complete works of Joseph Ratzinger in Spanish in the Biblioteca de Autores Cristianos and, since 2015, of the group of research evaluators of the Pontificia Universidad Católica del Perú. In 2023 he was awarded the Ratzinger Prize.

== Education ==
Blanco Sarto studied Hispanic Philology at the University of Navarra, followed by theology at the Pontifical University of the Holy Cross in Rome before completing his licentiate and doctorate in philosophy. He completed his PhD at the University of Navarra in 2005, focusing on the theology of Joseph Ratzinger.
