= Xavier Tilliette =

French philosopher and historian

The Reverend Xavier Tilliette
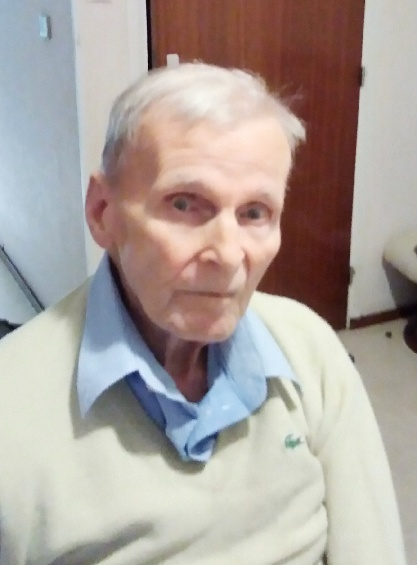
- Xavier Tilliette in 2017
- Born: 23 July 1921; Corbie, Third French Republic
- Died: 10 December 2018 (aged 97); Paris, France
- Occupations: Philosopher; Historian of philosophy Theologian; Catholic priest

Xavier Tilliette (23 July 1921 – 10 December 2018) was a French philosopher, historian of philosophy, theologian, and Jesuit Catholic priest. A former student of Jean Wahl and of Vladimir Jankélévitch, he was a member of the Society of Jesus (1938) and professor emeritus at the Catholic Institute of Paris (1969), having taught also at the Pontifical Gregorian University of Rome (1972), the Lateran University, and the Centre Sèvres in Paris.

== Biography ==
Xavier Tilliette also taught philosophy at various universities as a "visiting professor" in France and abroad: Lima, Santiago, Berlin, Bremen, Fribourg, Heidelberg, Hamburg, Munich, Bonn, Tübingen, Turin, Ferrara, Urbino, Rome, Macerata, Naples, Palermo. He spoke fluent English, Italian, German and Spanish, in addition to Latin, Greek and Hebrew, and he read Portuguese and Danish.

A specialist in Schelling and Jaspers, he has been developing since the 1970s a "philosophical Christology" which he initiated. In the tradition of Schelling and of Maurice Blondel, he defended and illustrated the idea of a Christian philosophy born from Revelation. He was also a specialist of Claudel, of phenomenology (Edmund Husserl and Maurice Merleau-Ponty), and of German idealism.

Xavier Tilliette was twice winner of a prize from the French Academy. Several of his works were translated into English, Italian, German, and Spanish.

Among his teachers, disciples, or friends, along with Wahl and Jankélévitch, were Hans Urs von Balthasar, Karl Rahner, Henri de Lubac, Gaston Fessard, Hans Georg Gadamer, Jürgen Habermas, Maurice Merleau-Ponty, Jean-Paul Sartre, Louis Bouyer, Jean Daniélou, Emmanuel Levinas, Paul Ricœur, Gabriel Marcel, Ambroise-Marie Carré, Yves Congar, Michel de Certeau, Stanislas Fumet, Maurice de Gandillac, Paul Doncœur, Pierre Blet, Marcel Brion, Robert Bresson, Enrico Castelli, Luigi Pareyson, Giuseppe Riconda, Michel Henry, Claude Bruaire, Jean Greisch, François Varillon, Albert Vanhoye, Jean-Luc Marion, Jean-Louis Vieillard-Baron, Francesco Tomatis.

He was a member of the Istituto Italiano per gli Studi Filosofici and of the Bavarian Academy of Sciences and Humanities (Bayerische Akademie der Wissenschaften of Munich), the Centro studi filosofico-religiosi Luigi Pareyson, and, since 2006, a corresponding member Accademia di estetica internazionale de Rapallo.

Xavier Tilliette was knight of the Légion d'honneur and of the Order of Merit of the Italian Republic. Tilliette died in Paris on 10 December 2018 at the age of 97.

== Selected bibliography ==
Xavier Tilliette wrote more than 2,000 essays, books, or articles; his more comprehensive bibliography contains over 250 pages.

Books in French

- 1960 Karl Jaspers, Aubier, coll. « Théologie »
- 1962 Existence et Littérature, Desclée de Brouwer
- 1962 Philosophes contemporains, Gabriel Marcel, Maurice Merleau-Ponty, Karl Jaspers, Desclée de Brouwer
- 1964 Jules Lequier ou le tourment de la liberté, Desclée de Brouwer
- 1970 Maurice Merleau-Ponty ou la mesure de l'homme, Seghers
- 1970 Schelling. Une philosophie en devenir, t. I, Le Système vivant, 1794–1821, t. II, La Dernière Philosophie, 1821–1854, Vrin, rééd. 1992
- 1974–1977 Le Christ des philosophes, 3 fascicules, ICP
- 1978 Schelling. Textes esthétiques. Présentation et notes, Klincksieck, coll. « L'esprit et les formes »
- 1984 La Mythologie comprise. L'interprétation schellingienne du paganisme, Bibliopolis, Naples
- 1986 La Christologie idéaliste, préface de Joseph Doré, Desclée de Brouwer, coll. « Jésus et Jésus-Christ », 240 p.
- 1987 L'Absolu et la Philosophie. Essais sur Schelling, coll. « Épiméthée », PUF
- 1990 Le Christ de la philosophie, Cerf, coll. « Cogitatio Fidei », 295 p., prix Montyon de l'Académie française 1991
- 1992 La Semaine sainte des philosophes, Desclée, coll. « Jésus et Jésus-Christ »
- 1993 Le Christ des philosophes : Du Maître de sagesse au divin Témoin, Culture et Vérité, Namur
- 1995 Recherches sur l'intuition intellectuelle, de Kant à Hegel, Vrin
- 1999 Schelling, Biographie, Calmann-Lévy, coll. « La vie des philosophes »
- 2001 Les philosophes lisent la Bible, Cerf, 200 p., prix du Cardinal Grente de l'Académie française ainsi que pour l'ensemble de son œuvre
- 2001 La Mémoire et l'Invisible, éd. Ad Solem, Genève
- 2002 Jésus romantique, Desclée-Mame
- 2003 Fichte. La science de la liberté, préface de Reinhard Lauth, Vrin
- 2005 Le Jésuite et le Poète, Éloge jubilaire à Paul Claudel, éd. de Paris, Versailles
- 2006 L'Église des philosophes, de Nicolas de Cuse à Gabriel Marcel, Cerf Recension en ligne in Esprit & Vie
- 2006 Philosophies eucharistiques, de Descartes à Blondel, Cerf, 180 p., médaille Humboldt 2006
- 2007 Une introduction à Schelling, Honoré Champion

With other authors

- Jean Wahl et Gabriel Marcel, avec Emmanuel Lévinas et Paul Ricœur, Beauchesne, 1976, 96 p., ISBN 2-7010-0240-0
- Hommage au Père Marcel Régnier, Archives de philosophie, 1999, Présentation en ligne

Written in Italian or in German

- Il Cristo dei non-credenti e altri saggi di filosofia cristiana, Editoria Ave, Roma, 1994
- Omaggi, Filosofi italiani del nostro tempo : Michele Federico Sciacca, Enrico Castelli Gattinara di Zubiena, Luigi Pareyson, Augusto Del Noce, Alberto Caracciolo, Italo Mancini, Enrico Garulli, Arturo Massolo, Pasquale Salvucci, Morcelliana, Brescia, 1997, 92 p.
- Del male e del bene, con Giuseppe Riconda (a cura di Francesco Tomatis), Città Nuova Editrice, Roma, 2001
- Che cos'è cristologia filosofica, Morcelliana, 2004
- Schellings Pyrmonter Elegie. Der Briefwechsel mit Eliza Tapp, 1849–1854 (en collaboration), V. Klostermann, Frankfurt-am-Main, 2000

Essays published in the following reviews

- Étvdes
- Recherches de science religieuse
- Revue de métaphysique et de morale
- Archives de philosophie
- Communio
- Christus
