= Dean Moyar =

American philosopher

- Awards: Berlin Prize

Academic background
- Education: University of Chicago (PhD)
- Thesis: Hegel's Conscience: Radical Subjectivity and Rational Institutions (2002)
- Doctoral advisor: Robert B. Pippin
- Influences: Hegel, Kant

Academic work
- Era: 21st century Philosophy
- Region: Western philosophy
- School or tradition: German idealism
- Institutions: Johns Hopkins University
- Main interests: Philosophy of Hegel
- Website: www.deanmoyar.com

Dean Franklin Moyar is an American philosopher and professor of philosophy at Johns Hopkins University. He is known for his expertise on Kant and German Idealism.

== Books ==
- Hegel's Value: Justice as the Living Good (OUP, 2021)
- The Oxford Handbook of Hegel (ed.) (OUP, 2017)
- Hegel's Conscience (OUP, 2011)
- The Routledge Companion to Nineteenth Century Philosophy (ed.) (2010),
- Hegel's Phenomenology of Spirit: A Critical Guide (ed.) (CUP, 2008)
