= Ratzinger Circle of Alumni =

Forerunner of the Ratzinger Foundation

The Ratzinger Circle of Alumni is an initiative by former doctoral and post-doctoral students of theologian Joseph Ratzinger (later Pope Benedict XVI). The Alumni Circle is composed of former students of the universities of Bonn 1959–1963, Münster 1963–1966, Tübingen 1966–1969 and Regensburg 1969–1977. The former students, most of them distinguished professors today, meet with their professor annually in order to discuss and study with their teacher important theological issues while celebrating their devotion to what they consider a special responsibility for the spiritual heritage of their teacher.

== Background ==
The first meeting took place in 1978 and is repeated annually. The long tradition was not interrupted during the Papacy of Ratzinger, despite his role and commitments. This initiative led the alumni to create a foundation, the Ratzinger Foundation and later an award, given to theologians and philosophers every two years.

== Members ==
The 44 members of the Ratzinger Circle of Alumni are:

- Prof. Barthélemy Adoukonou, Abidjan, Ivory Coast
- Dr. Roman Angulanza, Salzburg, Austria
- Dr. Francine Cottage, Münster, Germany
- Prof. em. Wolfgang Beinert, Pentling, Germany
- Dr. P. Martin Bialas Č.p., Schwarzenfeld, Germany
- Dr. Catherine M. Bommes, Regensburg, Germany
- Prof. em. DDr. Werner Broker, Greven, Germany
- Prof. em. Dr. John Dormann, Bösensell, Germany
- Prof. Dr. P. P. Joseph Fessio, Ave Maria University, Florida, United States
- Prof. Dr. Henrique de Noronha Galvão, Lisbon, Portugal
- Prof. em. Dr. Hahn P.Viktor Czechoslovakia, Cologne
- Dr.Dr. Erich Heck, Cologne-Lindenthal, Germany
- Pastor I.R. Prelate Dr. Michael Hofmann, Fürth, Germany
- Prof. em. Dr. Stephen P. Horn SDS, parish churches and Rome, Italy
- Rev. Dr. Werner Hülsenbusch, Münster, Germany
- Auxiliary Bishop Hans-Jochen Jaschke, Hamburg
- Prof. Jung-Hi (Victoria) Kim, Gwangju, South Korea
- Canon Hans Kümmeringer, Salzweg, Germany
- Prof. Dr. Dr. Peter Kuhn, Munich, Germany
- Dr. John P. Lehmann Dronke CRV, Weilheim, Germany
- Sister Dr. Mechtild Linde, Rees, Germany
- Sr. Maria Lugosi SSS, Kenmore, New York, United States
- Dr. Charles MacDonald, Nova Scotia, Canada
- Dr. Venicio Marcolino, Tübingen, Germany
- Dr. P. Michael John Marmann, Munich, Germany
- Prelate Dr. Helmut Moll, Cologne, Germany
- Prof. em. Dr. Vincent Pfnür, Münster, Germany
- L. Rev. Dr. Seamus Ryan, Dublin, Ireland
- Father Antoine Saroyan, Glendale, California, United States
- Prelate Emeritus Professor. Dr. Theo Schäfer, Niederzissen, Germany
- Pastor Udo M. Schiffer, King Winter Ittenbach, Germany
- Senior teacher Wolfram Schmidt, Kelheim, Germany
- Vicar General Hubert J.G.M. Schnackers, Roermond, The Netherlands
- Prof. Dr. P. Cardinal Christoph Schönborn OP, Vienna, Austria
- Rev. Fr Prof. Alex Thannippara CMI Bellampalli, India
- Prof. Dr. P. Réal Tremblay Rome, Italy
- Rev. Dr. Martin Trimpe, Lingen - Laxten, Germany
- Prof. em. P. Dr. Vincent Twomey SVD, Maynooth, Ireland
- Prof. Dr. Hans Jürgen Verweyen, Merzhausen, Germany
- Dr. theol. hab. Louis Weimer, Bad Tolz, Germany
- Prof. em. Dr. Siegfried Wiedenhofer, Unterliederbach a. Ts., Germany
- Prof. em. Dr. Joseph Wohlmuth, Bonn, Germany
- Senior teacher a.e.H. Dr. Josef Zöhrer, Germany
- Dr. Cornelio Del Zotto, OFM, Rome, Italy
