= Gary L. Watson =

American philosopher

Gary L. Watson is an American philosopher. He is provost professor emeritus of law and philosophy at the University of Southern California.

He was elected a Fellow of the American Academy of Arts and Sciences in 2014.
