= Cyril O'Regan =

Irish theologian

Cyril J. O'Regan
- Born: 1952 (age 73–74)
- Citizenship: Irish
- Occupation: theologian

Academic background
- Education: University College Dublin; Yale University (PhD)
- Thesis: The Heterodox Hegel: Trinitarian Ontotheology and Gnostic Narrative (1989)
- Doctoral advisor: Louis Dupré, Hans Frei, George Lindbeck, John E. Smith

Academic work
- Discipline: Theology
- Sub-discipline: gnosticism
- Institutions: University of Notre Dame
- Website: https://theology.nd.edu/people/cyril-oregan/

Cyril J. O'Regan (born 1952) is an Irish theologian writer with particular expertise in mystical theology.

== Career ==
O'Regan studied at University College Dublin gaining a BA and MA. He studied at Yale University earning an MA, MLitt and PhD. He was appointed Catherine F. Huisking Professor of Theology at the University of Notre Dame.

O'Regan was awarded the Ratzinger Prize in 2024, alongside Japanese sculptor Etsuro Sotoo.

== Research ==
He specialises in systematic theology and historical theology, with a specific interest in continental philosophy, religious literature, mystical theology and post-modern thought.

He is best known for his multi-volume gnosticism series. This series began with Gnostic Return in Modernity and continued in Gnostic Apocalypse: Jacob Boehme's Haunted Narrative. Discussing a project attempted in the nineteenth century by a leader of the Tübingen school of theology, Ferdinand Christian Baur, O'Regan attempts to identify a gnostic structure or "grammar" that can be traced through sources and authors as diverse as Valentinianism and William Blake. By identifying this grammar, he hoped to find a way to distinguish works of gnosticism from other types with superficial resemblances, such as writings in Neoplatonism. As a Christian theologian, he also hopes to equip theologians to avoid gnosticism, which he sees as an alternative contrary to genuine Christian faith yet, by its nature, one that is present in every era. This project is in some ways similar to that of Eric Voegelin, who in his Science, Politics and Gnosticism (1968) attempted to identify some core features of gnosticism that he viewed as dangerous, though the two thinkers disagree about how to define gnosticism and why it should be rejected.

Upon the completion of the von Balthasar series with the second Anatomy of Misremembering volume, O'Regan will focus his attention on two further volumes in his gnosticism series. The next volume, the third in the series, will focus on German Idealism (chiefly, G. W. F. Hegel, F. W. J. Schelling, and Johann Gottlieb Fichte), with a later, fourth volume covering German and English Romanticism (chiefly, William Blake, Johann Christian Friedrich Hölderlin and Georg Philipp Friedrich Freiherr von Hardenberg (Novalis). In advocating for new ways of recognizing gnosticism, O'Regan draws on categories such as metalepsis that he developed in his earlier work, The Heterodox Hegel. O'Regan has also written widely in monographs and reviews on the concept of the apocalyptic.

O'Regan strives at "showing how Boehme's discourse is Valentinian" and "Philadelphian Society and William Law in England, Pietism in Germany, Louis Claude de St. Martin in France, and Swedenborg in Sweden, and the theosophy societies of the twentieth century" had "repeat Boehme's discourse in a very determinate way"

O'Regan states that "The redemptive activity of Christ in Luther obviously presupposes a fallen humanity, which in turn points back to creatureliness and createdness."

O'Regan in Gnostic Apocalypse asserts his "conversation with not only with David Walsh and the Voegelin school of interpretation, but also with the radically different kind of genealogy of Michel Foucault".

O'Regan countered the Gnostic response to the problem of evil in Gnostic Apocalypse: Jacob Boehme's Haunted Narrative.

O'Regan remarks,

it is faith, not knowledge, we are talking about. Job does not gain a rational explanation of why there is so much suffering in the world, of why the innocent are suffering. He does not achieve such a point of view, no more than Fr. Paneloux in The Plague by Albert Camus. No explanation is granted whereby the agonizing paradox of suffering and the existence of the good and just God is “resolved.” Faith will mean saying no to history while not saying not to God who relates to us in history. In short, the book of Job provides no theodicy. https://churchlifejournal.nd.edu/articles/job-and-the-problem-of-evil-versus-the-tribunal-of-history/

He has discussed Slavoj Zizek

I admit the complexity of my analysis, but plead that it corresponds to the complexity of the subject matter—that is, Boehme’s visionary or apocalypse discourse. But even if this is granted me, I still have some explaining to do. Why deploy a sophisticated conceptual apparatus of general constructs such as Valentinian narrative grammar, rule-governed deformation of classical Valentinian genres, metalepsis, and Valentinian enlisting of non-Valentinian narrative discourse, and more specific constructs such as apocalyptic inscription, apocalyptic distention, narrative deconstitution of negative theology, and aporetics of representation on such a relatively arcane discursive specimen as Jacob Boehme. Even if we listen seriously to Boehme’s commentators, hear what genealogists such as Baur, Staudenmaier, and Walsh have to say, and recall what Hegel said about the importance of a speculative thinker who with Bacon and Descartes contributes to the formation of specifically modern philosophical discourse, deployment of this conceptual apparatus looks like serious overkill. The style of interpretation in operation seems to amount to taking a machine gun to swat a fly. Although accurate characterization is a true good, Why hard-pedal in the way I do the following conclusions?

I'm Irish; I always think words can do better than pictures, and of course I am a scandal to the modern age.

== Bibliography ==
- O'Regan, Cyril, 1994, The Heterodox Hegel. Albany: State University of New York (SUNY) Press.
- O'Regan, Cyril, 2001, Gnostic Return in Modernity. Albany: SUNY Press.
- O'Regan, Cyril, 2002, Gnostic Apocalypse: Jacob Boehme's Haunted Narrative. Albany: SUNY Press.
- O'Regan, Cyril, 2004, "Countermimesis and Simone Weil's Christian Platonism." In E. Jane Doering and Eric O. Springsted, eds., The Christian Platonism of Simone Weil. Notre Dame: University of Notre Dame Press, 181–208.
- O'Regan, Cyril, 2009, Theology and the Spaces of Apocalyptic. Milwaukee: Marquette University Press.
- O'Regan, Cyril, 2013, Foreword in Sarah Morice-Brubaker, The Place of the Spirit: Toward a Trinitarian Theology of Location. Eugene: Pickwick, ix–xiii.
- O'Regan, Cyril, 2014, The Anatomy of Misremembering: Von Balthasar’s Response to Philosophical Modernity, Volume 1: Hegel. Chestnut Ridge: Crossroad Publishing.
- O'Regan, Cyril, forthcoming, The Anatomy of Misremembering: Von Balthasar's Response to Philosophical Modernity, Volume 2: Heidegger. Chestnut Ridge: Crossroad Publishing.
