= Philip T. Grier =

American philosopher (born 1942)

Philip Grier
- Born: 1942 (age 83–84)

Education
- Education: Swarthmore College (BA), Balliol College, Oxford (BA, MA) University of Michigan (PhD)

Philosophical work
- Era: 21st-century philosophy
- Region: Western philosophy
- Institutions: Dickinson College, Northwestern University, University of Keele
- Main interests: Hegelian philosophy, 19th century philosophy, political and social philosophy, ethics, philosophy of law, history of modern philosophy, Russian philosophy.

Philip T. Grier (born 1942) is an American philosopher and Thomas Bowman Professor of Philosophy and Religion, Emeritus at Dickinson College. Grier is known for his works on Hegelian philosophy, Marxist theory and Russian philosophy.

== Books ==
- Marxist Ethical Theory in the Soviet Union, Springer Dordrecht 2011
- Identity and Difference: Studies in Hegel's Logic, Philosophy of Spirit, and Politics (ed.), SUNY Press 2007
- Dialectic and Contemporary Science: Essays in Honor of Errol E. Harris (ed.), University Press of America 1989
- Ivan A. Il'in, The Philosophy of Hegel as a Doctrine of the Concreteness of God and Humanity, Volume Two: The Doctrine of Humanity, Philip T. Grier (ed., tr.), Northwestern University Press 2011
