= Henry E. Allison =

American philosopher (1937–2023)

- Born: Henry Edward Allison; April 25, 1937
- Died: June 5, 2023 (aged 86)

Academic background
- Education: Yale University (BA); Columbia University; Union Theological Seminary (New York) (MA); New School for Social Research (PhD)
- Thesis: Lessing and the Enlightenment: A Study of G. E. Lessing's Philosophy of Religion and of Its Place Within the Context of Eighteenth-Century Thought (1964)
- Doctoral advisor: Aron Gurwitsch
- Other advisors: Hans Jonas, Albert Salomon

Academic work
- Era: Contemporary philosophy
- Region: Western philosophy
- Institutions: University of California, San Diego
- Main interests: Immanuel Kant
- Notable ideas: "Two aspect" (or "two standpoint") interpretation of transcendental idealism

Henry Edward Allison (April 25, 1937 – June 5, 2023) was an American scholar of Immanuel Kant, widely considered to be one of the most eminent English-language Kant scholars of the postwar era. He was a professor and chair of the Philosophy Department at the University of California, San Diego and a professor at Boston University.

== Life and career ==
Allison graduated from Yale University with a B.A. in Philosophy in 1959. He wanted to work on philosophy of religion, and so he enrolled at Columbia University; it had a joint master's program with Union Theological Seminary (New York). He received his M.A. in 1961. He then entered the Ph.D. program in philosophy at Columbia. However, he signed up for a course on the Critique of Pure Reason taught by Aron Gurwitsch at the New School for Social Research. As a result, "I did decide to transfer to the New School and work with Gurwitsch." He earned his Ph.D. in philosophy at the New School for Social research in 1964 with a dissertation on Lessing written under the direction of Gurwitsch. After teaching at the State University of New York at Potsdam, the Pennsylvania State University, and the University of Florida, he taught from 1973 until 1996 at the University of California, San Diego, where an endowed chair was named in his honor. After a visiting appointment as the John Findlay Visiting Professor in 1995, he joined the faculty at Boston University in 1996, remaining until 2004. His final appointment was at the University of California, Davis. He was a fellow of the Norwegian Academy of Science and Letters from 1996 and a Fellow of the American Academy of Arts & Sciences in 2023. He died before he could be inducted, on June 5, 2023, at the age of 86.

== Philosophical work ==
His areas of interest were Immanuel Kant, Baruch Spinoza, German idealism, 18th and 19th century philosophy. Allison was perhaps best known for his 1983 book, Kant's Transcendental Idealism: An Interpretation and Defense, which proposed a new "epistemological" reading of the Critique of Pure Reason that was both radically different from standard interpretations and offered responses to many of the objections advanced by philosophers like Paul Guyer. The "two aspect" reading "interprets transcendental idealism as a fundamentally epistemological theory that distinguishes between two standpoints on the objects of experience: the human standpoint, from which objects are viewed relative to epistemic conditions that are peculiar to human cognitive faculties (namely, the a priori forms of our sensible intuition); and the standpoint of an intuitive intellect, from which the same objects could be known in themselves and independently of any epistemic conditions."

== Bibliography ==
- Lessing and the Enlightenment. Michigan University Press (1966). 2nd. ed., State University of New York Press (2018).
- The Kant-Eberhard Controversy. The Johns Hopkins University Press (1973).
- Benedict de Spinoza. Twayne Publishers (1975). Rev. ed., Yale University Press, 1987.
- Kant's Transcendental Idealism: An Interpretation and Defense. Yale University Press (1983).
- Kant's Theory of Freedom. Cambridge University Press (1990).
- Idealism and Freedom: Essays on Kant's Theoretical and Practical Philosophy. Cambridge University Press (1996).
- Kant's Theory of Taste: A Reading of the Critique of Aesthetic Judgment. Cambridge University Press (2001).
- Kant's Transcendental Idealism: An Interpretation and Defense. Rev. ed., Yale University Press (2004).
- Custom and Reason in Hume: A Kantian Reading of the First Book of the Treatise. Oxford: Clarendon Press (2008).
- Kant's Groundwork for the Metaphysics of Morals: A Commentary. Oxford University Press (2011).
- Essays on Kant. Oxford University Press (2012).
- Kant's Transcental Deduction: An Analytical-Historical Commentary. Oxford University Press (2015).
- Kant's Conception of Freedom: A Developmental and Critical Analysis. Cambridge University Press (2020).
- An Introduction to the Philosophy of Spinoza. Cambridge University Press (2022).
