= Karl Wilhelm Ferdinand Solger =

German philosopher and academic (1780–1819)

Karl Wilhelm Ferdinand Solger (28 November 1780, Schwedt – 20 October 1819, Berlin) was a German philosopher and academic. He is known as a theorist of Romanticism, and of irony.

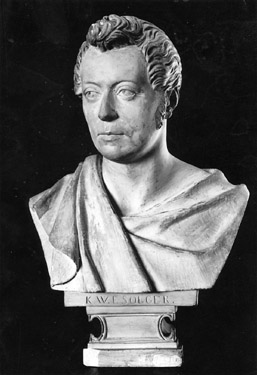
Bust of Karl Wilhelm Ferdinand Solger

== Biography ==
Solger's extensive studies included attending Friedrich Wilhelm Joseph Schelling's Darstellung meines Systems der Philosophie [Presentation of My System of Philosophy] lectures at the University of Jena in 1800–01 and Johann Gottlieb Fichte's "Wissenschaftslehre" lectures in Berlin 1804. In 1811, Solger became professor of philosophy at the University of Berlin

== Works ==
- Des Sophokles Tragödien [Sophocles' Tragedies] (2 vols., 1808; 2d ed., 1824)
- Erwin, Vier Gespräche über das Schöne und die Kunst [Erwin, or Four Dialogues on Beauty and Art] (2 vols., 1815) [A work on aesthetics, in which he took issue with August Wilhelm Schlegel, and which influenced both Hegel and Heinrich Heine.]
- Philosophische Gespräche [Philosophical Dialogues] (1817)
- Solger's nachgelassene Schriften und Briefwechsel [Posthumous writings and letters], edited by Tieck and Raumer (2 vols., 1826)
- K. W. F. Solger’s Vorlesungen über Aesthetik [Lectures in Aesthetics], edited by Heyse (1829)
