= Terry Pinkard =

American philosopher

- Born: Terry P. Pinkard; 1947 (age 78–79)

Education
- Education: University of Texas at Austin (BA, MA); Stony Brook University (PhD)
- Thesis: The Foundations of Transcendental Idealism: Kant, Hegel, Husserl (1975)
- Doctoral advisor: Patrick A. Heelan

Philosophical work
- Era: Contemporary philosophy
- Region: Western philosophy
- School: Continental philosophy, Hegelianism, postanalytic philosophy
- Institutions: Georgetown University
- Main interests: History of philosophy, philosophy of politics, epistemology, ethics, aesthetics, modernity
- Notable ideas: Historical shapes of justice

Terry P. Pinkard (born 1947) is an American philosopher and distinguished university professor emeritus at Georgetown University. His research and teaching focus on the German tradition in philosophy from Kant to the present. In addition to his own thought, Pinkard is a "noted Hegel scholar" whose translation of Hegel's The Phenomenology of Spirit is "accomplished" and "admirably clear."

== Education and career ==
Pinkard earned his B.A. and M.A. from the University of Texas at Austin and his Ph.D. from Stony Brook University with the dissertation, The Foundations of Transcendental Idealism: Kant, Hegel, Husserl. He taught at Georgetown University from 1975 to 2000, at Northwestern University from 2000 to 2005, but returned to Georgetown in 2005.

== Selected publications ==
- Pinkard, Terry (2023). Hegel's Phenomenology of Spirit. doi:10.1093/oso/9780197663127.001.0001. ISBN 978-0-19-766312-7.
- Pinkard, Terry (2022). Practice, Power, and Forms of Life: Practice, Power, and Forms of Life. doi:10.7208/chicago/9780226815473.001.0001. ISBN 978-0-226-81324-0.
- Pinkard, Terry (2017). Does History Make Sense?: Hegel on the Historical Shapes of Justice. Harvard University Press. doi:10.4159/9780674978782. ISBN 978-0-674-97878-2.
- Pinkard, Terry (2012). Hegel's Naturalism, Mind, Nature, and the Final Ends of Life. doi:10.1093/acprof:oso/9780199860791.001.0001. ISBN 978-0-19-986079-1.
- Pinkard, Terry (2002). German Philosophy 1760–1860. doi:10.1017/CBO9780511801846. ISBN 978-0-521-66381-6.
- Pinkard, Terry (2000). Hegel: A Biography. Cambridge: Cambridge University Press. ISBN 9780521496797.
- Pinkard, Terry (1994). Hegel's Phenomenology. doi:10.1017/CBO9781316036433. ISBN 978-0-521-56834-0.

=== Translations ===
- Hegel, Georg Wilhelm Fredrich (2018). Pinkard, Terry; Baur, Michael (eds.). Georg Wilhelm Friedrich Hegel: The Phenomenology of Spirit. doi:10.1017/9781139050494. ISBN 978-1-139-05049-4.
