= Paul Redding =

Philosopher

- Born: 1948 (age 77–78); Sydney, Australia

Education
- Education: University of New South Wales; University of Sydney
- Thesis: The Dialectic of Text and Context: Language, Understanding and the Human Sciences (1984)
- Doctoral advisor: Bill Bonney, John Burnheim, György Márkus

Philosophical work
- Era: Contemporary philosophy
- Region: Western philosophy
- School: German idealism
- Institutions: University of Sydney
- Main interests: Philosophy of religion, history of philosophy

Paul Redding (born 1948) is an Australian philosopher and emeritus professor of philosophy at the University of Sydney. He is known for his research on Hegel's philosophy and the tradition of German idealism more generally. In particular he has pursued the relation of Hegel's logic to the approach to logic in analytic philosophy and pragmatism and, more recently, the tradition of Platonism. He is a fellow of the Australian Academy of the Humanities.

== Education ==
Redding earned his PhD in 1984 from the University of Sydney.

== Bibliography ==
- Redding, P. (2023). Conceptual Harmonies: The Origins and Relevance of Hegel's Logic. Chicago: University of Chicago Press.
- Redding, P. (2016). Thoughts, Deeds, Words, and World: Hegel's Idealist Response to the Linguistic "Metacritical Invasion". Noesis Press imprint of Davies Group, Publishers.
- Redding, P. (2009). Continental Idealism: Leibniz to Nietzsche. Abingdon: Routledge imprint of Taylor & Francis.
- Redding, P. (2007). Analytic Philosophy and the Return of Hegelian Thought. Cambridge: Cambridge University Press.
- Bubbio, P., Redding, P. (2012). Religion After Kant: God and Culture in the Idealist Era. Newcastle upon Tyne: Cambridge Scholars Publishing.
- Redding, P. (1999). The Logic of Affect. Ithaca: Cornell University Press.
- Redding, P. (1996). Hegel's Hermeneutics. Ithaca: Cornell University Press.
