= Philosophy & Rhetoric =

Academic journal

- Discipline: Philosophy, rhetoric
- Language: English
- Edited by: Omedi Ochieng

Publication details
- History: 1968–present
- Publisher: Penn State University Press (United States)
- Frequency: Quarterly

Standard abbreviations
- ISO 4: Philos. Rhetor.

Indexing
- ISSN: 0031-8213 (print); 1527-2079 (web)
- JSTOR: 00318213
- OCLC no.: 1715085

Links
- Journal homepage; Online access at Project MUSE

Philosophy & Rhetoric is a quarterly peer-reviewed academic journal covering rhetorical theory, ethics, continental philosophy, informal logic, argumentation theory, critical social theory, and political theory. It is published by Penn State University Press and was established in 1968. The editor-in-chief is Omedi Ochieng. The journal was established in 1968 by Henry Johnstone Jr. and Carroll Arnold, who saw a need for a journal that would, among other things, investigate "rhetoric as a philosophical concept".

Johnstone was the journal's first editor, serving from 1967 to 1977, and then again from 1987 to 1997. Next to Johnstone, Gerard A. Hauser was the longest serving editor of the journal, filling the post from 1987 to 1993, and then from 2003 to 2017.

== Abstracting and indexing ==
The journal is abstracted and indexed in the Arts and Humanities Citation Index, Current Contents/Arts & Humanities, International Bibliography of Periodical Literature, MLA International Bibliography, and Scopus.

== Editors-in-chief ==
The following persons are or have been editor-in-chief:

- Omedi Ochieng, 2025-present
- Erik Doxtader, 2018–2025
- Gerard A. Hauser, 2003–2017
- Stephen H. Browne, 2003
- Richard A. Lee, 2000–2002
- Richard Doyle, 1998–2002
- Pierre Kerszberg, 1998–1999
- Marie Secor, 1994–1997
- Stephen H. Browne, 1994–2003
- Gerard A. Hauser, 1990–1993
- Henry Johnstone Jr., 1987–1997
- Donald Verene, 1977-1987
- Henry Johnstone Jr., 1967–1977

== Special issues ==
Occasionally, the journal publishes special issues dedicated to a specific subject. Past special issues have been:

- 2024 - "The State of Movement - or, Unassuming Theory" - Edited by Erik Doxtader
- 2023 - "The Time of Africana Philosophy" - Edited by Omedi Ochieng
- 2022 - "What cannot be said?" - Edited by Erik Doxtader
- 2020 - "In the Midst of SARS-COV-2/COVID-19" - Edited by Erik Doxtader
- 2018 - "Post-truth" - Edited by Barbara A. Biesecker
- 2017 - Philosophy & Rhetoric at 50 - Edited by Gerard Hauser
- 2016 - Speech in Revolt: Rancière, Rhetoric, Politics - Edited by Michaele L. Ferguson
- 2015 - The Rhetorical Contours of Recognition - Edited by Sarah Burgess
- 2014 - Extrahuman Rhetorical Relations: Addressing the Animal, the Object, the Dead, and the Divine - Edited by Diane Davis and Michelle Ballif
- 2013 - Rhetoric's Contributions to the Study of Argumentation - Edited by Ralph H. Johnson and Christopher W. Tindale
- 2012 - Between Philosophy and Rhetoric--Essays in Honor of Michael C. Leff - Edited by Stephen Browne
- 2011 - On Walter Benjamin - Edited by James Martel
- 2010 - The New Rhetoric - Edited by James Crosswhite
- 2009 - France: Current Writing in Philosophy and Rhetoric - Edited by Philippe-Joseph Salazar
- 2008 - Inventing the Potential of Rhetorical Culture—The Work and Legacy of Thomas B. Farrell - Edited by Erik Doxtader
- 2007 - Philosophy & Rhetoric—40th Anniversary - Edited by Gerard Hauser
- 2005 - Emmanuel Levinas: The Rhetoric of Ethics - Edited by Claire Katz
