= Politics and technology =

Politics and technology encompasses concepts, mechanisms, personalities, efforts, and social movements that include, but are not necessarily limited to, the Internet and other information and communication technologies (ICTs). Scholars have begun to explore how internet technologies influence political communication and participation, especially in terms of what is known as the public sphere.

The smartphone is a communication technology that includes features such as voice calls, text messaging, internet access, email, images, video, and applications. Mobile devices are one of the important reasons for the rise of political participation and are now portrayed as a voting agent in the least developed countries. Increased availability of mobile phones, and subsequent access to the public sphere, has enhanced individuals' and groups' ability to bring attention to and organize around specialized issues.

More recently, social media has emerged as one of the main platforms for politics. Millions of users can learn about politicians' policies and statements, interact with political leaders, organize, and voice their own opinions on political matters. Political campaigns are also using social media sites to reach voters using political advertising.

There is also a wide variety of online tools meant to promote political participation and combat the spread of misinformation. A comparison of civic technology platforms can be useful in differentiating the different services offered by each platform.

== The digital public sphere ==
The idea of the public sphere has generally come to be understood as the open social spaces and public spaces in which private citizens interact and share information and ideas relevant to society. These can include, for example, town halls, public squares, markets, coffee shops, or what ancient Greeks called agoras. Scholars have argued that these spaces are vital for creating and maintaining an active, informed public in a democratic society.

In Jürgen Habermas' book The Structural Transformation of the Public Sphere – An Inquiry into a Category of Bourgeois Society, he defines the public sphere as "a realm of social life in which public opinion can be formed." In principle, the public sphere should be open to all citizens and free from influence from governments or private businesses. Habermas goes on to argue that:

"A portion of the public sphere is constituted in every conversation in which private persons come together to form a public. They are then acting neither as business or professional people conducting their private affairs nor as legal consociates subject to the legal regulations of a state bureaucracy and obligated to obey. Citizens act as a public when they deal with matters of general interest without being subject to coercion; thus with the guarantee that they may assemble and unite freely, and express and publicize their opinions freely."

Howard Rheingold states that "There is an intimate connection between informal conversations, the kind that takes place in communities... and the ability of large social groups to govern themselves without monarchs or dictators." Rheingold and others have gone on to argue that virtual spaces created through the Internet and related information and communications technologies have led to the emergence of a new type of digital public sphere. Some scholars have conceptualized this alternately as a virtual public sphere or a networked public sphere, while still others have similarly described what they call a networked society or networked publics. Essentially, these new virtual spaces can be used in much the same way as traditional, offline spaces: that is, as a "free space" to discuss and debate ideas of public importance. Just as the public sphere is a combination of "every conversation in which private persons come together to form a public", the digital public sphere also comprises all forms of new media—such as chat rooms, website comment sections, and social media—in which private citizens engage in discourse as a public. Virtual spaces may overlap or interact with offline spaces as well, forming what has been called "hybrid networks".

Scholars argue that social media affords increasing opportunities for political discourse and mobilization within the digital public sphere. Research has shown that increased use of social media correlates with increases in certain types of political engagement and participation. Rabia Karakaya Polat, a politics and technology scholar, finds that the Internet leads to a more informed and better society. The Internet enables information to be dispersed at an increased rate, compared to traditional means, at little cost. For most users, the amount of information can be helpful to understand various political atmospheres but can also overwhelm users. The digital public sphere thus has the potential to enliven democratic culture and enhance the ability of citizens to challenge the political and economic power of governments and corporations, such as through online protests, activism campaigns, and social movements. Other scholars have highlighted, alongside economic globalization, the role of Internet technologies in reaching across national borders to contribute to a growing transnational public sphere.

== Criticisms ==
=== Social exclusion ===
The traditional, offline public sphere has been criticized for not being as inclusive in practice as it is in theory. For example, Feminist scholars like Nancy Fraser have argued that the public sphere has historically not been as open or accessible to disadvantaged or marginalized groups in a society, such as women or people of color; therefore, such groups are forced to form their own separate public spheres, which she refers to as a counter-public or subaltern counter public (see Public sphere § Counterpublics, feminist critiques and expansions).

Some scholars contend that online spaces are more open and thus may help to increase inclusive political participation from marginalized groups. In particular, anonymous online spaces should allow all individuals to speak with an equal voice to others. However, others have pointed out that many contemporary online spaces are not anonymous, such as Facebook. Avatars and social media profiles often portray an individual's offline identity, which can lead to practices of online discrimination and exclusion which mirror offline inequalities. Now, more and more historically disadvantaged or marginalized groups are also using Internet technology to carve out new online spaces for their own "networked counterpublics", such as through the use of hashtags like #Ferguson and #BlackLivesMatter.

Another example of social exclusion happens when users homogenize their information by finding information that reinforces their opinions or websites with the most content or are promoted consistently. This can lead users to ignore sites that are less frequently promoted. Evidence of this was discovered by Steven M. Schneider, who found that although participation was overwhelmingly large on internet chat rooms discussing politics of abortion, the chat log was influenced and controlled by users that contributed the most content, with those who responded less frequently typically agreeing or adjusting their opinions based on the users who contributed more.

=== The digital divide ===
Another factor that affects access to the digital public sphere is the digital divide, which refers to how people from less developed countries tend to have less access to information and communications technologies compared to those from more developed countries. For example, the most developed regions of the world, such as North America and Western Europe, have the highest Internet penetration rates at over 80% each, while the least developed countries such as in Africa and South Asia have less than 30% each. On the other hand, the reduced cost and increasing availability of mobile devices such as smartphones throughout less developed regions is helping to reduce this disparity at an exponential rate. In just two years, between 2013 and 2015, the number of Internet users in developing nations has risen by 9%, according to the Pew Research Center. Other research has shown, though, that even within more developed countries like the United States, the digital divide continues to persist between upper and lower socioeconomic classes and between different education levels. Furthermore, scholars like Mark Warschauer argue that it is not just access to technology that matters, but the knowledge of how to put that technology to use in meaningful ways.

=== Use of Bots and Sock Puppets ===
Internet bots, or web robots, robots or simply bots, are software applications that run automated tasks (scripts) over the Internet. Typically, bots perform tasks that are both simple and repetitive, at a much higher rate than would be possible for a human alone. The largest use of bots is in web spidering, in which an automated script fetches, analyzes, and files information from web servers at many times the speed of a human. More than half of all web traffic is generated by bots. Software can detect and confirm the presence of bots through qualitative coding. An example would be the Bot-a-meter, developed by Indiana University, which evaluates 7 different factors to determine whether or not a request is generated by a bot.

A Sock Puppet is an online identity used for purposes of deception. The term originally referred to a false identity assumed by a member of an Internet community who is pretending to be another person. The term has come to designate other misleading uses of online identities, such as those created to praise, defend or support a person or organization, to manipulate public opinion, to skew online voting results, or to evade blocks. There is significant evidence to indicate that the Internet Research Agency, a group of professional Russian trolls, created fake accounts on major networking sites and online newspapers, to promote specific Ukrainian, Middle Eastern, and American political issues, even advocating for Trump as early as December 2015.

=== Ease of manipulation ===
Citizens involved in politics have experienced a sense of security while physically attending a polling place or submitting their vote through mail. Such experiences now have digital counterparts. In areas like the United States, online voting has been developing through smartphone applications or secure websites. Online voting allows more citizens to exercise their right to vote by breaking down the physical barriers that may keep voters away from the polls.

As an unwanted result, online voting is easier to manipulate. Social media apps such as Instagram or Facebook have taken the initiative to get people registered and motivated to go and vote. Despite their efforts, social media accounts are engineered to misinform the public, causing a jaded perspective toward electable candidates or understanding policies.

Another way users are manipulated is by directly interfering with the vote. In the 2016 U.S. election, J. Alex Halderman, a computer scientist and director of computer security at the University of Michigan, advocated for the Clinton campaign to request a recount in the states of Wisconsin, Michigan, and Pennsylvania, which were thought to be lost by her through the computer manipulation of voting machines.

In the 2020 Iowa caucuses, the Iowa Democratic Party used a new mobile app to count and transmit primary election results live in real-time. Official users of the application suffered from reporting issues, leading to incomplete data and a bottleneck during transmission. Since the 2020 Iowa caucuses, other state's Democratic parties have declined to use the Shadow Inc. application for their state's primaries. Marian Schneider, the president of Verified Voting, released a statement that says,

"The situation with Iowa's caucus reveals the risks associated with technology, in this case with a mobile app, but more importantly that there needs to be a low-tech solution to recover from technological failures -- no matter the cause; there needs to be a way to monitor, detect, respond and recover. It's clear that mobile apps are not ready for prime time, but thankfully, Iowa has paper records of their vote totals and will be able to release results from those records."

=== Social Media as a channel of distribution ===
Studies show that social media allows politicians to easily engage with the general public without mainstream media. This allows them to express and present themselves however they deem fit, without a filter or fact-checking. This is evident from recent US presidential campaigns, where voters were able to connect with Trump, not only as a politician but as a person. Studies show, "The fact that Trump delegated much [less] social media work to professionals than either of the Obama campaigns and the 2016 Clinton campaign meant that his candidate image on social media was much closer to his self-presentation. To a degree, Trump therefore came across as more consistent an authentic compared to Clinton, [an] image that was strengthened by his position as a newcomer in politics."

Digital technology is shaping the new age of electoral politics, rather than "breaking" it; and it is creating a more transparent view and perspective of electoral politics for the voter. Digital technology allows people to publish information that could be faulty and unreliable but could be taken seriously and shift political opinion, thus possibly leading to an unfit politician being elected to office. Furthermore, digital technology can also be used to exploit the lack of quality journalism, as it can be used for political manipulation through the use of "trolls and bots, disguised as ordinary citizens, [have become] a weapon of choice for governments and political leaders to shape online conversations. Governments in Turkey, China, Israel, Russia and the United Kingdom are known to have deployed thousands of hired social media operatives who run multiple accounts to shift or control public opinion." this political manipulation may also come in another form, in which they are facilitated by said platforms due to financial support from advertisers, this can create false or targeted advertising campaigns that aim to manipulate voter thinking. These tactics may be used by officials up for election to boost campaign support or by an outside actor, such as a foreign government supporting a politician or a party that would benefit them internationally, directly manipulating political thought within society.

== Leapfrog democracies ==
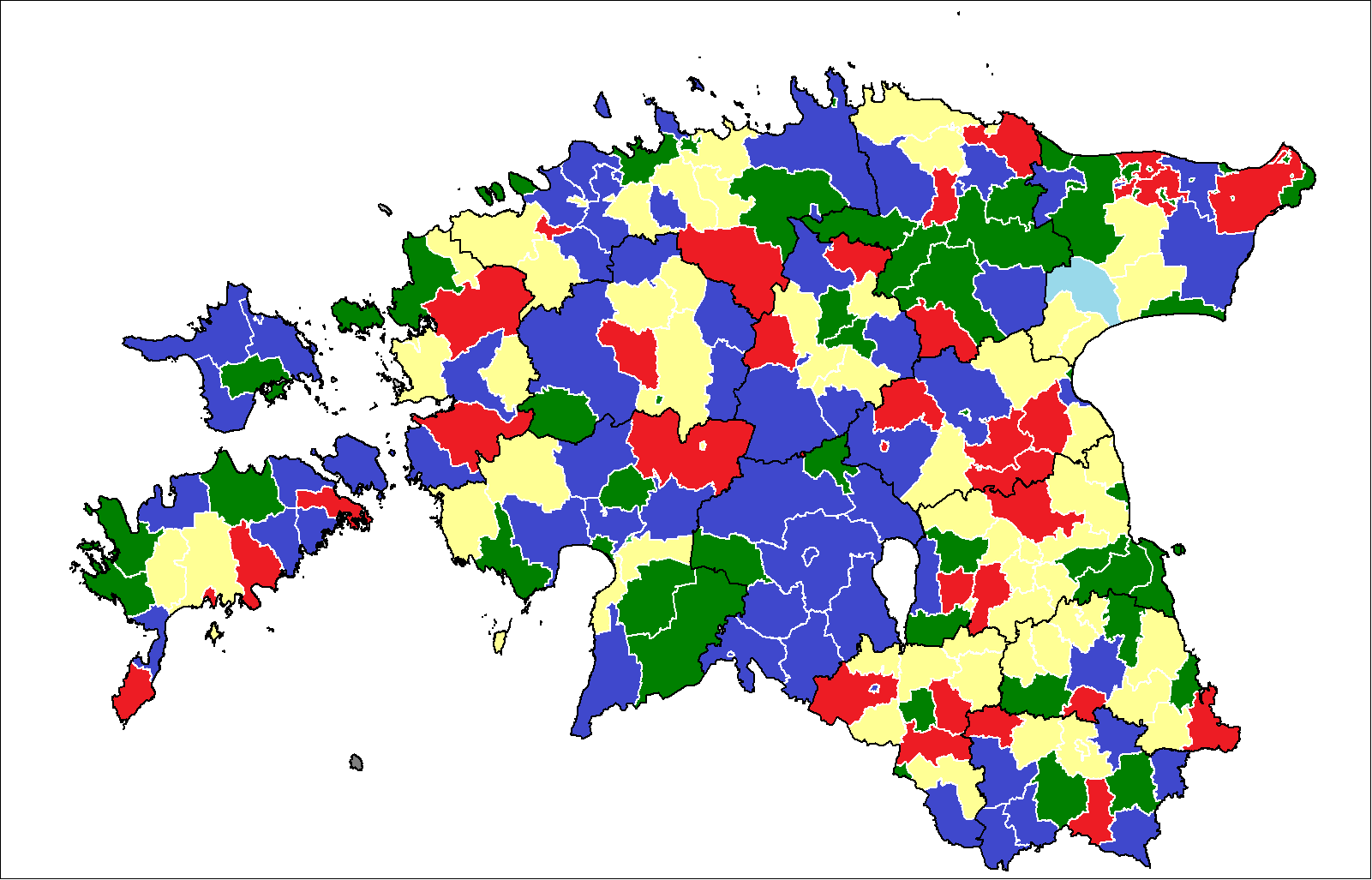
This is the divide of the different political parties in Estonia where in the 2013 elections, over 133,000 people (roughly 21.2% of participating voters) voted over the Internet. The 2013 elections were also the first elections to allow vote verification with mobile devices.

'Leapfrogging' originally denoted those societies that—through possibly radical, but even small and incremental, innovation—experience enormous development in the fields of industrial organization and economic growth and "leapfrog" once dominant rivals. It was a term first used at the Personal Democracy Forum in 2014. The term can be applied to a country's governmental institutions, the country thus becoming a "leapfrog democracy".

=== Tunisia ===
An example of this is the new Tunisian constitution. Learning from America and other countries, Tunisia developed a constitution that provides more rights than typical constitutions about issues concerning climate change, healthcare, women's rights, and workers' rights. They have provided rights that the United States' government does not guarantee its citizens. Tunisia has set the stage for many other countries to follow in their footsteps, including Egypt, Libya, Yemen, and Syria. Although these countries' attempts at democratic government have not been nearly as successful as Tunisia's.

=== Estonia ===
Another example of a leapfrog democracy is Estonia, which became one of the first countries to employ online voting. Nearly 99% of their public services are available online, and a reported 44% of Estonia citizens use them. Electronic voting in Estonia has been in place since 2005, and a citizen can cast their vote through an app on their mobile device. Through Estonia's national ID infrastructure, National ID cards can perform cryptographic functions to authenticate citizens' access to different websites and place legally binding signatures on documents, if needed. These cards work through the use of two different RSA key pairs. However, there are still some drawbacks to this voting process, as inadequate procedural controls are inexplicably changed or are not followed, lax operational security, and insufficient transparency. These weaknesses can allow for client-side attacks on the voting system.

Additionally, in 2014, Estonia became the first country to introduce an e-Residency program, with the intention of “[creating] a worldwide virtual business environment, where people from both the developed and developing countries can easily become entrepreneurs and start doing business anywhere in the world.” This program allows individuals from across the globe to digitally apply for Estonian citizenship by simply filling out an online application form and passing a background check.

== Presence of online tools for political participation ==
With the increasing use of technology in the political sphere, many new platforms and apps have emerged to provide unbiased information to the general public in a manner that is accessible to all. Many of these apps hope to be able to spread this information so that voters may be more informed about politics and make more informed decisions when voting. Some examples are Liquid.us, Countable, Capitol Bells, Fiscalnote, and Councilmatic. Technology is progressing rapidly to making a significant impact on future campaigns. A comparison of civic technology platforms highlights the similarities and differences between different online tools used for political participation.

=== iSideWith ===
iSideWith is an application that seeks to provide voters with an educated guess of who they would politically side with. They have an in-depth survey on their website that asks about the users' political opinion on common issues currently discussed within the government, to give the voter a ranking of which politician best aligns with their political stance. The more time the voters spend filling out the survey, the more accurate the results will align with their political stance. The application is available in multiple countries, such as the United States, Canada, India, Brazil, Japan, the United Arab Emirates, and Indonesia.

=== Change.org ===
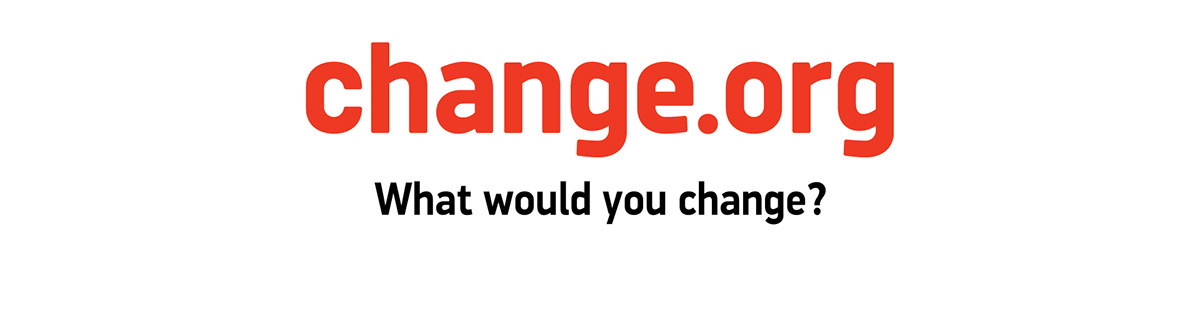
The logo and slogan for change.org

Change.org is a website that allows people to take a stance on something they agree or disagree with and actually petition for others to rally behind their cause. People can search for existing petitions concerning a cause that they feel strongly about, or they have the option of starting their own. The website displays past successful petitions that have made an impact. The petition does not necessarily have to be related to politics. There are many surveys that could be targeting different issues within their neighborhood but can range up to a social issue that they believe the whole world should be aware about.

=== D21 ===
D21 is a platform that allows people to participate in voting on issues through a form of "modern democracy". It is also known as the D21 – Janeček method, which allows people to cast both a negative and a positive vote. The platform is used mainly in the Czech Republic to target corruption within the Czech government. Though it has not yet been used in any general elections, D21 – Janeček method has been used in several participatory budgeting programs around the world, including New York City, in the United States. The Czech government introduced the game Prezident 21, which is an interactive website created to aid people in familiarizing themselves with the D21 system.

=== Democracy Earth ===
Democracy Earth is a nonprofit startup with the goal of improving voting systems by utilizing the blockchain. When faced with criticisms and concerns about the financial aspects of the vote token, Siri explains that Democracy Earth plans to mint a maximum of 500 million tokens, each priced at 12 cents, therefore spawning a $60 million market. Current plans within Democracy Earth call for employees to be compensated in the form of these vote tokens.

=== LabHacker ===
An example of LegisTech is LabHacker, a laboratory that uses data analysis to track hotly debated topics in the Brazilian parliament and publicly presents the data to keep citizens and other government officials informed. It is an initiative directed by Walternor Brandão under the auspices of the Brazilian Chamber of Deputies. LabHacker embraces 5 main "pillars" or ideals: participation, transparency, experimentation, collaboration, and inspiration.

== See also ==
- Automate This
- Cultural lag
- Digital rights
- E-democracy
- E-government
- Electronic voting
- The End of Work
- Fully Automated Luxury Communism
- Hashtag activism
- Internet activism
- Internet censorship
- Internet freedom
- Inventing the Future: Postcapitalism and a World Without Work
- Media activism
- Neo-Luddism
- Netizen
- Online deliberation
- Online petition
- Post-work society
- Public hypersphere
- The Right to Be Lazy
- Right to repair
- Technocracy
- Technogaianism
- Technology policy
- Techno-progressivism
- The War on Normal People
