= Modern rhetoric =

Modern rhetoric has gone through many changes since the age of ancient Rome and Greece to fit the societal demands of the time. Kenneth Burke, who is largely credited for defining the notion of modern rhetoric, described modern rhetoric as

"rooted in an essential function of language itself, a function that is wholly realistic, and is continually born anew; the use of language as a symbolic means of inducing cooperation in beings that by nature respond to symbols."

Burke's theory of rhetoric directed attention to the division between classical and modern rhetoric. The intervention of outside academic movements, such as structuralism, semiotics, and critical theory, made important contributions to a modern sense of rhetorical studies.

== Support and criticism ==
Some critics disagree with a changing definition of rhetoric, including Brian Vickers, who argued that modern rhetoric demeans classical rhetoric: "It first reduces its scope, and then applies it to purposes that it never dreamt of." He also critiques Burke's writing on modern rhetoric, saying it is, "A [rhetorical] system that rearranges the components of classical rhetoric so idiosyncratically as to be virtually unusable."

Kenneth Burke was heavily influenced by modern social stratification and the way symbols allow social unification and polarization, particularly in A Rhetoric of Motives. Burke sees these social changes as a social drama, acted out in rhetorical performance. Burke also employs Freudian principles in his works on modern rhetoric. He highlights the importance of modern psychology, where identification of the audience plays a key role. The principle of identification, as Burke explains, is the speaker appealing to the audience's opinions and ideals. Identification is crucial for modern rhetorical study and the principal of constitutive rhetoric.

== Other influences ==
A significant event, deemed the "linguistic turn," drastically changed how modern rhetoric was theorized and practiced. The linguistic turn linked different areas of study by their common concern for symbol-systems in shaping the way humans interpret the world and create meaning. Interpreting the world and creating meaning is the basis for Richard E. Vatz's "Myth of the Rhetorical Situation," Philosophy and Rhetoric, Summer: 1973 and The Only Authentic Book of Persuasion, Kendall Hunt, 2012, 2013. This is a change from the traditional understanding of words being labels for ideas and concepts, to the notion of language constituting social reality.

The public sphere was studied by scholars such as Jürgen Habermas and Gerard A. Hauser. Jürgen Habermas described the public sphere as the sphere of private people coming together as a public that is accessible by all, to openly discuss the general rules governing society. Gerard Hauser described the public sphere differently in terms of rhetoric. Hauser explained it to be formed by the dialogue surrounding issues, emphasizing how the members of society that engage in the dialogue were the components of the public sphere. The public sphere grows by attaining more members who will engage in the vernacular. Hauser's definition of the rhetorical public sphere still shares the notion of open debate and accessibility, assuming that the participants are actively engaged in the discourse.

== Conclusion ==
Some scholars that support the notion of modern rhetoric offer normative models that differ from classical rhetoric. Modern rhetorical study, some say, should stress two-way communication based on mutual trust and understanding to improve the speaker's ability to persuade. Acknowledging that all communication and symbols are rhetorical, scholars of the field also call for a continued expansion of the objects of study, in order to improve communicative practices and bring about more egalitarian speech.
