= Fanie =

Fanie is a South African male given name. Notable people with this name include:

- Fanie Eloff (1885–1947), South African sculptor
- Fanie Lombaard (born 1969), South African athlete
- Fanie de Jager (born 1949), South African operatic tenor
- Fanie de Villiers (born 1964), South African cricket player
- Fanie du Plessis (1930–2001), South African discus thrower and shot putter
- Fanie du Toit, South African politician
- Fanie van der Merwe (born 1986), South African athlete
