= Doxtader =

Doxtader is a surname. Notable people with the surname include:

- Erik Doxtader, an American rhetorician
- Harry Doxtader (born 1827), an American politician
- John Doxtader (1760–1801), a Loyalist during the American Revolution
- Han Yerry (1724–1794), also known as Honyery Doxtator, Oneida war chief during the American Revolution
