= Claude Ake Visiting Chair =

Research programme in Uppsala, Sweden

The Claude Ake Visiting Chair in Uppsala, Sweden, is a research programme for senior scholars with professorial competence from African universities, specialised in areas like peace, conflict resolution, human rights and democracy. The programme was co-founded in 2003 by the Nordic Africa Institute and the Department of Peace and Conflict Research at Uppsala University, who are also co-financing it.

Only one person at a time can hold the Claude Ake Visiting Chair and the chair holder is offered a three-month stay in Uppsala to pursue his or her own research, with opportunities for lecturing, holding seminars and taking part in ongoing research activities at both institutions. The visiting chair is also contracted to publish an academic paper to be published in the Open Access series Claude Ake Memorial Papers.

The Claude Ake Visiting Chair was set up in 2003 in honour of the memory of Nigerian political scientist Claude Ake (1939–1996). The idea of setting up a chair in his name was first raised by political scientist Guy Martin, already immediately after Claude Ake's sudden and untimely death.

== Current and previous holders of the Claude Ake Visiting Chair ==
- 2003: L. Adele Jinadu, Executive Director of the Centre for Advanced Social Science (CASS), in Port Harcourt, Nigeria.
- 2004: Cyril I. Obi, Associate Research Professor at the Nigerian Institute of International Affairs and Senior Research Fellow/Programme Coordinator at the Nordic Africa Institute, Uppsala.
- 2005: Amadu Sesay, Head of the Department of International Relations, Obafemi Awolowo University, Ife-Ife, Nigeria.
- 2006: Kwame Boafo-Arthur, Head of the Department of Political Science, University of Ghana, Legon.
- 2007: Charles Villa-Vicencio, Professor Emeritus at the University of Cape Town and Executive Director of the Institute for Justice and Reconciliation (IJR), Cape Town.
- 2008: Adam Azzain Mohamed, Director of the Institute for the Study of Public Administration and Federal Governance at the University of Khartoum, the Sudan.
- 2009: Yashpal Tandon, Executive Director of the South Centre in Geneva.
- 2010: Yacob Arsano, Associate Professor of Political Science and International Relations at Addis Ababa University, Ethiopia.
- 2012: Pamela Mbabazi, Associate Professor of Development studies at Mbarara University of Science and Technology, Mbarara, Uganda.
- 2013: Victor Adetula, Professor of International Relations and Development Studies at the University of Jos, Nigeria and Head of Division of Africa and Regional Integration at the Nigerian Institute of International Affairs, Lagos.
- 2014: Maxi Schoeman, Head of Department of Political Sciences and Professor of International Relations at University of Pretoria, South Africa.
- 2015: Pumla Gobodo-Madikizela, Senior research professor for trauma, forgiveness and reconciliation at the University of the Free State, and former professor of psychology at the University of Cape Town, South Africa.
- 2016: Tim Murithi, Extraordinary Professor of African Studies, at the Centre for African Studies, University of Free State, South Africa and Head of the Justice and Reconciliation in Africa Programme at the Institute for Justice and Reconciliation, in Cape Town, South Africa.
- 2017: Rachid Tlemçani, Professor, Political Science and International Relations Department, University of Algiers, Algeria.
- 2018: Heidi Hudson, Professor of International Relations and Director of the Centre for Africa Studies at the University of the Free State, Bloemfontein, South Africa.
- 2019: Eghosa E. Osaghae, Professor of Comparative Politics at University of Ibadan, Ibadan, Nigeria.
- 2020 and 2021: Cancelled due to the COVID-19 pandemic.
- 2022: Kwesi Aning, Professor and Director, Faculty of Academic Affairs and Research (FAAR), Kofi Annan International Peacekeeping Training Centre, Accra, Ghana.
- 2023: Shola Omotola, Professor of Comparative Politics at the Federal University Oye Ekiti (FUOYE).
- 2024: Nick Mdika Tembo, Professor of English in the Department of Literary Studies at the University of Malawi.
- 2025: Akosua Adomako Ampofo, Professor of African and gender studies at the Institute of African Studies, University of Ghana.
