= Erik Doxtader =

Rhetoric professor

- Born: Fort Collins, Colorado

Education
- Education: University of Kansas (B.A.); Northwestern University (M.A., (Ph.D.)

Philosophical work
- Era: 20th-/21st-century rhetoric
- Region: rhetoric
- Institutions: University of California, Berkeley; University of North Carolina, Chapel Hill; University of Wisconsin - Madison; University of South Carolina; Institute for Justice and Reconciliation
- Main interests: critical theory; rhetorical theory; theology; philosophy of rhetoric; political theory; continental philosophy; transitional justice; reconciliation; theology; German idealism; human rights

Erik Doxtader (1966-2025), was a scholar of rhetoric and critical theory. Born in Fort Collins, Colorado, Doxtader took a BA at the University of Kansas and both an MA and Ph.D. from the Department of Communication Studies at Northwestern University.

== Career ==
Doxtader was a professor in the Department of English at the University of South Carolina, and an editor of Philosophy & Rhetoric, an international quarterly journal published by the Pennsylvania State University Press. Prior to assuming the editorship in 2018, he served as the journal's Book Review Editor from 2005-2017.

Doxtader was a former Senior Research Fellow at the Institute for Justice and Reconciliation, a recognized non-governmental organization in Cape Town, South Africa. In 1999, he was awarded a 2000-2001 fellowship in the SSRC-MacArthur program in Peace and Security in a Changing World. His book, With Faith in the Works of Words: The Beginnings of Reconciliation in South Africa, received the 2010 Rhetoric Society of America book award.

== Books ==
=== Monograph ===
- Doxtader, Erik (2009). With faith in the works of words: the beginnings of reconciliation in South Africa, 1985-1995. East Lansing: Michigan State University Press. ISBN 978-0-87013-851-5. OCLC 235946025. (Note: Review of With Faith in the Works of Words: The Beginnings of Reconciliation in South Africa, 1985-1995: Dixon, Maria A. Rhetoric and Public Affairs 14, no. 3 (2011): 562-565. doi:10.1353/rap.2011.0023. JSTOR 41940558.)

=== Edited volumes ===
- Charles Villa-Vicencio; Erik Doxtader; Ebrahim Moosa, eds. (2015). The African renaissance and the Afro-Arab spring: a season of rebirth?. Washington, DC. ISBN 978-1-62616-198-6. OCLC 910326527. (Note: Reviews of The African Renaissance and the Afro-Arab Spring: A Season of Rebirth: Siddiqui, Fazzur Rahman. Insight on Africa 9, no. 1 (2017): 76-79. doi:10.1177/0975087816674572.; Fulton, R.M. CHOICE: Current Reviews for Academic Libraries 53, no. 9 (2016): 1389-1390. Gale In Context: Biography (accessed September 10, 2022). https://link.gale.com/apps/doc/A453288604/BIC?u=colu68650&sid=bookmark-BIC&xid=f0e187f0.)
- Fanie Du Toit, Erik Doxtader, ed. (2010). In the balance: South Africans debate reconciliation. Auckland Park, South Africa: Jacana Media. ISBN 978-1-77009-837-4. OCLC 662406432.
- Erik Doxtader, ed. (2009). Inventing the potential of rhetorical culture: the work and legacy of Thomas B. Farrell. University Park, Pa.: Pennsylvania State University Press. ISBN 978-0-271-03627-4. OCLC 427644787.
- Erik Doxtader; Philippe Joseph Salazar, eds. (2007). Truth and Reconciliation in South Africa: The Fundamental Documents. Cape Town: David Philip and New Africa Books. (Note: Review of Truth and Reconciliation in South Africa: The Fundamental Documents: Haron, Muhammed. African Studies Quarterly 11, no. 4 (2010): 129-131. Gale Academic OneFile, link.gale.com/apps/doc/A237453624/AONE?u=anon~6b981594&sid=bookmark-AONE&xid=28c75e19.)
- Charles Villa-Vicencio; Erik Doxtader; Richard Goldstone, eds. (2004). Pieces of the puzzle: keywords on reconciliation and transitional justice. Cape Town, South Africa: Institute for Justice and Reconciliation. ISBN 0-9584794-5-3. OCLC 59757722.
- Erik Doxtader, Philippe Joseph Salazar, ed. (2007). Truth & reconciliation in South Africa: the fundamental documents. Claremont, South Africa: New Africa Books. ISBN 978-0-86486-707-0. OCLC 184983013.
- Erik Doxtader, Charles Villa-Vicencio, ed. (2004). To repair the irreparable: reparation and reconstruction in South Africa. Claremont: David Philip Publishers. ISBN 0-86486-618-6. OCLC 60777028.
- Charles Villa-Vicencio, Erik Doxtader, ed. (2003). The provocations of amnesty: memory, justice, and impunity. Trenton, NJ: Africa World Press. ISBN 1-59221-089-9. OCLC 51637703. (Note: Review of The Provocations of Amnesty: Memory, Justice and Impunity: Verdoolaege, Annelies. Canadian Journal of African Studies 38, no. 1 (2004): 218-221. doi:10.2307/4107296. JSTOR 4107296. "Post-Apartheid South Africa III: Debating Amnesty". Journal of Southern African Studies 31, no. 2 (2005): 472–473. JSTOR 25065014.)
- Erik Doxtader, Charles Villa-Vicencio, ed. (2003). Through fire with water: the roots of division and the potential for reconciliation in Africa (1st ed.). Trenton, NJ: Africa World Press. ISBN 1-59221-083-X. OCLC 51446663. (Note: Reviews of Through Fire with Water: The Roots of Division and the Potential for Reconciliation in Africa: Harbeson, John W. African Studies Review 48, no. 2 (2005): 189-190. doi:10.1353/arw.2005.0061. JSTOR 20065126.; du Plessis, Anton. Strategic Review for Southern Africa 25, no. 1 (2003): 135.)
