= Claude Ake =

Nigerian political scientist (1939–1996)

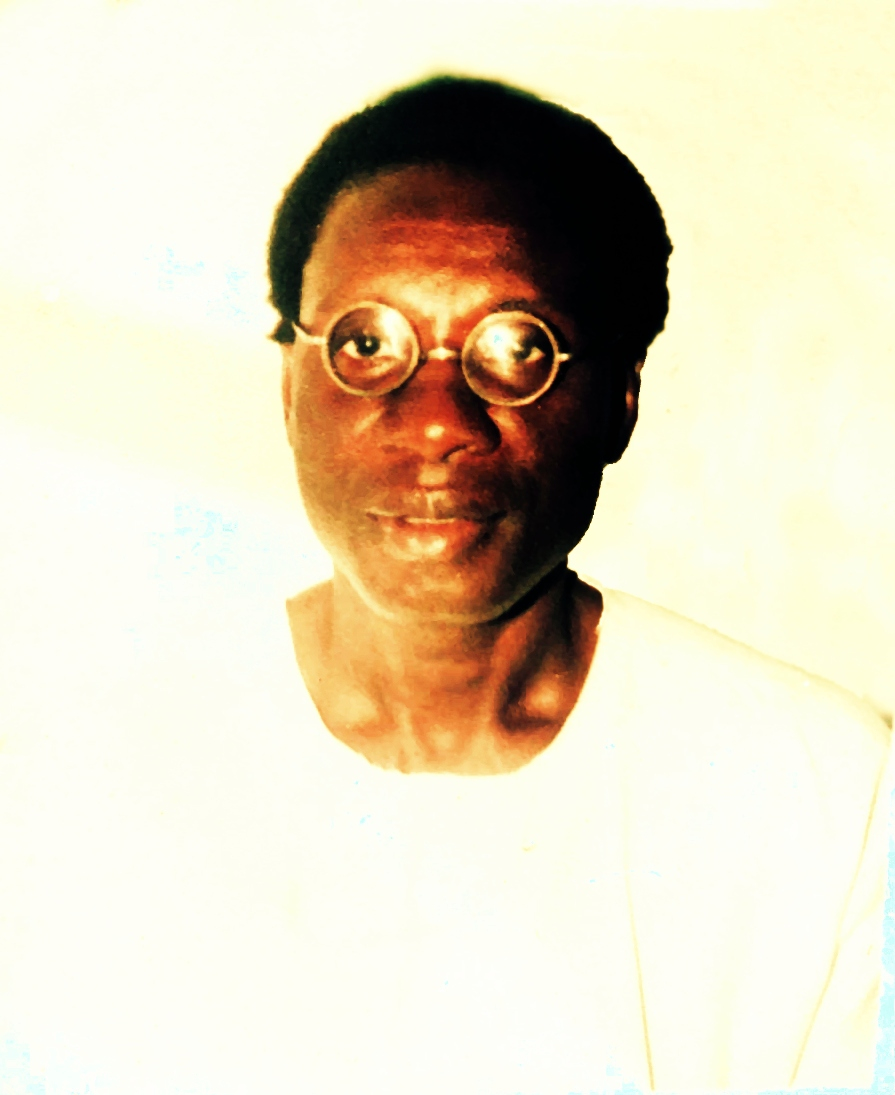
- Late Prof. Claude Ake

Personal details
- Born: 18 February 1939 Omoku, Southern Region, British Nigeria (Rivers State, Nigeria)
- Died: 7 November 1996 (aged 57) Lagos, Lagos State, Nigeria
- Spouse: Anita Ake (m. 1985)
- Children: Mela Ake; Ibra Ake; Brieri Ake
- Occupation: Dean of the University of Port Harcourt

Claude Ake (18 February 1939 in Omoku – 7 November 1996) was a Nigerian political scientist from Omoku, in Rivers State, Nigeria. Ake (pronounced AH-kay) was considered "one of Africa's foremost political philosophers." He specialized in political economy, political theory, and development studies and is well known for his research on development and democracy in Africa. He was professor of political economy and dean of the University of Port Harcourt's Faculty of Social Sciences for some years in the 1970s and 1980s after having taught at Columbia University, where he earned his Ph.D. in 1966. He held various academic positions at institutions around the world, including at Yale University (United States), University of Nairobi (Kenya), University of Dar es Salaam (Tanzania) and University of Port Harcourt (Nigeria). He was active in Nigerian politics, a critic of corruption and authoritarian rule in Africa. His permanent home was in Port Harcourt.

== Academic career ==
Before becoming a dean at Port Harcourt, he taught at universities in Canada, Kenya and Tanzania. Afterward, he held a variety of posts, at the African Journal of Political Economy, on the Social Sciences Council of Nigeria, and elsewhere.

At Yale, he taught two political science courses—one, called State in Africa, which was for undergraduates and graduate students, and another for undergraduates, about aspects of development and the state in Africa. While teaching at Yale he lived in temporary quarters on the Yale campus.

He wrote in 1985, in an essay on the African state: "Power is everything, and those who control the coercive resources use it freely to promote their interests." George Bond, the director of the Institute of African Studies at Columbia University's School of International Public Affairs, said: "He was one of the pre-eminent scholars on African politics and a scholar-activist concerned with the development of Africa. His concern was primarily with the average African and how to improve the nature of his conditions."

David E. Apter of Yale said of Ake: "In the very short time he was here, he developed a following among the students, both graduate and undergraduate, which was truly extraordinary. There were graduate students who wept at his death. Everyone was really shocked. It was an amazing testimonial to the man." Apter said that Ake had "crackling intelligence and an outspokenly severe view of African politics and nevertheless, underneath that, a quality of understanding which was remarkably subtle and complex. But he was able to communicate the complexity in a straightforward manner." He added that Ake "was not only, in my view, the top African political scientist, but an extraordinarily courageous person. The Nigerian Government was often at odds with him, and nevertheless, they recognized his stature."

== Later life, and death ==
On 16 November 1995 Ake resigned from the Steering Committee of the Niger Delta Environmental Survey, doing so to protest the execution of a minority rights activist, Ken Saro-Wiwa. Ake was a critic of Shell and the oil industry. He is quoted as saying, "In Nigeria, companies like Shell are struggling between greed and fear."

In 1991 Ake founded and became the director of the Center for Advanced Social Science, headquartered in Port Harcourt. The center is a think-tank for social and environmental research. It also played a practical role, functioning in the early 1990s as an honest broker concerning oil revenues and environmental issues between local officials and representatives of several minority groups in the oil-producing area in southeastern Nigeria.

Ake was one of 144 people killed when ADC Airlines Flight 86 between Port Harcourt and Lagos in Nigeria crashed. The plane was operated by a local airline, Aviation Development Company (ADC Airlines). His death was widely believed to have been orchestrated by the then military junta of Gen. Sani Abacha, of whom Ake was an uncompromising critic. This is in addition to the fact that Ake was a mentor to the slain author Ken Saro-Wiwa and a brain behind the Ogoni agitations against exploitation. His survivors included his wife, Anita, and three sons: Mela, Ibra and Brieri. His son Ibra Ake is a Grammy Award winner and renowned creative director, most popular for directing the video for "This Is America" by Childish Gambino.

== Claude Ake Visiting Chair at Uppsala University ==
In 2003 the Claude Ake Visiting Chair was set up at the Department of Peace and Conflict Research at Uppsala University, in collaboration with the Nordic Africa Institute, to honour the Ake's memory. The Chair is open to social scientists researching at African universities on issues related to war, peace, conflict resolution, human rights, democracy and development on the African continent.

== Selected works ==
- Social Sciences as Imperialism (1979)
- Revolutionary Pressures in Africa (1978)
- A Political Economy of Africa (1981)
- The Unique Case of African democracy, International Affairs, April 1993.
- Democracy and Development in Africa (1996)
- The Feasibility of Democracy in Africa (2000 - published posthumously)https://www.nytimes.com/1996/11/19/world/claude-ake-57-nigerian-scholar-and-activist.html
