= SA Flyer =

South African aviation magazine

SA Flyer is a South African aviation magazine published monthly in Johannesburg. The publication was founded in 1995 by Mike De Villiers and Mario Vergottini with the magazine's edition 1 released in July 1995. It was purchased by Guy Leitch in 2006 who has been running the magazine since.

Aimed at aircraft owners and pilots, there is a strong focus on safety which is reflected by the training-dedicated articles, anecdotal accounts of in-flight emergencies and accident reports. The magazine is generally composed of news, columns, featured articles, market-place listings, fly-in or airshow reports and sometimes a supplement featuring a popular aerodrome in South Africa.

FlightCom is also a South African magazine released in association with SA Flyer. FlightCom has been used as a vehicle to cover all aspects of the Aviation Industry in Africa and the Middle East. Consequently, it has a much broader scope and is very often focused on larger aircraft and airline operations. As part of SA Flyer, FlightCom now offers a quality magazine to cover the aviation events occurring in Africa and the Middle East.

== Circulation ==
=== SA Flyer ===
SA Flyer has a proven Audit Bureau of Circulations (ABC) audited circulation throughout Africa and is consequently, and by far, Africa's biggest selling aviation magazine.

=== FlightCom ===
In addition to the exposure received by FlightCom as a part of SA Flyer, it is further distributed to over 1500 key decision makers in African Aviation. These include Airline CEOs, Airline Chief Pilots and Heads of Flight operations, Heads of Corporate Flight departments, Civil Aviation Authorities, Heads of Air Forces, Heads of Armed Forces, Logistics Chiefs of Staff, Embassies and Consulates, Trade Delegations, Charter Companies, Flying Schools and Maintenance Organisations.

== Notable Contributors ==
=== SA Flyer ===
- Guy Leitch (All things aviation)
- Peter Garrison (Technical information on how planes fly)
- Jim Davis (Training and humorous aviation stories)
- John Bassi (Helicopter Ops)
- Ray Watts (Aircraft register)
- Chris Martinus (AOPA Briefing)

=== FlightCom ===
- Mike Gough (Airline Ops and lessons as a flight instructor)
- Hugh Pryor (Bush Flying in Africa)
- Philippe-Joseph Salazar (Legal Eagle)
