= Philippe-Joseph Salazar =

French philosopher (born 1955)

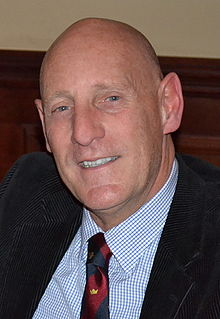
- Philippe-Joseph Salazar, 2011
- Born: 10 February 1955 (age 71); Casablanca

Education
- Education: École Normale Supérieure

Philosophical work
- Institutions: University of Cape Town, Collège international de philosophie
- Main interests: rhetoric

Philippe-Joseph Salazar (French: [salazaʁ]; born 10 February 1955) is a French rhetorician and philosopher,

== Early life ==
Salazar was born on 10 February 1955 in Casablanca, then part of French Morocco. Salazar attended the Lycée Louis-le-Grand secondary-school in Paris before studying philosophy, politics and literature at the École Normale Supérieure. Since 1999, Salazar is a Distinguished Professor in Rhetoric in the Faculty of Law at the University of Cape Town, South Africa. Salazar's lifelong achievements made him the recipient of Africa's premier research award in 2008, the Harry Oppenheimer Fellowship Award. In 2015 he received a prestigious French literary prize for political non-fiction, Prix Bristol des Lumières, for his book on the rhetoric of jihadism: Paroles armées (2015; English title: Words are Weapons. Inside ISIS's Rhetoric of Terror).

== From voice to rhetoric ==
Salazar's advisor at Ecole Normale Supérieure was Louis Althusser. While at ENS he joined the Conférence Olivaint, an exclusive club dedicated to training future leaders in the Catholic and liberal tradition of public oratory, and completed a voluntary internship at the cultural affairs section of Paris City Hall when President Chirac was mayor.

Salazar would later pursue graduate studies in metaphysics (on metaphor and ontology) with Emmanuel Levinas, in semiotics (on voice) with Roland Barthes and in political theory with Maurice Duverger. Lacanian psychoanalyst and film theorist Anna Guédy of École Freudienne de Paris further influenced his academic career (lectures on film and voice in Paris), which led to a collaboration to critical theory journal La Cause Freudienne edited by Jacques Lacan and Jacques-Alain Miller. Early friendships with French avant-garde actor Serge Merlin and professor of declamation (in the tradition of Sarah Bernhardt) Pierre Spivakoff deepened his understanding of voice. He began contributing extensive articles on voice, opera and psycho-analysis, to leading journal Avant-Scène Opera (from 1977 to 1984). On Maria Callas' death (1977) French far-left daily Libération (founded by Jean-Paul Sartre) asked Salazar to write her obituary.

At the prompting of both his philosophy advisor Louis Althusser and French sociologist Georges Balandier, Salazar travelled to apartheid South Africa in 1978 to undertake field-research on racial rhetoric, which led to a first doctoral dissertation in social and cultural anthropology at the Sorbonne University in Paris. The examination copy of his dissertation was blocked by the South African Security Police but sneaked out of the Apartheid state via diplomatic pouch (see preface to his bookAn African Athens and eventually published as L'Intrigue Raciale: Essai de Critique Anthropologique. He has since retained a strong interest in anthropology.

After returning to Paris, Salazar served for a while as Arts and Letters editor of controversial psycho-analytical magazine Spirales, edited by Armando Verdiglione. He published lengthy interviews with William Styron, and painter Elizabeth Franzheim, and he resumed writing on opera in Avant-Scène Opera as well as Opera International, and Lyrica (interviews of Nicolai Gedda, Mirella Freni). He wrote also in French conservative-liberal monthly Commentaire. His first book Idéologies de l'opéra (1980) is considered a breakthrough in the field of sociology and anthropology of opera. Salazar dedicated the book to his mentor, Germaine Lubin. In 1981, he published his opera Icare in Islamic poet and psychoanalyst Michel Orcel's literary journal L'Alphée and contributed to Philippe Sollers's famed avant-garde journal L'Infini at the prompting of novelist Dominique Rolin. He has since retained an interest in opera as a social form of knowledge (2000, keynote speaker of cross-cultural event Carmen 2000, SoBe, Miami, and co-founded Espacio Cultural Triangular with New York photographer Ruben Roncallo).

This intersectional interest in anthropology, philosophy and political theory led him to engage with a newly re-emerging field, rhetoric.

In the 1980s Salazar's senior doctorate advisor and Balzan Prize laureate Marc Fumaroli had reshaped the field of rhetoric studies in regard of French literary and political culture (Fumaroli shows how High Church rhetoric and its institutions had been appropriated by a centralized monarchy and then a secularized Republic). Since the late 1980s Fumaroli's work, in Paris, in Italy and at the University of Chicago, has been decisive in the reshaping of cultural studies from a non, if not anti structuralism and deconstruction approach. Salazar's senior dissertation (or Doctorat d'Etat) concerned itself with oral culture in the French classical age and it remains to this day a reference work on the topic as Le Culte de la Voix au 17e Siècle). The book is dedicated to the memory of Roland Barthes and Georges Dumézil who had both encouraged him to make "voice" his very own scholarly project. In 1993 Salazar convened at Centre culturel international de Cerisy-la-Salle, a prestigious locale for cutting edge research, a colloquium to salute Fumaroli's pioneering work in rhetoric. During this "classical" phase Salazar published or edited key documents of French cultural tradition, such as Charles Alphonse du Fresnoy's seminal De Arte Graphica( a key document of French Classicism in the fine arts), Bishop Jacques Amyot's royal lectures on oratory for King Henri III, royal preceptor and theologian Pierre Daniel Huet's Memoirs, and skeptical philosopher François de La Mothe Le Vayer, the Sun-King's teacher. Recognized as a prominent 17th century studies scholar, Salazar was appointed to a Chair at Centre d’Etudes de la Renaissance, at François Rabelais University, Tours, France in 1999. In 2000, Salazar relinquished the Tours Chair to devote his research to rhetoric as a "technology of power" in modern, public affairs. He took up an appointment as Distinguished Chair in Rhetoric and Humane Letters at the University of Cape Town, South Africa. At that time (1999) he was elected to a sought after 6-year Directorship in Rhetoric and Democracy at Jacques Derrida's Foundation, Collège international de philosophie, in Paris, extending the work done at the Centre for Rhetoric Studies, Cape Town, he founded while Dean of Arts in 1994.

== Rhetoric as a philosophy of power ==
The Centre for Rhetoric Studies at the University of Cape Town was founded with a view to study the importance of rhetoric for peaceful democracy (Mission Statement). The projects based at the Centre in Cape Town mirrored Salazar's own research chair in Paris. Both focused on rhetoric as a foundation for public life, and in post-totalitarian democracy in particular. Influential magazine Sciences Humaines praised Salazar's book Hyperpolitique for resetting rhetoric at the centre of human sciences enquiry

If Salazar's work is not unique in regard of a concern with rhetorical forms among contemporary French philosophers, its originality lies in its focus: rhetorical technologies of power in democracy, the question of reconciliation, and the practices of opinion-based, political "evil.". His work parallels that of fellow philosopher François Jullien on Chinese "manipulation" and of philologist and Heideggerian philosopher Barbara Cassin on Sophistry in Ancient Greece. Historian of the public sphere Emmanuel Lemieux ( author of Le Pouvoir Intellectuel) called him an "atypical philosopher".

Seminal works have marked Salazar's reshaping of rhetoric as the study of forms of power in contemporary democracies: Truth in Politics, Amnistier l’Apartheid (in Barbara Cassin and Alain Badiou's series Ordre Philosophique), Vérité, Réconciliation, Réparation, a collaborative book with Paul Ricoeur and Jacques Derrida), credited for having introduced in French political thought the concept of ubuntu (Edwy Plenel, Le Monde, 12/30/2004). Salazar's works also include edited volumes on Democratic Rhetoric and the Duty of Deliberation and The Rhetorical Shape of International Conflicts. In addition to his rhetorical analysis of declarations of war and a study of Nobel Prize rhetoric in his edited volume on French rhetoric and philosophy today (Philosophy and Rhetoric). His work on the rhetorical foundation of politics extends beyond Europe and Africa, with a publication on Les Slaves (2005) and a book Mahomet (2006), a study of rhetorical common places regarding the Prophet of Islam. His publications led to a sustained conversation and broadcast on forgiveness and secularism with Arab poet and philosopher Abdelwahab Meddeb in 2006. and broadcast Cultures D'Islam, 27 May 2006).

With Hyperpolitique (2009) Salazar opened a new area of investigation : rhetoric studies as philosophy of power. Le Nouvel Economiste carried a laudatory critique of the book and of its relevance for leadership studies. More recent publications, Paroles de Leaders, Décrypter le Discours des Puissants in August 2011 (François Bourin Editeur), and L'Art de séduire l'électeur indécis have placed him at the forefront of the field. Premier management quarterly L'Expansion Management Review placed Paroles de Leaders on its "Books To Read" list (September 2011). Salazar is currently engaging with covert forms of power, intelligence and surveillance studies, with a lead essay in Italian philosophy journal Lo Sguardo, an edited volume for Swiss transnational journal and think tank Cosmopolis, following a collaborative volume on Surveillance/Rhetoric (with a lead contribution by Antonio Negri).

Salazar's work has secured him a global influence in his field. He has addressed the Observatoire de la Transition démocratique et Forum de la Citoyenneté, in Rabat, Morocco, ahead of the Moroccan Equite et Réconciliation National Commission (2004). He has held the Annual Seminar in Peace and Conflict Resolution at Concordia University in Montreal, Canada. Among his signature public lectures: the Annual Lecture in Law and Literature at John Jay College of Criminal Justice, CUNY, New York; the 18th Kenneth Burke Annual Lecture at the Center for Democratic Deliberation at Penn State in which he outlined his thinking on the rhetorical foundation of political philosophy and addressed a colloquium on the U.S. presidency and its rhetoric of virtue (France Culture Lecture); the Buenos Aires Forum of Rhetoric (Conferencia de Apertura); the Balkan Summer University for young philosophers on rhetorical technologies of domination in democratic societies; in Brussels the ULB's annual public lecture on democracy and debate; in 2011 at the University of Nanking and at Yangzhou University; in 2017 at the Fondazione MAST, in Bologna, Italy; and at the Berlin literature festival Haus für Poesie. Salazar has extended the scope of rhetorical critique to Marxism in avant-garde journals Consecutio Temporum and Transeuropéennes.

As a public intellectual Salazar has appeared on Sud-Radio, France-Culture, French C-Span: Public-Senat. and notably TV5 Monde. He has written for Le Figaro, L'Express, Le Point, Le Nouvel Observateur,Atlantico., Causeur and Valeurs Actuelles. He appears regularly on the Rachel Marsden show,on Sputnik (news agency) radio in French. He contributes to the publications of the French Centre for Intelligence Studies and a Defense and Security studies site. In addition to his regular chronicles for online culture newsmagazine Les Influences as Le rhéteur cosmopolite and Comment raisonnent-ils?, and blogs at Yale Books Unbound.

His award-winning book, Paroles armées, has received international praise. It is a full-scale analysis of the Islamic State's propaganda and rhetorical strategies of influence (published in five languages). On the occasion of the Darmstadt premiere of Nobel Prize laureate Elfriede Jelinek's play Wut ("Rage"), on the January 2015 Paris terror attack against Charlie Hebdo by militants of the Islamic State (ISIS) excerpts of Salazar's Die Sprache des Terrors were reprinted to introduce the play. The French book received the coveted prix Bristol des Lumières (best nonfiction) a day before the November 2015 Paris Bataclan (theatre) massacre by Islamic State's militants.

His most recent book, in French (Suprémacistes, 2020), is a full scale study of key figures of the international white supremacy/white nationalism, what he calls the "white awakening" in his critical legal study essay on mass murderer Dylann Roof.

== Professional activities ==
He is Honorary Life President of the Association for Rhetoric and Communication in Southern Africa, Vice-President of the Chinese Global Society for Visual Communication, Founding and Honorary Member of the Sociedad Latinamericana de Retorica. He sits on the Editorial Board of Philosophy and Rhetoric and Javnost-The Public. He collaborates with French publisher Piranha as editorial adviser at large for foreign fiction (novels by Christopher Hope, Kazuki Sakuraba, Phil Redmond). From 2007 to 2014 he directed a series of publications on the power of rhetoric at Klincksieck (the oldest publishing house in the social sciences in France) ranging from Buddhist rhetoric (Rada Ivekovic) to Heidegger (Valerie Allen and Ares D. Axiotis), from visual eloquence (Hanno Hardt) at the time of the disintegration of Yugoslavia to Third Reich and DDR propaganda machines (Randall L. Bytwerk), from migrants' eloquence to political styles (Robert Hariman). Founder and current co-chairman of the Macmillan Club. Aviator member of the Aéro-Club de France, and author of Air Law, A Comprehensive Sourcebook For Southern African Pilots and a regular contributor to SA Flyer-African Aviation; journalist-level member of the National Press Club (USA) of Washington, and of the Owl Club. In 2022, on the occasion of the Ben Beinart Lecture at Cape Town Law school, the international community of rhetoricians presented him with a Festschrift to celebrate his forty years scholarship in rhetoric studies, The Incomprehensible: The Critical Rhetoric of Philippe-Joseph Salazar.

== Publications ==
=== Monographs and edited volumes ===
- Contre La Rhétorique. 2024. Paris. Editions du Cerf ISBN 9782204155526
- La Déroute des Idées. Appel à La Résistance. 2021. Paris: Piranha ISBN 9782371190900
- Suprémacistes. 2020. Paris: Plon.
- Air Law. 2019. Juta: Cape Town
- Grand Oral, Paris/Brussels, Genese, 2019 ISBN 979-1-0946895-23
- Words Are Weapons. Inside ISIS's Rhetoric of Terror, Yale University Press, 2017 ISBN 9780300223224
- Blabla République. Au Verbe, Citoyens. Paris: Lemieux Editeur, 2017 ISBN 9782373440836. Watch his prime time interview Grand Angle on TV5 Monde: "Au verbe, citoyens !" Un philosophe contre la langue des élites
- Palabras Armadas, Barcelona, Anagrama, 2016.
- Die Sprache des Terrors, Munich, Random House/Pantheon, 2016.
- Parole armate, Bompiani, 2016.
- Paroles Armées, Comprendre et Combattre La Propagande Terroriste, Lemieux Editeur, Paris, 2015 ISBN 978-2-37344-029-4
- Lesa Humanidad (con Claudia Hilb y Martin Lucas Eds), Katz Editores, Madrid, 2014 ISBN 978-84-15917-06-9
- Rhetoric in South America (with M A Vitale Eds), AfricaRhetoric Publisher, 2013 (eBook ISBN 978-0-620-56678-0)
- De L'Art de Séduire l'Electeur Indécis, Paris, Francois Bourin Editeur, 2012. ISBN 978-2-84941-299-2
- (Ed., with C Mihali and P. Michel) Figures de l'Etat et Institutionnalisation du Pouvoir, Cluj-Napoca, Romania, Idea and Agence Universitaire de la Francophonie, 2011. ISBN 978-973-7913-95-1
- Paroles de Leaders. Décrypter le Discours des Puissants, Paris, François Bourin, 2011.
- Under the Baobab. Essays to Honour Stuart Saunders, Cape Town, AfricaRhetoric Publishing, 2011.
- (Ed.) Gender Rhetoric: North-South, with Jairos Kangira, Windhoek, Namibia, PolyPress, 2010. ISBN 978-99945-71-30-7
- L'hyperpolitique. Une passion française, Paris, Klincksieck, 2009, 200 p. ISBN 2-252-03735-0
- (Ed.) Women's Rhetoric. Argumentative Strategies, with Brigitte Mral and Nicole Bjorg, Åstorp, Retorikförlaget, 2009. ISBN 978-91-86093-04-4
- Truth and Reconciliation in South Africa. The Fundamental Documents, with Erik Doxtader, Cape Town, New Africa Books/David Philip, 2008, 478 p. [5] (ISBN 978-0-86486-707-0). Open access
- Mahomet, Paris, Klincksieck, 2005, XXVII-390 p. (ISBN 2-252-03540-4).
- (Ed.) Adam Mickiewicz, Les Slaves, Cours du Collège de France 1842, Paris, Klincksieck, 2005, 248 p. (ISBN 2-252-03516-1).
- (Ed.) Amnistier l’apartheid, Paris, Le Seuil, 2004, 352 p, (ISBN 2-02-068604-X).
- (Ed.) François de La Mothe Le Vayer. De la patrie et des étrangers et autres traités sceptiques, Paris, Desjonquères, 2003, 336 p. (ISBN 2-84321-057-7).
- L’Art de parler. Anthologie de manuels d’éloquence, Paris, Klincksieck, 2003, 370 p. (ISBN 2-252-03438-6)
- An African Athens. Rhetoric and the Shaping of Democracy in South Africa, Mahwah, NJ/London, Lawrence Erlbaum Associates, 2002, 248 p. (ISBN 0-8058-3341-2).
- Parole démocratique. Entames rhétoriques, Paris, Collège international de philosophie, Les Papiers du Collège, 56, 2001, 54p.
- La Divine Sceptique. Éthique et rhétorique au XVIIe siècle, Tübingen, Gunter Narr Verlag, 2000, 131p. (ISBN 3-8233-5581-3)
- Afrique du Sud. La révolution fraternelle, Paris, Hermann, 1998, 121 p.(ISBN 2-7056-6360-6).
- (Ed.) Le Loisir Lettré à l'âge classique, co-Ed. with Marc Fumaroli and Emmanuel Bury, Geneva, Droz, 1996, 359 p. (ISBN 2-600-00175-1).
- Le Culte de la voix au XVIIe siècle. Formes esthétiques de la parole à l'âge de l'imprimé, Paris-Geneva, Champion-Slatkine, 1995, 408 p. (ISBN 2-85203-422-0).
- (Ed.) Afriques imaginaires, Regards réciproques et discours littéraires, XVIIe-XXe siècles, co-Ed. with Anny Wynchank, Paris, L'Harmattan, 1995, 295p. (ISBN 2-7384-3127-5).
- (Ed.) Mémoires de Pierre Daniel Huet, new edition, Paris/Toulouse, Klincksieck/SLC, 1993, 170 p. (ISBN 2-908728-13-3)
- (Ed.) Projet d'éloquence royale de Jacques Amyot, new edition, with a prefatory essay "Le Monarque orateur," Paris, Les Belles Lettres, 1992, 104 p. (ISBN 978-2-251-46001-7).
- Du Graphe, or De Arte Graphica de Charles Alphonse Du Fresnoy, translated from Latin into French, with a prefatory essay "L'institution de la peinture," Paris, L'Alphée, 1990, 98-121.
- L'intrigue raciale. Essai de critique anthropologique, Paris, Méridiens Klincksieck, 1989, 230 p. (ISBN 2-86563-211-3).
- Ideologije U Operi, Belgrade, Nolit, Muzika, 1985, 228 p. (Serbo-Croatian translation of item below).
- Idéologies de l'opéra, Paris, Presses universitaires de France, 1980, 208 p. (ISBN 2-13-036175-7).

=== Journal editorship ===
- How Does Law Communicate?, co-edited with K Kotzé PhD, Javnost-The Public, 27/4, 2020
- "A critique of surveillance", Cosmopolis /A Review of Cosmopolitics, 2015 (ISSN 2030-028X).
- Mandela (y otros) habla español, African Yearbook of Rhetoric, vol 5, 2014.
- "Rhetoric of Statecraft", African Yearbook of Rhetoric, vol 4/1, 2013 [Online ISSN 2305-7785]
- "Diplomatic Rhetoric in the South," vol 3/3, 2012.ISBN 978-0-9870334-2-0
- "Surveillance/Rhetoric", African Yearbook of Rhetoric, vol 3/1, 2011, 114 p. [ISSN 2220-2188]
- "The Great Speeches of Africa's Liberation," African Yearbook of Rhetoric, vol 2/3, 2011, 93 p. [ISSN 2220-2188]
- "Philosophy and Rhetoric in France Today", special issue of Philosophy & Rhetoric, 42(4), 2009, 114 p. (ISSN 0031-8213).
- "Trente années de recherches rhétoriques", Dix-Septième Siècle, LIX (3), no. 236, 2007, 421-426. (ISBN 978-2-13-056096-8).
- "The Rhetorical Shape of International Conflicts", Javnost-The Public, 12, 4, 2005. (ISSN 1318-3222) Online (ISSN 1854-8377).
- "Vérité, réconciliation, réparation", with Barbara Cassin and Olivier Cayla, Le Genre Humain, 43, 2004, 365 p. (ISBN 2-02-062886-4).
- "Truth in Politics", with Sanya Osha and Wim van Binsbergen, Quest. An African Journal of Philosophy/Une Revue Africaine de Philosophie, XVI (1-2), 2004, 274 p. (ISSN 1011-226X).
- "Democratic Rhetoric and The Duty of Deliberation", Javnost-The Public, 8(3), 2001, 78 p. (ISSN 1318-3222). Online (ISSN 1854-8377).
- "Institution de la parole en Afrique du Sud", Rue Descartes, 17, 1997, 178 p. (ISBN 2-13-048336-4).

=== Series Editor ===
As an Editorial Advisor At Large for Foreign Fiction, Piranha publishing house:

- Christopher Hope, Jimfish, 2017.
- Kazuki Sakuraba, La Légende des Akakuchiba, 2017.
- Phil Redmond, Retour à Highbridge, 2017.

As Director, Klincksieck publishing house:

- Valerie Allen et Ares D. Axiotis, L'art d'enseigner de Martin Heidegger, pour la Commission de dénazification, trad. de Xavier Blandi, suivi de Philippe-Joseph Salazar, Manifeste, 2007.
- Hanno Hardt, Des murs éloquents/ Eloquent Walls, 2008.
- Ralph Keysers, Cinq mots forts de la propagande nazie, 2008.
- Robert Hariman, Le Pouvoir est une question de style, trad. de Laurent Bury, 2009.
- Randall L. Bytwerk, Machines à broyer les âmes, Allemagne totalitaire 1933-1989, trad. de Laurent Bury, 2011.
- Jean-Philippe Dedieu, La parole immigrée, 2012.
- Rada Ivekovic, L'éloquence tempérée du Bouddha, 2014.
