= Marc Fumaroli =

French historian and essayist (1932–2020)

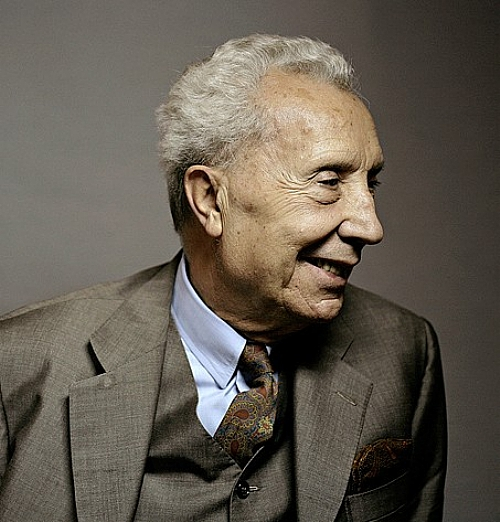
- Born: 10 June 1932; Marseille, France
- Died: 24 June 2020 (aged 88); Paris, France
- Education: Lycée Thiers; Aix-Marseille University; University of Paris
- Occupation: Historian
- Known for: Member of the Académie Française

Marc Fumaroli (10 June 1932 – 24 June 2020) was a French historian and essayist who was widely respected as an advocate for French literature and culture. While born in Marseille, Fumaroli grew up in the Moroccan city of Fez, and served in the French army during the Algerian War.

== Career ==
Following his appointment to a chair in Seventeenth Century Studies at Paris-Sorbonne University (1980), he was elected to a Chair in Rhetoric and Society in Europe (16th and 17th century) at the Collège de France. He held it from 1986 to 2002, until mandatory retirement, and was an emeritus professor. He is acknowledged for the revival of Rhetoric as field of study of European culture, in a sharp move away from both structuralism and post-modernism. His pioneering work remains L'Âge de l'éloquence (1980). In 1994, as a Voltaire scholar, he gave (in French) the British Academy's Master-Mind Lecture.

== Awards ==
Fumaroli was elected to the Académie Française on 2 March 1995 and became its director. He was also a member of the Académie des Inscriptions, the sister academy devoted to high erudition.

In 2000, Fumaroli delivered the annual A. W. Mellon Lectures in the Fine Arts. A year later, he received the prestigious Balzan Prize for literary history and criticism.

Fumaroli was a foreign member of the British Academy and of the American Philosophical Society. He was also a member of the University of Chicago's Committee on Social Thought.

Fumaroli was promoted to commander of the French Legion of Honor in 2008, after previously being named chevalier in 1993 and officer in 2002.

After his death, the office of French President Emmanuel Macron praised Fumaroli as one of the country's greatest ever storytellers and historians.

== Bibliography ==
- 1980 L’Âge de l’éloquence : rhétorique et « res literaria » de la Renaissance au seuil de l’époque classique (Droz)
- 1985 Présentation et commentaire de La Fontaine, Fables, Lettres françaises (Imprimerie nationale)
- 1989 Catalogue de l’exposition. L’inspiration du poète de Poussin. Essai sur l’allégorie du Parnasse (Musée du Louvre)
- 1990 Héros et orateurs, Rhétorique et dramaturgie cornéliennes (Droz); Fumaroli, Marc (1996). 2^{e} édition. Librairie Droz. ISBN 9782600005012.
- 1990 « La période 1600-1630 », in Précis de littérature française du XVIIe siècle, edited by Jean Mesnard (PUF)
- 1991 L’État culturel, essai sur une religion moderne (Le Fallois)
- 1994 L’École du silence (Flammarion)
- 1994 Trois institutions littéraires (Gallimard)
- 1994 La Diplomatie de l’esprit, de Montaigne à La Fontaine (Hermann)
- 1996 Le Loisir lettré à l’âge classique (Droz) (edited by Marc Fumaroli, Emmanuel Bury and Philippe-Joseph Salazar)
- 1997 Le Poète et le Roi. Jean de La Fontaine en son siècle (Le Fallois)
- 1998 L'Art de la conversation, edited by Marc Fumaroli, Anthologie de Jacqueline Hellegouarc'h (Garnier)
- 1999 Histoire de la rhétorique dans l'Europe moderne (edited and prefaced by Marc Fumaroli) (PUF)
- 1999 Chateaubriand et les Arts, « Ut Pictura Poesis : Chateaubriand et les Arts », recueil d'études, publié avec le soutien de la Fondation Singer-Polignac (Le Fallois)
- 2000 L'Esprit de la société, Cercle et « salons » parisiens au XVIIIe siècle, edited by Marc Fumaroli, Anthologie de Jacqueline Hellegouarc'h (Garnier)
- 2000 La Querelle des Anciens et des Modernes, précédé d'un essai "Les Abeilles et les Araignées" (Gallimard)
- 2001 L'Art de persuader, de Pascal, précédé par L'Art de conférer, de Montaigne (preface by Marc Fumaroli) (Rivages)
- 2001 Quand l'Europe parlait français (Le Fallois)
- 2001 La Diplomatie de l'esprit (Gallimard)
- 2001 Poussin, Sainte Françoise Romaine
- 2002 Richelieu : l'Art et le pouvoir, edited by Hilliard Todd Goldfarb (Musée des Beaux-Arts de Montréal)
- 2004 Chateaubriand. Poésie et Terreur (Le Fallois)
- 2006 Exercices de lecture de Rabelais à Paul Valéry (Gallimard)
- 2009 Paris-New York et retour : Voyage dans les arts et les images (Fayard)
- 2014 Le Sablier Renversé: Des Modernes aux Anciens (Gallimard)
- 2015 La République des Lettres (Gallimard)
- 2021 Dans ma bibliothèque: La guerre et la paix (Les Belles Lettres/de Fallois)

== In English ==
- 2011 : When the World Spoke French (Quand l'Europe parlait français), translated by Richard Howard (New York: New York Review of Books)
- 2018 : The Republic of Letters (La République des Lettres), translated by Lara Vergnaud (New Haven: Yale University Press)
