= Henry Johnstone Jr. =

American philosopher (1920–2000)

Henry Johnstone Jr. (1920 – 2000) was an American philosopher and rhetorician known especially for his notion of the "rhetorical wedge" and his re-evaluation of the ad hominem fallacy. He was Professor of Philosophy at Pennsylvania State University (1952–1984) and began studying Classics in the late 1970s. He was the founder and longtime editor of the journal Philosophy and Rhetoric and edited the Journal of Speculative Philosophy.

== Ad hominem ==
Ad hominem is Latin for "to the person". According to Johnstone this means arguing from the perspective of the other person one is arguing with, not from one's own perspective. This is not to be confused with the ad hominem fallacy. Ad hominem essentially allows an individual to critique from the inside out, making it easier to show the fallacies or contradictions in the other's argument. Johnstone states that by using ad hominem "the clear mind can exploit the inconsistencies of the confused one. The force of this exploitation is to invite the latter to abandon ambiguity and incoherence."

== Connection between philosophy and rhetoric ==
Early in his career, Johnstone viewed rhetoric as simply a means of deceiving the audience into believing a certain assertion made by the orator. He viewed philosophy in a more noble and truth-seeking light: "No philosopher worthy of the name would wish to secure assent to his position through techniques concealed from his audience." He believed that arguments must be tested by the criticism of colleagues, not by concealing the truth: "The philosopher is obligated to tell the truth." A few years later, he wrote that "rhetoric is relevant—highly relevant—to philosophy." Johnstone held that if man is in fact a persuading and persuadable animal, not merely a communicating one, that not using rhetoric would be similar to treating man as a computer. He stated that it could plausibly be argued that communication is likewise a degenerate form of persuasion—a form in which we report not in order to incite people to action but merely for the sake of reporting. His argument is that rhetoric is relevant to philosophy because rhetoric is a condition of human existence and that philosophy is a means by which one may be able to clarify that condition.

== Rhetoric as a wedge ==
Johnstone advanced and discussed the notion of rhetoric as "a wedge," in the sense that it serves as a tool to open a gap between the input of data and its acceptance. He wrote: "By 'a wedge', I simply mean whatever introduces such a gap." Rhetoric serves as a wedge, because it helps individuals better understand, rationalize, and make judgments. Therefore, if individuals already knew everything, there would be no need for rhetoric as a means of interpreting data. This process proceeds by a bilateral exchange of responses. Although one may not respond to the orator, one does in one's own mind and perhaps writes a critique. Johnstone makes a distinction between rhetoric as a wedge and rhetoric in a degenerate sense in the form of a command or threat. Once rhetoric degenerates to the level of commands or threats, it is no longer bilateral but unilateral, no longer making it a wedge by which one can interpret data.

Prior to his death, Johnstone, along with Mari Lee Mifsud, attempted to "supplement the notion of rhetoric as a 'wedge' by suggesting the ways in which it is, and also must be, a 'bridge'." They state that rhetoric serves as a wedge in deliberative and forensic speech, but not in epideictic. Mentioning Aristotle's advice that when the audience and speaker are already aligned in terms of a particular consciousness, the speaker need only to amplify and celebrate this consciousness, they conclude: "While this celebration is not a wedge, since it calls attention to nothing the audience did not already believe, it is a bridge."

== Impact ==
Johnstone's discussion of rhetorical and dialectical argument was viewed as being highly original, and at odds with the prevailing logical empiricism of the time. Scholars in both the fields of philosophy and rhetoric attribute to Johnstone significant advances in argumentation: "Johnstone's focus on the transaction of arguing had an immediate impact within the U.S. argumentation and debate community, directing attention to the normative aspects of controversy." His extensive work on ad hominem argumentation provoked a serious reexamination among philosophers. Many accredit him for adequately showing that ad hominem argumentation was quite typical surrounding philosophical writings, and had much broader use than previously thought.

== Books ==
- Johnstone, Henry W. (1954). Elementary deductive logic. New York: Crowell. OCLC 1816376.
- Johnstone, Henry W. (1959). Philosophy and argument. University Park, PA: Pennsylvania State University Press. OCLC 294778.
- Johnstone, Henry W., ed. (1965). What is philosophy?. Sources in philosophy. New York: Macmillan Publishers. OCLC 334967.
- Anderson, John Mueller; Johnstone, Henry W. (1962). Natural deduction: the logical basis of axiom systems. Belmont, CA: Wadsworth Publishing. OCLC 880991.
- Johnstone, Henry W. (1970). The problem of the self. University Park, PA: Pennsylvania State University Press. ISBN 027100102X. OCLC 96307.
- Johnstone, Henry W. (1978). Validity and rhetoric in philosophical argument: an outlook in transition. University Park, PA: Dialogue Press of Man & World. OCLC 3966238.
