= Barbara Cassin =

French philologist and philosopher

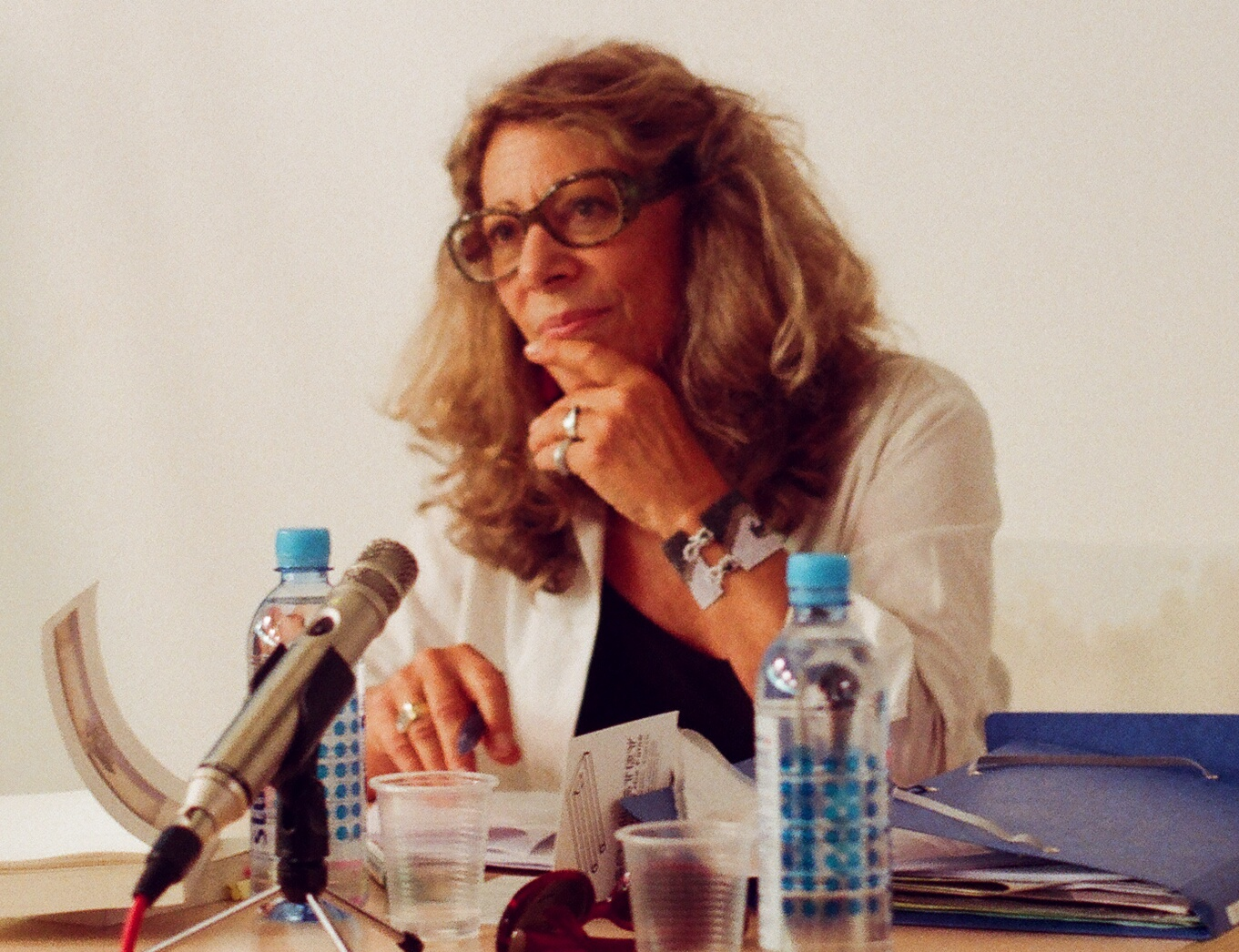
- Cassin in 2014
- Born: Laure Sylvie Barbara Cassin; 24 October 1947 (age 78); Boulogne-Billancourt, France

Education
- Education: Lycée La Fontaine
- Alma mater: University of Paris

Philosophical work
- Era: Contemporary philosophy
- Region: Western philosophy
- School: Continental philosophy
- Institutions: Académie Française

Barbara Cassin (French: [baʁbaʁa kasɛ̃]; born 24 October 1947) is a French philologist and philosopher. She was elected to the Académie Française on 4 May 2018. Cassin is the recipient of the Grand Prize of Philosophy of the Académie Française. She is an emeritus research director at the National Center for Scientific Research (CNRS) in Paris. She is a program director at the International College of Philosophy and the director of its Scientific Council and member of its board of directors. She was a director of Collège international de philosophie established by Jacques Derrida. In 2006 she succeeded Jonathan Barnes to the directorship of the leading centre of excellence in Ancient philosophy, Centre Leon-Robin, at the Sorbonne. In recent years she has been teaching seminars and writing books in partnership with Alain Badiou.

== Work ==
Her work centers on Sophism and rhetoric, and their relation to philosophy. In a footnote in 2007's Logic of Worlds, Alain Badiou portrays her work as a synthesis of Heideggerian thought with the linguistic turn.

From 1991 to 2007, she co-directed with Alain Badiou the series L'Ordre Philosophique, at Le Seuil publishers. She is the series editor of UNESCO's journal Revue des Femmes Philosophes.

She is the author of L'Effet Sophistique (1995) and the editor of Vocabulaire Européen des Philosophies, (2004) an international collective work of philosophers sponsored by the European Union. She has also written Google-moi. La Deuxième Mission de l'Amérique (2007),

In September 2012, a Cerisy symposium about her works was held, with contributions by Étienne Balibar, Fernando Santoro, Michel Deguy, Souleymane Bachir Diagne, Philippe-Joseph Salazar and Alain Badiou, among others. Barbara Cassin is also an art curator and her exhibition of translation is highly acclaimed.

== Publications ==
- Nostalgia: When Are We Ever at Home?. Fordham University Press, 2016
- Heidegger – His Life and His Philosophy. with Alain Badiou, Columbia University Press, 2016
- Sophistical Practice: Toward a Consistent Relativism. Fordham University Press, 2014
- There′s No Such Thing as a Sexual Relationship – Two Lessons on Lacan. with Alain Badiou, Columbia University Press, 2017
- Google Me : One-Click Democracy, Fordham University Press 2017
- Jacques the Sophist: Lacan, Logos, and Psychoanalysis. Fordham University Press, 2019

== See also ==
- Women in philosophy
- List of women philosophers
- Alain Badiou
- Hannah Arendt
- Sophists
- Linguistic turn
- Lacanianism
