= Gerard A. Hauser =

Author and academic

Gerard Alan Hauser (born May 20, 1943) is an American author and academic, and professor emeritus of communication and college professor emeritus of distinction in rhetoric at the University of Colorado Boulder. His research focuses on the interaction between formal and vernacular rhetorics in the public sphere. He has authored several books and numerous articles on the subject, and his writings have helped shaped the field of modern rhetoric.

== Early life and education ==
Hauser was born in Buffalo, New York, on May 20, 1943, to Albert Clement (a police officer) and Ann John Michalakes. He went to Canisius College, where he earned a B.A. in English in 1965. He then attended the University of Wisconsin Madison, where he earned both his M.A. in 1966 and his Ph.D. in 1970.

== Career ==
Hauser began teaching at Pennsylvania State University, University Park, as a professor of speech communication, where he worked from 1969 to 1993. While at Penn State he was director of university scholars program from 1987 to 1993. In 1993 he accepted a position at the University of Colorado at Boulder as professor of communication and department chair. He has since retired and is now professor emeritus of communication and college professor emeritus of distinction in rhetoric.

== Awards ==
Hauser received the Marie Hochmuth Nicholas Book Award from the National Communication Association in 2000 for Vernacular Voices: The Rhetoric of Publics and Public Spheres. He also received the George E. Yoos Distinguished Service Award from the Rhetoric Society of America in 2004 and was named distinguished scholar by National Communication Association in 2005 and named college professor of distinction 2007. The Rhetoric Society of America gives an award in his honor to graduate students at their biennial conference.

== Major publications ==
Hauser has written several books and articles on the topic of vernacular rhetoric, including Introduction to Rhetorical Theory (1986), Vernacular Voices: The Rhetoric of Publics and Public Spheres (1999), and Prisoners of Conscience: Moral Vernaculars of Political Agency (2012).

In Vernacular Voices, Hauser focuses his work on the notion of public opinion and his belief in the concept of public opinion and how it is rendered in terms of rhetorical interactions rather than numerical aggregates. He seeks to reconfigure not merely the notion of public opinion but the very notion of the public sphere delineated by Jürgen Habermas. His critique of Habermas is respectful and novel. In the book, Hauser problematizes the notion of a single idealized public sphere populated by rational, disinterested individuals discussing common issues. Instead, Hauser imagines the public sphere as a web-like structure providing for interaction between numerous vernacular publics. This interaction, in turn, provides for both a common sense of the world and shared judgments. The overriding norm of consensus is abandoned in favor of common social referents. As Hauser puts it, "A public's emergence is not dependent on consensus but on the sharing of a common world, even when understood and lived differently by different segments of society."

== Hauser's concept of vernacular discourse in the public sphere ==
According to Hauser, a public is “the interdependent members of society who hold different opinions about a mutual problem and who seek to influence its resolution through discourse”. A public sphere is “a discursive space in which individuals and groups associate to discuss matters of mutual interest and, where possible, to reach a common judgment about them. It is the locus of emergence for rhetorically salient meanings”. There are multiple publics and multiple public spheres. They are reticulated, discourse based, and emerge when two or more individuals come together to discuss a matter in the public interest. Hauser's public spheres are based firmly in rhetoric because it “establishes our interpretations of experience”. Public discourse is vernacular discourse. It is informal and occurs among those discursive practices engaged by individuals. These vernacular conversations are then linked, by shared concerns and subjects, to strangers in a lattice that are extrapolated to larger webs. They are formed by opinions, which are judgments based on evidence. Vernacular publics are not things but a process that takes a variety of forms based on time and place. Under Hauser's model then, vernacular rhetoric is active, not very formal, and can be at times, messy and chaotic. It is based on the lived experiences of all of us and how we conduct our lives in the public sphere. It is here where Hauser diverges from Habermas the most. Where Habermas idealized the salon and tearoom, Hauser privileges street corners, bars, and bowling alleys.
