= Claire Katz =

American philosopher (born 1964)

Claire Elise Katz
- Born: 4 November 1964 (age 61)
- Awards: Murray and Celeste Fasken Chair in Distinguished Teaching

Education
- Education: University of Memphis

Philosophical work
- Era: 21st century Philosophy
- Region: Western philosophy
- School: Continental
- Main interests: Feminist theory, Modern Jewish thought, Philosophy of education, and Philosophy of religion

Claire Elise Katz (born 4 November 1964) is an American philosopher and professor of philosophy at Texas A&M University, who is known for her expertise on feminist theory, modern Jewish thought, philosophy of education, and philosophy of religion. Katz was appointed the Murray and Celeste Fasken Chair in Distinguished Teaching in 2017 and awarded the American Philosophical Association's Prize for Excellence in Philosophy Teaching in 2019.

== Philosophy for Children Texas ==
Katz is director of Texas A&M's Philosophy for Children program, which has aimed to incorporate philosophy into primary and secondary education since its inception in 2016.

== Awards and prizes ==
- Prize for Excellence in Philosophy Teaching, American Philosophical Association, 2019
- Murray and Celeste Fasken Chair in Distinguished Teaching, Texas A&M University, 2017-2022

== Books ==
- Unrepentant Women: Gender, Judaism, and the Limits of Forgiveness, Indiana University Press, forthcoming
- Growing Up with Philosophy Camp: How Learning to Think Develops Friendship, Community, and a Sense of Self, Rowman & Littlefield Publishers, 2020
- An Introduction to Modern Jewish Philosophy, I.B. Tauris Press, 2014
- Levinas and the Crisis of Humanism, Indiana University Press, 2013
- Levinas, Judaism, and the Feminine: The Silent Footsteps of Rebecca, Bloomington: Indiana University Press, 2003
