= Public hypersphere =

Public hypersphere is a type of public sphere that has come into existence globally through the use of modern information technology, digital media, and computer networks.

Swedish writer Karl-Erik Tallmo used the corresponding Swedish term hyperoffentlighet in an article in the daily Sydsvenska Dagbladet in 1999 and the same year also the English expression public hypersphere in an article in the journal Human IT.

The term is derived from Jürgen Habermas and his thoughts concerning a bourgeois public sphere. The public hypersphere, however, is not limited to publishing or the European café culture, not even to the Internet but includes the larger part of human relations, mediated or not. It encompasses both voluntary participation as well as involuntary, through mass surveillance: "The electronic traces we leave constantly write our autobiographies ... [The public hypersphere is] a gas that fills the entire available space, it is 'the place that doesn't exist'." The public hypersphere is "not just public or transparent to a higher degree than the regular public sphere; it has a whole new structure. Mathematicians talk about hyperspheres when they want to describe a sphere of higher dimensionality, where normal geometric rules don't apply – here, the shortest path between two points is not necessarily a straight line."

The French philosopher and media scholar Pierre Lévy used the expression l'hypersphère publique in an article in 2011 in the journal Medium. He describes the combined effect of social media, real time functions, and wireless technology. He mentions API programming as important when it comes to connecting various databases with different interfaces. He writes that traditional information monopolies are dissolved and a kind of digital ecosystem has evolved, where old and new media interact. Citizens gain new liberties in expressing and retrieving information but also new ways to establish personal contacts. All these new phenomena "contribute in building a ubiquitous medium, hypercomplex and fractal, that everyone, nolens volens, partake in designing, directing and using ..." Lévy has also written about the transformation of the public sphere in his book Cyberdémocratie (2002).

In German, the word Hyperöffentlichkeit has been used by sociologist Udo Thiedeke in his characterization of Howard Rheingold's ideas concerning the virtual community, that is a high degree of participation and interactivity.
