= Public sphere =

Area in social life with political ramifications

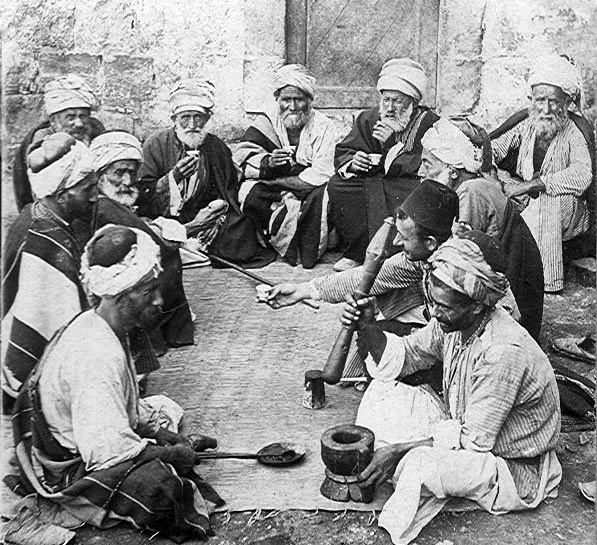
A coffeehouse discussion in Palestine, c. 1900

The public sphere (German: Öffentlichkeit) is an area in social life where individuals can come together to freely discuss and identify societal problems, and through that discussion, influence political action. A "Public" is "of or concerning the people as a whole." Such a discussion is called public debate and is defined as the expression of views on matters that are of concern to the public—often, but not always, with opposing or diverging views being expressed by participants in the discussion. Public debate takes place mostly through the mass media, but also at meetings or through social media, academic publications, and government policy documents.

The term was originally coined by German philosopher Jürgen Habermas who defined the public sphere as "made up of private people gathered together as a public and articulating the needs of society with the state". Communication scholar Gerard A. Hauser defines it as "a discursive space in which individuals and groups associate to discuss matters of mutual interest and, where possible, to reach a common judgment about them". The public sphere can be seen as "a theater in modern societies in which political participation is enacted through the medium of talk" and "a realm of social life in which public opinion can be formed".

== History ==
Describing the emergence of the public sphere in the 18th century, Habermas noted that the public realm, or sphere, originally was "coextensive with public authority", while "the private sphere comprised civil society in the narrower sense, that is to say, the realm of commodity exchange and of social labor". Whereas the "sphere of public authority" dealt with the state, or realm of the police, and the ruling class, or the feudal authorities (church, princes and nobility) the "authentic 'public sphere'", in a political sense, arose at that time from within the private realm, specifically, in connection with literary activities, the world of letters. This new public sphere spanned the public and the private realms, and "through the vehicle of public opinion it put the state in touch with the needs of society". "This area is conceptually distinct from the state: it [is] a site for the production and circulation of discourses that can in principle be critical of the state." The public sphere "is also distinct from the official economy; it is not an arena of market relations but rather one of the discursive relations, a theater for debating and deliberating rather than for buying and selling". These distinctions between "state apparatuses, economic markets, and democratic associations... are essential to democratic theory". The people themselves came to see the public sphere as a regulatory institution against the authority of the state. The study of the public sphere centers on the idea of participatory democracy, and how public opinion becomes political action.

The ideology of the public sphere theory is that the government's laws and policies should be steered by the public sphere and that the only legitimate governments are those that listen to the public sphere. "Democratic governance rests on the capacity of and opportunity for citizens to engage in enlightened debate". Much of the debate over the public sphere involves what is the basic theoretical structure of the public sphere, how information is deliberated in the public sphere, and what influence the public sphere has over society.

== Definitions ==
Jürgen Habermas claims "We call events and occasions 'public' when they are open to all, in contrast to closed or exclusive affairs". This 'public sphere' is a "realm of our social life in which something approaching public opinion can be formed. Access is guaranteed to all citizens".

This notion of the public becomes evident in terms such as public health, public education, public opinion, or public ownership. They are opposed to the notions of private health, private education, private opinion, and private ownership. The notion of the public is intrinsically connected to the notion of the private.

Habermas stresses that the notion of the public is related to the notion of the common. For Hannah Arendt, the public sphere is therefore "the common world" that "gathers us together and yet prevents our falling over each other".

Habermas defines the public sphere as a "society engaged in critical public debate".

Conditions of the public sphere are according to Habermas:

- The formation of public opinion
- All citizens have access
- Conference in unrestricted fashion (based on the freedom of assembly, the freedom of association, the freedom to expression and publication of opinions) about matters of general interest, which implies freedom from economic and political control.
- Debate over the general rules governing relations.

== Jürgen Habermas: bourgeois public sphere ==
Most contemporary conceptualizations of the public sphere are based on the ideas expressed in Jürgen Habermas' book The Structural Transformation of the Public Sphere – An Inquiry into a Category of Bourgeois Society, which is a translation of his Habilitationsschrift, Strukturwandel der Öffentlichkeit:Untersuchungen zu einer Kategorie der bürgerlichen Gesellschaft. The German term Öffentlichkeit (public sphere) encompasses a variety of meanings and it implies a spatial concept, the social sites or arenas where meanings are articulated, distributed, and negotiated, as well as the collective body constituted by, and in this process, "the public". The work is still considered the foundation of contemporary public sphere theories, and most theorists cite it when discussing their own theories.

The bourgeois public sphere may be conceived above all as the sphere of private people come together as a public; they soon claimed the public sphere regulated from above against the public authorities themselves, to engage them in a debate over the general rules governing relations in the basically privatized but publicly relevant sphere of commodity exchange and social labor.

Through this work, he gave a historical-sociological account of the creation, brief flourishing, and demise of a "bourgeois" public sphere based on rational-critical debate and discussion: Habermas stipulates that, due to specific historical circumstances, a new civic society emerged in the eighteenth century. Driven by a need for open commercial arenas where news and matters of common concern could be freely exchanged and discussed—accompanied by growing rates of literacy, accessibility to literature, and a new kind of critical journalism—a separate domain from ruling authorities started to evolve across Europe. "In its clash with the arcane and bureaucratic practices of the absolutist state, the emergent bourgeoisie gradually replaced a public sphere in which the ruler's power was merely represented before the people with a sphere in which state authority was publicly monitored through informed and critical discourse by the people".

In his historical analysis, Habermas points out three so-called "'institutional criteria" as preconditions for the emergence of the new public sphere. The discursive arenas, such as Britain's coffee houses, France's salons, and Germany's Tischgesellschaften "may have differed in the size and compositions of their publics, the style of their proceedings, the climate of their debates, and their topical orientations", but "they all organized discussion among people that tended to be ongoing; hence they had a number of institutional criteria in common":

1. Disregard of status: Preservation of "a kind of social intercourse that, far from presupposing the equality of status, disregarded status altogether. ...Not that this idea of the public was actually realized in earnest in the coffee houses, salons, and the societies; but as an idea, it had become institutionalized and thereby stated as an objective claim. If not realized, it was at least consequential." (loc. cit.)
2. Domain of common concern: "...discussion within such a public presupposed the problematization of areas that until then had not been questioned. The domain of 'common concern' which was the object of public critical attention remained a preserve in which church and state authorities had the monopoly of interpretation. ...The private people for whom the cultural product became available as a commodity profaned it inasmuch as they had to determine its meaning on their own (by way of rational communication with one another), verbalize it, and thus state explicitly what precisely in its implicitness for so long could assert its authority." (loc. cit.)
3. Inclusivity: However exclusive the public might be in any given instance, it could never close itself off entirely and become consolidated as a clique; for it always understood and found itself immersed within a more inclusive public of all private people, persons who – insofar as they were propertied and educated – as readers, listeners, and spectators could avail themselves via the market of the objects that were subject to discussion. The issues discussed became 'general' not merely in their significance, but also in their accessibility: everyone had to be able to participate. ...Wherever the public established itself institutionally as a stable group of discussants, it did not equate itself with the public but at most claimed to act as its mouthpiece, in its name, perhaps even as its educator – the new form of bourgeois representation." (loc. cit.).

Habermas argued that the bourgeois society cultivated and upheld these criteria. The public sphere was well established in various locations including coffee shops and salons, areas of society where various people could gather and discuss matters that concerned them. The coffee houses in London society at this time became the centers of art and literary criticism, which gradually widened to include even the economic and the political disputes as matters of discussion. In French salons, as Habermas says, "opinion became emancipated from the bonds of economic dependence". Any new work, or a book or a musical composition had to get its legitimacy in these places. It not only paved a forum for self-expression but in fact had become a platform for airing one's opinions and agendas for public discussion.

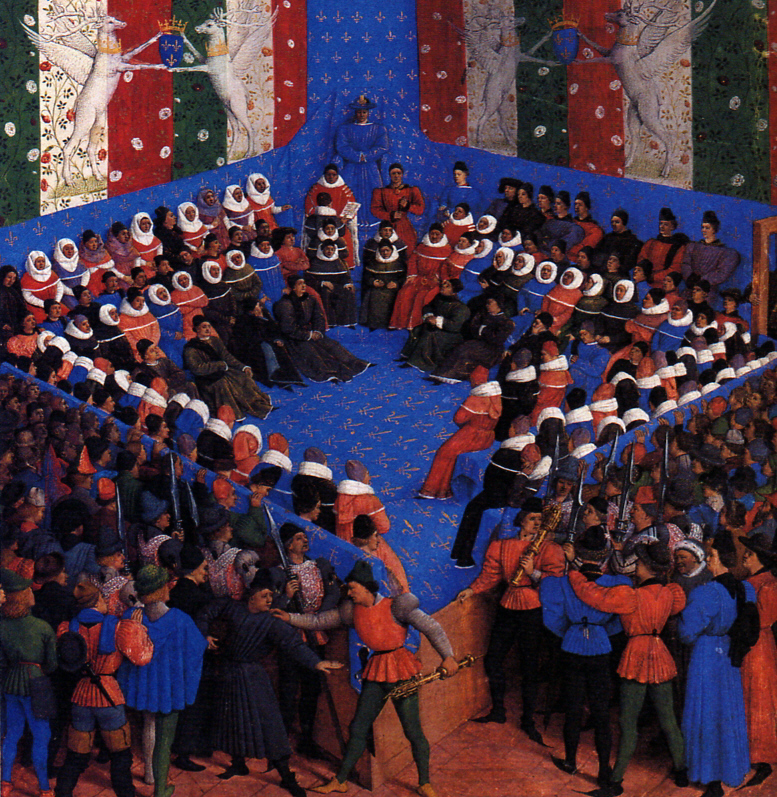
Parliamentary action under Charles VII of France

The emergence of a bourgeois public sphere was particularly supported by the 18th-century liberal democracy making resources available to this new political class to establish a network of institutions like publishing enterprises, newspapers and discussion forums, and the democratic press was the main tool to execute this. The key feature of this public sphere was its separation from the power of both the church and the government due to its access to a variety of resources, both economic and social.

As Habermas argues, in due course, this sphere of rational and universalistic politics, free from both the economy and the State, was destroyed by the same forces that initially established it. This collapse was due to the consumeristic drive that infiltrated society, so citizens became more concerned about consumption than political actions. Furthermore, the growth of capitalistic economy led to an uneven distribution of wealth, thus widening economic polarity. Suddenly the media became a tool of political forces and a medium for advertising rather than the medium from which the public got their information on political matters. This resulted in limiting access to the public sphere and the political control of the public sphere was inevitable for the modern capitalistic forces to operate and thrive in the competitive economy.

Therewith emerged a new sort of influence, i.e., media power, which, used for purposes of manipulation, once and for all took care of the innocence of the principle of publicity. The public sphere, simultaneously restructured and dominated by the mass media, developed into an arena infiltrated by power in which, by means of topic selection and topical contributions, a battle is fought not only over influence but over the control of communication flows that affect behavior while their strategic intentions are kept hidden as much as possible.

== Counterpublics, feminist critiques and expansions ==
Although Structural Transformation was (and is) one of the most influential works in contemporary German philosophy and political science, it took 27 years until an English version appeared on the market in 1989. Based on a conference on the occasion of the English translation, at which Habermas himself attended, Craig Calhoun (1992) edited Habermas and the Public Sphere – a thorough dissection of Habermas' bourgeois public sphere by scholars from various academic disciplines. The core criticism at the conference was directed towards the above stated "institutional criteria":

1. Hegemonic dominance and exclusion: In "Rethinking the Public Sphere," Nancy Fraser offers a feminist revision of Habermas' historical description of the public sphere, and confronts it with "recent revisionist historiography". She refers to other scholars, like Joan Landes, Mary P. Ryan and Geoff Eley, when she argues that the bourgeois public sphere was in fact constituted by a "number of significant exclusions." In contrast to Habermas' assertions on disregard of status and inclusivity, Fraser claims that the bourgeois public sphere discriminated against women and other historically marginalized groups: "...this network of clubs and associations – philanthropic, civic, professional, and cultural – was anything but accessible to everyone. On the contrary, it was the arena, the training ground and eventually the power base of a stratum of bourgeois men who were coming to see themselves as a "universal class" and preparing to assert their fitness to govern." Thus, she stipulates a hegemonic tendency of the male bourgeois public sphere, which dominated at the cost of alternative publics (for example by gender, social status, ethnicity and property ownership), thereby averting other groups from articulating their particular concerns.
2. Bracketing of inequalities: Fraser makes us recall that "the bourgeois conception of the public sphere requires bracketing inequalities of status". The "public sphere was to be an arena in which interlocutors would set aside such characteristics as a difference in birth and fortune and speak to one another as if they were social and economic peers". Fraser refers to feminist research by Jane Mansbridge, which notes several relevant "ways in which deliberation can serve as a mask for domination". Consequently, she argues that "such bracketing usually works to the advantage of dominant groups in society and to the disadvantage of subordinates." Thus, she concludes: "In most cases, it would be more appropriate to unbracket inequalities in the sense of explicitly thematizing them – a point that accords with the spirit of Habermas' later communicative ethics".
3. The problematic definition of "common concern": Nancy Fraser points out that "there are no naturally given, a priori boundaries" between matters that are generally conceived as private, and ones we typically label as public (i.e. of "common concern"). As an example, she refers to the historic shift in the general conception of domestic violence, from previously being a matter of primarily private concern, to now generally being accepted as a common one: "Eventually, after sustained discursive contestation we succeeded in making it a common concern".

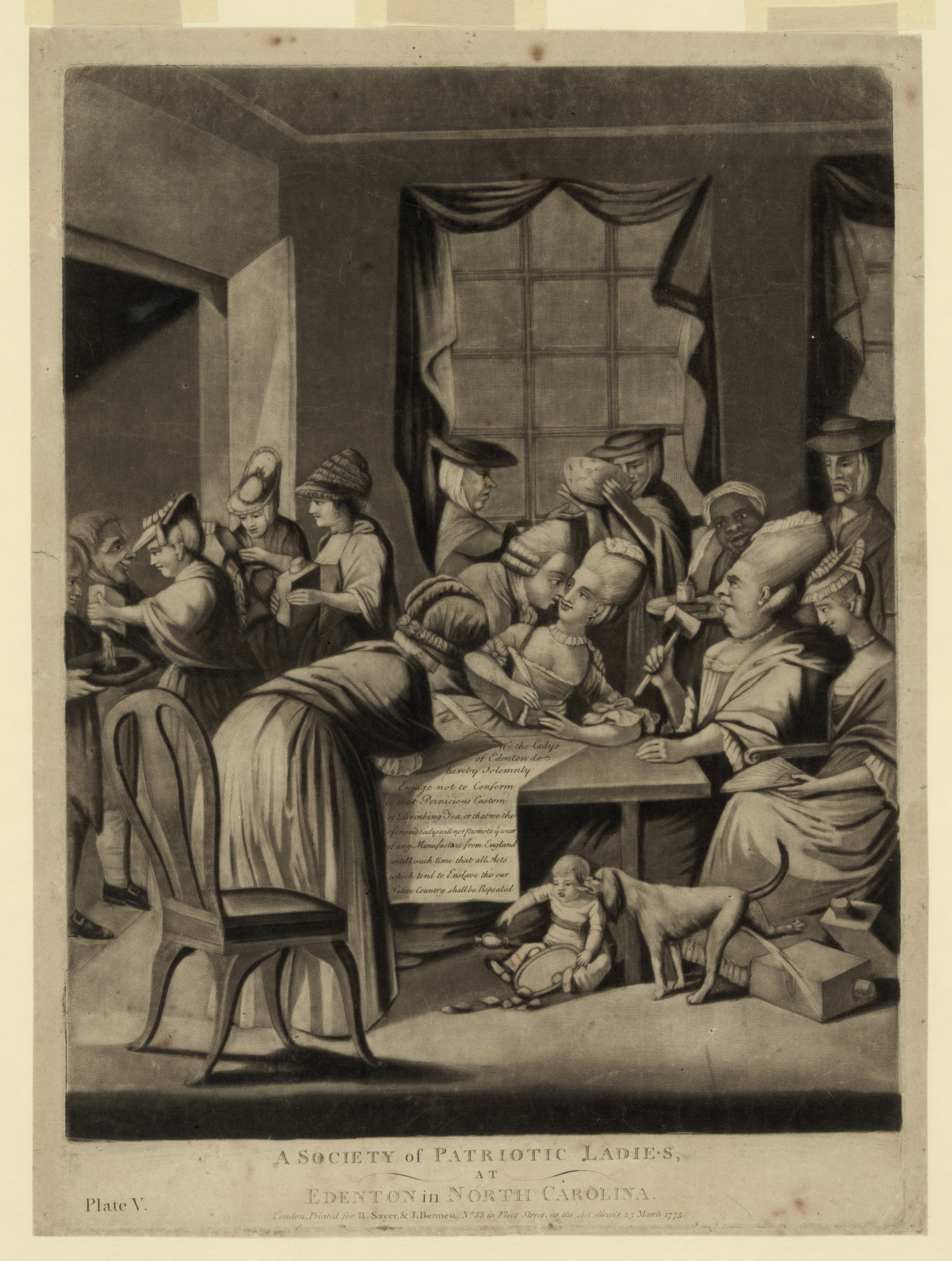
A Society of Patriotic Ladies at Edenton in North Carolina, satirical drawing of a women's counterpublic in action in the 1775 Tea Boycott

Nancy Fraser identified the fact that marginalized groups are excluded from a universal public sphere, and thus it was impossible to claim that one group would, in fact, be inclusive. However, she claimed that marginalized groups formed their own public spheres, and termed this concept a subaltern counter public or counter-public.

Fraser worked from Habermas' basic theory because she saw it to be "an indispensable resource" but questioned the actual structure and attempted to address her concerns. She made the observation that "Habermas stops short of developing a new, post-bourgeois model of the public sphere". Fraser attempted to evaluate Habermas' bourgeois public sphere, discuss some assumptions within his model, and offer a modern conception of the public sphere.

In the historical reevaluation of the bourgeois public sphere, Fraser argues that rather than opening up the political realm to everyone, the bourgeois public sphere shifted political power from "a repressive mode of domination to a hegemonic one". Rather than rule by power, there was now rule by the majority ideology. To deal with this hegemonic domination, Fraser argues that repressed groups form "Subaltern counter-publics" that are "parallel discursive arenas where members of subordinated social groups invent and circulate counterdiscourses to formulate oppositional interpretations of their identities, interests, and needs".

Benhabib notes that in Habermas' idea of the public sphere, the distinction between public and private issues separates issues that normally affect women (issues of "reproduction, nurture and care for the young, the sick, and the elderly") into the private realm and out of the discussion in the public sphere. She argues that if the public sphere is to be open to any discussion that affects the population, there cannot be distinctions between "what is" and "what is not" discussed. Benhabib argues for feminists to counter the popular public discourse in their own counter public.

The public sphere was long regarded as men's domain whereas women were supposed to inhabit the private domestic sphere. A distinct ideology that prescribed separate spheres for women and men emerged during the Industrial Revolution.

The concept of heteronormativity is used to describe the way in which those who fall outside of the basic male/female dichotomy of gender or whose sexual orientations are other than heterosexual cannot meaningfully claim their identities, causing a disconnect between their public selves and their private selves. Michael Warner made the observation that the idea of an inclusive public sphere makes the assumption that we are all the same without judgments about our fellows. He argues that we must achieve some sort of disembodied state to participate in a universal public sphere without being judged. His observations point to a homosexual counter public, and offers the idea that homosexuals must otherwise remain "closeted" to participate in the larger public discourse.

== Rhetorical ==
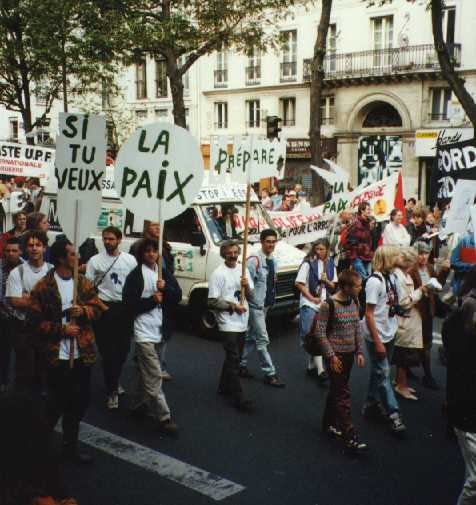
Demonstration against French nuclear tests in 1995 in Paris: "This interaction can take the form of... basic "street rhetoric" that "open[s] a dialogue between competing factions".

Gerard Hauser proposed a different direction for the public sphere than previous models. He foregrounds the rhetorical nature of public spheres, suggesting that public spheres form around "the ongoing dialogue on public issues" rather than the identity of the group engaged in the discourse.

Rather than arguing for an all-inclusive public sphere, or the analysis of tension between public spheres, he suggested that publics were formed by active members of society around issues. They are a group of interested individuals who engage in vernacular discourse about a specific issue. "Publics may be repressed, distorted, or responsible, but any evaluation of their actual state requires that we inspect the rhetorical environment as well as the rhetorical act out of which they evolved, for these are the conditions that constitute their individual character". These people formed rhetorical public spheres that were based in discourse, not necessarily orderly discourse but any interactions whereby the interested public engages each other. This interaction can take the form of institutional actors as well as the basic "street rhetoric" that "open[s] a dialogue between competing factions." The spheres themselves formed around the issues that were being deliberated. The discussion itself would reproduce itself across the spectrum of interested publics "even though we lack personal acquaintance with all but a few of its participants and are seldom in contexts where we and they directly interact, we join these exchanges because they are discussing the same matters". To communicate within the public sphere, "those who enter any given arena must share a reference world for their discourse to produce awareness for shared interests and public opinions about them". This world consists of common meanings and cultural norms from which interaction can take place. The rhetorical public sphere has several primary features:

1. It is discourse-based, rather than class-based.
2. The critical norms are derived from actual discursive practices. Taking a universal reasonableness out of the picture, arguments are judged by how well they resonate with the population that is discussing the issue.
3. Intermediate bracketing of discursive exchanges. Rather than a conversation that goes on across a population as a whole, the public sphere is composed of many intermediate dialogs that merge later on in the discussion.

The rhetorical public sphere was characterized by five rhetorical norms from which it can be gauged and criticized. How well the public sphere adheres to these norms determine the effectiveness of the public sphere under the rhetorical model. Those norms are:

1. permeable boundaries: Although a public sphere may have a specific membership as with any social movement or deliberative assembly, people outside the group can participate in the discussion.
2. activity: Publics are active rather than passive. They do not just hear the issue and applaud, but rather they actively engage the issue and the publics surrounding the issue.
3. contextualized language: They require that participants adhere to the rhetorical norm of contextualized language to render their respective experiences intelligible to one another.
4. believable appearance: The public sphere must appear to be believable to each other and the outside public.
5. tolerance: In order to maintain a vibrant discourse, others opinions need to be allowed to enter the arena.

In all this Hauser believes a public sphere is a "discursive space in which strangers discuss issues they perceive to be of consequence for them and their group. Its rhetorical exchanges are the bases for shared awareness of common issues, shared interests, tendencies of extent and strength of difference and agreement, and self-constitution as a public whose opinions bear on the organization of society."

This concept that the public sphere acts as a medium in which public opinion is formed as analogous to a lava lamp. Just as the lamp's structure changes, with its lava separating and forming new shapes, so does the public sphere's creation of opportunities for discourse to address public opinion, thereby forming new discussions of rhetoric. The lava of the public which holds together the public arguments is the public conversation.

== Media ==
Habermas argues that the public sphere requires "specific means for transmitting information and influencing those who receive it". By definition, this means that media are fundamental for constituting and maintaining a public sphere.

=== As actors in the political public sphere ===
According to Habermas, there are two types of actors without whom no political public sphere could be put to work: professionals in the media system and politicians.

For Habermas, there are five types of actors who make their appearance on the virtual stage of an established public sphere:

(a) Lobbyists who represent special interest groups;

(b) Advocates who either represent general interest groups or substitute for a lack of representation of marginalized groups that are unable to voice their interests effectively;

(c) Experts who are credited with professional or scientific knowledge in some specialized area and are invited to give advice;

(d) Moral entrepreneurs who generate public attention for supposedly neglected issues;

(e) Intellectuals who have gained, unlike advocates or moral entrepreneurs, a perceived personal reputation in some field (e.g., as writers or academics) and who engage, unlike experts and lobbyists, spontaneously in public discourse with the declared intention of promoting general interests.

Libraries have been inextricably tied to educational institutions in the modern era having developed within democratic societies. Libraries took on aspects of the public sphere (as did classrooms), even while public spheres transformed in the macro sense. These contextual conditions led to a fundamental conservative rethinking of civil society institutions like schools and libraries.

=== YouTube ===
Habermas argues that under certain conditions, the media act to facilitate discourse in a public sphere. The rise of the Internet has brought about a resurgence of scholars applying theories of the public sphere to Internet technologies.

For example, a study by S. Edgerly et al. focused on the ability of YouTube to serve as an online public sphere. The researchers examined a large sample of video comments using the California Proposition 8 (2008) as an example. The authors argue that some scholars think the online public sphere is a space where a wide range of voices can be expressed due to the "low barrier of entry" and interactivity. However, they also show a number of limitations. Edgerly et al. say that the affirmative discourse presupposes that YouTube can be an influential player in the political process and that it can serve as an influential force to politically mobilize young people. YouTube has allowed anyone and everyone to be able to get any political knowledge they wish. The authors mention critiques that say YouTube is built around the popularity of videos with sensationalist content. It has also allowed people to broadcast themselves for a large public sphere, where people can form their own opinions and discuss different things in the comments. The research by Edgerly, et al. found that the analysed YouTube comments were diverse. They argue that this is a possible indicator that YouTube provides space for public discussion. They also found that YouTube videos' style influences the nature of the commentary. Finally, they concluded that the video's ideological stances influenced the language of the comments. The findings of the work suggest that YouTube is a public sphere platform.

Additional work by S. Buckley reflected on the role that news content, specifically US cable news, contributed towards the formation of the public sphere. His research analysed a total of 1239 videos uploaded by five news organisations and investigated the link between content and user engagement. Through both content and sentiment analysis, it was suggested that the sentiment of the language used in the titles of the videos had an impact upon the public, with negatively sentimental titles generated more user engagement. Buckley suggested that due to the aspect of emotionality that is present in news content that due to the ongoing process of media hybridization, a new conceptual framework of the public sphere that acknowledges how both thoughtful discussions as well as ones which express feelings in an overt way needs to be developed.

=== Limitations of media and the internet ===
Some, like Colin Sparks, note that a new global public sphere ought to be created in the wake of increasing globalization and global institutions, which operate at the supranational level. However, the key questions for him were, whether any media exists in terms of size and access to fulfil this role. The traditional media, he notes, are close to the public sphere in this true sense. Nevertheless, limitations are imposed by the market and concentration of ownership. At present, the global media fail to constitute the basis of a public sphere for at least three reasons. Similarly, he notes that the internet, for all its potential, does not meet the criteria for a public sphere and that unless these are "overcome, there will be no sign of a global public sphere".

German scholars Jürgen Gerhards and Mike S. Schäfer conducted a study in 2009 to establish whether the Internet offers a better and broader communication environment compared to quality newspapers. They analysed how the issue of human genome research was portrayed between 1999 and 2001 in popular quality newspapers in both Germany and the United States in comparison to the way it appeared on search engines at the time of their research. Their intention was to analyse what actors and what sort of opinions the subject generated in both print and the Internet and verify whether the online space proved to be a more democratic public sphere, with a wider range of sources and views. Gerhards and Schäfer say they have found "only minimal evidence to support the idea that the internet is a better communication space as compared to print media". "In both media, communication is dominated by (bio- and natural) scientific actors; popular inclusion does not occur". The scholars argue that the search algorithms select the sources of information based on the popularity of their links. "Their gatekeeping, in contrast to the old mass media, relies mainly on technical characteristics of websites". For Gerhards and Schäfer the Internet is not an alternative public sphere because less prominent voices end up being silenced by the search engines' algorithms. "Search engines might actually silence societal debate by giving more space to established actors and institutions". Another tactic that supports this view is astroturfing. The Guardian columnist George Monbiot said that Astroturfing software, "has the potential to destroy the internet as a forum for constructive debate. It jeopardizes the notion of online democracy".

=== Virtual ===
There has been an academic debate about how social media impacts the public sphere. The sociologists Brian Loader and Dan Mercea give an overview of this discussion. They argue that social media offers increasing opportunities for political communication and enable democratic capacities for political discussion within the virtual public sphere. The effect would be that citizens could challenge governments and corporations' political and economic power. Additionally, new forms of political participation and information sources for the users emerge with the Internet that can be used, for example, in online campaigns. However, the two authors say that social media's dominant uses are entertainment, consumerism, and content sharing among friends. Loader and Mercea say that "individual preferences reveal an unequal spread of social ties with a few giant nodes such as Google, Yahoo, Facebook and YouTube attracting the majority of users". They also stress that some critics have voiced the concern that there is a lack of seriousness in political communication on social media platforms. Moreover, lines between professional media coverage and user-generated content would blur on social media.

The authors conclude that social media provides new opportunities for political participation; however, they warn users of the risks of accessing unreliable sources. The Internet impacts the virtual public sphere in many ways, but is not a free utopian platform as some observers argued at the beginning of its history.

=== Mediated publicness ===
John Thompson criticises the traditional idea of public sphere by Habermas, as it is centred mainly in face-to-face interactions. On the contrary, Thompson argues that modern society is characterized by a new form of "mediated publicness", whose main characteristics are:

- Despatialized (there is a rupture of time/space. People can see more things, as they do not need to share the same physical location, but this extended vision always has an angle, which people do not have control over).
- Non dialogical (unidirectional. For example, presenters on TV are not able to adapt their discourse to the reactions of the audience, since they are visible to a wide audience but that audience is not directly visible to them. However, internet allows a bigger interactivity).
- Wider and more diverse audiences. (The same message can reach people with different education, different social class, different values and beliefs, and so on.)

This mediated publicness has altered the power relations in a way in which not only the many are visible to the few but the few can also now see the many:

"Whereas the Panopticon renders many people visible to a few and enables power to be exercised over the many by subjecting them to a state of permanent visibility, the development of communication media provides a means by which many people can gather information about a few and, at the same time, a few can appear before many; thanks to the media, it is primarily those who exercise power, rather than those over whom power is exercised, who are subjected to a certain kind of visibility".

However, Thompson also acknowledges that "media and visibility is a double-edged sword" meaning that even though they can be used to show an improved image (by managing the visibility), individuals are not in full control of their self-presentation. Mistakes, gaffes or scandals are now recorded therefore they are harder to deny, as they can be replayed by the media.

=== The public service model ===
Examples of the public service model include BBC in Britain, and the ABC and SBS in Australia. The political function and effect of modes of public communication have traditionally continued with the dichotomy between Hegelian State and civil society. The dominant theory of this mode includes the liberal theory of the free press. However, the public service, state-regulated model, whether publicly or privately funded, has always been seen not as a positive good but as an unfortunate necessity imposed by the technical limitations of frequency scarcity.

According to Habermas's concept of the public sphere, the strength of this concept is that it identifies and stresses the importance for democratic politics of a sphere distinct from the economy and the State. On the other hand, this concept challenges the liberal free press tradition form the grounds of its materiality, and it challenges the Marxist critique of that tradition from the grounds of the specificity of politics as well.

From Garnham's critique, three great virtues of Habermas's public sphere are mentioned. Firstly, it focuses on the indissoluble link between the institutions and practices of mass public communication and the institutions and practices of democratic politics. The second virtue of Habermas's approach concentrates on the necessary material resource base for anti-public. Its third virtue is to escape from the simple dichotomy of free market versus state control that dominates so much thinking about media policy.

== Non-liberal theories ==
Oskar Negt & Alexander Kluge took a non-liberal view of public spheres, and argued that Habermas' reflections on the bourgeois public sphere should be supplemented with reflections on the proletarian public spheres and the public spheres of production.

=== Proletarian ===
The distinction between bourgeois and proletarian public spheres is not mainly a distinction between classes. The proletarian public sphere is rather to be conceived of as the "excluded", vague, unarticulated impulses of resistance or resentment. The proletarian public sphere carries the subjective feelings, the egocentric malaise with the common public narrative, interests that are not socially valorized:

"As extraeconomic interests, they exist—precisely in the forbidden zones of fantasy beneath the surface of taboos—as stereotypes of a proletarian context of living that is organized in a merely rudimentary form."

The bourgeois and proletarian public spheres are mutually defining: The proletarian public sphere carries the "left-overs" from the bourgeois public sphere, while the bourgeois public is based upon the productive forces of the underlying resentment:

"In this respect, they "[i.e. the proletarian public spheres]" have two characteristics: in their defensive attitude toward society, their conservatism, and their subcultural character, they are once again mere objects; but they are, at the same time, the block of real life that goes against the valorization interest. As long as capital is dependent on living labor as a source of wealth, this element of the proletarian context of living cannot be extinguished through repression."

Stephen Thompson considered the existence of a proletarian public sphere from c.1900 to 1948 in South Wales though his examination of the working class provision of medical attendance. He concluded that: 'there existed in South Wales a proletarian public sphere founded on alternative values to the bourgeois, Liberal hegemony ...' Furthermore, 'with a strong tradition of self-sufficiency, the people of south Wales set about organizing their medical services on their own terms and in a way that addressed their particular needs.'

=== Production ===
Negt and Kluge furthermore say the necessity of considering a third dimension of the public spheres: The public spheres of production. The public spheres of production collect the impulses of resentment and instrumentalise them in the productive spheres. The public spheres of production are wholly instrumental and have no critical impulse (unlike the bourgeois and proletarian spheres). The interests that are incorporated in the public sphere of production are given capitalist shape, and questions of their legitimacy are thus neutralized.

=== Biopolitical public ===
By the end of the 20th century, the discussions about public spheres got a new biopolitical twist. Traditionally the public spheres had been contemplated as to how free agents transgress the private spheres. Michael Hardt and Antonio Negri have, drawing on the late Michel Foucault's writings on biopolitics, suggested that we reconsider the very distinction between public and private spheres. They argue that the traditional distinction is founded on a certain (capitalist) account of property that presupposes clear-cut separations between interests. This account of property is (according to Hardt and Negri) based upon a scarcity economy. The scarcity economy is characterized by the impossibility of sharing the goods. If "agent A" eats the bread, "agent B" cannot have it. The interests of agents are thus, generally, clearly separated.

However, with the evolving shift in the economy towards an informational materiality, in which value is based upon the informational significance, or the narratives surrounding the products, the clear-cut subjective separation is no longer obvious. Hardt and Negri see the open source approaches as examples of new ways of co-operation that illustrate how economic value is not founded upon exclusive possession, but rather upon collective potentialities. Informational materiality is characterized by gaining value only through being shared. Hardt and Negri thus suggest that the commons become the focal point of analyses of public relations. The point being that with this shift it becomes possible to analyze how the very distinctions between the private and public are evolving.

== See also ==
- Argumentation theory
- Commons
- Interpersonal relationship
- Online deliberation
- Project for Public Spaces
- Public hypersphere
- The Public Sphere: An Encyclopedia Article (1964)
- Res publica
- Rule according to higher law
- Richard Sennett
- The Lives of Others – A film that describes the monitoring of the cultural scene of East Berlin by agents of the Stasi during the Cold War
