= Charles Villa-Vicencio =

South African theologian, ethicist, Methodist minister, and academic

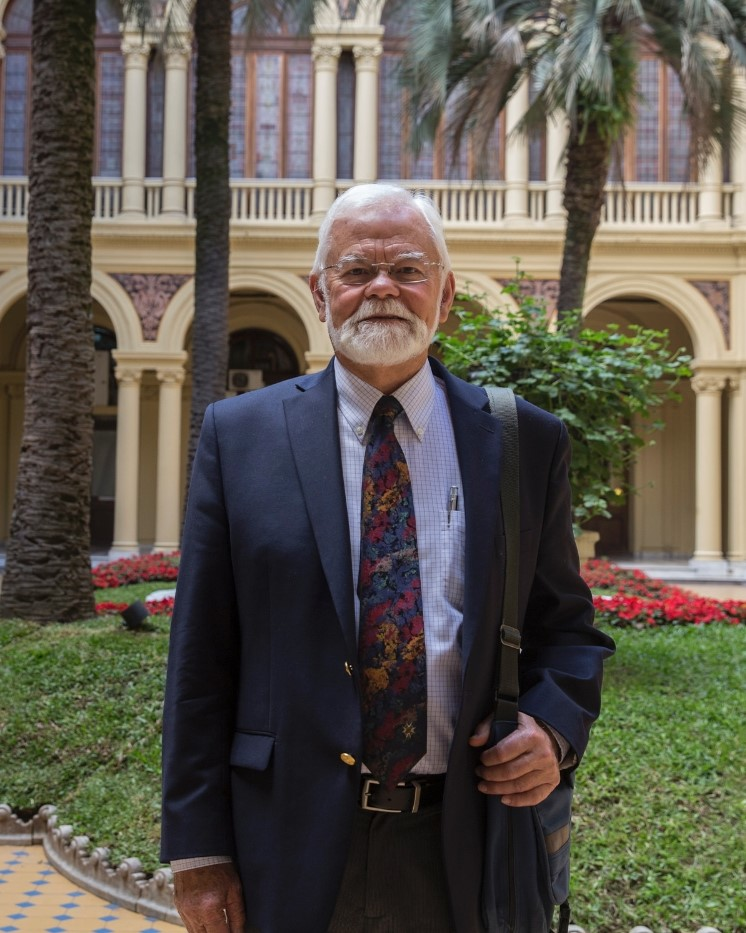
- Villa-Vicencio in Buenos Aires, 2017
- Born: Charles Morio Leopold Villa-Vicencio; November 7, 1942 (age 83); Johannesburg, South Africa
- Education: Rhodes University (BA); Yale University (MA); Drew University (PhD)
- Occupations: Director of Truth and Reconciliation Commission; Professor of religious studies, restorative and transitional justice and reconciliation, ethics, and political science
- Years active: 1960s–present
- Employer(s): University of Cape Town, Georgetown University
- Organization(s): Truth and Reconciliation Commission; Institute for Justice and Reconciliation
- Known for: Theology, human rights, reconciliation, and transitional justice
- Notable work: A Theology of Reconstruction; The Spirit of Freedom; Walk with Us and Listen; Conversations in Transition; Africa Renaissance and Afro-Arab Spring
- Title: Emeritus Professor

Charles Morio Leopold Villa-Vicencio (born 7 November 1942) is a prominent South African theologian, anti-apartheid activist, ethicist, Methodist minister, and distinguished public intellectual and academic. He is Emeritus Professor of Religious Studies at the University of Cape Town and was a visiting research professor at Georgetown University's Berkley Center until December 2022, whereafter he retired at age 80. He served as the National Research Director of South Africa's Truth and Reconciliation Commission (TRC), which organised public hearings into human rights abuses committed during apartheid.

== Early life and education ==
Charles Morio Leopold Villa-Vicencio was born on 7 November 1942 in Johannesburg.

Born to a lower-middle-class family, he grew up in the Northwestern suburbs of Auckland Park and Melville, where he attended Roosevelt High School until matriculating in 1960.

After first working in a local bank for a few years, he attended Rhodes University, where he received a Bachelor of Arts degree.

His further studies included a full academic scholarship to Yale University, where he received a Master of Arts degree, and a Doctor of Philosophy degree from Drew University.

== Ministry, activism and academic career ==
Villa-Vicencio was ordained as a Methodist minister and became a prominent figure in South African theology and public ethics during the apartheid era. Working closely with clandestine ANC operations, the UDF and various anti-apartheid networks throughout this period, he played a key role in the internal resistance to apartheid system.

He served as Professor of Religion and Society at the University of Cape Town and was later appointed Emeritus Professor of Religious Studies.

From 1996 to 1998, Villa-Vicencio served as National Research Director of the Truth and Reconciliation Commission, chaired by Archbishop Desmond Tutu. In this role, he oversaw the commission's research programme and contributed to the development of its intellectual and ethical framework.

In 2000, he founded the Institute for Justice and Reconciliation in Cape Town and served as its executive director.

At the Institute for Justice and Reconciliation, Villa-Vicencio worked closely with Archbishop Desmond Tutu, the institute's patron, to promote dialogue, restorative justice, and reconciliation in South Africa and other societies emerging from conflict.

Villa-Vicencio also served as a visiting research professor at Georgetown University, where his work has focused on religion, peacebuilding, and global ethics.

A regular contributor to public debate in South Africa, Villa-Vicencio has written and commented extensively on issues of religion, ethics, democracy, and transitional justice.

== International work ==
Villa-Vicencio has worked in countries affected by civil war, authoritarianism, and ethnic conflict, including the Basque Country, Peru, Sri Lanka, Palestine, Colombia, Rwanda, and several other African countries.

His international work has focused on truth commissions, restorative justice, reconciliation, and democratic institution-building.

== Scholarship ==
Villa-Vicencio's scholarship addresses:

- Theology and ethics
- Human rights
- Reconciliation and restorative justice
- Religion and politics
- Transitional justice

== Selected publications ==
=== Books ===
- A Theology of Reconstruction: Nation-Building and Human Rights
- The Spirit of Freedom: South African Leaders on Religion and Politics
- Walk with Us and Listen: Political Reconciliation in Africa (2009)
- Conversations in Transition: The South African Story (2012)
- Africa Renaissance and Afro-Arab Spring: A Season of Rebirth? (co-edited with Erik Doxtader and Ebrahim Moosa, 2015)

=== Journal articles ===
- Villa-Vicencio, Charles (2000). "Why Perpetrators Should Not Always Be Prosecuted: Where the International Criminal Court and Truth Commissions Meet." Emory Law Journal 49 (1): 205–222.
