= Fanie du Toit =

South African politician

Permanent delegate to the National Council of Provinces from the North West
- In office 23 May 2019 – 28 May 2024

Personal details
- Born: Stephanus Franszouis du Toit
- Party: Freedom Front Plus
- Profession: Politician

Stephanus Franszouis du Toit, known as Fanie du Toit, is a South African politician who served as a permanent delegate to the National Council of Provinces from May 2019 until May 2024. A member of the Freedom Front Plus, Du Toit was a member of the North West provincial delegatio.

== Parliamentary career ==
Du Toit is a member of the Freedom Front Plus. Following the election on 8 May 2019, he was sworn in as an MP on 23 May 2019. He is one of two permanent FF Plus representatives in the National Council of Provinces. Du Toit was a member of the North West delegation.

Du Toit did not return to the NCOP following the 2024 general election.

=== Committee assignments ===
He was named to the following committees on 24 June 2019:

- Select Committee on Appropriations
- Select Committee on Finance
- Select Committee on Land Reform, Environment, Mineral Resources and Energy
- Select Committee on Public Enterprises and Communication
