= Hegel Society of America =

Learned society

The Hegel Society of America
- Abbreviation: HSA
- Formation: November, 1968
- Founded at: Spartanburg, South Carolina
- Type: Learned Society
- Purpose: "To promote the study of the philosophy of Hegel, its place within the history of thought, its relation to social, political, and cultural movements since his time, and its relevance to contemporary issues and fields of knowledge.
- Location: United States
- Origins: 1968-present
- Members: 400
- President: Mark Alznauer
- Vice President: Timothy Brownlee
- Treasurer: Ardis B. Collins
- Secretary: Michael Baur
- Key people: Alex Adamson, Councilor; Jeffrey Church, Councilor; Nicolletta Montaner, Councilor Sally Sedgwick, Councilor
- Publication: The Owl of Minerva
- Website: https://www.hegel.org

The Hegel Society of America (HSA) is a learned society whose purpose is promoting the study of Hegel and Hegelianism. The Owl of Minerva is the official journal of the HSA.

== History ==
Hegel Society of America was formed at Wofford Symposium on "Hegel's philosophy of religion" in the Thanksgiving break of November 1968, in Spartanburg, South Carolina. Shortly after this event, in March 1969 the executive council of the HSA met in Vanderbilt University, and drafted the constitution of the society. Darrel Christensen of Wofford College was elected as its first President/Chairman, Warren E. Steinkraus as its vice-president, Robert L. Perkins of University of South Alabama was elected as Secretary, Donald P. Verene of Northern Illinois University as its Treasurer and Frederick G. Weiss of Purdue University became in charge of the society's newsletter, The Owl of Minerva. Otho Mel Adkins of Pasadena College became the West Coast representative. Other members of the initial council included George L. Kline of Bryn Mawr College. John D. Caputo served as Society's secretary during 1978-1980 period.

== Activities ==
The HSA meets every two years for three days. Each meeting features a program on a theme selected democratically by the membership. The proceedings of every meeting except that held in 1980 have been published or are in press.

== Cooperation ==
HSA scholars cooperate with scholars from the following institutions:

1. Hegel Society of Great Britain
2. The Internationale Hegel-Vereinigung
3. The Internationale Hegel-Gesellschaft
4. The Centre de recherche et de documentation sur Hegel
5. The Hegel-Archiv at Ruhr Universität, Bochum, Germany

== List of officers ==
The Hegel Society of America elects its president for a two-year term by the vote of its executive council. The list of its presidents include:

Term	President(s)	Vice-president(s)
2024–2026	Mark Alznauer	Timothy Brownlee
2022–2024	Kevin Thompson	Jeffrey Church
2020–2022	Jere Surber	Sebastian Rand
2018–2020	Jere Surber	Sebastian Rand
2016–2018	Allegra de Laurentiis and Jere Surber	Mark Alznauer
2014–2016	Angelica Nuzzo and Allegra de Laurentiis	Glenn Alexander Magee
2012–2014	Robert Bernasconi and Adriaan Peperzak	Ned Beach and Allegra de Laurentiis
2010–2012	Ardis Collins and Adrian Peperzak	Andrew Buchwalter
2008–2010	Will Dudley and Bill Maker	Angelica Nuzzo and Mark Tunick
2006–2008	Philip Grier and Jere Surber	David S. Stern
2004–2006	John McCumber	Will Dudley
2002–2004	Richard Dien Winfield	Philip Grier
2000–2002	David Kolb	Jere Surber
1998–2000	Robert R. Williams	David Duquette
1996–1998	Lawrence Stepelevich	Robert R. Williams
1994–1996	Stephen Houlgate	
1992–1994	Donald Phillip Verene	Stephen Houlgate
1990–1992	William Desmond	Ardis Collins
1988–1990	John W. Burbidge	David Kolb
1986–1988	Joseph C. Flay	George di Giovanni
1984–1986	George L. Kline	William Desmond
1982–1984	Merold Westphal	Joseph C. Flay
1980–1982	Quentin Lauer	John W. Burbidge
1978–1980	H. S. Harris	Merold Westphal
1976–1978	Errol E. Harris	Robert L. Perkins
1974–1976	Kenneth L. Schmitz	Kenley R. Dove
1972–1974	Louis A. Dupré	H. S. Harris
1970–1972	John Edwin Smith	George L. Kline
1969–1970	Darrel E. Christensen	Warren E. Steinkraus

== See also ==
- Metaphysical Society of America
