= Darrel E. Christensen =

American philosopher (1923–1992)

- Born: 1923; Nebraska
- Died: 1992 (aged 68–69)

Academic background
- Education: University of Chicago (MA); University of Southern California (PhD)
- Thesis: Some Implications for the Doctrine of God of Hegel's Concept of Thought as Mediation (1965)
- Doctoral advisor: William H. Werkmeister

Academic work
- Era: 21st-century philosophy
- Region: Western philosophy
- Institutions: Wofford College
- Main interests: Hegel's philosophy

Darrel Elvyn Christensen (1923–1992) was an American philosopher. He was the founder of Hegel Society of America and its first president. His interest lied particularly in the connection between Hegel and Whitehead.

== Life and works ==
Christensen was born Nebraska. He completed his Bachelor of Arts degree at Hastings College in 1945. He went on to earn a Master of Theology from the Southern California School of Theology in 1957, followed by a Master of Arts from the University of Chicago in 1959. After spending a year at the Claremont Schools, he obtained his Ph.D. from the University of Southern California in 1965, writing a dissertation on "Some Implications for the Doctrine of God of Hegel's Concept of Thought as Mediation" under the supervision of William H. Werkmeister. He began his academic career teaching at Wofford College for several years before relocating in the early 1970s to Salzburg, Austria, where he lived for the rest of his life.

In 1968, he organized a symposium on Hegel and the philosophy of religion at Wofford College. During this event, he convened a small group of scholars and proposed the establishment of a learned society in the United States dedicated exclusively to the study of Hegel. The scholars—Christensen himself, Otho N. Adkins, George L. Kline, Robert L. Perkins, Warren E. Steinkraus, Donald P. Verene, and Frederick G. Weiss—constituted the original Executive Council of the Hegel Society of America. All participants in the symposium were designated as charter members of the society.

=== Selected publications ===
- Christensen, Darrel E., ed. (1970). Hegel and the Philosophy of Religion. doi:10.1007/978-94-011-9152-4. ISBN 978-94-011-8439-7.
- Contemporary German Philosophy. Pennsylvania State University Press. 1982. ISBN 978-0-271-00336-8.
- The Search for Concreteness: Reflections on Hegel and Whitehead : A Treatise on Self-evidence and Critical Method in Philosophy. Susquehanna University Press. September 1986. ISBN 978-0-941664-22-6.
- Hegelian/Whiteheadian Perspectives. University Press of America. 1989. ISBN 978-0-8191-7078-1.
