= Zuckert =

Zuckert is surname of:

- Bill Zuckert (1915–1997), American actor
- Eugene M. Zuckert (1911–2000), United States Secretary of the Air Force
- León Zuckert (1904, Poltava - 1992, Toronto), Ukrainian-Canadian composer, conductor, arranger, violinist, violist
- Catherine Zuckert (born 1942), American political philosopher
- Michael Zuckert (born 1942), American political philosopher
- Rachel Zuckert, American philosopher

== Zückert ==
- Johann Friedrich Zückert (1737, Berlin - 1778, Berlin), German physician
