= Richard Dien Winfield =

American philosopher (born 1950)

- Born: April 7, 1950 (age 76); New York City, U.S.
- Spouse: Sujata Gupta Winfield

Education
- Education: Yale University
- Thesis: The Social Determination of Production the Critique of Hegel's System of Needs and Marx' Concept of Capital (1977)
- Doctoral advisor: Louis Dupré, Andrzej Rapaczynski
- Other advisor: Kenley R. Dove

Philosophical work
- Era: 21st-century philosophy
- Region: Western philosophy
- Main interests: Hegel; epistemology; metaphysics; political philosophy; aesthetics

Richard Dien Winfield (born April 7, 1950) is an American philosopher and distinguished research professor of philosophy at the University of Georgia. He has been president of the Society for Systematic Philosophy, the Hegel Society of America, and the Metaphysical Society of America. Winfield was a candidate for U.S. representative from Georgia's 10th congressional district in 2018 and for U.S. Senate during the 2020–21 United States Senate special election in Georgia.

== Academic career ==
Winfield graduated from Yale College with a BA in 1972. He studied at the University of Paris at Vincennes in 1969-1970. In 1973 he completed a Magister Artium in philosophy at the University of Heidelberg, writing his master's thesis under Dieter Henrich. Winfield completed his philosophy PhD at Yale University in 1977. His doctoral thesis was The Social Determination of Production: The Critique of Hegel's System of Needs and Marx' Concept of Capital; his advisers were Louis Dupré and Andrzej Rapaczynski. In 1982 Winfield accepted a post as professor of philosophy at the University of Georgia. Also in 1982 he won the Roe Foundation Hegel Prize for his essay "Hegel's Challenge to the Modern Economy". In 1986 Winfield was elected president of the Society for Systematic Philosophy. From 2002 to 2004 he served as elected president of the Hegel Society of America. From 2013 to 2015, Winfield held the elected position of vice-president and then president of the Metaphysical Society of America.

== Personal life ==
In 2019, Winfield founded the nonprofit organization Alliance for a Social Bill of Rights, which advocates social rights such as a federal job guarantee, Medicare for all, and legal care for all.

== Work ==
Along with William Maker, Kenley R. Dove and Stephen Houlgate, Winfield is said to defend a 'presuppositionless' and 'non-foundational' reading of Hegel's Logic.

== Books ==
- Rethinking the Arts after Hegel: From Architecture to Motion Pictures (Palgrave Macmillan, 2023), ISBN 978-3-031-35541-7
- In Defense of Reason After Hegel: Why We Are So Wise (Anthem Press, 2022), ISBN 978-1-83998-242-2
- Democracy Unchained: How We Should Fulfill Our Social Rights and Save Self-Government (Deeds Publishing, 2020), ISBN 978-1-950794-13-3
- Universal Biology after Aristotle, Kant, and Hegel: The Philosopher's Guide to Life in the Universe (Palgrave Macmillan, 2018), ISBN 978-3-319-75357-7
- Conceiving Nature after Aristotle, Kant, and Hegel: The Philosopher's Guide to the Universe (Palgrave Macmillan, 2017), ISBN 978-3-319-66280-0
- Rethinking Capital (Palgrave Macmillan, 2016), ISBN 978-3-319-39840-2
- The Intelligent Mind: On the Origin and Constitution of Discursive Thought (Palgrave Macmillan, 2015), ISBN 978-1-137-54932-7
- Hegel and the Future of Systematic Philosophy (Palgrave Macmillan, 2014),ISBN 978-1-137-44237-6
- Hegel's Phenomenology of Spirit: A Critical Rethinking in Seventeen Lectures (Rowman & Littlefield, 2013), ISBN 978-1-4422-2337-0
- Hegel's Science of Logic: A Critical Rethinking in Thirty Lectures (Rowman & Littlefield, 2012), ISBN 978-1-4422-1934-2
- The Living Mind: From Psyche to Consciousness (Rowman & Littlefield, 2011), ISBN 978-1-4422-1155-1
- Hegel and Mind: Rethinking Philosophical Psychology (Palgrave Macmillan, 2010), ISBN 978-0-230-24100-8
- Modernity, Religion, and the War on Terror. Routledge. April 15, 2016. doi:10.4324/9781315595962. ISBN 978-1-315-59596-2.
- From Concept to Objectivity. Routledge. 2016-12-05. doi:10.4324/9781315254951. ISBN 978-1-351-93560-9.
- The Just State: Rethinking Self-Government (Humanity Books, 2005), ISBN 978-1-59102-317-3
- Autonomy and Normativity: Investigations of Truth, Right and Beauty (Ashgate, 2001), ISBN 978-0-7546-1620-7
- The Just Family (State University of New York Press, 1998), ISBN 978-0-7914-3998-2
- Stylistics: Rethinking the Artforms after Hegel (State University of New York Press, 1996), ISBN 978-0-7914-2782-8
- Systematic Aesthetics (University Press of Florida, 1995), ISBN 978-0-8130-1368-8
- Law in Civil Society (University Press of Kansas, 1995), ISBN 978-0-7006-0699-3
- Freedom and Modernity (State University of New York Press, 1991), ISBN 978-0-7914-0810-0
- Overcoming Foundations: Studies in Systematic Philosophy (1 ed.). London: Routledge. 2024-07-31. doi:10.4324/9781003535461. ISBN 978-1-003-53546-1.
- Reason and Justice (State University of New York Press, 1988), ISBN 978-0-88706-711-2
- The Just Economy (Routledge, 1988), ISBN 978-1-032-19459-2
- Introduction ("Hegel and The Legitimation of Modernity") to and translation of Joachim Ritter's Hegel and The French Revolution: Essays on the Philosophy of Right (Cambridge, MA: MIT Press, 1982) ISBN 0-262-18105-3

== Book chapters ==
- "Negation, Contradiction, and Hegel's Emancipation of Truth, Right, and Beauty", in The Being of Negation in Post-Kantian Philosophy, ed. Gregory S. Moss (Cham Switzerland: Springer, 2022), pp. 377–396.
- "On Capital Punishment", in Social Work, Criminal Justice, and the Death Penalty, ed. Lauren A. Ricciardelli (Oxford: Oxford University Press, 2020), pp. 63–74.
- "On Contradiction: Hegel versus Aristotle, Sextus Empiricus, and Kant", in Hegel and Ancient Philosophy: A Re-Examination, ed. Glenn Magee (New York: Routledge, 2018), pp. 147–160.
- "Hegel and the Problem of Consciousness", in Consciousness and the Great Philosophers, ed. Stephen Leach & James Tartaglia (London: Routledge, 2017), pp. 125–132.
- "The Logic of Right", in Hegel's Political Philosophy: On the Normative Significance of Method and System, ed. Thom Brooks & Sebastian Stein (Oxford: Oxford University Press, 2017), pp. 222–238.
- "Why I Am So Wise: Hegelian Reflections on Whether Reason can be Enhanced", in Creolizing Hegel, ed. Michael Monahan (Lantham, MD: Rowman & Littlefield, 2017), pp. 79–91.
- "Hegel's Overcoming of the Overcoming of Metaphysics", in Hegel and Metaphysics: On Logic and Ontology in the System, ed. Allegra de Laurentis (Berlin/Boston: De Gruyter, 2016), pp. 59–70.
- "Hegel and the Origin of Language", in Hegel's Philosophical Psychology, ed. Susanne Herrmann-Sinai & Lucia Ziglioli (New York: Routledge, 2016), pp. 91–103.
- "Economy and Ethical Community", in Hegel and Capitalism (Albany, NY: SUNY Press, 2015), pp. 133–146.
- "The Psychology of Will and the Deduction of Right", in Essays on Hegel's Philosophy of Subjective Spirit, ed. David S. Stern (Albany, NY: SUNY Press, 2013), pp. 201–221.
- "The Normativity of Globalization" trans. as "La Normatività della Globalizzazione", in Il pensiero di Hegel nell'Età della globalizzazione, ed. by G. Rinaldi (Aracne Editrice, Rome 2012), pp. 281–299.
- "The Limits of Intersubjectivity in Hegel's Philosophy of Subjective Spirit" trans. as "I Limiti dell'Intersoggettività nella Filosofia Hegeliana dello Spirito Soggettivo", in Il pensiero di Hegel nell'Età della globalizzazione, ed. by G. Rinaldi (Aracne Editrice, Rome 2012), pp. 203–221.
- "Hegel's Solution to the Mind/Body Problem", in The Blackwell Companion to Hegel (Oxford: Blackwell, 2011), pp. 227–242.
- "Philosophy of History: Hegelian and Anti-Hegelian", in The Humanities at Work: International Exchange of Ideas in Aesthetics, Philosophy, and Literature, ed. by Yubraj Aryal (Kathmandu: Sunlight Publication, 2008), pp. 184–193.
- "Identity, Difference, and the Unity of Mind: Reflections on Hegel's Determination of Psyche, Consciousness, and Intelligence", in Identity and Difference: Studies in Hegel's Logic, Philosophy of Spirit, and Politics, ed. by Philip Grier (Albany, NY: SUNY Press, 2007), pp. 103–127.
- "Literary Form and Civilization", in Literature and Philosophy: Essaying Connections, ed. by Supriya Chaudhuri (Kolkata: Papyrus, 2006), pp. 46–62
- "The System of Syllogism", in Hegel's Theory of the Subject, ed. by David Gray Carlson (London: Palgrave MacMillan, 2005), pp. 146–164.
- "The Types of Universals and the Forms of Judgment", in Hegel's Theory of the Subject, ed. by David Gray Carlson (London: Palgrave MacMillan, 2005), pp. 115–128.
- "Rethinking Politics: Carl Schmitt vs. Hegel", in Hegel and Law, ed. by Michael Salter (Aldershot, UK: Ashgate, 2003), pp. 259–275; essay appeared earlier in The Owl of Minerva, Vol. 22, No. 2, Spring 1991, pp. 209–225.
- "Post-Colonialism and Right", in Beyond Liberalism and Communitarianism: Studies in Hegel's Philosophy of Right, ed. by Robert Williams (Albany: State University of New York Press, 2001), pp. 91–109.
- "The Challenge of Architecture to Hegel's Aesthetics", in Hegel's Aesthetics, ed. by William Maker (Albany: State University of New York Press, 2000), pp. 97–111.
- "Space, Time and Matter: Conceiving Nature Without Foundations", in Hegel's Philosophy of Nature, ed. by Stephen Houlgate (Albany: State University of New York Press, 1998), 51-68.
- "Hegel", entry in The Philosophy of Law: An Encyclopedia, ed. by Christopher B. Gray (New York: Garland Publishing, 1999), Vol. I, pp. 351–353.
- "Conceiving Reality Without Foundations: Hegel's Neglected Strategy for Realphilosophie", in G. W. F. Hegel, Critical Assessments, ed. Robert Stern (London: Routledge, 1998), Vol. III, pp. 292–310; essay first appeared in The Owl of Minerva, Vol. 15, No. 2, Spring 1984, pp. 183–198.
- "The Method of Hegel's Science of Logic", in Essays On Hegel's Logic, ed. by George di Giovanni (Albany: State University of New York Press, 1990), pp. 45–57.
- "Territorial Rights", in The Territorial Rights of Nations and Peoples: Essays From The Basic Issues Forum, ed. by John Jacobson (Lewiston: Edwin Mellen Press, 1989), pp. 187–210.
- "Hegel versus The New Orthodoxy", in Hegel and His Critics, ed. by William Desmond (Albany: State University of New York Press, 1989), pp. 219–235.
- "Can Philosophy Have A Rational History?", in At The Nexus of Philosophy and History, ed. by Bernard P. Dauenhauer (Athens: University of Georgia Press, 1987), pp. 42–57.
- "Comments on Robert E. William's 'Hegel's Concept of Geist'", in Hegel's Philosophy of Spirit, ed. by Peter G. Stillman (Albany: State University of New York Press, 1987), pp. 21–24.
- "Hegel's Challenge to The Modern Economy", in both History and System, ed. by Robert L. Perkins (Albany: State University of New York Press, 1984), pp. 219–253, and Hegel On Freedom and Economics, ed. by William Maker (Macon: Mercer University Press, 1987), pp. 29–63.
- "The Theory and Practice of The History of Freedom: The Right of History in Hegel's Philosophy of Right", in History and System: Hegel's Philosophy of History, ed. by Robert L. Perkins (Albany: State University of New York Press, 1984), pp. 123–144.
- "Freedom As Interaction: Hegel's Resolution to The Dilemma of Liberal Theory", in Hegel's Theory of Action, ed. by Lawrence S. Stepelevich and David Lamb (Atlantic Highlands, NJ: Humanities Press, 1983), pp. 173–190.

== Journal articles ==
- "Time and Reason: How Unveiling the Mystery of Time Certifies Rational Autonomy", Plí: The Warwick Journal of Philosophy, Volume 31 (2019), pp. 95–103.
- "Being and Idea: From Kant to Hegel", Hegel Jahrbuch 2016, pp. 454–460.
- "Self-Determination in Logic and Reality", The Review of Metaphysics, Vol. LXIX, No. 3, Issue No. 275, March 2016, pp. 467–494.
- "The Objectivity of Thought: A Hegelian Meditation", The Philosophical Forum, Vol. XLIV, No. 4, Winter 2013, pp. 329–339.
- "Truth, the Good, and the Unity of Theory and Practice", The Review of Metaphysics, Volume 67, No. 2, December 2013, pp. 405–422.
- "The Logic of Nature", The Journal of Speculative Philosophy, Vol. 27, No. 2, 2013, pp. 172–187.
- "The Challenge of Political Right", Bulletin of the Hegel Society of Great Britain, No. 65, 2012, pp. 61–74.
- "The End of Logic", Idealistic Studies, Fall 2011, Volume 41, Issue 3, pp. 135–148.
- "Is Phenomenology Necessary as Introduction to Philosophy?", The Review of Metaphysics, December 2011, Vol. LXV, No. 2, Issue No. 258, pp. 1–19.
- "Negation and Truth", The Review of Metaphysics, December 2010, Vol. LXIV, No. 2, Issue No. 254, pp. 273–289.
- "Hegel, Mechanism, and Mind: Why Machines Have No Psyche, Consciousness, or Intelligence", Bulletin of the Hegel Society of Great Britain, Nos. 59/60, 2009, pp. 1–18.
- "How Should Essence Be Determined? Reflections on Hegel's Two Divergent Accounts", International Philosophical Quarterly, Vol. 48, No. 2, Issue 190 (June 2008), pp. 187–199.
- "Beyond the Sociality of Reason: From Davidson to Hegel", The Philosophical Forum, Vol. XXXVIII, No. 1, Spring 2007, pp. 1–21.
- "From Representation to Thought: Reflections on Hegel's Determination of Intelligence", The Owl of Minerva, Vol. 39:1-2, Fall 2007-Summer 2008, pp. 55–86.
- "Self-Consciousness and Intersubjectivity", The Review of Metaphysics, Vol. LIX, No. 4, Issue No. 236, June 2006, pp. 757–779.
- "The System of Syllogism", Cardozo Journal of Law, Policy and Ethics, Vol 3:1 (2004), pp. 245–268.
- "The Types of Universals and the Forms of Judgment", Cardozo Journal of Law, Policy and Ethics, Vol 3:1 (2004), pp. 125–142.
- "Modernity, Religion and the War on Terrorism", International Readings on Theory, History and Philosophy of Culture, #18, 2004, pp. 329–347.
- "Objectivity in Logic and Nature", The Owl of Minerva, 34:1 (Fall/Winter 2002-03), pp. 77–90.
- "The Classical Nude and the Limits of Sculpture", Revue Internationale de Philosophie, 3/2002, n. 221, pp. 443–460.
- "From Concept To Judgment: Rethinking Hegel's Overcoming of Formal Logic", Dialogue: Canadian Philosophical Review, XL, 2001, 53-74.
- "Concept, Individuality and Truth", Bulletin of the Hegel Society of Great Britain, Double Issue, Nos 39/45, 1999, 35-46.
- "Relativism and Democracy", Jadavpur Journal of Philosophy, Vol. 10, No. 1, Fall 1998, 1-12.
- "Friendship, Family and Ethical Community", The Philosophical Forum, Vol. 28, No. 4 & Vol. 29, No. 1, Fall 1997 - Winter 1998, 1-20.
- "Unity in the Common Law?", The Canadian Journal of Law & Jurisprudence, Vol. IX, No. 2, July 1996, 411-422.
- "Ethical Community Without Communitarianism", Philosophy Today, No. 2, 1996, 310-320.
- "Hegel, Romanticism and Modernity", The Owl of Minerva, Vol. 27, No. 1, Fall 1995, 3-16.
- "Conceiving the Individual Arts: Lessons From Kant and Hegel", Idealistic Studies, Vol. 25, No. 2, Spring/Summer 1995, 195-209.
- "Should the Economy Be Democratized?", Southeastern Political Review, Vol. 23, No. 4, December 1995, pp. 689–702.
- "Hegel On Classical Art: A Reexamination", Clio, Vol. 24, No. 2, Winter 1995, pp. 147–167.
- "Natural Beauty and the Philosophy of Art", The Journal of Speculative Philosophy, Vol. 9, No. 1, February 1995, pp. 48–62.
- "Rethinking the Legal Process", American Journal of Jurisprudence, Vol. 39, December 1994, pp. 153–184.
- "The Individuality of Art and the Collapse of Metaphysical Aesthetics", American Philosophical Quarterly, Vol. 31, No. 1, January 1993, pp. 39–51.
- "Rethinking The Particular Forms of Art: Prolegomena to a Rational Reconstruction of Hegel's Theory of the Artforms", The Owl of Minerva, Vol. 24, No. 2, Spring 1993, pp. 131–144.
- "Freedom From Foundations: The Normativity of Autonomy In Theory and Practice", Jadavpur Journal of Philosophy, Vol. 4, No. 1, Fall 1992, pp. 1–27.
- "Hegel's Remedy For The Impasse of Contemporary Philosophy", Reason Papers, Vol. 16, Summer 1991, pp. 115–132.
- "Morality Without Community", Praxis International, Vol. 11, No. 3, October 1991, pp. 327–339.
- "Rethinking Politics: Carl Schmitt Versus Hegel", The Owl of Minerva, Vol. 22, No. 2, Spring 1991, pp. 209–225.
- "Reply to George Lucas' Critique of Reason and Justice", The Owl of Minerva, Vol. 22, No. 1, Fall 1990, pp. 91–93.
- "With What Must Ethics Begin? Reflections On Benson's Account of Property and Contract", Cardozo Law Review, Vol. 11, No. 3, February 1990, pp. 537–548.
- "Reply To Tony Smith's Review of The Just Economy", The Owl of Minerva, Vol. 21, No. 2, Spring 1990, pp. 223–227.
- "Is Hegel's Logic A Transcendental Ontology?: On White's Absolute Knowledge", Man and World, Vol. 20, No. 3, August 1987, pp. 337–349.
- "Dialectical Logic and The Conception of Truth", Journal of The British Society For Phenomenology, Vol. 18, No. 2, 1987, pp. 133–148.
- "Logic, Language and The Autonomy of Reason: Reflections On The Place of Hegel's Analysis of Thinking", Idealistic Studies, Vol. 17, No. 2, May 1987, pp. 109–121.
- "Conceiving Something Without Any Conceptual Scheme", The Owl of Minerva, Vol. 18, No. 1, Fall 1986, pp. 13–28.
- "The Reason For Democracy", History of Political Thought, Vol. V, No. 3, Winter 1984, pp. 543–573.
- "The Legitimacy of Freedom and The Quest For Justice", Social Concept, Vol. 1, No. 3, Spring 1984, pp. 3–24.
- "Conceiving Reality Without Foundations: Hegel's Neglected Strategy For Realphilosophie", The Owl of Minerva, Vol. 15, No. 2, Spring 1984, pp. 183–198; reprinted in G. W. F. Hegel, Critical Assessments Vol. III, ed. By Robert Stern (London: Routledge, 1993), pp. 292–310.
- "The Route To Foundation-Free Systematic Philosophy", The Philosophical Forum, Vol. XV, No. 3, Spring 1984, pp. 323–343.
- "Capital, Civil Society and The Deformation of Politics", History of Political Thought, Vol. IV, No. 1, February 1983, pp. 111–155.
- "The Injustice of Human Rights", Philosophy and Social Criticism, Vol. 9, No. l, 1982, pp. 81–96.
- "The Social Determination of The Labor Process From Hegel To Marx", The Philosophical Forum, Vol. XI, No. 3, Spring 1980, pp. 250–272.
- "The Logic of Marx' Capital", Telos, No. 27, Spring 1976, pp. 111–139.
- "The Young Hegel and The Dialectic of Social Production", Telos, No. 26, Winter 1975-1976, pp. 184–194.
- "The Dilemma of Labor", Telos, No. 24, Summer 1975, pp. 115–128.
