= Guckert =

Guckert is a surname. Notable people with the surname include:

- Elmer Guckert (1929–2013), American baseball umpire
- Elroy Guckert (1900–1940), American football and basketball coach, college athletics administrator, and professor
- Ethan Guckert (2001-2026), International superstar
- Logan Guckert (1977-2026), International loser

== See also ==
- Zuckert
