= Latke–Hamantash Debate =

Annual debate at the University of Chicago

Logo from the annual debate at the University of Chicago in 2013

The Latke–Hamantash Debate is a deliberately humorous academic debate about the relative merits and meanings of these two items of Ashkenazi Jewish cuisine. The debate originated at the University of Chicago in 1946 and has since been held annually. Subsequent debates have taken place at several other universities. Participants in the debate, held within the format of a symposium, have included past University of Chicago president Hanna Holborn Gray, philosopher Martha Nussbaum, former Council of Economic Advisers Chairman Austan Goolsbee, Nobel Prize winners Milton Friedman, George Stigler, Leon M. Lederman, and essayist Allan Bloom. A compendium of the debate, which has never been won, was published in 2005.

== Background and history ==
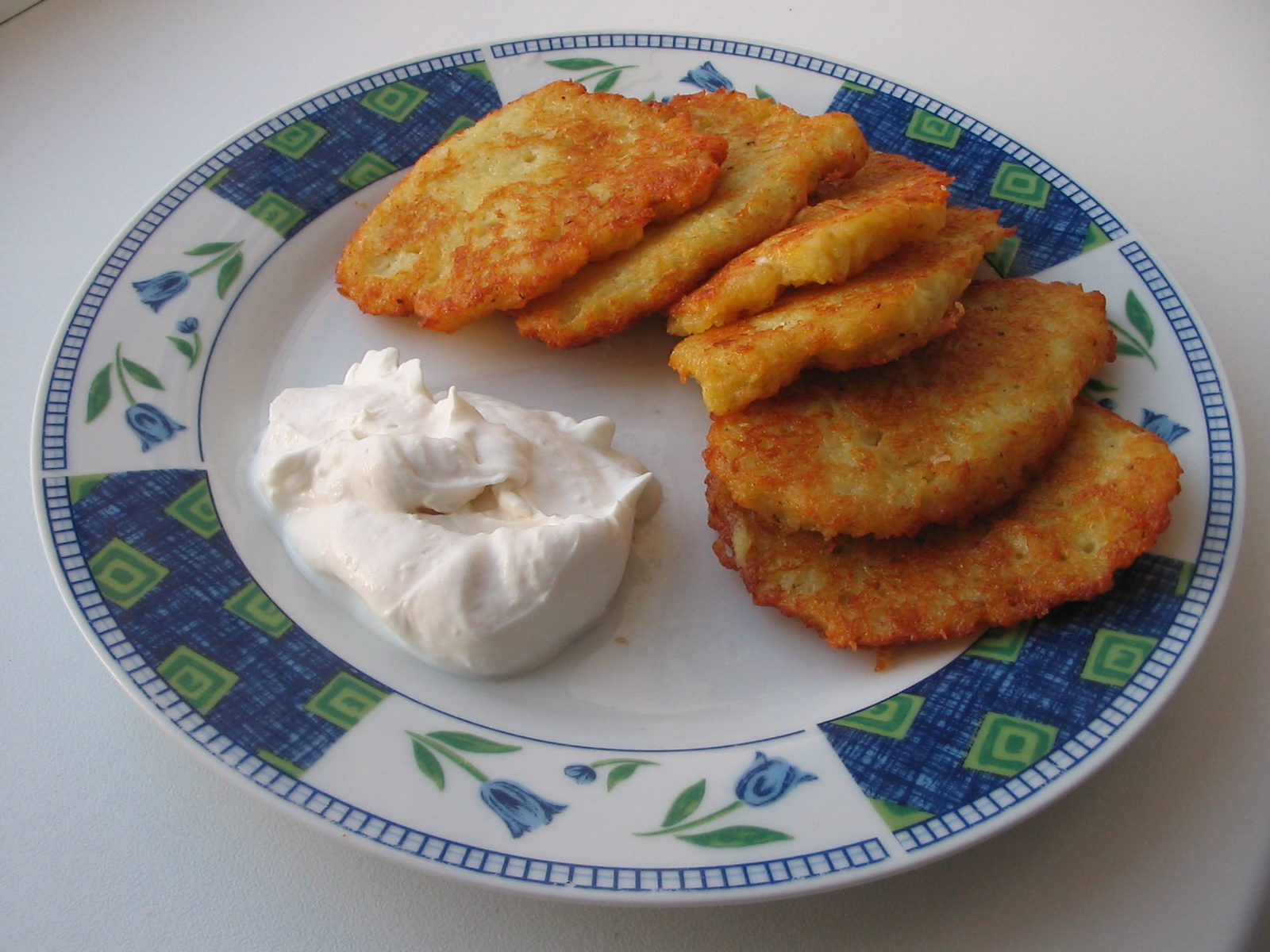
Latkes with sour cream

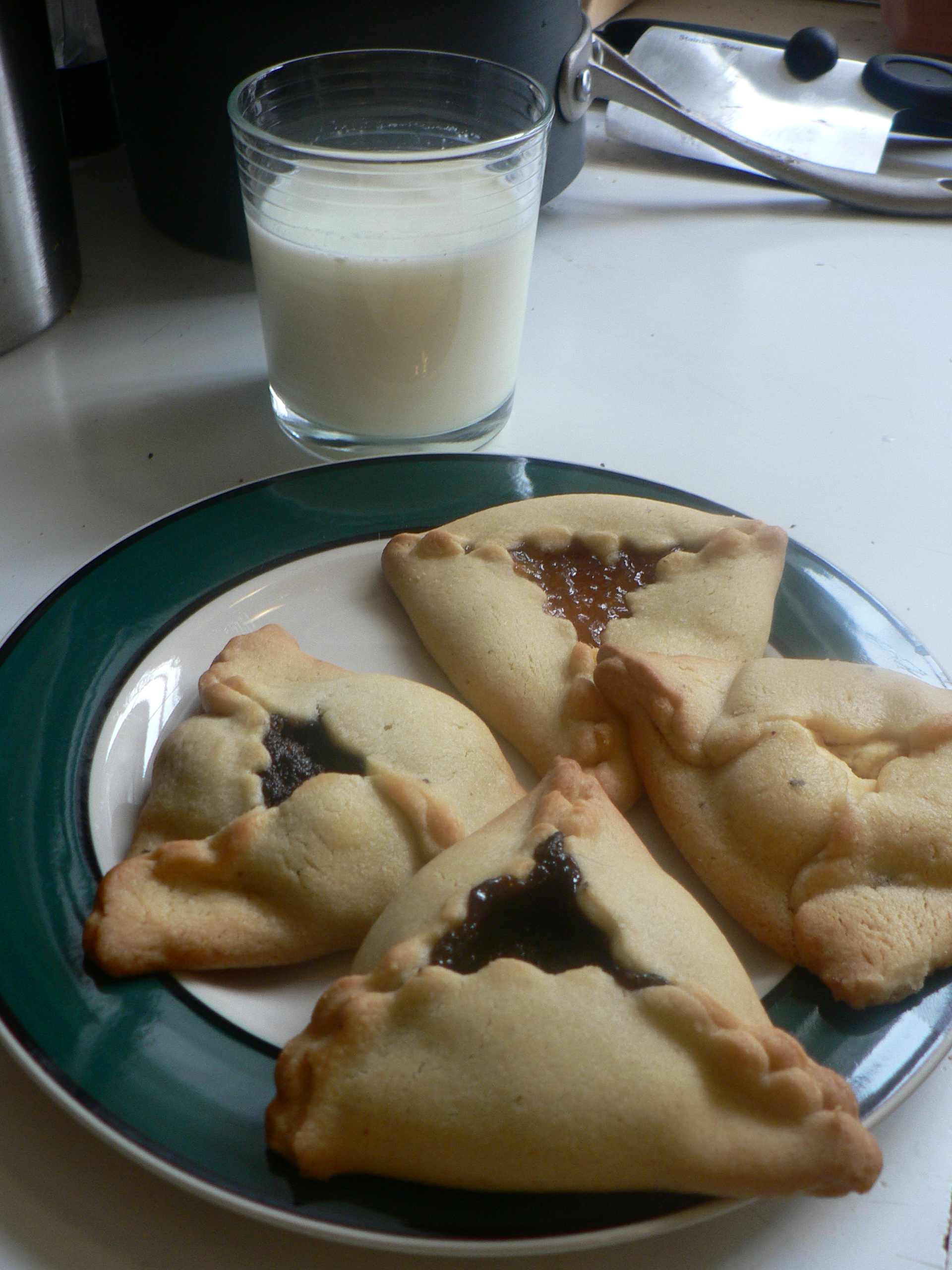
Hamantashen with milk

A latke is a kind of potato pancake traditionally eaten during the Jewish holiday of Hanukkah. Fried in oil, latkes commemorate the holiday miracle in which one day's worth of oil illuminated the temple for eight days. Hamantashen are triangular baked wheat-flour pastries with a sweet filling which are traditionally eaten on the holiday of Purim. They represent the ears or the 3-cornered hat of Haman, the villain of the Purim story in the Biblical book of Esther.

A debate on their relative merits was first held in the winter of 1946 at the University of Chicago chapter house of the Hillel Foundation, sponsored by Rabbi Maurice Pekarsky. Participants in the debates have included Nobel Prize winners and MacArthur Grant Fellows. After the debate, both foodstuffs are usually served at a reception afterwards, offering debaters and listeners an opportunity to evaluate primary sources.

At the University of Chicago the debate had been moderated by philosophy professor Ted Cohen for over 25 years until his death in March 2014. Several long-standing customs are observed at the University of Chicago: arguments are encouraged to be made using the specific technical language of their discipline, participants must present themselves in academic regalia, the debaters must include at least one non-Jew, and the debaters must have gained a Ph.D. or an equivalent advanced degree . However at the 77th debate at the University of Chicago on March 24th 2024, Terry Johnson, one of the debaters argued with only a Masters in chemical engineering, becoming the first non-Ph.D. holding scholar to debate.

== Commentary ==
The events have attracted commentary from a number of individuals. Aaron David Miller, who served as a peace negotiator between Israeli and Palestinian authorities, noted that the critical feature of the debate is that it is intractable, but that the event is "simply too important to abandon." Discussing the event's original purpose at the University of Chicago, Ruth Fredman Cernea observed that scholarly life discouraged exploration of Jewish traditions and did not facilitate ethnic relationships between students and faculty: "the event provided a rare opportunity for faculty to reveal their hidden Jewish souls and poke fun at the high seriousness of everyday academic life." On a practical note, Cernea commented that examinations and term papers would cause stress in the student body and that the event served to help alleviate such tension toward the end of the fall. She also argued that the debates reflected broad ethnic changes in the United States when they were founded, and represented gradual integration.

== Notable debates and arguments ==
The debaters represent a range of academic disciplines. Some of the entries are described below:

- Ted Cohen concluded an analysis of how correct philosophical reasoning would lead one to the latke by explaining, "A world without hamantashen would be a wretched world. A world without hamantashen might be unbearable. But a world without latkes is unthinkable."
- Hanna Gray discussed the silence of Machiavelli on the subject; noting that "The silence of a wise man is always meaningful", she comes to the conclusion that Machiavelli was Jewish, and like all wise people, for the latke.
- Isaac Abella, professor of physics, asserts that "Which is Better: the Latke or the Hamantash?" is an invalid question, since it does not exhibit the necessary property of universality, is culturally biased, implies gender specificity, exhibits geographical chauvinism, and appeals to special interests.
- Michael Silverstein, professor in anthropology, linguistics, and psychology, argued that it is not mere coincidence that the English translation of the letters on the dreidl spells out T-U-M-S. He cites this as evidence that "God may play dice with the universe, but not with Mrs. Schmalowitz’s lukshen kugl, nor especially with her latkes and homntashen".
- Professor Wendy Doniger of the divinity school, in a carefully footnoted paper entitled "The Archetypal Hamentasch: A Feminist Mythology", asserts that hamentaschen are a womb equivalent, and were worshiped in early matriarchal societies.
- In the debate at MIT, Robert J. Silbey, dean of its School of Science, cited Google, which returned 380,000 hits on a search for "latke" and only 62,000 for "hamantaschen". Silbey also claimed that latkes, not hamentashen, are the dark matter thought to make up over 21 percent of the mass of the universe.
- Allan Bloom noted a possible conspiracy involving the Manischewitz company and the University of Chicago Business School.
- An entry by economist Milton Friedman discussed "The Latke and the Hamantash at the Fifty-Yard Line".
- Criminal lawyer and Professor Alan Dershowitz, during a debate at Harvard University, accused the latke of increasing the United States' dependence on oil.
- In the fifth debate at Johns Hopkins University in December 2010, professors Jonathan Flombaum and Hollis Robbins made a case for the latke on semiotic and philosophical grounds, drawing upon Spinoza and Jacques Derrida to emphasize the latke's différance and to argue that its joyous heterogeneity made it the better holiday food.
- In the 2011 debate at MIT, particle physicist Allan Adams presented preliminary data from the LHC—the Latke Hamantash Collider—allegedly providing evidence for Latke Theory.
- In 2005, when he was President of Princeton University, Harold Tafler Shapiro argued the hamantaschen's superiority by pointing out the epicurean significance of the "edible triangle" by arguing that Freud confused the hamantasch for the "Oedipal triangle".
- In a memorable debate in the early 1970s at the Clanton Park Synagogue Purim Party in Toronto, Canada, attorneys Aaron Weinstock and Meyer Feldman - debating in their formal legal robes and wigs - debated with much hilarity. The result was a draw.
- In debates concerning law, participants have quoted from the majority opinion of Justice Blackmun in the case County of Allegheny v. ACLU, which said: "It is also a custom to serve potato pancakes or other fried foods on Chanukah because the oil in which they are fried is, by tradition, a reminder of the miracle of Chanukah." The Supreme Court has given no such recognition to the hamantash.
- The 2014 University of Chicago debate featured Chemistry professor Aaron Dinner, who argued from a standpoint of energy efficiency, that the latke is eight times more fuel efficient than the hamantash.
- Yiddishist and professor of computer science Raphael Finkel has pointed out that in the rabbinic literature there are extensive hallachic discussions concerning latkes but almost no mention of hamantashen.
- Because of the proximity to Passover of the date of the 2012 debate at St. Mary's College of Maryland, Professor Josh Grossman initially adopted a third side in the debate: matzo. Upon further consideration, he promptly conceded.

== Debates at other institutions ==
Latke–Hamantash Debates have been held at several other universities and institutions including:

- University of Denver
- Brandeis University
- University of Wisconsin–Madison
- University of Michigan
- Harvard University
- Massachusetts Institute of Technology
- Princeton University
- Williams College
- University of Minnesota
- Mount Holyoke College
- University of Massachusetts
- Graduate Theological Union
- Bowdoin College
- University of Connecticut
- Swarthmore College
- Jewish Community Center (JCC) - Krakow, Poland
- University of South Florida - A USF Hillel Program
- Johns Hopkins University
