= Kevin Thompson (philosopher) =

American philosophy professor

Academic background
- Education: University of Memphis (PhD)
- Thesis: The Logical Structure of Civil Society in Hegel's "Grundlinien der Philosophie des Rechts" (1995)

Academic work
- Era: Contemporary philosophy
- Region: Western philosophy
- School or tradition: German Idealism
- Institutions: DePaul University

Kevin Brian Thompson is a professor of philosophy at DePaul University. Thompson was the president of Hegel Society of America from 2022 to 2024.

== Life and works ==
=== Selected publications ===
==== Monographs ====
- Thompson, Kevin (2019). Hegel?s Theory of Normativity: The Systematic Foundations of the Philosophical Science of Right. Northwestern University Press. doi:10.2307/j.ctvdjrpqn. ISBN 978-0-8101-3993-0. JSTOR j.ctvdjrpqn.

==== Editorials ====
- Thompson, Kevin; Embree, Lester, eds. (2000). "Phenomenology of the Political". Contributions to Phenomenology. 38. doi:10.1007/978-94-017-2606-1. ISBN 978-90-481-5396-1. ISSN 0923-9545.
- Thompson, Kevin Brian; Zurn, Perry (2021). Intolerable: Writings from Michel Foucault and the Prisons Information Group (1970-1980). University of Minnesota Press. ISBN 978-1-5179-0234-6.
