= Robert R. Williams (philosopher) =

American philosopher (1939–2018)

- Born: 1939
- Died: March 10, 2018 (aged 78–79)

Academic background
- Education: Union Theological Seminary (PhD)
- Thesis: Consciousness and Redemption in the Theology of Friedrich Schleiermacher (1971)

Academic work
- Era: Contemporary philosophy
- Region: Western philosophy
- School or tradition: German Idealism
- Institutions: University of Illinois Chicago

Robert Roy "Bob" Williams (1939 – March 10, 2018) was a professor emeritus of Germanic studies and religious studies at the University of Illinois Chicago.

== Life and works ==
Williams received his PhD from Union Theological Seminary in New York City in 1971 with the dissertation on "Consciousness and Redemption in the Theology of Friedrich Schleiermacher".

He played an important role in reviving interest in the philosophy of Hegel. In 2018 The Owl of Minerva dedicated a whole issue of the journal to the memory of Bob Williams, which contained review of his latest book Hegel on the Proofs and the Personhood of God.

=== Publications ===
==== Monographs ====
- Williams, Robert R. (2017). Hegel on the Proofs and the Personhood of God. doi:10.1093/acprof:oso/9780198795223.001.0001. ISBN 978-0-19-879522-3.
- Williams, Robert R. (2012). Tragedy, Recognition, and the Death of God. doi:10.1093/acprof:oso/9780199656059.001.0001. ISBN 978-0-19-965605-9.
- Williams, Robert R. (1998). Williams, Robert R. (ed.). Hegel's Ethics of Recognition. doi:10.1525/9780520925533. ISBN 978-0-520-92553-3.
- Recognition: Fichte and Hegel on the Other. SUNY Press. January 1992. ISBN 978-0-7914-0857-5.

==== Translations ====
- Hegel, Georg Wilhelm Friedrich (2007). Georg Wilhelm Friedrich Hegel: Lectures on the Philosophy of Spirit 1827-8. Oxford University Press. ISBN 978-0-19-921702-1.
