= Ardis B. Collins =

American philosopher (born 1936)

- Born: 1936 (age 89–90); Houston, Texas

Academic background
- Education: University of Toronto (PhD)
- Thesis: The Doctrine of Being in the Theologia Platonica of Marsilio Ficino: With Special Reference to the Influence of Thomas Aquinas (1968)

Academic work
- Era: 21st-century philosophy
- Region: Western philosophy
- Institutions: Loyola University Chicago
- Main interests: Hegel's philosophy

Ardis Bea Collins (born 1936 Houston, Texas) is an American philosopher and Professor Emerita of Philosophy at Loyola University Chicago. She is known for her works on Hegel's philosophy, specially the Phenomenology, and is Editor-in-chief of the Owl of Minerva. She was the president of Hegel Society of America from 2010 to 2012.

== Life and career ==
Collins was born in Houston, Texas in 1936. She received her B.A. from the University of St. Thomas, Texas in 1957 and her M.A. from the University of Toronto in 1959 and her PhD in 1968 from Toronto as well.

== Books ==
- Collins, Ardis B. (2013). Hegel's Phenomenology: The Dialectical Justification of Philosophy's First Principles. McGill-Queen's University Press. ISBN 978-0-7735-4060-6. JSTOR j.ctt2tt7z9.
- Hegel on the Modern World (ed.) (SUNY Press, 1995)
- Collins, Ardis B. (1974). The Secular is Sacred. doi:10.1007/978-94-010-2022-0. ISBN 978-94-010-2024-4.
