= Joseph C. Flay =

Professor at the Pennsylvania State University

- Born: February 16, 1932; Reading, Pennsylvania
- Died: June 27, 2014 (aged 82); State College, Pennsylvania

Academic background
- Education: University of Southern California (PhD)
- Thesis: Hegel and Dewey and the Problem of Freedom (1965)
- Doctoral advisor: W. H. Werkmeister

Academic work
- Era: Contemporary philosophy
- Region: Western philosophy
- School or tradition: German Idealism
- Institutions: Pennsylvania State University

Joseph Charles Flay (February 16, 1932 Reading, Pennsylvania – June 27, 2014) was an emeritus professor of philosophy at PennState University. He was best known for his work on Hegel.

== Life and works ==
Born in Reading, Pennsylvania, he served in the U.S. Air Force before earning a B.A. from Pennsylvania State University and his Ph.D. in philosophy from University of Southern California, he did his dissertation on "Hegel and Dewey and the Problem of Freedom" under supervision of W. H. Werkmeister. He taught at Penn State from 1963 until retiring in 1994, focusing his research on Hegel and other philosophers. He was married to Bonnie Joanne Stout, they had three children and several grandchildren. Joseph enjoyed family travel, fine wines, and French stamps. He died in State College, Pennsylvania.

=== Selected publications ===
- Hegel's Quest for Certainty. SUNY Press. January 1984. ISBN 978-0-87395-877-6.
