= Sebastian Rand =

American philosophy professor

- Born: Sebastian Gerard Rand

Academic background
- Education: University of Wisconsin-Milwaukee (MA); Northwestern University (PhD)
- Thesis: From a priori Grounding to Conceptual Transformation: The Philosophy of Nature in German Idealism (2006)
- Doctoral advisor: Terry Pinkard (Chair)
- Other advisors: John McCumber, Jacques Derrida, Rolf-Peter Horstmann, Catherine Malabou

Academic work
- Era: Contemporary philosophy
- Region: Western philosophy
- School or tradition: German Idealism
- Institutions: Georgia State University

Sebastian Gerard Rand is a professor of philosophy at Georgia State University.

== Life and works ==
Rand holds a Ph.D. in Philosophy from Northwestern University, earned in 2006. Prior to that, they completed an M.A. in Philosophy at the University of Wisconsin-Milwaukee in 1997 and received a B.A. in the College of Letters from Wesleyan University in 1995.

In his article "What's Wrong with Rex? Hegel on Animal Defect and Individuality" Rand argues that for Hegel, animals can not be normatively evaluated on the basis of species-specific standards. This position has been criticized by Nicolás García Mills, whom along with Mark Alznauer argues that animals are in fact normatively evaluable for Hegel.

=== Selected publications ===
==== Translations ====
- Malabou, Catherine; Rand, Sebastian (2008). What Should We Do with Our Brain?. Fordham University Press. ISBN 978-0-8232-2952-9.

==== Editorials ====
- Moyar, Dean; Padgett Walsh, Kate; Rand, Sebastian (2022-11-03). Hegel's Philosophy of Right: Critical Perspectives on Freedom and History (1 ed.). London: Routledge. doi:10.4324/9781003081036. ISBN 978-1-003-08103-6.

==== Articles ====
- "The Logic of Life: Apriority, Singularity and Death in Ng's Vitalist Hegel". Hegel Bulletin. 42 (3): 430–453. 2021. doi:10.1017/hgl.2021.21. ISSN 2051-5367.
- "The Importance and Relevance of Hegel's "Philosophy of Nature"". The Review of Metaphysics. 61 (2): 379–400. 2007. ISSN 0034-6632.
