= Lawrence Stepelevich =

American philosopher (1930–2022)

Lawrence Stanley Stepelevich (July 22, 1930 – August 14, 2022) was an American philosopher associated with a renewed interest in the works of Georg Wilhelm Friedrich Hegel, particularly since the fall of the Soviet Union, with less emphasis placed on Karl Marx's interpretations than had previously been the case. Stepelevich also wrote on the works of Max Stirner.

== Education and career ==
Stepelevich graduated from the University of Albuquerque in 1954. He went to the Catholic University of America for graduate study, earning a master's degree in 1957 and completing his PhD in 1963 on "Henri Bergson's Concept of Man: An Exposition and Critique". He joined the Villanova University faculty in 1964 retired in 1996 and became a professor emeritus of philosophy there.

== Contributions ==
Stepelevich is the author of Max Stirner on the Path of Doubt (2020). He is the editor of books including The Capitalist Reader (1977), The Young Hegelians: An Anthology (1983), Hegel's Philosophy of Action (1983). and Selected Essays On G W F Hegel (1993). He is the translator into English of Bruno Bauer's The Trumpet of the Last Judgement against Hegel, the Atheist and Antichrist: An Ultimatum (1989).

From 1977 to 1996 Stepelevich was editor of The Owl of Minerva, the journal of Hegel Society of America. He was president of the society for the 1996–1998 term.
