= Angelica Nuzzo =

Professor of philosophy

Academic background
- Education: Scuola Normale Superiore di Pisa (PhD)
- Thesis: Il problema della forma assoluta nella scienza della logica di G.W.F. Hegel (1987)
- Doctoral advisor: Nicola Badaloni

Academic work
- Era: Contemporary philosophy
- Region: Western philosophy
- School or tradition: German Idealism
- Institutions: Brooklyn College

Angelica Nuzzo is a professor of philosophy at Brooklyn College and Graduate Center of the City University of New York (CUNY). Nuzzo was the president of Hegel Society of America from 2014 to 2016.

== Life and work ==
Nuzzo received her first PhD in philosophy from Scuola Normale Superiore di Pisa and her second PhD from Heidelberg University. She completed her postdoctoral studies in philosophy at the Scuola Normale Superiore. Before joining the City University of New York, Nuzzo was an assistant professor at DePaul University, Ricercatore at the University of L'Aquila and assistant visiting professor at the Heidelberg University. In 2004 she was the receiver of Research Fellowship Programme from the Alexander von Humboldt Foundation.

Her book Approaching Hegel’s Logic, Obliquely: Melville, Molière, Beckett, was the winner of the hegelpd-prize in 2020 and was subject of a book symposium by Verifiche in 2022. In the book Nuzzo circumvents contemporary debates in Hegel scholarship, namely the metaphysical, epistemological or ontological intake of Hegel's Logic. Instead Nuzzo looks at the work through an oblique lens, for example in the first part of the book she argues for the affinity between the Logic and Aristotle's account of "poetic action" in the Poetics (7, 1450b).

=== Selected publications ===
- Nuzzo, Angelica (2018). Approaching Hegel's Logic, Obliquely. doi:10.1515/9781438472065. ISBN 978-1-4384-7206-5.
- Nuzzo, Angelica (2013). Hegel on Religion and Politics. doi:10.1353/book23098. ISBN 978-1-4384-4567-0.
- Nuzzo, Angelica (2012). Memory, History, Justice in Hegel. doi:10.1057/9780230371033. ISBN 978-1-349-35073-5.
- Hegel and the Analytic Tradition. Bloomsbury. 19 November 2009. ISBN 978-1-4411-7095-8.
- Ideal Embodiment: Kant's Theory of Sensibility. Indiana University Press. 28 October 2008. ISBN 978-0-253-22015-8.
- Nuzzo, Angelica (2005). Kant and the Unity of Reason. Purdue University Press. ISBN 978-1-55753-188-9. JSTOR j.ctt6wq4kj.
