= Frederick G. Weiss =

American retired professor

- Born: 1939 (age 86–87)

Academic background
- Education: University of Virginia (M.A., PhD)
- Thesis: Hegel's Conception of Truth: An Interpretation and Criticism (1974)
- Doctoral advisor: W. H. Werkmeister

Academic work
- Era: Contemporary philosophy
- Region: Western philosophy
- School or tradition: German Idealism
- Institutions: Purdue University

Frederick Gustav Weiss (born 1939) is a retired professor of philosophy at Purdue University. He is one of the founding members of Hegel Society of America and the first editor of its journal The Owl of Minerva.

== Life and works ==
Weiss received his education at Iona College and the University of Virginia. He received his M.A. from the University of Virginia in 1964 on "Hegel on Aristotle's de Anima: A Study in Interpretation" and his PhD in 1974 on "Hegel's Conception of Truth: An Interpretation and Criticism" from the same institution. Over the course of his academic career, he taught philosophy at several distinguished institutions, including Purdue University, Indiana University, Florida State University, and The Citadel.

=== Selected publications ===
==== Monographs ====
- Hegel's Critique of Aristotle's Philosophy of Mind. 1969. doi:10.1007/978-94-015-0670-0. ISBN 978-94-015-0174-3.
- Hegel in Comparative Literature. St. John's University. 1970.

==== Editorials ====
- Beyond Epistemology. 1974. doi:10.1007/978-94-010-2016-9. ISBN 978-90-247-1584-8.
- Hegel and the History of Philosophy. 1975. doi:10.1007/978-94-010-1657-5. ISBN 978-90-247-1712-5.
- Hegel, the essential writings. 1974. ISBN 978-0-06-139715-8.

==== Articles ====
- "Recent Work on Hegel". American Philosophical Quarterly. 8 (3): 203–222. 1971. JSTOR 20009400.
- "Hegel studies and celebrations on the second centenary of his birth". International Journal for Philosophy of Religion. 1 (3): 192–193. 1970. doi:10.1007/BF00136242. JSTOR 40019159.
