= The Owl of Minerva (journal) =

- Discipline: Philosophy
- Language: English
- Edited by: Andrew A. Davis

Publication details
- History: 1969–present
- Publisher: Philosophy Documentation Center (United States)
- Frequency: Biannual

Standard abbreviations
- ISO 4: Owl Minerva

Indexing
- ISSN: 0030-7580 (print); 2153-3385 (web)
- LCCN: 89649464
- OCLC no.: 2052944

Links
- Journal homepage; Online access

The Owl of Minerva is a biannual peer-reviewed academic journal focusing on the work and legacy of Georg Wilhelm Friedrich Hegel. it is the official journal of the Hegel Society of America.

As John W. Burbidge has noted, along with Hegel Bulletin, The Owl of Minerva played a major role as a discussion ground, in revival of the contemporary Hegel studies in the English-speaking world.

== History ==
After the formation of Hegel Society of America, The Owl of Minerva was conceived as the society's newsletter, to be published quarterly, as a service to its members. The executive council of the society elected Frederick G. Weiss as the journal's first editor. Since the summer of 1969 the journal has published approximately 1,000 articles, reviews, discussions, and English translations of scholarly work on Hegel's thought.

== Editors ==
- 1969 - 1977: Frederick G. Weiss
- 1977 - 1996: Lawrence Stepelevich
- 1996 - 2026: Ardis B. Collins
- 2026 - present: Andrew A. Davis

== Indexing ==
The Owl of Minerva is indexed in Academic Search, ArticleFirst, Current Abstracts, Expanded Academic ASAP, Index Philosophicus, InfoTrac OneFile, International Bibliography of Periodical Literature (IBZ), International Philosophical Bibliography, MLA International Bibliography, ERIH PLUS, Periodicals Index Online, The Philosopher's Index, Philosophy Research Index, PhilPapers, and TOC Premier.

== See also ==
- Studia Hegeliana
- Hegel Bulletin
- Hegel-Studien
- Hegel-Jahrbuch
- List of philosophy journals
