= Jere Surber =

American philosophy professor

- Born: 1948 (age 77–78)

Academic background
- Education: Pennsylvania State University (PhD)
- Thesis: Language, Time and System: An Examination of Hegel's Conception of Language (1974)
- Doctoral advisor: Carl G. Vaught
- Other advisors: Henry W. Johnstone, Carl R. Hausman, Richards A. Gotshalk

Academic work
- Era: Contemporary philosophy
- Region: Western philosophy
- School or tradition: German Idealism
- Institutions: University of Denver
- Website: https://liberalarts.du.edu/about/people/jere-p-surber-0

Jere Paul O'Neil Surber (born 1948) is an emeritus professor of philosophy at the University of Denver. He was the president of Hegel Society of America from 2016 to 2022.

== Education ==
Surber earned a BA in Biology, Philosophy, and Psychology from Texas Christian University in 1969, followed by an MA in Philosophy from the same institution in 1970. He completed a PhD in Philosophy in 1974 through a joint program between Pennsylvania State University and the University of Bonn.

== Selected publications ==
=== Monographs ===
- Language and German Idealism: Fichte's Linguistic Philosophy. Bloomsbury Academic. 1996-02-01. ISBN 978-1-57392-407-8.
- Culture and Critique: An Introduction To The Critical Discourses Of Cultural Studies. Routledge. 2018-10-08. doi:10.4324/9780429501173. ISBN 978-0-429-50117-3.

=== Translations ===
- Hegel, Georg Wilhelm Friedrich (1978). The Difference Between the Fichtean and Schellingian Systems of Philosophy. Translated by Surber, Jere Paul. Ridgeview Publishing Company. ISBN 978-0-917930-12-6.

=== Edited volumes ===
- Hegel and Language. State University of New York Press. 2006. doi:10.1515/9780791481769. ISBN 978-0-7914-6756-5.

=== Articles ===
- "Hegel's Speculative Sentence". Hegel-Studien. 10: 211–230. 1975. ISSN 0073-1587. JSTOR 26595996.
- "Heidegger's Critique of Hegel's Notion of Time". Philosophy and Phenomenological Research. 39 (3): 358–377. 1979. doi:10.2307/2106492. ISSN 0031-8205. JSTOR 2106492.
- "Hegel's Philosophy of Language: The Unwritten Volume", A Companion to Hegel, John Wiley & Sons, Ltd, 2011, pp. 243–261, doi:10.1002/9781444397161.ch11, ISBN 978-1-4443-9716-1
