= Ted Cohen (philosopher) =

American philosopher (1939–2014)

- Born: 1939
- Died: March 14, 2014 (aged 74–75)
- Spouse: Andy Austin Cohen
- Awards: Pushcart Prize

Education
- Education: University of Chicago (AB); Harvard University (MA, PhD)
- Thesis: The Grammar of Taste (1972)
- Doctoral advisor: Rogers Albritton; Stanley Cavell

Philosophical work
- Era: Contemporary philosophy
- Region: Western philosophy
- School: Analytic philosophy
- Institutions: University of Chicago
- Doctoral students: Mark Johnson
- Notable students: Rachel Zuckert
- Main interests: Philosophy of art

Ted Cohen (1939 - March 14, 2014) was an American philosopher and professor of philosophy at the University of Chicago. His interests included philosophy of art, history of the philosophy of art, especially in the 18th-century, and the philosophy of language.

== Education and career ==
Cohen received his Bachelor of Arts (BA) from the University of Chicago in 1962, a Master of Arts (MA) from Harvard in 1965 and a PhD from Harvard in 1972 (titled: The grammar of taste). He taught at the University of Chicago from 1967. Cohen worked mainly in the philosophy of art. He received the Quantrell Award.

Cohen served as president of the American Philosophical Association (2006–2007) and the American Society for Aesthetics (1997–1998).

He was also the moderator of the Latke–Hamantash Debate at the University of Chicago for 25 years until his death.

== Selected books ==
- Essays in Kant's Aesthetics, edited with Paul Guyer (University of Chicago Press, 1982)
- Jokes: Philosophical Thoughts on Joking Matters (University of Chicago Press, 1999).
- Thinking of Others: On the Talent for Metaphor (Princeton University Press, 2008).
- Serious Larks: The Philosophy of Ted Cohen, edited and introduced by Daniel Herwitz. (University of Chicago Press, 2018)
