= William Maker =

American philosophy professor (1949–2021)

- Born: 1949
- Died: November 10, 2021 (aged 71–72)

Education
- Education: The New School for Social Research (PhD)
- Thesis: Hegel's Critique of Absolute Knowing: An Interpretation of the "Phenomenology of Spirit" (1978)
- Doctoral advisor: Albert Hofstadter, K. R. Dove

Philosophical work
- Era: Contemporary philosophy
- Region: Western philosophy
- School: German Idealism
- Institutions: Clemson University

William Anthony Maker, also known as Bill Maker (1949 - November 10, 2021), was a professor of philosophy at the Department of Philosophy and Religion in Clemson University. Maker was the president of Hegel Society of America from 2008 to 2010.

== Life and works ==
Maker received his PhD in philosophy from The New School for Social Research in 1978. He did his dissertation on Hegel's Critique of Absolute Knowing: An Interpretation of the "Phenomenology of Spirit".

Along with Richard Dien Winfield, Kenley R. Dove and Stephen Houlgate, Maker is said to defend a 'presuppositionless' and 'non-foundational' reading of Hegel's Logic.

=== Selected publications ===
==== Monographs ====
- Philosophy without Foundations: Rethinking Hegel. SUNY Press. 11 October 1994. ISBN 978-0-7914-2100-0.

==== Editorials ====
- Hegel and Aesthetics. SUNY Press. 11 May 2000. ISBN 978-0-7914-4552-5.
- Hegel on Economics and Freedom. Mercer University Press. 1987. ISBN 978-0-86554-256-3.
