= Jeffrey Church =

Political theory professor (born 1978)

- Awards: 2013 APSA First Book Award

Academic background
- Education: Ursinus College (BA)
- Alma mater: University of Notre Dame (PhD)
- Thesis: Divided Individualism: On the Political Individual in Hegel and Nietzsche (2008)
- Doctoral advisor: Dana Villa, Catherine Zuckert

Academic work
- Era: Contemporary political theory
- Region: Western philosophy
- School or tradition: German philosophy
- Institutions: University of Wisconsin–Madison; University of Houston
- Website: https://polisci.wisc.edu/staff/church-jeffrey/

Jeffrey Church (born 1978) is a political theorist at the University of Wisconsin–Madison. Church served as the vice-president of Hegel Society of America from 2022 to 2024.

== Life and works ==
Church's first book publication Infinite Autonomy was the winner of American Political Science Association's "First Book Award" in 2013.

Before joining UW–Madison in 2025, Church was a professor of political science at University of Houston.

=== Publications ===
==== Monographs ====
- Church, Jeffrey (2022-08-21). Kant, Liberalism, and the Meaning of Life (1 ed.). Oxford University PressNew York. doi:10.1093/oso/9780197633182.001.0001. ISBN 978-0-19-763318-2.
- Church, Jeffrey (2015-10-01). Infinite Autonomy: The Divided Individual in the Political Thought of G. W. F. Hegel and Friedrich Nietzsche. Penn State University Press. doi:10.1515/9780271061627. ISBN 978-0-271-06162-7.
- Church, Jeffrey (2015). Nietzsche's Culture of Humanity: Beyond Aristocracy and Democracy in the Early Period. Cambridge: Cambridge University Press. doi:10.1017/cbo9781316341322. ISBN 978-1-107-12026-6.

==== Translations ====
- Fichte, J. G.; Church, Jeffrey; Schön, Anna Marisa (2021-03-01). Contribution to the Correction of the Public's Judgments on the French Revolution. SUNY Press. doi:10.1515/9781438482187. ISBN 978-1-4384-8218-7.
