= Johann Friedrich Zückert =

German physician (1737–1778)

Johann Friedrich Zückert (19 December 1737 – 1 May 1778) was a German physician.
