= Rachel Zuckert =

American philosopher

- Born: Rachel Elizabeth Zuckert; January 6, 1969 (age 57)
- Parents: Catherine Zuckert; Michael Zuckert
- Awards: NEH Fellowship; Alexander von Humboldt Foundation Fellowship; Monograph Prize; Andrew Mellon Fellowship; John Fisher Award

Education
- Education: University of Chicago (PhD)
- Thesis: Purposiveness, Time, and Unity: A Reading of "The Critique of Judgment" (2000)
- Doctoral advisor: Robert Pippin
- Other advisors: Karl Ameriks; Ted Cohen; Michael Forster

Philosophical work
- Era: Contemporary philosophy
- Region: Western philosophy
- School: Kantianism
- Institutions: Northwestern University
- Main interests: Aesthetics

Rachel Elizabeth Zuckert (born January 6, 1969) is an American philosopher who is professor of philosophy at Northwestern University.

She is known for her expertise on Kantian philosophy. Zuckert is a former president of the North American Kant Society.

Zuckert is one of three daughters born to political philosophers Catherine and Michael Zuckert.

== Books ==
- Kant on Beauty and Biology: An Interpretation of the Critique of Judgment, Cambridge University Press, 2007.
- Herder's Naturalist Aesthetics, Cambridge University Press, 2019.
