= Quentin Lauer =

American philosopher (1917–1997)

The Reverend Quentin Lauer SJ
- Born: April 1, 1917; New York City, U.S.
- Died: March 9, 1997 (aged 79)
- Awards: Aquinas Medal (1985)

Education
- Education: Saint Louis University (AB, MA); University of Paris (PhD)
- Thesis: La genèse de l'intentionnalité dans la philosophie de Husserl (1954)

Philosophical work
- Era: Contemporary philosophy
- Region: Western philosophy
- School: Phenomenology, German idealism
- Institutions: Fordham University
- Notable students: Kenley R. Dove; David Kolb
- Main interests: Philosophy of religion

Joseph Quentin Lauer (April 1, 1917 – March 9, 1997) was an American Jesuit Catholic priest, philosopher and Hegel scholar. Lauer's academic work helped introduce Hegel's thought to the American philosophical community. He was President of the American Philosophical Association, Eastern Division from 1985 to 1986, and a President of the Hegel Society of America. Quentin Lauer was also a scholar of Edmund Husserl. He was a professor of philosophy at Fordham University from 1954 to 1990. Important works by Lauer which helped disseminate the ideas of Hegel and Husserl in the United States include: A Reading of Hegel's Phenomenology of Spirit (1977), The Triumph of Subjectivity (1958) and Edmund Husserl: Phenomenology and the Crisis of Philosophy (1965).

== Life and academic career ==
Quentin Lauer was born in Brooklyn, New York City, on April 1, 1917. At the age of 18, Lauer joined the Jesuit novitiate, entering the seminary of the Society of Jesus in Poughkeepsie, New York. This began his lifelong journey with the Society of Jesus, the order in which he would be ordained in 1948, after earning his AB and MA (1943) from St. Louis University.

During his time at St. Louis, Lauer became exposed to the ongoing debates within Thomism centering around interpretation of the metaphysics of St. Thomas Aquinas. The interpretation of St. Thomas's metaphysics presented by Etienne Gilson and Jacques Maritain had become prevalent at St. Louis University at this time. Gilson and Maritain emphasized the "existential" aspect of Thomistic metaphysics and the distinctly philosophical significance of his thought. This conception of Thomism challenged earlier, more strictly theological forms of Thomism.

Lauer was drawn to this revitalized presentation of St. Thomas's thought, though he would distance himself from St. Thomas when he began studying at the Sorbonne, where he would attain a doctorate and the prestigious Docteur ès lettres. Lauer became known in Paris as the "motorcycle philosopher” based on his habit of soaring through the streets of Paris on his motorcycle during the four-year period in which he wrote his dissertation, La genèse de l'intentionnalité dans la philosophie de Husserl.

After finishing his doctorate, Lauer returned to the United States, taking a position at Fordham University, where he would continue to work and live for virtually the rest of his life. Quentin Lauer would help introduce phenomenology in United States, which had, up to that time, had little impact on American philosophy had fostered little in terms of academic research. Aron Gurwitsch wrote that Lauer had "rendered a valuable service to both the cause of phenomenology and American philosophy" by presenting "the scientific spirit, in a radical sense, which was alive in Husserl". From the mid fifties to sixties, Lauer would publish several books and articles on Husserl. However, Lauer would eventually become disillusioned with this philosophical system, seeing it as failing to create a dialogue between ideas and history, ethics and religion. Lauer became briefly engaged in dialogue with Marxism, co-publishing with French Marxist Roger Garaudy in 1968 A Christian-Communist Dialogue (published in France as Marxistes et chrétiens face à face; Peuvent-ils construire ensemble l'avenir?). This work was noted for successfully presenting a frank and genuine dialogue between Christians and Marxists.

After this rather brief engagement with French Marxism, Lauer began his study of the thought of Georg Wilhelm Friedrich Hegel, for which he devoted the rest of his career. He wrote four books and dozens of papers on Hegel, including Hegel's Idea of Philosophy (1976), Studies in Hegelian Dialectic (1977), and Hegel's Concept of God (1982).

Lauer also initiated and became General Editor in the SUNY series of Hegelian studies, which published works by international Hegel scholars, including William Desmond and H. S. Harris. As General Editor of the SUNY series, Lauer helped encourage other publishing houses in America to publish works on Hegel at a time when many were not willing to. Lauer was elected President of the American Philosophical Association, Eastern Division in 1985. Lauer was elected as a "pluralist" candidate and partially as response to hegemony of analytic philosophy in America. At this time some members of the APA began to formerly protest the monolithic hold that analytic philosophers had in the APA and in most American philosophy departments. Lauer's presidential address was titled, "Why Be Good?"

After a couple years of illness, Quentin Lauer died on March 9, 1997.
