= Mark Tunick =

American theorist and professor

Academic background
- Education: MIT, University of California, Berkeley
- Thesis: The Justification of Llegal Punishment: Hegel's "Rechtsphilosophie" as Practical Theory (1990)
- Doctoral advisor: Hanna Pitkin

Mark Evan Tunick is a political theorist and professor of political science at Florida Atlantic University.

== Education ==
Tunick received his MA and PhD from the University of California, Berkeley. His PhD dissertation was entitled "The Justification of Legal Punishment: Hegel's "Rechtsphilosophie" as Practical Theory" in 1990 under direction of Hanna Pitkin. Before that he earned to bachelor of sciences in political science and management from MIT.

== Selected publications ==
- Tunick, Mark (1992). Hegel's Political Philosophy: Interpreting the Practice of Legal Punishment. Princeton University Press. JSTOR j.ctv1ddczvg.
- Tunick, Mark (1992). Punishment: Theory and Practice (1 ed.). University of California Press. doi:10.2307/jj.8501340. ISBN 978-0-520-91231-1.
- Tunick, Mark (2021-03-09). Practices and Principles: Approaches to Ethical and Legal Judgment. Princeton University Press. doi:10.2307/j.ctv1ddczvg. ISBN 978-0-691-22743-6.

=== Articles ===
- Tunick, Mark (1991). "Hegel's Justification of Hereditary Monarchy". History of Political Thought. 12 (3): 481–496. ISSN 0143-781X.
- Tunick, Mark (1996). "Is Kant a Retributivist?". History of Political Thought. 17 (1): 60–78. ISSN 0143-781X.
- Tunick, Mark (1998). "Hegel on Justified Disobedience". Political Theory. 26 (4): 514–535. ISSN 0090-5917.
