= George Kline =

American philosopher and translator

- Born: George Louis Kline; March 3, 1921; Galesburg, Illinois, U.S.
- Died: October 21, 2014 (aged 93); Anderson, South Carolina, U.S.

Education
- Education: Boston University (no degree); Columbia University (AB, MA, PhD)
- Thesis: Spinoza in Soviet Philosophy: A Series of Essays, Selected, Translated, and with an Introduction

Philosophical work
- Era: 20th-century philosophy
- Region: Western philosophy
- School: Continental philosophy
- Institutions: Columbia University; University of Chicago; Bryn Mawr College; Rutgers University; Johns Hopkins University; University of Pennsylvania; Haverford College; Swarthmore College
- Doctoral students: Shaun Gallagher
- Main interests: Russian philosophy, ethics, political philosophy, philosophy of religion, Marxism, process philosophy, Russian poetry
- Notable ideas: Nietzschean Marxism

George Louis Kline (March 3, 1921 – October 21, 2014) was a philosopher, translator (esp. of Russian philosophy and poetry), and prominent American specialist in Russian and Soviet philosophy. He is particularly noted for his authoritative studies on Spinoza, Hegel, and Whitehead. He was President of the Hegel Society of America (1984–86) and President of the Metaphysical Society of America (1985–86). He also made notable contributions to the study of Marx and the Marxist tradition.

== Early life ==
Kline attended Boston University for three years (1938–41), but his education was interrupted by service in the U.S. Army Air Corps during WW II, for which he was awarded the Distinguished Flying Cross.

== Career ==
After the war, he completed his undergraduate education with honors at Columbia College, Columbia University (1947), followed by graduate degrees at Columbia University (M.A. 1948; Ph.D. 1950). He taught philosophy at Columbia University 1950–52 and 1953–59 and was a visiting assistant professor at the University of Chicago, 1952–53. He moved to Bryn Mawr College (Bryn Mawr, Pennsylvania) in 1959, initially teaching in both the philosophy and the Russian departments. He was appointed full Professor of Philosophy in 1961, becoming Milton C. Nahm Professor of Philosophy from 1981 until his retirement in 1991. Afterwards, Kline served as a professor of philosophy at Clemson University, South Carolina (1992–93). He also taught one-semester courses at Rutgers University, Johns Hopkins University, the University of Pennsylvania, Haverford College and Swarthmore College.

Beginning in 1952, at the University of Chicago, Kline first taught his famous course on "Russian Ethical and Social Theory"; it was subsequently taught at Columbia University through the 1950s, at Bryn Mawr College from 1960, and at a number of other institutions over the years. He also taught, more or less continuously, courses on the history of Russian philosophy, Russian and Soviet Marxism, and a number of courses on Russian literature.

The entire field of Russian philosophy as an object of study in America has been shaped to a remarkable degree by the efforts of Kline himself over the course of a long career, beginning with his first publications in 1949: "Dostoevsky's Grand Inquisitor and the Soviet Regime," Occidental (NY), no. 2, and "A Note on Soviet Logic," Journal of Philosophy, v. 46, p. 228. The textual precision, historical learning, and depth of insight found in Kline's own numerous studies of Russian and Soviet philosophy over several decades have served as a model of serious scholarship on these topics for many other researchers. He is also responsible for making available in English some of the most important reference works in the field, including the English translation of Zenkovsky's History of Russian Philosophy, and (with others) Russian Philosophy, a 3-vol. anthology of original translations of Russian philosophical texts, continuously in print from 1965 to the present.

== Works in Slavic studies ==
Kline has also supplied a large number of entries on Russian philosophers for a variety of philosophical encyclopedias over many years. He has written approximately 75 reviews of other scholars' works on Russian and Soviet philosophy as well as of new Soviet philosophical works. For example, during the 1950s Kline reviewed approximately thirty recent Soviet publications in the fields of formal logic, philosophy of logic, and philosophy of mathematics, principally for the Journal of Symbolic Logic, as the field of formal logic was opening up in the U.S.S.R. He has also published several authoritative bibliographies of works in Russian, and also in other languages, concerning the history of Russian thought and culture, as well as a bibliography of Brodsky's published writings. Finally, Kline's skills as an editor are legendary. He contributed his services to a great many publishing ventures connected with Russian and Soviet philosophy, including the Sovietica series of monographs and the journal Studies in Soviet Thought. On a personal level, he most generously assisted in the editing of other scholars' drafts of works in philosophy, intellectual history, literature and literary criticism, and has been a constant source of encouragement and support for younger scholars. In all of these ways Kline has placed his own irreplaceable mark upon the entire field.

In 1949-50 Kline was in Paris as a Fulbright Scholar, just as V. V. Zenkovsky's История русской философии (2 vols., 1948 and 1950) was being published there. While in Paris Kline met Zenkovsky and volunteered to translate the History into English, completing it after returning to the U.S. During this process, Zenkovsky introduced revisions and corrections for incorporation into the English translation, so that Kline's translation became the authoritative version of the text. This work became the standard history of Russian philosophy for the next half-century, a crucial reference source for all scholars of Russian philosophy. In addition to Kline's translation of Zenkovsky, another exceptionally important resource for English-speaking students of Russian philosophy has been the comprehensive three-volume collection of original translations of Russian philosophers from the 18th century (Skovoroda) up through early Soviet Marxism (Russian Philosophy, Ed. James M. Edie, James P. Scanlan and Mary-Barbara Zeldin with the Collaboration of George L. Kline, New York: Quadrangle Press, 1965; revised paperback ed. in 1969; reprinted by the University of Tennessee Press in 1976, 1984).

The appearance of these three volumes in the 1960s made it feasible for the first time for instructors in the U.S. and U.K. to teach university courses based upon a representative sampling of the entire history of Russian philosophy, with excellent translations and scholarly introductions for each general section and each philosopher. Kline contributed ten translations to these three volumes, revised a number of others, and advised the editors on which selections should be included. They commented that "Without his help and inspiration the publication of this historical anthology of Russian philosophy could have been neither successfully planned nor achieved."

Kline's own many studies of Russian and Soviet philosophy can be distributed into five main categories:

1. Religious thought in Russia and the Soviet Union
2. Russian and Soviet ethical thought
3. Studies of individual Russian philosophers
4. Marx, the Marxist tradition and Marxism–Leninism
5. Arguments for ethical individualism (though all four of these topics can sometimes be found interwoven in the same work)

The first category is well represented by Religious and Anti-Religious Thought in Russia (Chicago: University of Chicago Pr., 1968), based upon the six Weil Institute Lectures that Kline delivered in Cincinnati in 1964, examining a panorama of attitudes toward religion by ten Russian thinkers, treated in five pairs: Bakunin and Tolstoy (two versions of anarchism, anti-religious and religious), Konstantin Leontiev and Vasily Rozanov (religious neo-conservativisms), Lev Shestov and Nikolai Berdyaev (religious existential-isms), Maxim Gorky and Anatoly Lunacharsky (pseudo-religious "God-Building"), V. I. Lenin and Sergei M. Plekhanov (militant vs. moderate atheism).

== Attitudes toward religion ==
Against the background of this extreme range of attitudes toward religion by various Russian thinkers, Kline concluded by examining three dominant attitudes toward religion in the then-contemporary Soviet Union. They were:

1. The collectivist atheism of Marxist–Leninist ideology, which appeared to function as a kind of secular pseudo-religion for some of its most devout believers, an inversion of normal religious belief.
2. A "scientific-technological Prometheanism," somewhat analogous to Gorky's and Lunacharsky's religion of "God-Building," which apparently inspired substantial numbers of the population, especially among the scientific and engineering elite.
3. A genuinely religious sense of life which was emerging among some poets, writers and artists outside of the church, inspired by earlier writers such as Marina Tsvetaeva, Boris Pasternak and Anna Akhmatova.

== Religious belief in Russia ==
Kline has published a number of important articles on aspects of religious belief in Russia, including "Religious Ferment Among Soviet Intellectuals," in Religion and the Soviet State: A Dilemma of Power ed. M. Hayward and W. C. Fletcher (New York: Praeger, 1969), and especially "Spor o religioznoi filosofii: L. Shestov protiv Vl. Solov'eva," Russkaia reigiozno-filosofskaia mysl; XX veka, ed. N. P. Poltoratzky (Pittsburgh: University of Pittsburgh, 1975) and "Russian Religious Thought" in Nineteenth Century Religious Thought in the West, ed. Ninian Smart, et al. (Cambridge: Cambridge UP, 1985). Russian and Soviet ethical theory have not only been at the center of much of Kline's teaching, but also of many of his publications. In "Changing Attitudes Toward the Individual" (in The Transformation of Russian Society: Aspects of Social Change since 1861, C. E. Black, Ed. (Cambridge: Harvard UP, 1960), Kline examined the entire range of Russian ethical/social thought from 1861, pursuing the question of the degree to which the freedom, worth and dignity of the human individual figured as crucial values in that tradition, and found that the weight of nineteenth-century Russian thought was clearly on the side of ethical individualism. Prior to the revolution, only "the collectivist tendencies of Leo Tolstoy, Vladimir Soloviev, and such Marxists as Bogdanov and Bazarov" seem to stand out as exceptions.

== Nietzschean Marxism ==
Kline was one of the first Western scholars to direct special attention to the episode of "Nietzschean Marxism" found especially in the works of Volsky and Lunacharsky, as well as Bogdanov and Bazarov during the period 1903–12. Three of his studies are especially relevant: "'Nietzschean Marxism' in Russia" (in Demythologizing Marxism, Frederick J. Adelmann, S.J., Ed. (Boston and The Hague: Nijhoff, 1969), and "The Nietzschean Marxism of Stanislav Volsky" in Western Philosophical Systems in Russian Literature, ed. Anthony Mlikotin (Los Angeles: University of Southern California Press, 1979). Kline's attention to "Nietzschean Marxism" has inspired work by a number of other researchers on this same theme: see Kline's "Foreword" in Nietzsche in Russia, ed. Bernice G. Rosenthal (Princeton: Princeton UP, 1986). Ethics and morality in the Soviet period have also been a continuing interest: "Current Soviet Morality" in Encyclopedia of Morals, ed. Vergilius Ferm (New York: Philosophical Library, 1956), "Economic Crime and Punishment," Survey, no. 57 (1965), "Soviet Ethical Theory," in Encyclopedia of Ethics, ed. Lawrence C. Becker (New York: Garland; London: St. James Press, 1992), and "The Soviet Recourse to the Death Penalty for Crimes Against Socialist Property (1961-1986)," Sofia Philosophical Review, vol. 3, 2009.

== Phenomenology in Marxist materialism ==
Kline's publications on individual Russian philosophers include fifteen entries in the first edition of The Encyclopedia of Philosophy, ed. Paul Edwards (1967), ten entries in the second edition, ed. Donald M. Borchert (2005), two entries in the Routledge Encyclopedia of Philosophy, ed. Edward Craig (1998), plus individual entries in several others. Kline has published several studies on Gustav Shpet: "Meditations of a Russian Neo-Husserlian: Gustav Shpet's 'The Skeptic and his Soul'" in Phenomenology and Skepticism: Essays in Honor of James M. Edie, ed. Brice R. Wachterhauser (Evanston, Ill.: Northwestern UP, 1996); "Gustav Shpet as Interpreter of Hegel," in Archiwum Historii Filozofii i myśli społecznej, T. 44, 1999; "Shpet as Translator of Hegel's Phänomenologie des Geistes," in Gustav Shpet's Contribution to Philosophy and Cultural Theory, ed. Galin Tikhanov (W. Lafayette, Ind.: Purdue University Press, 2009). See also "The Hegelian Roots of S. L. Frank's Ethics and Social Philosophy," The Owl of Minerva, Vol. 25 (1994). (IV) Kline has published studies of Marx, the Marxist tradition and Soviet Marxism–Leninism throughout his career. One of his most important articles on Marx is "The Myth of Marx's Materialism" in Philosophical Sovietology: The Pursuit of a Science, ed. Helmut Dahm, Thomas J. Blakeley and George L. Kline (Dordrecht and Boston: Reidel, 1988).

There he denies that Marx ever promoted a materialist ontology in the normal philosophical sense, whereas most of his followers from Engels through Plekhanov and Lenin, plus all the Marxist-Leninists, have claimed that he did so. He identifies seven distinct senses of the adjective "materiell" as used by Marx, no one of which actually justifies the claim that Marx was committed to a materialist ontology. "Leszek Kolakowski and the Revision of Marxism" plus a "Bibliography of the Principal Writings of Leszek Kolakowski," published in European Philosophy Today, ed. George L. Kline (Chicago: Quadrangle Books, 1965) played a significant role in introducing the work of Kolakowski to American intellectuals. See also "Beyond Revisionism: Leszek Kolakowski's Recent Philosophical Development" and "Selective [Kolakowski] Bibliography," Triquarterly 22: A Kolakowski Reader (1971). In a similar vein, see "Georg Lukács in Retrospect: Impressions of the Man and his Ideas," Problems of Communism, vol. 21, No. 6 (1972), "Lukács's Use and Abuse of Hegel and Marx," in Lukács and His World: A Reassessment, ed. Ernest Joos (Frankfurt and New York: Peter Lang, 1987), and "Class Consciousness and the World-Historical Future" in Georg Lukács: Theory, Culture and Politics, ed. Judith Marcus and Zoltan Tarr (New Brunswick, NJ: Transaction Publishers, 1989).

== Work on Spinoza ==
In 1952 Kline published Spinoza in Soviet Philosophy (London: Routledge & Kegan Paul; New York: Humanities Press), a study of the revival of Spinoza scholarship in the Soviet Union during the 1920s and '30s, including the emergence of conflicting Marxist schools of Spinoza interpretation. This work included translations by Kline of seven major articles on Spinoza published from 1923 to 1932, with a lengthy introduction. Other studies of Soviet Marxism–Leninism by Kline include "The Poverty of Marxism-Leninism," Problems of Communism, Vol. 19, No. 6 (1970) and "La Philosophie en Union Soviétique autour de 1930" in Histoire de la littérature russe, ed. Efim Etkind et al. (Paris: Payard, 1990). (V)

== Set of principles in political philosophy ==
Throughout his career, in an important series of essays stretching from 1953 to 2000, Kline has argued for the necessity of a genuine ethical individualism, an individualism of principles (and not of mere ideals, such as might be attributed to Marx or Nietzsche or Lenin). A genuine ethical individualism recognizes the intrinsic value of existing human beings, the primacy of their claims to self-realization and the enjoyment of value in the present, and rejects as illegitimate any attempt to treat them merely instrumentally, to sacrifice their lives in the name of some as-yet-unrealized future value or future state of society.

The background for Kline's argument of ethical individualism is contained in "Humanities and Cosmologies: The Background of Certain Humane Values," Western Humanities Review, Vol. 7 (1953); "Was Marx an Ethical Humanist?" in Studies in Soviet Thought, Vol. 9 (1969); and "The Use and Abuse of Hegel by Nietzsche and Marx" [Presidential Address to the Hegel Society of America] in Hegel and His Critics, ed. William Desmond (Albany, NY: SUNY Press, 1989). In "'Present', 'Past', and 'Future' as Categoreal Terms, and the 'Fallacy of the Actual Future'," Review of Metaphysics, Vol. 40 (1986), Kline argued that past, present, and future are genuine categorical terms pace attempts by some physical theorists to claim that time is not a fundamental property of the real, that past and future are ontologically asymmetrical, that time-reversal is not possible (see irreversibility and Ilya Prigogine), and consequently that the present is ontologically prior.

It follows that any attempt to justify treating presently-living individuals as mere instruments for the realization of some alleged future good must involve the fallacy of the "actual future," i.e., the attempt to claim that the actuality of some (supposedly valuable) future state is sufficient to justify the actual sacrifice now of presently-living individuals. But such a claim is always necessarily false: the future is a realm of possibilities, and never of actualities.

More recently (in "Gustav Shpet as Interpreter of Hegel" [see above]), Kline pointed out that a strikingly similar argument was made by Shpet in his Filosofskoe mirovozrenie Gertsena (1921). Commenting on Herzen, Shpet agreed that those committed to a revolutionary quest for a future ideal "become cruel dreamers, strangers to the large and small joys of the present day, prepared...to sacrifice their own lives and the lives of others." Herzen, like Hegel, had a sense of the historical present as an end-in-itself (Selbstzweck). Shpet concluded that "for Herzen the individual person is not a 'future' ghostly person, but a person of the present day, alive and in the flesh, a real person, not a future one." Kline is also widely known as one of the most important early champions of Joseph Brodsky, translations of whose poetry Kline began to publish as early as 1965, several years before Brodsky was expelled from the Soviet Union. Kline is an exceptionally highly regarded translator of Russian poetry, including poems by Pasternak, Tsvetayeva and Voznesensky.

== Works on Whitehead ==
Kline's work on Whitehead covers Whitehead's metaphysics and the influence Whitehead's ideas have had on other non-English-speaking cultures.

== Translator for Brodsky's poetry ==
However, it is Kline's long association with Brodsky, and his very numerous translations of Brodsky's poetry, for which he is particularly known. Kline first met Brodsky in Leningrad in August, 1967, and formed a close association as translator and friend. Between 1965 and 1989 Kline published translations of poems by Brodsky on more than thirty separate occasions in a variety of publishing venues, and played a leading role in the publication of both Ostanovka v pustyne (New York: izd. Chekhova, 1970) and Joseph Brodsky: Selected Poems, Trans. George L. Kline (New York: Harper & Row, 1973). Ostanovka v pustyne was the first Russian-language edition of his poetry for which Brodsky was able to make the main editorial choices, thanks to Kline's connection with him, but Kline's name did not appear on the original edition, in order to protect Brodsky, who was still in Leningrad. Selected Poems was the first volume of translations to appear after Brodsky came to the U.S. (and the first one for which Brodsky was able to participate directly in the editing process). Kline translated all the poems for this volume and wrote the "Introduction" for it. Brodsky gradually began taking a more active role in assisting with translations of his poetry by others; as early as 1980, he began publishing some of his own translations into English. In recognition of the long personal and professional bond between them, Brodsky invited Kline to attend the ceremony in Stockholm in 1987 when he was awarded the Nobel Prize for Literature. In addition to his personal association with Brodsky, Kline has also had personal connections with Lukacs, Kolakowski, Marcuse and Losev. Both Brodsky and Kolakowski attended and made presentations for Kline's retirement ceremony at Bryn Mawr in 1991.

In 1999 Kline received the award of the American Association for the Advancement of Slavic Studies for "Distinguished Contributions to Slavic Studies." In addition to citing his remarkable scholarly career as a philosopher, translator, editor and teacher, the citation went on "to call particular attention to his extraordinary impact on his fellow scholars, many of whom have been his students. They recall his erudite, generous, and detailed comments on their papers and books, and the depth and wisdom he brought to his scholarship. Countless younger scholars consider themselves indebted to him for his judgment, encouragement, and guidance. We all stand in his debt, therefore, for helping us to appreciate the richness and depth of Russian philosophy and literature and for his long dedication to nurturing our field."

== See also ==
- Mikhail Epstein
- James H. Billington
- List of Russian philosophers
