= John W. Burbidge =

Canadian philosopher (1936–2023)

- Born: February 29, 1936; Hoiryung, Korea
- Died: November 2, 2023 (aged 87); Peterborough, Ontario

Academic background
- Education: University of Toronto (PhD)
- Thesis: Contingent Truths of Historical Fact and Eternal Truths of Reason: The Challenge of Lessing's Ditch and the Responses of Hegel and Schelling (1970)
- Doctoral advisor: Emil Fackenheim

Academic work
- Era: Contemporary philosophy
- Region: Western philosophy
- School or tradition: German Idealism
- Institutions: University of McGill
- Website: https://www.trentu.ca/philosophy/faculty-research/john-burbidge

John William Burbidge (February 29, 1936 - November 2, 2023) was a Canadian professor of philosophy. He was named to the Royal Society of Canada in 1998.

== Life and works ==
John was born in Hoiryung, Korea, to missionary parents. He grew up in Scotland and Hamilton in Ontario, Canada. He initially studied philosophy at the University of Toronto, and took his M.A. at Yale University. After returning to Canada, he married Barbara Perkins, whom he met during his graduate years. He taught for about a year at Victoria College, and then continued his studies in theology in Canada and theology at Heidelberg University in Germany. He served as a United Church minister until 1968, then returned to the University of Toronto to pursue a Ph.D. under Emil Fackenheim, with the dissertation Contingent truths of historical fact and eternal truths of reason: the challenge of Lessing's Ditch and the responses of Hegel and Schelling, which he completed in 1970, while also writing for and editing journals at Ryerson Press.

In 1970, he joined Trent University's faculty, where he taught until retiring in 1999. During his tenure, he served a term as Master of Champlain College at Trent University and conducted research abroad in France, England, Germany, and Italy. Burbidge also headed Trent's philosophy department from 1985-1990 and again in 1991. He published several respected works on Hegel and held leadership roles as president of the Hegel Society of America and honorary president of the Hegel Society of Great Britain. After retiring, he continued publishing on broader philosophical subjects. In 1998, he was inducted into the Royal Society of Canada. Professor Burbidge passed away in 2023.

=== Selected publications ===
- Historical Dictionary of Hegelian Philosophy. Scarecrow Press. 22 August 2008. ISBN 978-0-8108-6264-7.
- The Logic of Hegel's 'Logic': An Introduction. Broadview Press. 28 March 2006. ISBN 978-1-77048-173-2.
- Hegel on Logic and Religion: The Reasonableness of Christianity. SUNY Press. January 1992. ISBN 978-0-7914-1017-2.
- Real Process: How Logic and Chemistry Combine in Hegel's Philosophy of Nature. University of Toronto Press. 1996. ISBN 978-0-8020-0897-8.
- On Hegel's Logic: Fragments of a Commentary. Humanities Press. 1995. ISBN 978-0-391-03902-5.
- Fackenheim, Emil L. (1996). The God within. University of Toronto Press. ISBN 978-0-8020-0697-4. JSTOR 10.3138/j.ctt2ttmz7.
- Burbidge, John W. (2014). Cause for Thought. McGill-Queen's University Press. ISBN 978-0-7735-4353-9. JSTOR j.ctt6wpxg0.
- Burbidge, John W. (2013). Ideas, Concepts, and Reality. McGill-Queen's University Press. ISBN 978-0-7735-4127-6. JSTOR j.ctt24hnjk.
- Burbidge, John W. (2007). Hegel's Systematic Contingency. doi:10.1057/9780230590366. ISBN 978-1-349-35821-2.
- Being and Will: An Essay in Philosophical Theology. Paulist Press. 1977. ISBN 978-0-8091-0221-1.

==== Translations ====
- Hegel in His Time. Broadview Press. 31 May 1995. ISBN 978-0-921149-13-2.
- Hegel, G. W. F.; Harris, H. S. (1986). Jena System, 1804-5. McGill-Queen's University Press. ISBN 978-0-7735-1011-1. JSTOR j.ctt130hjg3.
