= Michael Zuckert =

American political philosopher

Michael P. Zuckert
- Born: July 24, 1942 (age 84)
- Spouse: Catherine Zuckert
- Children: 3, including Rachel Zuckert

Education
- Education: Cornell University (BA); University of Chicago (MA, PhD)
- Academic advisor: Leo Strauss

Philosophical work
- Era: Contemporary philosophy
- Region: Western philosophy
- Institutions: University of Notre Dame
- Main interests: Constitutional studies, political philosophy

Michael P. Zuckert (born July 24, 1942) is an American political philosopher and Reeves Dreux Professor of Political Science at the University of Notre Dame. Zuckert earned a bachelor's degree in Cornell University in 1964, and completed his master's degree and doctorate at the University of Chicago in 1967 and 1974, respectively. He is married to fellow political philosopher Catherine Zuckert.

== Books ==
- Launching Liberalism: John Locke and the Liberal Tradition (University of Kansas Press, 2002)
- The Natural Rights Republic (University of Notre Dame Press)
- Natural Rights and the New Republicanism (Princeton University Press, 1994)
- The Truth about Leo Strauss (2006) with Catherine Zuckert, University of Chicago Press
- Leo Strauss and the Problem of Political Philosophy (2014) with Catherine Zuckert, University of Chicago Press
- The Spirit of Religion and the Spirit of Liberty (University of Chicago Press, 2017)
- Lincoln and Democratic Statesmanship (University Press of Kansas, 2020)
- A Nation So Conceived: Abraham Lincoln and the Paradox of Democratic Sovereignty (University Press of Kansas, 2022)
- John Adams, Thomas Jefferson, and the Founding of America (University Press of Kansas, 2026)

== Personal life ==
Zuckert and his wife have three children together, including Kant philosopher Rachel Zuckert.
