= Catherine Zuckert =

American political philosopher (born 1942)

- Born: 1942 (age 83–84); Florida, U.S.
- Spouse: Michael Zuckert (m. 1965)
- Children: 3, including Rachel Zuckert

Academic background
- Education: Cornell University (BA, 1964); University of Chicago (MA; PhD, 1970)
- Thesis: The morality of history: a study of Friedrich Nietzsche's untimely meditations (1970)
- Academic advisor: Leo Strauss

Academic work
- Era: Contemporary philosophy
- Region: Western philosophy
- School or tradition: Straussianism
- Institutions: Carleton College; Claremont McKenna College; University of Notre Dame
- Doctoral students: Jeffrey Church (theorist)
- Main interests: Political philosophy

Catherine Herdis Heldt Zuckert (born 1942) is an American political philosopher and Reeves Dreux Professor of Political Science at the University of Notre Dame.

== Early life and education ==
Zuckert was born in 1942 to parents Agneta Dahm Christensen and Henning Heldt. Her father worked for the Miami Herald before he died in 1950, while her mother worked as a high school registrar. While attending Miami Senior High School, Zuckert was named Florida's Betty Crocker Homemaker of Tomorrow after receiving the highest grade in a written examination on homemaking knowledge and attitudes in Florida. As a result of the award, she received a $1,500 scholarship and met then-Vice President Richard Nixon at a reception held in her honor. At her high school graduation, she was recognized as an "outstanding high school senior."

Zuckert completed her Bachelor of Arts degree at Cornell University, where her future husband Michael Zuckert also attended. While enrolled at Cornell in 1964, Zuckert received a Woodrow Wilson Fellowship. Upon graduating, Zuckert and her husband enrolled at the University of Chicago for their PhDs in political science. They both studied under political philosopher Leo Strauss while at the University of Chicago.

== Career ==
In 1976, the Zuckerts joined the political science department at Claremont McKenna College as visiting associate professors.

The Zuckerts chose to accept professor positions at the University of Notre Dame in 1998, as the school was one of the few interested in hiring senior women faculty. After retiring from Notre Dame, they chose to became visiting scholars at Arizona State University's School for Civic and Economic Thought and Leadership.

== Personal life ==
Zuckert is of Danish descent. She married her husband, Michael, on September 11, 1965.

== Books ==
- Postmodern Platos (University of Chicago Press, 1996)
- Natural Right and the American Imagination: Political Philosophy in Novel Form
- Plato's Philosophers: The Coherence of the Dialogues (University of Chicago Press, 2009)
- Machiavelli's Politics (University of Chicago Press, 2017)
- The Truth about Leo Strauss (2006) with Michael P. Zuckert, University of Chicago Press
- Leo Strauss and the Problem of Political Philosophy (2014) with Michael P. Zuckert, University of Chicago Press

=== Edited ===
- Understanding the Political Spirit: From Socrates to Nietzsche
- Political Philosophy in the 20th Century: Authors and Arguments (Cambridge University Press, 2011)
- Leo Strauss on Political Philosophy (University of Chicago Press, 2018)
