= David G. Carlson =

American scholar of law and philosophy (born 1952)

- Born: 1952 (age 73–74)
- Spouse: Jeanne Lorraine Schroeder
- Awards: ABI Law Review Writing Prize (2011)

Academic background
- Education: University of California, Santa Barbara (B.A.); University of California College of the Law, San Francisco (J.D.)

Academic work
- Discipline: Bankruptcy law
- Institutions: Benjamin N. Cardozo School of Law; Cravath, Swaine & Moore (1977-1981)
- Main interests: Philosophy of law, Hegelian philosophy, Deconstruction, Psychoanalysis
- Website: https://cardozo.yu.edu/directory/david-g-carlson

David Gray Carlson (born 1952) is an American scholar of law and of Hegelian philosophy. He is a professor of law at Benjamin N. Cardozo School of Law of Yeshiva University in New York City, where he teaches in the areas of admiralty, bankruptcy, commercial law, and property.

== Life and works ==
Carlson was born in 1952 to Mr. and Mrs. Herbert Carlson of Irvine, California. He received his B.A. from the University of California, Santa Barbara in 1974 and his Juris Doctor in 1977 from University of California College of the Law, San Francisco. He married to Jeanne Lorraine Schroeder in 1980. Carlson and Schroeder were associates with the New York law firm of Cravath, Swaine & Moore, where he served from 1977 to 1981 before joining Cardozo.

He has been the winner of American Bankruptcy Institute's "ABI Law Review Writing Prize" for the article "The Role of Valuation in Federal Bankruptcy Exemption Process" in 2011.

== Selected publications ==
=== Monographs ===
- Carlson, David Gray (2007). A Commentary to Hegel's Science of Logic. doi:10.1057/9780230598904. ISBN 978-1-349-54073-0.

=== Edited volumes ===
- Cornell, Drucilla; Rosenfeld, Michel; Carlson, David Gray, eds. (2016). Deconstruction and the Possibility of Justice. Routledge. doi:10.4324/9781315539744. ISBN 978-1-134-93515-4.
- Cornell, Drucilla; Rosenfeld, Michel; Carlson, David Gray, eds. (2014-02-25). Hegel and Legal Theory. Routledge. doi:10.4324/9781315831923. ISBN 978-1-315-83192-3.
- Law and the postmodern mind : essays on psychoanalysis and jurisprudence. Ann Arbor: University of Michigan Press. 1998. ISBN 978-0-472-10841-1.
- Carlson, David Gray, ed. (2005). Hegel's Theory of the Subject. doi:10.1057/9780230522626. ISBN 978-1-349-54671-8.

=== Articles ===
- Carlson, David Gray (2010). "The Role of Valuation in Federal Bankruptcy Exemption Process: The Supreme Court Reads Schedule C". American Bankruptcy Institute Law Review. 18 (2): 461–494.
- Carlson, David Gray (2002). "Hegel's Theory of Quantity". Cardozo Law Review. 23 (6) 6.
- Carlson, David Gray (1992). "The Hegelian Revival in American Legal Discourse". University of Miami Law Review. 46 (4): 1051.
