= Andrew Buchwalter =

American philosophy professor

Academic background
- Education: Boston University (PhD)
- Thesis: Philosophy and politics in the thought of G.W.F. Hegel (1989)
- Doctoral advisor: Thomas A. McCarthy

Academic work
- Era: Contemporary philosophy
- Region: Western philosophy
- School or tradition: German Idealism
- Institutions: University of North Florida

Andrew James Buchwalter is a presidential professor emeritus of philosophy at the Department of Philosophy and Religious Studies in University of North Florida.

== Life and works ==
Buchwalter received his Ph.D. from Boston University in philosophy in May 1988, with the dissertation "Philosophy and politics in the thought of G.W.F. Hegel".

=== Selected publications ===
- Buchwalter, Andrew, ed. (2012). "Hegel and Global Justice". Studies in Global Justice. 10. doi:10.1007/978-90-481-8996-0. ISBN 978-90-481-8995-3. ISSN 1871-0409.
- Buchwalter, Andrew (2012-11-12). Dialectics, Politics, and the Contemporary Value of Hegel's Practical Philosophy. Routledge. doi:10.4324/9780203802113. ISBN 978-1-136-62456-8.
- Habermas, Jürgen (1984). Observations on "the Spiritual Situation of the Age": Contemporary German Perspectives. MIT Press. ISBN 978-0-262-58074-8.
