= Glenn Alexander Magee =

American philosopher

- Born: 1966 (age 59–60)

Education
- Education: George Mason University (BA); Emory University (MA, PhD)
- Thesis: Hegel and the Hermetic Tradition (1998)
- Doctoral advisor: Donald Phillip Verene

Philosophical work
- Era: Contemporary philosophy
- Region: Western philosophy
- Institutions: Long Island University
- Main interests: German philosophy, mysticism, Western esotericism
- Notable ideas: Hermetic interpretation of Hegel

Glenn Alexander Magee (born 1966) is an American philosopher. He is a professor and chairman of the Department of Philosophy at Long Island University.

== Life and works ==
Magee received his BA from George Mason University and subsequently his MA and PhD both from Emory University. He defended his PhD dissertation entitled Hegel and the Hermetic Tradition under the direction of Donald Phillip Verene in 1998.

== Selected publications ==
=== Monographs ===
- Hegel And The Hermetic Tradition. Cornell University Press. 2001.
- The Hegel Dictionary. A&C Black. 2010. ISBN 978-1-84706-590-2.

=== Editorials ===
- Magee, Glenn Alexander, ed. (2018). Hegel and Ancient Philosophy: A Re-Examination. Routledge. doi:10.4324/9781315105864. ISBN 978-1-315-10586-4.
- Magee, Glenn Alexander (2016). The Cambridge Handbook of Western Mysticism and Esotericism. Cambridge University Press. ISBN 978-1-316-67935-7.
