= Louis Dupré (philosopher) =

Belgian-American philosopher (1925–2022)

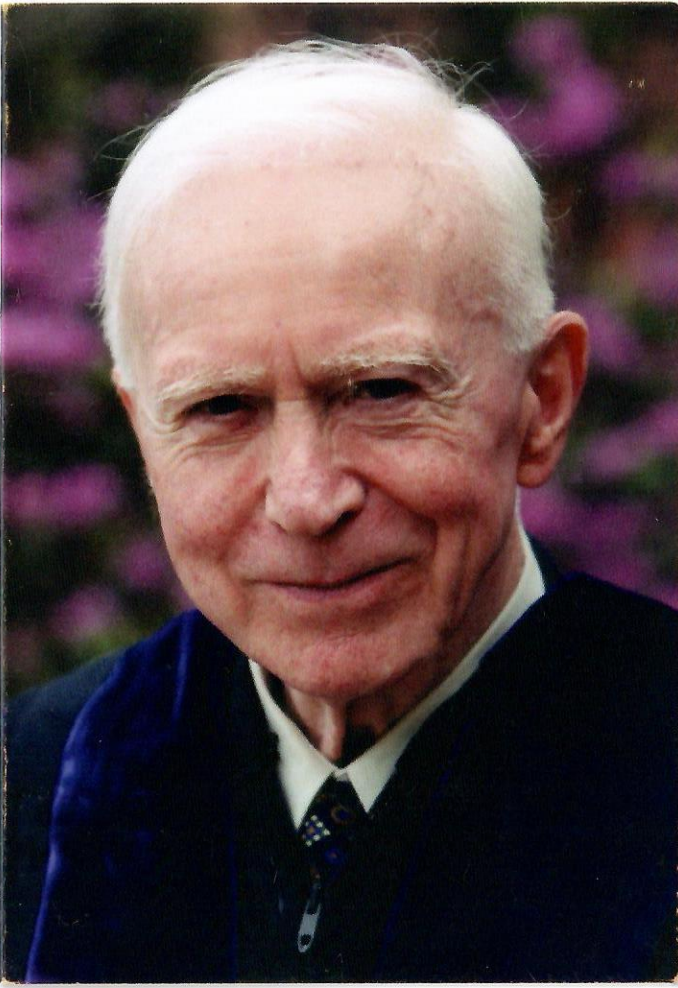

Louis Dupré (French pronunciation: [lwi dypʁe]; April 16, 1925 – January 11, 2022) was a Belgian-born American religious philosopher, Catholic phenomenologist, and professor emeritus at Yale University. During his lifetime, he authored 15 books, edited four volumes, and wrote more than 400 articles. His most famous works included a highly acclaimed trilogy on the "spiritual sources of modern culture", in which he argued that "the nominalist theology of the late Middle Ages drove a wedge between creator and creation".

== Early life and education ==
Dupré was born in Veerle/Laakdal, Belgium, studied at the University of Louvain (KULeuven) where he graduated in 1956. His doctoral dissertation on The Starting Point of Marxist Philosophy received the University’s biennial J.M. Huyghe prize in social studies. Receiving a study grant from the Danish Government he went to Copenhagen to do research on Kierkegaard.

== Career ==
In 1958 he emigrated to the USA and taught modern philosophy at Georgetown University until 1973 when he was appointed T. Lawrason Riggs professor in the philosophy of religion at Yale University.

In 1968 he became a fellow of the American Council of Learned Societies. In 1971 he was elected President of the American Catholic Philosophical Association and in 1972 he became President of the Hegel Society of America. In 1978 he served as a member of an international committee formed for the inspection of Italian universities organized by the International Council on the Future of the University. He received the Prijs De Standaard in 1982 for Terugkeer naar innerlijkheid, the best essay in the Dutch language in Belgium, a reworked translation of his earlier Transcendent Selfhood (1976). After becoming an American citizen he was in 1989 chosen a foreign member of the Koninklijke Vlaamse Academie van België voor Wetenschappen en Kunsten. In 1994 he became a member of the American Academy of Arts and Sciences.

For years Dupré worked on his magisterial trilogy on the origins and development of modernity. Passage to Modernity: an essay on the Hermeneutics of Nature and Culture (1993) was the first and best known part. It was followed by The Enlightenment and the Intellectual Foundations of Modern Culture (2004). The final part appeared as The Quest of the Absolute: Birth and Decline of European Romanticism (2013). Dupré also published several studies on the meaning and the place of religion in modern culture and highlighted the importance of religious symbols, religious interiority and mysticism.

He was a guest professor at the University of Louvain (KULeuven), St. Louis University, University of California at Sancta Barbara, University College (Dublin), Istituto degli Studi Filosofici (Naples), Brigham Young University (Utah), and lectured at a number of colleges and universities in the USA and Europe.

== Personal life and death ==
Dupré retired in 1998, left the United States in 2010, and took residence with his wife Edith in Kortrijk, a small town in Flanders, the Northern, Dutch speaking part of Belgium.

He died at his home on January 11, 2022, aged 96.

== Bibliography ==
- Kierkegaard as Theologian: The Dialectic of Christian Existence, New York, Sheed and Ward, 1963
- Contraception and Catholics, Baltimore, Helicon Press, 1964 (translated into Spanish)
- The Philosophical Foundations of Marxism, New York, Harcourt Brace, 1966 (translated into Dutch and Korean)
- The Other Dimension, New York, Doubleday, 1972 (translated into French, Chinese and Polish, abridged translation into Dutch)
- Symbols of the Sacred, Grand Rapids MI, Eerdmans, 2000 (amplified version of the core of some chapters of The Other Dimension – translated into German, Korean and Spanish)
- Transcendent Selfhood, New York, The Seabury Press, 1976 (translated and revised into Dutch by Edith Cardoen as Terugkeer naar Innerlijkheid)
- A Dubious Heritage: Studies in the Philosophy of Religion after Kant, New York, Newman Books, 1979
- Marx’s Social Critique of Culture, New Haven CT, Yale University Press,1983
- The Deeper Life, New York, Crossroad, 1984 (translated into Dutch, Polish and German)
- The Common Life: The Origins of Trinitarian Mysticism and its Development by Jan Ruusbroec, New York, Crossroad, 1984 (Translated into Polish)
- Passage to Modernity, An essay on the Hermeneutics of Nature and Culture, New Haven CT, Yale University Press, 1993
- Metaphysics and Culture. The Aquinas Lecture 1994, Milwaukee WI, Marquette University Press, 1994
- Religious Mystery and Rational Reflection. Excursions in the Phenomenology and Philosophy of Religion, Grand Rapids MI, Eerdmans (1998)
- The Enlightenment and the Intellectual Foundations of Modern Culture, New Haven CT, Yale University Press, 2004
- Religion and the Rise of Modern Culture. The Erasmus Lectures, Notre Dame University Press, 2008
- The Quest of the Absolute: Birth and Decline of European Romanticism, Notre Dame University Press, 2013

=== Edited and introduced ===
- Faith and Reflection- Readings in the Philosophy of Religion of Henry Duméry, selected and introduced by Louis Dupré, New York, N.Y. Herder and Herder, 1968
- Light from Light: An Anthology of Christian Mysticism, edited by Louis Dupré and James Wiseman, New York, Paulist Press, 1988
- Christian Spirituality III: Post-Reformation and Modern, edited by Louis Dupré and Don E. Saliers. World Spirituality Vol. 18, New York, Crossroads, 1989

== Prizes and awards ==
- J.M. Huygheprijs (1956) for his doctoral dissertation
- Prijs De Standaard (1982) for Terugkeer naar Innnerlijkheid, a by Edith Cardoen reworked translation of Transcendent Selfhood (1976)
- DeVane Medal for excellence in scholarship and teaching, awarded by the Yale Phi Beta Kappa Society (1996)

== Honorary doctorates ==
- Loyola College (Baltimore), Sacred Hearth College (Fairfield, CT), Georgetown University (Washington DC), Siena College (Albany, N.Y.), Saint Michael’s College (Vermont), Regis College (Toronto), Marquette University (Milwaukee, Wisconsin).

== Liber Amicorum ==
- Peter J. Casarella & George P. Schner (eds.), Christian Spirituality and the Culture of Modernity. The Thought of Louis Dupré, William B. Eerdmans Publishing Company, Grand Rapids MI/Cambridge, U.K., 1998

== External links – Conversations with Louis Dupré ==
- William Stranger : www.youtube.com/watch?v=aA-JpqC_bUM
- Lucette Verboven : www.youtube.com/watch?v=wdPJ1RdEGVg and www.youtube.com/watch?v=MTTuZiOlCBY (Dutch)
