= Mark Alznauer =

American professor of philosophy

Academic background
- Education: University of Chicago (PhD)
- Thesis: Hegel's Defense of Moral Responsibility (2008)
- Doctoral advisor: Robert B. Pippin

Academic work
- Era: Contemporary philosophy
- Region: Western philosophy
- School or tradition: German Idealism
- Institutions: Northwestern University
- Website: https://sites.northwestern.edu/alznauer/

Mark Alznauer is a professor of philosophy at Northwestern University. Alznauer is the current president of Hegel Society of America from 2024 to 2026.

== Life and work ==
=== Selected publications ===
==== Monographs ====
- Alznauer, Mark (2015). Hegel's Theory of Responsibility. Cambridge: Cambridge University Press. doi:10.1017/cbo9781139939614. ISBN 978-1-107-07812-3.

==== Editorials ====
- Alznauer, Mark, ed. (2021-05-01). Hegel on Tragedy and Comedy: New Essays. State University of New York Press. doi:10.2307/jj.18252813. ISBN 978-1-4384-8338-2.
- Alznauer, Mark; Torralba, José M. (2016). Theories of Action and Morality: Perspectives from Philosophy and Social Theory. Georg Olms Verlag AG. ISBN 978-3-487-42168-1.

==== Articles ====
- "Untrue Concepts in Hegel's Logic". Journal of the History of Philosophy. 61 (1): 103–126. 2023. ISSN 1538-4586.
