= David S. Stern =

Professor of philosophy (born 1956)

- Born: 1956 (age 69–70)

Academic background
- Education: University of California, San Diego (PhD)
- Thesis: Substance and Subject: On Hegel's Conception of Subjectivity (1985)

Academic work
- Era: Contemporary philosophy
- Region: Western philosophy
- School or tradition: German Idealism
- Institutions: University of Tampa

David Samuel Stern (born 1956 Oakland, California) is a professor of philosophy at the University of Tampa.

== Life and works ==
Stern joined University of Tampa in 2013, before that he was a professor at Hamline University. He earned his Ph.D. in philosophy from the University of California, San Diego in 1985, with the dissertation "Substance and Subject: On Hegel's Conception of Subjectivity". He held faculty positions at several institutions, including Louisiana State University, UC San Diego, the University of Toledo and the University of Texas. He received his B.A. in political science with honors from Louisiana State University, where he was also elected to Phi Beta Kappa. From 1999 to 2005, Stern served as dean of the College of Arts and Sciences at the University of Toledo.

== Selected publications ==
=== Editorials ===
- Essays on Hegel's Philosophy of Subjective Spirit. SUNY Press. 2012-12-27. doi:10.1515/9781438444468. ISBN 978-1-4384-4446-8.

=== Articles ===
- "The Immanence of Thought: Hegel's Critique of Foundationalism". Owl of Minerva. 22 (1): 19–33. 1990. doi:10.5840/owl199022118. ISSN 0030-7580.
- "Foundationalism, Holism, or Hegel?". Journal of the British Society for Phenomenology. 22 (1): 21–32. 1991-01-01. doi:10.1080/00071773.1991.11006928. ISSN 0007-1773.
- "Unending modernity". Inquiry. 38 (3): 277–288. 1995-09-01. doi:10.1080/00201749508602390. ISSN 0020-174X.
- "Kant and Hegel on the Logic of Being-for-Self:", Proceedings of the Eighth International Kant Congress, Marquette University Press, 1995, pp. 973–976, doi:10.5840/kant199519951part3115, ISBN 978-1-63435-010-5
