= Kenley R. Dove =

American philosophy professor (1936–2022)

- Born: Kenley Royce Dove; August 31, 1936; Appleton, Minnesota, U.S.
- Died: November 19, 2022 (aged 86)

Education
- Education: Yale University (MA, PhD)
- Thesis: Toward an Interpretation of Hegel's Phanomenologie des Geistes (1965)
- Doctoral advisor: George A. Schrader
- Other advisors: Quentin Lauer; Herbert Marcuse

Philosophical work
- Era: Contemporary philosophy
- Region: Western philosophy
- School: German idealism
- Institutions: Yale University; State University of New York at Purchase
- Notable students: Daniel Breazeale
- Main interests: Metaphysics
- Website: https://www.kenleydove.com/

Kenley Royce Dove (August 31, 1936 – November 19, 2022) was an American professor of philosophy at State University of New York at Purchase.

== Life and work ==
Dove received his BA from St. Olaf College in 1958 and his MA from Yale University in 1960. He received his PhD from Yale in 1965 with the dissertation on Toward an Interpretation of Hegel's Phanomenologie Des Geistes, for which he received comments and suggestions from Herbert Marcuse and Quentin Lauer.

Along with Richard Dien Winfield, William Maker and Stephen Houlgate, Dove is said to defend a 'presuppositionless' and 'non-foundational' reading of Hegel's Logic. The most important part of Dove's later work is his interpretation of Hegel as "the Aristotle of the modern word."

"The PhG [Phenomenology of Spirit] is a radical reintroduction to Aristotelian thought in the modern world, that is, an introduction to Hegelianism."

Regarding this 'non-foundational' reading of Hegel Dove said the following:

"Some of my students at Yale and the New School in the 1960s and 1970s have taken my Sellars-inspired anti-foundationalist interpretation of the PhG to be the essence of Hegel per se. None of these students has yet grasped the relationship between Hegel and Aristotle." In his contribution to the Festschrift for Denis Mickiewicz (“A Word to Denis in His 80th Year”) Dove reflects on his own legacy, contemplating the “posthumous recognition” of his “high-minded project” that “just may come,” if and when his “controversial take” on the connection between Aristotle and Hegel becomes “conventional wisdom.”

"I have come to regard Aristotle and Hegel as the paradigmatic expositors of ancient and modern European civilization. My take on both has been controversial. I would like to think that it will someday become conventional wisdom, but this would be long after I expire. I arrived at an interpretation of Aristotle, and his relationship with Hegel, that might be a decisive element in our understanding of Western, and ultimately, thanks to Hegel, contemporary global civilization. This project is vacuous short of the posthumous recognition of the Aristotle/Hegel connection that I would like. But it just may come."

Dove notably influenced Andreas Esheté during his undergraduate studies at Williams College. Esheté subsequently followed Dove to Yale University, where Dove supervised his doctoral dissertation in 1970 (on The Social Structure of Freedom). In later years, Dove publicly defended Esheté against online attacks in the Addis Journal.

== Selected works ==
- Dove, Kenley R. (2001). “G. W. F. Hegel: “Sense-Certainty,” from the Phenomenology of Spirit, Chapter 1 (1807).” The Philosophical Forum, vol. 32, no. 4, pp. 399–406, https://doi.org/10.1111/0031-806X.00075.
- Dove, Kenley R. (1970). "Hegel's Phenomenological Method". The Review of Metaphysics. 23 (4): 615–641. ISSN 0034-6632.
- Dove, Kenley R. (2002). "Words and Things in Aristotle and Hegel: "το ον λεγεται πολλαχωs"". The Philosophical Forum. 33 (2): 125–142. doi:10.1111/0031-806X.00001. ISSN 1467-9191.
