= Robert L. Perkins =

- Born: June 23, 1930; Jacksonville, Florida
- Died: March 20, 2018 (aged 87)

Academic background
- Education: Indiana University (PhD)
- Thesis: Kierkegaard and Hegel: The Dialectical Structure of Kierkegaard's Ethical Thought (1965)
- Doctoral advisor: Newton Phelps Stallknecht
- Other advisors: Alan Donagan, Henry Veatch

Academic work
- Era: Contemporary philosophy
- Region: Western philosophy
- Institutions: Stetson University

Robert Lee Perkins (June 23, 1930 Jacksonville, Florida - March 20, 2018) was a distinguished scholar of Søren Kierkegaard and Hegel at Stetson University.

== Life and works ==
Born in Jacksonville, Florida, after graduating from Stetson University in 1951, he was awarded a Bachelor of Divinity from the Southern Baptist Theological Seminary. He received both his M.A. (1961) and Ph.D. (1964) from Indiana University Bloomington, and also earned a diploma from the Graduate School for Foreign Students at the University of Copenhagen in 1963. Bob was the founder of the Søren Kierkegaard Society of North America and editor of the Kierkegaard Newsletter and the 24-volume International Kierkegaard Commentary. His scholarship made lasting contributions to Kierkegaard studies and the broader field of philosophy.

=== Selected publications ===
==== Editorials ====
- History and system : Hegel's philosophy of history. Internet Archive. Albany : State University of New York Press. 1984. ISBN 978-0-87395-814-1.

==== Articles ====
- "What a Hegelian fool I was". History of European Ideas. 20 (1–3): 177–181. 1995. doi:10.1016/0191-6599(95)92939-R. ISSN 0191-6599.
