= Donald Phillip Verene =

American philosopher and author (born 1937)

- Born: October 24, 1937 (age 89); Galesburg, Illinois, U.S.

Education
- Education: Knox College (AB, 1959); Washington University in St. Louis (AM, 1962; PhD, 1964)
- Thesis: An Examination of Ernst Cassirer's Philosophy of Symbolic Forms (1964)

Philosophical work
- Era: Contemporary philosophy
- Region: Western philosophy
- School: Speculative philosophy
- Institutions: Northern Illinois University; Pennsylvania State University; Emory University
- Doctoral students: Glenn Alexander Magee
- Notable students: William Desmond
- Main interests: History of philosophy, metaphysics, philosophy of culture, philosophy of literature, rhetoric
- Notable ideas: Philosophy as self-knowledge

Donald Phillip Verene (born October 24, 1937) is an American philosopher and author. He is the Charles Howard Candler Professor of Metaphysics and Moral Philosophy at Emory University.

== Early life and education ==
Donald Verene was born in Galesburg, Illinois. He studied at Knox College in his hometown, receiving his bachelor's degree in 1959. He earned his doctorate in philosophy at Washington University in St. Louis in 1964.

Verene is married to Molly Black Verene. Their son, Chris Verene is a photographer.

== Career ==
Verene is a lecturing academic at Emory University. He was editor of Philosophy and Rhetoric from 1976 to 1987. From 1982 to 1988, he was the Chair of Emory's Department of Philosophy.

Considered a worldwide authority on Giambattista Vico, he leads Emory's Center for Vico Studies and edits New Vico Studies. His wife, Molly Black Verene, serves as Assistant Director of the Center.

He also serves on the Board of Visitors for Ralston College, a start-up liberal arts college in Savannah, Georgia.

Verene was a visiting fellow at Pembroke College, Oxford in 1988. He was a visiting scholar at La Sapienza University of Rome in 1996. He is also a Fellow of the Accademia Nazionale dei Lincei.

== Publications ==
Verene is the author of Vico’s Science of Imagination (Cornell, 1992) and Philosophy and the Return to Self-Knowledge (Yale, 1997).

Other publications written by Verene include:

- Vico and Joyce (Cornell 1987)
- Hegel's Recollection: A Study of Images in the Phenomenology of Spirit (SUNY, 1985)
- The Art of Humane Education (Cornell, 2002)
- The History of Philosophy: A Reader's Guide Including a List of 100 Great Philosophical Works from the Pre-Socratics to the Mid-Twentieth Century (Northwestern, 2008)
