= Warren E. Steinkraus =

American philosopher

- Born: 1922; Boston, Massachusetts
- Died: February 19, 1990 (aged 67–68); Syracuse, New York

Academic background
- Education: Boston University (PhD)
- Thesis: The Given in Certain Epistemological Theories Since 1920 (1952)
- Doctoral advisor: Edgar S. Brightman

Academic work
- Era: Contemporary philosophy
- Region: Western philosophy
- Institutions: State University of New York at Oswego

Warren Edward Steinkraus (February 14, 1922 in Boston, Massachusetts – February 19, 1990 in Syracuse, New York), was an American philosopher and scholar in the fields of idealism, aesthetics, history of philosophy, peace studies and philosophy of religion.

== Life and works ==
He earned his A.B. from Baldwin-Wallace College in Ohio in 1943, which later awarded him an honorary L.H.D. degree in 1975. He completed his S.T.B. with magna cum laude honors at Boston University in 1946, followed by a Ph.D. from the same university in 1952, with the dissertation entitled The given in certain epistemological theories since 1920. His post-doctoral studies took him to the State University of Iowa, Harvard University, Cambridge University, and the University of Heidelberg.

Edward began his teaching career at Emerson College, Cornell College, and DePauw University. He then served as Associate Professor and Chair of Philosophy at Iowa Wesleyan College (1956–1959), Professor and Chair of Philosophy and Religion at Union College in Kentucky (1959–1964), and Professor of Philosophy at SUNY Oswego from 1964 until his retirement in 1987. In recognition of his distinguished scholarship and teaching at SUNY Oswego, the Warren Steinkraus Lectures on Human Ideals were established in his honor in 1988. The third annual lecture was held in April 1990.

=== Selected publications ===
- Art and logic in Hegel's philosophy. Humanities Press. 1980. ISBN 978-0-391-00542-6.
- Philosophy of art. 1974.
- New studies in Hegel's philosophy. 1971. ISBN 978-0-03-079315-8.
- New studies in Berkeley's philosophy. New York, Holt, Rinehart and Winston. 1966.
