= William H. Werkmeister =

Academic background
- Education: University of Nebraska (PhD)
- Thesis: Driesch's philosophy: An Exposition and a Critical Analysis (1927)

Academic work
- Era: Contemporary philosophy
- Region: Western philosophy
- Institutions: Florida State University, University of Southern California

William Henry Werkmeister (August 10, 1901 Asendorf, Germany – November 23, 1993 Tallahassee, Florida) was a German-born American philosopher. He represented a type of Neo-Kantianism inspired by the Marburg School.

== Life and works ==
After studying at the University of Münster, he emigrated to the U.S. in 1923 and earned his PhD in philosophy from the University of Nebraska in 1927, writing a dissertation on "Driesch’s Philosophy: An Exposition and a Critical Analysis". He joined the Nebraska faculty in 1926 and rose through the ranks, serving as department chair until 1953. He then taught at the University of Southern California (1954–1966) and Florida State University (until retiring in 1972), remaining active until his death.

Werkmeister was president of several philosophical societies and contributed extensively to academic journals, including editing The Personalist. His philosophical work focused on Kant, Heidegger, Husserl, and Hartmann, critiquing post-Kantian German philosophy for its overemphasis on time and neglect of space. In his later work, published posthumously in 1996, he analyzed the chronological order of Heidegger’s writings and offered a controversial defense of Heidegger’s Nazi affiliation. Overall, Werkmeister believed Kant’s philosophical challenges framed much of post-Kantian philosophy, though often inadequately addressed.

=== Selected publications ===
- Werkmeister, W.H.; Hull, Richard T. (1996). Martin Heidegger on the Way. doi:10.1163/9789004495883. ISBN 978-90-04-49588-3.

=== Literature ===
- Dancy, R. M., ed. (1993). Kant and Critique: New Essays in Honor of W.H. Werkmeister. doi:10.1007/978-94-015-8179-0. ISBN 978-90-481-4261-3.
